= Mateo Edward =

Panamanian sprinter

Personal information
- Full name: Mateo Aston Edward Henry
- Nationality: Panamanian
- Born: 1 May 1993 (age 33)

Sport
- Sport: Running
- Event: Sprints

Achievements and titles
- Personal best(s): 100 m: 10.28 (Mississippi 2017); 200 m: 21.29 (Alabama 2015)
Medal record
Men's athletics
Representing Panama
Central American Games
Silver medal – second place	2013 San José	200 m
Bronze medal – third place	2010 Panamá	100 m
Gold medal – first place	2010 Panamá	4×100 m relay
Central American Championships
Gold medal – first place	2012 Managua	100 m
Silver medal – second place	2012 Managua	4×100 m relay
Bronze medal – third place	2011 San José	100 m
Silver medal – second place	2011 San José	4×100 m relay
South American Junior Championships
Bronze medal – third place	2011 Medellín	100 m
South American Youth Championships
Gold medal – first place	2010 Santiago	100 m
Silver medal – second place	2010 Santiago	200 m
- Updated on 24 July 2014

Mateo Aston Edward Henry (born 1 May 1993) is a Panamanian sprinter. He is the younger brother of Alonso Edward.

Edward finished eighth in the 100 metres at the 2010 Summer Youth Olympics. He also competed in the 60 metres at the 2012 IAAF World Indoor Championships running a personal best 6.91.

== Personal bests ==
=== Outdoor ===
- 100 m: 10.29 s (wind: -1.4 m/s) – (United States) Hattiesburg, Mississippi, 3 May 2014
- 200 m: 21.36 s (wind: +1.5 m/s) – (El Salvador) San Salvador, 26 May 2012

=== Indoor ===
- 60 m: 6.70 s – (United States) Daytona Beach, Florida, 20 February 2016

== Achievements ==
Year	Competition	Venue	Position	Event	Notes
Representing Panama
2008	Central American Youth Championships (U18)	San Salvador, El Salvador	1st	100 m	11.09 (+0.4 m/s)
2008	Central American Youth Championships (U18)	San Salvador, El Salvador	1st	200 m	22.68 (-1.5 m/s)
2008	Central American Youth Championships (U18)	San Salvador, El Salvador	3rd	1000 m medley relay	2:03.19
2008	Central American Age Group; Championships (U16)	Managua, Nicaragua	1st	100 m	11.17 (NWI)
2008	Central American Age Group; Championships (U16)	Managua, Nicaragua	1st	150 m	16.77 (NWI)
2008	Central American Age Group; Championships (U16)	Managua, Nicaragua	4th	4 × 100 m relay	46.31
2008	South American Youth Championships	Lima, Peru	7th	100 m	11.53 (-3.9 m/s)
2008	South American Youth Championships	Lima, Peru	8th	200 m	23.08 (-0.4 m/s)
2009	World Youth Championship	Bressanone, Italy	7th (sf)	100 m	10.88 (+1.1 m/s)
2009	World Youth Championship	Bressanone, Italy	4th (h)	200 m	22.21 (+1.1 m/s)
2010	Central American Games	Panama City, Panama	3rd	100 m	10.78 (-0.2 m/s)
2010	Central American Games	Panama City, Panama	6th	200 m	22.18 (+0.1 m/s)
2010	Central American Games	Panama City, Panama	1st	4 × 100 m relay	41.69
2010	Summer Youth Olympics	Singapore, Singapore	8th	100 m	10.80 (+0.1 m/s)
2010	South American Youth Championships	Santiago, Chile	1st	100 m	10.65 w (+2.2 m/s)
2010	South American Youth Championships	Santiago, Chile	2nd	200 m	21.78
2011	Central American Junior Championships (U20)	San Salvador, El Salvador	1st	100 m	10.62 (-0.8 m/s)
2011	Central American Junior Championships (U20)	San Salvador, El Salvador	1st	200 m	21.64 (-1.5 m/s)
2011	Central American Championships	San José, Costa Rica	3rd	100 m	10.75 (-0.7 m/s)
2011	Central American Championships	San José, Costa Rica	2nd	4 × 100 m relay	41.39
2011	Pan American Junior Championships	Miramar, United States	6th (h)	100 m	10.62 w (+2.1 m/s)
2011	South American Junior Championships	Medellín, Colombia	1st	100 m	10.47 (0.0 m/s)
2011	South American Junior Championships	Medellín, Colombia	3rd (h)	200 m	22.86
2012	World Indoor Championships	Istanbul, Turkey	21st (h)	60 m	6.91
2012	Central American Junior Championships (U20)	San Salvador, El Salvador	1st	100 m	10.46 (-0.1 m/s)
2012	Central American Junior Championships (U20)	San Salvador, El Salvador	1st	200 m	21.36 (+1.5 m/s)
2012	Central American Junior Championships (U20)	San Salvador, El Salvador	1st	4 × 100 m relay	42.21
2012	Ibero-American Championships	Barquisimeto, Venezuela	4th	100 m	10.62 (-0.2 m/s)
2012	Central American Championships	Managua, Nicaragua	1st	100 m	10.46 (NWI)
2012	Central American Championships	Managua, Nicaragua	2nd	4 × 100 m relay	42.45
2012	World Junior Championships	Barcelona, Spain	45th (h)	100 m	10.86
2013	Central American Games	San José, Costa Rica	2nd	100 m	10.58 (-1.5 m/s)
2013	Central American Games	San José, Costa Rica	4th	200 m	21.37 w (+2.1 m/s)
2013	Central American Games	San José, Costa Rica	—	4 × 100 m relay	DNF
2013	Central American Championships	Managua, Nicaragua	3rd	100 m	10.77 (-1.6 m/s)
2013	Central American Championships	Managua, Nicaragua	4th	200 m	21.89 w (+2.7 m/s)
2013	Central American Championships	Managua, Nicaragua	1st	4 × 100 m relay	41.6 (ht)
2013	South American Championships	Cartagena, Colombia	11th (h)	100 m	10.92
2014	Central American Championships	Tegucigalpa, Honduras	4th	100 m	10.70 w (+2.6 m/s)
2014	Ibero-American Championships	São Paulo, Brazil	7th	100 m	10.66 (+0.6 m/s)
2015	South American Championships	Lima, Peru	5th	100 m	10.62 (-1.1 m/s)
2016	World Indoor Championships	Portland, United States	33rd (h)	60 m	6.78
2017	Bolivarian Games	Santa Marta, Colombia	4th	100 m	10.58
2018	South American Games	Cochabamba, Bolivia	14th (h)	100 m	10.62
2018	Central American and Caribbean Games	Barranquilla, Colombia	19th (h)	100 m	10.56
2019	South American Championships	Lima, Peru	10th (h)	100 m	10.70
2019	South American Championships	Lima, Peru	14th (h)	200 m	21.93
2020	South American Indoor Championships	Cochabamba, Bolivia	5th	60 m	6.86
2022	South American Indoor Championships	Cochabamba, Bolivia	8th	60 m	6.99
