= 2010 South American Youth Championships in Athletics =

XX South American Youth Championships in Athletics
- Dates: October 9–10
- Host city: Santiago, Chile
- Venue: Estadio Nacional Julio Martínez Prádanos
- Level: Youth
- Events: 40
- Participation: about 278 athletes from 13 nations

The 20th South American Youth Championships in Athletics were held in Santiago, Chile at the Estadio Nacional Julio Martínez Prádanos from October 9–10, 2010. A detailed report on the results was given.

== Medal summary ==
Medal winners are published, and complete results can be found on the Fedachi, on the Fecodatle, and on the "World Junior Athletics History" website.

=== Men salto triplo ===
Event	Gold		Silver		Bronze	
100 metres (wind: +2.2 m/s)	Mateo Edward (PAN)	10.65 w	Rodrigo Rocha (BRA)	10.77 w	Caio dos Santos (BRA)	10.80 w
200 metres	Antônio Rodrigues (BRA)	21.48	Mateo Edward (PAN)	21.78	Rodrigo Rocha (BRA)	21.90
400 metres	Leandro de Araújo (BRA)	47.87	Diego Palomeque (COL)	47.89	Edmundo Díaz (PER)	48.80
800 metres	Joseilton Cuñha (BRA)	1:50.6 CR	Maicon dos Santos (BRA)	1:51.1	Alejandro Peirano (CHI)	1:53.8
1500 metres	Carlos Díaz (CHI)	4:12.11	Vanilso Silva (BRA)	4:14.81	Michael Villanueva (PER)	4:16.87
3000 metres	Marcos Guaman (ECU)	8:52.80	Michael Alba (CHI)	8:55.54	Maicon da Silva Mancuso (BRA)	8:59.52
2000 metres steeplechase	Ioran Etchechury (BRA)	6:10.21	William Díaz (VEN)	6:12.83	Luiz Nunes (BRA)	6:14.61
110 metres hurdles (wind: -1.0 m/s)	Patricio Colarte (CHI)	14.08	Claudinei Oliveira (BRA)	14.21	Lucas Carvalho (BRA)	14.26
400 metres hurdles	Alfredo Sepúlveda (CHI)	53.6	Wesley Martins (BRA)	54.1	Mauricio Barrios (CHI)	54.6
High jump	Almir dos Santos (BRA)	2.00	Felipe Hickmann (BRA)	1.97	Eure Añez (VEN)	1.94
Pole vault	Thiago Braz da Silva (BRA)	5.10	Heberth Gómez (COL)	5.05	Giovani Gattei (BRA)	4.20
Long jump	Douglas Selestrino (BRA)	7.42 (wind: -0.9 m/s)	Jadson Silva (BRA)	7.36 (wind: +1.9 m/s)	Leandro Monje (ARG)	6.90 (wind: +0.4 m/s)
Triple jump	Henrique da Silva (BRA)	15.16 (wind: -0.3 m/s)	Paulo Sérgio Oliveira (BRA)	15.13 (wind: +0.3 m/s)	Divie Murillo (COL)	14.41 (wind: +0.4 m/s)
Shot put	Joaquín Ballivián (CHI)	20.53 CR AR-y	John Zea (COL)	17.86	Daniel Castillo (CHI)	17.26
Discus throw	Felipe Lorenzon (BRA)	58.74 CR	Alejandro Copete (ECU)	54.23	Joaquín Ballivián (CHI)	53.99
Hammer throw	Fabián Serna (COL)	71.77	Jonatan Gras (ARG)	67.11	Hevertt Álvarez (CHI)	66.47
Javelin throw	Braian Toledo (ARG)	85.32 CR	Edgar Landazuri (ECU)	68.13	Paulo da Silva (BRA)	67.05
Octathlon	Lucas Conceiçâo (BRA)	5625	Sergio Vilchez (ARG)	5565	Jorge Vergara (COL)	5223
10000 metres Walk	Éider Arévalo (COL)	40:27.95 CR	Marco Antonio Rodríguez (BOL)	47:00.84	Sergio Carrillo (PER)	47:36.92
1000 metres Medley relay	Brazil^{†} Caio dos Santos; Antônio Rodrigues; Leandro de Araújo	1:54.06	Peru; Kevin Centty; Marcelo Huaroto; Andy Martínez; Edmundo Díaz	1:56.70	Colombia	1:56.71

^{†}: This is the relay team announced to compete by CBAt. Neither the order nor whether there were any substitutions is known. The announced Carlos Eduardo Pereira did not appear in the start lists.

=== Women ===
Event	Gold		Silver		Bronze	
100 metres (wind: +0.9 m/s)	Isidora Jiménez (CHI)	11.92	Jessica dos Reis (BRA)	12.00	Ramona van der Vloot (SUR)	12.12
200 metres (wind: +0.5 m/s)	Isidora Jiménez (CHI)	24.30	Selene Cevallos (ECU)	24.41	Ramona van der Vloot (SUR)	24.45
400 metres	Evelis Aguilar (COL)	55.64	Lorayna Lima (BRA)	57.33	Lourdes Dallazem (BRA)	57.83
800 metres	Ana Funes (ARG)	2:10.96	Rosa Escobar (COL)	2:13.93	Jennifer Méndez (ECU)	2:14.00
1500 metres	Érika Lima (BRA)	4:36.31	Pamela Méndez (ARG)	4:48.48	Adriely Rodrigues (BRA)	4:50.84
3000 metres	Andrea Torres (ECU)	10:01.41	Jessica Soares (BRA)	10:03.63	Charo Inga (PER)	10:12.65
2000 metres steeplechase	July da Silva (BRA)	7:09.16	Luz Mery Rojas (PER)	7:12.04	Ana Pacheco (BRA)	7:18.07
100 metres hurdles (wind: +0.9 m/s)	Trinidad León (CHI)	14.63	Natalia Pinzón (COL)	14.64	Narvelis Rengel (VEN)	14.68
400 metres hurdles	Natania Habitxreiter (BRA)	62.09	Belén Casetta (ARG)	62.48	Karen Palomeque (COL)	62.67
High jump	Betsabée Páez (ARG)	1.75 =CR	Mariana da Silva (BRA)	1.72	Mariana Rojas (ARG)	1.72
Pole vault	Angie Hernández (COL)	3.80	Isvianky Zerpa (VEN)	3.50	Macarena Fuica (CHI)	3.45
Long jump	Jessica dos Reis (BRA)	6.01 (wind: +0.3 m/s)	Andressa Fidelis (BRA)	5.60 (wind: +1.3 m/s)	Mayra Chila (ECU)	5.56 (wind: +0.3 m/s)
Triple jump	Aline do Nascimento (BRA)	12.21 (wind: -0.4 m/s)	Miriam Reyes (PER)	12.17 (wind: +1.1 m/s)	Mayra Chila (ECU)	12.03 (wind: +0.8 m/s)
Shot put	Esthefania da Costa (BRA)	13.82	Elimar Quintero (VEN)	12.27	Gisela Henríquez (PAN)	11.99
Discus throw	Esthefania da Costa (BRA)	48.22 CR	Maia Varela (ARG)	43.15	Ivana Gallardo (CHI)	39.48
Hammer throw	Paola Miranda (PAR)	49.44	Giuliana Piva (ARG)	48.97	Daniela Gómez (ARG)	46.61
Javelin throw	María Mello (URU)	42.42	Fátima Pavón (PAR)	41.66	Rocio Sabadini (ARG)	40.67
Heptathlon	Tamara de Sousa (BRA)	5347	Amanda Tomaz (BRA)	4377	Alejandra Waidele (CHI)	4168
5000 metres Walk	Yuli Capcha (PER)	22:33.63 CR AR-y	Kimberly García (PER)	23:25.76	Ana Karina Bustos (ECU)	23:52.55
1000 metres Medley relay	Brazil^{†} Jessica dos Reis; Camila de Souza; Lorayna Lima; Lourdes Dallazem	2:11.98	Colombia	2:12.47	Chile; Macarena Borie; Anneliese Grosser; Paola Paredes; Isidora Jiménez	2:13.58

^{†}: This is the relay team announced to compete by CBAt. Neither the order nor whether there were any substitutions is known.

== Medal table ==
The medal count was published.

* Host nation (Chile)

Rank	Nation	Gold	Silver	Bronze	Total
1	Brazil (BRA)	20	14	10	44
2	Chile (CHI)*	7	1	9	17
3	Colombia (COL)	4	6	4	14
4	Argentina (ARG)	3	6	4	13
5	Ecuador (ECU)	2	3	4	9
6	Peru (PER)	1	4	4	9
7	Panama (PAN)	1	1	1	3
8	Paraguay (PAR)	1	1	0	2
9	Uruguay (URU)	1	0	0	1
10	Venezuela (VEN)	0	3	2	5
11	Bolivia (BOL)	0	1	0	1
12	Suriname (SUR)	0	0	2	2
Totals (12 entries)		40	40	40	120

== Team trophies ==
The placing tables for team trophy (overall team, men and women categories) were published.

=== Total ===
The host country is highlighted in lavender blue

Rank	Nation	Points
1st place, gold medalist(s)	Brazil	409
2nd place, silver medalist(s)	Chile	189
3rd place, bronze medalist(s)	Argentina	130
4	Colombia	119
5	(Peru) Perú	88
6	Ecuador	78
7	Venezuela	50
8	(Panama) Panamá	20
9	Bolivia	19
10	Paraguay	17
11	Uruguay	13
12	Suriname	8

=== Male ===
The host country is highlighted in lavender blue

Rank	Nation	Points
1st place, gold medalist(s)	Brazil	218
2nd place, silver medalist(s)	Chile	106
3rd place, bronze medalist(s)	Colombia	70
4	Argentina	50
5	(Peru) Perú	44
6	Ecuador	31
7	Venezuela	26
8	(Panama) Panamá	16
9	Bolivia	9

=== Female ===
The host country is highlighted in lavender blue

Rank	Nation	Points
1st place, gold medalist(s)	Brazil	191
2nd place, silver medalist(s)	Chile	83
3rd place, bronze medalist(s)	Argentina	80
4	Colombia	49
5	Ecuador	47
6	(Peru) Perú	44
7	Venezuela	24
8	Paraguay	17
9	Uruguay	13
10	Bolivia	10
11	Suriname	8
12	(Panama) Panamá	4

== Participation (unofficial) ==
Detailed result lists can be found on the "World Junior Athletics History" website. An unofficial count yields the number of about 278 athletes from about 13 countries:

- Argentina (48)
- Bolivia (12)
- Brazil (66)
- Chile (56)
- Colombia (18)
- Ecuador (18)
- Guyana (1)
- (Panama) Panamá (3)
- Paraguay (7)
- (Peru) Perú (26)
- Suriname (1)
- Uruguay (6)
- Venezuela (16)
