= Lucas Carvalho =

Brazilian sprinter (born 1993)

Personal information
- Born: 16 July 1993 (age 32) Santo André, São Paulo, Brazil
- Height: 1.83 m (6 ft 0 in)
- Weight: 65 kg (143 lb)

Sport
- Sport: Athletics
- Event: 400 metres
- Club: FECAM
- Coached by: Fabrizio Rovaris Wilkens
Medal record
Men's athletics
Representing Brazil
Pan American Games
Gold medal – first place	2023 Santiago	4×400 m relay
Silver medal – second place	2023 Santiago	4×400 m relay mixed

Lucas da Silva Carvalho (born 16 July 1993) is a Brazilian sprinter specialising in the 400 metres. He represented his country at the 2017 World Championships without qualifying for the semifinals. He was also an unused reserve runner for the Brazilian 4 × 400 metres relay at the 2016 Summer Olympics. He competed at the 2020 Summer Olympics.

His personal best in the event is 44.79 seconds set in São Paulo in 2023. Earlier in his career he competed in the 110 metres hurdles.

== Personal bests ==
- 200 m: 20.40 (wind: +1.2 m/s) – (Brazil) São Paulo, 13 Dec 2020
- 400 m: 44.79 – (Brazil) São Paulo, 29 Jul 2023

All information from World Athletics profile.

== International competitions ==
Year	Competition	Venue	Position	Event	Notes
Representing Brazil
2010	South American Youth Championships	Santiago, Chile	3rd	110 m hurdles (91.4 cm)	14.26
2011	South American Junior Championships	Medellín, Colombia	2nd	110 m hurdles (99 cm)	13.92
2012	World Junior Championships	Barcelona, Spain	20th (sf)	110 m hurdles (99 cm)	13.93
2016	Ibero-American Championships	Rio de Janeiro, Brazil	–	4 × 400 m relay	DQ
2017	IAAF World Relays	Nassau, Bahamas	7th	4 × 400 m relay	3:05.96
2017	South American Championships	Asunción, Paraguay	4th	400 m	46.11
2017	South American Championships	Asunción, Paraguay	2nd	4 × 400 m relay	3:07.32
2017	World Championships	London, United Kingdom	28th (h)	400 m	45.86
2017	World Championships	London, United Kingdom	13th (h)	4 × 400 m relay	3:04.02
2018	South American Games	Cochabamba, Bolivia	1st	400 m	45.61
2018	South American Games	Cochabamba, Bolivia	3rd	4 × 100 m relay	39.54
2018	Ibero-American Championships	Trujillo, Peru	1st	400 m	45.92
2019	South American Championships	Lima, Peru	2nd	400 m	46.12
2019	South American Championships	Lima, Peru	2nd	4 × 400 m relay	3:04.13
2019	World Championships	Doha, Qatar	27th (h)	400 m	46.01
2021	South American Championships	Guayaquil, Ecuador	2nd	400 m	46.31
2021	South American Championships	Guayaquil, Ecuador	1st	4 × 400 m relay	3:04.25
2021	Olympic Games	Tokyo, Japan	32nd (h)	400 m	46.12
2022	World Indoor Championships	Belgrade, Serbia	–	400 m	DQ
2022	World Championships	Eugene, United States	38th (h)	400 m	47.53
2022	South American Games	Asunción, Paraguay	3rd	400 m	46.47
2022	South American Games	Asunción, Paraguay	2nd	4 × 400 m relay	3:06.79
2023	South American Championships	São Paulo, Brazil	8th	400 m	47.64
2023	South American Championships	São Paulo, Brazil	2nd	4 × 400 m relay	3:04.15
2023	World Championships	Budapest, Hungary	25th (h)	400 m	45.34
2023	Pan American Games	Santiago, Chile	4th	400 m	46.84
2023	Pan American Games	Santiago, Chile	1st	4 × 400 m relay	3:03.92
2024	South American Indoor Championships	Cochabamba, Bolivia	4th	400 m	47.88
2024	World Indoor Championships	Glasgow, United Kingdom	10th (sf)	400 m	47.38
2024	Ibero-American Championships	Cuiabá, Brazil	–	400 m	DNF
2024	Olympic Games	Paris, France	17th (rep)	400 m	46.25
2024	Olympic Games	Paris, France	11th (h)	4 × 400 m relay	3:00.95
2025	South American Championships	Mar del Plata, Argentina	4th	400 m	47.11
2025	South American Championships	Mar del Plata, Argentina	1st	4 × 400 m relay	3:07.40
