= Carolina Alves =

Carolina Alves may refer to:

- Carolina Cristina Alves, Brazilian-British economist
- Carolina Alves (tennis) (born 1996), Brazilian tennis player
- Jéssica Carolina Alves dos Reis (born 1993), Brazilian athlete specializing in the long jump
