= Athletics at the 2017 Bolivarian Games – Results =

These are the full results of the athletics competition at the 2017 Bolivarian Games which took place between 21 and 25 November 2017 at the Bureche Athletics Stadium in Santa Marta, Colombia.

== Men's results ==
=== 100 metres ===
Heats – 21 November
Wind:
Heat 1: -1.4 m/s, Heat 2: -1.3 m/s

Rank	Heat	Name	Nationality	Time	Notes
1	1	Alex Quiñónez	Ecuador	10.60	Q
2	1	Diego Palomeque	Colombia	10.61	Q
3	2	Jhonny Rentería	Colombia	10.67	Q
4	1	Rafael Vásquez	Venezuela	10.71	Q
5	1	Mateo Edward	Panama	10.72	q
6	2	Carlos Perlaza	Ecuador	10.86	Q
7	2	Yeiker Mendoza	Venezuela	10.90	Q
8	2	Jesús Manuel Cáceres	Paraguay	10.97	q
9	2	Facundo Riera	Bolivia	11.07	
10	1	Carlos Aban	Bolivia	11.28	
11	2	Fabrizio Mautino	Peru	26.62	

Final – 21 November

Wind: +1.6 m/s

Rank	Lane	Name	Nationality	Time	Notes
1st place, gold medalist(s)	4	Alex Quiñónez	Ecuador	10.13	GR
2nd place, silver medalist(s)	5	Diego Palomeque	Colombia	10.31	
3rd place, bronze medalist(s)	6	Jhonny Rentería	Colombia	10.44	
4	8	Mateo Edward	Panama	10.58	
5	2	Rafael Vásquez	Venezuela	10.59	
6	3	Yeiker Mendoza	Venezuela	10.61	
7	1	Jesús Manuel Cáceres	Paraguay	10.69	
8	7	Carlos Perlaza	Ecuador	10.90	

=== 200 metres ===
Heats – 22 November
Wind:
Heat 1: +1.1 m/s, Heat 2: +0.5 m/s

Rank	Heat	Name	Nationality	Time	Notes
1	1	Bernardo Baloyes	Colombia	20.95	Q
2	1	Alex Quiñónez	Ecuador	21.02	Q
3	2	Freddy Maidana	Paraguay	21.13	Q
4	1	Luguelín Santos	Dominican Republic	21.19	Q
5	1	Arturo Ramírez	Venezuela	21.36	q
6	2	Rafael Vásquez	Venezuela	21.53	Q
7	1	Christopher Ortiz	Paraguay	21.58	q
8	2	Deivis Díaz	Colombia	21.62	Q
9	1	Virjilio Griggs	Panama	21.65	
10	2	Nicholás Dagnino	Chile	21.83	
11	2	Jhon Valencia	Ecuador	22.18	
12	2	Bruno Rojas	Bolivia	22.27	
13	1	Carlos Aban	Bolivia	22.43	

Final – 22 November

Wind: +1.3 m/s

Rank	Lane	Name	Nationality	Time	Notes
1st place, gold medalist(s)	4	Alex Quiñónez	Ecuador	20.27	GR, NR
2nd place, silver medalist(s)	5	Bernardo Baloyes	Colombia	20.77	
3rd place, bronze medalist(s)	7	Luguelín Santos	Dominican Republic	20.95	
4	3	Rafael Vásquez	Venezuela	21.19	
5	6	Freddy Maidana	Paraguay	21.21	
6	2	Arturo Ramírez	Venezuela	21.25	
7	1	Christopher Ortiz	Paraguay	21.50	
8	8	Deivis Díaz	Colombia	21.67	

=== 400 metres ===
Heats – 21 November

Rank	Heat	Name	Nationality	Time	Notes
1	2	Jhon Perlaza	Colombia	47.38	Q
2	2	Alberto Aguilar	Venezuela	47.41	Q
3	1	Luguelín Santos	Dominican Republic	47.54	Q
4	1	Kelvis Padrino	Venezuela	47.72	Q
5	1	Yilmar Herrera	Colombia	48.41	Q
6	1	Rafael Muñoz	Chile	48.50	q
7	2	Sergio Aldea	Chile	48.67	Q
8	2	Brayant Erazo	Peru	49.03	q
9	2	Nilo Duré	Paraguay	49.20	
10	1	Fernando Copa	Bolivia	50.11	
	1	Paulo Herrera	Peru	DQ	
	2	Emerson Chala	Ecuador	DNS	

Final – 21 November

Rank	Lane	Name	Nationality	Time	Notes
1st place, gold medalist(s)	3	Luguelín Santos	Dominican Republic	45.44	
2nd place, silver medalist(s)	4	Jhon Perlaza	Colombia	45.80	
3rd place, bronze medalist(s)	5	Alberto Aguilar	Venezuela	46.68	
4	6	Kelvis Padrino	Venezuela	47.00	
5	2	Yilmar Herrera	Colombia	47.49	
6	7	Sergio Aldea	Chile	47.91	
7	1	Rafael Muñoz	Chile	48.47	
	8	Brayant Erazo	Peru	DQ	

=== 800 metres ===
23 November

Rank	Name	Nationality	Time	Notes
1st place, gold medalist(s)	Rafith Rodríguez	Colombia	1:46.84	
2nd place, silver medalist(s)	Lucirio Antonio Garrido	Venezuela	1:48.12	
3rd place, bronze medalist(s)	Jelssin Robledo	Colombia	1:49.20	
4	Chamar Chambers	Panama	1:49.35	
5	Jonathan Bolados	Chile	1:50.24	
6	Willian García	Peru	1:50.25	
7	Cristofer Jarpa	Chile	1:51.51	
8	Alberto Aguilar	Venezuela	1:54.54	

=== 1500 metres ===
21 November

Rank	Name	Nationality	Time	Notes
1st place, gold medalist(s)	Carlos Díaz	Chile	3:45.58	
2nd place, silver medalist(s)	Freddy Espinoza	Colombia	3:46.24	
3rd place, bronze medalist(s)	Lucirio Antonio Garrido	Venezuela	3:47.92	
4	Carlos Hernández	Colombia	3:49.99	
5	Whinton Palma	Venezuela	3:50.46	
6	Mario Bazán	Peru	3:50.79	
	William García	Peru	DNF	

=== 5000 metres ===
24 November

Rank	Name	Nationality	Time	Notes
1st place, gold medalist(s)	Carlos Díaz	Chile	14:02.92	
2nd place, silver medalist(s)	Marvin Blanco	Venezuela	14:05.90	
3rd place, bronze medalist(s)	José Luis Rojas	Peru	14:07.40	
4	Daniel Toroya	Bolivia	14:09.24	
5	Carlos San Martín	Colombia	14:13.08	
6	Vidal Basco	Bolivia	14:14.06	
7	Iván Darío González	Colombia	14:22.67	
8	Matias Silva	Chile	14:25.69	
9	Walter Niña	Peru	14:42.51	
	Luis Orta	Venezuela	DNF	

=== 10,000 metres ===
22 November

Rank	Name	Nationality	Time	Notes
1st place, gold medalist(s)	Luis Ostos	Peru	28:56.95	GR
2nd place, silver medalist(s)	José Mauricio González	Colombia	29:36.29	
3rd place, bronze medalist(s)	Luis Orta	Venezuela	29:51.26	
4	Miguel Almache	Ecuador	30:12.14	
5	Cristhian Pacheco	Peru	30:20.33	
	Daniel Toroya	Bolivia	DNF	
	Vidal Basco	Bolivia	DNF	
	Miguel Amador	Colombia	DNF	
	Marvin Blanco	Venezuela	DNF	

=== Half marathon ===
25 November

Rank	Name	Nationality	Time	Notes
1st place, gold medalist(s)	Jeison Suárez	Colombia	1:06:53	
2nd place, silver medalist(s)	Diego Colorado	Colombia	1:07:15	
3rd place, bronze medalist(s)	Segundo Jami	Ecuador	1:07:41	
4	Ulises Martín	Peru	1:08:16	
5	Nelson Ito	Peru	1:08:26	
6	Derlys Ayala	Paraguay	1:08:42	
7	Jorge César Fernández	Bolivia	1:10:14	
8	Daniel Estrada	Chile	1:10:55	
9	Juan Jorge Gonzáles	Bolivia	1:11:27	
10	Byron Piedra	Ecuador	1:12:23	
11	Whinton Palma	Venezuela	1:13:07	
	Cristopher Guajardo	Chile	DNF	
	Jorge Castel	Panama	DNF	
	Didimo Sánchez	Venezuela	DNS	

=== 110 metres hurdles ===
21 November
Wind: +0.8 m/s

Rank	Lane	Name	Nationality	Time	Notes
1st place, gold medalist(s)	4	Javier McFarlane	Peru	13.72	
2nd place, silver medalist(s)	3	Juan Carlos Moreno	Colombia	13.89	
3rd place, bronze medalist(s)	2	Yeison Rivas	Colombia	13.89	
4	5	Jorge McFarlane	Peru	14.23	
5	6	Gerson Izaguirre	Venezuela	14.37	
6	7	Jefferson González	Venezuela	14.51	

=== 400 metres hurdles ===
23 November

Rank	Lane	Name	Nationality	Time	Notes
1st place, gold medalist(s)	4	Yeison Rivas	Colombia	50.47	
2nd place, silver medalist(s)	5	Emerson Chala	Ecuador	50.53	
3rd place, bronze medalist(s)	6	Wilson Bello	Venezuela	50.74	
4	3	Andrés Toro	Venezuela	51.84	
5	2	Paulo Herrera	Peru	53.44	

=== 3000 metres steeplechase ===
24 November

Rank	Name	Nationality	Time	Notes
1st place, gold medalist(s)	José Peña	Venezuela	8:39.99	
2nd place, silver medalist(s)	Gerard Giraldo	Colombia	8:40.12	
3rd place, bronze medalist(s)	Andrés Camargo	Colombia	8:40.80	
4	Mario Bazán	Peru	8:42.52	
5	Víctor Aguilar	Bolivia	9:13.75	
	José González	Venezuela	DNF	

=== 4 × 100 metres relay ===
23 November

Rank	Lane	Team	Name	Time	Notes
1st place, gold medalist(s)	5	Venezuela	Yeiker Mendoza, Rafael Vásquez, Alexis Nieves, Arturo Ramírez	39.40	
2nd place, silver medalist(s)	4	Colombia	Jhonny Rentería, Diego Palomeque, Deivis Díaz, Bernardo Baloyes	39.58	
3rd place, bronze medalist(s)	3	Ecuador	Anderson Quintero, Carlos Perlaza, Jhon Valencia, Alex Quiñónez	39.83	
4	2	Bolivia	Facundo Riera, Carlos Aban, Fernando Copa, Bruno Rojas	41.63	
	6	Paraguay	Christopher Ortiz, Nilo Duré, Jesús Cáceres, Fredy Maidana	DQ	

=== 4 × 400 metres relay ===
23 November

Rank	Lane	Team	Name	Time	Notes
1st place, gold medalist(s)	4	Colombia	Yilmar Herrera, Rafith Rodríguez, Jelssin Robledo, Jhon Perlaza	3:06.14	
2nd place, silver medalist(s)	5	Venezuela	Alberto Aguilar, Kelvis Padrino, Luis Felipe Rodríguez, Omar Longart	3:06.32	
3rd place, bronze medalist(s)	3	Chile	Sergio Aldea, José Manuel Del Prado, Alejandro Francesco, Rafael Muñoz	3:10.29	
4	6	Ecuador	Anderson Quintero, Carlos Perlaza, Alex Quiñónez, Emerson Chala	3:12.81	

=== 20 kilometres walk ===
22 November

Rank	Name	Nationality	Time	Notes
1st place, gold medalist(s)	Manuel Esteban Soto	Colombia	1:26:32	
2nd place, silver medalist(s)	Mauricio Arteaga	Ecuador	1:27:03	
3rd place, bronze medalist(s)	Éider Arévalo	Colombia	1:27:47	
4	Brian Pintado	Ecuador	1:28:20	
5	Yassir Cabrera	Panama	1:34:57	
5	Pablo Armando Rodríguez	Bolivia	1:39:34	
	Marco Antonio Rodríguez	Bolivia	DNF	
	Luis Henry Campos	Peru	DNF	
	Richard Vargas	Venezuela	DNF	
	César Rodríguez	Peru	DQ	

=== 50 kilometres walk ===
22 November

Rank	Name	Nationality	Time	Notes
1st place, gold medalist(s)	Andrés Chocho	Ecuador	4:14:20	
2nd place, silver medalist(s)	Ronald Quispe	Bolivia	4:25:30	
3rd place, bronze medalist(s)	Claudio Villanueva	Ecuador	4:49:33	
	Rodrigo Zeballos	Bolivia	DNF	
	Ferney Rojas	Colombia	DNF	
	Pavel Chihuán	Peru	DNF	
	Yerenman Salazar	Venezuela	DNF	

=== High jump ===
23 November

Rank	Name	Nationality	1.95	2.00	2.03	2.06	2.09	2.12	2.15	2.18	2.21	2.24	2.27	Result	Notes
1st place, gold medalist(s)	Eure Yáñez	Venezuela	–	–	–	–	–	o	o	o	–	o	xxx	2.24	
2nd place, silver medalist(s)	Arturo Chávez	Peru	–	o	–	o	xo	o	xo	o	–	x–	xx	2.18	
3rd place, bronze medalist(s)	Alexander Bowen	Panama	o	o	–	xo	–	xo	o	xx–	x			2.15	
4	Jan Westchreicher	Peru	–	o	–	o	o	xo	xxo	xxx				2.15	
5	Gilmar Correa	Colombia	–	–	xo	xo	xxo	xxx						2.09	
6	Jaime Escobar	Panama	xo	xo	o	xxx								2.03	

=== Pole vault ===
22 November

Rank	Name	Nationality	4.40	4.50	4.80	4.90	5.00	5.05	5.10	5.20	5.25	5.30	5.41	Result	Notes
1st place, gold medalist(s)	Walter Viáfara	Colombia	–	–	–	o	–	–	o	x–	o	–	xxx	5.25	GR
2nd place, silver medalist(s)	José Rodolfo Pacho	Ecuador	–	–	–	o	o	–	o	o	–	xxx		5.20	
3rd place, bronze medalist(s)	Pablo Chaverra	Colombia	–	–	o	o	o	xxx						5.00	
4	Joaquín León	Peru	o	xxx										4.40	
	Gerson Izaguirre	Venezuela												NM	
	Ronnys Sevilla	Venezuela	–	xxx										NM	
	Josué Mauricio Gutiérrez	Peru	–	xxx										NM	

=== Long jump ===
24 November

Rank	Name	Nationality	#1	#2	#3	#4	#5	#6	Result	Notes
1st place, gold medalist(s)	Santiago Cova	Venezuela	6.65w	7.81	7.78	x	–	7.59	7.81	
2nd place, silver medalist(s)	Jorge McFarlane	Peru	7.48	–	7.49	5.23	7.65	7.54	7.65	
3rd place, bronze medalist(s)	Eddy Florián	Dominican Republic	x	7.43	7.50	7.48	x	7.42	7.50	
4	Eduardo Landeta	Ecuador	7.33	x	7.21w	7.16	3.40	7.43	7.43	
5	Yeimer Palacios	Colombia	7.40w	x	7.34w	7.27	7.42	7.33	7.42	
6	José Luis Mandros	Peru	7.39	x	7.17	7.05	7.33	7.38w	7.39	
7	Arnovis Dalmero	Colombia	7.01	7.35	7.27	6.97	7.28	7.11w	7.35	
8	Jhamal Bowen	Panama	7.25	x	7.18	x	7.20w	7.20	7.25	
9	Gerson Izaguirre	Venezuela	7.01	x	x				7.01	
10	Daniel Pineda	Chile	x	x	6.95				6.95	

=== Triple jump ===
22 November

Rank	Name	Nationality	#1	#2	#3	#4	#5	#6	Result	Notes
1st place, gold medalist(s)	Jhon Murillo	Colombia	15.70	16.16	–	15.84	–	–	16.16	
2nd place, silver medalist(s)	Divie Murillo	Colombia	15.87	13.35	15.07	15.34	15.26	–	15.87	
3rd place, bronze medalist(s)	Santiago Cova	Venezuela	15.60	–	15.85	–	14.65	15.80	15.85	
4	Eddy Florián	Dominican Republic	x	14.87	15.54	15.57	x	15.34	15.57	
5	Roy Martínez	Venezuela	15.26	15.52	15.47	x	x	13.78	15.52	
6	Frixon Chila	Ecuador	x	x	15.23	14.64	14.38	14.45	15.23	
7	Eduardo Landeta	Ecuador	x	15.19	–	–	–	–	15.19	
8	Juan Mosquera	Panama	x	14.46	14.99	x	15.04	x	15.04	

=== Shot put ===
24 November

Rank	Name	Nationality	#1	#2	#3	#4	#5	#6	Result	Notes
1st place, gold medalist(s)	Eder Moreno	Colombia	18.16	17.89	x	17.91	17.97	17.95	18.16	
2nd place, silver medalist(s)	Jhon Zea	Colombia	16.63	16.96	17.33	17.09	17.30	17.92	17.92	
3rd place, bronze medalist(s)	Aldo González	Bolivia	17.28	17.78	17.77	x	17.56	17.22	17.78	
4	Matías López	Chile	15.88	16.41	17.23	17.62	x	x	17.62	
5	Eduardo Espín	Ecuador	16.48	5.92	x	x	16.51	16.26	16.51	

=== Discus throw ===
22 November

Rank	Name	Nationality	#1	#2	#3	#4	#5	#6	Result	Notes
1st place, gold medalist(s)	Juan José Caicedo	Ecuador	53.28	54.05	56.52	57.05	–	57.99	57.99	NR
2nd place, silver medalist(s)	José Miguel Ballivian	Chile	53.27	55.53	x	52.02	54.01	53.99	55.53	
3rd place, bronze medalist(s)	Claudio Romero	Chile	53.42	x	x	x	x	x	53.42	
4	Juan José Benitez	Colombia	49.14	45.89	x	x	x	x	49.14	
5	Eduardo Espín	Ecuador	45.69	46.83	42.13	46.70	x	42.87	46.83	

=== Hammer throw ===
21 November

Rank	Name	Nationality	#1	#2	#3	#4	#5	#6	Result	Notes
1st place, gold medalist(s)	Hevert Álvarez	Chile	59.23	62.08	61.81	59.20	60.68	57.73	62.08	
2nd place, silver medalist(s)	Elías Díaz	Colombia	58.46	58.29	58.67	x	56.76	61.49	61.49	
3rd place, bronze medalist(s)	Daniel Aguirre	Colombia	60.86	61.42	x	x	59.93	61.27	61.42	
4	Joseph Melgar	Peru	x	x	58.99	x	57.16	58.00	58.99	

=== Javelin throw ===
21 November

Rank	Name	Nationality	#1	#2	#3	#4	#5	#6	Result	Notes
1st place, gold medalist(s)	Arley Ibargüen	Colombia	68.99	73.32	74.91	74.67	75.46	78.87	78.87	GR
2nd place, silver medalist(s)	Dayron Márquez	Colombia	69.48	71.49	75.52	76.75	76.17	71.93	76.75	
3rd place, bronze medalist(s)	Billy Julio	Venezuela	70.72	70.10	68.02	70.77	70.35	64.92	70.77	
4	José Escobar	Ecuador	69.62	67.75	70.35	66.55	63.79	67.99	70.35	
5	Víctor Fatecha	Paraguay	68.92	69.82	69.00	–	x	66.13	69.82	

=== Decathlon ===
22–23 November

The highest mark recorded in each event is highlighted in yellow

Rank	Name	Nationality	100m	LJ	SP	HJ	400m	110m H	DT	PV	JT	1500m	Points	Notes
1st place, gold medalist(s)	José Lemos	Colombia	11.13	6.66	16.91	1.91	51.65	14.58	52.26	4.20	67.50	5:13.72	7762	GR, NR
2nd place, silver medalist(s)	Òscar Campos	Venezuela	11.07	6.52	12.67	1.70	51.36	14.82	41.11	4.00	55.24	4:44.37	6985	
3rd place, bronze medalist(s)	Georni Jaramillo	Venezuela	10.84	7.25	14.48	1.85	49.52	14.07	44.11	NM	59.91	5:48.84	6797	

== Women's results ==
=== 100 metres ===
Heats – 21 November
Wind:
Heat 1: -1.4 m/s, Heat 2: -1.3 m/s

Rank	Heat	Name	Nationality	Time	Notes
1	2	Marizol Landázuri	Ecuador	11.63	Q
2	2	Andrea Purica	Venezuela	11.64	Q
3	1	Ángela Tenorio	Ecuador	11.66	Q
4	2	Eliecith Palacios	Colombia	11.84	Q
5	1	Mariely Sánchez	Dominican Republic	12.03	Q
6	1	Nediam Vargas	Venezuela	12.05	Q
7	1	Darlenys Obregón	Colombia	12.13	q
8	2	Carolina Ocampo	Bolivia	12.43	q
9	1	Gabriela Delgado	Peru	12.52	
10	2	Briza Duré	Paraguay	12.75	
11	1	Xenia Hiebert	Paraguay	13.73	

Final – 21 November

Wind: +1.3 m/s

Rank	Lane	Name	Nationality	Time	Notes
1st place, gold medalist(s)	6	Ángela Tenorio	Ecuador	11.26	
2nd place, silver medalist(s)	4	Marizol Landázuri	Ecuador	11.30	
3rd place, bronze medalist(s)	5	Andrea Purica	Venezuela	11.53	
4	7	Mariely Sánchez	Dominican Republic	11.55	
5	3	Eliecith Palacios	Colombia	11.70	
6	1	Darlenys Obregón	Colombia	11.84	
7	2	Nediam Vargas	Venezuela	11.90	
8	8	Carolina Ocampo	Bolivia	12.35	

=== 200 metres ===
Heats – 22 November
Wind:
Heat 1: +1.1 m/s, Heat 2: +0.5 m/s

Rank	Heat	Name	Nationality	Time	Notes
1	2	Mariely Sánchez	Dominican Republic	23.94	Q
2	2	Nercely Soto	Venezuela	24.09	Q
3	2	Marizol Landázuri	Ecuador	24.13	Q
4	1	Darlenys Obregón	Colombia	24.18	Q
5	1	Ángela Tenorio	Ecuador	24.26	Q
6	2	Jennifer Padilla	Colombia	24.50	q
7	1	Nediam Vargas	Venezuela	24.53	Q
8	1	Gabriela Delgado	Peru	25.26	q
9	1	Briza Duré	Paraguay	26.21	
	2	Maitte Torres	Peru	DNS	

Final – 22 November

Wind: +0.5 m/s

Rank	Lane	Name	Nationality	Time	Notes
1st place, gold medalist(s)	3	Nercely Soto	Venezuela	22.89	
2nd place, silver medalist(s)	6	Ángela Tenorio	Ecuador	23.63	
3rd place, bronze medalist(s)	5	Marizol Landázuri	Ecuador	23.65	
4	7	Mariely Sánchez	Dominican Republic	23.67	
5	2	Nediam Vargas	Venezuela	24.42	
6	4	Darlenys Obregón	Colombia	24.57	
7	1	Gabriela Delgado	Peru	25.06	
	8	Jennifer Padilla	Colombia	DNF	

=== 400 metres ===
Heats – 21 November

Rank	Heat	Name	Nationality	Time	Notes
1	1	Jennifer Padilla	Colombia	54.18	Q
2	1	María Fernanda Mackenna	Chile	54.49	Q
3	1	Maitte Torres	Peru	54.74	Q
4	1	Nicole Minota	Ecuador	55.00	q
5	2	María José Echeverría	Chile	55.01	Q
6	2	Eliana Chávez	Colombia	55.27	Q
7	1	María Simancas	Venezuela	55.31	q
8	1	Cecilia Gómez	Bolivia	55.55	
9	2	Nercely Soto	Venezuela	57.22	Q
10	2	Coraime Cortez	Ecuador	57.72	
11	2	Fátima Amarilla	Paraguay	57.72	

Final – 21 November

Rank	Lane	Name	Nationality	Time	Notes
1st place, gold medalist(s)	8	Nercely Soto	Venezuela	52.43	
2nd place, silver medalist(s)	4	Jennifer Padilla	Colombia	53.43	
3rd place, bronze medalist(s)	5	María Fernanda Mackenna	Chile	54.05	
4	1	Maitte Torres	Peru	54.25	
5	7	María Simancas	Venezuela	54.38	
6	2	Eliana Chávez	Colombia	54.49	
7	3	María José Echeverría	Chile	54.82	
8	6	Nicole Minota	Ecuador	55.69	

=== 800 metres ===
23 November

Rank	Name	Nationality	Time	Notes
1st place, gold medalist(s)	Rosangelica Escobar	Colombia	2:03.41	
2nd place, silver medalist(s)	Andrea Calderón	Ecuador	2:04.00	NR
3rd place, bronze medalist(s)	Johana Arrieta	Colombia	2:04.61	
4	Andrea Ferris	Panama	2:07.43	
5	Ydanis Navas	Venezuela	2:07.62	
6	Odelanis Monges	Venezuela	2:13.83	
7	Denise Mejía	Peru	2:14.32	

=== 1500 metres ===
21 November

Rank	Name	Nationality	Time	Notes
1st place, gold medalist(s)	Muriel Coneo	Colombia	4:15.64	
2nd place, silver medalist(s)	Rosibel García	Colombia	4:18.35	
3rd place, bronze medalist(s)	Zulema Arenas	Peru	4:19.03	
4	Andrea Ferris	Panama	4:19.59	
5	Katherine Tisalema	Ecuador	4:26.27	
6	Soledad Torre	Peru	4:28.61	

=== 5000 metres ===
23 November

Rank	Name	Nationality	Time	Notes
1st place, gold medalist(s)	Muriel Coneo	Colombia	16:08.29	
2nd place, silver medalist(s)	Carmen Toaquinza	Ecuador	16:13.49	
3rd place, bronze medalist(s)	Lidia Meneses	Peru	16:13.80	
4	Soledad Torre	Peru	16:31.80	
5	Jessica Paguay	Ecuador	16:33.55	
6	Carolina Tabares	Colombia	16:36.41	
7	Irma Vila	Bolivia	16:56.67	
8	Jennifer González	Chile	17:15.80	

=== 10,000 metres ===
21 November

Rank	Name	Nationality	Time	Notes
1st place, gold medalist(s)	Inés Melchor	Peru	33:57.13	
2nd place, silver medalist(s)	Luz Mery Rojas	Peru	33:59.58	
3rd place, bronze medalist(s)	Carmen Martínez	Paraguay	34:07.14	
4	Carmen Toaquinza	Ecuador	34:50.83	
5	Ángela Figueroa	Colombia	34:56.07	
6	Jéssica Paguay	Ecuador	35:20.59	
7	Carolina Tabares	Colombia	35:38.08	
8	Claudia Cornejo	Bolivia	37:40.12	

=== Half marathon ===
25 November

Rank	Name	Nationality	Time	Notes
1st place, gold medalist(s)	Gladys Tejeda	Peru	1:14:55	GR
2nd place, silver medalist(s)	Angie Orjuela	Colombia	1:15:09	
3rd place, bronze medalist(s)	Diana Landi	Ecuador	1:17:23	
4	Rosa Chacha	Ecuador	1:17:52	
5	Clara Canchanya	Peru	1:18:33	
6	Ruby Riativa	Colombia	1:18:55	
7	Salome Mendoza	Bolivia	1:19:32	

=== 100 metres hurdles ===
21 November
Wind: +0.8 m/s

Rank	Lane	Name	Nationality	Time	Notes
1st place, gold medalist(s)	4	Génesis Romero	Venezuela	13.19	
2nd place, silver medalist(s)	5	Eliecith Palacios	Colombia	13.42	
3rd place, bronze medalist(s)	7	Maribel Caicedo	Ecuador	13.46	
4	6	Diana Bazalar	Peru	13.53	
5	3	Melissa Gonzalez	Colombia	14.21	
6	2	Yoveiny Mota	Venezuela	14.38	

=== 400 metres hurdles ===
23 November

Rank	Lane	Name	Nationality	Time	Notes
~~1~~	8	Yulieth Caballero	Colombia	~~58.04~~	DQ, Doping
1st place, gold medalist(s)	6	Gianna Woodruff	Panama	58.06	
2nd place, silver medalist(s)	5	Melissa Gonzalez	Colombia	58.14	
3rd place, bronze medalist(s)	7	Virginia Villalba	Ecuador	59.09	
4	3	Génesis Romero	Venezuela	1:00.14	
5	4	Yenisquel Alfonso	Venezuela	1:00.66	
6	1	Marina Poroso	Ecuador	1:00.92	
7	2	Fátima Amarilla	Paraguay	1:02.04	

=== 3000 metres steeplechase ===
23 November

Rank	Name	Nationality	Time	Notes
1st place, gold medalist(s)	Zulema Arenas	Peru	9:52.32	GR, NR
2nd place, silver medalist(s)	Rolanda Bell	Panama	10:08.56	
3rd place, bronze medalist(s)	Andrea Ferris	Panama	10:09.05	
4	Katherine Tisalema	Ecuador	10:20.73	
5	Rina Cjuro	Peru	10:23.72	
6	Leidy Romero	Colombia	10:49.90	
	Muriel Coneo	Colombia	DNS	

=== 4 × 100 metres relay ===
23 November

Rank	Lane	Team	Name	Time	Notes
1st place, gold medalist(s)	5	Venezuela	Nediam Vargas, Andrea Purica, Génesis Romero, Nercely Soto	44.15	
2nd place, silver medalist(s)	4	Ecuador	Maribel Caicedo, Narcisa Landazuri, Marina Poroso, Ángela Tenorio	45.15	
3rd place, bronze medalist(s)	3	Colombia	Melissa Gonzalez, Eliecith Palacios, Darlenys Obregón, Eliana Chávez	45.96	
4	6	Peru	Paola Mautino, Maitte Torres, Diana Bazalar, Gabriela Delgado	46.28	
5	7	Bolivia	Lindy Cavero, Carolina Ocampo, Valeria Quispe, Cecilia Gómez	47.41	

=== 4 × 400 metres relay ===
23 November

Rank	Lane	Team	Name	Time	Notes
1st place, gold medalist(s)	2	Chile	Paula Goñi, Carmen Mansilla, María Fernanda Mackenna, María José Echeverría	3:37.93	
~~2~~	3	Colombia	Eliana Chávez, Johana Arrieta, Julieth Caballero, Rosangelica Escobar	~~3:38.49~~	DQ, Doping
2nd place, silver medalist(s)	5	Venezuela	Pamela Milano, Ydanis Navas, María Simancas, Nercely Soto	3:40.81	
3rd place, bronze medalist(s)	4	Ecuador	Marina Poroso, Andrea Calderón, Virginia Villalba, Nicole Minota	3:41.69	

=== 20 kilometres walk ===
22 November

Rank	Name	Nationality	Time	Notes
1st place, gold medalist(s)	Sandra Arenas	Colombia	1:32:39	GR
2nd place, silver medalist(s)	Kimberly García	Peru	1:33:07	
3rd place, bronze medalist(s)	Ángela Castro	Bolivia	1:34:05	
4	Paola Pérez	Ecuador	1:35:30	
5	Sandra Galvis	Colombia	1:36:19	
6	Janeth Guamán	Ecuador	1:40:45	
7	Odeth Huanca	Bolivia	1:49:55	
	Milangela Rosales	Venezuela	DNF	
	Jessica Hancco	Peru	DQ	

=== High jump ===
24 November

Rank	Name	Nationality	1.60	1.65	1.70	1.75	1.78	1.81	Result	Notes
1st place, gold medalist(s)	María Fernanda Murillo	Colombia	–	–	o	–	xo	xxx	1.78	
2nd place, silver medalist(s)	Amanda Vergara	Venezuela	–	–	o	xo	xo	xxx	1.78	
3rd place, bronze medalist(s)	Joyce Micolta	Ecuador	–	o	xxo	o	xxo	x	1.78	
4	Jennifer Rodríguez	Colombia	o	o	xo	xxx			1.70	
5	Diana Ramos	Venezuela	o	xxx					1.60	

=== Pole vault ===
21 November

Rank	Name	Nationality	3.40	3.60	3.70	3.80	3.90	4.00	4.05	4.10	4.20	4.35	Result	Notes
1st place, gold medalist(s)	Robeilys Peinado	Venezuela	–	–	–	–	–	o	–	–	o	xxx	4.20	
2nd place, silver medalist(s)	Katherine Castillo	Colombia	–	–	o	–	xo	o	–	xxx			4.00	
3rd place, bronze medalist(s)	Carmen Villanueva	Venezuela	–	o	–	xo	xx–	xo	xxx				4.00	
4	Milena Agudelo	Colombia	–	–	o	xxx							3.70	
	Nicole Hein	Peru	xxx										NM	
	Catalina Amarilla	Paraguay	xxx										NM	

=== Long jump ===
23 November

Rank	Name	Nationality	#1	#2	#3	#4	#5	#6	Result	Notes
1st place, gold medalist(s)	Nathalee Aranda	Panama	6.25	6.37	6.17	x	x	6.46	6.46	
2nd place, silver medalist(s)	Macarena Reyes	Chile	6.13	6.13	6.18w	6.10	6.17	6.34	6.34	
3rd place, bronze medalist(s)	Paola Mautino	Peru	6.02	5.93	6.08	x	x	6.25	6.25	
4	Yosiris Urrutia	Colombia	5.72	x	x	5.82	6.03	5.74	6.03	
5	Lindy Cavero	Bolivia	5.26	5.43	x	x	x	5.83	5.83	
6	Valeria Quispe	Bolivia	x	5.80w	x	5.63	x	5.62	5.80w	
7	Alexa Morey	Peru	5.62	5.76	x	x	x	x	5.76	
8	Ana José Tima	Dominican Republic	5.60	5.71	x	x	–	–	5.71	
9	Xenia Hiebert	Paraguay	4.60	5.09	4.36				5.09	

=== Triple jump ===
21 November

Rank	Name	Nationality	#1	#2	#3	#4	#5	#6	Result	Notes
1st place, gold medalist(s)	Ana José Tima	Dominican Republic	13.04	13.34	13.37	13.39	x	13.50	13.50	
2nd place, silver medalist(s)	Mirian Reyes	Peru	12.74	13.07	13.20	x	x	12.99	13.20	
3rd place, bronze medalist(s)	Valeria Quispe	Bolivia	12.76	x	13.17	x	11.77	x	13.17	NR
4	Yosiris Urrutia	Colombia	x	x	x	x	x	13.11	13.11	
5	Silvana Segura	Peru	13.00	12.87	12.96	x	x	x	13.00	

=== Shot put ===
21 November

Rank	Name	Nationality	#1	#2	#3	#4	#5	#6	Result	Notes
1st place, gold medalist(s)	Natalia Duco	Chile	17.31	17.38	17.21	17.94	17.99	17.82	17.99	GR
2nd place, silver medalist(s)	Sandra Lemos	Colombia	16.87	x	x	17.26	17.87	17.70	17.87	
3rd place, bronze medalist(s)	Ahymara Espinoza	Venezuela	15.85	16.57	16.52	x	x	x	16.57	
4	Jessica Molina	Ecuador	11.59	12.56	12.75	13.21	13.00	13.33	13.33	

=== Discus throw ===
22 November

Rank	Name	Nationality	#1	#2	#3	#4	#5	#6	Result	Notes
1st place, gold medalist(s)	Karen Gallardo	Chile	55.35	55.73	52.28	54.96	53.79	54.98	55.73	
2nd place, silver medalist(s)	Aixa Middleton	Panama	52.24	54.74	49.05	x	x	53.75	54.74	
3rd place, bronze medalist(s)	Johana Martínez	Colombia	x	51.21	53.35	53.67	?	?	53.67	

=== Hammer throw ===
24 November

Rank	Name	Nationality	#1	#2	#3	#4	#5	#6	Result	Notes
1st place, gold medalist(s)	Rosa Rodríguez	Venezuela	x	x	66.31	x	x	64.53	66.31	
2nd place, silver medalist(s)	Johana Moreno	Colombia	x	x	62.17	x	x	59.51	62.17	
3rd place, bronze medalist(s)	Maryuri Orozco	Colombia	x	x	61.58	55.38	61.92	58.86	61.92	
4	Valeria Chiliquinga	Ecuador	61.12	54.47	61.44	57.22	60.70	60.57	61.44	
5	Mariana García	Chile	59.79	57.72	58.71	54.86	57.10	53.81	59.79	
6	Fátima Ramos	Peru	x	54.30	x	x	x	55.32	55.32	
7	Jessica Molina	Ecuador	50.43	50.92	51.89	53.05	53.10	x	53.10	

=== Javelin throw ===
24 November

Rank	Name	Nationality	#1	#2	#3	#4	#5	#6	Result	Notes
1st place, gold medalist(s)	Flor Ruiz	Colombia	62.48	60.68	x	57.22	61.91	60.65	62.48	GR
2nd place, silver medalist(s)	Estefany Chacón	Venezuela	48.94	54.88	x	52.94	x	48.23	54.88	
3rd place, bronze medalist(s)	María Lucelly Murillo	Colombia	x	54.66	54.05	54.06	52.11	52.43	54.66	
4	Laura Paredes	Paraguay	48.21	49.20	52.68	50.07	52.09	48.58	52.68	
5	Rosmary Luján	Venezuela	46.02	48.83	48.76	x	52.30	48.54	52.30	
6	Nadia Requena	Peru	43.15	39.97	x	42.73	41.98	x	43.15	
7	Jimena Gómez	Peru	x	41.54	37.06	40.96	x	37.93	41.54	

=== Heptathlon ===
23–24 November

The highest mark recorded in each event is highlighted in yellow

Rank	Name	Nationality	100m H	HJ	SP	200m	LJ	JT	800m	Points	Notes
1st place, gold medalist(s)	Luisarys Toledo	Venezuela	14.35	1.67	12.73	24.93	6.03w	42.66	2:17.39	5785	NR
2nd place, silver medalist(s)	Martha Araújo	Colombia	14.04	1.61	11.92	25.64	6.16	47.21	2:22.26	5703	PB
3rd place, bronze medalist(s)	Joyce Micolta	Ecuador	14.96	1.76	11.55	27.10	5.58	40.51	2:33.96	5154	NU20R
4	Kimberley Cardoza	Peru	14.40	1.67	10.50	25.84	5.50	27.66	2:15.56	5141	
5	Javiera Brahm	Chile	14.56	1.61	11.68	27.02	5.69	27.90	2:25.97	5014	
6	Hercard García	Venezuela	15.04	1.64	11.27	27.02	5.46	38.99	2:48.72	4755	
