= Yilmar Herrera =

Colombian sprinter (born 1996)

Personal information
- Born: 29 April 1996 (age 29)

Sport
- Sport: Athletics
- Event: 400 metres
- Coached by: Raúl Díaz

Yilmar Andrés Herrera Madera (born 29 April 1996 in El Bagre) is a Colombian sprinter specialising in the 400 metres. He represented his country at the 2017 World Championships without qualifying for the semifinals. In addition, he won the bronze medal at the 2017 South American Championships.

His personal best in the event is 45.48 seconds set in Medellín in 2017.

Before taking up athletics he was a basketball player.

== International competitions ==
Year	Competition	Venue	Position	Event	Notes
Representing Colombia
2017	South American Championships	Asunción, Paraguay	3rd	400 m	46.02
2017	South American Championships	Asunción, Paraguay	1st	4 × 400 m relay	3:05.02
2017	World Championships	London, United Kingdom	44th (h)	400 m	47.18
2017	World Championships	London, United Kingdom	12th (h)	4 × 400 m relay	3:03.68
2017	Bolivarian Games	Santa Marta, Colombia	5th	400 m	47.49
2017	Bolivarian Games	Santa Marta, Colombia	1st	4 × 400 m relay	3:06.14
2018	South American Games	Cochabamba, Bolivia	2nd	400 m	45.64
2018	South American Games	Cochabamba, Bolivia	1st	4 × 400 m relay	3:04.78
2018	Central American and Caribbean Games	Barranquilla, Colombia	3rd	4 × 400 m relay	3:04.35
2019	World Relays	Yokohama, Japan	8th (B)	4 × 400 m relay	3:07.52
2019	South American Championships	Lima, Peru	5th	400 m	47.34
2019	South American Championships	Lima, Peru	3rd	4 × 100 m relay	39.94
2021	World Relays	Chorzów, Poland	6th	4 × 400 m relay	3:05.91
