= Leandro de Araújo =

Brazilian sprinter (born 1993)

Personal information
- Full name: Leandro Pitarelli de Araújo
- Nationality: Brazil
- Born: 22 February 1993 (age 33) Lucélia, São Paulo, Brazil

Sport
- Sport: Running
- Event: Sprints

Achievements and titles
- Personal best(s): 200 m: 21.10 (São Paulo 2012); 400 m: 47.03 (Maringa 2011)
Medal record
Men's athletics
Representing Brazil
South American Junior Championships
Gold medal – first place	2011 Medellín	4×400 m relay
World Youth Championships
Silver medal – second place	2009 Brixen	Medley relay
South American Youth Championships
Gold medal – first place	2010 Santiago	400 m
Bronze medal – third place	2008 Lima	200 m

Leandro Pitarelli de Araújo (born 22 February 1993) is a Brazilian sprinter.

== Career ==
He won the gold medal in the 400 metres at the 2010 South American Youth Championships in Athletics in Santiago, Chile. He also competed in the 400 metres at the 2010 Summer Youth Olympics, finishing fifth.

== Achievements ==
Year	Competition	Venue	Position	Event	Notes
Representing Brazil
2008	South American Youth Championships	Lima, Peru	3rd	200 m	22.47 s (wind: -0.4 m/s)
2010	South American Youth Championships	Santiago, Chile	1st	400 m	47.87 s
