= Paulo Sérgio Oliveira =

Brazilian athlete

Paulo Sergio dos Santos Oliveira
Personal information
- Born: 1 June 1993 (age 32) Buritama
- Height: 1.83 m (6 ft 0 in)
- Weight: 73 kg (161 lb)

Sport
- Sport: Athletics
- Event: Long jump
- Club: Adc São Bernardo do Campo
- Coached by: Luciana Alves

Paulo Sérgio dos Santos Oliveira (born 1 June 1993) is a Brazilian athlete specialising in the long jump. He represented his country at the 2017 World Championships without qualifying for the final. In addition, he won the gold medal at the 2017 South American Championships.

His personal best in the long jump are 8.13 metres (-1.2 m/s) set in São Paulo in 2014. He also has a best of 16.52 metres in the triple jump (-1.2 m/s) from 2016.

== International competitions ==
Year	Competition	Venue	Position	Event	Notes
Representing Brazil
2010	Youth Olympic Games	Singapore	5th	Triple jump	15.63 m
2010	South American Youth Championships	Santiago, Chile	2nd	Triple jump	15.13 m
2014	South American U23 Championships	Montevideo, Uruguay	2nd	Long jump	7.59 m
2017	South American Championships	Asunción, Paraguay	1st	Long jump	7.93 m (w)
2017	World Championships	London, United Kingdom	27th (q)	Long jump	7.53 m
2018	South American Games	Cochabamba, Bolivia	2nd	Long jump	8.12 m
2019	South American Championships	Lima, Peru	2nd	Long jump	7.71 m
