= 2016 Ibero-American Championships in Athletics =

XVII Ibero-American Championships in Athletics
- Dates: May 14–16
- Host city: Rio de Janeiro, Brazil
- Venue: Estádio Olímpico João Havelange
- Level: Senior
- Events: 44 (22 men, 22 women)
- Participation: 355 athletes from 28 nations

The 17th Ibero-American Championships in Athletics were held at the Estádio Olímpico João Havelange in Rio de Janeiro, Brazil, between May 14-16, 2016. Since the event served also as the athletics event test for the 2016 Summer Olympics, countries that do not compete at Ibero-American Championships attended the event, including United States, Saudi Arabia and Australia. However, medals won by those athletes did not count toward the total medal tally.

A total of 44 events were contested, 22 by men and 22 by women.

== Medal summary ==
=== Men ===
Event	Gold		Silver		Bronze	
100 metres (wind: +0.4 m/s)	Stanly del Carmen; Dominican Republic	10.27	Bruno de Barros; Brazil	10.28	Diego Palomeque; Colombia	10.30
200 metres (wind: +0.3 m/s)	Yancarlos Martínez; Dominican Republic	20.19	Bruno Hortelano; Spain	20.48	Bruno de Barros; Brazil	20.54
400 metres	Yoandys Lescay; Cuba	45.36	Luguelín Santos; Dominican Republic	45.58	Pedro Luiz de Oliveira; Brazil	45.64
800 metres	Lutimar Paes; Brazil	1:45.42	Kleberson Davide; Brazil	1:45.79	Lucirio Antonio Garrido; Venezuela	1:46.72
800 metres	Brandon Johnson of the United States, who competed as a guest, finished third in 1:46.12.					
1500 metres	Iván López; Chile	3:38.64	Carlos Díaz; Chile	3:39.20	Víctor Corrales; Spain	3:39.60
3000 metres	Iván López; Chile	7:52.53	Carlos Díaz; Chile	7:54.31	Éderson Pereira; Brazil	7:56.20
5000 metres	Altobeli da Silva; Brazil	13:53.48	Daniel Mateo; Spain	13:58.11	Nicolás Cuestas; Uruguay	13:58.60
3000 metres steeplechase	Altobeli da Silva; Brazil	8:33.72	Joaquin Arbe; Argentina	8:40.21	Ricardo Estremera; Puerto Rico	8:40.87
110 metres hurdles (wind: +0.7 m/s)	Javier McFarlane; Peru	13.55	Eduardo de Deus; Brazil	13.56	Jorge McFarlane; Peru	13.64
400 metres hurdles	Andrés Silva; Uruguay	49.48	Mikael de Jesus; Brazil	49.62	Mark Ujakpor; Spain	49.65
800 metres hurdles	Mikael de Jesus; Brazil	1.54.30	Jorge McFarlane; Peru	1.51.11	Andrés Silva; Uruguay	1.47.41
High jump	Eure Yáñez; Venezuela	2.26	Guilherme Cobbo; Brazil	2.23	Miguel Ángel Sancho; Spain	2.23
Pole vault	Germán Chiaraviglio; Argentina	5.60	Augusto de Oliveira; Brazil	5.30	Abel Curtinove; Brazil	5.20
Long jump	Emiliano Lasa; Uruguay	8.01 (+0.5)	Jean Marie Okutu; Spain	7.84 (+0.6)	Mauro Vinícius da Silva; Brazil	7.71 (+0.3)
Triple jump	Mateus de Sá; Brazil	16.40 (+1.3)	Jhon Murillo; Colombia	16.35 (–0.3)	Jean-Cassimiro Rosa; Brazil	16.23 (+0.8)
Shot put	Darlan Romani; Brazil	19.67	Marco Fortes; Portugal	19.05	Willian Dourado; Brazil	18.96
Discus throw	Ronald Julião; Brazil	59.56	Pedro José Cuesta; Spain	57.37	Carlos Valle; Brazil	54.81
Hammer throw	Wagner Domingos; Brazil	72.18	Roberto Sawyers; Costa Rica	72.15	Allan Wolski; Brazil	71.69
Javelin throw	Arley Ibargüen; Colombia	80.28	Dayron Márquez; Colombia	80.08	Júlio César de Oliveira; Brazil	79.02
Decathlon	Román Gastaldi; Argentina	7634	Alex Soares; Brazil	7330	Nicolas Nascimento; Brazil	7002
20,000 metres track walk	Caio Bonfim; Brazil*	1:26:40.7	Juan Manuel Cano; Argentina	1:27:27.7	José Alessandro Bagio; Brazil	1:28:02.1
4 x 100 metres relay	Dominican Republic; Mayobanex de Óleo; Yohandris Andújar; Stanly del Carmen; Yancarlos Martínez	38.52 NR	Brazil; Ailson Feitosa; Ricardo Souza; Bruno de Barros; Jorge Vides	38.65	Cuba; César Yuniel Ruiz; Roberto Skyers; Reynier Mena; Yaniel Carrero	38.93
4 x 400 metres relay	Colombia; Jhon Perlaza; Bernardo Baloyes; Carlos Lemos; Diego Palomeque	3:01.88 NR	Dominican Republic; Luis Charles; Yon Soriano; Andito Charles; Máximo Mercedes	3:03.43	Venezuela; Alberth Bravo; Omar Longart; Arturo Ramírez; Freddy Mezones	3:03.61

=== Women ===
Event	Gold		Silver		Bronze	
100 metres (wind: +0.6 m/s)	Rosângela Santos; Brazil*	11.24	Ángela Tenorio; Ecuador	11.29	Narcisa Landazuri; Ecuador	11.35
200 metres (wind: +0.2 m/s)	Nercelis Soto; Venezuela	22.95	Ángela Tenorio; Ecuador	23.13	Kauiza Venancio; Brazil	23.18
400 metres	Jailma Lima; Brazil	51.99	Carol Rodríguez; Puerto Rico	52.46	Letícia Souza; Brazil	52.79
800 metres	Rosibel García; Colombia	2:07.06	Lorena Sosa; Uruguay	2:08.00	Liliane Mariano; Brazil	2:08.03
1500 metres	Muriel Coneo; Colombia	4:09.35	Carolina Lozano; Argentina	4:11.71 NR	María Pía Fernández; Uruguay	4:12.61 NR
3000 metres	Juliana Paula dos Santos; Brazil	9:03.11	Muriel Coneo; Colombia	9:04.79 NR	Florencia Borelli; Argentina	9:10.79
5000 metres	Sara Moreira; Portugal	15:40.33	Florencia Borelli; Argentina	16:28.66	Jenifer Silva; Brazil	16:29.59
3000 metres steeplechase	Belén Casetta; Argentina	9:42.93 NR	Tatiane da Silva; Brazil	9:46.86	Zulema Arenas; Peru	9:56.04
100 metres hurdles (wind: –0.2 m/s)	Fabiana Moraes; Brazil	12.91	Maíla Machado; Brazil	12.99	Brigitte Merlano; Colombia	13.06
400 metres hurdles	Déborah Rodríguez; Uruguay	57.22	Gianna Woodruff; Panama	57.34	Liliane Fernandes; Brazil	58.42
High jump	Valdileia Martins; Brazil	1.84	Raquel Álvarez; Spain	1.84	Julia Cristina Silva; Brazil	1.75
High jump	Chaunté Lowe of the United States, who competed as a guest, won the competition in 1.96.					
Pole vault	Fabiana Murer; Brazil	4.60	Diamara Planell; Puerto Rico	4.30	Valeria Chiaraviglio; Argentina; Joana Costa; Brazil	4.10
Long jump	Eliane Martins; Brazil	6.52 (+0.2)	Keila Costa; Brazil*	6.43 (+0.3)	Jessica dos Reis; Brazil	6.31 (+0.4)
Triple jump	Keila Costa; Brazil*	14.01 (–0.2)	Núbia Soares; Brazil	14.00 (+0.1)	Yosiris Urrutia; Colombia	13.89(0.0)
Shot put	Ahymara Espinoza; Venezuela	18.19	Geisa Arcanjo; Brazil	17.92	Natalia Duco; Chile	17.45
Discus throw	Karen Gallardo; Chile	58.84	Fernanda Martins; Brazil	58.43	Rocío Comba; Argentina	56.75
Discus throw	Stephanie Trafton of the United States, who competed as a guest, won the competition in 61.22.					
Hammer throw	Jennifer Dahlgren; Argentina	65.87	Anna Pereira; Brazil	61.42	Mariana Marcelino; Brazil	60.91
Javelin throw	Flor Ruiz; Colombia	62.15	Laila Domingos; Brazil	60.44	Coralys Ortiz; Puerto Rico	58.31
Heptathlon	Alysbeth Félix; Puerto Rico	5910 NR	Evelis Aguilar; Colombia	5887	Ana Camila Pirelli; Paraguay	5748
10,000 metres track walk	Érica de Sena; Brazil	45:01.32	María Pérez; Spain	45:31.83	Daniela Cardoso; Portugal	46:03.44
4 x 100 metres relay	Puerto Rico; Beatriz Cruz; Celiangeli Morales; Genoiska Cancel; Carol Rodríguez	43.55	Brazil; Bruna Farias; Vanusa dos Santos; Kauiza Venancio; Gabriela Mourão	43.68	Venezuela; Andrea Purica; Nedian Vargas; Nelsibeth Villalobos; Nercelis Soto	43.94
4 x 400 metres relay	Brazil; Kamilla Miranda; Letícia Souza; Joelma Sousa; Jailma Lima	3:32.30	Spain; Geraxane Ussia; Indira Terrero; Barbara Camblor; Laura Bueno	3:36.16	Chile; Paula Goni; Viviana Olivares; Carmen Mansilla; María Fernanda Mackenna	3:42.47

== Medal table ==
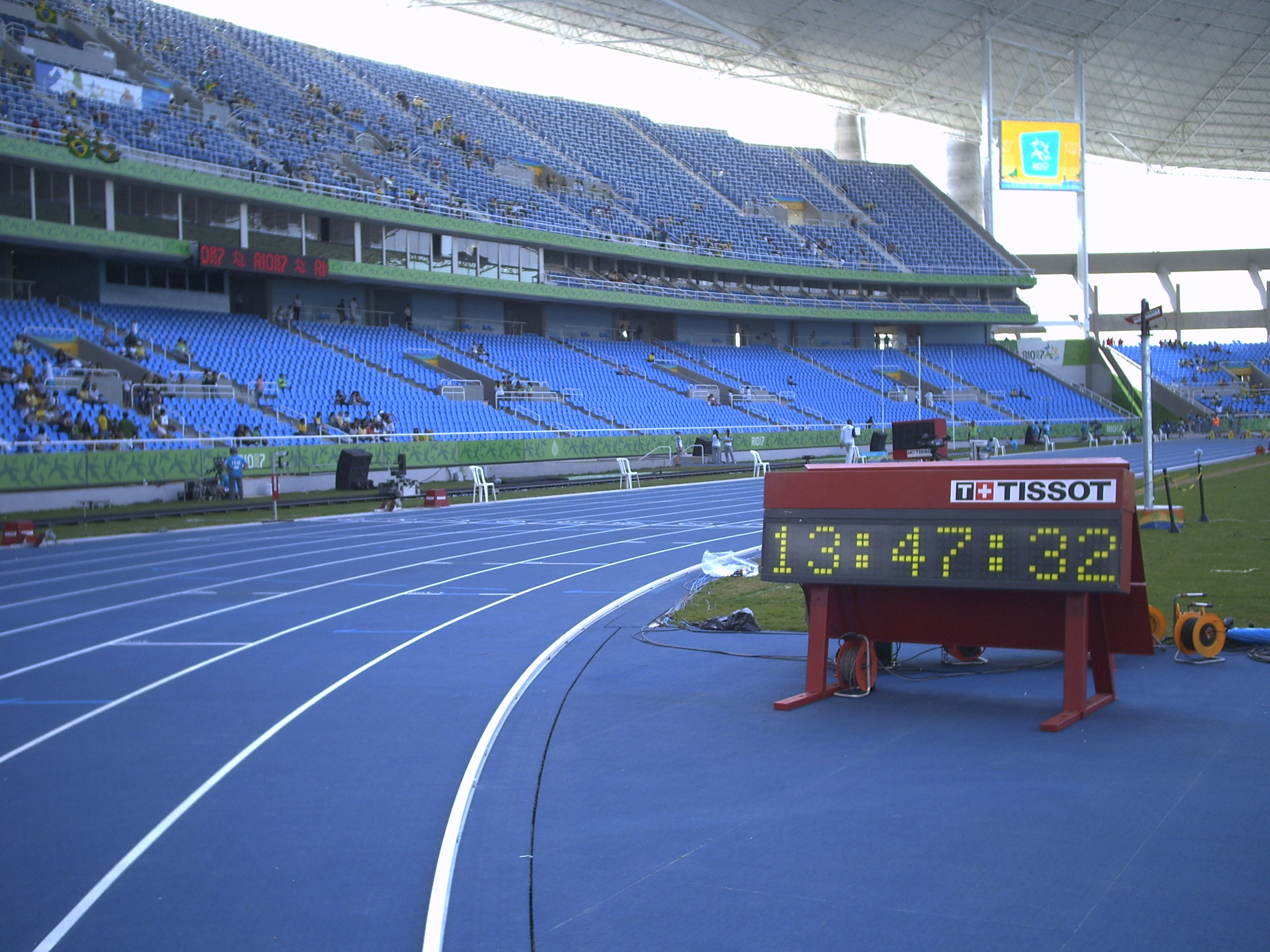
The host stadium (in 2007)

* Host nation (Brazil)

Rank	Nation	Gold	Silver	Bronze	Total
1	Brazil*	18	17	21	56
2	Colombia	5	4	3	12
3	Argentina	4	4	3	11
4	Chile	3	2	2	7
5	Dominican Republic	3	2	0	5
6	Uruguay	3	1	2	6
7	Venezuela	3	0	3	6
8	Puerto Rico	2	2	2	6
9	Portugal	1	1	1	3
10	Peru	1	0	2	3
11	Cuba	1	0	1	2
12	Spain	0	7	3	10
13	Ecuador	0	2	1	3
14	Costa Rica	0	1	0	1
14	Panama	0	1	0	1
16	Paraguay	0	0	1	1
Totals (16 entries)		44	44	45	133

== Participating nations ==
According to an unofficial count, 355 athletes from 28 countries participated, including five guest nations (*). Missing Ibero-American countries were Andorra, Equatorial Guinea, Mozambique, Nicaragua, and São Tomé and Príncipe.

- Angola (5)
- Argentina (21)
- Australia* (1)
- Bolivia (4)
- Brazil (89)
- Bulgaria* (1)
- Cape Verde (1)
- Chad* (1)
- Chile (33)
- Colombia (28)
- Costa Rica (4)
- Cuba (9)
- Dominican Republic (18)
- Ecuador (7)
- Guatemala (1)
- Guinea-Bissau (1)
- Honduras (5)
- Panama (3)
- Paraguay (10)
- Peru (19)
- Portugal (12)
- Puerto Rico (10)
- El Salvador (5)
- Saudi Arabia* (3)
- Spain (21)
- United States* (3)
- Uruguay (12)
- Venezuela (28)
