= Carlos Díaz (athlete) =

Chilean middle-distance runner (born 1993)

Personal information
- Full name: Carlos Martín Díaz del Río
- Born: 9 July 1993 (age 33) Santiago, Chile

Sport
- Country: Chile
- Sport: Athletics
- Event: 1500 metres – Marathon
Medal record
Pan American Games
Bronze medal – third place	2019 Lima	5000 m
South American Games
Gold medal – first place	2018 Cochabamba	1500 m
Gold medal – first place	2022 Asunción	10,000 m
South American Championships
Gold medal – first place	2015 Lima	1500 m
Gold medal – first place	2023 São Paulo	10,000 m
Silver medal – second place	2017 Luque	1500 m
Silver medal – second place	2021 Guayaquil	10,000 m
Ibero-American Championships
Bronze medal – third place	2012 Barquisimeto	1500 m
Bronze medal – third place	2014 São Paulo	1500 m
Bronze medal – third place	2026 Lima	1500 m
Bolivarian Games
Gold medal – first place	2022 Valledupar	5000 m
Silver medal – second place	2025 Ayacucho-Lima	10,000 m

Carlos Martín Díaz del Río (born 9 July 1993) is a Chilean middle and long-distance runner. He holds the Chilean national record for the indoor and outdoor 1500 metres, the indoor 3000 metres, the 10,000 metres, the half marathon and the marathon. He was the gold medallist in the event at the South American Championships in Athletics in 2015.

Díaz rose through the age categories, taking the South American Youth title in 2010, a South American Junior bronze in 2011, then a gold medal at the South American Under-23 Championships in Athletics in 2014. As a senior athlete he is a two-time medallist at the Ibero-American Championships in Athletics and won a bronze at the 2014 Pan American Sports Festival.

== Career ==
He came from a sporting background, as his mother Julia del Río had competed internationally for Chile at the IAAF World Cross Country Championships. He began to train in distance running with his mother as his coach from a young age. Díaz made his international debut at the 2008 South American Youth Championships in Athletics, where he was ninth. He represented his country at the global level the year after, running in the heats at the 2009 World Youth Championships in Athletics. He returned to continental level at the 2010 South American Youth Championships in Athletics and had his first success, taking the 1500 m gold on home turf in Santiago de Chile. Another youth level medal came at the 2010 South American Cross Country Championships, where his fourth-place finish led Chile to the team bronze medals. He began to make progress in the under-20 category at the 2011 South American Junior Championships in Athletics, taking a bronze as the youngest 1500 m medallist as well as fourth in the 800 m.

He began his 2012 with his first senior medal, taking bronze at the 2012 Ibero-American Championships in Athletics just ahead of his older compatriot Iván López. He became an under-20 global finalist at the 2012 World Junior Championships in Athletics, finishing seventh after a national junior record of 3:43.16 minutes in the qualifiers. He moved up another age category for the 2012 South American Under-23 Championships in Athletics and took the bronze medal, beaten this time by López, as well as Argentine Federico Bruno.

He failed to improve his personal best in 2013, but took a silver medal behind Leandro de Oliveira at the South American Road Mile Championships and was runner-up at the inaugural Chilean National Sports Games. Díaz returned to the track for Chile in 2014. First, he came close to a personal best at the South American Games in the Chilean capital but narrowly missed a medal behind Colombia's Rafith Rodríguez. After a personal best of 3:40.24 minutes in July, he scored two international bronze medals: first repeating his finish at the Ibero-American Championships, then coming third at the Pan American Sports Festival (Venezuela's Marvin Blanco won both times). In his last outing of the year he topped the podium at the South American Under-23 Championships with a championship record time of 3:44.52 minutes.

Díaz was an improved runner at the start of 2015 and set personal bests in the 1500 metres (3:40.15) and 3000 metres (7:56.34). He set a new best in the 10K run, defending his title in that section of the Santiago Marathon with a time of 28:45 minutes. At the age of twenty-one, Díaz established himself as one of the region's top middle-distance runners at the 2015 South American Championships in Athletics by securing his first senior gold in the 1500 m. – one of two winners for Chile at the meeting, alongside Víctor Aravena.

In 2018, Díaz made a move up in distance to the half marathon, and in his debut, he broke the Chilean record by almost 2 minutes with a time of 1:02:22.

== Personal bests ==
- 800 metres – 1:50.23 (Majadahonda 2016)
- 1500 metres – 3:37.82 (Huelva 2016) NR
  - Indoors – 3:42.23i (Sabadell 2016) NR
- 3000 metres – 7:51.30i (Valencia 2022) NR
- 5000 metres – 13:31.48 (Heusden-Zolder 2023)
- 10,000 metres – 27:58.97 (London 2023) NR
- 10K run (road) – 28:07 (Laredo 2022)
- Half marathon – 1:01:32 (Gdynia 2020) NR
- Marathon – 2:08:04 (Sevilla 2024) NR

== International competitions ==
Year	Competition	Venue	Position	Event	Notes
2008	South American Youth Championships	Lima, Peru	9th	1500 m	4:09.73
2009	World Youth Championships	Bressanone, Italy	11th (q)	1500 m	4:02.31
2010	South American Cross Country Championships	Guayaquil, Ecuador	4th	Youth race	12:09.7
2010	South American Cross Country Championships	Guayaquil, Ecuador	3rd	Youth team	13 pts
2010	South American Youth Championships	Santiago, Chile	1st	1500 m	4:12.11
2011	South American Junior Championships	Medellín, Colombia	4th	800 m	1:50.92
2011	South American Junior Championships	Medellín, Colombia	3rd	1500 m	3:54.41
2012	Ibero-American Championships	Barquisimeto, Venezuela	3rd	1500 m	3:48.50
2012	World Junior Championships	Barcelona, Spain	7th	1500 m	3:44.02
2012	South American Under-23 Championships	São Paulo, Brazil	3rd	1500 m	3:50.01
2013	South American Road Mile Championships	Belém, Brazil	2nd	Mile run	4:05
2014	South American Games	Santiago, Chile	4th	1500 m	3:43.22
2014	Ibero-American Championships	São Paulo, Brazil	3rd	1500 m	3:44.74
2014	Pan American Sports Festival	Mexico City. Mexico	3rd	1500 m	3:49.20
2014	South American Under-23 Championships	Montevideo, Uruguay	1st	1500 m	3:44.52
2015	South American Championships	Lima, Peru	1st	1500 m	3:40.79
2015	World Championships	Beijing, China	24th (sf)	1500 m	3:47.48
2016	Ibero-American Championships	Rio de Janeiro, Brazil	2nd	1500 m	3:39.20
2016	Ibero-American Championships	Rio de Janeiro, Brazil	2nd	3000 m	7:54.31
2017	South American Championships	Asunción, Paraguay	2nd	1500 m	3:45.69
2017	Bolivarian Games	Santa Marta, Colombia	1st	1500 m	3:45.58
2017	Bolivarian Games	Santa Marta, Colombia	1st	5000 m	14:02.92
2018	South American Games	Cochabamba, Bolivia	1st	1500 m	3:50.82
2019	Pan American Games	Lima, Peru	12th	1500 m	3:49.33
2019	Pan American Games	Lima, Peru	3rd	5000 m	13:54.43
2019	Pan American Games	Lima, Peru	–	10,000 m	DNF
2021	South American Championships	Guayaquil, Ecuador	2nd	5000 m	13:52.63
2022	Ibero-American Championships	La Nucía, Spain	2nd	5000 m	13:51.97
2022	Bolivarian Games	Valledupar, Colombia	1st	5000 m	14:34.59
2022	Bolivarian Games	Valledupar, Colombia	4th	10,000 m	30:03.46
2022	South American Games	Asunción, Paraguay	1st	10,000 m	29:15.66
2023	South American Championships	São Paulo, Brazil	1st	10,000 m	28:57.18
2023	World Championships	Budapest, Hungary	–	10,000 m	DNF
2023	Pan American Games	Santiago, Chile	4th	10,000 m	29:22.54
2026	Ibero-American Championships	Lima, Peru	3rd	10,000 m	28:36.98
