= Eure Yáñez =

Venezuelan high jumper

Personal information
- Full name: Eure Javier Yáñez Ruiz
- Born: 20 June 1993 (age 33) Barlovento, Miranda, Venezuela
- Height: 1.83 m (6 ft 0 in)
- Weight: 68 kg (150 lb)

Sport
- Country: Venezuela
- Sport: Athletics
- Event: High jump
- Updated on 23 December 2014

Eure Javier Yánez Ruiz (born 20 June 1993) is a Venezuelan athlete specialising in the high jump.

His personal best in the event is 2.31 metres, set in Asunción in 2017. This is the current national record.

== Personal bests ==
- High jump: 2.31 m – Asunción, Paraguay, 23 June 2017
- Triple jump: 15.63 m (wind: +1.5 m/s) – San Felipe, Venezuela, 30 August 2014

== Competition record ==
Year	Competition	Venue	Position	Notes
Representing Venezuela
2010	South American Youth Championships	Santiago, Chile	3rd	1.94 m
2011	ALBA Games	Barquisimeto, Venezuela	5th	2.11 m
2011	South American Junior Championships	Medellín, Colombia	2nd	2.07 m
2012	Ibero-American Championships	Barquisimeto, Venezuela	9th	2.11 m
2012	World Junior Championships	Barcelona, Spain	15th (h)	2.14 m
2012	South American U-23 Championships	São Paulo, Brazil	4th	2.16 m
2013	South American Championships	Cartagena, Colombia	4th	2.19 m
2013	Bolivarian Games	Trujillo, Peru	3rd	2.16 m
2014	South American Games	Santiago, Chile	1st	2.21 m
2014	Pan American Sports Festival	Mexico City, Mexico	5th	2.20 m A
2014	South American U-23 Championships	Montevideo, Uruguay	2nd	2.18 m
2014	Central American and Caribbean Games	Xalapa, Mexico	2nd	2.24 m A
2015	South American Championships	Lima, Peru	4th	2.13 m
2015	Pan American Games	Toronto, Canada	10th	2.15 m
2016	Ibero-American Championships	Rio de Janeiro, Brazil	1st	2.26 m
2017	South American Championships	Asunción, Paraguay	1st	2.31 m
2017	World Championships	London, United Kingdom	19th (q)	2.26 m
2017	Bolivarian Games	Santa Marta, Colombia	1st	2.24 m
2018	South American Games	Cochabamba, Bolivia	1st	2.28 m
2018	Central American and Caribbean Games	Barranquilla, Colombia	2nd	2.28 m
2019	South American Championships	Lima, Peru	3rd	2.18 m
2019	Pan American Games	Lima, Peru	7th	2.21 m
2020	South American Indoor Championships	Cochabamba, Bolivia	2nd	2.22 m
2021	South American Championships	Guayaquil, Ecuador	4th	2.17 m
