= Jhon Castañeda =

Colombian racewalker (born 1992)

Jhon Alexander Castañeda
Personal information
- Full name: Jhon Alexander Castañeda Ángulo
- Nationality: Colombian
- Born: 19 February 1992 (age 34) Bogotá, Colombia

Sport
- Sport: Athletics
- Event: Race walking
Medal record
Representing Colombia
Men's athletics
Event	1st	2nd	3rd
World Team Championships (U20)	0	0	1
Pan American Cup	0	1	0
South American Championships	1	2	0
South American Race Walking Championships	1	0	1
Pan American Cup (U20)	1	0	0
South American U20 Championships	0	0	1
Total	3	3	3
Pan American Cup
Silver medal – second place	2015 Arica	20 km walk (team)
South American Championships
Gold medal – first place	2019 Lima	20,000 m walk
Silver medal – second place	2017 Asunción	20,000 m walk
Silver medal – second place	2021 Guayaquil	20,000 m walk
South American Race Walking Championships
Gold medal – first place	2008 Cuenca	10 km walk (U18)
Bronze medal – third place	2016 Guayaquil	20 km walk
World Team Championships (U20)
Bronze medal – third place	2010 Chihuahua	10 km walk (team)
Pan American Cup (U20)
Gold medal – first place	2011 Envigado	10 km walk (team)
South American U20 Championships
Bronze medal – third place	2009 São Paulo/Port of Spain	10,000 m walk

Jhon Alexander Castañeda Ángulo (Note: In this Spanish name, the first or paternal surname is Castañeda and the second or maternal family name is Ángulo.) (born 19 February 1992) is a Colombian race walking athlete. He represented Colombia at the 2020 Summer Olympics in the men's 20 kilometres walk.

== Career ==
On 11 May 2011, Castañeda set the South American under-20 record in the 5000 metres race walk.

In February 2014, Castañeda represented Colombia at the 2014 South American Race Walking Championships and did not finish. He represented Colombia at the 2015 Pan American Race Walking Cup in May 2015 and finished in 18th place.

In June 2017, Castañeda represented Colombia at the 2017 South American Championships in the 20,000 meter walk and won a silver medal. In June 2018, he represented Colombia at the 2018 South American Games in the 20 kilometers walk and finished in fourth place.

In May 2019, Castañeda represented Colombia at the 2019 South American Championships in the 20,000 meter walk and won a gold medal. In October 2019, he represented Colombia at the 2019 World Athletics Championships in the men's 20 kilometres walk and was disqualified.

He again represented Colombia at the 2021 South American Championships in May 2021 and won a silver medal. He represented Colombia at the 2020 Summer Olympics in the men's 20 kilometres walk and finished in 27th place.
