= Athletics at the 2023 Pan American Games – Men's 4 × 400 metres relay =

Men's 4 × 400 metres relay at the 2023 Pan American Games
- Venue: Julio Martínez National Stadium
- Dates: November 4
- Competitors: 32 from 8 nations
- Winning time: 3:03.92

Medalists
Gold medal	Lucas Carvalho; Matheus Lima; Douglas Mendes; Lucas Vilar	Brazil
Silver medal	Guillermo Campos; Luis Avilés; Edgar Ramírez; Valente Mendoza	Mexico
Bronze medal	Ezequiel Suárez; Robert King; Ferdy Agramonte; Yeral Nuñez	Dominican Republic

The men's 4 × 400 metres relay competition of the athletics events at the 2023 Pan American Games took place on November 4 at the Julio Martínez National Stadium of Santiago, Chile.

== Records ==
Prior to this competition, the existing world and Pan American Games records were as follows:

World record	United States	2.54.29	Stuttgart, Germany	August 22, 1993
Pan American Games record	Jamaica	2.57.97	Winnipeg, Canada	July 30, 1999

== Schedule ==
Date	Time	Round
November 4, 2023	20:48	Final

== Results ==
=== Final ===
The results were as follows

Rank	Lane	Nation	Name	Time	Notes
1st place, gold medalist(s)	5	Brazil	Lucas Carvalho; Matheus Lima; Douglas Mendes; Lucas Vilar	3:03.92	SB
2nd place, silver medalist(s)	8	Mexico	Guillermo Campos; Luis Avilés; Edgar Ramírez; Valente Mendoza	3:04.22	SB
3rd place, bronze medalist(s)	6	Dominican Republic	Ezequiel Suárez; Robert King; Ferdy Agramonte; Yeral Nuñez	3:05.98	
4	4	Venezuela	Julio Rodríguez; Javier Gómez; Kelvis Padrino; José Antonio Maita	3:06.04	
5	7	United States	Evan Miller; Derek Holdsworth; Christopher Royster; Richard Kuykendoll	3:08.67	
6	2	Ecuador	Francisco Tejeda; Anderson Marquinez; Lenin Sánchez; Alan Minda	3:09.33	
7	1	Chile	Cristóbal Muñoz; Martín Kouyoumdjian; Sergio Germain; Martín Zabala	3:12.40	
8	3	Argentina	Pedro Emmert; Leandro Paris; Diego Lacamoire; Elián Larregina	3:15.69	
