= Jéssica Carolina dos Reis =

Brazilian long jumper

Personal information
- Born: 17 March 1993 (age 32)

Sport
- Sport: Athletics
- Event: Long jump

Jéssica Carolina Alves dos Reis (born 17 March 1993) is a Brazilian athlete specialising in the long jump. She has won multiple medals on regional level.

Her personal bests in the event are 6.66 metres outdoors (+1.2 m/s, São Paulo 2014) and 6.44 metres indoors (Eaubonne 2016).

== International competitions ==
Year	Competition	Venue	Position	Event	Notes
Representing Brazil
2010	Youth Olympic Games	Singapore	6th	100 m	11.94 s
2010	South American Youth Championships	Santiago, Chile	2nd	100 m	12.00 s
2010	South American Youth Championships	Santiago, Chile	1st	Medley relay	2:11.98
2010	South American Youth Championships	Santiago, Chile	1st	Long jump	6.01 m
2011	Pan American Junior Championships	Miramar, United States	1st	Long jump	6.39 m
2011	South American Junior Championships	Medellín, Colombia	3rd	100 m	11.72 s
2011	South American Junior Championships	Medellín, Colombia	1st	4 × 100 m relay	44.64 s
2011	South American Junior Championships	Medellín, Colombia	1st	Long jump	6.38 m
2012	World Junior Championships	Barcelona, Spain	3rd	4 × 100 m relay	44.29 s
2012	World Junior Championships	Barcelona, Spain	6th	Long jump	6.51 m
2012	South American U23 Championships	São Paulo, Brazil	1st	Long jump	6.18 m
2013	South American Championships	Cartagena, Colombia	3rd	Long jump	6.49 m (w)
2014	South American Games	Santiago, Chile	2nd	Long jump	6.32 m
2014	South American U23 Championships	Montevideo, Uruguay	2nd	Long jump	6.35 m
2016	Ibero-American Championships	Rio de Janeiro, Brazil	3rd	Long jump	6.31 m
2017	South American Championships	Asunción, Paraguay	4th	Long jump	6.43 m (w)
2018	South American Games	Cochabamba, Bolivia	4th	Long jump	6.56 m
