= 2017 South American Championships in Athletics =

50th South American Championships
- Official logo
- Dates: 23–25 June
- Host city: Luque, Asunción, Paraguay
- Venue: Pista Comité Olímpico Paraguayo
- Level: Senior
- Events: 44 (22 men, 22 women)
- Participation: 357 athletes from 13 nations
- Records set: 8

2017 South American Championships in Athletics was the 50th edition of the biennial athletics competition between South American nations. The event was held in Luque, near Asunción, Paraguay, from 23 to 25 June at the Pista Comité Olímpico Paraguayo. It was the first time this competition was held in that country.

== Medal summary ==
=== Men ===
Event	Gold		Silver		Bronze	
100 metres (wind: +1.9 m/s)	Diego Palomeque (COL)	10.11 NR	Bruno de Barros (BRA)	10.22 SB	Felipe Bardi dos Santos (BRA)	10.29
200 metres (wind: +2.2 m/s)	Bernardo Baloyes (COL)	20.36	Álvaro Cassiani (VEN)	20.90	Virjilio Griggs (PAN)	21.11
400 metres	Winston George (GUY)	45.42 SB	Jhon Perlaza (COL)	45.77	Yilmar Herrera (COL)	46.02
800 metres	Leandro Paris (ARG)	1:49.82	Lutimar Paes (BRA)	1:50.27	Jonathan Bolados (CHI)	1:50.30
1500 metres	Federico Bruno (ARG)	3:45.28	Carlos Díaz (CHI)	3:45.69	Carlos San Martín (COL)	3:49.99
5000 metres	Víctor Aravena (CHI)	13:57.45	Ederson Pereira (BRA)	13:59.20	Iván Darío González (COL)	14:15.76
10,000 metres	Bayron Piedra (ECU)	29:03.73 SB	Luis Ostos (PER)	29:06.74	Miguel Amador (COL)	29:35.17
110 metres hurdles (wind: +3.8 m/s)	Eduardo de Deus (BRA)	13.42	Éder Souza (BRA)	13.49	Javier McFarlane (PER)	13.76
400 metres hurdles	Guillermo Ruggeri (ARG)	49.72 NR	Alberth Bravo (VEN)	50.36	Alfredo Sepúlveda (CHI)	50.37
3000 m steeplechase	José Peña (VEN)	8:45.93	Gerard Giraldo (COL)	8:51.59	Mario Bazán (PER)	8:51.97
4 × 100 metres relay	Brazil; Flávio Barbosa; Aldemir da Silva Júnior; Bruno de Barros; Felipe Bardi dos Santos	39.47	Colombia; Deivy Díaz; Diego Palomeque; Bernardo Baloyes; Jhonny Rentería	39.67	Venezuela; Yeiker Mendoza; Arturo Ramírez; Álvaro Cassiani; Jesús Rafael Vázquez	39.74
4 × 400 metres relay	Colombia; Jhon Solís; Diego Palomeque; Yilmar Herrera; Jhon Perlaza	3:05.02	Brazil; Bruno de Barros; Alexander Russo; Hugo de Sousa; Lucas Carvalho	3:07.32	Venezuela; Alberth Bravo; Alberto Aguilar; Kelvis Padrino; Omar Longart	3:07.74
20,000 m track walk	Mauricio Arteaga (ECU)	1:24:40.00	Jhon Castañeda (COL)	1:25:04.50	César Rodríguez (PER)	1:25:58.30
High jump	Eure Yáñez (VEN)	2.31 CR, NR	Talles Frederico Silva (BRA)	2.28	Fernando Ferreira (BRA)	2.19
Pole vault	Germán Chiaraviglio (ARG)	5.60	Walter Viáfara (COL)	5.10	Rubén Benítez (ARG)	5.00
Long jump	Paulo Sérgio Oliveira (BRA)	7.93 (+2.3 m/s)	Emiliano Lasa (URU)	7.89 (+1.7 m/s)	Daniel Pineda (CHI)	7.87 (+3.3 m/s)
Triple jump	Miguel van Assen (SUR)	16.94 (+2.0 m/s) NR	Mateus de Sá (BRA)	16.70 (+3.9 m/s)	Eduardo Landeta (ECU)	16.30 (+4.3 m/s)
Shot put	Darlan Romani (BRA)	21.02 CR	Willian Dourado (BRA)	19.95	Germán Lauro (ARG)	19.91
Discus throw	Mauricio Ortega (COL)	63.82 CR, SB	Germán Lauro (ARG)	61.70 SB	Douglas dos Reis (BRA)	58.83
Hammer throw	Wagner Domingos (BRA)	73.79	Humberto Mansilla (CHI)	73.16	Allan Wolski (BRA)	71.38
Javelin throw	Braian Toledo (ARG)	79.93	Arley Ibargüen (COL)	75.97	Víctor Fatecha (PAR)	74.57
Decathlon	Jefferson Santos (BRA)	8,187 w PB	Georni Jaramillo (VEN)	8,126 w PB	José Lemos (COL)	7,572 PB
WR world record | AR area record | CR championship record | GR games record | NR national record | OR Olympic record | PB personal best | SB season best | WL world leading (in a given season)

=== Women ===
Event	Gold		Silver		Bronze	
100 metres (wind: +3.4 m/s)	Ángela Tenorio (ECU)	11.02	Ana Cláudia Lemos (BRA)	11.12	Andrea Purica (VEN)	11.18
200 metres (wind: +2.8 m/s)	Vitória Cristina Rosa (BRA)	22.67	Ángela Tenorio (ECU)	22.90	Nediam Vargas (VEN)	22.95
400 metres	Geisa Coutinho (BRA)	52.03	Jennifer Padilla (COL)	52.68 SB	Maitte Torres (PER)	53.99
800 metres	Johana Arrieta (COL)	2:06.36	Andrea Calderón (ECU)	2:07.25	Déborah Rodríguez (URU)	2:07.41
1500 metres	Muriel Coneo (COL)	4:16.46	Rosibel García (COL)	4:21.81 SB	Zulema Arenas (PER)	4:23.37 SB
5000 metres	Muriel Coneo (COL)	16:16.64	Belén Casetta (ARG)	16:26.32	Ángela Figueroa (COL)	16:30.59
10,000 metres	Carmen Martínez (PAR)	34:08.28 SB	Clara Canchanya (PER)	35:01.47 PB	Jovana de la Cruz (PER)	35:06.24
100 metres hurdles (wind: +2.9 m/s)	Fabiana Moraes (BRA)	12.86	Génesis Romero (VEN)	13.16	Melissa Gonzalez (COL)	13.42
400 metres hurdles	Gianna Woodruff (PAN)	56.04 CR	Melissa Gonzalez (COL)	56.29	Fiorella Chiappe (ARG)	57.02 PB
3000 m steeplechase	Belén Casetta (ARG)	9:51.40 CR	Zulema Arenas (PER)	10:09.20	Tatiane Raquel da Silva (BRA)	10:34.23
4 × 100 metres relay	Brazil; Franciela Krasucki; Ana Cláudia Lemos; Vitória Cristina Rosa; Rosângela Santos	43.12 CR	Colombia; Maderleis Alcazar; Jennifer Padilla; Darlenys Obregón; Eliecith Palacios	44.50	Ecuador; Juliana Angulo; Narcisa Landazuri; Romina Cifuentes; Ángela Tenorio	44.53
4 × 400 metres relay	Brazil; Jailma de Lima; Jéssica da Silva; Jéssica dos Santos; Geisa Coutinho	3:33.00	Colombia; Eliana Chávez; Rosangélica Escobar; Astrid Balanta; Jennifer Padilla	3:33.92	Chile; Martina Weil; Carmen Mansilla; María Fernanda Mackenna; María José Echeverría	3:40.00
20,000 m track walk	Paola Pérez (ECU)	1:32:26.0h WL, NR	Ángela Castro (BOL)	1:32:35.2h NR	Johana Ordóñez (ECU)	1:38:13.3h SB
High jump	María Fernanda Murillo (COL)	1.82	Lorena Aires (URU)	1.82 NR	Julia dos Santos (BRA)	1.79
Pole vault	Robeilys Peinado (VEN)	4.50	Joana Costa (BRA)	4.20	Valeria Chiaraviglio (ARG)	4.15 SB
Long jump	Eliane Martins (BRA)	6.51 (+3.9 m/s)	Macarena Reyes (CHI)	6.51 (+7.3 m/s)	Jhoanmy Luque (VEN)	6.47 (+4.9 m/s)
Triple jump	Núbia Soares (BRA)	14.42 (+4.2 m/s)	Yulimar Rojas (VEN)	14.36 (+1.4 m/s)	Yosiris Urrutia (COL)	13.64 (+2.7 m/s)
Shot put	Geisa Arcanjo (BRA)	18.06	Sandra Lemos (COL)	17.30	Livia Avancini (BRA)	16.75
Discus throw	Andressa de Morais (BRA)	64.68 CR, AR	Fernanda Martins (BRA)	60.80	Karen Gallardo (CHI)	59.73
Hammer throw	Mariana Marcelino (BRA)	66.83	Jennifer Dahlgren (ARG)	66.17	Johana Moreno (COL)	63.09
Javelin throw	Flor Ruiz (COL)	61.91 CR	Laila Domingos (BRA)	58.50	Laura Paredes (PAR)	54.86 PB
Heptathlon	Tamara de Sousa (BRA)	5,667	Javiera Brahm (CHI)	5,168	Martina Corra (ARG)	5,026
WR world record | AR area record | CR championship record | GR games record | NR national record | OR Olympic record | PB personal best | SB season best | WL world leading (in a given season)

== Medal table ==
The host country is highlighted in lavender blue

Rank	Nation	Gold	Silver	Bronze	Total
1	Brazil	17	12	7	36
2	Colombia	9	12	9	30
3	Argentina	6	3	5	14
4	Ecuador	4	2	3	9
5	Venezuela	3	5	5	13
6	Chile	1	4	5	10
7	Paraguay*	1	0	2	3
8	Panama	1	0	1	2
9	Guyana	1	0	0	1
9	Suriname	1	0	0	1
11	Peru	0	3	6	9
12	Uruguay	0	2	1	3
13	Bolivia	0	1	0	1
Totals (13 entries)		44	44	44	132

== Points table ==
Rank	Nation	Total	Men	Women
1	Brazil	352	164	188
2	Colombia	259	134	125
3	Argentina	160	97	63
4	Venezuela	125	74	51
5	Chile	100	56	44
6	Ecuador	100	39	61
7	Peru	62	27	35
8	Uruguay	34	15	19
9	Paraguay	28	9	19
10	Panama	18	5	13
11	Bolivia	18	7	11
12	Guyana	15	10	5
13	Suriname	12	11	1

== Participation ==
All 13 member federations of CONSUDATLE participated at the championships.

- Argentina (41)
- Bolivia (18)
- Brazil (52)
- Chile (41)
- Colombia (43)
- Ecuador (42)
- Guyana (3)
- Panama (4)
- Paraguay (39)
- Peru (24)
- Suriname (5)
- Uruguay (15)
- Venezuela (30)

== See also ==
- 2017 South American U20 Championships in Athletics
- 2017 Asian Athletics Championships
- 2017 World Championships in Athletics
