= 2011 South American Junior Championships in Athletics =

XXXIX South American Junior Championships in Athletics
- Dates: September 23–25
- Host city: Medellín, Colombia
- Venue: Estadio Alfonso Galvis Duque
- Level: Junior
- Events: 44
- Participation: about 271 athletes from 13 nations

The 39th South American Junior Championships in Athletics were held in Medellín, Colombia in the Estadio Alfonso Galvis Duque from September 23–25, 2011. A detailed report on the results was given.

== Participation (unofficial) ==
Detailed result lists can be found on the CBAt website, and on the "World Junior Athletics History" website. An unofficial count yields the number of about 271 athletes from about 13 countries: Argentina (30), Bolivia (10), Brazil (75), Chile (26), Colombia (61), Ecuador (23), Guyana (1), Panama (7), Paraguay (6), Peru (11), Suriname (3), Uruguay (6), Venezuela (12).

== Medal summary ==
Medal winners are published Complete results can be found on the CBAt, and on the "World Junior Athletics History" website.

=== Men ===
Event	Gold		Silver		Bronze	
100 metres (0.0 m/s)	Aldemir Junior (BRA)	10.36	Diego Palomeque (COL)	10.45	Mateo Edward (PAN)	10.47
200 metres (0.0 m/s)	Aldemir Junior (BRA); Diego Palomeque (COL)	20.94			Stiven Valoyes (COL)	21.39
400 metres	Anderson Henriques (BRA)	46.59	Bernardo Baloyes (COL)	47.05	Stephan James (GUY)	47.79
800 metres	Joseilton Cunha (BRA)	1:49.32	Maicon dos Santos (BRA)	1:49.55	Miguel Alvarado (COL)	1:50.20
1500 metres	Federico Bruno (ARG)	3:53.04	Lucirio Antonio Garrido (VEN)	3:53.10	Carlos Díaz (CHI)	3:54.41
5000 metres	Miguel Amador (COL)	14:40.81	Yamid Naranho (COL)	14:44.81	Gustavo Frencia (ARG)	15:09.49
10,000 metres	Miguel Amador (COL)	30:54.90	João Prado Filho (BRA)	31:22.64	Mauricio Matute (ECU)	31:37.89
3000 metres steeplechase	Mauricio Matute (ECU)	9:22.94	Alex de Oliveira (BRA)	9:31.31	Nelson Blanco (COL)	9:41.38
110 metres hurdles (0.0 m/s)	João Vítor de Oliveira (BRA)	13.85	Lucas Carvalho (BRA)	13.92	Cristian Alzate (COL)	13.94
400 metres hurdles	João Vítor de Oliveira (BRA)	52.62	Renato Izidio (BRA)	53.40	Jefferson Valencia (COL)	53.95
High jump	Rebert Firmiano (BRA)	2.07	Eure Yánez (VEN)	2.07	Cristóbal Hurtado (CHI)	2.04
Pole vault	Heberth Gómez (COL)	5.00	Thiago Braz da Silva (BRA)	4.85	Matheus da Silva (BRA)	4.80
Long jump	Douglas Selestrino (BRA)	7.57 (0.0 m/s)	Daiber Cambindo (COL)	7.49	Erick Zambrano (ECU)	7.45
Triple jump	José Adrian Sornoza (ECU)	15.82 (-1.2 m/s)	Henrique da Silva (BRA)	15.72	Kauam Bento (BRA)	15.69
Shot put	Joaquín Ballivián (CHI)	19.31	William Braido (BRA)	18.42	John Zea (COL)	16.85
Discus throw	Mauricio Ortega (COL)	58.48	Felipe Lorenzon (BRA)	54.23	Juan Ignacio Solito (ARG)	53.42
Hammer throw	Jonatan Gras (ARG)	67.36	Thiago da Silva (BRA)	61.60	Fabián Serna (COL)	61.31
Javelin throw	Braian Toledo (ARG)	74.04 CR	Tomás Guerra (CHI)	70.99	Reynan Costa (BRA)	68.67
Decathlon	Victor Santos (BRA)	7173 CR	Oscar Campos (VEN)	6914	Guillermo Ruggieri (ARG)	6880
10000 metres Walk	Éider Arévalo (COL)	39:56.01 CR, AU20R	José Leonardo Montaña (COL)	42:16.57	Marco Antonio Rodríguez (BOL)	44:56.76
4 × 100 metres relay	Brazil; Aldemir Junior; Flavio Barbosa; Jackson da Silva; Rodrigo Rocha	39.63 CR, AU20R	Colombia; Stiven Valoyes; Diego Palomeque; Bernardo Baloyes; Fredy Cuero	40.08	Argentina; Sebastián Acevedo; Rodrigo Sánchez; Facundo Andrada; Leandro Monje	41.89
4 × 400 metres relay	Brazil; Pedro de Oliveira; Leandro de Araújo; Maicon dos Santos; Anderson Henriques	3:08.35 CR	Colombia; Bernardo Baloyes; German Ardila; Diego Palomeque; Jhon Solís	3:08.71	Chile; Felipe Osorio; Alejandro Peirano; Sergio Germaín; Joan Pinto	3:18.69

=== Women ===
Event	Gold		Silver		Bronze	
100 metres (0.0 m/s)	Tamiris de Liz (BRA)	11.43	Merlin Palacios (COL)	11.64	Jessica dos Reis (BRA)	11.72
200 metres (0.0 m/s)	Tamiris de Liz (BRA)	23.35 CR, AU20R, NU20R	Merlin Palacios (COL)	23.69	Beatriz de Souza (BRA)	24.16
400 metres	Ana Da Silva (BRA)	53.84	Evelis Aguilar (COL)	54.45	Rosa Escobar (COL)	54.70
800 metres	Ana Da Silva (BRA)	2:05.76 CR	Rosa Escobar (COL)	2:06.87	Ana Funes (ARG)	2:08.71
1500 metres	Érika Lima (BRA)	4:36.10	Ana Funes (ARG)	4:36.63	Ana Pacheco (BRA)	4:37.83
3000 metres	Charo Inga (PER)	9:55.01	Areli Aparicio (PER)	10:01.08	Adriana da Luz (BRA)	10:08.94
5000 metres	Charo Inga (PER)	17:13.88	Luz Mery Rojas (PER)	17:16.70	Martha Cadena (COL)	19:00.84
3000 metres steeplechase	Luz Mery Rojas (PER)	10:53.59	Zulema Arenas (PER)	11:05.23	Blenda Yanez (ECU)	11:14.27
100 metres hurdles (-0.5 m/s)	Daniela Castillo (ECU)	14.17	Natalia Pinzón (COL)	14.46	Ursulla da Silva (BRA)	14.65
400 metres hurdles	Déborah Rodríguez (URU)	60.60	Debora dos Santos (BRA)	61.38	Karen Palomeque (COL)	62.84
High jump	Yulimar Rojas (VEN)	1.78	Nulfa Palacios (COL)	1.71	Angie García (COL)	1.68
Pole vault	Angie Hernández (COL)	3.70	Victoria Fernández (CHI)	3.50	Andrea Conde (COL)	3.35
Long jump	Jessica dos Reis (BRA)	6.38 (0.0 m/s)	Andressa Fidelis (BRA)	5.84	Lorayne Orozco (COL)	5.79
Triple jump	Giselly Landázury (COL)	13.39 (1.2 m/s)	Yudelsy González (VEN)	13.01	Gabriela De Lima (BRA)	12.57
Shot put	Livia Avancini (BRA)	14.75	Alessandra Gamboa (PER)	14.60	Esthefania da Costa (BRA)	13.85
Discus throw	Esthefania da Costa (BRA)	48.97	Lidiane Cansian (BRA)	47.94	Helena Galvan (COL)	44.96
Hammer throw	Daniela Gómez (ARG)	54.49	Kerolayne da Silva (BRA)	51.91	Tatiana Martínez (COL)	50.45
Javelin throw	Emylyr da Conceiçâo (BRA)	46.54	María Mello (URU)	43.17	Beatriz Batista (BRA)	41.94
Heptathlon	Tamara de Sousa (BRA)	5545	Debora De Oliveira (BRA)	4591	Julieth Caballero (COL)	4189
10000 metres Walk	Sandra Arenas (COL)	47:22.68 CR	Angela Castro (BOL)	47:37.34	Wendy Cornejo (BOL)	49:13.40
4 × 100 metres relay	Brazil; Tamiris de Liz; Jessica dos Reis; Andressa Fidelis; Fabricia de Morães	44.64	Colombia; Merlin Palacios; Natalia Pinzón; Yanet Largacha; Maderley Alcazar	46.39	Chile; Victoria Fernández; Viviana Olivares; Josefina Gutiérrez; Macarena Borie	46.97
4 × 400 metres relay	Colombia; Rosa Escobar; Evelis Aguilar; Yanet Largacha; Melissa Torres	3:36.74 CR, AU20R	Brazil; Natalia da Silva; Ana Da Silva; Debora dos Santos; Lorayna Lima	3:42.64	Argentina; María Florencia Lamboglia; Virginia Cardozo; Ana Funes; Mariana Borelli	3:56.53

== Medal table ==
The medal count was published.

* Host nation (Colombia)

Rank	Nation	Gold	Silver	Bronze	Total
1	Brazil	22	16	11	49
2	Colombia*	10	14	16	40
3	Argentina	4	1	6	11
4	Peru	3	4	0	7
5	Ecuador	3	0	3	6
6	Venezuela	1	4	0	5
7	Chile	1	2	4	7
8	Uruguay	1	1	0	2
9	Bolivia	0	1	2	3
10	Guyana	0	0	1	1
10	Panama	0	0	1	1
Totals (11 entries)		45	43	44	132

== Team trophies ==
The placing tables for team trophy (overall team, men and women categories) were published.

=== Total ===
The host country is highlighted in lavender blue

Rank	Nation	Points
1st place, gold medalist(s)	Brazil	458
2nd place, silver medalist(s)	Colombia	328
3rd place, bronze medalist(s)	Argentina	119
4	Chile	83
5	Ecuador	76
6	Peru	63
7	Venezuela	59
8	Bolivia	28
9	Uruguay	18
10	Suriname	10
11	Panama	8
12	Paraguay	6
13	Guyana	4

=== Male ===
The host country is highlighted in lavender blue

Rank	Nation	Points
1st place, gold medalist(s)	Brazil	228
2nd place, silver medalist(s)	Colombia	174
3rd place, bronze medalist(s)	Argentina	73
4	Chile	56
5	Ecuador	46
6	Venezuela	35
7	Bolivia	17
8	Guyana	4
8	Panama	4
10	Uruguay	2
11	Peru	1

=== Female ===
The host country is highlighted in lavender blue

Rank	Nation	Points
1st place, gold medalist(s)	Brazil	230
2nd place, silver medalist(s)	Colombia	154
3rd place, bronze medalist(s)	Peru	62
4	Argentina	46
5	Ecuador	30
6	Chile	27
7	Venezuela	24
8	Uruguay	16
9	Bolivia	11
10	Suriname	10
11	Paraguay	6
12	Panama	4
