= Joaquín Ballivián =

Chilean shot putter

Personal information
- Full name: José Joaquín Ballivián Achondo
- Nationality: Chile
- Born: 22 April 1993 (age 33) Santiago, Chile
- Height: 1.80 m (5 ft 11 in)
- Weight: 123 kg (271 lb)

Sport
- Sport: Track and field
- Event: Shot put
- Club: Club deportivo universidad catolica

Achievements and titles
- Personal best(s): SP (7.3 kg): 17.90 m (Santiago 2012); SP (6 kg): 20,19 m (Santiago 2011); SP (5 kg): 20.53 m (Santiago 2010)
Medal record
Men's Athletics
Representing Chile
South American U-23 Championships
Bronze medal – third place	2012 São Paulo	Shot put
South American Junior Championships
Gold medal – first place	2011 Medellín	Shot put
South American Youth Championships
Gold medal – first place	2010 Santiago	Shot put
Bronze medal – third place	2010 Santiago	Discus throw
- Updated on 20 January 2015

José Joaquín Ballivián Achondo (born 22 April 1993) is a Chilean shot putter.

== Career ==
He won a gold medal in shot put at the 2010 South American Youth Championships in Athletics, throwing 20.53 metres to establish a new South American Youth Best.

Ballivián participated in the shot put at the 2010 Summer Youth Olympics.

== Personal bests ==
Event	Result	Venue	Date
Shot put	18.15 m	Santiago, Chile	2 July 2011
Discus throw	45.93 m	Santiago, Chile	20 May 2012

== International competitions ==
Year	Competition	Venue	Position	Event	Notes
Representing Chile
2008	South American Youth Championships	Lima, Peru	6th	Shot put (5 kg)	16.11 m
2009	South American Junior Championships	São Paulo, Brazil	3rd	Shot put (6 kg)	16.09 m
2010	Youth Olympic Games	Singapore	6th	Shot put (5 kg)	20.36 m
2010	South American Youth Championships	Santiago, Chile	1st	Shot put (5 kg)	20.53 m CR AR-y
2010	South American Youth Championships	Santiago, Chile	3rd	Discus throw (1.5 kg)	53.99 m
2011	South American Junior Championships	Medellín, Colombia	1st	Shot put (6 kg)	19.31 m
2011	South American Junior Championships	Medellín, Colombia	8th	Discus throw (1.75 kg)	49.10 m
2012	World Junior Championships	Barcelona, Spain	9th	Shot put (6 kg)	19.47 m
2012	South American U23 Championships	São Paulo, Brazil	3rd	Shot put	17.28 m
2013	Universiade	Kazan, Russia	16th (q)	Shot put	17.27 m
2013	Bolivarian Games	Trujillo, Peru	5th	Shot put	16.42 m
2014	South American U23 Championships	Montevideo, Uruguay	4th	Shot put	16.10 m
2023	South American Championships	São Paulo, Brazil	6th	Shot put	17.28 m
2024	South American Indoor Championships	Cochabamba, Bolivia	5th	Shot put	17.37 m
2025	Bolivarian Games	Lima, Peru	4th	Shot put	17.33 m
2026	South American Indoor Championships	Cochabamba, Bolivia	4th	Shot put	17.30 m
