= Andressa Fidelis =

Brazilian sprinter (born 1994)

Personal information
- Full name: Andressa Moreira Fidelis
- Nationality: Brazilian
- Born: 20 January 1994 (age 32)

Sport
- Country: Brazil
- Sport: Athletics
Medal record
Athletics
Representing Brazil
Pan American Games
Gold medal – first place	2019 Lima	4×100m relay
South American Championships
Gold medal – first place	2019 Lima	4×100m relay
South American Junior Championships
Gold medal – first place	2011 Medellín	4×100m relay
Gold medal – first place	2013 Resistencia	long jump
Silver medal – second place	2013 Resistencia	4×100m relay
South American Under-23 Championships
Gold medal – first place	2014 Montevideo	4×100m relay
Silver medal – second place	2010 Santiago	long jump
Bronze medal – third place	2012 São Paulo	4×100m relay

Andressa Moreira Fidelis (born 20 January 1994) is a Brazilian female sprinter. She represented Brazil at the 2010 Summer Youth Olympics and went on to represent Brazil at senior level competitions including the 2019 South American Championships and in 2019 Pan American Games.

She was part of the Brazilian contingent at the 2019 Pan American Games and claimed gold medal in the women's 4 × 100 m event.
