= Athletics at the 2018 Central American and Caribbean Games =

Athletics at the XXIII CAC Games
- Dates: 29 July – 3 August
- Host city: Barranquilla, Colombia
- Venue: Estadio Metropolitano Roberto Meléndez
- Events: 46
- Participation: 468 athletes from 35 nations

The athletics competition at the 2018 Central American and Caribbean Games was held in Barranquilla, Colombia from 29 July to 3 August at the Estadio Metropolitano Roberto Meléndez (warm-up Rafael Cotes Stadium).

== Medal summary ==
=== Men's events ===
Event	Gold		Silver		Bronze	
100 m	Nesta Carter; Jamaica	10.07 SB	Jason Rogers; Saint Kitts and Nevis	10.15	Cejhae Greene; Antigua and Barbuda	10.16
200 m	Bernardo Baloyes; Colombia	20.13	Alonso Edward; Panama	20.17	Kyle Greaux; Trinidad and Tobago	20.26
400 m	Luguelín Santos; Dominican Republic	44.59 SB	Yoandys Lescay; Cuba	45.38 SB	Nery Brenes; Costa Rica	45.61
800 m	Jesús Tonatiu López; Mexico	1:45.2	Ryan Sánchez; Puerto Rico	1:46.3	Wesley Vázquez; Puerto Rico	1:46.6
1500 m	Fernando Daniel Martínez; Mexico	3:56.57	José Eduardo Rodríguez; Mexico	3:56.70	Carlos San Martín; Colombia	3:56.78
5000 m	José Mauricio González; Colombia	13:53.40 SB	Mario Pacay; Guatemala	13:56.30	Víctor Montañez; Mexico	14:05.87 PB
10,000 m	Juan Luis Barrios; Mexico	30:07.49	Mario Pacay; Guatemala	30:09.79	Iván Darío González; Colombia	30:15.23
110 m hurdles	Shane Brathwaite; Barbados	13.38 SB	Ruebin Walters; Trinidad and Tobago	13.57	Roger Iribarne; Cuba	13.58
400 m hurdles	Kyron McMaster; British Virgin Islands	47.60 GR	Annsert Whyte; Jamaica	48.50 SB	Juander Santos; Dominican Republic	48.77 SB
3000 m steeplechase	Gerard Giraldo; Colombia	8:44.51 SB	Ricardo Estremera; Puerto Rico	8:46.24 SB	Andrés Camilo Camargo; Colombia	8:50.66
4 × 100 m relay	Barbados; Shane Brathwaite; Mario Burke; Burkheart Ellis; Jaquone Hoyte	38.41 NR	Dominican Republic; Christopher Valdez; Yohandris Andújar; Stanly del Carmen; Yancarlos Martínez	38.71 SB	Jamaica; Nesta Carter; Romario Williams; Rasheed Dwyer; Javoy Tucker	38.79
4 × 400 m relay	Cuba; Leandro Zamora; Adrián Chacón; Raydel Rojas; Yoandys Lescay	3:03.87 SB	Dominican Republic; Luguelín Santos; Juander Santos; Andito Charles; Leonel Bonón	3:03.92 SB	Colombia; Diego Palomeque; Rafith Rodríguez; Yilmar Herrera; Jhon Perlaza	3:04.35 SB
Marathon	Jeison Suárez; Colombia	2:29:54	Daniel Vargas; Mexico	2:30:30	Williams Julajuj; Guatemala	2:31:42
20 km walk	Éider Arévalo; Colombia	1:26:42	Manuel Esteban Soto; Colombia	1:26:59	Érick Barrondo; Guatemala	1:27:17
50 km walk	José Leyver Ojeda; Mexico	4:02:45	Jorge Armando Ruiz; Colombia	4:05:28	José Leonardo Montaña; Colombia	4:08:10
High jump	Donald Thomas; Bahamas	2.28 m	Eure Yáñez; Venezuela	2.28 m =SB	Jermaine Francis; Saint Kitts and Nevis	2.28 m NR
Pole vault	Lázaro Borges; Cuba Walter Viáfara; Colombia	5.30 m SB 5.30 m =PB	Not awarded		Eduardo Nápoles; Cuba	5.20 m
Long jump	Ramone Bailey; Jamaica	8.07 m	Tyrone Smith; Bermuda	8.03 m SB	Andwuelle Wright; Trinidad and Tobago	7.94 m
Triple jump	Cristian Nápoles; Cuba	17.34 m PB	Jordan Díaz; Cuba	17.29 m w	Miguel van Assen; Suriname	16.96 m NR
Shot put	O'Dayne Richards; Jamaica	21.02 m GR	Ashinia Miller; Jamaica	20.19 m	Eldred Henry; British Virgin Islands	20.18 m NR
Discus throw	Mauricio Ortega; Colombia	66.30 m NR	Jorge Yedián Fernández; Cuba	65.27 m SB	Traves Smikle; Jamaica	64.68 m
Hammer throw	Diego del Real; Mexico	74.95 m GR	Rainier Mejías; Cuba	73.28 m	Roberto Janet; Cuba	73.11 m
Javelin throw	Keshorn Walcott; Trinidad and Tobago	84.47 m	Anderson Peters; Grenada	81.80 m	David Carreón; Mexico	76.27 m
Decathlon	Leonel Suárez; Cuba	8026 pts	José Lemos; Colombia	7913 pts NR	Briander Rivero; Cuba	7858 pts

=== Women's events ===
Event	Gold		Silver		Bronze	
100 m	Jonielle Smith; Jamaica	11.04	Khalifa St. Fort; Trinidad and Tobago	11.15	Andrea Purica; Venezuela	11.32
200 m	Sashalee Forbes; Jamaica	22.80 SB	Semoy Hackett; Trinidad and Tobago	22.95	Jodean Williams; Jamaica	22.96
400 m	Tiffany James; Jamaica	52.35	Fiordaliza Cofil; Dominican Republic	52.72 PB	Derri-Ann Hill; Jamaica	53.30
800 m	Rose Mary Almanza; Cuba	2:01.63	Alena Brooks; Trinidad and Tobago	2:02.26	Sonia Gaskin; Barbados	2:03.13 NR
1500 m	Rose Mary Almanza; Cuba	4:22.14 SB	Angelín Figueroa; Puerto Rico	4:22.52	Rosibel García; Colombia	4:23.43 SB
5000 m	Muriel Coneo; Colombia	16:13.47	Beverly Ramos; Puerto Rico	16:14.04	Brenda Flores; Mexico	16:16.71 SB
10,000 m	Úrsula Sánchez; Mexico	33:41.48 GR	Beverly Ramos; Puerto Rico	33:46.99 SB	Vianey de la Rosa; Mexico	34:10.75
100 m hurdles	Andrea Vargas; Costa Rica	12.90 NR	Vanessa Clerveaux; Haiti	13.07	Jeanine Williams; Jamaica	13.11
400 m hurdles	Ronda Whyte; Jamaica	55.08	Zudikey Rodríguez; Mexico	55.11 NR	Zurian Hechavarría; Cuba	55.13 PB
3000 m steeplechase	Ana Cristina Narváez; Mexico	10:00.01 SB	Beverly Ramos; Puerto Rico	10:07.71	Andrea Ferris; Panama	10:18.92 SB
4 × 100 m relay	Jamaica; Jura Levy; Sherone Simpson; Jonielle Smith; Natasha Morrison	43.41	Trinidad and Tobago; Khalifa St. Fort; Zakiyah Denoon; Reyare Thomas; Semoy Hackett	43.61	Dominican Republic; Mariely Sánchez; Marileidy Paulino; Anabel Medina; Estrella de Aza	43.68 SB
4 × 400 m relay	Cuba; Zurian Hechavarría; Rose Mary Almanza; Gilda Casanova; Roxana Gómez	3:29.48 GR	Jamaica; Derri-Ann Hill; Tiffany James; Sonikqua Walker; Junelle Bromfield	3:30.67	Colombia; Eliana Chávez; Rosangélica Escobar; Melissa Gonzalez; Jennifer Padilla	3:32.61
Marathon	Madaí Pérez; Mexico	2:57:55	Dailín Belmonte; Cuba	2:59:09	Angie Orjuela; Colombia	2:59:49
High jump	Levern Spencer; Saint Lucia	1.90 m	Ximena Esquivel; Mexico	1.86 m	María Fernanda Murillo; Colombia	1.86 m
Pole vault	Yarisley Silva; Cuba	4.70 m GR	Robeilys Peinado; Venezuela	4.50 m	Lisa Salomón; Cuba	4.10 m =PB
Long jump	Caterine Ibargüen; Colombia	6.83 m w	Chantel Malone; British Virgin Islands	6.52 m SB	Alysbeth Félix; Puerto Rico	6.45 m w
Triple jump	Caterine Ibargüen; Colombia	14.92 m GR	Yosiris Urrutia; Colombia	14.48 m w	Liadagmis Povea; Cuba	14.44 m w
Shot put	Cleopatra Borel; Trinidad and Tobago	18.14 m	Yaniuvis López; Cuba	18.03 m	María Fernanda Orozco; Mexico	17.88 NR
Discus throw	Yaime Pérez; Cuba	66.00 m GR	Denia Caballero; Cuba	65.10 m	Shaniece Love; Jamaica	58.40 m PB
Hammer throw	Rosa Rodríguez; Venezuela	67.91 m	Elianis Despaigne; Cuba	64.40 m	Yaritza Martínez; Cuba	61.44 m
Javelin throw	María Lucelly Murillo; Colombia	59.54 m	Coraly Ortiz; Puerto Rico	56.27 m	Yulenmis Aguilar; Cuba	55.60 m
Heptathlon	Yorgelis Rodríguez; Cuba	6436 pts GR	Evelis Aguilar; Colombia	6285 pts AR	Luisaris Toledo; Venezuela	5848 pts NR

== Medal table ==
* Host nation (Colombia)

Rank	Nation	Gold	Silver	Bronze	Total
1	Colombia (COL)*	11	5	9	25
2	Cuba (CUB)	10	8	9	27
3	Mexico (MEX)	8	4	5	17
4	Jamaica (JAM)	8	3	6	17
5	Trinidad and Tobago (TTO)	2	5	2	9
6	Barbados (BAR)	2	0	1	3
7	Dominican Republic (DOM)	1	3	2	6
8	Venezuela (VEN)	1	2	2	5
9	British Virgin Islands (IVB)	1	1	1	3
10	Costa Rica (CRC)	1	0	1	2
11	Bahamas (BAH)	1	0	0	1
11	Saint Lucia (LCA)	1	0	0	1
13	Puerto Rico (PUR)	0	7	2	9
14	Guatemala (GUA)	0	2	2	4
15	Panama (PAN)	0	1	1	2
15	Saint Kitts and Nevis (SKN)	0	1	1	2
17	Bermuda (BER)	0	1	0	1
17	Grenada (GRN)	0	1	0	1
17	Haiti (HAI)	0	1	0	1
20	Antigua and Barbuda (ATG)	0	0	1	1
20	Suriname (SUR)	0	0	1	1
Totals (21 entries)		47	45	46	138

== Participating nations ==
- Antigua and Barbuda (2)
- Aruba (2)
- Bahamas (10)
- Barbados (15)
- Belize (2)
- Bermuda (5)
- British Virgin Islands (13)
- Cayman Islands (4)
- Colombia (50)
- Costa Rica (17)
- Cuba (52)
- Curaçao (6)
- Dominica (2)
- Dominican Republic (26)
- French Guiana (2)
- Grenada (3)
- Guatemala (22)
- Guyana (5)
- Haiti (8)
- Honduras (2)
- Jamaica (45)
- Martinique (4)
- Mexico (40)
- Nicaragua (2)
- Panama (17)
- Puerto Rico (20)
- Saint Kitts and Nevis (6)
- Saint Lucia (3)
- Saint Vincent and the Grenadines (2)
- El Salvador (6)
- Suriname (4)
- Trinidad and Tobago (28)
- Turks and Caicos Islands (7)
- United States Virgin Islands (9)
- Venezuela (27)
