= Diego Palomeque =

Colombian sprinter (born 1993)

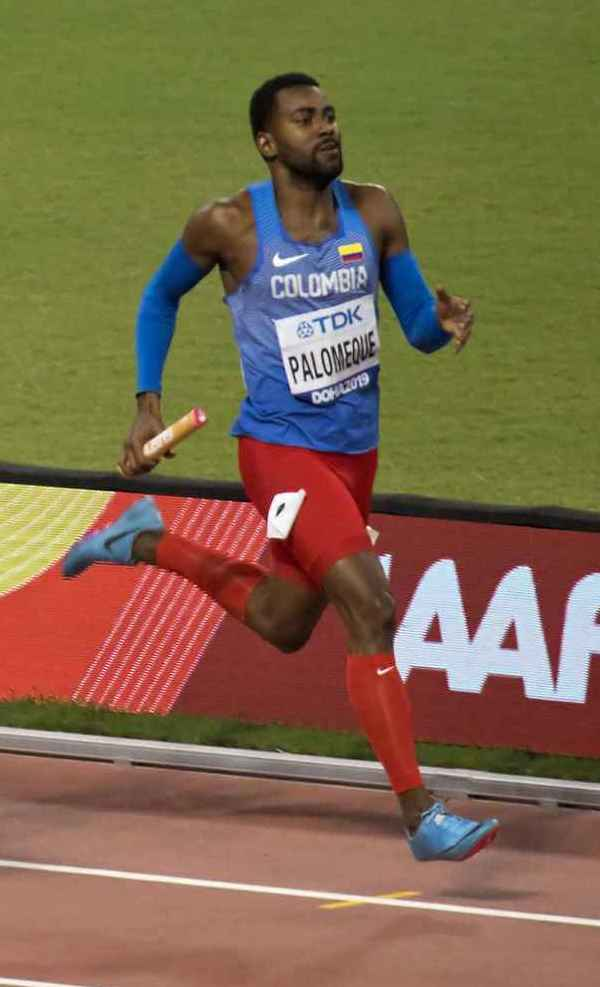
- Palomeque (right) in 2019

Personal information
- Full name: Diego Armando Palomeque Echavarría
- Nationality: Colombia
- Born: 5 December 1993 (age 32) Apartadó, Antioquia, Colombia
- Height: 1.76 m (5 ft 9 in)
- Weight: 67 kg (148 lb)

Sport
- Sport: Athletics
- Event: Sprints

Achievements and titles
- Personal best(s): 100 m: 10.11 (Asunción 2017); 200 m: 20.32 (Medellín 2017); 400 m: 45.25 (Medellín 2016)
Medal record
Men's athletics
Representing Colombia
Pan American Games
Gold medal – first place	2019 Lima	4×400 m relay
South American Championships
Gold medal – first place	2015 Lima	100 m
Gold medal – first place	2017 Asunción	100 m
Gold medal – first place	2017 Asunción	4×400 m relay
Gold medal – first place	2019 Lima	4×400 m relay
Silver medal – second place	2015 Lima	200 m
Silver medal – second place	2011 Buenos Aires	4×400 m relay
Silver medal – second place	2017 Asunción	4×100 m relay
Bronze medal – third place	2015 Lima	4×100 m relay
Bronze medal – third place	2019 Lima	100 m
Bronze medal – third place	2019 Lima	4×100 m relay
South American U20 Championships
Gold medal – first place	2011 Medellín	200 m
Silver medal – second place	2011 Medellín	100 m
Silver medal – second place	2011 Medellín	4×100 m relay
Silver medal – second place	2011 Medellín	4×400 m relay
South American U18 Championships
Silver medal – second place	2010 Santiago	400 m
- Updated on 3 September 2025

Diego Armando Palomeque Echavarría (Note: In this Spanish name, the first or paternal surname is Palomeque and the second or maternal family name is Echavarría.) (born 5 December 1993) is a Colombian sprinter.

== Career ==
He tied Aldemir da Silva Junior for the 200 metres title at the 2011 South American Junior Championships in Athletics.

On 28 April 2012, Palomeque broke the Colombian National Junior Record in the 400 metres with 45.62, thereby also meeting the 'B'-Standard to qualify for the 2012 Summer Olympics. He was initially suspended and later excluded from the games after testing positive for exogenous testosterone. He was banned for two years between 12 August 2012 and 11 August 2014.

He competed at the 2020 Summer Olympics.

== Personal bests ==
- 100 m: 10.11 s (wind: +1.9 m/s) – Asunción, Paraguay, 23 June 2017
- 200 m: 20.32 s (wind: +0.5 m/s) – Medellín, Colombia, 11 June 2017
- 400 m: 45.25 s A– Medellín, Colombia, 30 April 2016

== Achievements ==
Year	Competition	Venue	Position	Event	Notes
Representing Colombia
2010	South American Youth Championships	Santiago, Chile	2nd	400 m	47.89
2011	South American Championships	Buenos Aires, Argentina	2nd	4 × 400 m relay	3:09.67
2011	Pan American Junior Championships	Miramar, United States	4th	400 m	48.30
2011	South American Junior Championships	Medellín, Colombia	2nd	100 m	10.45 A (0.0 m/s)
2011	South American Junior Championships	Medellín, Colombia	1st	200 m	20.94 A (0.0 m/s)
2011	South American Junior Championships	Medellín, Colombia	2nd	4 × 100 m relay	40.08 A
2011	South American Junior Championships	Medellín, Colombia	2nd	4 × 400 m relay	3:08.71 A
2012	Ibero-American Championships	Barquisimeto, Venezuela	5th	400 m	46.52
2012	World Junior Championships	Barcelona, Spain	30th (h)	400 m	47.55
2014	Pan American Sports Festival	Mexico City, Mexico	8th	100 m	10.51 A (-1.3 m/s)
2014	Pan American Sports Festival	Mexico City, Mexico	9th (h)	200 m	21.09 A (-0.6 m/s)
2014	South American Under-23 Championships	Montevideo, Uruguay	3rd	200 m	21.02 (+1.4 m/s)
2014	South American Under-23 Championships	Montevideo, Uruguay	3rd	4 × 400 m relay	3:11.95
2014	Central American and Caribbean Games	Xalapa, Mexico	3rd (h)	100 m	10.45 A (-0.7 m/s)
2014	Central American and Caribbean Games	Xalapa, Mexico	3rd	4 × 400 m relay	3:02.52 A
2015	South American Championships	Lima, Peru	1st	100m	10.40 (-1.1 m/s)
2015	South American Championships	Lima, Peru	2nd	200m	21.15 (0.0 m/s)
2015	South American Championships	Lima, Peru	3rd	4 × 100 m relay	40.80
2017	World Championships	London, United Kingdom	41st (h)	100 m	10.45
2017	World Championships	London, United Kingdom	12th (h)	4 × 400 m relay	3:03.68
2017	Bolivarian Games	Santa Marta, Colombia	2nd	100 m	10.31
2017	Bolivarian Games	Santa Marta, Colombia	2nd	4 × 100 m relay	39.58
2018	South American Games	Cochabamba, Bolivia	7th	100 m	10.39
2018	South American Games	Cochabamba, Bolivia	–	200 m	DNF
2018	South American Games	Cochabamba, Bolivia	1st	4 × 100 m relay	38.97
2018	South American Games	Cochabamba, Bolivia	1st	4 × 400 m relay	3:04.78
2018	Central American and Caribbean Games	Barranquilla, Colombia	10th (h)	100 m	10.31^{1}
2018	Central American and Caribbean Games	Barranquilla, Colombia	6th	4 × 100 m relay	39.17
2018	Central American and Caribbean Games	Barranquilla, Colombia	3rd	4 × 400 m relay	3:04.35
2019	World Relays	Yokohama, Japan	8th (B)	4 × 400 m relay	3:07.52
2019	South American Championships	Lima, Peru	3rd	100 m	10.47
2019	South American Championships	Lima, Peru	3rd	4 × 100 m relay	39.94
2019	South American Championships	Lima, Peru	1st	4 × 400 m relay	3:04.04
2019	Pan American Games	Lima, Peru	21st (h)	100 m	10.65
2019	Pan American Games	Lima, Peru	1st	4 × 400 m relay	3:01.41
2019	World Championships	Doha, Qatar	4th	4 × 400 m relay	2:59.50
2021	Olympic Games	Tokyo, Japan	13th (h)	4 × 400 m relay	3:03.20

^{1}Did not start in the semifinals
