= 2019 South American Championships in Athletics =

51st South American Championships
- Dates: 24–26 May
- Host city: Lima, Peru
- Venue: Villa Deportiva Nacional
- Level: Senior
- Events: 44 (22 men, 22 women)
- Participation: 325 athletes from 13 nations

2019 South American Championships in Athletics was the 51st edition of the biennial athletics competition between South American nations. The event was held in Lima, Peru, from 24 to 26 May at the Villa Deportiva Nacional.

== Medal summary ==
=== Men ===
Event	Gold		Silver		Bronze	
100 metres (wind: -0.9 m/s)	Rodrigo do Nascimento (BRA)	10.28	Felipe Bardi (BRA)	10.43	Diego Palomeque (COL)	10.47
200 metres (wind: -0.7 m/s)	Bernardo Baloyes (COL)	20.42 CR	Rodrigo do Nascimento (BRA)	20.63	Christopher Ortiz (PAR)	20.98
400 metres	Anthony Zambrano (COL)	45.53	Lucas Carvalho (BRA)	46.12	Anderson Henriques (BRA)	46.15
800 metres	Lucirio Antonio Garrido (VEN)	1:46.27	Jelssin Robledo (COL)	1:47.31	Marco Vilca (PER)	1:48.06
1500 metres	Lucirio Antonio Garrido (VEN)	3:55.04	Diego Lacamoire (ARG)	3:55.15	Carlos de Oliveira Santos (BRA)	3:55.18
5000 metres	Altobeli da Silva (BRA)	13:50.08 CR	José Luis Rojas (PER)	13:53.11	Gerard Giraldo (COL)	13:54.51
10,000 metres	Bayron Piedra (ECU)	28:48.13	José Mauricio González (COL)	28:48.60	Vidal Basco (BOL)	28:52.32 NR
110 metres hurdles (wind: -0.8 m/s)	Gabriel Constantino (BRA)	13.54	Yohan Chaverra (COL)	13.66	Eduardo Rodrigues de Deus (BRA)	13.68
400 metres hurdles	Alison dos Santos (BRA)	49.88	Alfredo Sepúlveda (CHI)	50.03	Guillermo Ruggeri (ARG)	50.20
3000 m steeplechase	Carlos San Martín (COL)	8:36.37	Altobeli da Silva (BRA)	8:38.43	Gerard Giraldo (COL)	8:41.48
4 × 100 metres relay	Venezuela; Alberto Aguilar; Abdel Kalil; Alexis Nieves; Rafael Vázquez	39.56	Brazil; Erik Cardoso; Gabriel Constantino; Rodrigo do Nascimento; Eduardo de Deus	39.91	Colombia; Jhonny Rentería; Diego Palomeque; Yilmar Herrera; Bernardo Baloyes	39.94
4 × 400 metres relay	Colombia; Jhon Solís; Diego Palomeque; Kevin Mina; Anthony Zambrano	3:04.04	Brazil; Lucas Carvalho; Alison dos Santos; Mahau Suguimati; Anderson Henriques	3:04.13	Chile; Enzo Faulbaum; Rafael Muñoz; Alejandro Peirano; Alfredo Sepúlveda	3:11.84
20,000 m track walk	Jhon Castañeda (COL)	1:22:33.4	David Hurtado (ECU)	1:23:39.7	Luis Henry Campos (PER)	1:24:17.5
High jump	Alexander Bowen (PAN)	2.21	Fernando Ferreira (BRA)	2.21	Eure Yáñez (VEN)	2.18
Pole vault	Augusto Dutra de Oliveira (BRA)	5.61	Thiago Braz da Silva (BRA)	5.41	Germán Chiaraviglio (ARG)	5.21
Long jump	Emiliano Lasa (URU)	7.76	Paulo Sérgio Oliveira (BRA)	7.71	Raúl Mena (COL)	7.66
Triple jump	Maximiliano Díaz (ARG)	16.23	Kauam Bento (BRA)	16.18	Miguel van Assen (SUR)	16.11
Shot put	Darlan Romani (BRA)	21.00	Willian Dourado (BRA)	19.09	Germán Lauro (ARG)	18.97
Discus throw	Mauricio Ortega (COL)	58.89	Douglas dos Reis (BRA)	56.43	Claudio Romero (CHI)	54.31
Hammer throw	Gabriel Kehr (CHI)	75.27 CR	Humberto Mansilla (CHI)	73.00	Allan Wolski (BRA)	72.51
Javelin throw	Dayron Márquez (COL)	78.00	Francisco Muse (CHI)	75.97	Arley Ibargüen (COL)	75.83
Decathlon	Georni Jaramillo (VEN)	7784	Gerson Izaguirre (VEN)	7302	Sergio Pandiani (ARG)	7226
WR world record | AR area record | CR championship record | GR games record | NR national record | OR Olympic record | PB personal best | SB season best | WL world leading (in a given season)

=== Women ===
Event	Gold		Silver		Bronze	
100 metres (wind: +0.6 m/s)	Vitória Cristina Rosa (BRA)	11.24	Andrea Purica (VEN)	11.32	Gabriela Suárez (ECU)	11.67
200 metres (wind: +0.8 m/s)	Vitória Cristina Rosa (BRA)	22.90	Andrea Purica (VEN)	23.37	Gabriela Suárez (ECU)	23.65
400 metres	Tiffani Marinho (BRA)	52.81	Lina Licona (COL)	53.18	Noelia Martínez (ARG)	53.47
800 metres	Déborah Rodríguez (URU)	2:02.68	Andrea Calderón (ECU)	2:05.49	Johana Arrieta (COL)	2:05.91
1500 metres	María Pía Fernández (URU)	4:27.44	Mariana Borelli (ARG)	4:27.83	July da Silva (BRA)	4:27.93
5000 metres	Florencia Borelli (ARG)	15:42.60 NR	Carolina Tabares (COL)	15:46.04	Luz Mery Rojas (PER)	15:46.27
10,000 metres	Carolina Tabares (COL)	33:36.77	Tatiele de Carvalho (BRA)	33:40.76	Muriel Coneo (COL)	33:43.00
100 metres hurdles (wind: -0.1 m/s)	Génesis Romero (VEN)	13.29	Eliecith Palacios (COL)	13.49	Adelly Santos (BRA)	13.64
400 metres hurdles	Melissa Gonzalez (COL)	55.73 CR	Gianna Woodruff (PAN)	56.76	Fiorella Chiappe (ARG)	57.03
3000 m steeplechase	Tatiane Raquel da Silva (BRA)	9:45.52 CR	Belén Casetta (ARG)	10:04.54	Simone Ferraz (BRA)	10:05.88
4 × 100 metres relay	Brazil; Anny de Bassi; Ana Azevedo; Bruna Farias; Andressa Fidelis	44.70	Colombia; Melissa Gonzalez; Jennifer Padilla; Eliana Chávez; Eliecith Palacios	44.97	Argentina; Florencia Lamboglia; Noelia Martínez; María Sánchez; María Victoria Woodward	45.65
4 × 400 metres relay	Colombia; Lina Licona; Melissa Gonzalez; Eliana Chávez; Jennifer Padilla	3:32.81	Brazil; Ana Azevedo; Marlene Santos; Alessandra Silva; Tiffani Marinho	3:35.29	Argentina; María Ayelén Diogo; Fiorella Chiappe; Valeria Baron; Noelia Martínez	3:36.76
20,000 m track walk	Karla Jaramillo (ECU)	1:30:52.0 CR, AR	Ángela Castro (BOL)	1:32:35.9	Leyde Guerra (PER)	1:33:40.0
High jump	María Fernanda Murillo (COL)	1.90	Valdileia Martins (BRA)	1.80	Eloisa Páez (ARG); Monique Varmeling (BRA)	1.75
Pole vault	Robeilys Peinado (VEN)	4.56	Katherine Castillo (COL)	4.11	Juliana Campos (BRA)	3.91
Long jump	Eliane Martins (BRA)	6.71	Keila Costa (BRA)	6.38	Macarena Reyes (CHI)	6.36
Triple jump	Yosiris Urrutia (COL)	13.85	Liuba Zaldivar (ECU)	13.45	Gabriele dos Santos (BRA)	13.30
Shot put	Ahymara Espinoza (VEN)	17.44	Geisa Arcanjo (BRA)	17.16	Ángela Rivas (COL)	17.10
Discus throw	Andressa de Morais (BRA)	62.42	Fernanda Martins (BRA)	60.87	Ailen Armada (ARG)	56.55
Hammer throw	Mariana Marcelino (BRA)	66.78	Rosa Rodriguez (VEN)	66.45	Jennifer Dahlgren (ARG)	65.06
Javelin throw	Laila Domingos (BRA)	57.79	María Lucelly Murillo (COL)	57.24	Flor Ruiz (COL)	56.07
Heptathlon	Luisarys Toledo (VEN)	5989 CR, NR	Vanessa Chefer Spínola (BRA)	5823	Martha Araújo (COL)	5708
WR world record | AR area record | CR championship record | GR games record | NR national record | OR Olympic record | PB personal best | SB season best | WL world leading (in a given season)

== Medal table ==
The host country is highlighted in lavender blue

Rank	Nation	Gold	Silver	Bronze	Total
1	Brazil	15	19	10	44
2	Colombia	12	9	11	32
3	Venezuela	8	4	1	13
4	Uruguay	3	0	0	3
5	Argentina	2	3	11	16
6	Ecuador	2	3	2	7
7	Chile	1	3	3	7
8	Panama	1	1	0	2
9	Peru*	0	1	4	5
10	Bolivia	0	1	1	2
11	Paraguay	0	0	1	1
11	Suriname	0	0	1	1
Totals (12 entries)		44	44	45	133

== Points table ==
Rank	Nation	Total	Men	Women
1	Brazil	378	180	198
2	Colombia	288	146	142
3	Venezuela	153	80	73
4	Argentina	120	50	70
5	Peru	82	38	44
6	Chile	78	53	25
7	Ecuador	75	32	43
8	Uruguay	37	16	21
9	Panama	26	10	16
10	Bolivia	16.5	7	9.5
11	Paraguay	13	6	7
12	Guyana	12	12	0
13	Suriname	4	4	0

== Participation ==
All 13 member federations of CONSUDATLE participated at the championships.

- Argentina (36)
- Bolivia (25)
- Brazil (57)
- Chile (29)
- Colombia (48)
- Ecuador (31)
- Guyana (6)
- Panama (11)
- Paraguay (10)
- Peru (45)
- Suriname (2)
- Uruguay (8)
- Venezuela (17)

== See also ==
- 2019 South American U20 Championships in Athletics
- Athletics at the 2019 Pan American Games
- 2019 World Championships in Athletics
