= Clara Canchanya =

Peruvian long-distance runner

Personal information
- Born: 30 August 1982 (age 43)

Sport
- Country: Peru
- Sport: Track and field
- Event: Marathon

Clara Canchanya (born 30 August 1982) is a Peruvian long-distance runner. She competed in the marathon event at the 2015 World Championships in Athletics in Beijing, China.
