= 2016 South American Under-23 Championships in Athletics – Results =

These are the full results of the 2016 South American Under-23 Championships in Athletics which took place between September 23 and 25 at Villa Deportiva Nacional in Lima, Peru.

== Men's results ==
=== 100 meters ===
Heats – September 23
Wind:
Heat 1: -2.1 m/s, Heat 2: -2.2 m/s

Rank	Heat	Name	Nationality	Time	Notes
1	2	Rodrigo do Nascimento	Brazil	10.71	Q
2	1	Ricardo de Souza	Brazil	10.73	Q
3	2	Jhonny Rentería	Colombia	10.74	Q
4	1	Deivi Díaz	Colombia	10.81	Q
5	2	Carlos Perlaza	Ecuador	10.92	Q
6	1	Fredy Maidana	Paraguay	10.97	Q
7	1	Leonel Carrizo	Argentina	11.08	q
8	2	Christopher Ortiz	Paraguay	11.12	q
9	2	Marlon de León	Ecuador	11.31	
10	1	Jesús Gonzáles	Peru	11.45	
11	1	Frank Sanchez	Peru	11.51	

Final – September 24
Wind:
+1.4 m/s

Rank	Name	Nationality	Time	Notes
1st place, gold medalist(s)	Rodrigo do Nascimento	Brazil	10.21	CR
2nd place, silver medalist(s)	Jhonny Rentería	Colombia	10.41	
3rd place, bronze medalist(s)	Ricardo de Souza	Brazil	10.47	
4	Deivi Díaz	Colombia	10.57	
5	Carlos Perlaza	Ecuador	10.67	
6	Fredy Maidana	Paraguay	10.86	
7	Leonel Carrizo	Argentina	10.95	
8	Christopher Ortiz	Paraguay	11.04	

=== 200 meters ===
Heats – September 24
Wind:
Heat 1: -1.3 m/s, Heat 2: -1.5 m/s

Rank	Heat	Name	Nationality	Time	Notes
1	1	Rodrigo do Nascimento	Brazil	21.55	Q
2	2	Fredy Maidana	Paraguay	21.71	Q
3	2	Gabriel Constantino	Brazil	21.78	Q
4	2	Carlos Perlaza	Ecuador	21.82	Q
5	1	Daniel Londero	Argentina	21.98	Q
6	1	Sergio Aldea	Chile	22.01	Q
7	1	Josué Congo	Ecuador	22.29	q
8	2	Jhonatan Grandez	Peru	22.33	q
9	2	Christopher Ortiz	Paraguay	22.55	
10	1	Mauricio Garrido	Peru	22.68	

Final – September 25
Wind:
0.0 m/s

Rank	Name	Nationality	Time	Notes
1st place, gold medalist(s)	Rodrigo do Nascimento	Brazil	21.20	
2nd place, silver medalist(s)	Fredy Maidana	Paraguay	21.36	
3rd place, bronze medalist(s)	Gabriel Constantino	Brazil	21.42	
4	Carlos Perlaza	Ecuador	21.79	
5	Daniel Londero	Argentina	21.93	
6	Sergio Aldea	Chile	22.07	
7	Jhonatan Grandez	Peru	22.49	
	Josué Congo	Ecuador	DNS	

=== 400 meters ===
September 24

Rank	Name	Nationality	Time	Notes
1st place, gold medalist(s)	Alexander Russo	Brazil	47.07	
2nd place, silver medalist(s)	Sergio Aldea	Chile	47.74	
3rd place, bronze medalist(s)	Josué Congo	Ecuador	48.09	
4	Paulo Herrera	Peru	49.24	
5	Fernando Copa	Bolivia	49.39	
6	Luis Iriarte	Peru	49.43	
7	Rafael Muñoz	Chile	50.16	
8	Steeven Medina	Ecuador	52.03	

=== 800 meters ===
September 24

Rank	Name	Nationality	Time	Notes
1st place, gold medalist(s)	Leandro Paris	Argentina	1:48.31	
2nd place, silver medalist(s)	Jelssin Robledo	Colombia	1:48.85	
3rd place, bronze medalist(s)	Cristhian Castro	Peru	1:51.88	
4	Carlos Maturana	Chile	1:52.06	
5	Jean Jácome	Ecuador	1:52.60	
6	Cristofer Jarpa	Chile	1:53.31	
7	Wellerson Falcão Vivi	Brazil	1:53.36	
8	Giovanni Villalba	Paraguay	1:53.89	
9	Andy Cedeño	Ecuador	1:54.54	
	Mateo Rossetto	Argentina	DNS	

=== 1500 meters ===
September 23

Rank	Name	Nationality	Time	Notes
1st place, gold medalist(s)	Rafael Vicente Loza	Ecuador	3:56.37	
2nd place, silver medalist(s)	Carlos Maturana	Chile	3:56.66	
3rd place, bronze medalist(s)	Wellerson Falcão Vivi	Brazil	3:56.84	
4	Gerson Montes de Oca	Ecuador	3:59.79	
5	Zendio Daza	Peru	3:59.97	
6	Moises Huillca	Peru	4:01.40	
7	Cristopher Jarpa	Chile	4:07.29	

=== 5000 meters ===
September 25

Rank	Name	Nationality	Time	Notes
1st place, gold medalist(s)	Daniel Ferreira do Nascimento	Brazil	14:27.78	
2nd place, silver medalist(s)	Walter Ñaupa	Peru	14:28.06	
3rd place, bronze medalist(s)	Yuri Labra	Peru	14:29.81	
4	Vidal Basco	Bolivia	14:41.92	
5	Rafael Vicente Loza	Ecuador	14:43.20	
6	Gerson Montes De Oca	Ecuador	14:45.13	
7	Eulalio Muñoz	Argentina	14:50.27	
8	Felipe Lizana	Chile	14:50.85	
9	Willington Valenzuela	Chile	15:21.23	
	Douglas Nascimento	Brazil	DNS	

=== 10,000 meters ===
September 23

Rank	Name	Nationality	Time	Notes
1st place, gold medalist(s)	Jhordan Ccope	Peru	30:01.18	
2nd place, silver medalist(s)	Mauricio Díaz	Peru	30:01.58	
3rd place, bronze medalist(s)	Vidal Basco	Bolivia	30:05.63	
4	Juan Carlos Huiza	Bolivia	30:18.26	
5	Eulalio Muñoz	Argentina	31:15.19	
6	Felipe Lizana	Chile	31:25.64	
7	Fernando Moreno	Ecuador	31:42.16	
8	Felipe de Miranda	Brazil	32:00.93	
9	Willington Valenzuela	Chile	32:14.07	
10	Brayan Revelo	Ecuador	32:22.16	

=== 110 meters hurdles ===
September 24
Wind: +0.4 m/s

Rank	Name	Nationality	Time	Notes
1st place, gold medalist(s)	Gabriel Constantino	Brazil	14.10	
2nd place, silver medalist(s)	Juan Carlos Moreno	Colombia	14.10	
3rd place, bronze medalist(s)	Mauricio Garrido	Peru	14.45	
4	Patricio Colarte	Chile	14.54	
5	Gastón Sayago	Argentina	14.67	
6	Rodrigo Silva	Peru	14.90	
7	Steeven Medina	Ecuador	15.45	

=== 400 meters hurdles ===
September 25

Rank	Name	Nationality	Time	Notes
1st place, gold medalist(s)	Marcio Teles	Brazil	59.26	
2nd place, silver medalist(s)	Steeven Medina	Ecuador	52.98	
3rd place, bronze medalist(s)	Diego Courbis	Chile	53.51	
4	Ian Corozo	Ecuador	53.56	
5	Claudio Moreira	Chile	54.46	
6	Juan Miguel Carreño	Peru	55.73	

=== 3000 meters steeplechase ===
September 24

Rank	Name	Nationality	Time	Notes
1st place, gold medalist(s)	Daniel Ferreira do Nascimento	Brazil	9:05.40	
2nd place, silver medalist(s)	Walter Ñaupa	Peru	9:13.84	
3rd place, bronze medalist(s)	Gerson Montes de Oca	Ecuador	9:21.95	
4	Marcelo Silva	Chile	9:23.92	
5	Javier Silva	Chile	9:37.24	
6	Richar Calizaya	Peru	9:44.97	
	Erick Javiralciva	Ecuador	DNS	
	Douglas Nascimento	Brazil	DNS	

=== 4 × 100 meters relay ===
September 24

Rank	Nation	Competitors	Time	Notes
1st place, gold medalist(s)	Brazil	Derick Silva, Rodrigo do Nascimento, Gabriel Constantino, Ricardo de Souza	39.86	
2nd place, silver medalist(s)	Colombia	Juan Carlos Moreno, Deivi Díaz, Jhonny Rentería, Raúl Mena	40.70	
3rd place, bronze medalist(s)	Argentina	Juan Ulián, Leonel Carrizo, Daniel Londero, Gastón Sayago	41.47	
4	Ecuador	Josué Congo, Carlos Perlaza, Marlon de León, José Pacho	41.53	
5	Peru	Jesús Gonzáles, Mauricio Garrido, Jonathan Grande, Diego Tapia	42.27	

=== 4 × 400 meters relay ===
September 25

Rank	Nation	Competitors	Time	Notes
1st place, gold medalist(s)	Brazil	Rodrigo do Nascimento, Marcio Teles, Rafael Francisco, Alexander Russo	3:13.73	
2nd place, silver medalist(s)	Ecuador	Jean Jácome, Carlos Peraza, Steeven Medina, Ian Corozo	3:17.23	
3rd place, bronze medalist(s)	Argentina	Leonel Carrizo, Sergio Pandiani, Juan Ulián, Leandro Paris	3:17.91	
4	Peru	Luis Iriarte, Cristian Castro, Miguel Carrero, Paulo Herrera	3:19.09	
5	Chile	Diego Courbis, Claudio Moreira, Rafael Muñoz, Cristopher Jarpa	3:19.76	
	Colombia		DNS	

=== 20,000 meters walk ===
September 24

Rank	Name	Nationality	Time	Notes
1st place, gold medalist(s)	Iván Garrido	Colombia	1:24:41.22	
2nd place, silver medalist(s)	Kenny Martín Pérez	Colombia	1:25:18.00	
3rd place, bronze medalist(s)	Paolo Yurivilca	Peru	1:25:18.13	
4	Pablo Rodríguez	Bolivia	1:25:41.99	
5	César Rodríguez	Peru	1:25:45.52	
6	Rodrigo Zevallos	Bolivia	1:34:52.17	
7	Max Batista dos Santos	Brazil	1:35:50.62	
	Bryan Pintado	Ecuador	DNS	
	David Velazues	Ecuador	DNS	

=== High jump ===
September 24

Rank	Name	Nationality	1.85	1.90	1.95	2.00	2.05	2.08	2.11	2.14	2.17	2.20	2.23	Result	Notes
1st place, gold medalist(s)	Fernando Ferreira	Brazil	–	–	–	–	–	o	o	o	o	o	xxx	2.20	
2nd place, silver medalist(s)	Daniel Córtez	Colombia	–	–	–	o	o	xo	o	o	xo	xxx		2.17	
3rd place, bronze medalist(s)	Jaime Escobar	Panama	–	o	–	o	xxx							2.00	
4	Julio César Vivas	Ecuador	–	o	–	xxo	xxx							2.00	
5	Rodrigo Silva	Peru	xxo	xo	?	xxx								1.95	
6	Jesie Corozo	Ecuador	–	o	–	xxx								1.90	

=== Pole vault ===
September 25

Rank	Name	Nationality	4.60	4.80	4.90	5.00	5.10	5.25	Result	Notes
1st place, gold medalist(s)	José Rodolfo Pacho	Ecuador	–	–	o	o	xo	xxx	5.10	
2nd place, silver medalist(s)	Bruno Spinelli	Brazil	–	xxo	o	xo	xxx		5.00	
3rd place, bronze medalist(s)	Josué Gutierrez	Peru	xxo	–	o	xxx			4.90	
4	Javier Zambrano	Ecuador	–	xxo	xxx				4.80	
5	Joaquín León	Peru	o	xxx					4.60	

=== Long jump ===
September 24

Rank	Name	Nationality	#1	#2	#3	#4	#5	#6	Result	Notes
1st place, gold medalist(s)	Higor Alves	Brazil	7.80	x	x	x	x	x	7.80	
2nd place, silver medalist(s)	Raúl Mena	Colombia	7.55	7.37	x	7.41	7.49w	7.61	7.61	
3rd place, bronze medalist(s)	Eduardo Landaeta	Ecuador	7.07	x	7.39	x	7.30	7.12	7.39	
4	Brian Agustín López	Argentina	7.09	6.81	x	x	x	x	7.09	
5	José Luis Mandros	Peru	x	7.05	x	7.06	x	x	7.06	
6	Álvaro Cortez	Chile	6.92	6.93	x	–	–	–	6.93	
7	Fabrizio Mautino	Peru	6.62	x	x	x	6.79	x	6.79	
8	Randy Hood	Chile	x	6.57	6.14	x	x	6.35	6.57	
9	José María Centurión	Paraguay	6.28	6.19	x				6.28	
	Brayan Castro	Ecuador							DNS	

=== Triple jump ===
September 23

Rank	Name	Nationality	#1	#2	#3	#4	#5	#6	Result	Notes
1st place, gold medalist(s)	Álvaro Cortez	Chile	15.87	x	15.88	x	–	15.91	15.91	
2nd place, silver medalist(s)	Randy Hood	Chile	14.75	15.75w	15.49w	x	–	15.39	15.75w	
3rd place, bronze medalist(s)	Mateus de Sá	Brazil	15.34	x	15.54	x	x	15.40	15.54	
4	Frixon Chila	Ecuador	14.91	13.54	14.74	–	–	14.39	14.91	
5	Jesie Corozo	Ecuador	14.51	14.10w	13.34	14.30	14.84	14.46	14.84	
6	Augusto Miró	Peru	x	14.65w	14.46w	x	x	x	14.65w	
7	Fabrizio Mautino	Peru	x	x	14.55	14.19	x	14.09	14.55	

=== Shot put ===
September 24

Rank	Name	Nationality	#1	#2	#3	#4	#5	#6	Result	Notes
1st place, gold medalist(s)	Willian Dourado	Brazil	18.25	18.71	18.54	18.41	18.08	18.99	18.99	
2nd place, silver medalist(s)	Daniel Castillo	Chile	16.40	x	15.96	x	15.25	15.31	16.40	
3rd place, bronze medalist(s)	Sebastián Lazen	Chile	16.39	16.34	x	x	16.32	16.34	16.39	
4	Eduardo Espín	Ecuador	16.17	16.01	15.86	16.25	15.42	15.88	16.25	
5	Ignacio Carballo	Argentina	15.71	x	15.89	16.12	15.11	x	16.12	

=== Discus throw ===
September 25

Rank	Name	Nationality	#1	#2	#3	#4	#5	#6	Result	Notes
1st place, gold medalist(s)	Mauricio Ortega	Colombia	57.52	56.12	55.01	57.60	x	56.12	57.60	
2nd place, silver medalist(s)	Douglas dos Reis	Brazil	49.00	52.76	50.97	x	x	x	52.76	
3rd place, bronze medalist(s)	José Miguel Ballivian	Chile	50.92	51.83	50.57	51.44	49.19	x	51.83	
4	Eduardo Quintero	Ecuador	x	x	48.39	49.76	47.15	47.59	49.76	
5	Rodrigo Cárdenas	Chile	43.75	x	x	46.81	42.68	48.70	48.70	
6	Nicolas Piriz	Uruguay	43.85	42.17	48.86	45.54	47.84	45.49	48.68	
7	Ignacio Carballo	Argentina	46.59	45.85	46.01	44.77	45.99	47.42	47.42	
8	Stefano Paz	Peru	44.63	x	45.82	42.22	43.19	42.08	45.82	

=== Hammer throw ===
September 24

Rank	Name	Nationality	#1	#2	#3	#4	#5	#6	Result	Notes
1st place, gold medalist(s)	Humberto Mansilla	Chile	72.67	x	72.11	71.38	70.71	x	72.67	CR, NR
2nd place, silver medalist(s)	Joaquín Gómez	Argentina	69.83	71.56	68.67	x	x	69.73	71.56	
3rd place, bronze medalist(s)	Gabriel Kehr	Chile	67.62	69.29	67.82	68.57	x	69.80	69.80	
4	Juan Cruz	Argentina	x	x	57.29	55.46	59.63	57.28	59.63	
5	Stalin Rodríguez	Ecuador	55.79	55.59	x	54.95	x	57.73	57.73	
6	Daniel Athanasio Silva	Brazil	x	56.45	x	x	55.08	x	56.45	

=== Javelin throw ===
September 23

Rank	Name	Nationality	#1	#2	#3	#4	#5	#6	Result	Notes
1st place, gold medalist(s)	Francisco Muse	Chile	66.44	70.80	65.87	x	70.51	71.84	71.84	
2nd place, silver medalist(s)	Giovanni Díaz	Paraguay	70.89	70.81	x	70.82	x	67.12	70.89	
3rd place, bronze medalist(s)	Pedro Luiz Barros	Brazil	x	66.37	66.23	66.53	69.42	67.55	69.42	
4	Andrés Valencia	Colombia	65.04	66.74	68.62	65.82	x	66.85	68.62	
5	Santiago de la Fuente	Chile	62.57	60.30	59.13	62.21	62.53	x	62.57	
6	Carlos Tuarez	Ecuador	57.08	57.71	58.96	x	x	x	58.96	
7	Nicolas Gonzales	Paraguay	55.30	55.47	54.81	54.06	56.74	53.87	56.74	
8	Anthony Paz	Peru	53.37	51.03	x	x	51.21	47.60	53.37	

=== Decathlon ===
September 23–24

The highest mark recorded in each event is highlighted in yellow

Rank	Athlete	Nationality	100m	LJ	SP	HJ	400m	110m H	DT	PV	JT	1500m	Points	Notes
1st place, gold medalist(s)	Andy Preciado	Ecuador	11.50	6.43	13.67	2.04	53.27	15.23	44.89	4.00	55.89	4:48.34	7162	
2nd place, silver medalist(s)	Alex Soares	Brazil	11.37	7.38	14.23	1.95	52.18	15.16	41.99	4.10	55.45	5:45.74	7079	
3rd place, bronze medalist(s)	Sergio Pandiani	Argentina	11.37	6.75	12.06	1.86	50.90	15.42	38.02	3.90	48.98	4:24.49	6968	
4	César Jofer	Chile	11.07	6.90	14.44	1.92	51.84	15.91	38.90	NM	49.53	5:09.60	6326	
	José Pacho	Ecuador	DNS	–	–	–	–	–	–	–	–	–	6326	

== Women's results ==
=== 100 meters ===
September 24
Wind: 0.0 m/s

Rank	Name	Nationality	Time	Notes
1st place, gold medalist(s)	Evelyn Rivera	Colombia	11.74	
2nd place, silver medalist(s)	Khaterine Chillambo	Ecuador	12.02	12.012
3rd place, bronze medalist(s)	Javiera Cañas	Chile	12.02	12.018
4	Tamiris de Liz	Brazil	12.17	
5	Diana Bazalar	Peru	12.26	
6	Gabriela Delgado	Peru	12.46	
7	Lize Marlene López	Paraguay	12.63	

=== 200 meters ===
September 25
Wind: 0.0 m/s

Rank	Name	Nationality	Time	Notes
1st place, gold medalist(s)	Vitória Cristina Rosa	Brazil	23.95	
2nd place, silver medalist(s)	Evelyn Rivera	Colombia	24.01	
3rd place, bronze medalist(s)	Romina Cifuentes	Ecuador	24.50	
4	Javiera Cañas	Chile	25.23	
5	Gabriela Delgado	Peru	26.02	
6	Lize Marlene López	Paraguay	26.82	
	Jimena Copara	Peru	DNS	
	Evelyn de Paula	Brazil	DNS	

=== 400 meters ===
September 24

Rank	Name	Nationality	Time	Notes
1st place, gold medalist(s)	Astrid Balanta	Colombia	54.45	
2nd place, silver medalist(s)	Eliana Chávez	Colombia	54.48	
3rd place, bronze medalist(s)	Tania Caicedo	Ecuador	56.08	
4	Jimena Copara	Peru	56.38	
5	Deyarina Ortiz	Ecuador	57.56	
6	Fatima Amarilla	Paraguay	59.03	
7	Daysiellen Dias	Brazil	59.18	

=== 800 meters ===
September 24

Rank	Name	Nationality	Time	Notes
1st place, gold medalist(s)	María Pía Fernández	Uruguay	2:08.83	
2nd place, silver medalist(s)	Johana Arrieta	Colombia	2:09.76	
3rd place, bronze medalist(s)	Johanna Castro	Chile	2:12.45	
4	Jaqueline Weber	Brazil	2:13.75	
5	Jenifer Mendez	Ecuador	2:13.86	
6	Denisse Mejía	Peru	2:17.45	
7	Fatima Amarilla	Paraguay	2:17.66	
8	Lucy Pérez	Peru	2:19.22	

=== 1500 meters ===
September 23

Rank	Name	Nationality	Time	Notes
1st place, gold medalist(s)	María Pía Fernández	Uruguay	4:24.51	
2nd place, silver medalist(s)	Zulema Arenas	Peru	4:25.46	
3rd place, bronze medalist(s)	Carmen Toaquiza	Ecuador	4:26.87	
4	Katherine Tisalema	Ecuador	4:26.91	
5	Lucy Pérez	Peru	4:49.76	
6	Luz Paco	Bolivia	5:10.64	
	Jaqueline Weber	Brazil	DNF	

=== 5000 meters ===
September 25

Rank	Name	Nationality	Time	Notes
1st place, gold medalist(s)	Saida Meneses	Peru	16:34.66	CR
2nd place, silver medalist(s)	Irma Vila	Bolivia	16:44.87	
3rd place, bronze medalist(s)	Carmen Toaquiza	Ecuador	16:47.34	
4	Jessica Paguay	Ecuador	16:52.45	
5	Rina Cjuro	Peru	17:12.24	
6	Jhoselin Camargo	Bolivia	17:34.10	
7	Jessica Soares	Brazil	17:46.09	
8	Maria Añaszco	Paraguay	18:33.03	
	Belén Casetta	Argentina	DNS	

=== 10,000 meters ===
September 23

Rank	Name	Nationality	Time	Notes
1st place, gold medalist(s)	Jessica Paguay	Ecuador	35:10.63	CR
2nd place, silver medalist(s)	Saida Ramos	Peru	35:52.81	
3rd place, bronze medalist(s)	Sunilda Lozano	Peru	36:10.55	
4	Jessica Soares	Brazil	37:16.23	
5	Jhoselin Camargo	Bolivia	38:57.39	

=== 100 meters hurdles ===
September 24
Wind: +0.0 m/s

Rank	Name	Nationality	Time	Notes
1st place, gold medalist(s)	Diana Bazalar	Peru	13.52	CR
2nd place, silver medalist(s)	Maribel Caicedo	Ecuador	13.85	
3rd place, bronze medalist(s)	Natalia Pinzón	Colombia	14.01	
4	Ana Rafaela da Costa	Brazil	14.29	
5	Leonela Graciani	Argentina	14.59	

=== 400 meters hurdles ===
September 25

Rank	Name	Nationality	Time	Notes
1st place, gold medalist(s)	Melissa Gonzalez	Colombia	59.26	
2nd place, silver medalist(s)	Dandaduea da Silva	Brazil	1:01.11	
3rd place, bronze medalist(s)	Virginia Villalba	Ecuador	1:01.58	
4	Diana Bazalar	Peru	1:02.25	
5	Fatima Amarilla	Paraguay	1:04.28	
6	Esperanza Manrique	Peru	1:06.64	

=== 3000 meters steeplechase ===
September 24

Rank	Name	Nationality	Time	Notes
1st place, gold medalist(s)	Belén Casetta	Argentina	10:05.30	CR
2nd place, silver medalist(s)	Zulema Arenas	Peru	10:05.43	
3rd place, bronze medalist(s)	Rina Cjuro	Peru	10:26.51	
4	Katherine Tisalema	Ecuador	10:34.16	
5	Erika Pilicita	Ecuador	10:58.50	
6	Edith Mamani	Bolivia	11:12.12	
7	Antonia Barros	Brazil	11:28.46	

=== 4 × 100 meters relay ===
September 24

Rank	Nation	Competitors	Time	Notes
1st place, gold medalist(s)	Ecuador	Mariana Poroso, Romina Cifuentes, Katherine Chillambo, Maribel Caicedo	45.13	
2nd place, silver medalist(s)	Brazil	Vitória Cristina Rosa, Tamiris de Liz, Mariana Ferreira, Evelyn de Paula	45.74	
3rd place, bronze medalist(s)	Peru	Jimena Copara, Diana Bazalar, Mariana Macarachvili, Gabriela Delgado	47.72	
4	Chile	Nicola Torres, Javiera Cañas, Fernanda Carabias, Macarena Borie	48.71	
	Colombia	Melissa Gonzalez, Evelyn Rivera, Natalia Pinzón, Astrid Balanta	DNF	

=== 4 × 400 meters relay ===
September 25

Rank	Nation	Competitors	Time	Notes
1st place, gold medalist(s)	Colombia	Melissa Gonzalez, Evelyn Rivera, Natalia Pinzón, Astrid Balanta	3:42.19	
2nd place, silver medalist(s)	Brazil	Daysiellen Dias, Tiffani Marinho, Karina da Rosa, Dandadeua da Silva	3:47.14	
3rd place, bronze medalist(s)	Ecuador	Virginia Villalba, Deyanira Ortiz, Coraima Cortez, Tania Caicedo	3:51.55	
4	Peru	Esperanza Manrique, Denisse Mejias, Gabriela Delgado, Jimena Copara	3:53.55	
5	Chile	Catalina Ossa, Nicola Torres, Johanna Castro, Javiera Brahm	4:22.47	

=== 20,000 meters walk ===
September 25

Rank	Name	Nationality	Time	Notes
1st place, gold medalist(s)	Sara Pulido	Colombia	1:39:14.27	
2nd place, silver medalist(s)	Leyde Guerra	Peru	1:40:29.49	
3rd place, bronze medalist(s)	Odeth Huanca	Bolivia	1:41:18.28	
4	Karla Jaramillo	Ecuador	1:43:19.78	
5	Karina Moreira	Brazil	2:02:47.15	
	Carolina Sarapura	Bolivia	DNS	
	Jessica Hancco	Peru	DNS	

=== High jump ===
September 24

Rank	Name	Nationality	1.55	1.60	1.65	1.70	1.73	1.76	1.79	Result	Notes
1st place, gold medalist(s)	Lorena Aires	Uruguay	–	–	–	o	o	o	xxx	1.76	
2nd place, silver medalist(s)	Julia Cristina Silva	Brazil	–	–	o	o	o	xxo	xxx	1.76	
3rd place, bronze medalist(s)	María Fernanda Murillo	Colombia	–	o	o	xo	o	xo	xxx	1.76	
4	Catalina Ossa	Chile	o	o	xo	o	xo	xxx		1.73	
5	Mishelle Sanchez	Ecuador	–	o	xo	xxx				1.65	
6	Nicola Torres	Chile	–	o	xxo	xxx				1.65	
7	Alejandra Arévalo	Peru	o	o	xxx					1.60	

=== Pole vault ===
September 24

Rank	Name	Nationality	3.00	3.15	3.30	3.45	3.60	3.70	3.80	3.90	Result	Notes
1st place, gold medalist(s)	Juliana Campos	Brazil	–	–	–	–	o	o	o	xo	3.90	
2nd place, silver medalist(s)	Noelina Madarieta	Argentina	–	–	–	–	xo	xxo	xo	xxx	3.80	
2nd place, silver medalist(s)	Ana Quiñonez	Ecuador	–	–	o	o	xxo	xo	xo	xxx	3.80	
4	Fernanda Carabias	Chile	–	–	o	o	xo	o	xxx		3.70	
5	Alejandra Arévalo	Peru	–	–	–	–	xo	xo	xxx		3.70	
6	Gina Lucero	Peru	o	o	o	xxx					3.30	

=== Long jump ===
September 24

Rank	Name	Nationality	Result	Notes
1st place, gold medalist(s)	Claudine Paola de Jesus	Brazil	5.95	
2nd place, silver medalist(s)	Macarena Borie	Chile	5.69	
3rd place, bronze medalist(s)	Alejandra Arévalo	Peru	5.60	
4	Adriana Chila	Ecuador	5.57	

=== Triple jump ===
September 23

Rank	Name	Nationality	Result	Notes
1st place, gold medalist(s)	Claudine Paola de Jesus	Brazil	13.12	
2nd place, silver medalist(s)	Adriana Chila	Ecuador	13.09	
3rd place, bronze medalist(s)	Valeria Quispe	Bolivia	12.74	
4	Jenifer Canchingre	Ecuador	12.69	
5	Lizel Gomez	Paraguay	12.57	NR

=== Shot put ===
September 24

Rank	Name	Nationality	Result	Notes
1st place, gold medalist(s)	Izabela da Silva	Brazil	16.25	
2nd place, silver medalist(s)	Yerlin Mesa	Colombia	15.13	
3rd place, bronze medalist(s)	Grace Conley	Bolivia	14.87	
4	Ailen Armada	Argentina	14.14	
5	Dayna Toledo	Chile	14.03	
6	Jessica Molina	Ecuador	13.67	
7	Lubia Asencio	Peru	13.19	
8	Catalina Bravo	Chile	12.23	
9	Ginger Quintero	Ecuador	11.72	

=== Discus throw ===
September 25

Rank	Name	Nationality	#1	#2	#3	#4	#5	#6	Result	Notes
1st place, gold medalist(s)	Izabela da Silva	Brazil	44.72	x	48.78	53.04	51.48	52.09	53.04	
2nd place, silver medalist(s)	Ailen Armada	Argentina	47.32	43.90	45.63	46.33	51.24	49.09	51.24	
3rd place, bronze medalist(s)	Lara Capurro	Argentina	44.39	41.98	46.27	x	45.94	44.66	46.27	
4	Catalina Bravo	Chile	40.82	42.62	44.11	x	x	x	44.11	
5	Claudia Escobar	Chile	x	42.70	x	40.00	42.66	43.66	43.56	
6	Lubia Asencio	Peru	x	29.15	32.28	30.46	x	x	32.28	
	Jenny Mina	Ecuador							DNS	

=== Hammer throw ===
September 24

Rank	Name	Nationality	Result	Notes
1st place, gold medalist(s)	Mayra Gaviria	Colombia	61.55	
2nd place, silver medalist(s)	Paola Miranda	Paraguay	59.54	
3rd place, bronze medalist(s)	Ana Bayer	Brazil	56.39	
4	Mariana García	Chile	55.61	
5	Ana María Vasquez	Peru	54.20	
6	Jenny Mina	Ecuador	53.81	
7	Katherine Ayovi	Ecuador	49.32	

=== Javelin throw ===
September 23

Rank	Name	Nationality	Result	Notes
1st place, gold medalist(s)	Edivania Araújo	Brazil	55.94	
2nd place, silver medalist(s)	Laura Aredes	Paraguay	50.91	
3rd place, bronze medalist(s)	Valentina Salazar	Chile	49.23	
4	María Mello	Uruguay	48.69	
5	Dominella Arias	Argentina	47.24	
6	Jimena Gómez	Peru	45.56	
7	Ayra Valdivia	Peru	42.79	

=== Heptathlon ===
September 24–25

The highest mark recorded in each event is highlighted in yellow

Rank	Athlete	Nationality	100m H	HJ	SP	200m	LJ	JT	800m	Points	Notes
1st place, gold medalist(s)	Fiorella Chiappe	Argentina	14.08	1.67	11.09	25.55	5.39	35.17	2:30.76	5149	
2nd place, silver medalist(s)	Martina Corra	Argentina	14.62	1.55	11.97	25.38	5.17	40.12	2:30.66	5042	
3rd place, bronze medalist(s)	Karen Lopes	Brazil	14.45	1.55	10.97	25.50	5.36	40.12	2:33.40	5009	
4	Javiera Brahm	Chile	14.55	1.43	11.90	25.78	5.34	28.16	2:31.41	4685	
5	Jenifer Canchingre	Ecuador	15.31	1.49	11.19	26.72	5.29	35.91	2:41.91	4534	
6	Kimberly Cardoza	Peru	15.26	1.58	10.27	25.95	5.01	NM	2:24.63	4193	
