= 2016 South American Under-23 Championships in Athletics =

VII South American Under-23 Championships in Athletics
- Dates: 23–25 September
- Host city: Lima, Peru
- Venue: Villa Deportiva Nacional (VIDENA)
- Level: Under-23
- Events: 44
- Participation: 237 athletes from 10 nations
- Records set: 3 championship records

The 2016 South American Under-23 Championships in Athletics was the seventh edition of the biennial track and field competition for South American athletes aged under 23 years old, organised by CONSUDATLE. The tournament was held in Lima, Peru at the Villa Deportiva Nacional between 23 and 25 September.

Brazil was the dominant nation, winning 19 gold medals in its haul of 33. Colombia placed second with eight golds among its 22 medals. Ecuador and Peru were the next most successful nations. Brazilian sprinter Rodrigo do Nascimento was the most successful athlete of the tournament, taking four gold medals across the 100 metres, 200 metres, and relay races. Three other athletes won two individual gold medals, all of them women; María Pía Fernández took a middle-distance double for Uruguay, while Claudine Gimenes won a horizontal jumps double and Izabela da Silva a shot/discus double for Brazil.

== Medal summary ==
=== Men ===
Event	Gold		Silver		Bronze	
100 metres (wind:-1.4 m/s)	Rodrigo do Nascimento (BRA)	10.21 CR	Jhonny Rentería (COL)	10.41	Ricardo de Souza (BRA)	10.47
200 metres (wind:0.0 m/s)	Rodrigo do Nascimento (BRA)	21.20	Fredy Maidana (PAR)	21.36	Gabriel Constantino (BRA)	21.42
400 metres	Alexander Russo (BRA)	47.07	Sergio Aldea (CHI)	47.74	Josué Congo (ECU)	48.09
800 metres	Leandro Paris (ARG)	1:48.31	Jelssin Robledo (COL)	1:48.85	Cristhian Castro (PER)	1:51.88
1500 metres	Rafael Vicente Loza (ECU)	3:56.37	Carlos Maturana (CHI)	3:56.66	Wellerson Falcão Vivi (BRA)	3:56.84
5000 metres	Daniel Ferreira do Nascimento (BRA)	14:27.78	Walter Ñaupa (PER)	14:28.06	Yuri Labra (PER)	14:29.81
10,000 metres	Jhordan Ccope (PER)	30:01.18	Mauricio Díaz (PER)	30:01.58	Vidal Basco (BOL)	30:05.63
110 metres hurdles (wind:+0.4 m/s)	Gabriel Constantino (BRA)	14.10	Juan Carlos Moreno (COL)	14.10	Mauricio Garrido (PER)	14.45
400 metres hurdles	Márcio Teles (BRA)	52.31	Steeven Medina (ECU)	52.98	Diego Courbis (CHI)	53.51
3000 metres steeplechase	Daniel Ferreira do Nascimento (BRA)	9:05.40	Walter Ñaupa (PER)	9:13.84	Gerson Montes (ECU)	9:21.95
4 × 100 m relay	Brazil (BRA); Derick Silva; Rodrigo do Nascimento; Gabriel Constantino; Ricardo de Souza	39.86	Colombia (COL); Juan Carlos Moreno; Deivi Díaz; Jhonny Rentería; Raúl Mena	40.70	Argentina (ARG); Juan Ulián; Leonel Carrizo; Daniel Londero; Gastón Sayago	41.74
4 × 400 m relay	Brazil (BRA); Rodrigo do Nascimento; Márcio Teles; Rafael Francisco; Alexander Russo	3:13.73	Ecuador (ECU); Jean Jacome; Carlos Peraza; Steeven Medina; Ian Corozo	3:17.23	Argentina (ARG); Leonel Carrizo; Sergio Pandiani; Juan Ulián; Leandro Paris	3:17.91
20 km walk	Iván Garrido (COL)	1:24:41.22	Kenny Martín Pérez (COL)	1:25:18.00	Paolo Yurivilca (PER)	1:25:18.13
High jump	Fernando Ferreira (BRA)	2.20 m	Daniel Córtez (COL)	2.17 m	Jaime Escobar (PAN)	2.00 m
Pole vault	José Rodolfo Pacho (ECU)	5.10 m	Bruno Spinelli (BRA)	5.00 m	Josué Gutiérrez (PER)	4.90 m
Long jump	Higor Alves (BRA)	7.80 m	Raúl Mena (COL)	7.61 m	Eduardo Landaeta (ECU)	7.39 m
Triple jump	Álvaro Cortez (CHI)	15.91 m	Randy Hood (CHI)	15.75 m	Mateus de Sá (BRA)	15.54 m
Shot put	Willian Dourado (BRA)	18.99 m	Daniel Castillo (CHI)	16.40 m	Sebastián Lazen (CHI)	16.39 m
Discus throw	Mauricio Ortega (COL)	57.60 m	Douglas dos Reis (BRA)	52.76 m	José Miguel Ballivian (CHI)	51.83 m
Hammer throw	Humberto Mansilla (CHI)	72.67 m CR, NR	Joaquín Gómez (ARG)	71.56 m	Gabriel Kehr (CHI)	69.80 m
Javelin throw	Francisco Muse (CHI)	71.84 m	Giovanni Díaz (PAR)	70.89 m	Pedro Luiz Barros (BRA)	69.42 m
Decathlon	Andy Preciado (ECU)	7162 pts	Alex Soares (BRA)	7079 pts	Sergio Pandiani (ARG)	6968 pts

=== Women ===
Evento	Gold		Silver		Bronze	
100 metres (wind:0.0 m/s)	Evelyn Rivera (COL)	11.74	Khaterine Chillambo (ECU)	12.012	Javiera Cañas (CHI)	12.018
200 metres (wind:0.0 m/s)	Vitória Cristina Rosa (BRA)	23.95	Evelyn Rivera (COL)	24.01	Romina Cifuentes (ECU)	24.50
400 metres	Astrid Balanta (COL)	54.45	Eliana Chávez (COL)	54.48	Tania Caicedo (ECU)	56.08
800 metres	Pía Fernández (URU)	2:08.83	Johana Arrieta (COL)	2:09.76	Johanna Castro (CHI)	2:12.45
1500 metres	Pía Fernández (URU)	4:24.51	Zulema Arenas (PER)	4:25.46	Carmen Toquaiza (ECU)	4:26.87
5000 metres	Saida Meneses (PER)	16:34.66 CR	Irma Vila (BOL)	16:44.87	Carmen Toquaiza (ECU)	16:47.34
10,000 metres	Jesica Paguay (ECU)	35:10.63 CR	Saida Ramos (PER)	35:52.81	Sunilda Lozano (PER)	36:10.55
100 metres hurdles (wind:0.0 m/s)	Diana Bazalar (PER)	13.52 CR	Maribel Caicedo (ECU)	13.85	Natalia Pinzón (COL)	14.01
400 metres hurdles	Melissa Gonzalez (COL)	59.26	Dandaduea da Silva (BRA)	1:01.11	Virginia Villalba (ECU)	1:01.58
3000 metres steeplechase	Belén Casetta (ARG)	10:05.30 CR	Zulema Arenas (PER)	10:05.43	Rina Cjuro (PER)	10:26.51
4 × 100 m relay	Ecuador (ECU); Mariana Poroso; Romina Cifuentes; Katherine Chillambo; Maribel Caicedo	45.13	Brazil (BRA); Vitória Cristina Rosa; Tamiris de Liz; Mariana Ferreira; Evelyn de Paula	45.74	Peru (PER); Jimena Copara; Diana Bazalar; Mariana Macarachvili; Gabriela Delgado	47.72
4 × 400 m relay	Colombia (COL); Melissa Gonzalez; Evelyn Rivera; Natalia Pinzón; Astrid Balanta	3:42.19	Brazil (BRA); Daysiellen Dias; Tiffani Marinho; Karina da Rosa; Dandadeua da Silva	3:47.14	Ecuador (ECU); Virginia Villalba; Deyanira Ortiz; Coraima Cortez; Tania Caicedo	3:51.55
20 km walk	Sara Pulido (COL)	1:39:14.27	Leyde Guerra (PER)	1:40:29.49	Odeth Huanca (BOL)	1:41:18.28
High jump	Lorena Aires (URU)	1.76 m	Julia Cristina Silva (BRA)	1.76 m	María Fernanda Murillo (COL)	1.76 m
Pole vault	Juliana Campos (BRA)	3.90 m	Noelina Mandarieta (ARG); Ana Quiñonez (ECU)	3.80 m	Not awarded	
Long jump	Claudine Paola de Jesus (BRA)	5.95 m (wind:+0.4 m/s)	Macarena Borie (CHI)	5.69 m (wind:+0.4 m/s)	Alejandra Arévalo (PER)	5.60 m (wind:+0.4 m/s)
Triple jump	Claudine Paola de Jesus (BRA)	13.12 m (wind:+1.1 m/s)	Adriana Chila (ECU)	13.09 m (wind:+1.2 m/s)	Valeria Quispe (BOL)	12.74 m (wind:+1.0 m/s)
Shot put	Izabela da Silva (BRA)	16.25 m	Yerlin Mesa (COL)	15.13 m	Grace Conley (BOL)	14.87 m
Discus throw	Izabela da Silva (BRA)	53.04 m	Ailen Armada (ARG)	51.24 m	Lara Capurro (ARG)	46.27 m
Hammer throw	Mayra Gaviria (COL)	61.55 m	Paola Miranda (PAR)	59.54 m	Ana Bayer (BRA)	56.39 m
Javelin throw	Edivania Araújo (BRA)	55.94 m	Laura Paredes (PAR)	50.91 m	Valentina Salazar (CHI)	49.23 m
Heptathlon	Fiorella Chiappe (ARG)	5149 pts	Martina Corra (ARG)	5042 pts	Karen Lopes (BRA)	5009 pts

== Medal table ==
Rank	Nation	Gold	Silver	Bronze	Total
1	Brazil (BRA)	19	7	7	33
2	Colombia (COL)	8	12	2	22
3	Ecuador (ECU)	5	4	9	18
4	Peru (PER)	3	7	9	19
5	Chile (CHI)	3	5	8	16
6	Argentina (ARG)	3	4	4	11
7	Uruguay (URU)	3	0	0	3
8	Paraguay (PAR)	0	4	0	4
9	Bolivia (BOL)	0	1	4	5
10	Panama (PAN)	0	0	1	1
Totals (10 entries)		44	44	44	132

== Participation ==
Nations could enter up to two athletes per event, and one team per relay, with a squad limit of 85 athletes. Venezuela declined to participate as a result of the Venezuelan economic cris.

- Argentina (19)
- Bolivia (12)
- Brazil (40)
- Chile (35)
- Colombia (22)
- Ecuador (44)
- Panama (1)
- Paraguay (12)
- Peru (48)
- Uruguay (4)
