= Melissa González =

Melissa González may refer to:

- Melissa Gonzalez (hurdler) (born 1994), Colombian-American athlete
- Melissa González (field hockey) (born 1989), American field hockey player
