= Athletics at the 2017 Bolivarian Games =

Athletics at the XVIII Bolivarian Games
- Dates: 21–25 November
- Host city: Santa Marta, Colombia
- Venue: Bureche Athletics Stadium
- Level: Senior
- Events: 47 (24 men, 23 women)
- Participation: 277 athletes from 9 nations

Athletics (Spanish: Atletismo), for the 2017 Bolivarian Games, took place at the Bureche Athletics Stadium in Santa Marta, Colombia from 21 to 25 November. A total of 47 events were contested, divided between the sexes bar the men's 50 kilometres race walk.

The host nation, Colombia, topped the medal table (as it did in 2013) with 17 gold medals among a total of 52. Venezuela were the next most successful team, with 28 medals, 11 of them gold. Chile had the third highest number of winners, with six, while Ecuador was third on the total medal count with 21.

The most successful athlete of the competition was Venezuela's Nercely Soto, who won the women's 200 metres and 400 metres (defending her 2013 double) as well as taking gold in the 4 × 100 metres relay and bronze in the 4 × 400 metres relay. The prevented women' 100 metres champion Ángela Tenorio of Ecuador from multiple titles, as she finished as silver medallist in the 200 m and 4 × 100 m relay. Tenorio's compatriot Álex Quiñónez defended his men's 100 m and 200 m titles in record-breaking times however, as well as taking a relay bronze. Carlos Díaz of Chile took a distance double in the men's 1500 metres and 5000 metres, a feat matched on the women's side by Colombia's Muriel Coneo.

Inés Melchor won a third consecutive title in the 10,000 metres. Other women athletes who defended their 2013 titles were Gladys Tejeda (women's half marathon), Robeilys Peinado (pole vault), Karen Gallardo (discus throw), Rosa Rodríguez (hammer throw) and Flor Ruiz. Additionally on the men's side, José Peña defended his steeplechase title, Andrés Chocho the 50 km walk, and Jhon Murillo the triple jump.

== Medalists ==
=== Men ===
Event	Gold		Silver		Bronze	
100 m wind +1.6 m/s	Álex Quiñónez; Ecuador	10.13 GR	Diego Palomeque; Colombia	10.31	Jhonny Rentería; Colombia	10.44
200 m wind +1.3 m/s	Álex Quiñónez; Ecuador	20.27 GR	Bernardo Baloyes; Colombia	20.77	Luguelín Santos; Dominican Republic	20.95
400 m	Luguelín Santos; Dominican Republic	45.44	Jhon Perlaza; Colombia	45.80	Alberto Aguilar; Venezuela	46.68
800 m	Rafith Rodríguez; Colombia	1:46.84	Lucirio Antonio Garrido; Venezuela	1:48.12	Jelssin Robledo; Colombia	1:49.20
1500 m	Carlos Díaz; Chile	3:45.58	Freddy Espinosa; Colombia	3:46.24	Lucirio Antonio Garrido; Venezuela	3:47.92
5000 m	Carlos Díaz; Chile	14:02.92	Marvin Blanco; Venezuela	14:05.90	José Luis Rojas; Peru	14:07.48
10,000 m	Luis Ostos; Peru	28:56.95 GR	José Mauricio González; Colombia	29:36.29	Luis Alberto Orta; Venezuela	29:59.26
110 m hurdles	Javier McFarlane; Peru	13.72	Juan Moreno; Colombia	13.89	Yeison Rivas; Colombia	13.89
400 m hurdles	Yeison Rivas; Colombia	50.47	Emerson Alejandro Chalá; Ecuador	50.53	Wilson Bello; Venezuela	50.74
3000 m steeplechase	José Peña; Venezuela	8:39.99	Gerald Giraldo; Colombia	8:40.12	Andrés Camargo; Colombia	8:40.80
4 × 100 m relay	Venezuela; Alexis Nieves; Arturo Ramírez; Rafael Vásquez; Yeiker Mendoza	39.40	Colombia; Bernardo Baloyes; Diego Palomeque; Jhonny Rentería; Deivi Díaz	39.58	Ecuador; Álex Quiñónez; Anderson Quintero; Carlos Perlaza; Jhon Valencia	39.83
4 × 400 m relay	Colombia; Yilmar Herrera; Rafith Rodríguez; Jelssin Robledo; Jhon Perlaza	3:06.14	Venezuela; Alberto Aguilar; Kelvis Padrino; Luis Felipe Rodríguez; Omar Longart	3:06.32	Chile; Sergio Aldea; José Manuel Del Prado; Alejandro Francesco; Rafael Muñoz	3:10.29
Half marathon	Jeison Suárez; Colombia	1:06:53	Diego Colorado; Colombia	1:07:15	Segundo Jami; Ecuador	1:07:41
20 km walk	Manuel Esteban Soto; Colombia	1:26:32	Mauricio Arteaga; Ecuador	1:27:03	Éider Arévalo; Colombia	1:27:47
50 km walk	Andrés Chocho; Ecuador	4:14:20	Ronald Quispe; Bolivia	4:25:30	Claudio Villanueva; Ecuador	4:49:33
High jump	Eure Yáñez; Venezuela	2.24 m	Arturo Chávez; Peru	2.18 m	Alexander Bowen; Panama	2.15 m
Pole vault	Walter Viáfara; Colombia	5.25 m GR	José Pacho; Ecuador	5.20 m	Pablo Chaverra; Colombia	5.00 m
Long jump	Santiago Cova; Venezuela	7.81 m	Jorge McFarlane; Peru	7.65 m	Eddy Florián; Dominican Republic	7.50 m
Triple jump	Jhon Murillo; Colombia	16.16 m	Divie Murillo; Colombia	15.87 m	Santiago Cova; Venezuela	15.85 m
Shot put	Eder Moreno; Colombia	18.16 m	Jhon Zea; Colombia	17.92 m	Aldo Gonzáles; Bolivia	17.78 m
Discus throw	Juan Caicedo; Ecuador	57.99 m	José Miguel Ballivian; Chile	55.53 m	Claudio Romero; Chile	53.42 m
Hammer throw	Hevertt Álvarez; Chile	62.08 m	Elías Díaz; Colombia	61.49 m	Daniel Felipe Aguirre; Colombia	61.42 m
Javelin throw	Arley Ibargüen; Colombia	78.87 m GR	Dayron Márquez; Colombia	76.75 m	Billy Julio; Venezuela	70.77 m
Decathlon	José Lemos; Colombia	7827 pts GR	Óscar Campos; Venezuela	6972 pts	Georni Jaramillo; Venezuela	6745 pts

=== Women ===
Event	Gold		Silver		Bronze	
100 m	Ángela Tenorio; Ecuador	11.26	Narcisa Landazuri; Ecuador	11.30	Andrea Purica; Venezuela	11.53
200 m	Nercely Soto; Venezuela	22.89	Ángela Tenorio; Ecuador	23.63	Narcisa Landazuri; Ecuador	23.65
400 m	Nercely Soto; Venezuela	52.43	Jennifer Padilla; Colombia	53.43	María Fernanda Mackenna; Chile	54.05
800 m	Rosangelica Escobar; Colombia	2:03.41	Andrea Calderón; Ecuador	2:04.00	Johana Arrieta; Colombia	2:04.61
1500 m	Muriel Coneo; Colombia	4:15.61	Rosibel García; Colombia	4:18.35	Zulema Arenas; Peru	4:19.03
5000 m	Muriel Coneo; Colombia	16:08.29	Carmen Toaquiza; Ecuador	16:13.49	Saida Meneses; Peru	16:13.80
10,000 m	Inés Melchor; Peru	33:57.13	Luz Mery Rojas; Peru	33:59.58	Carmen Martínez; Paraguay	34:07.14
100 m hurdles	Genesis Romero; Venezuela	13.19	Eliecith Palacios; Colombia	13.42	Maribel Caicedo; Ecuador	13.46
400 m hurdles	Julieth Caballero; Colombia	58.04	Gianna Woodruff; Panama	58.06	Melissa Gonzalez; Colombia	58.14
3000 m steeplechase	Zulema Arenas; Peru	9:52.32	Rolanda Bell; Panama	10:08.56	Andrea Ferris; Panama	10:09.05
4 × 100 m relay	Venezuela; Nediam Vargas; Andrea Purica; Génesis Romero; Nercely Soto	44.15	Ecuador; Maribel Caicedo; Narcisa Landazuri; Marina Poroso; Ángela Tenorio	45.15	Colombia; Melissa Gonzalez; Eliecith Palacios; Darlenys Obregón; Eliana Chávez	45.96
4 × 400 m relay	Chile; Paula Goñi; Carmen Mansilla; María Fernanda Mackenna; María José Echeverria	3:37.93	Colombia; Eliana Chávez; Johana Arrieta; Julieth Caballero; Rosangelica Escobar	3:38.49	Venezuela; Pamela Milano; Ydanis Navas; María Simancas; Nercely Soto	3:40.81
Half marathon	Gladys Tejeda; Peru	1:14:55	Angie Orjuela; Colombia	1:15:09	Diana Landi; Ecuador	1:17:23
20 km walk	Sandra Arenas; Colombia	1:32:39 GR	Kimberly García; Peru	1:33:07	Ángela Castro; Bolivia	1:34:05
High jump	María Fernanda Murillo; Colombia	1.78 m	Amanda Vergara; Venezuela	1.78 m	Joice Micolta; Ecuador	1.78 m
Pole vault	Robeilys Peinado; Venezuela	4.20 m	Katherine Castillo; Colombia	4.00 m	Carmen Villanueva; Venezuela	4.00 m
Long jump	Nathalee Aranda; Panama	6.46 m	Macarena Reyes; Chile	6.34 m	Paola Mautino; Peru	6.25 m
Triple jump	Ana José Tima; Dominican Republic	13.50 m	Mirian Isabel Reyes; Peru	13.20 m	Valeria Quispe; Bolivia	13.17 m
Shot put	Natalia Duco; Chile	17.99 m	Sandra Lemos; Colombia	17.87 m	Ahymara Espinoza; Venezuela	16.57 m
Discus throw	Karen Gallardo; Chile	55.73 m	Aixa Middleton; Panama	54.74 m	Johana Martínez; Colombia	53.67 m
Hammer throw	Rosa Rodríguez; Venezuela	66.31 m	Johana Moreno; Colombia	62.17 m	Maryuri Orozco; Colombia	61.92 m
Javelin throw	Flor Ruiz; Colombia	62.48 m	Estefany Chacón; Venezuela	54.88 m	María Lucelly Murillo; Colombia	54.66 m
Heptathlon	Luisarys Toledo; Venezuela	5785 pts	Martha Araújo; Colombia	5703 pts	Joice Micolta; Ecuador	5154 pts

== Medal table ==
* Host nation (Colombia)

Rank	Nation	Gold	Silver	Bronze	Total
1	Colombia (COL)*	17	22	13	52
2	Venezuela (VEN)	11	6	11	28
3	Chile (CHI)	6	2	3	11
4	Ecuador (ECU)	5	8	8	21
5	Peru (PER)	5	5	4	14
6	Dominican Republic (DOM)	2	0	2	4
7	Panama (PAN)	1	3	2	6
8	Bolivia (BOL)	0	1	3	4
9	Paraguay (PAR)	0	0	1	1
Totals (9 entries)		47	47	47	141

== Participating nations ==
- Bolivia (23)
- Chile (26)
- Colombia (67)
- Dominican Republic (4)
- Ecuador (37)
- Panama (14)
- Paraguay (12)
- Peru (46)
- Venezuela (48)
