= Douglas dos Reis =

Brazilian discus thrower (born 1995)

Personal information
- Full name: Douglas Junior dos Reis
- Born: December 9, 1995 (age 30)
- Education: São Paulo State University
- Height: 1.88 m (6 ft 2 in)
- Weight: 98 kg (216 lb)

Sport
- Sport: Athletics
- Event: Discus throw

Douglas Junior dos Reis (born 9 December 1995) is a Brazilian athlete specialising in the discus throw. He has won several medals at regional level.

His personal best in the event is 59.90 metres set in São Bernardo do Campo in 2017.

== International competitions ==
Year	Competition	Venue	Position	Event	Notes
Representing Brazil
2016	South American U23 Championships	Lima, Peru	2nd	Discus throw	52.76 m
2017	South American Championships	Asunción, Paraguay	3rd	Discus throw	58.83 m
2017	Universiade	Taipei, Taiwan	7th	Discus throw	59.37 m
2018	South American Games	Cochabamba, Bolivia	4th	Discus throw	51.76 m
2018	Ibero-American Championships	Trujillo, Peru	3rd	Discus throw	56.91 m
2019	South American Championships	Lima, Peru	2nd	Discus throw	56.43 m
2022	Ibero-American Championships	La Nucía, Spain	7th	Discus throw	53.21 m
2024	Ibero-American Championships	Cuiabá, Brazil	8th	Discus throw	57.79 m
2025	South American Championships	Mar del Plata, Argentina	6th	Discus throw	56.60 m
2026	Ibero-American Championships	Lima, Peru	6th	Discus throw	61.39 m
