= David Blough =

American football player and coach (born 1995)

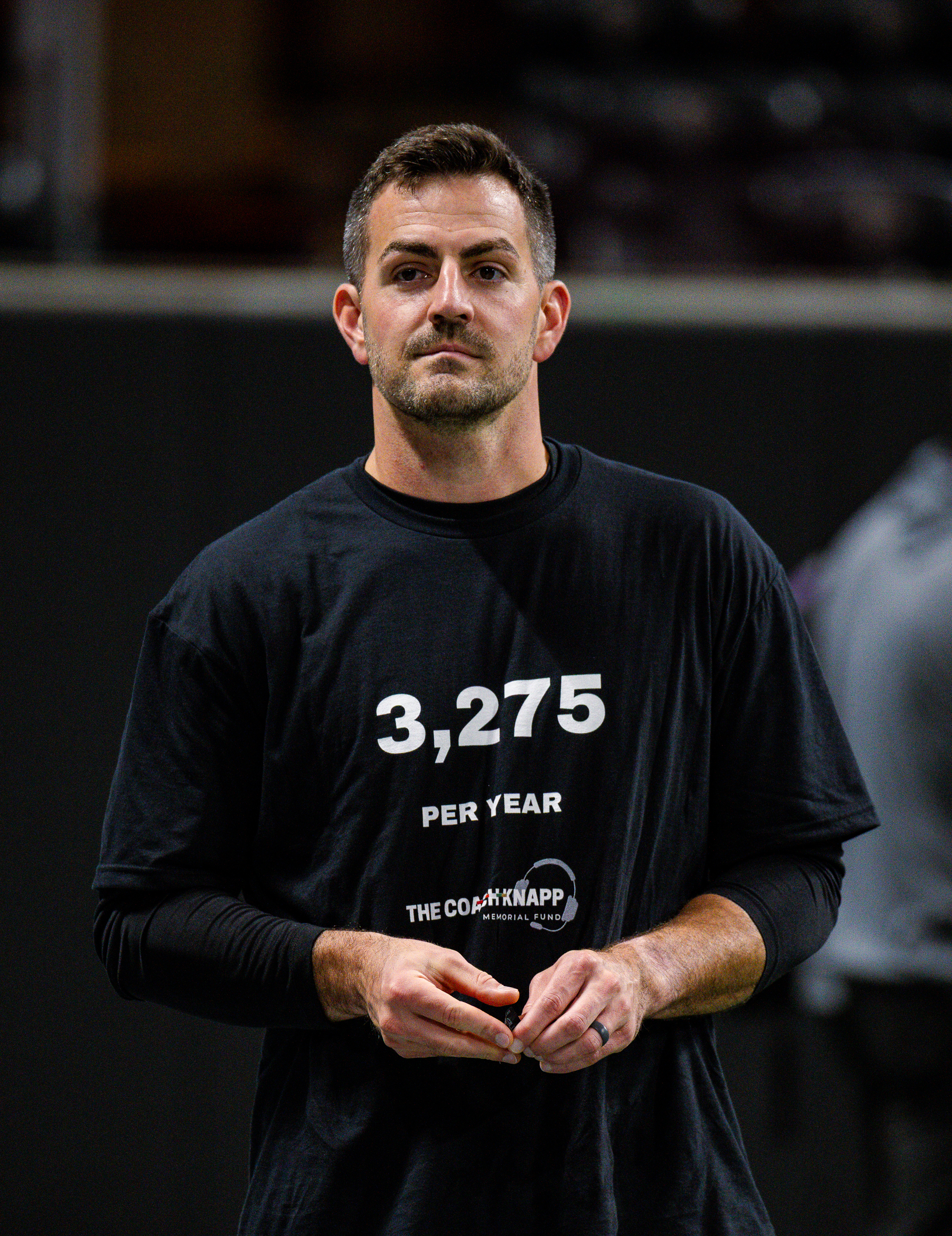
- Blough in 2025

Washington Commanders
- Title: Offensive coordinator

Personal information
- Born: July 31, 1995 (age 31); Carrollton, Texas, U.S.
- Listed height: 6 ft 1 in (1.85 m)
- Listed weight: 207 lb (94 kg)

Career information
- Position: Quarterback (No. 10, 17)
- High school: Creekview (Carrollton)
- College: Purdue (2014–2018)
- NFL draft: 2019: undrafted

Career history

Playing
- Cleveland Browns (2019)*; Detroit Lions (2019–2021); Minnesota Vikings (2022)*; Arizona Cardinals (2022); Detroit Lions (2023)*
- * Offseason or practice squad member only

Coaching
- Washington Commanders (2024–present); Assistant quarterbacks coach (2024–2025); Offensive coordinator (2026–present)

Awards and highlights
- Third-team All-Big Ten (2018)

Career NFL statistics
- Passing attempts: 242
- Passing completions: 138
- Completion percentage: 57%
- TD–INT: 6–9
- Passing yards: 1,435
- Passer rating: 67.1
- Stats at Pro Football Reference
- Coaching profile at Pro Football Reference

David Marshall Blough (born July 31, 1995) is an American professional football coach and former quarterback who is the offensive coordinator for the Washington Commanders of the National Football League (NFL). Blough played college football for the Purdue Boilermakers and played with the NFL's Cleveland Browns, Detroit Lions, Minnesota Vikings, and Arizona Cardinals.

Blough began coaching in 2024 with the Commanders as an assistant quarterbacks coach and was promoted to offensive coordinator in 2026. He is married to Colombian American hurdler Melissa Gonzalez and is the brother-in-law of NFL cornerback Christian Gonzalez.

== Early life ==
Blough was born on July 31, 1995, in Carrollton, Texas. Blough is the youngest of three brothers; his elder brothers are Matthew and Daniel. He played high school football for Creekview in Carrollton, Texas. As a high-school athlete, he was being recruited by Purdue, Memphis, and New Mexico State after a junior season in which he completed 56 percent of his passes for 1,777 yards and 17 touchdowns against just three interceptions. He also ran for 244 yards and six scores.

Blough was rated as the seventh-best pocket passer quarterback in the class of 2014, according to ESPN during The Opening rankings, but was later rated as the thirty-fifth best pocket passer. Other ratings services also had Blough in their class of 2014 rankings: 19 by Rivals.com and 26 by Scout.com following his reclassification. Blough participated in the 2013 Elite 11 quarterback skills competition.

== Playing career ==
=== College ===
==== 2014 ====
In May 2013, Blough received a scholarship offer, and verbally committed to play college football at Purdue University following his visit on June 15, 2013. On December 16, 2013, he signed his National Letter of Intent. In January 2014, he enrolled early at Purdue. He attended Purdue's spring camp in April 2014 under coach Darrell Hazell. Blough redshirted his entire freshman season for the 2014 Boilermakers as sophomore Danny Etling was named the team's starter.

==== 2015 ====
As a redshirt freshman for the Purdue Boilermakers, Blough began the season as a backup to Austin Appleby. Blough was the backup on a roster that had just three scholarship quarterbacks, the other being true freshman Elijah Sindelar, who was recovering from a high school knee injury, and who Hazell wanted to redshirt.

Blough made his Purdue debut on September 12, 2015, throwing one incomplete pass in a three-and-out series in the closing minutes of a victory over Indiana State. Hazell ultimately decided to redshirt Sindelar during the 2015 season, resulting in Blough seeing playing time as Appleby's principal backup. Blough completed three passes in seven attempts against Virginia Tech on September 19.

On September 22, Blough was named Purdue's starting quarterback, replacing Appleby. Blough completed 29 of his 39 passing attempts for 340 yards and a pair of touchdowns, but the Boilermakers fell 28–35 to the Bowling Green Falcons. In his second career start, Blough led the Boilermakers to a near-upset of #2 Michigan State. Blough had completed 13 of 23 passes with a touchdown and an interception when Purdue received the ball with 2:51 minutes left in the game with Purdue down 3 points. Blough finished the final drive 2 for 8, including three straight incomplete passes to end Purdue's hopes at an upset. In his fifth start on October 31 against Nebraska, Blough completed 28 of 43 passes for 274 yards with four touchdown passes and no interceptions while also running for 82 yards and a touchdown to earn Big Ten Offensive Player of the Week honors. On November 14, Blough completed 26 of 45 passes for 287 yards with a touchdown and an interceptions as Purdue was narrowly defeated by #24 Northwestern. Blough started the following game, hoping to lead the Boilermakers to an upset of #6 Iowa, but he was injured during the first quarter of the game. Two day later it was announced Blough had suffered a concussion and was ruled out against the Indiana. Blough finished his redshirt freshman season with 169 completions in 293 attempts, eight interceptions, ten touchdown passes, 1,574 passing yards, and a 57% completion percentage.

==== 2016 ====
Purdue's 2016 spring practice featured a quarterback battle between Blough and redshirt freshman Elijah Sindelar. After spring practice, press reports indicated that Blough was leading the competition. Blough and Sindelar were the starters in the spring game. Blough passed for 226 yards but was intercepted twice as his team was defeated 17–23.

On August 22, 2016, Blough was named the starting quarterback. In the opening game, Blough led Purdue to a 45–24 victory over Eastern Kentucky. On Purdue's first drive, Blough found Tario Fuller on a screen pass for a 27-yard gain. For the game, he completed 25 of 43 passes for 245 yards with a touchdown pass and an interception while also running for two touchdowns. In his third start of the season on September 24 against Nevada, Blough completed 21 of 30 passes for 300 yards with two touchdown passes and one interception to rally Purdue to a 24–14 victory. On October 8, Blough's fourth quarter pass to Cameron Posey against Illinois set up a game-tying touchdown run by Richie Worship for Purdue first win against Illinois since the 2014 Boilermakers beat the 2014 Fighting Illini. After leading Purdue to a 3–2 start, Blough and Purdue lost to Iowa 49–35 on October 15, throwing a career high five touchdowns. The loss lead to head coach Darrell Hazell's dismissal. On November 5, Blough almost knocked off Minnesota on the road. He posted 4 touchdowns, but had 1 interception in the loss. Following the season, Blough was an honorable mention All-Big Ten selection by the coaches.

==== 2017 ====
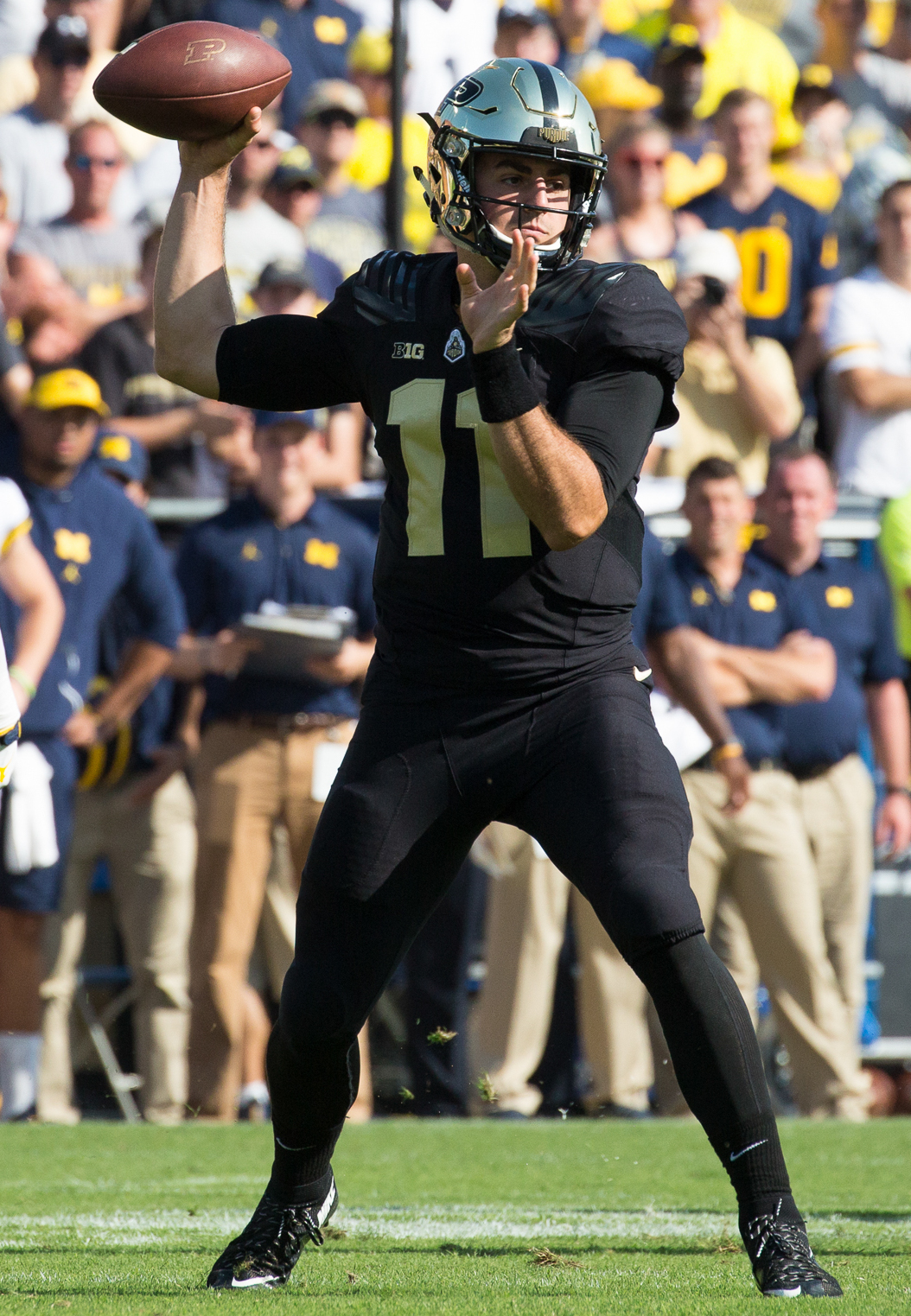
Blough with the Purdue Boilermakers in 2017

Blough once again entered training camp in a quarterback battle, with his primary competition being redshirt sophomore Elijah Sindelar and redshirt freshman Jared Sparks. Blough was injured during Purdue's scrimmage on August 12, 2017, but was not expected to miss the season opener. Blough began the season opener against #16 Louisville Cardinals as the backup to Sindelar. Blough came in during the second quarter and sparked the struggling Purdue offense, leading two touchdown drives to give Purdue the lead and increase their lead. However, late in the third Blough was intercepted twice, one of which being a 61-yard touchdown for Louisville. Blough returned to the bench for the rest of the game in favor of Sindelar. Blough finished the game with 175 passing yards. On September 8, Blough completed six of seven attempts in the first half for 174 yards and 2 touchdowns. He finished the game 11-for-13 passing for 235 yards and three scores. This would have been considered a perfect passer rating by NFL standards.

==== 2018 ====
Purdue's first game of the season was against Northwestern and Elijah Sindelar was named as the starting quarterback. Sindelar was named the starter for third game of the season against Missouri, but he was injured the Wednesday before the game. Blough was named the starter after the injury announcement. The team was 0–2 when he took over.

On September 15, 2018, against Missouri, Blough threw for a school record 572 passing yards. He set the Big Ten record for total yards with 590. He was named the Big Ten offensive player of the week. Despite Blough's performance, Purdue lost 40–37.

Purdue played at Illinois October 13. Since Illinois was the team he was playing when he got hurt the previous year, Blough said the game "...was personal." Purdue routed Illinois 46–7. Blough was pulled from the game due to their lead, but accumulated 377 yards passing and three touchdowns with one interception. He also had his first career receiving touchdown.

Purdue played #2 Ohio State on October 20. Purdue won 49–20 in a surprising upset. Blough threw for 378 yards and three touchdowns in the game.

His last game at Purdue ended in a blowout loss to Auburn in the 2018 Music City Bowl. Auburn led 56–7 and finished the game 63–14, the most points scored against Purdue in their history.

He played in the East-West Shrine Bowl. He finished the game 10–15 with two touchdowns and 149 yards.

=== National Football League ===
Pre-draft measurables
| Height | Weight | Arm length | Hand span | Wingspan | 40-yard dash | 10-yard split | 20-yard split | 20-yard shuttle | Three-cone drill | Vertical jump | Broad jump |
|---|---|---|---|---|---|---|---|---|---|---|---|
| 6 ft 0 1/4 in (1.84 m) | 200 lb (91 kg) | 29 5/8 in (0.75 m) | 9 3/8 in (0.24 m) | 6 ft 2 in (1.88 m) | 4.91 s | 1.66 s | 2.82 s | 4.55 s | 7.22 s | 31.5 in (0.80 m) | 8 ft 11 in (2.72 m) |
All values from Pro Day

==== Cleveland Browns ====
Blough was signed by the Cleveland Browns as an undrafted free agent on May 3, 2019.

==== Detroit Lions ====
On August 30, 2019, Blough was traded to the Detroit Lions in an exchange that also saw the teams swap conditional seventh-round draft picks. On November 27, 2019, following injuries to Matthew Stafford and backup quarterback Jeff Driskel, Blough was named the starting quarterback for the Lions for their game on Thanksgiving Day against the Chicago Bears, making it his first NFL start. Blough completed the game with 22 completed passes on 38 attempts for 280 yards with two touchdowns and an interception but the Lions lost 24–20. During the game he threw for his first NFL completion on a 75-yard touchdown pass to Lions wide receiver Kenny Golladay. In Week 14 at the Minnesota Vikings, Blough threw for 205 yards with one touchdown and two interceptions and was sacked five times in a 20–7 Lions loss. In Week 15 against the Tampa Bay Buccaneers Blough threw for 260 yards and 2 interceptions, one returned for a touchdown, in a 38–17 Lions loss. In Week 16, against the Denver Broncos Blough threw for 117 yards and a touchdown in a 27–17 Lions loss. In Week 17 against the Green Bay Packers, Blough threw for 122 yards and an interception and caught a 19-yard touchdown pass from wide receiver Danny Amendola during the 23–20 loss. Blough finished the 2019 NFL season going 94-of-174 throwing for 984 yards with four touchdowns and six interceptions.

On September 5, 2020, Blough was waived by the Lions and signed to the practice squad the next day. He was promoted to the active roster on October 17.

On March 17, 2022, Blough re-signed with the Lions. On August 31, after making the initial 53-man roster, the Lions released Blough to make room for Nate Sudfeld.

==== Minnesota Vikings ====
On September 1, 2022, the Vikings signed Blough to their practice squad.

==== Arizona Cardinals ====
On December 14, 2022, Blough was signed off the Vikings practice squad to the Arizona Cardinals active roster. On December 30, Blough was named the starting quarterback for Week 17 against the Atlanta Falcons after Colt McCoy experienced a recurrence of concussion symptoms.In his final game as a Cardinal, Blough would throw a 77-yard touchdown flea-flicker to WR A. J. Green.

He re-signed with the team on March 20, 2023. On August 29, Blough was released by the Cardinals as part of final roster cuts before the start of the season.

==== Detroit Lions (second stint) ====
On August 31, 2023, Blough was signed to the Lions practice squad.

== Coaching career ==
On February 15, 2024, Blough was hired by the Washington Commanders as their assistant quarterbacks coach under head coach Dan Quinn, reuniting with offensive coordinator Kliff Kingsbury who was his head coach while playing for the Cardinals. During the 2025 offseason, the New York Jets requested to interview him for a opening on new head coach Aaron Glenn's staff, which the Commanders denied the request. Blough served the final four games of the 2025 season as the interim quarterbacks coach after Tavita Pritchard was hired as the head coach for the Stanford Cardinal. On January 10, 2026, Blough was promoted to offensive coordinator to fill the role filled by the departure of Kingsbury.

== Career statistics ==
=== NFL ===
| Year | Team | Games | | | Passing | | | | | | | | Rushing | | | |
| Year | Team | GP | GS | Record | Cmp | Att | Pct | Yds | Avg | TD | Int | Rtg | Att | Yds | Avg | TD |
|---|---|---|---|---|---|---|---|---|---|---|---|---|---|---|---|---|
| 2019 | DET | 5 | 5 | 0–5 | 94 | 174 | 54.0 | 984 | 5.7 | 4 | 6 | 64.0 | 8 | 31 | 3.9 | 0 |
| 2020 | DET | 1 | 0 | — | 6 | 10 | 60.0 | 49 | 4.9 | 0 | 1 | 32.9 | 1 | 18 | 18.0 | 0 |
| 2021 | DET | 1 | 0 | — | 0 | 0 | 0.0 | 0 | 0.0 | 0 | 0 | 0.0 | 1 | 6 | 6.0 | 0 |
| 2022 | ARI | 2 | 2 | 0–2 | 38 | 58 | 65.5 | 402 | 6.9 | 2 | 2 | 82.7 | 4 | 5 | 1.3 | 0 |
| 2023 | DET | 0 | 0 | DNP | | | | | | | | | | | | |
| Total | | 9 | 7 | 0–7 | 138 | 242 | 57.0 | 1,435 | 5.9 | 6 | 9 | 67.1 | 14 | 60 | 4.3 | 0 |

=== College ===
| Season | Team | Games | | | Passing | | | | | | | | Rushing | | | |
| Season | Team | GP | GS | Record | Cmp | Att | Pct | Yds | Y/A | TD | Int | Rtg | Att | Yds | Avg | TD |
|---|---|---|---|---|---|---|---|---|---|---|---|---|---|---|---|---|
| 2014 | Purdue | 0 | 0 | — | Redshirted (redshirt) | | | | | | | | | | | |
| 2015 | Purdue | 10 | 8 | 1–7 | 169 | 293 | 57.7 | 1,574 | 5.4 | 10 | 8 | 108.6 | 67 | 94 | 1.4 | 4 |
| 2016 | Purdue | 12 | 12 | 3–9 | 295 | 517 | 57.1 | 3,352 | 6.5 | 25 | 21 | 119.4 | 80 | 13 | 0.2 | 4 |
| 2017 | Purdue | 9 | 5 | 3–2 | 102 | 157 | 65.0 | 1,103 | 7.0 | 9 | 4 | 137.8 | 42 | 103 | 2.5 | 2 |
| 2018 | Purdue | 13 | 12 | 6–6 | 305 | 462 | 66.0 | 3,705 | 8.0 | 25 | 10 | 146.9 | 75 | 52 | 0.7 | 3 |
| Career | | 44 | 37 | 13–24 | 871 | 1,429 | 61.0 | 9,734 | 6.8 | 69 | 43 | 128.1 | 264 | 262 | 1.0 | 13 |

== Personal life ==
Blough is a Christian. He married Colombian American hurdler Melissa Gonzalez in March 2019; making him the brother-in-law of NFL cornerback Christian Gonzalez.
