= Leandro Paris =

Argentine middle-distance runner

Personal information
- Born: 16 February 1995 (age 30)

Sport
- Sport: Athletics
- Event: 800 metres

Leandro Ismael Paris Jimenez (born 16 February 1995) is an Argentine middle-distance runner competing primarily in the 800 metres. He represented his country in the 800 metres at the 2017 World Championships narrowly missing the semifinals. Additionally, he has won several medals at regional level.

== International competitions ==
Year	Competition	Venue	Position	Event	Notes
Representing Argentina
2012	South American Youth Championships	Mendoza, Argentina	5th	800 m	1:55.12
2013	South American Junior Championships	Resistencia, Argentina	6th	800 m	1:57.67
2014	South American U23 Championships	Montevideo, Uruguay	6th	800 m	1:52.23
2014	South American U23 Championships	Montevideo, Uruguay	5th	4 × 400 m relay	3:17.19
2016	Ibero-American Championships	Asunción, Paraguay	6th	800 m	1:51.53
2016	South American U23 Championships	Lima, Peru	1st	800 m	1:48.31
2016	South American U23 Championships	Lima, Peru	3rd	4 × 400 m relay	3:17.91
2017	South American Championships	Asunción, Paraguay	1st	800 m	1:49.82
2017	South American Championships	Asunción, Paraguay	5th	4 × 400 m relay	3:13.96
2017	World Championships	London, United Kingdom	25th (h)	800 m	1:47.09
2018	South American Games	Cochabamba, Bolivia	3rd	800 m	1:51.94
2021	South American Championships	Guayaquil, Ecuador	10th (h)	400 m	48.39
2023	South American Championships	São Paulo, Brazil	8th	800 m	1:49.18
2023	Pan American Games	Santiago, Chile	8th	4 × 400 m relay	3:15.69

== Personal bests ==
Outdoor

- 400 metres – 47.93 (Fresno 2017)
- 800 metres – 1:47.09 (London 2017)
