= Márcio Teles =

Brazilian hurdler

Marcio Teles
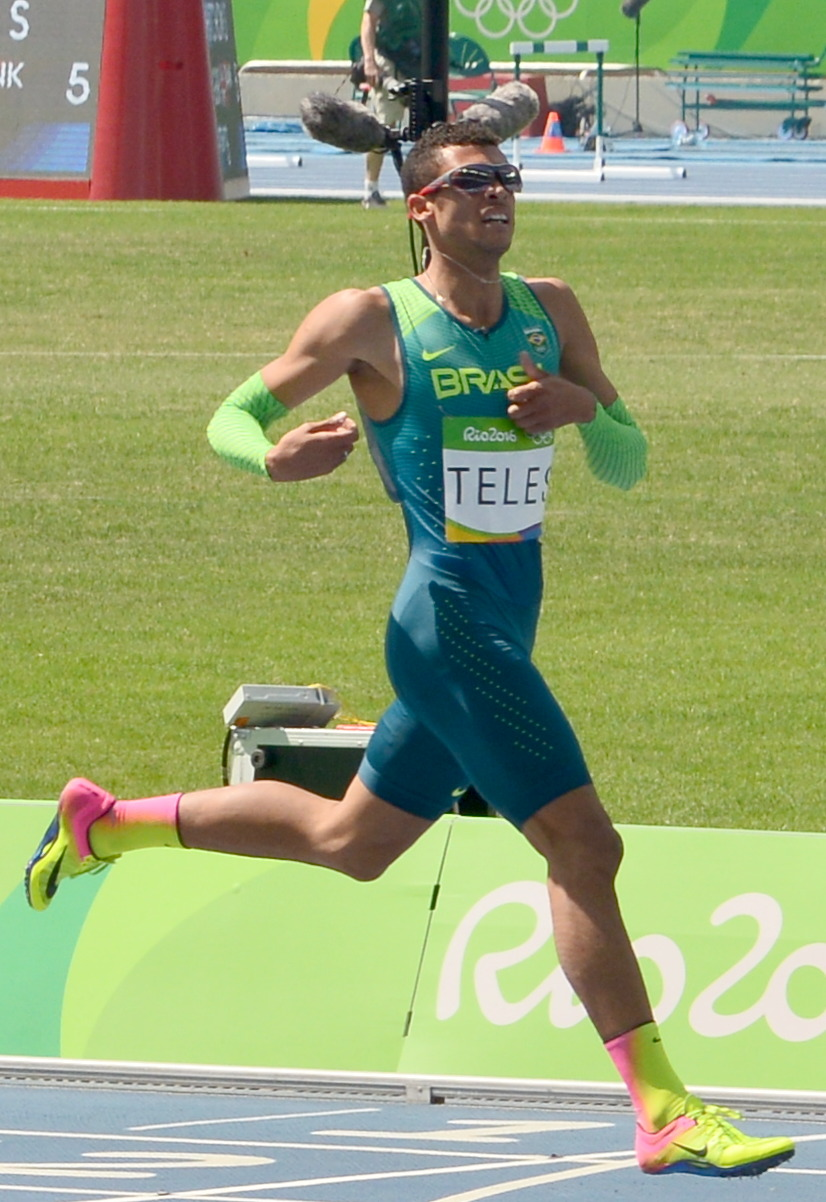
- Teles at the 2016 Olympics

Personal information
- Born: 27 January 1994 (age 32) Rio de Janeiro, Brazil
- Height: 1.80 m (5 ft 11 in)
- Weight: 68 kg (150 lb)

Sport
- Sport: Athletics
- Event: 400 m hurdles
- Club: BMF-Bovespa
- Coached by: Evandro Lázari

Achievements and titles
- Personal best: 48.60 (2019)

Marcio Soares Teles (born 27 January 1994) is a hurdlers runner from Brazil. He competed in the 400 m event at the 2016 Summer Olympics, but failed to reach the final.

He qualified to represent Brazil at the 2020 Summer Olympics.

== International competitions ==
| Year | Competition | Venue | Position | Event | Notes |
Representing Brazil
| 2016 | Ibero-American Championships | Rio de Janeiro, Brazil | 4th | 400 m hurdles | 49.67 |
| 2016 | Olympic Games | Rio de Janeiro, Brazil | 39th (h) | 400 m hurdles | 50.41 |
| 2016 | South American Games | Lima, Peru | 1st | 400 m hurdles | 52.31 |
| 2016 | South American Games | Lima, Peru | 1st | 4 × 400 m relay | 3:13.73 |
| 2017 | World Championships | London, United Kingdom | 6th (h) | 400 m hurdles | 49.41^{1} |
| 2018 | South American Games | Cochabamba, Bolivia | 3rd | 400 m hurdles | 49.78 |
| 2018 | Ibero-American Championships | Trujillo, Peru | 1st | 400 m hurdles | 49.64 |
| 2019 | World Championships | Doha, Qatar | 32nd (h) | 400 m hurdles | 51.02 |
| 2021 | Olympic Games | Tokyo, Japan | 24th (h) | 400 m hurdles | 49.70 |
| 2022 | Ibero-American Championships | La Nucía, Spain | 6th | 400 m hurdles | 51.50 |
| 2022 | South American Games | Asunción, Paraguay | 8th | 400 m hurdles | 54.48 |
| 2023 | South American Championships | São Paulo, Brazil | 4th | 400 m hurdles | 50.91 |
| 2023 | Pan American Games | Santiago, Chile | 7th | 400 m hurdles | 50.80 |
| 2024 | Ibero-American Championships | Cuiabá, Brazil | 10th (h) | 400 m hurdles | 52.24 |

^{1}Did not finish in the semifinals
