= Rodrigo do Nascimento =

Brazilian sprinter (born 1994)

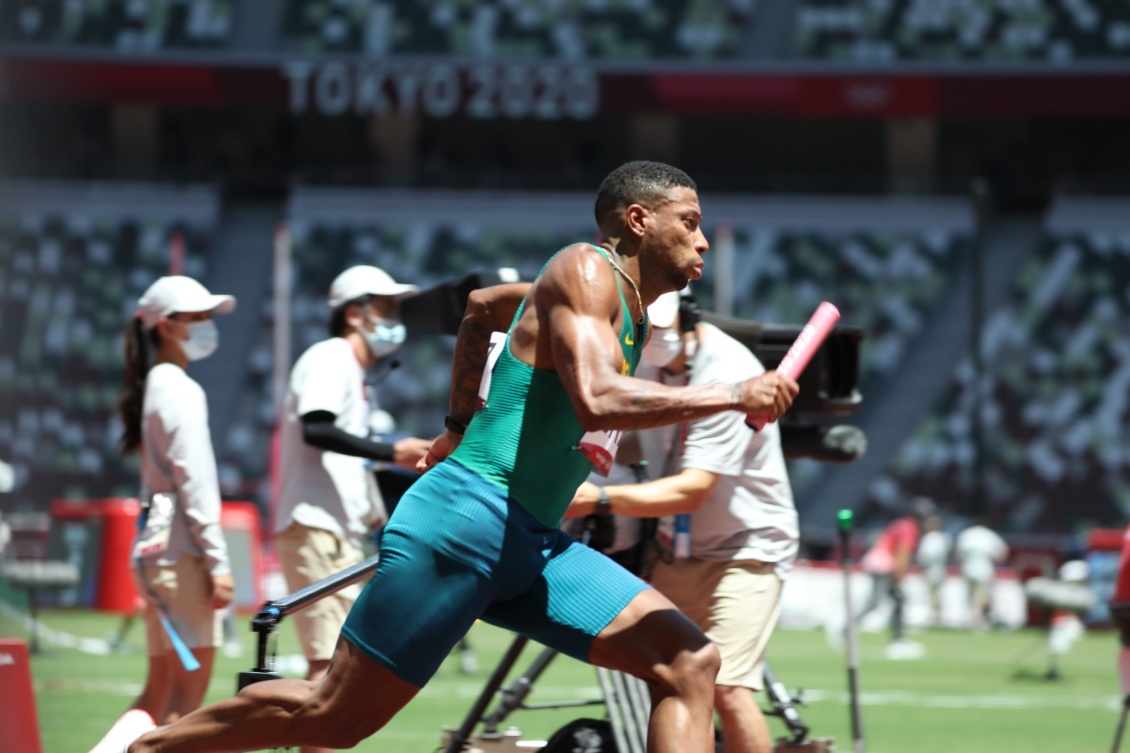
- Rodrigo do Nascimento at the 2020 Olympics

Personal information
- Full name: Rodrigo Pereira do Nascimento
- Born: September 26, 1994 (age 31) Itajaí, Brazil

Sport
- Sport: Athletics
- Events: 100 m, 200 m
Medal record
Men's athletics
Representing Brazil
World Relays
Gold medal – first place	2019 Yokohama	4×100 m relay
Pan American Games
Gold medal – first place	2019 Lima	4×100 m relay
Gold medal – first place	2023 Santiago	4×100 m relay

Rodrigo Pereira do Nascimento (born 26 September 1994) is a Brazilian sprinter. He won a gold medal in the 4 × 100 metres relay at the 2019 IAAF World Relays. In addition, he has won several medals at continental level.

He competed at the 2020 Summer Olympics.

== Personal bests ==
- 100 m: 10.04 (wind: +0.4 m/s) – (Brazil) Rio de Janeiro, 22 Jun 2022
- 200 m: 20.47 (wind: -0.3 m/s) – (Switzerland) Bern, 16 Jun 2018
- 4 × 100 m relay: 37.72 – (Qatar) Doha, 5 Oct 2019

== International competitions ==
Year	Competition	Venue	Position	Event	Notes
Representing Brazil
2016	South American U23 Championships	Lima, Peru	1st	100 m	10.21
2016	South American U23 Championships	Lima, Peru	1st	200 m	21.20
2016	South American U23 Championships	Lima, Peru	1st	4 × 100 m relay	39.86
2016	South American U23 Championships	Lima, Peru	1st	4 × 400 m relay	3:13.73
2019	World Relays	Yokohama, Japan	1st	4 × 100 m relay	38.05
2019	South American Championships	Lima, Peru	1st	100 m	10.28
2019	South American Championships	Lima, Peru	2nd	200 m	20.63
2019	South American Championships	Lima, Peru	2nd	4 × 100 m relay	39.91
2019	Universiade	Naples, Italy	3rd	100 m	10.32
2019	Universiade	Naples, Italy	12th (h)	200 m	21.21^{1}
2019	Universiade	Naples, Italy	7th	4 × 100 m relay	1:23.05
2019	Pan American Games	Lima, Peru	4th	100 m	10.27
2019	Pan American Games	Lima, Peru	1st	4 × 100 m relay	38.27
2019	World Championships	Doha, Qatar	30th (h)	100 m	10.25
2019	World Championships	Doha, Qatar	4th	4 × 100 m relay	37.72
2021	World Relays	Chorzów, Poland	2nd (h)	4 × 100 m relay	38.45^{2}
2021	Olympic Games	Tokyo, Japan	34th (h)	100 m	10.24
2021	Olympic Games	Tokyo, Japan	12th (h)	4 × 100 m electrical relay	38.34
2022	World Championships	Eugene, United States	17th (sf)	100 m	10.19
2022	World Championships	Eugene, United States	7th	4 × 100 m relay	38.25
2022	South American Games	Asunción, Paraguay	4th	100 m	10.53
2022	South American Games	Asunción, Paraguay	–	4 × 100 m relay	DNF
2023	South American Championships	São Paulo, Brazil	1st	4 × 100 m relay	38.70
2023	World Championships	Budapest, Hungary	8th (h)	4 × 100 m relay	38.19^{2}
2023	Pan American Games	Santiago, Chile	1st	4 × 100 m relay	38.68
2024	Ibero-American Championships	Cuiabá, Brazil	1st	4 × 100 m relay	39.19
2025	South American Championships	Mar del Plata, Argentina	4th (h)	4 × 100 m relay	40.00

^{1}Disqualified in the semifinals
^{2}Disqualified in the final
