= Eliana Chávez =

Colombian sprinter (born 1997)

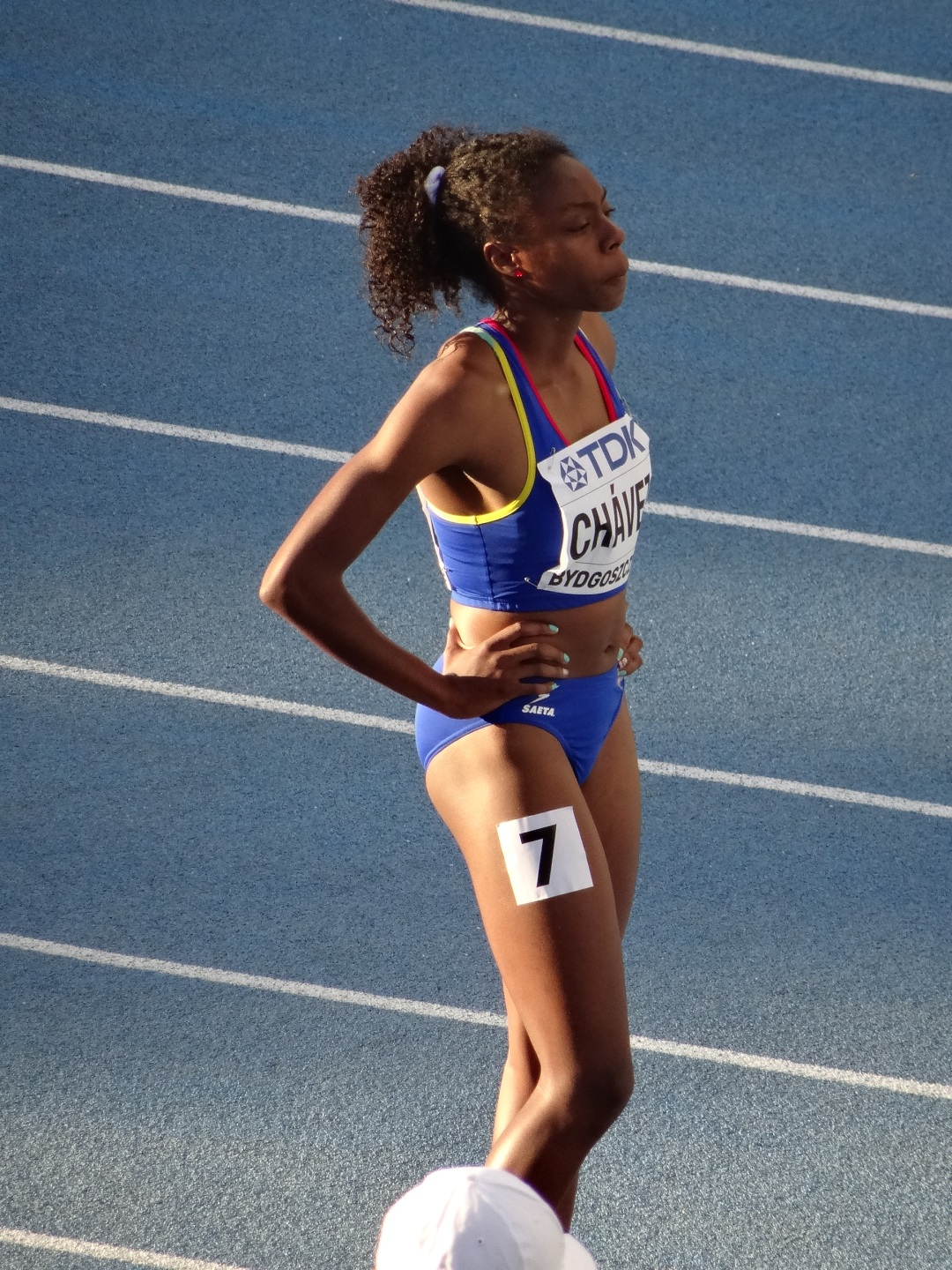
- Eliana Chávez in 2016

Personal information
- Full name: Eliana Chávez Valencia
- Born: December 28, 1997 (age 28)
- Education: Santo Tomás University
- Height: 1.65 m (5 ft 5 in)
- Weight: 58 kg (128 lb)

Sport
- Sport: Athletics
- Event: 400 metres

Eliana Chávez Valencia (born 28 December 1997) is a Colombian sprinter specialising in the 400 metres. She won a gold medal in the 4 × 400 metres relay at the 2018 South American Games.

Her personal best in the event is 53.74 seconds set in Cochabamba in 2018.

== International competitions ==
Year	Competition	Venue	Position	Event	Notes
Representing Colombia
2013	Pan American Junior Championships	Medellín, Colombia	8th	800 m	2:17.57
2014	South American Youth Championships	Cali, Colombia	3rd	400 m	55.30
2015	Pan American Junior Championships	Edmonton, Canada	14th (h)	400 m	57.82
2015	Pan American Junior Championships	Edmonton, Canada	7th	800 m	2:20.99
2015	Pan American Junior Championships	Edmonton, Canada	–	4 × 400 m relay	DQ
2016	World U20 Championships	Bydgoszcz, Poland	37th (h)	400 m	56.96
2016	South American U23 Championships	Lima, Peru	2nd	400 m	54.48
2017	World Relays	Nassau, Bahamas	12th (h)	4 × 400 m relay	3:40.19
2017	South American Championships	Asunción, Paraguay	2nd	4 × 400 m relay	3:33.92
2017	Universiade	Taipei, Taiwan	20th (sf)	400 m	57.05
2017	Bolivarian Games	Santa Marta, Colombia	6th	400 m	54.49
2017	Bolivarian Games	Santa Marta, Colombia	3rd	4 × 100 m relay	45.96
2017	Bolivarian Games	Santa Marta, Colombia	–	4 × 400 m relay	DQ
2018	South American Games	Cochabamba, Bolivia	4th	400 m	53.74
2018	South American Games	Cochabamba, Bolivia	1st	4 × 400 m relay	3:31.87
2018	Central American and Caribbean Games	Barranquilla, Colombia	3rd	4 × 400 m relay	3:32.61
2018	South American U23 Championships	Cuenca, Ecuador	3rd	400 m	53.11
2018	South American U23 Championships	Cuenca, Ecuador	2nd	4 × 100 m relay	45.57
2018	South American U23 Championships	Cuenca, Ecuador	1st	4 × 400 m relay	3:35.50
2019	South American Championships	Lima, Peru	5th	400 m	53.66
2019	South American Championships	Lima, Peru	2nd	4 × 100 m relay	44.97
2019	South American Championships	Lima, Peru	1st	4 × 400 m relay	3:32.81
