= Christian Gonzalez =

American football player (born 2002)

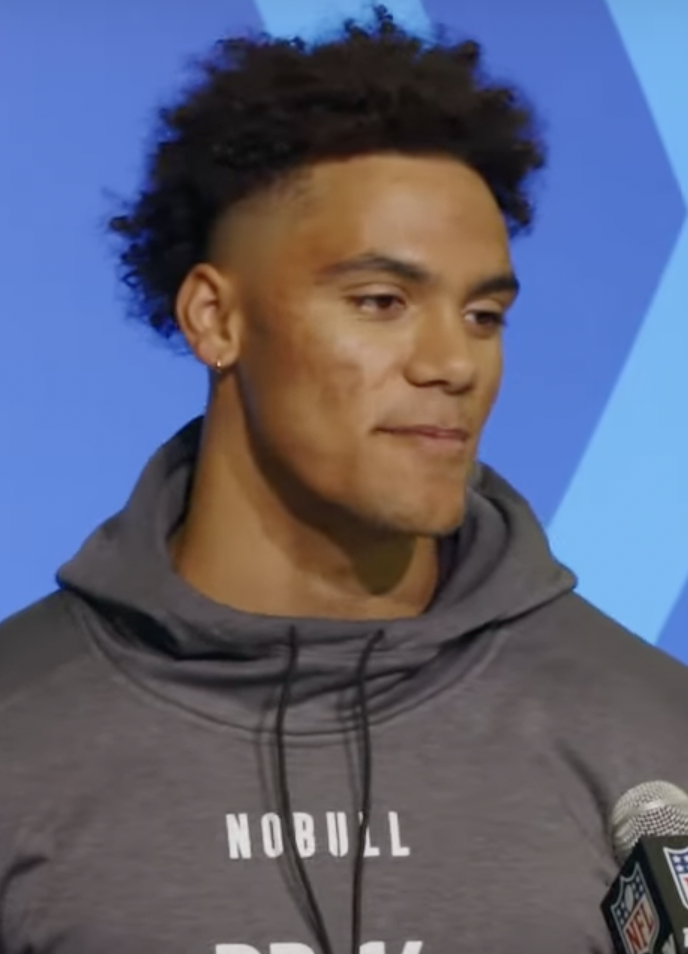
- Gonzalez at the 2023 NFL Combine

No. 0 – New England Patriots
- Position: Cornerback
- Roster status: Active

Personal information
- Born: June 28, 2002 (age 24); Carrollton, Texas, U.S.
- Listed height: 6 ft 1 in (1.85 m)
- Listed weight: 205 lb (93 kg)

Career information
- High school: The Colony (The Colony, Texas)
- College: Colorado (2020–2021); Oregon (2022)
- NFL draft: 2023: 1st round, 17th overall pick

Career history
- New England Patriots (2023–present)

Awards and highlights
- Second-team All-Pro (2024); Pro Bowl (2025); First-team All-Pac-12 (2022)

Career NFL statistics as of 2025
- Tackles: 147
- Sacks: 1.0
- Fumble recoveries: 1
- Pass deflections: 26
- Interceptions: 5
- Defensive touchdowns: 1
- Stats at Pro Football Reference

Christian Emilio Gonzalez (born June 28, 2002) is an American professional football cornerback for the New England Patriots of the National Football League (NFL). Gonzalez played two seasons of college football for the Colorado Buffaloes and one with the Oregon Ducks prior to being selected by the Patriots in the first round of the 2023 NFL draft. He is the younger brother of Colombian American hurdler Melissa Gonzalez and is the brother-in-law of NFL coach David Blough.

== Early life ==
Gonzalez was born on June 28, 2002, in Carrollton, Texas, the son of Temple Gonzalez and Hector Gonzalez. He was raised in The Colony, Texas with his three sisters. Christian attended The Colony High School, where he was rated a four-star prospect as a cornerback and wide receiver. Gonzalez initially committed to play college football at Purdue University before enrolling at the University of Colorado.

== College career ==
Gonzalez would become a full-time cornerback upon joining the Colorado Buffaloes football team in 2021. He started every game as a freshman, making 5 tackles with five pass deflections. As a sophomore, he had 53 tackles, 5.5 tackles for loss, and five passes broken up.

Gonzalez transferred to the University of Oregon in 2022 to play for the Oregon Ducks. He was named first-team All-Pac-12 after recording 45 tackles, 7 pass breakups, and 3 interceptions. After the season, Gonzalez decided to forgo his remaining two years of eligibility and enter the 2023 NFL draft.

== Professional career ==
=== Pre-draft ===
Dane Brugler of the Athletic had Gonzalez ranked as the top cornerback available in the draft. He was listed as the second best by Pro Football Focus (12th overall), ESPN, NFL analyst Bucky Brooks, NFL.com media analyst Daniel Jeremiah, ESPN analyst Mel Kiper Jr., Michael Renner of Pro Football Focus, and Scouts Inc. (8th overall). NFL draft analyst Lance Zierlein projected Gonzalez to be selected in the first round of the 2023 NFL Draft.

External videos
- NFL Combine: Christian Gonzalez
- Gonzalez runs 4.38s 40-yard dash

Pre-draft measurables
Height	Weight	Arm length	Hand span	Wingspan	40-yard dash	10-yard split	20-yard split	Vertical jump	Broad jump	Bench press
6 ft 1 3/8 in (1.86 m)	197 lb (89 kg)	32 in (0.81 m)	9 1/2 in (0.24 m)	6 ft 4 7/8 in (1.95 m)	4.38 s	1.54 s	2.57 s	41.5 in (1.05 m)	11 ft 1 in (3.38 m)	14 reps
All values from NFL Combine

=== 2023 ===
The New England Patriots selected Gonzalez in the first round (17th overall, and 3rd cornerback) of the 2023 NFL draft.

External videos
- Patriots select Christian Gonzalez No. 17
- First Draft: Christian Gonzalez

On July 21, 2023, the New England Patriots signed Gonzalez to a fully-guaranteed 4–year, $15.10 million rookie contract which included an initial signing bonus of $7.98 million.

Throughout training camp he competed against Marcus Jones, Myles Bryant, and Shaun Wade for the No. 2 starting cornerback slot, which he earned and joined No. 1 starting cornerback Jonathan Jones.

On September 10, 2023, Gonzalez made his professional regular season debut and earned his first career start in the New England Patriots' home-opener against the Philadelphia Eagles. He set a season-high with seven combined tackles (five solo), broke up a pass, and had his first career sack on Jalen Hurts for an eight–yard loss during a 20–25 loss. In week 2, he set a season-high with six solo tackles, made one pass deflection, and made his first career interception on a pass attempt thrown by Tua Tagovailoa to wide receiver Tyreek Hill during a 17–24 loss against the Miami Dolphins. He was awarded with his first NFL award, receiving Defensive Rookie of the Month for September. In week 4, Gonzalez recorded one solo tackle before exiting during the second quarter of a 3–38 loss at the Dallas Cowboys after suffering a torn labrum. On October 7, 2023, the Patriots officially placed Gonzalez was on injured reserve for the remainder of the season after it was confirmed that he had suffered a dislocated shoulder and torn labrum, with both requiring surgery. He finished his rookie season with a total of 17 combined tackles (14 solo), three pass deflections, one sack, and an interception in four games and four starts. He received an overall grade of 80.8 from Pro Football Focus in 2023.

=== 2024 ===
On January 12, 2024, the New England Patriots promoted inside linebackers coach Jerod Mayo to head coach following the departure of Bill Belichick. Defensive coordinator DeMarcus Covington chose to retain Gonzalez and Jonathan Jones as the starting cornerbacks to begin the season.

On October 6, 2024, Gonzalez tied his season-high of six solo tackles, made two pass deflections, and intercepted a pass by Tyler Huntley to wide receiver Odell Beckham during a 10–15 loss to the Miami Dolphins. On November 24, 2024, Gonzalez made three combined tackles (two solo), one pass deflection, and returned a fumble recovery 63–yards to score his first career touchdown during a 15–34 loss at the Miami Dolphins. He scored his touchdown after recovering a fumble by running back Jaylen Wright that was caused by linebacker Marte Mapu in the fourth quarter. In week 13, he tied his season-high of six combined tackles (five solo), made two pass deflections, and set a career-high with his second interception of the season on a pass by Anthony Richardson to wide receiver Alec Pierce during a 24–25 loss to the Indianapolis Colts. On December 28, 2024, Gonzalez recorded one solo tackle before exiting early in the second quarter of a 7–40 loss against the Los Angeles Chargers after sustaining a concussion. He was subsequently inactive for the Patriots' 23–16 victory against the Buffalo Bills in week 18. He finished the season with 59 combined tackles (50 solo), 11 pass deflections, two interceptions, one fumble recovery, and a touchdown in 16 games and 16 starts. He received an overall grade of 76.0 from Pro Football Focus, which ranked 21st amongst 222 qualifying cornerbacks in 2024. He was ranked 84th by his fellow players on the NFL Top 100 Players of 2025.

=== 2025 ===
On July 28, 2025, Gonzalez suffered a hamstring injury during the second week of training camp, missing the first three games of the regular season.

He returned on September 28, 2025 in a 42–13 win over the Carolina Panthers, recording three tackles and holding Tet McMillan to only two catches for 31 yards when defending him. He finished the season with 69 tackles (54 solo) with 10 pass deflections and only allowing two touchdowns in 14 games. He received an overall grade of 65.8 from Pro Football Focus, which ranked 43rd amongst 217 qualifying cornerbacks in 2025, and was named to the 2026 Pro Bowl Games, his first ever Pro Bowl in his career. He was ranked 28th by his fellow players on the NFL Top 100 Players of 2026, up 56 spots from the previous season.

In the AFC Championship against the Denver Broncos, Gonzalez recorded six tackles, one pass deflection, and a crucial interception late in the fourth quarter in the 10–7 win, advancing to Super Bowl LX. Despite the Patriots' loss in Super Bowl LX, Gonzalez allowed only 3 receptions for 36 yards, breaking up 3 passes, garnering acclaim from fans and sports media.

=== 2026 ===
On April 28, 2026, the Patriots picked up the fifth-year option on Gonzalez's contract. On September 8, it was announced that the Patriots had signed Gonzalez to a four-year, $135 million contract extension with $102 million guaranteed, making him the NFL's highest paid cornerback at that time. He has recreated association footballer Michael Olise's goal celebration after a touchdown at Allianz Arena in Germany.

== Career statistics ==
Legend
	Led the league
**Bold**	Career high

=== NFL ===
==== Regular season ====
Year	Team	Games		Tackles					Interceptions						Fumbles			
Year	Team	GP	GS	Cmb	Solo	Ast	Sck	TFL	PD	Int	Yds	Avg	Lng	TD	FF	FR	Yds	TD
2023	NE	4	4	17	14	3	**1.0**	**1**	3	1	0	0.0	0	0	0	0	0	0
2024	NE	16	16	59	50	9	0.0	**1**	**11**	**2**	**2**	**1.0**	**2**	0	0	**1**	**63**	**1**
2025	NE	14	14	**69**	**54**	**15**	0.0	**1**	10	0	0	—	0	0	0	0	0	0
2026	NE	3	3	8	7	1	0.0	0	5	0	0	—	0	0	0	0	0	0
Career		37	37	153	125	28	1.0	3	26	3	2	0.7	2	0	0	1	63	1

==== Postseason ====
Year	Team	Games		Tackles					Interceptions						Fumbles			
Year	Team	GP	GS	Cmb	Solo	Ast	Sck	TFL	PD	Int	Yds	Avg	Lng	TD	FF	FR	Yds	TD
2025	NE	4	4	19	15	4	1.0	1	7	1	0	0.0	0	0	1	0	0	0
Career		4	4	19	15	4	1.0	1	7	1	0	0.0	0	0	1	0	0	0

=== College ===
Year	Team	GP	Tackles					Interceptions					Fumbles			
Year	Team	GP	Cmb	Solo	Ast	Sck	TFL	PD	Int	Yds	Avg	TD	FF	FR	Yds	TD
2020	Colorado	6	25	23	2	0.0	0.0	5	0	0	—	0	0	0	0	0
2021	Colorado	12	**53**	**42**	11	0.0	**5.5**	5	0	0	—	0	0	0	0	0
2022	Oregon	12	50	35	**15**	0.0	1.0	**7**	**4**	**118**	**29.5**	0	0	0	0	0
Career		30	128	100	28	0.0	6.5	17	4	118	29.5	0	0	0	0	0

== Personal life ==
Gonzalez was born to a Colombian family. His father, Hector, is 6-foot-9 and played college basketball at the University of Texas at El Paso before playing semiprofessionally in Colombia. He has three sisters, Melissa, Samantha, and Lily. Melissa (University of Texas) and Samantha (University of Miami) were two-time All-Americans in track and field, with Melissa representing Colombia in international events. Melissa is married to NFL coach and former quarterback David Blough. Gonzalez is a Christian.
