= Ricardo de Souza =

Brazilian track and field sprinter (born 1994)

Personal information
- Nationality: Brazilian
- Born: 21 September 1994 (age 31)
- Height: 1.75 m (5 ft 9 in)
- Weight: 70 kg (154 lb)

Sport
- Sport: Track and field
- Event: 100 metres
- Club: Benfica

Achievements and titles
- Personal best: 100 m: 10.21 (2016)

Ricardo Mário de Souza (born 21 September 1994) is a Brazilian track and field sprinter who competes in the 100 metres. He represented the host nation at the 2016 Rio Olympics. He holds a personal best of 10.21 seconds for the 100 m.

He emerged in 2013 with three medals at the 2013 South American Junior Championships in Athletics. He enjoyed success with the Brazilian 4 × 100 metres relay team, taking bronze at the 2013 Pan American Junior Athletics Championships, a gold at the 2014 South American Under-23 Championships in Athletics, and a silver at the 2016 Ibero-American Championships in Athletics held in Rio de Janeiro.

At the 2016 Summer Olympics he led off a team including Vitor Hugo dos Santos, Bruno de Barros, and Jorge Vides that placed sixth in the final.

== Personal bests ==
- 100 metres – 10.21 (2016)
- 200 metres – 20.78 (2014)
- 400 metres – 49.41 (2015)
- 4 × 100 metres relay – 38.19 (2016)

All information from All-Athletics profile.

== International competitions ==
Year	Competition	Venue	Position	Event	Notes
2013	South American Junior Championships	Resistencia, Argentina	2nd	100 m	10.42w
2013	South American Junior Championships	Resistencia, Argentina	3rd	200 m	21.55
2013	South American Junior Championships	Resistencia, Argentina	1st	4 × 100 m relay	40.32
2013	Pan American Junior Championships	Medellín, Colombia	3rd	4 × 100 m relay	39.96
2014	South American U23 Championships	Montevideo, Uruguay	4th	100 m	10.64
2014	South American U23 Championships	Montevideo, Uruguay	1st	4 × 100 m relay	39.74
2016	Ibero-American Championships	Rio de Janeiro, Brazil	2nd	4 × 100 m relay	38.65
2016	Olympic Games	Rio de Janeiro, Brazil	6th	4 × 100 m relay	38.41
2016	South American U23 Championships	Lima, Peru	3rd	100 m	10.47
2016	South American U23 Championships	Lima, Peru	1st	4 × 100 m relay	39.86
