= Jhonny Rentería =

Colombian sprinter (born 1997)

Personal information
- Full name: Jhonny Alexander Rentería Jiménez
- Born: March 26, 1997 (age 29)
- Height: 1.70 m (5 ft 7 in) m
- Weight: 62 kg (137 lb)

Sport
- Country: Colombia
- Sport: Athletics
- Events: 60 metres; 100 metres; 200 metres; 4×100 metres; 4×400 metres

Achievements and titles
- Personal bests: 60 metres: 6.65 (2019); 100 metres: 9.97 (2024); 200 metres: 20.73 (2025); 4×100 metres: 38.66 (2024); 4×400 metres: 3:13.70 (2021)
Medal record
Representing Colombia
Men's athletics
Event	1st	2nd	3rd
Ibero-American Championships	0	1	0
South American Games	1	0	1
South American Championships	1	2	1
Bolivarian Games	0	1	1
South American U23 Championships	1	2	0
South American U18 Championships	1	0	0
Total	4	6	3
Ibero-American Championships
Silver medal – second place	2024 Cuiabá	4×100 m relay
South American Games
Gold medal – first place	2018 Cochabamba	4×100 m relay
Bronze medal – third place	2022 Asunción	4×100 m relay
South American Championships
Gold medal – first place	2025 Mar del Plata	4×100 m relay
Silver medal – second place	2017 Asunción	4×100 m relay
Silver medal – second place	2021 Guayaquil	4×100 m relay
Bronze medal – third place	2019 Lima	4×100 m relay
Bolivarian Games
Silver medal – second place	2017 Santa Marta	4×100 m relay
Bronze medal – third place	2017 Santa Marta	100 m
South American U23 Championships
Gold medal – first place	2018 Cuenca	4×100 m relay
Silver medal – second place	2016 Lima	100 m
Silver medal – second place	2016 Lima	4×100 m relay
South American U18 Championships
Gold medal – first place	2014 Cali	100 m

Jhonny Alexander Rentería Jiménez (born 26 March 1997) is a Colombian sprinter. He has won several medals at regional level.

His personal bests are 9.97 seconds in the 100 metres (+1.5 m/s, Bilbao 2024) and 20.73 seconds in the 200 metres (+1.9 m/s, Quito 2025).

== International competitions ==
Year	Competition	Venue	Position	Event	Notes
Representing Colombia
2014	South American U18 Championships	Cali, Colombia	1st	100 m	10.61 s
2015	Pan American U20 Championships	Edmonton, Canada	5th	100 m	10.60 s
2016	World U20 Championships	Bydgoszcz, Poland	16th (sf)	100 m	10.53 s
2016	South American U23 Championships	Lima, Peru	2nd	100 m	10.41 s
2016	South American U23 Championships	Lima, Peru	2nd	4 × 100 m relay	40.70 s
2017	South American Championships	Asunción, Paraguay	5th	100 m	10.31 s
2017	South American Championships	Asunción, Paraguay	2nd	4 × 100 m relay	39.67 s
2017	Bolivarian Games	Santa Marta, Colombia	3rd	100 m	10.44 s
2017	Bolivarian Games	Santa Marta, Colombia	2nd	4 × 100 m relay	39.58 s
2018	South American Games	Cochabamba, Bolivia	4th	100 m	10.25 s
2018	South American Games	Cochabamba, Bolivia	1st	4 × 100 m relay	38.97 s NR
2018	Central American and Caribbean Games	Barranquilla, Colombia	10th (sf)	100 m	10.25 s
2018	Central American and Caribbean Games	Barranquilla, Colombia	6th	4 × 100 m relay	39.17 s
2018	South American U23 Championships	Cuenca, Ecuador	—N/a	100 m	DQ
2018	South American U23 Championships	Cuenca, Ecuador	1st	4 × 100 m relay	40.08 s
2019	South American Championships	Lima, Peru	4th	100 m	10.56 s
2019	South American Championships	Lima, Peru	3rd	4 × 100 m relay	39.94 s
2019	Pan American Games	Lima, Peru	11th (h)	100 m	10.43 s
2021	South American Championships	Guayaquil, Ecuador	7th	100 m	10.50 s
2021	South American Championships	Guayaquil, Ecuador	2nd	4 × 100 m relay	39.65 s
2022	Bolivarian Games	Valledupar, Colombia	9th (h)	100 m	10.87 s
2022	Bolivarian Games	Valledupar, Colombia	4th	4 × 100 m relay	40.19 s
2022	South American Games	Asunción, Paraguay	3rd	4 × 100 m relay	39.74 s
2023	Central American and Caribbean Games	San Salvador, El Salvador	4th	4 × 100 m relay	39.45 s
2023	South American Championships	São Paulo, Brazil	—N/a	4 × 100 m relay	DNF
2024	World Relays	Nassau, Bahamas	22nd (h)	4 × 100 m relay	39.20 s
2024	Ibero-American Championships	Cuiabá, Brazil	10th (h)	100 m	10.38 s
2024	Ibero-American Championships	Cuiabá, Brazil	2nd	4 × 100 m relay	39.23 s
2024	Olympic Games	Paris, France	53rd (h)	100 m	10.38 s
2025	South American Championships	Mar del Plata, Argentina	1st	4 × 100 m relay	39.58 s
2025	World Relays	Guangzhou, China	18th (h)	4 × 100 m relay	38.75 s
