= José Miguel Ballivian =

Chilean discus thrower

José Miguel Ballivian, born 17 December 1997, is a discus thrower from Chile.

Ballivian competed in the 2014 Summer Youth Olympics in Nanjing, China. He is the South American Junior Champion 2014.

== International competitions ==
Year	Competition	Venue	Position	Event	Notes
Representing Chile
2014	Youth Olympic Games	Nanjing, China	14th	Discus throw (1.5 kg)	50.88 m
2014	South American Youth Championships	Cali, Colombia	5th	Shot put (5 kg)	16.56 m
2014	South American Youth Championships	Cali, Colombia	1st	Discus throw (1.5 kg)	53.94 m
2015	South American Junior Championships	Cuenca, Ecuador	4th	Shot put (6 kg)	17.53 m
2015	South American Junior Championships	Cuenca, Ecuador	4th	Discus throw (1.75 kg)	52.04 m
2015	Pan American Junior Championships	Edmonton, Canada	3rd	Discus throw (1.75 kg)	54.43 m
2016	World U20 Championships	Bydgoszcz, Poland	18th (q)	Shot put (6 kg)	17.60 m
2016	World U20 Championships	Bydgoszcz, Poland	13th (q)	Discus throw (1.75 kg)	57.15 m
2016	South American U23 Championships	Lima, Peru	3rd	Discus throw	51.83 m
2017	South American Championships	Asunción, Paraguay	7th	Shot put	16.10 m
2017	South American Championships	Asunción, Paraguay	5th	Discus throw	54.51 m
2017	Bolivarian Games	Santa Marta, Colombia	2nd	Discus throw	55.53 m
2018	South American Games	Cochabamba, Bolivia	4th	Shot put	17.28 m
2018	South American Games	Cochabamba, Bolivia	3rd	Discus throw	52.91 m
2018	South American U23 Championships	Cuenca, Ecuador	2nd	Shot put	17.46 m
2018	South American U23 Championships	Cuenca, Ecuador	3rd	Discus throw	52.11 m
2019	Universiade	Naples, Italy	18th (q)	Shot put	17.26 m
2021	South American Championships	Guayaquil, Ecuador	5th	Shot put	18.10 m

== Personal bests ==
- Discus Throw 1,750 kg 57.15
- Discus Throw 1,500 kg 53.94
- Shot Put 6 kg 18.41
- Shot Put 5 kg 17.14
