= Mauricio Ortega (discus thrower) =

Colombian discus thrower (born 1994)

Personal information
- Full name: Mauricio Alexander Ortega Girón
- Born: August 4, 1994 (age 32) Apartadó, Antioquia, Colombia
- Height: 1.80 m (5 ft 11 in)
- Weight: 90 kg (198 lb)

Sport
- Country: Colombia
- Sport: Athletics
- Event: Discus throw

Achievements and titles
- Personal best: Discus throw: 70.29 m AR (2020)
Medal record
Representing Colombia
Men's athletics
Event	1st	2nd	3rd
Pan American Games	0	1	0
Ibero-American Championships	1	0	0
CAC Games	1	2	0
South American Games	2	1	0
South American Championships	3	0	3
Bolivarian Games	1	0	0
Pan American U20 Championships	0	1	0
South American U23 Championships	3	0	0
South American U20 Championships	2	0	0
Total	13	5	3
Pan American Games
Silver medal – second place	2023 Santiago	Discus throw
Ibero-American Championships
Gold medal – first place	2018 Trujillo	Discus throw
Central American and Caribbean Games
Gold medal – first place	2018 Barranquilla	Discus throw
Silver medal – second place	2014 Veracruz	Discus throw
Silver medal – second place	2023 San Salvador	Discus throw
South American Games
Gold medal – first place	2014 Santiago	Discus throw
Gold medal – first place	2018 Cochabamba	Discus throw
Silver medal – second place	2022 Asunción	Discus throw
South American Championships
Gold medal – first place	2015 Lima	Discus throw
Gold medal – first place	2017 Asunción	Discus throw
Gold medal – first place	2019 Lima	Discus throw
Bronze medal – third place	2013 Cartagena	Discus throw
Bronze medal – third place	2023 São Paulo	Discus throw
Bronze medal – third place	2025 Mar del Plata	Discus throw
Bolivarian Games
Gold medal – first place	2013 Trujillo	Discus throw
Pan American U20 Championships
Silver medal – second place	2013 Medellín	Discus throw
South American U23 Championships
Gold medal – first place	2012 São Paulo	Discus throw
Gold medal – first place	2014 Montevideo	Discus throw
Gold medal – first place	2016 Lima	Discus throw
South American U20 Championships
Gold medal – first place	2011 Medellín	Discus throw
Gold medal – first place	2013 Resistencia	Discus throw
- Updated on 8 September 2025

Mauricio Alexander Ortega Girón (born 4 August 1994 in Apartadó, Antioquia) is a Colombian discus thrower. His personal best of 70.29 m for the event is the National record. He also holds the South American record.

He was the gold medallist at the 2014 South American Games and a bronze medallist at the 2013 South American Championships in Athletics. He was a two-time champion at the South American U20 Championships.

== Career ==
He competed at the 2011 World Youth Championships in Athletics and placed fourth. He topped the podium at the 2011 South American Junior Championships in Athletics with a national junior record mark of 58.48 m (191 ft 10 1/4 in) – he was the youngest entrant at the event. At the 2012 World Junior Championships in Athletics he improved his record to 59.84 m (196 ft 3 3/4 in) in qualifying, but performed less well in the final and finished ninth. He began to throw with the senior-weight discus that year and was the winner of the 2012 South American Under-23 Championships in Athletics. He won at the National Games of Colombia with a personal best of 55.00 m (180 ft 5 1/4 in).

Ortega established himself at the senior level in 2013. He won his first Colombian senior title in June and took the bronze medal at the 2013 South American Championships in Athletics with a personal best of 57.76 m (189 ft 6 in). The 2013 Pan American Junior Athletics Championships was hosted in Medellín and he came second to Hayden Reed with a junior personal best of 61.77 m (202 ft 7 3/4 in). He improved further to a South American U20 record and championship record of 62.78 m (205 ft 11 1/2 in) to win gold at the 2013 South American Junior Championships in Athletics, which was also in Colombia. A Colombian senior record came at the 2013 Bolivarian Games, where his throw of 59.67 m (195 ft 9 in) brought him the gold medal in a games record.

He improved the national record to 59.95 m (196 ft 8 in) at the 2014 South American Games, breaking the games record to take the gold medal.

== Personal bests ==
Event	Result	Venue	Date
Discus throw	70.29 m AR A	(Portugal) Lovelhe	22 July 2020

== International competitions ==
Year	Competition	Venue	Position	Event	Notes
Representing Colombia
2011	World U18 Championships	Villeneuve-d'Ascq, France	4th	Discus throw (1.5 kg)	60.28 m
2011	South American U20 Championships	Medellín, Colombia	1st	Discus throw (1.75 kg)	58.48 m A
2012	World U20 Championships	Barcelona, Spain	9th	Discus throw (1.75 kg)	57.50 m
2012	South American U23 Championships	São Paulo, Brazil	1st	Discus throw	53.94 m
2013	South American Championships	Cartagena, Colombia	3rd	Discus throw	57.76 m NU20R
2013	Pan American U20 Championships	Medellín, Colombia	2nd	Discus throw (1.75 kg)	61.77 m A
2013	South American U20 Championships	Resistencia, Argentina	1st	Discus throw (1.75 kg)	62.78 m CR
2013	Bolivarian Games	Trujillo, Peru	1st	Discus throw	59.67 m GR, AU20R, NR
2014	South American Games	Santiago, Chile	1st	Discus throw	59.95 m GR, NR
2014	Ibero-American Championships	São Paulo, Brazil	4th	Discus throw	59.10 m
2014	South American U23 Championships	Montevideo, Uruguay	1st	Discus throw	60.46 m CR
2014	Central American and Caribbean Games	Xalapa, Mexico	2nd	Discus throw	60.69 m A
2015	South American Championships	Lima, Peru	1st	Discus throw	61.36 m
2015	Pan American Games	Toronto, Canada	7th	Discus throw	61.33 m
2015	World Championships	Beijing, China	11th	Discus throw	62.01 m
2016	Olympic Games	Rio de Janeiro, Brazil	18th (q)	Discus throw	61.62 m
2016	South American U23 Championships	Lima, Peru	1st	Discus throw	57.60 m
2017	South American Championships	Asunción, Paraguay	1st	Discus throw	63.82 m CR
2017	World Championships	London, United Kingdom	16th (q)	Discus throw	62.97 m
2018	South American Games	Cochabamba, Bolivia	1st	Discus throw	62.10 m A GR
2018	Central American and Caribbean Games	Barranquilla, Colombia	1st	Discus throw	66.30 m NR
2018	Ibero-American Championships	Trujillo, Peru	1st	Discus throw	60.49 m
2019	South American Championships	Lima, Peru	1st	Discus throw	58.89 m
2019	Pan American Games	Lima, Peru	5th	Discus throw	61.15 m
2019	World Championships	Doha, Qatar	20th (q)	Discus throw	61.92 m
2021	Olympic Games	Tokyo, Japan	7th	Discus throw	64.08 m
2021	Memorial Van Damme	Brussels, Belgium	8th	Discus throw	62.76 m
2022	World Championships	Eugene, Oregon, United States	26th (q)	Discus throw	59.91 m
2022	South American Games	Asunción, Paraguay	2nd	Discus throw	63.59 m
2023	Central American and Caribbean Games	San Salvador, El Salvador	2nd	Discus throw	61.67 m
2023	South American Championships	São Paulo, Brazil	3rd	Discus throw	60.15 m
2023	Pan American Games	Santiago, Chile	2nd	Discus throw	61.86 m
2024	Ibero-American Championships	Cuiabá, Brazil	4th	Discus throw	61.34 m
2024	Olympic Games	Paris, France	18th (q)	Discus throw	61.97 m
2025	South American Championships	Mar del Plata, Argentina	3rd	Discus throw	61.91 m
2025	World Championships	Tokyo, Japan	27th (q)	Discus throw	60.57 m
2026	Pan American Championships	Medellín, Colombia	5th	Discus throw	60.44 m
2026	Central American and Caribbean Games	Santo Domingo, Dominican Republic	—N/a	Discus throw	DNS
