= Athletics at the 2018 South American Games =

South American Games-2018

- Venue: Complejo Aurora
- Dates: 5–8 June
- Competitors: 295 from 14 nations

There were 45 athletics events at the 2018 South American Games in Cochabamba, Bolivia. 23 for men and 22 for women. The events were held between June 5 and 8 at the Estadio de Atletismo GAMC.

The winner of each individual event qualifies for the 2019 Pan American Games, granted their NOC enters them into the competition.

== Results ==
=== Men ===
Event	Gold		Silver		Bronze	
100 metres	Alonso Edward; Panama	10.01; GR, NR	Álex Quiñónez; Ecuador	10.09 =NR	Vitor Hugo dos Santos; Brazil	10.12
200 metres	Álex Quiñónez; Ecuador	19.93; GR, NR	Vitor Hugo dos Santos; Brazil	20.21	Bernardo Baloyes; Colombia	20.28
400 metres	Lucas Carvalho; Brazil	45.61	Yilmar Herrera; Colombia	45.64	Winston George; Guyana	45.67
800 metres	Lucirio Antonio Garrido; Venezuela	1:51.15	Jelssin Robledo; Colombia	1:51.50	Leandro Paris; Argentina	1:51.94
1500 metres	Carlos Díaz; Chile	3:50.82	Willy Canchanya; Peru	3:51.23	Federico Bruno; Argentina	3:54.34
5000 metres	Bayron Piedra; Ecuador	14:32.47	Vidal Basco; Bolivia	14:32.58	Luis Ostos; Peru	14:32.79
10,000 metres	Iván Darío González; Colombia	30:25.10	Jorge Cesar Fernández; Bolivia	30:37.29	Bayron Piedra; Ecuador	30:51.74
110 metres hurdles	Eduardo de Deus; Brazil	13.44; GR	Fanor Escobar; Colombia	13.61	Juan Moreno; Colombia	13.68
400 metres hurdles	Guillermo Ruggeri; Argentina	49.28; GR, NR	Alfredo Sepúlveda; Chile	49.62; NR	Márcio Teles; Brazil	49.78
3000 metres steeplechase	Yuri Labra; Peru	9:01.95	Gerard Giraldo; Colombia	9:01.99	Yessy Apaza; Bolivia	9:21.81
4 × 100 metres relay	Colombia; Jhonny Rentería; Diego Palomeque; Jessi Chará; Bernardo Baloyes	38.97 NR	Venezuela; Alberto Aguilar; Rafael Vásquez; Alexis Nieves; Arturo Ramírez	39.03	Brazil; Lucas Carvalho; Vítor Hugo dos Santos; Aldemir da Silva Júnior; Felipe dos Santos	39.54
4 × 400 metres relay	Colombia; Bernardo Baloyes; Jelssin Robledo; Diego Palomeque; Yilmar Herrera	3:04.78	Venezuela; José Meléndez; Alberto Aguilar; Freddy Mezones; Kelvis Padrino	3:05.75	Chile; Enzo Faulbaum; Rafael Muñoz; Sergio Aldea; Alfredo Sepúlveda	3:11.58
20 kilometres walk	Brian Pintado; Ecuador	1:24:56	César Rodríguez; Peru	1:26:23	Yerko Araya; Chile	1:29:37
50 kilometres walk	Andrés Chocho; Ecuador	3:55:48; GR	Luis Henry Campos; Peru	3:59:23	Ronald Quispe; Bolivia	4:05:05
High jump	Eure Yáñez; Venezuela	2.28 m GR	Fernando Ferreira; Brazil	2.25 m	Carlos Layoy; Argentina	2.25 m
Pole vault	Augusto Dutra de Oliveira; Brazil	5.50 m	Germán Chiaraviglio; Argentina	5.40 m	Walter Viáfara; Colombia	5.00 m
Long jump	Emiliano Lasa; Uruguay	8.26 m GR, NR	Paulo Sérgio Oliveira; Brazil	8.12 m	Alexsandro de Melo; Brazil	8.09 m
Triple jump	Miguel van Assen; Suriname	16.81 m GR	Mateus de Sá; Brazil	16.76 m	Leodan Torrealba; Venezuela	16.23 m
Shot put	Darlan Romani; Brazil	21.21 m GR	Aldo Gonzáles; Bolivia	18.33 m	Levin Moreno; Colombia	17.60 m
Discus throw	Mauricio Ortega; Colombia	62.10 m GR	Juan Caicedo; Ecuador	57.37 m	José Miguel Ballivián; Chile	52.91 m
Hammer throw	Joaquín Gómez; Argentina	75.10 m GR	Humberto Mansilla; Chile	74.71 m NR	Wagner Domingos; Brazil	72.53 m
Javelin throw	Arley Ibargüen; Colombia	80.11 m GR	Leslain Baird; Guyana	78.65 m NR	Braian Toledo; Argentina	78.57 m
Decathlon	Georni Jaramillo; Venezuela	7977 pts GR, NR	José Lemos; Colombia	7757 pts	Felipe dos Santos; Brazil	7739 pts

=== Women ===
Event	Gold		Silver		Bronze	
100 metres	Narcisa Landazuri; Ecuador	11.12	Ángela Tenorio; Ecuador	11.13	Vitória Cristina Rosa; Brazil	11.23
200 metres	Vitória Cristina Rosa; Brazil	22.87	Ángela Tenorio; Ecuador	23.07	Nercely Soto; Venezuela	23.11
400 metres	Jennifer Padilla; Colombia	52.14	Geisa Coutinho; Brazil	52.93	María Fernanda Mackenna; Chile	53.60
800 metres	Déborah Rodríguez; Uruguay	2:16.21	Rosangélica Escobar; Colombia	2:16.89	María Pía Fernández; Uruguay	2:17.16
1500 metres	Muriel Coneo; Colombia	4:27.10	María Pía Fernández; Uruguay	4:30.56	Micaela Levaggi; Argentina	4:30.88
5000 metres	Saida Meneses; Peru	16:47.37	Luz Mery Rojas; Peru	17:09.59	Carmen Toaquiza; Ecuador	17:16.40
10,000 metres	Inés Melchor; Peru	35:57.86	Gladys Tejeda; Peru	35:59.45	Irma Vila Sonco; Bolivia	36:12.74
100 metres hurdles	Génesis Romero; Venezuela	13.08; GR, NR	Diana Bazalar; Peru	13.36; NR	Jenea McCammon; Guyana	13.39; NR
400 metres hurdles	Fiorella Chiappe; Argentina	56.39	Melissa Gonzalez; Colombia	56.86	Gianna Woodruff; Panama	57.68
3000 metres steeplechase	Rina Cjuro; Peru	10:53.83	Edith Mamani; Bolivia	10:59.06	Jhoselyn Camargo; Bolivia	11:18.63
4 × 100 metres relay	Venezuela; Luisarys Toledo; Andrea Purica; Génesis Romero; Nercely Soto	44.71	Bolivia; Danitza Avila; Alinny Delgadillo; Guadalupe Torrez; Carolina Ocampo	46.17; NR	Peru; Paola Mautino; Maitte Torres; Diana Bazalar; Kimberly Cardoza	46.43
4 × 400 metres relay	Colombia; Eliana Chávez; Rosangélica Escobar; Melissa Gonzalez; Jennifer Padilla	3:31.87; GR	Chile; Martina Weil; Isidora Jiménez; María Echeverría; María Fernanda Mackenna	3:33.42; NR	Argentina; María Ayelén Diogo; Valeria Baron; Noelia Martínez; Fiorella Chiappe	3:35.96; NR
20 kilometres walk	Kimberly García; Peru	1:33:11; GR	Ángela Castro; Bolivia	1:34:25	Maritza Guamán; Ecuador	1:36:23
High jump	María Fernanda Murillo; Colombia	1.90 m GR	Valdileia Martins; Brazil	1.83 m	Amanda Vergara; Venezuela	1.80 m
Pole vault	Robeilys Peinado; Venezuela	4.70 m GR, NR	Juliana Campos; Brazil	4.20 m	Carmen Villanueva; Venezuela	3.90 m
Long jump	Paola Mautino; Peru	6.66 m NR	Eliane Martins; Brazil	6.66 m GR	Nathalee Aranda; Panama	6.60 m NR
Triple jump	Núbia Soares; Brazil	14.59 m GR, NR	Silvana Segura; Peru	13.56 m	Giselly Landázury; Colombia	13.46 m
Shot put	Natalia Duco; Chile	18.15 m GR	Ahimara Espinoza; Venezuela	18.09 m	Geisa Arcanjo; Brazil	17.30 m
Discus throw	Andressa de Morais; Brazil	58.86 m	Fernanda Martins; Brazil	57.29 m	Ailén Armada; Argentina	48.77 m
Hammer throw	Jennifer Dahlgren; Argentina	70.98 m GR	Rosa Rodríguez; Venezuela	70.93 m	Valeria Chiliquinga; Ecuador	66.77 m
Javelin throw	Laila Domingos; Brazil	60.25 m	María Lucelly Murillo; Colombia	58.81 m	Eloah Scramin; Brazil	57.42 m
Heptathlon	Giovana Cavaleti; Brazil	6081 pts GR	Martha Araújo; Colombia	5719 pts	Ana Camila Pirelli; Paraguay	5503 pts

== Medal table ==
* Host nation (Bolivia)

Rank	Nation	Gold	Silver	Bronze	Total
1	Brazil (BRA)	9	9	9	27
2	Colombia (COL)	9	9	5	23
3	Peru (PER)	6	7	2	15
4	Venezuela (VEN)	6	4	4	14
5	Ecuador (ECU)	5	4	4	13
6	Argentina (ARG)	4	1	7	12
7	Chile (CHI)	2	3	4	9
8	Uruguay (URU)	2	1	1	4
9	Panama (PAN)	1	0	2	3
10	Suriname (SUR)	1	0	0	1
11	Bolivia (BOL)*	0	6	4	10
12	Guyana (GUY)	0	1	2	3
13	Paraguay (PAR)	0	0	1	1
Totals (13 entries)		45	45	45	135

== Participating nations ==
- Argentina (24)
- Aruba (1)
- Bolivia (58)
- Brazil (36)
- Chile (28)
- Colombia (41)
- Ecuador (22)
- Guyana (4)
- Panama (7)
- Paraguay (12)
- Peru (27)
- Suriname (2)
- Uruguay (7)
- Venezuela (26)
