= Melissa Gonzalez (hurdler) =

Colombian American athlete (born 1994)

Personal information
- National team: Colombia
- Citizenship: United States; Colombia
- Born: June 24, 1994 (age 32) El Paso, Texas, U.S.
- Education: University of Texas at Austin
- Height: 1.75 m (5 ft 9 in)
- Spouse: David Blough (m. 2019)
- Relative: Christian Gonzalez (brother)

Sport
- Sport: Athletics
- Events: 400 meters hurdles; 4 × 400 meters relay
- University team: Texas Longhorns

Melissa Blough (née Gonzalez; born June 24, 1994) is a Colombian American athlete specializing in the 400 meters hurdles and 4 × 400 meters relay. A native of El Paso, Texas, U.S., she also holds Colombian citizenship and represents them at international events. She has won several gold medals, mostly in South American competitions and set a personal best of 55.32 seconds at the 2020 Summer Olympics. Gonzalez is married to National Football League (NFL) coach and former player David Blough while her younger brother Christian Gonzalez plays cornerback in the same league.

== International competitions ==
Year	Competition	Venue	Position	Event	Notes
Representing Colombia
2016	South American U23 Championships	Lima, Peru	1st	400 m hurdles	59.26
2016	South American U23 Championships	Lima, Peru	–	4 × 100 m relay	DNF
2016	South American U23 Championships	Lima, Peru	1st	4 × 400 m relay	3:42.19
2017	South American Championships	Asunción, Paraguay	3rd	100 m hurdles	13.42
2017	South American Championships	Asunción, Paraguay	2nd	400 m hurdles	56.29
2017	Bolivarian Games	Santa Marta, Colombia	5th	100 m hurdles	14.21
2017	Bolivarian Games	Santa Marta, Colombia	3rd	400 m hurdles	58.14
2017	Bolivarian Games	Santa Marta, Colombia	3rd	4 × 100 m relay	45.96
2018	South American Games	Cochabamba, Bolivia	2nd	400 m hurdles	56.86
2018	South American Games	Cochabamba, Bolivia	1st	4 × 400 m relay	3:31.87
2018	Central American and Caribbean Games	Barranquilla, Colombia	7th	400 m hurdles	56.57
2018	Central American and Caribbean Games	Barranquilla, Colombia	3rd	4 × 400 m relay	3:32.61
2019	South American Championships	Lima, Peru	1st	400 m hurdles	55.73
2019	South American Championships	Lima, Peru	2nd	4 × 100 m relay	44.97
2019	South American Championships	Lima, Peru	1st	4 × 400 m relay	3:32.81
2019	Pan American Games	Lima, Peru	9th (h)	400 m hurdles	56.78
2019	Pan American Games	Lima, Peru	6th	4 × 400 m relay	3:33.02
2019	World Championships	Doha, Qatar	26th (h)	400 m hurdles	56.49
2021	South American Championships	Guayaquil, Ecuador	1st	400 m hurdles	55.68
2021	South American Championships	Guayaquil, Ecuador	1st	4 × 400 m relay	3:31.04
2021	Olympic Games	Tokyo, Japan	20th (sf)	400 m hurdles	57.47
2022	Ibero-American Championships	La Nucía, Spain	1st	400 m hurdles	54.87
2022	World Championships	Eugene, United States	17th (sf)	400 m hurdles	55.13

== Personal life ==
Gonzalez is a Roman Catholic. She is a citizen of both the United States and Colombia and married American football coach and former quarterback David Blough in March 2019. Her father Hector is 6-foot-9 and played college basketball at the University of Texas at El Paso before playing semiprofessionally in Colombia. Gonzalez has two sisters, Samantha and Lily, and a brother, Christian. Samantha also represents Colombia in international events and was a college All-American in the 4 × 400 meters relay at the University of Miami, while Christian played college football for the Colorado Buffaloes and Oregon Ducks before being drafted by the New England Patriots in the first round of the 2023 NFL draft.
