= Paolo Yurivilca =

Peruvian racewalker

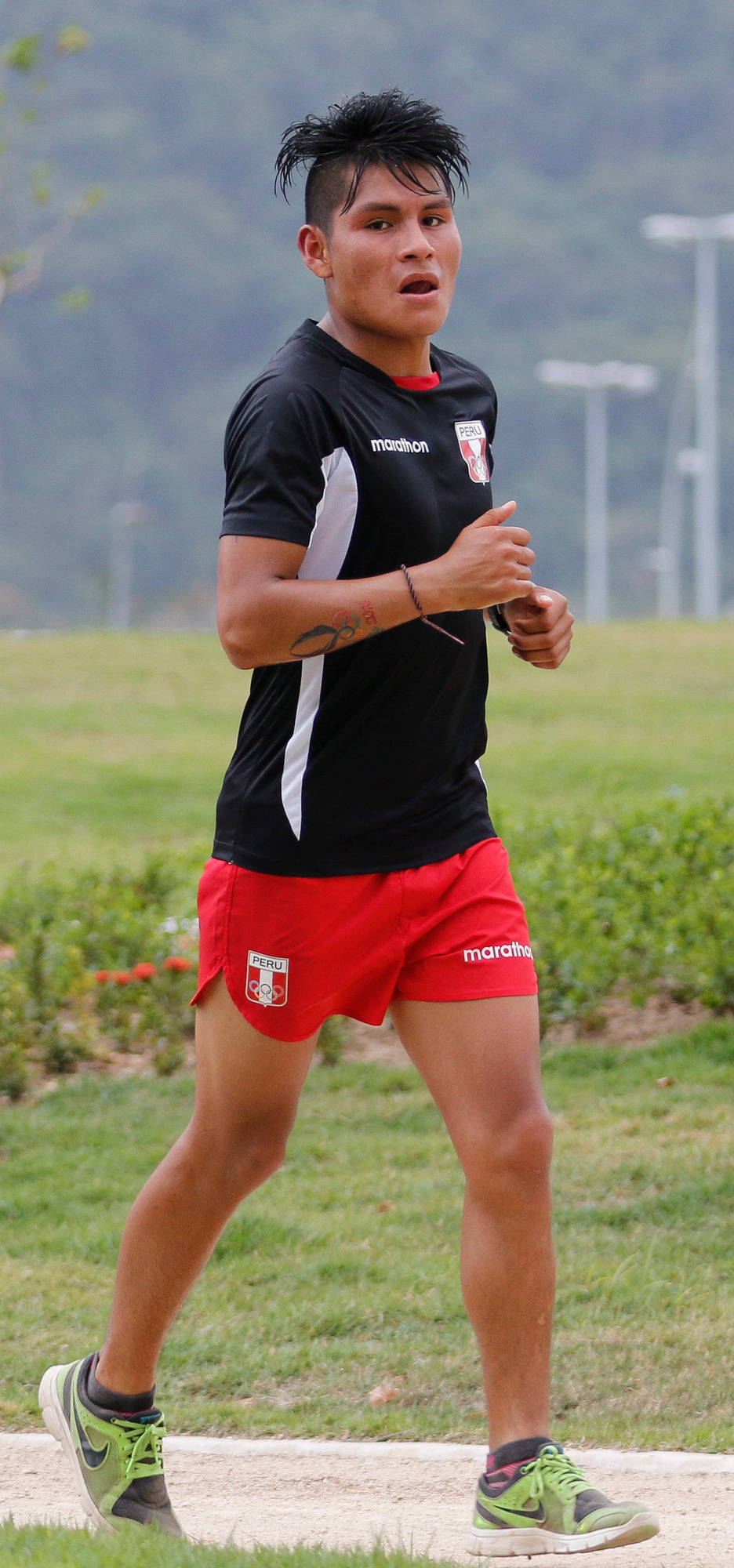
- Yurivilca at the 2016 Olympics

Personal information
- Born: 23 April 1996 (age 30)
- Height: 169 cm (5 ft 7 in)
- Weight: 62 kg (137 lb)

Sport
- Sport: Athletics
- Events: 10 km, 20 km walk
- Coached by: Pedro Canizares

Achievements and titles
- Personal bests: 10 km – 40:47 (2014); 20 km – 1:21:49 (2016)

Paolo Cesar Yurivilca Calderón (born 23 April 1996) is a race walker from Peru. He is from San Agustín de Cajas, Huancayo province. He placed 3rd in the 10km race walk at the World Junior Athletics Championship and 41st in the 20 km race walk event at the 2016 Summer Olympics.

He is currently a Medical student at the Facultad de Medicina UNCP at the Universidad Nacional del Centro del Perú.
