= Zulema Arenas =

Peruvian long-distance runner

Medal record

Women's athletics

Representing Peru

Ibero-American Championships
Silver medal – second place	2014 São Paulo	3000 m s'chase
Bronze medal – third place	2016 Rio de Janeiro	3000 m s'chase

Zulema Arenas (born 15 November 1995) is a Peruvian long-distance runner who specialises in the 3000 metres steeplechase. She broke the South American junior record for the event at the 2014 World Junior Championships in Athletics. She improved this further to 9:53.42 minutes at 2014 Ibero-American Championships in Athletics, winning a silver medal in the process. She holds the Peruvian record with her personal best of 9:52.88 minutes.

== Personal bests ==
- 3000 metres steeplechase – 9:52.88 min (2016)
- 800 metres – 2:10.85 min (2015)
- 1500 metres – 4:19.14 min (2016)
- 3000 metres – 9:37.9 min (2016)
- 5000 metres – 16:48.18 min (2016)
- 2000 metres steeplechase – 6:40.28 min (2012)

All information from All-Athletics

== International competitions ==
Year	Competition	Venue	Position	Event	Notes
2011	South American Cross Country Championships	Asunción, Paraguay	1st	Youth race	10:09.8
2011	South American Cross Country Championships	Asunción, Paraguay	1st	Youth team	4 pts
2011	South American Junior Championships	Medellín, Colombia	2nd	3000 m s'chase	11:05.23
2011	World Youth Championships	Lille, France	8th (h)	2000 m s'chase	6:49.33
2012	South American Cross Country Championships	Lima, Peru	3rd	Youth race	11:05.9
2012	South American Cross Country Championships	Lima, Peru	1st	Youth team	4 pts
2012	South American U23 Championships	São Paulo, Brazil	1st	3000 m s'chase	10:14.52
2012	South American Youth Championships	Mendoza, Argentina	1st	2000 m s'chase	6:40.28
2012	World Junior Championships	Barcelona, Spain	11th (h)	3000 m s'chase	10:47.38
2013	Bolivarian Games	Trujillo, Peru	5th	1500 m	4:24.61
2013	Bolivarian Games	Trujillo, Peru	5th	3000 m s'chase	10:05.53
2013	South American Junior Championships	Resistencia, Argentina	2nd	1500 m	4:29.05
2013	South American Junior Championships	Resistencia, Argentina	1st	3000 m	9:51.05
2013	South American Junior Championships	Resistencia, Argentina	1st	3000 m s'chase	10:33.66 CR
2013	South American Championships	Cartagena, Colombia	4th	3000 m s'chase	10:12.72 NR
2014	South American U23 Championships	Montevideo, Uruguay	3rd	1500 m	4:25.30
2014	South American U23 Championships	Montevideo, Uruguay	1st	3000 m s'chase	10:06.25 CR
2014	World Junior Championships	Eugene, United States	6th	3000 m s'chase	9:59.38
2014	Ibero-American Championships	São Paulo, Brazil	2nd	3000 m s'chase	9:53.42 AJR
2014	Pan American Sports Festival	Mexico City, Mexico	1st	3000 m s'chase	10:21.05
2016	Ibero-American Championships	Rio de Janeiro, Brazil	8th	1500 m	4:19.14
2016	Ibero-American Championships	Rio de Janeiro, Brazil	3rd	3000 m s'chase	9:56.04
2017	South American Championships	Asunción, Paraguay	3rd	1500 m	4:23.37
2017	South American Championships	Asunción, Paraguay	2nd	3000 m s'chase	10:09.20
2017	Bolivarian Games	Santa Marta, Colombia	3rd	1500 m	4:19.03
2017	Bolivarian Games	Santa Marta, Colombia	1st	3000 m s'chase	9:52.32
