= Evelyn Rivera =

Colombian sprinter (born 1997)

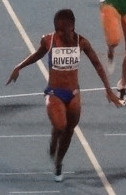
- Evelyn Rivera in 2016

Personal information
- Full name: Evelyn Rivera Banquett
- Born: 3 December 1997 (age 28)
- Height: 1.57 m (5 ft 2 in)
- Weight: 48 kg (106 lb)

Sport
- Country: Colombia
- Sport: Athletics
- Events: 100 metres; 200 metres; 4×100 metres
Medal record
Representing Colombia
Women's athletics
Ibero-American Championships
Silver medal – second place	2024 Cuiabá	4×100 m relay
South American Games
Gold medal – first place	2022 Asunción	4×100 m relay
Bolivarian Games
Gold medal – first place	2022 Valledupar	4×100 m relay
World U20 Championships
Silver medal – second place	2016 Bydgoszcz	200 m

Evelyn Rivera Banquett (born 3 December 1997) is a Colombian sprinter. She competed in the women's 100 metres event at the 2016 Summer Olympics.
