= Romina Cifuentes =

Ecuadorian sprinter

Personal information
- Nationality: Ecuadorian
- Born: 8 February 1999 (age 26)

Sport
- Sport: Sprinting
- Event: 4 × 100 metres

Romina Cifuentes (born 8 February 1999) is an Ecuadorian sprinter. She competed in the women's 4 × 100 metres relay at the 2017 World Championships in Athletics.
