= Carlos Perlaza =

Colombian footballer (born 1983)

Personal information
- Full name: Carlos Andrés Perlaza Ortiz
- Date of birth: 29 October 1983 (age 43)
- Place of birth: Cali, Colombia
- Height: 1.80 m (5 ft 11 in)
- Position: Forward

Senior career*
Years	Team	Apps	(Gls)
2005–2006	Atlético Huila	8	(0)
2007	Deportivo Cali		
2008	Cobresal	7	(1)
- * Club domestic league appearances and goals

Carlos Andrés Perlaza Ortiz (born 29 October 1983) is a Colombian former footballer who played as a forward.

== Career ==
In his homeland, he played for Atlético Huila.

After a stint with Deportivo Cali, he moved to Chile in 2007 and trialed with Lota Schwager. The next year, he played for Chilean Primera División club Cobresal.

== Post-retirement ==
He became a football agent, serving as the representative of players like Linda Caicedo.
