= Matthew Burton =

Matthew Burton may refer to:

- Matthew Burton (Australian footballer) (born 1970), Australian rules footballer
- Matthew Burton (English footballer) (1897–1940), inter-war English footballer
- Matthew Burton (long jumper) (born 1987), British long jumper and champion at the 2013 British Indoor Athletics Championships
- Matt Burton (born 2000), Australian rugby league player
