= 2013 World Youth Championships in Athletics – Girls' triple jump =

Girls' triple jump at the 2013 World Youth Championships in Athletics
- Venue: RSC Olimpiyskiy
- Dates: 10 July (qualification); 11 July (final)
- Competitors: 30
- Winning distance: 13.75 WYL

Medalists
gold medal	Florentina Marincu	Romania
silver medal	Wang Rong	China
bronze medal	Keturah Orji	United States

The girls' triple jump at the 2013 World Youth Championships in Athletics was held on 10 and 12 July.

== Medalists ==
Gold	Silver	Bronze
Florentina Marincu; Romania	Wang Rong; China	Keturah Orji; United States

== Records ==
Prior to the competition, the following records were as follows.

World Youth Best	Huang Qiuyan (CHN)	14.57	Shanghai, China	19 October 1997
Championship Record	Cristine Spataru (ROU)	13.86	Sherbrooke, Canada	11 July 2003
World Youth Leading	Wang Rong (CHN)	13.65	Sydney, Australia	18 January 2013

== Qualification ==
Qualification rule: 12.80 (Q) or at least 12 best performers (q) qualified.

Rank	Group	Name	Nationality	#1	#2	#3	Result	Notes
1	A	Florentina Marincu	Romania	13.69			13.69	Q, WYL
2	B	Keturah Orji	United States	13.43			13.43	Q, PB
3	B	Núbia Soares	Brazil	13.25			13.25	Q
4	A	Wang Rong	China	13.21			13.21	Q
5	B	Benedetta Cuneo	Italy	13.13			13.13	Q
6	B	Tetyana Holovchuk	Ukraine	x	13.01		13.01	Q, PB
7	A	Marie-Josée Ebwea-Bile	France	x	12.98		12.98	Q
8	A	Isabella Marten	Germany	12.76	12.75	12.86	12.86	Q
9	B	Adrianna Szóstak	Poland	12.80			12.80	Q, PB
9	B	Zhao Jing	China	x	12.80		12.80	Q
11	A	Noor Nadia Shahidatun	Malaysia	x	x	12.59	12.59	q
12	A	Kristina Malaya	Russia	12.24	12.33	12.57	12.57	q
13	B	Tamara Moncrieffe	Jamaica	12.11	12.41	12.48	12.48	
14	B	Marine Vidal	France	12.42	x	12.22	12.42	
15	B	Kirthana Ramasamy	Malaysia	12.10	12.09	12.37	12.37	
16	B	Zinzi Chabangu	South Africa	12.12	x	12.36	12.36	
17	B	Jennifer Canchingre	Ecuador	11.92	x	12.32	12.32	
18	A	Kateryna Popova	Ukraine	x	12.26	12.15	12.26	
19	A	Kawther Selmi	Algeria	12.21	12.15	x	12.21	
20	B	Neli Antonovici	Moldova	12.20	x	12.06	12.20	PB
21	A	Adriana Chila	Ecuador	12.13	x	12.19	12.19	
22	B	Anca Burcă	Romania	x	11.83	12.19	12.19	
23	B	Daisy Isa	Bulgaria	11.77	12.18	11.78	12.18	
24	A	Eva Mustar	Slovenia	x	x	12.09	12.09	
25	A	Dalmira Kurtov	Croatia	x	12.02	11.73	12.02	
26	A	Deborah Galong	Suriname	11.44	11.80	11.96	11.96	
27	A	Anna Gorodkova	Kazakhstan	x	11.88	11.91	11.91	
28	A	Pascaline Boro	Burkina Faso	11.73	11.90	11.73	11.90	
29	A	Anna Tyan	Uzbekistan	11.75	11.59	x	11.75	
	B	Veronica Ugeh Kasie	Nigeria	x			NM	

== Final ==
Rank	Name	Nationality	#1	#2	#3	#4	#5	#6	Result	Notes
1st place, gold medalist(s)	Florentina Marincu	Romania	x	13.75	x	x	x	x	13.75	WYL
2nd place, silver medalist(s)	Wang Rong	China	13.41	13.69	13.62	13.40	13.57	12.97	13.69	
3rd place, bronze medalist(s)	Keturah Orji	United States	12.94	13.44	13.61	x	13.09	13.69	13.69	PB
4	Núbia Soares	Brazil	13.60	13.52	x	13.18	x	x	13.60	PB
5	Marie-Josée Ebwea-Bile	France	13.31	12.07	12.86	x	x	x	13.31	PB
6	Benedetta Cuneo	Italy	12.98	12.88	x	13.11	12.56	13.27	13.27	PB
7	Tetyana Holovchuk	Ukraine	12.61	13.13	x	12.85	12.80	12.66	13.13	PB
8	Zhao Jing	China	12.70	13.03	x	13.01	x	x	13.03	
9	Kristina Malaya	Russia	12.55	12.84	12.82				12.84	
10	Adrianna Szóstak	Poland	12.39	12.45	12.83				12.83	PB
11	Isabella Marten	Germany	12.42	12.63	12.69				12.69	
	Noor Nadia Shahidatun	Malaysia	x	x	x				NM	
