= Yasmin Miller =

British track and field athlete (born 1995)

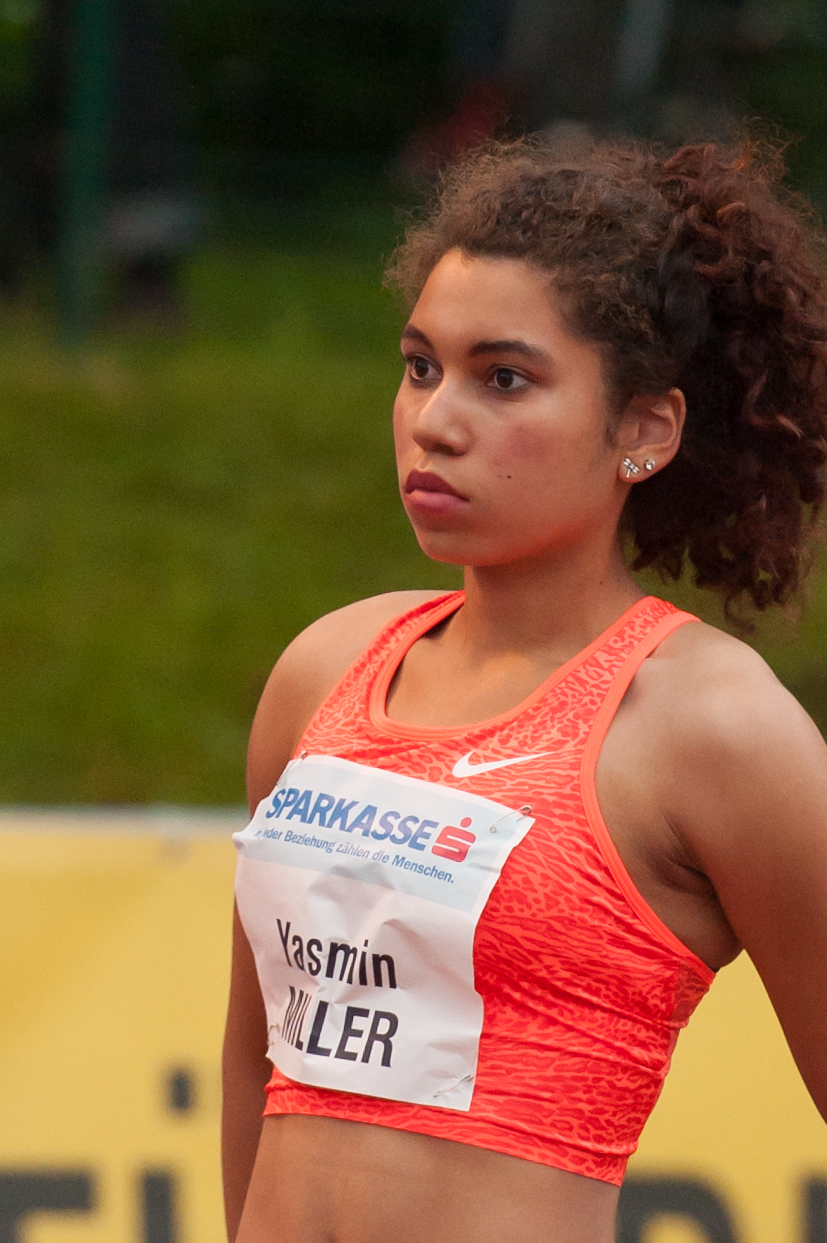
- Miller in 2015

Personal information
- Nationality: British
- Citizenship: United Kingdom
- Born: 24 May 1995 (age 31)
- Home town: Derby, England
Medal record
Representing Great Britain
Women's athletics
European Athletics Junior Championships
Gold medal – first place	2013 Rieti	100 m hurdles
Representing England
Commonwealth Youth Games
Gold medal – first place	2011 Douglas	100 m hurdles
Gold medal – first place	2011 Douglas	4 × 100 m relay
British Indoor Athletics Championships
Bronze medal – third place	2013 Sheffield	60 m hurdles
Bronze medal – third place	2015 Sheffield	60 m hurdles
Silver medal – second place	2018 Birmingham	60 m hurdles
Gold medal – first place	2020 Glasgow	60 m hurdles
British Athletics Championships
Silver medal – second place	2017 Birmingham	100 m hurdles
Bronze medal – third place	2019 Birmingham	100 m hurdles

Yasmin Miller (born 24 May 1995) is a British track and field athlete who has competed in sprint and hurdles events. She competed in the 100 metres hurdles for Great Britain at the age of 16 at the 2011 World Youth Championships in Athletics. She won the same event at that year's Commonwealth Youth Games and was also a member of the winning 4 × 100 metres relay team. She repeated the latter success in the 2013 European Athletics Junior Championships. Miller has enjoyed some success at national-level hurdling, winning two bronze, a silver and gold in the 60 metres hurdles at the British Indoor Athletics Championships and a silver and a bronze in the 100 m hurdles at the British Athletics Championships.

== Career ==
=== Youth career ===
Miller was born on 24 May 1995. She attended school in Derbyshire. At the age of 16 she competed for Great Britain at the 2011 World Youth Championships in Athletics in Lille, France. She failed to progress from the semi-finals in the 100 m hurdles event. In September of that year Miller won gold in the same event at the 2011 Commonwealth Youth Games. In the same competition she won gold in the 4 × 100 m relay with Dina Asher-Smith, Sophie Papps and Jazmin Sawyers.

Miller was part of the gold medal–winning British team in the 4 × 100 m relay at the 2013 European Athletics Junior Championships in Rieti, Italy, alongside Asher-Smith, Steffi Wilson and Desiree Henry. Miller also competed in the 100 m hurdles at the same event but did not progress beyond the heats. That year she was named sportsperson of the year at the 2013 Derbyshire Schools' Sports Association awards. Miller came fourth in the 100 m hurdles at the 2014 World Junior Championships in Athletics in Eugene, Oregon, US; in the same year she won gold in the England Athletics under 20s 100 m hurdles. Miller competed in the 100 m hurdles at the 2015 European Athletics U23 Championships in Tallinn, Estonia, but did not progress beyond the heats. She placed fourth in the 100 metres hurdles at the 2017 European Athletics U23 Championships at Bydgoszcz, Poland.

Miller represented the university at the British Universities and Colleges Sport Nationals. At the 2017 indoors event she set a new competition record in the 60 m hurdles semi-final but came second in the final by 0.01 seconds. Later that year, in the outdoor event, she won the 100 m hurdles final. In September 2017 Miller was due to return to the university to study for a Master of Laws degree in international commercial law.

=== Senior career ===
Miller competed as a senior at the 2013 British Indoor Athletics Championships, placing third in the 60 m hurdles. She repeated this position at the 2015 British Indoor Athletics Championships. In the 2017 British Athletics Championships she came second in the 100 m hurdles.

Miller missed out on selection for the 2018 Commonwealth Games in 2017 by 0.01 seconds, running the 60 m hurdles in 8.16, when a time of 8.15 was required. In 2021 she described the incident as the "rock-bottom" of her athletics career. She afterwards saw a sports psychologist. In the 2017 England Athletics Senior Track & Field Championships Miller won first place in the 100 m hurdles. She placed second in the 60 m hurdles at the 2018 British Indoor Athletics Championships and third in the 100 m hurdles at the 2019 British Athletics Championships.

Miller won first place in the 60 m hurdles at the 2020 British Indoor Athletics Championships.
