= 2011 World Youth Championships in Athletics – Girls' 100 metres hurdles =

Girls' 100 metres hurdles at the 2011 World Youth Championships in Athletics
- Venue: Stadium Lille Métropole
- Dates: 6 July (heats); 7 July (semifinal & final)
- Competitors: 39
- Winning time: 13.11 WYL

Medalists
gold medal	Trinity Wilson	United States
silver medal	Noemi Zbären	Switzerland
bronze medal	Kendell Williams	United States

The girls' 100 metres hurdles at the 2011 World Youth Championships in Athletics was held at the Stadium Lille Métropole on 6 and 7 July.

== Medalists ==
Gold	Silver	Bronze
Trinity Wilson; United States	Noemi Zbären; Switzerland	Kendell Williams; United States

== Records ==
Prior to the competition, the following records were as follows.

World Youth Best	Adrianna Lamalle (FRA)	13.08	Bydgoszcz, Poland	18 July 1999
Championship Record	Adrianna Lamalle (FRA)	13.08	Bydgoszcz, Poland	18 July 1999
World Youth Leading	Noemi Zbären (SUI)	13.35	Schweinfurt, Germany	18 June 2011

== Heats ==
Qualification rule: first 4 of each heat (Q) plus the 4 fastest times (q) qualified.

=== Heat 1 ===
Rank	Lane	Name	Nationality	Time	Notes
1	4	Trinity Wilson	United States	13.59	Q
2	3	Sandra Gottschalk	Germany	13.73	Q
3	6	Maryke Brits	South Africa	14.04	Q
4	2	Ikumi Iida	Japan	14.16	Q, PB
5	8	Christine MacNeill	Canada	14.30	q
6	7	Chrystie Lange	France	14.41	
7	1	Polina Halkina	Ukraine	14.74	
8	5	Diana Bazalar	Peru	14.85	

=== Heat 2 ===
Rank	Lane	Name	Nationality	Time	Notes
1	1	Yasmin Miller	Great Britain	13.78	Q
2	5	Sarah Missinne	Belgium	14.03	Q
3	6	Katarzyna Siewruk	Poland	14.05	Q, PB
4	7	Jatta-Juulia Hanski	Finland	14.11	Q
5	2	Maria Paniz	Italy	14.14	q
6	4	Anastasia Nikolaeva	Russia	14.20	q
7	3	Daria Calineac	Romania	14.61	
8	8	Natalia Pinzón	Colombia	15.13	

=== Heat 3 ===
Rank	Lane	Name	Nationality	Time	Notes
1	1	Alexandra Burghardt	Germany	13.82	Q
2	6	Megan Simmonds	Jamaica	13.90	Q
3	4	Lucie Koudelová	Czech Republic	14.18	Q
4	5	Zuzanna Rybarczyk	Poland	14.26	Q
5	3	Rina Hagita	Japan	14.26	q, SB
6	7	Aina Fornés	Spain	14.37	
7	8	Rebecca Palandri	Italy	14.42	
8	2	Hui-Wen Cheng	Chinese Taipei	14.94	

=== Heat 4 ===
Rank	Lane	Name	Nationality	Time	Notes
1	4	Kendell Wilson	United States	13.60	Q
2	8	Chrisdale McCarthy	Jamaica	13.85	Q
3	1	Nicole Setterington	Canada	14.38	Q
4	5	Yuke Wang	China	14.39	Q, SB
5	7	Laura-Maria Oja	Estonia	14.45	
6	3	Shakera Hall	Barbados	14.66	
7	6	Yuliana Angulo	Ecuador	14.78	
8	2	Nawel Abazi	Algeria	14.89	PB

=== Heat 5 ===
Rank	Lane	Name	Nationality	Time	Notes
1	3	Noemi Zbären	Switzerland	13.31	Q, WYL
2	2	Christelle Vertueux	France	13.86	Q, PB
3	6	Teresa Errandonea	Spain	14.14	Q
4	7	Karolina Hlavatá	Czech Republic	14.18	Q
5	1	Georgina Tamez	Mexico	14.34	
6	4	Rafaela Vitorino	Portugal	14.46	
7	5	Lucia Mokrášová	Slovakia	14.84	

== Semifinals ==
Qualification rule: first 2 of each heat (Q) plus the 2 fastest times (q) qualified.

=== Heat 1 ===
Rank	Lane	Name	Nationality	Time	Notes
1	5	Noemi Zbären	Switzerland	13.60	Q
2	3	Chrisdale McCarthy	Jamaica	13.92	Q
3	6	Sandra Gottschalk	Germany	13.93	q
4	4	Katarzyna Siewruk	Poland	14.17	
5	8	Teresa Errandonea	Spain	14.20	
6	1	Rina Hagita	Japan	14.35	
7	7	Karolina Hlavatá	Czech Republic	14.62	
8	2	Yuke Wang	China	14.79	

=== Heat 2 ===
Rank	Lane	Name	Nationality	Time	Notes
1	5	Trinity Wilson	United States	13.37	Q, PB
2	3	Alexandra Burghardt	Germany	13.68	Q
3	4	Christelle Vertueux	France	13.93	q
4	8	Ikumi Iida	Japan	13.96	PB
5	6	Maryke Brits	South Africa	14.06	
6	7	Lucie Koudelová	Czech Republic	14.07	
7	1	Christine MacNeill	Canada	14.07	
8	2	Zuzanna Rybarczyk	Poland	14.12	

=== Heat 3 ===
Rank	Lane	Name	Nationality	Time	Notes
1	3	Kendell Williams	United States	13.70	Q
2	6	Megan Simmonds	Jamaica	13.91	Q
3	1	Anastasia Nikolaeva	Russia	14.18	
4	7	Nicole Setterington	Canada	14.23	
5	4	Yasmin Miller	Great Britain	14.25	
6	5	Sarah Missinne	Belgium	14.46	
7	2	Maria Paniz	Italy	14.52	
8	8	Jatta-Juulia Hanski	Finland	14.57	

== Final ==
Rank	Lane	Name	Nationality	Time	Notes
1st place, gold medalist(s)	4	Trinity Wilson	United States	13.11	WYL
2nd place, silver medalist(s)	5	Noemi Zbären	Switzerland	13.17	PB
3rd place, bronze medalist(s)	6	Kendell Williams	United States	13.28	PB
4	3	Alexandra Burghardt	Germany	13.42	PB
5	8	Chrisdale McCarthy	Jamaica	13.55	PB
6	7	Megan Simmonds	Jamaica	13.78	
7	1	Sandra Gottschalk	Germany	13.79	
8	2	Christelle Vertueux	France	13.82	PB
