= Kendell Williams =

American track and field athlete (born 1995)

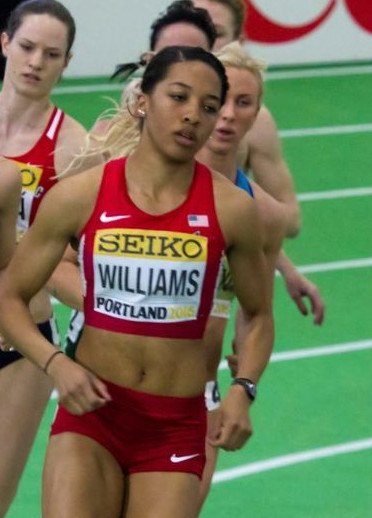
- Kendell Williams at the 2016 IAAF World Indoor Championships

Personal information
- Born: June 14, 1995 (age 31) Arlington, Virginia, U.S.
- Education: University of Georgia
- Height: 5 ft 10 in (178 cm)
- Weight: 148 lb (67 kg)

Sport
- Sport: Track and field, Track,
- Events: Heptathlon, pentathlon, 100 meters hurdles
- College team: Georgia Bulldogs
- Turned pro: 2017
- Coached by: Petros Kyprianou
Medal record
Women's athletics
Representing the United States
World Indoor Championships
Bronze medal – third place	2022 Belgrade	Pentathlon
World Junior Championships
Gold medal – first place	2014 Eugene	100 m hurdles
Pan American Junior Championships
Silver medal – second place	2013 Medellín	Heptathlon
World Youth Championships
Bronze medal – third place	2011 Lille	100 m hurdles

Kendell Williams (born June 14, 1995) is an American track and field athlete competing in the combined events. She represented her country at the 2016 World Indoor Championships finishing sixth. Williams qualified to represent the United States at the 2020 Summer Olympics. She won the bronze medal at the 2022 World Indoor Championships in Belgrade.

Williams' brother is fellow American track and field athlete Devon Williams.

== NCAA ==
Kendell Williams ends her senior year (2017) as a seven time NCAA Division I Champion. U.S. Track & Field and Cross Country Coaches Association All-American. Kendell won the heptathlon at 2016 NCAA Division I Outdoor Track and Field Championships, she scored 6225 points. Kendall won the pentathlon at 2016 NCAA Division I Indoor Track and Field Championships, she scored 4703 points and 2014 NCAA Division I Indoor Track and Field Championships scoring 4635 points. Kendell won the pentathlon at 2015 and 2016 SEC Indoor Championships and 2014 heptathlon at SEC Outdoor Championships. Kendell leaves the NCAA as the only Athlete to win the same event 4 years in a row. (The Indoor Pentathlon) Kendell still holds the National record (4703 pts) Kendell won the NCAA Div 1 Heptathlon 3 times.

While at Georgia, she won the Honda Sports Award as the nation's best female track and field competitor in 2017.

== Competition record ==
Year	Competition	Venue	Position	Event	Result
Representing the United States
2011	World Youth Championships	Lille, France	3rd	100 m hurdles (76.2 cm)	13.28 s
2011	World Youth Championships	Lille, France	11th	Heptathlon (youth)	5101 pts
2012	World Junior Championships	Barcelona, Spain	8th	Heptathlon	5578 pts
2013	Pan American Junior Championships	Medellín, Colombia	2nd	Heptathlon	5572 pts
2014	World Junior Championships	Eugene, United States	1st	100 m hurdles	12.89 s
2016	World Indoor Championships	Portland, United States	6th	Pentathlon	4586 pts
2016	Olympic Games	Rio de Janeiro, Brazil	17th	Heptathlon	6221 pts
2017	World Championships	London, United Kingdom	12th	Heptathlon	6220 pts
2018	World Indoor Championships	Birmingham, United Kingdom	9th	Pentathlon	4414 pts
2019	World Championships	Doha, Qatar	5th	Heptathlon	6415 pts
2021	Olympic Games	Tokyo, Japan	5th	Heptathlon	6508 pts
2022	World Indoor Championships	Belgrade Serbia	3rd	Pentathlon	4680 pts
2022	World Championships	Eugene, United States	–	Heptathlon	DNF

== Personal bests ==
Outdoor
- 200 meters – 23.50 (+0.2 m/s, Sacramento 2017)
- 800 meters – 2:15.31 (Eugene 2016)
- 100 meters hurdles – 12.58 (+0.4 m/s, Doha 2019)
- High jump – 1.85 (Albuquerque 2012)
- Long jump – 6.71 (+1.1 m/s Des Moines 2019)
- Shot put – 13.41 (Des Moines 2019)
- Javelin throw – 46.48 (Eugene 2017)
- Heptathlon – 6610 (Des Moines 2019)
Indoor
- 800 meters – 2:15.61 (College Station 2017)
- 60 meters hurdles – 8.03 (College Station 2017)
- High jump – 1.88 (Albuquerque 2014)
- Long jump – 6.54 (Blacksburg 2015)
- Shot put – 13.55 (Birmingham 2016)
- Pentathlon – 4703 (Birmingham 2016)
