= Athletics at the 2018 South American Games – Results =

These are the full results of the athletics competition at the 2018 South American Games which took place between 5 and 8 June 2018, in Cochabamba, Bolivia.

== Men's results ==
=== 100 meters ===
Heats – 6 June
Wind:
Heat 1: -1.1 m/s, Heat 2: -0.1 m/s

Rank	Heat	Name	Nationality	Time	Notes
1	2	Álex Quiñónez	Ecuador	10.11	Q
2	2	Alonso Edward	Panama	10.14	Q
3	1	Jhonny Rentería	Colombia	10.18	Q, PB
4	1	Vitor Hugo dos Santos	Brazil	10.24	Q
5	2	Diego Palomeque	Colombia	10.30	Q
6	2	Aldemir da Silva Júnior	Brazil	10.34	q
7	2	Alexis Nieves	Venezuela	10.35	q
8	2	Arturo Ramírez	Venezuela	10.45	
9	1	Andy Martínez	Peru	10.48	Q
10	2	Christopher Ortiz	Paraguay	10.49	
11	1	Enrique Polanco	Chile	10.52	
12	1	Akeem Stewart	Guyana	10.52	
13	1	Pablo Roberto Abán	Bolivia	10.59	
14	1	Mateo Edward	Panama	10.62	
15	1	Jesús Cáceres	Paraguay	10.63	
16	2	Roberto Bustillo	Bolivia	10.90	

Final – 6 June
Wind:
-0.7 m/s

Rank	Lane	Name	Nationality	Time	Notes
1st place, gold medalist(s)	5	Alonso Edward	Panama	10.01	GR
2nd place, silver medalist(s)	4	Álex Quiñónez	Ecuador	10.09	
3rd place, bronze medalist(s)	6	Vitor Hugo dos Santos	Brazil	10.12	
4	3	Jhonny Rentería	Colombia	10.25	
5	2	Aldemir da Silva Júnior	Brazil	10.32	
6	1	Alexis Nieves	Venezuela	10.33	
7	7	Diego Palomeque	Colombia	10.39	
8	8	Andy Martínez	Peru	10.54	

=== 200 meters ===
Heats – 7 June
Wind:
Heat 1: -1.0 m/s, Heat 2: +0.7 m/s

Rank	Heat	Name	Nationality	Time	Notes
1	2	Aldemir da Silva Júnior	Brazil	20.23	Q
2	1	Álex Quiñónez	Ecuador	20.43	Q
3	2	Bernardo Baloyes	Colombia	20.44	Q
4	1	Vitor Hugo dos Santos	Brazil	20.49	Q
5	2	Winston George	Guyana	20.66	Q
6	1	Virgilio Griggs	Panama	20.89	Q
7	2	Rafael Vásquez	Venezuela	20.92	q
8	1	Enzo Faulbaum	Chile	20.97	q
9	1	Fredy Maidana	Paraguay	21.16	
10	2	Akeem Stewart	Guyana	21.30	
11	2	Rodrigo Anguita	Chile	21.44	
12	2	Julian Vargas	Bolivia	21.50	
13	1	Nilo Dure	Paraguay	21.59	
14	1	Roberto Bustillo	Bolivia	21.86	
	1	Diego Palomeque	Colombia	DNF	

Final – 7 June
Wind:
-0.5 m/s

Rank	Lane	Name	Nationality	Time	Notes
1st place, gold medalist(s)	5	Álex Quiñónez	Ecuador	19.93	
2nd place, silver medalist(s)	6	Vitor Hugo dos Santos	Brazil	20.21	
3rd place, bronze medalist(s)	3	Bernardo Baloyes	Colombia	20.28	
4	4	Aldemir da Silva Júnior	Brazil	20.30	
5	8	Winston George	Guyana	20.55	
6	7	Virjilio Griggs	Panama	20.59	
7	2	Enzo Faulbaum	Chile	21.17	
	1	Rafael Vásquez	Venezuela	DNF	

=== 400 meters ===
Heats – 5 June

Rank	Heat	Name	Nationality	Time	Notes
1	1	Winston George	Guyana	46.70	Q
2	1	Hederson Estefani	Brazil	47.05	Q
3	1	Yilmar Herrera	Colombia	47.31	Q
4	2	Lucas Carvalho	Brazil	47.58	Q
5	1	Fernando Copa	Bolivia	47.62	q
6	1	Kelvis Padrino	Venezuela	47.72	q
7	1	Mateo Pascual	Uruguay	47.87	
8	2	Marco Vilca	Peru	48.36	Q
9	2	José Melendez	Venezuela	48.38	Q
10	2	Jhon Solís	Colombia	48.53	
11	2	Pablo Cuéllar	Bolivia	49.91	

Final – 6 June

Rank	Lane	Name	Nationality	Time	Notes
1st place, gold medalist(s)	6	Lucas Carvalho	Brazil	45.61	
2nd place, silver medalist(s)	8	Yilmar Herrera	Colombia	45.64	
3rd place, bronze medalist(s)	4	Winston George	Guyana	45.67	
4	5	Hederson Estefani	Brazil	46.15	
5	7	José Melendez	Venezuela	46.62	
6	2	Fernando Copa	Bolivia	47.12	NR
7	1	Kelvis Padrino	Venezuela	47.93	
8	3	Marco Vilca	Peru	48.04	

=== 800 meters ===
8 June

Rank	Name	Nationality	Time	Notes
1st place, gold medalist(s)	Lucirio Antonio Garrido	Venezuela	1:51.15	
2nd place, silver medalist(s)	Jelssin Robledo	Colombia	1:51.50	
3rd place, bronze medalist(s)	Leandro Paris	Argentina	1:51.94	
4	Marco Vilca	Peru	1:52.03	
5	Cristofer Jarpa	Chile	1:55.18	
6	Rafael Muñoz	Chile	1:57.03	
7	Arnaldo Pérez	Bolivia	1:59.17	
8	Deimar Sánchez	Bolivia	2:00.01	
	Rafith Rodríguez	Colombia	DNF	

=== 1500 meters ===
6 June

Rank	Name	Nationality	Time	Notes
1st place, gold medalist(s)	Carlos Díaz	Chile	3:50.82	
2nd place, silver medalist(s)	Willy Canchanya	Peru	3:51.23	
3rd place, bronze medalist(s)	Federico Bruno	Argentina	3:54.34	
4	Freddy Espinosa	Colombia	3:55.50	
5	Carlos Hernández	Colombia	3:56.18	
6	Marvin Blanco	Venezuela	3:58.69	
7	Limber Apaza	Bolivia	3:59.20	
8	Ruben Arando	Bolivia	4:00.48	
9	Ruben Palma	Chile	4:05.23	
	Lucirio Antonio Garrido	Venezuela	DNF	
	Mario Bazán	Peru	DNF	

=== 5000 meters ===
5 June

Rank	Name	Nationality	Time	Notes
1st place, gold medalist(s)	Bayron Piedra	Ecuador	14:32.47	
2nd place, silver medalist(s)	Vidal Basco	Bolivia	14:32.58	
3rd place, bronze medalist(s)	Luis Ostos	Peru	14:32.79	
4	Daniel Toroya	Bolivia	14:45.01	
5	Iván Darío González	Colombia	15:14.69	
6	Víctor Aravena	Chile	15:26.85	
7	Yerson Orellana	Peru	15:29.28	
	Javier Carriqueo	Argentina	DNF	
	Derlys Ayala	Paraguay	DNF	
	Mauricio González	Colombia	DNS	

=== 10,000 meters ===
8 June

Rank	Name	Nationality	Time	Notes
1st place, gold medalist(s)	Iván Darío González	Colombia	30:25.10	
2nd place, silver medalist(s)	Jorge César Fernández	Bolivia	30:37.29	
3rd place, bronze medalist(s)	Bayron Piedra	Ecuador	30:51.74	
4	Segundo Jami	Ecuador	31:00.62	
5	Juan Carlos Huiza	Bolivia	31:10.08	
6	Javier Carriqueo	Argentina	32:26.63	
7	Enzo Yañez	Chile	32:27.74	
8	Ulises Martín	Peru	33:28.94	
	Luis Ostos	Peru	DQ	R144.3a

=== 110 meters hurdles ===
Heats – 6 June
Wind:
Heat 1: -0.5 m/s, Heat 2: -0.2 m/s

Rank	Heat	Name	Nationality	Time	Notes
1	2	Eduardo de Deus	Brazil	13.57	Q
2	1	Fanor Escobar	Colombia	13.62	Q
3	1	Javier McFarlane	Peru	13.97	Q
4	2	Juan Pablo Germain	Chile	14.00	Q
5	1	Éder Antônio Souza	Brazil	14.01	Q
5	2	Juan Carlos Moreno	Colombia	14.01	Q
7	1	Agustín Carrera	Argentina	14.15	q
7	2	Mauricio Garrido	Peru	14.15	q
9	1	Mauricio Sandoval	Bolivia	14.92	
10	2	Ricardo Cortez	Bolivia	15.04	

Final – 6 June
Wind:
+0.5 m/s

Rank	Lane	Name	Nationality	Time	Notes
1st place, gold medalist(s)	4	Eduardo de Deus	Brazil	13.44	
2nd place, silver medalist(s)	5	Fanor Escobar	Colombia	13.61	
3rd place, bronze medalist(s)	7	Juan Carlos Moreno	Colombia	13.68	
4	8	Éder Antônio Souza	Brazil	13.70	
5	3	Javier McFarlane	Peru	13.75	
6	6	Juan Pablo Germain	Chile	13.89	
7	1	Agustín Carrera	Argentina	14.00	
	2	Mauricio Garrido	Peru	DNS	

=== 400 meters hurdles ===
Heats – 6 June

Rank	Heat	Name	Nationality	Time	Notes
1	2	Márcio Teles	Brazil	50.90	Q
2	1	Hederson Estefani	Brazil	51.57	Q
3	2	Andrés Silva	Uruguay	51.62	Q
4	2	Emerson Alejandro Chala	Ecuador	51.79	Q
5	1	Alfredo Sepúlveda	Chile	51.94	Q
6	1	Guillermo Ruggeri	Argentina	52.81	Q
7	1	Fanor Escobar	Colombia	54.45	q
8	1	Álvaro Cruz	Bolivia	55.56	q
9	2	Wilson Bello	Venezuela	59.18	

Final – 7 June

Rank	Lane	Name	Nationality	Time	Notes
1st place, gold medalist(s)	7	Guillermo Ruggeri	Argentina	49.28	GR, NR
2nd place, silver medalist(s)	2	Alfredo Sepúlveda	Chile	49.62	NR
3rd place, bronze medalist(s)	4	Márcio Teles	Brazil	49.78	
4	3	Andrés Silva	Uruguay	50.29	
5	6	Emerson Alejandro Chala	Ecuador	51.04	
6	8	Álvaro Cruz	Bolivia	54.73	
	1	Fanor Escobar	Colombia	DNS	
	5	Hederson Estefani	Brazil	DNS	

=== 3000 meters steeplechase ===
8 June

Rank	Name	Nationality	Time	Notes
1st place, gold medalist(s)	Yuri Labra	Peru	9:01.95	
2nd place, silver medalist(s)	Gerard Giraldo	Colombia	9:01.99	
3rd place, bronze medalist(s)	Yessy Apaza	Bolivia	9:21.81	
4	José Peña	Venezuela	9:30.00	
5	Jean Manuel Pérez	Bolivia	10:00.44	
6	Derlys Ayala	Paraguay	10:58.95	
	Mario Bazán	Peru	DNF	
	Marvin Blanco	Venezuela	DNF	

=== 4 × 100 meters relay ===
7 June

Rank	Lane	Nation	Competitors	Time	Notes
1st place, gold medalist(s)	4	Colombia	Jhonny Rentería, Diego Palomeque, Jessi Chará, Bernardo Baloyes	38.97	NR
2nd place, silver medalist(s)	3	Venezuela	Alberto Aguilar, Rafael Vásquez, Alexis Nieves, Arturo Ramírez	39.03	
3rd place, bronze medalist(s)	6	Brazil	Lucas Carvalho, Vítor Hugo dos Santos, Aldemir da Silva Júnior, Felipe dos Santos	39.54	
4	5	Chile	Enrique Polanco, Enzo Faulbaum, Rodrigo Anguita, Juan Pablo Germain	39.97	
5	2	Paraguay	Christopher Ortiz, Nilo Dure, Jesús Cáceres, Fredy Maidana	39.99	
6	7	Bolivia	Carlos Abán, Roberto Bustillo, Julian Vargas, Pablo Abán	40.46	

=== 4 × 400 meters relay ===
8 June

Rank	Nation	Competitors	Time	Notes
1st place, gold medalist(s)	Colombia	Bernardo Baloyes, Jelssin Robledo, Diego Palomeque, Yilmar Herrera	3:04.78	
2nd place, silver medalist(s)	Venezuela	José Meléndez, Alberto Aguilar, Freddy Mezones, Kelvis Padrino	3:05.75	
3rd place, bronze medalist(s)	Chile	Enzo Faulbaum, Rafael Muñoz, Sergio Aldea, Alfredo Sepúlveda	3:11.58	
4	Bolivia	Julian Vargas, Fernando Copa, Pablo Cuéllar, Luis Fernando Morales	3:17.49	

=== 20 kilometers walk ===
5 June

Rank	Name	Nationality	Time	Notes
1st place, gold medalist(s)	Brian Pintado	Ecuador	1:24:56	
2nd place, silver medalist(s)	César Rodríguez	Peru	1:26:23	
3rd place, bronze medalist(s)	Yerko Araya	Chile	1:29:37	
4	Jhon Castañeda	Colombia	1:30:29	
5	Pablo Rodríguez	Bolivia	1:34:43	
	José Leonardo Montaña	Colombia	DNS	

=== 50 kilometers walk ===
5 June

Rank	Name	Nationality	Time	Notes
1st place, gold medalist(s)	Andrés Chocho	Ecuador	3:55:48	
2nd place, silver medalist(s)	Luis Henry Campos	Peru	3:59:23	
3rd place, bronze medalist(s)	Ronald Quispe	Bolivia	4:05:05	
4	Claudio Villanueva	Ecuador	4:13:53	
5	Rodrigo Zeballos	Bolivia	4:18:53	
	Omar Sierra	Colombia	DNF	
	James Rendón	Colombia	DNF	

=== High jump ===
6 June

Rank	Name	Nationality	1.85	1.90	1.95	2.00	2.05	2.10	2.13	2.16	2.19	2.22	2.25	2.28	2.30	Result	Notes
1st place, gold medalist(s)	Eure Yáñez	Venezuela	–	–	–	–	–	o	–	xo	o	o	xo	o	xxx	2.28	GR
2nd place, silver medalist(s)	Fernando Ferreira	Brazil	–	–	–	–	–	o	o	o	xo	xo	o	xxx		2.25	
3rd place, bronze medalist(s)	Carlos Layoy	Argentina	–	–	–	o	–	o	–	o	o	o	xxo	xxx		2.25	=NR
4	Talles Silva	Brazil	–	–	–	–	–	–	xo	–	xo	xo	xxx			2.22	
5	Alexander Bowen	Panama	–	–	–	xo	–	o	–	o	o	xxx				2.19	
6	Cristóbal Hurtado	Chile	–	–	–	o	o	o	xo	xxx						2.13	
7	Arturo Chávez	Peru	–	o	–	o	xo	o	x–	x						2.10	
8	Ramón Torrico	Bolivia	o	xo	xxo	xxx										1.95	
9	Miguelangel Ortuste	Bolivia	xo	o	xxx											1.90	

=== Pole vault ===
8 June

Rank	Name	Nationality	4.60	4.80	5.00	5.20	5.30	5.40	5.50	5.55	5.60	Result	Notes
1st place, gold medalist(s)	Augusto Dutra de Oliveira	Brazil	–	–	o	o	o	o	xo	–	xxx	5.50	
2nd place, silver medalist(s)	Germán Chiaraviglio	Argentina	–	–	–	o	–	o	x–	xx		5.40	
3rd place, bronze medalist(s)	Walter Viáfara	Colombia	–	–	xxo	x–	xx					5.00	
4	Josué Gutiérrez	Peru	–	o	xxx							4.80	
5	Martín Castañares	Uruguay	o	xo	xxx							4.80	
	José Pacho	Ecuador										DNS	

=== Long jump ===
5 June

Rank	Name	Nationality	#1	#2	#3	#4	#5	#6	Result	Notes
1st place, gold medalist(s)	Emiliano Lasa	Uruguay	7.74	8.26	7.94	8.24	–	x	8.26	GR, NR
2nd place, silver medalist(s)	Paulo Sérgio Oliveira	Brazil	x	8.02	x	x	6.06	8.12	8.12	
3rd place, bronze medalist(s)	Alexsandro de Melo	Brazil	7.74	7.65	7.96	7.73	7.90	8.09	8.09	
4	Daniel Pineda	Chile	7.81	7.40	7.44	7.37	x	7.49	7.81	
5	Leodan Torrealba	Venezuela	7.76	7.39	7.43	7.42	–	x	7.76	
6	Diego Hernández	Venezuela	7.39	7.45	7.65	x	7.44	x	7.65	
7	Quincy Breell	Aruba	6.65	7.09	7.34	7.17	7.36	x	7.36	
8	Erick Suares	Bolivia	7.14	x	6.99	?	x	x	7.14	
9	José Villarroel	Bolivia	6.93	6.59	6.93				6.93	
	Jorge McFarlane	Peru	x	–	–				NM	

=== Triple jump ===
7 June

Rank	Name	Nationality	#1	#2	#3	#4	#5	#6	Result	Notes
1st place, gold medalist(s)	Miguel van Assen	Suriname	16.43	16.21	16.56	x	16.69	16.81	16.81	GR
2nd place, silver medalist(s)	Mateus de Sá	Brazil	16.43	16.60	16.18	16.48	16.76	x	16.76	
3rd place, bronze medalist(s)	Leodan Torrealba	Venezuela	15.80	16.23	16.04	15.43	16.07	x	16.23	
4	Jhon Murillo	Colombia	16.11	16.06	x	16.06	16.16	x	16.16	
5	Maximiliano Díaz	Argentina	x	x	15.29	x	15.60	15.74	15.74	
6	Bruno Garamendi	Bolivia	14.58	x	14.52	14.33	x	14.69	14.69	
7	Alfaro López	Bolivia	13.77	14.51	14.40	14.33	x	x	14.51	
	Almir dos Santos	Brazil							DNS	

=== Shot put ===
7 June

Rank	Name	Nationality	#1	#2	#3	#4	#5	#6	Result	Notes
1st place, gold medalist(s)	Darlan Romani	Brazil	20.94	21.21	20.58	x	x	21.03	21.21	GR
2nd place, silver medalist(s)	Aldo Gonzáles	Bolivia	17.73	17.68	17.91	18.33	17.93	17.89	18.33	
3rd place, bronze medalist(s)	Levin Moreno	Colombia	17.05	17.60	x	17.39	x	16.74	17.60	
4	José Miguel Ballivián	Chile	17.28	x	16.87	x	x	16.70	17.28	

=== Discus throw ===
8 June

Rank	Name	Nationality	#1	#2	#3	#4	#5	#6	Result	Notes
1st place, gold medalist(s)	Mauricio Ortega	Colombia	59.66	62.10	60.13	x	59.70	58.09	62.10	GR
2nd place, silver medalist(s)	Juan José Caicedo	Ecuador	55.80	55.31	x	56.94	57.01	57.37	57.37	
3rd place, bronze medalist(s)	José Miguel Ballivian	Chile	x	49.25	50.02	x	51.09	52.91	52.91	
4	Douglas dos Reis	Brazil	x	x	x	x	51.76	x	51.76	
5	Jorge Olmos	Bolivia	45.68	44.94	x	44.97	45.75	43.66	45.75	

=== Hammer throw ===
5 June

Rank	Name	Nationality	#1	#2	#3	#4	#5	#6	Result	Notes
1st place, gold medalist(s)	Joaquín Gómez	Argentina	68.14	73.62	75.10	74.27	73.86	x	75.10	GR, AU23R
2nd place, silver medalist(s)	Humberto Mansilla	Chile	x	70.33	74.71	69.48	70.21	71.55	74.71	NR
3rd place, bronze medalist(s)	Wagner Domingos	Brazil	x	x	x	72.53	71.42	x	72.53	
4	Gabriel Kehr	Chile	65.93	68.69	70.98	71.54	72.06	69.97	72.06	
5	Allan Wolski	Brazil	x	71.51	x	x	x	x	71.51	
6	Manuel Terán	Bolivia	47.11	51.16	52.42	x	50.39	49.21	52.42	

=== Javelin throw ===
6 June

Rank	Name	Nationality	#1	#2	#3	#4	#5	#6	Result	Notes
1st place, gold medalist(s)	Arley Ibargüen	Colombia	x	70.85	80.11	74.29	78.91	x	80.11	GR
2nd place, silver medalist(s)	Leslain Baird	Guyana	59.63	72.86	69.08	73.28	78.65	–	78.65	
3rd place, bronze medalist(s)	Braian Toledo	Argentina	75.62	x	76.33	75.36	77.81	78.57	78.57	
4	Francisco Muse	Chile	68.05	72.42	68.12	x	72.73	69.10	72.73	
5	Giovanni Díaz	Paraguay	x	x	65.42	x	67.39	x	67.39	
6	José Escobar	Ecuador	63.53	66.75	65.39	64.28	63.63	62.62	66.75	
7	Víctor Fatecha	Paraguay	x	65.37	x	x	x	–	65.37	
8	Melbin Soto	Bolivia	64.34	x	61.58	64.78	62.80	61.46	64.78	
9	Ghaddy Hocuvere	Bolivia	51.53	51.42	x				51.53	

=== Decathlon ===
5–6 June

The highest mark recorded in each event is highlighted in yellow

Rank	Athlete	Nationality	100m	LJ	SP	HJ	400m	110m H	DT	PV	JT	1500m	Points	Notes
1st place, gold medalist(s)	Georni Jaramillo	Venezuela	10.66	7.71	14.75	1.89	47.92	13.95	44.45	4.50	57.57	5:17.65	7977	GR, NR
2nd place, silver medalist(s)	José Lemos	Colombia	11.21	6.84	16.21	1.95	50.63	14.51	50.79	4.00	68.33	5:14.21	7757	
3rd place, bronze medalist(s)	Felipe dos Santos	Brazil	10.51	7.30	12.47	2.04	48.89	13.88	41.94	4.70	50.24	5:23.13	7739	
4	Gerson Izaguirre	Venezuela	11.14	7.30	13.33	1.95	50.44	14.37	39.29	4.20	53.59	5:22.03	7287	
5	Sergio Pandiani	Argentina	11.00	7.21	13.42	1.95	49.52	14.77	39.77	3.60	55.97	5:06.52	7260	
6	Andy Preciado	Ecuador	11.15	6.84	14.61	2.13	51.94	14.49	50.29	NM	54.62	5:44.58	6796	

== Women's results ==
=== 100 meters ===
Heats – 6 June
Wind:
Heat 1: -1.5 m/s, Heat 2: -1.2 m/s

Rank	Heat	Name	Nationality	Time	Notes
1	1	Ángela Tenorio	Ecuador	11.01	Q
2	2	Narcisa Landazuri	Ecuador	11.12	Q
3	1	Vitória Cristina Rosa	Brazil	11.18	Q
4	2	Isidora Jiménez	Chile	11.19	Q
5	1	Andrea Purica	Venezuela	11.26	Q
6	2	Rosângela Santos	Brazil	11.39	Q
7	1	María Victoria Woodward	Argentina	11.48	q
8	2	Nercely Soto	Venezuela	11.69	q
9	1	Paola Mautino	Peru	11.76	NR
10	2	Alinny Delgadillo	Bolivia	11.84	
11	1	Carolina Ocampo	Bolivia	11.90	

Final – 6 June
Wind:
-0.7 m/s

Rank	Lane	Name	Nationality	Time	Notes
1st place, gold medalist(s)	5	Narcisa Landazuri	Ecuador	11.12	
2nd place, silver medalist(s)	4	Ángela Tenorio	Ecuador	11.13	
3rd place, bronze medalist(s)	3	Vitória Cristina Rosa	Brazil	11.23	
4	7	Andrea Purica	Venezuela	11.26	
5	6	Isidora Jiménez	Chile	11.33	
6	8	Rosângela Santos	Brazil	11.39	
7	2	María Victoria Woodward	Argentina	11.77	
	1	Nercely Soto	Venezuela	DNF	

=== 200 meters ===
7 June
Wind: +1.0 m/s

Rank	Lane	Name	Nationality	Time	Notes
1st place, gold medalist(s)	3	Vitória Cristina Rosa	Brazil	22.87	GR
2nd place, silver medalist(s)	4	Ángela Tenorio	Ecuador	23.07	
3rd place, bronze medalist(s)	5	Nercely Soto	Venezuela	23.11	
4	8	Isidora Jiménez	Chile	23.13	
5	8	Narcisa Landazuri	Ecuador	23.65	
6	7	Sunayna Wahi	Suriname	24.15	
7	1	Alinny Delgadillo	Bolivia	24.92	
8	2	Nilsa Arce	Bolivia	25.82	

=== 400 meters ===
Heats – 5 June

Rank	Heat	Name	Nationality	Time	Notes
1	1	Geisa Coutinho	Brazil	52.90	Q
2	1	Eliana Chávez	Colombia	53.92	Q
2	2	Jennifer Padilla	Colombia	53.92	Q
4	2	María Fernanda Mackenna	Chile	54.36	Q
5	1	María José Echeverría	Chile	54.51	Q
6	2	Noelia Martínez	Argentina	54.57	Q
7	1	María Ayelén Diogo	Argentina	54.76	q
8	2	Maitte Torres	Peru	55.99	q
9	1	Lucia Sotomayor	Bolivia	57.75	

Final – 6 June

Rank	Lane	Name	Nationality	Time	Notes
1st place, gold medalist(s)	5	Jennifer Padilla	Colombia	52.14	
2nd place, silver medalist(s)	4	Geisa Coutinho	Brazil	52.93	
3rd place, bronze medalist(s)	6	María Fernanda Mackenna	Chile	53.60	
4	3	Eliana Chávez	Colombia	53.74	
5	8	María José Echeverría	Chile	54.52	
6	1	María Ayelén Diogo	Argentina	55.07	
7	2	Maitte Torres	Peru	55.53	
8	7	Noelia Martínez	Argentina	55.64	

=== 800 meters ===
8 June

Rank	Name	Nationality	Time	Notes
1st place, gold medalist(s)	Déborah Rodríguez	Uruguay	2:16.21	
2nd place, silver medalist(s)	Rosangélica Escobar	Colombia	2:16.89	
3rd place, bronze medalist(s)	María Pía Fernández	Uruguay	2:17.16	
4	Johana Arrieta	Colombia	2:17.51	
5	Andrea Calderón	Ecuador	2:17.83	
6	Mariana Borelli	Argentina	2:17.89	
7	Luz Paco	Bolivia	2:21.91	
8	Andrea Balderas	Bolivia	2:29.07	
	Javiera Faletto	Chile	DNS	

=== 1500 meters ===
6 June

Rank	Name	Nationality	Time	Notes
1st place, gold medalist(s)	Muriel Coneo	Colombia	4:27.10	
2nd place, silver medalist(s)	María Pía Fernández	Uruguay	4:30.56	
3rd place, bronze medalist(s)	Micaela Levaggi	Argentina	4:30.88	
4	Soledad Torre	Peru	4:36.80	
5	Rosibel García	Colombia	4:40.25	
6	Edith Mamani	Bolivia	4:46.48	
7	María Luz Tesuri	Argentina	4:49.19	
8	Helen Baltazar	Bolivia	4:50.89	
	Andrea Ferris	Panama	DNF	
	Javiera Faletto	Chile	DNF	

=== 5000 meters ===
7 June

Rank	Name	Nationality	Time	Notes
1st place, gold medalist(s)	Saida Meneses	Peru	16:47.37	
2nd place, silver medalist(s)	Luz Mery Rojas	Peru	17:09.59	
3rd place, bronze medalist(s)	Carmen Toaquiza	Ecuador	17:16.40	
4	Florencia Borelli	Argentina	18:01.76	
5	Salome Mendoza	Bolivia	18:06.42	
6	Celfy Achaya	Bolivia	18:28.38	
	Muriel Coneo	Colombia	DNF	
	Tatiele de Carvalho	Brazil	DNF	
	María Luz Tesuri	Argentina	DNF	

=== 10,000 meters ===
5 June

Rank	Name	Nationality	Time	Notes
1st place, gold medalist(s)	Inés Melchor	Peru	35:57.86	
2nd place, silver medalist(s)	Gladys Tejeda	Peru	35:59.45	
3rd place, bronze medalist(s)	Irma Vila	Bolivia	36:12.74	
4	Carmen Toaquiza	Ecuador	37:07.35	
5	Tatiele de Carvalho	Brazil	37:31.36	
6	Carmen Martínez	Paraguay	39:33.45	
	Salome Mendoza	Bolivia	DNF	

=== 100 meters hurdles ===
Heats – 6 June
Wind:
Heat 1: -0.4 m/s, Heat 2: -0.5 m/s

Rank	Heat	Name	Nationality	Time	Notes
1	2	Génesis Romero	Venezuela	13.14	Q
2	1	Maribel Caicedo	Ecuador	13.34	Q
3	1	Jenea McCammon	Guyana	13.43	Q
4	2	Diana Bazalar	Peru	13.47	Q
5	2	Brigitte Merlano	Colombia	13.53	Q
6	1	Fabiana Moraes	Brazil	13.56	Q
7	2	María Ignacia Eguiguren	Chile	14.03	q
8	1	Mariza Karabia	Paraguay	14.24	q
9	1	Flavia Drpic	Bolivia	15.28	

Final – 6 June
Wind:
+0.2 m/s

Rank	Lane	Name	Nationality	Time	Notes
1st place, gold medalist(s)	4	Génesis Romero	Venezuela	13.08	GR, NR
2nd place, silver medalist(s)	6	Diana Bazalar	Peru	13.36	NR
3rd place, bronze medalist(s)	3	Jenea McCammon	Guyana	13.39	NR
4	7	Fabiana Moraes	Brazil	13.40	
5	8	Brigitte Merlano	Colombia	13.57	
	5	Maribel Caicedo	Ecuador	DNF	
	1	María Ignacia Eguiguren	Chile	DNS	
	2	Mariza Karabia	Paraguay	DNS	

=== 400 meters hurdles ===
7 June

Rank	Lane	Name	Nationality	Time	Notes
1st place, gold medalist(s)	4	Fiorella Chiappe	Argentina	56.39	
2nd place, silver medalist(s)	5	Melissa Gonzalez	Colombia	56.86	
3rd place, bronze medalist(s)	3	Gianna Woodruff	Panama	57.68	
4	6	Valeria Baron	Argentina	1:01.23	
5	2	Marina Poroso	Ecuador	1:01.31	
	7	Kimberly Cardoza	Peru	DNF	

=== 3000 meters steeplechase ===
8 June

Rank	Name	Nationality	Time	Notes
1st place, gold medalist(s)	Rina Cjuro	Peru	10:53.83	
2nd place, silver medalist(s)	Edith Mamani	Bolivia	10:59.06	
3rd place, bronze medalist(s)	Jhoselyn Camargo	Bolivia	11:18.63	
4	Carolina Lozano	Argentina	11:46.18	
5	María Caballero	Paraguay	13:10.08	
	Andrea Ferris	Panama	DNF	

=== 4 × 100 meters relay ===
7 June

Rank	Lane	Nation	Competitors	Time	Notes
1st place, gold medalist(s)	5	Venezuela	Luisarys Toledo, Andrea Purica, Génesis Romero, Nercely Soto	44.71	
2nd place, silver medalist(s)	3	Bolivia	Danitza Avila, Alinny Delgadillo, Guadalupe Torrez, Carolina Ocampo	46.17	
3rd place, bronze medalist(s)	6	Peru	Paola Mautino, Maitte Torres, Diana Bazalar, Kimberly Cardoza	46.43	
	4	Ecuador		DNS	

=== 4 × 400 meters relay ===
8 June

Rank	Nation	Competitors	Time	Notes
1st place, gold medalist(s)	Colombia	Eliana Chávez, Rosangélica Escobar, Melissa Gonzalez, Jennifer Padilla	3:31.87	GR
2nd place, silver medalist(s)	Chile	Martina Weil, Isidora Jiménez, María José Echeverría, María Fernanda Mackenna	3:33.42	
3rd place, bronze medalist(s)	Argentina	María Ayelén Diogo, Valeria Baron, Noelia Martínez, Fiorella Chiappe	3:35.96	NR
4	Bolivia	Lucia Sotomayor, Alinny Delgadillo, Fernanda Balanza, Nilsa Arce	3:55.76	

=== 20 kilometers walk ===
5 June

Rank	Name	Nationality	Time	Notes
1st place, gold medalist(s)	Kimberly García	Peru	1:33:11	GR
2nd place, silver medalist(s)	Ángela Castro	Bolivia	1:34:25	
3rd place, bronze medalist(s)	Maritza Guamán	Ecuador	1:36:23	
4	Paola Pérez	Ecuador	1:38:08	
5	Arabelly Orjuela	Colombia	1:39:29	
6	Odeth Huanca	Bolivia	1:48:35	
	Sandra Galvis	Colombia	DNF	

=== High jump ===
5 June

Rank	Name	Nationality	1.55	1.60	1.65	1.70	1.75	1.80	1.83	1.86	1.90	1.95	Result	Notes
1st place, gold medalist(s)	María Fernanda Murillo	Colombia	–	–	–	o	–	o	o	o	xxo	xxx	1.90	GR, AU20R, =PB
2nd place, silver medalist(s)	Valdileia Martins	Brazil	–	–	–	–	o	o	xo	xxx			1.83	
3rd place, bronze medalist(s)	Amanda Vergara	Venezuela	–	–	–	–	xo	o	xxx				1.80	
4	Joice Micolta	Ecuador	–	–	xo	xo	xo	xo	xxx				1.80	
5	Jennifer Rodríguez	Colombia	–	–	–	o	xo	xxo	xxx				1.80	
6	Lorena Aires	Uruguay	–	–	–	xo	xo	xxx					1.75	
7	Carla Ríos	Bolivia	o	o	o	xxx							1.65	

=== Pole vault ===
7 June

Rank	Name	Nationality	3.50	3.70	3.90	4.00	4.20	4.30	4.40	4.50	4.60	4.70	4.76	Result	Notes
1st place, gold medalist(s)	Robeilys Peinado	Venezuela	–	–	–	o	–	o	–	o	o	o	xxx	4.70	GR, NR
2nd place, silver medalist(s)	Juliana Campos	Brazil	–	–	x–	o	o	x–	xx					4.20	
3rd place, bronze medalist(s)	Carmen Villanueva	Venezuela	–	o	xo	xxx								3.90	
4	Valeria Chiaraviglio	Argentina	–	xxo	xxx									3.70	
5	Catalina Amarilla	Paraguay	xo	xxx										3.50	

=== Long jump ===
6 June

Rank	Name	Nationality	#1	#2	#3	#4	#5	#6	Result	Notes
1st place, gold medalist(s)	Paola Mautino	Peru	6.13	x	6.48	6.48	6.66	x	6.66	=GR, NR
2nd place, silver medalist(s)	Eliane Martins	Brazil	6.66	x	x	x	x	6.44	6.66	GR
3rd place, bronze medalist(s)	Nathalee Aranda	Panama	6.47	6.60	x	x	x	6.48	6.60	NR
4	Jéssica dos Reis	Brazil	6.32	6.08	6.35	6.17	x	6.56	6.56	
5	Macarena Reyes	Chile	x	6.45	6.53	6.50	x	6.45	6.53	
6	Valeria Quispe	Bolivia	x	5.99	?	x	x	5.89	5.99	
7	Silvana Segura	Peru	x	5.87	x	x	x	x	5.87	
8	Adriana Cortez	Bolivia	5.54	x	x	5.38	5.45	x	5.54	
9	Aries Sánchez	Venezuela	3.13	–	–				3.13	

=== Triple jump ===
7 June

Rank	Name	Nationality	#1	#2	#3	#4	#5	#6	Result	Notes
1st place, gold medalist(s)	Núbia Soares	Brazil	x	14.38	14.59	x	x	–	14.59	GR, NR
2nd place, silver medalist(s)	Silvana Segura	Peru	x	13.56	x	13.36	x	13.35	13.56	
3rd place, bronze medalist(s)	Giselly Landázury	Colombia	13.30	x	13.40	13.16	13.46	13.13	13.46	
4	Valeria Quispe	Bolivia	x	x	13.37	13.21	x	x	13.37	

=== Shot put ===
7 June

Rank	Name	Nationality	#1	#2	#3	#4	#5	#6	Result	Notes
1st place, gold medalist(s)	Natalia Duco	Chile	17.92	17.87	x	17.72	18.15	17.97	18.15	GR
2nd place, silver medalist(s)	Ahymara Espinoza	Venezuela	17.11	17.63	x	17.71	17.72	18.09	18.09	
3rd place, bronze medalist(s)	Geisa Arcanjo	Brazil	17.15	16.91	x	x	17.30	17.25	17.30	
4	Anyela Rivas	Colombia	15.90	16.64	16.17	16.53	16.80	16.69	16.80	
5	Ivana Gallardo	Chile	x	14.95	16.14	15.74	15.82	16.45	16.45	

=== Discus throw ===
7 June

Rank	Name	Nationality	#1	#2	#3	#4	#5	#6	Result	Notes
1st place, gold medalist(s)	Andressa de Morais	Brazil	55.39	x	55.43	57.40	58.86	56.23	58.86	
2nd place, silver medalist(s)	Fernanda Martins	Brazil	x	57.29	x	56.20	x	55.64	57.29	
3rd place, bronze medalist(s)	Ailén Armada	Argentina	46.40	48.77	x	x	47.87	46.81	48.77	
4	Ivana Gallardo	Chile	x	x	47.47	x	x	x	47.47	
5	Ana Laura Méndez	Bolivia	x	35.58	36.65	34.76	x	35.36	36.65	
6	Nicohol Caballero	Bolivia	32.36	34.35	x	32.31	31.85	x	34.35	

=== Hammer throw ===
5 June

Rank	Name	Nationality	#1	#2	#3	#4	#5	#6	Result	Notes
1st place, gold medalist(s)	Jennifer Dahlgren	Argentina	62.95	x	66.75	x	69.14	70.98	70.98	GR
2nd place, silver medalist(s)	Rosa Rodríguez	Venezuela	66.75	x	x	67.61	x	70.93	70.93	
3rd place, bronze medalist(s)	Valeria Chiliquinga	Ecuador	x	58.31	61.99	64.42	66.77	x	66.77	
4	Mariana Marcelino	Brazil	64.60	65.16	65.12	65.92	60.49	66.01	66.01	
5	Johana Moreno	Colombia	62.11	63.16	64.64	x	63.86	x	64.64	
6	Mariana García	Chile	57.81	57.80	56.67	x	54.76	x	57.81	

=== Javelin throw ===
6 June

Rank	Name	Nationality	#1	#2	#3	#4	#5	#6	Result	Notes
1st place, gold medalist(s)	Laila Ferrer e Silva	Brazil	56.36	57.02	55.99	x	60.25	54.86	60.25	
2nd place, silver medalist(s)	María Lucelly Murillo	Colombia	56.58	57.10	51.54	x	x	58.81	58.81	
3rd place, bronze medalist(s)	Eloah Scramin	Brazil	51.77	52.41	57.32	55.07	53.97	57.42	57.42	
4	María Paz Ríos	Chile	52.31	53.32	50.07	48.51	48.79	50.10	53.32	
5	Juleisy Angulo	Ecuador	x	38.82	49.33	36.64	x	x	49.33	
6	Berenice Flores	Bolivia	37.85	28.86	36.56	x	28.12	x	37.85	
7	Valery Moreno	Bolivia	33.47	33.53	34.75	x	x	31.20	34.75	

=== Heptathlon ===
7–8 June

The highest mark recorded in each event is highlighted in yellow

Rank	Athlete	Nationality	100m H	HJ	SP	200m	LJ	JT	800m	Points	Notes
1st place, gold medalist(s)	Giovana Cavaleti	Brazil	13.80	1.80	13.00	24.09	6.10	40.12	2:18.26	6081	GR
2nd place, silver medalist(s)	Martha Araújo	Colombia	13.90	1.68	12.15	25.41	5.68	51.82	2:27.27	5719	
3rd place, bronze medalist(s)	Ana Camila Pirelli	Paraguay	13.94	1.65	12.24	25.42	5.45	41.06	2:20.21	5503	
4	Luisairys Toledo	Venezuela	14.56	1.62	11.80	24.83	5.84	41.34	2:31.16	5382	
5	Joyce Micolta	Ecuador	15.18	1.80	11.07	26.89	5.52	38.46	2:38.35	5053	
