= Núbia Soares =

Brazilian triple jumper

Personal information
- Born: 26 March 1996 (age 30) Lagoa da Prata, Brazil
- Height: 1.76 m (5 ft 9 in)
- Weight: 52 kg (115 lb)

Sport
- Sport: Track and field
- Event: Triple jump
- Club: Clube Atletismo BM&F Bovespa
- Coached by: Neilton Moura

Núbia Aparecida Soares (born 26 March 1996) is a Brazilian athlete whose specialty is the triple jump. She competed at the 2015 World Championships in Beijing without qualifying for the final. She competed at the 2020 Summer Olympics.

Her personal bests in the event are 14.69 metres outdoors (Sotteville-lès-Rouen 2018) and 14.00 metres indoors (Birmingham 2018).

Before turning to athletics, she was a handball player.

== Competition record ==
Year	Competition	Venue	Position	Event	Notes
Representing Brazil
2013	World Youth Championships	Donetsk, Ukraine	4th	Triple jump	13.60 m
2013	Pan American Junior Championships	Medellin, Colombia	3rd	Triple jump	13.33 m
2014	World Junior Championships	Eugene, United States	8th	Triple jump	13.53 m (w)
2014	South American U23 Championships	Montevideo, Uruguay	2nd	Triple jump	13.31 m
2015	Pan American Games	Toronto, Canada	11th	Triple jump	13.57 m (w)
2015	Pan American Junior Championships	Edmonton, Canada	1st	Triple jump	14.16 m (w)
2015	World Championships	Beijing, China	22nd (q)	Triple jump	13.52 m
2016	Ibero-American Championships	Rio de Janeiro, Brazil	2nd	Triple jump	14.00 m
2016	Olympic Games	Rio de Janeiro, Brazil	34rd (q)	Triple jump	13.85 m
2017	South American Championships	Asunción, Paraguay	1st	Triple jump	14.42 m (w)
2018	World Indoor Championships	Birmingham, United Kingdom	9th	Triple jump	14.00 m
2018	South American Games	Cochabamba, Bolivia	1st	Triple jump	14.59 m
2021	Olympic Games	Tokyo, Japan	17th (q)	Triple jump	14.07 m
2022	Ibero-American Championships	La Nucía, Spain	–	Triple jump	NM
2022	South American Games	Asunción, Paraguay	3rd	Triple jump	13.10 m
2023	Pan American Games	Santiago, Chile	6th	Triple jump	12.78 m
