= Alfredo Sepúlveda =

Chilean athletics competitor

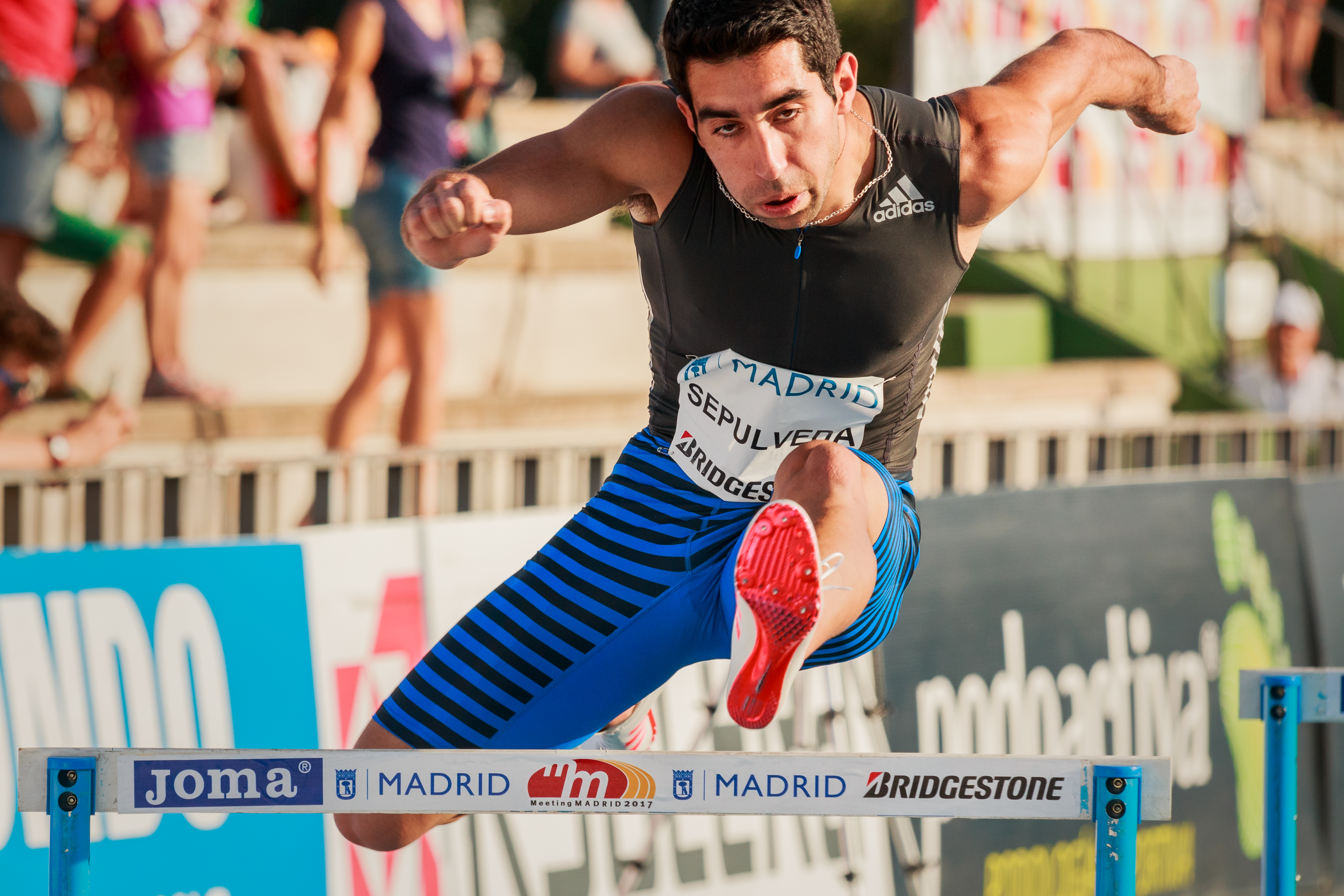
- IAAF World Challenge - 2017

Personal information
- Full name: Alfredo Emilio Sepúlveda Sandoval
- Born: 3 August 1993 (age 32) Valparaíso, Chile
- Education: University of Chile
- Height: 1.79 m (5 ft 10 in)
- Weight: 75 kg (165 lb)

Sport
- Sport: Athletics
- Event: 400 m hurdles
Medal record
South American Games
Silver medal – second place	2018 Cochabamba	400m hurdles
Bronze medal – third place	2018 Cochabamba	4 × 400m relay

Alfredo Emilio Sepúlveda Sandoval (born 3 August 1993) is a Chilean athlete specialising in the 400 metres hurdles. He won a silver medal at the 2018 South American Games in a new national record of 49.62.

== International competitions ==
Year	Competition	Venue	Position	Event	Notes
Representing Chile
2010	South American Youth Championships	Santiago, Chile	1st	400 m hurdles (84 cm)	53.6
2012	World Junior Championships	Barcelona, Spain	43rd (h)	400 m hurdles	53.43
2014	South American Games	Santiago, Chile	6th	400 m hurdles	52.68
2014	South American Games	Santiago, Chile	4th	4 × 400 m relay	3:16.98
2014	South American U23 Championships	Montevideo, Uruguay	3rd	400 m hurdles	51.56
2014	South American U23 Championships	Montevideo, Uruguay	2nd	4 × 400 m relay	3:11.93
2015	Pan American Games	Toronto, Canada	16th (h)	400 m hurdles	52.32
2015	Pan American Games	Toronto, Canada	10th (h)	4 × 400 m relay	3:09.89
2015	Universiade	Gwangju, South Korea	14th (sf)	400 m hurdles	51.32
2016	Ibero-American Championships	Rio de Janeiro, Brazil	6th	400 m hurdles	49.86
2016	Ibero-American Championships	Rio de Janeiro, Brazil	4th	4 × 400 m relay	3:07.56
2017	South American Championships	Asunción, Paraguay	3rd	400 m hurdles	50.37
2017	South American Championships	Asunción, Paraguay	4th	4 × 400 m relay	3:13.64
2017	Universiade	Taipei, Taiwan	21st (sf)	400 m hurdles	52.26
2018	South American Games	Cochabamba, Bolivia	2nd	400 m hurdles	49.62
2018	South American Games	Cochabamba, Bolivia	3rd	4 × 400 m relay	3:11.58
2018	Ibero-American Championships	Trujillo, Peru	8th	400 m hurdles	51.51
2018	Ibero-American Championships	Trujillo, Peru	1st	4 × 400 m relay	3:10.77
2019	South American Championships	Lima, Peru	2nd	400 m hurdles	50.03
2019	South American Championships	Lima, Peru	3rd	4 × 400 m relay	3:11.84
2021	South American Championships	Guayaquil, Ecuador	4th	400 m hurdles	51.69
2022	Ibero-American Championships	La Nucía, Spain	4th	400 m hurdles	50.35
2022	Bolivarian Games	Valledupar, Colombia	2nd	400 m hurdles	50.25
2022	Bolivarian Games	Valledupar, Colombia	5th	4 × 400 m relay	3:11.92
2022	South American Games	Asunción, Paraguay	5th	400 m hurdles	51.69
2022	South American Games	Asunción, Paraguay	4th	4 × 400 m relay	3:10.00
2023	Pan American Games	Santiago, Chile	12th (h)	400 m hurdles	52.34
2024	Ibero-American Championships	Cuiabá, Brazil	8th	400 m hurdles	53.03
2024	Ibero-American Championships	Cuiabá, Brazil	–	4 × 400 m relay	DQ

== Personal best ==
Outdoor

- 200 metres – 21.92 (-1.9 ms/, Cochabamba 2018)
- 400 metres – 46.44 (São Paulo, 2018)
- 800 metres – 1:53.53 (Montevideo 2016)
- 400 metres hurdles – 49.62 (Cochabamba 2018)
