= Athletics at the 2022 South American Games – Results =

These are the full results of the athletics competition at the 2022 South American Games which took place between 12 and 15 October 2022, in Asunción, Paraguay.

== Men's results ==
=== 100 meters ===
Heats – October 13
Wind:
Heat 1: -1.2 m/s, Heat 2: +0.4 m/s

Rank	Heat	Name	Nationality	Time	Notes
1	2	Carlos Palacios	Colombia	10.29	Q
2	2	Franco Florio	Argentina	10.32	Q
3	1	Felipe Bardi	Brazil	10.34	Q
4	2	Rodrigo do Nascimento	Brazil	10.36	Q
5	2	David Vivas	Venezuela	10.46	q
6	1	Abdel Kalil	Venezuela	10.53	Q
7	2	Jonathan Wolk	Paraguay	10.55	q
8	1	Misael Zalazar	Paraguay	10.57	Q
9	2	Luis Humberto Angulo	Peru	10.61	
10	1	Aron Earl	Peru	10.68	
11	2	Lisse Jalen	Suriname	10.83	
12	1	Arturo Deliser	Panama	10.90	
13	1	Tito Hinojosa	Bolivia	11.03	
	1	Ronal Longa	Colombia	DNS	

Final – October 13

Wind: -1.3 m/s

Rank	Lane	Name	Nationality	Time	Notes
1st place, gold medalist(s)	5	Franco Florio	Argentina	10.35	
2nd place, silver medalist(s)	3	Felipe Bardi	Brazil	10.37	
3rd place, bronze medalist(s)	6	Carlos Palacios	Colombia	10.46	
4	8	Rodrigo do Nascimento	Brazil	10.53	
5	4	Abdel Kalil	Venezuela	10.70	
6	1	David Vivas	Venezuela	10.71	10.707
7	7	Misael Zalazar	Paraguay	10.71	10.708
8	2	Jonathan Wolk	Paraguay	10.77	

=== 200 meters ===
Heats – October 14
Wind:
Heat 1: +1.1 m/s, Heat 2: +1.4 m/s

Rank	Heat	Name	Nationality	Time	Notes
1	2	Lucas Vilar	Brazil	20.81	Q
2	1	Lucas da Silva	Brazil	20.86	Q
3	2	Anderson Marquinez	Ecuador	20.91	Q
4	2	Misael Zalazar	Paraguay	20.96	Q
5	1	Rafael Vásquez	Venezuela	21.01	Q
6	2	Enzo Faulbaum	Chile	21.21	q
7	2	Arturo Deliser	Panama	21.27	q
8	1	César Almirón	Paraguay	21.29	Q
9	1	Steeven Salas	Ecuador	21.41	
10	2	Abdel Kalil	Venezuela	21.50	
11	1	Tito Hinojosa	Bolivia	21.99	
12	1	Carlos Palacios	Colombia	23.74	
	1	Franco Florio	Argentina	DNS	
	2	Elián Larregina	Argentina	DNS	
	2	Ronal Longa	Colombia	DNS	

Final – October 14

Wind: -0.5 m/s

Rank	Lane	Name	Nationality	Time	Notes
1st place, gold medalist(s)	6	Lucas da Silva	Brazil	20.89	
2nd place, silver medalist(s)	3	Anderson Marquinez	Ecuador	20.95	
3rd place, bronze medalist(s)	4	Rafael Vásquez	Venezuela	21.15	
4	1	Enzo Faulbaum	Chile	21.24	
5	8	César Almirón	Paraguay	21.50	
6	2	Arturo Deliser	Panama	21.51	
7	7	Misael Zalazar	Paraguay	22.02	
	5	Lucas Vilar	Brazil	DNS	

=== 400 meters ===
Heats – October 12

Rank	Heat	Name	Nationality	Time	Notes
1	2	Lucas Carvalho	Brazil	46.36	Q
2	2	Elián Larregina	Argentina	47.66	Q
3	1	Kelvis Padrino	Venezuela	46.95	Q
4	1	Vitor de Miranda	Brazil	47.22	Q
5	1	Javier Gómez	Venezuela	47.36	Q
6	1	Francisco Tejeda	Ecuador	47.42	q
7	2	Alan Minda	Ecuador	48.00	Q
8	2	Nicolás Salinas	Colombia	48.03	q
9	2	Nilo Duré	Paraguay	48.64	
10	2	Jhumiler Sánchez	Paraguay	49.31	
11	1	Gustavo Barrios	Colombia	49.93	

Final – October 13

Rank	Lane	Name	Nationality	Time	Notes
1st place, gold medalist(s)	3	Elián Larregina	Argentina	45.80	
2nd place, silver medalist(s)	5	Kelvis Padrino	Venezuela	46.41	
3rd place, bronze medalist(s)	4	Lucas Carvalho	Brazil	46.47	
4	6	Vitor de Miranda	Brazil	46.95	
5	7	Javier Gómez	Venezuela	47.06	
6	2	Francisco Tejeda	Ecuador	47.48	
7	1	Nicolás Salinas	Colombia	48.04	
7	8	Alan Minda	Ecuador	48.04	

=== 800 meters ===
October 15

Rank	Name	Nationality	Time	Notes
1st place, gold medalist(s)	Chamar Chambers	Panama	1:46.99	
2nd place, silver medalist(s)	José Antonio Maita	Venezuela	1:47.26	
3rd place, bronze medalist(s)	Eduardo Moreira	Brazil	1:47.39	
4	Guilherme Kurtz	Brazil	1:48.21	
5	Ryan López	Venezuela	1:49.37	
6	Jelssin Robledo	Colombia	1:49.40	
7	Diego Lacamoire	Argentina	1:52.44	
8	Esteban González	Chile	1:53.39	
9	Alexis López	Paraguay	1:59.25	
10	José Cabrera	Paraguay	1:59.95	
	Marco Vilca	Peru	DNS	
	Diego Uribe	Chile	DNS	

=== 1500 meters ===
October 13

Rank	Name	Nationality	Time	Notes
~~1~~	Federico Bruno	Argentina	~~3:40.90~~	DQ, doping
1st place, gold medalist(s)	Guilherme Kurtz	Brazil	3:41.58	
2nd place, silver medalist(s)	Santiago Catrofe	Uruguay	3:42.57	
3rd place, bronze medalist(s)	José Zabala	Argentina	3:44.42	
4	Sebastián López	Venezuela	3:45.81	
5	Diego Uribe	Chile	3:47.30	
6	David Ninavia	Bolivia	3:49.41	
7	Esteban González	Chile	3:50.71	
8	Eduardo Gregorio	Uruguay	3:51.32	
9	Ericky Dos Santos	Paraguay	3:51.63	
10	Carlos San Martín	Colombia	3:54.63	
	Eduardo Moreira	Brazil	DNS	

=== 5000 meters ===
October 12

Rank	Name	Nationality	Time	Notes
~~1~~	Federico Bruno	Argentina	~~13:54.79~~	DQ, doping
1st place, gold medalist(s)	Santiago Catrofe	Uruguay	13:55.24	
2nd place, silver medalist(s)	Ignacio Velásquez	Chile	14:01.12	
3rd place, bronze medalist(s)	David Ninavia	Bolivia	14:08.37	
4	Vidal Basco	Bolivia	14:11.78	
5	Yuri Labra	Peru	14:23.74	
6	Frank Lujan	Peru	14:41.03	
7	Hector Silguero	Paraguay	15:08.75	
	Ignacio Erario	Argentina	DNF	

=== 10,000 meters ===
October 14

Rank	Name	Nationality	Time	Notes
1st place, gold medalist(s)	Carlos Díaz	Chile	29:15.66	
2nd place, silver medalist(s)	Ignacio Velásquez	Chile	29:30.81	
3rd place, bronze medalist(s)	Héctor Garibay	Bolivia	29:35.87	
4	Rafael Loza	Ecuador	30:45.42	
5	Janiek Pomba	Suriname	35:15.66	
	Vidal Basco	Bolivia	DNF	
	Gerard Giraldo	Colombia	DNF	
	Frank Lujan	Peru	DNF	
	Joaquín Arbe	Argentina	DNF	
	Ignacio Erario	Argentina	DNF	

=== Marathon ===
October 15

Rank	Name	Nationality	Time	Notes
1st place, gold medalist(s)	Christian Vascónez	Ecuador	2:16:34	GR
2nd place, silver medalist(s)	Derlys Ayala	Paraguay	2:17:13	
3rd place, bronze medalist(s)	Ernesto Zamora	Uruguay	2:17:43	
4	Nicolás Cuestas	Uruguay	2:20:10	
5	Pedro Gómez	Argentina	2:30:33	
	René Champi	Peru	DNF	
	Luis Fernando Ostos	Peru	DNF	
	Carlos Gonzales	Paraguay	DNF	

=== 110 meters hurdles ===
October 13
Wind: -0.1 m/s

Rank	Lane	Name	Nationality	Time	Notes
1st place, gold medalist(s)	6	Eduardo de Deus	Brazil	13.70	
2nd place, silver medalist(s)	5	Fanor Escobar	Colombia	13.96	
3rd place, bronze medalist(s)	4	Gabriel Constantino	Brazil	14.00	
4	3	Brayan Rojas	Colombia	14.10	
5	2	Martín Sáenz	Chile	14.23	
6	7	José Carlos Cáceres	Paraguay	16.82	
	8	Kevin Mendieta	Paraguay	DNS	

=== 400 meters hurdles ===
Heats – October 13

Rank	Heat	Name	Nationality	Time	Notes
1	2	Bruno De Genaro	Argentina	52.32	Q
2	1	Fanor Escobar	Colombia	52.37	Q
3	2	Hederson Estefani	Brazil	52.59	Q
4	1	Julio Rodríguez	Venezuela	52.71	Q
5	1	Diego Courbis	Chile	52.94	Q
6	1	Marcio Teles	Brazil	52.97	q
7	2	Kevin Mina	Colombia	54.30	Q
8	2	Alfredo Sepúlveda	Chile	54.74	q
9	1	Antonio Méndez	Paraguay	55.83	
10	2	Mathias Paredes	Paraguay	56.93	

Final – October 14

Rank	Lane	Name	Nationality	Time	Notes
1st place, gold medalist(s)		Fanor Escobar	Colombia	50.63	
2nd place, silver medalist(s)		Bruno De Genaro	Argentina	50.68	
3rd place, bronze medalist(s)		Hederson Estefani	Brazil	50.99	
4		Kevin Mina	Colombia	51.44	
5		Alfredo Sepúlveda	Chile	51.69	
6		Julio Rodríguez	Venezuela	52.04	
7		Diego Courbis	Chile	52.32	
8		Marcio Teles	Brazil	54.48	

=== 3000 meters steeplechase ===
October 15

Rank	Name	Nationality	Time	Notes
1st place, gold medalist(s)	Gerard Giraldo	Colombia	8:40.28	
2nd place, silver medalist(s)	Carlos San Martín	Colombia	8:52.46	
3rd place, bronze medalist(s)	Diddier Rodríguez	Panama	8:54.61	
4	Gleison Santos	Brazil	9:03.72	
	Yuri Labra	Peru	DNF	
	Julio Palomino	Peru	DNF	

=== 4 × 100 meters relay ===
14 October

Rank	Lane	Nation	Competitors	Time	Notes
1st place, gold medalist(s)	6	Venezuela	David Vivas, Rafael Vásquez, Alexis Nieves, Abdel Kalil	39.47	
2nd place, silver medalist(s)	5	Paraguay	Jonathan Wolk, Fredy Maidana, Nilo Duré, César Almirón	39.60	
3rd place, bronze medalist(s)	3	Colombia	Jhonny Rentería, Carlos Flórez, Óscar Baltán, Carlos Palacios	39.74	
4	4	Ecuador	Alan Minda, Anderson Marquinez, Steeven Salas, Francisco Tejeda	40.98	
	7	Brazil	Rodrigo do Nascimento, Felipe Bardi, Lucas da Silva, Erik Cardoso	DNF	

=== 4 × 400 meters relay ===
15 October

Rank	Lane	Nation	Competitors	Time	Notes
1st place, gold medalist(s)	4	Venezuela	Julio Rodríguez, José Maita, Javier Gómez, Kelvis Padrino	3:06.54	
2nd place, silver medalist(s)	3	Brazil	Lucas da Silva, Lucas Carvalho, Douglas da Silva, Vitor de Miranda	3:06.79	
3rd place, bronze medalist(s)	5	Colombia	Nicolás Salinas, Kevin Mina, Neiker Abello, Raúl Mena	3:09.40	
4	7	Chile	Enzo Faulbaum, Martín Zabala, Martín Kouyoumejian, Alfredo Sepúlveda	3:10.00	
5	6	Ecuador	Anderson Marquinez, Alan Minda, Francisco Tejeda, Steeven Salas	3:17.27	
6	2	Paraguay	Gustavo Mongelos, Paul Wood, Jhumiler Sánchez, Marcos González	3:22.74	

=== 20 kilometers walk ===
October 12

Rank	Name	Nationality	Time	Notes
1st place, gold medalist(s)	Brian Pintado	Ecuador	1:19:43	GR
2nd place, silver medalist(s)	David Hurtado	Ecuador	1:20:44	
3rd place, bronze medalist(s)	Caio Bonfim	Brazil	1:21:01	
4	Éider Arévalo	Colombia	1:27:00	
	Manuel Esteban Soto	Colombia	DNF	
	Luis Henry Campos	Peru	DNF	
	César Rodríguez	Peru	DNF	

=== 35 kilometers walk ===
October 14

Rank	Name	Nationality	Time	Notes
1st place, gold medalist(s)	Caio Bonfim	Brazil	2:34:17	GR
2nd place, silver medalist(s)	César Rodríguez	Peru	2:35:20	
3rd place, bronze medalist(s)	Diego Pinzón	Colombia	2:35:27	
4	Juan Manuel Cano	Argentina	2:39:56	
5	Jorge Armando Ruiz	Colombia	2:50:38	
	Luis Henry Campos	Peru	DNF	
	Andrés Chocho	Ecuador	DNF	

=== High jump ===
October 13

Rank	Name	Nationality	1.75	1.80	1.85	2.00	2.05	2.10	2.13	2.16	2.19	2.22	Result	Notes
1st place, gold medalist(s)	Thiago Moura	Brazil	–	–	–	–	xo	o	o	xxo	xxo	xxx	2.19	
2nd place, silver medalist(s)	Gilmar Correa	Colombia	–	–	–	–	o	xo	xxo	xxx			2.13	
3rd place, bronze medalist(s)	Nicolás Numair	Chile	–	–	–	o	xo	xxo	xxx				2.10	
4	Pedro Alamos	Chile	–	–	–	–	o	xxx					2.05	
5	André Bergen	Paraguay	–	xo	xxx								1.80	
	Carlos Layoy	Argentina	–	–	–	x–	xx						NM	
	Sebastián Morinigo	Paraguay	xxx										NM	

=== Pole vault ===
October 15

Rank	Name	Nationality	5.00	5.10	5.20	5.30	5.35	5.45	5.50	5.55	Result	Notes
1st place, gold medalist(s)	Germán Chiaraviglio	Argentina	–	–	o	–	xxo	o	–	xxx	5.45	
2nd place, silver medalist(s)	Dyander Pacho	Ecuador	xxo	–	xo	xxo	o	xxx			5.35	
3rd place, bronze medalist(s)	Augusto Dutra de Oliveira	Brazil	–	–	–	o	–	–	xxx		5.30	
4	Austin Ramos	Ecuador	o	xxo	xo	xo	xxx				5.30	
5	Walter Viáfara	Colombia	o	xxx							5.00	

=== Long jump ===
October 12

Rank	Name	Nationality	#1	#2	#3	#4	#5	#6	Result	Notes
1st place, gold medalist(s)	José Luis Mandros	Peru	7.82	7.80	7.73	8.07	–	x	8.07	
2nd place, silver medalist(s)	Emiliano Lasa	Uruguay	7.65	7.67	7.71	7.65	7.93	7.85	7.93	
3rd place, bronze medalist(s)	Jhon Berrío	Colombia	7.72	7.89	7.69	7.53	7.62	7.23	7.89	
4	Arnovis Dalmero	Colombia	7.59	x	7.63	7.52	7.49	x	7.63	
5	Lucas dos Santos	Brazil	7.40	7.57	x	7.48	6.02	7.45	7.57	
6	Gabriel Ferrari	Argentina	7.22	7.25	7.37	7.44	x	x	7.44	
7	Eubrig Maza	Venezuela	7.14	7.20	7.06	6.55	–	–	7.20	
8	Alexsandro Melo	Brazil	x	7.10	6.86				7.10	
9	Juan Gabriel Lugo	Paraguay	6.57	6.33	6.64				6.64	
10	Miguel Espinola	Paraguay	x	6.54	x				6.54	

=== Triple jump ===
October 14

Rank	Name	Nationality	#1	#2	#3	#4	#5	#6	Result	Notes
1st place, gold medalist(s)	Leodan Torrealba	Venezuela	15.89	16.30	x	16.31	16.27	–	16.31	
2nd place, silver medalist(s)	Frixon Chila	Ecuador	x	15.85	15.93	x	16.03	x	16.03	
3rd place, bronze medalist(s)	Mateus de Sá	Brazil	x	15.98	x	x	x	15.95	15.98	
4	Geiner Moreno	Colombia	15.58	15.58	15.46	15.59	15.15	–	15.59	
5	Alexsandro de Melo	Brazil	x	15.22	15.47	x	x	–	15.47	
	José María Centurión	Paraguay	x	x	x	–	x	–	NM	

=== Shot put ===
October 14

Rank	Name	Nationality	#1	#2	#3	#4	#5	#6	Result	Notes
1st place, gold medalist(s)	Welington Morais	Brazil	19.46	19.07	19.52	20.00	19.33	x	20.00	
2nd place, silver medalist(s)	Willian Dourado	Brazil	19.02	19.77	19.54	19.64	19.03	19.48	19.77	
3rd place, bronze medalist(s)	Nazareno Sasia	Argentina	19.15	x	19.53	x	19.52	19.73	19.73	
4	Juan Ignacio Carballo	Argentina	18.28	18.41	18.58	18.31	19.32	x	19.32	
5	Mario González	Venezuela	16.59	17.52	16.83	17.15	17.42	17.26	17.52	
6	Janique Pallees	Suriname	15.79	16.09	15.97	15.60	15.52	16.35	16.35	

=== Discus throw ===
October 15

Rank	Name	Nationality	#1	#2	#3	#4	#5	#6	Result	Notes
1st place, gold medalist(s)	Claudio Romero	Chile	59.82	60.39	64.99	x	62.83	64.36	64.99	GR, NR
2nd place, silver medalist(s)	Mauricio Ortega	Colombia	63.59	x	62.55	61.90	x	x	63.59	
3rd place, bronze medalist(s)	Juan José Caicedo	Ecuador	60.16	58.90	62.10	61.38	x	61.76	62.10	
4	Alan de Falchi	Brazil	x	56.40	x	55.07	56.45	x	56.45	
5	Juan Ignacio Solito	Argentina	50.82	54.12	52.66	55.26	53.33	53.28	55.26	

=== Hammer throw ===
October 12

Rank	Name	Nationality	#1	#2	#3	#4	#5	#6	Result	Notes
1st place, gold medalist(s)	Gabriel Kehr	Chile	74.78	76.06	75.94	75.05	76.81	76.07	76.81	GR
2nd place, silver medalist(s)	Humberto Mansilla	Chile	73.73	74.12	x	x	73.19	71.08	74.12	
3rd place, bronze medalist(s)	Joaquin Gómez	Argentina	66.43	69.77	72.01	68.22	71.22	73.56	73.56	
4	Allan Wolski	Brazil	x	69.39	x	70.54	68.83	69.76	70.54	
5	Santiago Sasiaín	Paraguay	53.76	x	56.63	55.91	55.15	55.65	56.63	
6	Silvio Ovelar	Paraguay	52.85	51.19	49.63	51.07	51.15	52.29	52.85	

=== Javelin throw ===
October 13

Rank	Name	Nationality	#1	#2	#3	#4	#5	#6	Result	Notes
1st place, gold medalist(s)	Luiz Maurício da Silva	Brazil	67.66	73.80	71.15	x	70.94	76.90	76.90	
2nd place, silver medalist(s)	Billy Julio	Colombia	55.77	57.03	74.38	68.75	68.20		74.38	
3rd place, bronze medalist(s)	Antonio Ortiz	Paraguay	62.40	x	59.01	59.20	x	70.96	70.96	
4	Pedro Henrique Rodrigues	Brazil	67.84	x	x	x	67.82	x	67.84	
5	Giovanni Díaz	Paraguay	66.42	66.30	63.50	66.13	65.63	67.41	67.41	
6	Jonathan Cedeño	Panama	63.12	60.47	64.58	64.12	64.83	60.81	64.83	
7	Francisco Muse	Chile	57.26	62.40	60.32	59.93	x	63.50	63.50	
8	Lautaro Techera	Uruguay	61.89	62.29	62.94	x	54.73	63.20	63.20	

=== Decathlon ===
October 12–13

The highest mark recorded in each event is highlighted in yellow

Rank	Athlete	Nationality	100m	LJ	SP	HJ	400m	110m H	DT	PV	JT	1500m	Points	Notes
1st place, gold medalist(s)	Felipe dos Santos	Brazil	10.50	6.99	13.58	1.90	49.30	14.28	40.98	4.80	50.51	4:57.55	7692	
2nd place, silver medalist(s)	Andy Preciado	Ecuador	11.22	6.61	15.60	2.02	51.60	14.50	51.19	4.20	57.06	4:56.43	7679	
3rd place, bronze medalist(s)	Gerson Izaguirre	Venezuela	11.10	7.03	14.32	1.90	51.30	14.37	41.14	4.50	53.05	5:03.77	7424	
4	José Fernando Ferreira	Brazil	11.16	6.97	13.33	1.93	51.62	14.87	42.74	4.30	57.48	5:25.11	7211	
5	Lars Flaming	Paraguay	12.38	5.32	11.15	1.72	57.00	18.55	37.64	3.10	59.78	4:59.01	5430	

== Women's results ==
=== 100 meters ===
Heats – October 13
Wind:
Heat 1: -0.9 m/s, Heat 2: -0.3 m/s

Rank	Heat	Name	Nationality	Time	Notes
1	1	Ángela Tenorio	Ecuador	11.64	Q
2	1	Ana Carolina Azevedo	Brazil	11.68	Q
3	2	María Florencia Lamboglia	Argentina	11.71	Q
4	2	Shelsy Romero	Colombia	11.92	Q
5	1	Leticia Arispe	Bolivia	11.98	Q
6	2	Guadalupe Torrez	Bolivia	12.01	Q
7	1	Angélica Gamboa	Colombia	12.10	q
8	2	Xenia Hiebert	Paraguay	12.14	q
9	2	Vitória Cristina Rosa	Brazil	12.26	
10	1	Araceli Contrera	Paraguay	12.38	

Final – October 13

Wind: 0.0 m/s

Rank	Lane	Name	Nationality	Time	Notes
1st place, gold medalist(s)	3	Ana Carolina Azevedo	Brazil	11.75	
2nd place, silver medalist(s)	5	María Florencia Lamboglia	Argentina	11.90	
3rd place, bronze medalist(s)	6	Ángela Tenorio	Ecuador	11.93	
4	4	Shelsy Romero	Colombia	12.07	
5	2	Angélica Gamboa	Colombia	12.11	
6	7	Leticia Arispe	Bolivia	12.15	
7	8	Guadalupe Torrez	Bolivia	12.18	
8	1	Xenia Hiebert	Paraguay	12.25	

=== 200 meters ===
Heats – October 14
Wind:
Heat 1: +1.0 m/s, Heat 2: +0.2 m/s

Rank	Heat	Name	Nationality	Time	Notes
1	2	Anahí Suárez	Ecuador	23.06	Q
2	1	Orangy Jiménez	Venezuela	23.31	Q
3	1	Martina Weil	Chile	23.46	Q
4	1	Nicole Caicedo	Ecuador	23.58	Q
5	1	Shary Vallecilla	Colombia	24.00	q
6	2	Ana Carolina Azevedo	Brazil	24.70	Q
7	2	Xenia Hiebert	Paraguay	25.14	Q
8	2	Leticia Arispe	Bolivia	25.15	q
9	2	Laura Martínez	Colombia	25.22	
10	1	Ruth Báez	Paraguay	25.20	
	1	Vitória Cristina Rosa	Brazil	DNS	
	2	María Florencia Lamboglia	Argentina	DNS	

Final – October 14

Wind: -0.3 m/s

Rank	Lane	Name	Nationality	Time	Notes
1st place, gold medalist(s)	6	Anahí Suárez	Ecuador	23.06	
2nd place, silver medalist(s)	3	Orangy Jiménez	Venezuela	23.33	
3rd place, bronze medalist(s)	5	Ana Carolina Azevedo	Brazil	23.43	
4	4	Martina Weil	Chile	23.48	
5	7	Nicole Caicedo	Ecuador	23.67	
6	1	Shary Vallecilla	Colombia	23.75	
7	8	Xenia Hiebert	Paraguay	25.00	
8	2	Leticia Arispe	Bolivia	25.35	

=== 400 meters ===
October 13

Rank	Lane	Name	Nationality	Time	Notes
1st place, gold medalist(s)	3	Evelis Aguilar	Colombia	51.90	
2nd place, silver medalist(s)	5	Martina Weil	Chile	51.92	
3rd place, bronze medalist(s)	4	Anahí Suárez	Ecuador	52.24	
4	6	Tiffani Marinho	Brazil	54.11	
5	7	Cecilia Gómez	Bolivia	56.04	
6	2	Ibeyis Romero	Venezuela	56.47	
7	1	Fatima Amarilla	Paraguay	57.60	
8	8	Araceli Martínez	Paraguay	59.29	

=== 800 meters ===
October 15

Rank	Name	Nationality	Time	Notes
1st place, gold medalist(s)	Déborah Rodríguez	Uruguay	2:08.14	
2nd place, silver medalist(s)	Jaqueline Weber	Brazil	2:08.97	
3rd place, bronze medalist(s)	Rosangelica Escobar	Colombia	2:09.56	
4	Andrea Calderón	Ecuador	2:10.21	
5	Martina Escudero	Argentina	2:10.42	
6	Anita Poma	Peru	2:11.58	
7	Berdine Castillo	Chile	2:14.45	
8	María Leticia Añazco	Paraguay	2:15.85	
9	Araceli Martínez	Paraguay	2:15.99	

=== 1500 meters ===
October 13

Rank	Name	Nationality	Time	Notes
1st place, gold medalist(s)	Fedra Luna	Argentina	4:14.69	GR, NR
2nd place, silver medalist(s)	Mariana Borelli	Argentina	4:16.49	
3rd place, bronze medalist(s)	Jaqueline Weber	Brazil	4:17.50	
4	Joselyn Brea	Venezuela	4:20.08	
5	Josefa Quezada	Chile	4:20.54	
6	Muriel Coneo	Colombia	4:20.69	
7	Anita Poma	Peru	4:21.31	
8	María Pía Fernández	Uruguay	4:30.08	
9	María Leticia Añazco	Paraguay	4:48.41	
	María Caballero	Paraguay	DNS	

=== 5000 meters ===
October 14

Rank	Name	Nationality	Time	Notes
1st place, gold medalist(s)	Fedra Luna	Argentina	15:41.78	GR
2nd place, silver medalist(s)	Joselyn Brea	Venezuela	15:42.70	
3rd place, bronze medalist(s)	Luz Mery Rojas	Peru	15:49.85	
4	Micaela Levaggi	Argentina	15:49.90	
5	Edymar Brea	Venezuela	16:10.95	
6	Muriel Coneo	Colombia	16:20.53	
7	Josefa Quezada	Chile	16:23.13	
8	Jovana De La Cruz	Peru	16:32.95	
	Jhoselyn Camargo	Bolivia	DNS	
	Fatima Vázquez	Paraguay	DNS	

=== 10,000 meters ===
October 14

Rank	Name	Nationality	Time	Notes
1st place, gold medalist(s)	Florencia Borelli	Argentina	33:43.37	
2nd place, silver medalist(s)	Daiana Ocampo	Argentina	33:46.47	
3rd place, bronze medalist(s)	Luz Mery Rojas	Peru	33:50.44	
4	Jovana De La Cruz	Peru	34:17.05	
5	Edymar Brea	Venezuela	34:27.44	
6	Silvia Ortiz	Ecuador	34:38.68	
7	Jhoselyn Camargo	Bolivia	34:49.30	
	Fatima Vázquez	Paraguay	DNF	

=== Marathon ===
October 15

Rank	Name	Nationality	Time	Notes
1st place, gold medalist(s)	Rosa Chacha	Ecuador	2:34:26	GR
2nd place, silver medalist(s)	Soledad Torre	Peru	2:37:03	
3rd place, bronze medalist(s)	Helen Baltazar	Bolivia	2:50:31	
4	Carmen Martínez	Paraguay	2:57:47	
	Fatima Romero	Paraguay	DNF	
	Tania Chávez	Bolivia	DNF	
	Andrea Bonilla	Ecuador	DNF	

=== 100 meters hurdles ===
October 13
Wind: +0.2 m/s

Rank	Lane	Name	Nationality	Time	Notes
1st place, gold medalist(s)	3	Yoveinny Mota	Venezuela	13.60	
2nd place, silver medalist(s)	5	Micaela de Mello	Brazil	13.69	
3rd place, bronze medalist(s)	4	María Alejandra Murillo	Colombia	14.06	
4	2	Mariza Karabia	Paraguay	14.57	
5	7	Rosmary Paredes	Paraguay	14.94	
6	6	Diana Bazalar	Peru	15.44	

=== 400 meters hurdles ===
October 14

Rank	Lane	Name	Nationality	Time	Notes
1st place, gold medalist(s)		Valeria Cabezas	Colombia	57.17	
2nd place, silver medalist(s)		Chayenne da Silva	Brazil	57.91	
3rd place, bronze medalist(s)		Liliane Parrela	Brazil	57.92	
4		Tania Guasace	Bolivia	1:02.20	
5		Fatima Amarilla	Paraguay	1:04.77	
6		María Paz Ramírez	Paraguay	1:05.09	

=== 3000 meters steeplechase ===
October 15

Rank	Name	Nationality	Time	Notes
1st place, gold medalist(s)	Belén Casetta	Argentina	10:23.28	
2nd place, silver medalist(s)	Mirelle da Silva	Brazil	10:25.58	
3rd place, bronze medalist(s)	Stefany López	Colombia	10:26.82	
4	Margarita Núñez	Peru	10:41.02	
5	Carolina Lozano	Argentina	10:52.98	
6	Veronica Huacasi	Peru	11:37.91	
7	Daniela Rivera	Paraguay	12:32.81	

=== 4 × 100 meters relay ===
14 October

Rank	Lane	Nation	Competitors	Time	Notes
1st place, gold medalist(s)	3	Colombia	Angélica Gamboa, Evelyn Rivera, Melany Bolaño, María Alejandra Murillo	44.61	
2nd place, silver medalist(s)	4	Chile	Macarena Borie, María Ignacia Montt, Isidora Jiménez, Javiera Cañas	45.04	
3rd place, bronze medalist(s)	7	Brazil	Vida Aurora, Ana Azevedo, Gabriela Mourão, Micaela de Mello	45.43	
4	5	Paraguay	Noelia Vera, Macarena Giménez, Araceli Contrera, Xenia Hiebert	46.37	
5	2	Bolivia	Leticia Arispe, Cecilia Gómez, Valeria Quispe, Guadalupe Torrez	47.34	
	6	Ecuador	Nicole Caicedo, Anahí Suárez, Yuliana Angulo, Ángela Tenorio	DNF	

=== 4 × 400 meters relay ===
15 October

Rank	Lane	Nation	Competitors	Time	Notes
1st place, gold medalist(s)		Colombia	Lina Licona, Rosangélica Escobar, Valeria Cabezas, Evelis Aguilar	3:31.30	GR
2nd place, silver medalist(s)		Brazil	Tábata de Carvalho, Liliane Parrela, Maria Victória de Sena, Tiffani Marinho	3:35.61	
3rd place, bronze medalist(s)		Chile	Rocío Muñoz, Berdine Castillo, Poulette Cardoch, Martina Weil	3:37.58	
4		Ecuador	Evelin Mercado, Andrea Calderón, Anahí Suárez, Nicole Caicedo	3:39.87	
5		Paraguay	Araceli Martínez, María Leticia Añazco, Araceli Contrera, Fatima Amarilla	4:03.52	

=== 20 kilometers walk ===
October 12

Rank	Name	Nationality	Time	Notes
1st place, gold medalist(s)	Glenda Morejón	Ecuador	1:31:34	GR
2nd place, silver medalist(s)	Viviane Lyra	Brazil	1:32:31	
3rd place, bronze medalist(s)	Evelyn Inga	Peru	1:35:49	
4	Ángela Castro	Bolivia	1:41:13	

=== 35 kilometers walk ===
October 14

Rank	Name	Nationality	Time	Notes
1st place, gold medalist(s)	Viviane Lyra	Brazil	2:50:57	GR
2nd place, silver medalist(s)	Karla Jaramillo	Ecuador	2:54:01	
3rd place, bronze medalist(s)	Evelyn Inga	Peru	2:54:54	
4	Magaly Bonilla	Ecuador	2:56:58	
5	Sandra Galvis	Colombia	3:00:58	
6	Arabelly Orjuela	Colombia	3:02:55	
7	Casandra Nieto	Bolivia	3:37:49	
	Ángela Castro	Bolivia	DNS	

=== High jump ===
October 12

Rank	Name	Nationality	1.65	1.70	1.75	1.78	1.81	1.84	1.87	1.90	Result	Notes
1st place, gold medalist(s)	Valdiléia Martins	Brazil	–	–	o	o	o	o	o	xxx	1.87	
2nd place, silver medalist(s)	Glenka Antonia	Curaçao	–	o	o	xo	xo	xxx			1.81	
3rd place, bronze medalist(s)	Sarah Freitas	Brazil	o	o	o	o	xxx				1.78	
4	Ariana Kasiel	Venezuela	o	x–	o	xxx					1.75	
4	Jennifer Rodríguez	Colombia	–	o	o	xxx					1.75	
6	Joice Micolta	Ecuador	–	xo	xxo	xxx					1.75	
7	Antonia Merino	Chile	o	o	xxx						1.70	
8	Carla Ríos	Bolivia	o	xxx							1.65	

=== Pole vault ===
October 14

Rank	Name	Nationality	3.70	3.80	3.90	4.00	4.10	4.20	4.30	Result	Notes
1st place, gold medalist(s)	Robeilys Peinado	Venezuela	–	–	o	o	o	o	xxx	4.20	
2nd place, silver medalist(s)	Juliana Campos	Brazil	–	–	o	–	o	xo	xxx	4.20	
3rd place, bronze medalist(s)	Isabel de Quadros	Brazil	–	–	xo	–	xo	xxx		4.10	
4	Antonia Crestani	Chile	o	xxx						3.70	
	Katherine Castillo	Colombia	–	–	xxx					NM	

=== Long jump ===
October 13

Rank	Name	Nationality	#1	#2	#3	#4	#5	#6	Result	Notes
1st place, gold medalist(s)	Leticia Oro Melo	Brazil	6.64	x	6.46	6.46	6.47	–	6.64	
2nd place, silver medalist(s)	Natalia Linares	Colombia	6.28	6.24	6.43	x	x	6.38	6.43	
3rd place, bronze medalist(s)	Yuliana Angulo	Ecuador	6.22	x	x	5.99	x	x	6.22	
4	Nathalee Aranda	Panama	6.02	5.88	6.04	5.74	x	5.88	6.04	
5	Ana Paula Argüello	Paraguay	5.87	5.60	x	5.65	5.86	5.76	5.87	
6	Rocío Muñoz	Chile	x	5.63	x	5.55	x	5.63	5.63	
7	Noelia Vera	Paraguay	x	x	5.39	5.45	x	5.50	5.50	
8	Glenka Antonia	Curaçao	5.15	x	x	3.95	x	–	5.15	

=== Triple jump ===
October 14

Rank	Name	Nationality	#1	#2	#3	#4	#5	#6	Result	Notes
1st place, gold medalist(s)	Gabriele dos Santos	Brazil	12.73	13.42	13.69	13.74	13.45	13.66	13.74	
2nd place, silver medalist(s)	Liuba Zaldívar	Ecuador	13.29	13.04	13.49	13.29	x	13.44	13.49	
3rd place, bronze medalist(s)	Núbia Soares	Brazil	x	13.10	x	x	x	13.04	13.10	
4	Valeria Quispe	Bolivia	12.20	12.68	12.89	12.83	x	12.81	12.89	
5	Estrella Lobo	Colombia	12.57	x	12.51	x	12.38	12.24	12.57	
6	Ana Paula Argüello	Paraguay	x	12.46	12.48	12.51	x	11.14	12.51	

=== Shot put ===
October 14

Rank	Name	Nationality	#1	#2	#3	#4	#5	#6	Result	Notes
1st place, gold medalist(s)	Natalia Duco	Chile	16.65	16.72	16.86	16.84	16.79	17.08	17.08	
2nd place, silver medalist(s)	Ivana Gallardo	Chile	14.42	x	x	15.46	16.72	16.73	16.73	
3rd place, bronze medalist(s)	Ana Caroline da Silva	Brazil	14.94	16.40	15.70	15.82	16.09	16.09	16.40	
4	Fedra Florentín	Paraguay	13.11	13.55	x	x	13.31	13.36	13.55	
5	Alicia Grootfaam	Suriname	x	x	11.00	11.47	11.79	12.75	12.75	
	Maria Fernanda de Aviz	Brazil							DNS	

=== Discus throw ===
October 14

Rank	Name	Nationality	#1	#2	#3	#4	#5	#6	Result	Notes
1st place, gold medalist(s)	Izabela da Silva	Brazil	60.86	x	x	56.03	58.76	59.25	60.86	GR
2nd place, silver medalist(s)	Andressa de Morais	Brazil	56.90	56.92	60.10	57.69	56.81	x	60.10	
3rd place, bronze medalist(s)	Karen Gallardo	Chile	57.62	55.16	x	56.45	57.18	57.13	57.62	
4	Yerlin Mesa	Colombia	55.39	53.41	x	48.58	55.04	53.60	55.39	
5	Ailén Armada	Argentina	53.89	x	50.79	54.08	x	x	54.08	
6	Catalina Bravo	Chile	46.83	45.77	x	x	x	x	46.83	
7	Yerilda Zapata	Venezuela	x	40.66	x	x	x	x	40.66	

=== Hammer throw ===
October 12

Rank	Name	Nationality	#1	#2	#3	#4	#5	#6	Result	Notes
1st place, gold medalist(s)	Rosa Rodríguez	Venezuela	x	x	65.59	x	68.90	68.25	68.90	
2nd place, silver medalist(s)	Mayra Gaviria	Colombia	x	65.40	x	61.26	65.10	61.59	65.40	
3rd place, bronze medalist(s)	Ximena Zorrilla	Peru	x	59.11	58.06	60.20	62.67	62.78	62.78	
4	Mariana Marcelino	Brazil	59.79	x	58.79	x	x	58.27	59.79	
5	Silennis Vargas	Venezuela	x	x	56.53	57.19	x	56.87	57.19	
6	María del Pilar Piccardo	Paraguay	x	x	48.86	x	51.80	49.32	51.80	
7	Nair Godoy	Paraguay	x	46.74	46.76	x	47.94	x	47.94	

=== Javelin throw ===
October 13

Rank	Name	Nationality	#1	#2	#3	#4	#5	#6	Result	Notes
1st place, gold medalist(s)	Flor Ruiz	Colombia	61.10	59.81	x	62.97	62.26	61.88	62.97	GR
2nd place, silver medalist(s)	Jucilene de Lima	Brazil	53.75	x	62.42	58.28	x	61.35	62.42	
3rd place, bronze medalist(s)	Juleisy Angulo	Ecuador	56.71	61.10	–	56.62	53.27	55.06	61.10	NR
4	Manuela Rotundo	Uruguay	47.62	46.66	45.14	48.94	53.23	x	53.23	
5	Laura Paredes	Paraguay	x	49.10	46.92	x	49.90	47.06	49.90	
6	Fiorella Veloso	Paraguay	46.17	44.71	46.21	46.97	42.74	47.66	47.66	
7	Yiset Jiménez	Colombia	44.24	–	–	r			44.24	

=== Heptathlon ===
October 14–15

The highest mark recorded in each event is highlighted in yellow

Rank	Athlete	Nationality	100m H	HJ	SP	200m	LJ	JT	800m	Points	Notes
1st place, gold medalist(s)	Martha Araújo	Colombia	13.34	1.68	13.71	25.37	6.17	54.22 PB	2:26.58	6112	GR
2nd place, silver medalist(s)	Ana Camila Pirelli	Paraguay	13.90	1.65	13.81	25.23	5.46	45.63	2:17.55	5756	
3rd place, bronze medalist(s)	Joice Micolta	Ecuador	14.70	1.77	11.97	27.01	5.56	42.50	2:23.93	5396	
4	Jenifer Norberto	Brazil	14.35	1.68	12.61	26.38	5.83	31.78	2:23.20	5314	
5	Raiane Procopio	Brazil	15.13	1.65	12.18	27.16	5.47	43.73	2:33.91	5067	

== Mixed ==
=== 4 × 400 meters relay ===
12 October

Rank	Lane	Nation	Competitors	Time	Notes
1st place, gold medalist(s)		Brazil	Anderson Freitas, Maria Victória de Sena, Douglas da Silva, Tábata de Carvalho	3:21.53	GR
2nd place, silver medalist(s)		Ecuador	Francisco Tejeda, Evelyn Mercado, Alan Minda, Nicole Caicedo	3:22.27	NR
3rd place, bronze medalist(s)		Colombia	Nicolás Salinas, Rosangélica Escobar, Raúl Mena, Lina Licona	3:22.87	
4		Venezuela	Kelvis Padrino, Yoveinny Mota, José Antonio Maita, Orangy Jiménez	3:22.91	
5		Paraguay	Marcos González, Fatima Amarilla, Paul Wood, Araceli Martínez	3:36.36	
