= Génesis Romero =

Venezuelan athlete (born 1995)

Personal information
- Full name: Génesis Josianne Romero Fernández
- Born: 6 November 1995 (age 30)
- Height: 1.76 m (5 ft 9 in)
- Weight: 60 kg (132 lb)

Sport
- Sport: Athletics
- Events: 100 m hurdles, long jump

Génesis Josianne Romero Fernández (born 6 November 1995) is a Venezuelan athlete specialising in the 100 metres hurdles and long jump. She won the gold medal at the 2018 South American Games.

Her personal best in the 100 m hurdles (and the current national record) is 13.08 seconds, set in Cochabamba in 2018.

== International competitions ==
Year	Competition	Venue	Position	Event	Notes
Representing Venezuela
2011	ALBA Games	Barquisimeto, Venezuela	3rd	100 m hurdles	14.74
2011	ALBA Games	Barquisimeto, Venezuela	6th	Long jump	5.40 m
2012	Ibero-American Championships	Barquisimeto, Venezuela	9th (h)	100 m hurdles	14.17
2012	Ibero-American Championships	Barquisimeto, Venezuela	5th	Long jump	5.82 m
2012	World Junior Championships	Barcelona, Spain	42nd (h)	100 m hurdles	14.42
2012	South American U23 Championships	São Paulo, Brazil	2nd	100 m hurdles	14.58
2012	South American U23 Championships	São Paulo, Brazil	4th	4 × 100 m relay	46.61
2012	South American U23 Championships	São Paulo, Brazil	5th	Long jump	5.60 m
2012	South American Youth Championships	Mendoza, Argentina	1st	100 m hurdles (76.2 cm)	14.32
2013	South American Championships	Cartagena, Colombia	5th	100 m hurdles	14.17
2013	South American Championships	Cartagena, Colombia	3rd	4 × 100 m relay	45.44
2013	Pan American Junior Championships	Medellín, Colombia	3rd	100 m hurdles	13.65
2013	Pan American Junior Championships	Medellín, Colombia	2nd	Long jump	6.04 m
2013	Pan American Junior Championships	Medellín, Colombia	4th	4 × 100 m relay	46.70
2013	Bolivarian Games	Trujillo, Peru	5th	100 m hurdles	13.91
2014	South American Games	Santiago, Chile	7th	100 m hurdles	13.84
2014	South American Games	Santiago, Chile	5th	Long jump	5.92 m
2014	World Junior Championships	Eugene, United States	5th	100 m hurdles	13.26
2014	World Junior Championships	Eugene, United States	10th	Long jump	5.88 m
2014	South American U23 Championships	Montevideo, Uruguay	1st	100 m hurdles	13.51 (w)
2014	South American U23 Championships	Montevideo, Uruguay	2nd	4 × 100 m relay	46.50
2014	South American U23 Championships	Montevideo, Uruguay	5th	Long jump	5.99 m
2014	Central American and Caribbean Games	Xalapa, Mexico	5th	100 m hurdles	13.63
2015	South American Championships	Lima, Peru	4th	100 m hurdles	13.85
2015	South American Championships	Lima, Peru	6th	Long jump	5.93 m
2015	Pan American Games	Toronto, Canada	15th (h)	100 m hurdles	13.37 (w)
2016	Ibero-American Championships	Rio de Janeiro, Brazil	4th	100 m hurdles	13.24
2017	South American Championships	Asunción, Paraguay	2nd	100 m hurdles	13.16
2017	South American Championships	Asunción, Paraguay	–	4 × 100 m relay	DNF
2017	Bolivarian Games	Santa Marta, Colombia	1st	100 m hurdles	13.19
2017	Bolivarian Games	Santa Marta, Colombia	4th	400 m hurdles	60.14
2017	Bolivarian Games	Santa Marta, Colombia	1st	4 × 100 m relay	44.15
2018	South American Games	Cochabamba, Bolivia	1st	100 m hurdles	13.08
2018	South American Games	Cochabamba, Bolivia	1st	4 × 100 m relay	44.71
2018	Central American and Caribbean Games	Barranquilla, Colombia	4th	100 m hurdles	13.18
2018	Central American and Caribbean Games	Barranquilla, Colombia	6th	4 × 100 m relay	45.71
2019	South American Championships	Lima, Peru	1st	100 m hurdles	13.29
2019	South American Championships	Lima, Peru	5th	Long jump	6.24 m
2019	Pan American Games	Lima, Peru	8th	100 m hurdles	13.44
2019	Pan American Games	Lima, Peru	6th	4 × 100 m relay	44.73
2019	World Championships	Doha, Qatar	20th (sf)	100 m hurdles	13.18
2025	South American Indoor Championships	Cochabamba, Bolivia	10th (h)	60 m	7.73
2025	South American Indoor Championships	Cochabamba, Bolivia	3rd	60 m hurdles	8.30
2025	South American Championships	Mar del Plata, Argentina	4th	100 m hurdles	13.59 (w)
2025	South American Championships	Mar del Plata, Argentina	5th	Heptathlon	4990 pts

== Personal bests ==
- 100 metres – 11.71 (-0.7 m/s, Barquisimeto 2018)
- 200 metres – 23.90 (+0.7 m/s, Barquisimeto 2018)
- 100 metres hurdles – 12.97 (+0.7 m/s, Marseille 2019)
- 400 metres hurdles – 1:00.14 (Santa Marta 2017)
- Long jump – 6.38 (+0.6 m/s, Barinas 2015)
