= 2015 British Indoor Athletics Championships =

- Dates: 14-15 February
- Host city: Sheffield
- Venue: EIS Sheffield
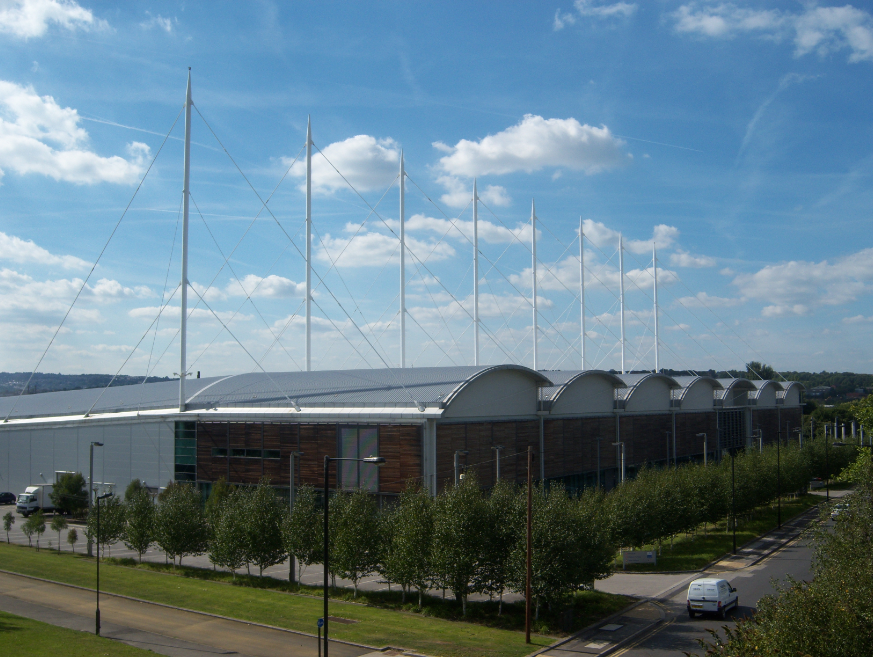
- Level: Senior national
- Type: Indoor
- Events: 26

The 2015 British Indoor Athletics Championships was an indoor track and field competition held from 14 to 15 February 2015 at the English Institute of Sport, Sheffield, England. A range of indoor events were held. It served as a qualifier for the British team at the 2017 European Athletics Indoor Championships.

== Medal summary ==
=== Men ===
| Event | Gold | | Silver | | Bronze | |
|---|---|---|---|---|---|---|
| 60 metres | Chijindu Ujah | 6.57 | Sean Safo-Antwi | 6.66 | Roy Ejiakuekwu | 6.72 |
| 200 metres | Antonio Infantino | 20.96 | Omololu Abiodun | 21.18 | Dannish Walker-Khan | 21.35 |
| 400 metres | Nigel Levine | 46.86 | Jarryd Dunn | 47.05 | Jamie Bowie | 47.18 |
| 800 metres | Guy Learmonth | 1:49.00 | James Bowness | 1:49.06 | Mukhtar Mohammed | 1:49.12 |
| 1500 metres | Charlie Grice | 3:49.79 | Ben Coldray | 3:52.28 | John Ashcroft | 3:52.48 |
| 3000 metres | Lee Emanuel | 8:03.92 | Philip Hurst | 8:05.31 | Thomas Lancashire | 8:05.53 |
| 60 metres hurdles | Lawrence Clarke | 7.69 | David Omoregie | 7.78 | David King | 7.82 |
| 3000 metres walk | Tom Bosworth | 11:30.35 | Callum Wilkinson | 12:24.38 | Creighton Connolly | 12:25.68 |
| High jump | Allan Smith | 2.29 m | Chris Kandu | 2.18 m | Matthew Roberts | 2.13 m |
| Pole vault | Luke Cutts | 5.55 m | Andrew Sutcliffe Adam Hague | 5.45 m | Not awarded | |
| Long jump | Dan Bramble | 7.90 m | Julian Reid | 7.87 m | Daniel Gardiner | 7.61 m |
| Triple jump | Tosin Oke (NGR) | 16.59 m | Nathan Fox | 16.25 m | Nonso Okolo | 15.60 m |
| Shot put | Zane Duquemin | 17.72 m | Scott Lincoln | 17.37 m | Youcef Zatat | 17.14 m |

=== Women ===
| Event | Gold | | Silver | | Bronze | |
|---|---|---|---|---|---|---|
| 60 metres | Dina Asher-Smith | 7.15 | Rachel Johncock | 7.33 | Diani Walker | 7.51 |
| 200 metres | Shannon Hylton | 23.69 | Cheriece Hylton | 23.80 | Joey Duck | 23.96 |
| 400 metres | Kirsten McAslan | 53.05 | Laura Maddox | 53.07 | Loren Bleaken | 55.37 |
| 800 metres | Jenny Meadows | 2:01.43 | Shelayna Oskan-Clarke | 2:02.91 | Katy Brown | 2:03.39 |
| 1500 metres | Laura Muir | 4:13.06 | Alison Leonard | 4:13.57 | Melissa Courtney | 4:17.90 |
| 3000 metres | Emelia Gorecka | 9:06.27 | Jessica Judd | 9:09.67 | Charlene Thomas | 9:11.67 |
| 60 metres hurdles | Serita Solomon | 8.04 | Lucy Hatton | 8.06 | Yasmin Miller | 8.18 |
| 3000 metres walk | Emma Achurch | 13:29.19 | Sophie Lewis Ward | 14:21.93 | Michelle Turner | 14:30.70 |
| High jump | Katarina Johnson-Thompson | 1.97 m | Morgan Lake | 1.94 m | Isobel Pooley | 1.88 m |
| Pole vault | Sally Peake | 4.25 m | Abigail Roberts | 4.00 m | Katie James | 4.00 m |
| Long jump | Abigail Irozuru | 6.73 m | Sarah Warnock | 6.37 m | Jazmin Sawyers | 6.32 m |
| Triple jump | Laura Samuel | 13.66 m | Zainab Ceesay | 13.12 m | Zara Asante | 13.00 m |
| Shot put | Eden Francis | 16.50 m | Shaunagh Brown | 15.55 m | Sophie McKinna | 15.15 m |
