= Diana Bazalar =

Peruvian hurdler

Personal information
- Full name: Diana Carolina Bazalar Alava
- Born: 13 March 1995 (age 31)
- Height: 1.65 m (5 ft 5 in)
- Weight: 62 kg (137 lb)

Sport
- Sport: Athletics
- Event: 100 m hurdles

Diana Carolina Bazalar Alava (born 13 March 1995) is a Peruvian athlete specialising in the sprint hurdles. She has won multiple medals on regional level.

Her personal bests are 13.25 seconds in the 100 metres hurdles (+0.5 m/s, Lima 2019) and 8.51 seconds in the 60 metres hurdles (Cochabamba 2020).

== International competitions ==
Year	Competition	Venue	Position	Event	Notes
Representing Peru
2011	World Youth Championships	Lille, France	29th (h)	100 m hurdles	14.85
2012	South American Youth Championships	Mendoza, Argentina	7th	200 m	25.62
2012	South American Youth Championships	Mendoza, Argentina	3rd	100 m hurdles	14.69
2012	South American Youth Championships	Mendoza, Argentina	4th	Medley relay	2:17.48
2013	South American Championships	Cartagena, Colombia	7th	100 m hurdles	14.31
2013	Pan American Junior Championships	Medellin, Colombia	7th	100 m hurdles	14.23
2013	South American Junior Championships	Resistencia, Argentina	1st	100 m hurdles	13.67 (w)
2013	South American Junior Championships	Resistencia, Argentina	6th	Medley relay	1:06.17
2013	Bolivarian Games	Trujillo, Peru	4th	100 m hurdles	13.78
2013	Bolivarian Games	Trujillo, Peru	5th	4 × 100 m relay	46.67
2014	Ibero-American Championships	São Paulo, Brazil	7th	100 m hurdles	13.90
2014	Ibero-American Championships	São Paulo, Brazil	–	4 × 100 m relay	DQ
2014	World Junior Championships	Eugene, United States	16th (sf)	100 m hurdles	13.63 (w)
2014	South American U23 Championships	Montevideo, Uruguay	4th	100 m hurdles	13.93 (w)
2014	South American U23 Championships	Montevideo, Uruguay	3rd	4 × 400 m relay	3:55.00
2015	South American Championships	Lima, Peru	5th	100 m hurdles	13.91
2015	South American Championships	Lima, Peru	5th	4 × 100 m relay	46.71
2016	Ibero-American Championships	Rio de Janeiro, Brazil	5th	100 m hurdles	13.60
2016	South American U23 Championships	Lima, Peru	5th	100 m	12.26
2016	South American U23 Championships	Lima, Peru	1st	100 m hurdles	13.52
2016	South American U23 Championships	Lima, Peru	4th	400 m hurdles	62.25
2016	South American U23 Championships	Lima, Peru	3rd	4 × 100 m relay	47.72
2017	South American Championships	Asunción, Paraguay	6th	100 m hurdles	13.61
2017	South American Championships	Asunción, Paraguay	6th	4 × 100 m relay	46.43
2017	Bolivarian Games	Santa Marta, Colombia	4th	100 m hurdles	13.53
2017	Bolivarian Games	Santa Marta, Colombia	4th	4 × 100 m relay	46.28
2018	South American Games	Cochabamba, Bolivia	2nd	100 m hurdles	13.36
2018	South American Games	Cochabamba, Bolivia	3rd	4 × 100 m relay	46.43
2018	Ibero-American Championships	Trujillo, Peru	4th	100 m hurdles	13.94
2018	Ibero-American Championships	Trujillo, Peru	1st	4 × 100 m relay	46.76
2019	South American Championships	Lima, Peru	5th	100 m hurdles	13.84
2019	South American Championships	Lima, Peru	5th	4 × 100 m relay	46.60
2019	Pan American Games	Lima, Peru	9th (h)	100 m hurdles	13.25
2019	Pan American Games	Lima, Peru	–	4 × 100 m relay	DNF
2020	South American Indoor Championships	Cochabamba, Bolivia	3rd	60 m hurdles	8.85
2021	South American Championships	Guayaquil, Ecuador	2nd	100 m hurdles	13.47
2022	South American Indoor Championships	Cochabamba, Bolivia	2nd	60 m hurdles	8.48
2022	Ibero-American Championships	La Nucía, Spain	5th	100 m hurdles	13.39
2022	Bolivarian Games	Valledupar, Colombia	3rd	100 m hurdles	13.62
2022	Bolivarian Games	Valledupar, Colombia	4th	4 × 100 m relay	48.60
2022	South American Games	Asunción, Paraguay	6th	100 m hurdles	15.44
