= 2014 World Junior Championships in Athletics – Women's 100 metres hurdles =

The women's 100 metres hurdles event at the 2014 World Junior Championships in Athletics was held in Eugene, Oregon, USA, at Hayward Field on 25, 26 and 27 July.

== Medalists ==
Gold	Kendell Williams; United States
Silver	Dior Hall; United States
Bronze	Nadine Visser; Netherlands

== Records ==
Standing records prior to the 2014 World Junior Championships in Athletics
World Junior Record	Aliuska López (CUB)	12.84	Zagreb, Yugoslavia	16 July 1987
Championship Record	Aliuska López (ESP)	12.96	Sudbury, Canada	29 July 1988
World Junior Leading	Kendell Williams (USA)	12.87	Eugene, United States	6 July 2014
Broken records during the 2014 World Junior Championships in Athletics

== Results ==
=== Final ===
27 July
Start time: 15:09 Temperature: 26 °C Humidity: 42 %
Wind: +1.9 m/s

Rank	Name	Nationality	Lane	Reaction Time	Time	Notes
1st place, gold medalist(s)	Kendell Williams	United States	3	0.184	12.89	CR
2nd place, silver medalist(s)	Dior Hall	United States	5	0.148	12.92	PB
3rd place, bronze medalist(s)	Nadine Visser	Netherlands	4	0.167	12.99	NJR
4	Yasmin Miller	United Kingdom	1	0.154	13.13	NJR
5	Génesis Romero	Venezuela	7	0.205	13.26	NJR
6	Sarah Missinne	Belgium	6	0.147	13.29	PB
7	Reetta Hurske	Finland	8	0.144	13.69	
	Elisa Girard-Mondoloni	France	2	0.161	DNF	

=== Semifinals ===
26 July
First 2 in each heat (Q) and the next 2 fastest (q) advance to the Final

==== Summary ====
Rank	Name	Nationality	Time	Notes
1	Kendell Williams	United States	12.98 w (w: +3.3 m/s)	Q
2	Nadine Visser	Netherlands	13.01 w (w: +3.1 m/s)	Q
3	Dior Hall	United States	13.09 w (w: +2.2 m/s)	Q
4	Sarah Missinne	Belgium	13.17 w (w: +3.1 m/s)	Q
5	Génesis Romero	Venezuela	13.26 w (w: +3.3 m/s)	Q
6	Yasmin Miller	United Kingdom	13.30 w (w: +2.2 m/s)	Q
6	Reetta Hurske	Finland	13.30 w (w: +3.1 m/s)	q
8	Elisa Girard-Mondoloni	France	13.35 w (w: +3.3 m/s)	q
9	Devynne Charlton	Bahamas	13.36 w (w: +3.1 m/s)	
10	Yanique Thompson	Jamaica	13.42 w (w: +2.2 m/s)	
11	Manca Šepetavc	Slovenia	13.48 w (w: +2.2 m/s)	
12	Anastasia Nikolaeva	Russia	13.51 w (w: +3.1 m/s)	
13	Nicole Setterington	Canada	13.55 w (w: +3.1 m/s)	
14	Daeshon Gordon	Jamaica	13.56 w (w: +3.3 m/s)	
15	Luca Kozák	Hungary	13.58 w (w: +3.3 m/s)	
16	Katrina Hunt	Australia	13.63 w (w: +2.2 m/s)	
16	Yuliia Bashmanova	Ukraine	13.63 w (w: +3.3 m/s)	
16	Diana Bazalar	Peru	13.63 w (w: +3.1 m/s)	
19	Tia Thevenin	Canada	13.68 w (w: +3.3 m/s)	
20	Iuliia Sokolova	Russia	13.71 w (w: +2.2 m/s)	
20	Héloise Kane	France	13.71 w (w: +2.2 m/s)	
22	Emma Koistinen	Finland	13.73 w (w: +3.3 m/s)	
23	Anne Sjoukje Runia	Netherlands	13.78 w (w: +2.2 m/s)	
24	Andrea Vargas	Costa Rica	14.11 w (w: +3.1 m/s)	

==== Details ====
First 2 in each heat (Q) and the next 2 fastest (q) advance to the Final

===== Semifinal 1 =====
27 July
Start time: 14:33 Temperature: 29 °C Humidity: 35 %
Wind: +2.2 m/s

Rank	Name	Nationality	Lane	Reaction Time	Time	Notes
1	Dior Hall	United States	6	0.156	13.09 w	Q
2	Yasmin Miller	United Kingdom	5	0.174	13.30 w	Q
3	Yanique Thompson	Jamaica	8	0.178	13.42 w	
4	Manca Šepetavc	Slovenia	4	0.196	13.48 w	
5	Katrina Hunt	Australia	3	0.128	13.63 w	
6	Iuliia Sokolova	Russia	7	0.182	13.71 w	
7	Héloise Kane	France	1	0.197	13.71 w	
8	Anne Sjoukje Runia	Netherlands	2	0.146	13.78 w	

===== Semifinal 2 =====
27 July
Start time: 14:40 Temperature: 29 °C Humidity: 35 %
Wind: +3.3 m/s

Rank	Name	Nationality	Lane	Reaction Time	Time	Notes
1	Kendell Williams	United States	4	0.180	12.98 w	Q
2	Génesis Romero	Venezuela	3	0.217	13.26 w	Q
3	Elisa Girard-Mondoloni	France	6	0.169	13.35 w	q
4	Daeshon Gordon	Jamaica	1	0.151	13.56 w	
5	Luca Kozák	Hungary	7	0.170	13.58 w	
6	Yuliia Bashmanova	Ukraine	8	0.170	13.63 w	
7	Tia Thevenin	Canada	5	0.136	13.68 w	
8	Emma Koistinen	Finland	2	0.194	13.73 w	

===== Semifinal 3 =====
27 July
Start time: 14:47 Temperature: 29 °C Humidity: 35 %
Wind: +3.1 m/s

Rank	Name	Nationality	Lane	Reaction Time	Time	Notes
1	Nadine Visser	Netherlands	5	0.176	13.01 w	Q
2	Sarah Missinne	Belgium	4	0.144	13.17 w	Q
3	Reetta Hurske	Finland	3	0.148	13.30 w	q
4	Devynne Charlton	Bahamas	6	0.164	13.36 w	
5	Anastasia Nikolaeva	Russia	7	0.198	13.51 w	
6	Nicole Setterington	Canada	8	0.204	13.55 w	
7	Diana Bazalar	Peru	1	0.183	13.63 w	
8	Andrea Vargas	Costa Rica	2	0.198	14.11 w	

=== Heats ===
25 July
First 4 in each heat (Q) and the next 4 fastest (q) advance to the Semi-Finals

==== Summary ====
Rank	Name	Nationality	Time	Notes
1	Kendell Williams	United States	13.00 (w: +1.6 m/s)	Q
2	Nadine Visser	Netherlands	13.27 w (w: +2.7 m/s)	Q
3	Dior Hall	United States	13.29 (w: +1.7 m/s)	Q
4	Yasmin Miller	United Kingdom	13.37 (w: +1.7 m/s)	Q
5	Sarah Missinne	Belgium	13.38 (w: +1.5 m/s)	Q PB
6	Elisa Girard-Mondoloni	France	13.42 (w: +1.7 m/s)	Q PB
7	Reetta Hurske	Finland	13.43 (w: +1.7 m/s)	Q PB
8	Devynne Charlton	Bahamas	13.56 (w: +1.7 m/s)	Q PB
8	Génesis Romero	Venezuela	13.56 w (w: +2.7 m/s)	Q
10	Manca Šepetavc	Slovenia	13.63 (w: +1.5 m/s)	Q
10	Tia Thevenin	Canada	13.63 (w: +1.7 m/s)	Q PB
12	Nicole Setterington	Canada	13.64 (w: +1.5 m/s)	Q
13	Katrina Hunt	Australia	13.66 (w: +1.6 m/s)	Q PB
14	Anastasia Nikolaeva	Russia	13.68 (w: +1.7 m/s)	Q
15	Yuliia Bashmanova	Ukraine	13.69 (w: +1.6 m/s)	Q PB
16	Yanique Thompson	Jamaica	13.70 (w: +1.6 m/s)	Q
17	Luca Kozák	Hungary	13.72 (w: +1.5 m/s)	Q PB
18	Daeshon Gordon	Jamaica	13.76 (w: +1.7 m/s)	Q
19	Héloise Kane	France	13.78 (w: +1.6 m/s)	q
20	Anne Sjoukje Runia	Netherlands	13.79 (w: +1.5 m/s)	q
21	Iuliia Sokolova	Russia	13.80 w (w: +2.7 m/s)	Q
22	Emma Koistinen	Finland	13.88 (w: +1.7 m/s)	q
23	Andrea Vargas	Costa Rica	13.89 w (w: +2.7 m/s)	Q
24	Diana Bazalar	Peru	13.90 w (w: +2.7 m/s)	q
25	Adriana Janic	Sweden	14.01 (w: +1.7 m/s)	
26	Irina Strebel	Switzerland	14.02 (w: +1.7 m/s)	
27	Majella Hauri	Switzerland	14.06 (w: +1.6 m/s)	
28	Valeria Aguilar	Mexico	14.08 (w: +1.7 m/s)	
29	Akila McShine	Trinidad and Tobago	14.11 (w: +1.7 m/s)	
30	Mari Forbord Anderssen	Norway	14.14 w (w: +2.7 m/s)	
31	Elise Malmberg	Sweden	14.19 (w: +1.5 m/s)	
32	Natalia Christofi	Cyprus	14.27 (w: +1.5 m/s)	
33	Linha Ahmed	Egypt	14.29 (w: +1.5 m/s)	
34	Sidsel Bjørgo Adam	Norway	14.40 (w: +1.6 m/s)	
35	Jannah Wong Min	Singapore	14.62 (w: +1.7 m/s)	
36	Viktoria Tencheva	Bulgaria	14.83 (w: +1.7 m/s)	
37	Petra Répási	Hungary	19.20 w (w: +2.7 m/s)	
	Oluwatobiloba Amusan	Nigeria	DNS	

==== Details ====
First 4 in each heat (Q) and the next 4 fastest (q) advance to the Semi-Finals

===== Heat 1 =====
27 July
Start time: 10:58 Temperature: 18 °C Humidity: 64 %
Wind: +1.6 m/s

Rank	Name	Nationality	Lane	Reaction Time	Time	Notes
1	Kendell Williams	United States	2	0.173	13.00	Q
2	Katrina Hunt	Australia	8	0.120	13.66	Q PB
3	Yuliia Bashmanova	Ukraine	4	0.214	13.69	Q PB
4	Yanique Thompson	Jamaica	5	0.169	13.70	Q
5	Héloise Kane	France	7	0.173	13.78	q
6	Majella Hauri	Switzerland	3	0.161	14.06	
7	Sidsel Bjørgo Adam	Norway	6	0.157	14.40	

===== Heat 2 =====
27 July
Start time: 11:06 Temperature: 18 °C Humidity: 64 %
Wind: +2.7 m/s

Rank	Name	Nationality	Lane	Reaction Time	Time	Notes
1	Nadine Visser	Netherlands	1	0.203	13.27 w	Q
2	Génesis Romero	Venezuela	2	0.201	13.56 w	Q
3	Iuliia Sokolova	Russia	4	0.199	13.80 w	Q
4	Andrea Vargas	Costa Rica	8	0.224	13.89 w	Q
5	Diana Bazalar	Peru	7	0.217	13.90 w	q
6	Mari Forbord Anderssen	Norway	6	0.202	14.14 w	
7	Petra Répási	Hungary	5	0.197	19.20 w	
	Oluwatobiloba Amusan	Nigeria	3		DNS	

Note:
BIB 1314 Iuliia Sokolova - Yellow Card - 162.5(b) Delaying the start

===== Heat 3 =====
27 July
Start time: 11:13 Temperature: 21 °C Humidity: 53 %
Wind: +1.7 m/s

Rank	Name	Nationality	Lane	Reaction Time	Time	Notes
1	Yasmin Miller	United Kingdom	4	0.172	13.37	Q
2	Elisa Girard-Mondoloni	France	1	0.160	13.42	Q PB
3	Reetta Hurske	Finland	7	0.147	13.43	Q PB
4	Daeshon Gordon	Jamaica	2	0.163	13.76	Q
5	Adriana Janic	Sweden	6	0.143	14.01	
6	Irina Strebel	Switzerland	5	0.189	14.02	
7	Jannah Wong Min	Singapore	3	0.139	14.62	
8	Viktoria Tencheva	Bulgaria	8	0.184	14.83	

===== Heat 4 =====
27 July
Start time: 11:20 Temperature: 21 °C Humidity: 53 %
Wind: +1.5 m/s

Rank	Name	Nationality	Lane	Reaction Time	Time	Notes
1	Sarah Missinne	Belgium	5	0.148	13.38	Q PB
2	Manca Šepetavc	Slovenia	2	0.167	13.63	Q
3	Nicole Setterington	Canada	8	0.179	13.64	Q
4	Luca Kozák	Hungary	7	0.305	13.72	Q PB
5	Anne Sjoukje Runia	Netherlands	3	0.193	13.79	q
6	Elise Malmberg	Sweden	6	0.198	14.19	
7	Natalia Christofi	Cyprus	4	0.184	14.27	
8	Linha Ahmed	Egypt	1	0.196	14.29	

===== Heat 5 =====
27 July
Start time: 11:26 Temperature: 21 °C Humidity: 53 %
Wind: +1.7 m/s

Rank	Name	Nationality	Lane	Reaction Time	Time	Notes
1	Dior Hall	United States	6	0.142	13.29	Q
2	Devynne Charlton	Bahamas	8	0.207	13.56	Q PB
3	Tia Thevenin	Canada	7	0.132	13.63	Q PB
4	Anastasia Nikolaeva	Russia	5	0.162	13.68	Q
5	Emma Koistinen	Finland	2	0.184	13.88	q
6	Valeria Aguilar	Mexico	4	0.159	14.08	
7	Akila McShine	Trinidad and Tobago	3	0.157	14.11	

== Participation ==
According to an unofficial count, 37 athletes from 26 countries participated in the event.

- Australia (1)
- Bahamas (1)
- Belgium (1)
- Bulgaria (1)
- Canada (2)
- Costa Rica (1)
- Cyprus (1)
- Egypt (1)
- Finland (2)
- France (2)
- Hungary (2)
- Jamaica (2)
- Mexico (1)
- Netherlands (2)
- Norway (2)
- Peru (1)
- Russia (2)
- Singapore (1)
- Slovenia (1)
- Sweden (2)
- Switzerland (2)
- Trinidad and Tobago (1)
- Ukraine (1)
- United Kingdom (1)
- United States (2)
- Venezuela (1)
