= 2013 British Indoor Athletics Championships =

- Dates: 9–10 February
- Host city: Sheffield
- Venue: EIS Sheffield
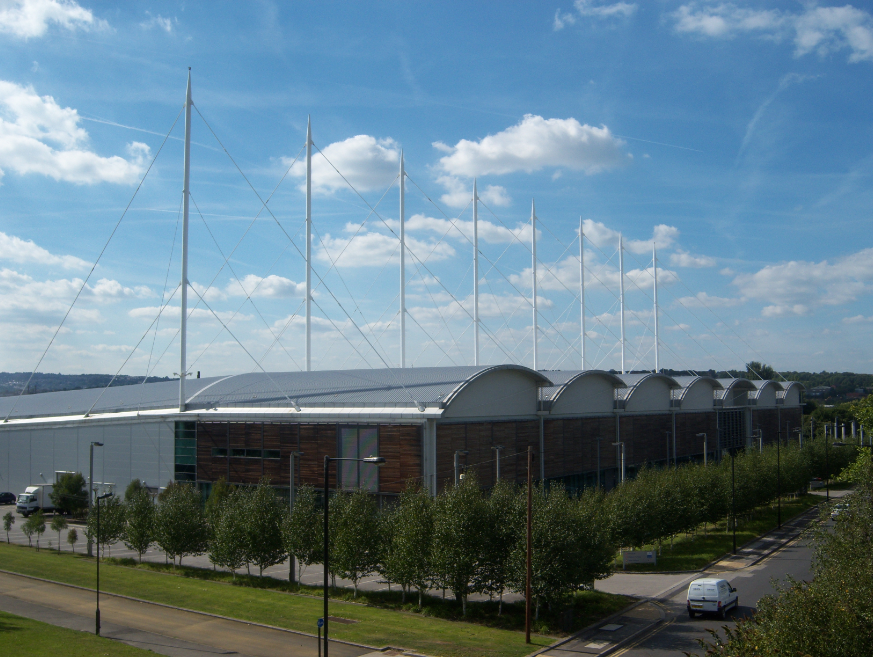
- Level: Senior national
- Type: Indoor
- Events: 24

The 2013 British Indoor Athletics Championships was the 7th edition of the national championship in indoor track and field for the United Kingdom. It was held from 9–10 February 2013 at the English Institute of Sport, Sheffield, England. A total of 24 events (divided evenly between the sexes) were contested over the two-day competition. It served as the selection meet for Great Britain at the 2013 European Athletics Indoor Championships.

== Results ==
=== Men ===
Event	Gold		Silver		Bronze	
60 metres	James Dasaolu	6.58	Harry Aikines-Aryeetey	6.69	Sean Safo-Antwi	6.69
200 metres	Chris Clarke	20.96	Andre Wright	21.29	David Gain	21.62
400 metres	Nigel Levine	46.73	Richard Strachan	46.95	Michael Bingham	47.04
800 metres	Joe Thomas	1:48.55	Mukhtar Mohammed	1:48.55	Guy Learmonth	1:49.35
1500 metres	Matthew Fayers	3:47.77	Lee Emanuel	3:48.28	Charlie Grice	3:48.34
3000 metres	David Bishop	8:06.98	Tom Humphries	8:07.11	Philip Hurst	8:07.28
60 m hurdles	Gianni Frankis	7.73	Allan Scott	7.76	Nick Gayle	7.79
High jump	Robbie Grabarz	2.31 m	Marco Fassinotti (ITA)	2.22 m	Allan Smith	2.22 m
Pole vault	Steven Lewis	5.50 m	Luke Cutts	5.35 m	Matt Devereux Max Eaves	5.20 m
Long jump	Matthew Burton	7.94 m	Chris Tomlinson	7.88 m	Dan Bramble	7.80 m
Triple jump	Tosin Oke (NGR)	16.87 m	Kola Adedoyin	16.50 m	Michael Puplampu	16.43 m
Shot put	Scott Rider	18.59 m	Zane Duquemin	18.50 m	Rimantas Martišauskas (LTU)	18.36 m

=== Women ===
Event	Gold		Silver		Bronze	
60 metres	Asha Philip	7.15	Annabelle Lewis	7.33	Anyika Onuora	7.37
200 metres	Margaret Adeoye	23.22	Christine Ohuruogu	23.58	Louise Bloor	23.95
400 metres	Eilidh Child	52.13	Shana Cox	52.97	Meghan Beesley	53.15
800 metres	Claire Tarplee (IRL)	2:03.66	Alison Leonard	2:03.88	Dawn Hunt	2:05.39
1500 metres	Laura Muir	4:13.59	Rosie Clarke	4:17.09	Melissa Courtney	4:17.57
3000 metres	Lauren Howarth	8:56.48	Emily Stewart	9:08.47	Jessica Judd	9:14.71
60 m hurdles	Derval O'Rourke (IRL)	8.11	Sarah Claxton	8.16	Yasmin Miller	8.25
High jump	Emma Perkins	1.81 m	Morgan Lake	1.81 m	Jayne Nisbet	1.78 m
Pole vault	Holly Bleasdale	4.77 m	Katie Byres	4.20 m	Zoë Brown (IRL) Lucy Bryan	4.20 m
Long jump	Dominique Blaize	6.29 m	Jade Surman	6.19 m	Sarah Warnock	6.16 m
Triple jump	Yamilé Aldama	13.44 m	Sinead Gutzmore	13.29 m	Angela Barrett	13.04 m
Shot put	Rachel Wallader	16.19 m	Shaunagh Brown	16.07 m	Sophie McKinna	15.76 m
