= 2015 IAAF World Relays – Women's 4 × 100 metres relay =

Women's 4 × 100 metres relay at the 2014 IAAF World Relays
- Venue: Thomas Robinson Stadium
- Dates: 3 May (heats & final)
- Nations: 22
- Winning time: 42.14

Medalists
gold medal	Simone Facey; Kerron Stewart; Schillonie Calvert; Veronica Campbell-Brown; Jamaica
silver medal	Tianna Bartoletta; Allyson Felix; Kimberlyn Duncan; Carmelita Jeter; United States
bronze medal	Asha Philip; Ashleigh Nelson; Bianca Williams; Margaret Adeoye; Great Britain

The women's 4 × 100 metres relay at the 2015 IAAF World Relays was held at the Thomas Robinson Stadium on 2 May.

== Records ==
Prior to the competition, the records were as follows:

World record	United States (Tianna Madison, Allyson Felix, Bianca Knight, Carmelita Jeter)	40.82	(United Kingdom) London, Great Britain	10 August 2012
Championship record	United States (Tianna Bartoletta, Alexandria Anderson, Jeneba Tarmoh, LaKeisha Lawson)	41.88	(The Bahamas) Nassau, Bahamas	24 May 2014
World Leading	HS International	42.98	Los Angeles, United States	11 April 2015
African Record	Nigeria (Beatrice Utondu, Faith Idehen, Christy Opara, Mary Onyali)	42.39	Barcelona, Spain	7 August 1992
Asian Record	China (Xiao Lin, Li Yali, Liu Xiaomei, Li Xuemei)	42.23	Shanghai, China	23 October 1997
North, Central American and Caribbean record	United States (Tianna Madison, Allyson Felix, Bianca Knight, Carmelita Jeter)	40.82	(United Kingdom) London, Great Britain	10 August 2012
South American Record	Brazil (Evelyn dos Santos, Ana Claudia Silva, Franciela Krasucki, Rosângela Santos)	42.29	Moscow, Russia	18 August 2013
European Record	East Germany (Silke Gladisch-Möller, Sabine Rieger-Günther, Ingrid Auerswald-Lange, Marlies Göhr)	41.37	Canberra, Australia	6 October 1985
Oceanian record	Australia (Rachael Massey, Suzanne Broadrick, Jodi Lambert, Melinda Gainsford-Taylor)	42.99	Pietersburg, South Africa	18 March 2000

== Schedule ==
Date	Time	Round
3 May 2014	19:29	Heats
3 May 2014	21:36	Final B
3 May 2014	21:45	Final

All times are local times (UTC-4)

== Results ==
KEY:	q	Fastest non-qualifiers	Q	Qualified	WL	World leading	SB	Seasonal best

=== Heats ===
Qualification: First 2 of each heat (Q) plus the 2 fastest times (q) advanced to the final.

Rank	Heat	Lane	Nation	Athletes	Time	Notes
1	1	5	Jamaica	Simone Facey, Kerron Stewart, Schillonie Calvert, Natasha Morrison	42.50	Q, WL
2	2	4	United States	Tianna Bartoletta, Allyson Felix, Kimberlyn Duncan, Carmelita Jeter	42.63	Q, SB
3	2	8	Trinidad and Tobago	Kamaria Durant, Michelle-Lee Ahye, Reyare Thomas, Kai Selvon	42.87	Q, SB
4	3	7	Brazil	Vanusa dos Santos, Ana Cláudia Silva, Franciela Krasucki, Rosângela Santos	42.94	Q, SB
4	1	6	Canada	Crystal Emmanuel, Kimberly Hyacinthe, Shai-Anne Davis, Khamica Bingham	42.94	Q, NR
6	1	3	Nigeria	Gloria Asumnu, Blessing Okagbare, Dominique Duncan, Peace Uko	43.56	q, SB
7	3	3	Great Britain	Asha Philip, Ashleigh Nelson, Bianca Williams, Margaret Adeoye	43.60	Q, SB
8	3	2	Switzerland	Mujinga Kambundji, Léa Sprunger, Marisa Lavanchy, Fanette Humair	43.68	q, SB
9	1	8	Bahamas	V'Alonée Robinson, Tayla Carter, Brianne Bethel, Debbie Ferguson-McKenzie	44.11	SB
10	3	8	Ecuador	Yuliana Angulo, Narcisa Landazuri, Viviana de la Cruz, Ángela Tenorio	44.24	SB
11	3	6	Kazakhstan	Svetlana Ivanchukova, Viktoriya Zyabkina, Anastasiya Tulapina, Olga Safronova	44.27	SB
12	2	5	Puerto Rico	Beatriz Cruz, Genoiska Cancel, Dayleen Santana, Carol Rodríguez	44.35	SB
13	2	7	Venezuela	Wilmary Álvarez, Andrea Purica, Nediam Vargas, Nercely Soto	44.42	SB
14	2	2	China	Yuan Qiqi, Kong Lingwei, Lin Huijun, Tao Yujia	44.45	SB
15	2	6	Sweden	Pernilla Nilsson, Isabelle Eurenius, Daniella Busk, Moa Hjelmer	44.81	SB
16	3	4	Australia	Samantha Geddes, Eloise Graf, Hayley Butler, Abbie Tadeo	45.17	
17	1	4	Ireland	Amy Foster, Stephanie Creaner, Catherine McManus, Phil Healy	45.38	SB
	3	5	France	Céline Distel-Bonnet, Stella Akakpo, Jennifer Galais, Ayodelé Ikuesan	DNF	
	1	7	Germany	Yasmin Kwadwo, Inna Weit, Tatjana Pinto, Verena Sailer	DNF	
	2	3	Italy	Giulia Riva, Gloria Hooper, Irene Siragusa, Audrey Alloh	DNF	
	1	2	Poland	Marika Popowicz, Anna Kiełbasińska, Marta Jeschke, Karolina Zagajewska	DNF	
	3	1	Japan	Mayumi Watanabe, Anna Doi, Chisato Fukushima, Kana Ichikawa	DQ	170.7

=== Final B ===
The final B was started at 21:47.

Rank	Lane	Nation	Athletes	Time	Notes
1	6	Ecuador	Yuliana Angulo, Narcisa Landazuri, Viviana de la Cruz, Ángela Tenorio	44.14	SB
2	5	Bahamas	V'Alonée Robinson, Tayla Carter, Brianne Bethel, Debbie Ferguson-McKenzie	44.14	
3	8	Venezuela	Wilmary Álvarez, Andrea Purica, Nediam Vargas, Nercely Soto	44.17	SB
4	7	China	Yuan Qiqi, Kong Lingwei, Lin Huijun, Tao Yujia	44.28	SB
5	4	Puerto Rico	Beatriz Cruz, Genoiska Cancel, Dayleen Santana, Carol Rodríguez	44.56	
6	3	Kazakhstan	Svetlana Ivanchukova, Viktoriya Zyabkina, Anastasiya Tulapina, Olga Safronova	44.89	
7	1	Sweden	Pernilla Nilsson, Isabelle Eurenius, Daniella Busk, Moa Hjelmer	44.97	
8	2	Australia	Brianna Beahan, Eloise Graf, Hayley Butler, Abbie Tadeo	45.70	

=== Final ===
The final was started at 21:57.

Rank	Lane	Nation	Athletes	Time	Notes
1st place, gold medalist(s)	6	Jamaica	Simone Facey, Kerron Stewart, Schillonie Calvert, Veronica Campbell-Brown	42.14	WL
2nd place, silver medalist(s)	3	United States	Tianna Bartoletta, Allyson Felix, Kimberlyn Duncan, Carmelita Jeter	42.32	SB
3rd place, bronze medalist(s)	7	Great Britain	Asha Philip, Ashleigh Nelson, Bianca Williams, Margaret Adeoye	42.84	SB
4	8	Canada	Crystal Emmanuel, Kimberly Hyacinthe, Shai-Anne Davis, Khamica Bingham	42.85	NR
5	4	Trinidad and Tobago	Kamaria Durant, Michelle-Lee Ahye, Reyare Thomas, Kai Selvon	42.88	
6	5	Brazil	Vanusa dos Santos, Ana Cláudia Silva, Franciela Krasucki, Rosângela Santos	42.92	SB
7	1	Nigeria	Gloria Asumnu, Blessing Okagbare, Dominique Duncan, Peace Uko	42.99	SB
8	2	Switzerland	Mujinga Kambundji, Léa Sprunger, Marisa Lavanchy, Fanette Humair	43.74	
