= 2014 South American Under-23 Championships in Athletics – Results =

These are the full results of the 2014 South American Under-23 Championships in Athletics which took place between October 3 and October 5, 2014, at Pista de Atletismo Darwin Piñeyrúa in Montevideo, Uruguay.

== Men's results ==
=== 100 meters ===
Heat 1 – 3 October 10:00h - Wind: 1.6 m/s

Rank	Name	Nationality	Time	Notes
1	Aldemir da Silva Junior	Brazil	10.76	Q
2	Bruno Rojas	Bolivia	10.82	q
3	Anderson Quintero	Ecuador	11.01	
4	Frank Sánchez	Peru	11.02	
5	Jorge Caracasis	Argentina	11.17	

Heat 2 – 3 October 10:00h - Wind: 0.9 m/s

Rank	Name	Nationality	Time	Notes
1	Andy Martínez	Peru	10.51	Q
2	José Mosquera	Ecuador	10.73	q
3	Alexis Nieves	Venezuela	10.80	q
4	Sergio Aldea	Chile	11.06	
5	Jesús Cáceres	Paraguay	11.15	
6	Rodrigo Fleitas	Uruguay	11.26	

Heat 3 – 3 October 10:00h - Wind: 0.6 m/s

Rank	Name	Nationality	Time	Notes
1	Ricardo de Souza	Brazil	10.61	Q
2	Ángel Ayala	Paraguay	10.71	q
3	Danny Vanan	Suriname	11.06	
4	Martín Mello	Uruguay	11.27	

Heat 4 – 3 October 10:00h - Wind: 1.0 m/s

Rank	Name	Nationality	Time	Notes
1	Enrique Polanco	Chile	10.77	Q
2	Sebastián Acevedo	Argentina	10.97	

Final – 3 October 17:10h - Wind: 0.3 m/s

Rank	Name	Nationality	Time	Notes
1st place, gold medalist(s)	Andy Martínez	Peru	10.40	
2nd place, silver medalist(s)	Aldemir da Silva Junior	Brazil	10.47	
3rd place, bronze medalist(s)	Enrique Polanco	Chile	10.53	
4	Ricardo de Souza	Brazil	10.64	
5	Ángel Ayala	Paraguay	10.80	
6	José Mosquera	Ecuador	10.81	
7	Bruno Rojas	Bolivia	10.96	
8	Alexis Nieves	Venezuela	11.00	

=== 200 meters ===
Heat 1 – 5 October 9:30h - Wind: 1.6 m/s

Rank	Name	Nationality	Time	Notes
1	Aldemir da Silva Junior	Brazil	20.98	Q
2	Fredy Maidana	Paraguay	21.11	Q
3	Bruno Rojas	Bolivia	21.62	Q
4	José Mosquera	Ecuador	21.93	q
5	Frank Sánchez	Peru	22.21	
6	Leonardo Ariel Díaz	Argentina	22.27	
7	Jhony Rodríguez	Uruguay	23.13	
	Enrique Polanco	Chile	DNF	

Heat 2 – 5 October 9:30h - Wind: -0.2 m/s

Rank	Name	Nationality	Time	Notes
1	Antonio Cesar Rodrigues	Brazil	21.36	Q
2	Diego Palomeque	Colombia	21.69	Q
3	Ángel Ayala	Paraguay	21.77	Q
4	Sergio Germaín	Chile	22.06	q
5	Emanuel Alessandrini	Argentina	22.24	
6	Martín Mello	Uruguay	22.64	
	Anderson Quintero	Ecuador	DNF	
	Danny Vanan	Suriname	DQ	

Final – 5 October 15:20h - Wind: 1.4 m/s

Rank	Name	Nationality	Time	Notes
1st place, gold medalist(s)	Aldemir da Silva Junior	Brazil	20.50	CR
2nd place, silver medalist(s)	Fredy Maidana	Paraguay	20.90	NR
3rd place, bronze medalist(s)	Diego Palomeque	Colombia	21.02	
4	Antonio Cesar Rodrigues	Brazil	21.09	
5	Bruno Rojas	Bolivia	21.56	
6	Sergio Germaín	Chile	21.67	
7	Ángel Ayala	Paraguay	21.73	
8	José Mosquera	Ecuador	22.20	

=== 400 meters ===
Heat 1 – 3 October 10:55h

Rank	Name	Nationality	Time	Notes
1	José Meléndez	Venezuela	48.06	Q
2	Bernardo Baloyes	Colombia	48.65	Q
3	Lucas Santos	Brazil	49.49	Q
4	Luis Saavedra	Peru	49.99	q
5	Kevin Lecitra	Argentina	50.63	
6	Ramón Silva	Paraguay	51.29	
7	Ignácio Piquerez	Uruguay	51.93	

Heat 2 – 3 October 10:55h

Rank	Name	Nationality	Time	Notes
1	Alexander Russo	Brazil	48.67	Q
2	Sergio Germaín	Chile	49.25	Q
3	Matías Kraglievich	Argentina	49.36	Q
4	Jairo Pérez	Uruguay	49.71	q
5	Jorge Mena	Panama	51.32	
	Jhon Perlaza	Colombia	DNS	

Final – 3 October 18:00h

Rank	Name	Nationality	Time	Notes
1st place, gold medalist(s)	José Meléndez	Venezuela	46.07	
2nd place, silver medalist(s)	Bernardo Baloyes	Colombia	46.11	
3rd place, bronze medalist(s)	Alexander Russo	Brazil	46.35	
4	Lucas Santos	Brazil	47.43	
5	Sergio Germaín	Chile	47.79	
6	Luis Saavedra	Peru	49.40	
7	Matías Kraglievich	Argentina	49.41	
8	Jairo Pérez	Uruguay	49.69	

=== 800 meters ===
Heat 1 – 4 October 10:40h

Rank	Name	Nationality	Time	Notes
1	Lucirio Antonio Garrido	Venezuela	1:51.20	Q
2	Miguel Ángel Alvarado	Colombia	1:51.51	Q
3	Alejandro Peirano	Chile	1:52.30	Q
4	Willian García	Peru	1:52.92	q
5	Edmundo Díaz	Peru	1:55.53	
6	Giovanni Villalba	Paraguay	1:56.11	
7	Clifton Betje	Suriname	1:57.58	

Heat 2 – 4 October 10:40h

Rank	Name	Nationality	Time	Notes
1	Kevin Angulo	Ecuador	1:53.81	Q 809
2	Lucas Gabriel Rodrigues	Brazil	1:53.81	Q 810
3	Joseilton Cunha	Brazil	1:54.01	Q
4	Leandro Paris	Argentina	1:54.10	q
5	Mateo Rossetto	Argentina	1:55.13	
6	Jairo Pérez	Uruguay	1:55.52	

Final – 4 October 17:20h

Rank	Name	Nationality	Time	Notes
1st place, gold medalist(s)	Joseilton Cunha	Brazil	1:48.47	
2nd place, silver medalist(s)	Lucas Gabriel Rodrigues	Brazil	1:49.37	
3rd place, bronze medalist(s)	Lucirio Antonio Garrido	Venezuela	1:50.87	
4	Miguel Ángel Alvarado	Colombia	1:51.37	
5	Kevin Angulo	Ecuador	1:51.72	
6	Leandro Paris	Argentina	1:52.23	
7	Willian García	Peru	1:54.41	
8	Alejandro Peirano	Chile	1:55.55	

=== 1500 meters ===
Final – 5 October 16:20h

Rank	Name	Nationality	Time	Notes
1st place, gold medalist(s)	Carlos Díaz	Chile	3:44.52	CR
2nd place, silver medalist(s)	Javier Marmo	Uruguay	3:47.47	
3rd place, bronze medalist(s)	Kevin Angulo	Ecuador	3:47.82	
4	Leonel Cesar	Argentina	3:48.04	
5	Weverton Fidélis	Brazil	3:48.76	
6	Lucirio Antonio Garrido	Venezuela	3:51.17	
7	Jesús Yana	Peru	3:51.92	
8	Rodrigo Silva	Brazil	3:56.91	
9	Walter Nina	Peru	3:57.23	
10	Rubén Toroya	Bolivia	4:03.32	
11	Leonardo Coito	Uruguay	4:05.37	
12	Giovanni Villalba	Paraguay	4:10.24	
	Roberto Tello	Chile	DNF	

=== 5000 meters ===
Final – 3 October 15:50h

Rank	Name	Nationality	Time	Notes
1st place, gold medalist(s)	Matías Silva	Chile	13:57.58	CR
2nd place, silver medalist(s)	José Luis Rojas	Peru	14:02.37	
3rd place, bronze medalist(s)	Yerson Orellana	Peru	14:04.30	
4	Gustavo Frencia	Argentina	14:18.10	
5	Daniel Toroya	Bolivia	14:31.13	
6	Daniel do Nascimento	Brazil	14:37.82	
7	Ariel Méndez	Chile	14:42.63	
8	Victor Vinicius da Silva	Brazil	14:52.20	

=== 10,000 meters ===
Final – 4 October 15:50h

Rank	Name	Nationality	Time	Notes
1st place, gold medalist(s)	Matías Silva	Chile	30:13.81	
2nd place, silver medalist(s)	Daniel Toroya	Bolivia	30:16.50	
3rd place, bronze medalist(s)	Ariel Méndez	Chile	30:19.61	
4	José Luis Ostos	Peru	30:30.39	
5	Rener Lopes	Brazil	30:35.34	
6	Ronald da Silva	Brazil	30:54.43	
7	Gaspar Geymonat	Uruguay	30:54.86	
8	Christian Pacheco	Peru	32:20.71	
9	Marcelo Fabricius	Argentina	32:33.37	
10	Cristián Segovia	Uruguay	32:44.69	
	Nicolas Alejandro Herrera	Colombia	DQ	

=== 110 meters hurdles ===
Final – 4 October 15:30h - Wind: 2.2 m/s

Rank	Name	Nationality	Time	Notes
1st place, gold medalist(s)	Jonathas Brito	Brazil	13.69 w	
2nd place, silver medalist(s)	Eduardo de Deus	Brazil	13.85 w	
3rd place, bronze medalist(s)	Diego Lyon	Chile	13.98 w	
4	Luis Escobar	Ecuador	14.42 w	
5	Patricio Colarte	Chile	14.49 w	
6	Mauricio Pereira	Paraguay	14.62 w	
7	Williams Ríos	Panama	14.72 w	
8	Juan José Piloni	Argentina	15.14 w	

=== 400 meters hurdles ===
Final – 5 October 16:50h

Rank	Name	Nationality	Time	Notes
1st place, gold medalist(s)	Wesley Martins	Brazil	51.12	
2nd place, silver medalist(s)	Yeferson Valencia	Colombia	51.19	
3rd place, bronze medalist(s)	Alfredo Sepúlveda	Chile	51.56	
4	Kaynan Hack	Brazil	51.62	
5	Luis Escobar	Ecuador	52.35	
6	Sergio Bautista	Uruguay	56.22	
7	Jaime Rodríguez	Argentina	56.93	
8	Mauricio dos Santos	Uruguay	57.81	

=== 3000 meters steeplechase ===
Final – 4 October 11:30h

Rank	Name	Nationality	Time	Notes
1st place, gold medalist(s)	Roberto Tello	Chile	8:57.49	
2nd place, silver medalist(s)	Thiarles dos Santos	Brazil	9:02.16	
3rd place, bronze medalist(s)	Juan Medina	Chile	9:08.59	586
4	Alex de Oliveira	Brazil	9:08.59	590
5	Yuber Echeverri	Colombia	9:14.13	
6	Jesús Yana	Peru	9:14.42	
7	Gustavo Frencia	Argentina	9:29.13	
8	Walter Nina	Peru	9:30.16	
9	Rubén Toroya	Bolivia	9:41.67	
10	Mauricio Castillo	Uruguay	10:11.50	
11	Steven Cassina	Uruguay	10:36.74	

=== 4x100 meters relay ===
Final – 4 October 18:40h

Rank	Nation	Competitors	Time	Notes
1st place, gold medalist(s)	Brazil	Rodrigo do Nascimento; Ricardo de Souza; Antonio Cesar Rodrigues; Aldemir da Silva Junior	39.74	
2nd place, silver medalist(s)	Paraguay	Cristián Leguizamon; Fredy Maidana; Jesús Cáceres; Ángel Ayala	40.88	NR
3rd place, bronze medalist(s)	Chile	Patricio Colarte; Sergio Aldea; Sergio Germaín; Enrique Polanco	41.20	
4	Ecuador	José Pacho; José Mosquera; Luis Escobar; Anderson Quintero	41.81	
5	Argentina	Jorge Caracasis; Leonardo Ariel Díaz; Sebastián Acevedo; Kevin Lecitra	41.87	
6	Venezuela	José Gregorio Milanesse; José Meléndez; Santiago Cova; Óscar Campos	41.95	
7	Uruguay	Mateo Pascual; Rodrigo Fleitas; Martín Mello; Jhony Rodríguez	43.05	
	Colombia	Diego Palomeque; Miguel Ángel Alvarado; Yeferson Valencia; Bernardo Baloyes	DNS	

=== 4x400 meters relay ===
Final – 5 October 18:10h

Rank	Nation	Competitors	Time	Notes
1st place, gold medalist(s)	Brazil	Anderson Machado Ddos Santos; Lucas Santos; Carlos Grachet; Alexander Russo	3:08.95	
2nd place, silver medalist(s)	Chile	Alfredo Sepúlveda; Sergio Germaín; Alejandro Peirano; Sergio Aldea	3:11.93	
3rd place, bronze medalist(s)	Colombia	Diego Palomeque; Miguel Ángel Alvarado; Yeferson Valencia; Bernardo Baloyes	3:11.95	
4	Peru	Luis Saavedra; Willian García; Andy Martínez; Edmundo Díaz	3:15.72	
5	Argentina	Leonardo Ariel Díaz; Leandro Paris; Matías Kraglievich; Mateo Rossetto	3:17.19	
6	Uruguay	Jerson de Los Santos; Jairo Pérez; Jonathan de Souza; Ignácio Piquerez	3:19.92	
7	Paraguay	Fredy Maidana; Jesús Cáceres; Giovanni Villalba; Ramón Silva	3:26.24	
	Ecuador	José Mosquera; José Pacho; Anderson Quintero; Luis Escobar	DNS	

=== 20,000 meters walk ===
Final – 4 October 11:55h

Rank	Name	Nationality	Time	Notes
1st place, gold medalist(s)	Manuel Esteban Soto	Colombia	1:23:22.7	CR
2nd place, silver medalist(s)	Richard Vargas	Venezuela	1:23:25.6	
3rd place, bronze medalist(s)	Kenny Martín Pérez	Colombia	1:25:08.4	
4	Bruno Fidelis	Brazil	1:26:54.7	
5	Max dos Santos	Brazil	1:32:24.2	
	Marco Antonio Rodríguez	Bolivia	DQ	

=== High jump ===
Final – 5 October 10:00h

Rank	Name	Nationality	Attempts															Result	Notes
Rank	Name	Nationality	1.75	1.80	1.85	1.90	1.95	2.00	2.03	2.06	2.09	2.12	2.15	2.18	2.21	2.24	2.26	Result	Notes
1st place, gold medalist(s)	Fernando Ferreira	Brazil	-	-	-	-	-	-	-	o	xo	xo	xxo	o	xo	xxo	xxx	2.24	CR
2nd place, silver medalist(s)	Eure Yáñez	Venezuela	-	-	-	-	-	-	-	-	-	xxo	o	xxo	xxx			2.18	
3rd place, bronze medalist(s)	Alexander Bowen	Panama	-	-	-	-	-	-	-	o	x-	xo	o	xxx				2.15	
4	Josué da Costa	Brazil	-	-	-	-	-	-	-	o	o	o	xxx					2.12	
5	Williams Ríos	Panama	-	-	-	o	xo	o	-	xxx								2.00	
6	Iuri Camara	Uruguay	-	xo	xxo	o	xxo	xxx										1.95	
7	Nicolás Moratalla	Argentina	-	-	-	o	xxx											1.90	
7	Franco Caravario	Argentina	-	-	-	o	xxx											1.90	
9	Sebastián Rodríguez	Uruguay	o	xo	xxx													1.80	

=== Pole vault ===
Final – 3 October 15:00h

Rank	Name	Nationality	Attempts																	Result	Notes
Rank	Name	Nationality	4.10	4.20	4.30	4.40	4.50	4.60	4.65	4.70	4.75	4.80	4.85	4.90	4.95	5.00	5.05	5.10	5.22	Result	Notes
1st place, gold medalist(s)	José Pacho	Ecuador	-	-	-	-	-	x-	-	-	-	o	-	-	o	x-	xo	xxo	xxx	5.10	^{†}
2nd place, silver medalist(s)	Jeff Oliverio	Brazil	-	-	-	-	-	-	-	-	-	o	x-	xo	x-	o	-	xxx		5.00	
3rd place, bronze medalist(s)	Walter Viáfara	Colombia	-	-	-	-	-	-	-	xxo	-	-	o	-	xxx					4.85	
4	Leonardo dos Santos	Brazil	-	-	-	-	-	xo	-	xxo	o	x-	xx							4.75	
5	Martín Castañares	Uruguay	o	-	o	-	xxx													4.30	
	Daniel Zupeuc	Chile	-	-	-	-	-	xxx												NM	

^{†}:Series not exactly known.

=== Long jump ===
Final – 4 October 9:00h

Rank	Name	Nationality	Attempts						Result	Notes
Rank	Name	Nationality	1	2	3	4	5	6	Result	Notes
1st place, gold medalist(s)	Higor Silva Alves	Brazil	x (+1.7)	7.60 (-0.7)	-	x (+1.7)	x (+0.9)	x (+1.0)	7.60 (-0.7 m/s	
2nd place, silver medalist(s)	Paulo Sérgio Oliveira	Brazil	7.25 (-1.1)	x (+1.3)	7.59 (-0.2)	7.18 (-1.4)	7.47 (+0.1)	7.46 (-1.8)	7.59 (-0.2 m/s	
3rd place, bronze medalist(s)	Juan Mosquera	Panama	7.19 (+0.8)	x (-0.6)	x (-1.2)	x (-3.8)	7.12 (-0.4)	7.40 (-0.4)	7.40 (-0.4 m/s	
4	Santiago Cova	Venezuela	7.07 (+1.4)	7.00 (-5.1)	x (+0.4)	7.18 (+0.1)	7.05 (+0.1)	7.21 (+1.3)	7.21 (1.3 m/s	
5	Álvaro Cortez	Chile	7.00 (-0.1)	7.08 (-1.1)	x (+0.4)	7.06 (-0.9)	7.17 (-0.2)	7.17 (-3.1)	7.08 (-1.1 m/s	
6	Martín González	Uruguay	6.59 (-0.5)	6.17 (-1.2)	6.85 (-0.7)	6.36 (-2.0)	-	-	6.85 (-0.7 m/s	
7	Augusto Negri	Argentina	6.70 w (+2.1)	x (-1.7)	x (-0.9)	6.36 (+0.1)	6.62 (-0.1)	6.59 (+0.3)	6.70 w (2.1 m/s	
8	Sergei Paulenko	Uruguay	6.44 w (+2.1)	6.22 (+0.3)	5.97 (-0.9)	5.95 w (+5.5)	6.45 (-1.0)	6.33 (-1.4)	6.45 (-1.0 m/s	

=== Triple jump ===
Final – 3 October 11:00h

Rank	Name	Nationality	Attempts						Result	Notes
Rank	Name	Nationality	1	2	3	4	5	6	Result	Notes
1st place, gold medalist(s)	Kauam Bento	Brazil	x w (+4.2)	15.51 (-0.0)	15.77 w (+2.8)	-	x w (+5.8)	15.36 (-0.3)	15.77 w (2.8 m/s	
2nd place, silver medalist(s)	Álvaro Cortez	Chile	14.68 (-1.6)	15.27 (-0.2)	15.33 (+0.9)	14.98 (-0.5)	15.36 (+0.8)	15.07 w (+3.4)	15.36 (0.8 m/s	
3rd place, bronze medalist(s)	Mateus de Sá	Brazil	15.20 (-1.2)	15.08 (-0.3)	x (-1.2)	-	x w (+3.6)	15.07	15.20 (-1.2 m/s	
4	Santiago Cova	Venezuela	x (+0.4)	14.92 w (+2.7)	-	14.77 (+0.3)	-	-	14.92 w (2.7 m/s	
5	Diego Dimaro	Argentina	x (+0.6)	13.95 w (+2.3)	13.79 (-0.6)	14.13 (-0.2)	14.49 (-0.4)	14.13 (+1.2)	14.49 (-0.4 m/s	
6	Nicolás Pettorossi	Uruguay	13.97 (-0.3)	13.23 (-0.8)	-	x (-0.3)	-	-	13.97 (-0.3 m/s	NR-y

=== Shot put ===
Final – 5 October 10:00h

Rank	Name	Nationality	Attempts						Result	Notes
Rank	Name	Nationality	1	2	3	4	5	6	Result	Notes
1st place, gold medalist(s)	Willian Braido	Brazil	x	18.18	17.24	17.95	17.98	17.98	18.18	
2nd place, silver medalist(s)	Willian Dourado	Brazil	x	17.18	17.61	x	16.72	17.19	17.61	
3rd place, bronze medalist(s)	Juan Caicedo	Ecuador	14.87	15.28	15.74	15.69	16.17	15.73	16.17	
4	Joaquín Ballivián	Chile	15.23	x	15.52	x	x	16.10	16.10	
5	Santiago Espín	Ecuador	14.74	14.66	15.49	15.45	15.41	15.96	15.96	
6	Andrés Arce	Argentina	x	14.68	15.71	x	15.29	x	15.71	
7	Gabriel Andia	Chile	15.69	15.36	15.12	x	14.97	x	15.69	

=== Discus throw ===
Final – 3 October 17:00h

Rank	Name	Nationality	Attempts						Result	Notes
Rank	Name	Nationality	1	2	3	4	5	6	Result	Notes
1st place, gold medalist(s)	Mauricio Ortega	Colombia	59.54	60.46	56.17	x	x	x	60.46	CR
2nd place, silver medalist(s)	Felipe Lorenzon	Brazil	53.37	x	x	54.70	56.21	x	56.21	
3rd place, bronze medalist(s)	Mario Luis David Junior	Brazil	53.04	52.37	55.40	x	51.16	x	55.40	
4	Juan José Caicedo	Ecuador	x	53.97	53.83	x	x	x	53.97	
5	Juan Solito	Argentina	50.54	50.68	46.11	51.28	51.44	52.61	52.61	
6	Andrés Arce	Argentina	46.31	x	x	x	42.81	44.78	46.31	
7	Nicolás Piriz	Uruguay	39.91	41.94	41.52	44.61	x	42.62	44.61	
8	Gabriel Andia	Chile	42.99	x	x	44.10	42.97	x	44.10	

=== Hammer throw ===
Final – 3 October 11:15h

Rank	Name	Nationality	Attempts						Result	Notes
Rank	Name	Nationality	1	2	3	4	5	6	Result	Notes
1st place, gold medalist(s)	Joaquín Gómez	Argentina	65.82	65.66	67.98	x	-	66.66	67.98	CR
2nd place, silver medalist(s)	Humberto Mansilla	Chile	62.56	63.08	65.27	x	x	x	65.27	
3rd place, bronze medalist(s)	Gabriel Kehr	Chile	63.38	x	59.45	60.70	x	x	63.38	
4	Elias Díaz	Colombia	58.28	60.13	62.51	x	61.73	62.04	62.51	
5	Franco García	Argentina	x	60.70	62.38	x	x	x	62.38	
6	Thiago da Silva	Brazil	58.37	x	60.11	59.08	59.47	x	60.11	
7	Jonathan Cardoso	Brazil	58.34	58.60	57.83	56.49	60.05	57.58	60.05	

=== Javelin throw ===
Final – 5 October 14:15h

Rank	Name	Nationality	Attempts						Result	Notes
Rank	Name	Nationality	1	2	3	4	5	6	Result	Notes
1st place, gold medalist(s)	Braian Toledo	Argentina	70.74	76.40	72.84	71.41	77.75	x	77.75	
2nd place, silver medalist(s)	Tomás Guerra	Chile	65.30	70.00	x	68.09	x	x	70.00	
3rd place, bronze medalist(s)	Fabián Jara	Paraguay	66.30	68.12	66.79	66.33	68.78	64.21	68.78	
4	Giovanni Díaz	Paraguay	60.75	66.11	56.36	62.85	59.65	x	66.11	
5	Andrés Valencia	Colombia	65.18	x	64.06	-	-	-	65.18	
6	Fernando Martins	Brazil	58.21	x	61.19	54.80	x	55.99	61.19	
7	Mauricio Filgueiras	Brazil	x	x	59.74	56.20	x	57.25	59.74	
8	Jonathan Cedeo	Panama	52.97	57.32	58.62	x	54.42	56.91	58.62	
9	Christian Spaulding	Ecuador	x	x	56.00	-	-	-	56.00	
10	Federico Lemos	Uruguay	48.60	47.90	51.31	-	-	-	51.31	
11	Braian Ruso	Uruguay	50.15	x	48.33	-	-	-	50.15	

=== Decathlon ===
Final – 3/4 October

The highest mark recorded in each event is highlighted in yellow

Rank	Name	Nationality	100m	LJ	SP	HJ	400m	110m H	DT	PV	JT	1500m	Points	Notes
1st place, gold medalist(s)	Renato dos Santos	Brazil	11.10 (0); 838pts	6.85 (2.6); 778pts	12.89; 661pts	1.79; 619pts	48.74; 874pts	15.06 (0); 842pts	34.38; 551pts	4.10; 645pts	47.07; 545pts	4:41.29; 672pts	7025	
2nd place, silver medalist(s)	Guillermo Ruggeri	Argentina	11.21 (0); 814pts	6.61 (2.6); 723pts	12.60; 643pts	1.91; 723pts	49.41; 842pts	14.62 (0); 896pts	37.24; 609pts	3.70; 535pts	47.74; 555pts	5:02.31; 547pts	6887	
3rd place, bronze medalist(s)	Yuri da Silva	Brazil	11.07 (0); 845pts	6.59 (0.2); 718pts	11.09; 551pts	1.91; 723pts	49.50; 838pts	15.00 (0); 850pts	38.18; 628pts	4.00; 617pts	44.53; 508pts	4:54.88; 590pts	6868	
4	José Gregorio Milanesse	Venezuela	11.49 (0); 755pts	6.46 (-0.1); 688pts	11.53; 578pts	1.91; 723pts	51.56; 744pts	16.03 (0); 729pts	31.62; 496pts	3.90; 590pts	50.55; 597pts	4:50.89; 613pts	6513	
5	Matías Péndola	Chile	11.43 (0); 767pts	6.22 (-0.1); 635pts	11.07; 550pts	1.91; 723pts	49.96; 816pts	16.93 (0); 632pts	36.20; 588pts	3.30; 431pts	43.10; 487pts	4:33.31; 723pts	6352	
6	Óscar Campos	Venezuela	DQ; 0pts	6.61 (1.7); 723pts	12.41; 631pts	1.73; 569pts	50.13; 809pts	15.05 (0); 843pts	40.61; 677pts	4.20; 673pts	52.29; 623pts	4:48.39; 628pts	6176	

== Women's results ==
=== 100 meters ===
Heat 1 – 3 October 9:30h - Wind: 2.5 m/s

Rank	Name	Nationality	Time	Notes
1	Bruna Farias	Brazil	11.51 w	Q
2	Vitoria Cristina Rosa	Brazil	11.66 w	Q
3	Josefina Gutiérrez	Chile	12.26 w	Q
4	Paula Pisano	Uruguay	12.49 w	q
5	Yara Martínez	Uruguay	12.57 w	q

Heat 2 – 3 October 9:30h - Wind: 0.5 m/s

Rank	Name	Nationality	Time	Notes
1	Andrea Purica	Venezuela	11.62	Q
2	Nediam Vargas	Venezuela	11.73	Q
3	Maribel Caicedo	Ecuador	12.80	Q
4	Lize Marlene López	Paraguay	13.21	
	Noelia Martínez	Argentina	DNS	

Final – 3 October 16:40h - Wind: -1.2 m/s

Rank	Name	Nationality	Time	Notes
1st place, gold medalist(s)	Andrea Purica	Venezuela	11.50	
2nd place, silver medalist(s)	Bruna Farias	Brazil	11.52	
3rd place, bronze medalist(s)	Vitoria Cristina Rosa	Brazil	11.64	
4	Nediam Vargas	Venezuela	11.79	
5	Josefina Gutiérrez	Chile	12.04	
6	Maribel Caicedo	Ecuador	12.46	
7	Paula Pisano	Uruguay	12.59	
8	Yara Martínez	Uruguay	12.71	

=== 200 meters ===
Heat 1 – 5 October 9:00h - Wind: 2.3 m/s

Rank	Name	Nationality	Time	Notes
1	Nediam Vargas	Venezuela	23.62 w	Q
2	Bruna Farias	Brazil	23.85 w	Q
3	Valeria Baron	Argentina	25.36 w	Q
4	Laura Lupano	Uruguay	25.76 w	
	Josefina Gutiérrez	Chile	DNF	

Heat 2 – 5 October 9:00h - Wind: 2.8 m/s

Rank	Name	Nationality	Time	Notes
1	Karina da Rosa	Brazil	23.98 w	Q
2	Isidora Jiménez	Chile	24.01 w	Q
3	Andrea Purica	Venezuela	24.25 w	Q
4	Noelia Martínez	Argentina	24.58 w	q
5	Paula Pisano	Uruguay	25.71 w	q
6	Lize Marlene López	Paraguay	26.17 w	

Final – 5 October 15:00h - Wind: 0.4 m/s

Rank	Name	Nationality	Time	Notes
1st place, gold medalist(s)	Bruna Farias	Brazil	23.61	
2nd place, silver medalist(s)	Isidora Jiménez	Chile	23.72	712
3rd place, bronze medalist(s)	Karina da Rosa	Brazil	23.72	718
4	Nediam Vargas	Venezuela	23.84	
5	Andrea Purica	Venezuela	24.13	PB
6	Noelia Martínez	Argentina	24.54	
7	Valeria Baron	Argentina	24.78	
8	Paula Pisano	Uruguay	25.89	

=== 400 meters ===
Heat 1 – 3 October 10:30h

Rank	Name	Nationality	Time	Notes
1	Leticia de Souza	Brazil	55.73	Q
2	Maitte Torres	Peru	56.11	Q
3	Maryury Valdez	Venezuela	56.66	Q
4	Yadira Méndez	Ecuador	57.39	q
5	Deysi Parra	Peru	57.48	
6	Valeria Baron	Argentina	57.87	

Heat 2 – 3 October 10:30h

Rank	Name	Nationality	Time	Notes
1	Natallia Silva	Brazil	54.03	Q
2	Déborah Rodríguez	Uruguay	54.64	Q
3	Betiana Hernández	Argentina	57.26	Q
4	Odellani Monges	Venezuela	57.41	q
5	Andrea Calderón	Ecuador	57.60	
6	Laura Lupano	Uruguay	57.89	

Final – 3 October 18:30h

Rank	Name	Nationality	Time	Notes
1st place, gold medalist(s)	Déborah Rodríguez	Uruguay	52.53	CR
2nd place, silver medalist(s)	Natallia Silva	Brazil	53.14	
3rd place, bronze medalist(s)	Leticia de Souza	Brazil	53.96	
4	Maitte Torres	Peru	55.54	
5	Maryury Valdez	Venezuela	56.29	
6	Betiana Hernández	Argentina	56.99	
7	Odellani Monges	Venezuela	58.24	
	Yadira Méndez	Ecuador	DNS	

=== 800 meters ===
Final – 4 October 17:45h

Rank	Name	Nationality	Time	Notes
1st place, gold medalist(s)	Déborah Rodríguez	Uruguay	2:08.65	
2nd place, silver medalist(s)	Mariana Borelli	Argentina	2:09.24	
3rd place, bronze medalist(s)	María Pía Fernández	Uruguay	2:09.89	
4	July da Silva	Brazil	2:10.07	
5	Yadira Méndez	Ecuador	2:10.53	
6	Andrea Calderón	Ecuador	2:10.59	
7	Alissandra Araújo	Brazil	2:12.24	
8	Fátima Amarilla	Paraguay	2:19.83	
9	Katheryn Velázquez	Paraguay	2:21.79	

=== 1500 meters ===
Final – 5 October 15:50h

Rank	Name	Nationality	Time	Notes
1st place, gold medalist(s)	Flávia de Lima	Brazil	4:21.05	CR
2nd place, silver medalist(s)	Erika Machado	Brazil	4:23.58	
3rd place, bronze medalist(s)	Zulema Arenas	Peru	4:25.30	
4	Mariana Borelli	Argentina	4:33.13	
5	Pia Fernández	Uruguay	4:35.85	
6	Katerine Cardozo	Uruguay	4:42.27	
7	Cecilia Luizaga	Bolivia	4:53.25	
8	Maria Leticia Añazco	Paraguay	5:00.30	
9	Katheryn Velázquez	Paraguay	5:08.06	

=== 5000 meters ===
Final – 3 October 15:00h

Rank	Name	Nationality	Time	Notes
1st place, gold medalist(s)	Soledad Torre	Peru	16:39.95	CR
2nd place, silver medalist(s)	Jovana de la Cruz	Peru	16:43.40	
3rd place, bronze medalist(s)	Giselle Álvarez	Chile	16:51.22	
4	Jéssica Paguay	Ecuador	16:53.02	
5	Adriana da Luz	Brazil	16:57.38	
6	Jessica Soares	Brazil	18:01.86	
7	Katerine Cardozo	Uruguay	18:13.65	
8	Helen Baltazar	Bolivia	18:46.09	

=== 10,000 meters ===
Final – 5 October 10:15h

Rank	Name	Nationality	Time	Notes
1st place, gold medalist(s)	Giselle Álvarez	Chile	35:28.30	
2nd place, silver medalist(s)	Luzmery Rojas	Peru	35:32.56	
3rd place, bronze medalist(s)	Jéssica Paguay	Ecuador	35:35.75	
4	Dina Ramos	Peru	35:44.76	
5	Jessica Soares	Brazil	36:40.30	
	Adriana da Luz	Brazil	DNF	

=== 100 meters hurdles ===
Heat 1 – 4 October 10:10h - Wind: 1.7 m/s

Rank	Name	Nationality	Time	Notes
1	Génesis Romero	Venezuela	13.73	Q
2	Diana Bazalar	Peru	14.08	Q
3	Adriana Lastra	Ecuador	14.55	Q
4	Noelina Madarieta	Argentina	14.92	q
5	Paula Dulcic	Argentina	15.28	

Heat 2 – 4 October 10:10h - Wind: 3.5 m/s

Rank	Name	Nationality	Time	Notes
1	Gabriela Lima	Brazil	13.83 w	Q
2	Maria Ignacia Eguiguren	Chile	13.86 w	Q 855
3	Dayara Germano	Brazil	13.86 w	Q 860
4	Natalia Pinzón	Colombia	14.17 w	q

Final – 4 October 15:00h - Wind: 2.4 m/s

Rank	Name	Nationality	Time	Notes
1st place, gold medalist(s)	Génesis Romero	Venezuela	13.51 w	
2nd place, silver medalist(s)	Gabriela Lima	Brazil	13.81 w	
3rd place, bronze medalist(s)	Maria Ignacia Eguiguren	Chile	13.93 w	926
4	Diana Bazalar	Peru	13.93 w	930
5	Dayara Germano	Brazil	14.34 w	
6	Natalia Pinzón	Colombia	14.39 w	
7	Adriana Lastra	Ecuador	14.57 w	
8	Noelina Madarieta	Argentina	14.92 w	

=== 400 meters hurdles ===
Final – 5 October 17:20h

Rank	Name	Nationality	Time	Notes
1st place, gold medalist(s)	Déborah Rodríguez	Uruguay	58.49	
2nd place, silver medalist(s)	Geisa dos Santos	Brazil	59.53	
3rd place, bronze medalist(s)	Brenda da Costa	Brazil	60.86	
4	Maitte Torres	Peru	61.21	
5	Yenifer Silva	Uruguay	65.23	
6	Fátima Amarilla	Paraguay	65.75	

=== 3000 meters steeplechase ===
Final – 4 October 11:00h

Rank	Name	Nationality	Time	Notes
1st place, gold medalist(s)	Zulema Arenas	Peru	10:06.25	CR
2nd place, silver medalist(s)	Jovana de la Cruz	Peru	10:18.74	
3rd place, bronze medalist(s)	July da Silva	Brazil	10:34.62	
4	Carolina Lozano	Argentina	10:51.18	
5	Viviane Lyra	Brazil	11:01.93	
6	Cecilia Luizaga	Bolivia	11:20.79	
7	Aldana Machado	Uruguay	11:25.99	

=== 4x100 meters relay ===
Final – 4 October 18:10h

Rank	Nation	Competitors	Time	Notes
1st place, gold medalist(s)	Brazil	Vitoria Cristina Rosa; Bruna Farias; Andressa Fidelis; Evelyn de Paula	45.44	
2nd place, silver medalist(s)	Venezuela	Johana Pirela; Andrea Purica; Génesis Romero; Nediam Vargas	46.50	
3rd place, bronze medalist(s)	Chile	Macarena Borie; Josefina Gutiérrez; Maria Ignacia Eguiguren; Isidora Jiménez	46.80	
4	Ecuador	Juliana Angulo; Maribel Caicedo; Adriana Lastra; Ángela Tenorio	47.81	
	Uruguay	Yessica Maciel; Lorena Aires; Yara Martínez; Paula Pisano	DQ	
	Argentina	Noelina Madarieta; Josefina Loyza; Valeria Baron; Noelia Martínez	DNF	

=== 4x400 meters relay ===
Final – 5 October 18:40h

Rank	Nation	Competitors	Time	Notes
1st place, gold medalist(s)	Brazil	Jessica da Silva; Lourdes Dallazem; Natallia Silva; Flávia de Lima	3:42.07	
2nd place, silver medalist(s)	Venezuela	Johana Pirela; Maryury Valdez; Odellani Monges; Nediam Vargas	3:45.89	
3rd place, bronze medalist(s)	Uruguay	Laura Lupano; Pia Fernández; Yenifer Silva; Déborah Rodríguez	3:50.35	
4	Peru	Diana Bazalar; Soledad Torre; Maitte Torres; Deysi Parra	3:55.00	
5	Paraguay	Maria Leticia Añazco; Lizet Gómez; Katheryn Velázquez; Fátima Amarilla	4:10.03	
	Argentina	Betiana Hernández; Mariana Borelli; Noelia Martínez; Valeria Baron	DQ	
	Chile	Josefina Gutiérrez; María Victoria Fernández; Maria Ignacia Eguiguren; Macarena Borie	DNS	

=== 20,000 meters walk ===
Final – 4 October 11:55h

Rank	Name	Nationality	Time	Notes
1st place, gold medalist(s)	Wendy Cornejo	Bolivia	1:37:43.1	CR
2nd place, silver medalist(s)	Ángela Castro	Bolivia	1:38:55.7	
3rd place, bronze medalist(s)	Yeseida Carrillo	Colombia	1:42:20.5	
4	Ana Leydy Daza	Colombia	1:44:41.7	
5	Andresa da Silva	Brazil	1:50:21.9	
	Yenni Ortiz	Argentina	DNF	
	Elysle Albino	Brazil	DNF	

=== High jump ===
Final – 5 October 16:00h

Rank	Name	Nationality	Attempts									Result	Notes
Rank	Name	Nationality	1.55	1.60	1.65	1.70	1.73	1.76	1.79	1.82	1.85	Result	Notes
1st place, gold medalist(s)	Tamara de Sousa	Brazil	-	-	o	o	o	o	xo	o	xxx	1.82	
2nd place, silver medalist(s)	Ana Paula de Oliveira	Brazil	-	-	-	o	xxo	xo	xxo	o	xxx	1.82	
3rd place, bronze medalist(s)	Betsabé Páez	Argentina	-	-	-	o	o	xxo	xxx			1.76	
4	Lorena Aires	Uruguay	-	o	o	o	xxx					1.70	
5	Candy Toche	Peru	-	o	o	xxx						1.65	
6	Mariana Rojas	Argentina	-	o	xxo	xxx						1.65	
7	Ana Martínez	Panama	xo	xo	xxx							1.60	

=== Pole vault ===
Final – 3 October 9:30h

Rank	Name	Nationality	Attempts							Result	Notes
Rank	Name	Nationality	3.40	3.50	3.60	3.70	3.80	3.90	4.00	Result	Notes
1st place, gold medalist(s)	Robeilys Peinado	Venezuela	-	-	-	o	-	o	xxx	3.90	
2nd place, silver medalist(s)	Juliana Campos	Brazil	-	o	o	xo	xxx			3.70	
3rd place, bronze medalist(s)	Noelina Madarieta	Argentina	-	-	o	xxx				3.60	
4	María Victoria Fernández	Chile	xo	-	o	xxx				3.60	
5	Nayara Sobrinho dos Santos	Brazil	-	-	xxo	-	xxx			3.60	

=== Long jump ===
Final – 4 October 14:30h

Rank	Name	Nationality	Attempts						Result	Notes
Rank	Name	Nationality	1	2	3	4	5	6	Result	Notes
1st place, gold medalist(s)	Yulimar Rojas	Venezuela	5.94 (-0.0)	6.12 (-0.8)	x (-0.9)	6.16 (+1.4)	6.15 (+0.3)	6.36 (+0.8)	6.36 (0.8 m/s	CR
2nd place, silver medalist(s)	Jessica dos Reis	Brazil	6.20 (-4.7)	5.98 (-1.5)	6.11 (-0.4)	6.18 (-1.8)	x (-4.7)	6.35 (+0.7)	6.35 (0.7 m/s	
3rd place, bronze medalist(s)	Juliana Angulo	Ecuador	x (-0.7)	x (-0.6)	5.89 (-0.0)	6.16 (+0.8)	x w (+3.7)	6.07 (+1.3)	6.16 (0.8 m/s	
4	Paula Neves	Brazil	5.76 (-1.5)	6.14 (-2.0)	6.06 w (+2.1)	6.07 (-1.6)	6.09 (-0.4)	6.13 w (+3.3)	6.14 (-2.0 m/s	
5	Génesis Romero	Venezuela	5.99 (+0.6)	-	x (-1.1)	5.78 (-0.1)	5.97 (-2.2)	x (-1.3)	5.99 (0.6 m/s	
6	Macarena Borie	Chile	4.07 (-0.3)	5.58 (+0.2)	5.83 (-1.1)	5.58 (-0.7)	x (-0.1)	5.60 (-0.2)	5.83 (-1.1 m/s	
7	Jennifer Clayton	Panama	5.78 (+0.1)	5.36 (-2.9)	5.33 (-1.4)	-	-	-	5.78 (0.1 m/s	
8	Josefina Loyza	Argentina	5.39 (-1.4)	5.68 (-0.1)	5.61 (-0.4)	5.70 (+2.0)	5.35 (-1.2)	5.51 (-2.2)	5.70 (2.0 m/s	
9	Nathaly Aranda	Panama	x (-0.4)	5.63 (-2.5)	x (-0.8)	-	-	-	5.63 (-2.5 m/s	
10	Alexa Morey	Peru	x (+1.2)	5.54 (-0.3)	x (-0.2)	-	-	-	5.54 (-0.3 m/s	
11	Josefina Gutiérrez	Chile	5.31 (-3.1)	x (-1.1)	5.52 (-0.5)	-	-	-	5.52 (-0.5 m/s	
12	Lizet Gómez	Paraguay	5.42 (-0.5)	5.16 (-3.6)	5.37 (-0.5)	-	-	-	5.42 (-0.5 m/s	
13	Belén Pastorino	Uruguay	5.08 (-2.2)	5.04 (+1.9)	x (-1.0)	-	-	-	5.08 (-2.2 m/s	
14	Leslie de Mederos	Uruguay	4.88 (-0.9)	4.74 (-1.8)	4.87 (-0.7)	-	-	-	4.88 (-0.9 m/s	

=== Triple jump ===
Final – 3 October 8:45h

Rank	Name	Nationality	Attempts						Result	Notes
Rank	Name	Nationality	1	2	3	4	5	6	Result	Notes
1st place, gold medalist(s)	Yulimar Rojas	Venezuela	12.93 (-0.4)	13.14 (-0.1)	13.34 (-1.3)	13.29 (-0.7)	13.35 (-1.8)	x (+0.5)	13.35 (-1.8 m/s	
2nd place, silver medalist(s)	Núbia Soares	Brazil	x (-0.5)	12.76 (-0.4)	12.95 (+0.8)	13.31 (-0.7)	x (-0.8)	12.75 (+0.5)	13.31 (-0.7 m/s	
3rd place, bronze medalist(s)	Claudine de Jesus	Brazil	x (-0.7)	12.67 (-2.4)	12.81 (+0.0)	12.75 w (+3.7)	x w (+2.1)	x (-0.4)	12.81 (0.0 m/s	
4	Mirian Reyes	Peru	12.22 (-1.3)	12.20 (-1.2)	12.39 (+0.4)	12.77 w (+2.6)	12.73 (-0.8)	x (+0.1)	12.77 w (2.6 m/s	
5	Lizet Gómez	Paraguay	11.50 (-0.5)	11.50 (-1.5)	11.67 (+0.9)	11.21 (+1.2)	11.34 (-0.4)	11.06 (-0.1)	11.67 (0.9 m/s	

=== Shot put ===
Final – 4 October 16:15h

Rank	Name	Nationality	Attempts						Result	Notes
Rank	Name	Nationality	1	2	3	4	5	6	Result	Notes
1st place, gold medalist(s)	Ivana Gallardo	Chile	14.14	14.64	16.20	x	x	15.02	16.20	
2nd place, silver medalist(s)	Izabela da Silva	Brazil	14.45	15.09	15.36	x	15.95	x	15.95	
3rd place, bronze medalist(s)	Esthefania da Costa	Brazil	14.42	15.06	14.32	14.99	15.09	15.18	15.18	
4	Giohanny Rojas	Venezuela	x	14.71	x	x	14.22	x	14.71	
5	Alessandra Gamboa	Peru	x	14.36	x	x	x	x	14.36	
6	Cecilia Rodríguez	Uruguay	13.47	13.41	14.16	13.70	13.09	13.79	14.16	
7	Abigail Guzmán	Argentina	12.04	12.71	13.46	12.64	12.03	11.34	13.46	
8	Rocío Aranda	Argentina	x	12.75	x	12.65	x	x	12.75	

=== Discus throw ===
Final – 3 October 14:15h

Rank	Name	Nationality	Attempts						Result	Notes
Rank	Name	Nationality	1	2	3	4	5	6	Result	Notes
1st place, gold medalist(s)	Izabela da Silva	Brazil	x	52.83	58.70	52.43	x	x	58.70	CR
2nd place, silver medalist(s)	Lidiane Cansian	Brazil	55.61	x	56.77	x	52.50	x	56.77	
3rd place, bronze medalist(s)	Ivana Gallardo	Chile	x	50.14	50.50	51.75	48.40	49.97	51.75	
4	Elizabeth Álvarez	Venezuela	x	46.19	x	x	x	48.28	48.28	
5	Maia Varela	Argentina	47.69	46.51	45.45	x	47.52	x	47.69	
6	Rocío Aranda	Argentina	43.47	44.72	47.38	45.94	45.72	43.34	47.38	
7	Micaela Garbarino	Uruguay	37.26	39.37	x	x	34.92	37.08	39.37	
8	Ayleen González	Panama	x	x	32.06	x	x	x	32.06	

=== Hammer throw ===
Final – 3 October 8:45h

Rank	Name	Nationality	Attempts						Result	Notes
Rank	Name	Nationality	1	2	3	4	5	6	Result	Notes
1st place, gold medalist(s)	Génesis Olivera	Venezuela	63.80	61.05	61.31	x	x	60.89	63.80	
2nd place, silver medalist(s)	Mariana Marcelino	Brazil	55.63	61.18	58.40	61.13	x	x	61.18	
3rd place, bronze medalist(s)	Paola Miranda	Paraguay	x	56.41	x	x	53.83	57.06	57.06	
4	Mveh Gracielle	Brazil	x	50.37	56.45	56.33	x	55.85	56.45	
5	Nathaly Ojeda	Ecuador	52.71	54.01	x	54.82	53.57	51.14	54.82	
6	Daniela Gómez	Argentina	53.75	54.21	49.70	x	54.30	52.29	54.30	
7	Elisa Mina	Ecuador	51.63	53.33	x	53.77	x	x	53.77	
8	Araceli Montivero	Argentina	50.22	50.23	51.58	x	x	x	51.58	
9	Bruna Lima	Uruguay	x	48.07	49.02	-	-	-	49.02	
10	Luciana Acosta	Uruguay	x	x	48.09	-	-	-	48.09	
11	Dagmar Alvarado	Panama	x	x	43.43	-	-	-	43.43	

=== Javelin throw ===
Final – 5 October 17:00h

Rank	Name	Nationality	Attempts						Result	Notes
Rank	Name	Nationality	1	2	3	4	5	6	Result	Notes
1st place, gold medalist(s)	Edivania Araújo	Brazil	52.82	51.39	47.64	53.79	47.78	49.26	53.79	
2nd place, silver medalist(s)	Daniella Nisimura	Brazil	50.21	49.74	53.46	49.60	50.13	53.25	53.46	
3rd place, bronze medalist(s)	Laura Paredes	Paraguay	48.01	51.19	48.58	x	x	42.62	51.19	
4	María Mello	Uruguay	43.16	48.30	40.80	47.18	46.94	45.78	48.30	
5	Denisse Vargas	Ecuador	46.71	47.96	46.13	45.61	x	44.44	47.96	
6	Dominella Arias	Argentina	43.97	36.92	45.01	46.32	43.75	39.65	46.32	
7	Valentina Salazar	Chile	45.37	46.09	42.59	45.22	43.61	43.94	46.09	

=== Heptathlon ===
Final – 4/5 October

The highest mark recorded in each event is highlighted in yellow

Rank	Name	Nationality	100m H	HJ	SP	200m	LJ	JT	800m	Points	Notes
1st place, gold medalist(s)	Evelis Aguilar	Colombia	14.91 (-1.2); 854pts	1.61; 747pts	11.78; 647pts	24.36 (0); 946pts	5.39 (0.4); 668pts	35.28; 577pts	2:14.92; 894pts	5333	
2nd place, silver medalist(s)	Fiorella Chiappe	Argentina	14.44 (-1.2); 917pts	1.73; 891pts	10.89; 588pts	25.41 (0); 850pts	5.38 (-1.8); 665pts	32.06; 516pts	2:23.23; 780pts	5207	
3rd place, bronze medalist(s)	Karen Lopes	Brazil	14.39 (-1.2); 924pts	1.55; 678pts	11.62; 636pts	24.84 (0); 902pts	5.40 (-1.2); 671pts	39.89; 665pts	2:37.75; 599pts	5075	
4	Martina Corra	Argentina	14.74 (-1.2); 876pts	1.55; 678pts	11.79; 647pts	25.60 (0); 833pts	4.98 (-1.7); 554pts	41.28; 692pts	2:28.54; 711pts	4991	
5	Lais Pereira	Brazil	15.19 (-1.2); 817pts	1.58; 712pts	8.90; 458pts	24.92 (0); 894pts	5.18 (-1.5); 609pts	23.33; 351pts	2:22.45; 791pts	4632	
6	Weinie Castillo	Ecuador	14.42 (-1.2); 920pts	1.55; 678pts	10.70; 575pts	25.32 (0); 858pts	4.95 (-0.7); 546pts	28.66; 451pts	2:40.32; 569pts	4597	
7	Javiera Brahn	Chile	15.12 (-1.2); 826pts	1.49; 610pts	10.75; 579pts	25.60 (0); 833pts	5.30 (-1.2); 643pts	25.23; 387pts	2:32.48; 662pts	4540	
8	Kimberly de Mederos	Uruguay	16.23 (-1.2); 686pts	1.52; 644pts	9.06; 468pts	25.95 (0); 802pts	5.08 (-1.7); 581pts	29.40; 465pts	2:34.98; 632pts	4278	

== Note ==
The names of the Brazilian athletes were completed using the published list of participants.
