= 2014 IAAF World Relays – Women's 4 × 100 metres relay =

Women's 4 × 100 metres relay at the 2014 IAAF World Relays
- Venue: Thomas Robinson Stadium
- Dates: 24 may (heats & final)

The women's 4 × 100 metres relay at the 2014 IAAF World Relays was held at the Thomas Robinson Stadium on 24 May.

== Records ==
Prior to the competition, the records were as follows:

World record	United States (Tianna Madison, Allyson Felix, Bianca Knight, Carmelita Jeter)	40.82	(United Kingdom) London, Great Britain	10 August 2012
Championship record	New event			
World Leading	Jamaica	42.81	Philadelphia, United States	26 April 2014
African Record	Nigeria (Beatrice Utondu, Faith Idehen, Christy Opara, Mary Onyali)	42.39	Barcelona, Spain	7 August 1992
Asian Record	China (Xiao Lin, Li Yali, Liu Xiaomei, Li Xuemei)	42.23	Shanghai, China	23 October 1997
North, Central American and Caribbean record	United States (Tianna Madison, Allyson Felix, Bianca Knight, Carmelita Jeter)	40.82	(United Kingdom) London, Great Britain	10 August 2012
South American Record	Brazil (Evelyn dos Santos, Ana Claudia Silva, Franciela Krasucki, Rosângela Santos)	42.29	Moscow, Russia	18 August 2013
European Record	East Germany (Silke Gladisch-Möller, Sabine Rieger-Günther, Ingrid Auerswald-Lange, Marlies Göhr)	41.37	Canberra, Australia	6 October 1985
Oceanian record	Australia (Rachael Massey, Suzanne Broadrick, Jodi Lambert, Melinda Gainsford-Taylor)	42.99	Pietersburg, South Africa	18 March 2000

== Schedule ==
Date	Time	Round
24 May 2014	17:47	Heats
24 May 2014	20:02	Final

All times are local times (UTC−4)

== Results ==
KEY:	q	Fastest non-qualifiers	Q	Qualified	NR	National record	PB	Personal best	SB	Seasonal best

=== Heats ===
Qualification: First 2 of each heat (Q) plus the 2 fastest times (q) advanced to the final.

Rank	Heat	Lane	Nation	Athletes	Time	Notes
1	1	3	United States	Tianna Bartoletta, Alexandria Anderson, Jeneba Tarmoh, LaKeisha Lawson	42.29	Q, CR
1	2	4	Jamaica	Carrie Russell, Kerron Stewart, Schillonie Calvert, Samantha Henry-Robinson	42.29	Q, CR
3	1	8	Trinidad and Tobago	Kamaria Durant, Michelle-Lee Ahye, Reyare Thomas, Kai Selvon	42.59	Q, SB
4	2	5	Nigeria	Gloria Asumnu, Blessing Okagbare, Dominique Duncan, Francesca Okwara	42.77	Q, SB
5	1	4	Germany	Yasmin Kwadwo, Inna Weit, Tatjana Lofamakanda Pinto, Verena Sailer	42.92	q, SB
6	3	6	Great Britain	Asha Philip, Anyika Onuora, Jodie Williams, Desirèe Henry	43.20	Q
7	2	7	Brazil	Vanusa dos Santos, Franciela Krasucki, Evelyn dos Santos, Rosângela Santos	43.22	q, SB
8	3	3	France	Éloyse Lesueur, Céline Distel-Bonnet, Émilie Gaydu, Stella Akakpo	43.35	Q, SB
9	1	6	Switzerland	Michelle Cueni, Marisa Lavanchy, Mujinga Kambundji, Léa Sprunger	43.41	SB
10	3	7	Bahamas	V'Alonée Robinson, Sheniqua Ferguson, Tayla Carter, Anthonique Strachan	43.54	SB
11	2	8	Canada	Khamica Bingham, Kimberly Hyacinthe, Crystal Emmanuel, Shai-Anne Davis	43.69	SB
12	3	4	Puerto Rico	Beatriz Cruz, Celiangeli Morales, Genoiska Cancel, Carol Rodríguez	44.04	SB
13	3	8	Poland	Anna Kiełbasińska, Weronika Wedler, Marta Jeschke, Ewelina Ptak	44.07	SB
14	2	3	China	Tao Yujia, Kong Lingwei, Lin Huijun, Yuan Qiqi	44.12	SB
15	1	5	Dominican Republic	LaVonne Idlette, Fany Chalas, Marleni Mejia, Margarita Menzueta	44.30	SB
16	2	6	British Virgin Islands	Ashley Kelly, Nelda Huggins, Chantel Malone, Karene King	44.53	SB
17	2	2	Venezuela	Wilmary Álvarez, Andrea Purica, Nediam Vargas, Nercely Soto	44.64	SB
18	3	5	Japan	Saori Kitakaze, Anna Doi, Mayumi Watanabe, Kana Ichikawa	44.66	
19	1	7	Australia	Margaret Gayen, Ella Nelson, Monica Brennan, Elly Graff	44.69	

=== Final ===
==== Final B ====
Rank	Lane	Nation	Athletes	Time	Notes
9	5	Canada	Khamica Bingham, Kimberly Hyacinthe, Crystal Emmanuel, Shai-Anne Davis	43.33	SB
10	6	Bahamas	V'Alonée Robinson, Sheniqua Ferguson, Caché Armbrister, Anthonique Strachan	43.46	SB
11	4	Switzerland	Michelle Cueni, Marisa Lavanchy, Mujinga Kambundji, Léa Sprunger	43.55	
12	3	Puerto Rico	Beatriz Cruz, Celiangeli Morales, Genoiska Cancel, Carol Rodríguez	43.99	SB
13	8	China	Tao Yujia, Zhu Yayun, Lin Huijun, Yuan Qiqi	44.09	SB
14	7	Poland	Anna Kiełbasińska, Weronika Wedler, Marta Jeschke, Angelika Stępień	44.59	
15	1	British Virgin Islands	Ashley Kelly, Nelda Huggins, Chantel Malone, Karene King	45.06	
	2	Dominican Republic	María Luisa Rodríguez, Fany Chalas, Marleni Mejia, Margarita Manzueta	DQ	R170.7

==== Final A ====
Rank	Lane	Nation	Athletes	Time	Notes	Points
1st place, gold medalist(s)	4	United States	Tianna Bartoletta, Alexandria Anderson, Jeneba Tarmoh, LaKeisha Lawson	41.88	CR	8
2nd place, silver medalist(s)	5	Jamaica	Carrie Russell, Kerron Stewart, Schillonie Calvert, Samantha Henry-Robinson	42.28	SB	7
3rd place, bronze medalist(s)	3	Trinidad and Tobago	Kamaria Durant, Michelle-Lee Ahye, Reyare Thomas, Kai Selvon	42.66		6
4	8	Nigeria	Gloria Asumnu, Blessing Okagbare, Dominique Duncan, Francesca Okwara	42.67	SB	5
5	6	Great Britain	Asha Philip, Bianca Williams, Jodie Williams, Desirèe Henry	42.75	SB	4
6	1	Germany	Yasmin Kwadwo, Inna Weit, Tatjana Lofamakanda Pinto, Verena Sailer	43.38		3
7	2	Brazil	Vanusa dos Santos, Franciela Krasucki, Evelyn dos Santos, Rosângela Santos	43.67		2
8	7	France	Éloyse Lesueur, Céline Distel-Bonnet, Émilie Gaydu, Stella Akakpo	43.76		1
