= Athletics at the 2019 Pan American Games – Women's 100 metres =

Women's 100 metres at the 2019 Pan American Games
- Venue: Athletics Stadium
- Dates: August 6 – August 7
- Competitors: 22 from 17 nations
- Winning time: 11.17

Medalists
Gold medal	Elaine Thompson; Jamaica
Silver medal	Michelle-Lee Ahye; Trinidad and Tobago
Bronze medal	Vitória Cristina Rosa; Brazil

The women's 100 metres competition of the athletics events at the 2019 Pan American Games will take place between the 6 and 7 of August at the 2019 Pan American Games Athletics Stadium. The defending Pan American Games champion is Sherone Simpson from Jamaica.

== Summary ==
Coming out of the blocks, American collegian Twanisha Terry had the best start. It took about 5 steps before Olympic champion Elaine Thompson began to assert herself. When Thompson was rolling, nobody could stay with her. It took Michelle-Lee Ahye about 70 metres to get past Terry, 85 for Vitória Cristina Rosa to move past for bronze.

== Records ==
Prior to this competition, the existing world and Pan American Games records were as follows:

World record	Florence Griffith-Joyner (USA)	10.49	Indianapolis, United States	July 16, 1988
Pan American Games record	Barbara Pierre (USA)	10.92	Toronto, Canada	July 21, 2015

== Schedule ==
Date	Time	Round
August 6, 2019	15:00	Semifinal
August 7, 2019	16:40	Final

== Results ==
All times shown are in seconds.

KEY:	q	Fastest non-qualifiers	Q	Qualified	NR	National record	PB	Personal best	SB	Seasonal best	DQ	Disqualified

=== Semifinal ===
Qualification: First 2 in each heat (Q) and next 2 fastest (q) qualified for the final.

Wind:
Heat 1: +0.3 m/s, Heat 2: -0.4 m/s, Heat 3: -1.1 m/s

Rank	Heat	Name	Nationality	Time	Notes
1	2	Elaine Thompson	Jamaica	11.36	Q
2	1	Michelle-Lee Ahye	Trinidad and Tobago	11.37	Q
3	2	Vitória Cristina Rosa	Brazil	11.40	Q
4	3	Crystal Emmanuel	Canada	11.48	Q
5	3	Angela Tenorio	Ecuador	11.49	Q
5	2	Kelly-Ann Baptiste	Trinidad and Tobago	11.49	q
7	1	Natasha Morrison	Jamaica	11.59	Q
7	3	Twanisha Terry	United States	11.59	q
9	2	Andrea Purica	Venezuela	11.64	
10	2	Yunisleidy García	Cuba	11.66	
11	1	Leya Buchanan	Canada	11.70	
12	1	Halle Hazzard	Grenada	11.70	
13	2	Brianne Bethel	Bahamas	11.76	
14	3	Marileidy Paulino	Dominican Republic	11.84	
15	1	Franciela Krasucki	Brazil	11.87	
16	3	Tristan Evelyn	Barbados	11.89	
17	3	Brenessa Thompson	Guyana	11.96	
18	1	Maria Woodward	Argentina	12.01	
19	1	Hilary Gladden	Belize	12.19	
20	2	Ariel Jackson	Barbados	12.31	
21	3	Shenel Crooke	Saint Kitts and Nevis	12.36	
22	2	Triana Alonso	Peru	12.38	

=== Final ===
Wind: -0.6 m/s

Rank	Lane	Name	Nationality	Time	Notes
1st place, gold medalist(s)	5	Elaine Thompson	Jamaica	11.18	
2nd place, silver medalist(s)	6	Michelle-Lee Ahye	Trinidad and Tobago	11.27	
3rd place, bronze medalist(s)	4	Vitória Cristina Rosa	Brazil	11.30	
4	8	Angela Tenorio	Ecuador	11.34	
5	3	Twanisha Terry	United States	11.37	
6	9	Natasha Morrison	Jamaica	11.40	
7	7	Crystal Emmanuel	Canada	11.41	
8	2	Kelly-Ann Baptiste	Trinidad and Tobago	11.52	
