= Athletics at the 2015 Pan American Games – Women's 4 × 100 metres relay =

Women's 4 × 100 metres relay at the 2015 Pan American Games
- Venue: CIBC Pan Am and Parapan Am Athletics Stadium
- Dates: July 24 – July 25
- Competitors: 46 from 11 nations
- Winning time: 42.58

Medalists
Gold medal	Barbara Pierre; LaKeisha Lawson; Morolake Akinosun; Kaylin Whitney	United States
Silver medal	Samantha Henry-Robinson; Kerron Stewart; Schillonie Calvert; Simone Facey; Sherone Simpson	Jamaica
Bronze medal	Crystal Emmanuel; Kimberly Hyacinthe; Jellisa Westney; Khamica Bingham	Canada

The women's 4 × 100 metres relay sprint competition of the athletics events at the 2015 Pan American Games will take place between the 24 and 25 of July at the CIBC Pan Am and Parapan Am Athletics Stadium. The defending Pan American Games champions are Ana Cláudia Silva, Vanda Gomes, Franciela Krasucki and Rosângela Santos of Brazil.

== Records ==
Prior to this competition, the existing world and Pan American Games records were as follows:

World record	United States	40.82	London, United Kingdom	August 10, 2012
Pan American Games record	Jamaica	42.62	Winnipeg, Canada	July 30, 1999

== Qualification ==
Each National Olympic Committee (NOC) ranked in the world's top 16 was able to enter one team.

== Schedule ==
Date	Time	Round
July 24, 2015	19:45	Semifinals
July 25, 2015	19:40	Final

== Results ==
All times shown are in seconds.

KEY:	q	Fastest non-qualifiers	Q	Qualified	NR	National record	PB	Personal best	SB	Seasonal best	DQ	Disqualified

=== Semifinals ===
Rank	Heat	Nation	Name	Time	Notes
1	1	Jamaica	Samantha Henry-Robinson, Sherone Simpson, Schillonie Calvert, Simone Facey	42.82	Q
2	1	Canada	Crystal Emmanuel, Kimberly Hyacinthe, Jellisa Westney, Khamica Bingham	42.98	Q
3	2	United States	Barbara Pierre, LaKeisha Lawson, Morolake Akinosun, Kaylin Whitney	43.07	Q
4	1	Brazil	Vitoria Cristina Rosa, Vanusa dos Santos, Bruna Farias, Rosângela Santos	43.24	Q
5	2	Bahamas	Devynne Charlton, Tayla Carter, Sheniqua Ferguson, Adanaca Brown	44.34	Q
6	1	Venezuela	Lexabeth Hidalgo, Andrea Purica, Nediam Vargas, Wilmary Álvarez	44.36	q
7	1	Puerto Rico	Dayleen Santana, Celiangeli Morales, Beatriz Cruz, Genoiska Cancel	44.39	q
8	2	Cuba	Geylis Montes, Arialis Gandulla, Dulaimi Odelín, Belkis Milanes	44.58	Q, SB
9	2	Ecuador	Kenya Quiñónez, Narcisa Landazuri, Yuliana Angulo, Viviana de la Cruz	44.64	
10	1	Chile	Josefina Gutiérrez, Isidora Jiménez, Fernanda Mackenna, Paula Goñi	45.38	
	2	Trinidad and Tobago	Kamaria Durant, Kelly-Ann Baptiste, Semoy Hackett, Reyare Thomas	DNF	

=== Final ===
Rank	Nation	Name	Time	Notes
1st place, gold medalist(s)	United States	Barbara Pierre, LaKeisha Lawson, Morolake Akinosun, Kaylin Whitney	42.58	PR
2nd place, silver medalist(s)	Jamaica	Samantha Henry-Robinson, Kerron Stewart, Schillonie Calvert, Simone Facey	42.68	
3rd place, bronze medalist(s)	Canada	Crystal Emmanuel, Kimberly Hyacinthe, Jellisa Westney, Khamica Bingham	43.00	
4	Brazil	Vitoria Cristina Rosa, Vanusa dos Santos, Bruna Farias, Rosângela Santos	43.01	
5	Venezuela	Wilmary Álvarez, Andrea Purica, Nediam Vargas, Nercely Soto	44.13	SB
6	Puerto Rico	Dayleen Santana, Celiangeli Morales, Beatriz Cruz, Genoiska Cancel	44.27	
7	Bahamas	Devynne Charlton, Sheniqua Ferguson, Tayla Carter, Adanaca Brown	44.38	
	Cuba	Belkis Milanes, Arialis Gandulla, Geylis Montes, Dulaimi Odelín	DNF	
