= Athletics at the 2015 Pan American Games – Women's 100 metres =

Women's 100 metres at the 2015 Pan American Games
- Venue: CIBC Pan Am and Parapan Am Athletics Stadium
- Dates: July 21 – July 22
- Competitors: 23 from 14 nations
- Winning time: 10.95

Medalists
Gold medal	Sherone Simpson	Jamaica
Silver medal	Ángela Tenorio	Ecuador
Bronze medal	Barbara Pierre	United States

The women's 100 metres sprint competition of the athletics events at the 2015 Pan American Games took place between the 21 and 22 of July at the CIBC Pan Am and Parapan Am Athletics Stadium in Toronto, Canada. The defending Pan American Games champion was Rosângela Santos of Brazil.

== Records ==
Prior to this competition, the existing world and Pan American Games records were as follows:

World record	Florence Griffith-Joyner (USA)	10.49	Indianapolis, United States	16 July 1988
Pan American Games record	Mikele Barber (USA)	11.02	Rio de Janeiro, Brazil	2007

== Qualification ==
Each National Olympic Committee (NOC) was able to enter up to two entrants providing they had met the minimum standard (11.55) in the qualifying period (January 1, 2014 to June 28, 2015).

== Schedule ==
Date	Time	Round
July 21, 2015	10:30	Heats
July 22, 2015	18:25	Semifinals
July 22, 2015	20:30	Final

== Results ==
All times shown are in seconds.

KEY:	q	Fastest non-qualifiers	Q	Qualified	NR	National record	PB	Personal best	SB	Seasonal best	DQ	Disqualified

=== Heats ===
Rank	Heat	Name	Nationality	Time	Wind	Notes
1	2	Barbara Pierre	United States	10.92	+1.6	Q, GR, PR
2	3	Ana Cláudia Lemos	Brazil	10.96	+4.0	Q
3	3	Khamica Bingham	Canada	11.00	+4.0	Q
4	1	Kelly-Ann Baptiste	Trinidad and Tobago	11.07	+3.0	Q
5	2	Rosângela Santos	Brazil	11.08	+1.6	Q
6	3	Morolake Akinosun	United States	11.12	+4.0	Q
7	3	LaVerne Jones-Ferrette	Virgin Islands	11.14	+4.0	Q
8	1	Ángela Tenorio	Ecuador	11.17	+3.0	Q
8	2	Semoy Hackett	Trinidad and Tobago	11.17	+1.6	Q, SB
10	3	Sherone Simpson	Jamaica	11.18	+4.0	q
11	2	Tahesia Harrigan-Scott	British Virgin Islands	11.19	+1.6	Q
12	1	Schillonie Calvert	Jamaica	11.27	+3.0	Q
13	2	Isidora Jiménez	Chile	11.33	+1.6	q, NR
13	3	Narcisa Landazuri	Ecuador	11.33	+4.0	q
15	1	Arialis Gandulla	Cuba	11.37	+3.0	Q
16	1	Crystal Emmanuel	Canada	11.41	+3.0	q
17	3	Nediam Vargas	Venezuela	11.43	+4.0	
18	3	Shenel Crooke	Saint Kitts and Nevis	11.43	+4.0	
19	2	Dulaimi Odelin	Cuba	11.44	+1.6	PB
20	2	Sharolyn Josephs	Costa Rica	11.46	+1.6	PB
21	1	Andrea Purica	Venezuela	11.53	+3.0	
22	2	Marecia Pemberton	Saint Kitts and Nevis	11.68	+1.6	
23	1	Kaina Martinez	Belize	11.69	+3.0	

=== Semifinals ===
Rank	Heat	Name	Nationality	Time	Wind	Notes
1	2	Barbara Pierre	United States	10.96	+2.2	Q
2	2	Rosângela Santos	Brazil	11.01	+2.2	Q
3	2	Sherone Simpson	Jamaica	11.02	+2.2	Q
4	1	Kelly-Ann Baptiste	Trinidad and Tobago	11.05	+2.5	Q
5	1	Ángela Tenorio	Ecuador	11.10	+2.5	Q
6	1	Ana Cláudia Lemos	Brazil	11.13	+2.5	Q
7	2	Khamica Bingham	Canada	11.14	+2.2	q
8	2	Semoy Hackett	Trinidad and Tobago	11.16	+2.2	q
9	1	Tahesia Harrigan-Scott	British Virgin Islands	11.18	+2.5	
10	1	Crystal Emmanuel	Canada	11.26	+2.5	
11	1	Schillonie Calvert	Jamaica	11.29	+2.5	
11	1	Morolake Akinosun	United States	11.29	+2.5	
13	1	LaVerne Jones-Ferrette	Virgin Islands	11.33	+2.5	
14	2	Narcisa Landazuri	Ecuador	11.34	+2.2	
15	2	Arialis Gandulla	Cuba	11.36	+2.2	
16	2	Isidora Jiménez	Chile	11.37	+2.2	

=== Final ===
Wind: +0.9

Rank	Lane	Name	Nationality	Time	Notes
1st place, gold medalist(s)	8	Sherone Simpson	Jamaica	10.95	SB
2nd place, silver medalist(s)	5	Ángela Tenorio	Ecuador	10.99	AR
3rd place, bronze medalist(s)	3	Barbara Pierre	United States	11.01	
4	4	Rosângela Santos	Brazil	11.04	
5	6	Kelly-Ann Baptiste	Trinidad and Tobago	11.05	
6	2	Khamica Bingham	Canada	11.13	PB
7	7	Ana Cláudia Lemos	Brazil	11.15	
8	1	Semoy Hackett	Trinidad and Tobago	11.16	SB
