= Bruna Farias =

Brazilian sprinter (born 1992)

Personal information
- Born: 19 May 1992 (age 33) Maceió, Brazil
- Height: 1.56 m (5 ft 1 in)
- Weight: 51 kg (112 lb)

Sport
- Sport: Track and field
- Event(s): 100 metres, 4 × 100m relay

Bruna Jessica Oliveira Farias (born 19 May 1992) is a Brazilian sprinter. She competed in the 4 × 100 metres relay at the 2015 World Championships in Athletics in Beijing but did not make the final. She competed at the 2020 Summer Olympics.

== Competition record ==
Year	Competition	Venue	Position	Event	Notes
Representing Brazil
2014	South American U23 Championships	Montevideo, Uruguay	2nd	100 m	11.52
2014	South American U23 Championships	Montevideo, Uruguay	1st	200 m	23.61
2014	South American U23 Championships	Montevideo, Uruguay	1st	4 × 100 m relay	45.44
2015	South American Championships	Lima, Peru	2nd	4 × 100 m relay	44.43
2015	Pan American Games	Toronto, Canada	4th	4 × 100 m relay	43.01
2015	World Championships	Beijing, China	9th (h)	4 × 100 m relay	43.15
2016	Ibero-American Championships	Rio de Janeiro, Brazil	5th	100 m	11.46
2016	Ibero-American Championships	Rio de Janeiro, Brazil	2nd	4 × 100 m relay	43.68
2016	Olympic Games	Rio de Janeiro, Brazil	–	4 × 100 m relay	DQ
2017	IAAF World Relays	Nassau, Bahamas	8th (h)	4 × 100 m relay	44.20^{1}
2019	South American Championships	Lima, Peru	1st	4 × 100 m relay	44.70
2019	World Championships	Doha, Qatar	–	4 × 100 m relay	DQ
2021	Olympic Games	Tokyo, Japan	11th (h)	4 × 100 m relay	43.15

^{1}Did not finish in the final

== Personal bests ==
Outdoors

- 100 metres – 11.38 (+0.7 m/s, São Paulo 2021)
- 100 metres – 11.29 (+4.6 m/s, São Paulo 2021)
- 200 metres – 23.32 (+1.1 m/s, Sao Bernardo do Campo 2016)

Indoors

- 60 metres – 7.42 (Sao Caetano do Sul 2014)
