= Andrea Purica =

Venezuelan sprinter (born 1995)

Personal information
- Born: 21 November 1995 (age 29)
- Height: 1.77 m (5 ft 10 in)
- Weight: 68 kg (150 lb)

Sport
- Sport: Athletics
- Event: 100 metres

Andrea Michelle Purica Guevara (born 21 November 1995) is a Venezuelan sprinter. She competed in the 100 metres event at the 2015 World Championships in Athletics in Beijing, China.

== Competition record ==
Year	Competition	Venue	Position	Event	Notes
Representing Venezuela
2013	Bolivarian Games	Trujillo, Peru	6th	100 m	11.98
2014	IAAF World Relays	Nassau, Bahamas	17th (h)	4 × 100 m relay	44.64
2014	World Junior Championships	Eugene, United States	8th	100 m	11.76
2014	South American U23 Championships	Montevideo, Uruguay	1st	100 m	11.50
2014	South American U23 Championships	Montevideo, Uruguay	5th	200 m	24.13
2014	South American U23 Championships	Montevideo, Uruguay	2nd	4 × 100 m relay	46.50
2014	Central American and Caribbean Games	Xalapa, Mexico	1st	100 m	11.29
2014	Central American and Caribbean Games	Xalapa, Mexico	1st	4 × 100 m relay	43.53
2015	IAAF World Relays	Nassau, Bahamas	3rd (B)	4 × 100 m relay	44.17
2015	Pan American Games	Toronto, Canada	21st (h)	100 m	11.53 (w)
2015	Pan American Games	Toronto, Canada	5th	4 × 100 m relay	44.13
2015	World Championships	Beijing, China	42nd (h)	100 m	11.62
2016	Ibero-American Championships	Rio de Janeiro, Brazil	11th (h)	100 m	11.64
2016	Ibero-American Championships	Rio de Janeiro, Brazil	3rd	4 × 100 m relay	43.94
2017	South American Championships	Asunción, Paraguay	3rd	100 m	11.18 (w)
2017	South American Championships	Asunción, Paraguay	–	4 × 100 m relay	DNF
2017	World Championships	London, United Kingdom	29th (h)	100 m	11.43
2017	Bolivarian Games	Santa Marta, Colombia	3rd	100 m	11.53
2017	Bolivarian Games	Santa Marta, Colombia	1st	4 × 100 m relay	44.15
2018	World Indoor Championships	Birmingham, United Kingdom	30th (h)	60 m	7.36
2018	South American Games	Cochabamba, Bolivia	4th	100 m	11.26
2018	South American Games	Cochabamba, Bolivia	1st	4 × 100 m relay	44.71
2018	Central American and Caribbean Games	Barranquilla, Colombia	3rd	100 m	11.32
2018	Central American and Caribbean Games	Barranquilla, Colombia	6th	4 × 100 m relay	45.71
2019	South American Championships	Lima, Peru	2nd	100 m	11.32
2019	South American Championships	Lima, Peru	2nd	200 m	23.37
2019	Pan American Games	Lima, Peru	9th (h)	100 m	11.64
2019	Pan American Games	Lima, Peru	6th	4 × 100 m relay	44.73
2019	World Championships	Doha, Qatar	42nd (h)	100 m	11.96

== Personal bests ==
Outdoor

- 100 metres – 11.29 (+1.5 m/s, Xalapa 2014)
- 200 metres – 24.13 (+0.4 m/s, Montevideo 2014)

Indoor

- 60 metres – 7.20 (ostrava- República Checa 2019)
