= Nediam Vargas =

Venezuelan sprinter (born 1994)

Personal information
- Full name: Nediam Nori Vargas Arteaga
- Nickname: NediamV
- Born: 5 September 1994 (age 31) Venezuela
- Height: 1.70 m (5 ft 7 in)
- Weight: 60 kg (132 lb)

Sport
- Sport: Athletics
- Event(s): 100 m, 200 m
- Updated on 29 August 2015

Nediam Nori Vargas Arteaga (born 5 September 1994) is a Venezuelan sprinter. She competed in the 100 metres at the 2015 World Championships in Beijing without advancing from the first round.

She was the 2015 South American champion at 100 metres.

== Competition record ==
Year	Competition	Venue	Position	Event	Notes
Representing Venezuela
2011	World Youth Championships	Lille, France	28th (h)	100 m	12.27
2014	IAAF World Relays	Nassau, Bahamas	17th (h)	4 × 100 m relay	44.64
2014	South American U23 Championships	Montevideo, Uruguay	4th	100 m	11.79
2014	South American U23 Championships	Montevideo, Uruguay	4th	200 m	23.84
2014	South American U23 Championships	Montevideo, Uruguay	2nd	4 × 100 m relay	46.50
2014	Central American and Caribbean Games	Xalapa, Mexico	2nd	100 m	11.43
2014	Central American and Caribbean Games	Xalapa, Mexico	6th	100 m	24.00
2014	Central American and Caribbean Games	Xalapa, Mexico	1st	4 × 100 m relay	43.53
2015	IAAF World Relays	Nassau, Bahamas	3rd (B)	4 × 100 m relay	44.17
2015	IAAF World Relays	Nassau, Bahamas	15th (h)	4 × 400 m relay	3:40.54
2015	South American Championships	Lima, Peru	1st	100 m	11.45
2015	South American Championships	Lima, Peru	3rd	200 m	23.60
2015	South American Championships	Lima, Peru	1st	4 × 100 m relay	44.28
2015	Pan American Games	Toronto, Ontario, Canada	17th (h)	100 m	11.43 (w)
2015	Pan American Games	Toronto, Ontario, Canada	17th (h)	200 m	23.65
2015	Pan American Games	Toronto, Ontario, Canada	5th	4 × 100 m relay	44.13
2015	World Championships	Beijing, China	39th (h)	100 m	11.51 (w)
2017	South American Championships	Asunción, Paraguay	5th	100 m	11.34 (w)
2017	South American Championships	Asunción, Paraguay	3rd	200 m	22.95 (w)
2017	South American Championships	Asunción, Paraguay	–	4 × 100 m relay	DNF
2017	World Championships	London, United Kingdom	44th (h)	100 m	24.35
2017	Bolivarian Games	Santa Marta, Colombia	7th	100 m	11.90
2017	Bolivarian Games	Santa Marta, Colombia	5th	200 m	24.42
2017	Bolivarian Games	Santa Marta, Colombia	1st	4 × 100 m relay	44.15
2018	Central American and Caribbean Games	Barranquilla, Colombia	20th (h)	100 m	12.51
2019	Pan American Games	Lima, Peru	6th	4 × 100 m relay	44.73

== Personal bests ==
Outdoor

- 100 metres – 11.35 (0.5 m/s, Salamanca - España 2017)
- 200 metres – 23.07 (0.2 m/s, Ciudad Real - España 2017)

Indoor

- 60 metres – 7.58 (Braga 2016)
