= Alejandro Peirano =

Chilean middle-distance runner

Personal information
- Full name: Alejandro Francesco Peirano López
- Born: 11 March 1993 (age 33)
- Education: Pontifical Catholic University of Valparaíso
- Height: 1.95 m (6 ft 5 in)
- Weight: 78 kg (172 lb)

Sport
- Sport: Athletics
- Event: 800 metres

Alejandro Francesco Peirano López (born 11 March 1993) is a Chilean middle-distance runner competing primarily in the 800 metres. He won a bronze medal at the 2018 Ibero-American Championships.

== International competitions ==
Year	Competition	Venue	Position	Event	Notes
Representing Chile
2010	Youth Olympic Games	Singapore	4th (B)	1000 m	2:28.58
2010	South American Youth Championships	Santiago, Chile	3rd	800 m	1:53.8
2011	South American Junior Championships	Medellín, Colombia	7th	400 m	51.59
2011	South American Junior Championships	Medellín, Colombia	6th	800 m	1:51.64
2011	South American Junior Championships	Medellín, Colombia	3rd	4 × 400 m relay	3:18.69
2012	World Junior Championships	Barcelona, Spain	34th (h)	800 m	1:51.45
2012	South American U23 Championships	São Paulo, Brazil	6th	400 m hurdles	53.44
2012	South American U23 Championships	São Paulo, Brazil	5th	4 × 400 m relay	3:18.09
2013	Universiade	Kazan, Russia	10th (sf)	800 m	1:49.19
2014	South American Games	Santiago, Chile	6th	800 m	1:50.43
2014	South American U23 Championships	Montevideo, Uruguay	8th	800 m	1:55.55
2014	South American U23 Championships	Montevideo, Uruguay	2nd	4 × 400 m relay	3:11.93
2015	South American Championships	Lima, Peru	5th	800 m	1:49.27
2018	Ibero-American Championships	Trujillo, Peru	3rd	800 m	1:48.62
2018	Ibero-American Championships	Trujillo, Peru	1st	4 × 400 m relay	3:10.77
2019	South American Championships	Lima, Peru	4th	800 m	1:48.36
2019	South American Championships	Lima, Peru	3rd	4 × 400 m relay	3:11.84
2019	Pan American Games	Lima, Peru	8th (h)	800 m	1:49.99^{1}

^{1}Did not finish in the final

== Personal bests ==
Outdoor

- 400 metres – 47.70 (Santiago 2018)
- 800 metres – 1:48.62 (Trujillo 2018)
