= Ángela Tenorio =

Ecuadorian sprinter (born 1996)

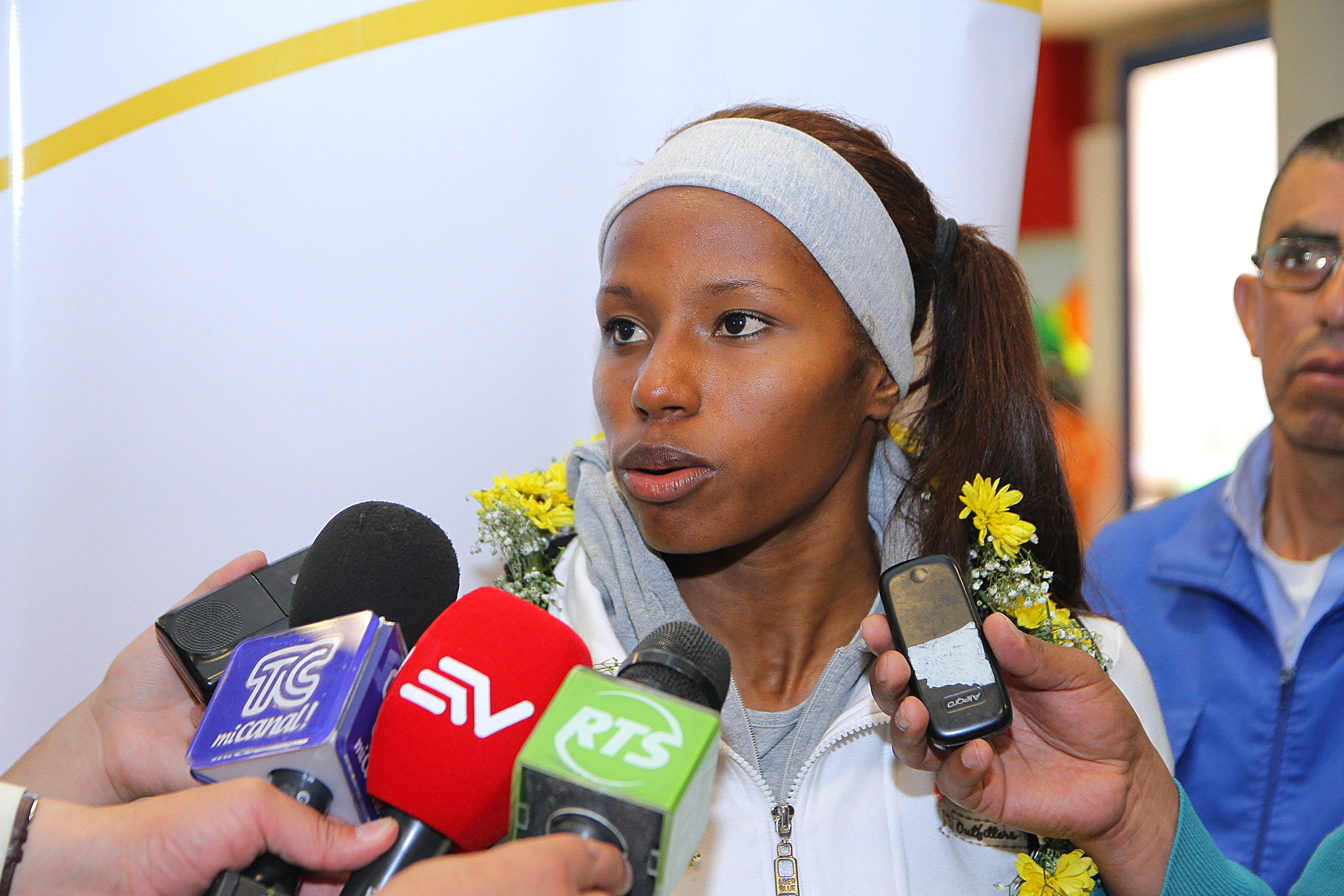

Personal information
- Full name: Ángela Gabriela Tenorio Micolta
- Nickname: La Gacela
- Born: January 27, 1996 (age 30) Lago Agrio, Sucumbíos, Ecuador
- Height: 1.66 m (5 ft 5 in)
- Weight: 55 kg (121 lb)
- Website: http://lateralse.com

Sport
- Country: Ecuador
- Sport: Athletics
- Event: Sprinting

Achievements and titles
- Personal best: 10.99sec in 100m at Panamerican Games Toronto 2015
Medal record
Women's athletics
Representing Ecuador
Continental Cup
Gold medal – first place	2018 Ostrava	4x100 m relay
Pan American Games
Silver medal – second place	2015 Toronto	100 m
- Updated on 25 January 2015

Ángela Gabriela Tenorio Micolta (born 27 January 1996 in) is an Ecuadorian athlete specialising in the sprinting events. She won two medals at the 2014 World Junior Championships. Earlier she competed at the 2013 World Championships in the 100 metres without qualifying for the semifinals. In addition, she has won multiple medals on regional level.

== Competition record ==
Year	Competition	Venue	Position	Event	Notes
Representing Ecuador
2012	Ibero-American Championships	Barquisimeto, Venezuela	10th (h)	400 m	59.20
2012	Ibero-American Championships	Barquisimeto, Venezuela	6th	4 × 100 m relay	46.58
2012	Ibero-American Championships	Barquisimeto, Venezuela	6th	4 × 400 m relay	3:50.37
2013	World Youth Championships	Donetsk, Ukraine	3rd	100 m	11.41
2013	World Youth Championships	Donetsk, Ukraine	2nd	200 m	23.13
2013	World Championships	Moscow, Russia	29th (h)	100 m	11.53
2013	Pan American Junior Championships	Medellín, Colombia	3rd	100 m	11.37 (w)
2013	Pan American Junior Championships	Medellín, Colombia	2nd	200 m	23.34
2013	South American Junior Championships	Resistencia, Argentina	1st	100 m	11.24 (w)
2013	South American Junior Championships	Resistencia, Argentina	1st	200 m	23.35 (w)
2013	South American Junior Championships	Resistencia, Argentina	1st	4 × 100 m relay	45.53
2013	Bolivarian Games	Trujillo, Peru	1st	100 m	11.47
2013	Bolivarian Games	Trujillo, Peru	3rd	200 m	11.47
2013	Bolivarian Games	Trujillo, Peru	3rd	4 × 100 m relay	44.29
2014	South American Games	Santiago, Chile	2nd	100 m	11.64
2014	South American Games	Santiago, Chile	2nd	200 m	23.66
2014	South American Games	Santiago, Chile	4th	4 × 100 m relay	45.43
2014	World Junior Championships	Eugene, United States	2nd	100 m	11.39
2014	World Junior Championships	Eugene, United States	3rd	200 m	23.15
2014	Pan American Sports Festival	Mexico City, Mexico	1st	100m	11.48 A (-2.5 m/s)
2014	Pan American Sports Festival	Mexico City, Mexico	1st	200m	22.82 w A (+2.1 m/s)
2014	South American U23 Championships	Montevideo, Uruguay	4th	4 × 100 m relay	47.81
2016	World Indoor Championships	Portland, United States	12th (sf)	60 m	7.21
2016	Ibero-American Championships	Rio de Janeiro, Brazil	2nd	100 m	11.29
2016	Ibero-American Championships	Rio de Janeiro, Brazil	2nd	200 m	23.13
2016	Olympic Games	Rio de Janeiro, Brazil	13th (sf)	100 m	11.14
2016	Olympic Games	Rio de Janeiro, Brazil	21st (sf)	200 m	22.99
2017	World Relays	Nassau, Bahamas	1st (B)	4 × 100 m relay	44.26
2017	South American Championships	Asunción, Paraguay	1st	100 m	11.02 (w)
2017	South American Championships	Asunción, Paraguay	2nd	200 m	22.90 (w)
2017	South American Championships	Asunción, Paraguay	3rd	4 × 100 m relay	44.53
2017	World Championships	London, United Kingdom	25th (h)	100 m	11.33
2017	World Championships	London, United Kingdom	12th (h)	4 × 100 m relay	43.94
2017	Bolivarian Games	Santa Marta, Colombia	1st	100 m	11.26
2017	Bolivarian Games	Santa Marta, Colombia	2nd	200 m	23.63
2017	Bolivarian Games	Santa Marta, Colombia	2nd	4 × 100 m relay	45.15
2018	South American Games	Cochabamba, Bolivia	2nd	100 m	11.13
2018	South American Games	Cochabamba, Bolivia	2nd	200 m	23.07
2018	Ibero-American Championships	Trujillo, Peru	2nd	100 m	11.36
2018	Ibero-American Championships	Trujillo, Peru	2nd	4 × 100 m relay	46.94
2018	South American U23 Championships	Cuenca, Ecuador	1st	100 m	11.09
2018	South American U23 Championships	Cuenca, Ecuador	1st	4 × 100 m relay	44.18
2019	World Relays	Yokohama, Japan	16th (h)	4 × 100 m relay	44.74
2019	World Relays	Yokohama, Japan	6th	4 × 200 m relay	1:35.91
2019	Pan American Games	Lima, Peru	4th	100 m	11.34
2019	Pan American Games	Lima, Peru	6th	200 m	23.08
2019	Pan American Games	Lima, Peru	–	4 × 100 m relay	DQ
2019	World Championships	Doha, Qatar	32nd (h)	100 m	11.40
2021	World Relays	Chorzów, Poland	5th	4 × 100 m relay	44.43
2021	World Relays	Chorzów, Poland	3rd	4 × 200 m relay	1:36.86
2021	Olympic Games	Tokyo, Japan	17th (h)	100 m	13.35
2021	Olympic Games	Tokyo, Japan	16th (h)	4 × 100 m relay	43.69
2022	Ibero-American Championships	La Nucía, Spain	6th	100 m	11.53
2022	South American Games	Asunción, Paraguay	3rd	100 m	11.93
2022	South American Games	Asunción, Paraguay	–	4 × 100 m relay	DNF
2023	South American Championships	São Paulo, Brazil	2nd	100 m	11.30
2023	World Championships	Budapest, Hungary	41st (h)	100 m	11.52
2024	World Indoor Championships	Glasgow, United Kingdom	36th (h)	60 m	7.33
2024	Ibero-American Championships	Cuiabá, Brazil	3rd	100 m	11.26
2024	Ibero-American Championships	Cuiabá, Brazil	6th	4 × 100 m relay	45.47
2024	Olympic Games	Paris, France	40th (h)	100 m	11.35
2025	Bolivarian Games	Lima, Peru	2nd	100 m	11.61
2025	Bolivarian Games	Lima, Peru	5th	4 × 100 m relay	45.48
2026	Ibero-American Championships	Lima, Peru	9th (h)	100 m	11.41

== Personal bests ==
Outdoor

- 100 metres – 10.99 (+0.9 m/s) (Toronto 2015)
- 200 metres – 22.84 (-0.5 m/s) (Cuenca 2015)
- 400 metres – 54.28 (Ibarra 2014)
