= Reyare Thomas =

Trinidadian sprinter

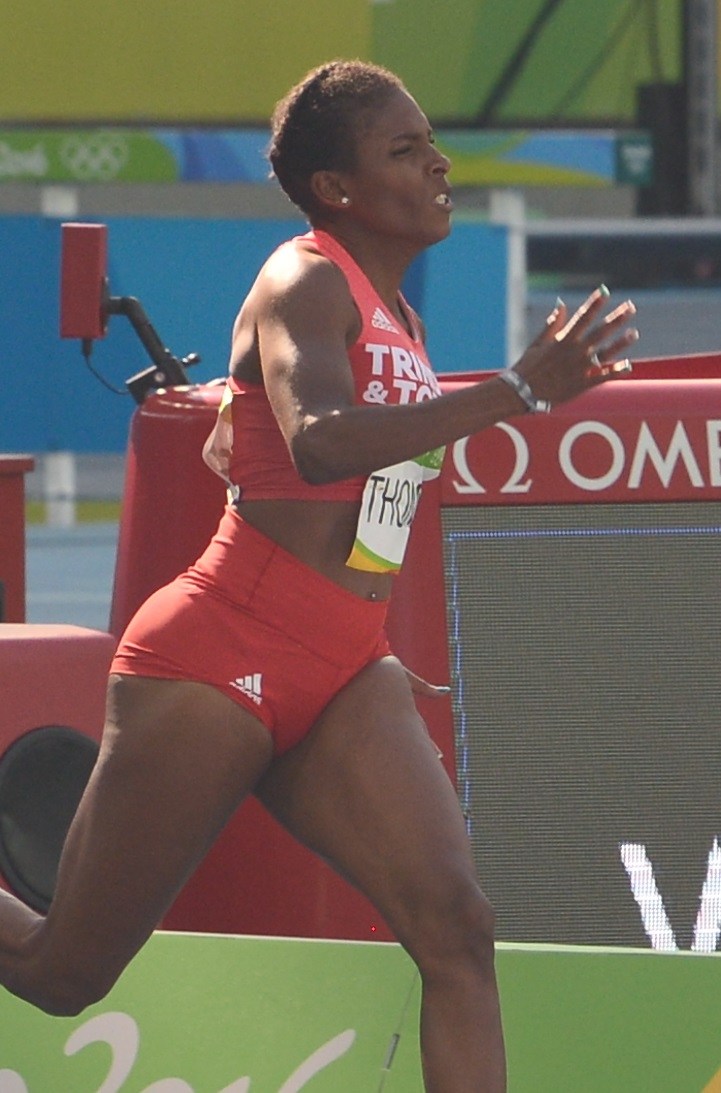
- Thomas at the 2016 Olympics

Personal information
- Born: 23 November 1987 (age 38) Chaguanas, Trinidad and Tobago
- Education: Abilene Christian University
- Height: 1.72 m (5 ft 8 in)
- Weight: 63 kg (139 lb)

Sport
- Country: Trinidad and Tobago
- Sport: Athletics
- Event(s): 100 m, 200 m
- College team: Abilene Christian Wildcats
Medal record
Representing Trinidad and Tobago
World Championships
Bronze medal – third place	2015 Beijing	4×100 m relay

Reyare Thomas (born 23 November 1987) is a Trinidadian sprinter. She competed at the 2015 World Championships in Beijing winning the bronze in the 4 × 100 metres relay and reaching the semifinals in the 200 metres.

== Biography ==
Thomas took up running in high school and started competing internationally in 2011. The same year she had a hamstring injury that put her out of training for six weeks. She studied in the United States and has degrees in social sciences from the Iowa Central Community College and Abilene Christian University. At Abilene she worked as an assistant sprints coach.

== International competitions ==
Year	Competition	Venue	Position	Event	Notes
Representing Trinidad and Tobago
2006	CARIFTA Games (U20)	Les Abymes, Guadeloupe	9th (h)	200 m	24.69
2006	CARIFTA Games (U20)	Les Abymes, Guadeloupe	3rd	4 × 100 m relay	45.72
2006	Central American and Caribbean; Junior Championships (U20)	Port of Spain, Trinidad and Tobago	3rd	4 × 100 m relay	45.75
2007	NACAC Championships	San Salvador, El Salvador	9th (h)	100 m	24.21
2007	Pan American Games	Rio de Janeiro, Brazil	17th (h)	200 m	24.10
2009	Central American and Caribbean Championships	Havana, Cuba	3rd	200 m	23.61
2009	Central American and Caribbean Championships	Havana, Cuba	3rd	4 × 100 m relay	43.75
2009	World Championships	Berlin, Germany	7th	4 × 100 m relay	43.43
2010	Central American and Caribbean Games	Mayagüez, Puerto Rico	15th (h)	100 m	12.00
2010	Central American and Caribbean Games	Mayagüez, Puerto Rico	5th	4 × 100 m relay	45.01
2013	Central American and Caribbean Championships	Morelia, Mexico	10th (h)	100 m	11.71
2013	Central American and Caribbean Championships	Morelia, Mexico	2nd	4 × 100 m relay	43.67
2013	World Championships	Moscow, Russia	9th (h)	4 × 100 m relay	43.01
2014	World Relays	Nassau, Bahamas	3rd	4 × 100 m relay	42.66
2014	World Relays	Nassau, Bahamas	–	4 × 200 m relay	DNF
2014	Commonwealth Games	Glasgow, United Kingdom	9th (sf)	200 m	23.35
2014	Commonwealth Games	Glasgow, United Kingdom	8th	4 × 100 m relay	44.78
2015	World Relays	Nassau, Bahamas	5th	4 × 100 m relay	42.88
2015	Pan American Games	Toronto, Canada	7th	200 m	23.32
2015	Pan American Games	Toronto, Canada	–	4 × 100 m relay	DNF
2015	NACAC Championships	San José, Costa Rica	8th	100 m	11.54
2015	NACAC Championships	San José, Costa Rica	3rd	4 × 100 m relay	44.24
2015	World Championships	Beijing, China	18th (sf)	200 m	23.03
2015	World Championships	Beijing, China	3rd	4 × 100 m relay	42.03
2016	Olympic Games	Rio de Janeiro, Brazil	27th (h)	200 m	22.97
2017	World Relays	Nassau, Bahamas	4th	4 × 200 m relay	1:32.63
2018	Commonwealth Games	Gold Coast, Australia	7th	100 m	11.51
2018	Commonwealth Games	Gold Coast, Australia	4th	4 × 100 m relay	43.50
2018	Central American and Caribbean Games	Barranquilla, Colombia	2nd	4 × 100 m relay	43.61
2018	NACAC Championships	Toronto, Canada	8th	200 m	23.73
2019	World Relays	Yokohama, Japan	7th (h)	4 × 100 m relay	43.67
2019	World Championships	Doha, Qatar	5th (h)	4 × 100 m relay	42.75
2022	NACAC Championships	Freeport, Bahamas	7th (h)	200 m	24.00^{1}
2022	NACAC Championships	Freeport, Bahamas	4th	4 × 100 m relay	43.81
2023	Central American and Caribbean Games	San Salvador, El Salvador	2nd	4 × 100 m relay	43.43
2023	World Championships	Budapest, Hungary	10th (h)	4 × 100 m relay	42.85
2023	Pan American Games	Santiago, Chile	5th	200 m	23.79

^{1}Did not finish in the final

== Personal bests ==
Outdoor

- 100 metres – 11.22 (+1.4 m/s, Port of Spain 2015)
- 200 metres – 22.82 (+0.8 m/s, Port of Spain 2015)

Indoor

- 60 metres – 7.37 (Charleston 2012)
- 200 metres – 23.51 (Birmingham, AL 2013)
