= Alexander Russo (athlete) =

Brazilian sprinter (born 1994)

Personal information
- Nationality: Brazilian
- Born: 26 July 1994 (age 32)
- Height: 1.72 m (5 ft 7 1/2 in)
- Weight: 61 kg (134 lb)

Sport
- Sport: Track and field
- Event: 400 metres
- Coached by: Jayme Netto Jr

Achievements and titles
- Olympic finals: 8° Colocado Rio Olympic Games 2016
- Personal best: 400 m: 45.55 (2017)

Alexander Russo (born 26 July 1994) is a Brazilian track and field sprinter who competes in the 400 metres. He represented the host nation at the 2016 Rio Olympics and is Brazilian (2019) and South American (2016) Champion in the 400m dash. He holds a personal best of 45.55 seconds for the 400 m, set in 2017.

He won 400 m individual medals in age category competitions at the 2013 South American Junior Championships in Athletics and the 2014 South American Under-23 Championships in Athletics. At those events he took gold with the Brazilian 4 × 400 metres relay team. He was also a relay finalist at the 2015 Military World Games and the 2016 Summer Olympics.

== Personal bests ==
- 100 metres – 10.73 (2021)
- 200 metres – 20.92 (2019)
- 400 metres – 45.55 (2017)
- 4 × 100 metres relay – 39.47 (2017)
- 4 × 400 metres relay – 3:00.43 (2016)

All information from All-Athletics profile.

== International competitions ==
Year	Competition	Venue	Position	Event	Notes
2013	Pan American Junior Championships	Medellín, Colombia	2nd	4 × 400 m relay	3:06.94
2013	South American Junior Championships	Resistencia, Argentina	2nd	400 m	47.40
2013	South American Junior Championships	Resistencia, Argentina	1st	4 × 400 m relay	3:13.86
2014	South American U23 Championships	Montevideo, Uruguay	3rd	400 m	46.35
2014	South American U23 Championships	Montevideo, Uruguay	1st	4 × 400 m relay	3:08.95
2015	Military World Games	Mungyeong, South Korea	8th	4 × 400 m relay	3:12.96
2016	Olympic Games	Rio de Janeiro, Brazil	8th	4 × 400 m relay	3:03.28
2016	South American U23 Championships	Lima, Peru	1st	400 m	47.07
2016	South American U23 Championships	Lima, Peru	1st	4 × 400 m relay	3:13.73
2017	IAAF World Relays	Nassau, Bahamas	7th	4 × 400 m relay	3:05.96
2017	South American Championships	Asunción, Paraguay	2nd	4 × 400 m relay	3:07.32
2017	World Championships	London, United Kingdom	13th (h)	4 × 400 m relay	3:04.02
