= 2014 South American Under-23 Championships in Athletics =

VI South American Under-23 Championships in Athletics
- Dates: October 3–5
- Host city: Montevideo, Uruguay
- Venue: Pista Darwin Piñeyrúa
- Level: U-23
- Events: 44
- Participation: 310 athletes from 12 nations
- Records set: 14 championship records

The 6th South American Under-23 Championships in Athletics were held in Montevideo, Uruguay at Pista de Atletismo Darwin Piñeyrúa on October 3–5, 2014.

Sprinters Aldemir da Silva Júnior from Brazil, new 200m championship record in 20.50s, and Déborah Rodríguez from Uruguay, new 400m championship record in 52.53s, were awarded the titles for the best performances (mejor marca técnica) of the event.

== Medal summary ==
For detailed results, see footnotes The names of the Brazilian athletes in this result list were checked against a list of athletes selected for the event.

=== Men ===
Event	Gold		Silver		Bronze	
100 metres (wind: +0.3 m/s)	Andy Martínez; Peru	10.40	Aldemir da Silva Junior; Brazil	10.47	Enrique Polanco; Chile	10.53
200 metres (wind: +1.4 m/s)	Aldemir da Silva Junior; Brazil	20.50 CR	Fredy Maidana; Paraguay	20.90 NR	Diego Palomeque; Colombia	21.02
400 metres	José Meléndez; Venezuela	46.05	Bernardo Baloyes; Colombia	46.11	Alexander Russo; Brazil	46.35
800 metres	Joseilton Cunha; Brazil	1:48.47	Lucas Gabriel Rodrigues; Brazil	1:49.37	Lucirio Antonio Garrido; Venezuela	1:50.87
1500 metres	Carlos Díaz; Chile	3:44.52 CR	Javier Marmo; Uruguay	3:47.47	Kevin Angulo; Ecuador	3:47.82
5000 metres	Matías Silva; Chile	13:57.58 CR	José Luis Rojas; Peru	14:02.37	Yerson Orellana; Peru	14:04.30
10,000 metres	Matías Silva; Chile	30:13.81	Daniel Toroya; Bolivia	30:16.50	Ariel Méndez; Chile	30:19.61
110 metres hurdles (wind: +2.2 m/s)	Jonathas Brito; Brazil	13.69 w	Eduardo de Deus; Brazil	13.85 w	Diego Lyon; Chile	13.98 w
400 metres hurdles	Wesley Martins; Brazil	51.12	Yeferson Valencia; Colombia	51.19	Alfredo Sepúlveda; Chile	51.56
3000 metres steeplechase	Roberto Tello; Chile	8:57.49	Thiarles dos Santos; Brazil	9:02.16	Juan Medina; Chile	9:08.59
4 x 100 metres relay	Brazil; Rodrigo do Nascimento; Ricardo de Souza; Antônio César Rodrigues; Aldemir da Silva Junior	39.74	Paraguay; Cristián Leguizamón; Fredy Maidana; Jesús Cáceres; Ángel Ayala	40.88 NR	Chile; Patricio Colarte; Sergio Aldea; Sergio Germain; Enrique Polanco	41.20
4 x 400 metres relay	Brazil; Anderson Machado dos Santos; Lucas Santos; Carlos Grachet; Alexander Russo	3:08.95	Chile; Alfredo Sepúlveda; Sergio Germain; Alejandro Peirano; Sergio Aldea	3:11.93	Colombia; Diego Palomeque; Miguel Ángel Alvarado; Yeferson Valencia; Bernardo Baloyes	3:11.95
20,000 metres Track Walk	Manuel Esteban Soto; Colombia	1:23:22.7 CR	Richard Vargas; Venezuela	1:23:25.6	Kenny Martín Pérez; Colombia	1:25:08.4
High jump	Fernando Ferreira; Brazil	2.24 CR	Eure Yáñez; Venezuela	2.18	Alexander Bowen; Panama	2.15
Pole vault	José Pacho; Ecuador	5.10	Jeff Oliverio; Brazil	5.00	Walter Viáfara; Colombia	4.85
Long jump	Higor Alves; Brazil	7.60 (wind: -0.7 m/s)	Paulo Sérgio Oliveira; Brazil	7.59 (wind: -0.2 m/s)	Juan Mosquera; Panama	7.40 (wind: -0.4 m/s)
Triple jump	Kauam Bento; Brazil	15.77 w (wind: +2.8 m/s)	Álvaro Cortez; Chile	15.36 (wind: +0.8 m/s)	Mateus Adão de Sá; Brazil	15.20 (wind: -1.2 m/s)
Shot put	Willian Braido; Brazil	18.98	Willian Dourado; Brazil	17.61	Juan Caicedo; Ecuador	16.17
Discus throw	Mauricio Ortega; Colombia	60.46 CR	Felipe Lorenzon; Brazil	56.21	Mario Luis David Junior; Brazil	55.40
Hammer throw	Joaquín Gómez; Argentina	67.98 CR	Humberto Mansilla; Chile	65.27	Gabriel Kehr; Chile	63.38
Javelin throw	Braian Toledo; Argentina	77.75	Tomás Guerra; Chile	70.00	Fabián Jara; Paraguay	68.78
Decathlon	Renato dos Santos; Brazil	7025	Guillermo Ruggeri; Argentina	6887	Yuri da Silva; Brazil	6868

=== Women ===
Event	Gold		Silver		Bronze	
100 metres (wind: -1.2 m/s)	Andrea Purica; Venezuela	11.50	Bruna Farias; Brazil	11.52	Vitoria Cristina Rosa; Brazil	11.64
200 metres (wind: +0.4 m/s)	Bruna Farias; Brazil	23.61	Isidora Jiménez; Chile	23.72	Karina da Rosa; Brazil	23.72
400 metres	Déborah Rodríguez; Uruguay	52.53 CR, NR	Natallia Silva; Brazil	53.14	Leticia de Souza; Brazil	53.96
800 metres	Déborah Rodríguez; Uruguay	2:08.65	Mariana Borelli; Argentina	2:09.24	Pia Fernández; Uruguay	2:09.89
1500 metres	Flávia de Lima; Brazil	4:21.05 CR	Erika Lima; Brazil	4:23.58	Zulema Arenas; Peru	4:25.30
5000 metres	Soledad Torre; Peru	16:39.95 CR	Jovana de la Cruz; Peru	16:43.40	Giselle Álvarez; Chile	16:51.22
10000 metres	Giselle Álvarez; Chile	35:28.30	Luzmery Rojas; Peru	35:32.56	Jéssica Paguay; Ecuador	35:35.75
3000 metres steeplechase	Zulema Arenas; Peru	10:06.25 CR	Jovana de la Cruz; Peru	10:18.74	July da Silva; Brazil	10:34.62
100 metres hurdles (wind: +2.4 m/s)	Génesis Romero; Venezuela	13.51 w	Gabriela Lima; Brazil	13.81 w	María Ignacia Eguiguren; Chile	13.93 w
400 metres hurdles	Déborah Rodríguez; Uruguay	58.49	Geisa dos Santos; Brazil	59.53	Brenda da Costa; Brazil	60.86
4 x 100 metres relay	Brazil; Vitoria Cristina Rosa; Bruna Farias; Andressa Fidelis; Evelyn Oliveira de Paula	45.44	Venezuela; Johana Pirela; Andrea Purica; Génesis Romero; Nediam Vargas	46.50	Chile; Macarena Borie; Josefina Gutiérrez; María Ignacia Eguiguren; Isidora Jiménez	46.80
4 x 400 metres relay	Brazil; Jéssica Roberti da Silva; Lourdes de Souza Dallazem; Natallia da Silva; Flávia de Lima	3:42.07	Venezuela; Johana Pirela; Maryury Valdez; Odellani Monges; Nediam Vargas	3:45.89	Uruguay; Laura Lupano; Pia Fernández; Yenifer Silva; Déborah Rodríguez	3:50.35
20,000 metres Track Walk	Wendy Cornejo; Bolivia	1:37:43.1 CR	Ángela Castro; Bolivia	1:38:55.7	Yeseida Carrillo; Colombia	1:42:20.5
High jump	Tamara de Sousa; Brazil	1.82	Ana Paula de Oliveira; Brazil	1.82	Betsabé Páez; Argentina	1.76
Pole vault	Robeilys Peinado; Venezuela	3.90	Juliana Campos; Brazil	3.70	Noelina Madarieta; Argentina	3.60
Long jump	Yulimar Rojas; Venezuela	6.36 (wind: +0.8 m/s) CR	Jéssica dos Reis; Brazil	6.35 (wind: +0.7 m/s)	Juliana Angulo; Ecuador	6.16 (wind: +0.8 m/s)
Triple jump	Yulimar Rojas; Venezuela	13.35 (wind: -1.8 m/s)	Nubia Soares; Brazil	13.31 (wind: >-0.7 m/s)	Claudine de Jesus; Brazil	12.81 (wind: +0.0 m/s)
Shot put	Ivana Gallardo; Chile	16.20	Izabela da Silva; Brazil	15.95	Esthefania da Costa; Brazil	15.18
Discus throw	Izabela da Silva; Brazil	58.70 CR	Lidiane Cansian; Brazil	56.77	Ivana Gallardo; Chile	51.75
Hammer throw	Génesis Olivera; Venezuela	63.80	Mariana Marcelino; Brazil	61.18	Paola Miranda; Paraguay	57.06
Javelin throw	Edivania Araujo; Brazil	53.79	Daniella Nisimura; Brazil	53.46	Laura Paredes; Paraguay	51.19
Heptathlon	Evelis Aguilar; Colombia	5333	Fiorella Chiappe; Argentina	5207	Karen Lopes; Brazil	5075

== Medal table (unofficial) ==
The unofficial medal count is in agreement with an official publication.

* Host nation (Uruguay)

Rank	Nation	Gold	Silver	Bronze	Total
1	Brazil	18	21	12	51
2	Venezuela	7	4	1	12
3	Chile	6	5	11	22
4	Peru	3	4	2	9
5	Colombia	3	2	5	10
6	Uruguay*	3	1	2	6
7	Argentina	2	3	2	7
8	Bolivia	1	2	0	3
9	Ecuador	1	0	4	5
10	Paraguay	0	2	3	5
11	Panama	0	0	2	2
Totals (11 entries)		44	44	44	132

== Participation ==
According to an unofficial count, 310 athletes from 12 countries participated. This is in agreement with the official numbers as published.

- Argentina (42)
- Bolivia (8)
- Brazil (81)
- Chile (29)
- Colombia (17)
- Ecuador (19)
- Panama (10)
- Paraguay (16)
- Peru (23)
- Suriname (2)
- Uruguay (44)
- Venezuela (19)

== Team trophies ==
Brazil won the team trophies in all three categories.

=== Total ===
The host country is highlighted in lavender blue

Rank	Nation	Points
1st place, gold medalist(s)	Brazil	472
2nd place, silver medalist(s)	Chile	168
3rd place, bronze medalist(s)	Venezuela	145
4	Argentina	101
5	Peru	98
6	Colombia	90
7	Uruguay	68
8	Ecuador	64
9	Paraguay	43
10	Bolivia	27
11	Panama	10
12	Suriname	0

=== Male ===
The host country is highlighted in lavender blue

Rank	Nation	Points
1st place, gold medalist(s)	Brazil	242
2nd place, silver medalist(s)	Chile	116
3rd place, bronze medalist(s)	Colombia	62
4	Argentina	55
5	Venezuela	43
6	Ecuador	37
7	Peru	31
8	Paraguay	28
9	Uruguay	14
10	Bolivia	10
11	Panama	10
12	Suriname	0

=== Female ===
The host country is highlighted in lavender blue

Rank	Nation	Points
1st place, gold medalist(s)	Brazil	230
2nd place, silver medalist(s)	Venezuela	102
3rd place, bronze medalist(s)	Peru	67
9	Uruguay	54
6	Chile	52
4	Argentina	46
5	Colombia	28
7	Ecuador	27
10	Bolivia	17
8	Paraguay	15
11	Panama	0
12	Suriname	0
