= Franco García =

Argentine footballer

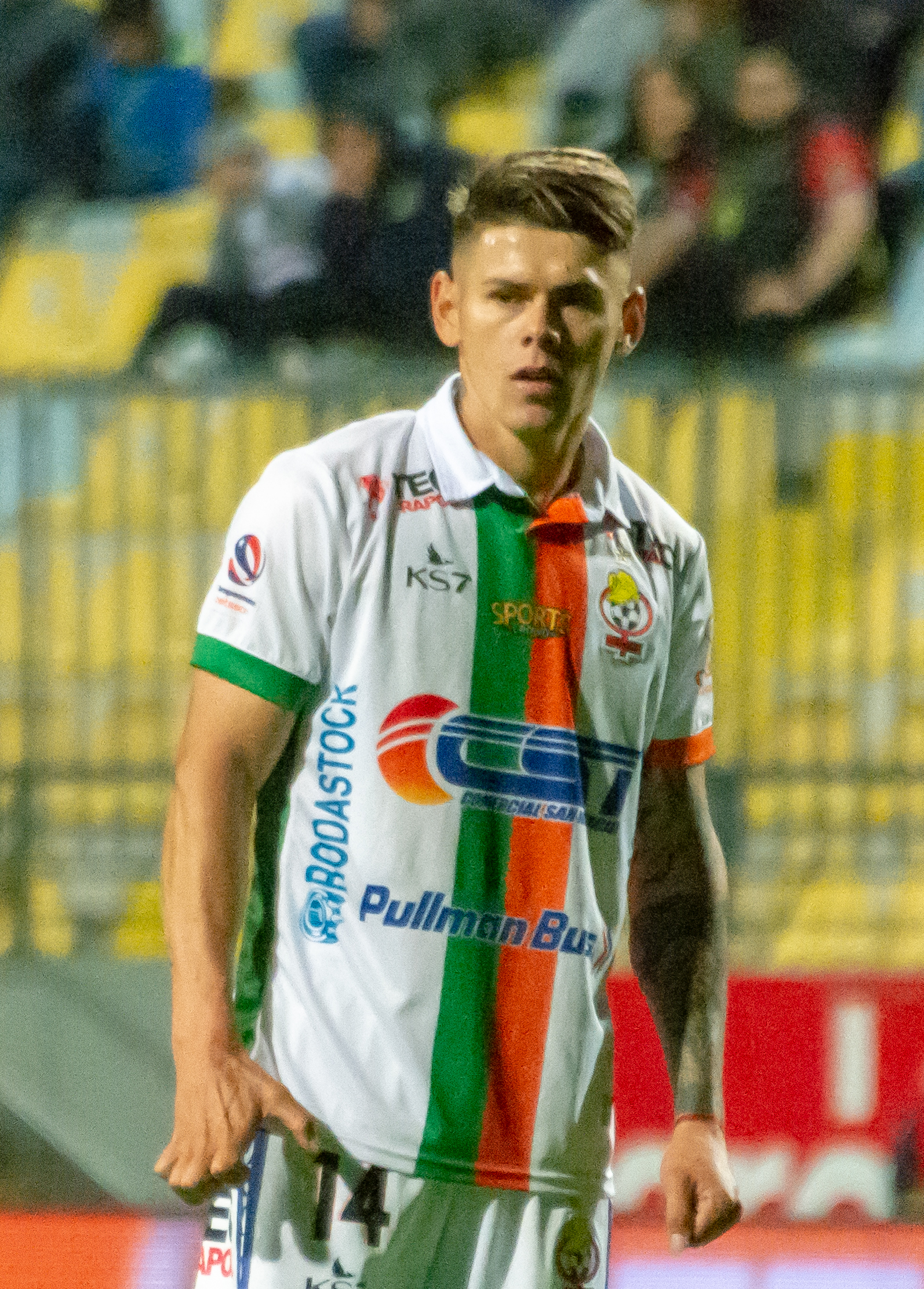
- García with Cobresal in 2023

Personal information
- Full name: Franco Emanuel García
- Date of birth: 4 June 1997 (age 29)
- Place of birth: Córdoba, Argentina
- Height: 1.72 m (5 ft 8 in)
- Position: Winger

Team information
- Current team: Colón

Youth career
- Racing de Córdoba

Senior career*
Years	Team	Apps	(Gls)
2015–2023	Racing de Córdoba	94	(13)
2020	→ Sportivo La Consulta (loan)	5	(0)
2023–2026	Cobresal	60	(7)
2025	→ San Martín Tucumán (loan)	28	(5)
2026	Newell's Old Boys	8	(1)
2026–	Colón	11	(0)
- * Club domestic league appearances and goals as of 17:44, 4 October 2026 (UTC)

Franco Emanuel García (born 4 June 1997) is an Argentine footballer who plays as a winger for Colón.

== Club career ==
Born in Córdoba, Argentina, García is a product of Racing de Córdoba, with whom he made his debut in the 2013–14 Copa Argentina against Las Palmas. From 2015 to 2022, he played for them in the Torneo Federal B, the Torneo Federal A and the Torneo Regional Federal Amateur, getting three promotions. As a member of them, he won the 2020–21 Transición of the Torneo Regional Federal and the 2022 Torneo Federal A, getting promotion to the Primera Nacional. In 2020, he also had a stint on loan with Sportivo La Consulta.

In 2023, García moved to Chile and joined Cobresal in the top division. They becoming the runner-up in the 2023 season and qualified to the 2024 Copa Libertadores. In January 2025, he was loaned out to San Martín de Tucumán for a year. After a legal dispute, Cobresal ended his contract in December 2025.

== Personal life ==
He is nicknamed Wachi.
