= Barbara Pierre =

Haitian-born American sprinter

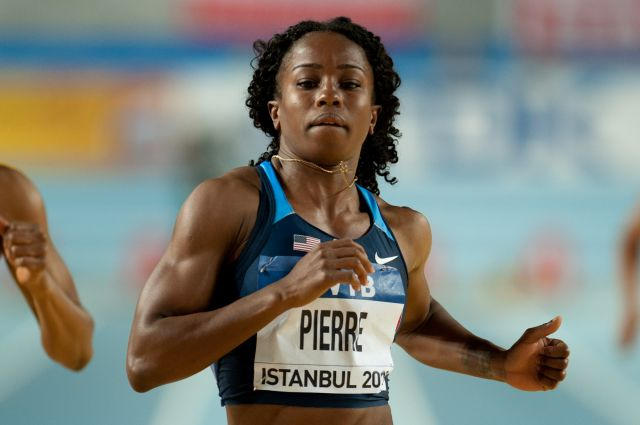
- Pierre at the 2012 World Indoor Championships in Istanbul

Personal information
- Nationality: American
- Born: April 28, 1986 (age 40)^{[nb]} Port-au-Prince, Haiti
- Home town: Clayton, NC, U.S.

Sport
- Sport: Track & Field
- Event(s): 60 meters, 100 meters
- College team: St. Augustine
Medal record
Women's track and field
Representing the United States
World Indoor Championships
Gold medal – first place	2016 Portland	60 m
Pan American Games
Gold medal – first place	2015 Toronto	4 × 100 m relay
Silver medal – second place	2011 Guadalajara	100 m
Silver medal – second place	2011 Guadalajara	4 × 100 m relay
Bronze medal – third place	2015 Toronto	100 m

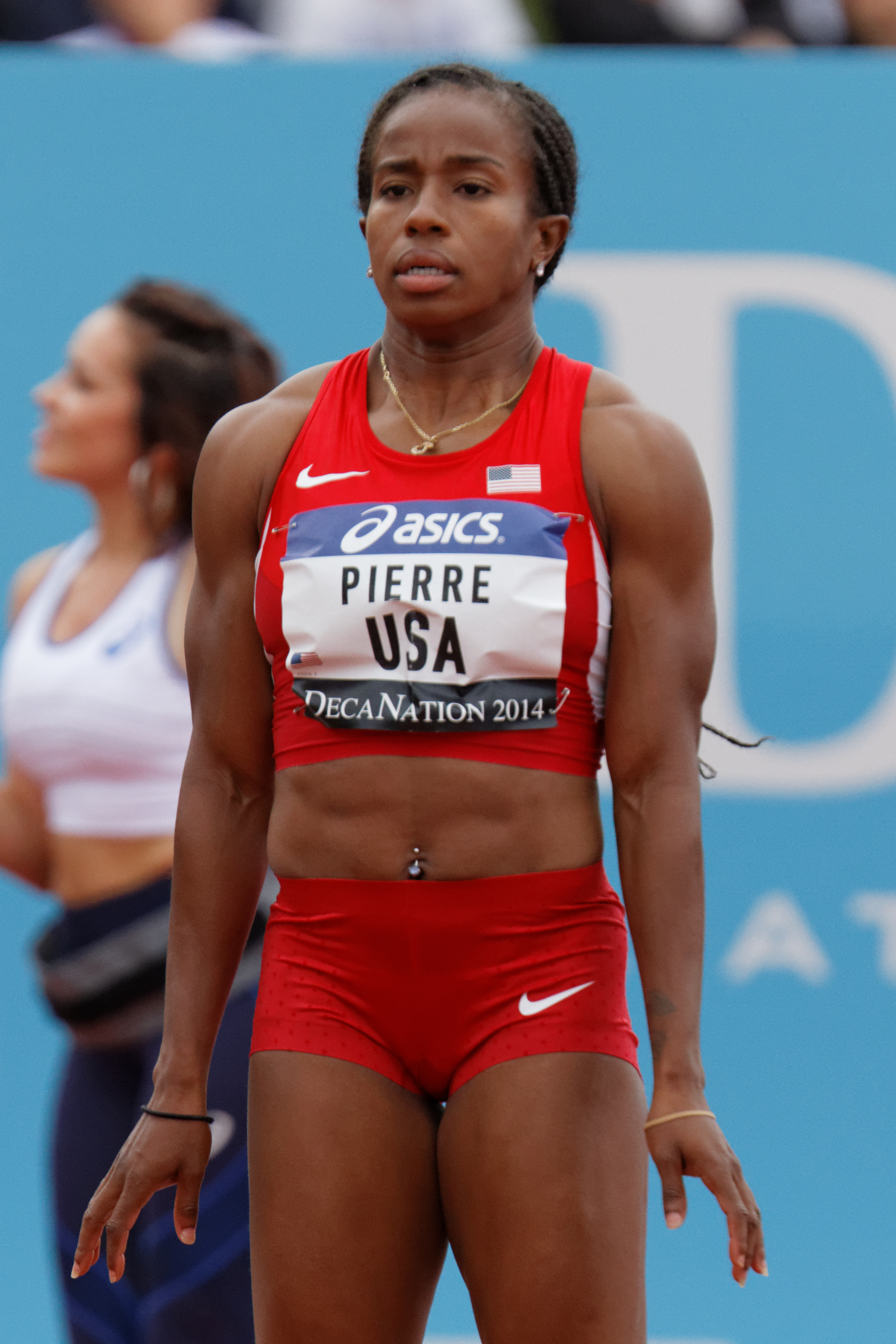
Pierre at the DécaNation in 2014

Barbara Pierre (born April 28, 1986)^{[nb]} is a Haitian-born American track and field sprint athlete who competed internationally for the United States. Her specialty is the 60-meter dash and the 100-meter dash. She had her highest world ranking in 2013, when she was the fourth fastest sprinter in the world over 100 m with her personal best of 10.85 seconds.

Pierre represented Haiti at the 2008 Summer Olympics in Beijing. She competed at the 100 m sprint and placed fourth in her first round heat, which normally meant elimination. However, her time of 11.52 was among the ten fastest losing times, resulting in a second round spot. There she failed to qualify for the semi-finals as her time of 11.56 was the fifth time of her race.

At the 2015 Pan American Games, she set the games record of 10.92 seconds in the preliminary round. In the final, she was slightly slower and went home with the bronze medal.

Pierre would continue to compete until the age of 35 when she would retire and take up coaching at her alma mater St. Augustine University as a Volunteer Assistant.

== Personal records ==
- 50-meter dash – 6.22 (2012)
- 60-meter dash – 7.00 (2016)
- 100-meter dash – 10.85 (2013)
- 200-meter dash – 23.23 (2010)
- 200-meter dash indoor – 23.62 (2010)

== Haitian national records ==
- 100-meter dash – 11.18 (2009) NR
- 60-meter dash – 7.18 (2010) NR

== International competitions ==
Representing the United States
Year	Competition	Venue	Position	Event	Notes
2008	NACAC U23 Championships	Toluca, Mexico	4th	100 m	11.45
2008	Central American and Caribbean Championships	Cali, Colombia	3rd	100 m	11.40
Representing the Republic of Haiti
2008	Olympic Games	Beijing, China	31st (qf)	100 m	11.56
Representing the United States
2011	Pan American Games	Guadalajara, Mexico	2nd	100 m	11.25
2011	Pan American Games	Guadalajara, Mexico	2nd	4 × 100 m	43.10
2012	World Indoor Championships	Istanbul, Turkey	4th	60 m	7.14
2015	Pan American Games	Toronto, Ontario, Canada	3rd	100 m	11.01
2015	Pan American Games	Toronto, Ontario, Canada	1st	4 × 100 m	42.58
2015	NACAC Championships	San José, Costa Rica	1st	100 m	(-0.1 m/s) 11.12
2015	NACAC Championships	San José, Costa Rica	1st	4 × 100 m	42.24
2016	World Indoor Championships	Portland, Oregon, United States	1st	60 m	7.02
2017	DécaNation	Angers, France	1st	100 m	11.27

== See also ==
- List of Haitian Americans

== Notes ==
- ^{nb} The IAAF lists Pierre's birth year as 1986, but other sources state the year as 1987.
