= Crystal Emmanuel-Ahye =

Canadian sprinter (born 1991)

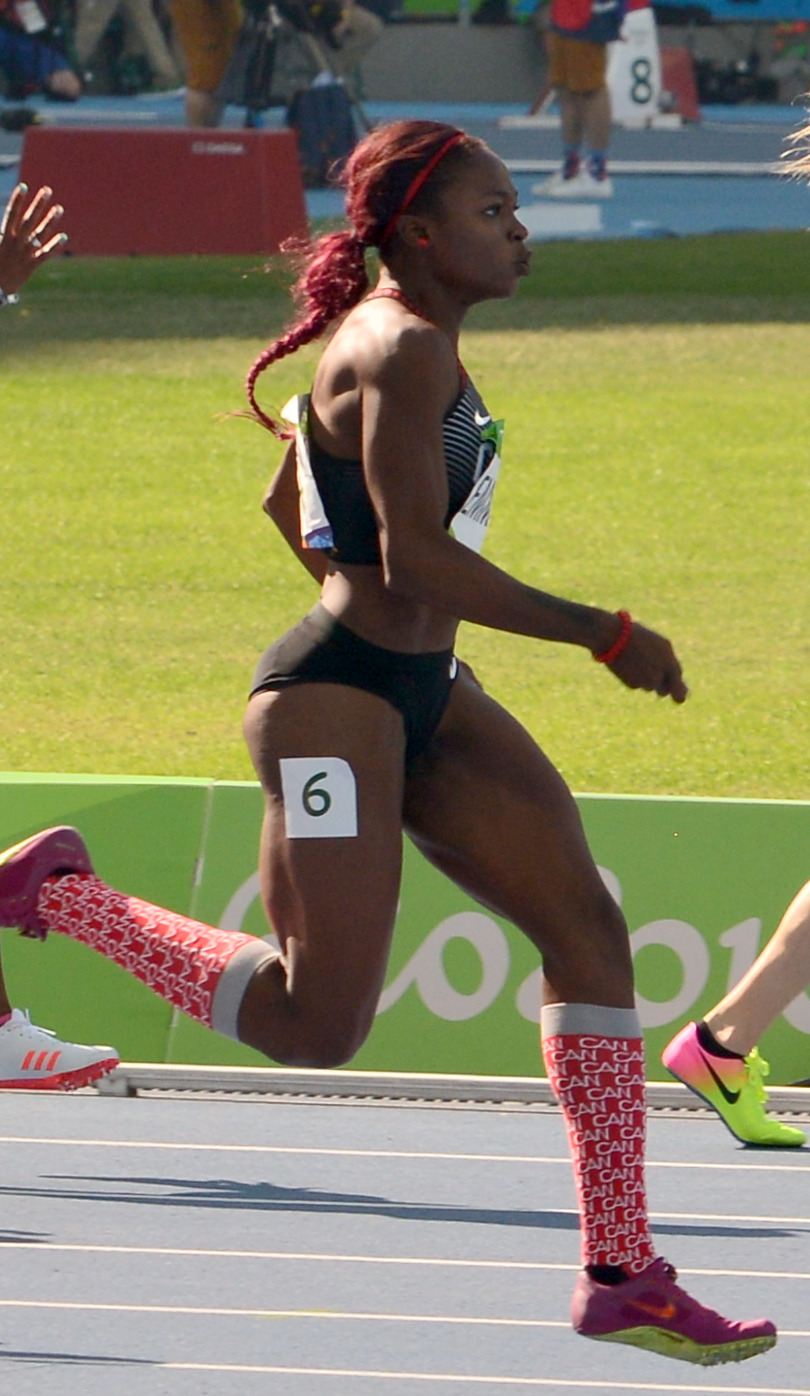
- Emmanuel-Ahye at the 2016 Olympics

Personal information
- Born: November 27, 1991 (age 34) Scarborough, Ontario, Canada
- Height: 1.70 m (5 ft 7 in)
- Weight: 59 kg (130 lb)

Sport
- Sport: Athletics
- Event(s): 100 m, 200 m
- Club: Flying Angels Track Club
- Coached by: Charles Allen
Medal record
Representing Canada
Pan American Games
Silver medal – second place	2019 Lima	4×100 m relay
Bronze medal – third place	2015 Toronto	4×100 m relay
North American, Central American and Caribbean Championships
Silver medal – second place	2018 Toronto	200 m
Bronze medal – third place	2018 Toronto	100 m
Bronze medal – third place	2018 Toronto	4×100 m relay
Jeux de la Francophonie
Gold medal – first place	2013 Nice	200 m

Crystal Emmanuel-Ahye (born November 27, 1991) is a Canadian sprinter who specialises in the 200 metres. She is the Canadian champion in both the 100 m and 200 m as of July 2018. Crystal also holds the 200 m record for Canada, having broken a record that stood for 34 years. She competed in this event at the 2012, 2016 and 2020 Summer Olympics, but was eliminated in the semi-finals. At the 2013 World Championships in Athletics, she was eliminated in the heats after being disqualified for a lane infringement.

She has also run as part of the Canadian 4 × 100 m relay team, and is part of the team that holds the Canadian record. Set at the 2015 World Championships, Emmanuel-Ahye ran the first leg of the relay. It broke the Canadian record set at the 2013 World Championships, where Emmanuel-Ahye also ran the lead off leg.

When Emmanuel-Ahye won the 100 and 200 m titles at the Canadian Championships in 2011, she was the first woman to win both events since 2003. She repeated the feat in 2016, 2017 and 2018. Her race in the 200 m final at the 2017 World Championship was the first time a Canadian woman ran in the World Championship 200 m final since 1983.

Her 100 m personal best was set at the 2018 NANAC Championships.

Her mother Rosalind Emmanuel competed internationally for Barbados in athletics in the 1980s.

She is married to Trinidadian and Tobagonian sprinter Michelle-Lee Ahye.

== Competition record ==
Year	Competition	Venue	Position	Event	Notes
Representing Canada
2009	Pan American Junior Championships	Port of Spain, Trinidad and Tobago	4th	100 m	11.59
2009	Pan American Junior Championships	Port of Spain, Trinidad and Tobago	–	4 × 100 m relay	DQ
2010	World Junior Championships	Moncton, Canada	11th (sf)	200 m	23.96
2012	NACAC U23 Championships	Irapuato, Mexico	3rd	100 m	11.43
2012	Olympic Games	London, United Kingdom	21st (sf)	200 m	23.28
2013	World Championships	Moscow, Russia	–	200 m	DQ
2013	World Championships	Moscow, Russia	6th	4 × 100 m relay	43.28
2013	Jeux de la Francophonie	Nice, France	1st	200 m	23.63
2013	Jeux de la Francophonie	Nice, France	4th	4 × 100 m relay	45.66
2014	World Relays	Nassau, Bahamas	1st (B)	4 × 100 m relay	43.33
2014	Commonwealth Games	Glasgow, United Kingdom	9th (sf)	100 m	11.43
2014	Commonwealth Games	Glasgow, United Kingdom	11th (sf)	200 m	23.46
2014	Commonwealth Games	Glasgow, United Kingdom	4th	4 × 100 m relay	43.33
2015	World Relays	Nassau, Bahamas	4th	4 × 100 m relay	42.85
2015	Pan American Games	Toronto, Ontario, Canada	10th (sf)	100 m	11.26 (w)
2015	Pan American Games	Toronto, Ontario, Canada	3rd	4 × 100 m relay	43.00
2015	World Championships	Beijing, China	27th (h)	100 m	11.33
2015	World Championships	Beijing, China	28th (h)	200 m	23.22
2015	World Championships	Beijing, China	6th	4 × 100 m relay	43.05
2016	World Indoor Championships	Portland, United States	16th (sf)	60 m	7.23
2016	Olympic Games	Rio de Janeiro, Brazil	28th (h)	100 m	11.43
2016	Olympic Games	Rio de Janeiro, Brazil	23rd (sf)	200 m	23.05
2016	Olympic Games	Rio de Janeiro, Brazil	7th	4 × 100 m relay	43.15
2017	World Relays	Nassau, Bahamas	12th (h)	4 × 100 m relay	44.98
2017	World Championships	London, United Kingdom	11th (sf)	100 m	11.14
2017	World Championships	London, United Kingdom	7th	200 m	22.60
2018	World Indoor Championships	Birmingham, United Kingdom	18th (sf)	60 m	7.27
2018	Commonwealth Games	Gold Coast, Australia	5th	200 m	22.70
2018	NACAC Championships	Toronto, Canada	3rd	100 m	11.11
2018	NACAC Championships	Toronto, Canada	3rd	4 × 100 m relay	43.50
2019	World Relays	Yokohama, Japan	–	4 × 100 m relay	DQ
2019	Pan American Games	Lima, Peru	7th	100 m	11.41
2019	Pan American Games	Lima, Peru	4th	200 m	22.89
2019	Pan American Games	Lima, Peru	2nd	4 × 100 m relay	43.37
2019	World Championships	Doha, Qatar	19th (sf)	100 m	11.29
2019	World Championships	Doha, Qatar	9th (sf)	200 m	22.65
2021	Olympic Games	Tokyo, Japan	16th (sf)	100 m	11.21
2021	Olympic Games	Tokyo, Japan	18th (sf)	200 m	23.05
2022	World Championships	Eugene, United States	39th (h)	100 m	11.48
2022	World Championships	Eugene, United States	10th (h)	4 × 100 m relay	43.09
2022	NACAC Championships	Freeport, Bahamas	6th	100 m	11.25

== Personal bests ==
Outdoor

- 100 metres – 11.11 (+0.9 m/s, Toronto 2018)
- 200 metres – 22.50 (+0.0 m/s, Cork 2017) NR

Indoor

- 60 metres – 7.23 (New York 2016)
- 200 metres – 23.42 (New York 2020)
