= Khamica Bingham =

Canadian track and field athlete

Personal information
- Born: June 15, 1994 (age 32) North York, Ontario, Canada
- Height: 160 cm (5 ft 3 in)
- Weight: 61 kg (134 lb)
Medal record
Women's athletics
Representing Canada
Pan American Games
| Silver medal – second place | 2019 Lima | 4×100 m relay |
| Bronze medal – third place | 2015 Toronto | 4×100 m relay |
- Updated on 19 September 2015

Khamica Bingham (born June 15, 1994) is a Canadian track and field athlete who specialises in the 100 metres. She has represented Canada at the Olympic Games, Pan American Games, Commonwealth Games and the World Championships in Athletics.

Bingham was born on June 15, 1994, in North York, Ontario. As a high schooler, she attended Heart Lake Secondary School. Originally a national-level gymnast, she switched to track due to the financial burden to her family of staying in her first sport.

In July 2012 she competed in the 100m at 14th IAAF World Junior Championships, placing 4th. She became part of the national record women's 4 × 100 m relay team along with Kimberly Hyacinthe, Crystal Emmanuel and Shai-Anne Davis.

In July 2016 she was officially named to Canada's Olympic team.

She competed at the 2020 Summer Olympics.
