= Jovana de la Cruz =

Peruvian long-distance runner

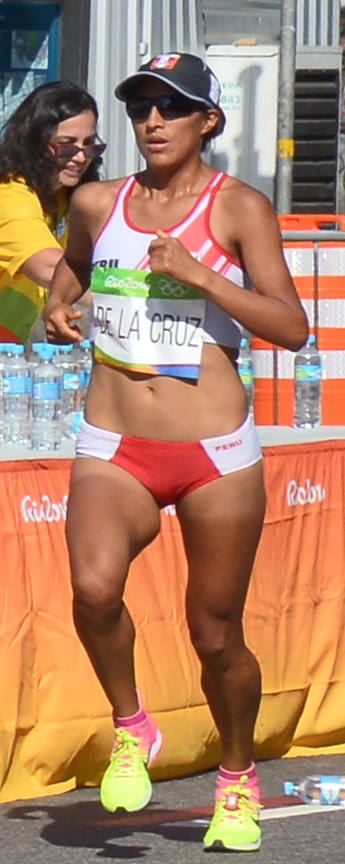
- Jovana de la Cruz at the 2016 Summer Olympics

Personal information
- Full name: Jovana de la Cruz Capani
- Born: 12 July 1992 (age 34)
- Height: 1.65 m (5 ft 5 in)
- Weight: 54 kg (119 lb)

Sport
- Sport: Track and field
- Event: Marathon

Jovana de la Cruz Capani (born 12 July 1992) is a Peruvian long-distance runner who specialises in the marathon. She competed in the women's marathon event at the 2016 Summer Olympics running a time of 2:35:49 for 36th place, and in the 2020 Olympic Games in Japan, finishing in 40th place in 2:36.38 in the women's marathon.

== Personal bests ==
- 10,000 meters – 32:46:10 (San Juan Capistrano, California, 2022)
- 10 km road – 33:50 (Lima, 2019)
- Half Marathon – 1:10:56 (Houston, Texas, 2018)
- Marathon – 2:26:49 (Houston Marathon, 2024)
