= Kamaria Durant =

Trinidadian sprinter (born 1991)

Personal information
- Born: 24 February 1991 (age 35)

Sport
- Country: Trinidad and Tobago
- Sport: Track and field
- Event: 200 metres

Kamaria Durant (born 24 February 1991) is a Trinidadian sprinter. She competed in the 200 metres event at the 2015 World Championships in Athletics in Beijing, China.
