= Athletics at the 2010 South American Games – Men's pole vault =

The Men's Pole Vault event at the 2010 South American Games was held on March 21 at 17:00.

== Medalists ==
Gold	Silver	Bronze
Augusto Dutra de Oliveira; Brazil	Cleber Damião da Silva; Brazil	Rubén Benítez; Argentina

== Records ==
Standing records prior to the 2010 South American Games
World record	Sergey Bubka	Ukraine	6.14m	Sestriere, Italy	31 July 1994
World Leading	Steve Hooker	Australia	5.91m	Sydney, Australia	27 February 2010
South American record	Fábio Gomes da Silva	Brazil	5.77m	São Paulo, Brazil	7 June 2007
South American U23 record	Germán Chiaraviglio	Argentina	5.71m	Beijing, China	19 August 2006

== Results ==
Results were published.

=== Final ===
Rank	Athlete	Nationality	Attempt											Best Result	Notes
Rank	Athlete	Nationality	4.20	4.35	4.50	4.60	4.70	4.80	4.85	4.90	4.95	5.00	5.10	Best Result	Notes
1st place, gold medalist(s)	Augusto Dutra de Oliveira	Brazil	–	–	–	–	o	o	–	–	–	xo	xxx	5.00	
2nd place, silver medalist(s)	Cleber Damião da Silva	Brazil	–	–	–	–	xo	o	–	–	–	xxx		4.80	
3rd place, bronze medalist(s)	Rubén Benítez	Argentina	–	–	o	–	o	xxx						4.70	
4	Eberth Gómez	Colombia	–	–	–	–	xo	xxx						4.70	
5	Felipe Andrés Fuentes	Chile	xxo	xo	o	o	xxx							4.60	
–	Rubén Patiño	Colombia	–	–	xxx									NM	

== See also ==
- 2010 South American Under-23 Championships in Athletics
