= Athletics at the 2018 Summer Youth Olympics – Boys' triple jump =

Boys' triple jump at the III Summer Youth Olympic Games
- Venue: Parque Polideportivo Roca
- Date: 13, 16 October
- Competitors: 15 from 15 nations

Medalists
1st place, gold medalist(s)		Jordan Díaz	Cuba
2nd place, silver medalist(s)		Ineh Oritsemeyiwa	Nigeria
3rd place, bronze medalist(s)		Praveen Chithravel	India

The boys' triple jump competition at the 2018 Summer Youth Olympics was held on 13 and 16 October at the Parque Polideportivo Roca.

== Schedule ==
All times are in local time (UTC-3).

Date	Time	Round
Saturday, 13 October 2018	14:30	Stage 1
Tuesday, 16 October 2018	14:05	Stage 2

== Results ==
=== Stage 1 ===
Rank	Athlete	Nation	1	2	3	4	Result	Notes
1	Jordan Díaz	Cuba	16.70	17.14	–	–	17.14	
2	Ineh Oritsemeyiwa	Nigeria	x	16.34w	x	x	16.34w	
3	Praveen Chithravel	India	x	15.04	15.56	15.84	15.84	
4	Yahor Chuiko	Belarus	x	14.94	15.20	15.46	15.46	PB
5	Batuhan Çakır	Turkey	14.67	15.22	15.39	15.45w	15.45w	
6	Li Yun-chen	Chinese Taipei	14.91	15.24w	15.34	15.25	15.34	PB
7	Hamidreza Kia	Iran	15.23	x	15.28	x	15.28	
8	Sifiso Miya	South Africa	15.26w	14.96	15.17	14.18	15.26w	
9	Rustam Mammadov	Azerbaijan	13.15	15.16	14.78	15.13	15.16	=PB
10	Islam Sibagatullin	Uzbekistan	15.15w	14.59	x	x	15.15w	
11	Apalos Edwards	Jamaica	14.44w	14.99	14.46	–	14.99	
12	Manuel Cuesta	Colombia	14.49w	x	x	14.89	14.89	
13	Kevin Bueno	Ecuador	14.50	x	14.88w	14.83	14.88w	
14	Luciano Méndez	Argentina	14.60	x	14.87	14.29	14.87	
15	Kelsey Daniel	Trinidad and Tobago	14.40	14.64	14.33	x	14.64	PB

=== Stage 2 ===
Rank	Athlete	Nation	1	2	3	4	Result	Notes
1	Jordan Díaz	Cuba	17.04	x	x	x	17.04	
2	Yahor Chuiko	Belarus	14.87	x	15.96	x	15.96	PB
3	Li Yun-chen	Chinese Taipei	15.74	15.62w	15.33	15.65	15.74	PB
4	Batuhan Çakır	Turkey	15.02w	15.64	15.02	15.71w	15.71w	
5	Praveen Chithravel	India	15.21w	15.63w	14.66	15.68w	15.68w	
6	Ineh Oritsemeyiwa	Nigeria	x	15.51	15.32	15.50	15.51	
7	Sifiso Miya	South Africa	14.54	15.34w	14.19	15.42w	15.42w	
8	Hamidreza Kia	Iran	15.20	15.32w	15.27w	15.40	15.40	
9	Rustam Mammadov	Azerbaijan	14.77	x	14.88w	15.30	15.30	PB
10	Kevin Bueno	Ecuador	14.30	14.87	15.04	14.97	15.04	
11	Apalos Edwards	Jamaica	14.93	13.80w	–	–	14.93	
12	Luciano Méndez	Argentina	14.56w	14.62	14.32	x	14.62	
13	Manuel Cuesta	Colombia	x	x	x	14.36	14.36	
14	Islam Sibagatullin	Uzbekistan	x	14.31	14.34	14.13	14.34	
15	Kelsey Daniel	Trinidad and Tobago	13.13	x	r		13.13	

=== Final placing ===
Rank	Athlete	Nation	Stage 1	Stage 2	Total
1st place, gold medalist(s)	Jordan Díaz	Cuba	17.14	17.04	34.18
2nd place, silver medalist(s)	Ineh Oritsemeyiwa	Nigeria	16.34	15.51	31.85
3rd place, bronze medalist(s)	Praveen Chithravel	India	15.84	15.68	31.52
4	Yahor Chuiko	Belarus	15.46	15.96	31.42
5	Batuhan Çakır	Turkey	15.45	15.71	31.16
6	Li Yun-chen	Chinese Taipei	15.34	15.74	31.08
7	Sifiso Miya	South Africa	15.26	15.42	30.68
8	Hamidreza Kia	Iran	15.28	15.40	30.68
9	Rustam Mammadov	Azerbaijan	15.16	15.30	30.46
10	Kevin Bueno	Ecuador	14.88	15.04	29.92
11	Apalos Edwards	Jamaica	14.99	14.93	29.92
12	Islam Sibagatullin	Uzbekistan	15.15	14.34	29.49
13	Luciano Méndez	Argentina	14.87	14.62	29.49
14	Manuel Cuesta	Colombia	14.89	14.36	29.25
15	Kelsey Daniel	Trinidad and Tobago	14.64	13.13	27.77
