= Athletics at the 2023 Pan American Games – Men's pole vault =

Men's pole vault at the 2023 Pan American Games
- Venue: Julio Martínez National Stadium
- Dates: November 4
- Competitors: 11 from 8 nations
- Winning height: 5.55

Medalists
| Gold medal | Matt Ludwig | United States |
| Silver medal | Germán Chiaraviglio | Argentina |
| Bronze medal | Jorge Luna | Mexico |

The men's pole vault competition of the athletics events at the 2023 Pan American Games took place on November 4 at the Julio Martínez National Stadium.

== Records ==
Prior to this competition, the existing world and Pan American Games records were as follows:

| World record | Armand Duplantis (SWE) | 6.22 | Clermont-Ferrand, France | February 25, 2023 |
| Pan American Games record | Lazaro Borges (CUB) | 5.80 | Guadalajara, Mexico | October 28, 2011 |

== Schedule ==
| Date | Time | Round |
|---|---|---|
| November 4, 2023 | 18:00 | Final |

== Results ==
All times shown are in meters.

| KEY: | q | Fastest non-qualifiers | Q | Qualified | NR | National record | PB | Personal best | SB | Seasonal best | DQ | Disqualified |

=== Final ===
The results were as follows:

| Rank | Name | Nationality | 4.90 | 5.10 | 5.20 | 5.30 | 5.40 | 5.50 | 5.55 | 5.60 | 5.65 | Mark | Notes |
|---|---|---|---|---|---|---|---|---|---|---|---|---|---|
| 1st place, gold medalist(s) | Matt Ludwig | United States | – | – | o | – | o | o | o | xx– | x | 5.55 | |
| 2nd place, silver medalist(s) | Germán Chiaraviglio | Argentina | – | – | xo | – | xxo | o | x–– | xx | | 5.50 | |
| 3rd place, bronze medalist(s) | Jorge Luna | Mexico | xxo | xo | xo | xo | o | xxx | | | | 5.40 | |
| 4 | Guillermo Correa | Chile | o | xo | xo | o | xo | xxx | | | | 5.40 | PB |
| 5 | Eduardo Nápoles | Cuba | – | – | o | o | xxx | | | | | 5.30 | |
| 6 | José Tomás Nieto | Colombia | – | xo | xo | xo | xxx | | | | | 5.30 | |
| 7 | Zach Bradford | United States | – | xo | o | xxx | | | | | | 5.20 | |
| 8 | Austin Ramos | Ecuador | o | xo | xxo | xxx | | | | | | 5.20 | SB |
| 9 | Cristóbal Núñez | Chile | xo | xxo | xxo | xxx | | | | | | 5.20 | |
| 10 | Ricardo Montes de Oca | Venezuela | – | xo | xxx | | | | | | | 5.10 | |
| | Dyander Pacho | Ecuador | – | xxx | | | | | | | | NH | |
