= Athletics at the 2019 Pan American Games – Men's pole vault =

Men's pole vault at the 2019 Pan American Games
- Venue: Athletics Stadium
- Dates: August 10
- Competitors: 11 from 8 nations
- Winning height: 5.76

Medalists
Gold medal	Chris Nilsen	United States
Silver medal	Augusto Dutra	Brazil
Bronze medal	Clayton Fritsch	United States

The men's pole vault competition of the athletics events at the 2019 Pan American Games took place on the 10 of August at the 2019 Pan American Games Athletics Stadium. The defending Pan American Games champion is Shawnacy Barber from Canada.

== Summary ==
The medals were decided at 5.61m, only three cleared it. Among the eliminated was Olympic champion Thiago Braz. Clayton Fritsch couldn't get over 5.71m and Augusto Dutra got over it on his second attempt, while Chris Nilsen still had a perfect round going. Dutra passed the next height, daring Nilsen to get over it. Nilsen was well over the bar on his attempts but peaking well behind the bar, he knocked it off on his first two attempts. On his final attempt at 5.76 m (18 ft 10 3/4 in) he was still too close to the bar, but managed to snake over it. When he landed with the bar still on its pegs, he celebrated. Both made attempts at 5.81m. At 1cm below his personal best from 6 years earlier, it would have been a heroic jump for Dutra, though still 14 cm below what Nilsen had done just two months earlier to win the NCAA Championships. Neither man made it, leaving Dutra with silver while Nilsen took gold.

== Records ==
Prior to this competition, the existing world and Pan American Games records were as follows:

World record	Renaud Lavillenie (FRA)	6.16	Donetsk, Ukraine	February 15, 2014
Pan American Games record	Lázaro Borges (CUB)	5.80	Guadalajara, Mexico	October 28, 2011

== Schedule ==
Date	Time	Round
August 10, 2019	14:20	Final

== Results ==
All times shown are in meters.

KEY:	q	Fastest non-qualifiers	Q	Qualified	NR	National record	PB	Personal best	SB	Seasonal best	DQ	Disqualified

=== Final ===
The results were as follows:

Rank	Name	Nationality	5.01	5.16	5.31	5.41	5.51	5.61	5.71	5.76	5.81	Mark	Notes
1st place, gold medalist(s)	Chris Nilsen	United States	–	–	o	–	o	o	o	xxo	xxx	5.76	
2nd place, silver medalist(s)	Augusto Dutra	Brazil	–	–	–	–	xo	xxo	xo	–	xxx	5.71	
3rd place, bronze medalist(s)	Clayton Fritsch	United States	–	–	xo	o	o	xxo	xxx			5.61	
4	Thiago Braz	Brazil	–	–	–	–	xo	xxx				5.51	
5	Germán Chiaraviglio	Argentina	–	–	xo	o	xo	xxx				5.51	
6	José Pacho	Ecuador	–	xo	xo	o	xxx					5.41	
7	Dyander Pacho	Ecuador	o	o	o	xxx						5.31	PB
8	Jorge Luna Estes	Mexico	–	o	xxo	xxx						5.31	
9	Andy Hernández Pedroso	Cuba	–	o	xxx							5.16	
10	Lázaro Borges	Cuba	–	xo	xxx							5.16	
10	Walter Viáfara	Colombia	–	xo	xxx							5.16	
	Antonio Ruiz Dobbs	Mexico	–	xxx								NH	
	Natán Rivera	El Salvador	xxr									NH	
