= 2013 World Youth Championships in Athletics – Boys' pole vault =

Boys' pole vault at the 2013 World Youth Championships in Athletics
- Venue: RSC Olimpiyskiy
- Dates: 12 July (qualification); 14 July (final)
- Competitors: 26
- Winning height: 5.25 PB

Medalists
gold medal	Harry Coppell	Great Britain
silver medal	Huang Bokai	China
bronze medal	Lev Skorish	Israel

The boys' pole vault at the 2013 World Youth Championships in Athletics was held on 12 and 14 July.

== Medalists ==
Gold	Silver	Bronze
Harry Coppell; Great Britain	Huang Bokai; China	Lev Skorish; Israel

== Records ==
Prior to the competition, the following records were as follows.

World Youth Best	Germán Chiaraviglio (ARG)	5.51	Porto Alegre, Brazil	1 May 2004
Championship Record	Nico Weiler (GER)	5.26	Ostrava, Czech Republic	15 July 2007
World Youth Leading	Hussain Al-Hizam (KSA)	5.27	Riyadh, Saudi Arabia	8 May 2013

== Qualification ==
Qualification rule: 4.85 (Q) or at least 12 best performers (q) qualified.

Rank	Group	Name	Nationality	4.35	4.50	4.60	4.70	4.80	4.85	Result	Notes
1	B	Adam Hague	Great Britain	–	o	–	o	o	o	4.85	Q
1	A	Aleix Pi	Spain	–	–	o	o	o	o	4.85	Q
1	A	Huang Bokai	China	–	–	–	o	–	o	4.85	Q
1	B	Devin King	United States	–	–	o	o	o	o	4.85	Q
1	A	Harry Coppell	Great Britain	–	–	–	–	–	o	4.85	Q
6	A	Tim Jäger	Germany	–	xo	–	o	o	o	4.85	Q
7	A	Paulo Benavides	United States	–	–	o	o	xxo	o	4.85	Q
8	B	Lev Skorish	Israel	–	–	o	xo	o	xo	4.85	Q
9	B	Luigi Colella	Italy	–	–	xo	o	xxo	xo	4.85	Q
10	B	Tomas Weckstén	Finland	o	xo	o	xo	xxo	xxo	4.85	Q, PB
11	B	Takumi Okamoto	Japan	–	o	o	xxo	o	xxx	4.80	q
12	A	Baptiste Maurin	France	–	xo	xo	xxo	xo	xxx	4.80	q
13	B	Henri Brown	Australia	xo	o	o	o	xxo	xxx	4.80	
14	A	Niko Koskinen	Finland	o	o	o	o	–	xxx	4.70	
15	B	José Pacho	Ecuador	–	xxo	xo	o	xxx		4.70	
16	A	Petros Chatziou	Greece	–	o	xo	xxo	xxx		4.70	
17	A	Ryo Takagi	Japan	o	–	o	xxx			4.60	
18	B	Zhang Yifan	China	xo	xo	o	xxx			4.60	
19	B	Alioune Sene	France	–	o	xxx				4.50	
19	A	Kyrylo Kiru	Ukraine	–	o	xxx				4.50	
21	B	Carl Ivarsson	Sweden	xxo	xo	xxx				4.50	
21	B	Luka Jereb	Slovenia	xxo	xo	xxx				4.50	
23	A	Sheng Yao Chan	Singapore	o	xxx					4.35	
	A	Daniele Zobbi	Italy	xxx						NM	
	B	Park Tae-won	South Korea	–	xxx					NM	
	A	Zachary Kerr	Canada	xxx						NM	

== Final ==
Rank	Name	Nationality	4.60	4.75	4.90	5.00	5.10	5.15	5.20	5.25	5.30	Result	Notes
1st place, gold medalist(s)	Harry Coppell	Great Britain	–	–	o	o	xxo	xo	xo	xxo	xxx	5.25	PB
2nd place, silver medalist(s)	Huang Bokai	China	–	–	xo	o	xo	xxo	xxo	xxx		5.20	PB
3rd place, bronze medalist(s)	Lev Skorish	Israel	–	o	o	xxo	xo	xxx				5.10	PB
4	Paulo Benavides	United States	–	xo	o	o	xxx					5.00	PB
5	Takumi Okamoto	Japan	o	xo	xo	xxo	xxx					5.00	PB
6	Devin King	United States	–	o	o	xxx						4.90	
6	Adam Hague	Great Britain	o	o	o	xxx						4.90	
8	Luigi Colella	Italy	o	xxo	o	xxx						4.90	
8	Aleix Pi	Spain	xo	xo	o	xxx						4.90	
10	Tim Jäger	Germany	o	xo	xo	xxx						4.90	
11	Tomas Weckstén	Finland	xo	xxxx								4.60	
	Baptiste Maurin	France	xxx									NM	
