= 2022 South American Indoor Championships in Athletics – Results =

These are the full results of the 2022 South American Indoor Championships in Athletics which took place in Cochabamba, Bolivia, on 19 and 20 February at the Estadio de Atletismo del Gobierno Autónomo Municipal de Cochabamba.

== Men's results ==
=== 60 meters ===
Heats – February 19

Rank	Heat	Name	Nationality	Time	Notes
1	1	Felipe Bardi dos Santos	Brazil	6.66	Q, CR
2	1	David Vivas	Venezuela	6.67	Q, NR
3	2	Franco Florio	Argentina	6.70	Q
4	2	Erik Cardoso	Brazil	6.72	Q
	1	Ezequiel Suárez*	Puerto Rico	6.81	
5	2	Tito Hinojosa	Bolivia	6.84	Q, NR
6	2	Alexander Salazar	Panama	6.88	q
7	1	Mateo Edward	Panama	6.95	Q
8	1	Julian Vargas	Bolivia	6.95	q
9	2	Luis Humberto Angulo	Peru	6.98	
10	2	Jesús Manuel Cáceres	Paraguay	7.05	

Final – February 19

Rank	Lane	Name	Nationality	Time	Notes
1st place, gold medalist(s)	4	Felipe Bardi dos Santos	Brazil	6.62	CR
2nd place, silver medalist(s)	5	David Vivas	Venezuela	6.63	NR
3rd place, bronze medalist(s)	3	Franco Florio	Argentina	6.70	
4	6	Erik Cardoso	Brazil	6.71	
5	2	Tito Hinojosa	Bolivia	6.84	=NR
6	8	Julian Vargas	Bolivia	6.91	
7	7	Alexander Salazar	Panama	6.95	
8	1	Mateo Edward	Panama	6.99	

=== 400 meters ===
Heats – February 19

Rank	Heat	Name	Nationality	Time	Notes
	2	Ezequiel Suàrez*	Puerto Rico	47.14	CR
1	2	Lucas Carvalho	Brazil	47.75	Q
2	1	Javier Gómez	Venezuela	47.99	Q
3	2	Pedro Luiz de Oliveira	Brazil	48.25	Q
4	1	Marcos González	Paraguay	49.89	Q, NR
5	1	Juan Manuel Gareca	Bolivia	49.91	q
6	1	Nery Peñaloza	Bolivia	49.95	q
	2	Kevin Mina	Colombia	DNS	

Final – February 20

Rank	Lane	Name	Nationality	Time	Notes
1st place, gold medalist(s)	4	Lucas Carvalho	Brazil	46.85	CR
2nd place, silver medalist(s)	5	Javier Gómez	Venezuela	47.25	
3rd place, bronze medalist(s)	6	Pedro Luiz de Oliveira	Brazil	47.40	
4	3	Nery Peñaloza	Bolivia	49.68	
5	1	Juan Manuel Gareca	Bolivia	49.75	
6	2	Marcos González	Paraguay	49.96	

=== 800 meters ===
February 20

Rank	Name	Nationality	Time	Notes
1st place, gold medalist(s)	Lucirio Antonio Garrido	Venezuela	1:52.12	CR
2nd place, silver medalist(s)	Eduardo Moreira	Brazil	1:52.40	
3rd place, bronze medalist(s)	Guilherme Kurtz	Brazil	1:52.71	
4	Ryan López	Venezuela	1:57.99	
5	Omar Sotomayor	Bolivia	1:58.36	
6	Fermín González	Bolivia	2:01.85	

=== 1500 meters ===
February 19

Rank	Name	Nationality	Time	Notes
1st place, gold medalist(s)	David Ninavia	Bolivia	3:56.16	CR
2nd place, silver medalist(s)	José Daniel González	Venezuela	3:57.13	
3rd place, bronze medalist(s)	Guilherme Kurtz	Brazil	3:57.58	
4	Lucirio Antonio Garrido	Venezuela	3:58.82	
5	Vidal Basco	Bolivia	4:04.58	
	Matheus Américo Pessoa*	Brazil	4:11.35	
6	Carlos Santos	Brazil	4:17.03	

=== 3000 meters ===
February 20

Rank	Name	Nationality	Time	Notes
1st place, gold medalist(s)	Daniel Toroya	Bolivia	8:38.29	
2nd place, silver medalist(s)	Ederson Pereira	Brazil	8:40.96	
3rd place, bronze medalist(s)	José Daniel González	Venezuela	8:49.80	
4	Mario Flores	Bolivia	8:58.81	
5	Jurandyr Couto	Brazil	10:23.83	
	Guilherme Kurtz	Brazil	DNS	

=== 60 meters hurdles ===
February 20

Rank	Lane	Name	Nationality	Time	Notes
1st place, gold medalist(s)	5	Rafael Pereira	Brazil	7.58	CR, =AR
2nd place, silver medalist(s)	4	Gabriel Constantino	Brazil	7.72	
3rd place, bronze medalist(s)	3	Agustín Carrera	Argentina	7.85	NR
4	7	Mauricio Garrido	Peru	7.87	
5	6	Yohan Chaverra	Colombia	7.98	
6	1	Martín Sáenz	Chile	8.01	
7	2	Mauricio Sandoval	Bolivia	8.21	
8	8	Enrique Bellott	Bolivia	8.65	

=== 4 × 400 meters relay ===
February 20

Rank	Nation	Athletes	Time	Note
1st place, gold medalist(s)	Venezuela	Leodan Torrealba, Lucirio Antonio Garrido, Ryan López, Javier Gómez	3:16.91	CR
2nd place, silver medalist(s)	Bolivia	Tito Hinojosa, Juan Manuel Gareca, Alberto Antelo, Nery Peñaloza	3:17.87	NR

=== High jump ===
February 20

Rank	Name	Nationality	1.90	1.95	2.05	2.10	2.13	2.16	2.19	2.22	2.25	Result	Notes
1st place, gold medalist(s)	Thiago Moura	Brazil	–	–	–	–	o	o	o	o	xxx	2.22	
2nd place, silver medalist(s)	Carlos Layoy	Argentina	–	–	o	o	–	o	xxx			2.16	=NR
3rd place, bronze medalist(s)	José André Camacho	Bolivia	xxo	xxx								1.90	
	Fernando Ferreira	Brazil										DNS	

=== Pole vault ===
February 19

Rank	Name	Nationality	4.80	5.00	5.05	5.20	5.25	5.40	5.50	Result	Notes
1st place, gold medalist(s)	Augusto Dutra de Oliveira	Brazil	–	xo	–	xo	–	xx–	o	5.50	=CR
2nd place, silver medalist(s)	Abel Curtinove	Brazil	o	x–	xo	–	xxx			5.05	
	Bruno Spinelli*	Brazil	–	o	–	xxx				5.00	
	Germán Chiaraviglio	Argentina	–	–	–	xxx				NM	

=== Long jump ===
February 20

Rank	Name	Nationality	#1	#2	#3	#4	#5	#6	Result	Notes
1st place, gold medalist(s)	José Luis Mandros	Peru	7.96	8.06	8.04	8.12	x	8.17	8.17	CR, NR
2nd place, silver medalist(s)	Emiliano Lasa	Uruguay	x	8.08	8.10	–	x	7.94	8.10	NR
3rd place, bronze medalist(s)	Samory Fraga	Brazil	x	7.82	7.64	x	7.80	7.72	7.82	
4	Gabriel Luiz Boza	Brazil	7.47	x	x	7.46	7.46	x	7.47	AU20R
5	Miguel Alfaro	Bolivia	5.93	x	6.56	x	6.71	6.90	6.90	
6	Romulo Colodro	Bolivia	6.57	6.69	x	6.69	x	6.57	6.69	

=== Triple jump ===
February 20

Rank	Name	Nationality	#1	#2	#3	#4	#5	#6	Result	Notes
1st place, gold medalist(s)	Alexsandro Melo	Brazil	16.12	x	16.43	x	16.62	16.62	16.62	
2nd place, silver medalist(s)	Almir dos Santos	Brazil	15.93	16.53		16.17	–	16.59	16.59	
3rd place, bronze medalist(s)	Leodan Torrealba	Venezuela	15.71	16.50	16.55	16.49	x	15.91	16.55	
4	Maximiliano Díaz	Argentina	x	16.02	15.71	x	x	x	16.02	
5	Miguel Alfaro	Bolivia	x	13.96	x	x	x	13.84	13.96	
6	Mauricio Rivera	Bolivia	x	13.46	13.43	13.58	–	x	13.58	
	Mateus de Sá	Brazil							DNS	

=== Shot put ===
February 20

Rank	Name	Nationality	#1	#2	#3	#4	#5	#6	Result	Notes
1st place, gold medalist(s)	Darlan Romani	Brazil	20.27	20.87	21.71	21.19	20.68	19.91	21.71	WL, CR, AR
2nd place, silver medalist(s)	Willian Dourado	Brazil	19.09	19.83	19.57	19.55	19.74	19.33	19.83	
3rd place, bronze medalist(s)	Ignacio Carballo	Argentina	x	18.40	19.04	18.25	18.70	18.98	19.04	
4	Matias Püschel	Chile	15.98	16.05	x	14.80	15.38	x	16.05	

=== Heptathlon ===
February 19–20

The highest mark recorded in each event is highlighted in yellow

Rank	Athlete	Nationality	60m	LJ	SP	HJ	60m H	PV	1000m	Points	Notes
1st place, gold medalist(s)	Felipe Vinícius dos Santos	Brazil	6.75	7.10	14.00	2.00	7.78	4.70	3:06.71	5799	CR
2nd place, silver medalist(s)	Georni Jaramillo	Venezuela	7.04	7.57	16.07	1.85	8.03	4.20	3:11.19	5552	
3rd place, bronze medalist(s)	José Fernando Ferreira	Brazil	7.05	7.34	12.89	1.88	8.00	4.70	3:09.97	5489	

== Women's results ==
=== 60 meters ===
February 19

Rank	Lane	Name	Nationality	Time	Notes
1st place, gold medalist(s)	4	Rosângela Santos	Brazil	7.24	CR
2nd place, silver medalist(s)	2	Vitoria Cristina Rosa	Brazil	7.25	
3rd place, bronze medalist(s)	3	Macarena Borie	Chile	7.43	
4	5	María Florencia Lamboglia	Argentina	7.53	
5	7	Leticia Arispe	Bolivia	7.56	
6	6	Guadalupe Torrez	Bolivia	7.66	
7	8	Rocío Muñoz	Chile	7.76	
8	1	Paula Daruich	Peru	7.84	

=== 400 meters ===
February 20

Rank	Lane	Name	Nationality	Time	Notes
1st place, gold medalist(s)	4	Tábata de Carvalho	Brazil	54.81	
2nd place, silver medalist(s)	5	Liliane Parrela	Brazil	55.37	
3rd place, bronze medalist(s)	6	Noelia Martínez	Argentina	55.88	
4	3	Cecilia Gómez	Bolivia	56.04	
5	1	María Florencia Lamboglia	Argentina	57.36	
6	2	Mariana Arce	Bolivia	57.42	

=== 800 meters ===
February 20

Rank	Name	Nationality	Time	Notes
1st place, gold medalist(s)	Deborah Rodríguez	Uruguay	2:18.23	
2nd place, silver medalist(s)	Jaqueline Weber	Brazil	2:18.58	
3rd place, bronze medalist(s)	Martina Escudero	Argentina	2:19.33	
4	Tania Guasace	Bolivia	2:20.52	
5	Nathia González	Colombia	2:20.75	
6	Evanyelin Mayta	Bolivia	2:23.86	
7	Mayara Leite	Brazil	2:51.83	

=== 1500 meters ===
February 19

Rank	Name	Nationality	Time	Notes
1st place, gold medalist(s)	Jhoselyn Camargo	Bolivia	4:39.33	
2nd place, silver medalist(s)	Tatiana Poma	Bolivia	4:46.49	
3rd place, bronze medalist(s)	Jaqueline Weber	Brazil	4:49.42	
	Rejane da Silva	Brazil	DNF	

=== 3000 meters ===
February 20

Rank	Name	Nationality	Time	Notes
1st place, gold medalist(s)	Lizeth Veizaga	Bolivia	10:47.84	
2nd place, silver medalist(s)	Eva Fernández	Bolivia	11:09.00	
3rd place, bronze medalist(s)	Elisângela de Oliveira	Brazil	11:40.68	

=== 60 meters hurdles ===
February 20

Rank	Lane	Name	Nationality	Time	Notes
1st place, gold medalist(s)	8	Ketiley Batista	Brazil	8.41	
2nd place, silver medalist(s)	6	Diana Bazalar	Peru	8.48	
3rd place, bronze medalist(s)	7	Valentina Polanco	Argentina	8.62	
4	4	Vitória Alves	Brazil	8.72	
5	3	Thaynara Zoch	Bolivia	9.00	
6	2	Camila Jiménez	Bolivia	9.19	
	5	Paola Vásquez*	Puerto Rico	10.21	

=== 4 × 400 meters relay ===
February 20

Rank	Nation	Athletes	Time	Note
1st place, gold medalist(s)	Bolivia	Lucía Sotomayor, Mariana Arce, Tania Guasace, Cecilia Gómez	3:47.37	CR, NR
2nd place, silver medalist(s)	Argentina	Martina Escudero, Valentina Polanco, María Florencia Lamboglia, Noelia Martínez	3:59.15	NR

=== High jump ===
February 20

Rank	Name	Nationality	1.55	1.60	1.65	1.70	1.73	1.76	1.79	1.82	Result	Notes
1st place, gold medalist(s)	Sarah Freitas	Brazil	–	–	o	o	o	o	o	xxx	1.79	
2nd place, silver medalist(s)	Arielly Rodrigues	Brazil	–	o	o	xo	o	xxx			1.73	
3rd place, bronze medalist(s)	Carla Ríos	Bolivia	o	o	o	o	xxx				1.70	
	Lorena Aires	Uruguay	–	–	–	xxx					NM	

=== Pole vault ===
February 20

Rank	Name	Nationality	3.60	3.80	4.00	4.05	4.10	4.30	Result	Notes
1st place, gold medalist(s)	Isabel de Quadros	Brazil	–	o	o	–	o	xxx	4.10	CR
2nd place, silver medalist(s)	Alejandra Arevalo	Peru	–	o	xo	–	xxx		4.00	
3rd place, bronze medalist(s)	Juliana Campos	Brazil	xo	o	–	xxx			3.80	

=== Long jump ===
February 19

Rank	Name	Nationality	#1	#2	#3	#4	#5	#6	Result	Notes
1st place, gold medalist(s)	Nathalee Aranda	Panama	6.42	x	6.43	x	6.31	–	6.43	
2nd place, silver medalist(s)	Rocío Muñoz	Chile	6.23	6.28	6.18	x	6.29	x	6.29	NR
3rd place, bronze medalist(s)	Eliane Martins	Brazil	x	6.23	x	x	x	x	6.23	
4	Valeria Quispe	Bolivia	x	5.89	6.00	6.02	5.95	5.98	6.02	NR
5	Alejandra Arevalo	Peru	5.83	5.86	5.66	5.72	–	5.60	5.86	
6	Thaynara Zoch	Bolivia	5.66	5.73	5.56	–	–	–	5.73	
7	Paula Daruich	Peru	4.64	3.91	5.10	4.87	5.20	5.35	5.35	
	Lissandra Campos	Brazil							DNS	

=== Triple jump ===
February 20

Rank	Name	Nationality	#1	#2	#3	#4	#5	#6	Result	Notes
1st place, gold medalist(s)	Gabriele dos Santos	Brazil	13.64	13.89	x	13.84	x	13.87	13.89	CR
2nd place, silver medalist(s)	Liuba Zaldívar	Ecuador	13.34	13.09	13.30	13.66	13.42	x	13.66	NR
3rd place, bronze medalist(s)	Silvana Segura	Peru	x	x	13.14	13.27	x	13.31	13.31	NR
4	Ketllyn Zanette	Brazil	12.74	13.07	12.92	12.96	12.98	12.93	13.07	
5	Valeria Quispe	Bolivia	13.00	x	x	x	12.86	13.03	13.03	NR
	Alejandra Arevalo	Peru	x	–	–	–	–	–	NM	

=== Shot put ===
February 19

Rank	Name	Nationality	#1	#2	#3	#4	#5	#6	Result	Notes
1st place, gold medalist(s)	Livia Avancini	Brazil	17.31	x	17.52	16.86	17.34	17.36	17.52	CR
2nd place, silver medalist(s)	Ivanna Gallardo	Chile	16.30	x	x	15.88	16.82	17.03	17.03	
3rd place, bronze medalist(s)	Milena Sens	Brazil	14.34	15.27	15.42	16.59	15.56	x	16.59	
	Geisa Arcanjo	Brazil							DNS	

=== Pentathlon ===
February 19

The highest mark recorded in each event is highlighted in yellow

Rank	Athlete	Nationality	60m H	HJ	SP	LJ	800m	Points	Notes
1st place, gold medalist(s)	Raiane Procópio	Brazil	8.87	1.72	11.49	5.80	2:30.30	3921	CR
2nd place, silver medalist(s)	Camila Jiménez	Bolivia	9.24	1.54	8.82	5.52	2:44.88	3202	
