= Athletics at the 2011 Pan American Games – Men's pole vault =

Men's pole vault at the 2011 Pan American Games
- Venue: Telmex Athletics Stadium
- Dates: October 28
- Competitors: 12 from 8 nations

Medalists
Gold medal	Lázaro Borges	Cuba
Silver medal	Jeremy Scott	United States
Bronze medal	Giovanni Lanaro	Mexico

The men's pole vault event of the athletics events at the 2011 Pan American Games was held the 28 of October at the Telmex Athletics Stadium. The defending Pan American Games champion is Fábio Gomes da Silva of the Brazil.

== Records ==
Prior to this competition, the existing world and Pan American Games records were as follows:

World record	Sergey Bubka (UKR)	6.14	Sestriere, Italy	July 31, 1994
Pan American Games record	Pat Manson (USA)	5.75	Mar del Plata, Argentine	March 18, 1995

== Qualification ==
Each National Olympic Committee (NOC) was able to enter up to two entrants providing they had met the minimum standard (5.00) in the qualifying period (January 1, 2010 to September 14, 2011).

== Schedule ==
Date	Time	Round
October 28, 2011	15:30	Final

== Results ==
All distances shown are in meters:centimeters

KEY:	q	Fastest non-qualifiers	Q	Qualified	NR	National record	PB	Personal best	SB	Seasonal best

=== Final ===
The final was held on October 28.

Rank	Athlete	Nationality	4.90	5.05	5.20	5.30	5.40	5.50	5.60	5.65	5.70	5.76	5.80	Result	Notes
1st place, gold medalist(s)	Lázaro Borges	Cuba	–	–	–	–	o	o	o	–	o	xxo	o	5.80	PR
2nd place, silver medalist(s)	Jeremy Scott	United States	–	–	–	o	xo	xo	o	–	xxx			5.60	
3rd place, bronze medalist(s)	Giovanni Lanaro	Mexico	–	–	–	o	o	o	xxx					5.50	
4	Germán Chiaraviglio	Argentina	–	–	xo	–	xo	xo	xxx					5.50	SB
5	Fábio Gomes da Silva	Brazil	–	–	–	o	xo	xxx						5.40	
6	Yanquier Lara	Cuba	–	o	xo	–	xo	xxx						5.40	
7	Jason Wurster	Canada	–	–	o	xxx								5.20	
8	Luis Nevárez	Mexico	o	o	xxx									5.05	
9	Rubén Benitez	Argentina	o	xo	xxx									5.05	
10	Jabari Ennis	Jamaica	o	xxx										4.90	
	Nick Mossberg	United States	–	–	xxx									NM	
	Rick Valcin	Saint Lucia	xxx											NM	
