= Lucirio Antonio Garrido =

Venezuelan middle-distance runner

Personal information
- Full name: Lucirio Antonio Garrido Acosta
- Born: April 8, 1992 (age 34)
- Height: 1.80 m (5 ft 11 in)
- Weight: 83 kg (183 lb)

Sport
- Sport: Athletics
- Event(s): 800 m, 1500 m

Lucirio Antonio Garrido Acosta (born 8 April 1992) is a Venezuelan middle-distance runner.

Coming from a well-known Venezuelan athletics family, he is a son of a former runner Lucirio Garrido Jr., who is also his coach, grandson of Lucirio Garrido Sr., and brother of hurdler Lucirio Francisco Garrido.

== International competitions ==
| Year | Competition | Venue | Position | Event | Notes |
Representing Venezuela
| 2009 | South American Junior Championships | Port of Spain, Trinidad and Tobago | 3rd | 1500 m | 4:00.43 |
| 2011 | Pan American Junior Championships | Miramar, United States | 3rd | 800 m | 1:49.88 |
| 2011 | South American Junior Championships | Medellín, Colombia | 5th | 800 m | 1:51.49 |
| 2011 | South American Junior Championships | Medellín, Colombia | 2nd | 1500 m | 3:53.10 |
| 2012 | Ibero-American Championships | Barquisimeto, Venezuela | 5th | 800 m | 1:50.14 |
| 2012 | South American U23 Championships | São Paulo, Brazil | 3rd | 800 m | 1:48.60 |
| 2012 | South American U23 Championships | São Paulo, Brazil | 6th | 1500 m | 4:03.04 |
| 2013 | South American Championships | Cartagena, Colombia | 4th | 800 m | 1:48.83 |
| 2013 | Bolivarian Games | Trujillo, Peru | 2nd | 800 m | 1:47.32 |
| 2013 | Bolivarian Games | Trujillo, Peru | 2nd | 4 × 400 m relay | 3:07.19 |
| 2014 | Ibero-American Championships | São Paulo, Brazil | 3rd | 800 m | 1:46.60 |
| 2014 | Ibero-American Championships | São Paulo, Brazil | 8th | 1500 m | 3:54.60 |
| 2014 | South American U23 Championships | Montevideo, Uruguay | 3rd | 800 m | 1:50.87 |
| 2014 | South American U23 Championships | Montevideo, Uruguay | 6th | 1500 m | 3:51.17 |
| 2014 | Central American and Caribbean Games | Xalapa, Mexico | 5th | 800 m | 1:48.49 |
| 2015 | South American Championships | Lima, Peru | 2nd | 800 m | 1:47.83 |
| 2015 | Pan American Games | Toronto, Canada | 12th (h) | 800 m | 1:49.84 |
| 2016 | Ibero-American Championships | Rio de Janeiro, Brazil | 3rd | 800 m | 1:46.72 |
| 2017 | South American Championships | Asunción, Paraguay | 6th | 800 m | 1:51.36 |
| 2017 | Bolivarian Games | Santa Marta, Colombia | 2nd | 800 m | 1:48.12 |
| 2017 | Bolivarian Games | Santa Marta, Colombia | 3rd | 1500 m | 3:47.92 |
| 2018 | South American Games | Cochabamba, Bolivia | 1st | 800 m | 1:51.15 |
| 2018 | South American Games | Cochabamba, Bolivia | – | 1500 m | DNF |
| 2018 | Central American and Caribbean Games | Barranquilla, Colombia | 10th (h) | 800 m | 1:49.49 |
| 2019 | South American Championships | Lima, Peru | 1st | 800 m | 1:46.27 |
| 2019 | South American Championships | Lima, Peru | 1st | 1500 m | 3:55.04 |
| 2019 | Pan American Games | Lima, Peru | 6th (h) | 800 m | 1:49.51^{1} |
| 2019 | World Championships | Doha, Qatar | 30th (h) | 800 m | 1:46.89 |
| 2019 | World Championships | Doha, Qatar | 43rd (h) | 1500 m | 3:52.93 |
| 2020 | South American Indoor Championships | Cochabamba, Bolivia | 1st | 800 m | 1:53.54 |
| 2022 | South American Indoor Championships | Cochabamba, Bolivia | 1st | 800 m | 1:52.12 |
| 2022 | South American Indoor Championships | Cochabamba, Bolivia | 4th | 1500 m | 3:58.82 |
| 2022 | South American Indoor Championships | Cochabamba, Bolivia | 1st | 4 × 400 m relay | 3:16.91 |
| 2022 | Ibero-American Championships | La Nucía, Spain | 6th | 1500 m | 3:45.97 |
| 2022 | Bolivarian Games | Valledupar, Colombia | 5th | 800 m | 1:49.39 |
| 2022 | Bolivarian Games | Valledupar, Colombia | 7th | 1500 m | 3:51.19 |
| 2023 | ALBA Games | Caracas, Venezuela | 3rd | 1500 m | 3:55.81 |
| 2023 | ALBA Games | Caracas, Venezuela | 2nd | 5000 m | 15:11.57 |
| 2023 | Central American and Caribbean Games | San Salvador, El Salvador | 9th | 1500 m | 3:54.50 |

^{1}Did no start in the final

== Personal bests ==
Outdoor

- 800 metres – 1:46.02 (Medellín 2017)
- 1500 metres – 3:47.35 (Barinas 2017)
