= Athletics at the 2015 Pan American Games – Men's pole vault =

Men's pole vault at the 2015 Pan American Games
- Venue: CIBC Pan Am and Parapan Am Athletics Stadium
- Dates: July 21
- Competitors: 10 from 7 nations
- Winning height: 5.80 m

Medalists
Gold medal	Shawnacy Barber	Canada
Silver medal	Germán Chiaraviglio	Argentina
Bronze medal	Mark Hollis	United States
Bronze medal	Jacob Blankenship	United States

The men's pole vault competition of the athletics events at the 2015 Pan American Games took place on July 21 at the CIBC Pan Am and Parapan Am Athletics Stadium. The defending Pan American Games champion is Lázaro Borges of Cuba.

== Records ==
Prior to this competition, the existing world and Pan American Games records were as follows:

World record	Sergey Bubka (UKR)	6.14	Sestriere, Italy	July 31, 1994
Pan American Games record	Lázaro Borges (CUB)	5.80	Guadalajara, Mexico	October 28, 2011

== Qualification ==
Each National Olympic Committee (NOC) was able to enter up to two entrants providing they had met the minimum standard (4.98) in the qualifying period (January 1, 2014 to June 28, 2015).

== Schedule ==
Date	Time	Round
July 21, 2015	10:15	Final

== Results ==
All results shown are in meters.

KEY:	q	Best non-qualifiers	Q	Qualified	NR	National record	PB	Personal best	SB	Seasonal best	DQ	Disqualified

=== Final ===
Rank	Name	Nationality	5.00	5.20	5.40	5.60	5.65	5.70	5.75	5.80	5.85	5.90	5.93	Mark	Notes
1st place, gold medalist(s)	Shawnacy Barber	Canada	–	o	xo	xo	–	o	–	xo	–	–	xxx	5.80	=PR
2nd place, silver medalist(s)	Germán Chiaraviglio	Argentina	–	xxo	o	o	–	x–	o	–	xxx			5.75	NR
3rd place, bronze medalist(s)	Mark Hollis	United States	–	–	xo	xxx								5.40	
3rd place, bronze medalist(s)	Jacob Blankenship	United States	–	–	xo	xxx								5.40	
5	Lázaro Borges	Cuba	–	xxo	xo	xxx								5.40	SB
6	Jason Wurster	Canada	o	xxx										5.00	
6	José Rodolfo Pacho	Ecuador	o	xxx										5.00	
	Thiago Braz da Silva	Brazil	–	–	xxx									NM	
	Fabio da Silva	Brazil	–	–	xxx									NM	
	Daniel Zupeuc	Chile	xxx											NM	
