= Clayton Fritsch =

American pole vaulter (born 1998)

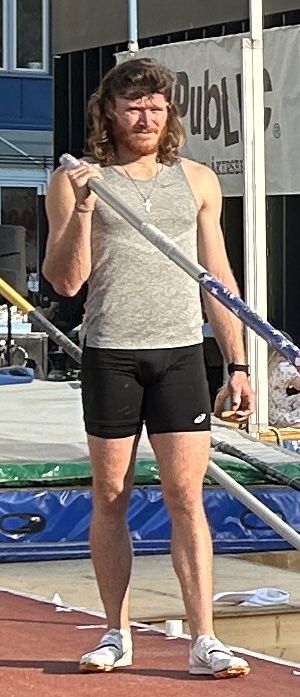
- Clayton Fritsch in Täby, Sweden, in 2024

Personal information
- Born: December 29, 1998 (age 27)

Sport
- Country: United States
- Sport: Track and field
- Event: Pole vault
Medal record
Representing United States
Pan American Games
Bronze medal – third place	2019 Lima	Pole vault

Clayton Fritsch (born December 29, 1998) is an American pole vaulter. He won the bronze medal in the men's pole vault event at the 2019 Pan American Games held in Lima, Peru.

In that same year, he won the bronze medal in the men's pole vault event at the 2019 NCAA Division I Outdoor Track and Field Championships. He also won the gold medal in the men's pole vault event at the 2019 NACAC U18 and U23 Championships in Athletics held in Queretaro, Mexico.

Fritsch is from Sealy, Texas. He became the first Sam Houston State Bearkats track and field medal-winner at the NCAA outdoor championships in 2019, and went on to finish runner-up in the pole vault at the 2022 NCAA Division I Outdoor Track and Field Championships.
