= Samory Fraga =

Brazilian long jumper

Personal information
- Full name: Samory Uiki Bandeira Fraga
- Born: 29 November 1996 (age 29) Porto Alegre, Brazil

Sport
- Sport: Track and Field
- Event: Long jump

Samory Uiki Bandeira Fraga (born 29 November 1996) is a Brazilian long jumper who competed at the 2020 Summer Olympics.

== Personal life ==
From Porto Alegre, Brazil, Fraga studied international relations at Kent State University on an athletic scholarship.

== Career ==
Fraga was selected as part of the Brazil team for the 2020 Summer Games long jump competition.

== Personal bests ==
Outdoor

- Long Jump: 8.23 (wind: +1.3 m/s) – (Brazil) Bragança Paulista, 24 Apr 2021

Indoor

- Long Jump: 7.87 – (Serbia) Belgrade, 18 Mar 2022

== International competitions ==
Year	Competition	Venue	Position	Event	Notes
Representing Brazil
2013	World Youth Championships	Donetsk, Ukraine	9th	Long jump	7.29 m
2013	Pan American Junior Championships	Medellín, Colombia	10th	Long jump	6.83 m
2015	South American Junior Championships	Cuenca, Ecuador	1st	Long jump	7.62 m
2015	Pan American Junior Championships	Edmonton, Canada	7th	Long jump	7.44 m
2018	South American U23 Championships	Cuenca, Ecuador	1st	Long jump	7.42 m
2021	South American Championships	Guayaquil, Ecuador	4th	Long jump	7.93 m
2021	Olympic Games	Tokyo, Japan	16th (q)	Long jump	7.88 m
2022	South American Indoor Championships	Cochabamba, Bolivia	3rd	Long jump	7.82 m
2022	World Indoor Championships	Belgrade, Serbia	9th	Long jump	7.87 m
2022	World Championships	Eugene, United States	27th (q)	Long jump	7.51 m
