= 2023 South American Championships in Athletics – Results =

These are the results of the 2023 South American Championships in Athletics which took place in São Paulo, Brazil, from 28 to 30 July at the Centro Olímpico de Treinamento e Pesquisa.

== Men's results ==
=== 100 meters ===
Heats – 28 July
Wind:
Heat 1: +0.6 m/s, Heat 2: -0.6 m/s

Rank	Heat	Name	Nationality	Time	Notes
2	2	Paulo André de Oliveira	Brazil	10.07	Q
3	1	Erik Cardoso	Brazil	10.08	Q
4	2	Ronal Longa	Colombia	10.18	Q
5	1	Alonso Edward	Panama	10.24	Q
6	2	Katriel Angulo	Ecuador	10.38	q
7	2	David Vivas	Venezuela	10.40	q
8	1	Neiker Abello	Colombia	10.40	Q
9	1	Franco Florio	Argentina	10.40	
10	1	Alexis Nieves	Venezuela	10.42	
11	1	Aron Patrick	Peru	10.45	NU20R
12	2	Fredy Maidana	Paraguay	10.57	
13	1	Gustavo Mongelós	Paraguay	10.62	
13	2	Alexander Salazar	Panama	10.62	
15	2	Steeven Salas	Ecuador	10.64	
16	1	D'Angelo Huisden	Suriname	11.02	
	2	Issam Asinga	Suriname	DQ	^{[a]}

Final – 28 July
Wind:
+0.8 m/s

Rank	Lane	Name	Nationality	Time	Notes
1st place, gold medalist(s)	3	Erik Cardoso	Brazil	9.97	CR, NR
2nd place, silver medalist(s)	7	Ronal Longa	Colombia	9.99	AU23R, AU20R, NR,
3rd place, bronze medalist(s)	4	Paulo André de Oliveira	Brazil	10.03	
4	6	Alonso Edward	Panama	10.14	
5	1	David Vivas	Venezuela	10.24	NR
6	8	Katriel Angulo	Ecuador	10.28	
7	2	Neiker Abello	Colombia	10.33	
	5	Issam Asinga	Suriname	DQ	^{[a]}

=== 200 meters ===
Heats – 30 July
Wind:
Heat 1: -0.4 m/s, Heat 2: +0.9 m/s

Rank	Heat	Name	Nationality	Time	Notes
1	2	Alonso Edward	Panama	20.57	Q
3	2	Jorge Vides	Brazil	20.66	Q
4	1	César Almirón	Paraguay	20.66	Q
5	2	Carlos Palacios	Colombia	20.80	Q
6	1	Óscar Baltán	Colombia	20.86	Q
7	2	Juan Ignacio Ciampitti	Argentina	20.92	q
8	1	Katriel Angulo	Ecuador	20.98	q
9	1	Lucas da Silva	Brazil	20.98	
10	2	Anderson Marquinez	Ecuador	21.17	
11	1	Bautista Diamante	Argentina	21.19	
12	1	Arturo Deliser	Panama	21.28	
13	1	David Vivas	Venezuela	21.32	
14	2	Rafael Vásquez	Venezuela	21.36	
15	2	Jhumiler Sánchez	Paraguay	21.59	
	1	Issam Asinga	Suriname	DQ	^{[b]}

Final – 30 July
Wind:
+0.7 m/s

Rank	Lane	Name	Nationality	Time	Notes
1st place, gold medalist(s)	4	Alonso Edward	Panama	20.30	
2nd place, silver medalist(s)	3	César Almirón	Paraguay	20.49	
3rd place, bronze medalist(s)	6	Jorge Vides	Brazil	20.59	
4	7	Óscar Baltán	Colombia	20.89	
5	1	Juan Ignacio Ciampitti	Argentina	21.01	
6	2	Katriel Angulo	Ecuador	21.14	
	8	Carlos Palacios	Colombia	DNS	
	5	Issam Asinga	Suriname	DQ	^{[b]}

=== 400 meters ===
Heats – 29 July

Rank	Heat	Name	Nationality	Time	Notes
1	1	Lucas Carvalho	Brazil	44.79	Q, PB
2	1	Anthony Zambrano	Colombia	46.49	Q
3	2	Maxsuel Santana	Brazil	46.53	Q
4	2	Kelvis Padrino	Venezuela	46.56	Q
5	2	Jhon Perlaza	Colombia	46.57	Q
6	1	Pedro Emmert	Argentina	46.61	Q, PB
7	1	Javier Gómez	Venezuela	46.91	q
8	2	Elián Larregina	Argentina	46.98	q
9	2	Francisco Guerrero	Ecuador	47.39	
10	2	Martín Zabala	Chile	47.57	
11	1	Lenin Sánchez	Ecuador	47.58	
12	1	Jhumiler Sánchez	Paraguay	48.33	NU20R
13	1	Nery Peñaloza	Bolivia	49.31	
14	2	Marcos González	Paraguay	49.93	

Final – 29 July

Rank	Lane	Name	Nationality	Time	Notes
1st place, gold medalist(s)	6	Anthony Zambrano	Colombia	45.52	
2nd place, silver medalist(s)	1	Elián Larregina	Argentina	45.63	
3rd place, bronze medalist(s)	3	Jhon Perlaza	Colombia	45.86	
4	7	Kelvis Padrino	Venezuela	46.06	
5	2	Javier Gómez	Venezuela	46.89	
6	4	Maxsuel Santana	Brazil	47.04	
7	8	Pedro Emmert	Argentina	47.50	
8	5	Lucas Carvalho	Brazil	47.64	

=== 800 meters ===
30 July

Rank	Name	Nationality	Time	Notes
1st place, gold medalist(s)	Eduardo Moreira	Brazil	1:47.12	
2nd place, silver medalist(s)	Rafael Muñoz	Chile	1:47.27	
3rd place, bronze medalist(s)	José Antonio Maita	Venezuela	1:47.65	
4	Jelssin Robledo	Colombia	1:48.16	
5	Ryan López	Venezuela	1:48.79	
6	Guilherme Kurtz	Brazil	1:48.80	
7	Fernando Arevalo	Chile	1:49.01	
8	Leandro Paris	Argentina	1:49.18	
9	Luis Viafara	Colombia	1:49.69	
10	Julián Gaviola	Argentina	1:50.98	
11	Gerson Montes de Oca	Ecuador	1:52.94	
12	Antoliano Arrua	Paraguay	2:00.82	

=== 1500 meters ===
28 July

Rank	Name	Nationality	Time	Notes
1st place, gold medalist(s)	Diego Lacamoire	Argentina	3:47.99	
2nd place, silver medalist(s)	Guilherme Kurtz	Brazil	3:48.11	
3rd place, bronze medalist(s)	Andre Sales	Brazil	3:49.24	
4	Luis Viafara	Colombia	3:49.27	
5	Gerson Montes de Oca	Ecuador	3:50.66	
6	Eduardo Gregorio	Uruguay	3:52.62	
7	Alfredo Toledo	Chile	3:53.73	
8	Ericky Manoel	Paraguay	4:05.22	
9	José Zabala	Argentina	4:08.86	
10	Diego Uribe	Chile	4:20.25	

=== 5000 meters ===
30 July

Rank	Name	Nationality	Time	Notes
1st place, gold medalist(s)	Valentín Soca	Uruguay	13:55.42	
2nd place, silver medalist(s)	Julian Molina	Argentina	13:55.75	
3rd place, bronze medalist(s)	Altobelli da Silva	Brazil	13:55.91	
4	Diego Arévalo	Ecuador	14:04.05	
5	Ignacio Velázquez	Chile	14:14.44	
6	Martín Cuestas	Uruguay	14:18.51	
7	Wendell Souza	Brazil	14:33.28	
	Carlos San Martín	Colombia	DNF	
	Diego Uribe	Chile	DNF	
	José Zabala	Argentina	DNF	
	Julio Palomino	Peru	DNF	

=== 10,000 meters ===
28 July

Rank	Name	Nationality	Time	Notes
1st place, gold medalist(s)	Carlos Díaz	Chile	28:57.18	
2nd place, silver medalist(s)	Ignacio Velázquez	Chile	29:00.91	
3rd place, bronze medalist(s)	Diego Arévalo	Ecuador	29:10.79	
4	José Luis Rojas	Peru	29:15.91	
5	Ignacio Erario	Argentina	29:23.77	
6	Luis Ostos	Peru	29:27.73	
7	Martín Cuestas	Uruguay	30:04.90	
8	Edgar Chávez	Argentina	32:23.42	
	Wendell Souza	Brazil	DNF	
	Altobelli da Silva	Brazil	DNF	
	Valentín Soca	Uruguay	DNF	
	Mauricio González	Colombia	DNF	

=== 110 meters hurdles ===
Heats – 30 July
Wind:
Heat 1: +0.4 m/s, Heat 2: -1.1 m/s

Rank	Heat	Name	Nationality	Time	Notes
1	1	Eduardo de Deus	Brazil	13.58	Q
2	1	Brayan Rojas	Colombia	13.76	Q
3	2	Denner da Silva	Brazil	14.00	Q
4	2	Martín Sáenz	Chile	14.03	Q
5	1	Mauricio Garrido	Peru	14.11	Q
6	1	Juan Pablo Germain	Chile	14.16	q
7	2	Renzo Cremaschi	Argentina	14.21	Q
8	2	Marcos Herrera	Ecuador	14.24	q
9	1	Kevin Mendieta	Paraguay	14.57	

Final – 30 July
Wind:
-0.9 m/s

Rank	Lane	Name	Nationality	Time	Notes
1st place, gold medalist(s)	4	Eduardo de Deus	Brazil	13.59	
2nd place, silver medalist(s)	6	Brayan Rojas	Colombia	13.72	
3rd place, bronze medalist(s)	5	Martín Sáenz	Chile	13.76	
4	3	Denner da Silva	Brazil	13.84	
5	2	Renzo Cremaschi	Argentina	14.04	
6	1	Juan Pablo Germain	Chile	14.06	
7	8	Marcos Herrera	Ecuador	14.21	
	7	Mauricio Garrido	Peru	DQ	R168.6(b)

=== 400 meters hurdles ===
30 July

Rank	Lane	Name	Nationality	Time	Notes
1st place, gold medalist(s)	4	Matheus Lima	Brazil	49.44	
2nd place, silver medalist(s)	5	Bruno de Genaro	Argentina	50.35	
3rd place, bronze medalist(s)	8	Cristóbal Muñoz	Chile	50.89	
4	6	Márcio Teles	Brazil	50.91	
5	3	Diego Courbis	Chile	51.55	
6	2	Iván Eduardo Britez	Paraguay	56.40	
	1	Julio Rodríguez	Venezuela	DQ	
	7	Damián Moretta	Argentina	DNF	

=== 3000 meters steeplechase ===
29 July

Rank	Name	Nationality	Time	Notes
1st place, gold medalist(s)	Julian Molina	Argentina	8:36.47	
2nd place, silver medalist(s)	Carlos San Martín	Colombia	8:39.23	
3rd place, bronze medalist(s)	Julio Palomino	Peru	8:48.93	
4	Mauricio Valdivia	Chile	8:56.77	
5	Diddier Rodríguez	Panama	9:01.68	
6	Matheus Borges	Brazil	9:09.07	
7	Vinícius Alves	Brazil	9:10.76	
8	Jimmy Gómez	Ecuador	9:32.48	
9	Carlos Augusto Johnson	Argentina	9:48.28	

=== 4 × 100 meters relay ===
29 July

Rank	Lane	Nation	Competitors	Time	Notes
1st place, gold medalist(s)	5	Brazil	Paulo André de Oliveira, Felipe Bardi, Erik Cardoso, Rodrigo do Nascimento	38.70	
2nd place, silver medalist(s)	8	Paraguay	Jonathan Wolk, Misael Zalazar, Fredy Maidana, César Almirón	39.25	NR
3rd place, bronze medalist(s)	4	Venezuela	David Vivas, Rafael Vásquez, Alexis Nieves, Bryant Alamo	39.55	
4	6	Argentina	Daniel Londero, Bautista Diamante, Juan Ignacio Ciampitti, Franco Florio	39.85	=NR
5	7	Ecuador	Katriel Angulo, Anderson Marquinez, Steeven Salas, Roy Chila	40.85	
	3	Colombia	Jhonny Rentería, Bernardo Baloyes, Carlos Palacios, Neiker Abello	DNF	

=== 4 × 400 meters relay ===
30 July

Rank	Lane	Nation	Competitors	Time	Notes
1st place, gold medalist(s)	5	Venezuela	Javier Gómez, Julio Rodríguez, Kelvis Padrino, José Maita	3:04.14	
2nd place, silver medalist(s)	8	Brazil	Vitor Hugo dos Santos, Lucas Carvalho, Maxsuel Santana, Douglas da Silva	3:04.15	
3rd place, bronze medalist(s)	7	Argentina	Pedro Emmert, Bruno de Genaro, Julián Gaviola, Elián Larregina	3:05.76	
4	2	Colombia	Jhon Solís, Raúl Mena, Gustavo Barrios, Jhon Perlaza	3:06.63	
5	4	Ecuador	Steeven Salas, Alan Minda, Lenin Sánchez, Francisco Guerrero	3:08.07	
6	6	Chile	Cristóbal Muñoz, Rafael Muñoz, Diego Courbis, Martin Zabala	3:14.96	

=== 20,000 meters walk ===
29 July

Rank	Name	Nationality	Time	Notes
1st place, gold medalist(s)	Luis Henry Campos	Peru	1:21:25.6	
2nd place, silver medalist(s)	Jhonatan Amores	Ecuador	1:21:42.9	
3rd place, bronze medalist(s)	Max dos Santos	Brazil	1:23:21.7	
4	Juan Manuel Cano	Argentina	1:24:01.1	
5	Luca Mazzo	Brazil	1:25:10.0	
6	Yassir Cabrera	Panama	1:25:55.6	NR
7	Kevin Cahuana	Peru	1:28:55.0	
8	Yohan Melillán	Chile	1:37:07.0	
	Mateo Romero	Colombia	DNF	

=== High jump ===
30 July

Rank	Name	Nationality	1.95	2.00	2.05	2.10	2.13	2.16	2.19	2.21	2.23	2.26	Result	Notes
1st place, gold medalist(s)	Carlos Layoy	Argentina	–	–	o	o	o	o	o	o	xo	xx	2.23	=SB
2nd place, silver medalist(s)	Fernando Ferreira	Brazil	–	–	–	o	o	o	o	o	xxx		2.21	
3rd place, bronze medalist(s)	Talles Silva	Brazil	–	o	o	o	xxo	xxx					2.13	
4	Gilmar Correa	Colombia	–	–	o	xo	xxx						2.10	
5	Pedro Alamos	Chile	–	–	o	xxx							2.05	
6	Tichani Sake	Suriname	o	xxx									1.95	

=== Pole vault ===
28 July

Rank	Name	Nationality	4.60	4.80	5.00	5.10	5.20	5.30	5.35	5.40	5.45	5.50	5.55	5.65	Result	Notes
1st place, gold medalist(s)	Germán Chiaraviglio	Argentina	–	–	–	–	xo	–	o	–	o	–	xo	xxx	5.55	
2nd place, silver medalist(s)	Dyander Pacho	Ecuador	–	–	o	–	o	xo	xx–	o	xx–	x			5.40	
3rd place, bronze medalist(s)	Ricardo Montes de Oca	Venezuela	–	–	–	–	o	xxo	–	xxo	–	xxx			5.40	=NR, =NU20R
4	Augusto Dutra de Oliveira	Brazil	–	xo	xxo	–	xo	–	–	xxo	–	xxx			5.40	
5	Lucas Alisson	Brazil	–	o	xxo	–	xo	xo	xo	xxx					5.35	PB
6	Guillermo Correa	Chile	–	o	xxo	–	xo	xxx							5.20	
7	Daniel Zupeuc	Chile	xxo	o	xxo	xx–	o	xxx							5.20	
8	Austin Ramos	Ecuador	–	o	o	–	xxo	xxx							5.20	
	José Tomás Nieto	Colombia	–	–	–	xxx									NM	

=== Long jump ===
28 July

Rank	Name	Nationality	#1	#2	#3	#4	#5	#6	Result	Notes
1st place, gold medalist(s)	Emiliano Lasa	Uruguay	7.79	7.99	8.02	8.08	x	x	8.08	
2nd place, silver medalist(s)	Lucas dos Santos	Brazil	x	7.61	2.57	7.61	x	7.83	7.83	
3rd place, bronze medalist(s)	José Luis Mandros	Peru	x	7.76	x	x	x	x	7.76	
5	Wesley Beraldo	Brazil	7.17	7.54	7.47	7.69	x	7.32	7.69	
6	Vicente Belgeri	Chile	7.55	7.33	x	x	7.62	7.31	7.62	
7	Leodan Torrealba	Venezuela	7.16	7.07	7.26	x	7.26	7.35	7.35	
8	Adrián Alvarado	Panama	x	7.28	5.31	7.25	x	x	7.28	
9	Lutalo Boyce	Guyana	7.20	7.20	7.01				7.20	
10	Brian López	Argentina	7.16	7.15	x				7.16	
11	Alexander Villalba	Paraguay	7.12	6.99	x				7.12	
12	Luciano Ferrari	Argentina	7.07	6.89	6.96				7.07	
13	Roy Jair Chila	Ecuador	6.98	6.64	7.01				7.01	
14	Luis Reyes	Chile	6.93	x	x				6.93	
15	Marco Ponce	Ecuador	6.91	6.91	x				6.91	
16	Juan Gabriel Lugo	Paraguay	x	6.66	x				6.66	
17	Jhon Berrío	Colombia	x	x	6.56				6.56	
–	Arnovis Dalmero	Colombia	8.06	x	5.91	8.07	8.29	–	NM	DQ

=== Triple jump ===
28 July

Rank	Name	Nationality	#1	#2	#3	#4	#5	#6	Result	Notes
1st place, gold medalist(s)	Almir dos Santos	Brazil	16.78	x	17.24	r			17.24	CR
2nd place, silver medalist(s)	Geiner Moreno	Colombia	x	16.43	16.58	x	16.52	16.31	16.58	
3rd place, bronze medalist(s)	Leodan Torrealba	Venezuela	16.37	16.33	16.10	16.52	16.51	16.03	16.52	
4	Steeven Palacios	Ecuador	15.80	x	x	16.06	x	16.26	16.26	
5	Luis Reyes	Chile	15.38	x	16.23	14.44	x	16.03	16.23	
6	Mateus de Sá	Brazil	x	x	15.69	13.83	15.94	15.90	15.94	
7	Doniquel Werson	Suriname	15.05	x	15.88	14.84	x	x	15.88	
8	Maximiliano Díaz	Argentina	15.81	15.38	15.66	x	15.86	14.62	15.86	
9	Frixon Chila	Ecuador	15.08	15.48	x				15.48	
10	Manuel Cuesta	Colombia	14.74	14.89	–				14.89	

=== Shot put ===
30 July

Rank	Name	Nationality	#1	#2	#3	#4	#5	#6	Result	Notes
1st place, gold medalist(s)	Welington Morais	Brazil	20.20	20.59	20.24	20.14	19.93	x	20.59	
2nd place, silver medalist(s)	Nazareno Sasia	Argentina	18.25	18.98	x	19.75	x	19.67	19.75	
3rd place, bronze medalist(s)	Willian Dourado	Brazil	18.96	19.45	19.27	19.19	19.30	19.35	19.45	
4	Ignacio Carballo	Argentina	18.56	18.94	x	18.63	17.94	18.31	18.94	
5	Flies Matias Puschel	Chile	16.26	16.11	x	17.65	17.32	17.11	17.65	
6	José Joaquin Ballivian	Chile	x	16.75	x	17.26	x	17.28	17.28	

=== Discus throw ===
29 July

Rank	Name	Nationality	#1	#2	#3	#4	#5	#6	Result	Notes
1st place, gold medalist(s)	Claudio Romero	Chile	20.20	20.59	20.24	20.14	19.93	x	63.24	
2nd place, silver medalist(s)	Juan José Caicedo	Ecuador	59.24	60.91	61.96	x	x	62.46	62.46	
3rd place, bronze medalist(s)	Mauricio Ortega	Colombia	56.07	57.14	60.15	x	x	x	60.15	
4	Lucas Nervi	Chile	59.64	x	59.34	x	58.82	x	59.64	
5	Wellinton da Cruz Filho	Brazil	57.14	58.07	58.95	x	x	x	58.95	
6	Alan de Falchi	Brazil	57.17	56.81	x	x	58.92	58.71	58.92	
7	Juan Ignacio Solito	Argentina	51.63	47.29	53.06	50.57	53.63	51.86	53.63	

=== Hammer throw ===
28 July

Rank	Name	Nationality	#1	#2	#3	#4	#5	#6	Result	Notes
1st place, gold medalist(s)	Humberto Mansilla	Chile	74.56	74.52	75.92	x	72.52	75.41	75.92	CR
2nd place, silver medalist(s)	Gabriel Kehr	Chile	72.74	74.38	74.21	75.48	74.46	75.57	75.57	
3rd place, bronze medalist(s)	Joaquín Gómez	Argentina	69.44	73.77	x	x	73.27	x	73.77	
4	Allan Wolski	Brazil	69.58	x	68.95	x	x	67.51	69.58	
5	Elías Díaz	Colombia	x	63.01	59.36	66.76	63.98	x	66.76	
6	Alencar Pereira	Brazil	x	x	x	62.82	65.87	x	65.87	

=== Javelin throw ===
30 July

Rank	Name	Nationality	#1	#2	#3	#4	#5	#6	Result	Notes
1st place, gold medalist(s)	Pedro Henrique Rodrigues	Brazil	78.62	77.74	76.72	80.26	x	74.37	80.26	
2nd place, silver medalist(s)	Billy Julio	Colombia	71.71	78.72	76.64	77.68	x	71.82	78.72	
3rd place, bronze medalist(s)	Luiz Maurício da Silva	Brazil	68.77	71.66	77.15	x	73.91	77.17	77.17	
4	Lars Anthony Flaming	Paraguay	65.23	68.75	69.75	71.34	67.62	72.93	72.93	
5	José Escobar	Ecuador	68.14	72.04	68.83	69.79	x	x	72.04	
6	Antonio Ortiz	Paraguay	69.57	x	67.03	x	x	62.40	69.57	
7	Jonathan Cedeño	Panama	68.18	66.16	65.06	61.93	67.08	64.99	68.18	

=== Decathlon ===
28–29 July

The highest mark recorded in each event is highlighted in yellow

Rank	Athlete	Nationality	100m	LJ	SP	HJ	400m	110m H	DT	PV	JT	1500m	Points	Notes
1st place, gold medalist(s)	José Fernando Ferreira	Brazil	10.91	7.16	13.46	1.90	49.13	14.00	45.61	4.90	67.83	4:58.04	8058	CR
2nd place, silver medalist(s)	Santiago Ford	Chile	11.11	7.39	13.47	2.05	50.11	14.52	46.68	4.10	67.46	5:03.44	7845	
3rd place, bronze medalist(s)	Gerson Izaguirre	Venezuela	11.00	7.30	14.64	1.90	50.19	14.02	41.74	4.50	53.31	4:55.49	7691	
4	Andy Preciado	Ecuador	11.14	6.22	15.52	1.96	52.75	14.28	50.57	4.60	62.11	5:01.31	7679	
5	Lucas Catanhede	Brazil	10.82	7.52	12.30	1.93	51.13	14.44	36.07	4.30	47.86	4:25.66	7504	
6	Julio Angulo	Colombia	10.98	6.98	12.62	1.90	49.80	14.80	39.08	3.40	45.76	5:08.74	6869	
7	Elmer Díaz	Colombia	11.16	6.87	13.34	1.78	53.81	15.99	39.13	4.20	40.74	DNF	6060	

- ^{100 metres} Original gold medalist Issam Asinga, Suriname, disqualified and stripped of gold medal following a positive test for a banned substance that occurred on July 18, 2023.
- ^{200 metres} Original gold medalist Issam Asinga, Suriname, disqualified and stripped of gold medal following a positive test for a banned substance that occurred on July 18, 2023.

== Women's results ==
=== 100 meters ===
Heats – 28 July
Wind:
Heat 1: +1.2 m/s, Heat 2: +0.2 m/s

Rank	Heat	Name	Nationality	Time	Notes
1	2	Lorraine Martins	Brazil	11.23	Q
2	1	Vitoria Cristina Rosa	Brazil	11.27	Q
3	1	Ángela Tenorio	Ecuador	11.36	Q
4	2	Aimara Nazareno	Ecuador	11.46	Q
5	1	Natalia Linares	Colombia	11.50	Q
6	2	Anaís Hernández	Chile	11.55	Q
7	1	María Florencia Lamboglia	Argentina	11.58	q
8	2	María Victoria Woodward	Argentina	11.60	q
9	2	Angélica Gamboa	Colombia	11.67	
10	1	Leticia Arispe	Bolivia	11.73	
11	1	Javiera Cañas	Chile	11.81	
12	1	Paula Daruich	Peru	11.83	
12	2	Macarena Giménez	Paraguay	11.83	
14	2	Xenia Hiebert	Paraguay	11.93	
15	1	Martina Coronato	Uruguay	12.00	
16	2	Guadalupe Torrez	Bolivia	14.19	

Final – 28 July
Wind:
+0.7 m/s

Rank	Lane	Name	Nationality	Time	Notes
1st place, gold medalist(s)	4	Vitoria Cristina Rosa	Brazil	11.17	=CR
2nd place, silver medalist(s)	3	Ángela Tenorio	Ecuador	11.30	
3rd place, bronze medalist(s)	5	Aimara Nazareno	Ecuador	11.38	
4	7	Natalia Linares	Colombia	11.43	
5	2	Anaís Hernández	Chile	11.46	
6	1	María Victoria Woodward	Argentina	11.47	
7	8	María Florencia Lamboglia	Argentina	11.60	
	6	Lorraine Martins	Brazil	DNF	

=== 200 meters ===
Heats – 30 July
Wind:
Heat 1: -0.2 m/s, Heat 2: -0.2 m/s

Rank	Heat	Name	Nationality	Time	Notes
1	2	Ana Carolina Azevedo	Brazil	23.44	Q
2	2	Nicole Caicedo	Ecuador	23.54	Q
3	1	Aimara Nazareno	Ecuador	23.59	Q
4	2	Shary Vallecilla	Colombia	23.61	Q
5	2	María Florencia Lamboglia	Argentina	23.67	q
6	1	Martina Weil	Chile	23.80	Q
7	1	Melany Bolaño	Colombia	23.84	Q
8	1	María Victoria Woodward	Argentina	24.55	q
9	1	Bárbara Leôncio	Brazil	24.59	
10	1	Leticia Arispe	Bolivia	24.73	
11	2	Alinny Delgadillo	Bolivia	24.75	
12	1	Martina Coronato	Uruguay	25.36	
13	2	Ruth Báez	Paraguay	25.64	

Final – 30 July
Wind:
+2.0 m/s

Rank	Lane	Name	Nationality	Time	Notes
1st place, gold medalist(s)	5	Nicole Caicedo	Ecuador	22.81	PB
2nd place, silver medalist(s)	4	Shary Vallecilla	Colombia	23.07	
3rd place, bronze medalist(s)	7	Ana Carolina Azevedo	Brazil	23.13	
4	8	Martina Weil	Chile	23.16	
5	6	Aimara Nazareno	Ecuador	23.42	
6	3	Melany Bolaño	Colombia	23.77	
7	1	María Florencia Lamboglia	Argentina	23.92	
	2	María Victoria Woodward	Argentina	DNS	

=== 400 meters ===
Heats – 29 July

Rank	Heat	Name	Nationality	Time	Notes
1	2	Evelis Aguilar	Colombia	52.68	Q
2	1	Nicole Caicedo	Ecuador	53.32	Q
3	2	Tiffani Marinho	Brazil	53.56	Q
4	1	Martina Weil	Chile	53.84	Q
5	1	Tábata de Carvalho	Brazil	54.08	Q
6	1	Jennifer Padilla	Colombia	54.80	q
7	2	Virginia Villalba	Ecuador	55.24	Q
8	1	Cecilia Gómez	Bolivia	55.29	q
9	2	Noelia Martínez	Argentina	55.67	
10	2	Poulette Cardoch	Chile	55.87	
11	2	Mariana Arce	Bolivia	57.10	
12	1	Camila Roffo	Argentina	57.28	
13	2	Montserrath Gauto	Paraguay	59.47	
14	1	Briza Dure	Paraguay	1:00.15	

Final – 29 July

Rank	Lane	Name	Nationality	Time	Notes
1st place, gold medalist(s)	5	Martina Weil	Chile	51.11	CR
2nd place, silver medalist(s)	7	Evelis Aguilar	Colombia	51.41	
3rd place, bronze medalist(s)	4	Nicole Caicedo	Ecuador	51.53	NR
4	6	Tiffani Marinho	Brazil	51.83	
5	8	Tábata de Carvalho	Brazil	53.63	
6	1	Jennifer Padilla	Colombia	54.29	
7	3	Virginia Villalba	Ecuador	54.86	
8	2	Cecilia Gómez	Bolivia	55.37	

=== 800 meters ===
30 July

Rank	Name	Nationality	Time	Notes
1st place, gold medalist(s)	Flávia de Lima	Brazil	2:01.82	
2nd place, silver medalist(s)	Déborah Rodríguez	Uruguay	2:03.94	
3rd place, bronze medalist(s)	Berdine Castillo	Chile	2:04.16	
4	Jaqueline Weber	Brazil	2:04.87	
5	Andrea Calderón	Ecuador	2:05.68	
6	Martina Escudero	Argentina	2:05.83	
7	Leidy Sinisterra	Colombia	2:08.83	
8	Tania Guasace	Bolivia	2:11.54	
9	Evangelina Thomas	Argentina	2:22.08	
	Rosangélica Escobar	Colombia	DQ	

=== 1500 meters ===
28 July

Rank	Name	Nationality	Time	Notes
1st place, gold medalist(s)	Fedra Luna	Argentina	4:14.52	
2nd place, silver medalist(s)	July da Silva	Brazil	4:16.11	
3rd place, bronze medalist(s)	María Pía Fernández	Uruguay	4:16.78	
4	Jaqueline Weber	Brazil	4:18.10	
5	Carmen Alder	Ecuador	4:24.15	
6	Andrea Calderón	Ecuador	4:25.11	
7	Josefa Paz	Chile	4:26.12	
8	Shellcy Sarmiento	Colombia	4:33.46	
9	Javiera Faletto	Chile	4:40.92	
	Mariana Borelli	Argentina	DNF	

=== 5000 meters ===
30 July

Rank	Name	Nationality	Time	Notes
1st place, gold medalist(s)	Fedra Luna	Argentina	16:06.00	
2nd place, silver medalist(s)	Thalia Valdivia	Peru	16:12.45	
3rd place, bronze medalist(s)	Muriel Coneo	Colombia	16:20.82	
4	Simone Ferraz	Brazil	16:31.53	
5	Giselle Álvarez	Chile	16:46.57	
6	Carolina Lozano	Argentina	16:52.85	
7	Zeyli Quintanilla	Peru	17:57.06	

=== 10,000 meters ===
28 July

Rank	Name	Nationality	Time	Notes
1st place, gold medalist(s)	Luz Mery Rojas	Peru	34:25.0	
2nd place, silver medalist(s)	Thalia Valdivia	Peru	34:26.0	
3rd place, bronze medalist(s)	Daiana Ocampo	Argentina	34:28.2	
4	Silvia Ortiz	Ecuador	34:32.1	
5	Muriel Coneo	Colombia	34:35.0	
6	Rosa Chacha	Ecuador	35:06.0	
7	Jennifer Silva	Brazil	35:46.5	
8	Giselle Álvarez	Chile	35:49.9	
9	Maria Lucineida da Silva	Brazil	35:58.0	
10	Tania Moser	Bolivia	36:14.0	
11	Marcela Gómez	Argentina	36:46.2	

=== 100 meters hurdles ===
Heats – 30 July
Wind:
Heat 1: -0.4 m/s, Heat 2: 0.0 m/s

Rank	Heat	Name	Nationality	Time	Notes
1	1	Micaela de Mello	Brazil	13.41	Q
2	2	Caroline Tomaz	Brazil	13.48	Q
3	1	María Ignacia Eguiguren	Chile	13.94	Q
4	2	María Alejandra Rocha	Colombia	14.02	Q
5	2	Elisa Keitel	Chile	14.24	Q
6	2	Leyka Archibold	Panama	14.67	q
7	1	Millie Díaz	Uruguay	15.02	Q
8	1	Rossmary Paredes	Paraguay	15.10	q
9	2	Cecilia Milagros	Paraguay	17.21	

Final – 30 July
Wind:
+0.3 m/s

Rank	Lane	Name	Nationality	Time	Notes
1st place, gold medalist(s)	5	Caroline Tomaz	Brazil	13.26	
2nd place, silver medalist(s)	4	Micaela de Mello	Brazil	13.34	
3rd place, bronze medalist(s)	6	María Ignacia Eguiguren	Chile	13.81	
4	3	María Alejandra Rocha	Colombia	13.83	
5	7	Elisa Keitel	Chile	14.02	
6	8	Leyka Archibold	Panama	14.52	
7	1	Rossmary Paredes	Paraguay	14.98	
8	2	Millie Díaz	Uruguay	15.29	

=== 400 meters hurdles ===
30 July

Rank	Lane	Name	Nationality	Time	Notes
1st place, gold medalist(s)	5	Chayenne da Silva	Brazil	55.90	
2nd place, silver medalist(s)	7	Bianca dos Santos	Brazil	57.30	
3rd place, bronze medalist(s)	6	Valeria Cabezas	Colombia	57.31	
4	4	Virginia Villalba	Ecuador	57.46	
5	8	Leyka Archibold	Panama	1:03.81	
	3	Fatima Amarilla	Paraguay	DNF	

=== 3000 meters steeplechase ===
29 July

Rank	Name	Nationality	Time	Notes
1st place, gold medalist(s)	Tatiane Raquel da Silva	Brazil	9:55.73	
2nd place, silver medalist(s)	Simone Ferraz	Brazil	9:59.44	
3rd place, bronze medalist(s)	Clara Baiocchi	Argentina	10:19.71	
4	María José Calfilaf	Chile	10:23.92	NR
5	Carolina Lozano	Argentina	10:25.71	
6	Stefany López	Colombia	10:31.17	
7	Tania Moser	Bolivia	10:46.72	
8	Yajaira Rubio	Colombia	10:48.62	
9	Rolanda Bell	Panama	11:18.74	
10	Maria Hortensia Caballero	Paraguay	11:33.59	

=== 4 × 100 meters relay ===
29 July

Rank	Lane	Nation	Competitors	Time	Notes
1st place, gold medalist(s)	3	Brazil	Ana Carolina Azevedo, Vitoria Cristina Rosa, Bárbara Leôncio, Rosângela Santos	43.47	
2nd place, silver medalist(s)	4	Colombia	Evelyn Rivera, Angélica Gamboa, Shary Vallecilla, Melany Bolaño	44.18	
3rd place, bronze medalist(s)	7	Chile	Viviana Olivares, Isidora Jiménez, Anaís Hernández, Javiera Cañas	44.40	NR
4	6	Argentina	Sofia Casetta, María Florencia Lamboglia, Belén Fritzche, María Victoria Woodward	45.14	
5	8	Bolivia	Lauren Mendoza, Leticia Arispe, Alinny Delgadillo, Valeria Quispe	46.89	
	5	Paraguay	Ruth Andrea Baez, Macarena Giménez, Briza Dure, Xenia Hiebert	DNF	

=== 4 × 400 meters relay ===
30 July

Rank	Lane	Nation	Competitors	Time	Notes
1st place, gold medalist(s)	5	Colombia	Lina Licona, Valeria Cabezas, Jennifer Padilla, Evelis Aguilar	3:31.39	
2nd place, silver medalist(s)	4	Brazil	Jainy Barreto, Julia Aparecida Ribeiro, Daysiellen Atla Dias, Tiffani Marinho	3:31.63	
3rd place, bronze medalist(s)	8	Chile	Poulette Cardoch, Berdine Castillo, Anaís Hernández, Martina Weil	3:35.39	
4	7	Ecuador	Virginia Villalba, Andrea Calderón, Aimara Nazareno, Nicole Caicedo	3:46.43	
5	2	Bolivia	Lucía Sotomayor, Cecilia Gómez, Tania Guasace, Mariana Arce	3:48.77	
6	3	Argentina	Noelia Martínez, Evangelina Thomas, Martina Escudero, Camila Roffo	3:53.15	

=== 20,000 meters walk ===
29 July

Rank	Name	Nationality	Time	Notes
1st place, gold medalist(s)	Mary Luz Andía	Peru	1:29:07.5	CR, AR, WL
2nd place, silver medalist(s)	Paula Milena Torres	Ecuador	1:33:06.1	
3rd place, bronze medalist(s)	Gabriela Muniz	Brazil	1:33:31.8	
4	Ángela Castro	Bolivia	1:35:21.1	
5	Mayra Quispe	Bolivia	1:35:29.6	
6	Natalia Pulido	Colombia	1:36:30.5	
7	Yoci Caballero	Peru	1:41:07.6	
8	Gabrielly dos Santos	Brazil	1:43:35.7	
9	Anastasia Sanzana	Chile	1:47:24.4	

=== High jump ===
29 July

Rank	Name	Nationality	1.65	1.70	1.75	1.78	1.81	1.84	1.87	Result	Notes
1st place, gold medalist(s)	Valdileia Martins	Brazil	–	–	o	o	o	o	xxx	1.84	
2nd place, silver medalist(s)	María Arboleda	Colombia	o	–	xo	o	xxx			1.78	
3rd place, bronze medalist(s)	Jennifer Rodríguez	Colombia	–	o	xxo	o	xxx			1.78	
4	Maria Eduarda Barbosa	Brazil	–	–	o	xx–	x			1.75	
5	Lorena Aires	Uruguay	–	o	xxx					1.70	
6	Joyce Micolta	Ecuador	xo	o	xxx					1.70	

=== Pole vault ===
28 July

Rank	Name	Nationality	3.20	3.40	3.60	3.80	3.90	4.00	4.15	4.20	4.25	4.30	4.40	4.50	4.60	4.73	Result	Notes
1st place, gold medalist(s)	Juliana Campos	Brazil	–	–	–	–	–	o	o	–	–	xo	o	o	xxo	xxx	4.60	
2nd place, silver medalist(s)	Robeilys Peinado	Venezuela	–	–	–	–	–	–	–	xo	–	xo	o	o	xxx		4.50	
3rd place, bronze medalist(s)	Katherine Castillo	Colombia	–	–	–	–	–	o	–	xxo	x–	xx					4.20	
4	Isabel de Quadros	Brazil	–	–	–	–	xo	xo	xxx								4.00	
5	Luciana Gómez	Argentina	–	–	xo	xxx											3.60	
6	Antonia Crestani	Chile	–	o	xxx												3.40	
7	Josefina Britez	Paraguay	o	xxx													3.20	

=== Long jump ===
30 July

Rank	Name	Nationality	#1	#2	#3	#4	#5	#6	Result	Notes
1st place, gold medalist(s)	Eliane Martins	Brazil	6.49	6.62	x	x	x	x	6.62	
2nd place, silver medalist(s)	Lissandra Campos	Brazil	6.32	x	x	x	x	x	6.32	
3rd place, bronze medalist(s)	Yuliana Angulo	Ecuador	6.26	6.21	6.19	x	6.20	6.19	6.26	
4	Angie Palacios	Colombia	6.08	6.09	6.18	x	5.98	5.95	6.18	
5	Rocío Muñoz	Chile	5.88	6.01	6.02	x	x	6.07	6.07	
6	Valeria Quispe	Bolivia	5.62	5.72	x	5.70	5.80	5.70	5.80	
7	Estrella Lobo	Colombia	5.73	5.58	5.75	5.48	r		5.75	
8	Noelia Vera	Paraguay	5.30	5.52	5.40	5.54	5.38	5.54	5.54	
9	Luciana Roman	Paraguay	5.02	5.00	5.09				5.09	
	Nathalee Aranda	Panama	r						DNS	

=== Triple jump ===
28 July

Rank	Name	Nationality	#1	#2	#3	#4	#5	#6	Result	Notes
1st place, gold medalist(s)	Gabriele dos Santos	Brazil	13.66	x	13.92	x	–	13.74	13.92	
2nd place, silver medalist(s)	Estrella Lobo	Colombia	x	12.96	13.54	12.93	13.08	x	13.54	PB
3rd place, bronze medalist(s)	Adriana Chila	Ecuador	13.03	x	12.33	13.25	13.42	11.39	13.42	
4	Mairy Pires	Venezuela	13.06	x	13.27	13.38	13.31	x	13.38	
5	Liuba Zaldívar	Ecuador	13.33	x	x	x	r		13.33	
6	Nerli Cantoñi	Colombia	x	12.94	12.90	12.91	13.18	13.26	13.26	PB
7	Ketllyn Zanette	Brazil	12.72	13.10	x	13.07	13.13	12.92	13.13	
8	Valeria Quispe	Bolivia	12.86	12.70	12.82	13.07	x	12.68	13.07	
9	Millie Díaz	Uruguay	12.37	12.27	12.62				12.62	

=== Shot put ===
28 July

Rank	Name	Nationality	#1	#2	#3	#4	#5	#6	Result	Notes
1st place, gold medalist(s)	Ivana Gallardo	Chile	16.13	17.30	x	17.39	17.17	16.41	17.39	
2nd place, silver medalist(s)	Lívia Avancini	Brazil	x	16.21	16.67	17.04	16.41	16.56	17.04	
3rd place, bronze medalist(s)	Natalia Duco	Chile	16.51	16.93	16.79	16.55	16.42	16.58	16.93	
4	Ahymara Espinoza	Venezuela	15.74	16.66	16.60	16.65	16.57	16.20	16.66	
5	Sandra Lemos	Colombia	16.46	16.54	16.26	16.34	x	16.16	16.54	
6	Ana Caroline da Silva	Brazil	15.66	16.11	x	x	x	x	16.11	
7	Alicia Grootfaam	Suriname	x	13.43	13.43	x	x	x	13.43	

=== Discus throw ===
29 July

Rank	Name	Nationality	#1	#2	#3	#4	#5	#6	Result	Notes
1st place, gold medalist(s)	Izabela da Silva	Brazil	59.81	x	x	61.26	x	60.15	61.26	
2nd place, silver medalist(s)	Karen Gallardo	Chile	56.46	56.09	57.44	58.71	59.91	59.92	59.92	
3rd place, bronze medalist(s)	Andressa de Morais	Brazil	59.37	x	x	x	x	58.82	59.92	
4	Yerlin Mesa	Colombia	51.17	49.86	53.21	50.68	51.82	52.08	53.21	
5	Ailen Armada	Argentina	x	52.16	52.44	x	53.17	52.87	53.17	
6	Catalina Bravo	Chile	40.32	45.71	45.88	x	45.02	45.92	45.92	

=== Hammer throw ===
28 July

Rank	Name	Nationality	#1	#2	#3	#4	#5	#6	Result	Notes
1st place, gold medalist(s)	Rosa Rodríguez	Venezuela	62.32	68.12	x	x	x	x	68.12	
2nd place, silver medalist(s)	Mayra Gaviria	Colombia	62.25	65.13	67.07	64.41	64.15	62.10	67.07	
3rd place, bronze medalist(s)	Ximena Zorrilla	Peru	64.76	65.92	64.77	x	62.55	62.26	65.92	
4	Nereida Santacruz	Ecuador	62.68	61.04	x	x	x	x	62.68	
5	Daniela Gómez	Argentina	60.91	62.36	59.96	56.88	x	59.16	62.36	
6	Ana Caroline Silva	Brazil	57.58	60.58	59.22	x	x	61.91	61.91	
7	Mariana García	Chile	59.30	58.92	59.69	60.87	61.44	58.64	61.44	
8	Mariana Marcelino	Brazil	58.98	59.72	x	x	58.87	59.76	59.76	
9	María del Pilar Piccardo	Paraguay	44.46	x	47.31				47.31	

=== Javelin throw ===
30 July

Rank	Name	Nationality	#1	#2	#3	#4	#5	#6	Result	Notes
1st place, gold medalist(s)	Flor Ruiz	Colombia	59.46	x	x	x	61.82	57.30	61.82	
2nd place, silver medalist(s)	Jucilene de Lima	Brazil	57.71	x	60.68	x	x	x	60.68	
3rd place, bronze medalist(s)	María Lucelly Murillo	Colombia	59.75	x	53.96	x	59.26	58.56	59.75	
4	Juleisy Angulo	Ecuador	55.14	57.64	57.65	58.14	x	x	58.14	
5	Manuela Rotundo	Uruguay	51.43	54.66	50.50	51.59	49.61	49.39	54.66	
6	Laila Ferrer e Silva	Brazil	51.30	53.87	x	x	51.12	x	53.87	
7	María Paz Ríos	Chile	51.95	x	x	52.65	x	51.27	52.65	
8	Laura Paredes	Paraguay	51.02	48.36	x	48.76	x	50.32	51.02	
9	Fiorella Veloso	Paraguay	45.68	48.10	41.88				48.10	

=== Heptathlon ===
29–30 July

The highest mark recorded in each event is highlighted in yellow

Rank	Athlete	Nationality	100m H	HJ	SP	200m	LJ	JT	800m	Points	Notes
1st place, gold medalist(s)	Martha Araújo	Colombia	13.82	1.65	13.69	25.62	6.09	45.03	2:26.22	5785	
2nd place, silver medalist(s)	Tamara de Sousa	Brazil	14.37	1.68	13.79	26.09	5.78	41.68	2:46.12	5314	
3rd place, bronze medalist(s)	María Fernanda Murillo	Colombia	13.99	1.68	9.61	25.51	5.78	37.68	2:32.02	5229	PB
4	Ana Paula Argüello	Paraguay	14.30	1.65	11.00	25.92	5.86	34.24	2:31.34	5170	
5	Joice Micolta	Ecuador	15.03	1.71	11.26	27.04	5.71	37.42	2:25.94	5150	
6	Roberta dos Santos	Brazil	14.94	1.65	12.21	26.86	5.49	33.13	2:39.99	4850	
	Ana Camila Pirelli	Paraguay	16.28	DNS	–	–	–	–	–	DNF	

== Mixed results ==
=== 4 × 400 meters relay ===
28 July

Rank	Lane	Nation	Competitors	Time	Notes
1st place, gold medalist(s)	4	Colombia	Jhon Perlaza, Lina Licona, Anthony Zambrano, Evelis Aguilar	3:14.79	AR, CR
2nd place, silver medalist(s)	6	Brazil	Tiago da Silva, Julia Aparecida Ribeiro, Douglas da Silva, Jainy Barreto	3:18.02	
3rd place, bronze medalist(s)	7	Ecuador	Alan Minda, Anahí Suárez, Francisco Guerrero, Nicole Caicedo	3:24.42	
4	3	Paraguay	Marcos González, Fatima Amarilla, Antoliano Arrua, Montserrath Gauto	3:39.54	
	5	Argentina	Bruno Agustín, Noelia Martínez, Julián Gaviola, Camila Roffo	DNF	
