= Jaqueline Weber =

Brazilian athlete (born 1995)

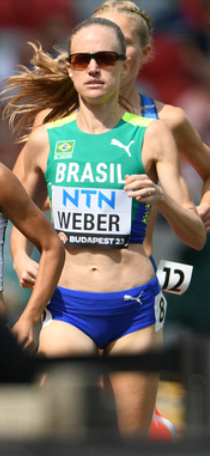

Personal information
- Full name: Jaqueline Beatriz Weber
- Nickname: Jaque
- Born: 6 April 1995 (age 31) Teutônia, Brazil
- Education: Universidade de Santa Cruz do Sul

Sport
- Sport: Athletics
- Events: 800 m, 1500 m

Jaqueline Beatriz Weber (born 6 April 1995) is a Brazilian middle-distance runner. She represented her country at the 2023 World Championships in the 1500 metres without advancing from the first round.

== International competitions ==
Year	Competition	Venue	Position	Event	Notes
Representing Brazil
2012	South American Youth Championships	Mendoza, Argentina	7th	1500 m	4:57.63
2013	South American Junior Championships	Resistencia, Argentina	–	1500 m	DNF
2016	Ibero-American Championships	Rio de Janeiro, Brazil	5th	800 m	2:10.32
2016	South American U23 Championships	Lima, Peru	4th	800 m	2:13.75
2016	South American U23 Championships	Lima, Peru	–	1500 m	DNF
2021	South American Championships	Guayaquil, Ecuador	4th	1500 m	4:18.67
2022	South American Indoor Championships	Cochabamba, Bolivia	2nd	800 m	2:18.58
2022	South American Indoor Championships	Cochabamba, Bolivia	3rd	1500 m	4:49.42
2022	Ibero-American Championships	La Nucía, Spain	6th	800 m	2:05.76
2022	South American Games	Asunción, Paraguay	2nd	800 m	2:08.97
2022	South American Games	Asunción, Paraguay	3rd	1500 m	4:17.50
2023	South American Championships	São Paulo, Brazil	4th	800 m	2:04.87
2023	South American Championships	São Paulo, Brazil	4th	1500 m	4:18.10
2023	World Championships	Budapest, Hungary	52nd (h)	1500 m	4:14.46
2023	World Road Running Championships	Riga, Latvia	24th	1500 m	4:50.11
2023	Pan American Games	Santiago, Chile	4th	800 m	2:04.99
2024	World Indoor Championships	Glasgow, United Kingdom	24th (h)	800 m	2:05.17
2024	Ibero-American Championships	Cuiabá, Brazil	2nd	800 m	2:01.64
2025	South American Indoor Championships	Cochabamba, Bolivia	1st	800 m	2:10.46
2026	Ibero-American Championships	Lima, Peru	4th	1500 m	4:30.00
2026	World Road Running Championships	Copenhagen, Denmark	41st	Road mile	4:57.14

== Personal bests ==
Outdoor

- 800 metres – 2:01.54 (Meilen 2023)
- 1500 metres – 4:14.46 (Budapest 2023)
- 3000 metres – 10:18.61 (Maringa 2014)
- Mile – 4:50.11 (Riga 2023) NR

Indoor

- 800 metres – 2:05.17(Glasgow 2024)
- 1500 metres – 4:49.42 (Cochabamba 2022)
