= Athletics at the 2007 Pan American Games – Men's pole vault =

Men's pole vault at the Pan American Games

The men's pole vault event at the 2007 Pan American Games was held on July 28.

== Results ==
Rank	Athlete	Nationality	4.90	5.05	5.20	5.30	5.40	Result	Notes
1st place, gold medalist(s)	Fábio Gomes da Silva	Brazil	–	–	xo	o	xxo	5.40	
2nd place, silver medalist(s)	Giovanni Lanaro	Mexico	–	–	xo	xxo	xxx	5.30	
3rd place, bronze medalist(s)	Germán Chiaraviglio	Argentina	–	o	o	xx–	x	5.20	
4	Dominic Johnson	Saint Lucia	xxo	–	xxx			4.90	
	Javier Benítez	Argentina	xxx					NM	
	Lázaro Borges	Cuba	–	xxx				NM	
	Derek Miles	United States	–	–	xxx			NM	
	José Francisco Nava	Chile	xxx					NM	
	Robison Pratt	Mexico	–	xxx				NM	
	João Gabriel Sousa	Brazil	xxx					NM	
	Jeremy Scott	United States	xxx					NM	
