= Augusto Dutra de Oliveira =

Brazilian pole vaulter (born 1990)

Augusto Dutra
Personal information
- Full name: Augusto Dutra da Silva de Oliveira
- Born: 16 July 1990 (age 36) Marília, São Paulo, Brazil
- Height: 1.80 m (5 ft 11 in)
- Weight: 70 kg (154 lb)

Sport
- Country: Brazil
- Sport: Athletics
- Event: Pole vault
Medal record
Men's athletics
Representing Brazil
Pan American Games
Silver medal – second place	2019 Lima	Pole vault
South American Games
Gold medal – first place	2010 Medellín	Pole vault
Gold medal – first place	2014 Santiago	Pole vault
Gold medal – first place	2018 Cochabamba	Pole vault
Gold medal – first place	2026 Santa Fe	Pole vault
Bronze medal – third place	2022 Asunción	Pole vault
Ibero-American Championships
Silver medal – second place	2012 Barquisimeto	Pole vault
- Updated on 4 April 2014

Augusto Dutra da Silva de Oliveira (born 16 July 1990) is a Brazilian track and field athlete who competes in the pole vault. He has personal bests of 5.82 metres (outdoor) and 5.71 m (indoors).

Born in Marília in Brazil's São Paulo state, de Oliveira first competed internationally in 2009: he won the South American Junior title with a vault of 4.90 metres and placed fourth at the 2009 Pan American Junior Athletics Championships. His personal best that year was 5.00 m. He began training under Elson Miranda, a former pole vaulter, with the Clube Atletismo BM&F Bovespa.

The following year he took the title at the 2010 South American Games (which doubled as the South American Under-23 Championships). He improved his best to 5.40 metres in May and went on to place second nationally at the Brazilian Athletics Championships. He was fourth at the 2011 South American Championships in Athletics. His 2012 was highlighted by a new personal best of 5.45 m and a silver medal at the 2012 Ibero-American Championships in Athletics.

At the beginning of 2013, he rapidly ascended to the top of the regional rankings. He cleared a South American indoor record of 5.66 m, then another of 5.71 m in March. He won at the Grande Premio Brasil Caixa de Atletismo with an outdoor best of 5.70 m, beating reigning South American champion Fabio Gomes da Silva. Later that week in Uberlândia, he broke da Silva's outdoor continental mark with a vault of 5.81 m.

On 22 June 2013, he broke the South American record again with a 5.82 mark.

He competed at the 2020 Summer Olympics.

== Personal bests ==
- Pole vault: 5.82 m – (Germany) Hof, 22 June 2013

== International competition record ==
Year	Competition	Venue	Position	Notes
Representing Brazil
2009	South American Junior Championships	São Paulo, Brazil	1st	4.90 m
2009	Pan American Junior Championships	Port of Spain, Trinidad and Tobago	4th	4.75 m
2010	South American Games	Medellín, Colombia	1st	5.00 m
2011	South American Championships	Buenos Aires, Argentina	4th	4.90 m
2012	Ibero-American Championships	Barquisimeto, Venezuela	2nd	5.30 m
2013	World Championships	Moscow, Russia	11th	5.65 m
2014	World Indoor Championships	Sopot, Poland	7th	5.65 m
2014	South American Games	Santiago, Chile	1st	5.40 m
2015	South American Championships	Lima, Peru	–	NM
2015	World Championships	Beijing, China	9th	5.65 m
2016	World Indoor Championships	Portland, United States	14th	5.40 m
2016	Ibero-American Championships	Rio de Janeiro, Brazil	2nd	5.30 m
2016	Olympic Games	Rio de Janeiro, Brazil	22nd (q)	5.45 m
2017	South American Championships	Asunción, Paraguay	–	NM
2018	South American Games	Cochabamba, Bolivia	1st	5.50 m
2018	Ibero-American Championships	Trujillo, Peru	1st	5.40 m
2019	South American Championships	Lima, Peru	1st	5.61 m
2019	Pan American Games	Lima, Peru	2nd	5.71 m
2019	World Championships	Doha, Qatar	10th	5.55 m
2021	Olympic Games	Tokyo, Japan	16th (q)	5.65 m
2022	South American Indoor Championships	Cochabamba, Bolivia	1st	5.50 m
2022	World Championships	Eugene, United States	–	NM
2022	South American Games	Asunción, Paraguay	3rd	5.30 m
2023	South American Championships	São Paulo, Brazil	4th	5.40 m
2024	South American Indoor Championships	Cochabamba, Bolivia	–	NM
2026	South American Indoor Championships	Cochabamba, Bolivia	2nd	5.30 m
2026	Ibero-American Championships	Lima, Peru	–	DQ
2026	South American Games	Santa Fe, Argentina	1st	5.40 m
