= List of Pan American Games records in athletics =

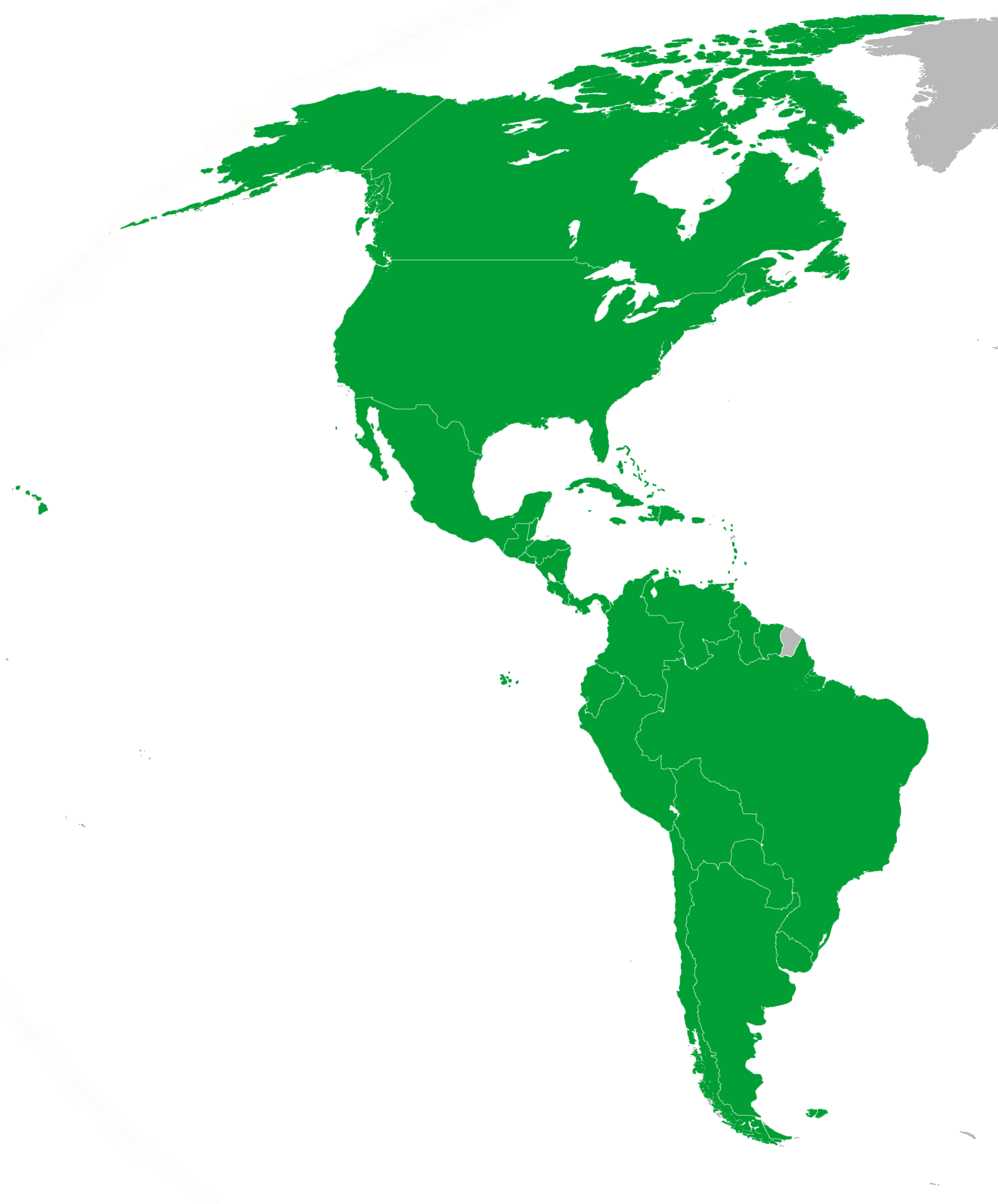
Pan American Games records in athletics are set by athletes competing from a range of member nations of the Panam Sports.

The Pan American Games is a quadrennial event which began in 1951. The Panam Sports accepts only athletes who are representing one of the organisation's member states (most of which are within the Americas) and recognises records set at editions of the Pan American Games. The Games records in athletics are the best marks set in competitions at the Games. The athletics events at the Games are divided into four groups: track events (including sprints, middle- and long-distance running, hurdling and relays), field events (including javelin, discus, hammer, pole vault, long and triple jumps), road events and combined events (the heptathlon and decathlon).

Cuban athlete Ana Fidelia Quirot and Mexican Graciela Mendoza are the only competitors to hold records in two separate events. Quirot is the record holder over both 400 and 800 metres, while Mendoza holds the 10 and 20 kilometre walk records. The 10 km walk event was discontinued after 1995. The two nations that most represented in the record list are Cuba (with 8 male and 10 female record holders) and the United States (with six record holders of each sex. Furthermore, all but one of the records in the defunct athletic events are held by US athletes. Of the other countries, Brazil, Jamaica, and Mexico each have five records.

== Men's records ==
Event	Record	Name	Nationality	Date	Games	Place	Ref.
100 m	10.00 (+0.4 m/s) A	Kim Collins	Saint Kitts and Nevis	24 October 2011	2011 Games	Guadalajara, Mexico	
200 m	19.80 (+2.0 m/s) PB	Rasheed Dwyer	Jamaica	23 July 2015	2015 Games	Toronto, Canada	
400 m	44.45 A	Ronnie Ray	United States	18 October 1975	1975 Games	Mexico City, Mexico	
800 m	1:44.25	Marco Arop	Canada	10 August 2019	2019 Games	Lima, Peru	
1500 m	3:36.32	Hudson de Souza	Brazil	25 July 2007	2007 Games	Rio de Janeiro, Brazil	
5000 m	13:25.60	Ed Moran	United States	23 July 2007	2007 Games	Rio de Janeiro, Brazil	
10,000 m	28:08.74	José David Galván	Mexico	27 July 2007	2007 Games	Rio de Janeiro, Brazil	
Marathon	2:09:31	Cristhian Pacheco	Peru	27 July 2019	2019 Games	Lima, Peru	
110 m hurdles	13.07 (+0.8 m/s)	David Oliver	United States	24 July 2015	2015 Games	Toronto, Canada	
400 m hurdles	47.99 A	Omar Cisneros	Cuba	27 October 2011	2011 Games	Guadalajara, Mexico	
3000 m steeplechase	8:14.41	Wander Moura	Brazil	22 March 1995	1995 Games	Mar del Plata, Argentina	
High jump	2.40 m	Javier Sotomayor	Cuba	25 March 1995	1995 Games	Mar del Plata, Argentina	
Pole vault	5.80 m A	Lázaro Borges	Cuba	28 October 2011	2011 Games	Guadalajara, Mexico	
Pole vault	5.80 m	Shawnacy Barber	Canada	21 July 2015	2015 Games	Toronto, Canada	
Long jump	8.75 m	Carl Lewis	United States	16 August 1987	1987 Games	Indianapolis, United States	
Triple jump	17.89 m A ^{WR}	João Carlos de Oliveira	Brazil	15 October 1975	1975 Games	Mexico City, Mexico	
Shot put	22.07 m	Darlan Romani	Brazil	7 August 2019	2019 Games	Lima, Peru	
Discus throw	67.68 m	Fedrick Dacres	Jamaica	6 August 2019	2019 Games	Lima, Peru	
Hammer throw	80.96 m	Ethan Katzberg	Canada	4 November 2023	2023 Games	Santiago, Chile	
Javelin throw	87.31 m NR	Anderson Peters	Grenada	10 August 2019	2019 Games	Lima, Peru	
Decathlon	8659 pts NR	Damian Warner	Canada	22–23 July 2015	2015 Games	Toronto, Canada	
Decathlon	100m (wind) / Long jump (wind) / Shot put / High jump / 400m / 110m H (wind) / Discus / Pole vault / Javelin / 1500m; 10.28 (+1.4 m/s) / 7.68 m (+2.4 m/s) / 14.36 m / 1.97 m / 47.66 / 13.44 (+2.0 m/s) DB / 47.56 m / 4.60 m / 61.53 m / 4:24.73						
20 km walk (road)	1:19:20	David Hurtado	Ecuador	29 October 2023	2023 Games	Santiago, Chile	
50 km walk (road)	3:47:55	Carlos Mercenario	Mexico	24 March 1995	1995 Games	Mar del Plata, Argentina	
4 × 100 m relay	38.14 NR	Chavaughn Walsh; Daniel Bailey; Cejhae Greene; Miguel Francis	Antigua and Barbuda	24 July 2015	2015 Games	Toronto, Canada	
4 × 400 m relay	2:57.97	Davian Clarke; Michael McDonald; Danny McFarlane; Greg Haughton	Jamaica	30 July 1999	1999 Games	Winnipeg, Canada	

Key:
^{WR} World record	^{AR} Area record	^{NR} National record	^{PB} Athlete's personal best

== Women's records ==
Event	Record	Name	Nationality	Date	Games	Place	Ref.
100 m	10.92 (+1.6 m/s)	Barbara Pierre	United States	21 July 2015	2015 Games	Toronto, Canada	
200 m	22.43 (−0.1 m/s)	Shelly-Ann Fraser-Pryce	Jamaica	9 August 2019	2019 Games	Lima, Peru	
400 m	49.61	Ana Fidelia Quirot	Cuba	5 August 1991	1991 Games	Havana, Cuba	
800 m	1:58.71	Ana Fidelia Quirot	Cuba	8 August 1991	1991 Games	Havana, Cuba	
1500 m	4:05.70	Mary Decker	United States	13 July 1979	1979 Games	San Juan, Puerto Rico	
5000 m	15:30.65	Adriana Fernández	Mexico	6 August 2003	2003 Games	Santo Domingo, Dominican Republic	
10,000 m	31:55.17	Natasha Wodak	Canada	6 August 2019	2019 Games	Lima, Peru	
Marathon	2:27:12	Citlali Cristian	Mexico	22 October 2023	2023 Games	Santiago, Chile	
100 m hurdles	12.52 (+1.4 m/s)	Queen Harrison	United States	21 July 2015	2015 Games	Toronto, Canada	
400 m hurdles	53.44	Daimí Pernía	Cuba	28 July 1999	1999 Games	Winnipeg, Canada	
3000 m steeplechase	9:39.47	Belén Casetta	Argentina	4 November 2023	2023 Games	Santiago, Chile	
High jump	1.96 m	Coleen Sommer	United States	13 August 1987	1987 Games	Indianapolis, United States	
Pole vault	4.85 m	Yarisley Silva	Cuba	23 July 2015	2015 Games	Toronto, Canada	
Long jump	7.45 m	Jackie Joyner-Kersee	United States	13 August 1987	1987 Games	Indianapolis, United States	
Triple jump	15.11 m (+0.6 m/s) NR	Yulimar Rojas	Venezuela	9 August 2019	2019 Games	Lima, Peru	
Shot put	19.55 m NR	Danniel Thomas-Dodd	Jamaica	9 August 2019	2019 Games	Lima, Peru	
Discus throw	66.58 m	Yaime Pérez	Cuba	6 August 2019	2019 Games	Lima, Peru	
Hammer throw	75.62 m A	Yipsi Moreno	Cuba	24 October 2011	2011 Games	Guadalajara, Mexico	
Javelin throw	65.85 m	Osleidys Menéndez	Cuba	27 July 1999	1999 Games	Winnipeg, Canada	
Heptathlon	6332 pts PB	Yorgelis Rodríguez	Cuba	24–25 July 2015	2015 Games	Toronto, Canada	
Heptathlon	100m H (wind) / High jump / Shot put / 200m (wind) / Long jump (wind) / Javelin / 800m; 13.81 (−1.7 m/s) / 1.83 m / 14.14 m / 24.25 (+1.5 m/s) / 6.25 m (−0.4 m/s) / 48.32 m / 2:22.01						
20 km walk (road)	1:28:03	Sandra Arenas	Colombia	4 August 2019	2019 Games	Lima, Peru	
50 km walk (road)	4:11:12	Johana Ordóñez	Ecuador	11 August 2019	2019 Games	Lima, Peru	
4 × 100 m relay	42.58	Barbara Pierre; LaKeisha Lawson; Morolake Akinosun; Kaylin Whitney	United States	25 July 2015	2015 Games	Toronto, Canada	
4 × 400 m relay	3:23.35	Diane Dixon; Rochelle Stevens; Valerie Brisco-Hooks; Denean Howard	United States	16 August 1987	1987 Games	Indianapolis, United States	

Key:
^{WR} World record	^{AR} Area record	^{NR} National record	^{PB} Athlete's personal best

== Statistics ==
=== Totals ===
Records by Games
Edition	No. of records broken
1955	29
1959	?
1963	?
1967	?
1971	?
1975	?
1979	?
1983	?
1987	?
1991	?
1995	?
1999	?
2003	?
2007	13
2011	16
2015	14
2019	14

Records by country
Nation	Male	Female	Total
United States	5	7	12
Cuba	3	8	11
Canada	3	2	5
Jamaica	3	2	5
Brazil	4	0	4
Mexico	3	1	4
Peru	1	1	2
Antigua and Barbuda	1	0	1
Colombia	0	1	1
Ecuador	0	1	1
Grenada	1	0	1
Saint Kitts and Nevis	1	0	1
Venezuela	0	1	1

== Records in defunct events ==
=== Men's events ===
Event	Record	Name	Nation	Games	Notes
10,000 metres track walk	50:26.8	Henry Laskau	United States	1951 Buenos Aires	

=== Women's events ===
Event	Record	Name	Nation	Games	Notes
60 metres	7.4	Isabelle Daniels	United States	1959 Chicago	
3000 metres	9:06.75	Mary Knisely	United States	1987 Games	
10,000 metres track walk	46:31.93	Graciela Mendoza	Mexico	1995 Games	
80 metres hurdles	10.83	Cherrie Sherrard	United States	1967 Winnipeg	
Pentathlon	4860 pts	Pat Winslow	United States	1967 Winnipeg	
