= Manuel Cuesta =

Manuel Cuesta may refer to:

- Manuel Cuesta Gallardo (1873–1920), Mexican engineer and landowner, governor of Jalisco in 1911
- Manuel Cuesta Morúa (born 1962), Cuban historian and political activist
- Manuel Cuesta, Colombian athlete, competed in the 2023 South American Championships in Athletics
