= Ineh Oritsemeyiwa =

Nigerian athlete

Personal information
- Nationality: Nigerian
- Born: Ineh Emmanuel Oritsemeyiwa; 17 March 2001 (age 25)

Sport
- Sport: Track and field
- Event(s): Long jump, triple jump

Ineh Emmanuel Oritsemeyiwa (born 17 March 2001) is a Nigerian athlete who competes at long jump and triple jump.

He competed for Nigeria at local and international track and field competitions.

== Achievements ==
Oritsemeyiwa represented Nigeria at the 2018 Summer Youth Olympics Games in Buenos Aires, Argentina where he won the silver medal with 16.22 mark in the men's triple jump event behind Cuba's Jordan Diaz who won the first position.

He is also a one time top 8 finalist in the Africa Senior Championship in Athletics. He finished 7th overall best in the competition in Asaba, Delta State.

He competed at the Africa Region 11 games in Ghana where he also won gold medals in triple jump and silver medal in long jump.

One of the highlights of his career was sponsorship from Sunday Dare, Nigerias Minister of Sport to further his education in the United States as a result of his performance for Nigeria.
