= Germán Chiaraviglio =

Argentine pole vaulter (born 1987)

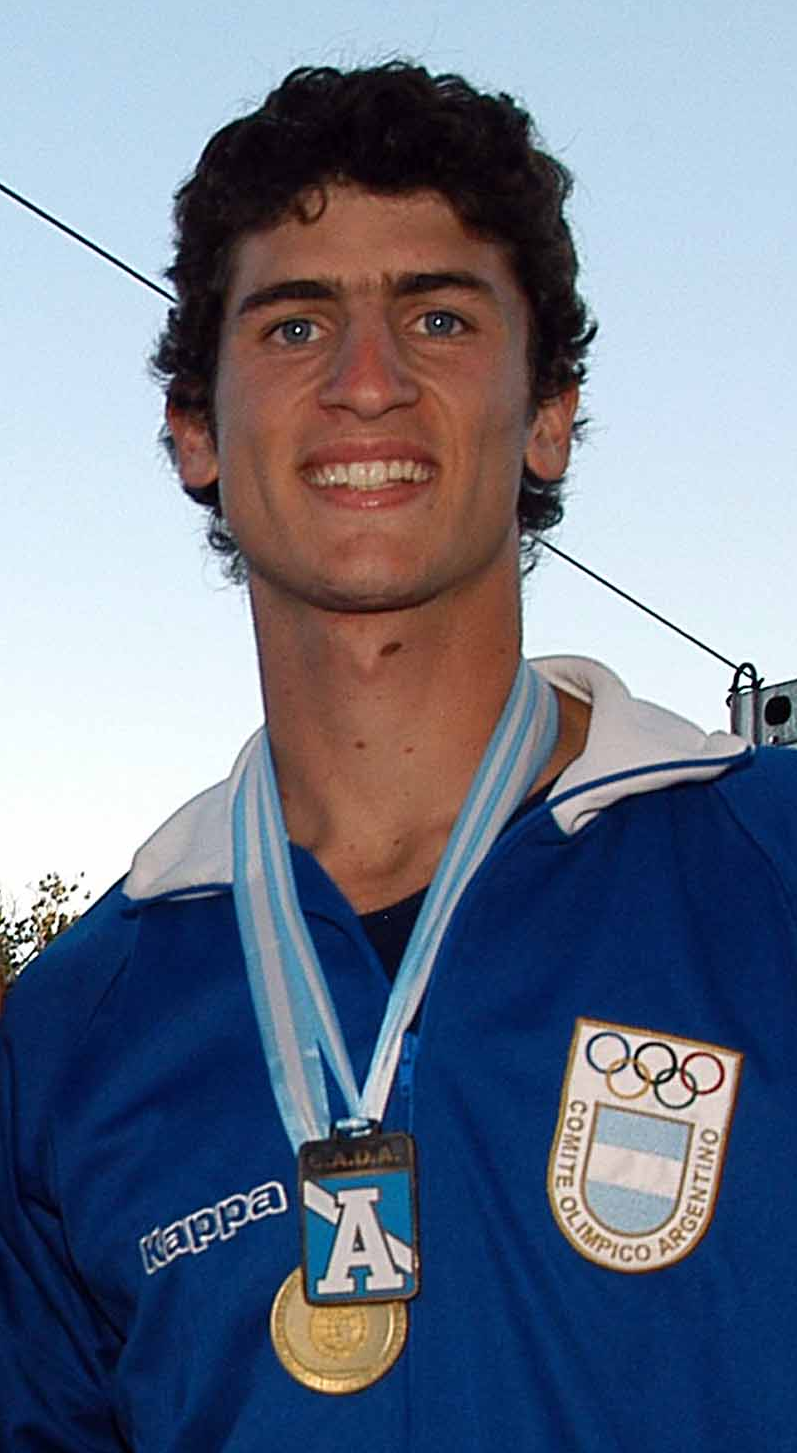
- Chiaraviglio in 2006

Personal information
- Full name: Germán Pablo Chiaraviglio Ermácora
- Nationality: Argentina
- Born: 16 April 1987 (age 39) Santa Fe, Argentina
- Height: 1.95 m (6 ft 5 in)
- Weight: 83 kg (183 lb)

Sport
- Sport: Athletics – Pole vault
Medal record
Men's Athletics
Representing Argentina
World Youth Championships
Gold medal – first place	2003 Sherbrooke	Pole vault
Pan American Games
Silver medal – second place	2015 Toronto	Pole vault
Silver medal – second place	2023 Santiago	Pole vault
Bronze medal – third place	2007 Rio de Janeiro	Pole vault
South American Youth Championships
Gold medal – first place	2002 Asunción	Pole vault
Gold medal – first place	2004 Guayaquil	Pole vault
- Updated on March 2026

Germán Pablo Chiaraviglio Ermácora (born 16 April 1987) is an Argentine pole vaulter.

== Biography ==
His personal best of 5.71 metres was achieved at the World Junior Championships in Beijing on August 19, 2006, when he beat the old championship record (CR) of István Bagyula from 1988, and the Argentine senior record. He also holds the South American indoors record, with 5.52 metres, and is the only Argentine athlete to conquer a gold medal in any World Championship at any category.

Germán was first coached by his father within a family of pole vaulters; his brother Guillermo Jr. (in 2001) and sister Valeria (in 2005) also participated in World Junior Championships. During the 2006 South American Games, he won the gold medal (5.65 m) and his brother Guillermo silver (5.20 m). He currently trains in Italy with pole vaulting star Yelena Isinbayeva, co-coached by Vitaly Petrov.

In 2010 Germán won the Platinum Konex Award from Argentina as the best Athlete from the last decade in his country.

In 2015, he finally broke his own national record (after 9 years), jumping 5.75 at the Pan-American Games.

== Personal best ==
Event	Result	Venue	Date
Pole vault	5.75 m	Toronto, Canada	21 July 2015

== Achievements ==
Year	Competition	Venue	Position	Event	Notes
Representing Argentina
2002	South American Youth Championships	Asunción, Paraguay	1st	Pole vault	4.75 m
2003	South American Junior Championships	Guayaquil, Ecuador	1st	Pole vault	5.16 m
2003	World Youth Championships	Sherbrooke, Canada	1st	Pole vault	5.15 m
2003	Pan American Junior Championships	Bridgetown, Barbados	1st	Pole vault	5.15 m
2004	Ibero-American Championships	Huelva, Spain	3rd	Pole vault	5.30 m
2004	World Junior Championships	Grosseto, Italy	2nd	Pole vault	5.45 m
2004	South American Youth Championships	Guayaquil, Ecuador	1st	Pole vault	5.20 m
2004	South American Youth Championships	Guayaquil, Ecuador	4th	4 × 100 m relay	43.22 s
2005	South American Championships	Cali, Colombia	3rd	Pole vault	5.10 m
2005	Pan American Junior Championships	Windsor, Canada	1st	Pole vault	5.40 m
2006	Ibero-American Championships	Ponce, Puerto Rico	1st	Pole vault	5.70 m
2006	World Junior Championships	Beijing, China	1st	Pole vault	5.71 m (PB, CR)
2006	World Cup	Athens, Greece	3rd	Pole vault	5.70 m
2006	South American Championships	Tunja, Colombia	1st	Pole vault	5.40 m
2006	South American U23 Championships / South American Games	Buenos Aires, Argentina	1st	Pole vault	5.65 m
2007	South American Championships	São Paulo, Brazil	2nd	Pole vault	5.40 m
2007	Pan American Games	Rio de Janeiro, Brazil	3rd	Pole vault	5.20 m
2007	World Championships	Osaka, Japan	18th (q)	Pole vault	5.55 m
2008	Olympic Games	Beijing, China	–	Pole vault	NM
2008	South American U23 Championships	Lima, Peru	1st	Pole vault	5.10 m
2011	South American Championships	Buenos Aires, Argentina	2nd	Pole vault	5.30 m
2011	Pan American Games	Guadalajara, Mexico	4th	Pole vault	5.50 m
2012	Ibero-American Championships	Barquisimeto, Venezuela	1st	Pole vault	5.40 m
2013	South American Championships	Cartagena, Colombia	2nd	Pole vault	5.40 m
2014	South American Games	Santiago, Chile	2nd	Pole vault	5.35 m
2014	Ibero-American Championships	São Paulo, Brazil	1st	Pole vault	5.20 m
2014	Pan American Sports Festival	Mexico City, Mexico	1st	Pole vault	5.20m A
2015	South American Championships	Lima, Peru	1st	Pole vault	5.70 m
2015	Pan American Games	Toronto, Canada	2nd	Pole vault	5.75 m
2015	World Championships	Beijing, China	9th	Pole vault	5.65 m
2016	Ibero-American Championships	Rio de Janeiro, Brazil	1st	Pole vault	5.60 m
2016	Olympic Games	Rio de Janeiro, Brazil	11th	Pole vault	5.50 m
2017	South American Championships	Asunción, Paraguay	1st	Pole vault	5.60 m
2017	World Championships	London, United Kingdom	26th (q)	Pole vault	5.45 m
2018	South American Games	Cochabamba, Bolivia	2nd	Pole vault	5.40 m
2018	Ibero-American Championships	Trujillo, Peru	2nd	Pole vault	5.20 m
2019	South American Championships	Lima, Peru	3rd	Pole vault	5.21 m
2019	Pan American Games	Lima, Peru	5th	Pole vault	5.51 m
2020	South American Indoor Championships	Cochabamba, Bolivia	1st	Pole vault	5.50 m
2021	South American Championships	Guayaquil, Ecuador	1st	Pole vault	5.55 m
2022	South American Indoor Championships	Cochabamba, Bolivia	–	Pole vault	NM
2022	Ibero-American Championships	La Nucía, Spain	3rd	Pole vault	5.30 m
2022	World Championships	Eugene, United States	28th (q)	Pole vault	5.30 m
2022	South American Games	Asunción, Paraguay	1st	Pole vault	5.45 m
2023	South American Championships	São Paulo, Brazil	1st	Pole vault	5.55 m
2023	World Championships	Budapest, Hungary	22nd (q)	Pole vault	5.35 m
2023	Pan American Games	Santiago, Chile	2nd	Pole vault	5.50 m

Awards
Preceded by (Argentina) David Nalbandian	Olimpia de Oro; 2006	Succeeded by (Argentina) Ángel Cabrera
