= Fábio Gomes (pole vaulter) =

Brazilian pole vaulter

Fábio Gomes da Silva
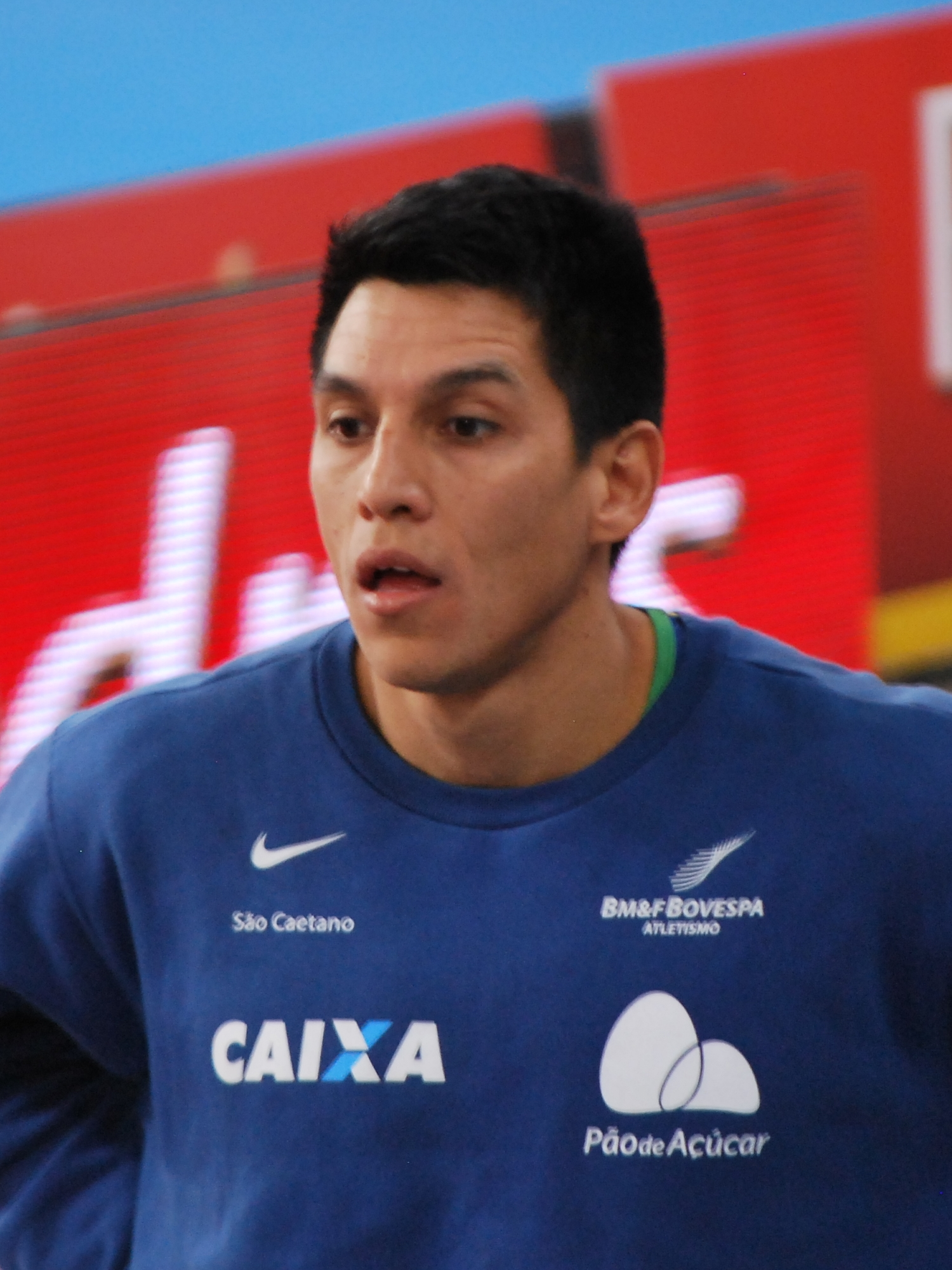

Personal information
- Born: August 4, 1983 (age 42) Campinas, São Paulo
- Height: 1.78 m (5 ft 10 in)
- Weight: 70 kg (154 lb)

Sport
- Country: Brazil
- Sport: Athletics
- Event: Pole vault
Medal record
Representing Brazil
Pan American Games
Gold medal – first place	2007 Rio de Janeiro	Pole vault
Military World Games
Bronze medal – third place	2011 Rio de Janeiro	Pole vault
- Updated on 14 October 2015

Fábio Gomes da Silva (born 4 August 1983 in Campinas) is a Brazilian pole vaulter.

His personal best jump is 5.80 metres (outdoor) set in February 2011, and 5.70 metres (indoor) set in February 2013, both achieved in São Caetano do Sul, Brazil. He held the South American and Brazilian records for the event from 2011 until 2013, when both marks were beaten by Augusto de Oliveira.

== Achievements ==
Year	Competition	Venue	Position	Event	Notes
Representing Brazil
1999	South American Junior Championships	Concepción, Chile	3rd	Pole vault	4.75 m
2000	South American Junior Championships	São Leopoldo, Brazil	2nd	Pole vault	5.00 m
2000	South American Youth Championships	Bogotá, Colombia	2nd	Pole vault	4.95 m
2001	South American Championships	Manaus, Brazil	5th	Pole vault	4.80 m
2001	South American Junior Championships	Santa Fe, Argentina	3rd	Pole vault	4.80 m
2001	Pan American Junior Championships	Santa Fe, Argentina	3rd	Pole vault	5.15 m
2002	World Junior Championships	Kingston, Jamaica	12th	Pole vault	5.00 m
2002	South American Junior Championships / South American Games	Belém, Brazil	1st	Pole vault	5.10 m
2003	South American Championships	Barquisimeto, Venezuela	5th	Pole vault	5.10 m
2004	Ibero-American Championships	Huelva, Spain	1st	Pole vault	5.40 m
2005	South American Championships	Cali, Colombia	1st	Pole vault	5.40 m
2005	Universiade	İzmir, Turkey	11th	Pole vault	5.20 m
2006	Ibero-American Championships	Ponce, Puerto Rico	2nd	Pole vault	5.65 m
2006	South American Championships	Tunja, Colombia	3rd	Pole vault	5.20 m
2007	South American Championships	São Paulo, Brazil	1st	Pole vault	5.77 m (AR)
2007	Pan American Games	Rio de Janeiro, Brazil	1st	Pole vault	5.40 m
2007	World Championships	Osaka, Japan	10th	Pole vault	5.76 m
2008	World Indoor Championships	Valencia, Spain	–	Pole vault	NM
2008	Olympic Games	Beijing, China	25th (q)	Pole vault	5.45 m
2009	South American Championships	Lima, Peru	1st	Pole vault	5.40 m
2009	World Championships	Berlin, Germany	–	Pole vault	NM
2010	Ibero-American Championships	San Fernando, Spain	2nd	Pole vault	5.55 m
2011	South American Championships	Buenos Aires, Argentina	1st	Pole vault	5.35 m
2011	World Championships	Daegu, South Korea	8th	Pole vault	5.65 m
2011	Pan American Games	Guadalajara, Mexico	5th	Pole vault	5.40 m
2012	Olympic Games	London, United Kingdom	–	Pole vault	NM
2014	Ibero-American Championships	São Paulo, Brazil	–	Pole vault	NM
2015	Pan American Games	Toronto, Canada	–	Pole vault	NM
2015	World Championships	Beijing, China	33rd (q)	Pole vault	5.25 m
