= Lázaro Borges =

Cuban pole vaulter (born 1986)

Personal information
- Full name: Lázaro Eduardo Borges Reid
- Born: June 19, 1986 (age 40) Marianao, La Habana, Cuba
- Height: 1.78 m (5 ft 10 in)
- Weight: 70 kg (154 lb)

Sport
- Country: Cuba
- Sport: Athletics
- Event: Pole vault

Achievements and titles
- Personal best: 5.90m
- Updated on 25 December 2014

Lázaro Eduardo Borges Reid (born June 19, 1986) is a Cuban pole vaulter.

== Biography ==
Borges was born in Marianao, La Habana. He has represented Cuba at 2008 Summer Olympics, but failed to advance to the Final. Borges won silver medal in 2011 World Championships with 5.90m, setting new Cuban record. His personal best before the competition was 5.75m.

He improved the Cuban indoor pole vault record in 2012 and cleared 5.72 m at the Pole Vault Stars meet.

At the 2012 Summer Olympics, he was trying to qualify for the final, when his pole broke into three large pieces (and at least two small ones) during his attempt to clear 5.35 m.

== Achievements ==
Year	Competition	Venue	Position	Notes
Representing Cuba
2005	ALBA Games	La Habana, Cuba	1st	5.00 m
2005	Central American and Caribbean Championships	Nassau, Bahamas	1st	4.80 m
2006	NACAC Under-23 Championships	Santo Domingo, Dominican Republic	2nd	5.25 m
2006	Central American and Caribbean Games	Cartagena, Colombia	–	NM
2007	Pan American Games	Rio de Janeiro, Brazil	–	NM
2008	Central American and Caribbean Championships	Cali, Colombia	1st	5.50 m
2008	Olympic Games	Beijing, China	–	NM
2009	ALBA Games	La Habana, Cuba	1st	5.20 m
2010	Ibero-American Championships	San Fernando, Spain	1st	5.60 m
2011	World Championships	Daegu, South Korea	2nd	5.90 m (NR)
2011	Pan American Games	Guadalajara, Mexico	1st	5.80 m
2012	World Indoor Championships	Istanbul, Turkey	5th	5.70 m
2012	Olympic Games	London, United Kingdom	16th (q)	5.50 m
2013	World Championships	Moscow, Russia	21st (q)	5.40 m
2014	Pan American Sports Festival	Mexico City, Mexico	2nd	5.15 m A
2014	Central American and Caribbean Games	Xalapa, Mexico	1st	5.30 m A
2015	Pan American Games	Toronto, Canada	5th	5.40 m
2015	NACAC Championships	San José, Costa Rica	–	NM
2018	Central American and Caribbean Games	Barranquilla, Colombia	1st	5.30 m
2019	Pan American Games	Lima, Peru	10th	5.16 m

== Personal bests ==
Event	Best	Venue	Date
Outdoor
Pole vault	5.90 m NR	Daegu, South Korea	August 29, 2011
Indoor
Pole vault	5.72 m NR	Donetsk, Ukraine	February 11, 2012
