= Jeremy Scott (athlete) =

American pole vaulter (born 1981)

Personal information
- Full name: Jeremy R. Scott
- Born: May 1, 1981 (age 45) Norfolk, Nebraska, U.S.
- Height: 6 ft 9 in (2.07 m)
- Weight: 205 lb (93 kg)

Sport
- Country: United States
- Sport: Athletics
- Event: Pole Vault

Achievements and titles
- Highest world ranking: 7
- Personal best: 5.82m
Medal record
Pan American Games
Silver medal – second place	2011 Guadalajara	Pole vault
NACAC Championships
Bronze medal – third place	2007 San Salvador	Pole vault
NACAC Championships
Gold medal – first place	2002 San Antonio	Pole vault
- Updated on 11 August 2012

Jeremy R. Scott (born May 1, 1981) is an American pole vaulter from Norfolk, Nebraska. At over 6 ft 9 in (2.06 m), he is believed to be the tallest world class pole vaulter of all time.

Jeremy finished second at the 2012 US Olympic Trials, earning him a spot on the 2012 Olympic Team to compete in London. He was the 2009 US Indoor National Champion.

He finished sixth at the 2009 World Athletics Final. He also competed at the 2003 World Indoor Championships. On the Outdoor track he has represented the United States at the 2009 World Championships, 2011 World Championships, and the 2013 World Championships. In the 2011 season, Scott finished 7th in the Pole Vault final and also finished the season ranked 7th in the world.

He has a personal best of 5.82 meters, originally achieved in June 2009 in Jonesboro.

Scott was inducted to the NCAA track and Field Hall of Fame in 2017.

Scott graduated with honors from Allegheny College in 2003 with a degree in neuroscience, and enrolled in a master's program in exercise science at the University of Arkansas. Following his retirement from Athletics, he earned his medical degree at New York Institute of Technology in 2021 and attended Oklahoma State University Medical Center for his training in Orthopedic Surgery.

== See also ==
- 2012 Olympics
- Olympics
- Pole Vault
