= 2022 South American Indoor Championships in Athletics =

2nd South American Indoor Championships
- Dates: 19–20 February
- Host city: Cochabamba, Bolivia
- Venue: Estadio de Atletismo del Gobierno Autónomo Municipal de Cochabamba
- Level: Senior
- Events: 26
- Participation: 117 athletes from 11 nations
- Records set: 2 AR, 16 CR

2022 South American Indoor Championships in Athletics was the second edition of the biennial indoor athletics competition between South American nations. The event was held in Cochabamba, Bolivia, on 19 and 20 February at the Estadio de Atletismo del Gobierno Autónomo Municipal de Cochabamba.

== Medal summary ==
=== Men ===
Event	Gold		Silver		Bronze	
60 metres	Felipe Bardi dos Santos (BRA)	6.62 CR	David Vivas (VEN)	6.63 NR	Franco Florio (ARG)	6.70
400 metres	Lucas Carvalho (BRA)	46.85 CR	Javier Gómez (VEN)	47.25	Pedro Luiz de Oliveira (BRA)	47.40
800 metres	Lucirio Antonio Garrido (VEN)	1:52.12 CR	Eduardo Moreira (BRA)	1:52.40	Guilherme Kurtz (BRA)	1:52.71
1500 metres	David Ninavia (BOL)	3:56.16 CR	José Daniel González (VEN)	3:57.13	Guilherme Kurtz (BRA)	3:57.58
3000 metres	Daniel Toroya (BOL)	8:38.29	Ederson Pereira (BRA)	8:40.96	José Daniel González (VEN)	8:49.80
60 metres hurdles	Rafael Pereira (BRA)	7.58 =AR	Gabriel Constantino (BRA)	7.72	Agustín Carrera (ARG)	7.85
4 × 400 metres relay	Venezuela; Leodan Torrealba; Lucirio Antonio Garrido; Ryan López; Javier Gómez	3:16.91 CR	Bolivia; Tito Hinojosa; Juan Manuel Gareca; Alberto Antelo; Nery Peñaloza	3:17.87 NR	Only two starting teams	
High jump	Thiago Moura (BRA)	2.22 m	Carlos Layoy (ARG)	2.16 m	José André Camacho (BOL)	1.90 m
Pole vault	Augusto Dutra de Oliveira (BRA)	5.50 m =CR	Abel Curtinove (BRA)	5.05 m	Only two finishers	
Long jump	José Luis Mandros (PER)	8.17 m CR NR	Emiliano Lasa (URU)	8.10 m NR	Samory Fraga (BRA)	7.82 m
Triple jump	Alexsandro Melo (BRA)	16.62 m	Almir dos Santos (BRA)	16.59 m	Leodan Torrealba (VEN)	16.55 m
Shot put	Darlan Romani (BRA)	21.71 m WL, AR	Willian Dourado (BRA)	19.83 m	Ignacio Carballo (ARG)	19.04 m
Heptathlon	Felipe Vinícius dos Santos (BRA)	5799 pts CR	Georni Jaramillo (VEN)	5552 pts	José Fernando Ferreira (BRA)	5489 pts
WR world record | AR area record | CR championship record | GR games record | NR national record | OR Olympic record | PB personal best | SB season best | WL world leading (in a given season)

=== Women ===
Event	Gold		Silver		Bronze	
60 metres	Rosângela Santos (BRA)	7.24 CR	Vitória Cristina Rosa (BRA)	7.25	Macarena Borie (CHI)	7.43
400 metres	Tábata de Carvalho (BRA)	54.81	Liliane Parrela (BRA)	55.37	Noelia Martínez (ARG)	55.88
800 metres	Déborah Rodríguez (URU)	2:18.23	Jaqueline Weber (BRA)	2:18.58	Martina Escudero (ARG)	2:19.33
1500 metres	Jhoselyn Camargo (BOL)	4:39.33	Tatiana Poma (BOL)	4:46.49	Jaqueline Weber (BRA)	4:49.42
3000 metres	Lizeth Veizaga (BOL)	10:47.84	Eva Fernández (BOL)	11:09.00	Elisângela de Oliveira (BRA)	11:40.68
60 metres hurdles	Ketiley Batista (BRA)	8.41	Diana Bazalar (PER)	8.48	Valentina Polanco (ARG)	8.62
4 × 400 metres relay	Bolivia; Lucía Sotomayor; Mariana Arce; Tania Guasace; Cecilia Gómez	3:47.37 CR AR	Argentina; Martina Escudero; Valentina Polanco; María Florencia Lamboglia; Noelia Martínez	3:59.15	Only two starting teams	
High jump	Sarah Freitas (BRA)	1.79 m	Arielly Rodrigues (BRA)	1.73 m	Carla Ríos (BOL)	1.70 m
Pole vault	Isabel de Quadros (BRA)	4.10 m CR	Alejandra Arevalo (PER)	4.00 m	Juliana Campos (BRA)	3.90 m
Long jump	Nathalee Aranda (PAN)	6.43 m	Rocío Muñoz (CHI)	6.29 m NR	Eliane Martins (BRA)	6.23 m
Triple jump	Gabriele dos Santos (BRA)	13.89 m CR	Liuba Zaldívar (ECU)	13.66 m	Silvana Segura (PER)	13.31 m
Shot put	Livia Avancini (BRA)	17.52 m CR	Ivana Gallardo (CHI)	17.03 m	Milena Sens (BRA)	16.59 m
Pentathlon	Raiane Procópio (BRA)	3921 pts CR	Camila Jiménez (BOL)	3202 pts	Only two participants	
WR world record | AR area record | CR championship record | GR games record | NR national record | OR Olympic record | PB personal best | SB season best | WL world leading (in a given season)

== Medal table ==
The host country is highlighted in lavender blue

Rank	Nation	Gold	Silver	Bronze	Total
1	Brazil	16	10	10	36
2	Bolivia*	5	4	2	11
3	Venezuela	2	4	2	8
4	Peru	1	2	1	4
5	Uruguay	1	1	0	2
6	Panama	1	0	0	1
7	Argentina	0	2	6	8
8	Chile	0	2	1	3
9	Ecuador	0	1	0	1
10	Colombia	0	0	0	0
10	Paraguay	0	0	0	0
Totals (11 entries)		26	26	22	74

== Participation ==
Eleven member federations participated in the championships.

- Argentina (11)
- Bolivia (33)
- Brazil (44)
- Chile (5)
- Colombia (2)
- Ecuador (1)
- Paraguay (2)
- Peru (7)
- Puerto Rico (2)
- Uruguay (3)
- Venezuela (7)

== See also ==
- 2021 South American Championships in Athletics
- Athletics at the 2020 Summer Olympics
- 2021 South American Under-23 Championships in Athletics
- 2022 World Athletics Indoor Championships
- 2022 World Athletics Championships
- 2022 Ibero-American Championships in Athletics
- Athletics at the 2022 South American Games
