= 2007 South American Championships in Athletics – Results =

These are the results of the 2007 South American Championships in Athletics which took place from June 7 through June 9, 2007 in São Paulo, Brazil. The list was compiled from various sources and is still incomplete, especially concerning details of the field events.

== Men's results ==
=== 100 meters ===
Heat 1 – 8 June – Wind: -0.8 m/s

Rank	Name	Nationality	Reaction time	Time	Notes
1	Vicente de Lima	Brazil	0.153	10.44	Q
2	Gustavo Montalvo	Venezuela	0.188	10.62	Q
3	Cristián Reyes	Chile	0.169	10.63	Q
4	Harlin Echevarría	Colombia	0.178	10.70	q
5	Luis Morán	Ecuador	0.227	10.75	q
6	Nicolás Moreira	Paraguay	0.184	10.81	PB
7	Jurgen Themen	Suriname	0.179	11.05	

Heat 2 – 8 June – Wind: -0.8 m/s

Rank	Name	Nationality	Reaction time	Time	Notes
1	Franklin Nazareno	Ecuador	0.178	10.49	Q
2	Álvaro Gómez	Colombia	0.154	10.60	Q
3	José Carlos Moreira	Brazil	0.174	10.67	Q
4	Jeremy Bascom	Guyana	0.185	10.85	SB
5	Ronald Amaya	Venezuela	0.187	10.85	
6	Ignácio Rojas	Chile	0.150	10.86	
7	Edgar Galeano	Paraguay	0.142	11.12	

Final – 8 June – Wind: -0.7 m/s

Rank	Name	Nationality	Reaction time	Time	Notes
1st place, gold medalist(s)	Vicente de Lima	Brazil	0.142	10.36	
2nd place, silver medalist(s)	Franklin Nazareno	Ecuador	0.177	10.37	
3rd place, bronze medalist(s)	Álvaro Gómez	Colombia	0.175	10.66	
4	José Carlos Moreira	Brazil	0.171	10.67	
5	Gustavo Montalvo	Venezuela	0.177	10.71	
6	Harlin Echevarría	Colombia	0.158	10.75	
7	Luis Morán	Ecuador	0.203	10.76	
	Cristián Reyes	Chile		DNF	

=== 200 meters ===
Heat 1 – 9 June – Wind: +1.3 m/s

Rank	Name	Nationality	Reaction time	Time	Notes
1	Sandro Viana	Brazil	0.194	20.94	Q
2	Heber Viera	Uruguay	0.271	21.03	Q
3	Iván Carlos Altamirano	Argentina	0.177	21.42	q
4	Jeremy Bascom	Guyana	0.192	21.92	SB
6	Gustavo Montalvo	Venezuela	0.277	22.41	

Heat 2 – 9 June – Wind: +0.8 m/s

Rank	Name	Nationality	Reaction time	Time	Notes
1	Basílio de Morães	Brazil	0.186	21.37	Q
2	Franklin Nazareno	Ecuador	0.211	21.45	Q
3	Yeimer Mosquera	Colombia	0.360	21.47	q
4	Sebastián Keitel	Chile	0.200	21.70	SB

Heat 3 – 9 June – Wind: +0.7 m/s

Rank	Name	Nationality	Reaction time	Time	Notes
1	Daniel Grueso	Colombia	0.202	21.09	Q
2	Mariano Jiménez	Argentina	0.184	21.55	Q
3	Ronald Amaya	Venezuela	0.244	21.63	SB
4	Ignácio Rojas	Chile	0.189	22.07	
5	Jurgen Themen	Suriname	0.272	22.29	SB

Final – 9 June – Wind: +0.4 m/s

Rank	Name	Nationality	Reaction time	Time	Notes
1st place, gold medalist(s)	Sandro Viana	Brazil	0.150	20.54	
2nd place, silver medalist(s)	Heber Viera	Uruguay	0.540	20.59	SB
3rd place, bronze medalist(s)	Daniel Grueso	Colombia	0.225	20.66	NR
4	Basílio de Morães	Brazil	0.169	20.72	
5	Franklin Nazareno	Ecuador	0.158	20.73	
6	Yeimer Mosquera	Colombia	0.226	21.14	SB
7	Iván Carlos Altamirano	Argentina	0.159	21.58	
	Mariano Jiménez	Argentina		?	

=== 400 meters ===
Heat 1 – 7 June

Rank	Name	Nationality	Reaction time	Time	Notes
1	Rodrigo Bargas	Brazil	0.270	47.01	Q
2	Yeimer Mosquera	Colombia	0.410	47.40	Q
3	Angelo Edmund	Panama	0.250	47.45	Q
4	Esteban Brandán	Argentina	0.603	48.36	q

Heat 2 – 7 June

Rank	Name	Nationality	Reaction time	Time	Notes
1	Fernando de Almeida	Brazil	0.259	46.45	Q
2	Andrés Silva	Uruguay	0.272	46.62	Q
3	Josner Rodríguez	Venezuela	0.201	46.97	Q
4	Javier Mosquera	Colombia	0.188	47.23	q, SB
5	Pablo Navarrete	Chile	0.213	48.43	

Final – 8 June

Rank	Name	Nationality	Reaction time	Time	Notes
1st place, gold medalist(s)	Andrés Silva	Uruguay	0.273	45.89	SB
2nd place, silver medalist(s)	Rodrigo Bargas	Brazil	0.241	46.15	
3rd place, bronze medalist(s)	Fernando de Almeida	Brazil	0.218	46.38	
4	Angelo Edmund	Panama	0.376	46.46	PB
5	Yeimer Mosquera	Colombia	0.243	46.49	SB
6	Josner Rodríguez	Venezuela	0.217	46.84	
7	Javier Mosquera	Colombia	0.182	47.50	
8	Esteban Brandán	Argentina	0.270	48.19	

=== 800 meters ===
Final – 8 June

Rank	Name	Nationality	Time	Notes
1st place, gold medalist(s)	Kléberson Davide	Brazil	1:49.61	
2nd place, silver medalist(s)	Gustavo Aguirre	Argentina	1:49.98	
3rd place, bronze medalist(s)	André de Santana	Brazil	1:50.10	
4	Simoncito Silvera	Venezuela	1:50.18	
5	Pablo Navarrete	Chile	1:51.81	
6	Freddy Espinoza	Colombia	1:52.25	
7	Leonardo Price	Argentina	1:55.11	

=== 1500 meters ===
Final – 9 June

Rank	Name	Nationality	Time	Notes
1st place, gold medalist(s)	Byron Piedra	Ecuador	3:42.53	
2nd place, silver medalist(s)	Leandro Oliveira	Brazil	3:43.26	
3rd place, bronze medalist(s)	Eduard Villanueva	Venezuela	3:43.40	
4	Nico Herrera	Venezuela	3:44.38	
5	Javier Carriqueo	Argentina	3:44.79	
6	Fadrique Iglesias	Bolivia	3:45.57	NR
7	Fabiano Peçanha	Brazil	3:50.55	
8	Leslie Encina	Chile	3:50.67	
9	Freddy Espinoza	Colombia	3:50.96	
10	Leonardo Price	Argentina	3:58.03	

=== 5000 meters ===
Final – 7 June

Rank	Name	Nationality	Time	Notes
1st place, gold medalist(s)	Javier Guarín	Colombia	13:51.19	CR, SB
2nd place, silver medalist(s)	Javier Carriqueo	Argentina	13:55.37	
3rd place, bronze medalist(s)	William Naranjo	Colombia	13:56.99	
4	Ubiratán José dos Santos	Brazil	14:03.51	
5	Byron Piedra	Ecuador	14:15.48	SB
6	Luiz Carlos da Silva	Brazil	14:37.02	
7	Juan Diego Contreras	Peru	14:38.40	PB
8	Didimo Sánchez	Venezuela	15:08.94	

=== 10,000 meters ===
Final – 8 June

Rank	Name	Nationality	Time	Notes
1st place, gold medalist(s)	Sérgio Celestino da Silva	Brazil	29:57.80	
2nd place, silver medalist(s)	Ubiratán José dos Santos	Brazil	30:12.36	
3rd place, bronze medalist(s)	Didimo Sánchez	Venezuela	31:15.30	

=== 3000 meters steeplechase ===
Final – 9 June

Rank	Name	Nationality	Time	Notes
1st place, gold medalist(s)	Sergio Lobos	Chile	8:37.83	PB
2nd place, silver medalist(s)	Gladson Barbosa	Brazil	8:43.69	
3rd place, bronze medalist(s)	José Gregorio Peña	Venezuela	8:54.43	
4	Santiago Figueroa	Argentina	8:56.12	
5	Celso Ficagna	Brazil	9:06.09	
6	Mariano Mastromarino	Argentina	9:10.72	
	Mario Bazán	Peru	DNF	

=== 110 meters hurdles ===
Heat 1 – 7 June – Wind: +0.2 m/s

Rank	Name	Nationality	Reaction time	Time	Notes
1	Anselmo Gomes da Silva	Brazil	0.197	13.68	Q
2	Leandro Peyrano	Argentina	0.280	14.46	Q, SB
3	Francisco Castro	Chile	0.220	14.76	Q

Heat 2 – 7 June – Wind: +0.3 m/s

Rank	Name	Nationality	Reaction time	Time	Notes
1	Éder Antônio Souza	Brazil	0.201	14.27	Q
2	Jorge McFarlane	Peru	0.358	14.32	Q
3	Jhon Tamayo	Ecuador	0.285	14.84	Q

Final – 7 June – Wind: -0.8 m/s

Rank	Name	Nationality	Reaction time	Time	Notes
1st place, gold medalist(s)	Anselmo Gomes da Silva	Brazil	0.158	13.56	
2nd place, silver medalist(s)	Éder Antônio Souza	Brazil	0.207	13.58	PB
3rd place, bronze medalist(s)	Francisco Castro	Chile	0.179	14.31	
4	Jorge McFarlane	Peru	0.285	14.45	
5	Leandro Peyrano	Argentina	0.224	14.46	=SB
6	Jhon Tamayo	Ecuador	0.257	14.72	

=== 400 meters hurdles ===
Heat 1 – 8 June

Rank	Name	Nationality	Reaction time	Time	Notes
1	Raphael Fernandes	Brazil	0.288	50.62	Q
2	Christian Deymonnaz	Argentina	0.190	52.27	Q
3	Pablo Maturana	Colombia	0.170	52.41	Q
4	Jhon Tamayo	Ecuador	0.302	53.96	q

Heat 1 – 8 June

Rank	Name	Nationality	Reaction time	Time	Notes
1	Maurício Teixeira	Brazil	0.294	51.05	Q
2	José Céspedes	Venezuela	0.315	51.24	Q
3	Luis Montenegro	Chile	0.210	51.65	Q
4	José Ignacio Pignataro	Argentina	0.237	53.49	q

Final – 9 June

Rank	Name	Nationality	Reaction time	Time	Notes
1st place, gold medalist(s)	Raphael Fernandes	Brazil	0.148	49.81	
2nd place, silver medalist(s)	Maurício Teixeira	Brazil	0.310	50.39	=SB
3rd place, bronze medalist(s)	José Céspedes	Venezuela	0.378	50.62	
4	Pablo Maturana	Colombia	0.209	51.05	SB
5	Luis Montenegro	Chile	0.243	51.45	
6	Christian Deymonnaz	Argentina	0.199	52.08	SB
7	José Ignacio Pignataro	Argentina	0.353	52.12	
8	Jhon Tamayo	Ecuador	0.287	53.87	

=== High jump ===
Final – 8 June

Rank	Name	Nationality	Result	Notes
1st place, gold medalist(s)	Jessé de Lima	Brazil	2.24	=SB
2nd place, silver medalist(s)	Fábio Baptista	Brazil	2.21	
3rd place, bronze medalist(s)	Gilmar Mayo	Colombia	2.21	SB
4	Diego Ferrín	Ecuador	2.10	SB
5	Santiago Guerci	Argentina	2.05	
6	Francisco Castro	Chile	2.00	SB

=== Pole vault ===
Final – 7 June

Rank	Name	Nationality	Result	Notes
1st place, gold medalist(s)	Fábio da Silva	Brazil	5.77	AR, CR, NR
2nd place, silver medalist(s)	Germán Chiaraviglio	Argentina	5.40	
3rd place, bronze medalist(s)	Javier Benítez	Argentina	5.20	
3rd place, bronze medalist(s)	João Gabriel Sousa	Brazil	5.20	
5	José Francisco Nava	Chile	5.10	=SB

=== Long jump ===
Final – 7 June

Rank	Name	Nationality	Result	Notes
1st place, gold medalist(s)	Rogério Bispo	Brazil	7.94 (wind: +1.4 m/s)	
2nd place, silver medalist(s)	Hugo Chila	Ecuador	7.81 (wind: +0.8 m/s)	
3rd place, bronze medalist(s)	Rodrigo de Araújo	Brazil	7.77 (wind: +1.2 m/s)	
4	Louis Tristán	Peru	7.53 (wind: +1.0 m/s)	
5	Diego Ripanti	Argentina	7.37 (wind: -0.1 m/s)	
6	Jorge McFarlane	Peru	7.37 (wind: +0.5 m/s)	
7	Esteban Copland	Venezuela	7.25 (wind: +0.8 m/s)	
8	Daniel Pineda	Chile	7.11 (wind: +0.5 m/s)	
9	Jhon Murillo	Colombia	7.01 (wind: -0.1 m/s)	

=== Triple jump ===
Final – 9 June

Rank	Name	Nationality	Result	Notes
1st place, gold medalist(s)	Jefferson Sabino	Brazil	16.68 (wind: -0.3 m/s)	
2nd place, silver medalist(s)	Hugo Chila	Ecuador	16.37 (wind: +0.1 m/s)	
3rd place, bronze medalist(s)	Leonardo dos Santos	Brazil	15.89 (wind: -1.1 m/s)	
4	Jhon Murillo	Colombia	15.52 (wind: -0.6 m/s)	
5	Marcelo Pichipil	Argentina	14.97 (wind: +0.3 m/s)	
6	José Francisco Nava	Chile	14.82 (wind: -0.4 m/s)	PB

=== Shot put ===
Final – 7 June

Rank	Name	Nationality	Result	Notes
1st place, gold medalist(s)	Germán Lauro	Argentina	19.65	
2nd place, silver medalist(s)	Marco Verni	Chile	19.22	
3rd place, bronze medalist(s)	Yojer Medina	Venezuela	18.44	
4	Giovanny García	Colombia	18.27	SB
5	Ronald Julião	Brazil	17.81	SB
6	Gustavo de Mendonça	Brazil	17.27	
7	Leandro Cheppi	Argentina	16.36	

=== Discus throw ===
Final – 8 June

Rank	Name	Nationality	Result	Notes
1st place, gold medalist(s)	Germán Lauro	Argentina	57.12	
2nd place, silver medalist(s)	Ronald Julião	Brazil	56.53	
3rd place, bronze medalist(s)	Julián Angulo	Colombia	54.68	SB
4	Jesús Parejo	Venezuela	53.30	
5	Alessandro Rosa	Brazil	51.70	
6	Max Alonso	Chile	50.51	
7	Giovanny García	Colombia	48.65	

=== Hammer throw ===
Final – 8 June

Rank	Name	Nationality	Result	Notes
1st place, gold medalist(s)	Juan Ignacio Cerra	Argentina	72.96	
2nd place, silver medalist(s)	Patricio Palma	Chile	66.56	
3rd place, bronze medalist(s)	Wagner Domingos	Brazil	65.15	
4	Leonardo Pino	Chile	65.03	
5	Aldo Bello	Venezuela	64.68	
6	Adrián Marzo	Argentina	63.57	
7	Eduardo Acuña	Peru	62.30	SB
8	Marcos dos Santos	Brazil	61.83	

=== Javelin throw ===
Final – 7 June

Rank	Name	Nationality	Result	Notes
1st place, gold medalist(s)	Pablo Pietrobelli	Argentina	76.52	NR
2nd place, silver medalist(s)	Víctor Fatecha	Paraguay	75.95	
3rd place, bronze medalist(s)	Júlio César de Oliveira	Brazil	74.56	
4	Arley Ibargüen	Colombia	72.11	
5	Diego Moraga	Chile	71.51	
6	Manuel Fuenmayor	Venezuela	71.28	
7	Alexon Maximiano	Brazil	71.14	

=== Decathlon ===
7/8 June

The highest mark recorded in each event is highlighted in yellow

Rank	Athlete	Nationality	100m	LJ	SP	HJ	400m	110m H	DT	PV	JT	1500m	Points	Notes
1st place, gold medalist(s)	Gonzalo Barroilhet	Chile	11.42/0.0	7.15/-0.3	12.59	1.93	51.93	14.00/0.0	40.14	5.30	52.81	5:05.17	7504	NR
2nd place, silver medalist(s)	Danilo Xavier	Brazil	11.23/0.0	7.22/0.5	11.99	1.87	49.47	14.50/0.0	37.40	4.20	54.64	4:43.93	7288	SB
3rd place, bronze medalist(s)	Sinval de Oliveira	Brazil	11.21/0.0	7.11/0.1	11.73	1.84	48.40	15.10/0.0	35.97	4.10	52.08	4:22.90	7243	PB
4	Gerardo Canale	Argentina	11.69/0.0	6.92/0.2	12.31	2.05	51.60	15.10/0.0	36.95	4.50	51.97	4:57.75	7088	
5	Andrés Horacio Mantilla	Colombia	11.54/0.0	6.37/-0.2	13.49	1.93	51.98	14.90/0.0	44.91	4.10	54.37	5:06.70	6994	SB
	Oscar Mina	Ecuador	10.96/0.0	6.75/+0.3	12.37	1.99	50.26	16.30/0.0	39.15	NH	43.56	DNS	DNF	

=== 20,000 meters walk ===
Final – 8 June

Rank	Name	Nationality	Time	Notes
1st place, gold medalist(s)	James Rendón	Colombia	1:24:25.37	SB
2nd place, silver medalist(s)	Rolando Saquipay	Ecuador	1:25:55.20	SB
3rd place, bronze medalist(s)	Juan Manuel Cano	Argentina	1:28:28.47	SB
4	Ronald Huayta	Bolivia	1:40:15.45	SB
	José Alessandro Bagio	Brazil	DNF	
	Mário dos Santos	Brazil	DQ	

=== 4 x 100 meters relay ===
Final – 8 June

Rank	Nation	Competitors	Reaction time	Time	Notes
1st place, gold medalist(s)	Brazil	Sandro Viana; Vicente de Lima; Basílio de Morães; Nilson André	0.173	38.77	
2nd place, silver medalist(s)	Colombia	Harlin Echevarría; Yeimer Mosquera; Álvaro Gómez; Daniel Grueso	0.170	39.80	
3rd place, bronze medalist(s)	Argentina	José Manuel Garaventa; Miguel Wilken; Iván Carlos Altamirano; Mariano Jiménez	0.292	39.91	NR
4	Ecuador	Luis Morán; Hugo Chila; Franklin Nazareno; Oscar Mina	0.180	40.05	NR
5	Panama	Alonso Edward; Andrés Rodríguez; Angelo Edmund; Jonathan Gibson	0.244	40.13	
6	Venezuela	Gustavo Montalvo; Ronald Amaya; Wilmer Rivas; Ellis Ollarves	0.202	40.27	
7	Chile	Ignácio Rojas; Sebastián Keitel; Daniel Pineda; José Francisco Nava	0.226	40.82	

=== 4 x 400 meters relay ===
Final – 9 June

Rank	Nation	Competitors	Reaction time	Time	Notes
1st place, gold medalist(s)	Brazil	Fernando de Almeida; Rodrigo Bargas; Eduardo Vasconcelos; Raphael Fernandes	0.243	3:04.36	
2nd place, silver medalist(s)	Venezuela	Wilmer Rivas; Simoncito Silvera; José Céspedes; Josner Rodríguez	0.193	3:05.88	
3rd place, bronze medalist(s)	Panama	Alonso Edward; Andrés Rodríguez; Angelo Edmund; Jonathan Gibson	0.210	3:09.67	NR
4	Colombia	Yeimer Mosquera; Pablo Maturana; Freddy Espinoza; Javier Mosquera	0.358	3:11.57	
5	Argentina	Gustavo Aguirre; Miguel Wilken; Esteban Brandán; Christian Deymonnaz	0.575	3:12.89	
6	Chile	Pablo Navarrete; Luis Montenegro; Daniel Pineda; Ignácio Rojas	0.601	3:15.17	
7	Ecuador	Jhonatan Loor; Diego Ferrín; José Luis Vargas; Jhon Tamayo	0.539	3:16.91	

== Women's results ==
=== 100 meters ===
Heat 1 – 7 June – Wind: -0.2 m/s

Rank	Name	Nationality	Reaction time	Time	Notes
1	Lucimar de Moura	Brazil	0.147	11.32	Q
2	Mirtha Brock	Colombia	0.202	11.77	Q
3	Suhail Garcia	Venezuela	0.534	11.87	Q
4	Carolina Díaz	Chile	0.172	11.95	q
5	Kristen Nieuwendam	Suriname	0.210	12.33	q

Heat 2 – 7 June – Wind: +0.3 m/s

Rank	Name	Nationality	Reaction time	Time	Notes
1	Felipa Palácios	Colombia	0.197	11.60	Q
2	Thaíssa Presti	Brazil	0.167	11.79	Q
3	Daniela Pávez	Chile	0.208	12.00	Q
4	Maitté Zamorano	Bolivia	0.275	12.38	

Final – 7 June – Wind: +0.2 m/s

Rank	Name	Nationality	Reaction time	Time	Notes
1st place, gold medalist(s)	Lucimar de Moura	Brazil	0.131	11.20	SB
2nd place, silver medalist(s)	Felipa Palácios	Colombia	0.178	11.43	SB
3rd place, bronze medalist(s)	Thaíssa Presti	Brazil	0.234	11.63	
4	Mirtha Brock	Colombia	0.182	11.71	
5	Suhail Garcia	Venezuela	0.490	11.79	PB
6	Carolina Díaz	Chile	0.177	11.93	SB
7	Daniela Pávez	Chile	0.195	12.01	
8	Kristen Nieuwendam	Suriname	0.216	12.23	SB

=== 200 meters ===
Heat 1 – 9 June – Wind: +1.4 m/s

Rank	Name	Nationality	Reaction time	Time	Notes
1	Felipa Palácios	Colombia	0.190	23.83	Q
2	Thaíssa Presti	Brazil	0.355	24.36	Q
3	Fernanda Mackenna	Chile	0.313	24.86	Q

Heat 2 – 9 June – Wind: +0.8 m/s

Rank	Name	Nationality	Reaction time	Time	Notes
1	Lucimar de Moura	Brazil	0.162	23.69	Q
2	Suhail Garcia	Venezuela	0.221	24.76	Q
3	Kristen Nieuwendam	Suriname	0.256	24.88	Q
4	Brigith Merlano	Colombia	0.204	24.89	q
5	Daniela Riderelli	Chile	0.527	25.00	q

Final – 9 June – Wind: -0.5 m/s

Rank	Name	Nationality	Reaction time	Time	Notes
1st place, gold medalist(s)	Lucimar de Moura	Brazil	0.153	23.00	SB
2nd place, silver medalist(s)	Felipa Palácios	Colombia	0.190	23.10	
3rd place, bronze medalist(s)	Thaíssa Presti	Brazil	0.237	23.58	
4	Suhail Garcia	Venezuela	0.479	24.36	PB
5	Brigith Merlano	Colombia	0.196	24.44	SB
6	Fernanda Mackenna	Chile	0.523	24.47	SB
7	Kristen Nieuwendam	Suriname	0.592	24.77	
8	Daniela Riderelli	Chile	0.270	24.81	SB

=== 400 meters ===
Final – 8 June

Rank	Name	Nationality	Reaction time	Time	Notes
1st place, gold medalist(s)	Josiane Tito	Brazil	0.522	52.67	
2nd place, silver medalist(s)	Sheila Ferreira	Brazil	0.234	53.19	
3rd place, bronze medalist(s)	Lucy Jaramillo	Ecuador	0.423	53.44	NR
4	Alejandra Idrovo	Colombia	0.218	53.54	
5	Fernanda Mackenna	Chile	0.206	55.43	SB
6	Keila Escobar	Colombia	0.486	56.73	

=== 800 meters ===
Final – 8 June

Rank	Name	Nationality	Time	Notes
1st place, gold medalist(s)	Marian Burnett	Guyana	2:03.57	
2nd place, silver medalist(s)	Muriel Coneo	Colombia	2:08.99	
3rd place, bronze medalist(s)	Marcela Britos	Uruguay	2:10.30	SB
4	Julieta Fraguio	Chile	2:12.25	
5	Déborah Maria Savoldi	Brazil	2:13.70	
	Rosibel García	Colombia	DNF	

=== 1500 meters ===
Final – 9 June

Rank	Name	Nationality	Time	Notes
1st place, gold medalist(s)	Rosibel García	Colombia	4:20.36	
2nd place, silver medalist(s)	Marian Burnett	Guyana	4:20.69	NR
3rd place, bronze medalist(s)	Zenaide Vieira	Brazil	4:22.08	
4	Valeria Rodríguez	Argentina	4:23.67	
5	Muriel Coneo	Colombia	4:26.14	
6	Faustina Huamaní	Peru	4:27.25	SB
7	Rosa Godoy	Argentina	4:31.78	SB
8	Sabine Heitling	Brazil	4:32.55	
9	Yeisy Álvarez	Venezuela	4:33.09	
10	Camila de Mello	Uruguay	4:37.04	
11	Silvia Paredes	Ecuador	4:41.59	
12	Marcela Britos	Uruguay	4:43.10	SB

=== 5000 meters ===
Final – 7 June

Rank	Name	Nationality	Time	Notes
1st place, gold medalist(s)	Ednalva da Silva	Brazil	16:09.96	
2nd place, silver medalist(s)	Lucélia Peres	Brazil	16:16.07	
3rd place, bronze medalist(s)	Bertha Sánchez	Colombia	16:21.17	
4	Faustina Huamaní	Peru	16:22.01	NR
5	Inés Melchor	Peru	16:23.44	SB
6	Yeisy Álvarez	Venezuela	16:57.30	
7	Norelys Lugo	Venezuela	17:15.12	
8	Lina Arias	Colombia	17:41.01	
	Valeria Rodríguez	Argentina	DNF	
	Karina Córdoba	Argentina	DNF	

=== 10,000 meters ===
Final – 9 June

Rank	Name	Nationality	Time	Notes
1st place, gold medalist(s)	Lucélia Peres	Brazil	34:11.95	
2nd place, silver medalist(s)	Inés Melchor	Peru	34:13.23	
3rd place, bronze medalist(s)	Bertha Sánchez	Colombia	34:23.89	
4	Ednalva da Silva	Brazil	34:27.51	
5	Jimena Misayauri	Peru	34:51.31	
6	Norelys Lugo	Venezuela	35:22.23	PB
7	Lina Arias	Colombia	35:28.01	
8	Roxana Preussler	Argentina	35:53.66	SB
	Karina Córdoba	Argentina	DNF	
	María-Elena Calle	Ecuador	DNF	

=== 3000 meters steeplechase ===
Final – 8 June

Rank	Name	Nationality	Time	Notes
1st place, gold medalist(s)	Zenaide Vieira	Brazil	10:07.93	CR
2nd place, silver medalist(s)	Ángela Figueroa	Colombia	10:13.88	NR
3rd place, bronze medalist(s)	Michele da Costa	Brazil	10:24.35	
4	Rosa Godoy	Argentina	10:29.48	
5	Silvia Paredes	Ecuador	10:57.49	
6	Ingrid Galloso	Chile	11:00.83	

=== 100 meters hurdles ===
Heat 1 – 7 June – Wind: +0.0 m/s

Rank	Name	Nationality	Reaction time	Time	Notes
1	Brigith Merlano	Colombia	0.251	13.46	Q
2	Soledad Donzino	Argentina	0.265	13.80	Q
3	Lucimara da Silva	Brazil	0.297	13.82	Q
4	Patrícia Riesco	Peru	0.198	14.20	q

Heat 2 – 7 June – Wind: +0.1 m/s

Rank	Name	Nationality	Reaction time	Time	Notes
1	Gilvaneide Parrela	Brazil	0.167	13.66	Q
2	Francisca Guzmán	Chile	0.174	14.11	Q
3	Maria Azzato	Argentina	0.376	14.87	Q

Final – 7 June – Wind: +0.0 m/s

Rank	Name	Nationality	Reaction time	Time	Notes
1st place, gold medalist(s)	Brigith Merlano	Colombia	13.27		
2nd place, silver medalist(s)	Gilvaneide Parrela	Brazil	13.40		
3rd place, bronze medalist(s)	Lucimara da Silva	Brazil	13.48		
4	Soledad Donzino	Argentina	13.60	SB	
5	Patrícia Riesco	Peru	14.07	SB	
6	Francisca Guzmán	Chile	14.46		
7	Maria Azzato	Argentina	14.84		
	Victoria Quiñónez	Ecuador	DNF		

=== 400 meters hurdles ===
Final – 9 June

Rank	Name	Nationality	Reaction time	Time	Notes
1st place, gold medalist(s)	Lucimar Teodoro	Brazil	0.320	57.36	
2nd place, silver medalist(s)	Luciana França	Brazil	0.450	58.38	
3rd place, bronze medalist(s)	Lucy Jaramillo	Ecuador	0.631	58.81	SB
4	Keila Escobar	Colombia	0.349	60.63	
5	Daysi Ugarte	Bolivia	0.403	61.02	NR
6	Jessica Miller	Uruguay	0.348	61.97	
7	Claudia Meneses	Peru	0.401	61.98	NR

=== High jump ===
Final – 9 June

Rank	Name	Nationality	Result	Notes
1st place, gold medalist(s)	Caterine Ibargüen	Colombia	1.84	
2nd place, silver medalist(s)	Solange Witteveen	Argentina	1.81	
3rd place, bronze medalist(s)	Marielys Rojas	Venezuela	1.78	
4	Fernanda Delfino	Brazil	1.78	
5	Mónica Freitas	Brazil	1.78	

=== Pole vault ===
Final – 9 June

Rank	Name	Nationality	Result	Notes
1st place, gold medalist(s)	Fabiana Murer	Brazil	4.50	CR
2nd place, silver medalist(s)	Alejandra García	Argentina	4.20	
3rd place, bronze medalist(s)	Joana Costa	Brazil	4.20	
4	Keisa Monterola	Venezuela	4.10	
5	Milena Agudelo	Colombia	3.90	
6	Carolina Torres	Chile	3.80	

=== Long jump ===
Final – 8 June

Rank	Name	Nationality	Result	Notes
1st place, gold medalist(s)	Maurren Higa Maggi	Brazil	6.91 (wind: +1.0 m/s)	
2nd place, silver medalist(s)	Keila Costa	Brazil	6.83 (wind: +0.2 m/s)	
3rd place, bronze medalist(s)	Caterine Ibargüen	Colombia	6.18 (wind: +0.9 m/s)	
4	Victoria Quiñónez	Ecuador	5.89 (wind: +0.6 m/s)	
5	Andréa Morales	Argentina	5.88 (wind: +0.8 m/s)	
6	Maitté Zamorano	Bolivia	5.75 (wind: +0.7 m/s)	
7	Mayra Pachito	Ecuador	5.73 (wind: +0.3 m/s)	SB

=== Triple jump ===
Final – 9 June

Rank	Name	Nationality	Result	Notes
1st place, gold medalist(s)	Keila Costa	Brazil	14.57 (wind: +0.2 m/s)	AR, CR, NR
2nd place, silver medalist(s)	Fernanda Delfino	Brazil	13.63 (wind: +0.7 m/s)	
3rd place, bronze medalist(s)	Jenifer Arveláez	Venezuela	13.52 (wind: +1.0 m/s)	
4	Lorena Mina	Ecuador	13.01 (wind: -0.1 m/s)	
5	Mayra Pachito	Ecuador	12.62 (wind: -0.1 m/s)	

=== Shot put ===
Final – 8 June

Rank	Name	Nationality	Result	Notes
1st place, gold medalist(s)	Elisângela Adriano	Brazil	17.41	
2nd place, silver medalist(s)	Luz Dary Castro	Colombia	16.35	SB
3rd place, bronze medalist(s)	Natalia Ducó	Chile	16.20	
4	Andréa Maria Brito	Brazil	15.88	
5	Rocío Comba	Argentina	15.75	
6	Johana Moreno	Colombia	13.81	

=== Discus throw ===
Final – 7 June

Rank	Name	Nationality	Result	Notes
1st place, gold medalist(s)	Elisângela Adriano	Brazil	59.85	
2nd place, silver medalist(s)	Luz Dary Castro	Colombia	52.23	SB
3rd place, bronze medalist(s)	Renata de Figueirêdo	Brazil	51.69	
4	Rocío Comba	Argentina	51.01	
5	Karen Gallardo	Chile	48.94	SB
6	Ximena Araneda	Chile	46.38	
7	Johana Moreno	Colombia	41.61	

=== Hammer throw ===
Final – 9 June

Rank	Name	Nationality	Result	Notes
1st place, gold medalist(s)	Johana Moreno	Colombia	61.93	
2nd place, silver medalist(s)	Katiusca María de Jesús	Brazil	61.57	
3rd place, bronze medalist(s)	Johana Ramírez	Colombia	61.10	
4	Josiane Soares	Brazil	59.08	
5	Karina Moya	Argentina	56.83	
6	Odette Palma	Chile	56.74	

=== Javelin throw ===
Final – 9 June

Rank	Name	Nationality	Result	Notes
1st place, gold medalist(s)	Alessandra Resende	Brazil	57.75	
2nd place, silver medalist(s)	Zuleima Araméndiz	Colombia	57.55	SB
3rd place, bronze medalist(s)	Leryn Franco	Paraguay	53.80	
4	Jucilene de Lima	Brazil	52.86	
5	Romina Maggi	Argentina	50.32	

=== Heptathlon ===
8/9 June

The highest mark recorded in each event is highlighted in yellow

Rank	Athlete	Nationality	100m H	HJ	SP	200m	LJ	JT	800m	Points	Notes
1st place, gold medalist(s)	Lucimara da Silva	Brazil	13.65/0.3	1.80	10.43	24.70/-0.6	5.79/-0.1	43.25	2:21.11	5803	CR
2nd place, silver medalist(s)	Elizete da Silva	Brazil	14.35/0.3	1.68	12.98	24.69/-0.6	6.02/-1.0	41.06	2:23.01	5727	
3rd place, bronze medalist(s)	Daniela Crespo	Argentina	15.69/+0.3	1.71	9.44	25.81/-0.6	5.14/-0.8	29.46	2:16.99	4856	
4	Andrea Bordalejo	Argentina	14.81/+0.3	1.56	10.67	26.34/-0.6	5.28/0.0	34.24	2:25.11	4846	
5	Victoria Quiñónez	Ecuador	15.63/+0.3	1.62	9.93	26.74/-0.6	5.67/-1.4	34.78	2:34.18	4736	
6	Ana Camila Pirelli	Paraguay	15.36/+0.3	1.53	11.36	26.71/-0.6	5.06/-0.5	30.46	DQ	3866	

=== 20,000 meters walk ===
Final – 7 June

Rank	Name	Nationality	Time	Notes
1st place, gold medalist(s)	Sandra Zapata	Colombia	1:37:45.94	CR, NR
2nd place, silver medalist(s)	Miriam Ramón	Ecuador	1:38:26.26	PB
3rd place, bronze medalist(s)	Tânia Spindler	Brazil	1:38:49.26	SB
4	Johana Ordóñez	Ecuador	1:40:56.09	SB
5	Carolina Flores	Venezuela	1:45:30.12	SB
	Jeanethe Mamaní	Bolivia	DNF	
	Alessandra Picagevicz	Brazil	DQ	
	Marcela Pacheco	Chile	DQ	

=== 4 x 100 meters relay ===
Final – 8 June

Rank	Nation	Competitors	Reaction time	Time	Notes
1st place, gold medalist(s)	Brazil	Thaíssa Presti; Luciana dos Santos; Lucimar de Moura; Tathiana Regina Ignácio	0.203	43.54	
2nd place, silver medalist(s)	Colombia	Felipa Palácios; Brigith Merlano; Mirtha Brock; Yomara Hinestroza	0.272	44.68	
3rd place, bronze medalist(s)	Chile	Daniela Pávez; Carolina Díaz; Fernanda Mackenna; Daniela Riderelli	0.184	45.34	NR
4	Ecuador	Lucy Jaramillo; Victoria Quiñónez; Mayra Pachito; Lorena Mina	0.228	47.21	

=== 4 x 400 meters relay ===
Final – 9 June

Rank	Nation	Competitors	Reaction time	Time	Notes
1st place, gold medalist(s)	Brazil	Josiane Tito; Sheila Ferreira; María Laura Almirão; Lucimar Teodoro	0.382	3:33.34	
2nd place, silver medalist(s)	Colombia	Felipa Palácios; Rosibel García; Mirtha Brock; Alejandra Idrovo	0.294	3:43.52	
3rd place, bronze medalist(s)	Chile	Daniela Riderelli; Daniela Pávez; Carolina Díaz; Fernanda Mackenna		3:55.13	
