= 2006 IAAF World Indoor Championships – Men's long jump =

The Men's long jump event at the 2006 IAAF World Indoor Championships was held on March 10–11.

== Medalists ==
Gold	Silver	Bronze
Ignisious Gaisah; Ghana	Irving Saladino; Panama	Andrew Howe; Italy

== Results ==
=== Qualification ===
Qualifying perf. 7.95 (Q) or 8 best performers (q) advanced to the Final.

Rank	Group	Athlete	Nationality	#1	#2	#3	Result	Notes
1	A	Irving Saladino	Panama	8.10			8.10	Q, AR
2	A	Louis Tsatoumas	Greece	8.06			8.06	Q
3	B	Andrew Howe	Italy	8.05			8.05	Q
4	A	Ignisious Gaisah	Ghana	7.95			7.95	Q
5	B	Godfrey Khotso Mokoena	South Africa	7.89	7.68	7.73	7.89	q, SB
6	B	Erivaldo Vieira	Brazil	7.60	7.63	7.88	7.88	q
7	A	Brian Johnson	United States	7.55	X	7.85	7.85	q, PB
8	A	Issam Nima	Algeria	7.84	7.64	7.84	7.84	q, NR
9	B	Bashir Ramzy	United States	7.67	7.54	7.81	7.81	
10	A	James Beckford	Jamaica	7.69	7.77	7.78	7.78	
11	A	Ruslan Gataullin	Russia	7.76	7.69	7.78	7.78	
12	B	Morten Jensen	Denmark	7.66	X	7.75	7.75	
13	B	Danut Simion	Romania	7.59	7.50	X	7.59	
14	B	Vitaliy Shkurlatov	Russia	7.54	X	7.52	7.54	
15	A	Louis Tristán	Peru	X	X	7.35	7.35	NR
16	B	Iván Pedroso	Cuba	7.27	X	X	7.27	SB
17	A	Rogério Bispo	Brazil	7.08	7.19	5.75	7.19	
	B	Salim Sdiri	France				DNS	

=== Final ===
Rank	Athlete	Nationality	#1	#2	#3	#4	#5	#6	Result	Notes
1st place, gold medalist(s)	Ignisious Gaisah	Ghana	7.86	X	8.27	8.30	8.19	X	8.30	
2nd place, silver medalist(s)	Irving Saladino	Panama	8.18	8.19	8.27	8.15	8.20	8.29	8.29	AR
3rd place, bronze medalist(s)	Andrew Howe	Italy	7.94	7.88	8.08	7.65	8.14	8.19	8.19	PB
4	Louis Tsatoumas	Greece	7.90	8.04	X	8.01	7.94	8.10	8.10	
5	Godfrey Khotso Mokoena	South Africa	X	7.69	8.01	7.97	X	7.94	8.01	NR
6	Erivaldo Vieira	Brazil	7.97	7.32	5.89	X	7.61	7.69	7.97	NR
7	Brian Johnson	United States	7.53	7.83	7.79	7.90	X	7.49	7.90	
8	Issam Nima	Algeria	X	7.77	7.84	X	7.76	7.84	7.84	NR
