= Athletics at the 2007 Pan American Games – Men's long jump =

Men's long jump at the Pan American Games

The men's long jump event at the 2007 Pan American Games was held on July 23–24.

== Medalists ==
Gold	Silver	Bronze
Irving Saladino; Panama	Wilfredo Martínez; Cuba	Bashir Ramzy; United States

== Results ==
=== Qualification ===
Qualifying perf. 7.80 (Q) or 12 best performers (q) advanced to the Final.

Rank	Group	Athlete	Nationality	#1	#2	#3	Result	Notes
1	A	Irving Saladino	Panama	8.38			8.38	Q
2	A	Rogério Bispo	Brazil	8.01			8.01	Q
3	A	Iván Pedroso	Cuba	X	7.93		7.93	Q
4	B	Erivaldo Vieira	Brazil	7.83			7.83	Q
5	A	Osbourne Moxey	Bahamas	7.67	7.71	–	7.71	q
6	B	Hugo Chila	Ecuador	7.68	7.58	6.26	7.68	q
7	B	Louis Tristán	Peru	7.55	7.32	7.35	7.55	q
8	A	Allen Simms	Puerto Rico	7.54	7.48	7.32	7.54	q
9	B	Bashir Ramzy	United States	7.49	7.39	7.44	7.49	q
10	B	Wilfredo Martínez	Cuba	7.40	7.30	7.46	7.46	q
11	A	Carlos Jorge	Dominican Republic	7.39	7.17	7.40	7.40	q
12	B	Jorge McFarlane	Peru	7.28	5.79	7.38	7.38	q
13	B	Jermaine Jackson	Jamaica	X	7.35	7.33	7.35	
14	B	Tyrone Smith	Bermuda	X	7.16	7.32	7.32	
15	B	Narc Narcisse	Haiti	X	7.24	X	7.24	
16	B	Kessel Campbell	Honduras	X	X	7.08	7.08	
17	A	LeJuan Simon	Trinidad and Tobago	X	X	7.04	7.04	
18	A	Anthony McGregor	Jamaica	6.86	6.86	X	6.86	
19	A	Joseph Pemberton	Saint Kitts and Nevis	6.86	6.66	6.39	6.86	
20	A	Joel Wade	Belize	5.97	–	–	5.97	

=== Final ===
Rank	Athlete	Nationality	#1	#2	#3	#4	#5	#6	Result	Notes
1st place, gold medalist(s)	Irving Saladino	Panama	6.66	7.69	8.13	X	6.74	8.28	8.28	
2nd place, silver medalist(s)	Wilfredo Martínez	Cuba	7.85	7.92	7.62	7.76	7.65	X	7.92	
3rd place, bronze medalist(s)	Bashir Ramzy	United States	X	7.54	7.61	X	7.66	7.90	7.90	
4	Iván Pedroso	Cuba	X	X	7.82	X	7.86	X	7.86	
5	Osbourne Moxey	Bahamas	7.81	7.36	7.46	7.53	7.53	7.55	7.81	
6	Carlos Jorge	Dominican Republic	7.56	7.59	7.54	7.63	7.51	7.29	7.63	
7	Hugo Chila	Ecuador	7.59	X	7.30	7.42	7.60	7.44	7.60	
8	Allen Simms	Puerto Rico	X	X	7.55	X	X	–	7.55	
9	Louis Tristán	Peru	7.53	7.16	X				7.53	
10	Erivaldo Vieira	Brazil	7.34	7.44	X				7.44	
11	Rogério Bispo	Brazil	X	7.26	7.44				7.44	
12	Jorge McFarlane	Peru	7.07	6.80	7.30				7.30	
