= Athletics at the 2007 Pan American Games – Men's 4 × 100 metres relay =

Men's 4 × 100 metres relay at the Pan American Games

The men's 4 x 100 metres relay at the 2007 Pan American Games was held on July 27–28.

== Medalists ==
Gold	Silver	Bronze
Brazil; Vicente de Lima; Rafael Ribeiro; Basílio de Moraes; Sandro Viana; José Carlos Moreira*	Canada; Richard Adu-Bobie; Anson Henry; Jared Connaughton; Bryan Barnett	United States; J-Mee Samuels; Monzavous Edwards; Rubin Williams; Darvis Patton

== Results ==
=== Heats ===
Qualification: First 3 teams of each heat (Q) plus the next 2 fastest (q) qualified for the final.

Rank	Heat	Nation	Athletes	Time	Notes
1	2	Canada	Richard Adu-Bobie, Anson Henry, Jared Connaughton, Bryan Barnett	38.81	Q
2	2	Brazil	Vicente de Lima, Rafael Ribeiro, Basílio de Moraes, José Carlos Moreira	38.83	Q
3	1	United States	J-Mee Samuels, Monzavous Edwards, Rubin Williams, Darvis Patton	38.93	Q
4	1	Trinidad and Tobago	Richard Thompson, Marc Burns, Emmanuel Callender, Mikel Thomas	39.02	Q
5	1	Netherlands Antilles	Prince Kwidama, Charlton Rafaela, Brian Mariano, Churandy Martina	39.41	Q
6	1	Cuba	Wilfredo Martínez, Yoan Frías, Michael Herrera, Jenris Vizcaino	39.54	q
7	1	Saint Kitts and Nevis	Allistar Clarke, Delwayne Delaney, Robert Morton, Kim Collins	39.74	q, NR
8	2	Bahamas	Shamar Sands, Troy McIntosh, Adrian Griffith, Jacobi Mitchell	40.05	Q
9	2	Argentina	José Manuel Garaventa, Mariano Jiménez, Miguel Wilken, Iván Altamirano	40.38	
10	1	Honduras	Ronald Bennett, Rolando Palacios, Jonnie Lowe, Kessel Campbell	41.49	
	2	Jamaica		DNS	

=== Final ===
Rank	Lane	Nation	Athletes	Time	Notes
1st place, gold medalist(s)	3	Brazil	Vicente de Lima, Rafael Ribeiro, Basílio de Moraes, Sandro Viana	38.81	
2nd place, silver medalist(s)	4	Canada	Richard Adu-Bobie, Anson Henry, Jared Connaughton, Bryan Barnett	38.87	
3rd place, bronze medalist(s)	5	United States	J-Mee Samuels, Monzavous Edwards, Rubin Williams, Darvis Patton	38.88	
4	6	Trinidad and Tobago	Mikel Thomas, Marc Burns, Emmanuel Callender, Keston Bledman	39.23	
5	8	Cuba	Wilfredo Martínez, Jenris Vizcaino, Yoan Frías, Dayron Robles	39.46	
6	2	Netherlands Antilles	Prince Kwidama, Charlton Rafaela, Brian Mariano, Churandy Martina	39.83	
7	7	Bahamas	Shamar Sands, Troy McIntosh, Adrian Griffith, Jacobi Mitchell	39.91	
8	1	Saint Kitts and Nevis	Allistar Clarke, Delwayne Delaney, Robert Morton, Kim Collins	40.20	
