= 2004 USA Indoor Track and Field Championships =

- Dates: February 27–29
- Host city: Boston, Massachusetts, United States
- Venue: Reggie Lewis Track and Athletic Center
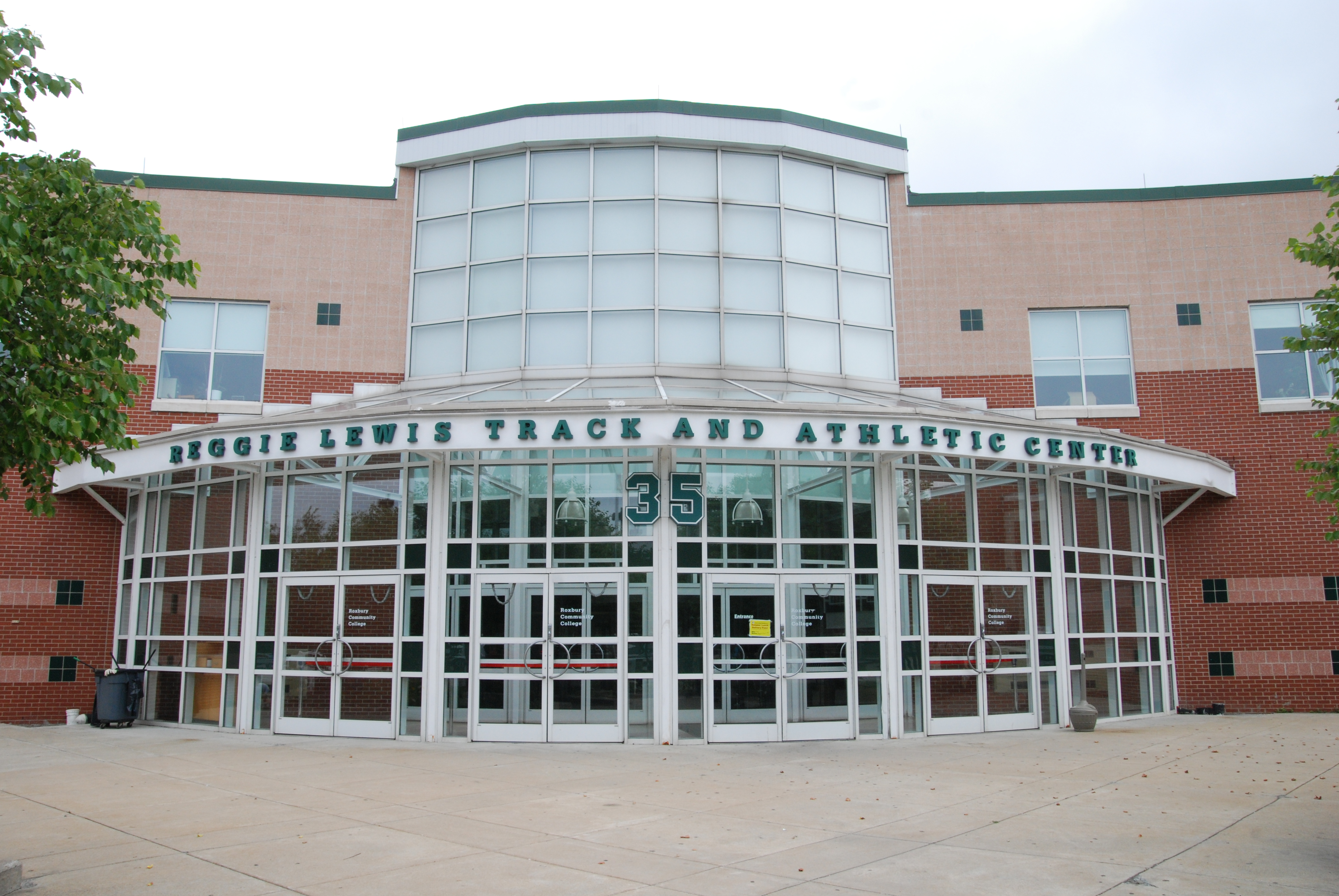
- Level: Senior
- Type: Indoor
- Events: 30 (15 men's + 15 women's)

The 2004 USA Indoor Track and Field Championships were held at the Reggie Lewis Track and Athletic Center in Boston, Massachusetts. Organized by USA Track and Field (USATF), the two-day competition took place February 27–29 and served as the national championships in indoor track and field for the United States. The championships in combined track and field events were held at a different time.

The meet was a qualifier for the U.S. team at the 2004 World Indoor Championships in Athletics. At the meeting, Jen Toomey became the first woman to win the 800 m and 1500 m in the same year.

== Medal summary ==
=== Men ===
Event	Gold		Silver	Bronze
60 m	Shawn Crawford	6.47		
200 m	Jimmie Hackley	20.83		
400 m	Milton Campbell	46.43		
800 m	Michael Stember	1:48.08		
1500 m	Rob Myers	3:40.80		
3000 m	Jonathon Riley	7:57.69		
60 m hurdles	Allen Johnson	7.44		
High jump	Jamie Nieto	2.30 m		
Pole vault	Toby Stevenson	5.80 m		
Long jump	Savanté Stringfellow	8.26 m		
Triple jump	Allen Simms	16.88 m		
Shot put	Christian Cantwell	21.26 m		
Weight throw	James Parker	23.18 m		
Heptathlon	Paul Terek	6040 pts		
5000 m walk	Tim Seaman	19:30.59		

=== Women ===
Event	Gold		Silver	Bronze
60 m	Gail Devers	7.12		
200 m	Crystal Cox	23.27		
400 m	Julian Clay	52.85		
800 m	Jennifer Toomey	2:00.02		
1500 m	Jennifer Toomey	4:09.82		
3000 m	Shayne Culpepper	9:00.59		
60 m hurdles	Gail Devers	7.81		
High jump	Amy Acuff	1.93 m		
Pole vault	Stacy Dragila	4.70 m		
Long jump	Tameisha King	6.45 m		
Triple jump	Tiombe Hurd	13.84 m		
Shot put	Laura Gerraughty	19.14 m		
Weight throw	Erin Gilreath	23.48 m		
Pentathlon	Tiffany Lott-Hogan	4224 pts		
3000 m walk	Joanne Dow	12:36.76		
