= 2004 IAAF World Indoor Championships – Men's 200 metres =

The Men's 200 metres event at the 2004 IAAF World Indoor Championships was held on March 6–7. This was the final edition of the 200 metre event before it was discontinued.

== Medalists ==
Gold	Silver	Bronze
Dominic Demeritte; Bahamas	Johan Wissman; Sweden	Tobias Unger; Germany

== Results ==
=== Heat ===
First 2 of each heat (Q) and next 1 fastest (q) qualified for the semifinals.

Rank	Heat	Name	Nationality	Time	Notes
1	7	Marcin Urbaś	Poland	20.79	Q, SB
2	5	Sebastian Ernst	Germany	20.91	Q
3	7	Jimmie Hackley	United States	20.95	Q
4	2	Johan Wissman	Sweden	20.96	Q
5	3	Tobias Unger	Germany	20.98	Q
5	5	Frankie Fredericks	Namibia	20.98	Q
7	4	Dominic Demeritte	Bahamas	20.99	Q
8	1	Joseph Batangdon	Cameroon	21.01	Q
9	5	Marcin Jędrusiński	Poland	21.02	q
10	1	Jimmy Melfort	France	21.05	Q
11	6	Allyn Condon	Great Britain	21.06	Q
12	1	Paul Hession	Ireland	21.12	
12	2	Paul Brizzel	Ireland	21.12	Q
14	3	David Alerte	France	21.15	Q
15	4	Tim Abeyie	Great Britain	21.23	Q
16	6	Coby Miller	United States	21.32	Q
17	3	LaTonel Williams	Jamaica	21.34	
18	1	Heber Viera	Uruguay	21.36	NR
19	4	Cláudio Roberto Souza	Brazil	21.39	
20	6	Oleg Sergeyev	Russia	21.55	
21	7	Géza Pauer	Hungary	21.62	
22	4	Hamoud Abdallah Al-Dalhami	Oman	21.97	NR
23	2	Louis Tristán	Peru	22.78	SB
24	1	Marcelo Figueroa	El Salvador	22.80	NR
25	6	Russel Roman	Palau	23.68	NR
26	3	Chris Meke Walasi	Solomon Islands	23.83	PB
	5	Sultan Saeed	Maldives	DQ	
	7	Jorge Conde	Nicaragua	DQ	
	2	Matic Osovnikar	Slovenia	DNS	

=== Semifinals ===
First 2 of each semifinal (Q) qualified for the final.

Rank	Heat	Name	Nationality	Time	Notes
1	2	Johan Wissman	Sweden	20.72	Q
2	3	Dominic Demeritte	Bahamas	20.75	Q, SB
3	1	Joseph Batangdon	Cameroon	20.86	Q
4	1	Marcin Urbaś	Poland	20.87	Q
4	2	Tobias Unger	Germany	20.87	Q
6	1	Allyn Condon	Great Britain	20.89	
7	3	Jimmie Hackley	United States	20.94	Q
8	3	Sebastian Ernst	Germany	21.02	
9	2	Marcin Jędrusiński	Poland	21.12	
10	2	Jimmy Melfort	France	21.28	
11	1	David Alerte	France	21.45	
12	3	Tim Abeyie	Great Britain	21.80	
13	1	Coby Miller	United States	21.95	
	2	Frankie Fredericks	Namibia	DNS	
	3	Paul Brizzel	Ireland	DNS	

=== Final ===
Rank	Lane	Name	Nationality	Time	React	Notes
1st place, gold medalist(s)	6	Dominic Demeritte	Bahamas	20.66	0.163	NR
2nd place, silver medalist(s)	5	Johan Wissman	Sweden	20.72	0.189	
3rd place, bronze medalist(s)	4	Tobias Unger	Germany	21.02	0.131	
4	3	Joseph Batangdon	Cameroon	21.16	0.178	
5	2	Jimmie Hackley	United States	21.35	0.172	
6	1	Marcin Urbaś	Poland	21.49	0.144	
