= Erivaldo Vieira =

Brazilian long jumper (born 1980)

Erivaldo da Cruz Vieira
Personal information
- Nationality: Brazilian
- Born: November 19, 1980 (age 44)

Sport
- Sport: Athletics
- Event: Long jump

Erivaldo da Cruz Vieira (born 19 November 1980 in Assis) is a Brazilian long jumper.

He finished sixth at the 2006 IAAF World Indoor Championships in Moscow in an indoor personal best of 7.97 metres.

His overall personal best jump is 8.18 metres, achieved in June 2006 in Cochabamba.

== Achievements ==
Year	Competition	Venue	Position	Notes
Representing Brazil
2005	South American Championships	Cali, Colombia	1st	8.15 m
2006	World Indoor Championships	Moscow, Russia	6th	7.97 m
2007	Pan American Games	Rio de Janeiro, Brazil	10th	7.44 m
2009	South American Championships	Lima, Peru	2nd	7.61 m
2009	Lusophony Games	Lisbon, Portugal	4th	7.63 m (w)
