= Éder Antônio Souza =

Brazilian hurdler

Personal information
- Born: 15 October 1986 (age 39)
- Height: 1.89 m (6 ft 2 in)
- Weight: 89 kg (196 lb)

Sport
- Country: Brazil
- Sport: Track and field
- Event: 110 metres hurdles

Éder Antônio Souza (born 15 October 1986) is a Brazilian hurdler. He competed in the 110 metres hurdles at the 2007 and 2015 World Championships without qualifying for the semifinals. His personal bests are 13.46 seconds in the 110 metres hurdles (+1.4 m/s, São Bernardo do Campo 2015) and 7.72 seconds in the 60 meters hurdles (Valladolid 2008).

== Competition record ==
Year	Competition	Venue	Position	Event	Notes
Representing Brazil
2004	World Junior Championships	Grosseto, Italy	6th	110 m hurdles	14.13
2005	South American Junior Championships	São Paulo, Brazil	1st	110 m hurdles	13.95
2006	Lusophony Games	Macau, China	2nd	110 m hurdles	14.06
2006	South American Games / South American U23 Championships	Buenos Aires, Argentina	2nd	110 m hurdles	13.82 (w)
2007	South American Championships	São Paulo, Brazil	2nd	110 m hurdles	13.58
2007	Pan American Games	Rio de Janeiro, Brazil	12th (h)	110 m hurdles	13.93
2007	Universiade	Bangkok, Thailand	5th	110 m hurdles	13.62
2007	World Championships	Osaka, Japan	36th (h)	110 m hurdles	13.86
2008	World Indoor Championships	Valencia, Spain	26th (h)	60 m hurdles	7.89
2008	Ibero-American Championships	Iquique, Chile	3rd	110 m hurdles	14.10
2008	South American U23 Championships	Lima, Peru	3rd	110 m hurdles	14.34
2009	South American Championships	Lima, Peru	2nd	110 m hurdles	13.97
2009	Lusophony Games	Lisbon, Portugal	4th	110 m hurdles	14.84
2011	South American Championships	Buenos Aires, Argentina	4th	110 m hurdles	13.98
2014	Ibero-American Championships	São Paulo, Brazil	4th	110 m hurdles	13.75
2015	South American Championships	Lima, Peru	4th	110 m hurdles	14.07
2015	Pan American Games	Toronto, Canada	16th (h)	110 m hurdles	13.80
2015	World Championships	Beijing, China	34th (h)	110 m hurdles	13.96
2016	Ibero-American Championships	Rio de Janeiro, Brazil	–	110 m hurdles	DQ
2016	Olympic Games	Rio de Janeiro, Brazil	17th (h)	110 m hurdles	13.61^{1}
2017	South American Championships	Asunción, Paraguay	2nd	110 m hurdles	13.49 (w)
2017	World Championships	London, United Kingdom	19th (sf)	110 m hurdles	13.70
2018	South American Games	Cochabamba, Bolivia	4th	110 m hurdles	13.70

^{1}Disqualified in the semifinals
