= Athletics at the 2008 Summer Olympics – Men's 4 × 100 metres relay =

Men's 4 × 100 metres relay at the Games of the XXIX Olympiad
- Venue: Beijing National Stadium
- Dates: August 21; August 22 (final)
- Teams: 16
- Winning time: 38.06

Medalists
1st place, gold medalist(s)		Keston Bledman; Marc Burns; Emmanuel Callender; Richard Thompson; Aaron Armstrong*	Trinidad and Tobago
2nd place, silver medalist(s)		Naoki Tsukahara; Shingo Suetsugu; Shinji Takahira; Nobuharu Asahara	Japan
3rd place, bronze medalist(s)		Vicente de Lima; Sandro Viana; Bruno de Barros; José Carlos Moreira	Brazil

Official Video Highlights @ 1:50

The men's 4 × 100 metre relay event at the 2008 Olympic Games took place on 21 and 22 August at the Beijing National Stadium.

There were 16 NOCs competing at this event. These 16 NOCs were selected by the average of the two best marks at the qualifying period. Australia was 14th but withdrew and the Netherlands was invited instead. The final was won by Jamaica in the new world-record time 37.10.

On 25 January 2017, the Jamaican team was stripped of the gold medal place due to Nesta Carter testing positive for the prohibited substance methylhexaneamine. The IOC requested that the IAAF modify the results, and, after CAS dismissed the appeal of the Jamaican team, the medals were redistributed accordingly. Trinidad and Tobago team was advanced to gold, Japan to silver, and Brazil to bronze.

== Records ==
Prior to this competition, the existing world and Olympic records were as follows.

World record	United States; Michael Marsh; Leroy Burrell; Dennis Mitchell; Carl Lewis; United States; Jon Drummond; Andre Cason; Dennis Mitchell; Leroy Burrell	37.40 s	Barcelona Stuttgart	8 August 1992 21 August 1993
Olympic record	United States; Michael Marsh; Leroy Burrell; Dennis Mitchell; Carl Lewis	37.40 s	Barcelona	8 August 1992

== Qualification summary ==
Pos	NOC	2 races		1	2
Pos	NOC	Total	Average	1	2
1	United States	75.88	37.94	37.78	38.10
2	Jamaica	75.91	37.96	37.89	38.02
3	Great Britain	76.20	38.10	37.90	38.30
4	Japan	76.24	38.12	38.03	38.21
5	Brazil	76.26	38.13	37.99	38.27
6	Germany	77.12	38.56	38.56	38.56
7	France	77.18	38.59	38.40	38.78
8	Poland	77.23	38.62	38.61	38.62
9	Nigeria	77.34	38.67	38.43	38.91
10	Canada	77.53	38.77	38.72	38.81
11	Italy	77.56	38.78	38.54	39.02
12	Trinidad and Tobago	77.56	38.78	38.54	39.02
13	South Africa	77.80	38.90	38.75	39.05
	Australia	77.82	38.91	38.73	39.09
14	China	77.85	38.93	38.81	39.04
15	Thailand	77.89	38.95	38.94	38.95
16	Netherlands	77.95	38.98	38.92	39.03
Reserves
17	Switzerland	78.01	39.01	38.99	39.02
18	Ghana	78.08	39.04	38.91	39.17
19	Russia	78.45	39.23	39.08	39.37

== Results ==
All times shown are in seconds.

- Q denotes automatic qualification.
- q denotes fastest losers.
- DNS denotes did not start.
- DNF denotes did not finish.
- DSQ denotes disqualified
- AR denotes area record.
- NR denotes national record.
- PB denotes personal best.
- SB denotes season's best.

=== Heats ===
First 3 in each heat(Q) and the next 2 fastest(q) advance to the Final.

Heat 1

Lane	Nation	Competitors	Time	Notes
8	Trinidad and Tobago	Keston Bledman, Marc Burns, Aaron Armstrong, Richard Thompson	38.26	Q
4	Japan	Naoki Tsukahara, Shingo Suetsugu, Shinji Takahira, Nobuharu Asahara	38.52	Q, SB
3	Netherlands	Maarten Heisen, Guus Hoogmoed, Patrick van Luijk, Caimin Douglas	38.87	Q, SB
2	Brazil	José Carlos Moreira, Bruno de Barros, Vicente de Lima, Sandro Viana	39.01	q
6	Nigeria	Onyeabor Ngwogu, Obinna Metu, Chinedu Oriala, Uchenna Emedolu	DNF	
9	Poland	Marcin Nowak, Łukasz Chyła, Marcin Jędrusiński, Dariusz Kuć	DNF	
5	South Africa	Hannes Dreyer, Leigh Julius, Ishmael Kumbane, Thuso Mpuang	DNF	
7	United States	Rodney Martin, Travis Padgett, Darvis Patton, Tyson Gay	DNF	

Heat 2

Lane	Nation	Competitors	Time	Notes
6	Jamaica	Dwight Thomas, Michael Frater, Nesta Carter, Asafa Powell	38.31	Disqualified
2	Canada	Hank Palmer, Anson Henry, Jared Connaughton, Pierre Browne	38.77	Q
3	Germany	Tobias Unger, Till Helmke, Alexander Kosenkow, Martin Keller	38.93	Q
9	China	Wen Yongyi, Zhang Peimeng, Lu Bin, Hu Kai	39.13	q
7	Thailand	Apinan Sukaphai, Siriroj Darasuriyong, Sompote Suqannarangsri, Sittichai Suwonprateep	39.40	
4	France	Yannick Lesourd, Martial Mbandjock, Manuel Reynaert, Samuel Coco-Viloin	39.53	
5	Great Britain	Simeon Williamson, Tyrone Edgar, Marlon Devonish, Craig Pickering	DSQ	
8	Italy	Fabio Cerutti, Simone Collio, Emanuele Di Gregorio, Jacques Riparelli	DSQ	

=== Final ===
Rank	Lane	Nation	Competitors	Time	Notes
1st place, gold medalist(s)	4	Trinidad and Tobago	Keston Bledman, Marc Burns, Emmanuel Callender, Richard Thompson, Aaron Armstrong*	38.06	
2nd place, silver medalist(s)	7	Japan	Naoki Tsukahara, Shingo Suetsugu, Shinji Takahira, Nobuharu Asahara	38.15	SB
3rd place, bronze medalist(s)	3	Brazil	Vicente de Lima, Sandro Viana, Bruno de Barros, José Carlos Moreira	38.24	SB
4	9	Germany	Tobias Unger, Till Helmke, Alexander Kosenkow, Martin Keller	38.58	
5	6	Canada	Hank Palmer, Anson Henry, Jared Connaughton, Pierre Browne	38.66	SB
	8	Netherlands	Maarten Heisen, Guus Hoogmoed, Patrick van Luijk, Caimin Douglas	DSQ; 45.81	
	5	Jamaica	Nesta Carter, Michael Frater, Usain Bolt, Asafa Powell	DSQ; 37.10	Disqualified (doping)
	2	China	Wen Yongyi, Zhang Peimeng, Lu Bin, Hu Kai	DSQ	

- Note: * Indicates athletes who ran in heats and also received medals.
