= José Carlos Moreira =

Brazilian sprinter (born 1983)

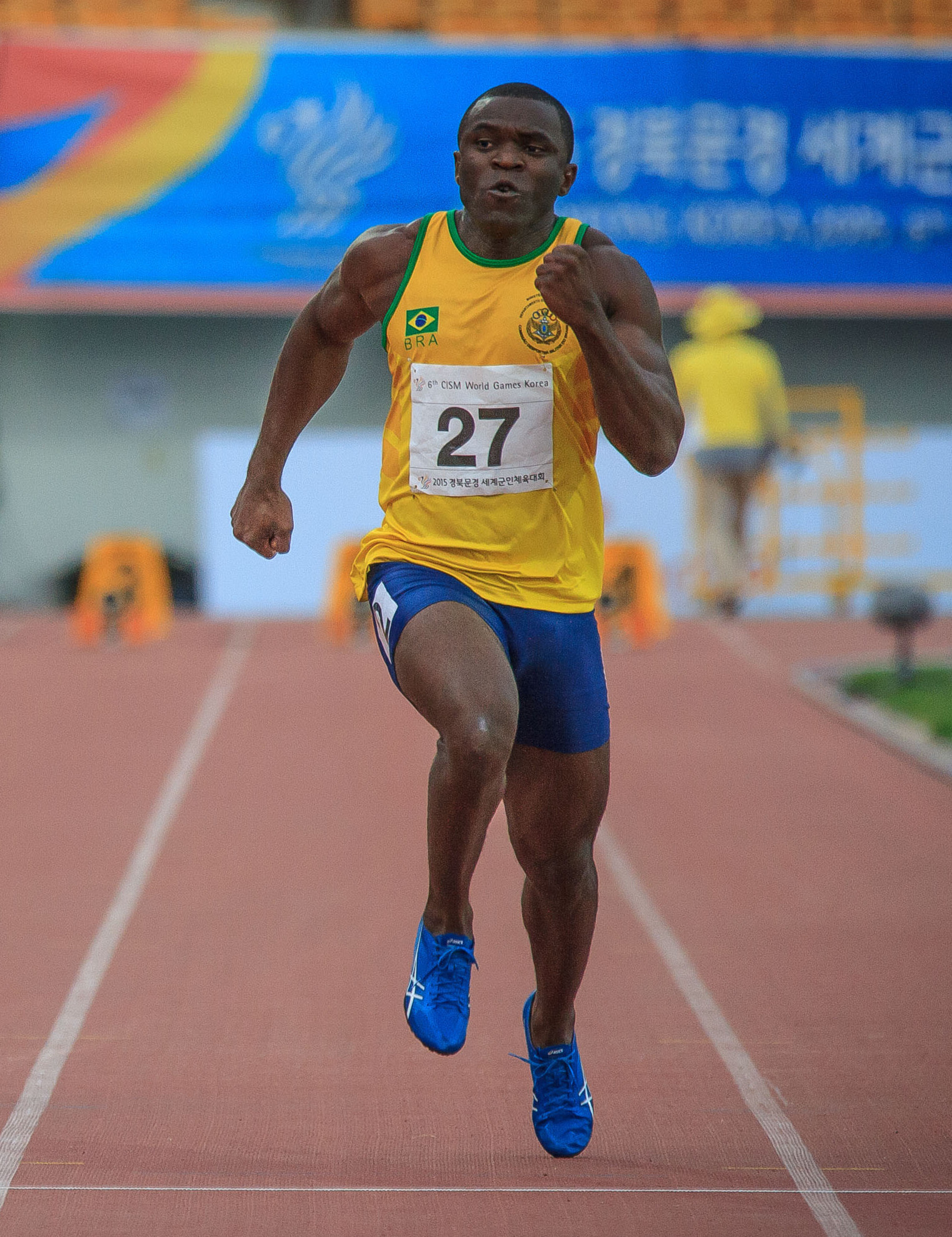
- José Carlos Moreira at the 2015 Military World Games

Personal information
- Full name: José Carlos Gomes Moreira
- Born: September 28, 1983 (age 43) Codó, Maranhão, Brazil
- Height: 1.72 m (5 ft 8 in)
- Weight: 76 kg (168 lb)

Sport
- Country: Brazil
- Sport: Athletics
- Event: Sprint
Medal record
Men's Athletics
Representing Brazil
Olympic Games
Bronze medal – third place	2008 Beijing	4 × 100 m relay
Lusophony Games
Silver medal – second place	2009 Lusophony Games	100 m
- Updated on 17 June 2014

José Carlos Gomes Moreira (born 28 September 1983 in Codó) is a Brazilian sprinter who specializes in the 100 metres. His personal best time is 10.15 seconds, achieved in May 2009 in São Paulo.

He competed at the 2006 World Indoor Championships, the 2007 World Championships, the 2008 World Indoor Championships and the 2008 Olympic Games without reaching the final. In Beijing he competed at the 100 metres sprint and placed 3rd in his heat after Tyson Gay and Olusoji Fasuba in a time of 10.29 seconds. He qualified for the second round in which he failed to qualify for the semi-finals with a time of 10.32 and only the sixth time of his heat. Together with Sandro Viana, Vicente de Lima and Bruno de Barros he also competed at the 4 × 100 metres relay. In their qualification heat they placed fourth behind Trinidad and Tobago, Japan and the Netherlands. Their time of 39.01 was the seventh out of sixteen participating nations in the first round and they qualified for the final. There they sprinted to a time of 38.24 seconds, the fourth time after the Jamaican, Trinidad and Japanese teams.

Moreira could retrospectively be awarded the bronze medal for the 4 × 100 metres relay at the 2008 Summer Olympics following the demotion in 2017 of the Jamaican team for Nesta Carter's failed anti-doping test.

== Personal bests ==
- 100 m: 10.15 s (wind: +1.9 m/s) – (Brazil) São Paulo, 2 May 2009
- 200 m: 21.00 s (wind: +1.7 m/s) – (Brazil) São Paulo, 5 August 2006

== Achievements ==
Year	Competition	Venue	Position	Event	Notes
Representing Brazil
2005	South American Championships	Cali, Colombia	1st	4 × 100 m relay	39.17
2006	South American Championships	Tunja, Colombia	3rd	100 m	10.51
2006	South American Championships	Tunja, Colombia	1st	4 × 100 m relay	39.03
2007	South American Championships	São Paulo, Brazil	4th	100 m	10.67 (wind: -0.7 m/s)
2007	Pan American Games	Rio de Janeiro, Brazil	1st	4 × 100 m relay	38.83
2007	World Championships	Osaka, Japan	33rd (h)	100 m	10.46
2008	World Indoor Championships	Valencia, Spain	3rd (h)	60 m	6.79
2008	Ibero-American Championships	Iquique, Chile	1st	100 m	10.54
2008	Ibero-American Championships	Iquique, Chile	1st	4 × 100 m relay	38.96
2008	Olympic Games	Beijing, China	28th (qf)	100 m	10.32
2008	Olympic Games	Beijing, China	3rd	4 × 100 m relay	38.24
2009	South American Championships	Lima, Peru	3rd	100 m	10.49
2009	Lusophony Games	Lisbon, Portugal	2nd	100 m	10.33
2009	World Championships	Berlin, Germany	55th (h)	100 m	10.55
2009	World Championships	Berlin, Germany	7th	4 × 100 m relay	38.56
2013	South American Championships	Cartagena, Colombia	4th	100 m	10.38
2013	South American Championships	Cartagena, Colombia	1st	4 × 100 m relay	39.47
2014	South American Games	Santiago, Chile	–	100 m	DQ
2015	South American Championships	Lima, Peru	3rd (h)	100 m	10.76 (wind: -0.9 m/s)
2015	World Championships	Beijing, China	—	4 × 100 m relay	DNF
