= Vicente de Lima =

Brazilian sprinter (born 1977)

Personal information
- Full name: Vicente Lenílson de Lima
- Nationality: Brazil
- Born: 4 June 1977 (age 49) Currais Novos, Rio Grande do Norte, Brazil
- Height: 1.69 m (5 ft 7 in)
- Weight: 58 kg (128 lb)

Sport
- Sport: Running
- Event: Sprints

Achievements and titles
- Personal bests: 100 m: 10.13 s (São Paulo 2004); 200 m: 20.39 s (Belém 2004)
Medal record
Men's Athletics
Representing Brazil
Olympic Games
| Silver medal – second place | 2000 Sydney | 4 × 100 m relay |
| Bronze medal – third place | 2008 Beijing | 4 × 100 m relay |
World Championships
| Silver medal – second place | 2003 Paris | 4 × 100 m relay |
South American Championships
| Gold medal – first place | 2007 São Paulo | 100 m |
| Gold medal – first place | 2007 São Paulo | 4 × 100 m relay |
Military World Games
| Gold medal – first place | 2011 Rio de Janeiro | 4 × 100 m relay |
Lusofonia Games
| Gold medal – first place | 2009 Lisbon | 39.30 m |
- Updated on 14 October 2015

Vicente Lenílson de Lima (born 4 June 1977) is a Brazilian sprinter specializing in the 100 metres, 200 metres, and the 4 × 100 metres relay.

De Lima represented Brazil at the 2000 Summer Olympics in Sydney. The 37.90 seconds were not enough to beat the 37.61 seconds of the United States, but De Lima, Edson Ribeiro, André Domingos and Claudinei da Silva managed to finish before the Cuban team who timed 38.04 seconds. At the 2003 World Championships he and his teammates won the silver medal at the 4 × 100 metres relay. At the 2008 Summer Olympics in Beijing he competed at the 100 metres sprint and placed 3rd in his heat, just 0.06 after Usain Bolt and 0.02 after Daniel Bailey in a time of 10.26 seconds. He qualified for the second round in which he ran slower with 10.31, resulting in a sixth place and elimination for the semi-finals. Together with José Carlos Moreira, Sandro Viana and Bruno de Barros he also competed at the 4 × 100 metres relay. In their qualification heat they placed fourth behind Trinidad and Tobago, Japan and the Netherlands. Their time of 39.01 was the seventh out of sixteen participating nations in the first round and they qualified for the final. There they sprinted to a time of 38.24 seconds, the fourth time after the Jamaican, Trinidad and Japanese teams.

De Silva would retroactively be awarded the bronze medal for the 4 × 100 metres relay at the 2008 Summer Olympics following the demotion of the Jamaican team in 2017 for Nesta Carter's failed anti-doping test.

== Personal bests ==
- 100 m: 10.13 s (wind: +0.7 m/s) – São Paulo, Brazil, 6 June 2004
- 100 m: 10.08 s (wind: +3.0 m/s) – Guatemala City, Guatemala, 11 May 2002
- 200 m: 20.39 s (wind: -1.0 m/s) – Belém, Brazil, 23 May 2004
- 4 × 100 m: 37.90 s – Sydney, Australia, 30 September 2000

== Achievements ==
| Year | Competition | Venue | Position | Event | Notes |
Representing the Brazil
| 1997 | World Championships | Athens, Greece | 6th | 4 × 100 m relay | 38.48 |
| 1999 | World Championships | Seville, Spain | 7th (qf) | 100 m | 10.36 (wind: +0.3 m/s) |
| 2000 | Ibero-American Championships | Rio de Janeiro, Brazil | 1st | 100 m | 10.28 (wind: +0.0 m/s) |
| 2000 | Ibero-American Championships | Rio de Janeiro, Brazil | 1st | 4 × 100 m relay | 38.24 |
| 2000 | Olympic Games | Sydney, Australia | 20th (qf) | 100 m | 10.28 (wind: +0.8 m/s) |
| 2000 | Olympic Games | Sydney, Australia | 2nd | 4 × 100 m relay | 37.90 |
| 2001 | South American Championships | Manaus, Brazil | 1st | 4 × 100 m relay | 38.67 |
| 2002 | Ibero-American Championships | Guatemala City, Guatemala | 2nd | 100 m | 10.08 w (wind: +3.0 m/s) |
| 2002 | Ibero-American Championships | Guatemala City, Guatemala | 1st | 4 × 100 m relay | 38.58 |
| 2003 | World Indoor Championships | Birmingham, United Kingdom | 6th (sf) | 60 m | 6.70 |
| 2003 | Pan American Games | Santo Domingo, Dominican Republic | 1st | 4 × 100 m relay | 38.44 |
| 2003 | World Championships | Saint-Denis, France | 2nd | 4 × 100 m relay | 38.26 |
| 2004 | Ibero-American Championships | Huelva, Spain | 1st | 100 m | 10.15 (wind: +0.0 m/s) |
| 2004 | Ibero-American Championships | Huelva, Spain | 1st | 4 × 100 m relay | 38.62 |
| 2004 | Olympic Games | Athens, Greece | 16th (sf) | 100 m | 10.28 (wind: +0.2 m/s) |
| 2004 | Olympic Games | Athens, Greece | 8th | 4 × 100 m relay | 38.67 |
| 2005 | South American Championships | Cali, Colombia | 2nd | 100 m | 10.37 (wind: +0.2 m/s) |
| 2005 | South American Championships | Cali, Colombia | 1st (h) | 200 m | 21.16 (wind: +0.3 m/s) |
| 2005 | South American Championships | Cali, Colombia | 1st | 4 × 100 m relay | 39.17 |
| 2006 | World Indoor Championships | Moscow, Russia | 7th | 60 m | 6.62 |
| 2006 | Ibero-American Championships | Ponce, Puerto Rico | 1st | 100 m | 10.22 (wind: +0.3 m/s) |
| 2006 | Ibero-American Championships | Ponce, Puerto Rico | 2nd (h) | 200 m | 21.37 (wind: -1.6 m/s) |
| 2006 | Ibero-American Championships | Ponce, Puerto Rico | 2nd | 4 × 100 m relay | 40.52 |
| 2006 | South American Championships | Tunja, Colombia | 2nd (h) | 100 m | 10.61 (wind: -3.8 m/s) |
| 2006 | South American Championships | Tunja, Colombia | 1st | 4 × 100 m relay | 39.03 |
| 2007 | South American Championships | São Paulo, Brazil | 1st | 100 m | 10.36 (wind: -0.7 m/s) |
| 2007 | South American Championships | São Paulo, Brazil | 1st | 4 × 100 m relay | 38.77 |
| 2007 | Pan American Games | Rio de Janeiro, Brazil | 7th | 100 m | 10.37 (wind: +1.0 m/s) |
| 2007 | Pan American Games | Rio de Janeiro, Brazil | 1st | 4 × 100 m relay | 38.81 |
| 2007 | World Championships | Osaka, Japan | 6th (qf) | 100 m | 10.38 (wind: -0.3 m/s) |
| 2007 | World Championships | Osaka, Japan | 4th | 4 × 100 m relay | 37.99 |
| 2008 | World Indoor Championships | Valencia, Spain | 5th | 60 m | 6.60 |
| 2008 | Ibero-American Championships | Iquique, Chile | 1st | 4 × 100 m relay | 38.96 |
| 2008 | Olympic Games | Beijing, China | 7th (qf) | 100 m | 10.31 (wind: -0.1 m/s) |
| 2008 | Olympic Games | Beijing, China | 3rd | 4 × 100 m relay | 38.24 |
| 2009 | South American Championships | Lima, Peru | 2nd | 4 × 100 m relay | 39.46 |
| 2009 | Lusofonia Games | Lisbon, Portugal | 1st | 4 × 100 m relay | 39.30 |
| 2009 | World Championships | Berlin, Germany | 7th | 4 × 100 m relay | 38.56 |
| 2010 | World Indoor Championships | Doha, Qatar | 15th (sf) | 60 m | 6.69 |
| 2011 | Military World Games | Rio de Janeiro, Brazil | 1st | 4 × 100 m relay | 39.53 |

Sporting positions
| Preceded by (Brazil) Claudinei da Silva | Brazil's National Champion 100 metres 2000 | Succeeded by (Brazil) Claudinei da Silva (Brazil) Raphael de Oliveira |
| Preceded by (Brazil) Claudinei da Silva (Brazil) Raphael de Oliveira | Brazil's National Champion 100 metres 2002 | Succeeded by (Brazil) Édson Ribeiro |
| Preceded by (Brazil) Édson Ribeiro | Brazil's National Champion 100 metres 2004–2005 | Most recent |
