= 2007 World Championships in Athletics – Men's long jump =

The Men's Long Jump event at the 2007 World Championships in Athletics took place on August 29, 2007 (qualification) and August 30, 2007 (final) at the Nagai Stadium in Osaka, Japan. There were a total number of 34 competing athletes from 25 countries.

== Medallists ==
Gold	Irving Saladino; Panama (PAN)
Silver	Andrew Howe; Italy (ITA)
Bronze	Dwight Phillips; United States (USA)

== Records ==
World Record	Mike Powell (USA)	8.95	Tokyo, Japan	30 August 1991
Championship Record	Mike Powell (USA)	8.95	Tokyo, Japan	30 August 1991

== Qualification ==
=== Group A ===
Place	Athlete	Nation	1	2	3	Mark	Notes
1	Dwight Phillips	United States	8.22			8.22	Q
2	Christian Reif	Germany	7.95	7.44	8.19	8.19	Q PB
3	Andrew Howe	Italy	X	8.17		8.17	Q
4	Irving Saladino	Panama	X	8.13	X	8.13	q
5	Olexiy Lukashevych	Ukraine	8.11	X	−	8.11	q SB
6	Hussein Taher Al-Sabee	Saudi Arabia	7.82	X	8.01	8.01	q SB
7	Trevell Quinley	United States	6.03	7.65	7.99	7.99	q
8	Arnaud Casquette	Mauritius	7.65	7.93	7.73	7.93	
9	Nikolay Atanasov	Bulgaria	7.89	7.63	7.88	7.89	
10	Christopher Tomlinson	Great Britain & N.I.	7.89	7.80	7.64	7.89	
11	Mohamed Salman Al Khuwalidi	Saudi Arabia	X	7.73	7.85	7.85	
12	Rogério Bispo	Brazil	X	5.63	7.74	7.74	
13	Li Runrun	China	7.66	X	7.66	7.66	
14	Daisuke Arakawa	Japan	7.62	X	X	7.62	
15	Morten Jensen	Denmark	X	7.53	X	7.53	
16	Louis Tristán	Peru	7.51	7.37		7.51	

=== Group B ===
Place	Athlete	Nation	1	2	3	Mark	Notes
1	Godfrey Khotso Mokoena	South Africa	8.10	7.96	8.28	8.28	Q
2	James Beckford	Jamaica	7.95	8.11	8.22	8.22	Q
3	Ahmed Faiz Bin Marzouq	Saudi Arabia	8.12	8.05	8.07	8.12	q SB
4	Miguel Pate	United States	8.10	7.84	X	8.10	q
5	Ndiss Kaba Badji	Senegal	8.02	7.66	8.04	8.04	q
6	Marcin Starzak	Poland	7.75	7.84	7.92	7.92	
7	Issam Nima	Algeria	7.88	X	X	7.88	
8	Ruslan Gataullin	Russia	X	7.71	7.83	7.83	
9	Gable Garenamotse	Botswana	7.77	7.59	X	7.77	
10	Greg Rutherford	Great Britain & N.I.	X	7.77	X	7.77	
11	Zhang Xiaoyi	China	X	7.67	7.74	7.74	
12	Yahya Berrabah	Morocco	X	X	7.72	7.72	SB
13	Chris Noffke	Australia	X	7.54	X	7.54	
14	Hatem Mersal	Egypt	7.24	7.42	7.24	7.42	
	Walter Davis	United States	X	X	X	NM	
	Nelson Évora	Portugal				DNS	

== Final ==
Rank	Athlete	Nation	Attempts						Distance	Note
Rank	Athlete	Nation	1	2	3	4	5	6	Distance	Note
1st place, gold medalist(s)	Irving Saladino	Panama	X	8.30	8.46	X	X	8.57	8.57 m	AR
2nd place, silver medalist(s)	Andrew Howe	Italy	X	8.13	X	8.12	8.20	8.47	8.47 m	NR
3rd place, bronze medalist(s)	Dwight Phillips	United States	8.30	X	X	8.02	X	8.22	8.30 m	
4	Olexiy Lukashevych	Ukraine	X	8.17	X	8.05	8.13	8.25	8.25 m	SB
5	Godfrey Khotso Mokoena	South Africa	7.98	7.86	8.19	8.18	8.15	8.19	8.19 m	
6	James Beckford	Jamaica	8.09	8.03	8.00	8.17	8.17	X	8.17 m	
7	Ndiss Kaba Badji	Senegal	7.90	8.01	X	7.90	X	7.64	8.01 m	
8	Ahmed Faiz	Saudi Arabia	X	7.98	7.70	X	—	X	7.98 m	
9	Christian Reif	Germany	7.86	7.77	7.95				7.95 m	
10	Miguel Pate	United States	X	7.73	7.94				7.94 m	
11	Hussein Al-Sabee	Saudi Arabia	7.71	7.30	7.84				7.84 m	
—	Trevell Quinley	United States	X	X	X				NM	
