= Wilfredo Martínez =

Cuban long jumper

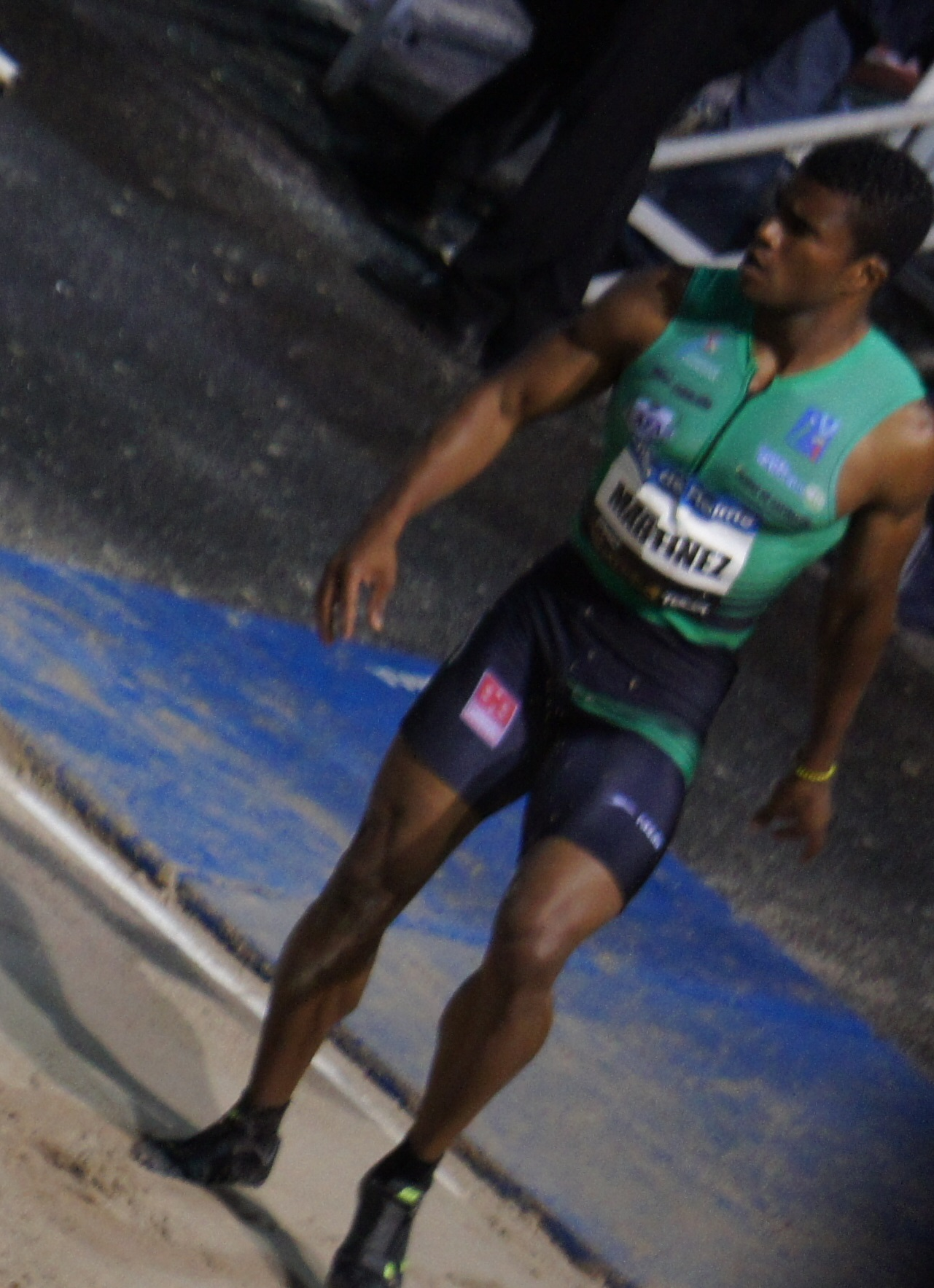

Personal information
- Full name: Wilfredo Yaniel Martínez Caraballoso
- Born: January 9, 1985 (age 41) Marianao, La Habana
- Height: 1.80 m (5 ft 11 in)
- Weight: 83 kg (183 lb)

Sport
- Country: Cuba
- Sport: Athletics
Medal record
Representing Cuba
Pan American Games
Silver medal – second place	2007 Rio de Janeiro	Long jump
- Updated on 22 May 2013

Wilfredo Yaniel Martínez Caraballoso (Spanish pronunciation: [wilˈfɾeðo maɾˈtines]; born 9 January 1985 in Marianao, La Habana) is a Cuban long jumper.

== Career ==
His personal best jump is 8.31 metres, achieved in July 2008 in Cali. He won the silver medal at the 2007 Pan American Games, finished eighth at the 2008 World Indoor Championships and fifth at the 2008 Olympic Games. In 2016 he was disqualified from the 2008 Olympics for doping, and his result was annulled after his 2008 sample was re-tested and failed.

== Personal bests ==
Outdoor

- Long jump: 8.31 m A (wind: +1.6 m/s) – (Colombia) Cali, 6 July 2008
- Triple jump: 15.55 m – (Cuba) La Habana, 14 February 2003

Indoor

- Long jump: 8.18 m – (Spain) Madrid, 20 February 2010

== Competition record ==
Year	Competition	Venue	Position	Event	Notes
Representing Cuba
2003	Pan American Junior Championships	Bridgetown, Barbados	1st	Long jump	7.70 m (wind: +0.2 m/s)
2003	Pan American Junior Championships	Bridgetown, Barbados	4th	Triple jump	15.49 m (wind: +0.1 m/s)
2005	ALBA Games	La Habana, Cuba	2nd	Long jump	7.67 m (wind: +0.0 m/s)
2005	Central American and Caribbean Championships	Nassau, Bahamas	4th	Long jump	7.56 m w (wind: +3.3 m/s)
2006	NACAC U-23 Championships	Santo Domingo, Dominican Republic	1st	Long jump	8.03 m (wind: +0.1 m/s)
2007	ALBA Games	Caracas, Venezuela	1st	Long jump	8.17 m (wind: +0.9 m/s)
2007	Pan American Games	Rio de Janeiro, Brazil	2nd	Long jump	7.92 m (wind: +0.1 m/s)
2007	Pan American Games	Rio de Janeiro, Brazil	5th	4 × 100 m relay	39.46 s
2008	World Indoor Championships	Valencia, Spain	8th	Long jump	7.72 m
2008	Central American and Caribbean Championships	Cali, Colombia	1st	Long jump	8.31 m A (wind: +1.6 m/s)
2008	Olympic Games	Beijing, China	5th	Long jump	~~8.19 m (wind: -0.4 m/s)~~ DSQ
2009	ALBA Games	La Habana, Cuba	2nd	Long jump	8.05 m w (wind: +4.2 m/s)
2009	Central American and Caribbean Championships	La Habana, Cuba	–	Long jump	NM
2010	World Indoor Championships	Doha, Qatar	–	Long jump	NM
2010	Ibero-American Championships	San Fernando, Spain	1st	Long jump	8.04 m (wind: -0.3 m/s)
