= Bruno de Barros =

Brazilian sprinter (born 1987)

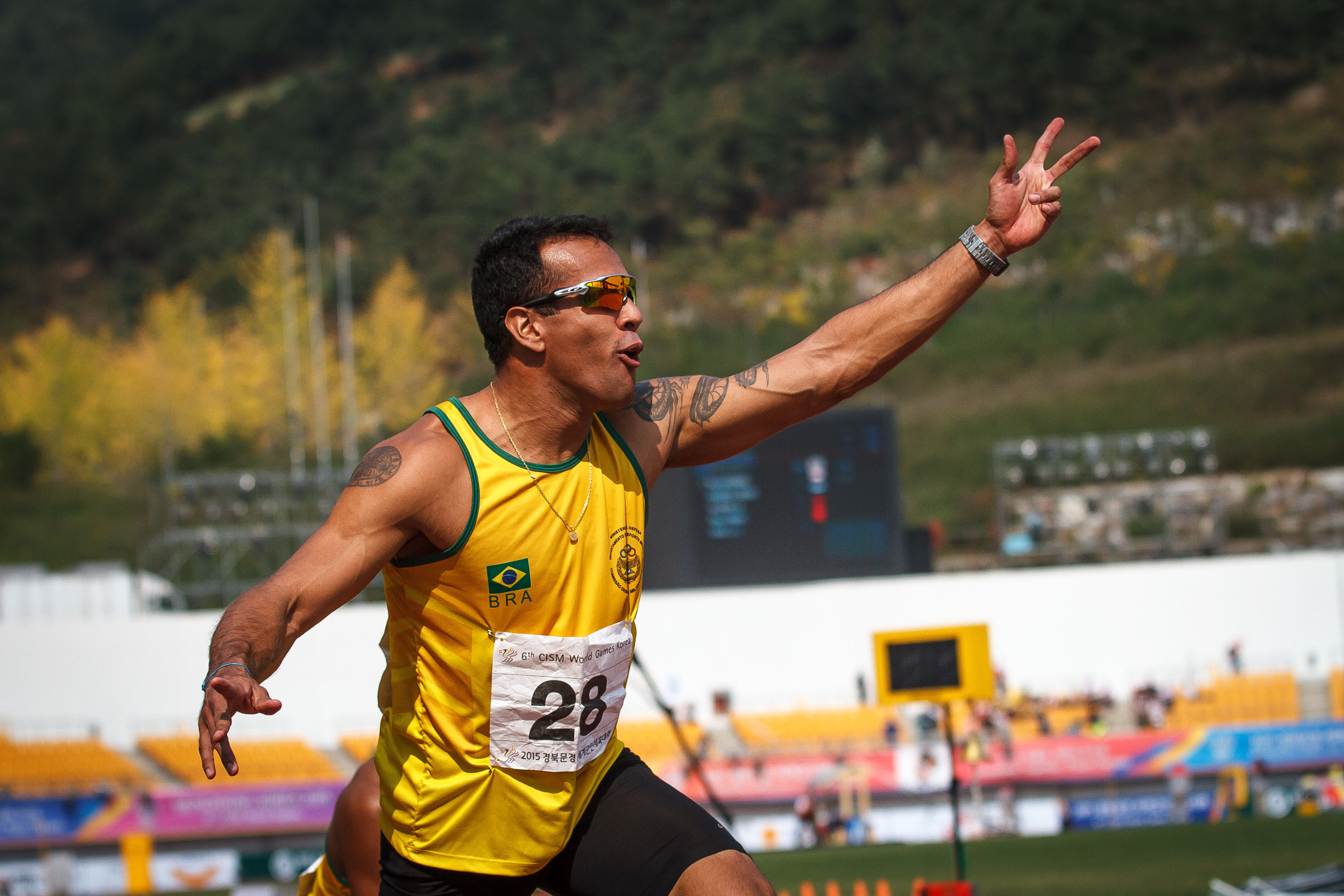
- Barros in 2015

Personal information
- Full name: Bruno Lins Tenório de Barros
- Born: 7 January 1987 (age 39) Maceió, Alagoas, Brazil
- Height: 1.82 m (6 ft 0 in)
- Weight: 85 kg (187 lb)

Sport
- Country: Brazil
- Sport: Athletics
- Event: 200 metres
Medal record
Men's athletics
Representing Brazil
Olympics
Bronze medal – third place	2008 Beijing	4 × 100 m relay
South American Championships
Silver medal – second place	2013 Cartagena	100 m
Lusophony Games
Gold medal – first place	2006 Macau	200 m
- Updated on 13 April 2014

Bruno Lins Tenório de Barros (born 7 January 1987) is a Brazilian sprinter who specializes in the 200 metres.

== Biography ==
Barros was born in Maceió and resides in São Bernardo do Campo. He represented Brazil at the 2008 Summer Olympics in Beijing. He competed in the 4 × 100 metres relay together with José Carlos Moreira, Vicente de Lima and Sandro Viana. In their qualification heat they placed fourth behind Trinidad and Tobago, Japan and the Netherlands. Their time of 39.01 was the seventh out of sixteen participating nations in the first round and they qualified for the final. There they sprinted to a time of 38.24 seconds, the fourth time after the Jamaican, Trinidad and Japanese teams. He also took part in the 200 metres individual, finishing fifth with a time of 21.15 seconds in his first round heat, which was not enough to qualify for the second round.

His personal best time is 20.47, achieved in February 2008 in São Paulo. He also has 10.22 seconds in the 100 metres, achieved in March 2008 in São Paulo.

In 2009, he was suspended by the IAAF for 2 years for a doping offence involving the drug rh-EPO.

He represented Brazil in the 1st Lusophone Games that took place in Macau, China in 2006; in the 2nd Lusophony Games in Lisbon, Portugal; and also in the 2012 Summer Olympics, again in both the 200 m and the 4 × 100 m relay.

Barros would retroactively be awarded the bronze medal for the 4 × 100 metres relay at the 2008 Summer Olympics following the demotion in 2017 of the Jamaican team for Nesta Carter's failed anti-doping test.

== Personal bests ==
- 100 m: 10.16 (wind: +1.8 m/s) – São Paulo, Brazil, 21 March 2009
- 200 m: 20.16 (wind: +1.1 m/s) – São Paulo, Brazil, 7 August 2011

== International competitions ==
Year	Competition	Venue	Position	Event	Notes
Representing Brazil
2004	South American Youth Championships	Guayaquil, Ecuador	1st	4 × 100 m relay	42.42 s
2006	Lusophony Games	Macau, China	1st	200 m	21.56 (wind: +0.2 m/s)
2006	South American U-23 Championships	Buenos Aires, Argentina	6th	200 m	21.20 w (wind: +2.3 m/s)
2006	South American U-23 Championships	Buenos Aires, Argentina	2nd	4 × 100 m relay	40.15
2008	Ibero-American Championships	Iquique, Chile	2nd	200 m	20.95 (wind: -0.5 m/s)
2008	Ibero-American Championships	Iquique, Chile	1st	4 × 100 m relay	38.96
2008	Olympic Games	Beijing, China	5th (h)	200 m	21.15 (wind: -1.1 m/s)
2008	Olympic Games	Beijing, China	3rd	4 × 100 m relay	38.24
2008	South American U-23 Championships	Lima, Peru	2nd	100 m	10.70 A (wind: -2.0 m/s)
2008	South American U-23 Championships	Lima, Peru	1st	200 m	21.13 A (wind: -1.0 m/s)
2008	South American U-23 Championships	Lima, Peru	1st	4 × 100 m relay	40.06
2008	South American U-23 Championships	Lima, Peru	1st	4 × 400 m relay	3:09.02
2009	South American Championships	Lima, Peru	–	200 m	DQ
2009	Lusophony Games	Lisbon, Portugal	–	200 m	DQ
2009	Lusophony Games	Lisbon, Portugal	–	4 × 100 m relay	DQ
2011	World Championships	Daegu, South Korea	6th	200 m	20.31 (wind: +0.8 m/s)
2011	World Championships	Daegu, South Korea	–	4 × 100 m relay	DQ
2011	Pan American Games	Guadalajara, Mexico	3rd	200 m	20.45 A (wind: -1.0 m/s)
2011	Pan American Games	Guadalajara, Mexico	1st	4 × 100 m relay	38.18 A
2012	Olympic Games	London, United Kingdom	6th (sf)	200 m	20.55 (wind: -0.5 m/s)
2012	Olympic Games	London, United Kingdom	4th (h)	4 × 100 m relay	38.35
2013	South American Championships	Cartagena, Colombia	2nd	100 m	10.33 (wind: +1.3 m/s)
2013	World Championships	Moscow, Russia	19th (h)	200 m	20.60 (wind: +0.0 m/s)
2014	South American Games	Santiago, Chile	4th	200 m	20.77 (wind: -1.0 m/s)
2014	South American Games	Santiago, Chile	1st	4 × 100 m relay	38.90
2015	World Championships	Beijing, China	26th (h)	200 m	20.42
2015	World Championships	Beijing, China	—	4 × 100 m relay	DNF
2016	Olympic Games	Rio de Janeiro, Brazil	43rd (h)	200 m	20.59
2016	Olympic Games	Rio de Janeiro, Brazil	6th	4 × 100 m relay	38.41
2017	IAAF World Relays	Nassau, Bahamas	–	4 × 100 m relay	DQ
2017	South American Championships	Asunción, Paraguay	2nd	100 m	10.22
2017	South American Championships	Asunción, Paraguay	1st (h)	200 m	20.41^{1}
2017	South American Championships	Asunción, Paraguay	1st	4 × 100 m relay	39.47
2017	South American Championships	Asunción, Paraguay	2nd	4 × 400 m relay	3:07.32

^{1}Did not start in the final
