= 2008 Ibero-American Championships in Athletics =

XIII Ibero-American Championships in Athletics
- Dates: 13 – 15 June 2008
- Host city: Iquique, Chile
- Venue: Estadio Tierra de Campeones
- Events: 44
- Participation: 316 athletes from 19 nations

The 2008 Ibero-American Championships in Athletics (Spanish: XIII Campeonato Iberoamericano de Atletismo), was an athletics competition which was held at the Estadio Tierra de Campeones in Iquique, Chile from June 13 to the 15th. A total of forty-four events were contested, of which 22 by male and 22 by female athletes.

Iquique was selected as the host city for the event, in May 2006, at the Iberoamerican Athletics Confederation Congress (Congreso de la Confederación Iberoamericana de Atletismo). A running track was installed at the stadium specifically for the competition.

No championship records were set at an edition which has hampered by cold, windy whether in the Chilean city. Six national records were broken at the competition, however, including a Chilean record throw of 18.65 m by shot put winner Natalia Ducó, which was also a South American junior record. Ecuador's Bayron Piedra was another stand-out performer as he set a national record to win the 3000 metres, adding to his silver medal from the 1500 metres.

The competition was dominated by Brazilian athletes: seventeen gold medals were won by the country's athletes and it topped the medal table with a total of 44 medals – a third of those on offer. Colombia had the next most golds with five and Spain and Argentina took four each. The hosts Chile had two golds in their medal haul of eight altogether.

== Medal summary ==
=== Men ===
Event	Gold		Silver		Bronze	
100 metres (wind: -2.3 m/s)	José Carlos Moreira (BRA)	10.54	Franklin Nazareno (ECU)	10.60	Kael Becerra (CHI)	10.62
200 metres	Sandro Viana (BRA)	20.87	Bruno de Barros (BRA)	20.95	Cristián Reyes (CHI)	21.14
400 metres	Geiner Mosquera (COL)	46.63	Fernando de Almeida (BRA)	46.73	Héctor Carrasquillo (PUR)	46.92
800 metres	Andy González (CUB)	1:47.59	Fabiano Peçanha (BRA)	1:47.83	Salvador Crespo (ESP)	1:48.11
1500 metres	Fabiano Peçanha (BRA)	3:42.06	Bayron Piedra (ECU)	3:42.65	Víctor Montaner (ESP)	3:42.93
3000 metres	Bayron Piedra (ECU)	7:54.69 NR	Isaías Ataro (MEX)	7:54.70	Mario Bazán (PER)	7:57.95 NR
5000 metres	Javier Carriqueo (ARG)	13:51.14	Alejandro Suárez (MEX)	13:51.20	Juan Carlos Romero (MEX)	13:51.25
110 metres hurdles (wind: -2.0 m/s)	Paulo César Villar (COL)	13.74	Enrique Llanos (PUR)	13.89	Éder Antônio Souza (BRA)	14.10
400 metres hurdles	Mahau Suguimati (BRA)	50.07	Jeisson Rivas (COL)	50.92	Tiago Bueno (BRA)	51.20
3000 metres steeplechase	Mario Bazán (PER)	8:42.51	Francisco Lara (ESP)	8:43.57	Gládson Barbosa (BRA)	8:44.93
4×100 metres relay	Brazil (BRA); Vicente de Lima; Sandro Viana; Bruno de Barros; José Carlos Moreira	38.96	Argentina (ARG); José Manuel Garaventa; Mariano Jiménez; Miguel Wilken; Matías Usandivaras	40.28	Only two finishers	
4×400 metres relay	Cuba (CUB); Omar Cisneros; William Collazo; Yasmani Copello; Yeimer López	3:03.22	Brazil (BRA); Luís Ambrosio; Luíz Guilherme de Oliveira; André de Melo; Fernando de Almeida	3:08.45	Dominican Republic (DOM); Ramon Frías; Tayron Reyes; Gustavo Cuesta; Kelvin Herrera	3:08.70
20,000 metres walk	José Alessandro Bagio (BRA)	1:23:12.6	Juan Manuel Cano (ARG)	1:24:19.2	Patricio Ortega (ECU)	1:24:24.1
High jump	Jessé de Lima (BRA)	2.20 m	Fábio Baptista (BRA)	2.20 m	Santiago Guerci (ARG)	2.20 m
Pole vault	Henrique Martins (BRA)	5.00 m	Marcelo Terra (ARG)	5.00 m	Guillermo Chiaraviglio (ARG)	4.80 m
Long jump	Gaspar Araújo (POR)	7.82 m	Jonathan Martínez (ESP)	7.64 m	Louis Tristán (PER)	7.58 m
Triple jump	Hugo Chila (ECU)	16.31 m	Thiago Dias (BRA)	15.53 m	Leonardo Elisiario dos Santos (BRA)	15.34 m
Shot put	Borja Vivas (ESP)	19.45 m	Reinaldo Proenza (CUB)	19.42 m	Germán Lauro (ARG)	19.02 m
Discus throw	Jorge Balliengo (ARG)	59.43 m	Pedro Cuesta (ESP)	57.67 m	Ronald Julião (BRA)	56.77 m
Hammer throw	Juan Ignacio Cerra (ARG)	69.74 m	Dário Manso (POR)	68.96 m	Moisés Campeny (ESP)	68.87 m
Javelin throw	Anier Boué (CUB)	78.77 m	Noraldo Palacios (COL)	77.20 m	Víctor Fatecha (PAR)	75.81 m
Decathlon	Odirlei Pessoni (BRA)	7362 pts	Ânderson Venâncio (BRA)	6944 pts	Tiago Marto (POR)	6915 pts

=== Women ===
Event	Gold		Silver		Bronze	
100 metres (wind: -1.5 m/s)	Yomara Hinestroza (COL)	11.58	Lucimar de Moura (BRA)	11.70	Rosemar Coelho Neto (BRA)	11.74
200 metres	Darlenys Obregón (COL)	23.84	Wilmarys Álvarez (VEN)	23.85	Rosemar Coelho Neto (BRA)	23.86
400 metres	Zudikey Rodríguez (MEX)	52.14	Wilmarys Álvarez (VEN)	53.33	Maria Laura Almirão (BRA)	53.34
800 metres	Christiane dos Santos (BRA)	2:04.34	Lizaira Del Valle (PUR)	2:04.37	Cristina Guevara (MEX)	2:04.42
1500 metres	Sabine Heitling (BRA)	4:18.78	Nadia Rodríguez (ARG)	4:23.24	Elena García (ESP)	4:23.45
3000 metres	Dolores Checa (ESP)	9:16.53	Rosa Godoy (ARG)	9:22.72	Nadia Rodríguez (ARG)	9:29.58
5000 metres	Sonia Bejarano (ESP)	16:01.00	Fabiana Cristine da Silva (BRA)	16:05.45	María Isabel Montilla (VEN)	16:30.60 NR
100 metres hurdles	Francisca Guzmán (CHI)	13.56	Brigitte Merlano (COL)	13.60	Lucimara da Silva (BRA)	13.61
400 metres hurdles	Lucimar Teodoro (BRA)	56.1	Gisele Cruz (BRA)	56.8	Lucy Jaramillo (ECU)	57.9
3000 metres steeplechase	Sabine Heitling (BRA)	9:54.70	Rosa Godoy (ARG)	10:00.36 NR	Ángela Figueroa (COL)	10:02.13
4×100 metres relay	Colombia (COL); Yomara Hinestroza; Mirtha Brock; Darlenys Obregón; María Idrobo	44.89	Brazil (BRA); Lucimar de Moura; Rosemar Coelho Neto; Ana Cláudia Lemos Silva; Luciana dos Santos	44.99	Chile (CHI); Daniela Pávez; Carolina Díaz; Ljubica Milos; Sicylle Jeria	46.87
4×400 metres relay	Mexico (MEX); Ruth Grajeda; Gabriela Medina; Nallely Vela; Zudikey Rodríguez	3:33.27	Brazil (BRA); Maria Laura Almirão; Perla Regina dos Santos; Sheila Ferreira; Josiane Tito	3:34.01	Colombia (COL); Mirtha Brock; Maria Alejandra Idrobo; Kelly López; Norma González	3:39.46
10,000 metres walk	Maribel Gonçalves (POR)	45:24.59	Graciela Mendoza (MEX)	46:43.94	Cisiane Dutra Lopes (BRA)	46:54.20
High jump	Eliana da Silva (BRA)	1.87 m	Caterine Ibargüen (COL)	1.85 m	Solange Witteveen (ARG)	1.83 m
Pole vault	Joana Ribeiro Costa (BRA)	4.20 m	Carolina Torres (CHI)	4.10 m	Alejandra García (ARG) Keisa Monterola (VEN)	4.00 m
Long jump	Arantza Loureiro (ESP)	6.25 m	Eliane Martins (BRA)	6.20 m	Claudette Martínez (MEX)	5.89 m
Triple jump	Verónica Davis (VEN)	13.32 m	Laurice Cristina Félix (BRA)	12.86 m	Jennifer Arveláez (VEN)	12.84 m
Shot put	Natalia Ducó (CHI)	18.65 m AJR NR	Andréa Pereira (BRA)	16.72 m	Ahymará Espinoza (VEN)	14.98 m
Discus throw	Rocío Comba (ARG)	54.49 m	Karen Gallardo (CHI)	53.10 m NR	Elisângela Adriano (BRA)	52.82 m
Hammer throw	Rosa Rodríguez (VEN)	65.96 m	Jennifer Dahlgren (ARG)	64.89 m	Josiane Soares (BRA)	63.09 m
Javelin throw	Alessandra Resende (BRA)	56.59 m	María González (VEN)	53.20 m	Zuleima Araméndiz (COL)	53.11 m
Heptathlon	Lucimara da Silva (BRA)	5739 pts	Ana Capdevila (ESP)	5312 pts	Macarena Reyes (CHI)	5278 pts

== Medal table ==
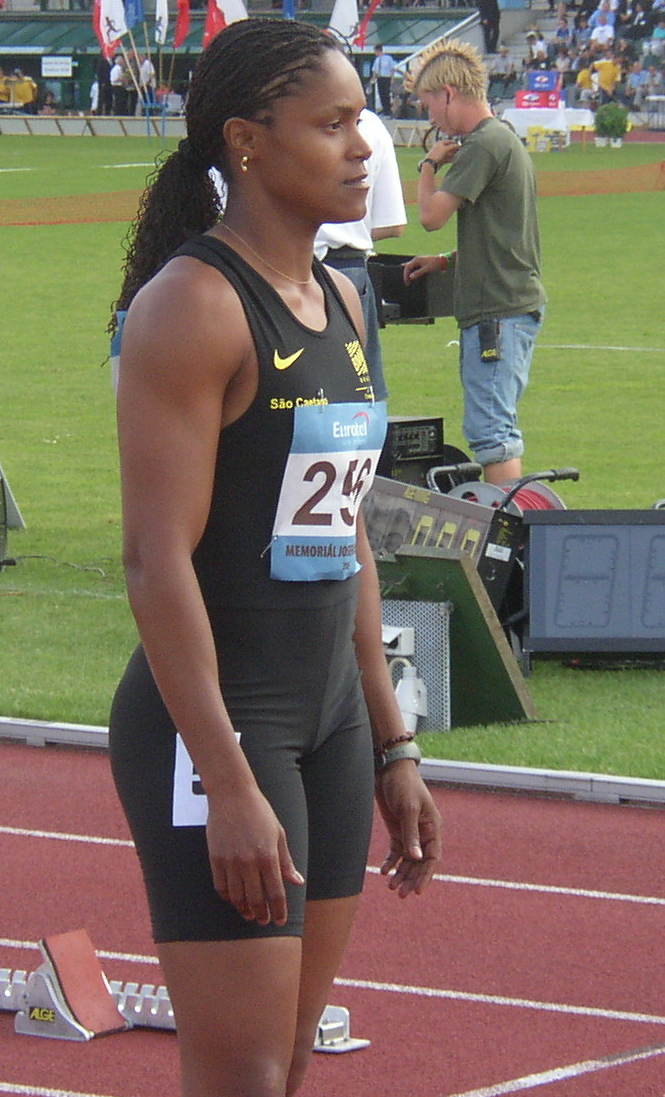
Lucimar de Moura won 100 m silver medals individually and in the relay.

* Host nation (Chile)

Rank	Nation	Gold	Silver	Bronze	Total
1	Brazil	17	15	12	44
2	Colombia	5	4	3	12
3	Argentina	4	7	6	17
4	Spain	4	4	4	12
5	Cuba	3	1	0	4
6	Venezuela	2	3	4	9
7	Mexico	2	3	3	8
8	Chile*	2	2	4	8
9	Ecuador	2	2	2	6
10	Portugal	2	1	1	4
11	Peru	1	0	2	3
12	Puerto Rico	0	2	1	3
13	Dominican Republic	0	0	1	1
13	Paraguay	0	0	1	1
Totals (14 entries)		44	44	44	132

== Participation ==
Of the twenty-eight members of the Asociación Iberoamericana de Atletismo, nineteen nations sent delegations to the 2008 championships. This represented all the organisation's members but for Guinea-Bissau. A total of 322 athletes were set to take part in the competition of which 316 actually participated.

- Argentina (33)
- Bolivia (15)
- Brazil (64)
- Chile (48)
- Colombia (23)
- Cuba (8)
- Dominican Republic (7)
- Ecuador (10)
- Guatemala (5)
- Honduras (4)
- Mexico (17)
- Panama (3)
- Paraguay (1)
- Peru (5)
- Portugal (6)
- Puerto Rico (8)
- Spain (30)
- Uruguay (2)
- Venezuela (27)
