= José Luis Vargas =

Bolivian footballer (born 1991)

Luis José Vargas García
Personal information
- Full name: Luis Luis Vargas García
- Date of birth: 31 January 1996 (age 30)
- Position: Midfielder

Senior career*
Years	Team	Apps	(Gls)
2016–18	Club Blooming	93	(7)

International career
2017	Bolivia	2	(1)
- * Club domestic league appearances and goals as of 00:15, 13 September 2022 (UTC)

Luis José Vargas García (born 31 January 1996) is a Bolivian professional footballer who last played for Guabirá in the Bolivian Primera División.

== International career ==
On June 3, 2017, Vargas started for the senior Bolivia national football team in a 1–0 win against the Nicaragua national football team. Vargas scored his first goal for Bolivia in his second game, again against Nicaragua, scoring a late winner in a 3–2 win at the Estadio Provincial, Yacuiba.
