= Richard Adu-Bobie =

Canadian sprinter (born 1985)

Personal information
- Born: 12 January 1985 (age 41) Manchester, New Hampshire, United States
- Home town: Ottawa, Canada

Sport
- Sport: Track and field
Medal record
Representing Canada
Pan American Games
| Silver medal – second place | 2007 Rio de Janeiro | 4x100m relay |

Richard Adu-Bobie (born 12 January 1985) is a Canadian sprinter. He was an alternate for Canada's 4 × 100 m relay team at the 2004 Summer Olympics. He was an alternate for the same team at the 2008 Summer Olympics.

Born in Manchester, New Hampshire to Ghanaian parents, Adu-Bobie moved to Canada at a young age and received his Canadian citizenship just two days prior to the Olympic trials. Adu-Bobie attended Sir Wilfrid Laurier Secondary School in Ottawa, Canada, where he first launched into his sprinting career.

Following the 2004 Olympics in Athens, Adu-Bobie went to the University of Florida where he placed third in the 60-yard dash at the NCAA Indoor Track and Field Championship. Unfortunately, that same spring, he injured his leg and had to miss most of the outdoor season. In 2006, Adu-Bobie transferred to Texas A&M.

Adu-Bobie has become an experienced international sprinter, competing in the NCAA Midwest Regional Championships, the Canadian Championships, the Pan Am Games and the 2005, and 2007 World Athletics Championships. He is the former Canadian junior record holder in the 100 metres.

After graduating from Texas A&M University in College Station, Texas, he returned to Ottawa, where he currently resides.

== Personal bests ==
| Eventscac | Time (seconds) | Venue | Date |
|---|---|---|---|
| 55 meters | 6.19 | Gainesville, Florida, United States | 3 March 2005 |
| 60 meters | 6.66 | Fayetteville, Arkansas, United States | 12 March 2005 |
| 100 meters | 10.25 | Lincoln, Nebraska, United States | 31 May 2008 |
| 200 meters | 20.92 | Windsor, Ontario, Canada | July 2008 |

- All information from IAAF Profile.
