= Sandro Viana =

Brazilian sprinter (born 1977)

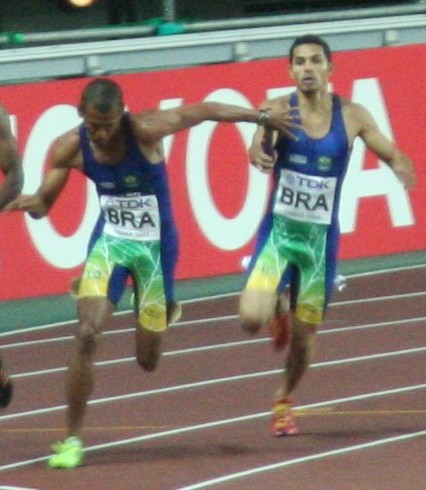
- Sandro Viana (left) at the 2007 World Championships

Personal information
- Born: March 26, 1977 (age 49)

Sport
- Country: Brazil
- Sport: Athletics
- Event: 4 × 100 m relay
Medal record
Men's athletics
Representing Brazil
Olympic Games
Bronze medal – third place	2008 Beijing	4 × 100 m relay

Sandro Ricardo Rodrigues Viana (born March 26, 1977, in Manaus) is a track and field sprint athlete who competes internationally for Brazil.

Viana represented Brazil at the 2008 Summer Olympics in Beijing. He competed at the 100 metres sprint and placed 6th in his heat without advancing to the second round. He ran the distance in a time of 10.60 seconds. Together with José Carlos Moreira, Vicente de Lima and Bruno de Barros he also competed at the 4 × 100 metres relay. In their qualification heat they placed fourth behind Trinidad and Tobago, Japan and the Netherlands. Their time of 39.01 was the seventh out of sixteen participating nations in the first round and they qualified for the final. There they sprinted to a time of 38.24 seconds, the fourth time after the Jamaican, Trinidad and Japanese teams. He also took part in the 200 metres individual, finishing fourth in his first round heat, with a time of 20.84 seconds. With 21.07 seconds in the second round he only placed seventh in his heat, which was not enough to qualify for the semi-finals.

At the 2012 Summer Olympics, he again competed in the 200 metres and the men's 4 × 100 m relay. He did not reach beyond the heats in the 200 m and the Brazilian men's 4 × 100 m team missed out on the final by 0.06 of a second.

Viana would retroactively be awarded the bronze medal for the 4 × 100 metres relay at the 2008 Summer Olympics following the demotion in 2017 of the Jamaican team for Nesta Carter's failed anti-doping test.

== Competition record ==
Year	Competition	Venue	Position	Event	Notes
2005	Universiade	İzmir, Turkey	3rd	100 m	10.49
2005	Universiade	İzmir, Turkey	8th	200 m	21.43
2005	Universiade	İzmir, Turkey	12th (h)	4 × 100 m relay	41.01
2007	South American Championships	São Paulo, Brazil	1st	200 m	20.54
2007	South American Championships	São Paulo, Brazil	1st	4 × 100 m relay	38.77
2007	Pan American Games	Rio de Janeiro, Brazil	7th (sf)	200 m	20.82
2007	Pan American Games	Rio de Janeiro, Brazil	1st	4 × 100 m relay	38.81
2007	World Championships	Osaka, Japan	35th (h)	100 m	10.46
2007	World Championships	Osaka, Japan	18th (qf)	200 m	20.68
2007	World Championships	Osaka, Japan	4th	4 × 100 m relay	37.99
2008	Ibero-American Championships	Iquique, Chile	1st	200 m	20.87
2008	Ibero-American Championships	Iquique, Chile	1st	4 × 100 m relay	38.96
2008	Olympic Games	Beijing, China	50th (h)	100 m	10.60
2008	Olympic Games	Beijing, China	30th (qf)	200 m	21.07
2008	Olympic Games	Beijing, China	3rd	4 × 100 m relay	38.24
2009	Ibero-American Championships	Berlin, Germany	38th (h)	200 m	21.18
2009	Ibero-American Championships	Berlin, Germany	7th	4 × 100 m relay	38.56
2010	Ibero-American Championships	San Fernando, Spain	8th (h)	100 m	10.55
2011	South American Championships	Buenos Aires, Argentina	3rd	100 m	10.44
2011	South American Championships	Buenos Aires, Argentina	1st	4 × 100 m relay	39.87
2011	Pan American Games	Guadalajara, Mexico	12th (sf)	100 m	10.49
2011	Pan American Games	Guadalajara, Mexico	7th	200 m	20.94
2011	Pan American Games	Guadalajara, Mexico	1st	4 × 100 m relay	38.18
2012	Ibero-American Championships	Barquisimeto, Venezuela	2nd	100 m	10.42
2012	Ibero-American Championships	Barquisimeto, Venezuela	3rd	200 m	20.69
2012	Ibero-American Championships	Barquisimeto, Venezuela	1st	4 × 100 m relay	38.95
2012	Olympic Games	London, United Kingdom	43rd (sf)	200 m	21.05
2012	Olympic Games	London, United Kingdom	10th (h)	4 × 100 m relay	38.35
