= Louis Tristán =

Peruvian long jumper

Personal information
- Born: 1 May 1984 (age 42) Lima, Peru

Sport
- Sport: Track and field
Medal record
Representing Peru
South American Games
Silver medal – second place	2006 Buenos Aires	Long jump

Louis Tristán (born 1 May 1984) is a Peruvian long jumper. His personal best jump is 8.09 metres, achieved in October 2006 in Tunja.

He competed at the 2004 World Indoor Championships, the 2006 World Indoor Championships, the 2007 World Championships and the 2008 Olympic Games without reaching the final.

== Achievements ==
Year	Competition	Venue	Position	Event	Notes
Representing Peru
2003	South American Championships	Barquisimeto, Venezuela	9th	Long jump	6.78 m
2004	World Indoor Championships	Budapest, Hungary	23rd (h)	200 m	22.78
2005	South American Championships	Cali, Colombia	4th	Long jump	7.70 m
2006	World Indoor Championships	Moscow, Russia	15th (q)	Long jump	7.35 m (iNR)
2006	South American Championships	Tunja, Colombia	2nd	Long jump	8.09 m
2006	South American U23 Championships / South American Games	Buenos Aires, Argentina	2nd	Long jump	7.59 m (wind: +2.7 m/s) w
2007	Pan American Games	Rio de Janeiro, Brazil	9th	Long jump	7.53 m
2007	World Championships	Osaka, Japan	29th (q)	Long jump	7.51 m
2008	Ibero-American Championships	Iquique, Chile	3rd	Long jump	7.58 m
2008	Olympic Games	Beijing, China	32nd (q)	Long jump	7.62 m
