= Rogério Bispo =

Brazilian long jumper (born 1985)

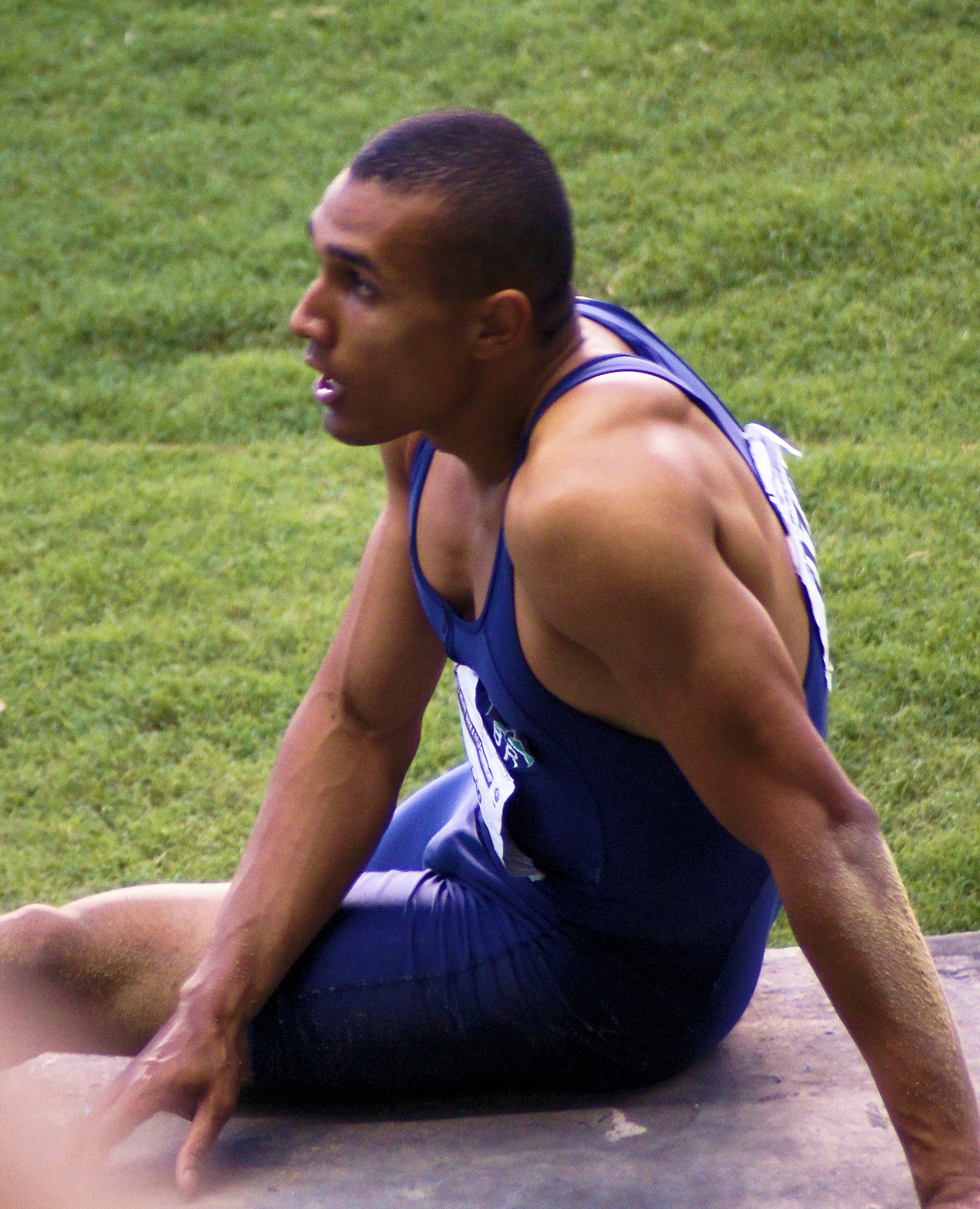
- Bispo at the 2011 Military World Games

Personal information
- Born: 16 November 1985 (age 40) Juquia, Brazil
- Height: 180 cm (5 ft 11 in)
- Weight: 75 kg (165 lb)

Sport
- Sport: Athletics
- Event: Long jump
- Coached by: Tânia Moura

Achievements and titles
- Personal best: 8.21 m (2006)
Medal record
Lusophony Games
Representing Brazil
Gold medal – first place	2006 Lusophony Games	7.79 m
Bronze medal – third place	2009 Lusophony Games	7.78 m

Rogério da Silva Bispo (born 16 November 1985) is a Brazilian long jumper. He finished eleventh at the 2004 World Junior Championships and at the 2007 Pan American Games. He also competed at the 2006 World Indoor Championships and the 2007 World Championships without reaching the final.

== Achievements ==
Year	Competition	Venue	Position	Notes
Representing Brazil
2004	World Junior Championships	Grosseto, Italy	11th	7.34 m (wind: +0.2 m/s)
2004	South American U23 Championships	Barquisimeto, Venezuela	2nd	7.69 m (wind: +1.8 m/s)
2006	World Indoor Championships	Moscow, Russia	17th (q)	7.19 m
2006	Ibero-American Championships	Ponce, Puerto Rico	4th	7.66 m
2006	South American Championships	Tunja, Colombia	1st	8.32 m (w)
2006	Lusophony Games	Macau	1st	7.79 m
2007	South American Championships	São Paulo, Brazil	1st	7.94 m
2007	World Championships	Osaka, Japan	23rd (q)	7.74 m
2008	World Indoor Championships	Valencia, Spain	11th (q)	7.77 m
2009	South American Championships	Lima, Peru	1st	7.77 m
2009	Lusophony Games	Lisbon, Portugal	3rd	7.78 m (w)
2011	South American Championships	Buenos Aires, Argentina	5th	7.71 m
2011	Pan American Games	Guadalajara, Mexico	13th (q)	7.51 m
2012	Ibero-American Championships	Barquisimeto, Venezuela	3rd	7.67 m
