= Ruslan Gataullin =

Russian long jumper (born 1979)

Ruslan Gataullin (Russian: Русла́н Гатау́ллин; born 1 December 1979) is a Russian long jumper. His personal best jump is 8.29 metres, achieved in May 2007 in Sochi. Early in his career he was also a pole vaulter achieving a personal best vault of 5.60m before focusing solely on the long jump.

He finished seventh at the 2006 European Athletics Championships and at the 2006 IAAF World Cup. He also competed at the 2006 World Indoor Championships and the 2007 World Championships without reaching the final.

An ethnic Tatar from Tashkent, Uzbekistan, he is the younger brother of pole vaulter Rodion Gataullin.

== International competitions ==
Representing Russia
Year	Competition	Venue	Position	Event	Notes
2006	European Championships	Gothenburg, Sweden	7th	Long jump	7.91 m
