= Athletics at the 2009 Lusofonia Games =

Athletics at the II Lusophone Games
- Dates: 12,13,19 July 2009
- Host city: Lisbon, Portugal
- Venue: Estádio Universitário de Lisboa
- Events: 31
- Participation: 181 athletes from 12 nations

The Athletics competition at the 2009 Lusophone Games was held in the Estádio Universitário de Lisboa on 12,13 and 19 July 2009.

Brazilian medalists Jorge Sena, Bruno Barros, Lucimar Teodoro, Luciana França, Lucimara da Silva, Fernanda Gonçalves, Josiane Tito were all later disqualified from their events as they failed their drug tests after systematic doping by their coach. Triple jump fourth placer Leonardo dos Santos was also disqualified. It is not clear whether medals were reassigned to other athletes.

== Medals summary ==
=== Men's ===
Event	Gold		Silver		Bronze	
100 m	(Portugal) Francis Obikwelu	10.18	(Brazil) José Carlos Moreira	10.33	(Brazil) Jorge Celio Sena	10.35 (DQ)
200 m	(Portugal) Arnaldo Abrantes	20.64 w	(Brazil) Bruno de Barros	20.78 w (DQ)	(Brazil) Hugo Sousa	20.90 w
400 m	(Brazil) Eduardo Vasconcelos	46.32	(Portugal) João Pedro Ferreira	47.00	(Brazil) Luis Ambrosio	47.14
800 m	(Brazil) Lutimar Paes	1:48.89	(Portugal) Rui Silva	1:49.03	(Portugal) Renato Silva	1:49.68
1500 m	(Sri Lanka) Chaminda Wijekoon	3:48.15	(Portugal) Hélio Gomes	3:48.91	(Brazil) Hudson de Souza	3:49.26
5000 m	(Portugal) Manuel Damião	14:34.69	(Portugal) Eduardo Mbengani	14:35.76	(Brazil) Ubiratan Santos	14:51.73
10 km (road)	(Portugal) Rui Pedro Silva	30:14	(Brazil) Daniel Silva	30:30	(Portugal) Ricardo Ribas	30:46
110 m hurdles	(Brazil) Anselmo da Silva	13.97	(Portugal) Luís Sá	14.22	(Portugal) Rasul Dabó	14.35
400 m hurdles	(Brazil) Raphael Fernandes	50.61	(Brazil) João Santos Neto	51.09	(Mozambique) Kurt Couto	51.10
3000 m s'chase	(Portugal) Alberto Paulo	8:38.48	(Portugal) Pedro Ribeiro	8:39.90	(Brazil) Fernando Fernandes	9:32.90
High jump	(Brazil) Guilherme Cobbo	2.16	(Portugal) Paulo Gonçalves	2.12	(Angola) Ulika Bravo da Costa	2.06
Long jump	(Portugal) Marcos Chuva	8.09 w	(Portugal) Marcos Caldeira	7.83 w	(Brazil) Rogério Bispo	7.78 w
Triple jump	(Portugal) Nelson Évora	17.15	(Brazil) Jefferson Sabino	16.84	(Portugal) Marcos Caldeira	16.41 w
Shot put	(Portugal) Marco Fortes	19.74	(Brazil) Gustavo Mendonça	17.89	(Brazil) Ronald Julião	17.63
4 × 100 m	Brazil; Vicente de Lima; José Carlos Moreira; Jorge Célio Sena; Bruno de Barros	39.30 (DQ?)	Portugal; Dany Gonçalves; Arnaldo Abrantes; Edi Sousa; Francis Obikwelu	39.31	Sri Lanka; Mohamed Safran; Ashan Ranasinghe; Jeewan Warnakulasuriya; Shehan Ambepitiya	40.58
4 × 400 m	Brazil; Luis Eduardo Ambrósio; Wallace Vieira; Rodrigo Bargas; Eduardo Vasconcelos	3:07.76	Portugal; Filipe Santos; António Rodrigues; Bruno Gualberto; João Ferreira	3:13.10	Sri Lanka; Mohamed Safran; Ashan Ranasinghe; Jeewan Warnakulasuriya; Shehan Ambepitiya	3:21.70
WR world record | AR area record | CR championship record | GR games record | NR national record | OR Olympic record | PB personal best | SB season best | WL world leading (in a given season)

=== Women's ===
Event	Gold		Silver		Bronze	
100 m	(Brazil) Lucimar de Moura	11.30	(Portugal) Sónia Tavares	11.39	(Portugal) Carla Tavares	11.52
200 m	(Portugal) Sónia Tavares	23.64 w	(Brazil) Evelyn Santos	23.79 w	(Brazil) Vanda Gomes	23.91 w
400 m	(Brazil) Jailma de Lima	52.63	(Brazil) Emmily Pinheiro	53.29	(Sri Lanka) Chandrika Mudiyanselage	53.41
800 m	(Portugal) Sandra Teixeira	2:06.42	(Brazil) Christiane dos Santos	2:07.14	(Brazil) Josiane Tito	2:07.15 (DQ)
1500 m	(Portugal) Jéssica Augusto	4:15.86	(Brazil) Sabine Heitling	4:17.68	(Brazil) Christiane dos Santos	4:21.45
5000 m	(Portugal) Sara Moreira	15:45.05	(Portugal) Leonor Carneiro	16:15.40	(Brazil) Fabiana Silva	16:21.79
10 km (road)	(Portugal) Fernanda Ribeiro	32:49	(Portugal) Marisa Barros	33:14	(Brazil) Adriana Aparecida da Silva	35:36
100 m hurdles	(Brazil) Fabiana Morães	13.32	(Portugal) Mónica Lopes	13.66	(Brazil) Gisele Albuquerque	13.73
400 m hurdles	(Brazil) Lucimar Teodoro	56.69 (DQ)	(Portugal) Patricia Lopes	57.05	(Brazil) Luciana França	58.52 (DQ)
High jump	(Brazil) Lucimara Silva	1.81m (DQ)	(Brazil) Mónica Freitas	1.78m	(Portugal) Marisa Anselmo	1.74m
Long jump	(Portugal) Naide Gomes	6.74m w	(Brazil) Keila Costa	6.71m w	(Brazil) Fernanda Gonçalves	6.20m (DQ)
Triple jump	(Portugal) Patrícia Mamona	13.79m	(Brazil) Fernanda Gonçalves	13.41m (DQ)	(Brazil) Tânia Silva	13.23m
Shot put	(Brazil) Elisângela Adriano	17.02m	(Brazil) Andrea Britto	16.26m	(Portugal) Maria Antónia Borges	15.24m
4 × 100 m	Brazil; Rosemar Coelho Neto; Lucimar de Moura; Thaissa Presti; Evelyn dos Santos	44.08	Portugal; Andreia Felisberto; Tânia Duarte; Carla Tavares; Sónia Tavares	45.05	–	-
4 × 400 m	Brazil; Geisa Coutinho; Emmily Pinheiro; Sheila Ferreira; Jailma de Lima	3:34.16	Portugal; Vera Barbosa; Patrícia Lopes; Joceline Monteiro; Maria Carmo Tavares	3:37.90	São Tomé and Príncipe; Glória Santo; Lecabela Quaresma; Celma Bonfim; Ludmila Leal	4:06.14
WR world record | AR area record | CR championship record | GR games record | NR national record | OR Olympic record | PB personal best | SB season best | WL world leading (in a given season)

== Medal table ==
=== Original ===
Rank	Nation	Gold	Silver	Bronze	Total
1	Portugal	15	17	7	39
2	Brazil	15	14	17	46
3	Sri Lanka	1	0	3	4
4	Angola	0	0	1	1
4	Mozambique	0	0	1	1
4	São Tomé and Príncipe	0	0	1	1
Totals (6 entries)		31	31	30	92

=== After disqualifications ===
Rank	Nation	Gold	Silver	Bronze	Total
1	Portugal	17	17	8	42
2	Brazil	13	13	11	37
3	Sri Lanka	1	1	3	5
4	Guinea-Bissau	0	0	3	3
5	Mozambique	0	0	2	2
5	São Tomé and Príncipe	0	0	2	2
7	Angola	0	0	1	1
Totals (7 entries)		31	31	30	92

== Participation ==
- Angola (5)
- Brazil (54)
- Cape Verde (23)
- Equatorial Guinea (5)
- Guinea-Bissau (6)
- India (2)
- Macau (6)
- Mozambique (2)
- Portugal (55)
- São Tomé and Príncipe (9)
- Sri Lanka (9)
- Timor-Leste (5)
