= Jared Connaughton =

Canadian sprinter (born 1985)

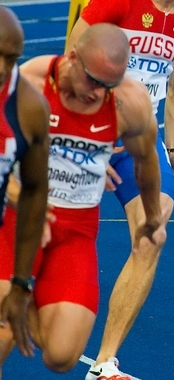
- Connaughton in 2009

Personal information
- Born: July 20, 1985 (age 40) Charlottetown, Prince Edward Island, Canada
- Height: 1.74 m (5 ft 9 in)
- Weight: 80 kg (176 lb; 12 st 8 lb)

Sport
- Sport: Running
- Event(s): 50 metres, 60 metres, 100 metres, 150 metres, 200 metres
- Club: Islanders Track and Field Club
Medal record
Representing Canada
Pan American Games
Silver medal – second place	2007 Rio de Janeiro	4x100m relay

Jared Neal Connaughton (born July 20, 1985) is a Canadian former track athlete who specialized in the 100m and 200m. He is now a physical education cross country, and track and field coach at Fort Worth Country Day in Fort Worth, Texas.

== Biography ==
Connaughton was born in Charlottetown, Prince Edward Island, Canada. He is the son of Susan and Neal Connaughton. He attended Bluefield High School and graduated in the spring of 2003. Jared received a B.A from the University of Texas-Arlington in 2008. He is married to fellow University of Texas-Arlington athlete, Tamesha (nee Graves). They were wed in December 2011. The couple have two children, Morgan 9 and Louis 7.

Junior career

Jared is a four time medalist at the Canadian Legion Championships (1 Gold, 3 Silver), he also won two silver medals at the 2002 Canadian Junior championships in Kitchener, Ontario.

Jared participated in youth soccer for the Elliot River club and hockey for the North River Hockey Association.

=== College career ===
Connaughton attended The University of Texas at Arlington, which at the time was part of the Southland Conference. He was named the 2006 Southland Conference Track and Field athlete of the year both indoors and outdoors. In the 60 m semifinal at the Southland Conference indoor championships, he set a new meet and conference record of 6.68 seconds. In the final, he stumbled badly and was defeated by Ravyn Hayward of Northwestern State University 6.80 seconds to 6.85 seconds. Later in the 200 m final, Connaughton set a new championship meet record with a time of 21.57 seconds at the 200 meter flat track at the University of Houston, breaking the previous record set by JD Henry of Northwestern State in 2005 with a time of 21.64 seconds. Connaughton later went on to compete in the 60 m dash at the NCAA indoor championship meet at the University of Arkansas and finished with a time of 6.78 seconds.

In the 2006 outdoor season, Connaughton ran a time of 20.59 (2.1w) seconds at the Arlington Invitational. He then ran a season and personal best of 10.28 (1.7w) seconds at the Texas Christian University Invitational in early May. He finished 3rd in the 200 m at the Drake Relays with a time of 21.10 into a headwind of 1.1 m/s behind World and Olympic Champion Jeremy Wariner and Jamaican Ricardo Williams. Connaughton won both the 100 m and 200 m at the Southland Conference championships with times of 10.33 seconds and 20.90 seconds, and was named outstanding athlete of the year in the Southland Conference. Later at the NCAA Mid-West Regional Championships, Connaughton ran to a new personal best in the 200 m with a time of 20.70 seconds (1.9w). In the final, he finished 3rd with a wind aided time of 20.67 seconds behind Churandy Martina of UTEP and Carey Lacour of the University of Houston. He competed at the NCAA Championships in Sacramento, California, and ran a time of 21.27 seconds (−1.7w). Jared was his team's high point scorer (20) at the 2007 Southland Conference Championship, leading his team to a team title, the school's first outdoor championships since the 1997 season. In 2013, Jared was named as one of the 50 greatest Southland Conference track and field athletes.

=== International career ===
Connaughton was victorious in both the 100 m and 200 m events at the 2005 Canada Summer Games in August 2005. The Canada Games were hosted by Regina, Saskatchewan. He was the first Prince Edward Island native to win two gold medals at one set of Canada Games and the first gold medalist since 1969.

Connaughton competed for the Team Canada at the 2006 NACAC U-23 championships in Santo Domingo, Dominican Republic. He finished 8th in the 100 m and in the bronze medal spot in the 200 m. After suffering a lower abdominal strain, he went on to finish 2nd at the Canadian Championship meet hosted by Ottawa. He ran to a time of 21.07 in the semifinal and 21.16 seconds in the final behind Bryan Barnett of Edmonton, who ran to a personal best of 20.70 seconds.

Connaughton is the 2008 Canadian National Champion in the 200 m sprint with a championship record and personal best time of 20.34 (+0.4 m/s) seconds. He achieved this on July 6, 2008, in Windsor, Ontario. The previous championship record was 20.40 seconds run by Atlee Mahorn in 1986.

At the 2008 Beijing Olympics, Connaughton competed in the 200 m and 4 × 100 m relay for Canada. His team placed 6th in the relay finals, and Connaughton placed 14th in the 200 m semifinal competition.

At the 2009 Canadian Championships in Toronto, Ontario Jared won a bronze medal in the 100m and a silver in the 200m. Later that season he went on to represent Canada at the IAAF World Championships in Berlin, Germany competing in the 200m and as a member of the 4x100m relay team. That team finished 5th in the final, the best global placing the National Relay team had achieved since the 1997 IAAF World Championships.

In the 2010 season, Jared finished in silver medal position in the 100m at the Canadian Championships, behind champion Sam Effah, of Calgary, Alberta. Later, he won the gold in the 200m, running 20.66 seconds, setting the Varsity stadium record in the process. Later that season Jared competed for team Canada at the Commonwealth Games in New Delhi, India finishing in 4th place in the 200m. He also competed as a member of the 4x100m relay team.

In the 2011 season, Jared won the International Invitational at the Texas Relays, hosted by the University of Texas-Austin. His time of 10.04 (3.4w) was at the time the fastest in the world under any conditions. Jared would go on to win two silver medals in the 100m and 200m respectively at the Canadian Championships, hosted in Calgary, Alberta. He was named to his third IAAF world championship team, where he competed in the 200m and 4x100m relay.

In the 2012 season, Jared opened his outdoor season in the 200m event with a 20.54 second (March 28 in Arlington, Texas). He followed that performance with a life time best, running 20.30 (0.3) on May 9 in Fortaleza, Brazil. He captured a bronze medal in the 200m at the Canadian Championships, hosted in Moncton, New Brunswick. On July 14, Jared ran 10.19 (1.0) at the Ontario Track and Field Championships, in Ottawa, Ontario, his second fastest wind legal 100m performance of his career.

At the 2012 London Olympics, Connaughton again competed in the 200 m and 4 × 100 m relay for Canada. His team crossed the finish line 3rd in the 4 × 100 final, but they lost the bronze medal five minutes later when they were disqualified due to a lane violation committed by Connaughton. In the 200 m semifinal competition, Connaughton placed 11th.

In 2013, Jared progress was hampered by a nagging achilles tendon injury which side-lined him for the early part of the outdoor season. However, he went on to win a silver medal in the 200m at the Canadian Championships in Moncton, New Brunswick. An other injury prevented him from competing at his fourth IAAF World Championships in Moscow, Russia. At the 2013 Francophone Games in Nice, France, Jared would go on to finish fourth in the 100m final and win Gold as member of the 4x100m relay team.

In 2014, injuries hampered his season, where he'd withdraw from the 200m final at the Canadian Championships, which marked the first time in his illustrious career where he'd fail to win a medal at the National Championships (dating back to the 2006 Canadian Championships). He'd go on to compete at his second Commonwealth Games in Glasgow, Scotland where he wouldn't advance past the first round of the 100m.

On August 29, 2014, Connaughton officially announced his retirement from the sport. He won a total of 19 medals at a variety of Canadian championships throughout his career including four juvenile (Legion), two junior, two Canada Games and 11 at the senior national championships.

Best times
Event	Seconds time	Month	Day	Year	Venue
55m	6.23	January	15	2009	University of Houston
60m	6.64	February	8	2009	Gent, Belgium
100m	10.15(+1.8)	May	3	2008	University of Texas at Arlington
200m	20.30 (+0.3)	May	9	2012	Fortaleza, Brazil
4 × 100 m Relay	38.05	August	10	2012	London, England - Olympics

=== Post-retirement ===
Connaughton now is an athletics coach at Fort Worth Country Day School, coaching cross country and track and field. Through his work there, he has led the boys track and field team to their first SPC (Southwest Preparatory Conference) Championship Team titles in over 40 years. The first title was earned in 2023 and again in 2025. The girls team won back-to-back conference titles in 2023 & 2024.
