= Bashir Ramzy =

American long jumper

Personal information
- Born: 4 May 1979 (age 47) Las Cruces, New Mexico, United States

Sport
- Sport: Track and field
- Club: Texas A&M Aggies
Medal record
Representing United States
Pan American Games
Bronze medal – third place	2007 Rio de Janeiro	Long jump

Bashir Ramzy (born 4 May 1979) is a male American long jumper and competes in the 110 metre hurdles.

He won the bronze medal at the 2007 Pan American Games. He also competed at the 2006 World Indoor Championships without reaching the final. His personal best jump is 8.18 meters, achieved in April 2009 in Chula Vista.

Bashir was inducted into the Texas A&M Hall of Fame 19 September 2009. He currently coaches at the Chula Vista Elite Athlete Center.
