= Jimmie Hackley =

American sprinter

Personal information
- Born: September 11, 1975 (age 50)

Sport
- Country: United States
- Sport: Track and field
- Events: 100 metres; 200 metres; 400 metres

Jimmie Hackley (born September 11, 1975) is an American sprinter who specializes in the 200 metres.

Hackley competed for the Florida Gators track and field and South Carolina Gamecocks track and field teams in the NCAA.

He finished fifth at the 2004 World Indoor Championships. He became US Indoor champion in 2004.

His personal best times were 20.31 seconds in the 200 meters, achieved in April 2004 in Fort-de-France; 10.33 seconds in the 100 meters, achieved in May 2004 in Kingston, Jamaica and in April 2005 in Tallahassee; and 45.17 seconds in the 400 meters, achieved in April 1998 in Gainesville.
