= 2021 South American Championships in Athletics – Results =

These are the results of the 2021 South American Championships in Athletics which took place in Guayaquil, Ecuador, from 29 to 31 May at the Estadio Modelo Alberto Spencer Herrera.

== Men's results ==
=== 100 meters ===
Heats – 29 May
Wind:
Heat 1: +1.0 m/s, Heat 2: +1.7 m/s

Rank	Heat	Name	Nationality	Time	Notes
1	2	Felipe Bardi	Brazil	10.15	Q
2	2	Emanuel Archibald	Guyana	10.25	Q
3	1	Derick Silva	Brazil	10.38	Q
4	2	Franco Florio	Argentina	10.50	Q
5	2	Enrique Polanco	Chile	10.52	q
6	2	John Paredes	Colombia	10.58	q
7	1	Jhonny Rentería	Colombia	10.59	Q
8	2	Anderson Marquinez	Ecuador	10.60	
9	1	Agustín Pinti	Argentina	10.70	Q
10	1	Bruno Rojas	Bolivia	10.71	
11	1	Nilo Duré	Paraguay	10.76	
12	1	Jeremy Bascom	Guyana	10.77	
13	2	Julian Vargas	Bolivia	10.83	
14	1	Steeven Salas	Ecuador	10.98	

Final – 29 May
Wind:
+2.3 m/s

Rank	Lane	Name	Nationality	Time	Notes
1st place, gold medalist(s)	4	Felipe Bardi	Brazil	10.10	
2nd place, silver medalist(s)	5	Emanuel Archibald	Guyana	10.23	
3rd place, bronze medalist(s)	3	Derick Silva	Brazil	10.35	
4	2	Agustín Pinti	Argentina	10.49	
5	6	Franco Florio	Argentina	10.49	
6	7	Enrique Polanco	Chile	10.49	
7	1	Jhonny Rentería	Colombia	10.50	
8	8	John Paredes	Colombia	10.62	

Extra – 29 May
Wind: 0.0 m/s

Rank	Lane	Name	Nationality	Time	Notes
1	5	Bruno de Barros	Brazil	10.40	
2	3	Erik Cardoso	Brazil	10.64	
3	2	Jesús Mina	Ecuador	11.06	
	4	Nicolás Salinas	Colombia	DNS	

=== 200 meters ===
Heats – 31 May
Wind:
Heat 1: +1.8 m/s, Heat 2: +0.7 m/s

Rank	Heat	Name	Nationality	Time	Notes
1	1	Felipe Bardi	Brazil	20.70	Q
2	1	Anderson Marquinez	Ecuador	20.93	Q
3	1	Agustín Pinti	Argentina	21.08	Q
4	1	Kelvis Padrino	Venezuela	21.15	q
5	1	Akeem Stuart	Guyana	21.18	q
6	2	Lucas Vilar	Brazil	21.20	Q
7	1	Carlos Palacios	Colombia	21.22	
8	2	Katriel Angulo	Ecuador	21.57	Q
9	2	Franco Camiolo	Argentina	21.61	Q
10	1	Julián Vargas	Bolivia	21.66	
11	2	Bruno Rojas	Bolivia	21.72	
12	2	Arinze Chance	Guyana	21.84	
13	2	Nicolás Salinas	Colombia	22.20	

Final – 31 May
Wind:
+1.9 m/s

Rank	Lane	Name	Nationality	Time	Notes
1st place, gold medalist(s)	3	Felipe Bardi	Brazil	20.49	
2nd place, silver medalist(s)	5	Lucas Vilar	Brazil	20.62	
3rd place, bronze medalist(s)	4	Anderson Marquinez	Ecuador	20.63	
4	7	Agustín Pinti	Argentina	20.93	
5	1	Kelvis Padrino	Venezuela	21.03	PB
6	8	Franco Camiolo	Argentina	21.32	
7	6	Katriel Angulo	Ecuador	21.74	
	2	Akeem Stuart	Guyana	DQ	

=== 400 meters ===
Heats – 29 May

Rank	Heat	Name	Nationality	Time	Notes
1	1	Lucas Carvalho	Brazil	46.40	Q
2	2	Kelvis Padrino	Venezuela	46.72	Q
3	1	Raúl Mena	Colombia	47.32	Q
4	2	Arinze Chance	Guyana	47.48	Q
5	2	Carlos Lemos	Colombia	47.76	Q
6	1	Elián Larregina	Argentina	47.84	Q
7	2	João Henrique Cabral	Brazil	48.01	q
8	1	Antonio Grant	Panama	48.27	q
9	1	Alan Minda	Ecuador	48.35	
10	2	Leandro Paris	Argentina	48.39	
11	2	Anderson Colorado	Ecuador	49.89	

Final – 29 May

Rank	Lane	Name	Nationality	Time	Notes
1st place, gold medalist(s)	5	Kelvis Padrino	Venezuela	45.82	
2nd place, silver medalist(s)	4	Lucas Carvalho	Brazil	46.31	
3rd place, bronze medalist(s)	3	Raúl Mena	Colombia	46.58	
4	6	Arinze Chance	Guyana	46.81	
5	2	João Henrique Cabral	Brazil	47.86	
6	1	Antonio Grant	Panama	48.05	
7	8	Elián Larregina	Argentina	48.06	
	7	Carlos Lemos	Colombia	DNS	

Extra – 29 May

Rank	Lane	Name	Nationality	Time	Notes
1	?	Pedro Luiz de Oliveira	Brazil	46.88	
2	?	Edison Acuña	Ecuador	48.70	
3	?	Miguel Maldonado	Ecuador	49.00	

=== 800 meters ===
Heats – 30 May

Rank	Heat	Name	Nationality	Time	Notes
1	1	Thiago André	Brazil	1:48.30	Q
2	1	Jhonatan Rodríguez	Colombia	1:48.36	Q, NU20R
3	1	Quamel Prince	Guyana	1:49.10	Q
4	2	Eduardo Moreira	Brazil	1:50.18	Q
5	2	Jelssin Robledo	Colombia	1:50.34	Q
6	2	Ryan López	Venezuela	1:50.45	Q
7	1	Diego Lacamoire	Argentina	1:50.67	q
8	2	Julian Gaviola	Argentina	1.50.80	q
9	2	Devaun Barrington	Guyana	1:50.99	
10	1	Chesman Tacuri	Ecuador	1:53.21	
11	2	Andy Cedeño	Ecuador	1:53.78	
12	1	Gerardo Martino	Uruguay	1:54.25	

Final – 31 May

Rank	Name	Nationality	Time	Notes
1st place, gold medalist(s)	Thiago André	Brazil	1:45.62	CR
2nd place, silver medalist(s)	Jhonatan Rodríguez	Colombia	1:47.01	NU20R
3rd place, bronze medalist(s)	Ryan López	Venezuela	1:47.78	
4	Jelssin Robledo	Colombia	1:48.31	
5	Quamel Prince	Guyana	1:49.48	
6	Eduardo Moreira	Brazil	1:50.72	
7	Julian Gaviola	Argentina	1:53.35	
	Diego Lacamoire	Argentina	DNF	

=== 1500 meters ===
29 May

Rank	Name	Nationality	Time	Notes
1st place, gold medalist(s)	Thiago André	Brazil	3:37.92	
2nd place, silver medalist(s)	Federico Bruno	Argentina	3:38.25	
3rd place, bronze medalist(s)	Santiago Catrofe	Uruguay	3:38.67	
4	Guilherme Kurtz	Brazil	3:40.66	
5	Diego Lacamoire	Argentina	3:44.17	
6	Carlos San Martín	Colombia	3:44.44	
7	José Daniel González	Venezuela	3:46.30	
8	Alfredo Toledo	Chile	3:47.90	
9	Esteban González	Chile	3:48.78	
10	Miguel Ángel Mesa	Colombia	3:52.08	
11	Eduardo Gregorio	Uruguay	3:52.77	
12	Ryan López	Venezuela	3:53.83	
13	Gerson Montes de Oca	Ecuador	3:54.31	
14	Ferdinan Cereceda	Peru	3:54.72	
15	Julio Palomino	Peru	4:01.52	
16	Andy Cedeño	Ecuador	4:02.22	

=== 5000 meters ===
31 May

Rank	Name	Nationality	Time	Notes
1st place, gold medalist(s)	Altobeli da Silva	Brazil	13:51.81	
2nd place, silver medalist(s)	Carlos Díaz	Chile	13:52.63	
3rd place, bronze medalist(s)	Yuri Labra	Peru	13:55.84	
4	Mauricio González	Colombia	14:01.78	
5	Cristián Moreno	Colombia	14:15.76	
6	Vidal Basco	Bolivia	14:21.39	
7	Andrés Zamora	Uruguay	14:27.03	
8	Gilmar Lopes	Brazil	14:35.67	
9	David Ninavia	Bolivia	14:36.94	NU20R
10	Luis Cárdenas	Ecuador	14:45.23	
11	Luis Masabanda	Ecuador	14:51.52	
12	José Zabala	Argentina	15:14.27	
	Nicolás Cuestas	Uruguay	DNF	
	Esteban González	Chile	DNF	
	Cristian Pacheco	Peru	DNS	

=== 10,000 meters ===
29 May

Rank	Name	Nationality	Time	Notes
1st place, gold medalist(s)	Daniel do Nascimento	Brazil	29:18.06	
2nd place, silver medalist(s)	Nicolás Cuestas	Uruguay	29:38.72	
3rd place, bronze medalist(s)	Martín Cuestas	Uruguay	29:47.82	
4	Mauricio González	Colombia	30:26.46	
5	Edison Enriquez	Ecuador	30:27.89	
6	Hector Garibay	Bolivia	30:35.85	
7	Ignacio Velasquez	Chile	30:58.27	
	Nelson Ito	Peru	DNF	
	Gilmar Lopes	Brazil	DNF	
	Luis Cárdenas	Ecuador	DNF	

=== 110 meters hurdles ===
Heats – 30 May
Wind:
Heat 1: +1.5 m/s, Heat 2: +1.6 m/s

Rank	Heat	Name	Nationality	Time	Notes
1	2	Rafael Pereira	Brazil	13.49	Q
2	2	Eduardo de Deus	Brazil	13.64	Q
3	1	Yohan Chaverra	Colombia	13.75	Q
4	2	Marcos Herrera	Ecuador	13.97	Q
5	2	Renzo Cremaschi	Argentina	14.03	q
6	2	Javier McFarlane	Peru	14.13	q
7	1	Fanor Escobar	Colombia	14.14	Q
8	1	Agustín Carrera	Argentina	14.19	Q
9	1	Kevin Rodríguez	Ecuador	14.55	
	1	Martín Sáenz	Chile	DQ	

Final – 30 May
Wind:
+0.7 m/s

Rank	Lane	Name	Nationality	Time	Notes
1st place, gold medalist(s)	4	Rafael Pereira	Brazil	13.35	CR
2nd place, silver medalist(s)	3	Yohan Chaverra	Colombia	13.53	
3rd place, bronze medalist(s)	6	Marcos Herrera	Ecuador	13.77	
4	2	Fanor Escobar	Colombia	13.90	
5	1	Agustín Carrera	Argentina	14.14	
6	1	Javier McFarlane	Peru	14.19	
7	7	Renzo Cremaschi	Argentina	14.24	
	5	Eduardo de Deus	Brazil	DNF	

=== 400 meters hurdles ===
Heats – 30 May

Rank	Heat	Name	Nationality	Time	Notes
1	2	Artur Terezan	Brazil	50.97	Q
2	1	Andrés Silva	Uruguay	53.15	Q
3	2	Kevin Mina	Colombia	53.29	Q
4	2	Emerson Chala	Ecuador	53.36	Q
5	2	Ian Piero Corozo	Ecuador	53.41	q
6	2	Alfredo Sepúlveda	Chile	53.65	q
7	1	Mahau Suguimati	Brazil	53.77	Q
8	1	Guillermo Ruggeri	Argentina	54.41	Q
9	1	Juan Manuel Acuña	Uruguay	54.68	
	1	Fanor Escobar	Colombia	DNF	

Final – 31 May

Rank	Lane	Name	Nationality	Time	Notes
1st place, gold medalist(s)	5	Mahau Suguimati	Brazil	51.25	
2nd place, silver medalist(s)	6	Kevin Mina	Colombia	51.39	
3rd place, bronze medalist(s)	4	Andrés Silva	Uruguay	51.42	
4	2	Alfredo Sepúlveda	Chile	51.69	
5	7	Guillermo Ruggeri	Argentina	51.88	
6	8	Emerson Chala	Ecuador	53.10	
7	1	Ian Piero Corozo	Ecuador	54.25	
	3	Artur Terezan	Brazil	DNS	

=== 3000 meters steeplechase ===
30 May

Rank	Name	Nationality	Time	Notes
1st place, gold medalist(s)	Altobeli da Silva	Brazil	8:34.17	
2nd place, silver medalist(s)	Carlos San Martín	Colombia	8:34.32	
3rd place, bronze medalist(s)	Mario Bazán	Peru	8:36.71	
4	José Daniel González	Venezuela	8:56.70	
5	Israel Mecabo	Brazil	8:59.35	
6	Mauricio Valdivia	Chile	9:01.34	
7	Yuri Labra	Peru	9:08.74	
8	Dylan Van Der Hock	Argentina	9:10.60	
9	Jorge Arias	Ecuador	9:16.14	
10	Carlos Johnson	Argentina	9:24.94	
11	Camilo Bolivar	Colombia	9:29.78	
12	Erick Alcivar	Ecuador	10:01.40	
	José Peña	Venezuela	DNS	

=== 4 × 100 meters relay ===
31 May

Rank	Lane	Nation	Competitors	Time	Notes
1st place, gold medalist(s)	5	Brazil	Erik Cardoso, Felipe Bardi, Derick Silva, Bruno de Barros	39.10	
2nd place, silver medalist(s)	4	Colombia	Jhonny Rentería, John Paredes, Carlos Palacios, Arnovis Dalmero	39.65	
3rd place, bronze medalist(s)	3	Guyana	Jeremy Bascom, Emanuel Archibald, Akeem Stuart, Noelex Holder	40.02	
4	7	Ecuador	Katriel Angulo, Anderson Marquinez, Steeven Salas, Jesús Mina	40.78	
	6	Argentina	Franco Camiolo, Agustín Pinti, Joel dos Santos, Franco Florio	DQ	R24.7

=== 4 × 400 meters relay ===
31 May

Rank	Nation	Competitors	Time	Notes
1st place, gold medalist(s)	Brazil	Bruno de Barros, Lucas Carvalho, João Falcão Cabral, Pedro Luiz de Oliveira	3:04.25	
2nd place, silver medalist(s)	Colombia	Kevin Mina, Raúl Mena, Nicolás Salinas, Fanor Escobar	3:08.15	
3rd place, bronze medalist(s)	Ecuador	Edison Acuña, Alan Minda, Miguel Maldonado, Anderson Marquinez	3:13.74	
	Argentina		DNS	

=== 20,000 meters walk ===
30 May

Rank	Name	Nationality	Time	Notes
1st place, gold medalist(s)	Andrés Chocho	Ecuador	1:24:18.94	
2nd place, silver medalist(s)	Jhon Castañeda	Colombia	1:24:32.06	
3rd place, bronze medalist(s)	Jhonatan Amores	Ecuador	1:24:49.13	
4	Juan Manuel Cano	Argentina	1:25:48.03	
5	Lucas Mazzo	Brazil	1:28:26.92	
	Gonzalo Buestas*	Ecuador	1:28:40.85	
6	Yassir Cabrera	Panama	1:30:17.52	NR
7	Diego Lima	Brazil	1:33:17.17	

=== High jump ===
29 May

Rank	Name	Nationality	Result	Notes
1st place, gold medalist(s)	Fernando Ferreira	Brazil	2.29	
2nd place, silver medalist(s)	Thiago Moura	Brazil	2.23	
3rd place, bronze medalist(s)	Carlos Layoy	Argentina	2.17	
4	Eure Yáñez	Venezuela	2.17	
5	Arturo Chávez	Peru	2.17	
6	Mark Jhalu	Guyana	2.11	
7	Gilmar Correa	Colombia	2.11	
7	Tomas Ferrari	Argentina	2.11	
9	Justin Herrera	Ecuador	2.05	
	Brayan Robledo	Colombia	NM	

=== Pole vault ===
30 May

Rank	Name	Nationality	4.70	4.80	4.90	5.00	5.10	5.20	5.30	5.35	5.40	5.55	Result	Notes
1st place, gold medalist(s)	Germán Chiaraviglio	Argentina	–	–	–	–	–	–	–	xo	–	xxo	xx	5.55
2nd place, silver medalist(s)	Dyander Pacho	Ecuador	–	o	–	o	–	xo	xo	xx–	x			5.30
3rd place, bronze medalist(s)	Abel Curtinove	Brazil	–	–	–	o	–	o	xxx					5.20
4	Bruno Spinelli	Brazil	–	–	–	–	xxo	xo	xx–	x				5.20
5	Walter Viáfara	Colombia	–	–	–	o	–	xxx						5.00
6	Guillermo Correa	Chile	xo	–	xo	xxo	xxx							5.00
	Pablo Zaffaroni	Argentina	–	xxx										NM

=== Long jump ===
29 May

Rank	Name	Nationality	Result	Notes
1st place, gold medalist(s)	Arnovis Dalmero	Colombia	7.94	
2nd place, silver medalist(s)	Emiliano Lasa	Uruguay	7.94	
3rd place, bronze medalist(s)	Alexsandro Melo	Brazil	7.93	
4	Samory Fraga	Brazil	7.93	
5	José Luis Mandros	Peru	7.86	
6	Leodan Torrealba	Venezuela	7.82	
7	Emanuel Archibald	Guyana	7.75	
8	Daniel Pineda	Chile	7.62w	
9	Micaiah Washington	Guyana	7.34	
10	Adrian Alvarado	Panama	7.26	
11	Joel dos Santos	Argentina	7.21	
12	Marco Ponce	Ecuador	6.62	
13	Frixon Chila	Ecuador	6.61w	

=== Triple jump ===
30 May

Rank	Name	Nationality	#1	#2	#3	#4	#5	#6	Result	Notes
1st place, gold medalist(s)	Alexsandro Melo	Brazil	16.21	16.73w	16.55	x	16.97	16.95	16.97	
2nd place, silver medalist(s)	Leodan Torrealba	Venezuela	16.14	16.21	x	16.46	16.89w	16.61	16.89w	
3rd place, bronze medalist(s)	Miguel van Assen	Suriname	16.39	x	16.55	15.27	16.59	16.73w	16.73w	
4	Maximiliano Díaz	Argentina	15.79	16.03	16.05	x	x	16.20	16.20	
5	Mateus de Sá	Brazil	15.53	15.31	15.51	–	15.57w	16.03w	16.03w	
6	Geiner Moreno	Colombia	x	x	15.79	15.68	x	15.99	15.99	
7	Frixon Chila	Ecuador	x	15.56	15.68	x	x	15.85	15.85	
8	Gregory Palacios	Ecuador	15.48w	15.16	15.24	15.04	15.40w	14.99	15.48w	
9	Federico Guerrero	Argentina	x	15.21	15.36				15.36	
	Juandel Bueno*	Dominican Republic	15.21	x	15.19w				15.21	
10	Juan David Campo	Colombia	x	15.03	x				15.03	

=== Shot put ===
30 May

Rank	Name	Nationality	#1	#2	#3	#4	#5	#6	Result	Notes
1st place, gold medalist(s)	Welington Morais	Brazil	19.45	19.44	19.64	19.87	x	19.65	19.87	
2nd place, silver medalist(s)	Nazareno Sasia	Argentina	18.31	18.55	19.79	19.25	x	x	19.79	
3rd place, bronze medalist(s)	Ignacio Carballo	Argentina	x	x	18.64	18.47	19.27	19.51	19.51	
4	Willian Braido	Brazil	19.19	18.77	18.62	19.08	18.58	18.95	19.19	
5	José Miguel Ballivián	Chile	x	17.52	x	x	17.66	18.10	18.10	
6	Aldo González	Bolivia	16.68	16.52	16.77	16.02	16.76	16.54	16.77	
7	Jordi Congo	Ecuador	16.08	x	15.09	15.61	15.30	15.88	16.08	
	Steven Cavallos	Ecuador							DNS	

=== Discus throw ===
29 May

Rank	Name	Nationality	#1	#2	#3	#4	#5	#6	Result	Notes
1st place, gold medalist(s)	Lucas Nervi	Chile	61.75	63.10	58.92	x	63.18	58.07	63.18	
2nd place, silver medalist(s)	Alan de Falchi	Brazil	x	x	57.61	x	61.16	x	61.16	
3rd place, bronze medalist(s)	Wellinton da Cruz Filho	Brazil	57.52	58.00	x	57.39	59.55	57.02	59.55	
4	Nazareno Sasia	Argentina	49.79	51.67	x	49.50	49.78	53.56	53.56	
5	Henry Cañas	Colombia	50.21	49.02	48.36	53.31	51.10	52.95	53.31	
6	Gerson Ramírez	Colombia	44.58	48.64	52.23	50.50	48.24	48.64	52.23	
7	Juan Ignacio Solito	Argentina	49.48	52.11	51.98	x	51.44	51.36	52.11	
8	Stefano Paz	Peru	x	46.47	x	48.48	x	x	48.48	
9	Steven Cavallos	Ecuador	45.26	x	44.11				45.26	
	Claudio Romero	Chile							DNS	

=== Hammer throw ===
30 May

Rank	Name	Nationality	#1	#2	#3	#4	#5	#6	Result	Notes
1st place, gold medalist(s)	Humberto Mansilla	Chile	74.53	75.54	75.83	71.38	74.28	75.79	75.83	CR
2nd place, silver medalist(s)	Gabriel Kehr	Chile	72.67	73.89	74.98	x	70.01	75.18	75.18	
3rd place, bronze medalist(s)	Joaquín Gómez	Argentina	68.53	69.57	67.30	69.64	71.32	71.00	71.32	
4	Allan Wolski	Brazil	68.18	70.45	68.92	x	70.71	69.56	70.71	
5	Elías Díaz	Colombia	65.93	63.85	62.49	66.40	62.53	65.62	66.40	
6	Ralf Oliveira	Brazil	x	64.54	61.87	x	64.40	63.69	64.54	
7	Julio Novile	Argentina	x	59.40	58.11	x	x	x	59.40	
8	Cristian Suárez	Ecuador	x	49.24	50.56	49.83	–	–	50.56	

=== Javelin throw ===
29 May

Rank	Name	Nationality	Result	Notes
1st place, gold medalist(s)	Arley Ibargüen	Colombia	75.62	
2nd place, silver medalist(s)	Pedro Henrique Rodrigues	Brazil	73.57	
3rd place, bronze medalist(s)	José Orlando Escobar	Ecuador	72.14	
4	Jean Marcos Mairongo	Ecuador	71.68	
5	Luiz Maurício da Silva	Brazil	70.74	
6	Francisco Muse	Chile	70.53	
7	Jonathan Cedeño	Panama	66.25	
8	Melvin Soto	Bolivia	59.78	
–	Billy Julio	Venezuela	NM	DQ

=== Decathlon ===
30–31 May

The highest mark recorded in each event is highlighted in yellow

Rank	Athlete	Nationality	100m	LJ	SP	HJ	400m	110m H	DT	PV	JT	1500m	Points	Notes
1st place, gold medalist(s)	Andy Preciado	Ecuador	10.95	6.87	14.16	2.07	51.28	14.23	49.88	4.50	61.74	4:45.03	8004	CR, NR
2nd place, silver medalist(s)	Felipe dos Santos	Brazil	10.51	7.13	13.56	1.92	49.63	14.20	41.49	4.90	58.14	4:45.78	7960	
3rd place, bronze medalist(s)	Georni Jaramillo	Venezuela	10.96	7.23	15.74	1.86	50.12	14.11	45.04	4.50	56.48	5:34.44	7613	
4	Gerson Izaguirre	Venezuela	10.94	7.09	14.04	1.92	50.29	14.04	41.44	4.50	51.97	4:57.70	7586	
	José Miguel Paulino*	Dominican Republic	10.99	7.04	14.09	1.92	49.97	15.05	40.25	4.00	58.89	4:48.38	7446	
5	José Fernando Ferreira	Brazil	11.10	6.94	13.20	1.89	52.23	15.48	43.04	4.40	60.94	5:17.42	7202	
6	Julio Angulo	Colombia	11.02	6.53	11.18	1.89	49.70	15.15	32.72	NM	37.09	5:34.44	5799	
	José Lemos	Colombia	DNS	–	–	–	–	–	–	–	–	–	DNS	

== Women's results ==
=== 100 meters ===
Heats – 29 May
Wind:
Heat 1: +0.7 m/s, Heat 2: +1.7 m/s

Rank	Heat	Name	Nationality	Time	Notes
1	1	Marizol Landázuri	Ecuador	11.41	Q
2	1	Vitória Cristina Rosa	Brazil	11.46	Q
3	2	Jasmine Abrams	Guyana	11.59	Q
4	2	Natalia Linares	Colombia	11.62	Q
5	2	Ana Carolina Azevedo	Brazil	11.69	Q
6	1	María Ignacia Montt	Chile	11.79	Q
7	2	María Florencia Lamboglia	Argentina	11.90	q
8	2	Nicole Chala	Ecuador	12.08	q
9	1	Shary Vallecilla	Colombia	12.10	
10	2	Leticia Arispe	Bolivia	12.11	
11	1	Martina Coronato	Uruguay	12.16	

Final – 29 May
Wind:
+1.0 m/s

Rank	Lane	Name	Nationality	Time	Notes
1st place, gold medalist(s)	5	Vitória Cristina Rosa	Brazil	11.31	
2nd place, silver medalist(s)	4	Marizol Landázuri	Ecuador	11.39	
3rd place, bronze medalist(s)	3	Jasmine Abrams	Guyana	11.50	
4	6	Natalia Linares	Colombia	11.55	
5	7	María Ignacia Montt	Chile	11.77	
6	8	Ana Carolina Azevedo	Brazil	11.78	
7	2	María Florencia Lamboglia	Argentina	11.85	
8	1	Nicole Chala	Ecuador	12.11	

Extra – 29 May
Wind: 0.0 m/s

Rank	Lane	Name	Nationality	Time	Notes
1	3	Ana Cláudia Lemos	Brazil	11.46	
2	4	Vida Caetano	Brazil	11.85	
3	5	Katherine Chillambo	Ecuador	12.26	
4	2	Evelyn Mercado	Ecuador	12.29	

=== 200 meters ===
Heats – 31 May
Wind:
Heat 1: +1.7 m/s, Heat 2: +2.2 m/s

Rank	Heat	Name	Nationality	Time	Notes
1	1	Vitória Cristina Rosa	Brazil	23.25	Q
2	1	Marizol Landázuri	Ecuador	23.63	Q
3	2	Ana Carolina Azevedo	Brazil	23.88	Q
4	2	María Florencia Lamboglia	Argentina	24.07	Q
5	1	Shary Vallecilla	Colombia	24.22	Q
6	2	Nicol Caicedo	Ecuador	24.67	Q
7	2	Leticia Arispe	Bolivia	24.78	q
8	1	Cecilia Gómez	Bolivia	24.91	q
9	1	Noelia Martínez	Argentina	24.94	
10	1	Martina Coronato	Uruguay	25.11	
	2	María Ignacia Montt	Chile	DQ	

Final – 31 May
Wind:
+0.8 m/s

Rank	Lane	Name	Nationality	Time	Notes
1st place, gold medalist(s)	3	Vitória Cristina Rosa	Brazil	23.10	
2nd place, silver medalist(s)	4	Marizol Landázuri	Ecuador	23.35	
3rd place, bronze medalist(s)	5	Ana Carolina Azevedo	Brazil	23.87	
4	6	María Florencia Lamboglia	Argentina	23.94	
5	7	Shary Vallecilla	Colombia	24.31	
6	8	Nicol Caicedo	Ecuador	24.31	
7	1	Leticia Arispe	Bolivia	24.76	
8	2	Cecilia Gómez	Bolivia	24.81	

=== 400 meters ===
Heats – 29 May

Rank	Heat	Name	Nationality	Time	Notes
1	1	Geisa Coutinho	Brazil	53.25	Q
2	2	Tiffani Marinho	Brazil	53.42	Q
3	2	Angie Melisa Arévalo	Colombia	53.77	Q
4	1	Jennifer Padilla	Colombia	53.99	Q
5	2	Stephanie Saavedra	Chile	54.62	Q
6	2	Cecilia Gómez	Bolivia	54.97	q
7	1	María Fernanda Mackenna	Chile	54.99	Q
8	1	Noelia Martínez	Argentina	55.36	q
9	1	Maitte Torres	Peru	56.08	
10	2	María Ayelén Diogo	Argentina	56.25	
11	2	Dayanira Ortiz	Ecuador	56.62	

Final – 29 May

Rank	Lane	Name	Nationality	Time	Notes
1st place, gold medalist(s)	6	Tiffani Marinho	Brazil	52.65	
2nd place, silver medalist(s)	3	Angie Melisa Arévalo	Colombia	52.86	
3rd place, bronze medalist(s)	5	Jennifer Padilla	Colombia	53.03	
4	4	Geisa Coutinho	Brazil	53.55	
5	7	Stephanie Saavedra	Chile	54.50	
6	1	María Fernanda Mackenna	Chile	55.45	
7	2	Noelia Martínez	Argentina	55.73	
8	8	Cecilia Gómez	Bolivia	55.75	

Extra – 29 May

Rank	Lane	Name	Nationality	Time	Notes
1	?	Tabata de Carvalho	Brazil	53.27	
2	?	Maria Victoria de Sena	Brazil	55.09	

=== 800 meters ===
Heats – 30 May

Rank	Heat	Name	Nationality	Time	Notes
1	1	Flávia de Lima	Brazil	2:05.70	Q
2	1	Deborah Rodríguez	Uruguay	2:06.79	Q
3	2	Martina Escudero	Argentina	2:07.44	Q
4	1	Evangelina Thomas	Argentina	2:07.52	Q
5	2	Andrea Foster	Guyana	2:07.93	Q
6	2	Mayara Leite	Brazil	2:08.00	Q
7	2	Andrea Calderón	Ecuador	2:08.13	q
8	1	Lorena Sinisterra	Colombia	2:09.16	q
9	1	Berdine Castillo	Chile	2:09.44	
10	2	Jarly Marín	Colombia	2:11.60	
11	2	Maitte Torres	Peru	2:12.42	
12	2	Josefa Quezada	Chile	2:13.92	
13	1	Dayanira Ortiz	Ecuador	2:16.73	
14	1	Sheyla Vilca	Peru	2:17.10	

Final – 31 May

Rank	Name	Nationality	Time	Notes
1st place, gold medalist(s)	Deborah Rodríguez	Uruguay	2:03.38	
2nd place, silver medalist(s)	Flávia de Lima	Brazil	2:05.00	
3rd place, bronze medalist(s)	Andrea Foster	Guyana	2:05.93	
4	Andrea Calderón	Ecuador	2:06.14	
5	Lorena Sinisterra	Colombia	2:06.34	
6	Evangelina Thomas	Argentina	2:08.73	
7	Martina Escudero	Argentina	2:09.87	
8	Mayara Leite	Brazil	2:14.75	

=== 1500 meters ===
29 May

Rank	Name	Nationality	Time	Notes
1st place, gold medalist(s)	Joselyn Brea	Venezuela	4:15.05	
2nd place, silver medalist(s)	María Pía Fernández	Uruguay	4:15.27	
3rd place, bronze medalist(s)	Mariana Borelli	Argentina	4:15.61	
4	Jaqueline Weber	Brazil	4:18.67	
5	Andrea Calderón	Ecuador	4:23.44	
6	Micaela Levaggi	Argentina	4:25.64	
7	Rejane da Silva	Brazil	4:27.39	
8	Josefa Quezada	Chile	4:28.15	
9	María Leticia Anazco	Paraguay	4:34.66	
10	Stefany López	Colombia	4:35.53	
11	Wendy Criollo	Ecuador	4:44.82	
	Andrea Ferris	Panama	DNS	

=== 5000 meters ===
30 May

Rank	Name	Nationality	Time	Notes
1st place, gold medalist(s)	Edymar Brea	Venezuela	15:47.16	
2nd place, silver medalist(s)	Florencia Borelli	Argentina	15:47.46	
3rd place, bronze medalist(s)	Joselyn Brea	Venezuela	15:48.24	
4	Carolina Tabares	Colombia	15:55.39	
5	Jhoselyn Camargo	Bolivia	16:13.14	NR
6	Marcela Gómez	Argentina	16:18.79	
7	María Pastuña	Ecuador	16:31.30	
8	Simone Ferraz	Brazil	16:41.63	
9	Soledad Torre	Peru	16:42.65	
10	Katerine Tisalema	Ecuador	16:45.64	
11	Jenifer Silva	Brazil	17:08.55	
12	Sofia Luizaga	Bolivia	17:29.26	
	Saida Meneses	Peru	DNF	
	Muriel Coneo	Colombia	DNF	

=== 10,000 meters ===
29 May

Rank	Name	Nationality	Time	Notes
1st place, gold medalist(s)	Edymar Brea	Venezuela	34:05.25	
2nd place, silver medalist(s)	Silvia Ortiz	Ecuador	34:06.61	
3rd place, bronze medalist(s)	Jhoselyn Camargo	Bolivia	34:09.54	NR
4	Paola Bonilla	Ecuador	34:12.65	
5	Marcela Gómez	Argentina	34:13.22	
6	Graziele Zarri	Brazil	34:13.24	
7	Jenifer Silva	Brazil	34:34.78	
8	María Fernanda Montoya	Colombia	34:44.15	
9	Sofia Luizaga	Bolivia	34:44.92	
10	Clarisse Bermúdez	Uruguay	36:45.01	
11	Giselle Álvarez	Chile	37:49.43	
	Chiara Mainetti	Argentina	DNF	

=== 100 meters hurdles ===
29 May
Wind: +2.8 m/s

Rank	Lane	Name	Nationality	Time	Notes
1st place, gold medalist(s)	4	Ketiley Batista	Brazil	12.96	
2nd place, silver medalist(s)	6	Diana Bazalar	Peru	13.47	
3rd place, bronze medalist(s)	2	Jenea McCammon	Guyana	13.63	
4	5	Micaela de Mello	Brazil	13.75	
5	3	Gregoria Gómez	Colombia	13.82	
6	1	Nicol Caicedo	Ecuador	13.87	
7	7	María Florencia Lamboglia	Argentina	14.06	
8	8	Isabel Urrutia	Colombia	14.43	

=== 400 meters hurdles ===
31 May

Rank	Lane	Name	Nationality	Time	Notes
1st place, gold medalist(s)	3	Melissa Gonzalez	Colombia	55.68	CR, NR
2nd place, silver medalist(s)	5	Valeria Cabezas	Colombia	57.56	
3rd place, bronze medalist(s)	4	Chayenne da Silva	Brazil	57.78	
4	7	Virginia Villalba	Ecuador	59.63	
5	8	Andreina Minda	Ecuador	1:02.18	
6	2	Fatima Amarilla	Paraguay	1:04.29	
	6	Bianca dos Santos	Brazil	DNF	

=== 3000 meters steeplechase ===
30 May

Rank	Name	Nationality	Time	Notes
1st place, gold medalist(s)	Tatiane da Silva	Brazil	9:38.71	CR
2nd place, silver medalist(s)	Simone Ferraz	Brazil	9:45.15	
3rd place, bronze medalist(s)	Belén Casetta	Argentina	9:45.79	
4	Carolina Lozano	Argentina	10:01.53	
5	Rina Cjuro	Peru	10:13.29	
6	Stefany López	Colombia	10:14.81	
7	Katerine Tisalema	Ecuador	10:17.00	
8	Rolanda Bell	Panama	10:22.33	
9	Leydi Romero	Colombia	10:26.18	
10	Margarita Núñez	Peru	10:50.50	
11	Lisbeth Vicuña	Ecuador	10:59.63	

=== 4 × 100 meters relay ===
31 May

Rank	Lane	Nation	Competitors	Time	Notes
1st place, gold medalist(s)	5	Brazil	Aurora Vida, Ana Cláudia Lemos, Ana Carolina Azevedo, Micaela de Mello	44.91	
2nd place, silver medalist(s)	3	Colombia	Valeria Cabezas, Shary Vallecilla, Gregoria Gómez, Natalia Linares	45.61	
3rd place, bronze medalist(s)	4	Ecuador	Ginger Quintero, Katherine Chillambo, Nicol Caicedo, Marizol Landázuri	45.66	

=== 4 × 400 meters relay ===
31 May

Rank	Nation	Competitors	Time	Notes
1st place, gold medalist(s)	Colombia	Angie Melisa Arévalo, Rosangélica Escobar, Melissa Gonzalez, Evelis Aguilar	3:31.04	
2nd place, silver medalist(s)	Chile	Stephanie Saavedra, María José Echeverría, María Fernanda Mackenna, Martina Weil	3:34.89	
3rd place, bronze medalist(s)	Brazil	Tábata de Carvalho, Flávia de Lima, Maria Victoria de Sena, Chayenne da Silva	3:36.40	
4	Ecuador	Dayanira Ortiz, Marizol Landázuri, Evelyn Mercado, Virginia Villalba	3:44.47	
5	Argentina	María Ayelén Diogo, Evangelina Thomas, María Florencia Lamboglia, Noelia Martínez	3:44.69	

=== 20,000 meters walk ===
29 May

Rank	Name	Nationality	Time	Notes
1st place, gold medalist(s)	Glenda Morejón	Ecuador	1:29:24.61	CR, AR, WL
2nd place, silver medalist(s)	Érica de Sena	Brazil	1:30:51.97	NR
3rd place, bronze medalist(s)	Maritza Guamán	Ecuador	1:32:46.25	
4	Leyde Guerra	Peru	1:33:52.35	
5	Ángela Castro	Bolivia	1:34:35.32	
6	Yeseida Carrillo	Colombia	1:35:42.41	
	Paula Milena Torres*	Ecuador	1:38:04.53	
7	Gabriela Muniz	Brazil	1:41:56.37	
8	Yossy Caballero	Peru	1:50:54.29	

=== High jump ===
30 May

Rank	Name	Nationality	1.60	1.65	1.68	1.71	1.74	1.77	1.80	1.83	1.86	1.89	1.92	Result	Notes
1st place, gold medalist(s)	Jennifer Rodríguez	Colombia	–	–	–	–	o	–	xo	o	o	xxo	xxx	1.89	
2nd place, silver medalist(s)	Valdileia Martins	Brazil	–	–	–	–	o	o	o	o	o	xxx		1.86	
3rd place, bronze medalist(s)	Joice Micolta	Ecuador	–	o	–	o	o	xxo	o	xo	xxx			1.83	
4	Silvina Gil	Uruguay	–	o	o	xo	o	xxx						1.74	
5	Sarah Freitas	Brazil	–	–	o	o	xo	xxx						1.74	
6	Abril Okon	Argentina	o	o	o	xxo	xxx							1.71	
7	Catalina Ossa	Chile	o	o	xo	xxo	xxx							1.71	
8	Carla Lorena Ríos	Bolivia	o	xo	xxx									1.65	

=== Pole vault ===
29 May

Rank	Name	Nationality	3.70	3.80	3.90	4.00	4.10	4.30	4.40	Result	Notes
1st place, gold medalist(s)	Katherine Castillo	Colombia	–	–	–	o	xo	xo	xxx	4.30	NR
2nd place, silver medalist(s)	Isabel Demarco	Brazil	–	o	xo	xo	xxx			4.00	
3rd place, bronze medalist(s)	Alejandra Arevalo	Peru	o	xo	xo	xxo	xxx			4.00	
4	Valeria Chiaraviglio	Argentina	o	o	o	xxx				3.90	
5	Nicole Hein	Peru	o	xxo	o	xxx				3.90	
6	Iriondo Gómez	Argentina	o	xo	xo	xxx				3.90	
7	Antonia Crestani	Chile	xo	xxx						3.70	
8	Juliana Campos	Brazil	xxo	xxx						3.70	
	Luna Nazarit	Colombia	xxx							NM	

=== Long jump ===
29 May

Rank	Name	Nationality	Result	Notes
1st place, gold medalist(s)	Leticia Oro Melo	Brazil	6.63	
2nd place, silver medalist(s)	Eliane Martins	Brazil	6.57	
3rd place, bronze medalist(s)	Nathalee Aranda	Panama	6.34	
4	Natalia Linares	Colombia	6.33	
5	Paola Mautino	Peru	6.32	
6	Macarena Reyes	Chile	6.28	
7	María Trinidad Hurtado	Chile	6.06	
8	Valeria Quispe	Bolivia	5.60	
9	Evelyn Zurita	Ecuador	5.55	

=== Triple jump ===
30 May

Rank	Name	Nationality	#1	#2	#3	#4	#5	#6	Result	Notes
1st place, gold medalist(s)	Keila Costa	Brazil	13.45	13.06	13.67	–	13.55	–	13.67	
2nd place, silver medalist(s)	Liuba Zaldívar	Ecuador	12.65	13.33	13.58	x	13.23	12.84	13.58	
3rd place, bronze medalist(s)	Gabriele dos Santos	Brazil	13.27	13.40	x	13.45	x	x	13.45	
4	Silvana Segura	Peru	13.32	x	x	12.94	12.58	12.53	13.32	
5	Adriana Chila	Ecuador	13.14	13.07	13.19	12.48	12.89	13.28	13.28	
6	Parra Landázury	Colombia	12.72w	12.82	12.67	x	x	x	12.82	
7	Silvina Ocampos	Argentina	x	x	12.72	x	x	x	12.72	
8	Valeria Quispe	Bolivia	x	12.27	12.38	x	x	12.68w	12.68w	

=== Shot put ===
30 May

Rank	Name	Nationality	#1	#2	#3	#4	#5	#6	Result	Notes
1st place, gold medalist(s)	Livia Avancini	Brazil	17.34	16.64	16.98	x	17.17	17.00	17.34	
2nd place, silver medalist(s)	Ahymara Espinoza	Venezuela	x	16.92	x	16.95	x	x	16.95	
3rd place, bronze medalist(s)	Ivanna Gallardo	Chile	16.17	16.33	16.94	16.59	16.63	16.26	16.94	
4	Keely Medeiros	Brazil	15.61	16.58	15.67	15.45	16.16	15.91	16.58	
5	Sandra Lemos	Colombia	15.60	15.50	16.01	x	x	15.23	16.01	
6	Ángela Rivas	Colombia	15.68	15.29	15.85	15.68	15.23	x	15.85	
7	Polet Méndez	Ecuador	13.37	12.77	12.33	x	13.06	13.54	13.54	
8	Iara Capurro	Argentina	10.31	12.36	12.44	11.81	x	12.70	12.70	
9	Ginger Quintero	Ecuador	11.96	12.41	12.17				12.41	
	Ailen Armada	Argentina	x	x	x				NM	

=== Discus throw ===
29 May

Rank	Name	Nationality	#1	#2	#3	#4	#5	#6	Result	Notes
1st place, gold medalist(s)	Izabela da Silva	Brazil	x	54.11	x	57.89	62.18	59.44	62.18	PB
2nd place, silver medalist(s)	Karen Gallardo	Chile	59.72	58.34	58.86	59.15	58.70	52.29	59.72	
3rd place, bronze medalist(s)	Lidiane Cansian	Brazil	55.61	53.01	55.55	53.36	52.93	x	55.61	
4	Yerlin Mesa	Colombia	55.07	53.54	53.91	53.96	54.84	54.41	55.07	
5	Ailen Armada	Argentina	54.67	50.00	x	53.33	x	51.23	54.67	
6	Iara Capurro	Argentina	49.40	53.24	45.79	50.08	52.35	50.57	53.24	
7	Merari Herrera	Ecuador	45.64	x	47.14	46.78	x	48.39	48.39	
8	Brigidh Mayorga	Colombia	44.67	44.09	47.59	45.12	44.65	45.00	47.59	
9	Sofia Bausero	Uruguay	43.26	43.17	x				43.26	
10	Nereida Santa Cruz	Ecuador	33.62	x	x				33.62	

=== Hammer throw ===
30 May

Rank	Name	Nationality	#1	#2	#3	#4	#5	#6	Result	Notes
1st place, gold medalist(s)	Mariana Marcelino	Brazil	66.16	x	61.94	62.75	64.90	x	66.16	
2nd place, silver medalist(s)	Mariana García	Chile	x	63.20	62.85	58.44	x	x	63.20	
3rd place, bronze medalist(s)	Mayra Gaviria	Colombia	62.46	x	x	x	x	59.68	62.46	
4	Ximena Zorrilla	Peru	60.94	61.75	61.89	62.34	58.26	61.10	62.34	NU23R
5	Valeria Chiliquinga	Ecuador	61.91	57.05	57.78	60.66	54.91	60.70	61.91	
6	Daniela Gómez	Argentina	x	59.59	58.18	x	56.47	x	59.59	
7	Anna Paula Pereira	Brazil	x	58.21	59.07	x	57.65	59.48	59.48	
8	Nereida Santa Cruz	Ecuador	49.35	x	53.25	54.92	54.97	56.05	56.05	

=== Javelin throw ===
29 May

Rank	Name	Nationality	Result	Notes
1st place, gold medalist(s)	Laila Ferrer e Silva	Brazil	59.97	
2nd place, silver medalist(s)	María Lucelly Murillo	Colombia	59.92	
3rd place, bronze medalist(s)	Jucilene de Lima	Brazil	59.65	
4	Juleisy Angulo	Ecuador	55.38	
5	Flor Ruiz	Colombia	54.10	
	Coraly Ortiz*	Puerto Rico	53.70	
6	María Paz Ríos	Chile	49.78	
7	Linda González	Ecuador	49.49	
8	Dominella Arias	Argentina	45.08	

=== Heptathlon ===
29–30 May

The highest mark recorded in each event is highlighted in yellow

Rank	Athlete	Nationality	100m H	HJ	SP	200m	LJ	JT	800m	Points	Notes
1st place, gold medalist(s)	Evelis Aguilar	Colombia	14.12	1.70	13.99	24.18	6.11	45.64	2:12.10	6165	CR
2nd place, silver medalist(s)	Martha Araújo	Colombia	13.49	1.61	13.17	24.97	6.06	46.45	2:23.28	5866	
3rd place, bronze medalist(s)	Raiane Procópio	Brazil	14.35	1.73	12.91	25.31	5.75	43.80	2:14.01	5821	
4	Tamara de Sousa	Brazil	13.95	1.76	13.59	25.13	5.73	44.65	2:39.78	5655	
5	Joyce Micolta	Ecuador	15.14	1.79	10.56	26.87	5.50	34.26	2:36.14	4954	
6	Genesis Foronda	Ecuador	16.56	1.43	9.76	28.19	4.51	36.11	DNF	3345	

== Mixed events ==
=== 4 × 400 meters relay ===
30 May

Rank	Nation	Competitors	Time	Notes
1st place, gold medalist(s)	Colombia	Raúl Mena (M), Angie Melisa Arévalo (W), Jennifer Padilla (W), Nicolás Salinas (M)	3:21.38	CR
2nd place, silver medalist(s)	Argentina	Leandro Paris (M), María Ayelén Diogo (W), Noelia Martínez (W), Elián Larregina (M)	3:23.77	
3rd place, bronze medalist(s)	Ecuador	Anderson Colorado (M), Virginia Villalba (W), Evelyn Mercado (W), Alan Minda (M)	3:27.97	
