= Athletics at the 2022 South American Games =

Athletics competitions at the 2022 South American Games

- Athletics pictogram
- Venue: Athletics National Center; Costanera José Asunción Flores
- Dates: 12–15 October
- Competitors: 321 from 13 nations

Athletics competitions at the 2022 South American Games in Asunción, Paraguay will be held from 12 to 15 October 2022 at the Athletics National Center in the Parque Olímpico cluster in Luque, a sub-venue outside Asunción, with the marathon and 35 km racewalks being held at Costanera José Asunción Flores.

Forty nine medal events are scheduled to be contested; 48 events equally divided among men and women plus a 4 × 400 metres relay mixed event. A total of 324 athletes will compete in the events. The events were open competitions without age restrictions.

Athletes who achieve the gold medal in each event will qualify for the 2023 Pan American Games, with the qualification quotas going to the athletes and not their NOCs.

Brazil are the athletics competitions defending champions having won them in the previous edition in Cochabamba 2018.

== Participating nations ==
A total of 13 nations registered athletes for the athletics competitions. Each nation was able to enter a maximum of 85 athletes; up to 2 men and 2 women for the individual events and one team for each relay event:

- Argentina (27 athletes)
- Bolivia (15)
- Brazil (56)
- Chile (32)
- Colombia (49)
- Curaçao (1)
- Ecuador (30)
- Panama (5)
- Paraguay (51)
- Peru (19)
- Suriname (4)
- Uruguay (9)
- Venezuela (25)

== Venues ==
The athletics competitions were held in two venues. Road events (marathons and 35 km racewalks) will take place at Costanera José Asunción Flores in Asunción, while track and field events (including 20 km racewalks) will be held at Athletics National Center located within the Parque Olímpico in Luque. The athletic track has a certificate of the World Athletics.

== Medal summary ==
=== Medal table ===
* Host nation (Paraguay)

Rank	Nation	Gold	Silver	Bronze	Total
1	Brazil (BRA)	15	12	15	42
2	Colombia (COL)	8	7	9	24
3	Argentina (ARG)	7	4	3	14
4	Venezuela (VEN)	6	4	2	12
5	Ecuador (ECU)	5	8	6	19
6	Chile (CHI)	4	6	3	13
7	Uruguay (URU)	2	2	1	5
8	Peru (PER)	1	2	5	8
9	Panama (PAN)	1	0	1	2
10	Paraguay (PAR)*	0	3	1	4
11	Curaçao (CUR)	0	1	0	1
12	Bolivia (BOL)	0	0	3	3
Totals (12 entries)		49	49	49	147

Source: ASU2022 Medal Table - Athletics

=== Medalists ===
==== Men's events ====
Event	Gold		Silver		Bronze	
100 metres	Franco Florio; Argentina	10.35	Felipe Bardi; Brazil	10.37	Carlos Palacios; Colombia	10.46
200 metres	Lucas da Silva; Brazil	20.89	Anderson Marquinez; Ecuador	20.95	Rafael Vásquez; Venezuela	21.15
400 metres	Elián Larregina; Argentina	45.80	Kelvis Padrino; Venezuela	46.41	Lucas Carvalho; Brazil	46.47
800 metres	Chamar Chambers; Panama	1:46.99	José Antonio Maita; Venezuela	1:47.26	Eduardo Moreira; Brazil	1:47.39
1500 metres	Guilherme Kurtz; Brazil	3:41.58	Santiago Catrofe; Uruguay	3:42.57	José Zabala; Argentina	3:44.42
5000 metres	Santiago Catrofe; Uruguay	13:55.24	Ignacio Velásquez; Chile	14:01.12	David Ninavia; Bolivia	14:08.37
10,000 metres	Carlos Díaz; Chile	29:15.66	Ignacio Velásquez; Chile	29:30.81	Héctor Garibay; Bolivia	29:35.87
110 metres hurdles	Eduardo de Deus; Brazil	13.70	Fanor Escobar; Colombia	13.96	Gabriel Constantino; Brazil	14.00
400 metres hurdles	Fanor Escobar; Colombia	50.63	Bruno De Genaro; Argentina	50.68	Hederson Estefani; Brazil	50.99
3000 metres steeplechase	Gerard Giraldo; Colombia	8:40.28	Carlos San Martín; Colombia	8:52.46	Diddier Rodríguez; Panama	8:54.61
4 × 100 metres relay	Venezuela (VEN); David Vivas; Rafael Vásquez; Alexis Nieves; Abdel Kalil	39.47	Paraguay (PAR); Jonathan Wolk; Fredy Maidana; Nilo Duré; César Almirón	39.60	Colombia (COL); Jhonny Rentería; Carlos Flórez; Óscar Baltán; Carlos Palacios	39.74
4 × 400 metres relay	Venezuela (VEN); Julio Rodríguez; José Antonio Maita; Javier Gómez; Kelvis Padrino	3:06.54	Brazil (BRA); Lucas da Silva; Lucas Carvalho; Douglas da Silva; Vitor de Miranda	3:06.79	Colombia (COL); Nicolás Salinas; Kevin Mina; Neiker Abello; Raúl Mena	3:09.40
Marathon	Christian Vascónez; Ecuador	2:16:34 GR	Derlys Ayala; Paraguay	2:17:11	Ernesto Zamora; Uruguay	2:17:42
20 kilometres race walk	Brian Pintado; Ecuador	1:19:43 GR	David Hurtado; Ecuador	1:20:44	Caio Bonfim; Brazil	1:21:01
35 kilometres race walk	Caio Bonfim; Brazil	2:34:17 GR	César Rodríguez; Peru	2:35:20	Diego Pinzón; Colombia	2:35:27
High jump	Thiago Moura; Brazil	2.19 m	Gilmar Correa; Colombia	2.13 m	Nicolás Numair; Chile	2.10 m
Pole vault	Germán Chiaraviglio; Argentina	5.45 m	Dyander Pacho; Ecuador	5.35 m	Augusto Dutra de Oliveira; Brazil	5.30 m
Long jump	José Luis Mandros; Peru	8.07 m	Emiliano Lasa; Uruguay	7.93 m	Jhon Berrío; Colombia	7.89 m
Triple jump	Leodan Torrealba; Venezuela	16.31 m	Frixon Chila; Ecuador	16.03 m	Mateus de Sá; Brazil	15.98 m
Shot put	Welington Morais; Brazil	20.00	Willian Dourado; Brazil	19.77	Nazareno Sasia; Argentina	19.73
Discus throw	Claudio Romero; Chile	64.99 m GR	Mauricio Ortega; Colombia	63.59 m	Juan José Caicedo; Ecuador	62.10 m
Hammer throw	Gabriel Kehr; Chile	76.81 m GR	Humberto Mansilla; Chile	74.12 m	Joaquín Gómez; Argentina	73.56 m
Javelin throw	Luiz Maurício da Silva; Brazil	76.90 m	Billy Julio; Colombia	74.38 m	Antonio Ortiz; Paraguay	70.96 m
Decathlon	Felipe dos Santos; Brazil	7692 pts	Andy Preciado; Ecuador	7679 pts	Gerson Izaguirre; Venezuela	7449 pts

==== Women's events ====
Event	Gold		Silver		Bronze	
100 metres	Ana Azevedo; Brazil	11.75	María Florencia Lamboglia; Argentina	11.90	Ángela Tenorio; Ecuador	11.93
200 metres	Anahí Suárez; Ecuador	23.06	Orangy Jiménez; Venezuela	23.31	Ana Azevedo; Brazil	23.43
400 metres	Evelis Aguilar; Colombia	51.90	Martina Weil; Chile	51.92	Anahí Suárez; Ecuador	52.24
800 metres	Déborah Rodríguez; Uruguay	2:08.14	Jaqueline Weber; Brazil	2:08.97	Rosangélica Escobar; Colombia	2:09.56
1500 metres	Fedra Luna; Argentina	4:14.69 GR	Mariana Borelli; Argentina	4:16.49	Jaqueline Weber; Brazil	4:17.50
5000 metres	Fedra Luna; Argentina	15:41.78 GR	Joselyn Brea; Venezuela	15:42.70	Luz Mery Rojas; Peru	15:49.85
10,000 metres	Florencia Borelli; Argentina	33:43.37	Daiana Ocampo; Argentina	33:46.47	Luz Mery Rojas; Peru	33:50.44
100 metres hurdles	Yoveinny Mota; Venezuela	13.60	Micaela de Mello; Brazil	13.69	María Alejandra Murillo; Colombia	14.06
400 metres hurdles	Valeria Cabezas; Colombia	57.17	Chayenne da Silva; Brazil	57.91	Liliane Parrela; Brazil	57.92
3000 metres steeplechase	Belén Casetta; Argentina	10:23.28	Mirelle da Silva; Brazil	10:25.28	Stefany López; Colombia	10:26.82
4 × 100 metres relay	Colombia (COL); Angélica Gamboa; Evelyn Rivera; Melany Bolaño; María Alejandra Murillo	44.61	Chile (CHI); Macarena Borie; María Ignacia Montt; Isidora Jiménez; Javiera Cañas	45.04	Brazil (BRA); Vida Aurora; Ana Azevedo; Gabriela Mourão; Micaela de Mello	45.43
4 × 400 metres relay	Colombia (COL); Lina Licona; Rosangélica Escobar; Valeria Cabezas; Evelis Aguilar	3:31.30 GR	Brazil (BRA); Tábata de Carvalho; Liliane Parrela; Maria Victória de Sena; Tiffani Marinho	3:35.61	Chile (CHI); Rocío Muñoz; Berdine Castillo; Poulette Cardoch; Martina Weil	3:37.58
Marathon	Rosa Chacha; Ecuador	2:34:25 GR	Soledad Torre; Peru	2:37:02	Helen Baltazar; Bolivia	2:50:31
20 kilometres race walk	Glenda Morejón; Ecuador	1:31:34 GR	Viviane Lyra; Brazil	1:32:31	Evelyn Inga; Peru	1:35:49
35 kilometres race walk	Viviane Lyra; Brazil	2:50:57 GR	Karla Jaramillo; Ecuador	2:54:01	Evelyn Inga; Peru	2:54:54
High jump	Valdileia Martins; Brazil	1.87 m	Glenka Antonia; Curaçao	1.81 m	Sarah Freitas; Brazil	1.78 m
Pole vault	Robeilys Peinado; Venezuela	4.20 m	Juliana Campos; Brazil	4.20 m	Isabel de Quadros; Brazil	4.10 m
Long jump	Leticia Oro Melo; Brazil	6.64 m	Natalia Linares; Colombia	6.43 m	Yuliana Angulo; Ecuador	6.22 m
Triple jump	Gabriele dos Santos; Brazil	13.74 m	Liuba Zaldívar; Ecuador	13.49 m	Núbia Soares; Brazil	13.10 m
Shot put	Natalia Duco; Chile	17.08 m	Ivana Gallardo; Chile	16.73 m	Ana Caroline da Silva; Brazil	16.40 m
Discus throw	Izabela da Silva; Brazil	60.86 m GR	Andressa de Morais; Brazil	60.10 m	Karen Gallardo; Chile	57.62 m
Hammer throw	Rosa Rodríguez; Venezuela	68.90 m	Mayra Gaviria; Colombia	65.40 m	Ximena Zorrilla; Peru	62.78 m
Javelin throw	Flor Ruiz; Colombia	62.97 m GR	Jucilene de Lima; Brazil	62.42 m	Juleisy Angulo; Ecuador	61.10 m NR
Heptathlon	Martha Araújo; Colombia	6112 pts GR	Ana Camila Pirelli; Paraguay	5756 pts	Joice Micolta; Ecuador	5396 pts

==== Mixed event ====
Event	Gold		Silver		Bronze	
4 × 400 metres relay	Brazil (BRA); Anderson Freitas; Maria Victória de Sena; Douglas Mendes da Silva; Tábata de Carvalho	3:21.53 GR	Ecuador (ECU); Francisco Tejeda; Evelyn Mercado; Alan Minda; Nicole Caicedo	3:22.27 NR	Colombia (COL); Nicolás Salinas; Rosangélica Escobar; Raúl Mena; Lina Licona	3:22.87
