= 2021 South American Championships in Athletics =

52nd South American Championships
- Dates: 29–31 May
- Host city: Guayaquil, Ecuador
- Venue: Estadio Modelo Alberto Spencer Herrera
- Level: Senior
- Events: 45 (22 men, 22 women, 1 mixed)
- Participation: 367 athletes from 15 nations

2021 South American Championships in Athletics was the 52nd edition of the biennial athletics competition between South American nations. The event was held in Guayaquil, Ecuador, from 29 to 31 May at the Estadio Modelo Alberto Spencer Herrera. It should be organised by Buenos Aires but the venue was cancelled due to Covid-19 pandemic.

== Medal summary ==
=== Men ===
Event	Gold		Silver		Bronze	
100 metres (wind: +2.3 m/s)	Felipe Bardi (BRA)	10.10	Emanuel Archibald (GUY)	10.23	Derick Silva (BRA)	10.35
200 metres (wind: +1.9 m/s)	Felipe Bardi (BRA)	20.49	Lucas Vilar (BRA)	20.62	Anderson Marquínez (ECU)	20.63
400 metres	Kelvis Padrino (VEN)	45.82	Lucas Carvalho (BRA)	46.31	Raúl Mena (COL)	46.58
800 metres	Thiago André (BRA)	1:45.62	Jhonatan Rodríguez (COL)	1:47.01 NU20R	Ryan López (VEN)	1:47.78
1500 metres	Thiago André (BRA)	3:37.92	Federico Bruno (ARG)	3:38.25	Santiago Catrofe (URU)	3:38.67
5,000 metres	Altobeli da Silva (BRA)	13:51.81	Carlos Díaz (CHI)	13:52.63	Yuri Labra (PER)	13:55.84
10,000 metres	Daniel Ferreira do Nascimento (BRA)	29:18.06	Nicolás Cuestas (URU)	29:38.72	Martín Cuestas (URU)	29:47.82
110 metres hurdles (wind: +0.7 m/s)	Rafael Pereira (BRA)	13.35	Yohan Chaverra (COL)	13.53	Marcos Herrera (ECU)	13.77
400 metres hurdles	Mahau Suguimati (BRA)	51.25	Kevin Mina (COL)	51.39	Andrés Silva (URU)	51.42
3000 m steeplechase	Altobeli da Silva (BRA)	8:34.17	Carlos San Martín (COL)	8:34.32	Mario Bazán (PER)	8:36.71
4 × 100 metres relay	Brazil; Erik Cardoso; Felipe Bardi; Derick Silva; Bruno de Barros	39.10	Colombia; Jhonny Rentería; John Paredes; Carlos Palacios; Arnovis Dalmero	39.65	Guyana; Jeremy Bascom; Emanuel Archibald; Akeem Stuart; Noelex Holder	40.02
4 × 400 metres relay	Brazil; Bruno de Barros; Lucas Carvalho; João Cabral; Pedro Luiz de Oliveira	3:04.25	Colombia; Kevin Mina; Raúl Mena; Nicolás Salinas; Fanor Escobar	3:08.15	Ecuador; Edison Acuña; Alan Minda; Miguel Maldonado; Anderson Marquinez	3:13.74
20,000 m track walk	Andrés Chocho (ECU)	1:24:18.9	Jhon Castañeda (COL)	1:24:32.0	Jhonatan Amores (ECU)	1:24:49.1
High jump	Fernando Ferreira (BRA)	2.29	Thiago Moura (BRA)	2.23	Carlos Layoy (ARG)	2.17
Pole vault	Germán Chiaraviglio (ARG)	5.55	Dyander Pacho (ECU)	5.30	Abel Curtinove (BRA)	5.20
Long jump	Arnovis Dalmero (COL)	7.94 (+1.7)	Emiliano Lasa (URU)	7.94 (+1.4)	Alexsandro Melo (BRA)	7.93 (+1.2)
Triple jump	Alexsandro Melo (BRA)	16.97 (+1.7)	Leodan Torrealba (VEN)	16.89 (+2.1)	Miguel van Assen (SUR)	16.73 (+2.5)
Shot put	Welington Morais (BRA)	19.87	Nazareno Sasia (ARG)	19.79	Ignacio Carballo (ARG)	19.51
Discus throw	Lucas Nervi (CHI)	63.18	Alan de Falchi (BRA)	61.16	Wellinton da Cruz Filho (BRA)	59.55
Hammer throw	Humberto Mansilla (CHI)	75.83	Gabriel Kehr (CHI)	75.18	Joaquín Gómez (ARG)	71.32
Javelin throw	Arley Ibargüen (COL)	75.62	Pedro Henrique Rodrigues (BRA)	73.57	José Orlando Escobar (ECU)	72.14
Decathlon	Andy Preciado (ECU)	8004 CR, NR	Felipe dos Santos (BRA)	7960	Georni Jaramillo (VEN)	7613
WR world record | AR area record | CR championship record | GR games record | NR national record | OR Olympic record | PB personal best | SB season best | WL world leading (in a given season)

=== Women ===
Event	Gold		Silver		Bronze	
100 metres (wind: +1.0 m/s)	Vitória Cristina Rosa (BRA)	11.31	Marizol Landázuri (ECU)	11.39	Jasmine Abrams (GUY)	11.50
200 metres (wind: +0.8 m/s)	Vitória Cristina Rosa (BRA)	23.10	Marizol Landázuri (ECU)	23.35	Ana Carolina Azevedo (BRA)	23.87
400 metres	Tiffani Marinho (BRA)	52.65	Angie Melisa Arévalo (COL)	52.86	Jennifer Padilla (COL)	53.03
800 metres	Déborah Rodríguez (URU)	2:03.38	Flávia de Lima (BRA)	2:05.00	Andrea Foster (GUY)	2:05.93
1500 metres	Joselyn Brea (VEN)	4:15.05	María Pía Fernández (URU)	4:15.27	Mariana Borelli (ARG)	4:15.61
5000 metres	Edymar Brea (VEN)	15:47.16	Florencia Borelli (ARG)	15:47.46	Joselyn Brea (VEN)	15:48.24
10,000 metres	Edymar Brea (VEN)	34:05.25	Silvia Ortiz (ECU)	34:06.61	Jhoselyn Camargo (BOL)	34:09.54
100 metres hurdles (wind: +2.8 m/s)	Ketiley Batista (BRA)	12.96	Diana Bazalar (PER)	13.47	Jenea McCammon (GUY)	13.63
400 metres hurdles	Melissa Gonzalez (COL)	55.68 CR, NR	Valeria Cabezas (COL)	57.56	Chayenne da Silva (BRA)	57.78
3000 m steeplechase	Tatiane Raquel da Silva (BRA)	9:38.71	Simone Ferraz (BRA)	9:45.15	Belén Casetta (ARG)	9:45.79
4 × 100 metres relay	Brazil; Aurora Vida; Ana Cláudia Lemos; Ana Carolina Azevedo; Micaela de Mello	44.91	Colombia; Valeria Cabezas; Shary Vallecilla; Gregoria Gómez; Natalia Linares	45.61	Ecuador; Ginger Quintero; Katherine Chillambo; Nicol Caicedo; Marizol Landázuri	45.66
4 × 400 metres relay	Colombia; Angie Melisa Arévalo; Rosangélica Escobar; Melissa Gonzalez; Evelis Aguilar	3:31.04	Chile; Stephanie Saavedra; María José Echeverría; María Fernanda Mackenna; Martina Weil	3:34.89	Brazil; Tábata de Carvalho; Flávia de Lima; Maria Victoria de Sena; Chayenne da Silva	3:36.40
20,000 m track walk	Glenda Morejón (ECU)	1:29:24.61 CR, AR, WL	Érica de Sena (BRA)	1:30:51.97 NR	Maritza Guamán (ECU)	1:32:46.25
High jump	Jennifer Rodríguez (COL)	1.89	Valdileia Martins (BRA)	1.86	Joice Micolta (ECU)	1.83 NR
Pole vault	Katherine Castillo (COL)	4.30 NR	Isabel Demarco (BRA)	4.00	Alejandra Arévalo (PER)	4.00
Long jump	Leticia Oro Melo (BRA)	6.63 (+1.2)	Eliane Martins (BRA)	6.57 (+0.9)	Nathalee Aranda (PAN)	6.34 (+0.9)
Triple jump	Keila Costa (BRA)	13.67	Liuba Zaldívar (ECU)	13.58	Gabriele dos Santos (BRA)	13.45
Shot Put	Livia Avancini (BRA)	17.34	Ahymara Espinoza (VEN)	16.95	Ivana Gallardo (CHI)	16.94
Discus Throw	Izabela da Silva (BRA)	62.18	Karen Gallardo (CHI)	58.20	Lidiane Cansian (BRA)	54.39
Hammer throw	Mariana Marcelino (BRA)	66.16	Mariana García (CHI)	63.20	Mayra Gaviria (COL)	62.46
Javelin throw	Laila Ferrer e Silva (BRA)	59.97	María Lucelly Murillo (COL)	59.92	Jucilene de Lima (BRA)	59.65
Heptathlon	Evelis Aguilar (COL)	6165 CR	Martha Araújo (COL)	5866	Raiane Procópio (BRA)	5821
WR world record | AR area record | CR championship record | GR games record | NR national record | OR Olympic record | PB personal best | SB season best | WL world leading (in a given season)

=== Mixed ===
Event	Gold		Silver		Bronze	
4 × 400 metres relay	Colombia; Raúl Mena; Angie Melisa Arévalo; Jennifer Padilla; Nicolás Salinas	3:21.38	Argentina; Leandro Paris; María Ayelén Diogo; Noelia Martínez; Elián Larregina	3:23.77	Ecuador; Anderson Colorado; Virginia Villalba; Evelyn Mercado; Alan Minda	3:27.97

== Medal table ==
* Host nation (Ecuador)

Rank	Nation	Gold	Silver	Bronze	Total
1	Brazil	26	12	11	49
2	Colombia	8	12	3	23
3	Venezuela	4	2	3	9
4	Ecuador*	3	5	9	17
5	Chile	2	5	1	8
6	Argentina	1	4	5	10
7	Uruguay	1	3	3	7
8	Guyana	0	1	4	5
9	Peru	0	1	3	4
10	Bolivia	0	0	1	1
10	Panama	0	0	1	1
10	Suriname	0	0	1	1
Totals (12 entries)		45	45	45	135

== Points table ==
After 2 days of competition

Rank	Nation	Men	Women	Total
1	Brazil	167	172	339
2	Colombia	85	94	179
3	Ecuador	47	55	102
4	Argentina	64	30	94
5	Venezuela	41	40	81
6	Chile	31	22	53
7	Peru	9	25	34
8	Uruguay	20	9	29
9	Guyana	10	8	18
10	Bolivia	2	8	10
11	Panama	2	4	6
12	Suriname	4	0	4
13	Puerto Rico	0	1	0
14	Dominican Republic	0	0	0
14	Paraguay	0	0	0

== Participation ==
All 13 member federations of CONSUDATLE participated at the championships. Dominican Republic and Puerto Rico participated as guests.

- Argentina (47)
- Bolivia (14)
- Brazil (78)
- Chile (31)
- Colombia (60)
- Dominican Republic (2)
- Ecuador (64)
- Guyana (12)
- Panama (6)
- Paraguay (3)
- Peru (23)
- Puerto Rico (1)
- Suriname (1)
- Uruguay (15)
- Venezuela (10)
