= Santiago Catrofe =

Uruguayan athlete

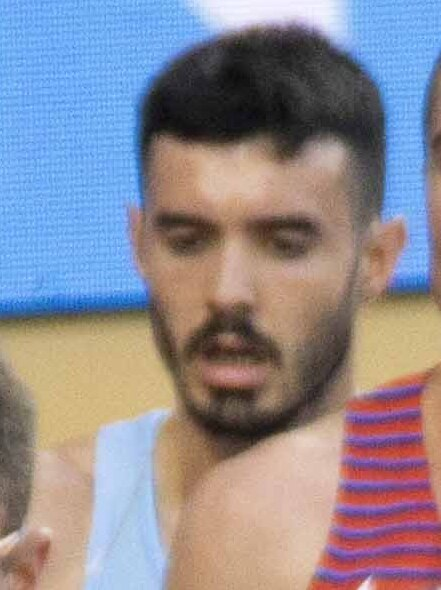
- Santiago Catrofe in 2023

Personal information
- Nationality: Montevideo Uruguayan
- Born: 13 February 1999 (age 27)

Sport
- Sport: Athletics
- Events: 800 metres; 1500 metres; Mile; 2000 metres; 3000 metres; 2 mile; 5000 metres; 5K; 10K; Half marathon

Achievements and titles
- Personal bests: Outdoor; 800 m: 1:54.37 (Miramas 2020); 1000 m: 2:23.01 (Olot 2020) NR; 1500 m: 3:35.82 (Nice 2021); Mile: 3:55.51 (Cork 2025) NR; 2000 m: 5:08.49 (Olot 2020) NR; 3000 m: 7:29.72 (Shanghai 2026) AR; 2 mile: 8:18.09 (Eugene 2026) AR; 5000 m: 12:59.26 (Paris 2025) AR; 5K: 12:57 (Lille 2025) AR; 10K: 27:16 (Valencia 2025) AR; Half marathon: 1:00:21 (Marugame 2026) NR; Indoor; 800 m: 1:54.37 (Miramas 2020); 1500 m: 3:42.94 (Sabadell 2020); 3000 m: 7:50.03 (Sabadell 2022)
Medal record
Men's athletics
Representing Uruguay
South American Games
Gold medal – first place	2022 Asunción	5000 m
Gold medal – first place	2026 Santa Fe	10,000 m
Silver medal – second place	2022 Asunción	1500 m
South American Championships
Bronze medal – third place	2021 Guayaquil	1500 m
South American Indoor Championships
Silver medal – second place	2020 Cochabamba	1500 m
Junior Pan American Games
Silver medal – second place	2021 Cali-Valle	1500 m

Santiago Catrofe (born 13 February 1999) is a Uruguayan athlete who competes in cross country running and track and field. He is a multiple Uruguayan national record holder and national champion.

== Early life ==
Having moved to Girona, Spain with his family, he has lived in Catalonia since the age of 4 years old. He was competing internationally in the colours of Uruguay at the 2018 under-23 South American Championships, in which he came fourth in the 1500m.

== Career ==
In May 2019 Catrofe finished fourth in the 1500m at the 2019 South American Championships. In Barcelona, in July 2019 Catrofe broke the 30-year old national 1500m record of Ricardo Vera. Vera was in the stands to see his mark of 3:43.47, which he set in 1989 in Seville, being broken by Catrofe running 3:42.73. Catrofe finished in fourth place at both the 2019 Pan America Games 1500m race in Lima in August 2019.

Catrofe won the bronze medal at the 2021 South American Championships in Athletics 1500m race, running 3.38:67 to finish behind Thiago André, and Federico Bruno. On 31 December 2021 he broke the national 5000m record on the road. In May 2022, he then twice broke the national 5000m record on the track, lowering it first in Nerja, Spain and then on the 22 May 2022 in at the Stadio Olimpico Carlo Zecchini, in Grosseto, Italy to 13:26.78.

On 3 June 2022 at the BoXX United Manchester World Athletics Continental Tour event, Catrofe set a new meet record by winning the 1500m race in a time of 3:40.58. Catrofe qualified for the World Athletics Championships 1500m in Eugene, Oregon, based on his ranking as the 44th out of 45 entrants. However, he far exceeded those expectations qualifying seventh fastest for the semi-finals before finishing 10th in his semi-final and 20th fastest overall.

He competed in the 5000 metres at the 2024 Summer Olympics in Paris in August 2024.

In March 2025, he finished second at the Lille 5 km road race in a South American record of 12:57. He was runner up to Selemon Barega at the Great Manchester Run in England on 18 May 2025. He lowered his South American area record for the 5000 metres to 12:59.26 at the 2025 Meeting de Paris. He had a top-ten finish in Monaco at the 2025 Herculis. In September 2025, he competed over 5000 metres at the 2025 World Championships in Tokyo, Japan, without advancing to the final.

In May 2026, Catrofe set a South American record of 7:29.72 for the 3000 metres at the 2026 Shanghai Diamond League and also had a top-ten finish in the 5000 m at the 2026 Xiamen Diamond League. He was runner up to Selemon Barega for the second consecutive year at the Great Manchester Run in England on 31 May 2026, running 27:39. In September, he won the 10,000 metres gold medal at the 2026 South American Games.
