= List of Ecuadorian records in athletics =

The following are the national records in athletics in Ecuador maintained by Ecuador's national athletics federation: Federación Ecuatoriana de Atletismo (FEA).

== Outdoor ==
Key to tables: Awaiting ratification Record not kept by FEA Not ratified or later rescinded by FEA

=== Men ===
Event	Record	Athlete	Date	Meet	Place	Ref.
100 m	10.09 A (+2.0 m/s)	Álex Quiñónez	25 May 2013	Grand Prix Ximena Restrepo	Medellín, Colombia	
100 m	10.09 A (−0.7 m/s)	Álex Quiñónez	6 June 2018	South American Games	Cochabamba, Bolivia	
150 m (straight)	15.90 (+1.4 m/s)	Álex Quiñónez	31 March 2013	Mano a Mano Challenge	Rio de Janeiro, Brazil	
200 m	19.87 (−0.1 m/s)	Álex Quiñónez	5 July 2019	Athletissima	Lausanne, Switzerland	
400 m	45.94 A (Note: ratified by FEA but not recognized by World Athletics)	Alan Minda	17 August 2024	Ecuadorian U23 Championships	Quito, Ecuador	
400 m	46.28 (Note: recognized by World Athletics)	Álex Quiñónez	30 June 2019	Meeting de Sao Joao	Braga, Portugal	
800 m	1:46.55	Bayron Piedra	25 May 2008		Belém, Brazil	
1500 m	3:37.88	Bayron Piedra	25 July 2007	Pan American Games	Rio de Janeiro, Brazil	
3000 m	7:47.06	Bayron Piedra	19 May 2010	GP Caixa Governo do Pará	Belém, Brazil	
5000 m	13:23.72	Bayron Piedra	22 July 2012		Ninove, Belgium	
10,000 m	27:32.59	Bayron Piedra	1 May 2011	Payton Jordan Cardinal Invitational	Palo Alto, United States	
10 km (road)	28:08	Rolando Vera	20 May 1990		San Diego, United States	
15 km (road)	42:44	Rolando Vera	18 June 1989		Portland, United States	
20 km (road)	1:00:43	Rolando Vera	25 May 1996		Wheeling, United States	
Half marathon	1:01:36	Rolando Vera	24 September 1994	World Half Marathon Championships	Oslo, Norway	
25 km (road)	1:15:02+	Silvio Guerra	4 March 2001		Lake Biwa, Japan	
Marathon	2:09:49	Silvio Guerra	19 October 1997	Chicago Marathon	Chicago, United States	
110 m hurdles	13.39 (−0.2 m/s)	Marcos Herrera	17 June 2026	Meeting International de Montreuil	Montreuil, France	
400 m hurdles	49.76	Emerson Alejandro Chala	28 November 2013 (Note: by World Athletics source; 29 October 2013 by federation source)		Trujillo, Peru	
3000 m steeplechase	8:48.50	Pablo Ramirez	5 April 1997	South American Championships	Mar del Plata, Argentina	
High jump	2.30 m	Diego Ferrin	27 October 2011	Pan American Games	Guadalajara, Mexico	
Pole vault	5.55 m	José Rodolfo Pacho	26 June 2019	Bestseller Goleniów Athletics Park	Goleniów, Poland	
Long jump	8.16 m A (±0.0 m/s)	Hugo Chila	23 November 2009	Bolivarian Games	Sucre, Bolivia	
Triple jump	17.03 m A (+0.3 m/s)	Hugo Chila	25 November 2009	Bolivarian Games	Sucre, Bolivia	
Shot put	17.76 m	Santiago Espin	8 April 2016		Santiago, Chile	
Discus throw	69.60 m	Juan Caicedo	22 July 2020		Lovelhe, Portugal	
Hammer throw	62.82 m A	Guillermo Braulío	2 September 2012 (Note: by World Athletics source; 1 September 2012 by federation source)		Cuenca, Ecuador	
Javelin throw	74.68 m A	José Escobar	15 March 2015		Cuenca, Ecuador	
Decathlon	8004 pts	Andy Preciado	30–31 May 2021	South American Championships	Guayaquil, Ecuador	
Decathlon	100m (wind) / Long jump (wind) / Shot put / High jump / 400m / 110m H (wind) / Discus / Pole vault / Javelin / 1500m; 10.95 (±0.0 m/s) / 6.87 m (+1.0 m/s) / 14.16 m / 2.07 m / 51.28 / 14.23 (+0.9 m/s) / 49.88 m / 4.50 m / 61.74 m / 4:45.03					
10,000 m walk (track)	38:30.91	David Hurtado	29 June 2024	Colombian Championships	Cali, Colombia	
20,000 m walk (track)	1:20:23.8 h	Andrés Chocho	5 June 2011	South American Championships	Buenos Aires, Argentina	
20 km walk (road)	1:17:21	Jefferson Pérez	23 August 2003	World Championships	Paris, France	
Half marathon walk	1:22:38 (Note: The accurate stopped time is 1:22:37.1)	David Hurtado	23 September 2026	South American Games	Santa Fe, Argentina	
35 km walk (road)	2:24:34	Brian Pintado	24 August 2023	World Championships	Budapest, Hungary	
Marathon walk	3:05:57	David Hurtado	12 April 2026	World Team Championships	Brasília, Brazil	
50 km walk (road)	3:42:57 A	Andrés Chocho	6 March 2016	IAAF Race Walking Challenge	Ciudad Juarez, Mexico	
4 × 100 m relay	39.62	Ecuador; Luis Morán; Jhon Valencia; Franklin Nazareno; Álex Quiñónez	28 November 2013 (Note: by World Athletics source; 29 October 2013 by federation source)		Trujillo, Peru	
4 × 200 m relay	1:24.89	Ecuador; Álex Quiñónez; Anderson Marquínez; Steeven Salas; Katriel Angulo	2 May 2021	World Relays	Chorzów, Poland	
4 × 400 m relay	3:06.07	Ecuador; Katriel Angulo; Anderson Marquínez; Ian Andrey Pata; Francisco Tejeda	5 December 2025	Bolivarian Games	Lima, Peru	

=== Women ===
Event	Record	Athlete	Date	Meet	Place	Ref.
100 m	10.99 (+0.9 m/s)	Ángela Tenorio	22 July 2015	Pan American Games	Toronto, Canada	
150 m (straight)	17.01 (+0.6 m/s)	Ángela Tenorio	16 June 2019	Adidas Boost Boston Games	Boston, United States	
200 m	22.74 (−0.1 m/s) (Note: by official result source; +0.5 m/s by FEA source, a typo)	Anahí Suárez	19 July 2022	World Championships	Eugene, United States	
400 m	51.53	Nicole Caicedo	29 July 2023	South American Championships	São Paulo, Brazil	
800 m	2:04.00	Andrea Calderón	23 November 2017 (Note: by World Athletics source;24 October 2017 by federation source)		Santa Marta, Argentina	
1500 m	4:16.30	Carmen Alder	2 April 2022	Stanford Invitational	Palo Alto, United States	
Mile	4:37.35	Lily Alder	8 June 2025	Brooks PR Invitational	Renton, United States	
3000 m	9:18.1 h	Martha Tenorio	3 June 1992		Victoria, Canada	
5000 m	15:37.55	Andrea Paola Bonilla	4 April 2025	Stanford Invitational	Palo Alto, United States	
10,000 m	32:42.25	Martha Tenorio	30 May 1992		Vancouver, Canada	
10,000 m	32:29.50	Mary Zeneida Granja	22 September 2026	South American Games	Santa Fe, Argentina	
10 km (road)	32:40	Katerine Tisalema	19 March 2022		Laredo, Spain	
15 km (road)	51:50	Martha Tenorio	18 June 1989		Portland, United States	
20 km (road)	1:09:09+	Silvia Ortiz	3 December 2023	Valencia Marathon	Valencia, Spain	
Half marathon	1:11:23 (Note: by World Athletics source; 1:11:20 by FEA source; probably a typo)	Rosa Chacha	21 August 2022	South American Half Marathon Championships	Buenos Aires, Argentina	
25 km (road)	1:26:27+	Silvia Ortiz	3 December 2023	Valencia Marathon	Valencia, Spain	
30 km (road)	1:43:32+	Silvia Ortiz	3 December 2023	Valencia Marathon	Valencia, Spain	
Marathon	2:24:50	Silvia Ortiz	3 December 2023	Valencia Marathon	Valencia, Spain	
100 m hurdles	12.49 (+1.3 m/s)	Maribel Caicedo	23 May 2024	NCAA Division I West First Rounds	Fayetteville, United States	
400 m hurdles	56.50	Lucy Jaramillo	24 June 2012		Cali, Colombia	
3000 m steeplechase	10:06.74	Katherine Tisalema	10 August 2019	Pan American Games	Lima, Peru	
High jump	1.83 m	Joicce Micolta	30 May 2021	South American Championships	Guayaquil, Ecuador	
Pole vault	3.90 m A	Ana Quiñonez	13 November 2016	South American U18 Championships	Concordia, Argentina	
Long jump	6.67 m (+1.8 m/s)	Yuliana Angulo	16 May 2021		Leverkusen, Germany	
Triple jump	14.05 m (±0.0 m/s)	Liuba Zaldivar	1 May 2019	Grand Prix Internacional "Ximena Restrepo"	Medellín, Colombia	
Triple jump	14.05 m (+0.7 m/s)	Liuba Zaldivar	18 May 2019	Gran Premio Caterine Ibargüen	Barranquilla, Colombia	
Shot put	16.75 m	Belsy Quiñónez	4 December 2025	Bolivarian Games	Lima, Peru	
Discus throw	53.02 m	Merari Herrera	16 October 2021	South American U23 Championships	Guayaquil, Ecuador	
Hammer throw	67.32 m	Valeria Chiliquinga	4 May 2019		Vila Nova de Cerveira, Portugal	
Javelin throw	65.12 m	Juleisy Angulo	20 September 2025	World Championships	Tokyo, Japan	
Heptathlon	5925 pts	Nancy Vallecilla	25–26 May 1985	Hypo-Meeting	Götzis, Austria	
Heptathlon	100m H (wind) / High jump / Shot put / 200m (wind) / Long jump (wind) / Javelin / 800m; 13.84 / 1.78 m / 11.32 m / 24.64 / 6.05 m / 37.18 m / 2:10.51					
5000 m walk (track)	22:51.10	Miriam Ramón	12 August 1990		Plovdiv, Bulgaria	
5 km walk (road)	21:16	Glenda Morejón	15 April 2017	National Racewalking Championships	Sucúa, Ecuador	
10,000 m walk (track)	44:19.40	Glenda Morejón	10 July 2018	World U20 Championships	Tampere, Finland	
10,000 m walk (track)	44:12.75	Glenda Morejón	25 August 2018	Ibero-American Championships	Trujillo, Peru	
10 km walk (road)	43:04	Glenda Morejón	9 March 2019	Ecuadorian Race Walking Championships	Sucúa, Ecuador	
10 km walk (road)	42:55+	Glenda Morejón	8 June 2019	Gran Premio Cantones de Marcha	A Coruña, Spain	
20,000 m walk (track)	1:29:24.61	Glenda Morejón	29 May 2021	South American Championships	Guayaquil, Ecuador	
20 km walk (road)	1:25:29	Glenda Morejón	8 June 2019	Gran Premio Cantones de Marcha	A Coruña, Spain	
30 km walk (road)	2:24:33	Paola Pérez	22 October 2017		Hauppauge, United States	
35 km walk (road)	2:42:44	Paula Milena Torres	13 September 2025	World Championships	Tokyo, Japan	
Marathon walk	3:24:37	Paula Milena Torres	12 April 2026	World Team Championships	Brasília, Brazil	
50 km walk (road)	4:11:12	Johana Ordóñez	11 August 2019	Pan American Games	Lima, Peru	
4 × 100 m relay	43.47	Ecuador; Ángela Tenorio; Nicole Caicedo; Aimara Nazareno; Anahí Suárez	5 May 2024	World Relays	Nassau, Bahamas	
4 × 200 m relay	1:35.91	Ecuador; Virginia Villalba; Anahí Suárez; Marizol Landázuri; Ángela Tenorio	12 May 2019	IAAF World Relays	Yokohama, Japan	
4 × 400 m relay	3:37.84	Ecuador; Evelin Mercado; Nicole Caicedo; Virginia Villalba; Anahi Suarez	5 July 2022	Bolivarian Games	Valledupar, Colombia	

=== Mixed ===
Event	Record	Athlete	Date	Meet	Place	Ref.
4 × 100 m relay	41.52	Ecuador; Nicole Caicedo; Anahí Suárez; Katriel Angulo; Anderson Marquínez	1 December 2025	Bolivarian Games	Lima, Peru	
4 × 400 m relay	3:18.33	Ecuador; Dusthin Morquecho; Génesis Nicole Cañola; Steven Mateus Mendez; Nicole Caicedo	24 September 2026	South American Games	Santa Fe, Argentina	

== Indoor ==
=== Men ===
Event	Record	Athlete	Date	Meet	Place	Ref.
60 m	6.66	Álex Quiñónez	8 February 2019	Villa de Madrid Indoor Meeting	Madrid, Spain	
200 m	21.12	Álex Quiñónez	2 February 2019	Copa del Rey	San Sebastián, Spain	
400 m	56.51	Meteo Vasconez	31 January 2016		Orléans, France	
800 m	1:59.33	Cristián Matute	4 February 2006		Lynchburg, United States	
1500 m						
3000 m	8:54.73	Jefferson Montserrat	5 January 2008		Padua, Italy	
60 m hurdles	7.57 A	Marcos Herrera	1 March 2026	South American Championships	Cochabamba, Bolivia	
60 m hurdles	7.56	Jackson Quiñónez	26 February 2006		San Sebastián, Spain	
High jump	2.25 m	Diego Ferrin	11 February 2011	Meeting National	Eaubonne, France	
Pole vault						
Long jump						
Triple jump	14.77 m	José Quinaliza	6 March 1987	World Championships	Indianapolis, United States	
Shot put						
Heptathlon						
Heptathlon	60m / Long jump / Shot put / High jump / 60m H / Pole vault / 1000m					
5000 m walk	20:19.91	Jefferson Pérez	9 March 1991	World Championships	Seville, Spain	
4 × 400 m relay						

=== Women ===
Event	Record	Athlete	Date	Meet	Place	Ref.
60 m	7.21	Ángela Tenorio	19 March 2016	World Championships	Portland, United States	
200 m						
400 m	55.28	Paola Sanchez	8 February 2009		Vilafranca, Spain	
800 m	2:15.93	Maria Elena Calle	23 January 1999		Princess Anne, United States	
800 m	2:12.62 A OT	Janeth Caizalitin	25 February 1995		Colorado Springs, United States	
1500 m						
3000 m	9:13.68	Janeth Alder	9 March 1996		Indianapolis, United States	
5000 m	16:12.58	María Elena Calle	10 March 2000	NCAA Division I Championships	Fayetteville, United States	
60 m hurdles	8.26	Nancy Vallecilla	7 February 1988	BW-Bank Meeting	Karlsruhe, West Germany	
High jump						
Pole vault						
Long jump						
Triple jump	13.57 m (round 1)	Liuva Zaidívar	29 February 2020		Puertollano, Spain	
Triple jump	13.57 m (round 4)	Liuva Zaidívar	29 February 2020		Puertollano, Spain	
Shot put						
Pentathlon						
Pentathlon	60m H / High jump / Shot put / Long jump / 800m					
3000 m walk	13:24.95	Miriam Ramón	9 March 1991	World Championships	Seville, Spain	
4 × 400 m relay						
