= 2014 Ibero-American Championships in Athletics =

XVI Ibero-American Championships in Athletics
- Dates: August 1–3
- Host city: São Paulo, Brazil
- Venue: Estádio Ícaro de Castro Melo
- Level: Senior
- Events: 44 (22 men, 22 women)
- Participation: 294 athletes from 22 nations

The 16th Ibero-American Championships in Athletics were held at the Estádio Ícaro de Castro Melo in São Paulo, Brazil, between August 1–3, 2014.

A total of 44 events were contested, 22 by men and 22 by women.

A detailed report on the event and an appraisal of the results was given.

== Medal summary ==
The results and medal winners were published.

=== Men ===
Event	Gold		Silver		Bronze	
100 metres (wind: +0.6 m/s)	Andy Martínez; Peru	10.30 NR	Jorge Vides; Brazil	10.31	Isidro Montoya; Colombia	10.32
200 metres (wind: +0.7 m/s)	Jorge Vides; Brazil	20.42	Bernardo Baloyes; Colombia	20.43 NR	Cruz Rolando Palacios; Honduras	20.60
400 metres	Anderson Henriques; Brazil	45.40	Pedro de Oliveira; Brazil	45.73	Nery Brenes; Costa Rica	45.97
800 metres	Rafith Rodríguez; Colombia	1:44.77 CR	Thiago André; Brazil	1:45.99	Lucirio Antonio Garrido; Venezuela	1:46.60
1500 metres	Marvin Blanco; Venezuela	3:43.88	Álvaro Rodríguez; Spain	3:43.91	Carlos Díaz; Chile	3:44.74
3000 metres	Juan Luis Barrios; Mexico	7:59.50	Bayron Piedra; Ecuador	7:59.55	Carlos dos Santos; Brazil	8:01.19
5000 metres	Bayron Piedra; Ecuador	13:50.20	Altobeli da Silva; Brazil	13:54.65	Iván Fernández; Spain	13:59.61
3000 metres steeplechase	Marvin Blanco; Venezuela	8:35.87	Fernando Carro; Spain	8:39.66	Tomás Tajadura; Spain	8:40.32
110 metres hurdles (wind: -0.3 m/s)	Jorge McFarlane; Peru	13.53 NR	Javier McFarlane; Peru	13.57	Jonatha Mendes; Brazil	13.70
400 metres hurdles	Andrés Silva; Uruguay	48.65 CR, NR	Eric Alejandro; Puerto Rico	49.07	Mahau Suguimati; Brazil	49.99
High jump	Edgar Rivera; Mexico	2.28	Luis Joel Castro; Puerto Rico	2.26 =NR	Guilherme Cobbo; Brazil	2.24
Pole vault	Germán Chiaraviglio; Argentina; José Rodolfo Pacho; Ecuador	5.20; 5.20 NR			João Gabriel Sousa; Brazil	5.20
Long jump	Luis Alberto Rivera; Mexico	8.24 (wind: +0.1 m/s)	Higor Alves; Brazil	8.00 (wind: +2.0 m/s)	Luis Méliz; Spain	7.76 (wind: -1.4 m/s)
Triple jump	Jonathan Henrique Silva; Brazil	16.84 (wind: +1.3 m/s)	Kauam Bento; Brazil	16.79 (wind: +1.5 m/s)	Alberto Álvarez; Mexico	16.31 (wind: +0.7 m/s)
Shot put	Germán Lauro; Argentina	20.14	Darlan Romani; Brazil	19.64	Stephen Sáenz; Mexico	18.62
Discus throw	Germán Lauro; Argentina	61.62	Felipe Lorenzon; Brazil	59.85	Ronald Julião; Brazil	59.75
Hammer throw	Wagner Domingos; Brazil	74.12 NR	Allan Wolski; Brazil	70.81	Dário Manso; Portugal	69.37
Javelin throw	Dayron Márquez; Colombia	78.80	Júlio César de Oliveira; Brazil	78.04	Víctor Fatecha; Paraguay	74.73
Decathlon	Felipe dos Santos; Brazil	7810	Jorge Ureña; Spain	7644	Guillermo Ruggeri; Argentina	7274
20,000 metres track walk	Iván Garrido; Colombia	1:22:13.74	Marc Tur; Spain	1:23:22.19	Yerko Araya; Chile	1:23:34.68
4 × 100 metres relay	Brazil; Luís Gabriel Silva; Jefferson Lucindo; Aldemir da Silva Junior; Jorge Vides	39.35	Dominican Republic; Enmanuel Brioso; Carlos Oroza; Stanley del Carmen; Yoandry Andújar	39.92	Angola; Mauro Gaspar; Osvaldo Alexandre; Prisca Baltazar; Kevin de Oliveira	41.12
4 × 400 metres relay	Dominican Republic; Winder Cuevas; Yon Soriano; Juander Santos; Luguelín Santos	3:02.73	Brazil; Pedro de Oliveira; Wagner Cardoso; Hederson Estefani; Anderson Henriques	3:02.80		

=== Women ===
Event	Gold		Silver		Bronze	
100 metres (wind: +0.0 m/s)	Ana Cláudia Lemos Silva; Brazil	11.13 CR	Eliecith Palacios; Colombia	11.40	Franciela Krasucki Davide; Brazil	11.43
200 metres (wind: +0.2 m/s)	Franciela Krasucki Davide; Brazil	23.41	Narcisa Landázuri; Ecuador	23.60	Vanusa dos Santos; Brazil	23.64
400 metres	Geisa Coutinho; Brazil	51.76	Jennifer Padilla; Colombia	52.72	Joelma Sousa; Brazil	53.04
800 metres	Gabriela Medina; Mexico	2:03.17	Cristina Guevara; Mexico	2:03.22	Marta Pen; Portugal	2:05.18
1500 metres	Muriel Coneo; Colombia	4:14.42	Cristina Guevara; Mexico	4:16.09	Juliana Paula dos Santos; Brazil	4:16.48
3000 metres	Juliana Paula dos Santos; Brazil	9:19.80	Muriel Coneo; Colombia	9:22.10	Eliona Delgado; Peru	9:23.10
5000 metres	Inés Melchor; Peru	15:58.85	Cruz Nonata da Silva; Brazil	16:02.40	Catarina Ribeiro; Portugal	16:05.45
3000 metres steeplechase	María Mancebo; Dominican Republic	9:45.84	Zulema Arenas; Peru	9:53.42 NR, AJR	Beverly Ramos; Puerto Rico	10:03.12
100 metres hurdles (wind: +0.1 m/s)	LaVonne Idlette; Dominican Republic	12.99	Yveth Lewis; Panama	13.05	Lina Flórez; Colombia	13.18
400 metres hurdles	Zudikey Rodríguez; Mexico	56.64	Déborah Rodríguez; Uruguay	57.56	Sharolyn Scott; Costa Rica	58.10
High jump	Mónica de Freitas; Brazil	1.82	Betsabé Páez; Argentina	1.75	Tamara Alexandrino de Sousa; Brazil	1.75
Pole vault	Patrícia dos Santos; Brazil	4.10	Karla Rosa da Silva; Brazil	4.10	Valeria Chiaraviglio; Argentina	4.10
Long jump	Juliet Itoya; Spain	6.64 (wind: +0.0 m/s)	Yuliana Angulo; Ecuador	6.33 (wind: -0.6 m/s) NR	Eliane Martins; Brazil	6.31 (wind: +1.1 m/s)
Triple jump	Yosiris Urrutia; Colombia	14.41 (wind: +1.2 m/s)	Gisele de Oliveira; Brazil	13.71 (wind: +0.7 m/s)	Tânia da Silva; Brazil	13.47 (wind: +1.3 m/s)
Shot put	Natalia Ducó; Chile	17.53	Sandra Lemos; Colombia	17.10	Keely Medeiros; Brazil	16.95
Discus throw	Karen Gallardo; Chile	59.66	Fernanda Raquel Borges Martins; Brazil	59.08	Andressa de Morais; Brazil	57.82
Hammer throw	Jennifer Dahlgren; Argentina	66.84	Johana Moreno; Colombia	66.01	Zuleima Mina; Ecuador	62.84
Javelin throw	Jucilene de Lima; Brazil	61.71	Laila Ferrer e Silva; Brazil	58.12	Flor Ruiz; Colombia	57.31
Heptathlon	Vanessa Spinola; Brazil	5722	Alysbeth Felix; Puerto Rico	5578 NR	Lecabela Quaresma; Portugal	5574
10,000 metres track walk	Júlia Takács; Spain	43:10.95 CR	Erica de Sena; Brazil	43:41.30 SA, NR	Kimberly García; Peru	43:57.44
4 × 100 metres relay	Brazil; Vanusa dos Santos; Ana Cláudia Lemos Silva; Franciela Krasucki Davide; Rosângela Santos	42.92 CR	Dominican Republic; LaVonne Idlette; Fany Chalas; Margarita Manzueta; Hiyadilis Melo	46.58		
4 × 400 metres relay	Brazil; Geisa Coutinho; Bárbara de Oliveira; Joelma Sousa; Jailma de Lima	3:29.66				

== Medal table (unofficial) ==
A medal table was published.

* Host nation (Brazil)

Rank	Nation	Gold	Silver	Bronze	Total
1	Brazil*	16	17	15	48
2	Colombia	5	6	3	14
3	Mexico	5	2	2	9
4	Argentina	4	1	2	7
5	Peru	3	2	2	7
6	Dominican Republic	3	2	0	5
7	Spain	2	4	3	9
8	Ecuador	2	3	1	6
9	Chile	2	0	2	4
10	Venezuela	2	0	1	3
11	Uruguay	1	1	0	2
12	Puerto Rico	0	3	1	4
13	Panama	0	1	0	1
14	Portugal	0	0	4	4
15	Costa Rica	0	0	2	2
16	Angola	0	0	1	1
16	Honduras	0	0	1	1
16	Paraguay	0	0	1	1
Totals (18 entries)		45	42	41	128

== Participation ==
According to an unofficial count, 294 athletes from 22 countries participated. Although initially announced, athletes from Cape Verde and from Mozambique did not show.

- Angola (5)
- Argentina (20)
- Bolivia (3)
- Brazil (75)
- Chile (16)
- Colombia (28)
- Costa Rica (10)
- Cuba (2)
- Dominican Republic (20)
- Ecuador (11)
- El Salvador (2)
- Guinea-Bissau (1)
- Honduras (3)
- Mexico (18)
- Panama (8)
- Paraguay (8)
- Peru (15)
- Portugal (9)
- Puerto Rico (8)
- Spain (20)
- Uruguay (7)
- Venezuela (5)
