= Jeremy Bascom =

Guyanese sprinter

Personal information
- Born: 21 March 1981 (age 45) Linden, Guyana
- Height: 1.70 m (5 ft 7 in)
- Weight: 73 kg (161 lb)

Sport
- Country: Guyana
- Sport: Athletics
- Event: Sprint
- Updated on 12 December 2014

Jeremy Bascom (born 21 March 1981) is a Guyanese sprinter. At the 2012 Summer Olympics, he competed in the Men's 100 metres, where he equaled the Guyanese national record in the distance.

Born in Linden, Guyana, he has lived in the United States of America since 1997, where he attended Long Island University. He also represented Guyana at the 2010 Commonwealth Games in New Delhi, India and the 2014 Commonwealth Games in Glasgow, United Kingdom.

== Personal bests ==
- 100 m: 10.19 s (wind: +0.0 m/s) – Omaha, United States, 6 July 2012
- 200 m: 21.74 s (wind: +1.0 m/s) – Emmitsburg, United States, 7 May 2005

== Achievements ==
| Year | Competition | Venue | Position | Event | Notes |
Representing the Guyana
| 2007 | South American Championships | São Paulo, Brazil | 10th (h) | 100 m | 10.85 (wind: -0.8 m/s) |
| 2007 | South American Championships | São Paulo, Brazil | 11th (h) | 200 m | 21.92 (wind: +1.3 m/s) |
| 2008 | Central American and Caribbean Championships | Cali, Colombia | 13th (sf) | 100 m | 10.47 (wind: +0.7 m/s) |
| 2008 | Central American and Caribbean Championships | Cali, Colombia | 29th (h) | 200 m | 22.13 w (wind: +2.2 m/s) |
| 2010 | Commonwealth Games | Delhi, India | 8th (qf) | 100 m | 10.63 (wind: +0.5 m/s) |
| 2012 | World Indoor Championships | Istanbul, Turkey | 15th (sf) | 60 m | 6.77 |
| 2012 | Olympic Games | London, United Kingdom | 6th (qf) | 100 m | 10.31 (wind: +1.3 m/s) |
| 2013 | South American Championships | Cartagena, Colombia | 5th | 100 m | 10.43 (wind: +1.3 m/s) |
| 2014 | Commonwealth Games | Glasgow, United Kingdom | 5th (h) | 100 m | 10.58 (wind: -0.8 m/s) |
| 2014 | Commonwealth Games | Glasgow, United Kingdom | – | 4 × 100 m relay | DQ |
| 2014 | Central American and Caribbean Games | Xalapa, Mexico | 8th (h) | 100 m | 10.92 A (wind: +0.4 m/s) |
| 2014 | Central American and Caribbean Games | Xalapa, Mexico | 5th | 4 × 100 m relay | 39.74 A |
| 2021 | South American Championships | Guayaquil, Ecuador | 12th (h) | 100 m | 10.77 |
| 2021 | South American Championships | Guayaquil, Ecuador | 3rd | 4 × 100 m relay | 40.02 |
