= Yohan Chaverra =

Colombian athlete (born 1995)

Personal information
- Full name: Yohan Camilo Chaverra Córdoba
- Nationality: Colombian
- Born: 21 March 1995 (age 31) Turbo, Colombia

Sport
- Country: Colombia
- Sport: Athletics
- Events: 110 metres hurdles; High jump

Achievements and titles
- Personal bests: 110 metres hurdles: 13.42 (2025); High jump: 2.18 m (2013)
Medal record
Representing Colombia
Men's athletics
South American Championships
Silver medal – second place	2019 Lima	110 m hurdles
Silver medal – second place	2021 Guayaquil	110 m hurdles
Bolivarian Games
Silver medal – second place	2025 Lima-Ayacucho	110 m hurdles
South American U20 Championships
Gold medal – first place	2013 Resistencia	High jump
South U18 American Championships
Gold medal – first place	2012 Mendoza	High jump

Yohan Camilo Chaverra Córdoba (born 21 March 1995, in Turbo) is a Colombian hurdler.

He is also a high jumper. He established his personal best on 110 m hs to 13.42 in São Paulo, in August 2025. He qualified for the semifinals at the 2019 World Athletics Championships in Doha.
