= Mahau Suguimati =

Brazilian hurdler (born 1984)

Personal information
- Full name: Mahau Camargo Suguimati
- Nationality: Brazil
- Born: 13 November 1984 (age 41) São Miguel do Araguaia, Brazil
- Height: 1.84 m (6 ft 1/2 in)
- Weight: 77 kg (170 lb)

Sport
- Sport: Athletics
- Event: 400 metres hurdles
- Club: Atlético Clube Paranavaí (BRA)

Achievements and titles
- Personal best: 400 m hurdles: 48.67 s (2009)
Medal record
Men's athletics
Representing Brazil
South American Championships
Gold medal – first place	2013 Cartagena	400 m hurdles
Ibero-American Championships
Gold medal – first place	2008 Iquique	400 m hurdles

Mahau Camargo Suguimati (born November 13, 1984) is a Brazilian track hurdler of Japanese ancestry. Since the age of eight, Suguimati had lived and studied for sixteen years in Niiza, Japan. Suguimati also attended schools around the prefecture, where he discovered his natural ability and talent of running and hurdling, under his personal coach and trainer Atsushi Hishinuma. He made his international debut, and represented his birth nation Brazil at the 2007 Pan American Games in Rio de Janeiro, where he finished seventh in the final of the 400 m hurdles, with his personal best time of 49.63 seconds.

Suguimati qualified for the 2008 Summer Olympics in Beijing, after claiming the gold medal from the Brazil Trophy Box in São Paulo, with an A-standard time of 49.15 seconds. He ran in the first heat of the men's 400 m hurdles, against six other athletes, including Bershawn Jackson of the United States, who eventually won the bronze medal in the final. He finished the race in third place by a quarter second margin (0.25) behind Jackson, and twenty-one hundredths of a second behind South Africa's Pieter de Villiers, with a time of 49.45 seconds. Suguimati qualified directly for the next round, as he secured the last mandatory place from the first heat. In the semi-final round, Suguimati, however, felt short in his bid to advance into the final round, when he placed seventh in the second heat, outside his personal best of 50.16 seconds.

At the 2011 Pan American Games in Guadalajara, Mexico, Suguimati missed out of the medal podium, when he finished fifth in the final of the men's 400 m hurdles, by two hundredths of a second faster from his first personal best, with a time of 49.61 seconds.

== Personal bests ==
- 200 m: 21.62 (wind: +1.3 m/s) – (Japan) Maebashi, 27 June 2004
- 400 m: 46.21 – (Japan) Gifu, 8 October 2012
- 400 m hurdles: 48.67 – (Japan) Niigata, 3 October 2009

== Achievements ==
Year	Competition	Venue	Position	Event	Notes
Representing the Brazil
2007	Pan American Games	Rio de Janeiro, Brazil	7th	400 m hurdles	49.63
2008	Ibero-American Championships	Iquique, Chile	1st	400 m hurdles	50.07
2008	Olympic Games	Beijing, China	15th (sf)	400 m hurdles	50.16
2009	South American Championships	Lima, Peru	4th	400 m hurdles	51.50
2009	World Championships	Berlin, Germany	24th (h)	400 m hurdles	51.05
2010	Ibero-American Championships	San Fernando, Spain	3rd	400 m hurdles	49.87
2011	South American Championships	Buenos Aires, Argentina	2nd	400 m hurdles	51.11
2011	World Championships	Daegu, South Korea	23rd (sf)	400 m hurdles	50.89
2011	Pan American Games	Guadalajara, Mexico	5th	400 m hurdles	49.61
2013	South American Championships	Cartagena, Colombia	1st	400 m hurdles	49.86
2013	World Championships	Moscow, Russia	20th (sf)	400 m hurdles	50.27
2014	South American Games	Santiago, Chile	3rd	400 m hurdles	50.47
2014	Ibero-American Championships	São Paulo, Brazil	3rd	400 m hurdles	49.99
2016	Olympic Games	Rio de Janeiro, Brazil	22nd (sf)	400 m hurdles	49.77
2019	South American Championships	Lima, Peru	5th	400 m hurdles	51.15
2019	South American Championships	Lima, Peru	2nd	4 × 400 m relay	3:04.13
2021	South American Championships	Guayaquil, Ecuador	1st	400 m hurdles	51.25
2022	Ibero-American Championships	La Nucía, Spain	7th	400 m hurdles	52.90
2022	Ibero-American Championships	La Nucía, Spain	5th	4 × 400 m relay	3:10.12
2022	World Championships	Eugene, United States	33rd (h)	400 m hurdles	52.43
