= Thiago Moura =

Brazilian high jumper (born 1995)

Personal information
- Full name: Thiago Julio Souza Alfano Moura
- Nationality: Brazil
- Born: 27 November 1995 (age 30) São Paulo, Brazil

Sport
- Sport: Athletics

Thiago Julio Souza Alfano Moura (born 27 November 1995) is a Brazilian high jumper. He competed at the 2020 Summer Olympics.

At the 2022 World Indoor Championships, he finished 5th in the High Jump, with a 2.31 mark, a new South American indoor record, the same as the silver and bronze medalists. It's also the second best Brazilian high jump mark of all time, also considering outdoor competitions.

== International competitions ==
Year	Competition	Venue	Position	Notes
Representing Brazil
2012	South American Youth Championships	Mendoza, Argentina	2nd	2.07 m
2013	Pan American Junior Championships	Medellín, Colombia	5th	2.10 m
2013	South American Junior Championships	Resistencia, Argentina	4th	2.06 m
2019	South American Championships	Lima, Peru	4th	2.10 m
2020	South American Indoor Championships	Cochabamba, Bolivia	3rd	2.19 m
2021	South American Championships	Guayaquil, Ecuador	2nd	2.23 m
2021	Olympic Games	Tokyo, Japan	21st (q)	2.21 m
2022	South American Indoor Championships	Cochabamba, Bolivia	1st	2.22 m
2022	World Indoor Championships	Belgrade, Serbia	5th	2.31 m
2022	Ibero-American Championships	La Nucía, Spain	2nd	2.26 m
2022	World Championships	Eugene, United States	18th (q)	2.25 m
2022	South American Games	Asunción, Paraguay	1st	2.19 m
2023	Pan American Games	Santiago, Chile	9th	2.18 m
2024	South American Indoor Championships	Cochabamba, Bolivia	2nd	2.15 m
2024	Ibero-American Championships	Cuiabá, Brazil	2nd	2.20 m
2025	South American Indoor Championships	Cochabamba, Bolivia	1st	2.22 m
2025	South American Championships	Mar del Plata, Argentina	1st	2.16 m
2025	World Championships	Tokyo, Japan	29th (q)	2.16 m
2026	South American Indoor Championships	Cochabamba, Bolivia	1st	2.23 m
2026	Ibero-American Championships	Lima, Peru	1st	2.19 m
2026	South American Games	Santa Fe, Argentina	3rd	2.11 m
