= Andrea Foster =

Guyanese middle-distance runner

Personal information
- Born: 12 March 1997 (age 29)

Sport
- Sport: Track and field
- Event(s): 800 m, 1500 m
- Updated on 29 August 2015

Andrea Foster (born 12 March 1997) is a Guyanese middle-distance runner competing primarily in the 800 metres. She represented her country at the 2015 World Championships in Beijing without advancing from the first round.

== Competition record ==
| Year | Competition | Venue | Position | Event | Notes |
Representing Guyana
| 2012 | CARIFTA Games (U17) | Hamilton, Bermuda | 3rd | 1500 m | 4:57.28 |
| 2012 | CARIFTA Games (U17) | Hamilton, Bermuda | 4th | 3000 m | 10:48.01 |
| 2015 | World Championships | Beijing, China | 43rd (h) | 800 m | 2:17.39 |
| 2016 | CARIFTA Games (U20) | St. George's, Grenada | 3rd | 800 m | 2:12.53 |
| 2016 | CARIFTA Games (U20) | St. George's, Grenada | 3rd | 1500 m | 4:45.53 |
| 2021 | South American Championships | Guayaquil, Ecuador | 3rd | 800 m | 2:05.93 |
| 2023 | Central American and Caribbean Games | San Salvador, El Salvador | 9th (h) | 400 m hurdles | 59.37 |

== Personal bests ==
Outdoor

- 800 metres – 2:12.53 (St. George's 2016)
- 1500 metres – 4:45.53 (St. George's 2015)
