= Micaela de Mello =

Brazilian hurdler (born 2000)

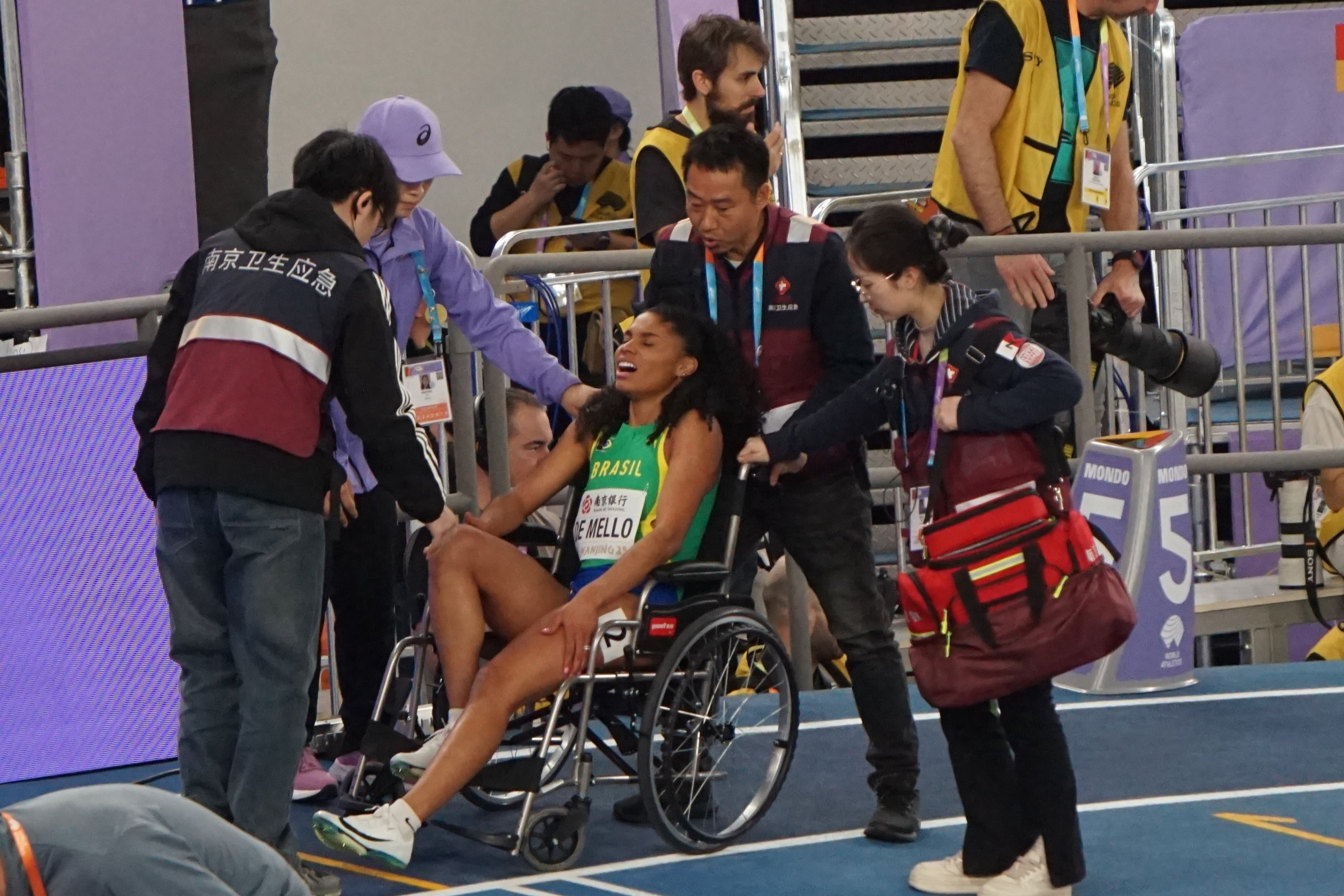
- De Mello in 2025

Personal information
- Full name: Micaela Rosa de Mello
- Nationality: Brazilian
- Born: 7 March 2000 (age 26)

Sport
- Sport: Athletics
- Event: Hurdles

Achievements and titles
- Personal bests: 60m hurdles: 8.00 (Spokane, 2025); 100m hurdles: 12.85 (Fayetteville, 2024)
Medal record
Representing Brazil
Women's athletics
Pan American Championships
Bronze medal – third place	2026 Medellín	100 m hurdles
South American Games
Silver medal – second place	2022 Asunción	100 m hurdles
Bronze medal – third place	2022 Asunción	4×100 m relay
South American Championships
Silver medal – second place	2023 São Paulo	100m hurdles
Gold medal – first place	2021 Guayaquil	4×100 m relay

Micaela Rosa de Mello (born 7 March 2000) is a Brazilian hurdler. In 2025, she became the Brazilian national record holder over 60 metres hurdles, she has also won national championship titles over 100 metres hurdles.

== Biography ==
She is from São José and is a member of UCA de São José. She was a gold medalist in the 4 x 100 metres relay at the 2021 South American Championships in Ecuador. She finished fourth in the 100 metres hurdles at the event.

She was a silver medalist in the 100 metres hurdles at the 2022 South American Games. She was a bronze medalist in the 4 x 100 metres relay at the Games. She was Brazilian national champion in 2022 in the 100 metres hurdles.

She was a silver medalist in the 100 metres hurdles at the 2023 South American Championships, although the winner, Caroline Tomaz, later received a doping suspension.

Competing for Washington State University she reached the final of the NCAA Championships in 2024. She was Brazilian national champion in 2024 in the 100 metres hurdles.

In Spokane in January 2025, she a ran the 60 metres hurdles in time of 8.02, setting a new Brazilian indoor record, six hundredths better than the previous mark of 8.08, achieved by Maíla Machado at the 2006 IAAF World Indoor Championships in Moscow. In February 2025, she lowered it to 8.00, also in Spokane. She finished fourth in the 60 metres hurdles at the 2025 NCAA Indoor Championships in a time of 8.02 seconds. She qualified for the semi-finals of the 60 metres hurdles at the 2025 World Athletics Indoor Championships in Nanjing, before suffering a fall in her semi-final. That year, she transferred to the University of Oregon.

De Mello opened her 2026 indoor season with a win in 8.13 in the 60 meters hurdles at The Spokane Sports Showcase. In June, she qualified for the 100 metres hurdles at the 2026 NCAA Outdoor Championships. That month, she won the bronze medal in the 100 metres hurdles at the inaugural 2026 Pan American Championships in Medellín.
