= Raúl Mena Pedroza =

Colombian sprinter (born 1995)

Personal information
- Full name: Raúl Hernan Mena Pedroza
- Born: 22 July 1995 (age 30) Barranquilla, Colombia
- Height: 1.84 m (6 ft 0 in)
- Weight: 64 kg (141 lb)

Sport
- Country: Colombia
- Sport: Athletics
- Events: 400 metres; 4×100 metres; 4×400 metres; Mixed relay; Long jump
Medal record
Representing Colombia
Men's athletics
Event	1st	2nd	3rd
CAC Games	0	0	1
South American Games	0	0	2
South American Championships	1	1	2
Bolivarian Games	1	0	0
South American U23 Championships	0	2	0
Total	2	3	5
Central American and Caribbean Games
Bronze medal – third place	2023 San Salvador	Mixed relay
South American Games
Bronze medal – third place	2022 Asunción	4×400 m relay
Bronze medal – third place	2022 Asunción	Mixed relay
South American Championships
Gold medal – first place	2021 Guayaquil	Mixed relay
Silver medal – second place	2021 Guayaquil	4×400 m relay
Bronze medal – third place	2019 Lima	Long jump
Bronze medal – third place	2021 Guayaquil	400 m
Bolivarian Games
Gold medal – first place	2022 Valledupar	4×400 m relay
South American U23 Championships
Silver medal – second place	2016 Lima	Long jump
Silver medal – second place	2016 Lima	4×100 m relay

Raúl Mena Pedroza (born 22 July 1995) is a Colombian athlete. He competed in the men's 4 × 400 metres relay event at the 2020 Summer Olympics.
