= Andy Preciado =

Ecuadorian athletics competitor

Personal information
- Born: 12 October 1997 (age 28) Rioverde, Ecuador

Sport
- Sport: Track and field
- Event: Decathlon
Medal record
Representing Ecuador
South American Championships
Gold medal – first place	2021 Guayaquil	Decathlon

Andy Federico Preciado Madrigal (born 12 October 1997 in Rioverde) is an Ecuadorian decathlete.

He holds the national record for decathlon since 2017 (7528 points) that he improved in 2021 to 8004 points by winning the South American Championships in Guayaquil. He scored 8004 pts, 476-point improvement on his previous record, thanks to five personal bests: 10.95 in the 100m, 51.28 in the 400m, 14.23 in the 110m hurdles, 4.50m in the pole vault and 4:45.03 for 1500 m.
