= Thiago André =

Brazilian middle-distance runner

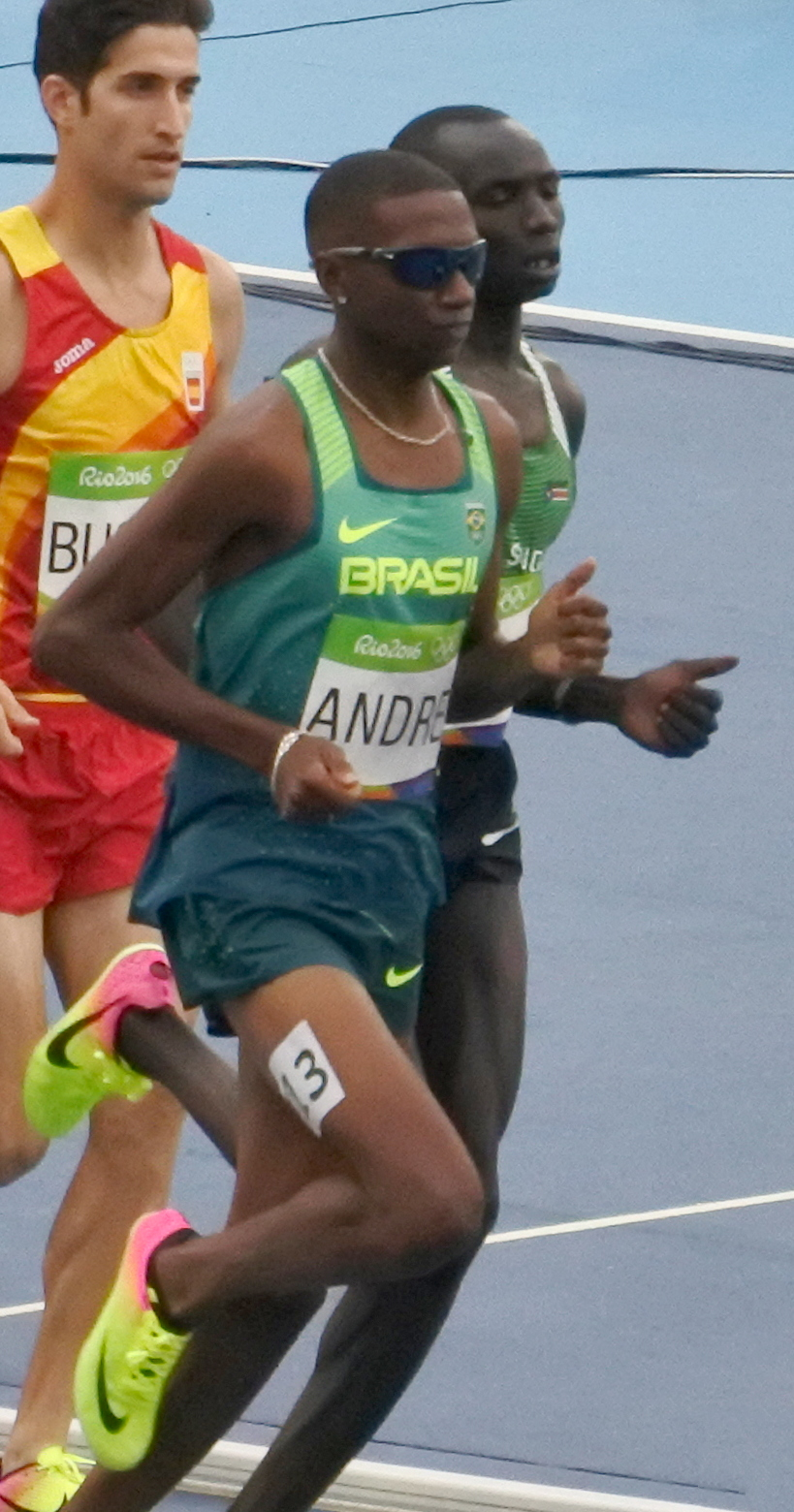
- André (left) at the 2016 Olympics

Personal information
- Full name: Thiago do Rosário André
- Born: 4 August 1995 (age 31) Belford Roxo, Rio de Janeiro, Brazil
- Height: 1.79 m (5 ft 10 in)
- Weight: 57 kg (126 lb)

Sport
- Sport: Athletics
- Event: 800–10,000 m
- Club: BM&F Bovespa
- Coached by: Adauto Domingues

Achievements and titles
- Personal bests: 800 m – 1:44.81 (2017); 1500 m – 3:35.28 (2017); Mile- 3:51.99 (2017); 3000 m – 7:56.78 (2018); 5000 m – 13:46.15 (2022); 10,000 m – 30:12.70 (2013)

Thiago do Rosário André (born 4 August 1995) is a Brazilian middle-distance runner.

== Running career ==
He represented his country in the 1500 metres at the 2016 Summer Olympics without advancing from the first round. He finished seventh in the 800 metres at the 2017 World Championships held in London.

He competed at the 2020 Summer Olympics.

== Personal life ==
André took up athletics aged 14. He is married to Jessica Gonzaga and has a son Gabriel.

== Competition record ==
| Year | Competition | Venue | Position | Event | Notes |
Representing Brazil
| 2012 | South American Youth Championships | Mendoza, Argentina | 1st | 3000 m | 8:34.47 |
| 2013 | Pan American Junior Championships | Medellín, Colombia | 2nd | 1500 m | 3:54.22 |
| 2013 | Pan American Junior Championships | Medellín, Colombia | 2nd | 5000 m | 14:52.46 |
| 2013 | South American Junior Championships | Resistencia, Argentina | 1st | 1500 m | 3:48.42 |
| 2013 | South American Junior Championships | Resistencia, Argentina | 1st | 5000 m | 14:46.51 |
| 2014 | Ibero-American Championships | São Paulo, Brazil | 2nd | 800 m | 1:45.99 |
| 2014 | Ibero-American Championships | São Paulo, Brazil | 12th | 1500 m | 4:14.27 |
| 2014 | World Junior Championships | Eugene, United States | 4th | 800 m | 1:46.06 |
| 2014 | World Junior Championships | Eugene, United States | 4th | 1500 m | 3:42.58 |
| 2015 | Pan American Games | Toronto, Canada | 8th | 1500 m | 3:43.71 |
| 2016 | Olympic Games | Rio de Janeiro, Brazil | 22nd (h) | 1500 m | 3:44.42 |
| 2017 | World Championships | London, United Kingdom | 7th | 800 m | 1:46:30 |
| 2018 | Ibero-American Championships | Trujillo, Peru | 1st | 800 m | 1:46.73 |
| 2018 | Ibero-American Championships | Trujillo, Peru | 2nd | 1500 m | 3:48.48 |
| 2021 | South American Championships | Guayaquil, Ecuador | 1st | 800 m | 1:45.62 |
| 2021 | South American Championships | Guayaquil, Ecuador | 1st | 1500 m | 3:37.92 |
| 2021 | Olympic Games | Tokyo, Japan | 39th (h) | 800 m | 1:47.75 |
| 2021 | Olympic Games | Tokyo, Japan | 39th (h) | 1500 m | 3:47.71 |
| 2023 | Pan American Games | Santiago, Chile | 6th | 1500 m | 3:40.48 |
| 2024 | South American Indoor Championships | Cochabamba, Bolivia | 3rd | 1500 m | 4:00.54 |
| 2024 | Ibero-American Championships | Cuiabá, Brazil | 1st | 1500 m | 3:39.60 |
| 2025 | South American Indoor Championships | Cochabamba, Bolivia | 1st | 1500 m | 3:50.09 |
| 2025 | South American Championships | Mar del Plata, Argentina | 3rd | 1500 m | 3:44.77 |
| 2026 | World Road Running Championships | Copenhagen, Denmark | 45th | 5 km | 14:00 |
