= Marizol Landázuri =

Ecuadorian sprinter (born 1991)

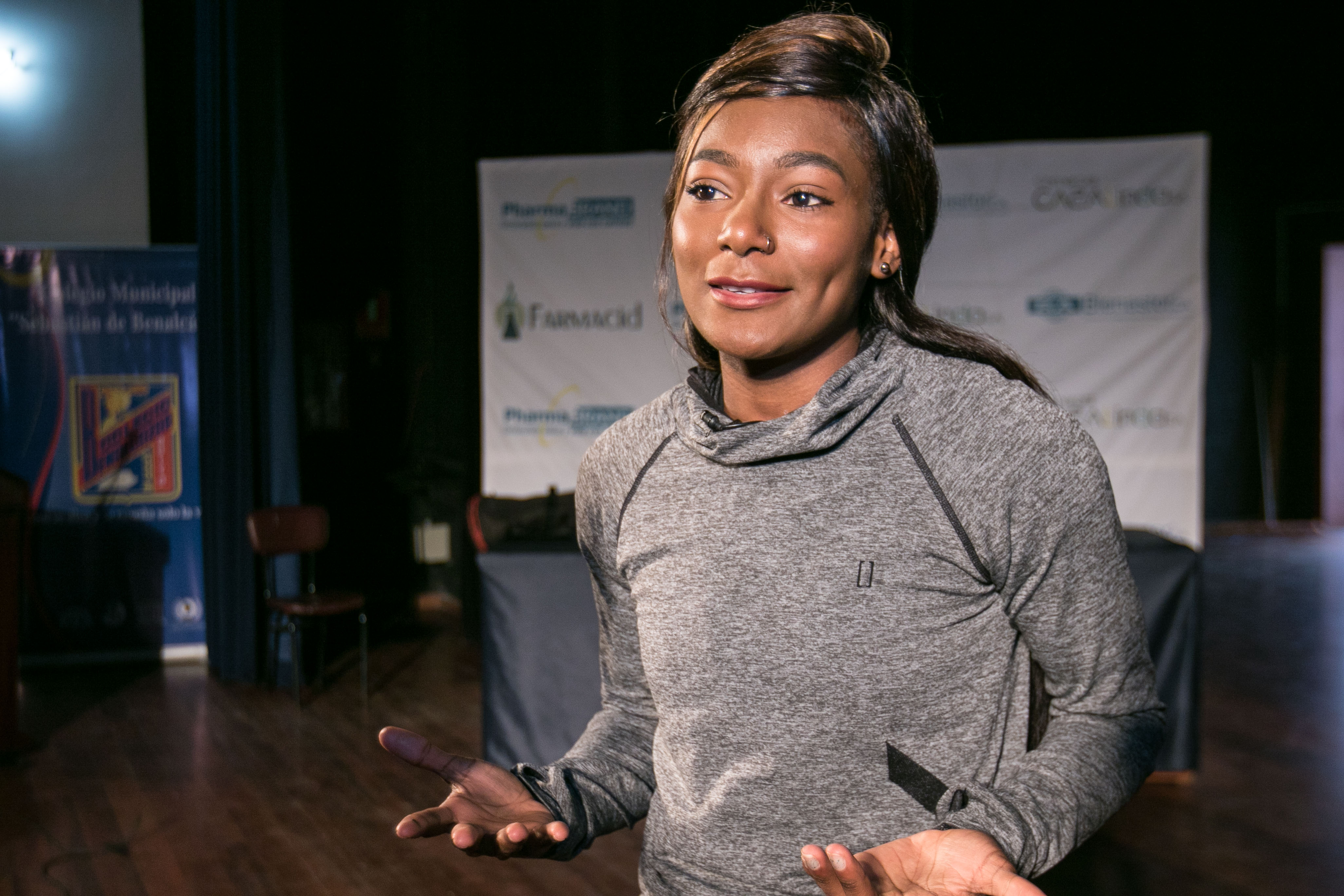

Personal information
- Born: 13 June 1991 (age 34) Esmeraldas, Ecuador
- Education: Universidad Estatal de Guayaquil
- Height: 1.65 m (5 ft 5 in)
- Weight: 52 kg (115 lb)

Sport
- Sport: Track and field
- Event: 100 metres

Narcisa Marizol Landázuri Benítez (born 13 June 1991) is an Ecuadorian sprinter. She competed in the 100 metres at the 2015 World Championships in Beijing without advancing from the first round. She competed at the 2020 Summer Olympics.

== Competition record ==
Year	Competition	Venue	Position	Event	Notes
Representing Ecuador
2013	Bolivarian Games	Trujillo, Peru	3rd	4 × 100 m relay	44.29
2014	Ibero-American Championships	São Paulo, Brazil	5th	100 m	11.61
2014	Ibero-American Championships	São Paulo, Brazil	2nd	200 m	23.60
2015	World Relays	Nassau, Bahamas	1st (B)	4 × 100 m relay	44.14
2015	South American Championships	Lima, Peru	7th	100 m	11.96
2015	South American Championships	Lima, Peru	4th	4 × 100 m relay	45.33
2015	Pan American Games	Toronto, Canada	14th (sf)	100 m	11.34 (w)
2015	Pan American Games	Toronto, Canada	19th (h)	200 m	23.74
2015	Pan American Games	Toronto, Canada	9th (h)	4 × 100 m relay	44.64
2015	World Championships	Beijing, China	35th (h)	100 m	11.48
2016	Ibero-American Championships	Rio de Janeiro, Brazil	3rd	100 m	11.35
2016	Ibero-American Championships	Rio de Janeiro, Brazil	6th	200 m	23.61
2016	Olympic Games	Rio de Janeiro, Brazil	19th (sf)	100 m	11.27
2017	World Relays	Nassau, Bahamas	1st (B)	4 × 100 m relay	44.26
2017	South American Championships	Asunción, Paraguay	4th	100 m	11.30 (w)
2017	South American Championships	Asunción, Paraguay	7th	200 m	23.93 (w)
2017	South American Championships	Asunción, Paraguay	3rd	4 × 100 m relay	44.53
2017	World Championships	London, United Kingdom	34th (h)	100 m	11.59
2017	World Championships	London, United Kingdom	12th (h)	4 × 100 m relay	43.94
2017	Bolivarian Games	Santa Marta, Colombia	2nd	100 m	11.30
2017	Bolivarian Games	Santa Marta, Colombia	3rd	200 m	23.65
2017	Bolivarian Games	Santa Marta, Colombia	2nd	4 × 100 m relay	45.15
2018	South American Games	Cochabamba, Bolivia	1st	100 m	11.12
2018	South American Games	Cochabamba, Bolivia	5th	200 m	23.65
2018	Ibero-American Championships	Trujillo, Peru	4th	100 m	11.71
2019	World Relays	Yokohama, Japan	16th (h)	4 × 100 m relay	44.74
2019	World Relays	Yokohama, Japan	6th	4 × 200 m relay	1:35.91
2021	World Relays	Chorzów, Poland	5th	4 × 100 m relay	44.43
2021	World Relays	Chorzów, Poland	3rd	4 × 200 m relay	1:36.86
2021	South American Championships	Guayaquil, Ecuador	2nd	100 m	11.39
2021	South American Championships	Guayaquil, Ecuador	2nd	200 m	23.35
2021	South American Championships	Guayaquil, Ecuador	3rd	4 × 100 m relay	45.66
2021	South American Championships	Guayaquil, Ecuador	4th	4 × 400 m relay	3:44.47
2021	Olympic Games	Tokyo, Japan	16th (h)	4 × 100 m relay	43.69

== Personal bests ==
- 100 metres – 11.12 (-1.2 m/s, Cochabamba 2018)
- 200 metres – 23.22 (-0.1 m/s, Quito 2017)
