= Maritza Guamán =

Ecuadorian race walker

Personal information
- Full name: Maritza Janneyh Guamán Maza
- Born: 15 January 1988 (age 38) Loja, Ecuador

Sport
- Sport: Track and field
- Event: 20 kilometres race walk

Maritza Janneyh Guamán Maza (born 15 January 1988) is an Ecuadorian race walker. She competed in the women's 20 kilometres walk event at the 2016 Summer Olympics.
