= Katerine Tisalema =

Ecuadorian long-distance runner

Personal information
- Full name: Katerine Ruth Tisalema Puruncaja
- Born: 28 July 1996 (age 29)

Sport
- Country: Ecuador
- Sport: Long-distance running

Katerine Ruth Tisalema Puruncaja (born 28 July 1996) is an Ecuadorian long-distance runner. In 2020, she competed in the women's half marathon at the 2020 World Athletics Half Marathon Championships held in Gdynia, Poland.
