= Tábata de Carvalho =

Brazilian sprinter (born 1996)

Personal information
- Full name: Tábata Vitorino de Carvalho
- Born: 23 April 1996 (age 30) Maringá, Brazil

Sport
- Sport: Athletics
- Event: 400 metres
Medal record
Women's athletics
Representing Brazil
Pan American Games
Silver medal – second place	2023 Santiago	4×400 m relay mixed

Tábata Vitorino de Carvalho (born 23 April 1996) is a Brazilian athlete. She competed in the mixed 4 × 400 metres relay event at the 2020 Summer Olympics.

== Personal bests ==
- 400 m: 51.99 – (Brazil) Rio de Janeiro, 23 Jun 2022
