= Liuba Zaldívar =

Cuban-born triple jumper

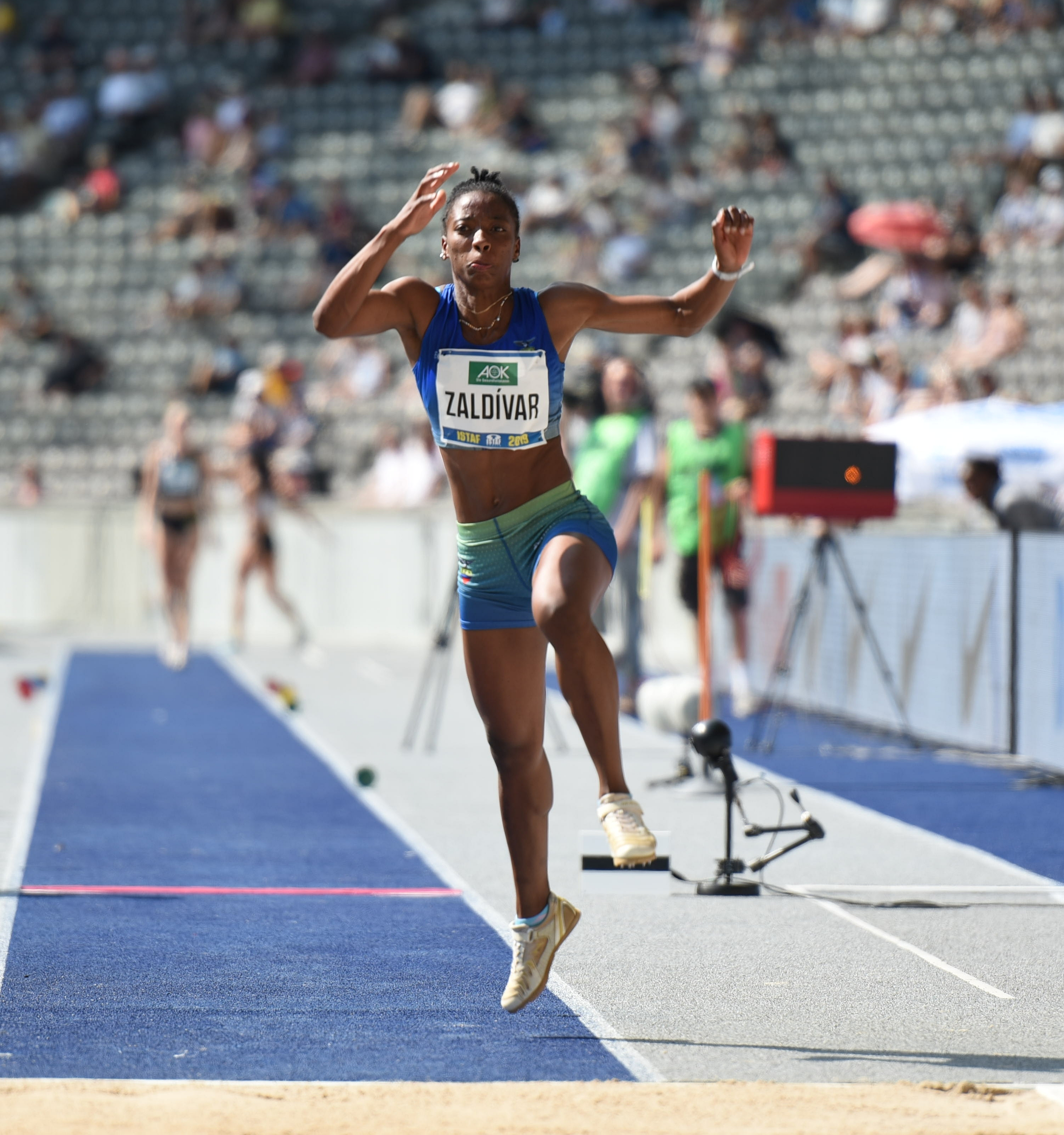

Personal information
- Born: 1993 (age 32–33) Banes, Cuba
- Height: 1.55 m (5 ft 1 in)
- Weight: 54 kg (119 lb)

Sport
- Country: Ecuador
- Sport: triple jump

Liuba María Zaldívar Rojas (born 1993) is a Cuban-born triple jumper who moved to compete for Ecuador. She qualified in 2019 and she took a gold medal in the Triple Jump at the 2022 Bolivarian Games for her new country.

== Life ==
Zaldívar was born in 1993 in Banes near Holguin in Cuba. She started in athletics early and she took to distance running where she competed with boys as the only athletes available. She became the nation's triple-jumper after she was spotted by her teacher Eugenio Ayala. For a while she would invariable return with a medal when representing Cuba abroad.

In 2010 she missed out on competing at the Youth Olympics in Singapore and in 2016 she did not compete at the Rio Olympics. In both cases the cause was paperwork which was not completed in time. Zaldívar gained her first international experience in 2012, when she won the gold medal for Cuba at the Central American and Caribbean Junior Championships in San Salvador with a distance of 13.78 m.

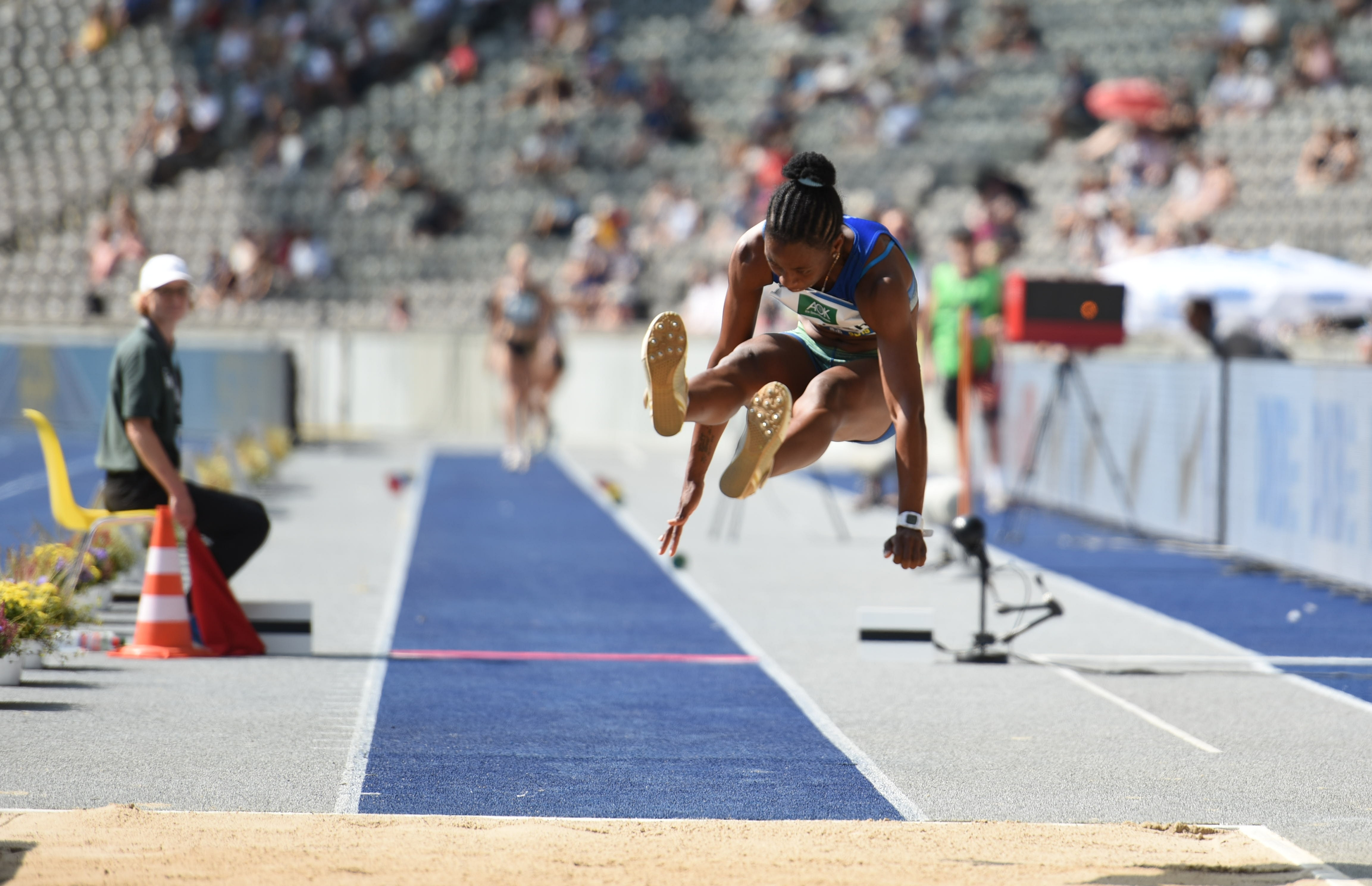
ISTAF Berlin 2019 Triple jump

She moved to Ecuador when she was 22 in 2015. Two years later she applied for Ecuadorian nationality but it was refused.

She was accepted as an Ecuadorian and able to first compete on 21 February 2019 under that flag. It was declared that she had been Cuban until 31 December 2014. In 2020 she competed in the Grand Prix in Quito where she was first with a distance of 13.78 beating Adriana Chila and Evelyn Aurora Zurita who were also from Ecuador.

In 2022 she won the triple jump at the Bolivarian Games in Colombia. She took the gold bedal with a distance of 13.57 beating the Venezuelan, Fernanda Maita González, and Ana Paula Arguello of Paraguay.
