= Brazil at the 2023 World Athletics Championships =

- Flag of Brazil
- WA code: BRA

in Budapest, Hungary 19 August 2023 – 27 August 2023
- Competitors: 55 (25 men and 30 women)
- Medals Ranked 39th: Gold 0 Silver 0 Bronze 1 Total 1

World Athletics Championships appearances (overview)
- 1983; 1987; 1991; 1993; 1995; 1997; 1999; 2001; 2003; 2005; 2007; 2009; 2011; 2013; 2015; 2017; 2019; 2022; 2023; 2025

Brazil competed at the 2023 World Athletics Championships in Budapest, Hungary, from 19 to 27 August 2023.

== Medalists ==
Medal	Athlete	Event	Date
Bronze	Caio Bonfim	Men's 20 kilometres walk	August 19

== Results ==
Brazil entered 55 athletes.

Key

- Q = Qualified for the next round
- q = Qualified for the next round as a fastest loser or, in field events, by position without achieving the qualifying target
- NR = National record
- PB = Personal best
- SB = Season best
- N/A = Round not applicable for the event

=== Men ===
Track and road events

Athlete	Event	Heat		Semifinal		Final	
Athlete	Event	Result	Rank	Result	Rank	Result	Rank
Felipe Bardi	100 metres	10.25	6	Did not advance			
Paulo André de Oliveira	100 metres	10.25	6	Did not advance			
Erik Cardoso	100 metres	10.36	6	Did not advance			
Renan Correa	200 metres	20.44	2 Q	20.43	5	Did not advance	
Lucas Rodrigues da Silva	200 metres	20.86	5	Did not advance			
Jorge Vides	200 metres	20.80	6	Did not advance			
Lucas Carvalho	400 metres	45.34	4	Did not advance			
Eduardo Ribeiro	800 metres	1:47.75	6	Did not advance			
Johnatas Cruz	Marathon	—N/a				2:15:13	29
Paulo Roberto Paula	Marathon	—N/a				2:17:18	39
Justino Pedro da Silva	Marathon	—N/a				2:25:53	58
Gabriel Constantino	110 metres hurdles	13.58	6	Did not advance			
Rafael Pereira	110 metres hurdles	13.52	3 Q	13.52	8	Did not advance	
Eduardo de Deus	110 metres hurdles	13.37 SB	3 Q	13.52	6	Did not advance	
Alison dos Santos	400 metres hurdles	48.12	1 Q	47.38 SB	2 Q	48.10	5
Caio Bonfim	20 kilometres walk	—N/a				1:17:47 NR	3rd place, bronze medalist(s)
Caio Bonfim	35 kilometres walk	—N/a				2:27.45	10
Max Batista	20 kilometres walk	—N/a				1:24:10 PB	36
Felipe Bardi; Erik Cardoso; Rodrigo do Nascimento; Jorge Vides; Paulo André de Oliveira*	4 × 100 metres relay	38.19 SB	4 q	—N/a		DQ	

Field events

Athlete	Event	Qualification		Final	
Athlete	Event	Distance	Position	Distance	Position
Fernando Ferreira	High jump	2.25 SB	16	Did not advance	
Almir dos Santos	Triple jump	16.34	21	Did not advance	
Welington Morais	Shot put	20.30	17	Did not advance	
Darlan Romani	Shot put	22.37 SB	1 Q	21.41	8
Luiz Mauricio da Silva	Javelin throw	77.70	20	Did not advance	
Pedro Henrique Rodrigues	Javelin throw	72.34	34	Did not advance	

Combined events – Decathlon

Athlete	Event	100 m	LJ	SP	HJ	400 m	110H	DT	PV	JT	1500 m	Final	Rank
José Fernando Ferreira	Result	10.77	6.92	12.90	1.93	49.31	13.94 PB	42.60	4.80	69.19	5:00.91	7935	14
José Fernando Ferreira	Points	912	695	661	740	847	982	718	849	877	554	7935	14

=== Women ===
Track and road events

Athlete	Event	Heat		Semifinal		Final	
Athlete	Event	Result	Rank	Result	Rank	Result	Rank
Vitória Cristina Rosa	100 metres	11.57	6	Did not advance			
Ana Azevedo	200 metres	23.45	7	Did not advance			
Vitória Cristina Rosa	200 metres	23.86	8	Did not advance			
Tiffani Marinho	400 metres	53.12	7	Did not advance			
Tábata de Carvalho	400 metres	54.15	8	Did not advance			
Flávia de Lima	800 metres	2:00.92 SB	3 Q	2:00.77 SB	8	Did not advance	
Jaqueline Beatriz Weber	1500 metres	4:14.46 PB	13	Did not advance			
Maria Lucineida da Silva	10,000 metres	—N/a				35:54.18	21
Valdilene dos Santos Silva	Marathon	—N/a				2:39:58	47
Andreia Hessel	Marathon	—N/a				2:42:23 SB	52
Mirela Saturnino	Marathon	—N/a				2:47:29	64
Caroline Tomaz	100 metres hurdles	13.59	9	Did not advance			
Chayenne da Silva	400 metres hurdles	56.25	5	Did not advance			
Tatiane Raquel da Silva	3000 metres steeplechase	10:19.80	11	—N/a		Did not advance	
Gabriela de Sousa	20 kilometres walk	—N/a				1:33:59	26
Viviane Lyra	20 kilometres walk	—N/a				1:28:36 PB	8
Érica de Sena	20 kilometres walk	—N/a				1:29:53	13
Viviane Lyra	35 kilometres walk	—N/a				2:44.40 NR	4
Elianay Pereira	35 kilometres walk	—N/a				3:16.11	36
Érica de Sena	35 kilometres walk	—N/a				DNF	
Ana Azevedo; Gabriela Mourão; Vitória Cristina Rosa; Rosângela Santos	4 × 100 metres relay	43.46 SB	8	—N/a		Did not advance	

Field events

Athlete	Event	Qualification		Final	
Athlete	Event	Distance	Position	Distance	Position
Valdileia Martins	High jump	1.85	27	Did not advance	
Juliana Campos	Pole vault	4.50	22	Did not advance	
Lissandra Campos	Long jump	6.01	33	Did not advance	
Eliane Martins	Long jump	6.38	26	Did not advance	
Leticia Oro Melo	Long jump	6.73 SB	7 q	6.12	12
Gabriele Santos	Triple jump	13.66	23	Did not advance	
Lívia Avancini	Shot put	16.62	28	Did not advance	
Ana Caroline Silva	Shot put	17.18	25	Did not advance	
Izabela da Silva	Discus throw	58.45	22	Did not advance	
Andressa de Morais	Discus throw	59.15	17	Did not advance	
Jucilene de Lima	Javelin throw	59.76	11 q	60.34	8
