= Brazil at the 2022 World Athletics Championships =

- Flag of Brazil
- WA code: BRA
- National federation: Brazilian Athletics Confederation
- Website: www.cbat.org.br

in Eugene, United States July 15, 2022 – July 24, 2022
- Competitors: 58 (23 men and 35 women) in 34 events
- Medals Ranked 19th: Gold 1 Silver 0 Bronze 1 Total 2

World Athletics Championships appearances (overview)
- 1983; 1987; 1991; 1993; 1995; 1997; 1999; 2001; 2003; 2005; 2007; 2009; 2011; 2013; 2015; 2017; 2019; 2022; 2023; 2025

Brazil competed at the 2022 World Athletics Championships in Eugene, United States, from July 15 to 24, 2022. The Brazilian Athletics Confederation entered 58 athletes.

On July 19, 2022, Alison dos Santos became the first Brazilian man to win a gold medal, with a Championship Record in men's 400 m hurdles.

With 1 gold and 1 bronze medals, Brazil finished 19th in the medal table and ranked 13th in the overall placing table with a total of 34 points.

== Medalists ==
Medal	Athlete	Event	Date
Gold	Alison dos Santos	Men's 400 m hurdles	July 19
Bronze	Leticia Oro Melo	Women's long jump	July 24

== Team ==
On July 1, 2022, the Brazilian Athletics Confederation announced a team conformed by 52 athletes (33 men and 19 women). A week later, the Brazilian team was expanded to 58 athletes by adding 2 men and 4 women because of the points ranking quota.

Sprinters Gabriel Garcia and Lucas Rodrigues were included in the team for the men's 4 × 100 metres relay, but finally they had no participation. In the same way, Lucas Carvalho and Maria Victoria De Sena were part of the mixed 4 × 400 metres relay team, but had no participation.

== Results ==
Brazil entered 58 athletes.

Key

- Note: Ranks given for track events are within the athlete's heat only
- Q = Qualified for the next round
- q = Qualified for the next round as a fastest loser or, in field events, by position without achieving the qualifying target
- NR = National record
- PB = Personal best
- SB = Season best
- N/A = Round not applicable for the event

=== Men ===
Track events

Athlete	Event	Heat		Semi-final		Final	
Athlete	Event	Result	Rank	Result	Rank	Result	Rank
Felipe Bardi	100 metres	10.22 (−0.3)	5	Did not advance			
Erik Cardoso	100 metres	10.18 (+0.5)	3 Q	10.15 (−0.1)	6	Did not advance	
Rodrigo do Nascimento	100 metres	10.11 (+0.6)	3 Q	10.19 (+0.3)	7	Did not advance	
Felipe Bardi	200 metres	Withdrew from the competition					
Lucas Rodrigues da Silva	200 metres	20.90 (+1.0)	6	Did not advance			
Lucas Vilar	200 metres	20.65 (−0.3) SB	6	Did not advance			
Lucas Carvalho	400 metres	47.53	6	Did not advance			
Thiago André	800 metres	Withdrew from the competition					
Thiago André	1500 metres	DNS		Did not advance			
Altobeli da Silva	5000 metres	13:43.80 SB	17	Did not advance			
Daniel do Nascimento	Marathon	—N/a				2:07:35	8
José Márcio Leão	Marathon	—N/a				2:11:43	27
Paulo Roberto Paula	Marathon	—N/a				2:13:39	37
Gabriel Constantino	110 metres hurdles	DQ TR22.6.2		Did not advance			
Rafael Pereira	110 metres hurdles	13.23 (+0.2)	2 Q	13.46 (−0.6)	4	Did not advance	
Eduardo Rodrigues	110 metres hurdles	13.46 (+0.4)	4 Q	13.62 (+0.3)	8	Did not advance	
Alison dos Santos	400 metres hurdles	49.41	1 Q	47.85	1 Q	46.29 CR, AR, WL	1st place, gold medalist(s)
Mahau Suguimati	400 metres hurdles	52.43	8	Did not advance			
Altobeli da Silva	3000 metres steeplechase	Withdrew from the competition					
Felipe Bardi; Erik Cardoso; Rodrigo do Nascimento; Derick Silva	4 × 100 metres relay	38.41 SB	5 q	—N/a		38.25 SB	7
Caio Bonfim	20 kilometres walk	—N/a				1:19.51	6
Matheus Corrêa	20 kilometres walk	—N/a				1:27:31	30
Lucas Mazzo	20 kilometres walk	—N/a				1:29:32	36
Caio Bonfim	35 kilometres walk	—N/a				2:25:14 NR	7

* – Indicates the athlete competed in preliminaries but not the final.

Field events

Athlete	Event	Qualification		Final	
Athlete	Event	Distance	Position	Distance	Position
Fernando Ferreira	High jump	Withdrew from the competition			
Thiago Moura	High jump	2.25	18	Did not advance	
Thiago Braz	Pole vault	5.75	4 q	5.87	4
Augusto Dutra	Pole vault	NM		Did not advance	
Samory Fraga	Long jump	7.51	27	Did not advance	
Mateus de Sá	Triple jump	16.04	24	Did not advance	
Almir dos Santos	Triple jump	16.71	9 q	16.87	7
Alexsandro Melo	Triple jump	NM		Did not advance	
Willian Dourado	Shot put	19.73	21	Did not advance	
Welington Morais	Shot put	19.80	19	Did not advance	
Darlan Romani	Shot put	20.98	9 q	21.92	5
Allan Wolski	Hammer throw	71.27	26	Did not advance	

=== Women ===
Track events

Athlete	Event	Heat		Semi-final		Final	
Athlete	Event	Result	Rank	Result	Rank	Result	Rank
Vitoria Cristina Rosa	100 metres	11.20 (+1.2)	5	Did not advance			
Ana Carolina Azevedo	200 metres	23.45 (+0.4)	6	Did not advance			
Lorraine Martins	200 metres	23.60 (+2.5)	8	Did not advance			
Vitoria Cristina Rosa	200 metres	22.84 (+1.1)	3 Q	22.47 (+1.4) AR	4	Did not advance	
Tiffani Marinho	400 metres	52.80	6	Did not advance			
Tábata de Carvalho	400 metres	52.17	6 q	52.42	8	Did not advance	
Ketiley Batista	100 metres hurdles	14.22 (−0.4)	7	Did not advance			
Chayenne Da Silva	400 metres hurdles	59.46	7	Did not advance			
Tatiane Raquel da Silva	3000 metres steeplechase	9:26.25	8	—N/a		Did not advance	
Simone Ferraz	3000 metres steeplechase	9:53.52	12	—N/a		Did not advance	
Viviane Lyra	20 kilometres walk	—N/a				1:33:11	17
Viviane Lyra	35 kilometres walk	—N/a				2:45:02	8 NR
Elianay Pereira	35 kilometres walk	—N/a				3:05:39	30 PB
Mayara Vicentainer	35 kilometres walk	—N/a				3:06:10	31

Field events

Athlete	Event	Qualification		Final	
Athlete	Event	Distance	Position	Distance	Position
Eliane Martins	Long jump	6.33	21	Did not advance	
Leticia Oro Melo	Long jump	6.64 SB	12 q	6.89 PB	3rd place, bronze medalist(s)
Gabriele Sousa dos Santos	Triple jump	13.62	25	Did not advance	
Livia Avancini	Shot put	16.13	28	Did not advance	
Ana Caroline Silva	Shot put	16.58	26	Did not advance	
Izabela da Silva	Discus throw	59.78	15	Did not advance	
Andressa de Morais	Discus throw	58.11	20	Did not advance	
Fernanda Martins	Discus throw	60.08	14	Did not advance	
Mariana Grasielly Marcelino	Hammer throw	64.72	29	Did not advance	
Jucilene de Lima	Javelin throw	57.13	19	Did not advance	

=== Mixed ===
Athlete	Event	Heat		Final	
Athlete	Event	Result	Rank	Result	Rank
Vitor Hugo de Miranda; Douglas Hernandes; Tiffani Marinho; Tábata de Carvalho	4 × 400 metres relay	3:18.19 SB	6	Did not advance	
