= Brazil at the 2019 World Athletics Championships =

- WA code: BRA

in Doha, Qatar
- Competitors: 39 (23 men and 16 women) in 25 events
- Medals: Gold 0 Silver 0 Bronze 0 Total 0

World Athletics Championships appearances (overview)
- 1983; 1987; 1991; 1993; 1995; 1997; 1999; 2001; 2003; 2005; 2007; 2009; 2011; 2013; 2015; 2017; 2019; 2022; 2023; 2025

Brazil competed at the 2019 World Athletics Championships in Doha, Qatar from 27 September to 6 October 2019.

== Results ==
(q – qualified, NM – no mark, SB – season best)

=== Men ===
Track and road events

Athlete	Event	Heat		Semifinal		Final	
Athlete	Event	Result	Rank	Result	Rank	Result	Rank
Rodrigo do Nascimento	100 m	10.25	30	did not advance			
Vitor Hugo dos Santos	100 m	10.42	41	did not advance			
Paulo André de Oliveira	100 m	10.11	9 Q	10.14	12	did not advance	
Paulo André de Oliveira	200 m	20.75	36	did not advance			
Aldemir da Silva Júnior	200 m	20.44	23	did not advance			
Lucas Carvalho	400 m	46.01	27	did not advance			
Paulo Roberto Paula	Marathon	—				2:15:09	19
Wellington Bezerra da Silva	Marathon	—				2:21:49	44
Vagner da Silva Noronha	Marathon	—				2:26:11	51
Altobeli da Silva	3000 m steeplechase	8:25.34	21	—		did not advance	
Eduardo de Deus	110 m hurdles	13.92	32	did not advance			
Gabriel Constantino	110 m hurdles	DQ		did not advance			
Alison dos Santos	400 m hurdles	49.66	13 Q	48.35 PB	2 Q	48.28 PB	7
Márcio Teles	400 m hurdles	51.02	32	did not advance			
Artur Terezan	400 m hurdles	51.52 SB	34	did not advance			
Rodrigo do Nascimento; Vitor Hugo dos Santos; Derick Silva; Paulo André de Oliveira	4 × 100 m relay	37.90 =NR	6 Q	—		37.72 NR	4
Caio Bonfim	20 km walk	—				1:31:32	13
Moacir Zimmermann	20 km walk	—				1:44:16	39

Field events

Athlete	Event	Qualification		Final	
Athlete	Event	Result	Rank	Result	Rank
Thiago Braz	Pole vault	5.75	4 Q	5.70	5
Augusto Dutra de Oliveira	Pole vault	5.70	10 q	5.55	10
Almir dos Santos	Triple jump	16.92	8 q	15.01	12
Alexsandro Melo	Triple jump	16.26	27	did not advance	
Darlan Romani	Shot put	21.69	2 Q	22.53	4

=== Women ===
Track and road events

Athlete	Event	Heat		Semifinal		Final	
Athlete	Event	Result	Rank	Result	Rank	Result	Rank
Rosângela Santos	100 m	11.32	26	did not advance			
Vitória Cristina Rosa	100 m	11.41	33	did not advance			
Vitória Cristina Rosa	200 m	23.81	41	did not advance			
Lorraine Martins	200 m	23.56	38	did not advance			
Tiffani Marinho	400 m	51.96	24	did not advance			
Valdilene dos Santos Silva	Marathon	—				2:59:00	30
Andreia Hessel	Marathon	—				3:06:13	36
Jessica Moreira	400 m hurdles	57.37	33	did not advance			
Bruna Farias; Vitória Cristina Rosa; Lorraine Martins; Rosângela Santos	4 × 100 m relay	DQ		—		did not advance	
Érica de Sena	20 km walk	—				1:33:36	4
Viviane Lyra	20 km walk	—				did not finish	
Elianay Pereira	50 km walk	—				5:11:26	16

Field events

Athlete	Event	Qualification		Final	
Athlete	Event	Result	Rank	Result	Rank
Eliane Martins	Long jump	6.50	15	did not advance	
Geisa Arcanjo	Shot put	17.45	21	did not advance	
Fernanda Martins	Discus throw	62.33	10 q	62.44	6
Laila Ferrer e Silva	Javelin throw	55.49	28	did not advance	

=== Mixed ===
Track and road events

Athlete	Event	Heat		Semifinal		Final	
Athlete	Event	Result	Rank	Result	Rank	Result	Rank
Anderson Henriques; Tiffani Marinho; Geisa Coutinho; Alexander Russo; Lucas Carvalho*	4 × 400 m relay	3:16.12 AR	6 Q	—		3:16.22	8
