= Brazil at the 2017 World Championships in Athletics =

- Flag of Brazil
- WA code: BRA
- National federation: Brazilian Athletics Confederation
- Website: cbat.org.br (in Portuguese)

in London, United Kingdom 4–13 August 2017
- Competitors: 36 (20 men and 16 women) in 27 events
- Medals Ranked =37th: Gold 0 Silver 0 Bronze 1 Total 1

World Championships in Athletics appearances (overview)
- 1983; 1987; 1991; 1993; 1995; 1997; 1999; 2001; 2003; 2005; 2007; 2009; 2011; 2013; 2015; 2017; 2019; 2022; 2023; 2025

Brazil competed at the 2017 World Championships in Athletics in London, United Kingdom, from 4–13 August 2017.

== Medalists ==
Medal	Athlete	Event	Date
Bronze	Caio Bonfim	20 kilometres walk	13 August

== Results ==
=== Men ===
Track and road events

Athlete	Event	Heat		Semifinal		Final	
Athlete	Event	Result	Rank	Result	Rank	Result	Rank
Aldemir da Silva Júnior	200 metres	20.82	36	Did not advance			
Lucas Carvalho	400 metres	45.86	28	Did not advance			
Thiago André	800 metres	1:47.22	28 Q	1:45.83	6 q	1:46.30	7
Thiago André	1500 metres	DNS	–	Did not advance			
Altobeli da Silva	3000 metres steeplechase	8:31.82	21	—N/a		Did not advance	
Éder Antônio Souza	110 metres hurdles	13.56	23 Q	13.70	19	Did not advance	
Hederson Estefani	400 metres hurdles	50.22	25	Did not advance			
Márcio Teles	400 metres hurdles	49.41	6 Q	DNF	–	Did not advance	
Lucas Carvalho; Alexander Russo; Anderson Henriques; Hugo de Sousa	4 × 400 metres relay	3:04.02 SB	13	—N/a		Did not advance	
Caio Bonfim	20 kilometres walk	—N/a				1:19:04 NR	3rd place, bronze medalist(s)

Field events

Athlete	Event	Qualification		Final	
Athlete	Event	Distance	Position	Distance	Position
Fernando Ferreira	High jump	2.29	17	Did not advance	
Talles Frederico Silva	High jump	2.29	13	Did not advance	
Paulo Sérgio Oliveira	Long jump	7.53	27	Did not advance	
Mateus de Sá	Triple jump	16.10	27	Did not advance	
Darlan Romani	Shot put	20.21	15	Did not advance	
Wagner Domingos	Hammer throw	71.69	24	Did not advance	
Allan Wolski	Hammer throw	72.51	19	Did not advance	

Combined events – Decathlon

Athlete	Event	100 m	LJ	SP	HJ	400 m	110H	DT	PV	JT	1500 m	Final	Rank
Luiz Alberto de Araújo	Result	11.07	NM	DNS	–	–	–	–	–	–	–	DNF	
Luiz Alberto de Araújo	Points	845	0	0	–	–	–	–	–	–	–	DNF	
Jefferson Santos	Result	DNS	DNS	DNS	–	–	–	–	–	–	–	DNF	
Jefferson Santos	Points	0	0	0	–	–	–	–	–	–	–	DNF	

=== Women ===
Track and road events

Athlete	Event	Heat		Semifinal		Final	
Athlete	Event	Result	Rank	Result	Rank	Result	Rank
Rosângela Santos	100 metres	11.04	4 Q	10.91 AR	3 Q	11.06	7
Rosângela Santos	200 metres	23.34	20 Q	DQ	–	Did not advance	
Vitória Cristina Rosa	200 metres	23.26	17 Q	23.31	19	Did not advance	
Fabiana Moraes	100 metres hurdles	13.40	36	Did not advance			
Franciela Krasucki; Ana Cláudia Lemos; Vitória Cristina Rosa; Rosângela Santos	4 × 100 metres relay	42.77 SB	7 Q	—N/a		42.63 SB	7
Érica de Sena	20 kilometres walk	—N/a				1:26:59 AR	4
Nair da Rosa	50 kilometres walk	—N/a				DNF	–

Field events

Athlete	Event	Qualification		Final	
Athlete	Event	Distance	Position	Distance	Position
Eliane Martins	Long jump	6.46	12 q	6.52	11
Tânia da Silva	Triple jump	13.74	21	Did not advance	
Geisa Arcanjo	Shot put	17.79	12 q	18.03	9
Andressa de Morais	Discus throw	62.80	8 Q	60.00	11
Fernanda Martins	Discus throw	58.51	16	Did not advance	
Laila Domingos	Javelin throw	60.54	18	Did not advance	

Combined events – Heptathlon

Athlete	Event	100H	HJ	SP	200 m	LJ	JT	800 m	Final	Rank
Vanessa Spínola	Result	14.94	1.68	12.12	25.15	5.23	39.36	DNF	4500	29
Vanessa Spínola	Points	850	830	669	873	623	655	0	4500	29
Tamara de Sousa	Result	14.16	1.74	13.69	24.64	5.69	40.65	2:34.03	5631	24
Tamara de Sousa	Points	956	903	773	920	756	680	643	5631	24

== Athletes who achieved standards, but not selected ==
- Adriana Aparecida da Silva - Women's marathon (outside the Top-40 Olympic Ranking)
- Andreia Aparecida Hessel - Women's marathon (outside the Top-40 Olympic Ranking)
- Thiago Braz da Silva - Men's pole vault (injured)
- Geisa Coutinho - Women's 400 metres (outside the Top-40 Olympic Ranking)
- Paulo Roberto Paula - Men's marathon (outside the Top-40 Olympic Ranking)
- Jonathan Rieckmann - Men's 50 kilometres walk (injured)
- Valdilene dos Santos Silva - Women's marathon (outside the Top-40 Olympic Ranking)
- Mirela Saturnino de Andrade - Women's marathon (outside the Top-40 Olympic Ranking)
- Núbia Soares - Women's triple jump (injured)
- Moacir Zimmermann - Men's 20 kilometres walk (outside the Top-40 Olympic Ranking)
