= Brazil at the 2025 World Athletics Championships =

- Flag of Brazil
- WA code: BRA

in Tokyo, Japan 13 September 2025 – 21 September 2025
- Competitors: 47 (27 men and 20 women)
- Medals Ranked 13th: Gold 1 Silver 2 Bronze 0 Total 3

World Athletics Championships appearances (overview)
- 1983; 1987; 1991; 1993; 1995; 1997; 1999; 2001; 2003; 2005; 2007; 2009; 2011; 2013; 2015; 2017; 2019; 2022; 2023; 2025

Brazil competed at the 2025 World Athletics Championships in Tokyo, Japan, from 13 to 21 September 2025.

== Medallists ==
Medal	Athlete	Event	Date
Gold	Caio Bonfim	Men's 20 kilometres walk	September 20
Silver	Caio Bonfim	Men's 35 kilometres walk	September 13
Silver	Alison dos Santos	Men's 400 metres hurdles	September 19

== Results ==
Brazil entered 47 athletes to the championships: 20 women and 27 men.

Key

- Q = Qualified for the next round
- q = Qualified for the next round as a fastest loser or, in field events, by position without achieving the qualifying target
- NR = National record
- PB = Personal best
- SB = Season best
- N/A = Round not applicable for the event

=== Men ===
Track and road events

Athlete	Event	Heat		Semifinal		Final	
Athlete	Event	Result	Rank	Result	Rank	Result	Rank
Felipe Bardi	100 metres	10.54	8	Did not advance			
Erik Cardoso	100 metres	10.32	7	Did not advance			
Eduardo Ribeiro	800 metres	1:50.40	9	Did not advance			
Johnatas Cruz	Marathon	—N/a				2:18:22	38
Paulo Roberto Paula	Marathon	—N/a				2:20:18	45
Ederson Pereira	Marathon	—N/a				2:28:40	63
Thiago Ornelas dos Santos	110 metres hurdles	13.52	4 Q	13.58	7	Did not advance	
Eduardo Rodrigues	110 metres hurdles	13.45	5 q	13.91	8	Did not advance	
Francisco Guilherme dos Reis Viana	400 metres hurdles	48.69 PB	3 Q	49.01	6	Did not advance	
Alison dos Santos	400 metres hurdles	48.48	2 Q	48.16	2 Q	46.84	2nd place, silver medalist(s)
Matheus Lima	400 metres hurdles	48.15	1 Q	48.16	5	Did not advance	
Caio Bonfim	20 kilometres walk	—N/a				1:18:35	1st place, gold medalist(s)
Matheus Correa	20 kilometres walk	—N/a				1:21:04 SB	17
Max Batista Gonçalves dos Santos	20 kilometres walk	—N/a				1:27:34	42
Caio Bonfim	35 kilometres walk	—N/a				2:28:55 SB	2nd place, silver medalist(s)
Matheus Correa	35 kilometres walk	—N/a				2:36:35 PB	15
Max Batista Gonçalves dos Santos	35 kilometres walk	—N/a				2:41:04 SB	27
Alison dos Santos; Tiago Lemes da Silva; Matheus Lima; Lucas Vilar	4 × 400 metres relay	DQ		—N/a		Did not advance	

Field events

Athlete	Event	Qualification		Final	
Athlete	Event	Distance	Position	Distance	Position
Thiago Moura	High jump	2.16	29	Did not advance	
Almir dos Santos	Triple jump	16.79	13	Did not advance	
Elton Petronilho	Triple jump	16.51	20	Did not advance	
Willian Dourado	Shot put	19.78	21	Did not advance	
Welington Morais	Shot put	DNS		Did not advance	
Wellinton da Cruz Filho	Discus throw	59.16	30	Did not advance	
Luiz Maurício da Silva	Javelin throw	81.12	19	Did not advance	
Pedro Henrique Rodrigues	Javelin throw	79.35	25	Did not advance	

Combined events – Decathlon

Athlete	Event	100 m	LJ	SP	HJ	400 m	110H	DT	PV	JT	1500 m	Final	Rank
José Fernando Ferreira	Result	10.94	7.08	13.74	1.90	49.78	13.85	44.88	4.80	64.23	4:59.87	7927 SB	13
José Fernando Ferreira	Points	874	833	712	714	825	994	764	849	802	560	7927 SB	13

=== Women ===
Track and road events

Athlete	Event	Heat		Semifinal		Final	
Athlete	Event	Result	Rank	Result	Rank	Result	Rank
Ana Carolina Azevedo	100 metres	11.24	5	Did not advance			
Tiffani Marinho	400 metres	53.34	8	Did not advance			
Núbia Silva	10,000 metres	—N/a				36:00.21	24
Tatiane Raquel da Silva	3000 metres steeplechase	9:59.81	12	—N/a		Did not advance	
Ketiley Batista	100 metres hurdles	13.30	7	Did not advance			
Gabriela de Sousa	20 kilometres walk	—N/a				1:34:28 SB	32
Viviane Lyra	20 kilometres walk	—N/a				1:29:02	12
Erica Sena	20 kilometres walk	—N/a				Did not finish	
Viviane Lyra	35 kilometres walk	—N/a				2:51:16	13
Elianay Pereira	35 kilometres walk	—N/a				3:20:32	36
Mayara Luize Vincentainer	35 kilometres walk	—N/a				3:08:54	26

Field events

Athlete	Event	Qualification		Final	
Athlete	Event	Distance	Position	Distance	Position
Beatriz Chagas	Pole vault	NM		Did not advance	
Juliana de Menis Campos	Pole vault	4.60	1 q	NM	
Lissandra Campos	Long jump	DNS		Did not advance	
Regiclécia Cândido	Triple jump	NM		Did not advance	
Gabriele Santos	Triple jump	13.54	28	Did not advance	
Ana Caroline Silva	Shot put	16.40	34	Did not advance	
Izabela da Silva	Discus throw	63.75 SB	6 q	63.22	9
Andressa de Morais	Discus throw	52.99	37	Did not advance	
Jucilene de Lima	Javelin throw	59.79	17	Did not advance	
Daniella Mieko Nisimura	Javelin throw	53.01	35	Did not advance	
