= 2020 Troféu Brasil de Atletismo =

- Dates: 10–13 December 2020
- Host city: São Paulo, Brazil
- Venue: Centro Olímpico de Treinamento e Pesquisa

The 2020 Troféu Brasil de Atletismo was the national club championships in outdoor track and field for Brazil, also effectively serving as the top level national competition for individuals. It was held from 10–13 December at the Centro Olímpico de Treinamento e Pesquisa in São Paulo. The competition was originally scheduled earlier in the year, but the events were delayed due to the COVID-19 pandemic. This necessitated a change of location and events were carried out without an audience.

== Results ==
=== Men ===
Event	Gold		Silver		Bronze	
100 metres	Paulo André de Oliveira	10.13 s	Felipe Bardi dos Santos	10.18 s	Derick Silva	10.25 s
200 metres	Lucas Carvalho	20.40 s PB	Aldemir da Silva Júnior	20.41 s SB	Paulo André de Oliveira	20.52 s
400 metres	Lucas Carvalho	45.53 s SB	Anderson Henriques	45.81 s SB	João Henrique Cabral	46.26 s PB
800 metres	Thiago André	1:46.33 min SB	Eduardo Ribeiro dos Santos	1:46.87 min PB	Guilherme Kurtz	1:47.12 min PB
1500 metres	Thiago André	3:39.24 min SB	Guilherme Kurtz	3:46.19 min PB	Leandro Alves	3:46.53 min PB
5000 metres	Altobeli da Silva	14:03.18 min SB	Gilmar Silvestre Lopes	14:13.43 min PB	Daniel do Nascimento	14:17.07 min PB
10,000 metres	Daniel do Nascimento	29:13.34 min SB	Gilmar Silvestre Lopes	29:37.28 min SB	Gilberto Silvestre Lopes	29:59.15 min SB
110 m hurdles	Jonathas Filipe da Silva Brito	13.57 s SB	Rafael Henrique Pereira	13.64 s PB	Eduardo de Deus	13.66 s SB
400 m hurdles	Artur Terezan	50.23 s SB	Mahau Suguimati	50.48 s SB	Márcio Teles	50.55 s SB
3000 m s'chase	Altobeli da Silva	8:34.32 min	Israel Mecabo	8:55.03 min SB	Jean Machado	8:56.82 min SB
4 × 100 m relay	Esporte Clube Pinheiros; Hederson Estefani; Aldemir da Silva Júnior; Derick Silva; Paulo André de Oliveira	39.49 s	SESI - SP; Rafael de Andrade; Lucas Vilar; Erik Cardoso; Felipe Bardi dos Santos	40.05 s	UCA; Fábio de Oliveira; Jonatan Chaves; Lucas Dalsenter; Willian da Silva	40.21 s
4 × 400 m relay	Esporte Clube Pinheiros; Hederson Estefani; Eduardo Ribeiro dos Santos; Paulo André de Oliveira; Aldemir da Silva Júnior	3:08.15 min	AABLU; Bruno Rihan; Pedro Luiz de Oliveira; Eduardo Malczewski; Anderson Henriques	3:08.22 min	Orcampi Unimed; Alexander Russo; Wagner Cardoso; Jordan de Souza; Vitor Hugo de Miranda	40.21 s
High jump	Thiago Moura	2.27 m =SB	Fernando Ferreira	2.24 m	Elton dos Santos	2.17 m =PB
Pole vault	Abel Curtinove	5.30 m SB	Augusto Dutra de Oliveira	5.20 m SB	Lucca Torres	4.95 m
Long jump	Alexsandro Melo	8.16 m SB	Samory Fraga	7.93 m PB	Danylo Martins	7.67 m
Triple jump	Alexsandro Melo	16.48 m SB	Mateus de Sá	16.44 m SB	Jean Rosa	16.16 m SB
Shot put	Darlan Romani	21.11 m	Welington Silva	19.43 m SB	William Braido	19.23 m
Discus throw	Douglas Júnior	58.19 m	Wellinton Filho	56.70 m SB	Anderson Ferreira	51.91 m PB
Hammer throw	Allan Wolski	66.01 m	Luís da Silva	64.58 m	Ralf Oliveira	63.39 m
Javelin throw	Luiz Mauricio da Silva	76.10 m PB	Mauricio Filgueiras	72.18 m SB	Pedro Henrique Rodrigues	70.52 m
Decathlon	Felipe dos Santos	8364 pts PB	José Santana	7753 pts SB	Jordan Santos de Souza	7545 pts PB

=== Women ===
Event	Gold		Silver		Bronze	
100 metres	Vitória Cristina Rosa	11.41 s	Ana Carolina Azevedo	11.41 s	Rosângela Santos	11.46 s SB
200 metres	Ana Carolina Azevedo	23.01 s PB	Vitória Cristina Rosa	23.06 s SB	Gabriela Mourão	23.73 s
400 metres	Tiffani Marinho	52.95 s	Tabata de Carvalho	53.41 s	Maria de Sena	53.47 s SB
800 metres	Mayara Leite	2:07.29 min SB	Liliane dos Santos Mariano	2:07.63 min SB	Jaqueline Beatriz Weber	2:08.08 min SB
1500 metres	Tatiane Raquel da Silva	4:22.83 min SB	Jenifer do Nascimento Silva	4:24.81 min SB	Antônia Barros	4:27.60 min PB
5000 metres	Jenifer do Nascimento Silva	16:41.26 min SB	Tatiane Raquel da Silva	16:33.77 min SB	Simone Ferraz	16:41.61 min SB
10,000 metres	Jenifer do Nascimento Silva	34:20.64 min SB	Joziane Cardoso	35:52.95 min SB	Graziele Zarri	36:05.64 min PB
100 m hurdles	Ketiley Batista	13.21 s PB	Micaela Rosa de Mello	13.34 s SB	Adelly Santos	13.47 s
400 m hurdles	Bianca Amaro dos Santos	57.44 s	Chayenne da Silva	58.04 s SB	Wanessa Zavolski	58.36 s
3000 m s'chase	Tatiane Raquel da Silva	9:59.72 min SB	Simone Ferraz	10:21.43 min SB	Mirelle Leite	10:45.81 min PB
4 × 100 m relay	Esporte Clube Pinheiros; Bruna Farias; Rosângela Santos; Franciela Krasucki; Vitória Cristina Rosa	44.28 s	Orcampi Unimed; Jessica Honorato; Stephanie Guimaraes; Tiffani Marinho; Ana Carolina Azevedo	46.38 s	UCA; Gilailce de Assis; Lara da Silva; Caroline Tomaz; Micaela de Mello	46.46 s
4 × 400 m relay	Esporte Clube Pinheiros; Daysiellen Dias; Mayara Leite; Liliane Fernandes; Joelma Sousa	3:38.10 min	Orcampi Unimed; Ana Luísa Soares; Tiffani Marinho; Letícia da Silva; Marlene Santos	3:40.84	UCA; Caroline Tomaz; Gisele Aparecida da Silva; Micaela de Mello; Cristiane Silva	3:47.26
High jump	Sarah Fernandes	1.78 m =PB	Arielly Monteiro	1.78 m SB	Valdiléia Martins	1.75 m
Pole vault	Juliana Campos	4.20 m	Isabel de Quadros	4.00 m SB	Sabrina Santos	3.80 m SB
Long jump	Eliane Martins	6.42 m	Keila Costa	6.39 m SB	Leticia Oro Melo	6.39 m PB
Triple jump	Gabriele Sousa dos Santos	14.17 m PB	Keila Costa	13.83 m	Ketllyn Zanette	13.31 m PB
Shot put	Geisa Arcanjo	17.22 m	Livia Avancini	16.94 m SB	Milena Sens	16.52 m PB
Discus throw	Fernanda Martins	61.83 m	Andressa de Morais	58.03 m	Izabela da Silva	56.14 m
Hammer throw	Mariana Marcelino	63.73 m SB	Mveh Gracielle	59.83 m PB	Kerolayne da Silva	54.62 m PB
Javelin throw	Laila Ferrer e Silva	61.87 m SB	Jucilene de Lima	58.78 m	Rafaela Torres Gonçalves	54.45 m
Heptathlon	Raiane Vasconcelos	5759 pts PB	Vanessa Chefer	5472 pts SB	Jenifer Norberto	5409 pts PB
