= List of Brazilian records in athletics =

The following are the Brazilian national records in athletics, as maintained by the Brazilian Athletics Confederation, a.k.a. the Confederação Brasileira de Atletismo (CBAt).

== Outdoor ==
Key to tables: Awaiting ratification Record not kept by CBAt Not ratified or later rescinded by CBAt

=== Men ===
Event	Record	Athlete	Date	Meet	Place	Ref.
60 m	6.49 (−0.4 m/s)	Erik Cardoso	18 February 2026	Circuito Performance 1 - Short Track	São Paulo, Brazil	
60 m	6.49 (−0.3 m/s)	Erik Cardoso	18 February 2026	Circuito Performance 1 - Short Track	São Paulo, Brazil	
100 m	9.93 (+1.5 m/s)	Erik Cardoso	31 July 2025	Brazilian Championships	São Paulo, Brazil	
100 m	9.82 X (Note: The mark was not ratified after the Brazilian Athletics Federation reported a technical issue) (+1.9 m/s)	Erik Cardoso	11 April 2026	Sao Paulo Athletics Trophy Meet	São Paulo, Brazil	
150 m (straight)	14.91 (+1.4 m/s)	Bruno de Barros	31 March 2013	Mano a Mano Challenge	Rio de Janeiro, Brazil	
200 m	19.89 (−0.8 m/s)	Claudinei da Silva	11 September 1999		Munich, Germany	
300 m	32.05	Robson da Silva	17 September 1991		Jerez de la Frontera, Spain	
400 m	44.29	Sanderlei Parrela	26 August 1999	World Championships	Sevilla, Spain	
800 m	1:41.77	Joaquim Cruz	26 August 1984		Cologne, Germany	
1000 m	2:14.09	Joaquim Cruz	20 August 1984		Nice, France	
1500 m	3:33.25	Hudson de Souza	28 August 2005	IAAF Grand Prix	Rieti, Italy	
Mile	3:51.05	Hudson de Souza	29 July 2005	Bislett Games	Oslo, Norway	
Mile (road)	3:53.0 h	Joaquim Cruz	13 May 1984		Los Angeles, United States	
2000 m	5:03.34	Hudson de Souza	6 April 2002		Manaus, Brazil	
3000 m	7:39.70	Hudson de Souza	2 July 2002	Athletissima	Lausanne, Switzerland	
5000 m	13:19.43	Marílson dos Santos	8 June 2006		Kassel, Germany	
5 km (road)	13:30	Valdenor dos Santos	2 April 1995	Carlsbad 5000	Carlsbad, United States	
5 km (road)	13:22+	Marílson dos Santos	14 October 2007	World Road Running Championships	Udine, Italy	
10,000 m	27:28.12	Marílson dos Santos	2 June 2007		Neerpelt, Belgium	
10 km (road)	27:48+	Marílson dos Santos	14 October 2007	World Road Running Championships	Udine, Italy	
15 km (road)	42:15+	Marílson dos Santos	14 October 2007	World Road Running Championships	Udine, Italy	
10 miles (road)	46:19	Valdenor dos Santos	9 April 1995		Washington, D.C., United States	
20,000 m (track)	1:02:17.8	Elói Schleder	27 November 1976		São Paulo, Brazil	
20 km (road)	56:32+	Marílson dos Santos	14 October 2007	World Road Running Championships	Udine, Italy	
One hour	19263.20 m	Elói Schleder	27 November 1976		São Paulo, Brazil	
Half marathon	59:33	Marílson dos Santos	14 October 2007	World Road Running Championships	Udine, Italy	
25,000 m (track)	1:22.39.6+	Silvano Lima	27 April 2012		São Paulo, Brazil	
25 km (road)	1:15:02+	Vanderlei de Lima	7 December 2003	Fukuoka Marathon	Fukuoka, Japan	
25 km (road)	1:14:42+	André Luiz Ramos	20 April 1998	Boston Marathon	Boston, United States	
25 km (road)	1:14:17+ a	Marilson dos Santos	17 April 2011	London Marathon	London, United Kingdom	
30,000 m (track)	1:38:47.0	Silvano Lima	27 April 2012		São Paulo, Brazil	
30 km (road)	1:29:21+	Marilson dos Santos	17 April 2011	London Marathon	London, United Kingdom	
Marathon	2:04:51	Daniel Ferreira do Nascimento	17 April 2022	Seoul Marathon	Seoul, South Korea	
100 km (road)	6:18:09	Valmir Nunes	16 September 1995		Winschoten, Netherlands	
110 m hurdles	13.17 (+0.4 m/s)	Rafael Pereira	22 June 2022	Brazilian Championships	Rio de Janeiro, Brazil	
200 m hurdles (straight)	21.85 (+1.5 m/s)	Alison dos Santos	17 May 2025	Adidas Games	Atlanta, United States	
300 m hurdles	33.01	Alison dos Santos	16 May 2026	Shanghai Diamond League	Shaoxing/Keqiao, China	
400 m hurdles	45.80	Alison dos Santos	27 August 2026	Weltklasse Zürich	Zurich, Switzerland	
2000 m steeplechase	5:24.36+	Wander Moura	22 March 1995	Pan American Games	Mar del Plata, Argentina	
3000 m steeplechase	8:14.41	Wander Moura	22 March 1995	Pan American Games	Mar del Plata, Argentina	
High jump	2.32 m	Jessé de Lima	2 September 2008	Athletissima	Lausanne, Switzerland	
Pole vault	6.03 m	Thiago Braz	15 August 2016	Olympic Games	Rio de Janeiro, Brazil	
Long jump	8.40 m (+1.4 m/s)	Douglas de Souza	15 February 1995		São Paulo, Brazil	
Triple jump	17.90 m (+0.4 m/s)	Jadel Gregório	20 May 2007		Belém, Brazil	
Shot put	22.61 m	Darlan Romani	30 June 2019	IAAF Diamond League	Stanford, United States	
Discus throw	65.55 m	Ronald Julião	27 April 2013	UCSD Triton Invitational	La Jolla, United States	
Hammer throw	78.63 m	Wagner Domingos	19 June 2016	Slovenian Championships	Celje, Slovenia	
Javelin throw	91.00 m	Luiz Maurício da Silva	3 August 2025	Brazilian Championships	São Paulo, Brazil	
Decathlon	8393 pts	Carlos Eduardo Chinin	7–8 June 2013	Brazilian Championships	São Paulo, Brazil	
Decathlon	100m (wind) / Long jump (wind) / Shot put / High jump / 400m / 110m H (wind) / Discus / Pole vault / Javelin / 1500m; 10.85 (+0.5 m/s) / 7.55 m (+0.9 m/s) / 15.28 m / 2.04 m / 48.18 / 14.08 (+1.0 m/s) / 42.46 m / 4.90 m / 59.58 m / 4:34.77					
5 km walk (road)	19:25+	Caio Bonfim	1 June 2025	IV GP Internacional Madrid Marcha Silbo Telecom	Madrid, Spain	
10 km walk (road)	38:55	Caio Bonfim	1 June 2025	IV GP Internacional Madrid Marcha Silbo Telecom	Madrid, Spain	
20,000 m walk (track)	1:18:37.9 h	Caio Bonfim	31 July 2025	Brazilian Championships	São Paulo, Brazil	
20 km walk (road)	1:17:37	Caio Bonfim	16 February 2025	Japanese 20km Race Walking Championships	Kobe, Japan	
Half marathon walk (track)	1:24.30.93	Caio Bonfim	23 July 2026	Brazilian Championships	São Paulo, Brazil	
Half marathon walk (road)	1:21:44	Caio Bonfim	15 February 2026	Japanese Half Marathon Race Walking Championships	Kobe, Japan	
30 km walk (road)	2:16:38+	Caio Bonfim	19 August 2016	Olympic Games	Rio de Janeiro, Brazil	
35,000 m walk (track)	2:35:27.10	Max Goncalves dos Santos	30 June 2024	Brazilian Championships	Bragança Paulista, Brazil	
35 km walk (road)	2:25:14	Caio Bonfim	24 July 2022	World Championships	Eugene, United States	
50,000 m walk (track)	3:57:58.0	Claudio dos Santos	20 September 2008		Blumenau, Brazil	
50,000 m walk (track)	4:43.18	Claudio Fernandes Santos	6 September 1987		São Paulo, Brazil	
50 km walk (road)	3:47:02	Caio Bonfim	19 August 2016	Olympic Games	Rio de Janeiro, Brazil	
4 × 100 m relay	37.72	Brazil; Rodrigo do Nascimento; Vitor Hugo dos Santos; Derick Silva; Paulo André de Oliveira	5 October 2019	World Championships	Doha, Qatar	
4 × 200 m relay	1:25.82	Orcampi Unimed; Rodrigo de Souza Patativa; Rodrigo Bargas; Thiago Nascimento Evangelista; Delcio dos Santos Fraga	27 April 2012		São Paulo, Brazil	
4 × 400 m relay	2:58.56	Brazil; Eronilde de Araújo; Anderson Jorge dos Santos; Claudinei da Silva; Sanderlei Parrela	30 July 1999	Pan American Games	Winnipeg, Canada	
4 × 800 m relay	7:47.3 h	Esporte Clube Pinheiros; Carlos De José; Otto Neumann; Pedro Prado; José Azevedo	21 April 1965		São Paulo, Brazil	
4 × 1500 m relay	15:57.0 h	Brazil; Dario Santos; Antonio Limeira; Jaciel Silva; Antonio Venceslau	3 March 1996		São Paulo, Brazil	
Marathon road relay (Ekiden)	2:01.24	Brazil; Wander Moura (14:49); Vanderlei de Lima (29:10); Edgar de Oliveira (14:26); Delmir dos Santos (28:31); Tomix da Costa (14:26); Ronaldo da Costa (21:02)	14 April 1996		Copenhagen, Denmark	

=== Women ===
Event	Record	Athlete	Date	Meet	Place	Ref.
60 m	7.05 (±0.0 m/s)	Ana Carolina Azevedo	18 February 2026	Circuito Performance 1 - Short Track	São Paulo, Brazil	
100 m	10.91 (−0.2 m/s)	Rosângela Santos	6 August 2017	World Championships	London, United Kingdom	
150 m (bend)	17.50 (+2.0 m/s)	Ana Cláudia Lemos	31 August 2013	Amsterdam Open & Flame Games	Amsterdam, Netherlands	
150 m (straight)	16.75 NWI	Franciela Krasucki	31 March 2013	Mano a Mano Challenge	Rio de Janeiro, Brazil	
200 m	22.47 (+1.4 m/s)	Vitória Cristina Rosa	19 July 2022	World Championships	Eugene, Oregon	
300 m	36.90	Maria Magnólia Figueiredo	21 July 1996		Marietta, United States	
400 m	50.62	Magnólia Figueiredo	21 August 1990		Rovereto, Italy	
600 m	1:25.05	Luciana Mendes	3 August 2004		Naimette-Xhovémont, Belgium	
800 m	1:58.27	Luciana Mendes	30 July 1994		Hechtel-Eksel, Belgium	
1000 m	2.36.30	Luciana Mendes	25 August 1995	Memorial Van Damme	Brussels, Belgium	
1500 m	4:07.30	Juliana Paula dos Santos	5 June 2010	Ibero-American Championships	San Fernando, Spain	
Mile	4:30.05	Soraya Telles	9 June 1988		Bratislava, Czechoslovakia	
Mile (road)	4:41.13	Jaqueline Weber	17 August 2025	South American Road Running Championships	Rio de Janeiro, Brazil	
3000 m	9:02.37	Delirde Bernardi	4 July 1994		Linz, Austria	
5000 m	15:18.85	Simone Alves da Silva	20 May 2011	Grande Premio Internacional Caixa	São Paulo, Brazil	
5 km (road)	15:39	Carmem de Oliveira	6 June 1992	Freihofer's Run for Women	Albany, United States	
10,000 m	31:47.76	Carmem de Oliveira	21 August 1993	World Championships	Stuttgart, Germany	
10,000 m	31:16.56	Simone Alves da Silva	3 August 2011	Troféu Brasil de Atletismo	São Paulo, Brazil	
10 km (road)	32:03	Carmem de Oliveira	4 June 1994		New York City, United States	
10 km (road)	32:06	Carmem de Oliveira	11 October 1993		Boston, United States	
15 km (road)	48:38	Carmem de Oliveira	26 February 1994		Tampa, United States	
20 km (road)	69:27+	Nadir Sabino de Siqueira	4 October 1997	World Half Marathon Championships	Košice, Slovakia	
Half marathon	1:11:15	Silvana Pereira	13 July 1991		Florianópolis, Brazil	
Half marathon	1:09:31 a	Carmem de Oliveira	13 March 1994		Lisbon, Portugal	
25 km (road)	1:27:20	Marcia Narloch	6 May 1990		Berlin, Germany	
30 km (road)	1:46:46+	Carmem de Oliveira	21 November 1993		Tokyo, Japan	
Marathon	2:29:17	Adriana Aparecida da Silva	26 February 2012	Tokyo Marathon	Tokyo, Japan	
Marathon	2:27:41 a	Carmem de Oliveira	18 April 1994	Boston Marathon	Boston, United States	
100 km	7:20:22	Maria Venancio	8 August 1998		Cubatão, Brazil	
100 m hurdles	12.68 (+1.1 m/s)	Vitória Alves	30 May 2026	Ibero-American Championships	Lima, Peru	
100 m hurdles	12.57 (+1.5 m/s)	Vitória Alves	19 June 2026	40ème Meeting International Montgeron-Essonne	Montgeron, France	
400 m hurdles	55.15	Chayenne da Silva	25 June 2021	São Paulo State Championships	São Paulo, Brazil	
2000 m steeplechase	6:01.47	Tatiane Raquel da Silva	18 June 2023	Czeslaw Cybulski Memorial	Poznań, Poland	
3000 m steeplechase	9:24.38	Tatiane Raquel da Silva	11 June 2022	British Miler Club International	Watford, United Kingdom	
High jump	1.92 m	Orlane Maria dos Santos	11 August 1989		Bogotá, Colombia	
Pole vault	4.87 m	Fabiana Murer	3 July 2016	Brazilian Championships	São Bernardo do Campo, Brazil	
Long jump	7.26 m A (+1.8 m/s)	Maurren Maggi	26 June 1999	South American Championships	Bogotá, Colombia	
Triple jump	14.69 m A (+1.3 m/s)	Núbia Soares	8 July 2018		Sotteville-lès-Rouen, France	
Shot put	19.30 m	Elisângela Adriano	14 July 2001		Tunja, Colombia	
Discus throw	65.34 m	Andressa de Morais	26 June 2019	Leiria Meeting	Leiria, Portugal	
Discus throw	65.98 m X	Andressa de Morais	6 August 2019	Pan American Games	Lima, Peru	
Hammer throw	68.35 m	Mariana Grasielly Marcelino	23 June 2021	Meeting Internacional Rumo à Tóquio	Bragança Paulista, Brazil	
Javelin throw	62.89 m	Jucilene de Lima	11 October 2014	33rd Troféu Brasil	São Paulo, Brazil	
Heptathlon	6188 pts	Vanessa Spinola	2–3 July 2016	Brazilian Championships	São Bernardo do Campo, Brazil	
Heptathlon	100m H (wind) / High jump / Shot put / 200m (wind) / Long jump (wind) / Javelin / 800m; 14.23 (−1.1 m/s) / 1.81m / 13.07m / 24.16 (±0.0 m/s) / 6.15m (−2.1 m/s) / 45.83m / 2:16.01					
5000 m walk (track)	22:27.19	Cisiane Dutra Lopes	11 May 2011	Grand Prix Caixa Unifor	Fortaleza, Brazil	
5 km walk (road)	22:10+	Erica de Sena	7 May 2016	World Race Walking Team Championships	Rome, Italia	
10,000 m walk (track)	43:41.30	Erica de Sena	1 August 2014	Ibero-American Championships	São Paulo, Brazil	
10 km walk (road)	43:03	Erica de Sena	25 September 2017		Suzhou, China	
15 km walk (road)	1:05:34+	Erica de Sena	13 August 2017	World Championships	London, United Kingdom	
20,000 m walk (track)	1:30:51.97	Erica de Sena	29 May 2021	South American Championships	Guayaquil, Ecuador	
20 km walk (road)	1:26:59	Erica de Sena	13 August 2017	World Championships	London, United Kingdom	
35 km walk (road)	2:44:40	Viviane Lyra	24 August 2023	World Championships	Budapest, Hungary	
50 km walk (road)	4:34:55	Viviane Santana Lyra	21 April 2019	Pan American Race Walking Cup	Lázaro Cárdenas, Mexico	
4 × 100 m relay	42.29	Brazil; Evelyn dos Santos; Ana Claudia Silva; Franciela Krasucki; Rosângela Santos	18 August 2013	World Championships	Moscow, Russia	
4 × 400 m relay	3:26.68	BM&F Bovespa; Geisa Coutinho; Bárbara de Oliveira; Joelma Sousa; Jailma de Lima	7 August 2011	Troféu Brasil de Atletismo	São Paulo, Brazil	
4 × 800 m relay	9:29.10	C.R. Flamengo; Cristiane Barbosa; Cintia Fragoso; Lorena de Oliveira; Ana Paula Pereira	21 December 2000		Rio de Janeiro, Brazil	
Marathon road relay (Ekiden)	2:32:55	Ana de Souza (16.59); Maria Lúcia Vieira (37.01); Célia dos Santos (17.08); Rosângela Faria (37.03); Solange de Souza (17.42); Selma dos Reis (27.02)	18 April 1998	World Road Relay Championships	Manaus, Brazil	

=== Mixed ===
Event	Record	Athlete	Date	Meet	Place	Ref.
4 × 100 m relay	40.99	Erik Cardoso; Gabriela Mourão; Jorge Vides; Ana Carolina Azevedo	30 May 2026	Ibero-American Championships	Lima, Peru	
4 × 400 m relay	3:15.89	Brazil; Pedro Burmann; Tiffani Marinho; Tábata de Carvalho; Anderson Henriques	30 July 2021	Olympic Games	Tokyo, Japan	

== Indoor ==
=== Men ===
Event	Record	Athlete	Date	Meet	Place	Ref.
50 m	5.6 h	José Bento de Assis Junior	22 August 1942		São Paulo, Brazil	
50 m	5.75+	Vicente de Lima	10 February 2009	Meeting Pas de Calais	Liévin, France	
60 m	6.52	José Carlos Moreira	13 February 2009		Paris, France	
100 m	10.42	Vicente de Lima	4 February 2006	Tähtien kisat	Tampere, Finland	
200 m	20.65	Robson da Silva	26 February 1989		Sindelfingen, Germany	
300 m	32.19	Robson da Silva	24 February 1989	BW-Bank Meeting	Karlsruhe, Germany	
400 m	45.79	Matheus Lima	21 March 2025	World Championships	Nanjing, China	
400 m	45.71	Matheus Lima	20 March 2026	World Championships	Toruń, Poland	
600 m	1:15.90	Osmar dos Santos	31 January 2004		Boston, United States	
800 m	1:45.43	José Luíz Barbosa	8 March 1989		Piraeus, Greece	
1000 m	2:16.99	Joaquim Cruz	12 February 1989	Sparkassen Cup	Stuttgart, Germany	
1500 m	3:39.13	André Thiago do Rosário	8 February 2020	Copernicus Cup	Toruń, Poland	
Mile	3:56.26	Hudson de Souza	10 February 2001	Tyson Invitational	Fayetteville, United States	
3000 m	7.56.76	Adauto Domingues	4 March 1989	World Championships	Budapest, Hungary	
50 m hurdles	6.57	Redelen Melo dos Santos	28 January 2006		Groningen, Netherlands	
60 m hurdles	7.58	Rafael Pereira	4 February 2022	ISTAF Indoor	Berlin, Germany	
60 m hurdles	7.58	Rafael Pereira	9 February 2022		Mondeville, France	
60 m hurdles	7.58	Rafael Pereira	14 February 2022	Meeting de l’Eure	Val-de-Reuil, France	
60 m hurdles	7.58 A	Rafael Pereira	20 February 2022	South American Championships	Cochabamba, Bolivia	
60 m hurdles	7.58	Rafael Pereira	20 March 2022	World Championships	Belgrade, Serbia	
60 m hurdles	7.58 A	Eduardo de Deus	28 January 2024	South American Championships	Cochabamba, Bolivia	
High jump	2.31 m	Thiago Moura	20 March 2022	World Championships	Belgrade, Serbia	
Pole vault	5.95 m	Thiago Braz	20 March 2022	World Championships	Belgrade, Serbia	
Long jump	8.28 m	Mauro Vinícius da Silva	9 March 2012	World Championships	Istanbul, Turkey	
Long jump	8.28 m	Mauro Vinícius da Silva	8 March 2014	World Championships	Sopot, Poland	
Triple jump	17.56 m	Jadel Gregório	12 March 2006	World Championships	Moscow, Russia	
Shot put	22.53 m	Darlan Romani	19 March 2022	World Championships	Belgrade, Serbia	
Heptathlon	6010 pts	José Fernando Ferreira	22–23 March 2025	World Championships	Nanjing, China	
Heptathlon	60m / Long jump / Shot put / High jump / 60m H / Pole vault / 1000m; 6.94 / 7.34 m / 14.50 m / 1.92 m / 7.96 / 5.20 m / 2:50.93					
5000 m walk	19:28.87	Sérgio Galdino	24 February 1989	World Championships	Toronto, Canada	
4 × 400 m relay	3:10.50	Brazil; Claudinei da Silva; Osmar dos Santos; Flavio Godoy; Geraldo Maranhão	8 March 1997	World Championships	Paris, France	

=== Women ===
Event	Record	Athlete	Date	Meet	Place	Ref.
60 m	7.09 A (Note: Indoor best; outdoor mark ratified as absolute record)	Ana Carolina Azevedo	28 February 2026	South American Championships	Cochabamba, Bolivia	
200 m	23.71	Magnólia Figueiredo	4 March 1989	World Championships	Budapest, Hungary	
300 m	39.0 h A	Thais Zambrzycki	10 February 1979		Pocatello, United States	
400 m	52.54	Letícia de Souza	10 February 2017	Tyson Invitational	Fayetteville, United States	
800 m	2:00.98	Fabiane dos Santos	15 February 2001	GE Galan	Stockholm, Sweden	
1500 m	5:45.85	Dolores Alves De Morini	17 January 2015		Valencia, Spain	
3000 m	12:03.90	Dolores Alves De Morini	17 January 2015		Valencia, Spain	
50 m hurdles	7.3 h	Themis Zambrzycki	17 February 1979		Logan, United States	
60 m hurdles	8.08	Maíla Machado	11 March 2006	World Championships	Moscow, Russia	
High jump	1.90 m	Orlane Maria dos Santos	14 February 1992		Wuppertal, Germany	
Pole vault	4.83 m	Fabiana Murer	7 February 2015	Perche Elite Tour	Nevers, France	
Long jump	6.89 m	Maurren Maggi	9 March 2008	World Championships	Valencia, Spain	
Triple jump	14.17 m A	Regiclecia da Silva	23 February 2025	South American Championships	Cochabamba, Bolivia	
Shot put	18.31 m	Elisângela Adriano	8 March 1997	World Championships	Paris, France	
Shot put	18.33 m	Elisângela Adriano	24 February 1999		Piraeus, Greece	
Pentathlon	4292 pts	Vanessa Spínola	14 February 2016	European Permit Combined Events Meeting	Tallinn, Estonia	
Pentathlon	60m H / High jump / Shot put / Long jump / 800m; 8.81 / 1.75 m / 13.62 m / 5.87 m / 2:18.25					
3000 m walk						
4 × 400 m relay	3:33.78	Atletismo BM & F Coelho Neto; Almirao; P. dos Santos; L. de Oliveira	24 September 2006		São Paulo, Brazil	
