= Brazil at the 2015 World Championships in Athletics =

- WA code: BRA
- National federation: Confederação Brasileira de Atletismo
- Website: www.cbat.org.br

in Beijing
- Competitors: 53
- Medals Ranked 25th: Gold 0 Silver 1 Bronze 0 Total 1

World Championships in Athletics appearances (overview)
- 1983; 1987; 1991; 1993; 1995; 1997; 1999; 2001; 2003; 2005; 2007; 2009; 2011; 2013; 2015; 2017; 2019; 2022; 2023; 2025

Brazil competed at the 2015 World Championships in Athletics in Beijing, China, from 22 to 30 August 2015.

== Medalists ==
Medal	Athlete	Event	Date
Silver	Fabiana Murer	Pole vault	26 August

== Results ==
(q – qualified, NM – no mark, SB – season best, AR - Area Record)

=== Men ===
Track and road events

Athlete	Event	Heat		Semifinal		Final	
Athlete	Event	Result	Rank	Result	Rank	Result	Rank
Aldemir da Silva Junior	200 metres	20.59	36	Did not advance			
Bruno de Barros	200 metres	20.42	26	Did not advance			
Hederson Estefani	400 metres	45.36 SB	30	Did not advance			
Hugo de Sousa	400 metres	45.42 SB	31	Did not advance			
Cleiton Abrão	800 metres	1:49.79	42	Did not advance			
Solonei da Silva	Marathon	—N/a				2:19:20	18
Gilberto Lopes	Marathon	—N/a				DNF	
Edmilson Santana	Marathon	—N/a				DNF	
Éder Antônio Souza	110 metres hurdles	13.96	34	Did not advance			
Jonathan Mendes	110 metres hurdles	13.86	31	Did not advance			
João Vítor de Oliveira	110 metres hurdles	13.57	22 q	13.45 PB	18	Did not advance	
José Carlos Moreira; Bruno de Barros; Gustavo dos Santos; Aldemir da Silva Junior	4 × 100 metres relay	DNF		—N/a		Did not advance	
Wagner Cardoso; Hederson Estefani; Hugo de Sousa; Pedro Luiz de Oliveira	4 × 400 metres relay	3:01.05	12	—N/a		Did not advance	
Caio Bonfim	20 kilometres walk	—N/a				1:20:44	6
Mário dos Santos	50 kilometres walk	—N/a				DNF	

Field events

Athlete	Event	Qualification		Final	
Athlete	Event	Distance	Position	Distance	Position
Higor Alves	Long jump	7.60	27	Did not advance	
Alexsandro de Melo	Long jump	NM		Did not advance	
Jean-Cassimiro Rosa	Triple jump	15.97	26	Did not advance	
Talles Frederico Silva	High jump	2.17	39	Did not advance	
Augusto de Oliveira	Pole vault	5.70	11 Q	5.65	9
Thiago Braz da Silva	Pole vault	5.65	19	Did not advance	
Fábio Gomes da Silva	Pole vault	5.25	33	Did not advance	
Darlan Romani	Shot put	19.86	15	Did not advance	
Ronald Julião	Discus throw	61.02	21	Did not advance	
Wagner Domingos	Hammer throw	71.82	22	Did not advance	
Júlio César de Oliveira	Javelin throw	79.81	15	Did not advance	

Combined events – Decathlon

Athlete	Event	100 m	LJ	SP	HJ	400 m	110H	DT	PV	JT	1500 m	Final	Rank
Luiz Alberto de Araújo	Result	10.92	6.94	14.84	DNS	–	–	–	–	–	–	DNF	
Luiz Alberto de Araújo	Points	878	799	780	0	–	–	–	–	–	–	DNF	
Felipe dos Santos	Result	10.53	7.54 SB	13.61	2.01	47.89 SB	14.64	36.66	4.80 PB	DNS	–	DNF	
Felipe dos Santos	Points	968	945	704	813	914	894	597	849	0	–	DNF	

=== Women ===
Track and road events

Athlete	Event	Heat		Semifinal		Final	
Athlete	Event	Result	Rank	Result	Rank	Result	Rank
Rosângela Santos	100 metres	11.14	14 Q	11.07	12	Did not advance	
Rosângela Santos	200 metres	23.01	18 Q	22.87	13	Did not advance	
Vitória Cristina Rosa	200 metres	23.32	37	Did not advance			
Geisa Coutinho	400 metres	52.72	37	Did not advance			
Flávia de Lima	800 metres	2:01.76	32	Did not advance			
Adelly Santos	100 metres hurdles	13.29	30	Did not advance			
Fabiana Moraes	100 metres hurdles	13.35	32	Did not advance			
Michele Cristina das Chagas	Marathon	—N/a				2:49:28	47
Roselaine Benites	Marathon	—N/a				DNF	
Franciela Krasucki; Rosângela Santos; Vitória Cristina Rosa; Bruna Farias	4 × 100 metres relay	43.15	9	—N/a		Did not advance	
Cisiane Lopes	20 kilometres walk	—N/a				1:36:06	29
Érica de Sena	20 kilometres walk	—N/a				1:30:06	6

Field events

Athlete	Event	Qualification		Final	
Athlete	Event	Distance	Position	Distance	Position
Tânia da Silva	Long jump	6.18	28	Did not advance	
Eliane Martins	Long jump	NM		Did not advance	
Keila Costa	Long jump	6.32	26	Did not advance	
Keila Costa	Triple jump	14.03	10 q	13.90	12
Núbia Soares	Triple jump	13.52 SB	22	Did not advance	
Fabiana Murer	Pole vault	4.55	1q	4.85 =AR	2nd place, silver medalist(s)
Geisa Arcanjo	Shot put	17.42	15	Did not advance	
Keely Medeiros	Shot put	15.17	24	Did not advance	
Andressa de Morais	Discus throw	59.08	19	Did not advance	
Fernanda Martins	Discus throw	56.74	26	Did not advance	
Jucilene de Lima	Javelin throw	59.49	25	Did not advance	

Combined events – Heptathlon

Athlete	Event	100H	HJ	SP	200 m	LJ	JT	800 m	Final	Rank
Vanessa Spínola	Result	14.28	1.68	13.44	24.73	5.40	43.75	2:21.81	5647	26
Vanessa Spínola	Points	939	830	757	912	671	739	799	5647	26

== See also ==
- Brazil at the World Championships in Athletics
