= Brazil at the World Athletics Championships =

Highlights, in list form, of Brazil's participation in World Athletics Championships

- WA code: BRA
- National federation: Brazilian Athletics Confederation
- Website: www.cbat.org.br
- Medals Ranked 47th: Gold 3 Silver 8 Bronze 8 Total 19

World Athletics Championships appearances (overview)
- 1983; 1987; 1991; 1993; 1995; 1997; 1999; 2001; 2003; 2005; 2007; 2009; 2011; 2013; 2015; 2017; 2019; 2022; 2023; 2025

Brazil has participated in all the World Athletics Championships since the beginning in 1983. Brazil is 47th on the all time medal table. Brazil's first World Championships medal was a bronze medal won by Joaquim Cruz in the Men's 800 metres in 1983. Fabiana Murer won Brazil's first gold medal and the first woman's medal in the pole vault in 2011. Alison dos Santos was the first man to win a gold medal in the 400 metres hurdles in 2022. Caio Bonfim has the most medals with four (one gold, one silver and two bronze).

== Medalists ==
Medal	Name	Year	Event
Bronze	Joaquim Cruz	1983 Helsinki	Men's 800 metres
Bronze	Zequinha Barbosa	1987 Rome	Men's 800 metres
Silver	Zequinha Barbosa	1991 Tokyo	Men's 800 metres
Bronze	Luíz Antônio dos Santos	1995 Gothenburg	Men's marathon
Bronze	Claudinei Quirino	1997 Athens	Men's 200 metres
Silver	Claudinei Quirino	1999 Seville	Men's 200 metres
Silver	Sanderlei Parrela	1999 Seville	Men's 400 metres
Bronze	André Domingos, Claudinei Quirino, Édson Luciano Ribeiro, Raphael de Oliveira	1999 Seville	Men's 4 × 100 metres relay
Silver	André Domingos, Cláudio Roberto Souza, Édson Luciano Ribeiro, Vicente Lenílson	2003 Saint-Denis	Men's 4 × 100 metres relay
Silver	Jadel Gregório	2007 Osaka	Men's triple jump
Gold	Fabiana Murer	2011 Daegu	Women's pole vault
Silver	Fabiana Murer	2015 Beijing	Women's pole vault
Bronze	Caio Bonfim	2017 London	Men's 20 km walk
Gold	Alison dos Santos	2022 Eugene	Men's 400 metres hurdles
Bronze	Leticia Oro Melo	2022 Eugene	Women's long jump
Bronze	Caio Bonfim	2023 Budapest	Men's 20 km walk
Silver	Caio Bonfim	2025 Tokyo	Men's 35 km walk
Silver	Alison dos Santos	2025 Tokyo	Men's 400 metres hurdles
Gold	Caio Bonfim	2025 Tokyo	Men's 20 km walk

== Medal tables ==
=== By championships ===
Year	Gold	Silver	Bronze	Total
2025 Tokyo	1	2	0	3
2022 Oregon	1	0	1	2
2011 Daegu	1	0	0	1
1999 Seville	0	2	1	3
1991 Tokyo	0	1	0	1
2003 Saint-Denis	0	1	0	1
2007 Osaka	0	1	0	1
2015 Beijing	0	1	0	1
1983 Helsinki	0	0	1	1
1987 Rome	0	0	1	1
1995 Gothenburg	0	0	1	1
1997 Athens	0	0	1	1
2017 London	0	0	1	1
2023 Budapest	0	0	1	1
1993 Stuttgart	0	0	0	0
2001 Edmonton	0	0	0	0
2005 Helsinki	0	0	0	0
2009 Berlin	0	0	0	0
2013 Moscow	0	0	0	0
2019 Doha	0	0	0	0
Totals (20 entries)	3	8	8	19

=== By event ===
Event	Gold	Silver	Bronze	Total
Jumping	1	2	1	4
Racewalking	1	1	2	4
Hurdling	1	1	0	2
Sprinting	0	2	1	3
Middle-distance running	0	1	2	3
Relay	0	1	1	2
Long-distance running	0	0	1	1
Totals (7 entries)	3	8	8	19

=== By gender ===
Gender	Gold	Silver	Bronze	Total
Men	2	7	7	16
Women	1	1	1	3
Totals (2 entries)	3	8	8	19

== Best Finishes ==
=== Men ===
Event	Gold	Silver	Bronze	Total	Best finish
Men's 100 metres	0	0	0	0	7th (1991)
Men's 200 metres	0	1	1	2	(silver) (1999)
Men's 400 metres	0	1	0	1	(silver) (1999)
Men's 800 metres	0	1	2	3	(silver) (1991)
Men's 1500 metres	0	0	0	0	14th (2001)
Men's 5000 metres	0	0	0	0	24th (1991, 1993)
Men's 10000 metres	0	0	0	0	22nd (1991)
Men's 110 m hurdles	0	0	0	0	5th (2003)
Men's 400 m hurdles	1	1	0	2	(gold) (2022)
Men's 3000 m steeplechase	0	0	0	0	17th (1997)
Men's 4 × 100 metres relay	0	1	1	2	(silver) (2003)
Men's 4 × 400 metres relay	0	0	0	0	4th (2001)
Men's Marathon	0	0	1	1	(bronze) (1995)
Men's 20 km walk	1	0	2	3	(gold) (2025)
Men's 35 km walk	0	1	0	1	(silver) (2025)
Men's 50 km walk	0	0	0	0	29th (1993)
Men's High jump	0	0	0	0	13th (2007)
Men's Pole vault	0	0	0	0	4th (2022)
Men's Long jump	0	0	0	0	5th (1997, 2013)
Men's Triple jump	0	1	0	0	(silver) (2007)
Men's Shot put	0	0	0	0	4th (2019)
Men's Discus throw	0	0	0	0	21st (2015)
Men's Javelin throw	0	0	0	0	15th (2015)
Men's Hammer throw	0	0	0	0	19th (2017)
Men's Decathlon	0	0	0	0	6th (2013)

=== Women ===
Event	Gold	Silver	Bronze	Total	Best finish
Women's 100 metres	0	0	0	0	7th (2017)
Women's 200 metres	0	0	0	0	11th (2005, 2011)
Women's 400 metres	0	0	0	0	14th (2011)
Women's 800 metres	0	0	0	0	9th (1997)
Women's 1500 metres	0	0	0	0	28th (1993)
Women's 5000 metres	0	0	0	0	x
Women's 10000 metres	0	0	0	0	11th (1993)
Women's 100 m hurdles	0	0	0	0	15th (2003)
Women's 400 m hurdles	0	0	0	0	28th (2011)
Women's 3000 m steeplechase	0	0	0	0	23rd (2022)
Women's 4 × 100 metres relay	0	0	0	0	5th (2009)
Women's 4 × 400 metres relay	0	0	0	0	Finalist (2005)
Women's Marathon	0	0	0	0	30th (2019)
Women's 20 km walk	0	0	0	0	4th (2017, 2019)
Women's 35 km walk	0	0	0	0	4th (2023)
Women's High jump	0	0	0	0	14th (1991)
Women's Pole vault	1	1	0	2	(gold) (2011)
Women's Long jump	0	0	1	1	(bronze) (2022)
Women's Triple jump	0	0	0	0	7th (2007)
Women's Shot put	0	0	0	0	9th (2003, 2017)
Women's Discus throw	0	0	0	0	6th (2019)
Women's Javelin throw	0	0	0	0	8th (2023)
Women's Hammer throw	0	0	0	0	29th (2022)
Women's Heptathlon	0	0	0	0	24th (2017)

== See also ==
- Brazil at the Olympics
- Brazil at the Pan American Games
- Brazil at the World Indoor Championships in Athletics
