= Brazil at the 2013 World Championships in Athletics =

- WA code: BRA
- National federation: Confederação Brasileira de Atletismo
- Website: www.cbat.org.br

in Moscow
- Competitors: 32
- Medals: Gold 0 Silver 0 Bronze 0 Total 0

World Championships in Athletics appearances (overview)
- 1983; 1987; 1991; 1993; 1995; 1997; 1999; 2001; 2003; 2005; 2007; 2009; 2011; 2013; 2015; 2017; 2019; 2022; 2023; 2025

Brazil competed at the 2013 World Championships in Athletics in Moscow, Russia, from 10–18 August 2013. A team of 32 athletes were announced to represent the country in the event.

== Results ==
(q – qualified, NM – no mark, SB – season best)

=== Men ===
Track and road events

Athlete	Event	Preliminaries		Heats		Semifinals		Final	
Athlete	Event	Time	Rank	Time	Rank	Time	Rank	Time	Rank
Aldemir da Silva Junior	200 metres			20.73	26	did not advance			
Bruno de Barros	200 metres			20.60	=19	did not advance			
Anderson Henriques	400 metres			45.13	4 Q	44.95	8 q	45.03	8
Kleberson Davide	800 metres			1:48.28	35	did not advance			
Mahau Suguimati	400 metres hurdles			50.00	22 q	50.27	20	did not advance	
Pedro Luiz de Oliveira; Wagner Cardoso; Anderson Henriques; Hugo de Sousa	4 × 400 metres relay			3:01.09	6 q			3:02.19	7
Solonei da Silva	Marathon							2:11:40	6
Paulo Roberto Paula	Marathon							2:11:40	7
Caio Bonfim	20 kilometres walk							DQ	
Mário dos Santos	50 kilometres walk							4:06:12	43

Field events

Athlete	Event	Preliminaries		Final	
Athlete	Event	Width Height	Rank	Width Height	Rank
Mauro Vinicius da Silva	Long jump	7.92	11 q	8.24	5
Jefferson Sabino	Triple jump	16.49	16	did not advance	
Thiago Braz da Silva	Pole vault	5.40	=14	did not advance	
Augusto de Oliveira	Pole vault	5.55	6 q	5.65	11
João Gabriel Sousa	Pole vault	5.25	=29	did not advance	
Ronald Juliao	Discus throw	59.36	22	did not advance	

Decathlon

Carlos Chinin	Decathlon			
Carlos Chinin	Event	Results	Points	Rank
	100 m	10.78	910	7
	Long jump	7.54	945	6
	Shot put	14.49	758	10
	High jump	1.96	767	=19
	400 m	48.80	871	=14
	110 m hurdles	14.05	968	4
	Discus throw	45.84	784	7
	Pole vault	5.10	941	8
	Javelin throw	59.98	738	16
	1500 m	4:36.01	706	16
Total			8388	6

=== Women ===
Track and road events

Athlete	Event	Preliminaries		Heats		Semifinals		Final	
Athlete	Event	Time	Rank	Time	Rank	Time	Rank	Time	Rank
Franciela Krasucki	100 metres			11.17	9 Q	11.34	15	did not advance	
Ana Cláudia Silva	100 metres			11.08	4 Q	11.25	11	did not advance	
Franciela Krasucki	200 metres			23.20	24	did not advance			
Ana Cláudia Silva	200 metres			23.31	30	did not advance			
Joelma Sousa	400 metres			53.01	29	did not advance			
Evelyn dos Santos; Ana Cláudia Silva; Franciela Krasucki; Vanda Gomes; Rosângela Santos*	4 × 100 metres relay			42.29	4 Q			DNF	

Field events

Athlete	Event	Preliminaries		Final	
Athlete	Event	Width Height	Rank	Width Height	Rank
Keila Costa	Triple jump	13.82	13	did not advance	
Karla Rosa da Silva	Pole vault	4.30	19	did not advance	
Fabiana Murer	Pole vault	4.55	=9 q	4.65	=5
Geisa Arcanjo	Shot put	17.55	18	did not advance	
Fernanda Martins	Discus throw	NM		did not advance	
Jucilene de Lima	Javelin throw	55.18	26	did not advance	

== See also ==
- Brazil at the World Championships in Athletics
