= Brazil at the 2011 World Championships in Athletics =

- WA code: BRA
- National federation: Confederação Brasileira de Atletismo
- Website: www.cbat.org.br

in Daegu
- Competitors: 26
- Medals Ranked 11th: Gold 1 Silver 0 Bronze 0 Total 1

World Championships in Athletics appearances (overview)
- 1983; 1987; 1991; 1993; 1995; 1997; 1999; 2001; 2003; 2005; 2007; 2009; 2011; 2013; 2015; 2017; 2019; 2022; 2023; 2025

Brazil competed at the 2011 World Championships in Athletics from August 27 to September 4 in Daegu, South Korea.

== Team selection ==
The Brazilian team for the competition has been announced. The team will be led by World Indoor Pole Vault champion Fabiana Murer and Olympic Long Jump champion Maurren Maggi. The final team on the entry list comprises the names of 31 athletes.

The following athletes appeared on the preliminary Entry List, but not on the Official Start List of the specific event, resulting in total number of 26 competitors:

KEY:	Did not participate	Competed in another event

	Event	Athlete
Men	4 x 100 metres relay	Carlos Roberto de Moraes Jr.
Men	4 x 100 metres relay	Ailson Feitosa
Women	400 metres	Jailma de Lima
Women	5000 metres	Simone da Silva
Women	4 x 100 metres relay	Rosemar Maria Coelho Fortunato
Women	4 x 100 metres relay	Geisa Aparecida Coutinho
Women	4 x 400 metres relay	Aline dos Santos

== Medalists ==
The following competitor from Brazil won a medal at the Championships

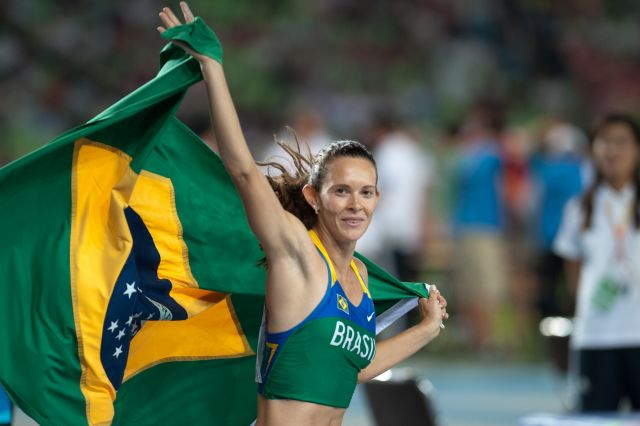
Fabiana Murer won the gold medal in Women's Pole Vault at this year's championships

Medal	Athlete	Event
Gold	Fabiana Murer	Pole vault

== Results ==
=== Men ===
Athlete	Event	Preliminaries		Heats		Semifinals		Final	
Athlete	Event	Time Width Height	Rank	Time Width Height	Rank	Time Width Height	Rank	Time Width Height	Rank
Nilson André	100 metres			10.54	34	Did not advance			
Bruno Lins de Barros	200 metres			20.63	11 Q	20.54	7 q	20.31	6
Sandro Viana	200 metres			20.62	10 Q	DSQ		Did not advance	
Nilson André	200 metres			20.93	31	Did not advance			
Kleberson Davide	800 metres			1:46.06	4 Q	1:45.06	7	Did not advance	
Lutimar Paes	800 metres			1:48.97	34	Did not advance			
Fernando da Silva	800 metres			1:51.58	38	Did not advance			
Mahau Suguimati	400 m hurdles			49.74	20 q	50.89	23	Did not advance	
Diego Cavalcanti; Sandro Viana; Nilson André; Bruno Lins de Barros	4 x 100 metres relay			DSQ				Did not advance	
Caio Bonfim	20 kilometres walk							1:24:29	22
Moacir Zimmermann	20 kilometres walk							DSQ	
Jefferson Sabino	Triple jump	16.51	17					Did not advance	
Fabio Gomes da Silva	Pole vault	5.65	6 q					5.65	8

Decathlon

Luiz Alberto de Araújo	Decathlon			
Luiz Alberto de Araújo	Event	Results	Points	Rank
	100 m	10.71 SB	926	4
	Long jump	6.74	753	26
	Shot put	14.77	776	13
	High jump	1.90	714	26
	400 m	48.48 PB	886	7
	110 m hurdles	14.25 SB	942	5
	Discus throw	46.46	797	9
	Pole vault	4.70 PB	819	17
	Javelin throw	54.38	654	19
	1500 m	4:47.29	635	16
Final			7902	16

=== Women ===
Reigning World indoor champion Fabiana Murer won the gold medal in the Women's Pole Vault competition clearing 4.85m in the first attempt equalling her Brazilian and Area record.

Athlete	Event	Preliminaries		Heats		Semifinals		Final	
Athlete	Event	Time Width Height	Rank	Time Width Height	Rank	Time Width Height	Rank	Time Width Height	Rank
Ana Claudia Silva	100 metres			11.26	15 Q	11.55	20	Did not advance	
Rosângela Santos	100 metres			11.36	26 Q	11.61	24	Did not advance	
Ana Claudia Silva	200 metres			22.96	16 Q	22.97	11	Did not advance	
Vanda Gomes	200 metres			23.70	28	Did not advance			
Geisa Aparecida Coutinho	400 metres			52.15	13 q	51.87	14	Did not advance	
Jailma de Lima	400 m hurdles			57.21	28	Not advance			
Ana Claudia Silva; Vanda Gomes; Franciela Krasucki; Rosângela Santos	4 x 100 metres relay			42.92 AR	8 q			43.10	8
Geisa Aparecida Coutinho; Bárbara de Oliveira; Joelma Sousa; Jailma de Lima	4 x 400 metres relay			3:32.43	18			Did not advance	
Maurren Higa Maggi	Long jump	6.86	1 Q					6.17	11
Keila Costa	Long jump	6.26	24					Did not advance	
Keila Costa	Triple jump	14.15	12 q					13.72	12
Fabiana Murer	Pole vault	4.55	1 Q					4.85 AR	1st place, gold medalist(s)
Andressa de Morais	Discus throw	57.93	18					Did not advance	
Elisângela Adriano	Discus throw	56.45	22					Did not advance	

== See also ==
- Brazil at the World Championships in Athletics
