= Roselaine Benites =

Brazilian long-distance runner

Personal information
- Born: 27 May 1981 (age 45)

Sport
- Country: Brazil
- Sport: Track and field
- Event: long-distance running
- Updated on 2 September 2015

Roselaine Benites (born 27 May 1981) is a Brazilian long-distance runner. She competed in the marathon event at the 2015 World Championships in Athletics in Beijing, China.

== See also ==
- Brazil at the 2015 World Championships in Athletics
