= Edmilson Santana =

Brazilian long-distance runner

Personal information
- Born: 7 February 1987 (age 39)

Sport
- Country: Brazil
- Sport: Track and field
- Event: long-distance running
- Updated on 29 August 2015

Edmilson Santana (born 7 February 1987) is a male Brazilian long-distance runner. He competed in the marathon event at the 2015 World Championships in Athletics in Beijing, China, but did not finish.

== See also ==
- Brazil at the 2015 World Championships in Athletics
