= Brazil at the 2009 World Championships in Athletics =

- WA code: BRA

in Berlin
- Competitors: 30 (19 men, 11 women)
- Medals: Gold 0 Silver 0 Bronze 0 Total 0

World Championships in Athletics appearances (overview)
- 1983; 1987; 1991; 1993; 1995; 1997; 1999; 2001; 2003; 2005; 2007; 2009; 2011; 2013; 2015; 2017; 2019; 2022; 2023; 2025

Brazil competed at the 2009 World Championships in Athletics from 15–23 August in Berlin.

== Team selection ==
Track and road events

Event	Athletes	
Event	Men	Women
100 metres	Vicente de Lima; Basilio de Moraes; José Carlos Moreira	Lucimar Aparecida de Moura
200 metres	Sandro Viana	
800 metres	Kleberson Davide; Fabiano Peçanha	
400 metre hurdles	Mahau Suguimati	
3000 m steeplechase		Sabine Heitling
4 x 100 metres relay	TBA	TBA
4 x 400 metres relay		TBA
20 km race walk	José Alessandro Bagio; Moacir Zimmermann	Alessandra Picagevicz; Tania Regina Spindler
50 km race walk	Mário dos Santos	
Marathon	Adriano Bastos; José de Souza; Marilson dos Santos	Maria Zeferina Baldaia; Adriana Aparecida da Silva

Field and combined events

Event	Athletes	
Event	Men	Women
High jump	Jessé de Lima	
Long jump		Keila Costa; Maurren Higa Maggi
Triple jump	Leonardo Elisário dos Santos; Jadel Gregório; Jefferson Jabino	Gisele de Oliveira
Pole vault	Fábio Gomes da Silva	Fabiana Murer
Javelin throw	Júlio César de Oliveira	
Discus throw		Elisângela Adriano

== See also ==
- Brazil at the World Championships in Athletics
