= 2022 World Athletics Championships – Women's long jump =

Women's long jump at the 2022 World Championships
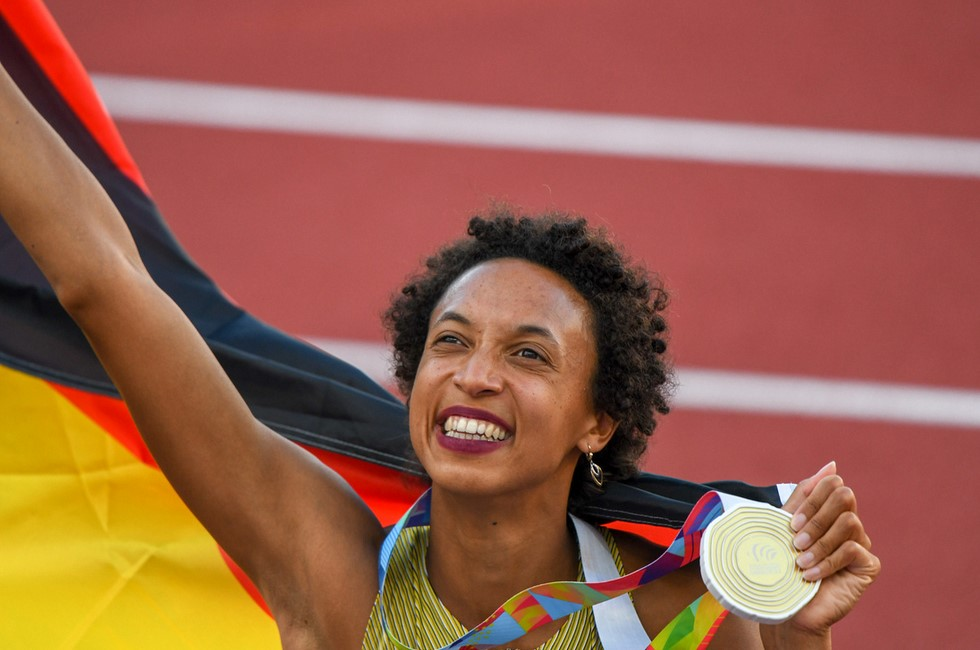
- Malaika Mihambo shortly after the final.
- Venue: Hayward Field
- Dates: 23 July (qualification); 24 July (final)
- Competitors: 30 from 20 nations
- Winning distance: 7.12

Medalists
gold medal	Malaika Mihambo	Germany
silver medal	Ese Brume	Nigeria
bronze medal	Leticia Oro Melo	Brazil

Video on YouTube Official Video

The women's long jump at the 2022 World Athletics Championships was held at the Hayward Field in Eugene on 23 and 24 July 2022.

== Records ==
Before the competition records were as follows:

Record	Athlete & Nat.	Perf.	Location	Date
World record	Galina Chistyakova (URS)	7.52 m	Leningrad, Soviet Union	11 June 1988
Championship record	Jackie Joyner-Kersee (USA)	7.36 m	Rome, Italy	4 September 1987
World Leading	Brooke Buschkuehl (AUS)	7.13 m	Chula Vista, United States	9 July 2022
African Record	Ese Brume (NGR)	7.17 m	Chula Vista, United States	29 May 2021
Asian Record	Yao Weili (CHN)	7.01 m	Jinan, China	4 June 1993
North, Central American and Caribbean record	Jackie Joyner-Kersee (USA)	7.49 m	New York, United States	22 May 1994
North, Central American and Caribbean record	Jackie Joyner-Kersee (USA)	7.49 m	Sestriere, Italy	31 July 1994
South American Record	Maurren Higa Maggi (BRA)	7.26 m	Bogotá, Colombia	25 June 1999
European Record	Galina Chistyakova (URS)	7.52 m	Leningrad, Soviet Union	11 June 1988
Oceanian record	Brooke Buschkuehl (AUS)	7.13 m	Chula Vista, United States	9 July 2022

== Qualification standard ==
The standard to qualify automatically for entry was 6.82 m.

== Schedule ==
The event schedule, in local time (UTC−7), was as follows:

Date	Time	Round
23 July	12:00	Qualification
24 July	17:50	Final

== Results ==
=== Qualification ===
The qualification round took place on 23 July, in two groups, both starting at 12:00. Athletes attaining a mark of at least 6.75 metres ( Q ) or at least the 12 best performers ( q ) qualified for the final.

Rank	Group	Name	Nationality	Round			Mark	Notes
Rank	Group	Name	Nationality	1	2	3	Mark	Notes
1	A	Quanesha Burks	United States	6.57	6.66	6.86	6.86	Q, SB
2	B	Malaika Mihambo	Germany	6.84			6.84	Q
3	A	Ese Brume	Nigeria	6.49	x	6.82	6.82	Q
4	B	Maryna Bekh-Romanchuk	Ukraine	6.81			6.81	Q
5	A	Khaddi Sagnia	Sweden	6.78			6.78	Q
6	A	Brooke Buschkuehl	Australia	6.76			6.76	Q
7	B	Tiffany Flynn	United States	6.73	6.47	x	6.73	q
8	B	Ruth Usoro	Nigeria	x	6.25	6.69	6.69	q
9	B	Jazmin Sawyers	Great Britain & N.I.	x	6.48	6.68	6.68	q, SB
10	A	Lorraine Ugen	Great Britain & N.I.	6.32	6.68	-	6.68	q
11	B	Ivana Vuleta	Serbia	x	x	6.65	6.65	q
12	B	Leticia Oro Melo	Brazil	x	x	6.64	6.64	q, SB
13	A	Jasmine Moore	United States	6.60	6.44	6.36	6.60	
14	A	Larissa Iapichino	Italy	x	x	6.60	6.60	
15	A	Evelise Veiga	Portugal	6.54	6.41	x	6.54	
16	A	Fátima Diame	Spain	6.54	x	x	6.54	
17	B	Christabel Nettey	Canada	6.47	6.45	6.50	6.50	
18	B	Deborah Acquah	Ghana	x	x	6.46	6.46	
19	B	Tyra Gittens	Trinidad and Tobago	6.22	6.44	x	6.44	
20	B	Sumire Hata	Japan	x	6.39	6.38	6.39	
21	A	Eliane Martins	Brazil	6.06	x	6.33	6.33	
22	A	Chanice Porter	Jamaica	x	6.29	x	6.29	
23	A	Merle Homeier	Germany	6.09	x	x	6.09	
24	B	Samantha Dale	Australia	x	6.04	x	6.04	
25	A	Claire Azzopardi	Malta	5.74	5.79	5.68	5.79	
	B	Filippa Fotopoulou	Cyprus	x	x	x	NM	
	A	Milica Gardašević	Serbia	x	x	x	NM	
	B	Marthe Koala	Burkina Faso					DNS

=== Final ===
The final was started on 24 July at 17:50.

Rank	Name	Nationality	Round						Mark	Notes
Rank	Name	Nationality	1	2	3	4	5	6	Mark	Notes
1st place, gold medalist(s)	Malaika Mihambo	Germany	x	x	6.98	7.09	x	7.12	7.12	SB
2nd place, silver medalist(s)	Ese Brume	Nigeria	6.61	6.88	7.02	6.86	x	6.91	7.02	SB
3rd place, bronze medalist(s)	Leticia Oro Melo	Brazil	6.89	x	x	x	x	x	6.89	PB
4	Quanesha Burks	United States	6.46	6.88	6.50	6.46	6.48	6.45	6.88	SB
5	Brooke Buschkuehl	Australia	6.57	6.87	x	x	6.77	x	6.87	
6	Khaddi Sagnia	Sweden	x	6.69	4.56	6.66	6.87	x	6.87	
7	Ivana Vuleta	Serbia	x	6.67	x	6.84	6.84	6.75	6.84	
8	Maryna Bekh-Romanchuk	Ukraine	6.79	x	x	x	x	6.82	6.82	
9	Jazmin Sawyers	Great Britain & N.I.	6.62	6.50	6.56				6.62	
10	Lorraine Ugen	Great Britain & N.I.	x	6.53	x				6.53	
11	Ruth Usoro	Nigeria	6.50	6.52	6.31				6.52	
12	Tiffany Flynn	United States	6.48	x	x				6.48	
