= Felipe Bardi =

Brazilian sprinter (born 1998)

Personal information
- Full name: Felipe Bardi dos Santos
- Nationality: Brazilian
- Born: 8 October 1998 (age 27) Americana, São Paulo
- Height: 1.89 m (6 ft 2 in)

Sport
- Sport: Athletics
- Events: 100 metres; 200 metres
Medal record
Men's athletics
Representing Brazil
Pan American Games
Gold medal – first place	2023 Santiago	4 × 100 m
Silver medal – second place	2023 Santiago	100 m
South American Games
Silver medal – second place	2022 Asunción	100 m
South American Championships
Gold medal – first place	2017 Luque	4 × 100 m relay
Silver medal – second place	2019 Lima	100 m
Bronze medal – third place	2017 Luque	100 m

Felipe Bardi dos Santos (born 8 October 1998 in Americana) is a Brazilian track and field sprinter.

Santos focused on the 200 metres and long jump in his youth career. He placed fourth in the long jump at the 2014 Brazil U18 Championships and improved to runner-up the following year. He reached the podium of both the 100 metres and 200 m at the 2016 Brazilian U20 Championships, which earned him a place on the 4 × 100 metres relay team for Brazil at the 2016 IAAF World U20 Championships. Santos also made his debut at the Brazilian Athletics Championships that year, reaching the 100 m semi-finals.

A run of 10.27 seconds for the 100 m brought him third at the 2017 Brazilian Championships, and he repeated that, placing at the 2017 South American Championships in Athletics for a bronze medal. He also anchored the men's 4 × 100 m relay team to the gold medals, with a team of Flávio Barbosa, Aldemir da Silva Júnior, and Bruno de Barros. He competed sparingly in the 2018 season, with his highlight of the year being fifth place at the 100 m national championship race.

He won the 100 m silver medal at the 2019 South American Championships in Lima. At the 2020 Troféu Brasil de Atletismo he was runner-up to Paulo André de Oliveira in the 100 m and also helped his club, SESI São Paulo, to second place in the relay.

He improved his personal best with 10.10 (+0.8) at Cougar Athletic Stadium (Azusa Pacific University), Azusa, CA on 16 April 2021.

He competed at the 2020 Summer Olympics.

On September 9, 2023, Bardi achieved a mark of 9.96 in the 100 meters, becoming the Brazilian record holder at the time. After Issam Asinga's faster 100-meters run was rescinded due to doping, Bardi's 9.96 second run became the fastest at the 100 meters for a South American until July 31, 2025 when countryman Erik Cardoso ran a faster time of 9.93.

== Personal bests ==
- 100 m: 9.96 (wind: +1.0 m/s) – (Brazil) São Bernardo do Campo, 9 Sep 2023
- 200 m: 20.44 (wind: 0.0 m/s) – (United States) Azusa, 15 May 2021
- 60 m: 6.58 – (Bolivia) Cochabamba, 27 Jan 2024

All information from World Athletics profile.

== International competitions ==
Representing Brazil
Year	Competition	Venue	Position	Event	Result	Wind (m/s)	Notes
2016	World U20 Championships	Bydgoszcz, Poland	—	4 × 100 m relay	DQ	—N/a	
2017	South American Championships	Luque, Paraguay	3rd	100 m	10.29	+1.9	
2017	South American Championships	Luque, Paraguay	1st	4 × 100 metres relay	39.47	—N/a	
2017	Pan American U20 Championships	Trujillo, Peru	3rd	100 m	10.47	−0.4	
2017	Pan American U20 Championships	Trujillo, Peru	4th	4 × 100 m relay	39.98	—N/a	
2019	South American Championships	Lima, Peru	2nd	100 m	10.43	-0.9	
2021	World Relays	Chorzów, Poland	—	4 × 100 m relay	DQ	—N/a	
2021	South American Championships	Guayaquil, Ecuador	1st	100 m	10.10	+2.3	
2021	South American Championships	Guayaquil, Ecuador	1st	200 m	20.49	+1.9	
2021	South American Championships	Guayaquil, Ecuador	1st	4 × 100 m relay	39.10	—N/a	
2021	Olympic Games	Tokyo, Japan	38th (h)	100 m	10.26	+0.3	
2021	Olympic Games	Tokyo, Japan	12th (h)	4 × 100 m relay	38.34	—N/a	
2022	World Indoor Championships	Belgrade, Serbia	17th (sf)	60 m	6.67	—N/a	
2022	Ibero-American Championships	La Nucía, Spain	2nd	100 m	10.26	+0.1	
2022	Ibero-American Championships	La Nucía, Spain	3rd	4 × 100 m relay	39.32	—N/a	
2022	World Championships	Eugene, United States	35th (h)	100 m	10.22	-0.3	
2022	World Championships	Eugene, United States	7th	4 × 100 m relay	38.25	—N/a	
2022	South American Games	Asunción, Paraguay	2nd	100 m	10.37	-1.3	
2022	South American Games	Asunción, Paraguay	–	4 × 100 m relay	DNF	—N/a	
2023	South American Championships	São Paulo, Brazil	1st	4 × 100 m relay	38.70		
2023	World Championships	Budapest, Hungary	35th (h)	100 m	10.25	—N/a	
2023	World Championships	Budapest, Hungary	8th (h)	4 × 100 m relay	38.19^{1}	—N/a	
2023	Pan American Games	Santiago, Chile	2nd	100 m	10.31	0.0	
2023	Pan American Games	Santiago, Chile	1st	4 × 100 m relay	38.68	—N/a	
2024	South American Indoor Championships	Cochabamba, Bolivia	1st	60 m	6.58	—N/a	
2024	World Indoor Championships	Glasgow, United Kingdom	23rd (h)	60 m	6.68	—N/a	
2024	Ibero-American Championships	Cuiabá, Brazil	1st	100 m	10.14	-0.8	
2024	Ibero-American Championships	Cuiabá, Brazil	1st	4 × 100 m relay	39.19	—N/a	
2024	Olympic Games	Paris, France	32nd (h)	100 m	10.18	+0.6	
2024	Olympic Games	Paris, France	14th (h)	4 × 100 m relay	38.73	—N/a	
2025	South American Indoor Championships	Cochabamba, Bolivia	2nd	60 m	6.64	—N/a	
2025	South American Championships	Mar del Plata, Argentina	1st	100 m	9.99	+0.4	
2025	South American Championships	Mar del Plata, Argentina	2nd	4 × 100 m relay	39.62	—N/a	
2025	World Championships	Tokyo, Japan	51st (h)	100 m	10.54	−1.1	

^{1}Disqualified in the final

== See also ==
- List of international medallists in men's 100 metres
