= Troféu Brasil de Atletismo =

Annual track and field meeting

- Sport: Track and field
- Founded: 1945
- Country: Brazil

The Troféu Brasil de Atletismo (Brazil Athletics Trophy) is an annual track and field meeting which serves as Brazil's national championships for the sport for athletics clubs. The Brazilian Athletics Confederation has not explicitly designated an annual national championships, thus this also serves as the de facto senior athletics championships. It has also been used to determine the track and field team for Brazil at the Olympics.

The location and timing of the event varies, with the major cities of Rio de Janeiro and São Paulo frequently serving as host.

First held in 1945, the competition became Brazil's foremost track and field competition after the mid-1980s. The biennial Campeonato Brasileiro de Seleções Estaduais had previously been treated as the national championship event in the period from 1929 to 1985. The Troféu Brasil de Atletismo has not been held consistently since its inauguration and reached its thirtieth edition in 2011.

== Championships records ==
=== Men ===
Event	Record	Athlete/Team	Date	Place	Ref.
100 m	9.93 (+1.5 m/s) AR	Erik Cardoso	31 July 2025	São Paulo	
400 m hurdles	46.48	Alison dos Santos	26 July 2026	São Paulo	
Triple jump	13.17 (+0.4 m/s) NR	Rafael Pereira	22 June 2022	Rio de Janeiro	
Javelin throw	91.00 m AR	Luiz Maurício da Silva	3 August 2025	São Paulo	
20,000 m walk (track)	1:18:37.9 h AR	Caio Bonfim	31 July 2025	São Paulo	
Half marathon walk (track)	1:24.30.93	Caio Bonfim	23 July 2026	São Paulo	
