= Valdilene dos Santos Silva =

Brazilian long-distance runner

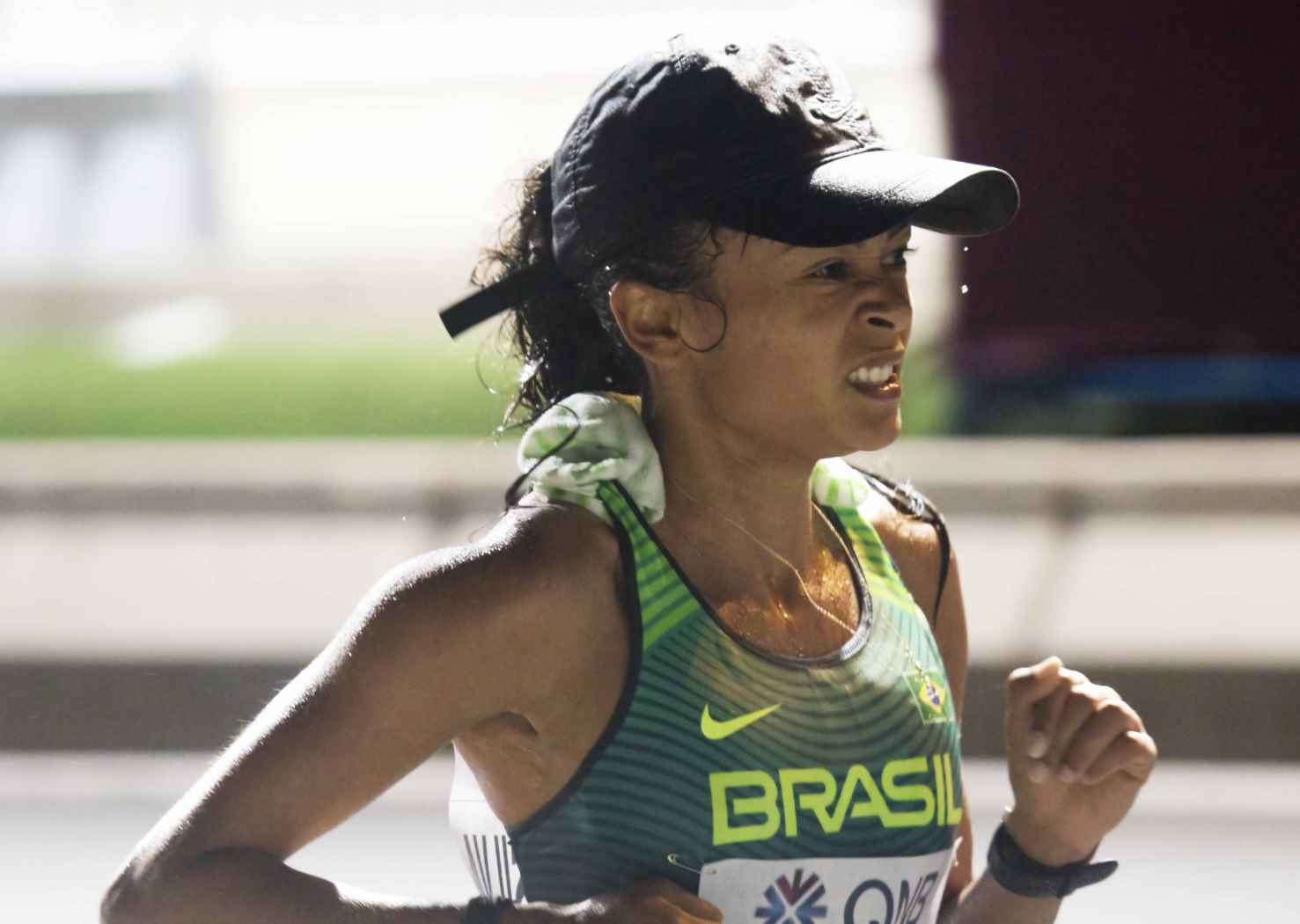

Personal information
- Born: 18 December 1991 (age 34)

Sport
- Country: Brazil
- Sport: Long-distance running

Valdilene dos Santos Silva (born 18 December 1991) is a Brazilian long-distance runner. In 2019, she competed in the women's marathon at the 2019 World Athletics Championships held in Doha, Qatar. She finished in 30th place.

In 2017, she competed in the women's half marathon at the 2017 Summer Universiade held in Taipei, Taiwan.

In 2019, she competed in the women's marathon at the 2019 Pan American Games held in Lima, Peru. She finished in 6th place. In 2020, she competed in the women's half marathon at the 2020 World Athletics Half Marathon Championships held in Gdynia, Poland.
