= Andreia Hessel =

Brazilian long-distance runner

Atleta profissional de corrida de fundo, especialista em Maratona . Representou seleção brasileira de atletismo em várias competições, inclusive Jogos Pan Americanos e Mundial de Atletismo dos anos de 2019 e 2023. Última brasileira a vencer a Maratona Internacional de SP no ano de 2018 com o tempo de 2h40'07, possui melhor marca pessoal na maratona em 2h34'55 Andreia Aparecida Hessel
Personal information
- Full name: Andreia Aparecida Hessel
- Born: 10 August 1984 (age 41)

Sport
- Country: Brazil
- Sport: Long-distance running

Andreia Aparecida Hessel (born 10 August 1984) is a Brazilian long-distance runner. In 2019, she competed in the women's marathon at the 2019 World Athletics Championships held in Doha, Qatar. She finished in 36th place.

In 2018, she won the São Paulo Marathon held in São Paulo, Brazil.

In 2019, she competed in the women's marathon at the 2019 Pan American Games held in Lima, Peru. She finished in 8th place.
