= Rafael Pereira (hurdler) =

Brazilian hurdler (born 1997)

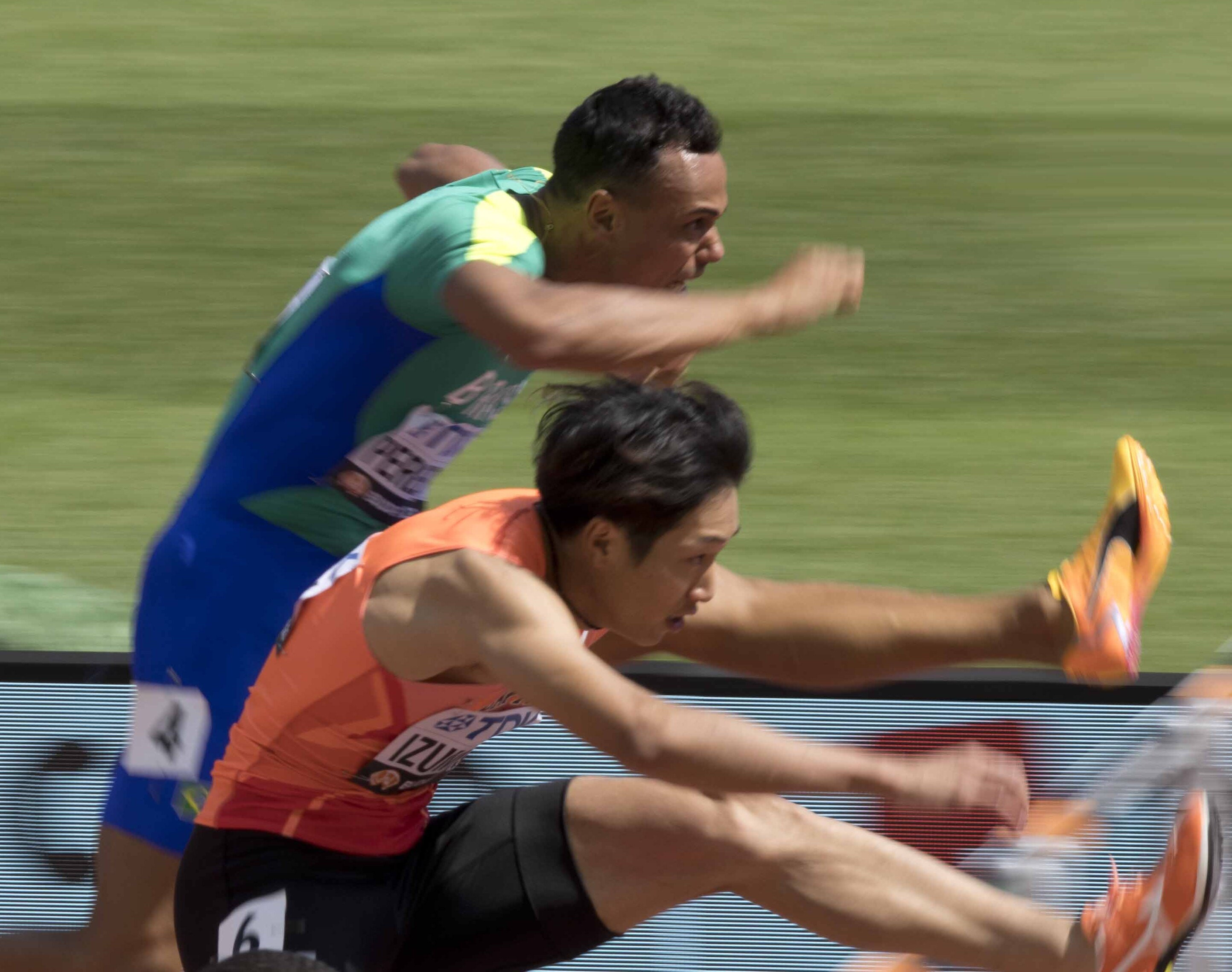
- Rafael Pereira (background) in 2023

Personal information
- Full name: Rafael Henrique Campos Pereira
- Born: 8 April 1997 (age 29) Contagem, Brazil

Sport
- Sport: Athletics
- Event: 110 metres hurdles
Medal record
Men's athletics
Representing Brazil
Pan American Games
Bronze medal – third place	2023 Santiago	110 m hurdles
South American Games
Gold medal – first place	2026 Santa Fe	110 m hurdles

Rafael Henrique Campos Pereira (born 8 April 1997) is a Brazilian specialising in the high hurdles. He won a gold medal at the 2021 South American Championships in Athletics. He competed at the 2020 Summer Olympics.

At the 2022 Brazilian championships held in Rio de Janeiro, he broke the South American record in 110 m hurdles with a time of 13.17s.

== Personal bests ==
- 110 m hurdles: 13.17 AR (wind: +0.4 m/s) – (Brazil) Rio de Janeiro, 22 June 2022
- 60 m hurdles: 7.58 – (Brazil) Berlin, 4 Feb 2022

== International competitions ==
Year	Competition	Venue	Position	Event	Notes
Representing Brazil
2014	South American Youth Championships	Cali, Colombia	3rd	Decathlon (youth)	6303 pts
2016	World U20 Championships	Bydgoszcz	18th (sf)	110 m hurdles (99 cm)	13.85
2018	South American U23 Championships	Cuenca, Ecuador	1st	110 m hurdles	13.76
2018	South American U23 Championships	Cuenca, Ecuador	2nd	4 × 400 m relay	3:09.90
2021	South American Championships	Guayaquil, Ecuador	1st	110 m hurdles	13.35
2021	Olympic Games	Tokyo, Japan	17th (sf)	110 m hurdles	13.62
2022	South American Indoor Championships	Cochabamba, Bolivia	1st	60 m hurdles	7.58
2022	World Indoor Championships	Belgrade, Serbia	11th (sf)	60 m hurdles	7.58
2022	Ibero-American Championships	La Nucía, Spain	1st	110 m hurdles	13.47
2022	World Championships	Eugene, United States	17th (sf)	110 m hurdles	13.46
2023	World Championships	Budapest, Hungary	19th (sf)	110 m hurdles	13.52
2023	Pan American Games	Santiago, Chile	3rd	110 m hurdles	14.04
2024	World Indoor Championships	Glasgow, United Kingdom	40th (h)	60 m hurdles	8.65
2024	Ibero-American Championships	Cuiabá, Brazil	2nd	110 m hurdles	13.35 (w)
2024	Olympic Games	Paris, France	24th (sf)	110 m hurdles	13.87
2025	World Indoor Championships	Nanjing, China	11th (sf)	60 m hurdles	7.67
2026	South American Indoor Championships	Cochabamba, Bolivia	2nd	60 m hurdles	7.62
2026	Ibero-American Championships	Lima, Peru	2nd	110 m hurdles	13.57
2026	Pan American Championships	Medellín, Colombia	2nd	110 m hurdles	13.42
2026	South American Games	Santa Fe, Argentina	1st	110 m hurdles	13.52
