= Elianay Pereira =

Brazilian racewalker

Personal information
- Born: 11 May 1984 (age 42)

Sport
- Country: Brazil
- Sport: Race walking
Medal record
Representing Brazil
Women's athletics
World Team Championships
Bronze medal – third place	2026 Brasília	Marathon walk (team)

Elianay Pereira (born 11 May 1984) is a Brazilian racewalker. She competed in the women's 50 kilometres walk at the 2019 World Athletics Championships held in Doha, Qatar. She finished in 16th place. She also competed in the women's 35 kilometres walk at the 2022 World Athletics Championships held in Eugene, Oregon, United States.

== Personal bests ==
As of July 2022, her best times are:

=== Road walk ===
- 35 km: 3:05:39 – (United States) Eugene, 22 Jul 2022
- 50 km: 4:29:33 – (Peru) Lima, 11 Aug 2019
