= Leticia Oro Melo =

Brazilian athlete (born 1997)

Letícia Melo
Personal information
- Born: Letícia Oro Melo; 5 October 1997 (age 29) Joinville, Brazil
- Height: 1.58 m (5 ft 2 in)

Sport
- Sport: Track and field
- Event: Long jump
Medal record
Women's athletics
Representing Brazil
World Championships
Bronze medal – third place	2022 Eugene	Long jump
South American Games
Bronze medal – third place	2026 Santa Fe	Long jump

Letícia Oro Melo (born 5 October 1997 in Joinville) is a Brazilian athlete who competes in track and field. Melo won the bronze medal in the long jump at the 2022 World Athletics Championships. Prior to this, Melo won the 2021 South American Championships in long jump and the title at the Brazilian national championships in 2022.

== Career ==
In 2012, after competing primarily in sprint events on the track, such as 100 m and 200 m, she entered the list of jumpers at the Santa Catarina state championships, where she eventually won the competition and set a new championship record of 5.59 metres.

She was South American under-18 champion in 2014 and under-20 champion in 2015.

Melo won the long jump at the 2021 South American Championships in Athletics with a new personal best jump of 6.63 metres.

She had a serious knee injury, suffered in December 2021, when she tore her cruciate ligament and was out of competition for seven months. On 27 June 2022, her return were the Brazil national championships, where she was champion of the tournament, and was selected for the 2022 World Athletics Championships.

At the World Athletics Championships in July 2022 in Eugene, Oregon, she made it to the final with her last jump of the qualifying trials, with 6.64 metres it was also a new personal best. Melo had faulted on her two previous jumps, and the jump pipped the American Jasmine Moore by 3 centimetres. In the final, she won the bronze medal with a jump of 6.89 metres, just one centimetre further than the fourth placed Burks from the United States. Melo set the mark with her first attempt and attempted 7 metres in the following ones, burning all the remaining attempts and approaching 7 metres in a few of those invalid jumps. Nonetheless, she surpassed the best jump of her career by 25 centimetres to obtain the bronze. It was the first medal of a Brazilian in the history of this event at World Championships.

She qualified seventh at the 2023 World Athletics Championships long jump in Budapest and finished twelve in the final.

== Personal bests ==
- Long Jump: 6.89 (wind: +1.1 m/s) – (United States) Eugene, 24 July 2022

All information from World Athletics profile.
