= Viviane Lyra =

Brazilian racewalker (born 1993)

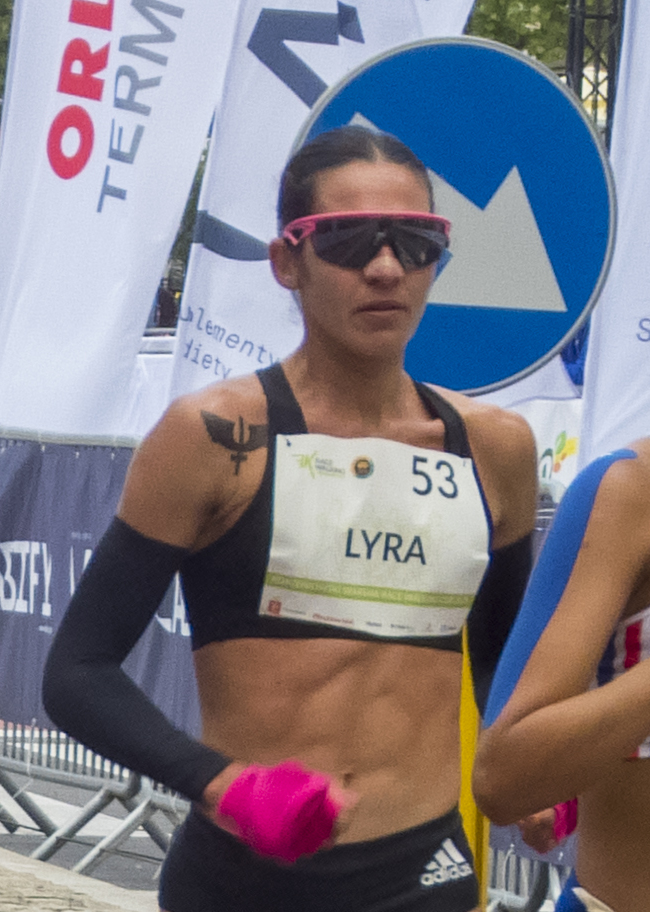
- Lyra in 2025

Personal information
- Full name: Viviane Santana Lyra
- Born: 29 July 1993 (age 32) Rio de Janeiro

Sport
- Country: Brazil
- Event: Race walking
Medal record
Representing Brazil
Women's athletics
World Team Championships
Bronze medal – third place	2026 Brasília	Marathon walk (team)
Pan American Games
Bronze medal – third place	2023 Santiago	Marathon walk relay
Pan American Cup
Gold medal – first place	2023 Managua	35 km walk
Bronze medal – third place	2021 Guayaquil	20 km walk
South American Games
Gold medal – first place	2022 Asunción	35 km walk
Silver medal – second place	2022 Asunción	20 km walk
South American Championships
Gold medal – first place	2025 Mar del Plata	20 km walk
South American Race Walking Championships
Gold medal – first place	2020 Lima	50 km walk
Gold medal – first place	2024 Recife	35 km walk

Viviane Santana Lyra (born 29 July 1993 in Rio de Janeiro) is a Brazilian racewalker. She competed in the women's 20 kilometres walk event at the 2019 World Athletics Championships held in Doha, Qatar. She did not finish her race. She also competed in the same event at the 2022 World Athletics Championships held in Eugene, Oregon, United States.

In 2019, she competed in the women's 50 kilometres walk event at the Pan American Games held in Lima, Peru. She finished in 4th place with a personal best of 4:22:46.

In 2022, she broke the Brazilian record of 35 km twice, once in April, with a time of 2:49:12, and another at the 2022 World Athletics Championships, with the mark of 2:45:02, where she finished in 8th place.

At the 2023 Pan American Race Walking Cup held in Managua, she won a gold medal in the 20 km walk.

Lyra had hepatitis in June 2023, diagnosed during the La Coruña GP and had to stop training for 2 weeks. Despite this, at the 2023 World Athletics Championships, held in August in Budapest, she finished 4th in the 35 km walk race, breaking the Brazilian record, with a time of 2:44.40.

At the 2023 Pan American Games, in the debut of the Race walk mixed team, Lyra and Caio Bonfim obtained the bronze medal.

== Personal bests ==
Her best times are:

=== Road walk ===
- 20 km: 1:27:13 – (Spain) La Coruna, 18 May 2024
- 35 km: 2:44:40 – (Hungary) Budapest, 24 Aug 2023 (Brazilian record)
- 50 km: 4:22:46 – (Peru) Lima, 11 Aug 2019 (Brazilian record)
