= Paulo Roberto Paula =

Brazilian long-distance runner

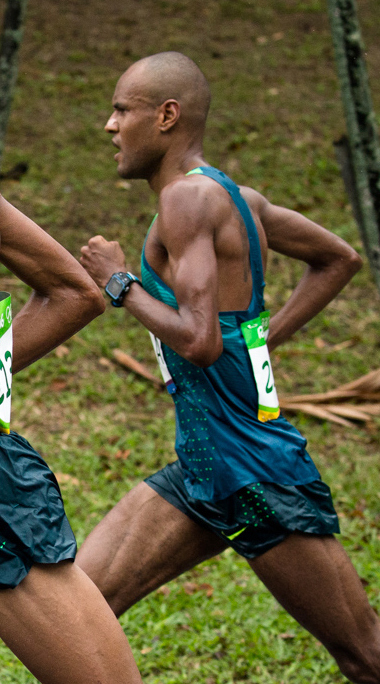
- Paula at the 2016 Olympics

Personal information
- Born: 8 July 1979 (age 47) Pacaembu, Brazil
- Height: 170 cm (5 ft 7 in)
- Weight: 55 kg (121 lb)

Sport
- Country: Brazil
- Sport: Athletics
- Event: 5000 m – marathon
- Club: Cruzeiro Sport Club; Luasa Sports Taubaté; São Paulo FC
- Coached by: Dino de Aguiar Cintra Filho; Marco Antonio de Oliveira

Achievements and titles
- Personal bests: 5000 m – 14:00.81 (2010); 10 km – 28:34 (2014); HM – 1:02:30 (2011); Marathon – 2:09:51 (2022)

Paulo Roberto de Almeida Paula (born 8 July 1979) is a Brazilian long-distance runner who competed in marathon races. He finished 8th in the marathon at the 2012 London Olympics, 15th at the 2016 Rio Olympics and 68th at the 2020 Tokyo Olympics. He is a member of the Cruzeiro Sport Club.

He began competing nationally in his teenage years. He was runner-up over 10,000 metres at the 1998 Brazilian Junior Championships with a run of 30:42.94 minutes. He began to progress in the senior ranks of the event in 2002, finishing fourth at the Brazilian Athletics Championships with a run of 28:58.03 minutes. However, he did not frequently compete at the top level over the following years.

He moved up to the half marathon distance, and in 2007 he was runner-up at the São Paulo Half Marathon with a time of 64:29 minutes. He repeated that feat in 2008 and 2009 and improved his best time to 64:26 minutes over the period. His marathon debut followed in 2011 with a run at the Amsterdam Marathon, where his finishing time of 2:13:15 hours was enough for 17th place. Two better performances in 2012 (2:11:51 at the Barcelona Marathon, then 2:10:23 for third at the Maratona di Sant'Antonio) saw him chosen for the Brazilian team for the 2012 London Olympics.

At the start of 2013, he dropped out of the Lake Biwa Marathon, but he showed a resurgence of form by winning the Maratona di Sant'Antonio in Italy – his first international victory.

In 2019, he competed in the men's marathon at the 2019 World Athletics Championships held in Doha, Qatar. He finished in 19th place.

He competed at the 2020 Summer Olympics.

Paula serves in the Brazilian Army. His twin brother Luiz Fernando is also an international long-distance runner. He tried to qualify in the marathon for the 2012 Olympics.
