= Tiffani Marinho =

Brazilian sprinter (born 1999)

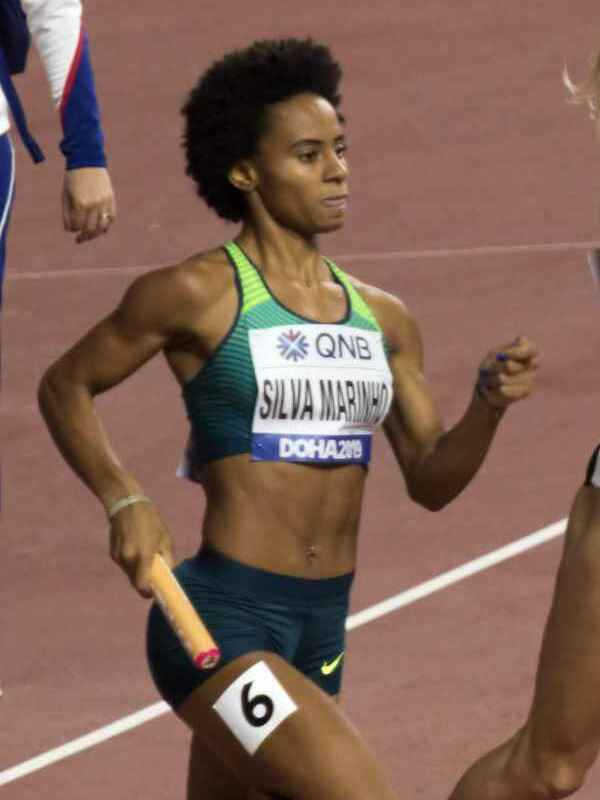
- Marinho in 2019

Personal information
- Full name: Tiffani Beatriz Domingos Silva do Nascimento Marinho
- Born: 6 May 1999 (age 27) Duque de Caxias, Rio de Janeiro, Brazil
- Height: 1.67 m (5 ft 6 in)

Sport
- Sport: Athletics
- Event: Sprinting
Medal record
Women's athletics
Representing Brazil
World Relays
| Silver medal – second place | 2021 Chorzów | 4×400 m relay mixed |
Pan American Games
| Silver medal – second place | 2023 Santiago | 4×400 m relay mixed |
| Bronze medal – third place | 2023 Santiago | 4×400 m relay |
Junior Pan American Games
| Gold medal – first place | 2021 Cali-Valle | 4×400 m relay mixed |
| Bronze medal – third place | 2021 Cali-Valle | 400 m |

Tiffani Beatriz Domingos Silva do Nascimento Marinho (born 6 May 1999) is a Brazilian athlete. She competed in the mixed 4 × 400 metres relay event at the 2019 World Athletics Championships. She competed at the 2020 Summer Olympics.

Silva Marinho won the gold medal in 4×400 m relay mixed relays and bronze in 400 m during the 2021 Junior Pan American Games held in Cali, Colombia.

== Personal bests ==
- 400 m: 51.51 s – Rio de Janeiro, Brazil, 23 Jun 2022

All information from World Athletics profile.
