= Érica de Sena =

Brazilian race walker

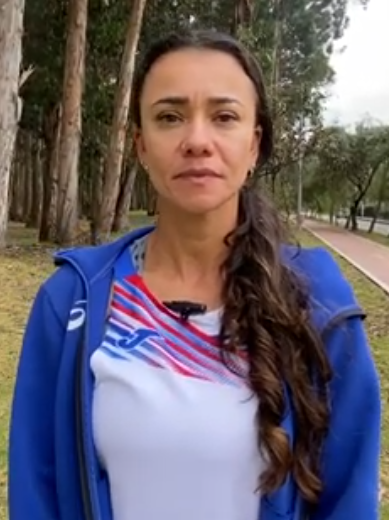
- In a 2023 interview

Personal information
- Full name: Érica Rocha de Sena
- Born: 3 May 1985 (age 41) Camaragibe, Pernambuco

Sport
- Country: Brazil
- Sport: Athletics
Medal record
Representing Brazil
Women's athletics
World Team Championships
Bronze medal – third place	2016 Rome	20 km walk
Bronze medal – third place	2024 Antalya	20 km walk
Pan American Games
Silver medal – second place	2015 Toronto	20 km walk
Bronze medal – third place	2019 Lima	20 km walk
- Updated on 19 April 2025

Érica Rocha de Sena (born 3 May 1985) is a female racewalker from Brazil. In the 20 km walk, she took 4th place at the 2017 World Championships, and 7th place at the 2016 Summer Olympics. She is the only Brazilian to win a medal at the IAAF World Race Walking Team Championships, after inheriting the 20 km race bronze in the 2016 race, held in Rome.

== Career ==
In the same event, Sena also has the country's best racewalking performance by a woman at the Olympic Games, with a seventh place in the 2016 Rio de Janeiro games, and the World Championships in Athletics, a fourth place in both 2017 and 2019.

She competed at the 2020 Summer Olympics, where Sena was third with just 400 meters to go before she got her third caution and was removed from the course for two minutes, making her lose a medal and finish 11th. Afterwards she had a son with husband and coach Andres Chocho, and only returned to competition in 2023, and in just four competitions qualified for the 2023 World Athletics Championships and the 2024 Summer Olympics.

== Personal life ==
She is married to an Ecuadorian race walker, Andrés Chocho.

== Personal bests ==
=== Road walk ===
- 10 km: 43:03 min – (China) Suzhou, 25 Sep 2017
- 20 km: 1:26:59 hrs – (United Kingdom) London, 13 Aug 2017

=== Track walk ===
- 5000 m: 23:10.59 min – (Brazil) Campinas, 7 Nov 2011
- 10,000 m: 43:41.30 min – (Brazil) São Paulo, 1 Aug 2014
- 20,000 m: 1:32:06.0 h – (Brazil) Paulista, 27 Jun 2024
