= Vitória Cristina Rosa =

Brazilian sprinter (born 1996)

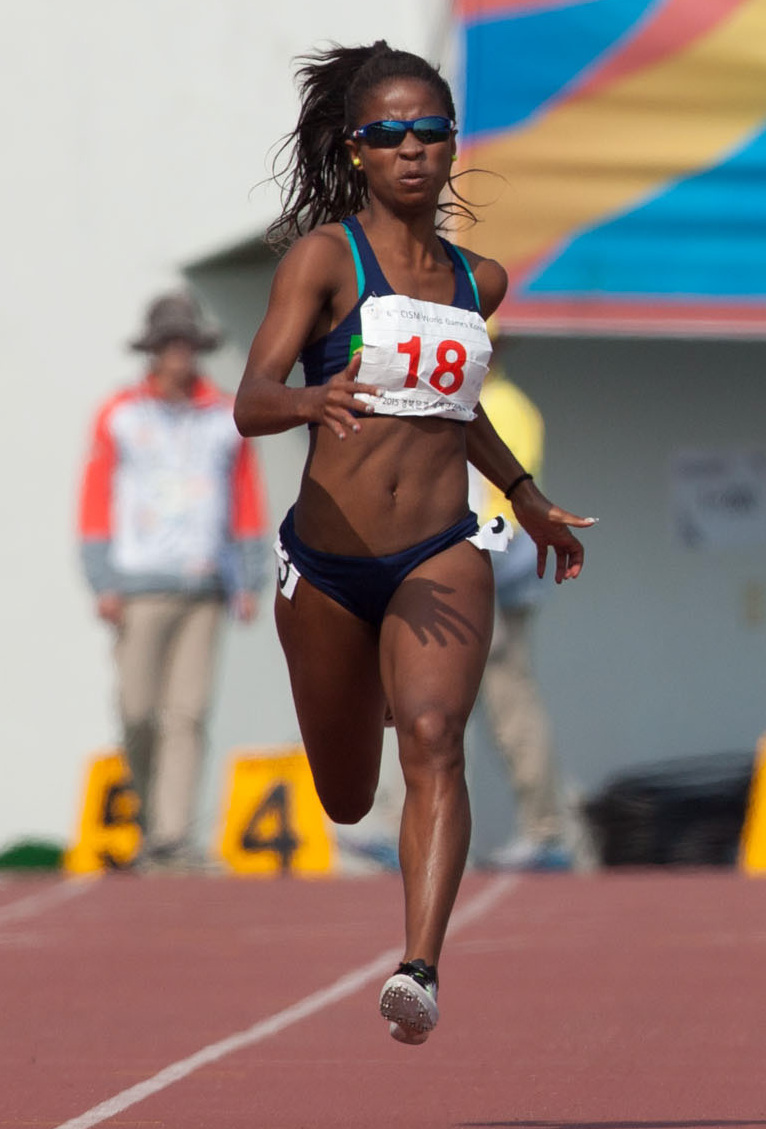
- Vitória Cristina Rosa at the 2015 Military World Games

Personal information
- Born: 12 January 1996 (age 30) Rio de Janeiro, Brazil
- Height: 1.70 m (5 ft 7 in)
- Weight: 48 kg (106 lb)

Sport
- Sport: Athletics
- Event: 200 metres
Medal record
Women's athletics
Representing Americas
Continental Cup
Gold medal – first place	2018 Ostrava	4 × 100 m
Representing Brazil
Pan American Games
Gold medal – first place	2019 Lima	4 × 100 m relay
Silver medal – second place	2019 Lima	200 m
Bronze medal – third place	2019 Lima	100 m

Vitória Cristina Silva Rosa (born 12 January 1996) is a Brazilian sprinter. South American record holder for the 200 m (outdoor) and 60 m (indoor).

She competed in the 200 metres at the 2015 World Championships in Athletics in Beijing without advancing from the first round. In June 2021, she qualified to represent Brazil at the 2020 Summer Olympics.

On 18 March 2022, in the 2022 World Athletics Indoor Championships semifinals she broke the South American record in the Women's 60 metres with a time of 7.14. She finished 8th in the final, the best result in Brazil's history in this competition at the World Athletics Indoor Championships.

On 19 July 2022, in the 2022 World Athletics Championships semifinals. she broke the South American record in the Women's 200 metres with a time of 22.47. She finished 12th in the semifinals, almost equaling the best Brazilian position in the race's history (11th place).

== Personal bests ==
- 100 m: 11.03 s (wind: +0.3 m/s) – Guadalajara, Spain, 6 Jul 2018
- 200 m: 22.47 s (wind: +1.4 m/s) – Eugene, USA, 19 Jul 2022
- 4 × 100 m: 42.11 s – Ostrava, Czech Republic, 8 Sep 2018

Indoor

- 60 m: 7.14 s – Belgrade, Serbia, 18 Mar 2022

== International competitions ==
Year	Competition	Venue	Position	Event	Notes
Representing Brazil
2013	World Youth Championships	Donetsk, Ukraine	15th (sf)	100 m	11.98
2013	World Youth Championships	Donetsk, Ukraine	8th (h)	Medley relay	2:11.20
2014	World Junior Championships	Eugene, United States	11th (sf)	100 m	11.75
2014	World Junior Championships	Eugene, United States	15th (sf)	200 m	24.01
2014	World Junior Championships	Eugene, United States	3rd (h)	4 × 100 m relay	44.61^{1}
2014	South American U23 Championships	Montevideo, Uruguay	3rd	100 m	11.64
2014	South American U23 Championships	Montevideo, Uruguay	1st	4 × 100 m relay	45.44
2015	South American Junior Championships	Cuenca, Ecuador	2nd (h)	100 m	11.36^{2}
2015	South American Junior Championships	Cuenca, Ecuador	2nd	200 m	23.48
2015	South American Junior Championships	Cuenca, Ecuador	1st	4 × 100 m relay	44.67
2015	South American Championships	Lima, Peru	4th	100 m	11.66
2015	South American Championships	Lima, Peru	2nd	4 × 100 m relay	44.43
2015	Pan American Junior Championships	Edmonton, Canada	5th	100 m	11.58
2015	Pan American Junior Championships	Edmonton, Canada	2nd	200 m	23.42
2015	Pan American Games	Toronto, Canada	14th (sf)	200 m	23.14 (w)
2015	Pan American Games	Toronto, Canada	4th	4 × 100 m relay	43.01
2015	World Championships	Beijing, China	37th (h)	200 m	23.32
2015	World Championships	Beijing, China	9th (h)	4 × 100 m relay	43.15
2016	Ibero-American Championships	Rio de Janeiro, Brazil	11th (h)	200 m	23.95
2016	Olympic Games	Rio de Janeiro, Brazil	47th (h)	200 m	23.35
2016	South American U23 Championships	Lima, Peru	1st	200 m	23.95
2016	South American U23 Championships	Lima, Peru	2nd	4 × 100 m relay	45.74
2017	World Relays	Nassau, Bahamas	8th (h)	4 × 100 m relay	44.20^{1}
2017	South American Championships	Asunción, Paraguay	1st	200 m	22.67 (w)
2017	South American Championships	Asunción, Paraguay	1st	4 × 100 m relay	43.12
2017	World Championships	London, United Kingdom	19th (sf)	200 m	23.31
2017	World Championships	London, United Kingdom	7th	4 × 100 m relay	42.63
2018	World Indoor Championships	Birmingham, United Kingdom	34th (h)	60 m	7.39
2018	South American Games	Cochabamba, Bolivia	3rd	100 m	11.23
2018	South American Games	Cochabamba, Bolivia	1st	200 m	22.87
2018	Ibero-American Championships	Trujillo, Peru	1st	100 m	11.33
2018	Ibero-American Championships	Trujillo, Peru	1st	200 m	22.90
2018	South American U23 Championships	Cuenca, Ecuador	2nd	100 m	11.17
2018	South American U23 Championships	Cuenca, Ecuador	1st	200 m	23.04
2019	World Relays	Yokohama, Japan	4th	4 × 100 m relay	43.75
2019	South American Championships	Lima, Peru	1st	100 m	11.24
2019	South American Championships	Lima, Peru	1st	200 m	22.90
2019	Universiade	Naples, Italy	5th	100 m	11.41
2019	Pan American Games	Lima, Peru	3rd	100 m	11.30
2019	Pan American Games	Lima, Peru	2nd	200 m	22.62
2019	Pan American Games	Lima, Peru	1st	4 × 100 m relay	43.04
2019	World Championships	Doha, Qatar	33rd (h)	100 m	11.41
2019	World Championships	Doha, Qatar	41st (h)	200 m	23.81
2019	World Championships	Doha, Qatar	–	4 × 100 m relay	DQ
2021	World Relays	Chorzów, Poland	–	4 × 100 m relay	DQ
2021	South American Championships	Guayaquil, Ecuador	1st	100 m	11.31
2021	South American Championships	Guayaquil, Ecuador	1st	200 m	23.10
2021	Olympic Games	Tokyo, Japan	34th (h)	200 m	23.59
2021	Olympic Games	Tokyo, Japan	11th (h)	4 × 100 m relay	43.15
2022	World Indoor Championships	Belgrade, Serbia	8th	60 m	7.21
2022	Ibero-American Championships	La Nucía, Spain	1st	100 m	11.22
2022	Ibero-American Championships	La Nucía, Spain	1st	200 m	23.53
2022	World Championships	Eugene, United States	23rd (h)	100 m	11.20
2022	World Championships	Eugene, United States	12th (sf)	200 m	22.47
2022	South American Games	Asunción, Paraguay	9th (h)	100 m	12.26
2023	South American Championships	São Paulo, Brazil	1st	100 m	11.17
2023	South American Championships	São Paulo, Brazil	1st	4 × 100 m relay	43.47
2023	World Championships	Budapest, Hungary	42nd (h)	100 m	11.57
2023	World Championships	Budapest, Hungary	44th (h)	200 m	23.86
2023	World Championships	Budapest, Hungary	15th (h)	4 × 100 m relay	43.46
2024	World Indoor Championships	Glasgow, United Kingdom	33rd (h)	60 m	7.32
2024	Ibero-American Championships	Cuiabá, Brazil	2nd	100 m	11.23
2024	Ibero-American Championships	Cuiabá, Brazil	1st	4 × 100 m relay	43.54
2024	Olympic Games	Paris, France	68th (h)	100 m	12.02
2025	South American Championships	Mar del Plata, Argentina	1st	100 m	11.21
2025	South American Championships	Mar del Plata, Argentina	2nd	200 m	23.25 (w)
2026	South American Games	Santa Fe, Argentina	3rd	4 × 100 m relay	44.79

^{1}Did not finish in the final

^{2}Out of competition performance
