= Brazilian Athletics Confederation =

Athletic governing body

- Confederação Brasileira de Atletismo
- Sport: Athletics
- Jurisdiction: Confederation
- Abbreviation: CBAt
- Founded: December 2, 1977
- Affiliation: World Athletics
- Regional affiliation: CONSUDATLE
- Affiliation date: 1922
- Headquarters: São Paulo, São Paulo
- President: José Antonio Martins Fernandes
- Vice president: Warlindo Carneiro da Silva Filho
- Secretary: Martinho Nobre dos Santos
- Sponsor: Caixa Econômica Federal
- Replaced: Federação Brasileira de Sportes Atleticos
- (founded): 1914

Official website
- www.cbat.org.br
- (Brazil)

The Brazilian Athletics Confederation (CBAt; Brazilian Portuguese: Confederação Brasileira de Atletismo) is the governing body for the sport of athletics in Brazil. President for the period 2013-2016 is José Antonio Martins Fernandes.

== History ==
CBAt was founded on December 2, 1977. It replaced the Federação Brasileira de Sportes Atleticos, which was founded in 1914.

Former president until 2013 was Roberto Gesta de Melo.

== Affiliations ==
CBAt is the national member federation for Brazil in the following international organisations:

- World Athletics
- Confederación Sudamericana de Atletismo (CONSUDATLE; South American Athletics Confederation)
- Association of Panamerican Athletics (APA)
- Asociación Iberoamericana de Atletismo (AIA; Ibero-American Athletics Association)

Moreover, it is part of the following national organisations:

- Brazilian Olympic Committee

== Member federations ==

CBAt comprises the athletics federations of the Brazilian federal states.

State	Organisation	Link
Acre	Federação Acreana de Atletismo - FAcA	
Alagoas	Federação Alagoana de Atletismo - FAAt	
Amapá	Federação de Atletismo do Amapá - FAAp	
Amazonas	Federação Desportiva de Atletismo do Estado do Amazonas - FEDAEAM	
Bahia	Federação Bahiana de Atletismo - FBA	www.fba.org.br
Ceará	Federação Cearense de Atletismo - FCAt	www.fcatletismo.com.br
Distrito Federal	Federação de Atletismo do Distrito Federal - FAtDF	www.fatdf.org.br
Espírito Santo	Federação Capixaba de Atletismo - FECAt	
Goiás	Federação Goiana de Atletismo - FGAt	atletismodegoias.com
Maranhão	Federação Atlética Maranhense - FAMA	
Mato Grosso	Federação de Atletismo de Mato Grosso - FAMT	www.famt.com.br
Mato Grosso do Sul	Federação de Atletismo de Mato Grosso do Sul - FAMS	
Minas Gerais	Federação Mineira de Atletismo - FMA	
Pará	Federação Paraense de Atletismo - FPAt	www.fpat.com.br
Paraíba	Federação Paraibana de Atletismo - FPbA	
Paraná	Federação de Atletismo do Paraná - FAP	www.atletismofap.org.br
Pernambuco	Federação Pernambucana de Atletismo - FEPA	www.atletismopernambucano.com.br
Piauí	Federação de Atletismo do Piauí - FAPI	
Rio de Janeiro	Federação de Atletismo do Estado do Rio de Janeiro - FARJ	www.atletismorio.com.br
Rio Grande do Norte	Federação Norte-Rio-Grandense de Atletismo - FNA	www.fnatletismo.com.br
Rio Grande do Sul	Federação de Atletismo do Estado do Rio Grande do Sul - FAERGS	www.faergs.org.br
Rondônia	Federação de Atletismo de Rondônia - FARO	
Roraima	Federação Roraimense de Atletismo - FERA	
Santa Catarina	Federação Catarinense de Atletismo - FCA	www.fcatletismo.org.br
São Paulo	Federação Paulista de Atletismo - FPA	www.atletismofpa.org.br
Sergipe	Federação Sergipana de Atletismo - FSAt	
Tocantins	Federação de Atletismo do Estado do Tocantins - FATO	

== Kit suppliers ==
Brazil's kits are currently supplied by Nike.

== National records ==
CBAt maintains the Brazilian records in athletics
