= 2014 Paraguayan Athletics Championships =

- Dates: October 24–25
- Host city: Asunción, Paraguay
- Venue: Secretaria Nacional de Deportes
- Level: Open
- Type: Outdoor

The 2014 Campeonato de la Victoria or 2014 Torneo de la Victoria was held at the Secretaria Nacional de Deportes in Asunción, organized by Federación Paraguaya de Atletismo. It was the 64th edition.

The competition serves as the Paraguayan Athletics Championships in track and field for the Republic of Paraguay, being the country's most important national athletics competitions.

The 2014 editions saw the last participation of 2004, 2008 and 2012 Summer Olympics Paraguayan representative Leryn Franco.

The championship finished being successful for the athletes of the Paraguay Marathon Club, amongst other clubs, with various athletes achievement first place in their respective disciplines.

ABC Color referenced Paola Miranda and Víctor Fatecha as the best athletes of the championships.

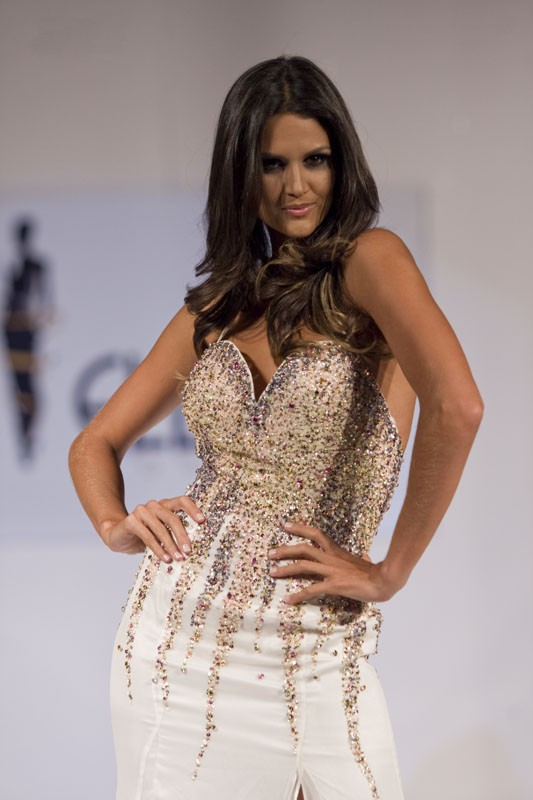
The 2014 Championship was Leryn Franco's last participation as an athlete

== Results ==
- Results of the competition were published on the official website of the Federación Paraguaya de Atletismo.

=== Men's ===
==== 100m ====
===== Series 1 =====
| Rank | Name | Department | Result | Notes |
|---|---|---|---|---|
| 1st place, gold medalist(s) | Fredy Abel Maidana Pedrozo | Misiones | 10.72 | |
| 2nd place, silver medalist(s) | Angel Domingo Ayala Galeano | Central | 10.87 | |
| 3rd place, bronze medalist(s) | John William Zavala Zalimben | Central | 10.98 | |
| 4 | Roger Steven Sosa Ortiz | Central | 11.32 | |
| 5 | Julio Cesar Gonzalez Ayala | Central | 11.38 | |
| 6 | Jesus Manuel Caceres Lopez | Central | 11.41 | |
| 7 | Christhopher Josue Ortiz Gonzalez | Caaguazú | 11.56 | |
| 8 | Miguel Rojas | Central | 11.80 | |

===== Series 2 =====
| Rank | Name | Department | Result | Notes |
|---|---|---|---|---|
| 1st place, gold medalist(s) | Reinaldo Fabian Ruiz Bareiro | Central | 11.55 | |
| 2nd place, silver medalist(s) | Oscar Gill Ocampos | Central | 11.73 | |
| 3rd place, bronze medalist(s) | Jose Carlos Caceres Lopez | Itapúa | 12.04 | |
| 4 | Elias Gaspar Mereles Otazu | Central | 12.16 | |
| 5 | Braian Martin Elizaur Estigarribia | Guairá | 12.29 | |
| 6 | Isidro Ismael Roman Rivarola | Central | 12.29 | |
| 7 | Alexis David Aguirre Figueredo | Guairá | 12.94 | |

===== Series 3 =====
| Rank | Name | Department | Result | Notes |
|---|---|---|---|---|
| 1st place, gold medalist(s) | Miguel Rojas | Central | 11.55 | |
| 2nd place, silver medalist(s) | Alexis David Aguirre Figueredo | Guairá | 11.73 | |
| 3rd place, bronze medalist(s) | Braian Martin Elizaur Estigarribia | Guairá | 12.04 | |

==== 200m ====
===== Series 1 =====
| Rank | Name | Department | Result | Notes |
|---|---|---|---|---|
| 1st place, gold medalist(s) | John William Zavala Zalimben | Central | 21.76 | |
| 2nd place, silver medalist(s) | Angel Domingo Ayala Galeano | Central | 21.80 | |
| 3rd place, bronze medalist(s) | Jesus Manuel Caceres Lopez | Central | 22.56 | |
| 4 | Roger Steven Sosa Ortiz | Central | 22.68 | |
| 5 | Miguel Angel Cabrera Fernandez | Central | 23.14 | |
| 6 | Cristian David Leguizamon Riquelme | Central | 49.19 | |

===== Series 2 =====
| Rank | Name | Department | Result | Notes |
|---|---|---|---|---|
| 1st place, gold medalist(s) | Renato Rodriguez Rivas | Central | 23.77 | |
| 2nd place, silver medalist(s) | Lucas Daniel Britez Franco | Central | 24.51 | |
| 3rd place, bronze medalist(s) | Jose Daniel Vazquez Lesme | Guairá | 24.92 | |
| 4 | Pablo Beltramino | Central | 25.68 | |

==== 400m ====
| Rank | Name | Department | Result | Notes |
|---|---|---|---|---|
| 1st place, gold medalist(s) | Miguel Angel Cabrera Fernandez | Central | 49.54 | |
| 2nd place, silver medalist(s) | Ramon Silva Azuaga | Central | 49.82 | |
| 3rd place, bronze medalist(s) | Fredy Abel Maidana Pedrozo | Misiones | 50.11 | |
| 4 | Giovanni Osmar Villalba Caceres | Central | 51.41 | |
| 5 | Miguel Rojas | Central | 51.89 | |
| 6 | Diego Daniel Sosa Caceres | Itapúa | 52.67 | |
| 7 | Jorge Gustavo Villalba Caballero | Central | 52.93 | |
| 8 | Lucas Daniel Britez Franco | Central | 53.86 | |
| 9 | Roberto Brusqueti | Central | 55.36 | |
| 10 | Jorge Luis Villar Rivas | Central | 55.46 | |
| 11 | Martin David Ledesma Arevalos | Central | 55.84 | |
| 12 | Jose Daniel Vazquez Lesme | Guairá | 56.03 | |
| 13 | Ivan Federico Santos Gamarra | Central | 64.76 | |

==== High jump ====
| Rank | Athlete | Department | 1 | 2 | 3 | 4 | 5 | 6 | Result | Notes |
|---|---|---|---|---|---|---|---|---|---|---|
| 1st place, gold medalist(s) | Christopher Josue Ortiz Gonzalez | Caaguazú | | | | | | | 1.66 | |
| 2nd place, silver medalist(s) | Mauricio Daniel Pereira Cardozo | Central | | | | | | | 1.63 | |
| 3rd place, bronze medalist(s) | Humberto Gregori Sarubbi Orue | Central | | | | | | | 1.60 | |
| 4 | Fredy Abel Maidana Pedrozo | Misiones | | | | | | | 1.60 | |
| 5 | Diego Daniel Sosa Caceres | Itapúa | | | | | | | 1.60 | |
| 6 | Adalberto David Gonzalez Ibarrola | Central | | | | | | | 1.55 | |
| 7 | Hector Damian Arrua Cabral | Central | | | | | | | 1.55 | |
| 8 | Walter Fabian Ferreira Maciel | Paraguarí | | | | | | | 1.50 | |
| 9 | Jesus Manuel Caceres Lopez | Central | | | | | | | 1.40 | |

==== Long jump ====
| Rank | Athlete | Department | 1 | 2 | 3 | 4 | 5 | 6 | Result | Notes |
|---|---|---|---|---|---|---|---|---|---|---|
| 1st place, gold medalist(s) | Diego Daniel Sosa Caceres | Itapúa | | | | | | | 6.45 (+0.6) | |
| 2nd place, silver medalist(s) | Fredy Abel Maidana Pedrozo | Misiones | | | | | | | 6.29 (-0.1) | |
| 3rd place, bronze medalist(s) | Reinaldo Fabian Ruiz Bareiro | Paraguarí | | | | | | | 6.15 (+1.3) | |
| 4 | Christhopher Josue Ortiz Gonzalez | Caaguazú | | | | | | | 6.15 (+0.9) | |
| 5 | Jose Gabriel Ramirez | Central | | | | | | | (6.09 +0.5) | |
| 6 | Walter Fabian Ferreira Maciel | Paraguarí | | | | | | | (5.93 +1.2) | |
| 7 | Diego Gabriel Molinas | N/A | | | | | | | 5.85 (+1.5) | |
| 8 | Jose Luis Duarte Aquino | Central | | | | | | | 5.66 (+0.0) | |
| 9 | Pablo Beltramino | Central | | | | | | | 5.54 (+1.4) | |
| 10 | Benjamin Arrua Escalante | Central | | | | | | | 5.03 (+2.0) | |
| 11 | Adalberto David Gonzalez Ibarrola | Central | | | | | | | 4.92 (+0.7) | |

==== Triple jump ====
| Rank | Athlete | Department | 1 | 2 | 3 | 4 | 5 | 6 | Result | Notes |
|---|---|---|---|---|---|---|---|---|---|---|
| 1st place, gold medalist(s) | Christhopher Josue Ortiz Gonzalez | Caaguazú | | | | | | | 14.20 (-0.2) | |
| 2nd place, silver medalist(s) | Walter Fabian Ferreira Maciel | Paraguarí | | | | | | | 13.90 (+1.1) | |
| 3rd place, bronze medalist(s) | Oscar Gill Ocampos | Central | | | | | | | 11.70 (+1.7) | |

==== Shot put throw ====
| Rank | Athlete | Department | 1 | 2 | 3 | 4 | 5 | 6 | Result | Notes |
|---|---|---|---|---|---|---|---|---|---|---|
| 1st place, gold medalist(s) | Victor Abel Fatecha Riveros | Cordillera | | | | | | | 13.27 | |
| 2nd place, silver medalist(s) | Larson Giovanni Diaz Martinez | Misiones | | | | | | | 13.05 | |
| 3rd place, bronze medalist(s) | Pablo Augusto Bareiro Acuña | Misiones | | | | | | | 12.22 | |
| 4 | Javier Bustto Willian | Misiones | | | | | | | 11.30 | |
| 5 | Jhony Siebert Orqueda | Central | | | | | | | 11.00 | |
| 6 | Santiago Luis Sasiain Gonzalez | Central | | | | | | | 10.83 | |
| 7 | Rodney Rene Morinigo Gonzalez | Central | | | | | | | 09.74 | |
| 8 | Daniel Benitez Davalos | Central | | | | | | | 09.54 | |
| 9 | Jesus Antonio Sanchez Servin | Central | | | | | | | 08.95 | |
| 10 | Ivan Guillermo Gonzalez Gamarra | Paraguarí | | | | | | | 08.75 | |

==== Discus throw ====
| Rank | Athlete | Department | 1 | 2 | 3 | 4 | 5 | 6 | Result | Notes |
|---|---|---|---|---|---|---|---|---|---|---|
| 1st place, gold medalist(s) | Victor Abel Fatecha Riveros | Cordillera | | | | | | | 40.35 | |
| 2nd place, silver medalist(s) | Larson Giovanni Diaz Martinez | Misiones | | | | | | | 40.20 | |
| 3rd place, bronze medalist(s) | Willian Javier Bustto | Misiones | | | | | | | 35.84 | |
| 4 | Santiago Luis Sasiain Gonzalez | Central | | | | | | | 34.95 | |
| 5 | Pablo Augusto Bareiro Acuña | Misiones | | | | | | | 33.80 | |
| 6 | Rodney Rene Morinigo Gonzalez | Central | | | | | | | 32.93 | |
| 7 | Daniel Benitez Davalos | Central | | | | | | | 31.13 | |
| 8 | Alcides Joel Lagrave Valenzuela | Caazapá | | | | | | | 26.30 | |

==== Javelin throw ====
| Rank | Athlete | Department | 1 | 2 | 3 | 4 | 5 | 6 | Result | Notes |
|---|---|---|---|---|---|---|---|---|---|---|
| 1st place, gold medalist(s) | Victor Abel Fatecha Riveros | Cordillera | | | | | | | 75.64 | |
| 2nd place, silver medalist(s) | Larson Giovanni Diaz Martinez | Misiones | | | | | | | 70.50 | |
| 3rd place, bronze medalist(s) | Alcides Joel Lagrave Valenzuela | Caazapá | | | | | | | 53.38 | |
| 4 | Maicol Willian Suarez Rodriguez | Misiones | | | | | | | 51.30 | |
| 5 | Daniel Benitez Davalos | Central | | | | | | | 50.95 | |
| 6 | Nicolas Augusto Gonzalez Rodriguez | Central | | | | | | | 48.14 | |
| 7 | Pablo Augusto Bareiro Acuña | Misiones | | | | | | | 45.00 | |
| 8 | Ronald Mijhail Britos Granado | Central | | | | | | | 43.58 | |
| 9 | Adalberto David Gonzalez Ibarrola | Central | | | | | | | 37.60 | |
| 10 | Luis Maria Ramirez Lugo Fernando | Central | | | | | | | 28.62 | |
| 11 | Rodney Rene Morinigo Gonzalez | Central | | | | | | | 28.25 | |

==== Hammer throw ====
| Rank | Athlete | Department | 1 | 2 | 3 | 4 | 5 | 6 | Result | Notes |
|---|---|---|---|---|---|---|---|---|---|---|
| 1st place, gold medalist(s) | Jesus Antonio Sanchez Servin | Central | | | | | | | 51.32 | |
| 2nd place, silver medalist(s) | Rodney Rene Morinigo Gonzalez | Central | | | | | | | 49.23 | |
| 3rd place, bronze medalist(s) | Santiago Luis Sasiain Gonzalez | Central | | | | | | | 48.28 | |
| 4 | Silvio Cesar Ovelar Barrios | Central | | | | | | | 47.47 | |
| 5 | Daniel Benitez Davalos | Central | | | | | | | 44.80 | |
| 6 | Victor Abel Fatecha Riveros | Cordillera | | | | | | | 25.70 | |
| 6 | Javier Bustto Willian | Misiones | | | | | | | 25.05 | |

=== Women's ===
==== High jump ====
| Rank | Athlete | Department | 1 | 2 | 3 | 4 | 5 | 6 | Result | Notes |
|---|---|---|---|---|---|---|---|---|---|---|
| 1st place, gold medalist(s) | Lizel Daniela Gomez Ybarrola | Central | | | | | | | 1.47 | |
| 2nd place, silver medalist(s) | Leryn Dahiana Franco Steneri | Central | | | | | | | 1.41 | |
| 3rd place, bronze medalist(s) | Eloisa María Ramirez Britos | Central | | | | | | | 1.30 | |

==== Long jump ====
| Rank | Athlete | Department | 1 | 2 | 3 | 4 | 5 | 6 | Result | Notes |
|---|---|---|---|---|---|---|---|---|---|---|
| 1st place, gold medalist(s) | Lizel Daniela Gomez Ybarrola | Central | | | | | | | 5.26 (+1.6) | |
| 2nd place, silver medalist(s) | Noelia Giselle Vera Aguilar | Central | | | | | | | 5.17 (+1.6) | |
| 3rd place, bronze medalist(s) | Fatima Denisse Amarilla Gaona | Central | | | | | | | 4.83 (+2.1) | |
| 4 | Leryn Dahiana Franco Steneri | Central | | | | | | | 4.82 (+2.1) | |
| 5 | Johana Elizabeth Duarte Melgarejo | N/A | | | | | | | 3.80 (+1.1) | |

==== Triple jump ====
| Rank | Athlete | Department | 1 | 2 | 3 | 4 | 5 | 6 | Result | Notes |
|---|---|---|---|---|---|---|---|---|---|---|
| 1st place, gold medalist(s) | Lizel Daniela Gomez Ybarrola | Central | | | | | | | 11.32 (+0.7) | |
| 2nd place, silver medalist(s) | Eloisa María Ramirez Britos | Central | | | | | | | (09.82 +1.3) | |

==== Shot put throw ====
| Rank | Athlete | Department | 1 | 2 | 3 | 4 | 5 | 6 | Result | Notes |
|---|---|---|---|---|---|---|---|---|---|---|
| 1st place, gold medalist(s) | Paola Carolina Miranda Cardozo | Central | | | | | | | 11.57 | |
| 2nd place, silver medalist(s) | Andrea Gisella Bordon Mancuello | Paraguarí | | | | | | | 11.26 | |
| 3rd place, bronze medalist(s) | Leryn Dahiana Franco Steneri | Central | | | | | | | 09.63 | |
| 4 | Noelia Asucena Caceres Ortega | Central | | | | | | | 08.35 | |
| 5 | Maria Belen Duette Quiñonez | Itapúa | | | | | | | 08.29 | |
| 6 | Rosa Maria Ramirez Britos | Central | | | | | | | 07.60 | |
| 7 | Jany Gabriela Rodriguez Gonvalves | N/A | | | | | | | 07.00 | |
| 8 | Rocio Gonzalez Ibarrola | N/A | | | | | | | 04.96 | |

==== Discus throw ====
| Rank | Athlete | Department | 1 | 2 | 3 | 4 | 5 | 6 | Result | Notes |
|---|---|---|---|---|---|---|---|---|---|---|
| 1st place, gold medalist(s) | Paola Carolina Miranda Cardozo | Central | | | | | | | 38.40 | |
| 2nd place, silver medalist(s) | Olga Katryna Subeldia Cabrera | Central | | | | | | | 36.50 | |
| 3rd place, bronze medalist(s) | Andrea Gisella Bordon Mancuello | Central | | | | | | | 32.95 | |
| 4 | Daisy Ivonne Gonzalez Arriola | Caaguazú | | | | | | | 27.35 | |
| 5 | Noelia Asucena Caceres Ortega | Central | | | | | | | 26.10 | |
| 6 | Maria Belen Duette Quiñonez | Itapúa | | | | | | | 24.05 | |

==== Javelin throw ====
| Rank | Athlete | Department | 1 | 2 | 3 | 4 | 5 | 6 | Result | Notes |
|---|---|---|---|---|---|---|---|---|---|---|
| 1st place, gold medalist(s) | Leryn Dahiana Franco Steneri | Central | | | | | | | 45.95 | |
| 2nd place, silver medalist(s) | Emi Fukuoka Galeano | Central | | | | | | | 35.53 | |
| 3rd place, bronze medalist(s) | Cinthia Johana Hermosilla Dominguez | Central | | | | | | | 30.52 | |
| 4 | Lizel Daniela Gomez Ybarrola | Central | | | | | | | 19.81 | |

==== Hammer throw ====
| Rank | Athlete | Department | 1 | 2 | 3 | 4 | 5 | 6 | Result | Notes |
|---|---|---|---|---|---|---|---|---|---|---|
| 1st place, gold medalist(s) | Paola Carolina Miranda Cardozo | Central | | | | | | | 59.43NR | |
| 2nd place, silver medalist(s) | Noelia Asucena Caceres Ortega | Central | | | | | | | 35.53 | |
| 3rd place, bronze medalist(s) | Daysa Yanira Candia Alvarez | Central | | | | | | | 46.45 | |
| 4 | Rosa Maria Ramirez Britos | Central | | | | | | | 37.12 | |
| 5 | Maria Belen Duette Quiñonez | Itapúa | | | | | | | 36.30 | |
| 6 | Herminia Almiron Fernandez | Paraguarí | | | | | | | 27.25 | |

== See also ==
- Sport in Paraguay
- Paraguayan Olympic Committee
- Paraguayan Athletics Federation
- Paraguayan records in athletics
- List of athletics clubs in Paraguay
