= Athletics in Paraguay =

Athletics in Paraguay in Paraguay is managed by the Federación Paraguaya de Atletismo. The sport is mainly practiced in the throwing modalities.

== History ==
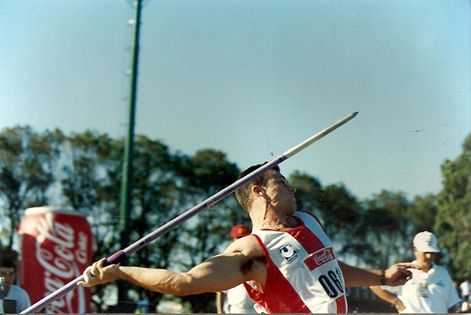
Edgar Baumann has the South American record in Javelin Throw with a mark of 84.70 metres in 1999.

=== National ===
At national level, national championships are disputed each year between athletics clubs in Paraguay that are affiliated with the Paraguayan Athletics Federation. The Asociación de Atletismo del Alto Paraná is recognized for having the best long-distance runners in the country whilst Sol de América and Paraguay Marathon Club have the best throwers and sprinters in the country.

The main venues for athletics championships in Paraguay are located at the Secretaría Nacional de Deportes in Asunción and at the Paraguayan Olympic Committee in Luque.

=== International ===
The principal Paraguayan representatives are:

- Edgar Baumann, who is the actual South American record holder in Javelin Throw.
- Victor Fatecha
- Leryn Franco
- Nery Kennedy
- Ramón Jiménez Gaona

Paraguayan newspaper ABC Color declared that Paraguay is the best place to find throwers.

During the 2010s decade, long-distance runners began to stand out, such as Derlis Ayala, Carmen Martínez and Maria Caballero.
