= 2016 Paraguayan Athletics Championships =

- Dates: 30 September – 2 October
- Host city: Luque, Paraguay
- Venue: Paraguayan Olympic Committee
- Level: Open
- Type: Outdoor

The 2016 Campeonato de la Victoria or 2016 Torneo de la Victoria will be held at the Paraguayan Olympic Committee in Luque, organized by Federación Paraguaya de Atletismo. It will be the 66th edition.

The competition serves as the Paraguayan Athletics Championships in track and field for the Republic of Paraguay, being the country's most important national athletics competitions.

== Qualification ==
Three competitions were disputed during the 2016 season, known as the Competition of the Family, and its results went towards the qualification of the final competition: De la Victoria. The first 8 to 12 athletes on the ranking list per event will qualify. As well as in Asunción, competitions were disputed in Alto Paraná, Caaguazú, Paraguarí, Guairá, Itapúa and Misiones. Fredy Maidana ranked in first position for the 100m event with 10.55s. General Champion of the Competition of the Family Inter Club was the Asociación de Atletismo del Alto Paraná of Ciudad del Este with 254 points.

== Results ==
- Results of the competition will be published on the official website of the Federación Paraguaya de Atletismo.

== See also ==
- Sport in Paraguay
- Paraguayan Olympic Committee
- Paraguayan Athletics Federation
- Paraguayan records in athletics
- List of athletics clubs in Paraguay
