= 2018 Ibero-American Championships in Athletics – Results =

These are the official results of the 2018 Ibero-American Championships in Athletics which took place on August 24, 25 and 26, 2018, in Trujillo, Peru.

== Men's results ==
=== 100 meters ===
Heats – August 24
Wind:
Heat 1: +0.5 m/s, Heat 2: -0.4 m/s

Rank	Heat	Name	Nationality	Time	Notes
1	2	Jorge Vides	Brazil	10.33	Q
2	1	Paulo André de Oliveira	Brazil	10.37	Q
3	1	Reynier Mena	Cuba	10.52	Q
4	2	Enrique Polanco	Chile	10.69	Q
5	1	Arián Téllez	Spain	10.71	Q
6	2	Andy Martínez	Peru	10.73	Q
7	1	José Andrés Salazar	El Salvador	10.81	q
8	1	Enzo Faulbaum	Chile	10.81	q
9	2	Jesús Antonio Cáceres	Paraguay	10.82	
10	1	Christopher Ortiz	Paraguay	10.88	
11	2	Giancarlo Mosquera	Colombia	10.93	
12	2	Pablo Roberto Abán	Bolivia	11.02	
13	1	Fabricio Mautino	Peru	11.09	
14	1	Jhon Valencia	Ecuador	11.17	
15	2	Jeffersón Quintero	Ecuador	11.45	

Final – August 24
Wind:
+0.7 m/s

Rank	Lane	Name	Nationality	Time	Notes
1st place, gold medalist(s)	5	Paulo André de Oliveira	Brazil	10.27	
2nd place, silver medalist(s)	4	Jorge Vides	Brazil	10.27	
3rd place, bronze medalist(s)	3	Reynier Mena	Cuba	10.47	
4	6	Enrique Polanco	Chile	10.56	
5	2	Arián Téllez	Spain	10.70	
6	7	Andy Martínez	Peru	10.70	
7	7	José Andrés Salazar	El Salvador	10.70	
8	1	Enzo Faulbaum	Chile	10.78	

=== 200 meters ===
Heats – August 25
Wind:
Heat 1: -0.2 m/s, Heat 2: -0.2 m/s

Rank	Heat	Name	Nationality	Time	Notes
1	1	Jorge Vides	Brazil	20.39	Q
2	2	Aldemir da Silva Júnior	Brazil	20.63	Q
3	2	Fredy Maidana	Paraguay	21.13	Q
4	1	Nery Brenes	Costa Rica	21.36	Q
5	2	José Andrés Salazar	El Salvador	21.44	Q
6	1	Nilo Duré	Paraguay	21.52	Q
7	1	Carlos Perlaza	Ecuador	21.55	q
8	2	Enzo Faulbaum	Chile	21.57	q
9	1	Giancarlo Mosquera	Colombia	21.82	
10	2	Luis Iriarte	Peru	22.33	
11	1	Fabrizio Vizcarra	Peru	22.47	

Final – August 26
Wind:
+0.7 m/s

Rank	Lane	Name	Nationality	Time	Notes
1st place, gold medalist(s)	4	Jorge Vides	Brazil	20.34	
2nd place, silver medalist(s)	5	Aldemir da Silva Júnior	Brazil	20.42	
3rd place, bronze medalist(s)	6	Nery Brenes	Costa Rica	20.88	
4	3	Fredy Maidana	Paraguay	20.97	
5	2	José Andrés Salazar	El Salvador	21.46	
6	8	Enzo Faulbaum	Chile	21.53	
7	7	Nilo Duré	Paraguay	21.75	
	1	Carlos Perlaza	Ecuador	DNF	

=== 400 meters ===
August 25

Rank	Lane	Name	Nationality	Time	Notes
1st place, gold medalist(s)	3	Lucas Carvalho	Brazil	45.92	
2nd place, silver medalist(s)	4	Nery Brenes	Costa Rica	46.27	
3rd place, bronze medalist(s)	5	Ricardo dos Santos	Portugal	46.45	
4	6	David Cetre	Ecuador	47.80	
5	2	Carlos Perlaza	Ecuador	47.94	

=== 800 meters ===
August 26

Rank	Name	Nationality	Time	Notes
1st place, gold medalist(s)	Thiago André	Brazil	1:46.73	
2nd place, silver medalist(s)	Andrés Arroyo	Puerto Rico	1:47.62	
3rd place, bronze medalist(s)	Alejandro Peirano	Chile	1:48.62	
4	Marco Vilca	Peru	1:49.82	
5	Rafael Muñoz	Chile	1:50.04	
6	Jean Andrés Jacome	Ecuador	1:51.79	
7	Carlos Arellano	Ecuador	1:52.91	

=== 1500 meters ===
August 25

Rank	Name	Nationality	Time	Notes
1st place, gold medalist(s)	Llorenç Sales	Spain	3:48.27	
2nd place, silver medalist(s)	Thiago André	Brazil	3:48.48	
3rd place, bronze medalist(s)	Alfredo Santana	Puerto Rico	3:49.50	
4	Fabian Manrique	Argentina	3:50.15	
5	Erik Estrada	Puerto Rico	3:52.78	
6	Michael Alba	Chile	3:52.88	
7	Cleber Cisneros	Peru	3:53.42	
8	Gerson Montes	Ecuador	3:53.77	
9	Carlos Arellano	Ecuador	3:54.80	
10	Carlos San Martín	Colombia	3:55.50	
11	Eduardo Gregorio	Uruguay	3:56.75	

=== 3000 meters ===
August 26

Rank	Name	Nationality	Time	Notes
1st place, gold medalist(s)	Altobeli da Silva	Brazil	7:57.52	
2nd place, silver medalist(s)	Alfredo Santana	Puerto Rico	8:01.20	
3rd place, bronze medalist(s)	José Luis Rojas	Peru	8:04.00	PB
4	Yuri Labra	Peru	8:06.33	
5	Daniel Toroya	Bolivia	8:06.51	
6	Nassim Hassaous	Spain	8:15.36	
7	Rafael Loza	Ecuador	8:23.69	
8	Carlos San Martín	Colombia	8:32.65	
9	Juan Carlos Huiza	Bolivia	8:34.62	
	Fabian Manrique	Argentina	DNF	
	Miguel Barzola	Argentina	DNS	

=== 5000 meters ===
August 24

Rank	Name	Nationality	Time	Notes
1st place, gold medalist(s)	José Luis Rojas	Peru	13:42.38	
2nd place, silver medalist(s)	Juan Antonio Pérez	Spain	13:48.02	
3rd place, bronze medalist(s)	Luis Ostos	Peru	13:48.57	
4	Daniel Toroya	Bolivia	14:00.97	
5	Rafael Loza	Ecuador	14:06.68	
6	Miguel Barzola	Argentina	14:30.65	
7	Juan Carlos Huiza	Bolivia	14:46.14	
8	Jorge Luis Arias	Ecuador	15:24.78	

=== 110 meters hurdles ===
August 25
Wind: -0.2 m/s

Rank	Lane	Name	Nationality	Time	Notes
1st place, gold medalist(s)	4	Gabriel Constantino	Brazil	13.61	
2nd place, silver medalist(s)	5	Javier McFarlane	Peru	14.04	
3rd place, bronze medalist(s)	7	Agustín Carrera	Argentina	14.16	
4	6	Jonathan Santiago	Puerto Rico	14.17	
5	2	Ricardo Torres	Puerto Rico	14.31	
6	3	Juan Pablo Germain	Chile	14.50	
7	8	Jorge McFarlane	Peru	14.61	
8	1	Marcos Herrera	Ecuador	14.73	

=== 400 meters hurdles ===
Heats – August 25

Rank	Heat	Name	Nationality	Time	Notes
1	2	Leandro Zamora	Cuba	50.31	Q
2	1	Ramfis Vega	Puerto Rico	50.57	Q
3	2	Emmanuel Niño	Costa Rica	50.94	Q
4	1	Gerald Drummond	Costa Rica	51.12	Q
5	1	Márcio Teles	Brazil	51.13	Q
6	1	Guillermo Ruggeri	Argentina	51.21	q
7	1	Alfredo Sepúlveda	Chile	51.40	q
8	2	Pablo Andrés Ibáñez	El Salvador	51.53	Q
9	1	Emerson Chala	Ecuador	52.17	
10	2	Ian Corozo	Ecuador	53.46	
11	2	Paulo César Herrera	Peru	53.71	
12	1	Pierre Lizarzaburu	Peru	55.12	
	2	Jordin Andrade	Cape Verde	DNS	

Final – August 26

Rank	Lane	Name	Nationality	Time	Notes
1st place, gold medalist(s)	2	Márcio Teles	Brazil	49.64	
2nd place, silver medalist(s)	6	Gerald Drummond	Costa Rica	49.80	
3rd place, bronze medalist(s)	4	Leandro Zamora	Cuba	49.85	
4	5	Ramfis Vega	Puerto Rico	49.94	
5	3	Emmanuel Niño	Costa Rica	50.47	
6	7	Guillermo Ruggeri	Argentina	50.54	
7	8	Pablo Andrés Ibáñez	El Salvador	50.92	
8	1	Alfredo Sepúlveda	Chile	51.51	

=== 3000 meters steeplechase ===
August 25

Rank	Name	Nationality	Time	Notes
1st place, gold medalist(s)	Altobeli da Silva	Brazil	8:35.57	
2nd place, silver medalist(s)	Daniel Arce	Spain	8:36.33	
	Mario Bazán*	Peru	8:40.23	
3rd place, bronze medalist(s)	Yuri Labra	Peru	8:41.29	
4	Jonathan Romeo	Spain	8:55.24	
5	Gerson Montes	Ecuador	9:12.86	
6	Jorge Luis Arias	Ecuador	9:13.63	
7	Walter Nina	Peru	9:24.43	

=== 4 × 100 meters relay ===
August 25

Rank	Lane	Nation	Competitors	Time	Notes
1st place, gold medalist(s)	3	Brazil	Gabriel Constantino, Jorge Vides, Aldemir da Silva Júnior, Paulo André de Oliveira	38.78	
2nd place, silver medalist(s)	5	Paraguay	Fredy Maidana, Christopher Ortiz, Giovanni Díaz, Nilo Duré	39.99	NR
3rd place, bronze medalist(s)	6	Peru	Fabricio Mautino, Andy Martínez, Luis Iriarte, Fabricio Vizcarra	40.69	
4	4	Ecuador	Jhon Valencia, Jeffersón Quintero, Carlos Perlaza, Steeven Salas	41.15	

=== 4 × 400 meters relay ===
August 26

Rank	Nation	Competitors	Time	Notes
1st place, gold medalist(s)	Chile	Enzo Faulbaum, Alejandro Peirano, Rafael Muñoz, Alfredo Sepúlveda	3:10.77	
2nd place, silver medalist(s)	Ecuador	Carlos Perlaza, Ian Corozo, Emerson Alejandro Chala, David Cetre	3:11.73	
3rd place, bronze medalist(s)	Peru	Luis Iriarte, Pierre Lizarazburu, Marco Vilca, Paulo César Herrera	3:15.59	

=== 20,000 meters walk ===
August 26

Rank	Name	Nationality	Time	Notes
1st place, gold medalist(s)	Mauricio Arteaga	Ecuador	1:22:18.16	
2nd place, silver medalist(s)	César Rodríguez	Peru	1:23:22.96	NR
3rd place, bronze medalist(s)	Juan Manuel Cano	Argentina	1:24:07.00	
4	Yerko Araya	Chile	1:25:07.20	
5	Paolo Yurivilca	Peru	1:25:17.23	
6	Ronald Quispe	Bolivia	1:29:10.20	
	David Hurtado	Ecuador	DQ	
	José Carlos Mamani	Peru	DQ	
	Luis Henry Campos	Peru	DNF	

=== High jump ===
August 24

Rank	Name	Nationality	1.90	1.95	2.00	2.05	2.10	2.15	2.18	2.21	2.24	Result	Notes
1st place, gold medalist(s)	Carlos Layoy	Argentina	–	–	o	–	o	o	–	o	xxx	2.21	
2nd place, silver medalist(s)	Talles Silva	Brazil	–	–	–	–	o	xo	–	xo	xxx	2.21	
3rd place, bronze medalist(s)	Fernando Ferreira	Brazil	–	–	–	o	o	xx–	x			2.10	
4	Daniel Cortez	Colombia	–	–	o	xo	xx					2.05	
5	Jan Westreicher	Peru	–	o	xo	xxx						2.00	
6	Jesie Corozo	Ecuador	o	–	xxx							1.90	

=== Pole vault ===
August 24

Rank	Name	Nationality	4.75	4.90	5.00	5.10	5.20	5.30	5.35	5.40	5.55	Result	Notes
1st place, gold medalist(s)	Augusto Dutra de Oliveira	Brazil	–	–	–	–	o	–	–	o	xxx	5.40	
2nd place, silver medalist(s)	Germán Chiaraviglio	Argentina	–	–	–	–	o	–	xxx			5.20	
3rd place, bronze medalist(s)	Didac Salas	Spain	–	–	–	o	–	xxx				5.10	
4	José Rodolfo Pacho	Ecuador	–	o	–	xxx						4.90	
	Dyander Pacho	Ecuador	xxx									NM	
	Walter Viáfara	Colombia	–	–	–	xx–	x					NM	
	Josué Gutiérrez	Peru										DNS	

=== Long jump ===
August 25

Rank	Name	Nationality	#1	#2	#3	#4	#5	#6	Result	Notes
1st place, gold medalist(s)	José Luis Mandros	Peru	x	7.77	7.77	7.79	7.87	x	7.87	
2nd place, silver medalist(s)	Daniel Pineda	Chile	7.78	7.76	7.81	7.78	7.06	7.81	7.81	
3rd place, bronze medalist(s)	Emiliano Lasa	Uruguay	7.31	x	x	7.55	7.79	x	7.79	
4	Jean Marie Okutu	Spain	7.27w	7.62	x	7.75	7.65	7.70	7.75	
5	Alexsandro de Melo	Brazil	7.69	7.65	7.69	7.67	6.24	7.75	7.75	
6	Michael Williams	Puerto Rico	7.10	7.19	7.15	7.27w	7.45	7.25	7.45	
7	Bryan Castro	Ecuador	7.37	7.44	7.14	7.39	7.28	x	7.44	
8	Eduardo Landeta	Ecuador	6.98	x	–	–	–	–	6.98	
9	Fabricio Mautino	Peru	x	x	6.85				6.85	
10	Ángel Marcelo Suárez	Nicaragua	6.36	x	6.53				6.53	

=== Triple jump ===
August 26

Rank	Name	Nationality	Result	Notes
1st place, gold medalist(s)	Cristian Nápoles	Cuba	16.81	
2nd place, silver medalist(s)	Pablo Torrijos	Spain	16.74	
3rd place, bronze medalist(s)	Alexsandro de Melo	Brazil	15.94	
4	Maximiliano Díaz	Argentina	15.90	
5	Kevin Canchingre	Ecuador	14.60	
6	Augusto Miró	Peru	14.58	

=== Shot put ===
August 25

Rank	Name	Nationality	#1	#2	#3	#4	#5	#6	Result	Notes
1st place, gold medalist(s)	Darlan Romani	Brazil	20.74	20.16	20.71	20.67	20.60	20.07	20.74	CR
2nd place, silver medalist(s)	Tsanko Arnaudov	Portugal	x	19.22	x	x	19.34	x	19.34	
3rd place, bronze medalist(s)	Eduardo Espín	Ecuador	15.79	15.85	15.75	15.83	16.13	15.81	16.13	
	Stefano Paz	Peru							DNS	

=== Discus throw ===
August 25

Rank	Name	Nationality	#1	#2	#3	#4	#5	#6	Result	Notes
1st place, gold medalist(s)	Mauricio Ortega	Colombia	58.91	x	x	60.49	59.54	x	60.49	
2nd place, silver medalist(s)	Juan José Caicedo	Ecuador	55.91	56.52	57.04	x	54.87	58.68	58.68	
3rd place, bronze medalist(s)	Douglas dos Reis	Brazil	x	40.70	55.75	56.45	56.91	56.66	56.91	
4	Stefano Paz	Peru	44.29	45.62	x	47.13	45.64	46.25	47.13	

=== Hammer throw ===
August 24

Rank	Name	Nationality	#1	#2	#3	#4	#5	#6	Result	Notes
1st place, gold medalist(s)	Javier Cienfuegos	Spain	72.24	71.85	72.32	74.71	72.38	73.70	74.71	
2nd place, silver medalist(s)	Joaquín Gómez	Argentina	66.70	72.23	74.64	73.55	x	x	74.64	
3rd place, bronze medalist(s)	Roberto Sawyers	Costa Rica	73.16	72.16	72.13	70.57	x	71.08	73.16	
4	Humberto Mansilla	Chile	69.43	71.20	72.02	72.60	x	71.00	72.60	
5	Gabriel Kehr	Chile	71.54	x	x	68.53	70.74	70.81	71.54	
6	Joseph Melgar	Peru	60.76	x	59.10	x	59.99	59.61	60.76	
7	Cristián Suárez	Ecuador	55.50	55.82	x	56.31	58.39	53.30	58.39	
8	Estalin Rodríguez	Ecuador	55.27	57.04	56.14	55.83	57.81	54.33	57.81	

=== Javelin throw ===
August 25

Rank	Name	Nationality	#1	#2	#3	#4	#5	#6	Result	Notes
1st place, gold medalist(s)	Arley Ibargüen	Colombia	66.37	75.50	x	71.45	x	x	75.50	
2nd place, silver medalist(s)	Francisco Muse	Chile	70.08	66.16	67.79	73.10	71.23	71.63	73.10	
3rd place, bronze medalist(s)	Giovanni Díaz	Paraguay	67.33	65.37	69.25	66.59	64.42	71.11	71.11	
4	Fabian Jara	Paraguay	67.61	70.99	66.19	65.82	67.65	69.81	70.99	
5	José Escobar	Ecuador	64.81	x	67.33	63.27	63.08	67.90	67.90	
6	Kevin Ortiz	Puerto Rico	63.06	65.44	62.53	64.70	x	x	65.44	
7	William Torres	Ecuador	60.96	56.43	62.68	x	60.36	61.86	62.68	
8	Marcos Paz	Peru	54.34	53.67	–	–	–	–	54.34	

=== Decathlon ===
August 24–25

The highest mark recorded in each event is highlighted in yellow

Rank	Athlete	Nationality	100m	LJ	SP	HJ	400m	110m H	DT	PV	JT	1500m	Points	Notes
1st place, gold medalist(s)	Felipe dos Santos	Brazil	10.67	7.21w	13.41	1.94	50.07	14.24	38.02	4.60	55.55	4:55.99	7663	
2nd place, silver medalist(s)	Sergio Pandiani	Argentina	11.13	7.11w	12.67	1.91	50.31	15.36	39.88	3.80	56.29	4:31.03	7293	
3rd place, bronze medalist(s)	Miguel Monsalve	Peru	11.34	6.84w	9.44	1.73	51.80	15.93	24.03	3.00	32.82	4:39.57	5785	
4	Esteban Ibañez	El Salvador	11.68	5.80w	9.16	1.88	51.92	15.73	26.35	NM	42.47	4:36.47	5455	
5	Luiz Alberto de Araújo	Brazil	11.09	NM	14.70	1.91	DNF	DNS	–	–	–	–	5455	

== Women's results ==
=== 100 meters ===
Heats – August 24
Wind:
Heat 1: +1.3 m/s, Heat 2: +0.5 m/s

Rank	Heat	Name	Nationality	Time	Notes
1	1	Vitória Cristina Rosa	Brazil	11.37	Q
2	2	Rosângela Santos	Brazil	11.49	Q
3	1	Narcisa Landazuri	Ecuador	11.59	Q
4	2	Ángela Tenorio	Ecuador	11.60	Q
5	1	Eliecith Palacios	Colombia	11.88	Q
6	2	Genoiska Cancel	Puerto Rico	12.12	Q
7	1	Alinny Delgadillo	Bolivia	12.32	q
8	1	Triana Alonso	Peru	12.43	q
9	2	Gabriela Delgado	Peru	12.51	
10	2	Guadalupe Torrez	Bolivia	12.56	

Final – August 24
Wind:
+1.1 m/s

Rank	Lane	Name	Nationality	Time	Notes
1st place, gold medalist(s)	4	Vitória Cristina Rosa	Brazil	11.33	
2nd place, silver medalist(s)	6	Ángela Tenorio	Ecuador	11.36	
3rd place, bronze medalist(s)	5	Rosângela Santos	Brazil	11.44	
4	3	Narcisa Landazuri	Ecuador	11.71	
5	7	Genoiska Cancel	Puerto Rico	12.09	
6	2	Eliecith Palacios	Colombia	12.22	
7	1	Alinny Delgadillo	Bolivia	12.40	
8	8	Triana Alonso	Peru	12.53	

=== 200 meters ===
August 26
Wind: +0.3 m/s

Rank	Lane	Name	Nationality	Time	Notes
1st place, gold medalist(s)	4	Vitória Cristina Rosa	Brazil	22.90	
2nd place, silver medalist(s)	5	Rosângela Santos	Brazil	23.92	
3rd place, bronze medalist(s)	3	Anahí Suárez	Ecuador	24.07	
4	6	María Fernanda Mackenna	Chile	24.54	
5	7	Martina Weil	Chile	24.81	
6	8	Alinny Delgadillo	Bolivia	25.23	
	2	Virginia Villalba	Ecuador	DNF	
	1	Gabriela Delgado	Peru	DNS	

=== 400 meters ===
Heats – August 24

Rank	Heat	Name	Nationality	Time	Notes
1	2	Laura Bueno	Spain	52.69	Q
2	2	Cátia Azevedo	Portugal	53.02	Q
3	2	Desiré Bermúdez	Costa Rica	53.51	Q
4	1	Geisa Coutinho	Brazil	53.77	Q
5	2	Noelia Martínez	Argentina	54.21	q
6	1	María Fernanda Mackenna	Chile	54.74	Q
7	2	Virginia Villalba	Ecuador	54.89	q
8	1	María Ayelén Diogo	Argentina	55.05	Q
9	1	Kimberly Cardoza	Peru	55.13	
10	2	Maitte Torres	Peru	56.04	
11	1	Nicole Minota	Ecuador	57.07	

Final – August 25

Rank	Lane	Name	Nationality	Time	Notes
1st place, gold medalist(s)	5	Cátia Azevedo	Portugal	52.26	
2nd place, silver medalist(s)	6	Geisa Coutinho	Brazil	52.57	
3rd place, bronze medalist(s)	4	Laura Bueno	Spain	52.88	
4	3	Desiré Bermúdez	Costa Rica	53.96	
5	2	Noelia Martínez	Argentina	54.38	
6	7	María Fernanda Mackenna	Chile	54.52	
7	1	Virginia Villalba	Ecuador	55.03	
8	8	María Ayelén Diogo	Argentina	55.13	

=== 800 meters ===
August 26

Rank	Name	Nationality	Time	Notes
1st place, gold medalist(s)	Esther Guerrero	Spain	2:04.55	
2nd place, silver medalist(s)	Deborah Rodríguez	Uruguay	2:06.19	
3rd place, bronze medalist(s)	Natalia Romero	Spain	2:06.54	
4	Mariana Borelli	Argentina	2:08.63	
5	Andrea Calderón	Ecuador	2:10.24	
6	Irene Navarrete	Ecuador	2:20.34	
	Joyceline Monteiro	Portugal	DNS	
	Rosibel García	Colombia	DNS	

=== 1500 meters ===
August 25

Rank	Name	Nationality	Time	Notes
1st place, gold medalist(s)	Solange Pereira	Spain	4:18.31	
2nd place, silver medalist(s)	María Pía Fernández	Uruguay	4:18.65	
3rd place, bronze medalist(s)	Mariana Borelli	Argentina	4:20.74	
4	Mary Zenaida Granja	Ecuador	4:25.24	
5	Micaela Levaggi	Argentina	4:26.20	
6	Carmen Toaquiza	Ecuador	4:33.05	
7	Rosibel García	Colombia	4:38.21	
8	Helen Daniela Baltazar	Bolivia	4:40.58	
	Andrea Ferris	Panama	DNS	

=== 3000 meters ===
August 26

Rank	Name	Nationality	Time	Notes
1st place, gold medalist(s)	María Pía Fernández	Uruguay	9:16.16	
2nd place, silver medalist(s)	Tatiane da Silva	Brazil	9:18.39	
3rd place, bronze medalist(s)	Florencia Borelli	Argentina	9:19.09	
4	Nuria Lugeros	Spain	9:19.26	
5	Saida Meneses	Peru	9:22.39	
6	Mary Zeneida Granja	Ecuador	9:23.78	
7	Micaela Levaggi	Argentina	9:26.14	
8	Soledad Torre	Peru	9:30.64	
9	Katherine Tisalema	Ecuador	9:34.52	
10	Edith Mamani	Bolivia	9:34.79	
11	Salome Mendoza	Bolivia	9:35.80	

=== 5000 meters ===
August 24

Rank	Name	Nationality	Time	Notes
1st place, gold medalist(s)	Luz Mery Rojas	Peru	16:08.77	
2nd place, silver medalist(s)	Saida Meneses	Peru	16:09.75	
3rd place, bronze medalist(s)	Nuria Lugeros	Spain	16:22.71	
4	Carmen Toaquiza	Ecuador	16:49.89	
5	Salome Mendoza	Bolivia	17:04.44	
6	Helen Baltazar	Bolivia	17:19.53	
	Florencia Borelli	Argentina	DNF	
	Silvia Ortiz	Ecuador	DNS	

=== 100 meters hurdles ===
August 25
Wind: -0.2 m/s

Rank	Lane	Name	Nationality	Time	Notes
1st place, gold medalist(s)	4	Andrea Vargas	Costa Rica	13.04	
2nd place, silver medalist(s)	3	Maribel Caicedo	Ecuador	13.63	
3rd place, bronze medalist(s)	5	Rayane Santos	Brazil	13.68	
4	6	Diana Bazalar	Peru	13.94	
5	7	Nancy Sandoval	El Salvador	14.10	NR
6	1	Triana Alonso	Peru	14.59	
7	2	Adriana Lastra	Ecuador	14.60	

=== 400 meters hurdles ===
August 25

Rank	Lane	Name	Nationality	Time	Notes
1st place, gold medalist(s)	5	Fiorella Chiappe	Argentina	56.25	
2nd place, silver medalist(s)	3	Daniela Rojas	Costa Rica	57.53	
3rd place, bronze medalist(s)	6	Valeria Cabezas	Colombia	57.74	
4	2	Kimberly Cardoza	Peru	58.36	NR
5	7	Marina Poroso	Ecuador	58.36	
6	8	Valeria Baron	Argentina	59.69	
7	1	Adriana Andrade	El Salvador	68.52	
	4	Gianna Woodruff	Panama	DNS	

=== 3000 meters steeplechase ===
August 25

Rank	Name	Nationality	Time	Notes
1st place, gold medalist(s)	Tatiane da Silva	Brazil	9:48.40	
2nd place, silver medalist(s)	María José Pérez	Spain	9:55.63	
3rd place, bronze medalist(s)	Belén Casetta	Argentina	10:07.20	
4	Tania Chávez	Bolivia	10:11.01	
5	Katherine Tisalema	Ecuador	10:11.99	
6	Margarita Nuñez	Peru	10:13.31	
7	Edith Mamani	Bolivia	10:25.22	
8	Rina Cjuro	Peru	10:30.62	
9	Asheley Laureano	Puerto Rico	10:41.98	
	Andrea Ferris	Panama	DNS	

=== 4 × 100 meters relay ===
August 25

Rank	Lane	Nation	Competitors	Time	Notes
1st place, gold medalist(s)	5	Peru	Gabriela Delgado, Triana Alonso, Diana Bazalar, Paola Mautino	46.76	
2nd place, silver medalist(s)	4	Ecuador	Maribel Caicedo, Ángela Tenorio, Gabriela Suárez, Marina Poroso	46.94	
3rd place, bronze medalist(s)	3	Bolivia	Alinny Delgadillo, Guadalupe Torrez, Danitza Avila, Valeria Quispe	47.39	

=== 4 × 400 meters relay ===
August 26

Rank	Nation	Competitors	Time	Notes
1st place, gold medalist(s)	Portugal	Rivinilda Mentai, Joceline Monteiro, Cátia Azevedo, Dorothé Évora	3:36.49	
2nd place, silver medalist(s)	Argentina	María Ayelén Diogo, Valeria Barón, Noelia Martínez, Fiorella Chiappe	3:36.99	
3rd place, bronze medalist(s)	Spain	Natalia Romero, Solange Pereira, Esther Guerrero, Laura Bueno	3:38.32	
4	Ecuador	Marina Poroso, Coraima Cortez, Nicole Minota, Virginia Villalba	3:43.33	
5	Chile	Martina Weil, María José Echeverría, Carmen Mancilla, María Fernanda Mackenna	3:43.56	

=== 10,000 meters walk ===
August 25

Rank	Name	Nationality	Time	Notes
1st place, gold medalist(s)	Sandra Arenas	Colombia	42:02.99	CR, AR, WL
2nd place, silver medalist(s)	Kimberly García	Peru	42:56.97	NR
3rd place, bronze medalist(s)	Glenda Morejón	Ecuador	44:12.75	NR
4	Maritza Guamán	Ecuador	44:33.19	
	Magaly Bonilla*	Ecuador	44:53.65	
5	Júlia Takács	Spain	45:15.69	
	Mary Luz Andía*	Peru	47:41.09	
	Evelyn Inga	Peru	DNF	

=== High jump ===
August 25

Rank	Name	Nationality	1.50	1.55	1.60	1.65	1.70	1.75	1.78	1.81	1.84	1.93	Result	Notes
1st place, gold medalist(s)	María Fernanda Murillo	Colombia	–	–	–	–	o	o	o	o	o	xxx	1.84	
2nd place, silver medalist(s)	Lorena Aires	Uruguay	–	–	–	–	o	xo	xo	xxo	xxx		1.81	
3rd place, bronze medalist(s)	Candy Toche	Peru	–	o	o	o	o	xxx					1.70	
4	Jennyfer Canchingre	Ecuador	o	xxx									1.50	

=== Pole vault ===
August 25

Rank	Name	Nationality	3.65	3.85	4.00	4.10	4.20	4.30	4.40	4.50	Result	Notes
1st place, gold medalist(s)	Juliana Campos	Brazil	–	–	o	o	xo	xo	xxo	xxx	4.40	
2nd place, silver medalist(s)	Maialen Axpe	Spain	–	o	xo	xxo	o	xxx			4.20	
3rd place, bronze medalist(s)	Katherine Castillo	Colombia	–	o	o	o	xxo	xx			4.20	
4	Mónica Clemente	Spain	–	o	o	xxo	xxx				4.10	
5	Nicole Hein	Peru	–	o	o	xxx					4.00	
6	Lisa Salomon	Cuba	–	xo	o	xxx					4.00	
7	Ana Quiñonez	Ecuador	o	xo	xxx						3.85	

=== Long jump ===
August 24

Rank	Name	Nationality	#1	#2	#3	#4	#5	#6	Result	Notes
1st place, gold medalist(s)	Juliet Itoya	Spain	x	6.45	6.73w	6.20w	6.49w	6.37w	6.73w	
2nd place, silver medalist(s)	Eliane Martins	Brazil	x	x	6.37	6.44w	6.66w	x	6.66w	
3rd place, bronze medalist(s)	Fátima Diame	Spain	6.40w	6.18	6.23w	5.96	6.51w	6.50	6.51w	
4	Paola Mautino	Peru	6.19w	x	6.45w	6.38	x	6.49w	6.49w	
5	Valeria Quispe	Bolivia	5.74	x	5.96w	x	x	6.03w	6.03w	
6	Silvana Segura	Peru	5.94	x	5.96	x	5.96w	5.93w	5.96	
7	Adriana Chila	Ecuador	5.57	5.84w	5.73	5.66w	5.37	5.69	5.84w	

=== Triple jump ===
August 25

Rank	Name	Nationality	#1	#2	#3	#4	#5	#6	Result	Notes
1st place, gold medalist(s)	Yosiris Urrutia	Colombia	x	14.14w	13.94	14.08w	x	x	14.14w	
2nd place, silver medalist(s)	Susana Costa	Portugal	13.60	x	13.76	13.69	x	x	13.76	
3rd place, bronze medalist(s)	Silvana Segura	Peru	x	13.22	x	13.46	13.25	13.36	13.46	
4	Lecabela Quaresma	Portugal	x	13.24w	x	12.80	x	13.04	13.24w	
5	Valeria Quispe	Bolivia	12.45	12.96	x	13.12	x	x	13.12	
6	Adriana Chila	Ecuador	12.19	12.58	12.51	12.54	12.58	12.00	12.58	
7	Candy Toche	Peru	12.01	12.29	12.19w	x	x	x	12.29	

=== Shot put ===
August 26

Rank	Name	Nationality	#1	#2	#3	#4	#5	#6	Result	Notes
1st place, gold medalist(s)	Geisa Arcanjo	Brazil	x	18.10	17.26	17.39	x	x	18.10	
2nd place, silver medalist(s)	Keely Medeiros	Brazil	16.57	16.64	16.53	16.38	16.50	15.35	16.64	
3rd place, bronze medalist(s)	Ivanna Gallardo	Chile	14.82	x	x	x	15.05	14.93	15.05	
4	Ginger Quintero	Ecuador	12.50	12.80	x	12.22	x	x	12.80	

=== Discus throw ===
August 24

Rank	Name	Nationality	#1	#2	#3	#4	#5	#6	Result	Notes
1st place, gold medalist(s)	Andressa de Morais	Brazil	x	62.02	58.43	x	x	–	62.02	
2nd place, silver medalist(s)	Fernanda Martins	Brazil	57.22	x	60.14	x	57.52	x	60.14	
3rd place, bronze medalist(s)	Irina Rodrigues	Portugal	x	58.78	x	56.18	54.92	58.86	58.86	
4	Ivanna Gallardo	Chile	x	49.03	50.51	50.67	x	49.62	50.67	
	Aixa Middleton	Panama							DNS	

=== Hammer throw ===
August 25

Rank	Name	Nationality	#1	#2	#3	#4	#5	#6	Result	Notes
1st place, gold medalist(s)	Jennifer Dahlgren	Argentina	x	x	61.12	68.89	66.96	67.17	68.89	
2nd place, silver medalist(s)	Rosa Rodríguez	Venezuela	65.41	67.93	x	x	63.63	x	67.93	
3rd place, bronze medalist(s)	Berta Castells	Spain	x	65.55	65.28	66.68	64.71	65.42	66.68	
4	Valeria Chuiliquinga	Ecuador	64.21	66.54	x	65.12	x	64.88	66.54	
5	Elianis Despaigne	Cuba	63.57	64.63	64.92	59.66	64.77	66.46	66.46	
6	Mariana Marcelino	Brazil	x	65.78	x	63.46	x	64.44	65.78	
7	Ximena Zorrilla	Peru	55.59	56.78	x	x	55.70	54.63	56.78	

=== Javelin throw ===
August 26

Rank	Name	Nationality	Result	Notes
1st place, gold medalist(s)	María Lucelly Murillo	Colombia	59.51	
2nd place, silver medalist(s)	Arantza Moreno	Spain	59.37	
3rd place, bronze medalist(s)	Laila Domingos	Brazil	58.24	
4	Laura Paredes	Paraguay	52.48	
5	Lidia Parada	Spain	51.00	
6	Nadia Requena	Peru	46.86	
7	Linda Gonzales	Ecuador	46.41	

=== Heptathlon ===
August 25–26

The highest mark recorded in each event is highlighted in yellow

Rank	Athlete	Nationality	100m H	HJ	SP	200m	LJ	JT	800m	Points	Notes
1st place, gold medalist(s)	Ana Camila Pirelli	Paraguay	14.08	1.66	13.78	25.32	5.67	47.12	2:13.40	5879	
2nd place, silver medalist(s)	Luisarys Toledo	Venezuela	14.81	1.63	11.58	24.88	6.13	45.13	2:14.76	5721	
	Jennyfer Canchingre	Ecuador	15.75	1.51	9.87	36.32	DNS	–	–	DNF	
