= Plinio Penzzi =

Paraguayan long-distance runner

Plinio Penzzi is a former Paraguayan long-distance runner who represented Paraguay at the 2003 South American Cross Country Championships. He is now the secretary, coach and organizer of the Federación Paraguaya de Atletismo. He has coached Christopher Ortiz, Fredy Maidana, Larson Díaz, Víctor Fatecha, Ana Camila Pirelli and Laura Paredes.

== Competition record ==
=== International competitions ===
| Year | Competition | Venue | Position | Event | Notes |
Representing Paraguay
| 2003 | 2003 South American Cross Country Championships | Asunción, Paraguay | 11th | 12 km | 45:41 |
