= 2013 Paraguayan Athletics Championships =

- Dates: October 5–6
- Host city: Asunción, Paraguay
- Venue: Secretaria Nacional de Deportes
- Level: Open
- Type: Outdoor

The 2013 Campeonato de la Victoria or 2013 Torneo de la Victoria was held at the Secretaria Nacional de Deportes in Asunción, organized by Federación Paraguaya de Atletismo. It was the 63rd edition.

The competition serves as the Paraguayan Athletics Championships in track and field for the Republic of Paraguay, being the country's most important national athletics competitions.

== Results ==
- Results of the competition were published on the official website of the Federación Paraguaya de Atletismo.

=== Women's ===
==== Javelin throw ====
Rank	Athlete	Department	1	2	3	4	5	6	Result	Notes
1st place, gold medalist(s)	Leryn Dahiana Franco Steneri	Central							50.51	
2nd place, silver medalist(s)	Anna Camila Pirelli Cubas	Misiones							46.56	
3rd place, bronze medalist(s)	Laura Melissa Paredes Meza	Central							44.15	
4	Fatima Denisse Amarilla Gaona	Central							29.41	
5	Cinthia Hermosilla	Central							25.29	
6	Nilsa Mariela Enciso Chaparro	N/A							24.31	
7	Maria Cristina Pavon Samaniego	Central							22.95	
8	Lilian Milena Navarro Sanchez	Central							16.29	

==== Hammer throw ====
Rank	Athlete	Department	1	2	3	4	5	6	Result	Notes
1st place, gold medalist(s)	Paola Carolina Miranda Cardozo	Central							52.37	
2nd place, silver medalist(s)	Noelia Asucena Caceres Ortega	Central							46.70	
3rd place, bronze medalist(s)	Mariana Belen Canillas Gomez	Central							43.88	
4	Rosa Maria Ramirez Britos	Central							37.27	
5	Daysa Yanina Candia Alvarez	Central							32.87	
6	Olga Katryna Subeldia Cabrera	Central							30.38	
7	Lilian Milena Navarro Sanchez	Central							24.93	
8	Gloria Elizabeth Fleitas	Paraguarí							23.88	
9	Herminia Almiron Fernandez	Paraguarí							23.63	
10	Leryn Dahiana Franco Steneri	Central							19.43	
11	Vanessa Benegas Fernández	Central							N/A	

== See also ==
- Sport in Paraguay
- Paraguayan Olympic Committee
- Paraguayan Athletics Federation
- Paraguayan records in athletics
- List of athletics clubs in Paraguay
