= Club Sol de América (Asunción) =

- Full name: Club Sol de América
- Nickname(s): SOL
- Ground: Asunción, Paraguay
- Manager: (Paraguay) Édgar Torres (Paraguay) Leryn Franco
- League: (Paraguay) Federación Paraguaya de Atletismo

Club Sol de América, initialed SOL, is a track and field athletics club based in the city of Asunción in Paraguay. The club is affiliated with the Federación Paraguaya de Atletismo. At national level, Sol de América is the best athletics club in Paraguay along with the Asociación de Atletismo del Alto Paraná and Paraguay Marathon Club.

== Athletes ==
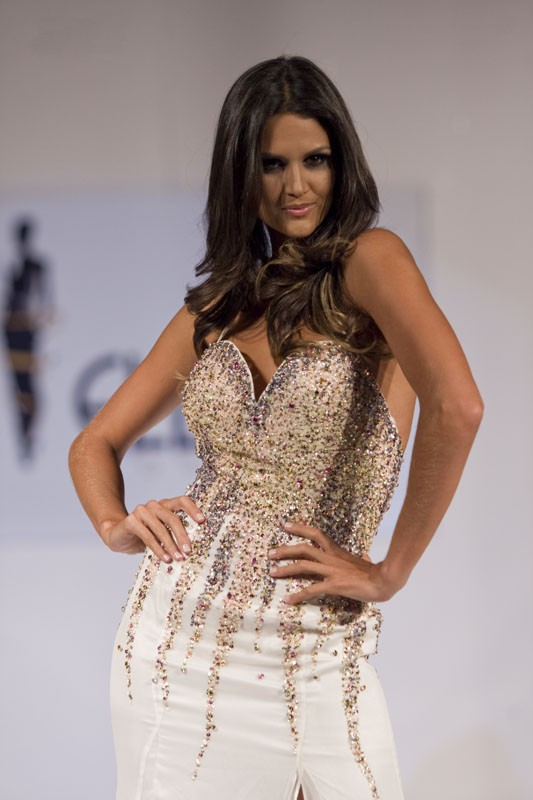
Leryn Franco is coordinator of the Athletics Department at Club Sol de América.

=== International ===
Athlete	Country	Events	Honors	Reference
Emily Sheppard	Canada	Salto Alto	Mundial Juvenil de Atletismo de 2003	
Fabian Jara	Paraguay	Lanzamiento de jabalina, 100m, Salto Largo	Sudamericano Sub-23 de Atletismo de 2012, Sudamericano Sub-23 de Atletismo de 2014, Juegos Sudamericanos de 2014	
Laura Melissa Paredes	Paraguay	Lanzamiento de jabalina	Sudamericano Juvenil de 2012, Mundial Juvenil de 2013	
Santiago Sasiaín	Paraguay	Lanzamiento de martillo	Récord nacional	

=== National ===
Athlete	Country	Events	Honors	Reference
Noelia Azucena Caceres Ortega	Paraguay	Lanzamiento de martillo	Campeonatos Nacionales	
Roger Sosa	Paraguay	200m	Campeonatos Nacionales	
Cristian David Leguizamon Riquelme	Paraguay	100m	Campeonatos Nacionales	

== See also ==
List of athletics clubs in Paraguay
