= Club Águilas del Sur =

Track and field athletics club in Paraguay

Águilas del Sur
- Full name: Club Atlético Águilas del Sur
- Ground: Santa Rosa, Paraguay
- Coach: (Japan) Jun Mizushima
- League: Federación Paraguaya de Atletismo

Club Atlético Águilas del Sur initialed CAAS is a track and field athletics club based in the city of Santa Rosa of the Misiones department in Paraguay. The club is affiliated with the Federación Paraguaya de Atletismo. Since 2015, the voluntary coach of Japanese nationality, Jun Mizushima, is working in the city of Santa Rosa on behalf of the Federación Paraguaya de Atletismo and the Secretaria Nacional de Deportes and wants to strengthen Paraguay in the disciplines of throwing hammer and discus.

== Athletes ==
=== International representatives ===
Notable athletes from the club who have been convoked to represent Paraguay at continental or world championships:

- N/A

=== National representatives ===
Notable athletes to represent the club at Paraguay's national competitions:

- (Paraguay) Armando Jesus Martinez Bogado (100m, 200m)
- (Paraguay) Gonzalo Jesus Diaz (200m, 400m)
- (Paraguay) Francisco Soto Allende (1500m)
- (Paraguay) Ivan Daniel Diaz Martinez (Shot Put Throw, Javelin Throw)
- (Paraguay) Angel Gabriel Alonzo Riveros (Javelin Throw)
- (Paraguay) Angel Alfonso Riveros Silva (Javelin Throw)

== See also ==
- List of athletics clubs in Paraguay
