= Paraguayan Athletics Championships =

The Campeonato de la Victoria or Torneo de la Victoria is Paraguay's most important national athletics competition, disputed annually since 1950. The Federación Paraguaya de Atletismo's calendar consists of several national evaluative athletics competitions disputed throughout the year and culminates with the Championship of the Victoria.

The competition is contested by athletes registered with clubs affiliated with the Federación Paraguaya de Atletismo. All competitions under the Federación Paraguaya de Atletismo take place at the Secretaria Nacional de Deportes, located in the city of Asunción.

The 2016 edition was disputed at the Olympic Stadium based at the Paraguayan Olympic Committee in the city of Luque.

== History ==
The FPA's Campeonato de la Victoria or Torneo de la Victoria is the most important national athletics competition and occurs towards the end of the calendar year. The championship forms part of the history of Paraguayan Athletics. The competition has been active since 1950.

== List of championships ==
Edition
| | Venue | Stadium | Date |
|---|---|---|---|
| 2016 | Luque | Comité Olímpico Paraguayo | September 30 – October 2 |
| 2015 | Asunción | Secretaria Nacional de Deportes | September 25–27 |
| 2014 | Asunción | Secretaria Nacional de Deportes | October 24–25 |
| 2013 | Asunción | Secretaria Nacional de Deportes | October 5–6 |
| 2012 | Asunción | Secretaria Nacional de Deportes | November 9–11 |

== See also ==
- Sport in Paraguay
- Paraguayan Olympic Committee
- Paraguayan Athletics Federation
- Paraguayan records in athletics
- List of athletics clubs in Paraguay
