= Athletics at the 2010 South American Games – Men's javelin throw =

The Men's Javelin Throw event at the 2010 South American Games was held on March 23 at 18:15.

== Medalists ==
Gold	Silver	Bronze
Víctor Fatecha; Paraguay	Lucas Ivan da Silva; Brazil	Tomás Guerra; Chile

== Records ==
Standing records prior to the 2010 South American Games
World record	Jan Železný	Czech Republic	98.48m	Jena, Germany	25 May 1996
World Leading	Guillermo Martínez	Cuba	86.38m	Havana, Cuba	26 February 2010
South American record	Edgar Baumann	Paraguay	84.70m	San Marcos, United States	17 October 1999
South American U23 record	Júlio César de Oliveira	Brazil	78.91m	Ponce, Puerto Rico	27 May 2006

== Results ==
Results were published.

=== Final ===
Rank	Athlete	Nationality	Attempt						Best Result	Notes
Rank	Athlete	Nationality	1	2	3	4	5	6	Best Result	Notes
1st place, gold medalist(s)	Víctor Fatecha	Paraguay	73.22	71.69	71.41	72.59	–	–	73.22	
2nd place, silver medalist(s)	Lucas Ivan da Silva	Brazil	59.35	65.28	65.30	60.23	58.94	62.56	65.30	
3rd place, bronze medalist(s)	Tomás Guerra	Chile	x	x	63.93	63.32	61.65	61.00	63.93	
4	Jhon Emerson Valencia	Colombia	58.53	62.18	x	62.61	60.93	x	62.61	
5	Mauricio Jaime	Argentina	57.72	60.79	57.31	x	56.79	59.88	60.79	
6	Eduardo Alexandrino	Brazil	54.28	57.87	53.61	–	56.54	60.41	60.41	
7	Cristian Hinestroza	Colombia	56.86	x	57.21	56.60	58.47	59.52	59.52	

== See also ==
- 2010 South American Under-23 Championships in Athletics
