= 2004 Paraguayan Primera División season =

- Season: 2004
- Champions: Cerro Porteño (26th title)
- Relegated: Sol de América; Sport Colombia
- Copa Libertadores: Cerro Porteño; Libertad; Tacuary
- Copa Sudamericana: Cerro Porteño; Libertad

The 2004 Paraguayan Primera División season was the top-tier football league in Paraguay, played from February 7 to December 5, 2004. Ten teams participated in the competition, which was divided into three stages: the Apertura Tournament, won by Cerro Porteño; the Clausura Tournament, also won by Cerro Porteño. As a result, Club Cerro Porteño was automatically crowned as the Absolute Champion of the 2004 season, securing their 26th title in history.

== 2004 Apertura Tournament ==
The tournament began on February 7 and ended on June 27. It was played under a round-robin tournament format, with home and away matches, totaling 18 rounds. Cerro Porteño emerged as the champion.

=== Standings ===
Pos.	Team	P	W	D	L	GF	GA	GD	Pts.
1.	Cerro Porteño	18	12	5	1	31	13	18	41
2.	Libertad	18	11	5	2	44	13	31	38
3.	Tacuary	18	8	4	6	25	13	12	28
4.	Guaraní	18	8	4	6	20	25	-5	28
5.	Olimpia	18	6	5	7	21	28	-7	23
6.	Nacional	18	4	6	8	19	25	-6	18
7.	Sol de América	18	5	4	9	14	24	-10	19
8.	12 de Octubre	18	5	3	10	18	28	-10	18
9.	Sportivo Luqueño	18	3	8	7	19	30	-11	17
10.	Sport Colombia	18	4	3	11	21	34	-13	15

Pos=Position; P=Matches played; W=Matches won; D=Matches drawn; L=Matches lost; GF=Goals for; GA=Goals against; GD=Goal difference; Pts=Points

=== Pre-Sudamericana 2004 ===
A play-off was held between the first-place team (Cerro Porteño) and the teams ranked between 2nd and 4th place (inclusive). The format consisted of two-legged matches, with the winners advancing to a final. The winner earned a spot in the 2004 Copa Sudamericana.

==== Semifinals ====
July 3, 2004

Guaraní	3–2 (1–2)	Tacuary
Pablo Giménez 10'; Pablo Giménez 76'; Kenji Fukuda 90' (pen.)		Luciano Vera 29'; Julio Ortellado 42'

Rogelio Livieres, Asunción
Referee: Pedro Melgarejo (PAR)
July 9, 2004

Tacuary	3–4 (0–3)	Guaraní
Emilio Ibarra 67'; Luciano Vera 77' (pen.); Carlos Torres 86'		Édgar González 5'; Pablo Giménez 32'; Kenji Fukuda 45+2'; Kenji Fukuda 69'

Roberto Bettega, Asunción
Referee: Nelson Valenzuela (PAR)
- Guaraní advanced to the final after defeating Tacuary with an aggregate score of 7–5.
July 4, 2004

Cerro Porteño	5–1 (4–1)	Olimpia
Julio dos Santos 10'; Jorge Achucarro 15'; César Ramírez 20'; Jorge Achucarro 24'; Jorge Achucarro 53'		Julio Enciso 40' (pen.)

Defensores del Chaco, Asunción
Attendance: 4,938
Referee: Nelson Valenzuela
July 10, 2004

Olimpia	0–1	Cerro Porteño
		Santiago Salcedo 7'

Defensores del Chaco, Asunción
Attendance: 3,724
Referee: Carlos Torres
- Cerro Porteño advanced to the final after defeating Olimpia with an aggregate score of 6–1.

==== Final ====
July 17, 2004

Guaraní	1–3 (1–0)	Cerro Porteño
Édgar González 32'		Santiago Salcedo 47'; César Ramírez 51'; Jorge Achucarro 70'

Rogelio Livieres, Asunción
August 4, 2004

Cerro Porteño	0–1	Guaraní
		Alcides Rodas 27'

General Pablo Rojas, Asunción
Attendance: 1,997
Referee: Carlos Torres (PAR)
- Cerro Porteño secured a spot in the Copa Sudamericana 2004 by defeating Guaraní with an aggregate score of 3–2.

== 2004 Clausura Tournament ==
The tournament started on August 7 and ended on December 5. The format was a round-robin system, with home and away matches, spanning 18 rounds. The winner of the tournament was Cerro Porteño.

=== Standings ===
Pos.	Teams	MP	W	D	L	GF	GA	GD	Pts.
1.	Cerro Porteño	18	12	2	4	30	13	17	38
2.	Libertad	18	9	4	5	27	22	5	31
3.	Nacional	18	7	6	5	29	24	5	27
4.	Tacuary	18	4	12	2	15	14	1	24
5.	Guaraní	18	5	8	5	21	29	-8	23
6.	Sport Colombia	18	5	6	7	22	24	-2	21
7.	Sol de América	18	5	5	8	25	27	-2	20
8.	Sportivo Luqueño	18	4	8	6	23	29	-6	20
9.	12 de Octubre	18	3	9	6	19	22	-3	18
10.	Olimpia	18	4	4	10	22	29	-7	16

Pos=Position; MP=Matches played; W=Matches won; D=Matches drawn; L=Matches lost; GF=Goals for; GA=Goals against; GD=Goal difference; Pts=Points

== Accumulated Points ==
Team	Pts	MP	W	D	L	GF	GA	GD
1 Club Cerro Porteño	79	36	24	7	5	61	26	+35
2 Club Libertad	69	36	20	9	7	71	35	+36
3 Club Tacuary	52	36	12	16	8	40	27	+13
4 Club Guaraní	51	36	13	12	11	41	54	-13
5 Club Nacional	47	36	12	11	13	48	48	0
6 Club Olimpia	39	36	10	9	17	39	51	-12
7 Club Sportivo Luqueño	37	36	7	16	13	38	52	-14
8 Club 12 de Octubre	36	36	8	12	10	37	50	-13
9 Club Sol de América	36	36	9	9	18	43	56	-13
10 Club Sport Colombia	36	36	9	9	18	43	57	-14

Pts=Points; MP=Matches Played; W=Wins; D=Draws; L=Losses; GF=Goals For; GA=Goals Against; GD=Goal Difference

Qualified for Copa Libertadores 2005
Relegated to Second Division

== Relegations and Promotions ==
- The clubs Sol de América and Sport Colombia were relegated to the Second Division after finishing in the last places in the average points table.
- The clubs 3 de Febrero and General Caballero earned promotion to the First Division for the 2005 season by becoming champions and runners-up, respectively.
