= María Lucelly Murillo =

Colombian javelin thrower

Personal information
- Full name: María Lucelly Murillo Murillo
- Born: 5 May 1991 (age 35)

Sport
- Sport: Athletics
- Event: Javelin throw

María Lucelly Murillo (born 5 May 1991) is a Colombian athlete specialising in the javelin throw. She represented her country at the 2011 World Championships without advancing for the final. She competed in the 2020 Summer Olympics.

== Personal bests ==
Event	Best (m)	Venue	Date
Javelin throw	62.72	(Hungary) Budapest	23 August 2023
Shot put	13.15	(Puerto Rico) Mayagüez	17 April 2010

Key: AR = Area record, NR = National record

== International competitions ==
Year	Competition	Venue	Position	Event	Notes
Representing Colombia
2009	South American U20 Championships	São Paulo, Brazil	4th	Shot put	12.33 m
2009	South American U20 Championships	São Paulo, Brazil	1st	Javelin throw	50.08 m
2009	Pan American U20 Championships	Port of Spain, Trinidad and Tobago	1st	Javelin throw	51.76 m
2010	South American Games / South American U23 Championships	Medellín, Colombia	1st	Javelin throw	56.08 m
2010	World U20 Championships	Moncton, Canada	4th	Javelin throw	54.44 m
2010	Central American and Caribbean Games	Mayagüez, Puerto Rico	3rd	Javelin throw	51.29 m
2011	South American Championships	Buenos Aires, Argentina	1st	Javelin throw	55.85 m
2011	World Championships	Daegu, South Korea	28th (q)	Javelin throw	52.83 m
2013	South American Championships	Cartagena, Colombia	5th	Javelin throw	54.61 m
2013	Bolivarian Games	Trujillo, Peru	2nd	Javelin throw	55.98 m
2014	South American Games	Santiago, Chile	4th	Javelin throw	55.76 m
2014	Central American and Caribbean Games	Xalapa, Mexico	5th	Javelin throw	53.06 m
2017	Bolivarian Games	Santa Marta, Colombia	3rd	Javelin throw	54.66 m
2018	South American Games	Cochabamba, Bolivia	2nd	Javelin throw	58.81 m
2018	Central American and Caribbean Games	Barranquilla, Colombia	1st	Javelin throw	59.54 m
2018	Ibero-American Championships	Trujillo, Peru	1st	Javelin throw	59.51 m
2019	South American Championships	Lima, Peru	2nd	Javelin throw	57.24 m
2019	Pan American Games	Lima, Peru	4th	Javelin throw	59.69 m
2021	South American Championships	Guayaquil, Ecuador	2nd	Javelin throw	59.92 m
2021	Olympic Games	Tokyo, Japan	28th (q)	Javelin throw	54.98 m
2023	Central American and Caribbean Games	San Salvador, El Salvador	2nd	Javelin throw	58.92 m
2023	South American Championships	São Paulo, Brazil	3rd	Javelin throw	59.75 m
2023	World Championships	Budapest, Hungary	11th	Javelin throw	54.85 m
2023	Pan American Games	Santiago, Chile	4th	Javelin throw	59.19 m
2024	Ibero-American Championships	Cuiabá, Brazil	4th	Javelin throw	57.80 m
2024	Olympic Games	Paris, France	16th (q)	Javelin throw	60.38 m
2025	South American Championships	Mar del Plata, Argentina	5th	Javelin throw	54.63 m
2026	Ibero-American Championships	Lima, Peru	4th	Javelin throw	53.96 m
