= Olga Katryna Subeldia Cabrera =

Olga Katryna Subeldia Cabrera also known as Katryna Subeldía (born 6 January 1989) is a Paraguayan former track and field athlete, known for winning a Silver Medal at the Under-23 South American Games in 2010, and for finishing 5th at the 2011 South American Championships in Argentina. She was last active in 2015.

== International Competitions ==
Year	Competition	Venue	Position	Event	Notes
2010	2010 South American Under-23 Championships	Medellín, Colombia	2nd	Javelin Throw	52.27m
2011	2011 South American Championships	Buenos Aires, Argentina	5th	Javelin Throw	50.14m

== National Competitions ==
Year	Competition	Venue	Position	Event	Notes
2013	2013 Paraguayan Athletics Championships	Asunción, Paraguay	6th	Hammer Throw	30.38m
2014	2014 Paraguayan Athletics Championships	Asunción, Paraguay	2nd	Discus Throw	36.50m
2015	Asunción Torneo William Rivalora	Asunción, Paraguay	1st	Discus Throw	38.87m

== Personal bests ==
- Discus Throw: 43.97m (Paraguay) Asunción – 5 November 2011
- Javelin Throw: 52.27m (Colombia) Medellín – 23 March 2010
