= Cristian Fatecha =

Paraguayan footballer (born 1982)

Personal information
- Full name: Cristian Fatecha
- Date of birth: 15 March 1982 (age 44)
- Place of birth: Caacupé, Paraguay
- Height: 1.83 m (6 ft 0 in)
- Position: Striker

Senior career*
Years	Team	Apps	(Gls)
2000–2002	Sportivo Luqueño	4	(0)
2003	Tacuary	1	(0)
2004–2005	Sportivo Luqueño	28	(3)
2005–2006	General Caballero ZC		
2007–2008	Tacuary	37	(4)
2008	Silvio Pettirossi	16	(2)
2008–2009	Juventud de Las Piedras	0	(0)
2009	Tacuary	17	(1)
2009–2012	12 de Octubre		

International career
2001	Paraguay U20	12	(1)
2005	Paraguay	2	(0)
- * Club domestic league appearances and goals

Cristian Fatecha (born 15 March 1982) is a Paraguayan footballer.

He is the brother of javelin thrower Víctor Fatecha.

Fatecha represented Paraguay U20, finishing in Third place at the 2001 South American U-20 Championship and Fourth place at the 2001 FIFA World Youth Championship. Fatecha went on to make two appearances at full international level during the qualifiers for the 2006 FIFA World Cup.

== Club career ==
Fatecha participated in the preliminary phase of the 2007 Copa Sudamericana, scoring against Danubio on 1 August and scoring one of Tacuary's four penalties after a 2:2 aggregate draw on 15 August.

== International career ==
Fatecha made 12 appearances for Paraguay U20, participating in both the 2001 South American U-20 Championship, and scoring one goal against Chile, and the 2001 FIFA World Youth Championship.

In 2005, Fatecha made two appearances for the Albirroja during the qualifiers for the 2006 FIFA World Cup. His first appearance came against Venezuela on 8 October in a 1−0 away victory. Fatecha was in the starting line up of the squad which featured Roque Santa Cruz and Nelson Haedo. Four days later, Fatecha made his second appearance for the Albirroja in a 1−0 home defeat against Colombia on 12 October. Fatecha played a full 90 minutes of the fixture as he was partnered in attack with Nelson Cuevas and Salvador Cabañas.
