= Víctor Fatecha =

Paraguayan javelin thrower

Personal information
- Full name: Víctor Abel Fatecha Riveros
- Nationality: Paraguay
- Born: 10 March 1988 (age 38) Concepción, Paraguay
- Height: 1.90 m (6 ft 3 in)
- Weight: 114 kg (251 lb)

Sport
- Sport: Athletics
- Event: Javelin throw
Medal record
Men's athletics
Representing Paraguay
World Youth Championships
| Bronze medal – third place | 2005 Marrakesh | Javelin throw |
South American Games
| Gold medal – first place | 2014 Santiago | Javelin throw |
South American Youth Championships
| Gold medal – first place | 2004 Guayaquil | Javelin throw |
| Bronze medal – third place | 2002 Asunción | Javelin throw |

Víctor Abel Fatecha Riveros (born 10 March 1988) is a Paraguayan athlete specializing in the javelin throw. He competed at the 2008 Olympic Games in Beijing without reaching the final.

Fatecha is tied to Paraguay Marathon Club and competes in Paraguay's national competitions under the Federación Paraguaya de Atletismo.

He belongs to a line of Paraguayan throwers, such as Ramón Jiménez Gaona (discus), Nery Kennedy (javelin) and Edgar Baumann (javelin), who all had successful careers.

In 2014 Fatecha was one of three Paraguayan throwers to reach over 70 metres, including Larson Giovanni Diaz Martinez and Fabian Jara.

Victor Fatecha is the younger brother of association footballer Cristian Fatecha.

== Clubs ==
- (Paraguay) Olimpia Asunción (2005)
- (Paraguay) Universidad Autónoma de Asunción (–2013)
- Paraguay Marathon Club (2014–)

== Coaches ==
- (Hungary) Thomas Zuddy (2004)
- (Paraguay) Claudio Zúñiga (2005)
- (Paraguay) Plinio Penzzi

== Personal bests ==
- Javelin throw: 79.03 m – (Russia) Moscow, 15 August 2013

== Seasonal bests ==
IAAF Profile

=== 700g ===
- 2003 - 65.52
- 2004 - 74.11
- 2005 - 77.21 (PB)

=== 800g ===
- 2004 - 68.25
- 2005 - 69.32
- 2006 - 76.79
- 2007 - 78.01
- 2008 - 76.55
- 2009 - 77.82
- 2010 - 76.34
- 2011 - 76.92
- 2012 - 75.15
- 2013 - 79.03 (PB)
- 2014 - 76.09
- 2015 - 77.69
- 2016 - 75.20
- 2017 - 74.57
- 2018 - 71.55

== Competition record ==
=== International competitions ===
| Year | Competition | Venue | Position | Event | Notes |
Representing Paraguay
| 2002 | South American Youth Championships | Asunción, Paraguay | 8th | Shot put (5 kg) | 12.45 m |
| 2002 | South American Youth Championships | Asunción, Paraguay | 9th | Discus throw (1.5 kg) | 38.09 m |
| 2002 | South American Youth Championships | Asunción, Paraguay | 3rd | Javelin throw (700 g) | 59.91 m |
| 2003 | World Youth Championships | Sherbrooke, Canada | 13th (q) | Javelin throw (700 g) | 65.07 m |
| 2004 | World Junior Championships | Grosseto, Italy | 20th (q) | Javelin throw | 64.45 m |
| 2004 | South American Youth Championships | Guayaquil, Ecuador | 4th | Shot put (5 kg) | 16.11 m |
| 2004 | South American Youth Championships | Guayaquil, Ecuador | 7th | Discus throw (1.5 kg) | 45.32 m |
| 2004 | South American Youth Championships | Guayaquil, Ecuador | 1st | Javelin throw (700 g) | 70.69 m |
| 2005 | World Youth Championships | Marrakesh, Morocco | 3rd | Javelin throw (700 g) | 77.21 m |
| 2005 | Pan American Junior Championships | Windsor, Canada | 3rd | Javelin throw | 67.00 m |
| 2005 | South American Junior Championships | Rosario, Argentina | 9th | Discus throw (1.75 kg) | 44.26 m |
| 2005 | South American Junior Championships | Rosario, Argentina | 2nd | Javelin throw | 67.31 m |
| 2006 | World Junior Championships | Beijing, China | 4th | Javelin throw | 75.64 m |
| 2006 | South American Championships | Tunja, Colombia | 2nd | Javelin throw | 76.79 m |
| 2006 | South American U23 Championships | Buenos Aires, Argentina | 1st | Javelin throw | 75.45 m |
| 2007 | South American Championships | São Paulo, Brazil | 2nd | Javelin throw | 75.95 m |
| 2007 | South American Junior Championships | São Paulo, Brazil | 1st | Javelin throw | 73.07 m |
| 2007 | Pan American Junior Championships | São Paulo, Brazil | 1st | Javelin throw | 75.43 m |
| 2007 | Pan American Games | Rio de Janeiro, Brazil | 4th | Javelin throw | 72.30 m |
| 2007 | World Championships | Osaka, Japan | 29th (q) | Javelin throw | 73.55 m |
| 2008 | Ibero-American Championships | Iquique, Chile | 3rd | Javelin throw | 75.81 m |
| 2008 | Olympic Games | Beijing, China | 30th (q) | Javelin throw | 71.58 m |
| 2008 | South American U23 Championships | Lima, Peru | 2nd | Javelin throw | 69.69 m |
| 2009 | South American Championships | Lima, Peru | 6th | Javelin throw | 67.59 m |
| 2009 | Universiade | Belgrade, Serbia | 19th (q) | Javelin throw | 69.86 m |
| 2009 | World Championships | Berlin, Germany | 41st (q) | Javelin throw | 68.65 m |
| 2010 | South American U23 Championships South American Games | Medellín, Colombia | 1st | Javelin throw | 73.22 m |
| 2010 | Ibero-American Championships | San Fernando, Spain | 2nd | Javelin throw | 76.34 m |
| 2011 | South American Championships | Buenos Aires, Argentina | 3rd | Javelin throw | 72.51 m |
| 2011 | ALBA Games | Barquisimeto, Venezuela | 2nd | Javelin throw | 71.85 m |
| 2011 | Pan American Games | Guadalajara, Mexico | 5th | Javelin throw | 76.92 m |
| 2012 | Ibero-American Championships | Barquisimeto, Venezuela | 4th | Javelin throw | 75.15 m |
| 2013 | South American Championships | Cartagena, Colombia | 1st | Javelin throw | 76.14 m |
| 2013 | World Championships | Moscow, Russia | 18th (q) | Javelin throw | 79.03 m |
| 2013 | Bolivarian Games | Trujillo, Peru | 1st | Javelin throw | 74.49 m |
| 2014 | South American Games | Santiago, Chile | 1st | Javelin throw | 76.09 m |
| 2014 | Ibero-American Championships | São Paulo, Brazil | 3rd | Javelin throw | 74.73 m |
| 2014 | Pan American Sports Festival | Mexico City, Mexico | 6th | Javelin throw | 75.68 m A |
| 2015 | South American Championships | Lima, Peru | 6th | Javelin throw | 68.72 m |
| 2015 | Pan American Games | Toronto, Canada | 10th | Javelin throw | 73.81 m |
| 2016 | Ibero-American Championships | Rio de Janeiro, Brazil | 5th | Javelin throw | 73.78 m |
| 2017 | South American Championships | Luque, Paraguay | 3rd | Javelin throw | 74.57 m |
| 2017 | Bolivarian Games | Santa Marta, Colombia | 5th | Javelin throw | 69.82 m |
| 2018 | South American Games | Cochabamba, Bolivia | 7th | Javelin throw | 65.37 m |

=== National Competitions ===
| Year | Competition | Venue | Position | Event | Notes |
|---|---|---|---|---|---|
| 2003 | FPA Open Tournament | Asunción, Paraguay | 2nd | Javelin | 65.52m |
| 2018 | Torneo Sajonia de 2018 | Asunción, Paraguay | 1st | Javelin | 71.55m |

Olympic Games
| Preceded by Rocio Rivarola | Flagbearer for Paraguay; Beijing 2008 | Succeeded by Benjamin Hockin |
