= 2003 South American Cross Country Championships =

- Organisers: CONSUDATLE
- Edition: 18th
- Date: February 22–23
- Host city: Asunción, Paraguay
- Venue: Circuito de Ñu Guazú
- Events: 8
- Distances: 12 km – Senior men 4 km – Men's short 8 km – Junior men (U20); 4 km – Youth men (U18); 8 km – Senior women 4 km – Women's short 6 km – Junior women (U20); 3 km – Youth women (U18)
- Participation: 95 athletes from 8 nations

The 2003 South American Cross Country Championships took place on February 22–23, 2003. The races were held at the Circuito de Ñu Guazú in Asunción, Paraguay.

Complete results, results for junior and youth competitions, and medal winners were published.

== Medallists ==
Event	Gold		Silver		Bronze	
Individual
Senior men (12 km)	Javier Alexander Guarín; Colombia	39:34	Jonathan Monje; Chile	39:55	Roberto Echeverría; Chile	40:00
Men's short (4 km)	Clodoaldo Gomes da Silva; Brazil	12:12	Fabián Romaszczuk; Argentina	12:19	Jonathan Monje; Chile	12:22
Junior (U20) men (8 km)	José Luis Romero; Argentina	27:53	Jhon Cusi (Peru) Perú	27:53	Guido Benedetti; Argentina	28:01
Youth (U18) men (4 km)	John Tello; Colombia	13:17	Pablo Mena; Chile	13:17	Víctor Gelvez; Argentina	13:30
Senior women (8 km)	Susana Rebolledo; Chile	31:13	Luz Silva; Chile	31:25	Érika Olivera; Chile	31:32
Women's short (4 km)	Valeria Rodríguez; Argentina	14:16	Susana Rebolledo; Chile	14:27	Luz Silva; Chile	14:28
Junior (U20) women (6 km)	Ruby Riativa; Colombia	22:56	Edna Kaline de Oliveira Santos; Brazil	23:31	María Soledad del Carlo; Argentina	23:48
Youth (U18) women (3 km)	Carolina González; Colombia	11:36	Rocío Cantará (Peru) Perú	11:39	Beatriz Quispe; Bolivia	11:50
Team
Senior men	Chile	10	Argentina	21	Paraguay	33
Men's short	Chile	12	Argentina	17	Paraguay	30
Junior (U20) men	Argentina	11	Paraguay	31		
Youth (U18) men	Argentina	12	Paraguay	28		
Senior women	Chile	6	Argentina	18	Paraguay	30
Women's short	Chile	9	Argentina	14	Paraguay	31
Junior (U20) women	Argentina	12	Paraguay	24		
Youth (U18) women	Argentina	24	Paraguay	32		

== Race results ==
=== Senior men's race (12 km) ===
Individual race
Rank	Athlete	Country	Time
1st place, gold medalist(s)	Javier Alexander Guarín	Colombia	39:34
2nd place, silver medalist(s)	Jonathan Monje	Chile	39:55
3rd place, bronze medalist(s)	Roberto Echeverría	Chile	40:00
4	Rolando Pillco	Bolivia	40:19
5	Carlos Jaramillo	Chile	40:20
6	César Troncoso	Argentina	41:09
7	Juan San Martín	Argentina	41:29
8	José Luis Luna	Argentina	42:35
9	Enício Pereira Maximiano	Brazil	44:09
10	Víctor López	Argentina	44:38
11	Plinio Penzzi	Paraguay	45:41
12	Leonardo Malgor	Argentina	45:47
13	Eladio Fernández	Paraguay	46:42
14	Freddy Villamayor	Paraguay	48:08
—	Sergio López	Chile	DNF
—	Oscar Fernández	Uruguay	DNF

Teams
Rank	Team	Points
1st place, gold medalist(s)	Chile: Jonathan Monje / 2; Roberto Echeverría / 3; Carlos Jaramillo / 5; (Sergio López) / (DNF)	10
2nd place, silver medalist(s)	Argentina: César Troncoso / 6; Juan San Martín / 7; José Luis Luna / 8; (Víctor López) / (n/s); (Leonardo Malgorn) / (n/s)	21
3rd place, bronze medalist(s)	Paraguay: Plinio Penzzi / 10; Eladio Fernández / 11; Freddy Villamayor / 12	33

- Note: Athletes in parentheses did not score for the team result. (n/s: nonscorer)

=== Men's short race (4 km) ===
Individual race
Rank	Athlete	Country	Time
1st place, gold medalist(s)	Clodoaldo Gomes da Silva	Brazil	12:12
2nd place, silver medalist(s)	Fabián Romaszczuk	Argentina	12:19
3rd place, bronze medalist(s)	Jonathan Monje	Chile	12:22
4	Roberto Echeverría	Chile	12:28
5	Carlos Jaramillo	Chile	12:33
6	Oscar Fernández	Uruguay	12:57
7	Ulises Sanguinetti	Argentina	12:58
8	Sergio López	Chile	13:05
9	Darío Hernán Nuñez	Argentina	13:08
10	Mariano Tarilo	Argentina	13:18
11	Gustavo Romero	Argentina	13:29
12	Mariano Mastromarino	Argentina	13:50
13	Freddy Villamayor	Paraguay	13:59
14	Valentino Valdovinos	Paraguay	14:15
15	Roberto Domínguez	Paraguay	14:41

Teams
Rank	Team	Points
1st place, gold medalist(s)	Chile: Jonathan Monje / 3; Roberto Echeverría / 4; Carlos Jaramillo / 5; (Sergio López) / (n/s)	12
2nd place, silver medalist(s)	Argentina: Fabián Romaszczuk / 2; Ulises Sanguinetti / 7; Darío Hernán Nuñez / 8; (Mariano Tarilo) / (n/s); (Gustavo Romero) / (n/s); (Mariano Mastromarino) / (n/s)	17
3rd place, bronze medalist(s)	Paraguay: Freddy Villamayor / 9; Valentino Valdovinos / 10; Roberto Domínguez / 11	30

- Note: Athletes in parentheses did not score for the team result. (n/s: nonscorer)

=== Junior (U20) men's race (8 km) ===
Individual race
Rank	Athlete	Country	Time
1st place, gold medalist(s)	José Luis Romero	Argentina	27:53
2nd place, silver medalist(s)	Jhon Cusi	(Peru) Perú	27:53
3rd place, bronze medalist(s)	Guido Benedetti	Argentina	28:01
4	Diego Moreno	(Peru) Perú	28:17
5	Hugo Díaz	Chile	28:22
6	Jefferson Douglas de Castro	Brazil	28:26
7	Matías Carranza	Argentina	29:02
8	José San Martín	Argentina	29:04
9	Gustavo López	Paraguay	29:06
10	Daniel Ballen	Colombia	30:03
11	Walter Viera	Uruguay	30:05
12	Valentino Valdovinos	Paraguay	31:02
13	Roberto Domínguez	Paraguay	32:00
—	Santiago Figueroa	Argentina	DNF

Teams
Rank
Team
Points

Argentina

José Luis Romero	1
Guido Benedetti	3
Matías Carranza	7
(José San Martín)	(n/s)
(Santiago Figueroa)	(DNF)

11

Paraguay

Gustavo López	8
Valentino Valdovinos	11
Roberto Domínguez	12

31

- Note: Athletes in parentheses did not score for the team result. (n/s: nonscorer)

=== Youth (U18) men's race (4 km) ===
Individual race
Rank	Athlete	Country	Time
1st place, gold medalist(s)	John Tello	Colombia	13:17
2nd place, silver medalist(s)	Pablo Mena	Chile	13:17
3rd place, bronze medalist(s)	Víctor Gelvez	Argentina	13:30
4	Diego Maurelli	Argentina	13:32
5	Luis Chaparro	Argentina	13:33
6	Rodrigo Trinidad	Paraguay	13:41
7	Andrés Silva	Uruguay	13:44
8	Agustín Bernardaz	Argentina	13:45
9	Freddy Espinosa	Colombia	14:03
10	Sidnei da Cunha	Brazil	14:43
11	Carlos López	Paraguay	15:08
12	Jonathan Velásquez	Paraguay	15:14

Teams
Rank
Team
Points

Argentina

Víctor Gelvez	3
Diego Maurelli	4
Luis Chaparro	5
(Agustín Bernardaz)	(n/s)

12

Paraguay

Rodrigo Trinidad	6
Carlos López	10
Jonathan Velásquez	11

28

- Note: Athletes in parentheses did not score for the team result. (n/s: nonscorer)

=== Senior women's race (8 km) ===
Individual race
Rank	Athlete	Country	Time
1st place, gold medalist(s)	Susana Rebolledo	Chile	31:13
2nd place, silver medalist(s)	Luz Silva	Chile	31:25
3rd place, bronze medalist(s)	Érika Olivera	Chile	31:32
4	Yolanda Fernández	Colombia	31:54
5	Jimena Labraña	Chile	32:20
6	Carina Allay	Argentina	32:56
7	Noemí Garay	Argentina	33:24
8	Mercedes Romero	Argentina	33:35
9	Marcela Greco	Argentina	33:50
10	María Clara Serino	Argentina	33:59
11	Ninfa Chávez	Paraguay	34:38
12	Silvia Amodio	Uruguay	35:09
13	Edith Benítez	Paraguay	36:26
14	Erica da Silva Camargo	Brazil	37:22
15	Rossana Coronel	Paraguay	39:16
—	Susy Acosta	Paraguay	DNF

Teams
Rank	Team	Points
1st place, gold medalist(s)	Chile: Susana Rebolledo / 1; Luz Silva / 2; Érika Olivera / 3; (Jimena Labraña) / (n/s)	6
2nd place, silver medalist(s)	Argentina: Carina Allay / 5; Noemí Garay / 6; Mercedes Romero / 7; (Marcela Greco) / (n/s); (María Clara Serino) / (n/s)	18
3rd place, bronze medalist(s)	Paraguay: Ninfa Chávez / 8; Edith Benítez / 10; Rossana Coronel / 12; (Susy Acosta) / (DNF)	30

- Note: Athletes in parentheses did not score for the team result. (n/s: nonscorer)

=== Women's short race (4 km) ===
Individual race
Rank	Athlete	Country	Time
1st place, gold medalist(s)	Valeria Rodríguez	Argentina	14:16
2nd place, silver medalist(s)	Susana Rebolledo	Chile	14:27
3rd place, bronze medalist(s)	Luz Silva	Chile	14:28
4	Érika Olivera	Chile	14:56
5	Elizabeth Esteves de Souza	Brazil	14:59
6	María de los Ángeles Peralta	Argentina	15:08
7	Rosa Godoy	Argentina	15:15
8	Jimena Labraña	Chile	15:17
9	Ninfa Chávez	Paraguay	15:46
10	Evangelina Zamarini	Argentina	17:39
11	Edith Benítez	Paraguay	17:43
12	Rosana Coronel	Paraguay	17:51
13	Lorena Galán	Argentina	17:57
14	Susy Acosta	Paraguay	19:12

Teams
Rank	Team	Points
1st place, gold medalist(s)	Chile: Susana Rebolledo / 2; Luz Silva / 3; Érika Olivera / 4; (Jimena Labraña) / (n/s)	9
2nd place, silver medalist(s)	Argentina: Valeria Rodríguez / 1; María de los Ángeles Peralta / 6; Rosa Godoy / 7; (Evangelina Zamarini) / (n/s); (Lorena Galán) / (n/s)	14
3rd place, bronze medalist(s)	Paraguay: Ninfa Chávez / 8; Edith Benítez / 9; Rosana Coronel / 10; (Susy Acosta) / (n/s)	31

- Note: Athletes in parentheses did not score for the team result. (n/s: nonscorer)

=== Junior (U20) women's race (6 km) ===
Individual race
Rank	Athlete	Country	Time
1st place, gold medalist(s)	Ruby Riativa	Colombia	2:56
2nd place, silver medalist(s)	Edna Kaline de Oliveira Santos	Brazil	23:31
3rd place, bronze medalist(s)	María Soledad del Carlo	Argentina	23:48
4	Natalia Siviero	Argentina	24:15
5	Ximena Fernández	Argentina	24:24
6	Eliana Vázquez	Chile	25:42
7	Viviana Freitas	Paraguay	27:35
8	Leticia Fleitas	Paraguay	29:33
9	Lucy Lezcano	Paraguay	30:20
—	Nadia Rodríguez	Argentina	DNF
—	Beatriz Quispe	Bolivia	DNF

Teams
Rank
Team
Points

Argentina

María Soledad del Carlo	3
Natalia Siviero	4
Ximena Fernández	5
(Nadia Rodríguez)	(DNF)

12

Paraguay

Viviana Freitas	7
Leticia Fleitas	8
Lucy Lezcano	9

24

- Note: Athletes in parentheses did not score for the team result. (n/s: nonscorer)

=== Youth (U18) women's race (3 km) ===
Individual race
Rank	Athlete	Country	Time
1st place, gold medalist(s)	Carolina González	Colombia	11:36
2nd place, silver medalist(s)	Rocío Cantará	(Peru) Perú	11:39
3rd place, bronze medalist(s)	Beatriz Quispe	Bolivia	11:50
4	Militza Saucedo	Bolivia	11:51
5	Ingrid Galloso	Chile	12:08
6	Andrea Latapie	Argentina	12:15
7	Maristela Aparecida da Cunha	Brazil	12:17
8	María Emilia Galante	Argentina	12:28
9	Dora Rotela	Paraguay	13:04
10	Valeria Henzel	Argentina	13:10
11	Nora Morinigo	Paraguay	13:12
12	Romina Erices	Argentina	13:21
13	Jessica Muñoz	Paraguay	13:59

Teams
Rank
Team
Points

Argentina

Andrea Latapie	6
María Emilia Galante	8
Valeria Henzel	10
(Romina Erices)	(n/s)

24

Paraguay

Dora Rotela	9
Nora Morinigo	11
Jessica Muñoz	12

32

- Note: Athletes in parentheses did not score for the team result. (n/s: nonscorer)

== Medal table (unofficial) ==
* Host nation (Paraguay)

Rank	Nation	Gold	Silver	Bronze	Total
1	Argentina	6	5	3	14
2	Chile	5	4	4	13
3	Colombia	4	0	0	4
4	Brazil	1	1	0	2
5	Paraguay*	0	4	4	8
6	Peru	0	2	0	2
7	Bolivia	0	0	1	1
Totals (7 entries)		16	16	12	44

- Note: Totals include both individual and team medals, with medals in the team competition counting as one medal.

== Participation ==
According to an unofficial count, 95 athletes from 8 countries participated.

- Argentina (38)
- Bolivia (3)
- Brazil (8)
- Chile (12)
- Colombia (7)
- Paraguay (20)
- (Peru) Perú (3)
- Uruguay (4)

== See also ==
- 2003 in athletics (track and field)
