= Giovanni Díaz =

Paraguayan javelin thrower

Giovanni Diaz
Personal information
- Full name: Larson Giovanni Diaz Martinez
- Born: 23 March 1994 (age 32) Santa Rosa, Misiones, Paraguay

Sport
- Country: Paraguay
- Sport: Athletics
- Rank: 140th (IAAF)
- Event: Men's javelin throw
- Club: Paraguay Marathon Club
Medal record
Men's athletics
Representing Paraguay
South American Junior Championships in Athletics
Silver medal – second place	2013 Resistencia	Javelin throw
- Updated on 5 January 2016

Larson Giovanni Diaz Martinez (born 23 March 1994 in Santa Rosa, Misiones Department, Paraguay) is a Paraguayan javelin thrower. He has a scholarship with the Secretaria Nacional de Deportes and represents Paraguay Marathon Club in the Federación Paraguaya de Atletismo. Díaz claimed a silver medal at the 2013 South American Junior Championships in Athletics.

Larson Giovanni Diaz Martinez and María Caballero were the best athletes of the 2015 Paraguayan Athletics Championships.

He belongs to a line of Paraguayan throwers, such as Ramón Jiménez Gaona (discus), Víctor Fatecha (javelin), Nery Kennedy (javelin) and Edgar Baumann (javelin), who all had successful careers.

== Career ==
At the age of 16 years old, Díaz begins athletics for Athletics School of Misiones and begins to take the sport seriously when he realizes that he can make the correct result to qualify for the South American Championships in Javelin Throw, and receives support from the FPA and the SND. Despite having pain in the leg, he did not give up.

=== 2013 ===
In 2013, Díaz claimed a silver medal at the 2013 South American Junior Championships in Athletics, throwing a distance of 62.25 m.

=== 2014 ===
In 2014, Díaz was one of three Paraguayan throwers to reach over 70 metres, including Víctor Fatecha and Fabian Jara.

=== 2015 ===
At the 2015 National Senior Championships, he finished 2nd with 72.40m in Javelin and achieved the result for the Pan American Games in Canada.

Díaz represented Paraguay at the 2015 South American Championships in Athletics disputed in Lima in June 2015. Díaz finished in fifth position having thrown 70.52 metres, surpassing compatriot and 2008 Summer Olympics Paraguay representative Victor Fatecha.

On 25 September 2015, Díaz was crowned champion of the Federación Paraguaya de Atletismo National Men's Javelin competition disputed at the Secretaria Nacional de Deportes. Díaz surpassed Victor Fatecha by throwing 75.57 metres.

The mark of 75.57 metres was registered by IAAF as the athlete's personal best.

Díaz concluded the 2015 IAAF season being ranked 140th in the world.

=== 2016 ===
In 2016, he states that his objective is to be one of the best Paraguayan athletes.

=== 2018 ===
Díaz achieves qualification to the 2018 Juegos Odesur by throwing 69.53m in April.

== Personal bests ==
- Javelin throw: 75.57m – (Paraguay) Secretaria Nacional de Deportes, Asunción, 25 September 2015

== Seasonal bests ==
IAAF Profile and Federación Paraguaya de Atletismo

- 2013 - 62.25m
- 2014 - 70.50m
- 2015 - 75.57m
- 2016 - 74.04m
- 2017 - 72.99m
- 2018 - 69.53m

== Personal life ==
Since the scholarship, he lives at the residence of the Paraguayan Olympic Committee ubicated in the city of Luque.
