= Athletics at the 2010 South American Games – Women's javelin throw =

The women's javelin throw event at the 2010 South American Games was held on March 23 at 17:00.

== Medalists ==
Gold	Silver	Bronze
María Lucelly Murillo; Colombia	Katryna Subeldía; Paraguay	Rafaela Gonçalves; Brazil

== Records ==
Standing records prior to the 2010 South American Games
World record	Barbora Špotáková	Czech Republic	72.28m	Stuttgart, Germany	13 September 2008
World Leading	Mariya Abakumova	Russia	68.31m	Adler, Russia	25 February 2010
South American record	Sabina Moya	Colombia	62.62m	Guatemala City, Guatemala	12 May 2002
South American U23 record	Sabina Moya	Colombia	58.81m	Bogotá, Colombia	25 June 1999

== Results ==
Results were published.

=== Final ===
Rank	Athlete	Nationality	Attempt						Best Result	Notes
Rank	Athlete	Nationality	1	2	3	4	5	6	Best Result	Notes
1st place, gold medalist(s)	María Lucelly Murillo	Colombia	x	56.08	51.81	50.87	x	–	56.08	
2nd place, silver medalist(s)	Katryna Subeldía	Paraguay	47.41	49.36	52.27	49.29	50.43	x	52.27	
3rd place, bronze medalist(s)	Rafaela Gonçalves	Brazil	48.15	50.11	46.28	41.46	47.64	x	50.11	
4	Flor Ruiz	Colombia	48.65	49.08	x	x	x	x	49.08	
5	María Paz Ríos	Chile	39.25	43.14	44.11	x	41.60	x	44.11	
6	Madelaine Santa Cruz	Ecuador	32.95	33.87	35.59	–	–	–	35.59	

== See also ==
- 2010 South American Under-23 Championships in Athletics
