= Christopher Ortiz =

Paraguayan athletics competitor

Christopher Ortiz (born Christopher Josué Ortiz González on 2 August 1995 in Coronel Oviedo, Caaguazú, Paraguay) is a Paraguayan sprinter and high jumper and is a national record holder. He belongs to the Paraguay Marathon Club. In 2018, he achieved two national records in 300 metres hurdles and 150 metres hurdles. In April 2018, he achieved his best result in the 100 metre sprint of 10.47 seconds.

== Trayectory ==
On 24–25 October 2014, He finished first in the High Jump event at the 2014 edition of the Paraguayan Athletics Championships with a mark of 1.66 m. His gold medal at the competition was one of several achieved by athletes of the Paraguay Marathon Club, respectively.

Selected for Paraguay to represent at the 2016 Ibero-American Championships in Athletics, coached by Plinio Penzzi.
