= Paraguay Marathon Club =

- Full name: Paraguay Marathon Club
- Ground: Asunción, Paraguay
- Chairman: (Paraguay) Myrta Doldán
- League: (Paraguay) Federación Paraguaya de Atletismo

Paraguay Marathon Club (initialed PMC) is a track and field athletics club based in the city of Asunción in Paraguay. The club is affiliated with the Federación Paraguaya de Atletismo. The current president of the Paraguay Marathon Club is Myrta Doldán, who is also president of the Federación Paraguaya de Atletismo. At national level, Paraguay Marathon Club is the best athletics club in Paraguay along with Club Sol de América and the Asociación de Atletismo del Alto Paraná.

== History ==
Paraguay Marathon Club was champion of the 2014 Paraguayan Athletics Championships upon reaching 345 points.

Paraguay Marathon Club was crowned champion of the 2015 Paraguayan Athletics Championships, where it achieved a score of 139.

== Athletes ==
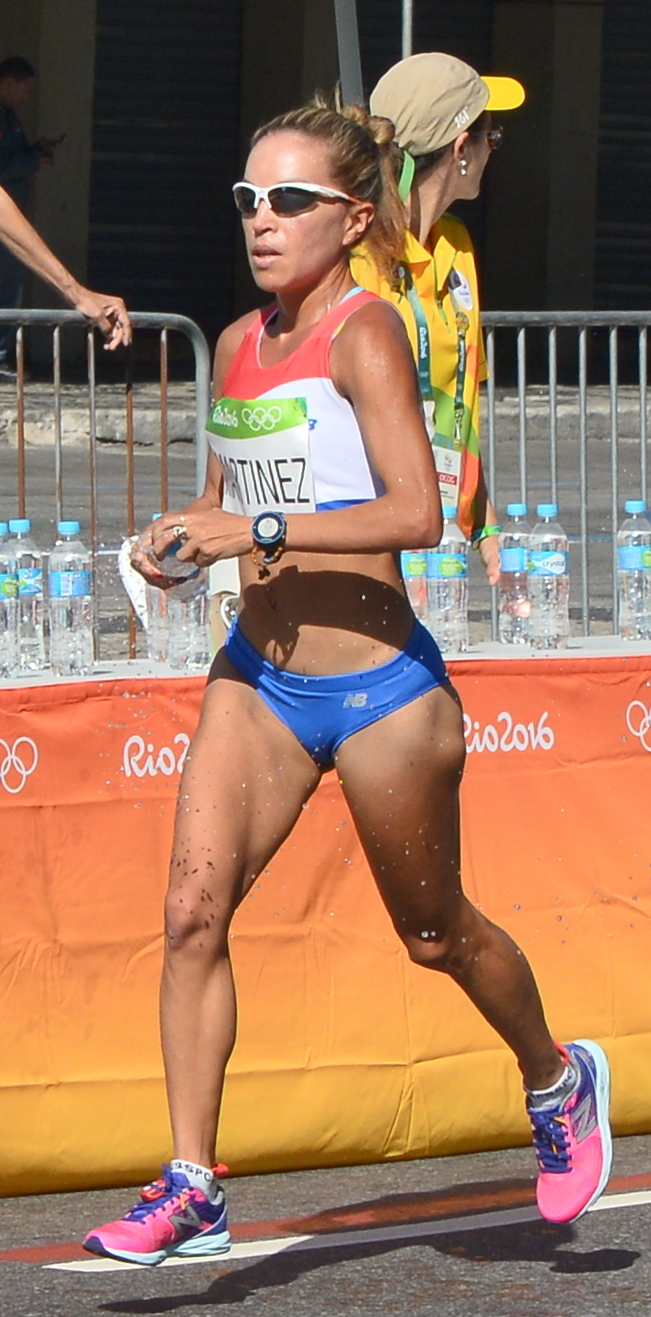
Carmen Martínez, PMC athlete, competed at the 2016 Summer Olympics.

=== International ===
Athlete	Country	Events	Honors	Reference
Carmen Martínez	Paraguay	5, 000 metres	2016 Summer Olympics	
Anna Camila Pirelli	Paraguay	100m, Long Jump, High Jump	2015 World Championships in Athletics and Paraguayan record for Heptathlon	
Victor Fatecha	Paraguay	Javelin throw	2008 Summer Olympics	
Fredy Maidana	Paraguay	100m, 200m	Paraguayan record for 100m and 200m	
Larson Giovanni Diaz Martinez	Paraguay	Javelin throw	2015 South American Championships	
Derlis Ramón Ayala	Paraguay	10000 km	2016 Summer Olympics and national record for 10 km	
Christopher Josue Ortiz Gonzalez	Paraguay	100m, High Jump	2016 Ibero-American Championships in Athletics	

=== National ===
Athlete	Country	Events	Honors	Reference
John William Zavala Zalimben	Paraguay	200 metre sprint	National Championships	

== See also ==
- List of athletics clubs in Paraguay
- List of Paraguayan records in athletics
