= Fabian Jara =

Paraguayan javelin thrower (born 1993)

Édgar Fabian Jara Dohmann (born 8 January 1993) is a Paraguayan javelin thrower. He represented the University of Texas in the US and also Sol de América in Paraguay. Jara was coached by Olympic Athlete Claudio Escauriza and Santiago Pérez up to his arrival at the University of Texas in 2014, when he started training under American former javelin thrower, Ty Sevin .

== Education ==
Jara attended High School at Colegio Goethe in Paraguay, where he received a distinguished student award all four years of high school. He was later a student at the University of Texas at Austin, graduating with a degree in Economics and a minor in Statistics in May 2017. He earned a Masters of Science in Finance degree from the McCombs School of Business in May 2018.

== Personal life ==
Jara is the son of Edgar Jara and Erica Dohmann. He has two siblings, Gaspar Jara and Gustavo Jara. Jara can also speak in Spanish, German, Portuguese and Paraguayan Guaraní.

== Trajectory ==
=== 2010 ===
In 2010, coached by Chilean Claudio Zúñiga, won the first Pan-American Games in Juiz de Fora, Brazil by throwing a PR of 61,10m. In te same year, he competed at the pre-olympics youth games in Uberlandia, Brazil and at the South-American Youth Championship una Santiago, Chile.

=== 2011 ===
With only 18 years old, Jara was the second youngest participant at the South-American Adult Championship in Buenos Aires, Argentina, where he-advanced to the finals and was the only javelin thrower to achieve a PR at the meet.

=== 2012 ===
Jara competed at the 2012 South American Under-23 Championships. The only Paraguayan thrower in the event, he reached a maximum mark of 65.72 metres and concluded in 6th position, while Argentine Braian Toledo finished in 1st place with a throw of 78.49 metres.

=== 2013 ===
At the 2013 Paraguayan Athletics Championships, Jara threw 63.45 metres, second behind Víctor Fatecha who reached 74 metres. He also achieved 6.22 metres in Long Jump.

=== 2014 ===
In 2014, Jara was one of three Paraguayan throwers to reach over 70 metres, including Víctor Fatecha and Larson Giovanni Diaz Martinez.

Athletics at the 2014 South American Games in March, 6th placed Jara threw a seasonal best of 72.35 metres, four metres less than 1st place, which was achieved by compatriot Víctor Fatecha who threw 76.09 metres.

He competed for Texas for the first time at the Big 12 Championship, where he won and threw his life time PR of 74.25m.

At the 2014 South American Under-23 Championships in October, Jara achieved 68.78 metres, winning the Bronce Medal. Throwing just over two metres more than compatriot Larson Díaz.

=== 2015 ===
In 2015, he won the Texas Relays and was the first Longhorn to win the Javelin after 20 years.

Jara appeared at the Sol de América Tournament in Asunción, the tournament hosted by his club of the same name.

2016

A severe injury prevented Jara from competing in the 2016 season.

2017

On his last year at the University of Texas, Jara was ranked as high as 1st in the NCAA Div I. He won his second title at the Big 12 Championship and earned All-American Status by placing 7th at the National Championship.

== Competitions ==
=== International competitions ===
Year	Competition	Venue	Position	Event	Notes
Representing Paraguay
2012	2012 South American Under-23 Championships	São Paulo, Brazil	6th	Javelin Throw	65.72m
2014	2014 South American Games	Santiago, Chile	6th	Javelin Throw	72.35m
2014	2014 South American Under-23 Championships	Montevideo, Uruguay	3rd	Javelin Throw	68.78m

=== National competitions ===
Year	Competition	Venue	Position	Event	Notes
2013	2013 Paraguayan Athletics Championships	Asunción, Paraguay	8th	High Jump	1.50
2013	2013 Paraguayan Athletics Championships	Asunción, Paraguay	2nd	Long Jump	6.22 m
2013	2013 Paraguayan Athletics Championships	Asunción, Paraguay	2nd	Triple Jump	12.53 m
2013/14	Big 12 Conference Championships	United States of America	1st	Javelin Throw	N/A
2013/14	NCAA Men's Outdoor Track and Field West Preliminary Rounds	United States of America	5th	Javelin Throw	N/A
2013/14	NCAA Men's Outdoor Track and Field Championship	United States of America	18th	Javelin Throw	N/A
2013	2013 Paraguayan Athletics Championships	Asunción, Paraguay	2nd	Javelin Throw	63.45 m
2014/15	NCAA Men's Outdoor Track and Field West Preliminary Rounds	United States of America	20th	Javelin Throw	N/A
2014/15	Big 12 Conference Championships	United States of America	3rd	Javelin Throw	68.77m
2014/15	Michael Johnson Classic	United States of America	2nd	Javelin Throw	66.63m
2014/15	Texas Invitational Tournament	Texas, United States of America	1st	Javelin Throw	64.50m
2014/15	Nike Clyde Littlefield Texas Relays	Texas, United States of America	1st	Javelin Throw	70.86m
2015	2015 Sol de América Cup	Asunción, Paraguay	6th	100 metres	12.51 s
2015	2015 Sol de América Cup	Asunción, Paraguay	1st	100 metres relay	45.07 s
2015	2015 Sol de América Cup	Asunción, Paraguay	3rd	Long Jump	6.08 m
2016/17	Texas Invitational Tournament	Texas, United States of America	1st	Javelin Throw	69.90m
2016/17	NCAA Men's Outdoor Track and Field West Preliminary Rounds	United States of America	18th	Javelin Throw	N/A
2016/17	Big 12 Conference Championships	United States of America	2nd	Javelin Throw	69.32m

== Seasonal bests ==
- 2013 - 71.25 m
- 2014 - 74.25 m (PB)

== Personal best ==
- Javelin Throw: 74.25 m (United States) Lubbock – 16 May 2014
