= Edgar Baumann =

Paraguayan field athlete (born 1970)

Edgar Baumann (full name: Edgar Andres Baumann Dure; born 16 April 1970 in San Lorenzo, Paraguay) is a former Paraguayan javelin thrower and current javelin coach, sports promoter, and businessperson. He is of German descent.

Baumann won a silver medal at the 1995 Pan American Games in Mar del Plata, Argentina, setting a South American record at the time with a throw of 78.7 m (258 ft) and thereby surpassing Colombian Luis Lucumi's throw of 77.80 metres in 1989. He went on to hold the South American javelin record four times and was the first South American javelin thrower to throw over 80 metres.

Baumann qualified for the 1992 Barcelona Olympics but did not compete. He competed at the Olympic Games for the first time in Atlanta in 1996, throwing a maximum distance of 77.74 metres. His later extending of the South American record to 84.70 metres qualified him for the 2000 Sydney Olympics, but due to a controversy involving the Paraguayan Olympic Committee he did not participate.

As a result Baumann sued the Paraguayan Olympic Committee in 2000 in a lawsuit that lasted nine years. He received support from Paraguayan football figure José Luís Chilavert in the process, who condemned corruption in Paraguayan sport. The case culminated with the Paraguayan Supreme Court ruling in favor of Baumann and awarding him a minimum of US$1 million in damages.

== Education ==
Baumann attended Texas State University and was a member of the athletics team Texas State Bobcats.

== Career ==
=== 1995 ===
On 21 March 1995 Baumann threw 78.70m at the 1995 Pan American Games in Mar del Plata, Argentina. He won a silver medal – the only Paraguayan to achieve a medal in the athletics competition – coming second to Cuban thrower Emeterio González who threw 79.28 m. His result was a new South American record, surpassing Colombian thrower Luis Lucumi's previous record throw of 77.80m which was set in 1989. Baumann mentioned the lack of support and the directors of his time as obstacles that he faced in setting the record, commenting that, "It is difficult to make such an important mark in South America, more being Paraguayan. It is extremely difficult because of adversities."

In the same year he threw 72.90m at the World Championships in Sweden, with Cuba's Emeterio González reaching 76.54m.

=== 1996 ===
Baumann was one of eight track and field athletes at Texas State University who nearly qualified to compete at the 1996 Olympics.

=== 1999 ===
On 17 October 1999 Baumann threw 84.70m during a competition in San Marcos, Texas, thereby breaking the South American record for a fourth time and overtaking then-current record holder and Paraguayan compatriot Nery Kennedy's throw of 81.28m, which had held the record since 1998. With this throw Baumann reached an IAAF ranking of sixth in the world and qualified for the 2000 Summer Olympic Games in Sydney, Australia. However, one day before the Paraguay Olympic team was scheduled to leave for Sydney Baumann became sick and was hospitalised for five days. He did not travel to Sydney and the Paraguayan Olympic Committee sent Nery Kennedy in his place, who later recalled that he was called up for the Olympics "at the last minute". Kennedy had not been ranked within the IAAF top 50 in 1999 or 2000, the ranking necessary in order to qualify for the Olympics.

== Controversy ==
Baumann and tennis player Rossana de los Ríos were expelled from the Paraguayan Olympic team for Sydney, as was confirmed by the president of the Paraguayan Olympic Committee, Ramón Zubizarreta. Zubizarreta said this was because a doping test of Baumann had shown positive results for cocaine and amphetamines. This resulted in Baumann suing the Paraguayan Olympic Committee for US$2 million in damages. Baumann denied doping, saying the supposed doping tests in question were declared "false and irrelevant" in the following trial. He also denounced an alleged poisoning attempt, saying that the then-president of the Paraguayan Athletics Federation, Francisco Rojas Soto, allegedly gave him contaminated water to drink during an athletics meeting after which Baumann felt unwell. He added that he did not lose consciousness on the track but left on his own to request toxicology tests at a hospital.

However, the controversy deprived Baumann of his right to participate at the Sydney Olympics, with his replacement Nery Kennedy finishing in 33rd place with a maximum throw of 70.26 m, well under the qualification mark of 83.00 metres.

Paraguayan football goalkeeper and former national captain José Luis Chilavert backed Baumann and condemned the actions of Zubizarreta, saying he should be expelled from the Olympic Committee for harming athletes and their careers as well as for refusing to give them benefits. Along with Claudio Escauriza, Tomás Orué, and lawyer Alejandro Rubin, Chilavert attended a press conference at the Shopping del Sol in Assunción – the main mall in the country – in support of Baumann, and he also brought a lawsuit against Zubizarreta.

The incident was resolved after nine years of judicial proceedings, with Baumann receiving a favorable ruling from the Paraguay Supreme Court for being stripped of the right to compete at the 2000 Summer Olympics and for having funds earned from his scholarship taken unlawfully. The court awarded him a minimum of US$1 million in damages.

Zubizarreta was investigated again in 2015 and had charges filed against him for the misappropriation of funds. In 2016 the mayor of San Bernardino, Paraguay filed a report claiming there was a shortage of 3.840 million Paraguayan guaraníes from the administration of his predecessor Zubizarreta.

In November 2016 Cronica newspaper reported that Baumann's house had been shot at.

== Coaching and sports promotion ==
In 2013 Baumann coached Paraguayan junior athlete Fabian Jara.

On 27 September 2016 ADN Newspaper reported that Baumann presented a project to Itaipú Dam to form an organisation of athletes and citizen leaders in Paraguay. Baumann said of the project:

"The goal of the proposed plan is to discover the potential that each child and young person has and to strengthen them in what they do well, always using sports as the foundation. Of course, we hope to discover talents for athletics. We want to take children out of the streets and the dangers of violence and drug addiction."

In November 2016 he helped the Asociación de Atletismo del Alto Paraná athletics club host a national athletics competition of the Paraguayan Athletics Federation in Ciudad del Este, where Baumann was a resident.

== Competitions ==
=== International competitions ===
Year	Competition	Venue	Position	Notes
Representing Paraguay
1989	South American Junior Championships	Montevideo, Uruguay	4th	58.62 m
1989	Pan American Junior Championships	Santa Fe, Argentina	4th	59.18 m
1990	South American Games	Lima, Peru	2nd	64.40 m
1991	Pan American Games	Havana, Cuba	10th	65.26 m
1992	Ibero-American Championships	Seville, Spain	7th	66.70 m
1993	World Championships	Stuttgart, Germany	45th (q)	59.82 m
1994	South American Games	Valencia, Venezuela	3rd	70.78 m
1995	Pan American Games	Mar del Plata, Argentina	2nd	78.70 m
1995	World Championships	Gothenburg, Sweden	28th (q)	72.90 m
1996	Ibero-American Championships	Medellín, Colombia	3rd	73.94 m
1996	Olympic Games	Atlanta, United States of America	18th (q)	77.74 m
1997	South American Championships	Mar del Plata, Argentina	4th	72.18 m
1997	World Championships	Athens, Greece	13th (q)	72.96 m
1998	Ibero-American Championships	Lisbon, Portugal	4th	68.55 m
1999	Pan American Games	Winnipeg, Canada	4th	71.40 m

=== National competitions ===
Year	Competition	Venue	Position	Notes
1993	SouthLand Conference Championship	Texas, United States of America	1st	72.36 m
1994	SouthLand Conference Championship	Texas, United States of America	1st	73.66 m

== Personal best ==
- Javelin Throw: 84.70m (United States) San Marcos – 17 October 1999

== Seasonal bests ==
- 1988 - 55.30
- 1989 - 64.68
- 1990 - 68.26
- 1991 - 69.98
- 1992 - 72.90
- 1993 - 74.76
- 1994 - 75.96
- 1995 - 78.70
- 1996 - 80.56
- 1997 - 76.44
- 1998 - 79.22
- 1999 - 84.70 (AR)

== See also ==
- List of South American records in athletics
- List of Paraguayan records in athletics
