= Leryn Franco =

Paraguayan model, actress and athlete

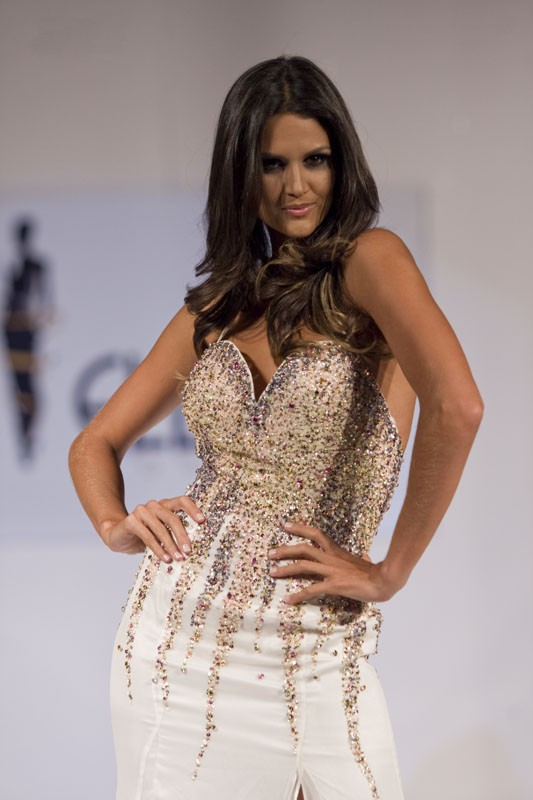
- Leryn Franco in 2009

Personal information
- Born: Leryn Dahiana Franco Steneri; 1 March 1982 (age 44) Asunción, Paraguay
- Height: 1.72 m (5 ft 7 1/2 in)
- Weight: 54 kg (119 lb; 8.5 st)
- Website: www.lerynfranco.com.py

Sport
- Country: Paraguay
- Sport: Athletics
- Event: Javelin throw
- Retired: 2014

Achievements and titles
- Olympic finals: 2004 Summer Olympics: 42nd 2008 Summer Olympics: 51st 2012 Summer Olympics: 34th
- Personal best: 57.77 metres
Medal record
Women's Athletics
Representing Paraguay
South American Junior Championships
Bronze medal – third place	1999 Concepción	Javelin throw
South American Youth Championships
Gold medal – first place	1998 Manaus	Javelin throw
- Updated on 1 July 2013

Leryn Dahiana Franco Steneri (born 1 March 1982 in Asunción) is a Paraguayan model, actress and former athlete who currently works for the athletics department of Club Sol de América. Franco participated at the 2004, 2008 and 2012 Olympics competing in the javelin throw.

On 8 June 2012, Franco achieved a personal best throw of 57.77 m in Barquisimeto, Venezuela at the 2012 Ibero-American Championships in Athletics. Her achievement also became the new national record, having surpassed the previous record of 55.66 m, which Franco threw at the 2011 South American Championships in Athletics.

In 2013, she was cast in Irish film Eliza Lynch: Queen of Paraguay, portraying the role of the younger Eliza Lynch.

== Athletics ==
On 3 September 2002, she broke her own javelin throw record reaching 51 metres in an international tournament contested in São Caetano, Brasil.

== Modeling and beauty pageants ==
Franco appeared in the 2011 Sports Illustrated Swimsuit Issue. She has competed in several beauty pageants. In 2006, she was runner-up Miss Universo Paraguay 2006. She participated in the Miss Bikini of the Universe pageant. Franco has her own calendar, which was photographed in 2007 by Martin Crespo.

== Personal life ==
Franco's parents were born in Uruguay and she is a fan of Olimpia in Paraguay and Peñarol in Uruguay. Franco played football before pursuing javelin. She is also a graduate in Business Administration.

== Acting career ==
In 2013, Franco was cast for the role of Younger Eliza Lynch in the film which was filmed in Paraguay, Argentina, Brazil, France, England and Ireland. Film Ireland described how Franco "beautifully captures the spirit of a young Eliza Lynch".

=== Film ===
Year	Show	Role	Notes
2013	(Republic of Ireland) Eliza Lynch: Queen of Paraguay	Younger Eliza Lynch	

== Personal bests ==
- Javelin throw: 57.77 m NR – (Venezuela) Barquisimeto, 8 June 2012

== Competition record ==
=== International competitions ===
Year	Competition	Venue	Position	Event	Notes
Representing Paraguay
1996	South American Youth Championships	Asunción, Paraguay	8th	4 × 100 m relay	53.89 s
1996	South American Youth Championships	Asunción, Paraguay	11th	Long jump	4.60 m
1996	South American Youth Championships	Asunción, Paraguay	8th	Pentathlon	2236 pts
1997	South American Junior Championships	San Carlos, Uruguay	7th (h)	200 m	28.61 s (wind: +1.1 m/s)
1997	South American Junior Championships	San Carlos, Uruguay	7th (h)	400 m	66.89 s
1997	South American Junior Championships	San Carlos, Uruguay	7th	4 × 100 m relay	55.08 s
1998	South American Junior Championships	Córdoba, Argentina	8th	Triple jump	11.03 m
1998	South American Junior Championships	Córdoba, Argentina	6th	Javelin throw	39.35 m
1998	South American Youth Championships	Manaus, Brazil	5th	Triple jump	10.68 m
1998	South American Youth Championships	Manaus, Brazil	1st	Javelin throw	40.26 m
1998	South American Youth Championships	Manaus, Brazil	6th	Pentathlon	2602 pts
1999	World Youth Championships	Bydgoszcz, Poland	7th (q)	Javelin throw	43.56 m
1999	South American Junior Championships	Concepción, Chile	3rd	Javelin throw	42.26 m
2000	Ibero-American Championships	Rio de Janeiro, Brazil	6th	Javelin throw	45.08 m
2000	South American Junior Championships	São Leopoldo, Brazil	3rd	Javelin throw	46.50 m
2001	Universiade	Beijing, China	10th	Javelin throw	43.69 m
2001	South American Junior Championships	Santa Fe, Argentina	11th	Long jump	5.06 m
2001	South American Junior Championships	Santa Fe, Argentina	1st	Javelin throw	43.69 m
2001	Pan American Junior Championships	Santa Fe, Argentina	2nd	Javelin throw	47.28 m
2003	South American Championships	Barquisimeto, Venezuela	7th	Javelin throw	45.06 m
2003	Pan American Games	Santo Domingo, Dom. Rep.	8th	Javelin throw	50.21 m
2003	World Championships	Paris, France	24th (q)	Javelin throw	51.13 m
2004	South American U23 Championships	Barquisimeto, Venezuela	1st	Javelin throw	51.53 m
2004	Ibero-American Championships	Huelva, Spain	7th	Javelin throw	50.00 m
2004	Olympic Games	Athens, Greece	42nd (q)	Javelin throw	50.37 m
2007	South American Championships	São Paulo, Brazil	3rd	Javelin throw	53.80 m
2007	Pan American Games	Rio de Janeiro, Brazil	8th	Javelin throw	52.24 m
2007	Universiade	Bangkok, Thailand	10th	Javelin throw	52.24 m
2008	Olympic Games	Beijing, China	51st (q)	Javelin throw	45.34 m
2009	Universiade	Belgrade, Serbia	14th (q)	Javelin throw	48.26 m
2011	South American Championships	Buenos Aires, Argentina	2nd	Javelin throw	55.66 m (NR)
2011	ALBA Games	Barquisimeto, Venezuela	2nd	Javelin throw	56.17 m
2011	Pan American Games	Guadalajara, Mexico	13th	Javelin throw	48.70 m
2012	Ibero-American Championships	Barquisimeto, Venezuela	2nd	Javelin throw	57.77 m (NR)
2012	Olympic Games	London, United Kingdom	34th (q)	Javelin throw	51.45 m
2013	South American Championships	Cartagena, Colombia	4th	Javelin throw	54.79 m
2014	South American Games	Santiago, Chile	5th	Javelin throw	52.86 m

=== National championships ===
Year	Competition	Venue	Position	Event	Notes
2013	Paraguayan Athletics Championships	Asunción, Paraguay	1st	Javelin throw	50.51m
2014	Paraguayan Athletics Championships	Asunción, Paraguay	1st	Javelin throw	45.95m

== Seasonal bests ==
IAAF Profile

- 1999 - 43.56
- 2000 - 46.50
- 2001 - 47.28
- 2002 - 51.81
- 2003 - 53.09
- 2004 - 54.68
- 2005 - 49.78
- 2007 - 55.38
- 2008 - 53.34
- 2010 - 50.98
- 2011 - 55.66
- 2012 - 57.77 (NR)
- 2013 - 55.68
- 2014 - 52.86
