= Sport in Paraguay =

Sport in Paraguay is an important part of national culture. Association football is the most popular sport, while basketball is also very popular. Other sports such as padel, volleyball, futsal, swimming and tennis are popular as well. Other Paraguayan sports and pastimes are rugby union, chess, motorsport, golf and rowing.

== Football ==
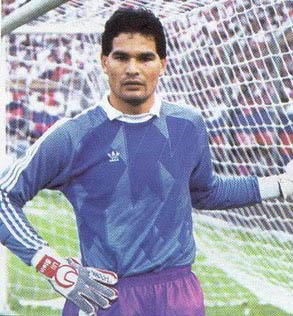
Paraguay's biggest star, José Luís Chilavert was chosen by the IFFHS as the best goalkeeper in the world on three occasions as 1995, 1997 and 1998 and figures amongst 48 legendary players by the IFFHS

Football, also known as Futbol, is by far the most popular sport in Paraguay to the point that it is part of the nation's culture. Football was first introduced in Paraguay by Dutchman William Paats, who moved from the Netherlands to Asunción in 1888. In 1900, small tournaments were held at the Plaza de Armas, a plaza located in downtown Asunción. By 1906 the number of football clubs in Paraguay had increased and the Paraguayan Football Association, the governing body of football in Paraguay, was founded. The Paraguayan Football Association joined CONMEBOL in 1921, and FIFA in 1925. Football has grown enormously since then, and there are over 1600 teams spread throughout Paraguay participating in multiple leagues. Each of those teams try to make their way to the first division by clearing the different levels of lower divisions. The growth and evolution of Paraguayan football can be seen in the achievements made in the club level and by the Paraguay national football team. The national team has participated in eight World Cups, won two Copa América tournaments, and earned a silver medal at the Olympic Games in 2004. All these accomplishments established Paraguay as the fourth most successful football nation in South America behind Argentina, Brazil and Uruguay. At the club level, Olimpia Asunción has won a total of eight international tournaments, including three Copa Libertadores and one Intercontinental Cup. Among the most important and successful football players in Paraguayan history are Arsenio Erico, Aurelio González, Romerito and José Luis Chilavert. In 2016, Roque Santa Cruz was regarded as one of the best players in the nation's history.

== Basketball ==
Basketball in Paraguay dates back to 1936, when no governing body existed, and the sport was governed by the Paraguayan Sports Association. The Paraguayan Basketball Federation (PBF, Confederación Paraguaya de Basket) was formed as the governing body in 1947, the same year it joined the International Basketball Federation (FIBA). The PBF organizes both the National League (for teams outside of Asunción) and the Metropolitan League (for teams from Asunción), and runs the Paraguay national basketball team. The best achievements by the national team were their two second-place finishes in the South American Basketball Championship in 1955 and 1960.

== Athletics ==
Athletics in Paraguay is managed by the Federación Paraguaya de Atletismo. The sport is mainly practiced in the throwing modalities.

== Golf ==
Carlos Franco won four PGA Tour tournaments, and was the 1999 PGA Tour Rookie of the Year after finishing sixth at the 1999 Masters Tournament. Fabrizio Zanotti has won two European Tour tournaments, and earned the gold medal at the 2019 Pan American Games. Julieta Granada and Celeste Troche won the Women's World Cup of Golf in 2007. Granada has also claimed one win and six runner-up finishes at the LPGA Tour, and finished fifth at the 2014 Women's British Open.

== Handball ==
The Confederación Paraguaya de Handból is located at the Secretaria Nacional de Deportes. Paraguay's national handball team prepares at the same venue. Several clubs practice at the venue and dispute their national championship games there. In 2018, Paraguay's male and female national teams showed highlighted performances, winning the IHF Trophy for under-18 and under-20 championships. In the same year, the Paraguay under-24 team achieved silver medal in the Campeonato de Naciones Emergentes del Sur y Centroamérica, disputed in Palmira. Paraguay's under-14 and under-16 teams also participated in the Torneo Sudamericano de Hándbol cadetes disputed in Mendoza, where the first achieved bronze medal and the second achieved gold medal after defeating Brazil, who were undefeated until that moment. Olimpia Asunción, the Universidad Autónoma de Asunción and Cerro Porteño have handball teams. In October 2021, the Campeonato Centro Sur de Handball was held for female national teams at the Olympic Park at the Paraguayan Olympic Committee. Paraguay's team qualified for the 2021 World Handball Championship in Spain.

== Tennis ==
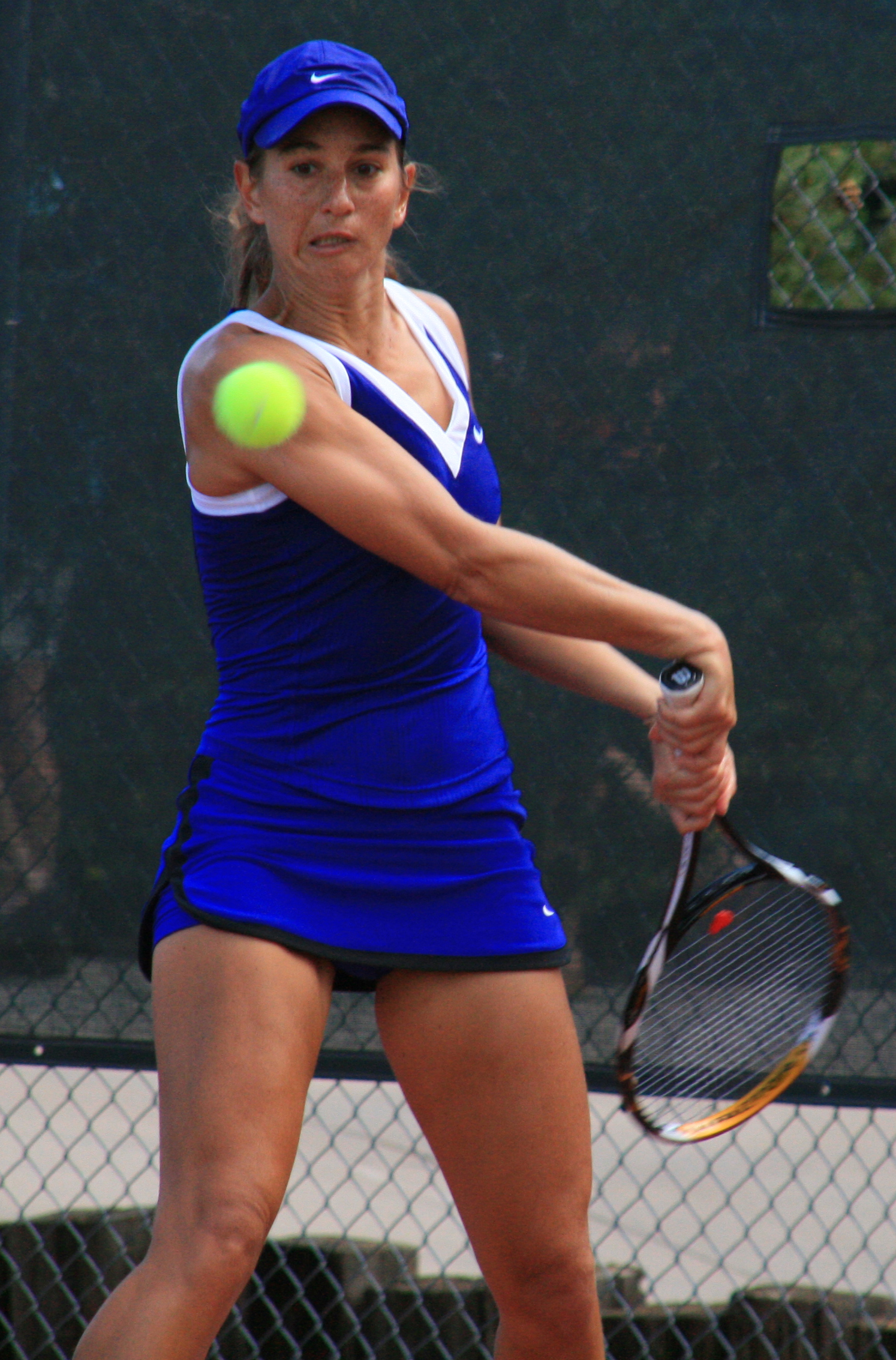
Rossana de los Ríos was the world junior number 1 in 1992

Tennis is also a significant sport in Paraguay. The Paraguay Davis Cup team competed in its first Davis Cup in 1931, and their best result was reaching the quarterfinals in 1983–85 and again in 1987. The Paraguay Fed Cup team competed in its first Fed Cup in 1991, and their best result was qualifying for the World Group play-offs in 1995. Notable male tennis players from Paraguay include males Victor Caballero, Hugo Chapacú, Ramón Delgado, Francisco González and Víctor Pecci, and female tennis players Rossana de los Ríos, Verónica Cepede Royg and Montserrat González.

== Volleyball ==
Volleyball is also a noteworthy sport in Paraguay. The men's national team won a silver medal in the South American Men's Volleyball Championship in 1958, and two bronze medals, in 1956 and 1979. The women's national team won a silver medal at the 1964 South American Volleyball Championship, and a bronze medal in the 1967 edition.

Paraguay featured a women's national team in beach volleyball that competed at the 2018–2020 CSV Beach Volleyball Continental Cup.

== Other sports ==
Padel, chess, futsal, motorsport, and rowing are also notable Paraguayan sports and pastimes.

== Bibliography ==
- Bath, Richard (ed.) The Complete Book of Rugby (Seven Oaks Ltd, 1997 ISBN 1-86200-013-1)
- Thau, Chris The South American Scene in Starmer-Smith, Nigel & Robertson, Ian (eds) The Whitbread Rugby World '89 (Lennard Books, 1988 ISBN 1-85291-038-0)
