= List of athletics clubs in Paraguay =

This is a list of athletics clubs in Paraguay. It includes only clubs that compete at track and field and that are affiliated to the Federación Paraguaya de Atletismo, the governing body for athletics in Paraguay.

== List of clubs ==
=== Capital District/Central Department ===
- Club Sol de América (SOL) – Asunción
- Paraguay Marathon Club (PMC) – Asunción
- Pingui Athletic Club (PAC) – Asunción
- Universidad Autónoma de Asunción (UAA) – Asunción
- Unix Track Club (UTC) – Asunción
- Athletic Club Jorge Cabrera (ACJC)
- Olimpia Asunción (OLI)
- Club Deportivo del Puerto Sajonia (CDPS)
- Asociacion Paraguaya de Atletismo Master (ASOPAMA)
- Olimpiadas Especiales del Paraguay (OEP)
- Eladio Fernandez Running Club (EFRC)

=== Alto Paraná Department ===
- Asociación de Atletismo del Alto Paraná (AAAP) – Ciudad del Este

=== Guairá Department ===
- Villarrica Running Club (VRC) – Villarrica

=== Itapúa Department ===
- Asociacion de Atletismo de Itapúa (AAI) – Encarnación
- Miranda Ñandú Club – Capitán Miranda
- Bella Vista Running Club – Bella Vista
- Club de Atletismo de Encarnación – Encarnación

=== Misiones Department ===
- Club Atlético Águilas del Sur 15 de Mayo (CAAS) – Santa Rosa
- Asociación Misionera de Atletismo (AMA)

=== Paraguarí Department ===
- Club Atlético de Paraguarí (CAP) – Paraguarí

== See also ==
- Sport in Paraguay
- Paraguayan Olympic Committee
- Paraguayan Athletics Federation
- Paraguayan records in athletics
- Paraguayan Athletics Championships
