= Secretaría Nacional de Deportes =

Sports venue in Asunción, Paraguay

The National Secretary of Sports initialed SND and known as Secretaría Nacional de Deportes in Spanish, is the national sports complex of Paraguay where sportspeople trained and national and international competitions are disputed. SND is the headquarters of the Federación Paraguaya de Atletismo and its track and field stadium is the venue of monthly National Athletics Evaluative Tournaments.

== Location ==
The venue is located on the Avenue Eusebio Ayala in the capital city Asunción.

== Stadium ==
In 2012, the Olympic Stadium itself endured a reparation but is not certificated by the IAAF in order to officially declare records.

== Arena ==
The SND Arena, an indoor multi-use sport and event venue with a capacity of 5,500 seats is located within the SND complex. It's used mainly for sports events, such as basketball, handball, futsal, volleyball, skating, gymnastics, among others; and also for music concerts.

== Venue ==
SND houses the scholars and holds an athletic track and field stadium, gymnasium, tennis courts, indoor arenas and other training fields.

== See also ==
- Sport in Paraguay
- Paraguayan Olympic Committee
- Paraguayan Athletics Federation
- Paraguayan records in athletics
- List of athletics clubs in Paraguay
