= Fredy Maidana =

Paraguayan sprinter

Fredy Abel Maidana Pedrozo (born 1994) is a Paraguayan sprinter and holds the List of Paraguayan records in athletics for 100m and 200m in Paraguay.

== Career ==
During the second national athletics evaluative competition of 2015, Maidana ran the 100m in 10.76s.
