= Paraguayan Athletics Federation =

Governing body for athletics in Paraguay

- Federación Paraguaya de Atletismo
- Sport: Athletics
- Jurisdiction: Federation
- Abbreviation: FPA
- Founded: December 12, 1947
- Affiliation: IAAF
- Regional affiliation: CONSUDATLE
- Headquarters: Secretaria Nacional de Deportes, Asunción
- President: Myrta Doldán
- Vice president: John Zavala
- Secretary: Amílcar Noguera

Official website
- www.fpa.org.py
- (Paraguay)

The Paraguayan Athletics Federation (Spanish: Federación Paraguaya de Atletismo, FPA) is the governing body for the sport of athletics in Paraguay.

It is located at the Secretaria Nacional de Deportes in Asunción, where it hosts its annual national competitions at its athletics stadium.

== History ==
Former logo

FPA was founded on December 12, 1947. First president was Abdur-Rahman Rana.

Former hurdler Francisco Rojas Soto headed the federation for almost twenty years until 2013. Current president is Myrta Doldán.

== Affiliations ==
FPA is the national member federation for Paraguay in the following international organisations:

- World Athletics
- Confederación Sudamericana de Atletismo (CONSUDATLE; South American Athletics Confederation)
- Association of Panamerican Athletics (APA)
- Asociación Iberoamericana de Atletismo (AIA; Ibero-American Athletics Association)

Moreover, it is part of the following national organisations:

- Paraguayan Olympic Committee (Spanish: Comité Olímpico Paraguayo)

== National records ==
FPA maintains the Paraguayan records in athletics.

== Annual competitions ==
- National Cross Country Championship
- Criollo Tournament
- Grand Prix Evaluative Open Tournament
- Paraguay Marathon Club (PMC) Tournament
- Club Atlético de Paraguarí (CAP) Tournament
- Asociación Misionera de Atletismo (AMA) Tournament
- Sajonia Tournament
- Club Atlético Ñandú (CAÑ) Tournament
- Villarrica Running Club (VRC) Tournament
- Asociación de Atletismo del Alto Paraná (AAAP) Tournament
- Club de Atletismo de Encarnación (CAE) Tournament
- Major Interclubs
- Sol de América Tournament (SOL)
- Unix Track Club (UTC) Tournament
- Eladio Fernández Running Club (EFRC) Tournament
- Club Atlético Águilas del Sur 15 de Mayo (CAAS) Tournament
- National Senior Championship
- Family Championship
- Evaluative of Minors
- Victory Championship
- Asociación Paraguaya de Atletismo Master (ASOPAMA) Tournament

== Affiliated clubs ==
List of athletics clubs in Paraguay
