= Asociación de Atletismo del Alto Paraná =

Track and field athletics club in Paraguay

- Full name: Asociación de Atletismo del Alto Paraná
- Nickname: AAAP
- Ground: Ciudad del Este, Paraguay
- League: (Paraguay) Federación Paraguaya de Atletismo

Asociación de Atletismo del Alto Paraná (initialed AAAP) is a track and field athletics club based in the city of Ciudad del Este in Paraguay. The club is affiliated with the Federación Paraguaya de Atletismo. The majority of the club's participations and achievements are for Marathon and Long distance running. The AAAP also organizes many marathon events within Ciudad del Este and Hernandarias, and also competes in marathons in neighbor city Foz de Iguazu in Brazil. At national level, the Asociación de Atletismo del Alto Paraná is the best athletics club in Paraguay along with Club Sol de América and Paraguay Marathon Club.

== History ==
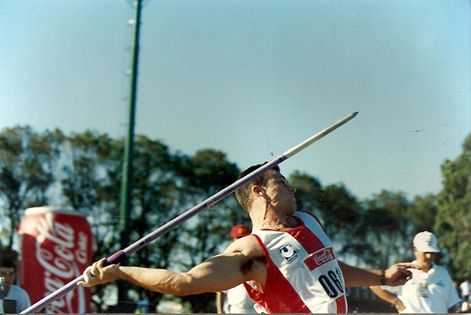
Ex javelin thrower and South American record holder Edgar Baumann assisted in the organization of the Torneo AAAP, a national athletics championship of the Paraguayan Athletics Federation, organized by the AAAP in November 2016.

2016 demonstrated to be a successful year for athletes of the AAAP. Marathon runner Pedro Garay represented the country in two encounters: the 2016 South American Marathon Championships and the 2016 South American Half Marathon Championships.

In the Peace of the Chaco Cup, disputed in Paraguarí, Garay also finished in first place of the 5000 meters event with a marc of 17.32.9 whilst Arturo Abel Aguilar Oviedo achieved first position in the events of 800 meters and 400 meters, respectively.

In the third round of the Competition of the Family the AAAP was champion in the mayor category of masculine with 231 points, very far a head of Villarrica Running Club (VRC) with 94 points, Club de Atletismo de Carapeguá (CAC) 91 points and Club of Athletics of Paraguarí (CAP) with 75 points. Also, the general champion of the Competition of the Family was the AAAP with 254 points.

In 2016, the AAAP was the host of a national athletics championship of the Paraguayan Athletics Federation, disputed in November 2016. In the organization of the competition, the AAAP received support from ex javelin thrower and South American record holder Edgar Baumann, who is a resident of Ciudad del Este, the same city that the AAAP finds itself in.

=== International ===
Athlete	Country	Events	Honors	Reference
Pedro Wilfrido Garay Penayo	Paraguay	3000m, 5000m, 10,000m	2014 South American Cross Country Championships, 1st Position of a 2015 National Marathon in Asunción, 2017 South American Championships in Athletics	
Raúl Benítez	Paraguay	5000m	2014 South American Cross Country Championships and National Record in 2013.	
Ramón Aranda	Paraguay	10,000m	1996, 1998, 1999 and 2001 South American Cross Country Championships. Also National Champion in past decades	
Enrique David Zalimben Gimenez	Argentina	Long distance	AAAP representative at Foz de Iguazu International Competition and Corrida Internacional Hernandarias	
José Francisco Bordon	Paraguay	1500m	Paraguay U20 representative at 2008 South American Cross Country Championships	

=== National ===
Athlete	Country	Events	Honors	Reference
Jesus Riveros	Paraguay	3000m	National Championships and Corrida Internacional Hernandarias	
Victor Gustavo Fleitas Vega	Paraguay	3000m, 5000m	National Championships and Corrida Internacional Hernandarias	
William Aveiro	Paraguay	5000m	National Championships	
Arturo Abel Aguilar Oviedo	Paraguay	5000m, 1500m	National Championships and 1st Position 2015 National Cross Country Championships (25–29 years)	
Manuel Princigalli Pico	Paraguay	400m	National Championships	

== Honours ==
- 2016 – General Champion of the Competition of the Family Inter Club with 254 points.
- 2015 National Cross Country Championships: 2nd Place

== See also ==
List of athletics clubs in Paraguay
