= Pedro Wilfrido Garay Penayo =

Paraguayan long-distance runner

Pedro Garay
Personal information
- Full name: Pedro Wilfrido Garay Penayo
- Born: 20 May 1982 (age 44) Minga Guazú, Paraguay

Sport
- Country: Paraguay
- Sport: Long distance
- Events: 3000m 5000m 10000m
- League: Federación Paraguaya de Atletismo
- Club: Asociación de Atletismo del Alto Paraná

Achievements and titles
- National finals: 2nd (2015)

Pedro Garay (born 20 May 1982) is a Paraguayan long-distance runner from Minga Guazú in Alto Paraná.

He is tied to Ciudad del Este based track and field club Asociación de Atletismo del Alto Paraná and has been crowned champion several times of National Marathons.

Garay represented Paraguay at the 2014 South American Cross Country Championships, as well as the 2016 South American Half Marathon Championships and the 2016 South American Marathon Championships.

== Career ==
=== 2013 ===
In October 2013, Garay finished in first position of the Fourth Annual Friends of the Road Race of Brazil, in the 5 km event.

=== 2014 ===
In September 2014, Garay finished in fifth position of The Third International Run of the ABC Color Newspaper, fulfilling 10 km in 33m 01s. In November 2014, Garay participated in the first edition of the International Run of Ciudad del Este, organized by one of the commercial attractions Shopping Zuni, a shopping centre. On 23 February 2014, Garay represented Paraguay at the 2014 South American Cross Country Championships. Individually, Garay finished in 21st position with a time of 41:55.08 in the Senior men's race of 12 km.

=== 2015 ===
In January 2015, Garay obtained fifth position in the 2015 Cross Country National Championships running 12k in 44.36.44. In May 2015, Garay finished in first position of an international competition, Media Marathon disputed in Asunción, fulfilling 5 km in 16min 26 sec in front of the Argentine Pablo Arguello who fulfilled 16m.27s. The competition was supported by the Embassy of South Korea, The National Secretary of Sport, the Paraguay Marathon Club and the Olympic Committee of Paraguay. In August 2015, Garay was crowned champion of the Suply Run, a 5 km National Marathon disputed in the city of Asunción, completing 5 km in 15 minutes and 41 seconds. In October 2015, Garay finished in first position of a district Marathon disputed in Hernandarias in Alto Paraná. During 2015, Garay participated in monthly National Evaluative Tournaments of the Federación Paraguaya de Atletismo.

=== 2016 ===
In 2016, concludes the Paraguayan National Cross Country Championships in third position with a time of 00:35:42.51.

== Competition record ==
=== International competitions ===
Year	Competition	Venue	Position	Event	Notes
Representing Paraguay
2014	2014 South American Cross Country Championships	Asunción, Paraguay	21st	12 km	41:55.08
2016	2016 South American Marathon Championships	Paraguay	8th	-	1.12.39.40
2016	2016 South American Half Marathon Championships	Asunción, Paraguay	10th	21k	01.12.39
2017	South American Championships	Luque, Paraguay	9th	3000 meters steeplechase	10:22.28

=== National championships ===
Year	Competition	Venue	Position	Event	Notes
2013	2013 Paraguayan Athletics Championships	Asunción, Paraguay	2nd	5000 m	16.13.06
2014	Paraguayan Cross Country Championships	Paraguay	6th	12, 000 m	42.42.33
2014	2014 Paraguayan Athletics Championships	Asunción, Paraguay	3rd	5000 m	15.56.38
2014	2014 Paraguayan Athletics Championships	Asunción, Paraguay	5th	10, 000 m	34.18.51
2015	FPA Campeonato Nacional de Mayores	Asunción, Paraguay	2nd	5000 m	15.47.03
2015	2015 Paraguayan Athletics Championships	Asunción, Paraguay	2nd	5000 m	15.43.27
2015	2015 Paraguayan Athletics Championships	Asunción, Paraguay	3rd	10000 m	33.23.70
2015	Paraguayan National Cross Country Championships	Luque, Paraguay	5th	12000 m	00:44:39.23
2016	Paraguayan National Cross Country Championships	Luque, Paraguay	3rd	12000 m	00:35:42.51
2016	FPA Campeonato Nacional de la Familia 3ra Ronda	Ciudad del Este, Paraguay	3rd	15000 m	4.27.75
