= Asunción International Marathon =

Road running event in Asunción, Paraguay

- Date: August
- Location: Asunción, Paraguay
- Event type: Road
- Distance: Marathon
- Established: 2010; 16 years ago
- Course records: Men's: 02:17:35 (2011); Anderson Chirchir, Women's: 02:33:42 (2012); Eunice Kirwa
- Website: www.pmcpy.org

The Asunción International Marathon (Spanish: Maratón Internacional de Asunción), known by its acronym as MIA, is an annual road running event over the marathon distance (42.195 km) which takes place in August in Asunción, Paraguay, since 2010.
It's organized by Paraguay Marathon Club and the Paraguayan Athletics Federation, member of World Athletics.

== Winners ==
Key: Course record

Year	Men's winner	Country	Time (m:s)	Women's winner	Country	Time (m:s)
2024	Derlys Ayala	Paraguay	02:22:58	Fátima Viviana Romero	Paraguay	03:04:08
2023	Héctor Silguero	Paraguay	02:26:32	Fátima Vázquez	Paraguay	02:52:05
2022	Orlando Javier Elizeche	Paraguay	02:32:57	María Leticia Añazco	Paraguay	03:05:21
2021	Héctor Silguero	Paraguay	02:33:33	Carmen Warkentin	Paraguay	03:03:45
2020						
2019	Orlando Javier Elizeche	Paraguay	02:32:00	Clara Giselle Gómez	Paraguay	03:09:24
2018	Derlys Ayala	Paraguay	02:20:44	Carmen Martinez	Paraguay	02:48:10
2017	Jonathan Cheboswony	Kenya	02:24:28	Teclah Chebet	Kenya	02:54:19
2016	David Bowen	Kenya	02:25:03	Priscilla Lorchima	Kenya	02:49:14
2015	Saidi Makula	Tanzania	02:26:37	Wilma Arizapana	Peru	02:50:39
2014	Njoroge Stephen	Kenya	02:21:59	Carmen Martinez	Paraguay	02:49:37
2013	Kiprop Mutai	Kenya	02:24:38	Carmen Martinez	Paraguay	02:37:06
2012	Ben Mutai	Kenya	02:22:50	Eunice Kirwa	Kenya	02:33:42
2011	Anderson Chirchir	Kenya	02:17:35	Chemtai Rionotukei	Kenya	02:53:10
2010	Elias Rodrigues	Brazil	02:27:51	Gabriela Almada	Argentina	02:55:02

== See also ==
- Sport in Paraguay
- List of marathon races in South America
