= 2014 South American Cross Country Championships =

Running race

- Organisers: CONSUDATLE
- Edition: 29th
- Date: February 23
- Host city: Asunción, Paraguay
- Venue: Jardín Botánico y Zoológico
- Events: 6
- Distances: 12 km – Senior men 8 km – Junior men (U20); 6 km – Youth men (U18); 8 km – Senior women 6 km – Junior women (U20); 4 km – Youth women (U18)
- Participation: 158 athletes from 8 nations

The 2014 South American Cross Country Championships took place on February 23, 2014. The races were held on a 2000 metres circuit at the Jardín Botánico y Zoológico in Asunción, Paraguay.

A detailed report was written by CONSUDATLE, and complete results were published.

== Medallists ==
| Event | Gold | | Silver | | Bronze | |
|---|---|---|---|---|---|---|
Individual
| Senior men (12 km) | Wellington Bezerra da Silva; Brazil | 37:11.66 | Javier Andrés Peña; Colombia | 37:32.59 | Segundo Jami; Ecuador | 37:47.95 |
| Junior (U20) men (8 km) | Jhordan Ccope (Peru) Perú | 25:30.00 | Weverton Fidelis; Brazil | 25:44.04 | Victor Vinicius Alves da Silva; Brazil | 26:00.00 |
| Youth (U18) men (4 km) | Daniel Ferreira do Nascimento; Brazil | 19:35.73 | Sebastián Sánchez; Colombia | 19:47.49 | Jean Carlos Mariano; Brazil | 19:56.50 |
| Senior women (8 km) | Sueli Pereira da Silva; Brazil | 27:43.24 | Carmen Patricia Martínez; Paraguay | 28:05.60 | Rocío Cántara (Peru) Perú | 28:08.77 |
| Junior (U20) women (6 km) | Laydi Curasi (Peru) Perú | 21:42.37 | Aldana Sabatel; Uruguay | 22:05.32 | Sunilda Lozano (Peru) Perú | 22:22.90 |
| Youth (U18) women (3 km) | Micaela Levaggi; Argentina | 14:25.69 | Judith Huamán (Peru) Perú | 14:27.28 | Deysi Quispe (Peru) Perú | 14:31.54 |
Team
| Senior men | Brazil | 18 | Uruguay | 36 | (Peru) Perú | 50 |
| Junior (U20) men | Brazil | 9 | Argentina | 32 | (Peru) Perú | 39 |
| Youth (U18) men | Brazil | 12 | Ecuador | 22 | Uruguay | 33 |
| Senior women | Brazil | 10 | (Peru) Perú | 18 | Paraguay | 25 |
| Junior (U20) women | (Peru) Perú | 8 | Brazil | 29 | Uruguay | 39 |
| Youth (U18) women | (Peru) Perú | 10 | Argentina | 22 | Brazil | 36 |

== Race results ==
=== Senior men's race (12 km) ===
Individual race
| Rank | Athlete | Country | Time |
|---|---|---|---|
| 1st place, gold medalist(s) | Wellington Bezerra da Silva | Brazil | 37:11.66 |
| 2nd place, silver medalist(s) | Javier Andrés Peña | Colombia | 37:32.59 |
| 3rd place, bronze medalist(s) | Segundo Jami | Ecuador | 37:47.95 |
| 4 | Eliezer de Jesus Santos | Brazil | 37:59.21 |
| 5 | Fabiano Valério de Souza | Brazil | 38:08.82 |
| 6 | Santiago Casco | Uruguay | 38:21.69 |
| 7 | Raúl Machacuay | (Peru) Perú | 38:23.29 |
| 8 | Allison Rocha Peres | Brazil | 38:30.46 |
| 9 | Martín Cuestas | Uruguay | 38:30.92 |
| 10 | Santiago Godoy | Uruguay | 38:50.03 |
| 11 | Andrés Zamora | Uruguay | 38:59.27 |
| 12 | Yerson Orellana | (Peru) Perú | 39:04.25 |
| 13 | Nicolás Cuestas | Uruguay | 39:09.26 |
| 14 | Pablo Gardiol | Uruguay | 40:00.11 |
| 15 | René Champi | (Peru) Perú | 40:02.77 |
| 16 | Franklin Jiménez | (Peru) Perú | 40:05.83 |
| 17 | Carlos Alexandre Firmo de Moura | Brazil | 40:19.27 |
| 18 | Jorge Cabrera | Paraguay | 40:20.60 |
| 19 | Orlando Javier Elizeche | Paraguay | 40:48.02 |
| 20 | Pedro Leonardo Duarte | Paraguay | 40:53.00 |
| 21 | Pedro Wilfrido Garay | Paraguay | 41:55.08 |
| 22 | Derlis Ramón Ayala | Paraguay | 42:02.61 |
| 23 | Raúl Vicente Benítez | Paraguay | 45:53.36 |
| — | Carlos Alejandro González | Paraguay | DNF |

Teams
| Rank | Team | Points |
|---|---|---|
| 1st place, gold medalist(s) | Brazil: Wellington Bezerra da Silva / 1; Eliezer de Jesus Santos / 4; Fabiano Valério de Souza / 5; Allison Rocha Peres / 8 | 18 |
| 2nd place, silver medalist(s) | Uruguay: Santiago Casco / 6; Martín Cuestas / 9; Santiago Godoy / 10; Andrés Zamora / 11 | 36 |
| 3rd place, bronze medalist(s) | (Peru) Perú: Raúl Machacuay / 7; Yerson Orellana / 12; René Champi / 15; Franklin Jiménez / 16 | 50 |
| 4 | Paraguay: Jorge Cabrera / 18; Orlando Javier Elizeche / 19; Pedro Leonardo Duarte / 20; Pedro Wilfrido Garay / 21 | 78 |

=== Junior (U20) men's race (8 km) ===
Individual race
| Rank | Athlete | Country | Time |
|---|---|---|---|
| 1st place, gold medalist(s) | Jhordan Ccope | (Peru) Perú | 25:30.00 |
| 2nd place, silver medalist(s) | Weverton Fidelis | Brazil | 25:44.04 |
| 3rd place, bronze medalist(s) | Victor Vinicius Alves da Silva | Brazil | 26:00.00 |
| 4 | Ronald Moraes da Silva | Brazil | 26:15.30 |
| 5 | Nair Pinto | Colombia | 26:23.71 |
| 6 | Eulalio Muñoz | Argentina | 26:24.68 |
| 7 | Carlos Alberto Rodríguez | Colombia | 26:41.43 |
| 8 | Cristian Segovia | Uruguay | 26:50.93 |
| 9 | Felipe Rocha e Pinto | Brazil | 26:51.78 |
| 10 | Pablo Quizhpe | Ecuador | 26:57.07 |
| 11 | Santiago Chitrangulo | Argentina | 27:02.66 |
| 12 | Mauricio Castillo | Uruguay | 27:25.34 |
| 13 | Alexander Tipán | Ecuador | 27:38.78 |
| 14 | Elías David Caballero | Paraguay | 27:40.61 |
| 15 | Juan Ignacio Segovia | Argentina | 27:42.58 |
| 16 | Jonathan Mogrovejo | Ecuador | 27:48.95 |
| 17 | Jhon Vargas | (Peru) Perú | 27:51.72 |
| 18 | Fredy Alcides Alvariza | Paraguay | 27:54.08 |
| 19 | José Andrade | Chile | 27:57.99 |
| 20 | Kevin Gadea | Uruguay | 28:27.36 |
| 21 | Daniel Angoma | (Peru) Perú | 28:46.39 |
| 22 | Abdías Machuca | (Peru) Perú | 28:57.76 |
| 23 | Gonzalo da Luz | Uruguay | 29:00.85 |
| 24 | Carlos Alberto Rodríguez | Paraguay | 29:28.98 |
| 25 | Atilio Pérez | Chile | 29:55.14 |
| 26 | Marcos Gómez | Uruguay | 29:57.88 |
| 27 | Danilo Vera | Chile | 30:00.22 |
| 28 | Maicol Willian Suárez | Paraguay | 30:23.18 |
| 29 | Steven Cassina | Uruguay | 30:28.44 |
| 30 | Danilo Britos | Paraguay | 31:02.38 |
| 31 | Jonathan Giménez | Paraguay | 31:57.18 |

Teams
| Rank | Team | Points |
|---|---|---|
| 1st place, gold medalist(s) | Brazil: Weverton Fidelis / 2; Victor Vinicius Alves da Silva / 3; Ronald Moraes da Silva / 4 | 9 |
| 2nd place, silver medalist(s) | Argentina: Eulalio Muñoz / 6; Santiago Chitrangulo / 11; Juan Ignacio Segovia / 15 | 32 |
| 3rd place, bronze medalist(s) | (Peru) Perú: Jhordan Ccope / 1; Jhon Vargas / 17; Daniel Angoma / 21 | 39 |
| 4 | Ecuador: Pablo Quizhpe / 10; Alexander Tipán / 13; Jonathan Mogrovejo / 16 | 39 |
| 5 | Uruguay: Cristian Segovia / 8; Mauricio Castillo / 12; Kevin Gadea / 20 | 40 |
| 6 | Paraguay: Elías David Caballero / 14; Fredy Alcides Alvariza / 18; Carlos Alberto Rodríguez / 24 | 56 |

=== Youth (U18) men's race (6 km) ===
Individual race
| Rank | Athlete | Country | Time |
|---|---|---|---|
| 1st place, gold medalist(s) | Daniel Ferreira do Nascimento | Brazil | 19:35.73 |
| 2nd place, silver medalist(s) | Sebastián Sánchez | Colombia | 19:47.49 |
| 3rd place, bronze medalist(s) | Jean Carlos Mariano | Brazil | 19:56.50 |
| 4 | Anthony Recalde | Ecuador | 20:09.33 |
| 5 | Diego Arévalo | Ecuador | 20:16.34 |
| 6 | Claudio Maldonado | Chile | 20:27.02 |
| 7 | Carlos Santiago Hernández | Colombia | 20:27.13 |
| 8 | Gustavo Teixeira da Silva | Brazil | 20:27.49 |
| 9 | Maríano Moreira | Uruguay | 20:36.44 |
| 10 | Waldemar González | Uruguay | 20:50.61 |
| 11 | Luis Pachiño | (Peru) Perú | 20:50.63 |
| 12 | Marcelo Godoy | Chile | 21:07.24 |
| 13 | Carlos Arellano | Ecuador | 21:09.14 |
| 14 | Javier Retamar | Uruguay | 21:10.25 |
| 15 | Nahuel Sánchez | Uruguay | 21:10.75 |
| 16 | Claudio Pereira | Argentina | 21:13.51 |
| 17 | Francisco Soto | Paraguay | 21:23.81 |
| 18 | René Anibal Reckziegel | Paraguay | 21:34.43 |
| 19 | Jonathan Lobo | Argentina | 21:37.74 |
| 20 | Diego Ayma | (Peru) Perú | 21:39.05 |
| 21 | Esteban Raúl Samaniego | Paraguay | 22:15.34 |
| 22 | Sebastián Pera | Uruguay | 22:18.02 |
| 23 | Jesús Díaz | Paraguay | 22:22.04 |
| 24 | Pablo Martin Álvarez | Paraguay | 22:24.92 |
| 25 | Diego Favilla | Uruguay | 22:25.81 |
| 26 | José Corilloclla | (Peru) Perú | 22:45.14 |
| 27 | Freddy Arnaldo Barboza | Paraguay | 23:19.36 |
| 28 | Gabriel Rodríguez | Argentina | 25:13.32 |
| — | Luis Palma | (Peru) Perú | DNF |

Teams
| Rank | Team | Points |
|---|---|---|
| 1st place, gold medalist(s) | Brazil: Daniel Ferreira do Nascimento / 1; Jean Carlos Mariano / 3; Gustavo Teixeira da Silva / 8 | 12 |
| 2nd place, silver medalist(s) | Ecuador: Anthony Recalde / 4; Diego Arévalo / 5; Carlos Arellano / 13 | 22 |
| 3rd place, bronze medalist(s) | Uruguay: Maríano Moreira / 9; Waldemar González / 10; Javier Retamar / 14 | 33 |
| 4 | Paraguay: Francisco Soto / 17; René Anibal Reckziegel / 18; Esteban Raúl Samaniego / 21 | 56 |
| 5 | (Peru) Perú: Luis Pachiño / 11; Diego Ayma / 20; José Corilloclla / 26 | 57 |
| 6 | Argentina: Claudio Pereira / 16; Jonathan Lobo / 19; Gabriel Rodríguez / 28 | 63 |

=== Senior women's race (8 km) ===
Individual race
| Rank | Athlete | Country | Time |
|---|---|---|---|
| 1st place, gold medalist(s) | Sueli Pereira da Silva | Brazil | 27:43.24 |
| 2nd place, silver medalist(s) | Carmen Patricia Martínez | Paraguay | 28:05.60 |
| 3rd place, bronze medalist(s) | Rocío Cántara | (Peru) Perú | 28:08.77 |
| 4 | Jaciane Barroso Araújo | Brazil | 29:13.88 |
| 5 | Kleidiane Barbosa Jardim | Brazil | 29:30.22 |
| 6 | Jéssica Paguay | Ecuador | 29:32.83 |
| 7 | Eliona Delgado | (Peru) Perú | 29:58.84 |
| 8 | Yony Ninahuamán | (Peru) Perú | 29:58.94 |
| 9 | Maria Aparecida Ferraz | Brazil | 30:43.02 |
| 10 | María Verónica Domínguez | Paraguay | 30:59.53 |
| 11 | Lorena Sosa | Uruguay | 31:05.04 |
| 12 | Catalina Cconislla | (Peru) Perú | 31:14.98 |
| 13 | María Leticia Añazco | Paraguay | 31:37.17 |
| 14 | Laura Bazallo | Uruguay | 31:53.51 |
| 15 | Cecilia Cabrera | Uruguay | 32:06.17 |
| 16 | Fátima Viviana Romero | Paraguay | 32:23.27 |
| 17 | Katherin Cardozo | Uruguay | 32:58.54 |
| 18 | Rosa Elizabeth Ramos | Paraguay | 33:25.14 |
| 19 | Ana Laura Méndez | Uruguay | 33:52.21 |
| 20 | María Elisa Villasanti | Paraguay | 34:27.50 |
| 21 | Amparo Pampín | Uruguay | 34:39.42 |

Teams
| Rank | Team | Points |
|---|---|---|
| 1st place, gold medalist(s) | Brazil: Sueli Pereira da Silva / 1; Jaciane Barroso Araújo / 4; Kleidiane Barbosa Jardim / 5 | 10 |
| 2nd place, silver medalist(s) | (Peru) Perú: Rocío Cántara / 3; Eliona Delgado / 7; Yony Ninahuamán / 8 | 18 |
| 3rd place, bronze medalist(s) | Paraguay: Carmen Patricia Martínez / 2; María Verónica Domínguez / 10; María Leticia Añazco / 13 | 25 |
| 4 | Uruguay: Lorena Sosa / 11; Laura Bazallo / 14; Cecilia Cabrera / 15 | 40 |

=== Junior (U20) women's race (6 km) ===
Individual race
| Rank | Athlete | Country | Time |
|---|---|---|---|
| 1st place, gold medalist(s) | Laydi Curasi | (Peru) Perú | 21:42.37 |
| 2nd place, silver medalist(s) | Aldana Sabatel | Uruguay | 22:05.32 |
| 3rd place, bronze medalist(s) | Sunilda Lozano | (Peru) Perú | 22:22.90 |
| 4 | Hetaria Palacios | (Peru) Perú | 22:45.34 |
| 5 | Marbel Padilla | Colombia | 22:53.37 |
| 6 | Evelyn Escobar | (Peru) Perú | 23:10.28 |
| 7 | Ana Karolyne de Campos Silva | Brazil | 23:19.73 |
| 8 | María José Calfilaf | Chile | 23:27.70 |
| 9 | Katherine Tisalema | Ecuador | 23:40.60 |
| 10 | Ana Paula Silva Almeida Feitosa | Brazil | 23:48.44 |
| 11 | Carolina Lozano | Argentina | 24:06.44 |
| 12 | Thayna Silva de Melo | Brazil | 24:10.47 |
| 13 | Evellin Inaca dos Passos | Brazil | 24:42.39 |
| 14 | Florencia Orieta | Argentina | 24:51.01 |
| 15 | Bernardita Girolami | Argentina | 25:08.31 |
| 16 | Andrea Denisse Jiménez | Chile | 25:14.79 |
| 17 | Fátima Denisse Amarilla | Paraguay | 26:27.43 |
| 18 | Sofía Andrada | Uruguay | 26:45.15 |
| 19 | Fiorella Macció | Uruguay | 27:50.93 |
| 20 | Verónica Moraña | Uruguay | 28:07.28 |
| 21 | Andrea Lorena Sánchez | Paraguay | 30:52.98 |
| 22 | Florencia Merletti | Uruguay | 31:21.16 |
| 23 | Analía Dietze | Paraguay | 31:57.30 |
| 24 | Tatiana da Luz | Uruguay | 32:00.75 |
| 25 | Jaqueline Villalba | Paraguay | 34:01.58 |
| 26 | Lucero Britos | Paraguay | 34:43.22 |
| — | Mónica Lizbeth García | Colombia | DNF |

Teams
| Rank | Team | Points |
|---|---|---|
| 1st place, gold medalist(s) | (Peru) Perú: Laydi Curasi / 1; Sunilda Lozano / 3; Hetaria Palacios / 4 | 8 |
| 2nd place, silver medalist(s) | Brazil: Ana Karolyne de Campos Silva / 7; Ana Paula Silva Almeida Feitosa / 10; Thayna Silva de Melo / 12 | 29 |
| 3rd place, bronze medalist(s) | Uruguay: Aldana Sabatel / 2; Sofía Andrada / 18; Fiorella Macció / 19 | 39 |
| 4 | Argentina: Carolina Lozano / 11; Florencia Orieta / 14; Bernardita Girolami / 15 | 40 |
| 5 | Paraguay: Fátima Denisse Amarilla / 17; Andrea Lorena Sánchez / 21; Analía Dietze / 23 | 61 |

=== Youth (U18) women's race (3 km) ===
Individual race
| Rank | Athlete | Country | Time |
|---|---|---|---|
| 1st place, gold medalist(s) | Micaela Levaggi | Argentina | 14:25.69 |
| 2nd place, silver medalist(s) | Judith Huamán | (Peru) Perú | 14:27.28 |
| 3rd place, bronze medalist(s) | Deysi Quispe | (Peru) Perú | 14:31.54 |
| 4 | Paulina Burgos | Chile | 14:47.16 |
| 5 | Ruth Cjuro | (Peru) Perú | 14:51.29 |
| 6 | Erika Pilicita | Ecuador | 14:58.87 |
| 7 | Yulisa Champi | (Peru) Perú | 15:04.94 |
| 8 | Camila Alejandra Parra | Colombia | 15:25.74 |
| 9 | Agustina Boucherie | Argentina | 15:30.75 |
| 10 | Graziele Zarri | Brazil | 15:48.57 |
| 11 | Janaina Lima de Paulo | Brazil | 15:48.68 |
| 12 | Clara Baiocchi | Argentina | 15:50.79 |
| 13 | Aldana Machado | Uruguay | 15:51.00 |
| 14 | Wisnny Mathews | Chile | 16:01.34 |
| 15 | Daniele da Silva | Brazil | 16:29.67 |
| 16 | Agostina Vicudo | Uruguay | 16:41.22 |
| 17 | Andrea Rivas | Paraguay | 17:00.00 |
| 18 | Agustina Fernández | Uruguay | 17:03.96 |
| 19 | Nicole Techera | Uruguay | 17:08.80 |
| 20 | Jéssica Camila Elizaur | Paraguay | 17:37.31 |
| 21 | María Pardie | Uruguay | 17:46.21 |
| 22 | Andrea Belén Schrameier | Paraguay | 17:47.58 |
| 23 | Natalia Díaz | Uruguay | 18:33.71 |
| 24 | Leila Macarena Barrios | Paraguay | 19:26.07 |
| 25 | Dalma Yusara Báez | Paraguay | 19:52.57 |
| 26 | Ramona Soledad Ríos | Paraguay | 20:09.19 |

Teams
| Rank | Team | Points |
|---|---|---|
| 1st place, gold medalist(s) | (Peru) Perú: Judith Huamán / 2; Deysi Quispe / 3; Ruth Cjuro / 5 | 10 |
| 2nd place, silver medalist(s) | Argentina: Micaela Levaggi / 1; Agustina Boucherie / 9; Clara Baiocchi / 12 | 22 |
| 3rd place, bronze medalist(s) | Brazil: Graziele Zarri / 10; Janaina Lima de Paulo / 11; Daniele da Silva / 15 | 36 |
| 4 | Uruguay: Aldana Machado / 13; Agostina Vicudo / 16; Agustina Fernández / 18 | 47 |
| 5 | Paraguay: Andrea Rivas / 17; Jéssica Camila Elizaur / 20; Andrea Belén Schrameier / 22 | 59 |

== Medal table (unofficial) ==
| Rank | Nation | Gold | Silver | Bronze | Total |
|---|---|---|---|---|---|
| 1 | Brazil (BRA) | 7 | 2 | 3 | 12 |
| 2 | Peru (PER) | 4 | 2 | 5 | 11 |
| 3 | Argentina (ARG) | 1 | 2 | 0 | 3 |
| 4 | Uruguay (URU) | 0 | 2 | 2 | 4 |
| 5 | Colombia (COL) | 0 | 2 | 0 | 2 |
| 6 | Ecuador (ECU) | 0 | 1 | 1 | 2 |
| Totals (6 entries) | | 12 | 11 | 11 | 34 |

- Note: Totals include both individual and team medals, with medals in the team competition counting as one medal.

== Participation ==
According to an unofficial count, 158 athletes from 8 countries participated. This is in agreement with the official numbers as published.

- Argentina (12)
- Brazil (23)
- Chile (9)
- Colombia (8)
- Ecuador (10)
- Paraguay (36)
- (Peru) Perú (24)
- Uruguay (36)

== See also ==
- 2014 in athletics (track and field)
