= 2013 South American Cross Country Championships =

Running race

- Organisers: CONSUDATLE
- Edition: 28th
- Date: February 24
- Host city: Concordia, Entre Ríos, Argentina
- Venue: Parque del Complejo Ayuí Resort y Spa Termal
- Events: 6
- Distances: 12 km – Senior men 8 km – Junior men (U20); 4 km – Youth men (U18); 8 km – Senior women 6 km – Junior women (U20); 3 km – Youth women (U18)
- Participation: 91 athletes from 7 nations

The 2013 South American Cross Country Championships took place on February 24, 2013. The races were held at the Parque del Complejo Ayuí Resort y Spa Termal in Concordia, Entre Ríos, Argentina. A detailed report of the event was given for the IAAF.

Complete results were published.

== Medallists ==
Event	Gold		Silver		Bronze	
Individual
Senior men (12 km)	Gilmar Lopes; Brazil	39:58	Valério Fabiano; Brazil	40:01	Leandro Prates Oliveira; Brazil	40:12
Junior (U20) men (8 km)	Thiago do Rosário André; Brazil	27:09	Adélio dos Santos; Brazil	27:27	Victor Alves da Silva; Brazil	27:32
Youth (U18) men (4 km)	Wewerton Fidelis; Brazil	13:26	Felipe Rocha e Pinto; Brazil	13:42	Mateus Santos de Jesus; Brazil	13:45
Senior women (8 km)	Cruz Nonata da Silva; Brazil	30:25	Nadia Rodríguez; Argentina	30:50	Michele das Chagas; Brazil	31:04
Junior (U20) women (6 km)	Jéssica Ladeira Soares; Brazil	23:26	Belén Casetta; Argentina	23:51	Hetaira Palacios (Peru) Perú	23:58
Youth (U18) women (3 km)	Aldana Sabatel; Uruguay	11:20	Sheyla Eulogio Paucar (Peru) Perú	11:26	Carolina Lozano; Argentina	11:32
Team
Senior men	Brazil	12	Uruguay	36	Argentina	38
Junior (U20) men	Brazil	12	Argentina	38	Uruguay	44
Youth (U18) men	Brazil	6	Argentina	15	Uruguay	27
Senior women	Brazil	13	Argentina	29	Uruguay	56
Junior (U20) women	Brazil	22	Argentina	33	Uruguay	53
Youth (U18) women	Argentina	16	Uruguay	24		

== Race results ==
=== Senior men's race (12 km) ===
Individual race
Rank	Athlete	Country	Time
1st place, gold medalist(s)	Gilmar Lopes	Brazil	39:58
2nd place, silver medalist(s)	Valério Fabiano	Brazil	40:01
3rd place, bronze medalist(s)	Leandro Prates Oliveira	Brazil	40:12
4	Santiago Casco	Uruguay	40:58
5	Raúl Machacuay	(Peru) Perú	41:10
6	Éderson Pereira	Brazil	41:43
7	Jorge Luis Mérida	Argentina	42:15
8	Martín Méndez	Argentina	42:33
9	Eduardo Gregorio	Uruguay	43:06
10	Roberto Carlos Balcedo	Argentina	43:18
11	Martín Cuestas	Uruguay	43:48
12	Nicolas Cuestas	Uruguay	44:19
13	Enrique José Costa	Argentina	44:55
14	Franco Forestier	Uruguay	45:12
—	Derlis Ayala	Paraguay	DNF
—	Daniel Chaves da Silva	Brazil	DNF

Teams
Rank	Team	Points
1st place, gold medalist(s)	Brazil: Gilmar Lopes / 1; Valério Fabiano / 2; Leandro Prates Oliveira / 3; Éderson Pereira / 6	12
2nd place, silver medalist(s)	Uruguay: Santiago Casco / 4; Eduardo Gregorio / 9; Martín Cuestas / 11; Nicolas Cuestas / 12	36
3rd place, bronze medalist(s)	Argentina: Jorge Luis Mérida / 7; Martín Méndez / 8; Roberto Carlos Balcedo / 10; Enrique José Costa / 13	38

=== Junior (U20) men's race (8 km) ===
Individual race
Rank	Athlete	Country	Time
1st place, gold medalist(s)	Thiago do Rosário André	Brazil	27:09
2nd place, silver medalist(s)	Adélio dos Santos	Brazil	27:27
3rd place, bronze medalist(s)	Victor Alves da Silva	Brazil	27:32
4	Jhordan Alonso Ccope	(Peru) Perú	27:39
5	Leonel César	Argentina	27:41
6	José Rodrigo Vieira da Silva	Brazil	28:04
7	Lucas Jaramillo	Chile	28:12
8	Gabriel Corda	Argentina	28:54
9	Óscar Cáceres	Uruguay	29:17
10	Mauricio Castillo	Uruguay	29:45
11	Cristian Segovia	Uruguay	29:47
12	Nicolás Giménez	Argentina	30:11
13	Juan Ignacio Segovia	Argentina	30:42
14	Andrés Blasina	Uruguay	31:09
15	Fernando Benítez	Uruguay	32:28

Teams
Rank	Team	Points
1st place, gold medalist(s)	Brazil: Thiago do Rosário André / 1; Adélio dos Santos / 2; Victor Alves da Silva / 3; José Rodrigo Vieira da Silva / 6	12
2nd place, silver medalist(s)	Argentina: Leonel César / 5; Gabriel Corda / 8; Nicolás Giménez / 12; Juan Ignacio Segovia / 13	38
3rd place, bronze medalist(s)	Uruguay: Óscar Cáceres / 9; Mauricio Castillo / 10; Cristian Segovia / 11; Andrés Blasina / 14	44

=== Youth (U18) men's race (4 km) ===
Individual race
Rank	Athlete	Country	Time
1st place, gold medalist(s)	Wewerton Fidelis	Brazil	13:26
2nd place, silver medalist(s)	Felipe Rocha e Pinto	Brazil	13:42
3rd place, bronze medalist(s)	Mateus Santos de Jesus	Brazil	13:45
4	Diego Olmedo	Argentina	14:00
5	Germán Elizondo	Argentina	14:04
6	Gerardo Larios	Argentina	14:20
7	Gabriel Rodríguez	Argentina	14:24
8	Kevin Gadea	Uruguay	14:33
9	Mariano Moreira	Uruguay	14:37
10	Waldemar González	Uruguay	15:15
11	Nicolás Opizzo	Uruguay	15:36
12	Santiago Navarrete	Uruguay	16:12

Teams
Rank	Team	Points
1st place, gold medalist(s)	Brazil: Wewerton Fidelis / 1; Felipe Rocha e Pinto / 2; Mateus Santos de Jesus / 3	6
2nd place, silver medalist(s)	Argentina: Diego Olmedo / 4; Germán Elizondo / 5; Gerardo Larios / 6	15
3rd place, bronze medalist(s)	Uruguay: Kevin Gadea / 8; Mariano Moreira / 9; Waldemar González / 10	27

=== Senior women's race (8 km) ===
Individual race
Rank	Athlete	Country	Time
1st place, gold medalist(s)	Cruz Nonata da Silva	Brazil	30:25
2nd place, silver medalist(s)	Nadia Rodríguez	Argentina	30:50
3rd place, bronze medalist(s)	Michele das Chagas	Brazil	31:04
4	Sueli Silva	Brazil	31:15
5	Tatiele Roberta de Carvalho	Brazil	31:37
6	Fiorella Hermitaño	(Peru) Perú	32:03
7	Hortencia Arzapalo	(Peru) Perú	32:29
8	Viviana Micaela Chávez	Argentina	32:57
9	Nancy Soledad Gallo	Argentina	33:27
10	Lorena Carussi	Argentina	33:55
11	María Laura Bazallo	Uruguay	34:20
12	María Verónica Domínguez	Paraguay	35:28
13	Rosa Elizabeth Ramos	Paraguay	35:55
14	Marisol Redón	Uruguay	36:33
15	Laura del Puerto	Uruguay	37:48
16	Lorena Sosa	Uruguay	38:25
17	Ana Laura Méndez	Uruguay	39:34

Teams
Rank	Team	Points
1st place, gold medalist(s)	Brazil: Cruz Nonata da Silva / 1; Michele das Chagas / 3; Sueli Silva / 4; Tatiele Roberta de Carvalho / 5	13
2nd place, silver medalist(s)	Argentina: Nadia Rodríguez / 2; Viviana Micaela Chávez / 8; Nancy Soledad Gallo / 9; Lorena Carussi / 10	29
3rd place, bronze medalist(s)	Uruguay: María Laura Bazallo / 11; Marisol Redón / 14; Laura del Puerto / 15; Lorena Sosa / 16	56

=== Junior (U20) women's race (6 km) ===
Individual race
Rank	Athlete	Country	Time
1st place, gold medalist(s)	Jéssica Ladeira Soares	Brazil	23:26
2nd place, silver medalist(s)	Belén Casetta	Argentina	23:51
3rd place, bronze medalist(s)	Hetaira Palacios	(Peru) Perú	23:58
4	Evelyn Escobar	(Peru) Perú	24:18
5	Sunilda Lozano	(Peru) Perú	24:36
6	Nathalia de Assis Ramalho	Brazil	24:41
7	July Ferreira da Silva	Brazil	24:46
8	Jacira Coutinho de Freitas Santos	Brazil	25:26
9	Sofía Luna	Argentina	25:52
10	Tamara Arias	Argentina	26:15
11	María Pía Fernández	Uruguay	26:30
12	Raffaella Bellizzi	Argentina	27:27
13	Mónica Acuña	Uruguay	28:59
14	Camila Prado	Uruguay	29:18
15	Jennifer Vivas	Uruguay	29:51
16	Verónica Moraña	Uruguay	30:17

Teams
Rank	Team	Points
1st place, gold medalist(s)	Brazil: Jéssica Ladeira Soares / 1; Nathalia de Assis Ramalho / 6; July Ferreira da Silva / 7; Jacira Coutinho de Freitas Santos / 8	22
2nd place, silver medalist(s)	Argentina: Belén Casetta / 2; Sofía Luna / 9; Tamara Arias / 10; Raffaella Bellizzi / 12	33
3rd place, bronze medalist(s)	Uruguay: María Pía Fernández / 11; Mónica Acuña / 13; Camila Prado / 14; Jennifer Vivas / 15	53

=== Youth (U18) women's race (3 km) ===
Individual race
Rank	Athlete	Country	Time
1st place, gold medalist(s)	Aldana Sabatel	Uruguay	11:20
2nd place, silver medalist(s)	Sheyla Eulogio Paucar	(Peru) Perú	11:26
3rd place, bronze medalist(s)	Carolina Lozano	Argentina	11:32
4	Nélida Palomino	(Peru) Perú	11:43
5	Luz Mariana Paco	Bolivia	11:47
6	Melina Mandrile	Argentina	11:50
7	Jennifer Rodríguez	Argentina	12:07
8	Thayna Silva de Melo	Brazil	12:16
9	Tania Tolomeo	Argentina	12:26
10	Ana Karolyne de Campos Silva	Brazil	12:32
11	Aldana Machado	Uruguay	12:49
12	Alfonsina Rivedieu	Uruguay	13:23
13	Nicole Techera	Uruguay	13:57
14	Valentina Álvarez	Uruguay	14:31
—	Graziele Zarri	Brazil	DNF

Teams
Rank	Team	Points
1st place, gold medalist(s)	Argentina: Carolina Lozano / 3; Melina Mandrile / 6; Jennifer Rodríguez / 7	16
2nd place, silver medalist(s)	Uruguay: Aldana Sabatel / 1; Aldana Machado / 11; Alfonsina Rivedieu / 12	24
—	Brazil: Thayna Silva de Melo / 8; Ana Karolyne de Campos Silva / 10; Graziele Zarri / DNF	DNF

== Medal table (unofficial) ==
* Host nation (Argentina)

Rank	Nation	Gold	Silver	Bronze	Total
1	Brazil (BRA)	10	3	4	17
2	Argentina (ARG)*	1	6	2	9
3	Uruguay (URU)	1	2	4	7
4	Peru (PER)	0	1	1	2
Totals (4 entries)		12	12	11	35

- Note: Totals include both individual and team medals, with medals in the team competition counting as one medal.

== Participation ==
According to an unofficial count, 91 athletes from 7 countries participated. This is in agreement with the official numbers as published.

- Argentina (24)
- Bolivia (1)
- Brazil (23)
- Chile (1)
- Paraguay (3)
- (Peru) Perú (9)
- Uruguay (30)

== See also ==
- 2013 in athletics (track and field)
