= Rosa Chacha =

Ecuadorian long-distance runner

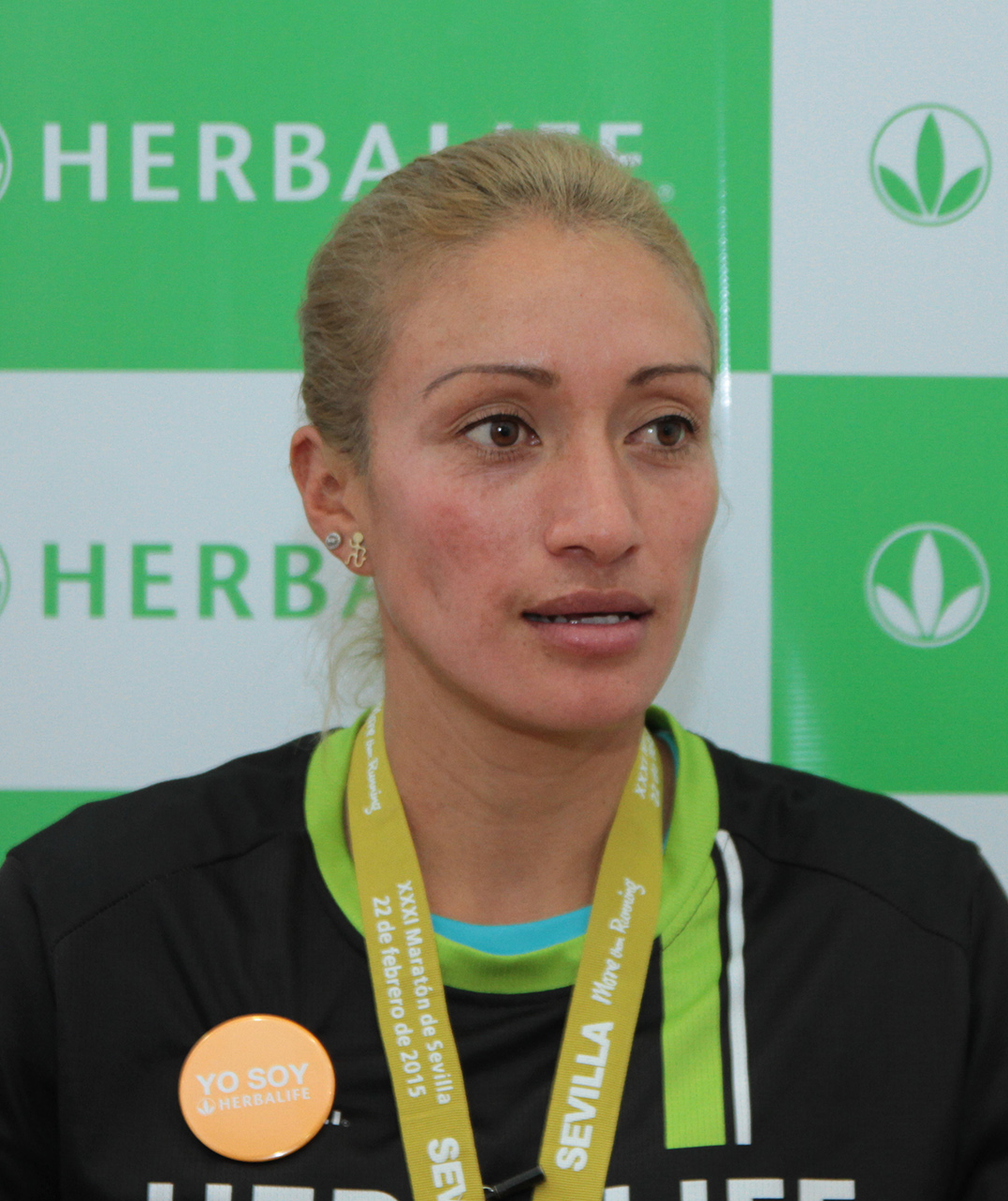
- Chacha in 2014

Personal information
- Full name: Rosa Alba Chacha Chacha
- Born: 8 December 1982 (age 43) Ambato, Tungurahua, Ecuador
- Height: 1.55 m (5 ft 1 in)
- Weight: 45 kg (99 lb)

Sport
- Country: Ecuador
- Sport: Athletics
- Event: Marathon
- Updated on 12 May 2014

Rosa Alba Chacha Chacha (born 8 December 1982) is an Ecuadorian long-distance runner. She is a four-time Olympian in the marathon and is the national record holder in the half marathon. She is the 2022 South American Games marathon champion.

== Career ==
Chacha ran her first race when she was eight years old. She won the 2011 Buenos Aires Marathon with a time of 2:37.22. She qualified for the marathon at the 2011 Pan American Games and finished eighth.

Chacha competed in the marathon at the 2012 Summer Olympics, placing 83rd with a time of 2:40:57, a seasonal best. She then won the 2013 South American Marathon Championships in Buenos Aires. At the 2014 South American Half Marathon Championships, she finished second to Carmen Martínez. She placed seventh in the marathon at the 2015 Pan American Games.

Chacha represented Ecuador at the 2016 Summer Olympics in the marathon and finished 100th with a time of 2:48:52. She then finished 32nd in the marathon at the 2017 World Championships. At the 2018 World Half Marathon Championships, she finished 56th with a time of 1:14:19.

Chacha finished fourth in the marathon at the 2019 Pan American Games with a personal best time of 2:32:45. She represented Ecuador at the 2020 Summer Olympics, and she finished 41st with a time of 2:36:44.

Chacha won the gold medal in the marathon at the 2022 South American Games and qualified for the 2023 Pan American Games. She won the bronze medal in the half marathon at the 2022 Bolivarian Games. At the Pan American Games, she finished fifth with a time of 2:31:01.

Chacha set the national record at the 2023 Hamburg Marathon with a time of 2:26:34 and also met the qualification standard for the 2024 Summer Olympics. At the Olympic Games, she finished 73rd with a time of 2:42:14.

== Personal life ==
Chacha was born in Ambato but moved to Quito, where her mother worked at a farm. She has four siblings. She is coached by her husband, and they have one daughter.

== Personal bests ==
- 5000 m: 16:17.75 min A – Lima, Peru, 19 June 2009
- 10,000 m: 34:51.14 min A – Lima, Peru, 21 June 2009
- Half marathon: 1:11:23 hrs – Buenos Aires, Argentina, 21 August 2022
- Marathon: 2:26:34 hrs – Hamburg, Germany, 23 April 2023

== Achievements ==
Year	Competition	Venue	Position	Event	Notes
Representing Ecuador
2004	South American U23 Championships	Barquisimeto, Venezuela	2nd	5000 m	17:44.04 min
2004	South American U23 Championships	Barquisimeto, Venezuela	1st	10,000 m	36:23.73 min
2005	South American Championships	Cali, Colombia	—	5000 m	DNF
2005	Bolivarian Games	Armenia, Colombia	3rd	5000 m	17:48.63 min
2009	ALBA Games	Havana, Cuba	3rd	10,000 m	35:58.8 min (ht)
2009	South American Championships	Lima, Peru	3rd	5000 m	16:17.75 min A
2009	South American Championships	Lima, Peru	4th	10,000 m	34:51.14 min A
2009	Bolivarian Games	Sucre, Bolivia	3rd	5000 m	18:32.04 min
2009	Bolivarian Games	Sucre, Bolivia	2nd	10,000 m	36:54.21 min
2010	South American Cross Country Championships	Guayaquil, Ecuador	3rd	8 km	27:25.2 min
2010	Ibero-American Championships	San Fernando, Spain	8th	5000 m	16:39.16 min
2011	South American Cross Country Championships	Asunción, Paraguay	11th	8 km	29:23.6 min
2011	ALBA Games	Barquisimeto, Venezuela	2nd	10,000 m	35:37.64 min
2011	South American Half Marathon Championships	Buenos Aires, Argentina	2nd	Half marathon	1:13:45 hrs
2011	Pan American Games	Guadalajara, Mexico	8th	Marathon	2:48:40 hrs A
2012	Olympic Games	London, United Kingdom	83rd	Marathon	2:40:57 hrs
2013	South American Marathon Championships	Buenos Aires, Argentina	1st	Marathon	2:42:57 hrs
2014	South American Half Marathon Championships	Asunción, Paraguay	2nd	Half marathon	1:19:47 hrs
2017	Bolivarian Games	Santa Marta, Colombia	4th	Half marathon	1:17:52 hrs
2019	Pan American Games	Lima, Peru	4th	Marathon	2:32:45 hrs
2019	World Championships	Doha, Qatar	–	Marathon	DNF
2021	Olympic Games	Tokyo, Japan	41st	Marathon	2:36:44 hrs
2022	Bolivarian Games	Valledupar, Colombia	3rd	Half marathon	1:16:43 hrs
2022	World Championships	Eugene, United States	–	Marathon	DNF
2022	South American Games	Asunción, Paraguay	1st	Marathon	2:34:26 hrs
2023	South American Championships	São Paulo, Brazil	6th	10,000 m	35:06.0 min
2023	World Championships	Budapest, Hungary	51st	Marathon	2:42:00 hrs
2023	World Road Running Championships	Riga, Latvia	43rd	Half marathon	1:14:54 hrs
2023	Pan American Games	Santiago, Chile	5th	Marathon	2:31:01 hrs
