= 2011 South American Cross Country Championships =

Running race

- Organisers: CONSUDATLE
- Edition: 26th
- Date: February 20
- Host city: Asunción, Paraguay
- Venue: Club Deportivo Sajonia
- Events: 6
- Distances: 12 km – Senior men 8 km – Junior men (U20); 4 km – Youth men (U18); 8 km – Senior women 6 km – Junior women (U20); 3 km – Youth women (U18)
- Participation: 97 athletes from 10 nations

The 2011 South American Cross Country Championships took place on February 20, 2011. The races were held at the Club Deportivo Sajonia in Asunción, Paraguay. A detailed report of the event was given for the IAAF.

Complete results and results for junior and youth competitions were published.

== Medallists ==
Event	Gold		Silver		Bronze	
Individual
Senior men (12 km)	Solonei Rocha da Silva; Brazil	36:38.9	Gladson Alberto Silva Barbosa; Brazil	36:41.6	Iván Darío González; Colombia	37:47.2
Junior (U20) men (8 km)	José Luis Rojas (Peru) Perú	24:56.4	Miguel Amador; Colombia	25:26.5	Guilherme Ademilson dos Anjos Santos; Brazil	25:48.2
Youth (U18) men (4 km)	Victor Vinícius Alves da Silva; Brazil	12:14.0	Nelson Blanco; Colombia	12:18.0	Mauricio Romario Díaz (Peru) Perú	12:20.0
Senior women (8 km)	Simone Alves da Silva; Brazil	27:04.1	Wilma Arizapana (Peru) Perú	27:45.3	Rosa Godoy; Argentina	27:53.0
Junior (U20) women (6 km)	Alelí Aparicio (Peru) Perú	21:20.6	Florencia Borelli; Argentina	21:26.0	Jovana de la Cruz (Peru) Perú	21:37.5
Youth (U18) women (3 km)	Zulema Arenas (Peru) Perú	10:09.8	Ana Ailín Funes; Argentina	10:12.6	Lucy Basilio (Peru) Perú	10:12.9
Team
Senior men	Brazil	7	Ecuador	25	Chile	36
Junior (U20) men	Brazil	15	Uruguay	23	Argentina	39
Youth (U18) men	Brazil	5	Colombia	8	Argentina	15
Senior women	Brazil	14	Argentina	17	(Peru) Perú	23
Junior (U20) women	(Peru) Perú	10	Brazil	21	Paraguay	39
Youth (U18) women	(Peru) Perú	4	Argentina	7	Brazil	11

== Race results ==
=== Senior men's race (12 km) ===
Individual race
Rank	Athlete	Country	Time
1st place, gold medalist(s)	Solonei Rocha da Silva	Brazil	36:38.9
2nd place, silver medalist(s)	Gladson Alberto Silva Barbosa	Brazil	36:41.6
3rd place, bronze medalist(s)	Iván Darío González	Colombia	37:47.2
4	Éderson Pereira	Brazil	37:51.4
5	Joilson Bernardo da Silva	Brazil	37:55.1
6	Cristóbal Narváez	Ecuador	38:06.6
7	Miguel Almachi	Ecuador	38:22.8
8	Jorge Mérida	Argentina	38:26.2
9	Enzo Yañez	Chile	38:32.1
10	Víctor Aravena	Chile	38:35.7
11	Derlis Ayala	Paraguay	38:38.9
12	César Pilaluisa	Ecuador	38:49.9
13	Matías Scheil	Argentina	39:14.3
14	Santiago Casco	Uruguay	39:30.6
15	Pedro Ramos	Ecuador	39:37.7
16	Pedro Duarte	Paraguay	39:38.3
17	Leslie Encina	Chile	40:14.5
18	Franklin Aduviri	Bolivia	40:37.8
19	Martín Méndez	Argentina	40:47.8
20	Franco Forestier	Uruguay	41:13.2
21	José Mario Rodríguez	Uruguay	42:01.7
22	Aldo González	Paraguay	43:01.1
23	Jorge Castillo	Paraguay	43:14.2
24	Orlando Elizeche	Paraguay	44:06.6
—	Israel dos Anjos	Brazil	DNF

Teams
Rank	Team	Points
1st place, gold medalist(s)	Brazil: Solonei Rocha da Silva / 1; Gladson Alberto Silva Barbosa / 2; Éderson Pereira / 4; (Joilson Bernardo da Silva) / (5); (Israel dos Anjos) / (DNF)	7
2nd place, silver medalist(s)	Ecuador: Cristóbal Narváez / 6; Miguel Almachi / 7; César Pilaluisa / 12; (Pedro Ramos) / (15)	25
3rd place, bronze medalist(s)	Chile: Enzo Yañez / 9; Víctor Aravena / 10; Leslie Encina / 17	36
4	Argentina: Jorge Mérida / 8; Matías Scheil / 13; Martín Méndez / 19	40
5	Paraguay: Derlis Ayala / 11; Pedro Duarte / 16; Aldo González / 22; (Jorge Castillo) / (23); (Orlando Elizeche) / (24)	49
6	Uruguay: Santiago Casco / 14; Franco Forestier / 20; José Mario Rodríguez / 21	55

- Note: Athletes in parentheses did not score for the team result.

=== Junior (U20) men's race (8 km) ===
Individual race
Rank	Athlete	Country	Time
1st place, gold medalist(s)	José Luis Rojas	(Peru) Perú	24:56.4
2nd place, silver medalist(s)	Miguel Amador	Colombia	25:26.5
3rd place, bronze medalist(s)	Guilherme Ademilson dos Anjos Santos	Brazil	25:48.2
4	Javier Marmo	Uruguay	26:03.5
5	João Luís Ferreira Prado Filho	Brazil	26:17.8
6	Lucirio Antonio Garrido	Venezuela	26:21.6
7	Ioran Fernandes Etchechury	Brazil	26:59.1
8	Gaspar Gexmonat	Uruguay	27:11.0
9	David Prudencio Rodríguez	Argentina	27:11.8
10	Edgar Fernández	(Peru) Perú	27:35.0
11	Gerardo Martino	Uruguay	27:49.0
12	William Aveiro	Paraguay	27:52.7
13	Sebastián Molinet	Chile	28:02.2
14	Gustavo Frencia	Argentina	28:39.8
15	Ataíde Felipe de Souza	Brazil	28:42.6
16	Sebastián Cano	Argentina	28:56.2
17	Wilfrido Benítez	Paraguay	30:49.0
—	Federico Bruno	Argentina	DNF
—	Antonio Ariel Sanabria	Paraguay	DNF

Teams
Rank	Team	Points
1st place, gold medalist(s)	Brazil: Guilherme Ademilson dos Anjos Santos / 3; João Luís Ferreira Prado Filho / 5; Ioran Fernandes Etchechury / 7; (Ataíde Felipe de Souza) / (15)	15
2nd place, silver medalist(s)	Uruguay: Javier Marmo / 4; Gaspar Gexmonat / 8; Gerardo Martino / 11	23
3rd place, bronze medalist(s)	Argentina: David Prudencio Rodríguez / 9; Gustavo Frencia / 14; Sebastián Cano / 16; (Federico Bruno) / (DNF)	39
—	Paraguay: William Aveiro / 12; Wilfrido Benítez / 17; Antonio Ariel Sanabria / (DNF)	(DNF)

- Note: Athletes in parentheses did not score for the team result.

=== Youth (U18) men's race (4 km) ===
Individual race
Rank	Athlete	Country	Time
1st place, gold medalist(s)	Victor Vinícius Alves da Silva	Brazil	12:14.0
2nd place, silver medalist(s)	Nelson Blanco	Colombia	12:18.0
3rd place, bronze medalist(s)	Mauricio Romario Díaz	(Peru) Perú	12:20.0
4	Romário Santos Viana	Brazil	12:20.3

Teams
Rank	Team	Points
1st place, gold medalist(s)	Brazil: Victor Vinícius Alves da Silva / 1; Romário Santos Viana / 4	5
2nd place, silver medalist(s)	Colombia: Nelson Blanco / 2; Ramiro Sanabria / 6	8
3rd place, bronze medalist(s)	Argentina: Javier Ruíz / 7; Cristián Cristaldo / 8	15
4	Uruguay: Matías Barros / 9; Manuel Quintera / 10; (Luciano Andrada) / (11)	19
5	Paraguay: Pedro Recalde / 12; Alexis Cáceres / 13; (Atanasio Ríos) / (14)	25

- Note: Athletes in parentheses did not score for the team result.

=== Senior women's race (8 km) ===
Individual race
Rank	Athlete	Country	Time
1st place, gold medalist(s)	Simone Alves da Silva	Brazil	27:04.1
2nd place, silver medalist(s)	Wilma Arizapana	(Peru) Perú	27:45.3
3rd place, bronze medalist(s)	Rosa Godoy	Argentina	27:53.0
4	Nadia Rodríguez	Argentina	27:59.6
5	Ángela Figueroa	Colombia	28:03.5
6	Adriana Aparecida da Silva	Brazil	28:17.8
7	Tatiele Roberta de Carvalho	Brazil	28:21.7
8	Camila Aparecida dos Santos	Brazil	28:27.2
9	Rocío Cantará	(Peru) Perú	28:44.9
10	Nancy Gallo	Argentina	29:00.8
11	Rosa Chacha	Ecuador	29:23.6
12	Yoni Ninahuamán	(Peru) Perú	29:38.6
13	Andrea Latapie	Argentina	29:41.5
14	Eliona Delgado	(Peru) Perú	30:29.8
15	Carmen Martínez	Paraguay	30:37.3
16	Yeisy Álvarez	Venezuela	30:59.5
17	Rosa Ramos	Paraguay	31:12.5
18	Dina Cid	Chile	32:45.7
19	Gladys Riquelme	Paraguay	40:56.4

Teams
Rank	Team	Points
1st place, gold medalist(s)	Brazil: Simone Alves da Silva / 1; Adriana Aparecida da Silva / 6; Tatiele Roberta de Carvalho / 7; (Camila Aparecida dos Santos) / (8)	14
2nd place, silver medalist(s)	Argentina: Rosa Godoy / 3; Nadia Rodríguez / 4; Nancy Gallo / 10; (Andrea Latapie) / (13)	17
3rd place, bronze medalist(s)	(Peru) Perú: Wilma Arizapana / 2; Rocío Cantará / 9; Yoni Ninahuamán / 12; (Eliona Delgado) / (14)	23
4	Paraguay: Carmen Martínez / 15; Rosa Ramos / 17; Gladys Riquelme / 19	51

- Note: Athletes in parentheses did not score for the team result.

=== Junior (U20) women's race (6 km) ===
Individual race
Rank	Athlete	Country	Time
1st place, gold medalist(s)	Alelí Aparicio	(Peru) Perú	21:20.6
2nd place, silver medalist(s)	Florencia Borelli	Argentina	21:26.0
3rd place, bronze medalist(s)	Jovana de la Cruz	(Peru) Perú	21:37.5
4	Patrícia Lemos da Silva	Brazil	21:47.4
5	Andrea Torres	Ecuador	22:16.6
6	Inga Quinto	(Peru) Perú	22:25.9
7	Florencia Celser	Argentina	22:28.3
8	Erika Oliveira Lima	Brazil	22:43.6
9	Zeneide Soares Lisboa	Brazil	24:03.3
10	Giselle Álvarez	Chile	24:13.4
11	Mónica Triana	Colombia	24:24.3
12	Tania Sapoznik	Paraguay	26:16.2
13	Conny Willms	Paraguay	27:55.9
14	Deysi Carolina Fleitas	Paraguay	30:02.2
15	Daysi Santander	Paraguay	33:23.2
—	Adriana Cristina Silva da Luz	Brazil	DNF

Teams
Rank	Team	Points
1st place, gold medalist(s)	(Peru) Perú: Alelí Aparicio / 1; Jovana de la Cruz / 3; Inga Quinto / 6	10
2nd place, silver medalist(s)	Brazil: Patrícia Lemos da Silva / 4; Erika Oliveira Lima / 8; Zeneide Soares Lisboa / 9; (Adriana Cristina Silva da Luz) / (DNF)	21
3rd place, bronze medalist(s)	Paraguay: Tania Sapoznik / 12; Conny Willms / 13; Deysi Carolina Fleitas / 14; (Daysi Santander) / (15)	39

- Note: Athletes in parentheses did not score for the team result.

=== Youth (U18) women's race (3 km) ===
Individual race
Rank	Athlete	Country	Time
1st place, gold medalist(s)	Zulema Arenas	(Peru) Perú	10:09.8
2nd place, silver medalist(s)	Ana Ailín Funes	Argentina	10:12.6
3rd place, bronze medalist(s)	Lucy Basilio	(Peru) Perú	10:12.9
4	Jéssica Ladeira Soares	Brazil	10:32.9
5	Sofía Luna	Argentina	11:01.9
6	Marbell Padilla	Colombia	11:04.2
7	Jacira Coutinho de Freitas Santos	Brazil	11:21.7
8	Mónica García	Colombia	11:25.2
9	Fátima Amarilla	Paraguay	11:41.4
10	María José Bellagamba	Chile	11:49.4
11	María Pía Fernández	Uruguay	11:54.4
12	Evelyn Santillano	Uruguay	12:21.7
13	Olga Fleitas	Paraguay	13:13.7
14	Ada López	Paraguay	13:20.9

Teams
Rank	Team	Points
1st place, gold medalist(s)	(Peru) Perú: Zulema Arenas / 1; Lucy Basilio / 3	4
2nd place, silver medalist(s)	Argentina: Ana Ailín Funes / 2; Sofía Luna / 5	7
3rd place, bronze medalist(s)	Brazil: Jéssica Ladeira Soares / 4; Jacira Coutinho de Freitas Santos / 7	11
4	Colombia: Marbell Padilla / 6; Mónica García / 8	14
5	Paraguay: Fátima Amarilla / 9; Olga Fleitas / 13; (Ada López) / (14)	22
6	Uruguay: María Pía Fernández / 11; Evelyn Santillano / 12	23

- Note: Athletes in parentheses did not score for the team result.

== Medal table (unofficial) ==
Rank	Nation	Gold	Silver	Bronze	Total
1	Brazil (BRA)	7	2	2	11
2	Peru (PER)	5	1	4	10
3	Argentina (ARG)	0	4	3	7
4	Colombia (COL)	0	3	1	4
5	Ecuador (ECU)	0	1	0	1
5	Uruguay (URU)	0	1	0	1
7	Chile (CHI)	0	0	1	1
Totals (7 entries)		12	12	11	35

- Note: Totals include both individual and team medals, with medals in the team competition counting as one medal.

== Participation ==
According to an unofficial count, 97 athletes from 10 countries participated.

- Argentina (15)
- Bolivia (1)
- Brazil (21)
- Chile (7)
- Colombia (7)
- Ecuador (6)
- Paraguay (18)
- (Peru) Perú (12)
- Uruguay (8)
- Venezuela (2)

== See also ==
- 2011 in athletics (track and field)
