= Raúl Benítez =

Paraguayan long-distance runner

Raúl Vicente Benítez (born 26 June 1994) is a Paraguayan long distance runner who holds the national records of 10 km, fulfilling this in 2013 running 10 km in 35:36:01m. He was an athlete of the Asociación de Atletismo del Alto Paraná, and later represented Olímpico Athletic Club, also in Ciudad del Este. Benítez represented Paraguay at the 2014 South American Cross Country Championships.

== Competition record ==
=== International competitions ===
Year	Competition	Venue	Position	Event	Notes
Representing Paraguay
2014	2014 South American Cross Country Championships	Asunción, Paraguay	23rd	12 km	45:53.36
2017	Corrida Internacional Hernandarias	Hernandarias, Paraguay	4th	15 km	0:56:56.02

=== National championships ===
Year	Competition	Venue	Position	Event	Notes
2015	Paraguayan National Cross Country Championships	Luque, Paraguay	8th	12000 m	00:48:08.11
2016	Paraguayan National Cross Country Championships	Luque, Paraguay	5th	12000 m	00:36:39.06
2017	Corrida Franco	Presidente Franco, Paraguay	1st	8.8k	24:27.61
