= Wellington Bezerra da Silva =

Brazilian long-distance runner

Personal information
- Born: 19 June 1988 (age 37)

Sport
- Country: Brazil
- Sport: Long-distance running

Wellington Bezerra da Silva (born 19 June 1988) is a Brazilian long-distance runner. In 2019, he competed in the men's marathon at the 2019 World Athletics Championships held in Doha, Qatar. He finished in 44th place.

In 2014, he won the gold medal in the men's senior race (12 km) at the 2014 South American Cross Country Championships held in Asunción, Paraguay.

In 2019, he competed in the men's marathon event at the 2019 Pan American Games held in Lima, Peru. He finished in 11th place with a time of 2:17:33.
