= Diego Ferreira (sprinter) =

Paraguayan athletics competitor

Personal information
- Nationality: Paraguay
- Born: September 22, 1975 (age 51)
- Height: 1.66 m (5 ft 5 in)
- Weight: 66 kg (146 lb)

Sport
- Sport: Athletics
- Events: 60 metres 100 metres 200 metres

Diego Ferreira (born December 22, 1975) is a Paraguayan athlete specializing in the 100 metres.

Ferreira is the current Paraguayan indoor record holder in the 60 metres with a time of 6.81 seconds and in the 200 metres with a time of 22.69 seconds. Both records he set in February 2004. He is also the Paraguayan record holder in the 4 × 400 m relay.

Participating in the 2004 Summer Olympics, he achieved fifth place in his 100 metres heat, thus failing to make it through to the second round.

He represented his country at many other tournaments including at the Ibero-American Championships in Athletics (2000 and 2004); IAAF World Indoor Championships (2001, 2003 and 2004); 2001 World Championships in Athletics; 2003 Pan American Games and Summer Universiade (2001 and 2003).
