= Orlando Javier Elizeche =

Paraguayan long-distance runner

Orlando Javier Elizeche (born 3 June 1987) is a Paraguayan Long Distance runner from Encarnación. He represented Paraguay at the 2008 South American Cross Country Championships, 2011 South American Cross Country Championships and 2014 South American Cross Country Championships and is tied to Club Bella Vista in the Federación Paraguaya de Atletismo. At the 2014 South American Cross Country Championships, he finished in 19th position of the Senior men's 12 km race event in a time of 40:48.02.

== Competition record ==
=== International competitions ===
Year	Competition	Venue	Position	Event	Notes
Representing Paraguay
2008	2008 South American Cross Country Championships	Asunción, Paraguay	20th	12 km	47:18
2011	2011 South American Cross Country Championships	Asunción, Paraguay	24th	12 km	44:06.6
2014	2014 South American Cross Country Championships	Asunción, Paraguay	19th	12 km	40:48.02
2017	2017 South American Championships	Luque, Paraguay		10 km	DNF
2017	2017 South American Championships	Luque, Paraguay	13th	5000 meters	16:37.48

=== National championships ===
Year	Competition	Venue	Position	Event	Notes
2015	2015 Paraguayan Athletics Championships	Asunción, Paraguay	3rd	5000 m	16.06.67
2015	2015 Paraguayan Athletics Championships	Asunción, Paraguay	1st	10000 m	32.22.40
2015	Paraguayan National Cross Country Championships	Luque, Paraguay	4th	12000 m	00:44:02.86
2016	Paraguayan National Cross Country Championships	Luque, Paraguay	1st	12000 m	00:34:56.21
2018	Torneo Sajonia de 2018	Asunción, Paraguay	1st	5000 m	15.34.28
