= List of Paraguayan records in athletics =

The following are the national records in athletics in Paraguay maintained by its national athletics federation: Federación Paraguaya de Atletismo (FPA).

== Outdoor ==
Key to tables: Awaiting ratification Record not kept by FPA Not ratified or later rescinded by FPA

=== Men ===
Event	Record	Athlete	Date	Meet	Place	Ref.
100 m	10.19 A (±0.0 m/s)	César Almirón	8 June 2024	World Continental Tour Challenger - Mario Paz	Cochabamba, Bolivia	
150 m	15.80 (−1.0 m/s)	Christopher Ortiz	3 February 2018	Torneo Criollo	Asunción, Paraguay	
200 m	20.41 (+0.7 m/s)	César Almirón	9 June 2024	Grand Prix Mario Paz	Cochabamba, Bolivia	
400 m	46.62	Augusto José Stanley	8 June 2012	Ibero-American Championships	Barquisimeto, Venezuela	
800 m	1:50.17	Francisco Figueredo	13 August 1987	Pan American Games	Indianapolis, United States	
1500 m	3:48.74	Ramón López	19 September 1988	Olympic Games	Seoul, South Korea	
Mile	4:16.72	Derlis Ayala	9 February 2013		Asunción, Paraguay	
3000 m	8:20.4	Jorge Cabrera	25 February 2006		Asunción, Paraguay	
5000 m	13:53.20	Derlis Ayala	20 April 2018	Mt. SAC Relays	Torrance, United States	
5 km (road)	14:36+	Derlis Ayala	24 March 2018	World Half Marathon Championships	Valencia, Spain	
10,000 m	29:48.27	Derlis Ayala	25 March 2015	South American Grand Prix	Buenos Aires, Argentina	
10 km (road)	29:40+	Derlis Ayala	24 March 2018	World Half Marathon Championships	Valencia, Spain	
15 km (road)	44:53+	Derlis Ayala	24 March 2018	World Half Marathon Championships	Valencia, Spain	
20 km (road)	1:00:05+	Derlis Ayala	24 March 2018	World Half Marathon Championships	Valencia, Spain	
Half marathon	1:03:19	Derlis Ayala	24 March 2018	World Half Marathon Championships	Valencia, Spain	
25 km (road)	1:16:32+	Derlis Ayala	6 December 2020	Valencia Marathon	Valencia, Spain	
30 km (road)	1:32:18+	Derlis Ayala	6 December 2020	Valencia Marathon	Valencia, Spain	
Marathon	2:10:11	Derlis Ayala	6 December 2020	Valencia Marathon	Valencia, Spain	
110 m hurdles	14.57 (+1.5 m/s)	Ernesto Stanley	19 November 2011	Campeonato Nacional Universitario	Asunción, Paraguay	
400 m hurdles	51.88	Francisco Rojas Soto	24 July 1975	Sudamericano	Rio de Janeiro, Brasil	
3000 m steeplechase	8:52.62	Ramón López	28 September 1988	Olympic Games	Seoul, South Korea	
High jump	2.06 m	Humberto Sarubbi	19 July 1986		Athens, Greece	
High jump	2.06 m	Humberto Sarubbi	16 September 1986		Quito, Ecuador	
High jump	2.06 m	Germán Hüttemann	27 October 2001		Asunción, Paraguay	
Pole vault	4.50 m	Hugo Ramos	26 May 1990		Asunción, Paraguay	
Long jump	7.42 m	Olegario Olmedo	25 July 1987		Asunción, Paraguay	
Triple jump	15.16 m (+2.0 m/s)	Oscar Alvarenga	13 June 2004		São Paulo, Brazil	
Shot put	18.31 m	Ramón Jiménez Gaona	28 March 1992		Los Angeles, United States	
Discus throw	64.30 m (Note: per IAAF source, 64.28 m per federation source)	Ramón Jiménez Gaona	23 May 1992		Eugene, United States	
Hammer throw	56.58 m	Santiago Sasiaín	27 September 2015	Paraguayan Championships	Asunción, Paraguay	
Hammer throw	58.16 m (Note: ratified by federation but not recognised by IAAF)	Santiago Sasiaín	10 August 2017		Asunción, Paraguay	
Javelin throw	84.70 m AR	Edgar Baumann	17 October 1999		San Marcos, United States	
Decathlon	6943 pts h	Claudio Escauriza	12–13 October 1982		Asunción, Paraguay	
Decathlon	100m / Long jump / Shot put / High jump / 400m / 110m H / Discus / Pole vault / Javelin / 1500m; 11.1 / 7.15 m / 12.86 m / 1.85 m / 53.0 / 16.8 / 45.94 m / 4.20 m / 60.48 m / 5:14.7					
20 km walk (road)	1:37:00	Oscar Meza Achi	21 June			
50 km walk (road)						
4 × 100 m relay	39.05 A	Paraguay; Jonathan Wolk; Misael Zalazar; Fredy Maidana; César Almirón	7 April 2024	Encuentro FMAA César Moreno Bravo	Mexico City, Mexico	
4 × 400 m relay	3:17.66	Paraguay; Diego Ferreira; A. Nogueira; Nicolás López Moreira; R. Cabrera	1 June 2003		Rosario, Argentina	

=== Women ===
Event	Record	Athlete	Date	Meet	Place	Ref.
60 m	7.83	Dana Jourdan	2 March 2013		Asunción, Paraguay	
100 m	11.74 (+1.5 m/s)	Xenia Hiebert	12 December 2020	Copa de la Victoria Meet	Asunción, Paraguay	
200 m	24.31 (+1.0 m/s)	Anna Camila Pirelli	16 April 2016	Torneo Profesor William Rivarola	Asunción, Paraguay	
400 m	56.62	Anna Camila Pirelli	2 March 2019	Torneo Criollo UAA	Asunción, Paraguay	
800 m	2:06.38	Maria Caballero	28 November 2013	Bolivarian Games	Trujillo, Peru	
1500 m	4:20.93	Maria Caballero	26 November 2013	Bolivarian Games	Trujillo, Peru	
3000 m	9:42.88	Maria Caballero	30 January 2016		Asunción, Paraguay	
5000 m	16:13.28	Carmen Martínez	3 August 2014	Ibero-American Championships	São Paulo, Brazil	
5 km (road)	19:33	Maria Zubizarreta	21 July 2010		Cardiff, United Kingdom	
10,000 m	33:18.22	Carmen Martínez	5 August 2017	World Championships	London, United Kingdom	
10 km (road)	34:34	Carmen Patricia Martínez	25 May 2014		Campinas, Brazil	
One hour	12057 m Mx	Maria Zubizarreta	8 March 2009		Barry, United Kingdom	
15 km (road)	53:08+	Carmen Martínez	26 March 2016	World Half Marathon Championships	Cardiff, United Kingdom	
20 km (road)	1:11:49+	Carmen Patricia Martínez	26 March 2016	World Half Marathon Championships	Cardiff, United Kingdom	
Half marathon	1:15:44	Carmen Patricia Martínez	26 March 2016	World Half Marathon Championships	Cardiff, Great Britain	
25 km (road)	1:31:06+	Carmen Patricia Martínez	12 April 2015	Rotterdam Marathon	Rotterdam, Netherlands	
30 km (road)	1:49:44+	Carmen Patricia Martínez	12 April 2015	Rotterdam Marathon	Rotterdam, Netherlands	
Marathon	2:35:17	Carmen Patricia Martínez	30 April 2017	Düsseldorf Marathon	Düsseldorf, Germany	
60 m hurdles	8.68	Ana Camila Pirelli	30 January 2016	Torneo Criollo	Asunción, Paraguay	
100 m hurdles	13.40 A (+1.7 m/s) (Note: record set during heptathlon competition)	Ana Camila Pirelli	23 April 2016	Colombian Championships	Medellín, Colombia	
400 m hurdles	1:01.89	Fátima Amarilla	24 June 2017	South American Championships	Luque, Paraguay	
3000 m steeplechase	10:39.2 h	María Caballero	27 July 2013	Aniversario Club Olimpia	Asunción, Paraguay	
High jump	1.68 m	Carolina Tovar	23 November 1990	South American Games	Lima, Peru	
High jump	1.68 m	Ana Camila Pirelli	1 June 2013		Ottawa, Canada	
Pole vault	3.75 m	Catalina Amarilla	3 June 2015	Stabhochsprung-Meeting VI	Wipperfürth, Germany	
Pole vault	3.80 m (Note: ratified by federation but not recognised by IAAF)	Catalina Amarilla	4 July 2015	Stabhochsprung-Meeting VII	Wipperfürth, Germany	
Long jump	5.91 m	Natalia Toledo	29 June 1992 (Note: by IAAF source, 28 June 1992 by federation source)		Asunción, Paraguay	
Long jump	5.91 m (Note: not ratified by federation but recognised by IAAF)	Natalia Toledo	27 March 1993		Asunción, Paraguay	
Triple jump	12.57 m (+1.8 m/s)	Lizel Gómez	23 September 2016	South American Under-23 Championships	Lima, Peru	
Shot put	14.87 m	Ana Camila Pirelli	12 July 2019	Broward Elite Athletic C. Summer Open	Fort Lauderdale, United States	
Discus throw	44.70 m	Sadith Fretes	13 May 1990		Asunción, Paraguay	
Hammer throw	60.81 m	Paola Miranda	27 May 2016	NCAA Division I West Preliminary	Lawrence, United States	
Javelin throw	57.77 m	Leryn Franco	8 June 2012	Ibero-American Championships	Maracay, Venezuela	
Heptathlon	5907 pts	Anna Camila Pirelli	7–8 August 2019	Pan American Games	Lima, Peru	
Heptathlon	100m H / High jump / Shot put / 200m / Long jump / Javelin / 800m; 13.54 (+0.2 m/s) / 1.62 m / 13.92 m / 24.82 (+1.0 m/s) / 5.47 m (+0.5 m/s) / 48.56 m / 2:15.29					
20 km walk (road)	2:13:39 (Note: not ratified by federation but recognised by IAAF)	Mirna Fretes	4 June 2004		Rosario, Argentina	
4 × 100 m relay	47.43	Paraguay; Dure Briza; Silvana Caceres; Ruth Baez; Xenia Hiebert	29 September 2018	South American U23 Championships	Cuenca, Ecuador	
4 × 400 m relay	3:59.30	L. Gómez; C. Wilms; F. Amarilla; H. Caballero	27 September 2015		Asunción, Paraguay	

=== Mixed ===
Event	Record	Athlete	Date	Meet	Place	Ref.
4 × 100 m relay	42.22	Paraguay; Fredy Maidana; Jonathan Wolk; Macarena Giménez; Xenia Hiebert	1 December 2025	Bolivarian Games	Lima, Peru	
4 × 400 m relay	3:34.79	Paraguay; Marcos González; Araceli Martinez; Paul Wood; Montserrath Gauto	10 May 2024	Ibero-American Championships	Cuiabá, Brazil	

== Indoor ==
=== Men ===
Event	Record	Athlete	Date	Meet	Place	Ref.
60 m	6.81	Diego Ferreira	28 February 2004		Budapest, Hungary	
200 m	22.69	Diego Ferreira	24 February 2004		Budapest, Hungary	
300 m	33.83	Christopher Ortiz	January 2018	Paraguayan Trials	Asunción, Paraguay	
400 m	50.95	Julio Caballero	8 March 1991	World Championships	Seville, Spain	
400 m	49.49 A	Marcos Antonio González	27 January 2024		Cochabamba, Bolivia	
800 m	1:54.29	Augusto José Stanley	1 March 2013	Arkansas Final Qualifier	Fayetteville, United States	
1500 m						
3000 m	8:33.95	Jorge Cabrera	10 March 2006	World Championships	Moscow, Russia	
60 m hurdles						
High jump	1.82 m	Alexander Männel	24 January 2025	5th Annual Brant Tolsma Invitational (Note: by World Athletics source; ASUN Championships by FPA source, probably a typo)	Lynchburg, United States (Note: by World Athletics source; Louisville by FPA source, probably a typo)	
Pole vault	4.35 m	Sebastian Moreno-Coscia	10 February 2018	Jacksonville Athletic Club Mall Vault	Jacksonville, United States	
Long jump						
Triple jump						
Shot put	17.58 m A	Ramón Jiménez Gaona	27 February 1993		Reno, United States	
Heptathlon	5193 pts	Alexander Männel	24 January 2025	5th Annual Brant Tolsma Invitational (Note: by World Athletics source; ASUN Championships by FPA source, probably a typo)	Lynchburg, United States (Note: by World Athletics source; Louisville by FPA source, probably a typo)	
Heptathlon	60m / Long jump / Shot put / High jump / 60m H / Pole vault / 1000m; 7.13 / 6.77 m / 11.83 m / 1.82 m / 8.43 / 4.70 m / 3:00.46					
5000 m walk						
4 × 400 m relay						

=== Women ===
Event	Record	Athlete	Date	Meet	Place	Ref.
60 m						
200 m	27.09	Ana Camila Pirelli	6 February 2009		Joplin, United States	
400 m						
800 m	2:24.90	Ana Camila Pirelli	27 February 2011		Fargo, United States	
800 m	2:24.36 OT (Note: record set during pentathlon competition)	Ana Camila Pirelli	27 January 2012	Jayhawk Classic	Lawrence, United States	
1500 m	5:05.10	Lilian López	12 March 1995	World Championships	Barcelona, Spain	
Mile	4:51.71	Maria Caballero	1 March 2013	Arkansas Final Qualifier	Fayetteville, United States	
3000 m						
60 m hurdles	9.07	Ana Camila Pirelli	6 January 2012	Arkansas Invitational	Fayetteville, United States	
High jump	1.63 m (Note: record set during pentathlon competition)	Ana Camila Pirelli	28 February 2010	Summit League Championships	Fargo, United States	
Pole vault						
Long jump	5.38 m	Ana Camila Pirelli	6 February 2009		Joplin, United States	
Triple jump						
Shot put	13.70 m (Note: record set during pentathlon competition)	Ana Camila Pirelli	27 January 2012	Jayhawk Classic	Lawrence, United States	
Pentathlon	3765 pts OT	Ana Camila Pirelli	27 January 2012	Jayhawk Classic	Lawrence, United States	
Pentathlon	60m H / High jump / Shot put / Long jump / 800m; 9.27 / 1.59 m / 13.70 m / 5.32 m / 2:24.36					
3000 m walk						
4 × 400 m relay						
