= Ederson Pereira =

Brazilian distance runner (born 1990)

Personal information
- Full name: Ederson Vilela Pereira
- Born: 6 June 1990 (age 36)

Sport
- Country: Brazil
- Sport: Athletics
- Event(s): 5000 metres, 10,000 metres

Achievements and titles
- Personal best(s): 5000 metres: 13:23.24; 10,000 metres: 28:27.47; Marathon: 2:13:15
Medal record
Pan American Games
Gold medal – first place	2019 Lima	10,000 m

Ederson Vilela Pereira (born 6 June 1990) is a Brazilian distance runner who competes in events from 1500 metres to the marathon. He was the gold medallist in the 10,000 metres at the 2019 Pan American Games. He has also won medals in the 5000 metres at the 2017 South American Championships in Athletics and the 3000 metres at the 2016 Ibero-American Championships in Athletics.

Pereira has represented his nation in cross country running four times at the World Athletics Cross Country Championships (2008, 2009, 2011, 2013) and shared in team titles with the Brazilian men at the South American Cross Country Championships in 2007, 2008, 2009, 2011, and 2013. He competed at the 2020 World Athletics Half Marathon Championships.

He holds personal bests of 13:23.24 minutes for the 5000 metres, 28:27.47 for the 10,000 metres and 2:13:15 hours for the marathon. He is a three-time national champion at the Troféu Brasil de Atletismo, winning in the 5000 m in 2013 and in the 10,000 metres in 2018 and 2019.

== International competitions ==
Representing Brazil
Year	Competition	Venue	Position	Event	Result	Notes
2006	South American Cross Country Championships	Mar del Plata, Argentina	12th	U18 race	13:00	
2007	South American Cross Country Championships	Rio de Janeiro, Brazil	2nd	U18 race	12:54	
2007	South American Cross Country Championships	Rio de Janeiro, Brazil	1st	U18 team	5 pts	
2008	South American Cross Country Championships	Asunción, Paraguay	3rd	U20 race	26:48	
2008	South American Cross Country Championships	Asunción, Paraguay	1st	U20 team	9 pts	
2008	World Cross Country Championships	Edinburgh, United Kingdom	100th	Junior race	26:25	
2008	World Cross Country Championships	Edinburgh, United Kingdom	13th	Junior team	299 pts	
2009	South American Cross Country Championships	Concepción, Chile	3rd	U20 race	25:42	
2009	South American Cross Country Championships	Concepción, Chile	1st	U20 team	9 pts	
2009	World Cross Country Championships	Amman, Jordan	61st	Junior race	26:17	
2009	South American Junior Championships	São Paulo, Brazil	4th	5000 m	14:51.82	
2009	South American Junior Championships	São Paulo, Brazil	2nd	10,000 m	31:20.38	Held in Pan American Junior race
2009	Pan American Junior Championships	Port of Spain, Trinidad and Tobago	5th	5000 m	14:24.48	
2009	Pan American Junior Championships	Port of Spain, Trinidad and Tobago	2nd	10,000 m	31:20.38	
2011	South American Cross Country Championships	Asunción, Paraguay	4th	Senior race	37:52	
2011	South American Cross Country Championships	Asunción, Paraguay	1st	Senior team	7 pts	
2011	World Cross Country Championships	Punta Umbría, Spain	88th	Senior race	37:55	
2011	World Cross Country Championships	Punta Umbría, Spain	17th	Senior team	326 pts	
2012	Ibero-American Championships	Barquisimeto, Venezuela	6th	3000 m	8:19.59	
2013	South American Cross Country Championships	Concordia, Argentina	6th	Senior race	41:43	
2013	South American Cross Country Championships	Concordia, Argentina	1st	Senior team	12 pts	
2013	World Cross Country Championships	Bydgoszcz, Poland	74th	Senior race	35:45	
2016	Ibero-American Championships	Rio de Janeiro, Brazil	3rd	3000 m	7:56.20	
2016	Ibero-American Championships	Rio de Janeiro, Brazil	—	5000 m	DNF	
2017	South American Championships	Luque, Paraguay	2nd	5000 m	13:59.20	
2017	South American Championships	Luque, Paraguay	4th	10,000 m	29:39.85	
2019	South American Championships	Lima, Peru	7th	5000 m	14:12.00	
2019	South American Championships	Lima, Peru	—	10,000 m	DNF	
2019	Pan American Games	Lima, Peru	7th	5000 m	13:58.72	
2019	Pan American Games	Lima, Peru	1st	10,000 m	28:27.47	PB
2020	World Half Marathon Championships	Gdynia, Poland	90th	Half marathon	1:04:19	
2020	World Half Marathon Championships	Gdynia, Poland	18th	Team	3:12:37	
2022	South American Indoor Championships	Cochabamba, Bolivia	2nd	3000 m	8:40.96	
2022	Ibero-American Championships	La Nucía, Spain	13th	5000 m	14:16.16	
2025	World Championships	Tokyo, Japan	63rd	Marathon	2:28:40	

== National titles ==
- Brazilian Athletics Championships
  - 5000 m: 2013
  - 10,000 m: 2018, 2019
