= 2008 South American Cross Country Championships =

- Organisers: CONSUDATLE
- Edition: 23rd
- Date: March 2
- Host city: Asunción, Paraguay
- Venue: Parque Ñu Guazú
- Events: 6
- Distances: 12 km – Senior men 8 km – Junior men (U20); 4 km – Youth men (U18); 8 km – Senior women 6 km – Junior women (U20); 3 km – Youth women (U18)
- Participation: 91 athletes from 7 nations

The 2008 South American Cross Country Championships took place on March 2, 2008. The races were held at the Parque Ñu Guazú in Asunción, Paraguay. A detailed report of the event was given for the IAAF.

Complete results and results for junior and youth competitions were published.

== Medallists ==
Event	Gold		Silver		Bronze	
Individual
Senior men (12 km)	Marilson Gomes dos Santos; Brazil	37:28	Jorge Cabrera; Paraguay	37:58	Giovanny Amador; Colombia	38:12
Junior (U20) men (8 km)	Gilberto Silvestre Lopes; Brazil	26:22	Derlis Ramón Ayala; Paraguay	26:30	Éderson Vilela Pereira; Brazil	26:48
Youth (U18) men (4 km)	Antonio Ribeiro Barbosa Filho; Brazil	12:29	René Champi (Peru) Perú	12:39	Miguel Angel Amador; Colombia	12:46
Senior women (8 km)	Inés Melchor (Peru) Perú	28:19	Zenaide Vieira; Brazil	28:51	Maria Zeferina Rodrigues Baldaia; Brazil	29:12
Junior (U20) women (6 km)	Yoni Ninahuamán (Peru) Perú	23:10	Rosario Romero (Peru) Perú	23:18	Yessica Huamán (Peru) Perú	23:37
Youth (U18) women (3 km)	Soledad Torre (Peru) Perú	10:37	Florencia Borelli; Argentina	10:49	Lucrecia Ortíz; Argentina	11:00
Team
Senior men	Brazil	15	Colombia	18	Venezuela	22
Junior (U20) men	Brazil	9	Argentina	23	Paraguay	25
Youth (U18) men	Brazil	5	Paraguay	13		
Senior women	Brazil	11	Argentina	25	Venezuela	32
Junior (U20) women	(Peru) Perú	6	Brazil	19	Argentina	22
Youth (U18) women	Argentina	5	(Peru) Perú	6	Paraguay	13

== Race results ==
=== Senior men's race (12 km) ===
Individual race
Rank	Athlete	Country	Time
1st place, gold medalist(s)	Marilson Gomes dos Santos	Brazil	37:28
2nd place, silver medalist(s)	Jorge Cabrera	Paraguay	37:58
3rd place, bronze medalist(s)	Giovanny Amador	Colombia	38:12
4	Cosme Anselmo de Souza	Brazil	38:32
5	José Cicero Eloy	Brazil	38:35
6	Jean Carlos Calzadilla	Venezuela	38:40
7	José Gregorio Peña	Venezuela	38:47
8	Herder Vásquez	Colombia	39:11
9	Jhon Tello	Colombia	39:13
10	Rolando Pillco	Bolivia	39:14
11	José Gutemberg Ferreira	Brazil	39:29
12	Robert Lugo	Venezuela	39:38
13	Matías Juan José Roth	Argentina	39:50
14	John Jairo Vargas	Colombia	40:09
15	Ulises Pedro Sanguinetti	Argentina	40:22
16	Didimo Armando Sánchez	Venezuela	41:13
17	Mauro Carrasco	Argentina	41:29
18	Roberto Carlos González	Paraguay	42:21
19	Gustavo Alberto López	Paraguay	42:33
20	Orlando Javier Elizeche	Paraguay	47:18
—	Roberto Carlos Balcedo	Argentina	DNF
—	Raúl Cardozo	Paraguay	DNF
—	Damiao Anselmo de Souza	Brazil	DNF
—	Oscar Robayo	Colombia	DNF

Teams
Rank	Team	Points
1st place, gold medalist(s)	Brazil: Marilson Gomes dos Santos / 1; Cosme Anselmo de Souza^{†} / 4 or (n/s); José Cicero Eloy^{†} / 4 or (n/s); José Gutemberg Ferreira / 10	15
2nd place, silver medalist(s)	Colombia: Giovanny Amador / 3; Herder Vásquez / 7; Jhon Tello / 8; (John Jairo Vargas) / (n/s); (Oscar Robayo) / (DNF)	18
3rd place, bronze medalist(s)	Venezuela: Jean Carlos Calzadilla / 5; José Gregorio Peña / 6; Robert Lugo / 11; (Didimo Armando Sánchez) / (n/s)	22
4	Paraguay: Jorge Cabrera / 2; Roberto Carlos González / 15; Gustavo Alberto López / 16; (Orlando Javier Elizeche) / (n/s); (Raúl Cardozo) / (DNF)	33
5	Argentina: Matías Juan José Roth / 12; Ulises Pedro Sanguinetti / 13; Mauro Carrasco / 14; (Roberto Carlos Balcedo) / (DNF)	39

- Note: Athletes in parentheses did not score for the team result.. (n/s: nonscorer)

^{†}: One of two athletes was a nonscorer.

=== Junior (U20) men's race (8 km) ===
Individual race
Rank	Athlete	Country	Time
1st place, gold medalist(s)	Gilberto Silvestre Lopes	Brazil	26:22
2nd place, silver medalist(s)	Derlis Ramón Ayala	Paraguay	26:30
3rd place, bronze medalist(s)	Éderson Vilela Pereira	Brazil	26:48
4	Luis Alberto Orta	Venezuela	27:13
5	José Marcio Leao da Silva	Brazil	27:16
6	Sergio Daniel Pérez	Argentina	27:27
7	Matías Martín Schiel	Argentina	27:42
8	Alexander Rojas	Colombia	28:00
9	Esteban Franco Quispe	(Peru) Perú	28:26
10	Joaquín Arbe	Argentina	28:30
11	Walter Corbalán	Argentina	29:10
12	Iván Guillermo González	Paraguay	29:33
13	Carlos Roberto Báez	Paraguay	31:09
14	José Francisco Bordón	Paraguay	31:11
15	Claudio Nicolás Gómez	Paraguay	33:00
—	Paulo Sergio dos Reis Carvalho	Brazil	DNF

Teams
Rank	Team	Points
1st place, gold medalist(s)	Brazil: Gilberto Silvestre Lopes / 1; Éderson Vilela Pereira / 3; José Marcio Leao da Silva / 5; (Paulo Sergio dos Reis Carvalho) / (DNF)	9
2nd place, silver medalist(s)	Argentina: Sergio Daniel Pérez / 6; Matías Martín Schiel / 7; Joaquín Arbe / 10; (Walter Corbalán) / (n/s)	23
3rd place, bronze medalist(s)	Paraguay: Derlis Ramón Ayala / 2; Iván Guillermo González / 11; Carlos Roberto Báez / 12; (José Francisco Bordón) / (n/s); (Claudio Nicolás Gómez) / (n/s)	25

- Note: Athletes in parentheses did not score for the team result. (n/s: nonscorer)

=== Youth (U18) men's race (4 km) ===
Individual race
Rank	Athlete	Country	Time
1st place, gold medalist(s)	Antonio Ribeiro Barbosa Filho	Brazil	12:29
2nd place, silver medalist(s)	René Champi	(Peru) Perú	12:39
3rd place, bronze medalist(s)	Miguel Angel Amador	Colombia	12:46
4	Cleiton Pedro Machado	Brazil	13:08
5	Evandro Maciel	Brazil	13:10
6	Jorge Burgos	Argentina	14:13
7	Carlos Alejandro González	Paraguay	14:39
8	Diego José Cabrera	Paraguay	14:45
9	Edulfo David Forcado	Paraguay	15:45

Teams
Rank
Team
Points

Brazil

Antonio Ribeiro Barbosa Filho	1
Cleiton Pedro Machado	4
(Evandro Maciel)	(n/s)

5

Paraguay

Carlos Alejandro González	6
Diego José Cabrera	7
(Edulfo David Forcado)	(n/s)

13

- Note: Athletes in parentheses did not score for the team result. (n/s: nonscorer)

=== Senior women's race (8 km) ===
Individual race
Rank	Athlete	Country	Time
1st place, gold medalist(s)	Inés Melchor	(Peru) Perú	28:19
2nd place, silver medalist(s)	Zenaide Vieira	Brazil	28:51
3rd place, bronze medalist(s)	Maria Zeferina Rodrigues Baldaia	Brazil	29:12
4	Nelbi Sánchez	Bolivia	29:12
5	Sandra Amarillo	Argentina	29:13
6	Isabel Cristina Feliciano da Silva	Brazil	29:38
7	Julia Rivera	(Peru) Perú	29:51
8	Nadia Rodríguez	Argentina	29:58
9	Yeisy Álvarez	Venezuela	30:16
10	Rosângela Raimunda Pereira Faria	Brazil	30:59
11	Zuleima Amaya	Venezuela	31:19
12	Rosa Elizabeth Ramos	Paraguay	31:26
13	Rosa Capurro	Argentina	31:30
14	Mileidys Jaimes	Venezuela	31:40
15	Andrea Latapie	Argentina	32:21
16	Carmen Patricia Martínez	Paraguay	34:15
17	María Verónica Domínguez	Paraguay	35:02
18	Cristina Ramona Ramos	Paraguay	36:57

Teams
Rank	Team	Points
1st place, gold medalist(s)	Brazil: Zenaide Vieira / 2; Maria Zeferina Rodrigues Baldaia / 3; Isabel Cristina Feliciano da Silva / 6; (Rosângela Raimunda Pereira Faria) / (n/s)	11
2nd place, silver medalist(s)	Argentina: Sandra Amarillo / 5; Nadia Rodríguez / 8; Rosa Capurro / 12; (Andrea Latapie) / (n/s)	25
3rd place, bronze medalist(s)	Venezuela: Yeisy Álvarez / 9; Zuleima Amaya / 10; Mileidys Jaimes / 13	32
4	Paraguay: Rosa Elizabeth Ramos / 11; Carmen Patricia Martínez / 14; María Verónica Domínguez / 15; (Cristina Ramona Ramos) / (n/s)	40

- Note: Athletes in parentheses did not score for the team result. (n/s: nonscorer)

=== Junior (U20) women's race (6 km) ===
Individual race
Rank	Athlete	Country	Time
1st place, gold medalist(s)	Yoni Ninahuamán	(Peru) Perú	23:10
2nd place, silver medalist(s)	Rosario Romero	(Peru) Perú	23:18
3rd place, bronze medalist(s)	Yessica Huamán	(Peru) Perú	23:37
4	Viviane Amorim Figueiredo	Brazil	24:02
5	Nadia Fernanda Aguilera Conceição	Brazil	24:42
6	Etelvina Bagolin	Argentina	25:00
7	Erika Gómez	Argentina	25:12
8	Angie Rocío Orjuela	Colombia	25:21
9	Gladis Rodríguez	Argentina	25:38
10	Marta Raquel Pino	Argentina	25:53
11	Poliana Oliveira Borges	Brazil	26:28
12	Fátima Viviane Romero	Paraguay	28:35
—	Damiana Batista Seles	Brazil	DNF

Teams
Rank	Team	Points
1st place, gold medalist(s)	(Peru) Perú: Yoni Ninahuamán / 1; Rosario Romero / 2; Yessica Huamán / 3	6
2nd place, silver medalist(s)	Brazil: Viviane Amorim Figueiredo / 4; Nadia Fernanda Aguilera Conceição / 5; Poliana Oliveira Borges / 10	19
3rd place, bronze medalist(s)	Argentina: Etelvina Bagolin / 6; Erika Gómez / 7; Gladis Rodríguez / 9; (Marta Raquel Pino) / (10); (Damiana Batista Seles) / (DNF)	22

- Note: Athletes in parentheses did not score for the team result. (n/s: nonscorer)

=== Youth (U18) women's race (3 km) ===
Individual race
Rank	Athlete	Country	Time
1st place, gold medalist(s)	Soledad Torre	(Peru) Perú	10:37
2nd place, silver medalist(s)	Florencia Borelli	Argentina	10:49
3rd place, bronze medalist(s)	Lucrecia Ortíz	Argentina	11:00
4	Juana Paniagua	Paraguay	11:18
5	Danitza Crisóstomo	(Peru) Perú	11:30
6	Jéssica Pelario Bueno	Brazil	11:33
7	Keila Cristina Rodrigues	Brazil	11:47
8	Diana Melo	Colombia	12:04
9	Valdilene dos Santos Silva	Brazil	12:08
10	Elena Victoria Fernández	Paraguay	12:34
11	Selva Florentin	Paraguay	12:47

Teams
Rank	Team	Points
1st place, gold medalist(s)	Argentina: Florencia Borelli / 2; Lucrecia Ortíz / 3	5
2nd place, silver medalist(s)	(Peru) Perú: Soledad Torre / 1; Danitza Crisóstomo / 5	6
3rd place, bronze medalist(s)	Paraguay: Juana Paniagua / 4; Elena Victoria Fernández / 9; (Selva Florentin) / (n/s)	13
4	Brazil: Jéssica Pelario Bueno / 6; Keila Cristina Rodrigues / 7; (Valdilene dos Santos Silva) / (n/s)	13

- Note: Athletes in parentheses did not score for the team result. (n/s: nonscorer)

== Medal table (unofficial) ==
* Host nation (Brazil)

Rank	Nation	Gold	Silver	Bronze	Total
1	Brazil*	7	2	2	11
2	Peru	4	3	1	8
3	Argentina	1	3	2	6
4	Paraguay	0	3	2	5
5	Colombia	0	1	2	3
6	Venezuela	0	0	2	2
Totals (6 entries)		12	12	11	35

- Note: Totals include both individual and team medals, with medals in the team competition counting as one medal.

== Participation ==
According to an unofficial count, 91 athletes from 7 countries participated. This is in agreement with the official numbers as published.

- Argentina (19)
- Bolivia (2)
- Brazil (23)
- Colombia (9)
- Paraguay (21)
- (Peru) Perú (9)
- Venezuela (8)

== See also ==
- 2008 in athletics (track and field)
