= Wilma Arizapana =

Peruvian long-distance runner (born 1982)

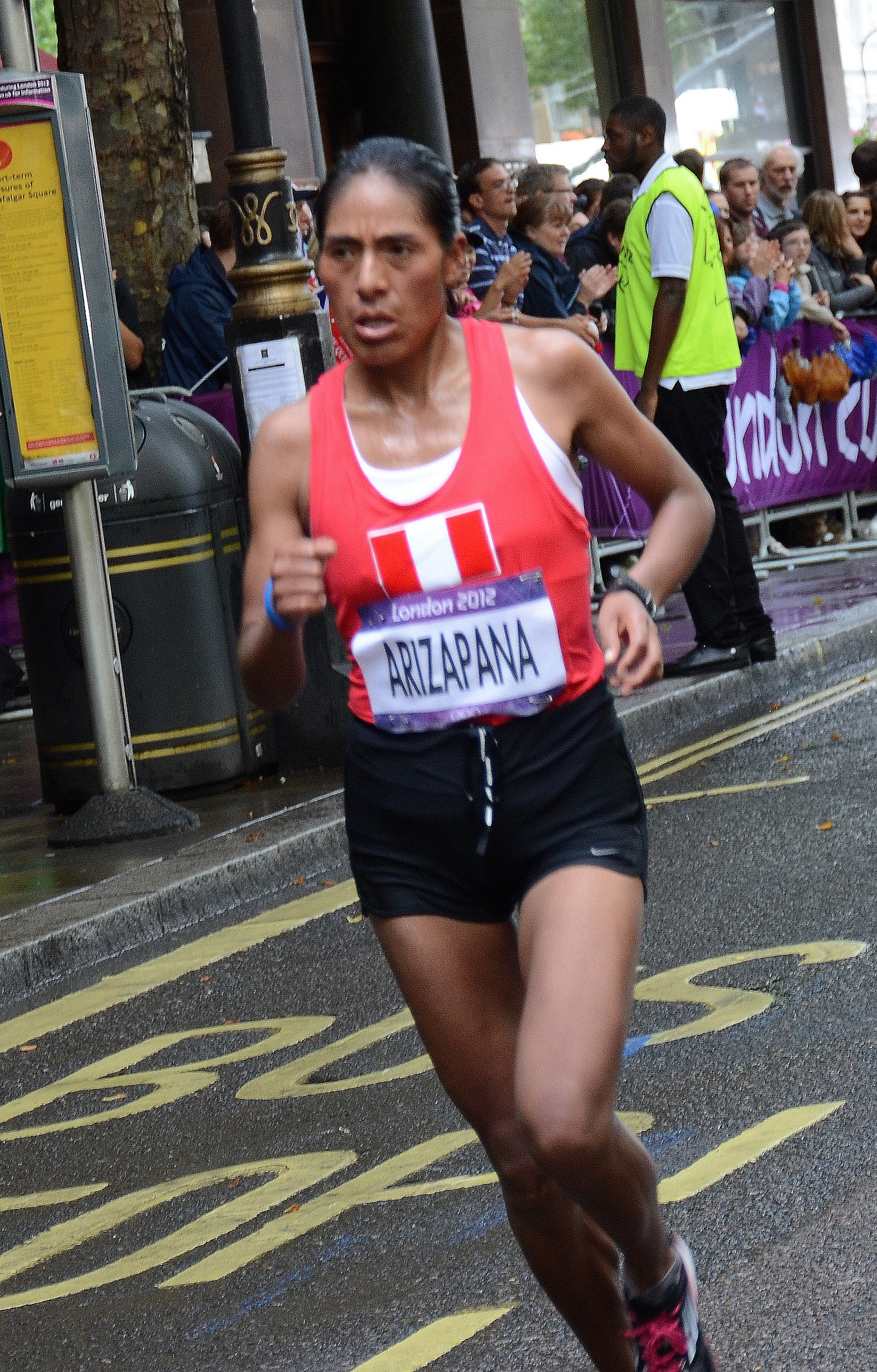
- Arizapana in the 2012 Summer Olympics marathon

Personal information
- Full name: Wilma Yanet Arizapana Yucra
- Born: 1 October 1982 (age 43) Chupa, Puno, Peru
- Height: 1.64 m (5 ft 4 1/2 in)
- Weight: 54 kg (119 lb)

Sport
- Country: Peru
- Sport: athletics
- Event: Long-distance running
- Updated on 8 May 2014

Wilma Yanet Arizapana Yucra (born 1 October 1982) is a Peruvian long-distance runner. She competed in the marathon at the 2012 Summer Olympics, placing 55th with a time of 2:35:09. She also won the bronze in the 2013 Bolivarian Games.

== Personal bests ==
- 1500 m: 4:23.20– Cartagena, Colombia, 5 July 2013
- 5000 m: 15:55.70 – Trujillo, Peru, 28 November 2013
- 10,000 m: 33:11.97 – Lima, Peru, 6 October 2013
- Half marathon: 1:12:25 – Lima, Peru, 1 September 2013
- Marathon: 2:34:11 – Rotterdam, Netherlands, 15 April 2012

== Achievements ==
Year	Competition	Venue	Position	Event	Notes
Representing Peru
2007	Pan American Games	Rio de Janeiro, Brazil	9th	5000 m	16:39.90
2008	Ibero-American Championships	Iquique, Chile	—	5000 m	DNS
2010	South American Cross Country Championships	Guayaquil, Ecuador	6th	8 km	28:02.0
2010	South American Half Marathon Championships	Lima, Peru	4th	Half marathon	1:15:15
2011	South American Cross Country Championships	Asunción, Paraguay	2nd	8 km	27:45.3
2011	South American Championships	Buenos Aires, Argentina	5th	5000 m	16:41.25
2011	Pan American Games	Guadalajara, Mexico	9th	5000 m	17:06.99
2012	Olympic Games	London, United Kingdom	55th	Marathon	2:35:09
2013	South American Championships	Cartagena, Colombia	9th	1500 m	4:30.90
2013	South American Championships	Cartagena, Colombia	3rd	5000 m	16:22.82
2013	Bolivarian Games	Trujillo, Peru	3rd	5000 m	15:55.70
2013	Bolivarian Games	Trujillo, Peru	2nd	10,000 m	33:55.5
2014	South American Games	Santiago, Chile	2nd	10,000 m	33:26.84
2015	World Cross Country Championships	Guiyang, China	31st	8 km	28:52
2015	World Cross Country Championships	Guiyang, China	8th	Team	156 pts
2015	South American Championships	Lima, Peru	3rd	10,000m	33:01.15
