= Derlis Ayala =

Paraguayan long-distance runner

Derlys Ayala
Personal information
- Full name: Derlis Ramón Ayala Sanchez
- Born: 7 January 1990 (age 36) Ciudad del Este, Paraguay
- Height: 1.80 m (5 ft 11 in)
- Weight: 68 kg (150 lb)

Sport
- Country: Paraguay
- Sport: long-distance running
- Events: 5000 m 10,000 m
- Club: Paraguay Marathon Club

Achievements and titles
- National finals: 1st 5000 m (2015)

Derlis Ramón Ayala Sanchez (born 7 January 1990), also known as Derlys Ayala, is a Paraguayan long-distance runner.

== Career ==
Born in Ciudad del Este, he represented Paraguay at the South American Cross Country Championships in 2008, 2011, 2013 and 2014.

He is a member of Paraguay Marathon Club in the Federación Paraguaya de Atletismo. He won a bronze medal at the 2009 Pan American Junior Athletics Championships. He holds Paraguayan national records in mile run, 5000 metres, 10,000 metres and several road running distances.

He represented Paraguay at the 2009 Pan American Junior Athletics Championships in the 3000 m steeplechase, winning a bonze medal with a time of 9:14.77.

He won the 2014 San Blas International Run in Ciudad del Este in 26:10 minutes.

At the 2014 South American Cross Country Championships, he finished in 22nd position of the Senior men's 12 km race event in a time of 42:02.61.

At the South American Athletics Grand Prix on 25 March 2015, he set a 10,000 m national record of 29:48.27 in Buenos Aires, Argentina.

Ayala then states "Athletics is my life. It's what takes me to many places, meet wonderful people. It does not matter the mode, the young people must practice any sport because that will maintain them far away from addictions, they'll be the best persons and they'll feel good and fill with pride their families."

=== 2016 Olympic Games ===
In April 2016, Ayala achieved his qualification for the 2016 Olympic Games in a marathon in Rotterdam. Ayala recorded a time of 2:17:27s to reach qualification. Ayala signalled that he worked for more than ten years just to achieve it and clarified that it was not easy. During the marathon at the Games, Ayala protagonized an emotive moment and gesture. Ayala stopped to help his friend from infancy Federico Bruno, who was injured, and going against his own time, Ayala stayed with Bruno to motivate him as they both crossed the finished line together.

"I know Fede since we were kids, we used to train together at the Villa. It does not matter, delay a bit my arrival [to the finish line], this is about the Olympic spirit"' – Ayala spoke in an interview transcribed by Paraguay Marathon Club

Ayala was placed as 136 in the world after completing the marathon in 2:39:40s.

=== 2017 South American Championships ===
In the 2017 South American Championships disputed in Luque, Ayala, who did not finish the 10, 000 metres, intended to earn a medal in the 5, 000 metres event, in which he concluded in 11th position, signalling that he was unhappy in an interview with Paraguayan news paper ABC Color. Ayala finished with a time of 15.00.30, in the event which Chilean athlete Victor Aravena finished in 1st place.

=== 2020 Olympic Games ===
In September 2019, Ayala qualified for the 2020 Summer Olympics with an A result time of 02.10.31s in the Buenos Aires Marathon, achieving a new national record for Paraguay and converting himself into South American champion. In the same month, Ayala visited Paraguay's president Mario Abdo Benítez, who promised Ayala help in his preparation for the Games in Tokyo. His scholarship with the Secretaria Nacional de Deportes was also improved.

== Competition record ==
=== International competitions ===
Year	Competition	Venue	Position	Event	Notes
Representing Paraguay
2008	South American Cross Country Championships	Asunción, Paraguay	2nd	Junior race	26:30
2009	Pan American Junior Championships	Port of Spain, Trinidad and Tobago	3rd	3000 m s'chase	9:14.77
2011	South American Cross Country Championships	Asunción, Paraguay	11th	Senior race	38:38.9
2013	South American Cross Country Championships	Concordia, Argentina	—	Senior race	DNF
2014	South American Cross Country Championships	Asunción, Paraguay	22nd	Senior race	42:02.61
2016	Olympic Games	Rio de Janeiro, Brazil	136th	Marathon	2:39:40
2017	South American Championships	Luque, Paraguay	11th	5000 m	15:00.30
2017	South American Championships	Luque, Paraguay	—	10,000 m	DNF
2017	Bolivarian Games	Santa Marta, Colombia	6th	Half marathon	1:08:42
2019	Pan American Games	Lima, Peru	5th	Marathon	2:12:54
2019	World Championships	Doha, Qatar	–	Marathon	DNF
2021	Olympic Games	Sapporo, Japan	43rd	Marathon	2:18:34
2022	Bolivarian Games	Valledupar, Colombia	9th	5000 m	14:56.30
2022	Bolivarian Games	Valledupar, Colombia	–	10,000 m	DNF
2022	Bolivarian Games	Valledupar, Colombia	6th	Half marathon	1:10:49
2022	South American Games	Asunción, Paraguay	2nd	Marathon	2:17:13
2023	World Championships	Budapest, Hungary	–	Marathon	DNF
2023	Pan American Games	Santiago, Chile	10th	Marathon	2:22:29

=== National championships ===
Year	Competition	Venue	Position	Event	Notes
2015	FPA Campeonato Nacional de Mayores	Asunción, Paraguay	1st	5000 m	14:51.13
2015	2015 Paraguayan Athletics Championships	Asunción, Paraguay	1st	800 m	1:59.68
2015	2015 Paraguayan Athletics Championships	Asunción, Paraguay	1st	1500 m	4:07.60
2015	2015 Paraguayan Athletics Championships	Asunción, Paraguay	1st	5000 m	15:10.04
2015	Paraguayan National Cross Country Championships	Luque, Paraguay	2nd	Senior race	42:51.07

=== Circuit performances ===
Year	Competition	Venue	Position	Event	Notes
2015	South American Grand Prix	Buenos Aires, Argentina	1st	10000 m	29:48.27 NR
