= Santiago Sasiaín =

Paraguayan athlete (born 1996)

Santiago Luis Sasiaín González (born May 28, 1996) is a Paraguayan athlete who holds the record of Hammer throw with 56.58 m. (7.26 kg). He plays with the athletics club Sol de América.
