= South American Half Marathon Championships =

Road running competition

- Sport: Half marathon
- Founded: 1995
- Continent: South America (CONSUDATLE)

The South American Half Marathon Championships (Spanish: Campeonatos Sudamericanos de Media Maratón) is an annual Road running competition organized by CONSUDATLE for athletes representing the countries of its member associations. The event was established in 1995.

== Editions ==
	Year	City	Country	Date
I	1995	Neiva, Huila	Colombia	June 3
II	1996	Manaus, Amazonas	Brazil	August 31
III	1997	Georgetown	Guyana	September 7
IV	1998	Rio de Janeiro	Brazil	August 23
V	2002	Buenos Aires	Argentina	September 8
VI	2004	Maracaibo, Zulia	Venezuela	September 4
VII	2008	Rio de Janeiro	Brazil	October 12
VIII	2009	Asunción	Paraguay	August 2
IX	2010	Lima	Peru	August 29
X	2011	Buenos Aires	Argentina	September 11
XI	2012	Asunción	Paraguay	August 26
XII	2014	Asunción	Paraguay	May 11
XIII	2015	Montevideo	Uruguay	April 26
XIV	2017	Montevideo	Uruguay	March 18
XV	2018	Paramaribo	Suriname	August 5
XVI	2019	Asunción	Paraguay	August 25
XVII	2022	Buenos Aires	Argentina	August 21

== Results ==
The winners were published. The 2008 results were extracted from the 2008 IAAF World Half Marathon Championships. Further results were compiled from various sources.

=== Men ===
Year	Gold		Silver		Bronze	
1995	Hérder Vásquez (COL)	1:05:07	Pedro Elías Ortiz (COL)	1:05:57	Pedro César Rojas (COL)	1:06:04
1996	André Luiz Ramos (BRA)	1:04:23	Delmir dos Santos (BRA)	1:06:54	Vanderlei Cordeiro (BRA)	1:06:59
1997	Milton Mattos (BRA)	1:09:30	Milton Mattos (VEN)	1:09:54	Paulo Víctor Lunkess (BRA)	1:09:55
1998	Ronaldo da Costa (BRA)	1:02:17	Antonio Silio (ARG)	1:02:31	Eduardo do Nascimento (BRA)	1:02:41
2002	Herman Óscar Cortínez (ARG)	1:05:40	Miguel Meléndez (CHI)	1:05:54	Polibio Méndez (ECU)	1:06:04
2004	Lervis Arias (VEN)	1:06:30	José Alejandro Semprún (VEN)	1:07:10	Robert Lugo (VEN)	1:07:34
2008	Marílson Gomes dos Santos (BRA)	1:03:18	Pedro Mora (VEN)	1:04:45	Giomar da Silva (BRA)	1:05:07
2009	Clodoaldo Gomes da Silva (BRA)	1:04:09	Constantino León (PER)	1:04:46	Edmundo Torres (PER)	1:05:24
2010	Jhon Cusi (PER)	1:03:12	Jaime Caldúa (PER)	1:03:23	Constantino León (PER)	1:03:53
2011	Marílson Gomes dos Santos (BRA)	1:01:13	Luis Ariel Molina (ARG)	1:05:52	Juan Carlos Hernández (COL)	1:06:15
2012	Flavio Henrique Guimarães (BRA)	1:08:23	Pablo Mena (CHI)	1:09:29	Derlis Ayala (PAR)	1:10:00
2014	Bayron Piedra (ECU)	1:09:24	Manuel Cañar (ECU)	1:10:02	Gustavo Narváez (ECU)	1:10:09
2015	Gilmar Silvestre Lopes (BRA)	1:05:43	Miguel Mallma (PER)	1:07:05	David Rodríguez (ARG)	1:07:11
2017	Damião de Souza (BRA)	1:05:53	Martín Cuestas (URU)	1:06:02	Nicolás Cuestas (URU)	1:06:06
2018	José Luis Rojas (PER)	1:08:39	Jianpierre Castro (PER)	1:09:47	Samuel Souza do Nascimento (BRA)	1:13:13
2019	Nicolás Cuestas (URU)	1:05:09	Silvestre López (URU)	1:05:20	Derlis Ayala (PAR)	1:05:36
2022	Christian Vasconez (ECU)	1:01:59	Federico Bruno (ARG)	1:02:10	Ignacio Erario (ARG)	1:02:12

=== Women ===
Year	Gold		Silver		Bronze	
1995	Iglandini González (COL)	1:17:28	Stella Castro (COL)	1:19:01	Flor Venegas (CHI)	1:19:29
1996	Flor Venegas (CHI)	1:24:00	Iracima Reis (BRA)	1:24:01	Itamar Aranha (CHI)	1:26:40
1997	Selma Cândida dos Reis (BRA)	1:22:59	Marlene María Flores (CHI)	1:24:05	Iara da Silva (BRA)	1:28:31
1998	Martha Tenorio (ECU)	1:11:40	Márcia Narloch (BRA)	1:14:37	Viviany de Oliveira (BRA)	1:15:14
2002	Érika Alejandra Olivera (CHI)	1:14:51	Sandra Torres (ARG)	1:17:37	Estela Martínez (ARG)	1:20:46
2004	Rosa America Rodríguez (VEN)	1:18:46	Norelis Lugo (VEN)	1:21:07	Mónica Sarmiento (VEN)	1:24:36
2008	Maria Zeferina Baldaia (BRA)	1:13:42	Rosa Godoy (ARG)	1:15:31	Marizete dos Santos (BRA)	1:17:04
2009	Jemena Misayauri (PER)	1:14:38	Julia Rivera (PER)	1:15:37	Marizete dos Santos (BRA)	1:15:59
2010	Jemena Misayauri (PER)	1:13:32	Gladys Tejeda (PER)	1:13:53	Michele das Chagas (BRA)	1:14:36
2011	Adriana Aparecida da Silva (BRA)	1:13:16	Rosalba Chacha (ECU)	1:13:45	Sandra Amarillo (ARG)	1:13:50
2012	Adriana Aparecida da Silva (BRA)	1:17:50	Fátima Romero (PAR)	1:25:24	Carmen Warkentin (PAR)	1:25:38
2014	Carmen Martínez (PAR)	1:16:35	Rosa Chacha (ECU)	1:19:47	Lorena Velázquez (ECU)	1:20:03
2015	Rocío Cantará (PER)	1:16:26	Adriana Aparecida da Silva (BRA)	1:16:36	Nicolasa Condori (PER)	1:16:58
2017	Clara Canchanya (PER)	1:15:39	Valdilene Silva (BRA)	1:15:53	Rocío Cantará (PER)	1:15:56
2018	Talía Valdivia (PER)	1:20:21	Nélida Sullca (PER)	1:20:50	Nicolasa Condori (PER)	1:24:31
2019	Daiana Ocampo (ARG)	1:13:23	Carmen Martínez (PAR)	1:15:21	Clara Canchanya (PER)	1:16:06
2022	Florencia Borelli (ARG)	1:09:31	Diana Ocampo (ARG)	1:09:46	Rosa Chacha (ECU)	1:11:23

== Medal table ==
Rank	Nation	Gold	Silver	Bronze	Total
1	Brazil	13	5	10	28
2	Peru	7	7	6	20
3	Argentina	3	6	4	13
4	Ecuador	3	3	4	10
5	Venezuela	2	4	2	8
6	Chile	2	3	2	7
7	Colombia	2	2	2	6
8	Paraguay	1	2	3	6
9	Uruguay	1	2	1	4
Totals (9 entries)		34	34	34	102

== See also ==
- IAAF World Half Marathon Championships
