= South American Marathon Championships =

Annual road running competition

- Sport: Marathon
- Founded: 1994
- Continent: South America (CONSUDATLE)

The South American Marathon Championships (Spanish: Campeonatos Sudamericanos de Maratón) is an annual road running competition organized by CONSUDATLE for athletes representing the countries of its member associations.

The event was established in 1994 as South American Marathon Cup (Copa Sudamericana de Maratón) following its removal from the main South American Championship programme after 1991. Discontinued after 2002, the event was reestablished under the current name in 2009.

== Editions ==
	Year	City	Country	Date
I	1994	Brasília	Brazil	April 21
II	1995	Georgetown	Guyana	April 23
III	1996	Brasília	Brazil	April 21
IV	1997	São Paulo	Brazil	June 1
V	1998	Villavicencio, Meta	Colombia	March 29
VI	1999	Porto Alegre, Rio Grande do Sul	Brazil	May 16
VII	2000	São Paulo	Brazil	June 11
VIII	2001	São Paulo	Brazil	July 8
IX	2002	São Paulo	Brazil	July 14
X	2009	Buenos Aires	Argentina	October 11
XI	2010	Asunción	Paraguay	August 8
XII	2011	Lima	Peru	May 15
XIII	2012	Caracas	Venezuela	February 26
XIV	2013	Buenos Aires	Argentina	October 13
XV	2014	Santiago	Chile	April 6
XVI	2015	Asunción	Paraguay	August 9
XVII	2016	Montevideo	Uruguay	April 10
XVIII	2019	Buenos Aires	Argentina	September 22

== Results ==
=== Men ===
Year	Gold		Silver		Bronze	
1994	Luiz Carlos da Silva; Brazil	2:22:02	Roberto P. Dias; Brazil	2:23:03	Neilor José Pazin; Brazil	2:26:04
1995^{1.)}	Oswald Adams; Guyana	2:43:40	Clifton Thorn; Guyana	2:45:30	Rubén Coria; Argentina	2:49:30
1996	Neilor José Pazin; Brazil	2:23:12	Lindemberg Gomes Nunes; Brazil	2:24:14	Luiz Carlos Santos Ramos; Brazil	2:25:14
1997^{2.)}	Diamantino Silveira dos Santos; Brazil	2:17:11	Daniel Lopes Ferreira; Brazil	2:18:13	Luiz Carlos da Silva; Brazil	2:18:24
1998	William Ramírez; Colombia	2:23:17	Julio Hernández; Colombia	2:25:19	Juan Paniagua; Colombia	2:25:26
1999	Arnaldo Sales de Sá; Brazil	2:16:42	Uilia Pires Santos; Brazil	2:19:10	Francismar de Barros Dias; Brazil	2:19:47
2000^{3.)}	Alex Januário de Mendonça; Brazil	2:16:37	Genilson Junior da Silva; Brazil	2:17:30	Diamantino Silveira dos Santos; Brazil	2:17:57
2001^{4.)}	Rômulo Wagner da Silva; Brazil	2:15:11	Manoel de Jesus Teixeira; Brazil	2:17:51	José Telles de Souza; Brazil	2:18:39
2002^{5.)}	Vanderlei Cordeiro de Lima; Brazil	2:11:19	Diamantino Silveira dos Santos; Brazil	2:16:43	José Telles de Souza; Brazil	2:17:29
2009	Marco Antônio Pereira; Brazil	2:17:56	Hernán Oscar Cortínez; Argentina	2:20:06	José Ramón Romero; Argentina	2:23:23
2010	Elias Rodrigues Bastos; Brazil	2:27:51	Paulo da Silva; Brazil	2:28:04	Gustavo López; Paraguay	2:33:18
2011	Miguel Mallqui; Peru	2:17:10	Marco Antônio Pereira; Brazil	2:19:40	José David Cardona; Colombia	2:25:17
2012	Juan David Cardona; Colombia	2:19:18	José Everaldo da Silva Mota; Brazil	2:24:22	Eduardo Aruquipa; Bolivia	2:26:06
2013^{6.)}	Eliezer de Jesus Santos; Brazil	2:19:04	Darío Rios; Argentina	2:20:56	Osvaldo Barreto; Argentina	2:32:26
2014^{7.)}	Roberto Echeverría; Chile	2:16:58	Marcos Alexandre Elias; Brazil	2:20:29	Eugenio Galaz; Chile	2:20:35
2015	Juan Huamán; Peru	2:28:23	Marcos Alexandre Elias; Brazil	2:30:26	Renilto dos Santos Batista; Brazil	2:32:05

^{1.)}: In 1995, the race was won by Adalbert Browne from Barbados in 2:33:06 hrs, Victor Ledgers from Saint Lucia was 2nd in 2:42:30 hrs, both athletes running as guests.
^{2.)}: In 1997, the race was won by Kipkemboi Cheruiyot from Kenya in 2:17:09 hrs, Andrei Kuznetsov from Russia was 3rd in 2:17:56 hrs, both athletes running as guests.
^{3.)}: In 2000, the race was won by David Ngetich from Kenya in 2:15:21 hrs, Paul Yego from Kenya was 3rd in 2:17:23 hrs, both athletes running as guests.
^{4.)}: In 2001, Stephen Rugat from Kenya was 1st in 2:14:30 hrs, Eric Kimaiyo from Kenya was 2nd in 2:14:31 hrs, and William Musyocki from Kenya was 3rd in 2:15:05 hrs, all three athletes running as guests.
^{5.)}: In 2002, Elijah Korir from Kenya was 2nd in 2:15:26 hrs, and Joseph Kamau from Kenya was 4th in 2:17:07 hrs, both athletes running as guests.
^{6.)}: In 2013, Julius Karinga from Kenya was 1st in 2:11:02 hrs, Eric Nzioki from Kenya was 2nd in 2:16:28 hrs, and Henry Cherono from Kenya was 3rd in 2:17:10 hrs, all three athletes running as guests.
^{7.)}: In 2014, Beraki Beyene from Eritrea was 1st in 2:11:50, Simon Kariuki from Ethiopia was 2nd in 2:12:11, Julius Karinga from Kenya was 3rd in 2:13:38, Michael Chege from Kenya was 4th in 2:15:21, Julius Keter from Kenya was 5th in 2:15:52, and Ali Abdosh from Ethiopia was 6th in 2:16:13, all running as guests.

=== Women ===
Year	Gold		Silver		Bronze	
1994	Solange Cordeiro de Souza; Brazil	2:56:19	Lidia Karwowski; Brazil	2:57:21	Maria Venancio; Brazil	2:58:32
1995	Rita Medeiros da Silva; Brazil	3:07:06	Iara Cristina Silva; Brazil	3:13:10	Reonna Cornette; Guyana	3:33:40
1996	Berenice Dias de Meire; Brazil	2:49:19	Maria Venancio; Brazil	2:52:56	Luciene Soares de Deus; Brazil	2:54:52
1997	Viviany Anderson de Oliveira; Brazil	2:42:13	Márcia Narloch; Brazil	2:43:02	Lidia Karwowski; Brazil	2:44:43
1998	María Isabel Trujillo; Colombia	2:55:01	Rosa Rivera; Colombia	2:57:18	Luz Marina Cortés; Colombia	3:12:19
1999	Márcia Narloch; Brazil	2:40:15	Alina Karwowski; Brazil	2:45:19	Maria Sandra Pereira da Silva; Brazil	2:45:32
2000^{1.)}	Márcia Narloch; Brazil	2:40:15	Lidia Karwowski; Brazil	2:45:41	Cleusa Maria Irineu; Brazil	2:47:35
2001	Marizete de Paula Rezende; Brazil	2:38:57	Maria Zeferina Rodrigues Baldaia; Brazil	2:39:33	Marlene Teixeira dos Santos; Brazil	2:41:20
2002	Maria Zeferina Rodrigues Baldaia; Brazil	2:36:07	Márcia Narloch; Brazil	2:37:20	Érika Olivera; Chile	2:38:11
2009	Sirlene Sousa de Pinho; Brazil	2:38:08	Natalia Romero; Chile	2:44:31	Andrea Graciano; Argentina	2:46:00
2010	María Gabriela Almada; Argentina	2:55:02	Janete Gomes Barbosa; Brazil	2:56:48	Leone Justino da Silva; Brazil	3:09:51
2011	Jimena Misayauri; Peru	2:42:40	Sandra Mercedes Ruales; Ecuador	2:48:01	Mary Emanuella da Costa Oliveira; Brazil	2:54:29
2012	Conceição de Maria Carvalho Oliveira; Brazil	2:53:15	Ruby Riátiva; Colombia	2:53:22	Ana Joaquina Rondón; Colombia	2:55:04
2013^{2.)}	Rosa Chacha; Ecuador	2:42:57	Karina Neipán; Argentina	2:46:47	Laura Bazallo; Uruguay	2:49:53
2014^{3.)}	Érika Olivera; Chile	2:36:08	Carmen Martínez; Paraguay	2:38:05	Hortencia Arzapalo; Peru	2:42:12
2015	Wilma Arizapana; Peru	2:50:39	Gladys Machacuay; Peru	2:51:13	Antonia Bernardete Lins da Silva; Brazil	2:58:37

^{1.)}: In 2000, Nora Maragaf from Kenya was 2nd in 2:44:09 hrs, and Violetta Kryza from Poland was 3rd in 2:44:28 hrs, both athletes running as guests.
^{2.)}: In 2013, Lucy Karimi from Kenya was 1st in 2:34:32 hrs, and Emily Chepkorir from Kenya was 2nd in 2:38:46 hrs, both athletes running as guests.
^{3.)}: In 2014, Emily Chepkorir from Kenya was 1st in 2:35:15, Alene Shewarge from Ethiopia was 2nd in 2:35:30, and Lucy Karimi from Kenya was 3rd in 2:35:39, all running as guests.
