= 2015 Paraguayan Athletics Championships =

- Dates: September 25–27
- Host city: Asunción, Paraguay
- Venue: Secretaria Nacional de Deportes
- Level: Open
- Type: Outdoor

The 2015 Campeonato de la Victoria or 2015 Torneo de la Victoria was held at the Secretaria Nacional de Deportes in Asunción, organized by Federación Paraguaya de Atletismo. It was the 65th edition.

The competition serves as the Paraguayan Athletics Championships in track and field for the Republic of Paraguay, being the country's most important national athletics competitions.

Paraguay Marathon Club was crowned champion of the championships, where it achieved a score of 139. Larson Giovanni Diaz Martinez and María Caballero were the best athletes of the championships.

== Results ==
- Results of the competition were published on the official website of the Federación Paraguaya de Atletismo.

=== Men's ===
==== High jump ====
| Rank | Athlete | Department | 1 | 2 | 3 | 4 | 5 | 6 | Result | Notes |
|---|---|---|---|---|---|---|---|---|---|---|
| 1st place, gold medalist(s) | David Ojeda Cesar | Central | | | | | | | 1.75 | |
| 2nd place, silver medalist(s) | Cristhian Catalino Ibarra Otazu | Paraguaríl | | | | | | | 1.60 | |
| 3rd place, bronze medalist(s) | Jose Luis Duarte Aquino | Central | | | | | | | 1.55 | |

==== Long jump ====
| Rank | Athlete | Department | 1 | 2 | 3 | 4 | 5 | 6 | Result | Notes |
|---|---|---|---|---|---|---|---|---|---|---|
| 1st place, gold medalist(s) | Christopher Josue Ortiz Gonzalez | Caaguazú | | | | | | | 6.33 (+1.5) | |
| 2nd place, silver medalist(s) | Jose Luis Duarte Aquino | Central | | | | | | | 6.12 (+0.9) | |
| 3rd place, bronze medalist(s) | Cristhian Catalino Ibarra Otazu | Paraguarí | | | | | | | 6.11 (+2.1) | |

==== Triple jump ====
| Rank | Athlete | Department | 1 | 2 | 3 | 4 | 5 | 6 | Result | Notes |
|---|---|---|---|---|---|---|---|---|---|---|
| 1st place, gold medalist(s) | Walter Fabian Ferreira Maciel | Central | | | | | | | 12.71 (+0.4) | |
| 2nd place, silver medalist(s) | Cristhian Catalino Ibarra Otazu | Paraguarí | | | | | | | 12.23 (+0.2) | |

==== Shot put throw ====
| Rank | Athlete | Department | 1 | 2 | 3 | 4 | 5 | 6 | Result | Notes |
|---|---|---|---|---|---|---|---|---|---|---|
| 1st place, gold medalist(s) | Larson Giovanni Diaz Martinez | Misiones | | | | | | | 12.81 | |
| 2nd place, silver medalist(s) | Pablo Augusto Bareiro Acuña | Misiones | | | | | | | 12.20 | |
| 3rd place, bronze medalist(s) | Ivan Daniel Diaz Martinez | Central | | | | | | | 09.60 | |

==== Discus throw ====
| Rank | Athlete | Department | 1 | 2 | 3 | 4 | 5 | 6 | Result | Notes |
|---|---|---|---|---|---|---|---|---|---|---|
| 1st place, gold medalist(s) | Pablo Augusto Bareiro Acuña | Misiones | | | | | | | 31.90 | |
| 2nd place, silver medalist(s) | Santiago Luis Sasiain Gonzalez | Central | | | | | | | 31.79 | |
| 3rd place, bronze medalist(s) | Juan Ernesto Motte Lezcano | Central | | | | | | | 21.86 | |

==== Javelin throw ====
| Rank | Athlete | Department | 1 | 2 | 3 | 4 | 5 | 6 | Result | Notes |
|---|---|---|---|---|---|---|---|---|---|---|
| 1st place, gold medalist(s) | Larson Giovanni Diaz Martinez | Misiones | | | | | | | 75.57PB | |
| 2nd place, silver medalist(s) | Victor Abel Fatecha Riveros | Cordillera | | | | | | | 75.40 | |
| 3rd place, bronze medalist(s) | Nicolas Augusto Gonzalez Rodriguez | Central | | | | | | | 52.00 | |

==== Hammer throw ====
| Rank | Athlete | Department | 1 | 2 | 3 | 4 | 5 | 6 | Result | Notes |
|---|---|---|---|---|---|---|---|---|---|---|
| 1st place, gold medalist(s) | Santiago Luis Sasiain Gonzalez | Central | | | | | | | 56.58NR | |
| 2nd place, silver medalist(s) | Jesus Antonio Sanchez Servin | Central | | | | | | | 51.47 | |
| 3rd place, bronze medalist(s) | Silvio Cesar Ovelar Barrios | Central | | | | | | | 49.35 | |

=== Women's ===
==== High jump ====
| Rank | Athlete | Department | 1 | 2 | 3 | 4 | 5 | 6 | Result | Notes |
|---|---|---|---|---|---|---|---|---|---|---|
| 1st place, gold medalist(s) | Lizel Daniela Gomez Ybarrola | Central | | | | | | | 1.45 | |

==== Long jump ====
| Rank | Athlete | Department | 1 | 2 | 3 | 4 | 5 | 6 | Result | Notes |
|---|---|---|---|---|---|---|---|---|---|---|
| 1st place, gold medalist(s) | Fatima Denisse Amarilla Gaona | Central | | | | | | | 5.36 (+1.3) | |
| 2nd place, silver medalist(s) | Lizel Daniela Gomez Ybarrola | Central | | | | | | | 5.23 (+2.3) | |
| 3rd place, bronze medalist(s) | Adriana Concepcion Araujo Benitez | Itapúa | | | | | | | 4.73 (+1.6) | |

==== Triple jump ====
| Rank | Athlete | Department | 1 | 2 | 3 | 4 | 5 | 6 | Result | Notes |
|---|---|---|---|---|---|---|---|---|---|---|
| 1st place, gold medalist(s) | Lizel Daniela Gomez Ybarrola | Central | | | | | | | 12.26 (+3.2) | |
| 2nd place, silver medalist(s) | Catalina Amarilla Vargas | Central | | | | | | | 10.55 (+1.9) | |
| 3rd place, bronze medalist(s) | Mia Shakira Romero Miltos | Central | | | | | | | 10.35 (+2.6) | |
| 4 | Adriana Concepcion Araujo Benitez | Itapúa | | | | | | | 10.07 (+2.5) | |

==== Shot put throw ====
| Rank | Athlete | Department | 1 | 2 | 3 | 4 | 5 | 6 | Result | Notes |
|---|---|---|---|---|---|---|---|---|---|---|
| 1st place, gold medalist(s) | Anna Camila Donatella Pirelli Cubas | Misiones | | | | | | | 12.62 | |
| 2nd place, silver medalist(s) | Andrea Gisella Bordon Mancuello | Paraguarí | | | | | | | 10.44 | |
| 3rd place, bronze medalist(s) | Clara Lucero Anahi Britos Paredez | Guairá | | | | | | | 06.67 | |

==== Discus throw ====
| Rank | Athlete | Department | 1 | 2 | 3 | 4 | 5 | 6 | Result | Notes |
|---|---|---|---|---|---|---|---|---|---|---|
| 1st place, gold medalist(s) | Andrea Gisella Bordon Mancuello | Paraguarí | | | | | | | 36.00 | |
| 2nd place, silver medalist(s) | Noelia Asucena Caceres Ortega | Central | | | | | | | 26.54 | |

==== Javelin throw ====
| Rank | Athlete | Department | 1 | 2 | 3 | 4 | 5 | 6 | Result | Notes |
|---|---|---|---|---|---|---|---|---|---|---|
| 1st place, gold medalist(s) | Laura Melissa Paredes Meza | Central | | | | | | | 48.97 | |
| 2nd place, silver medalist(s) | Lea Del Valle Galeano | Paraguarí | | | | | | | 23.52 | |

==== Hammer throw ====
| Rank | Athlete | Department | 1 | 2 | 3 | 4 | 5 | 6 | Result | Notes |
|---|---|---|---|---|---|---|---|---|---|---|
| 1st place, gold medalist(s) | Noelia Asucena Caceres Ortega | Central | | | | | | | 50.55 | |
| 2nd place, silver medalist(s) | Rosa Maria Ramirez Britos | Central | | | | | | | 34.12 | |

== See also ==
- Sport in Paraguay
- Paraguayan Olympic Committee
- Paraguayan Athletics Federation
- Paraguayan records in athletics
- List of athletics clubs in Paraguay
