= Martín Cuestas =

Uruguayan long-distance runner (born 1986)

Personal information
- Full name: Martín Esteban Cuestas Cardozo
- Born: 8 December 1986 (age 39)

Sport
- Sport: Track and field
- Event(s): Marathon, half marathon

Achievements and titles
- Personal best(s): Marathon: 2:16'42; Half marathon: 1:05'49

Martín Esteban Cuestas Cardozo (born 8 December 1986) is a Uruguayan long-distance runner who specialises in the marathon. He competed in the men's marathon event at the 2016 Summer Olympics.

His twin brother Nicolás also specialises in marathon.

== International competitions ==
Year	Competition	Venue	Position	Event	Notes
Representing Uruguay
2009	South American Championships	Lima, Peru	–	5000 m	DNF
2011	South American Championships	Buenos Aires, Argentina	11th	5000 m	14:42.75
2013	South American Championships	Cartagena, Colombia	9th	5000 m	14:44.62
2013	South American Championships	Cartagena, Colombia	8th	10,000 m	32:26.63
2014	World Half Marathon Championships	Copenhagen, Denmark	92nd	Half marathon	1:08:12
2015	South American Championships	Lima, Peru	11th	10,000 m	32:36.40
2016	Ibero-American Championships	Rio de Janeiro, Brazil	4th	10,000 m	13:59.53
2016	Olympic Games	Rio de Janeiro, Brazil	109th	Marathon	2:28:10
2017	South American Half Marathon Championships	Montevideo, Uruguay	2nd	Half marathon	1:06:02
2017	South American Championships	Asunción, Paraguay	6th	5000 m	14:28.61
2021	South American Championships	Guayaquil, Ecuador	3rd	10,000 m	29:47.82
2022	Ibero-American Championships	La Nucía, Spain	15th	10,000 m	14:33.01
2023	South American Championships	São Paulo, Brazil	6th	5000 m	14:18.51
2023	South American Championships	São Paulo, Brazil	7th	10,000 m	30:04.90
2025	South American Championships	Mar del Plata, Argentina	6th	10,000 m	30:30.41
2026	South American Indoor Championships	Cochabamba, Bolivia	6th	5000 m	8:59.96
2026	Ibero-American Championships	Lima, Peru	13th	5000 m	15:02.55
2026	Ibero-American Championships	Lima, Peru	10th	10,000 m	31:11.93
