= Nicolás Cuestas =

Uruguayan long-distance runner (born 1986)

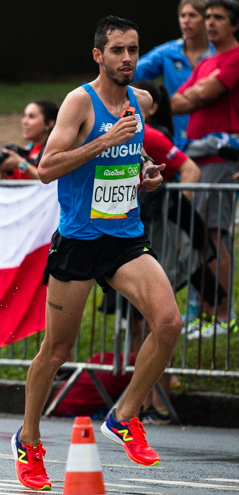
- Cuestas at the 2016 Olympics

Personal information
- Full name: Ronal Nicolás Cuestas Cardozo
- Born: 8 December 1986 (age 39)

Sport
- Sport: Track and field
- Event(s): Marathon, half marathon

Achievements and titles
- Personal best(s): Marathon: 2:13'30; Half marathon: 1:03'34

Ronal Nicolás Cuestas Cardozo (born 8 December 1986) is a Uruguayan long-distance runner who specialises in the marathon. He competed in the men's marathon event at the 2016 Summer Olympics. In 2019, he competed in the men's marathon at the 2019 World Athletics Championships held in Doha, Qatar. He finished in 55th place. In 2020, he competed in the men's race at the 2020 World Athletics Half Marathon Championships held in Gdynia, Poland.

His twin brother Martín also specialises in marathon.
