= Carmen Martínez (athlete) =

Paraguayan athlete

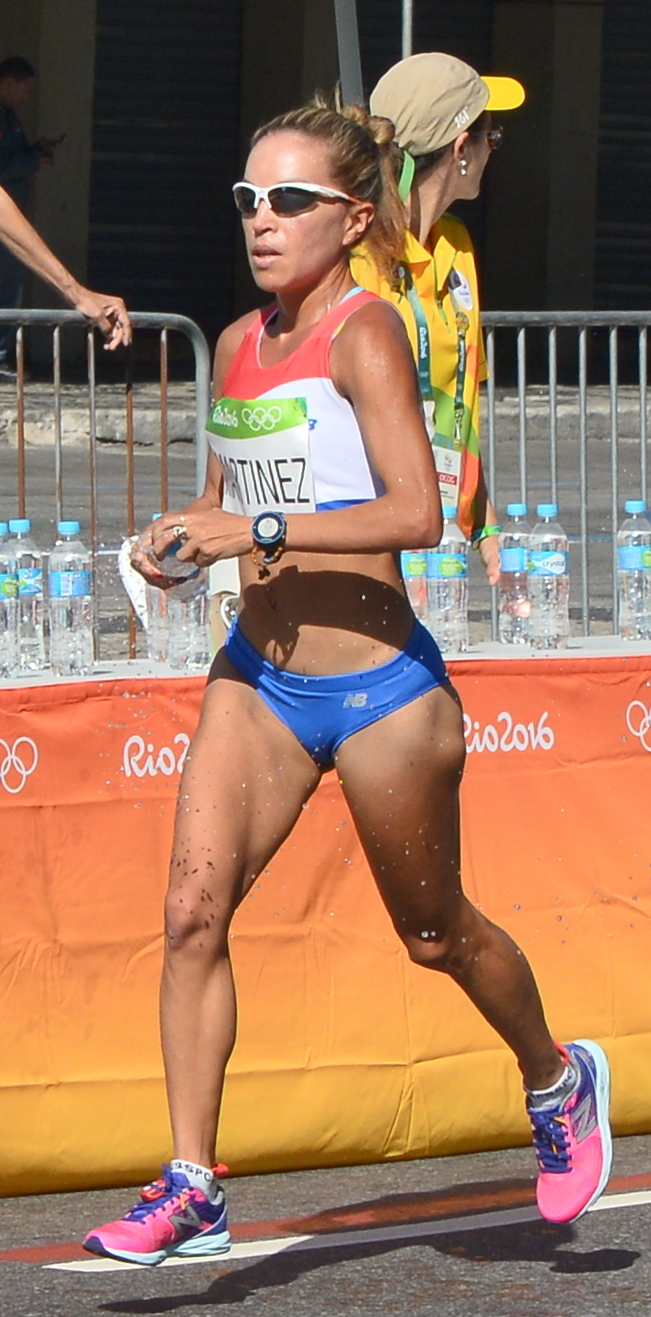
- Martínez at the 2016 Olympics

Personal information
- Full name: Carmen Patricia Martínez Aguilera
- Born: 26 December 1982 (age 43) Asunción, Paraguay
- Height: 160 cm (5 ft 3 in)
- Weight: 55 kg (121 lb)

Sport
- Sport: Track and field
- Events: 5000 m, half marathon, marathon
- Club: Paraguay Marathon Club
- Coached by: Elias Bastos

Achievements and titles
- Personal bests: 5000 m – 16:43.18 (2013); HM – 1:15:44 (2016) NR; Marathon – 2:36:01 (2015) NR

Carmen Patricia Martínez Aguilera (born 26 December 1982) is a Paraguayan long-distance runner who specialises in the marathon. She is the national record holder in both the half marathon and the marathon, and she competed at the 2016 Summer Olympics.

== Career ==
Martínez won the 2014 South American Half Marathon Championships with a time of 1:16:35. She also competed at the 2014 South American Marathon Championships and finished second, behind Érika Olivera. She then finished sixth in the 5000 meters at the 2014 Ibero-American Championships with a national record time. She finished 18th at the 2014 Saint Silvester Road Race.

At the 2016 World Half Marathon Championships, Martínez placed 56th and set a new national record time of 1:15:44. She qualified to represent Paraguay at the 2016 Summer Olympics in the marathon. She finished 115th in a time of 2 hours, 56 minutes, and 43 seconds. She served as the flag bearer for Paraguay during the closing ceremony.

Martínez finished third at the 2017 Düsseldorf Marathon with a new national record time of 2:35:17. She won a gold medal in the 10,000 metres at the 2017 South American Championships. She qualified to compete in the 10,000 metres at the 2017 World Championships, where she finished 31st with a national record time of 33:18.22. She won a bronze medal in the 10,000 metres at the 2017 Bolivarian Games, behind Inés Melchor and Luz Mery Rojas.

Martínez finished sixth in the 10,000 metres at the 2018 South American Games. She won the 2018 Asunción International Marathon with a time of 02:48:10. She finished fourth in the 2022 South American Games marathon with a time of 2:57:47.

== Awards ==
In 2015, she received the Victory of Gold award for best athlete of the year from the Paraguay Sports Journalists' Circle; she was also named Athlete of the Year 2015 by the Paraguayan Athletics Federation.

== See also ==
- List of Paraguayan records in athletics
