= KHYS =

KHYS may refer to:

- Hays Airport, Kansas, USA (ICAO code KHYS)
- KHYS (FM), a radio station licensed to operate on FM frequency 89.7 in Hays, Kansas, United States
- KTJM, a radio station formerly licensed as KHYS, licensed to serve Port Arthur, Texas, United States
