= Feliciano Centurión =

Paraguayan visual artist

- Centurión, c.1989-1992
- Born: Feliciano Centurión; March 20, 1962; San Ignacio, Misiones, Paraguay
- Died: November 7, 1996 (aged 34); Buenos Aires, Argentina
- Known for: Fiber art, Painting
- Notable work: “Cielito Argentino” (“Little Argentine Sky”) “La mirada” (“The Look”)

Feliciano Centurión (March 20, 1962 – November 7, 1996) was a Paraguayan visual artist who lived most of his life in Argentina. He was known for his work in textiles that included embroidery, crochet, knitting and blanket-making.

== Early life ==
Centurión was born March 20, 1962, at San Ignacio de las Misiones, Paraguay. He went to high school in Formosa province (Argentina), and college in Buenos Aires, Argentina.

During his childhood, Centurión was drawn to traditional crafts associated with women's work. He grew up in a household of strong women who taught him to crochet and sew.

== Education ==
Centurión studied branches of the plastic arts at the Oscar R. Albertozzi School of Fine Arts in Formosa. In 1980 he moved to Buenos Aires to study at the Pridiliano Pueyrredón School of Fine Arts and at the Ernesto de la Cárcova Superior School of Fine Arts. He obtained degrees of National Professor and Superior Professor of Painting.

== Career ==
Textile work by Feliciano Centurión at the São Paulo Biennial in 2018. Paint and embroidery on blankets.

Centurión was known for creating work using soft fabrics that he often embroidered and painted, including blankets, handkerchiefs, aprons, pillowcases and tablecloths. His design motifs included diaristic texts and images of flora and fauna. His sensibility has been described as a "decorative, kitschy, feminized and decidedly queer aesthetic."

During his time in Buenos Aires in the late 1980s and 1990s, he became associated with the Centro Cultural Ricardo Rojas where he became acquainted with the work of other young artists who produced "irreverent work" that incorporated queer aesthetics and kitsch references. It was during this time he began to embroider and paint on inexpensive patterned blankets (frazadas) that were purchased from local markets. Centurión became a core member of this group that included Liliana Maresca, Marcelo Pombo, and Omar Schiliro.

After he was diagnosed with HIV/AIDS in the time before accessible treatments were available, he began to reference his personal experiences with illness. Like the work of Félix González-Torres, General Idea and others, he used his creative work to chronicle the effects of illness on his body to "provide a counternarrative to the "gay plague" hysteria in the mass media" at the time. It was during this time that he began to embroider religious images and phrases onto his work. His final works were made while hospitalized; they consisted of a series of embroidered pillows.

== Exhibitions ==
In 2018, Centurión's work was exhibited in the 33rd São Paulo Biennial. In 2020 the Americas Society presented a posthumous solo exhibition of his work, Feliciano Centurión: Abrigo, the first solo exhibition of his work in the United States.

His work has been exhibited in numerous exhibitions internationally and nationally. These include one-person shows at: Ortuzar, New York (2025); the America's Society, New York (2020); Cecilia Brunson Projects, London (2019); National University of Ireland, Maynooth (2016); Centro Cultural de España “Juan Salazar,” Asunción, Paraguay (2013 and 1999); Alberto Sendrós Gallery, Buenos Aires, Argentina (2012 and 2004); Galería Ruta Correa, Freiburg, Germany (1997); Centro de Artes Visuales Isla de Francia, Asunción, Paraguay (1996); Museo de Arte Moderno, Buenos Aires, Argentina (1996); Centro Cultural Ricardo Rojas, Universidad de Buenos Aires, Argentina (1994), among others.

Centurión's work has been featured in many group exhibitions including those at the Museo Amparo, Puebla, Mexico (2019); Blanton Museum of Art, Austin, Texas (2011); Museo de Arte Latinoamericano de Buenos Aires (2009); Museo Nacional de Bellas Artes, Buenos Aires (1994), among other venues.

== Awards ==
- 1989 Award from the Manliba Foundation. Buenos Aires, Argentina.
- 1992 Award from New World Foundation. National Museum of Fine Arts. Buenos Aires, Argentina.

== Collections ==
Centurión's work is held in numerous private collections, and in the permanent collection of the Blanton Museum of Art, the Guggenheim Museum, the Museo de Arte Contemporaneo de Rosario, the Museo de Arte Latinamericano de Buenos Aires, among others.

== Death ==
Centurión died at age 34 from AIDS-related complications in Buenos Aires, November 7, 1996.

== Legacy ==
A monograph on Centurión's work was published in 2021 by the Americas Society. A documentary film was made on Centurión's life titled Feliciano Centurion: An intimate natural embrace (Feliciano Centurión: Íntimo abrazo al natural).
