= Hays, Kansas =

City in Ellis County, Kansas, U.S.

- City and County seat
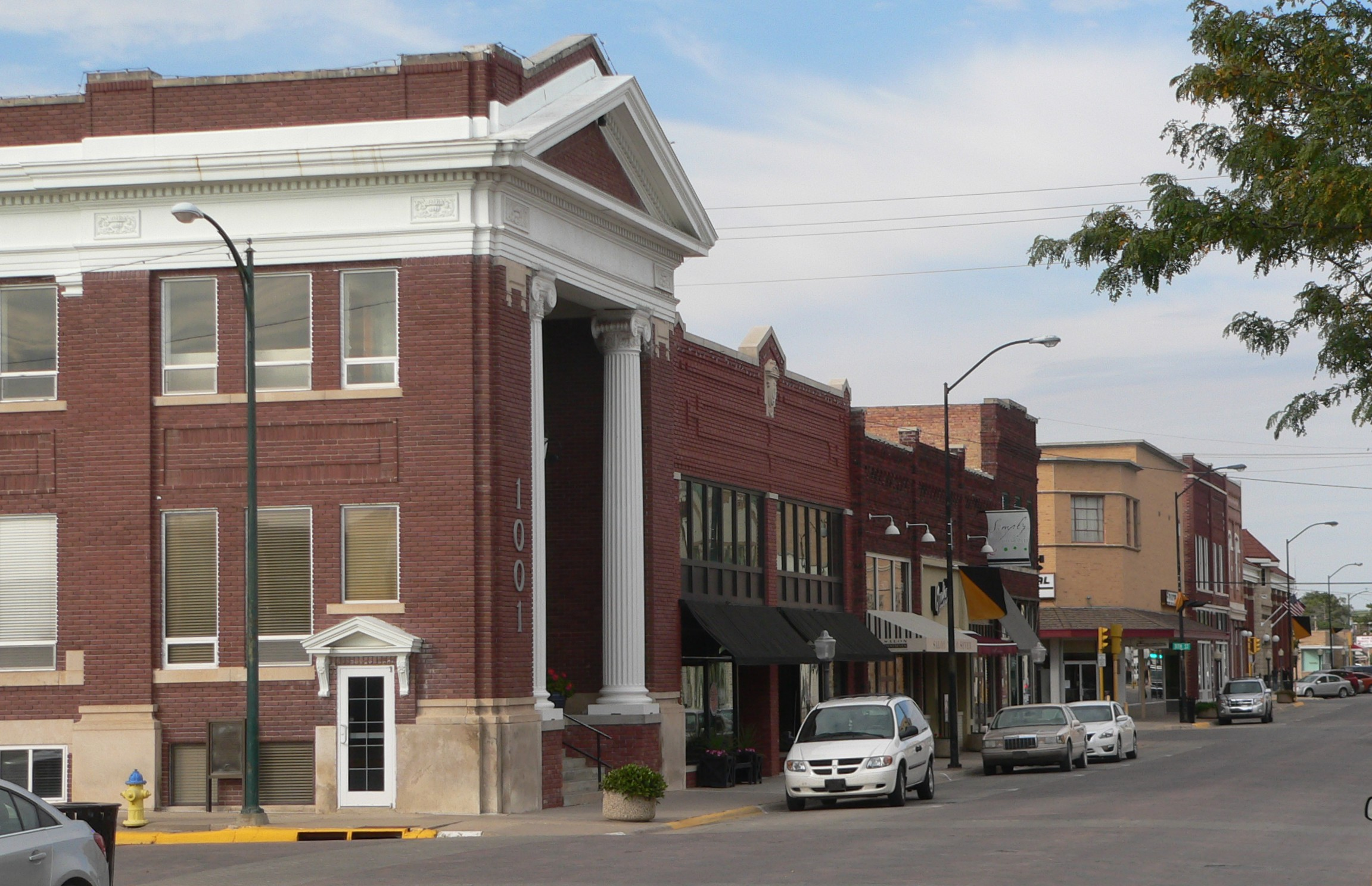
- Main Street in Downtown Hays

- Location within Ellis County and Kansas

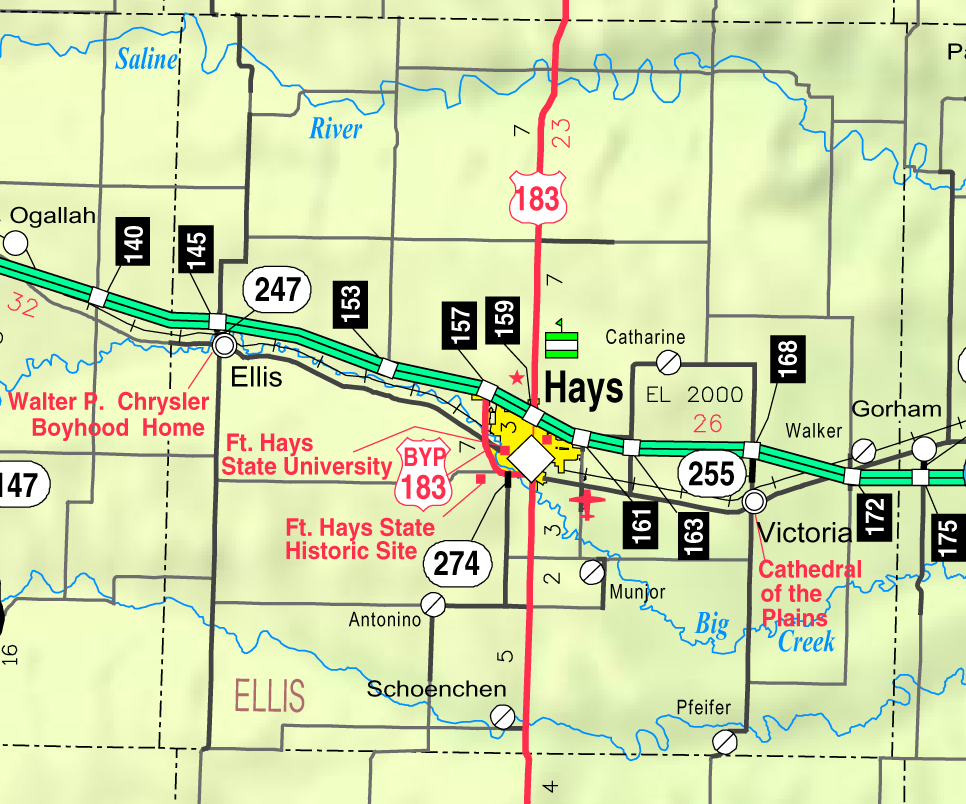
- KDOT map of Ellis County (legend)
- Coordinates: 38°52′46″N 99°19′20″W
- Country: United States
- State: Kansas
- County: Ellis
- Founded: 1867
- Incorporated: 1885
- Named for: Fort Hays

Area
  - Total: 8.48 sq mi (21.96 km^{2})
  - Land: 8.48 sq mi (21.96 km^{2})
  - Water: 0 sq mi (0.00 km^{2})
- Elevation: 2,018 ft (615 m)

Population (2020)
  - Total: 21,116
  - Density: 2,490/sq mi (961.6/km^{2})
- Time zone: UTC-6 (CST)
  - Summer (DST): UTC-5 (CDT)
- ZIP Codes: 67601, 67667
- Area code: 785
- FIPS code: 20-31100
- GNIS ID: 485589
- Website: haysusa.com

Hays is a city in and the county seat of Ellis County, Kansas, United States. The most populous city in northwestern Kansas, it is the economic and cultural center of the region. As of the 2020 census, the population of the city was 21,116. Hays is home to Fort Hays State University.

== History ==
Before American settlement of the area, the site of Hays was located near where the territories of the Arapaho, Kiowa, and Pawnee met. Claimed first by France as part of Louisiana and later acquired by the United States with the Louisiana Purchase in 1803, it lay within the area organized by the U.S. as Kansas Territory in 1854. Kansas became a state in 1861. The state government delineated the surrounding area as Ellis County in 1867.

In 1865, the U.S. Army established Fort Fletcher southeast of present-day Hays to protect stagecoaches traveling the Smoky Hill Trail. A year later, the Army renamed the post Fort Hays in honor of the late Brig. Gen. Alexander Hays, killed in the Battle of the Wilderness. In late 1866, anticipating the construction of the Kansas Pacific Railway as far west as Fort Hays, a party from St. Louis, Missouri led by William Webb selected three sections of land for colonization near the fort. In June 1867, to better serve the railroad, the Army relocated Fort Hays 15 miles northwest to a site near where the railroad was to cross Big Creek, a tributary of the Smoky Hill River. Seeing a business opportunity, Buffalo Bill Cody and railroad contractor William Rose founded the settlement of Rome near the fort's new location. Within a month, the population of Rome grew to over 2,000. Webb, meanwhile, established the Big Creek Land Company and then surveyed and platted a town site, which he named Hays City after the fort, roughly one mile east of Rome. The railroad reached Hays City soon thereafter and constructed a depot there. The railroad's arrival, combined with a cholera epidemic that hit Rome in the late summer of 1867, drove Rome businesses and residents to relocate to Hays City. Within a year, Rome was completely abandoned. As the western terminus of the railway, Hays City grew rapidly, serving as the supply point for territories to the west and southwest.

As a frontier town, Hays City experienced the kind of violence that gave rise to the myth of the American Old West. Several notable figures of the Old West lived in the Hays City of this era, including George Armstrong Custer, his wife Elizabeth Bacon Custer, Calamity Jane, Buffalo Bill Cody, and Wild Bill Hickok who served a brief term as sheriff in 1869. 30 homicides occurred between 1867 and 1873 including a deadly saloon shootout involving Fort Hays soldiers. A cemetery north of town became known as "Boot Hill"; by 1885, it held the bodies of some 79 outlaws.

Hays experienced significant racial violence during the same period. On January 7, 1869, the murder of Union Pacific watchman James Hayes led to the lynching of three African American soldiers of the 38th US Infantry Regiment. That same year, six black soldiers at Fort Hays were murdered, their bodies were dropped in a well that was sodded over, and they were falsely reported as deserters. A mob then hunted down and lynched two black barbers, and the town's black residents were expelled. This and numerous other racial incidents throughout the last half of the 19th century gave Hays a reputation as a sundown town. African Americans living in nearby Nicodemus were not welcome after dark. No signs formally establishing this policy were posted, but the town's reputation for racial discrimination persisted for decades. Hays City became the county seat of Ellis County in 1870, and the town became more civilized. Rougher elements of the populace had begun to leave in the late 1860s, many following the Kansas Pacific railroad construction west to Sheridan or moving south to Dodge City. Volga Germans started settling in Ellis County in 1876, finding its land suitable for their lifestyle and the types of crops they had grown in Russia. They brought with them Turkey Red Wheat, a type of winter wheat whose cultivation contributed to the agricultural transformation of the region. Bukovina Germans began settling in the area in 1886. These groups had a significant impact on the local way of life, establishing Hays as a regional center of ethnic German culture. Hays City was incorporated in 1885, and in 1895, it was renamed as simply Hays.

Fort Hays closed in 1889. In 1900, the Kansas delegation to the U.S. Congress secured the fort's land and facilities for educational purposes. The following year, the Kansas Legislature established the Fort Hays Experiment Station, part of Kansas State Agricultural College, on the Fort Hays reservation and set aside land for the Western Branch of Kansas State Normal School, which opened in 1902 and eventually became Fort Hays State University. Fort Hays opened as a historical park in 1929 and was later acquired by the Kansas Historical Society. In 1967, it became the Fort Hays State Historic Site.

Several disasters have struck Hays over the course of its history. In 1895, fire destroyed 60 buildings downtown. Severe floods occurred in 1907 and 1951. In 1919, three Standard Oil gasoline tanks exploded, killing eight and injuring approximately 150 people. In 1935, the city experienced violent dust storms as part of the Dust Bowl.

Hays began to modernize in the early 1900s with a power plant, waterworks, telephone exchange, and sewer system complete by 1911. Over the following decades, the city evolved into a regional economic hub. Development of oil fields in the surrounding area began in 1936 with Hays serving as a trading center and shipping point. Hays Regional Airport opened in 1961. Interstate 70 reached Hays in 1966. Today, Hays is a commercial and educational center for western Kansas.

== Geography ==
Hays is located in northwestern Kansas at the intersection of Interstate 70 and U.S. Route 183. Hays is 134 miles (216 km) northwest of Wichita, 256 miles (412 km) west of Kansas City, and 311 miles (501 km) east-southeast of Denver.

The city lies in the Smoky Hills region of the Great Plains, approximately 11 miles (18 km) north of the Smoky Hill River and 15 miles (24 km) south of the Saline River. Big Creek, a tributary of the Smoky Hill River, runs through the southwestern part of the city. Chetolah Creek, a tributary of Big Creek, flows south through the eastern part of the city.

According to the United States Census Bureau, the city has a total area of 8.64 square miles (22.38 km^{2}), all land.

=== Climate ===
Hays sits near the convergence of a humid continental climate (Köppen Dwa) and a temperate semi-arid climate (Köppen BSk). It typically experiences hot summers with variable humidity and cold winters. Due to its geographic location at a climatic boundary, severe weather is common, with tornadoes a major threat, especially in the spring and early summer months. On average, January is the coldest month, and July is both the hottest and wettest month. The hottest temperature recorded in Hays was 117 °F (47.2 °C) on July 13, 1934, while the coldest temperature recorded was −26 °F (−32.2 °C) on January 14, 1905, and February 13, 1905. Hays reached 107 °F (41.7 °C) on April 23, 1989, which is the highest April temperature recorded in the United States outside of Arizona, California and Texas.

Climate data for Hays, Kansas, 1991–2020 normals, extremes 1892–present
Month	Jan	Feb	Mar	Apr	May	Jun	Jul	Aug	Sep	Oct	Nov	Dec	Year
Record high °F (°C)	86 (30)	91 (33)	98 (37)	107 (42)	106 (41)	114 (46)	117 (47)	115 (46)	111 (44)	101 (38)	92 (33)	83 (28)	117 (47)
Mean maximum °F (°C)	67.8 (19.9)	72.7 (22.6)	82.7 (28.2)	89.1 (31.7)	95.0 (35.0)	101.8 (38.8)	105.0 (40.6)	102.9 (39.4)	99.2 (37.3)	91.5 (33.1)	78.2 (25.7)	66.6 (19.2)	106.4 (41.3)
Mean daily maximum °F (°C)	42.5 (5.8)	46.2 (7.9)	57.2 (14.0)	66.7 (19.3)	76.3 (24.6)	87.5 (30.8)	92.6 (33.7)	90.0 (32.2)	82.4 (28.0)	69.4 (20.8)	55.8 (13.2)	43.8 (6.6)	67.5 (19.7)
Daily mean °F (°C)	29.6 (−1.3)	32.9 (0.5)	43.3 (6.3)	53.2 (11.8)	63.7 (17.6)	74.6 (23.7)	79.5 (26.4)	77.2 (25.1)	69.0 (20.6)	55.3 (12.9)	41.8 (5.4)	31.4 (−0.3)	54.3 (12.4)
Mean daily minimum °F (°C)	16.7 (−8.5)	19.6 (−6.9)	29.4 (−1.4)	39.7 (4.3)	51.0 (10.6)	61.7 (16.5)	66.4 (19.1)	64.3 (17.9)	55.6 (13.1)	41.2 (5.1)	27.9 (−2.3)	19.0 (−7.2)	41.0 (5.0)
Mean minimum °F (°C)	0.0 (−17.8)	2.3 (−16.5)	10.8 (−11.8)	22.4 (−5.3)	34.4 (1.3)	48.4 (9.1)	54.9 (12.7)	53.2 (11.8)	38.6 (3.7)	23.4 (−4.8)	11.2 (−11.6)	2.7 (−16.3)	−5.0 (−20.6)
Record low °F (°C)	−26 (−32)	−26 (−32)	−23 (−31)	5 (−15)	17 (−8)	31 (−1)	37 (3)	36 (2)	20 (−7)	9 (−13)	−6 (−21)	−21 (−29)	−26 (−32)
Average precipitation inches (mm)	0.56 (14)	0.81 (21)	1.32 (34)	2.13 (54)	3.60 (91)	3.03 (77)	3.95 (100)	3.47 (88)	2.13 (54)	1.68 (43)	0.90 (23)	0.86 (22)	24.44 (621)
Average snowfall inches (cm)	3.4 (8.6)	4.8 (12)	2.1 (5.3)	0.5 (1.3)	0.0 (0.0)	0.0 (0.0)	0.0 (0.0)	0.0 (0.0)	0.0 (0.0)	0.3 (0.76)	1.4 (3.6)	3.3 (8.4)	15.8 (39.96)
Average precipitation days (≥ 0.01 in)	3.3	4.1	5.3	7.3	9.3	8.4	8.7	8.3	6.1	6.0	4.1	3.5	74.4
Average snowy days (≥ 0.1 in)	2.7	2.7	1.4	0.6	0.0	0.0	0.0	0.0	0.0	0.3	1.0	2.3	11.0
Source 1: NOAA
Source 2: National Weather Service

== Demographics ==
Historical population
Census	Pop.	Note	%±
1870	320		—
1880	850		165.6%
1890	1,242		46.1%
1900	1,136		−8.5%
1910	1,961		72.6%
1920	3,165		61.4%
1930	4,618		45.9%
1940	6,385		38.3%
1950	8,625		35.1%
1960	11,947		38.5%
1970	15,396		28.9%
1980	16,301		5.9%
1990	17,767		9.0%
2000	20,013		12.6%
2010	20,510		2.5%
2020	21,116		3.0%
2023 (est.)	21,040		−0.4%
U.S. Decennial Census; 2010-2020

=== 2020 census ===
As of the 2020 census, Hays had a population of 21,116 and 8,610 households, including 4,576 families. The population density was 2,443.1 per square mile (943.3/km^{2}). There were 9,541 housing units at an average density of 1,103.9 per square mile (426.2/km^{2}).

19.6% of residents were under the age of 18; 22.9% were from 18 to 24; 23.8% were from 25 to 44; 18.5% were from 45 to 64; and 15.3% were 65 years of age or older. The median age was 30.7 years. For every 100 females there were 95.8 males, and for every 100 females age 18 and over there were 93.7 males age 18 and over.

99.8% of residents lived in urban areas, while 0.2% lived in rural areas.

Of all households, 24.8% had children under the age of 18 living in them. 40.3% were married-couple households, 22.9% were households with a male householder and no spouse or partner present, and 29.7% were households with a female householder and no spouse or partner present. About 35.9% of all households were made up of individuals and 11.6% had someone living alone who was 65 years of age or older. The average household size was 2.3 and the average family size was 2.9.

There were 9,541 housing units, of which 9.8% were vacant. The homeowner vacancy rate was 1.4% and the rental vacancy rate was 11.4%.

Non-Hispanic whites accounted for 85.8% of the population.

Racial composition as of the 2020 census
Race	Number	Percent
White	18,472	87.5%
Black or African American	313	1.5%
American Indian and Alaska Native	61	0.3%
Asian	242	1.1%
Native Hawaiian and Other Pacific Islander	2	0.0%
Some other race	787	3.7%
Two or more races	1,239	5.9%
Hispanic or Latino (of any race)	1,538	7.3%

2016–2020 ACS estimates

The 2016–2020 5-year American Community Survey estimates show that the median household income was $52,135 (with a margin of error of +/- $5,558) and the median family income was $78,151 (+/- $9,761). Males had a median income of $32,464 (+/- $2,406) versus $25,813 (+/- $3,239) for females. The median income for those above 16 years old was $30,104 (+/- $2,946). Approximately, 8.1% of families and 15.3% of the population were below the poverty line, including 9.4% of those under the age of 18 and 9.5% of those ages 65 or over. The percent of those with a bachelor's degree or higher was estimated to be 26.8% of the population.

=== 2010 census ===
As of the 2010 United States census, there were 20,510 people, 8,698 households, and 4,639 families residing in the city. The population density was 2,579.5 inhabitants per square mile (996.0/km^{2}). There were 9,311 housing units at an average density of 1,171 per square mile (452/km^{2}). The racial makeup of the city was 92.8% Caucasian American, 0.8% African American, 0.3% American Indian, 1.8% Asian, 2.1% from other races, and 1.8% from two or more races. Hispanics and Latinos of any race were 1.7% of the population.

There were 8,698 households, of which 23.3% had children under the age of 18 living with them, 41.7% were married couples living together, 8.2% had a female householder with no husband present, 3.4% had a male householder with no wife present, and 46.7% were non-families. 33.2% of all households were made up of individuals, and 10% had someone living alone who was 65 years of age or older. The average household size was 2.25, and the average family size was 2.89.

The median age in the city was 29.1 years. 19.7% of residents were under the age of 18; 22.7% were between the ages of 18 and 24; 23.6% were from 25 to 44; 21.4% were from 45 to 64; and 12.7% were 65 years of age or older. The gender makeup of the city was 49.3% male and 50.7% female.

The median income for a household was $44,227, and the median income for a family was $62,775. Males had a median income of $35,905 versus $31,379 for females. The per capita income for the city was $24,536. About 5.7% of families and 15.6% of the population were below the poverty line, including 5.9% of those under age 18 and 7.8% of those age 65 or over.

== Economy ==
The service sector constitutes most of the local economy with education and health care being two major industries. Hays also hosts some manufacturing. EnerSys, a producer of sealed lead batteries, operates a plant in the city and Rans Designs, a manufacturer of aircraft and bicycles. Other local companies manufacture oil field supplies, HVAC systems, and wheelchairs.

As of 2012, 76.8% of the population over the age of 16 was in the labor force. 0.1% was in the armed forces, and 76.7% was in the civilian labor force with 73.1% being employed and 3.6% unemployed. The composition, by occupation, of the employed civilian labor force was: 31.2% in sales and office occupations; 30.0% in management, business, science, and arts; 20.0% in service occupations; 9.8% in natural resources, construction, and maintenance; 9.0% in production, transportation, and material moving. The three industries employing the largest percentages of the working civilian labor force were: educational services, health care, and social assistance (30.7%); retail trade (16.2%); and arts, entertainment, recreation, and accommodation and food services (10.5%). HaysMed, Fort Hays State University, and Hays Public Schools are the city's three largest employers. Other major employers include local government, Nex-Tech, Eagle Media, AT&T Inc., and other telecommunications firms, retail stores, and social services providers.

The cost of living in Hays is relatively low; compared to a U.S. average of 100, the cost of living index for the city is 81.7. As of 2012, the median home value in the city was $147,300, the median selected monthly owner cost was $1,254 for housing units with a mortgage and $445 for those without, and the median gross rent was $584.

== Arts and culture ==
=== Arts and music ===
An established arts community supports several galleries in the city. The Hays Arts Council operates the Hays Arts Center Gallery, which displays the work of Kansas artists and sponsors exhibitions and competitions throughout the year. FHSU's Moss-Thorns Gallery of Art, affiliated with the university's Art Department, displays student and faculty works as well as traveling exhibits. In addition, a number of local artists manage their own galleries around the city.

The Hays Symphony, established in 1914, is an ensemble of university, regional, and community musicians that performs in FHSU's Beach/Schmidt Performing Arts Center. The center also hosts the university's Encore Series, a performing arts series that consists of dramatic and musical performances throughout the year.

=== Events ===
Hays is a regional center of German American culture due to the number of German immigrants who settled the area in the 1870s and 1880s. As of 2010, 56.5% of the city population claimed German ancestry. The city hosts several events throughout the year that celebrate this heritage including two Oktoberfests. The Midwest Deutsche Oktoberfest takes place the third week of September. The Volga German Centennial Association host an Oktoberfest celebration in late September or early October in conjunction with the Fort Hays State University homecoming activities.

To celebrate Independence Day and to mark its early history as an Old West frontier town, the city hosts the annual Wild West Festival during the first week of July. The festival includes country and rock music concerts, a parade and a fireworks display. On the first weekend in December, the Kansas Historical Society holds Christmas Past at Historic Fort Hays, showcasing history programs and tours of the fort with it decorated for Christmas as it was in the late 1800s.

Each April Audubon of Kansas holds their annual Prairie-Chicken Festival in Hays.

=== Points of interest ===
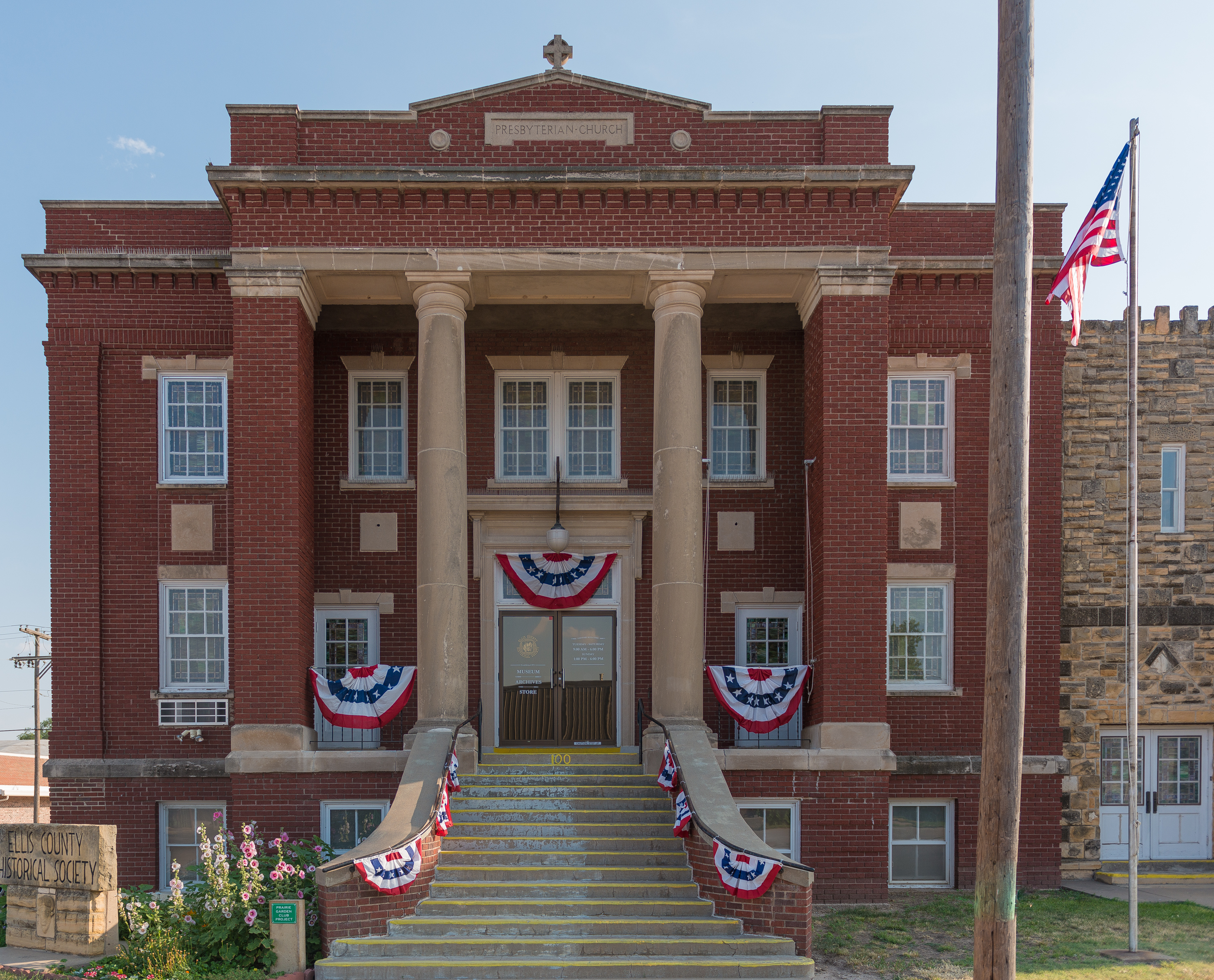
Ellis County Historical Society Museum

There are several museums and sites in Hays dedicated to aspects of area history. FHSU's Sternberg Museum of Natural History features extensive collections and exhibits of fossil specimens, including an interactive diorama of life in the region during the Cretaceous period. Affiliated with the university's Departments of Geosciences and Biology, the museum also hosts educational programs on fossil preparation and ongoing scientific research. The Ellis County Historical Society Museum, located downtown, maintains exhibits of artifacts from the area's Old West period through its settlement by Volga and Bukovina Germans. Included in the museum complex are the Volga German Haus, a reproduction of an early Volga German settler home, and a stone chapel constructed in 1879. Southwest of Hays, the Kansas Historical Society maintains the Fort Hays State Historic Site. It consists of four of the fort's original structures and a visitor center. Other sites related to the area's frontier period include Boot Hill, the city's earliest cemetery, and a historical marker at the site of the ill-fated town of Rome.

Downtown Hays features the historic Chestnut Street District. Local businesses offer dining, shopping, and entertainment, and visitors can tour designated historical sites in the district via a self-guided walking tour.

=== Religion ===
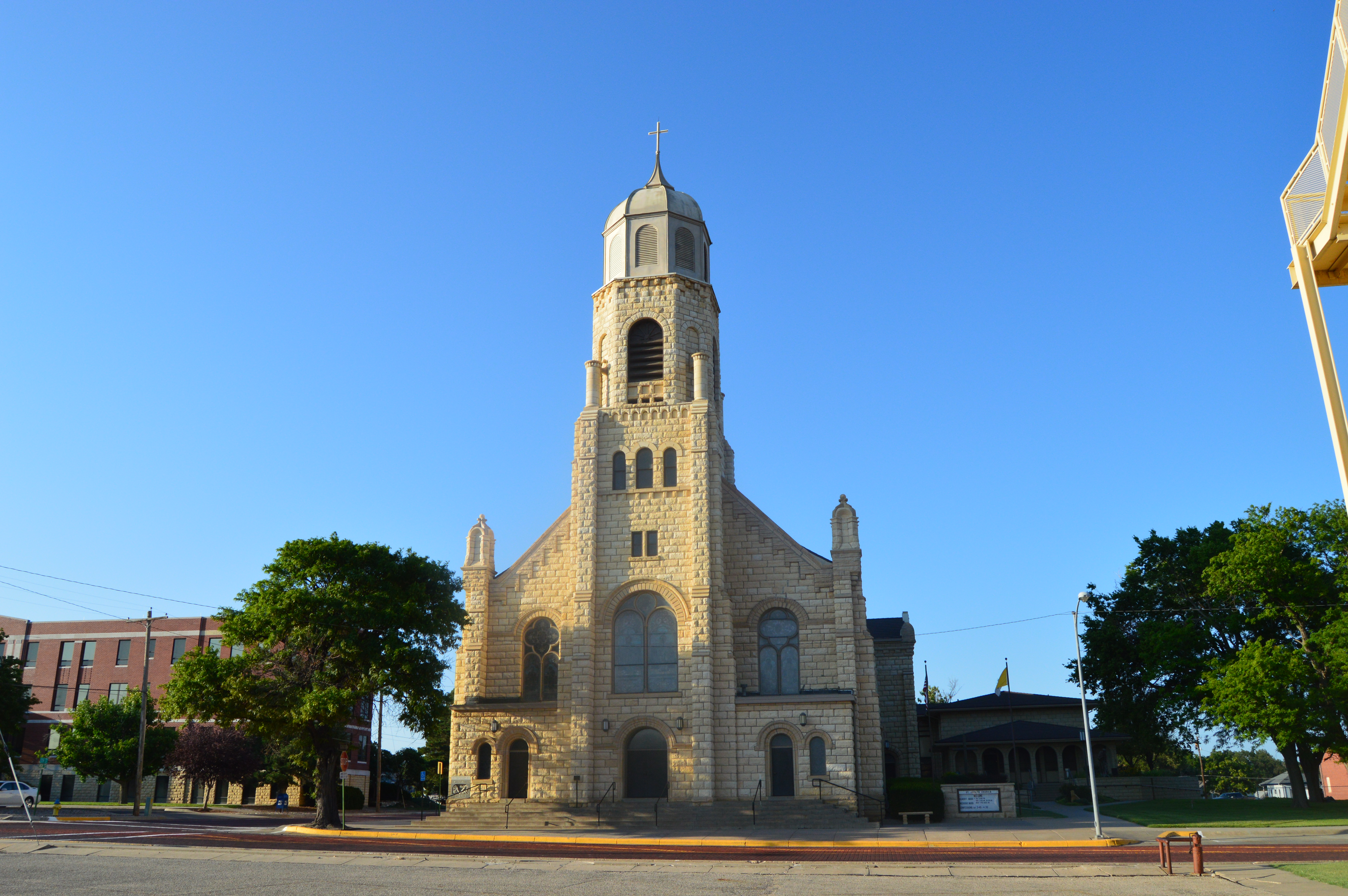
St. Joseph's Church in Hays is listed on the National Register of Historical Places.

There are 27 Christian churches in Hays, the majority of which are Protestant. That number also includes four Catholic churches, a Jehovah's Witnesses congregation, and a meetinghouse of the Church of Jesus Christ of Latter-day Saints. Hays is also home to a community of the Baháʼí Faith. The Hays District of the United Methodist Church, which consists of 21 counties in northwestern Kansas, is headquartered in the city.

== Sports ==
Fort Hays State University's athletic teams, known as the Fort Hays Tigers, compete in several sports in the NCAA Division II MIAA conference.

In addition to FHSU sports, Hays is home to an amateur baseball team and a rodeo company. The Hays Larks are a collegiate summer baseball team in the Jayhawk Collegiate League of the National Baseball Congress. The team dates back to 1869 when local residents founded it as The Hays Town Team.

== Parks and recreation ==
The city government's Parks Department maintains 21 parks in the city. The largest is Frontier Park, located immediately south of downtown across the U.S. 183 bypass route from the Fort Hays State Historic Site. Divided into eastern, western, and northern sections, it includes an 18-hole disc golf course and pens that are home to a herd of American bison kept at the park since 1953. The department also maintains three baseball parks, a soccer complex, tennis courts, a roller hockey and skateboard park, and a second, 9-hole disc golf course. In addition, the Hays Recreation Commission manages a municipal swimming pool and a waterpark, Hays Aquatic Park.

There are two golf courses in the city, Fort Hays Municipal Golf Course and Smoky Hill Country Club. The municipal course is an 18-hole course located immediately southwest of the city, built around the Fort Hays historical site. Smoky Hill Country Club is a private, 18-hole course that opened in the western part of the city in 1962.

== Government ==
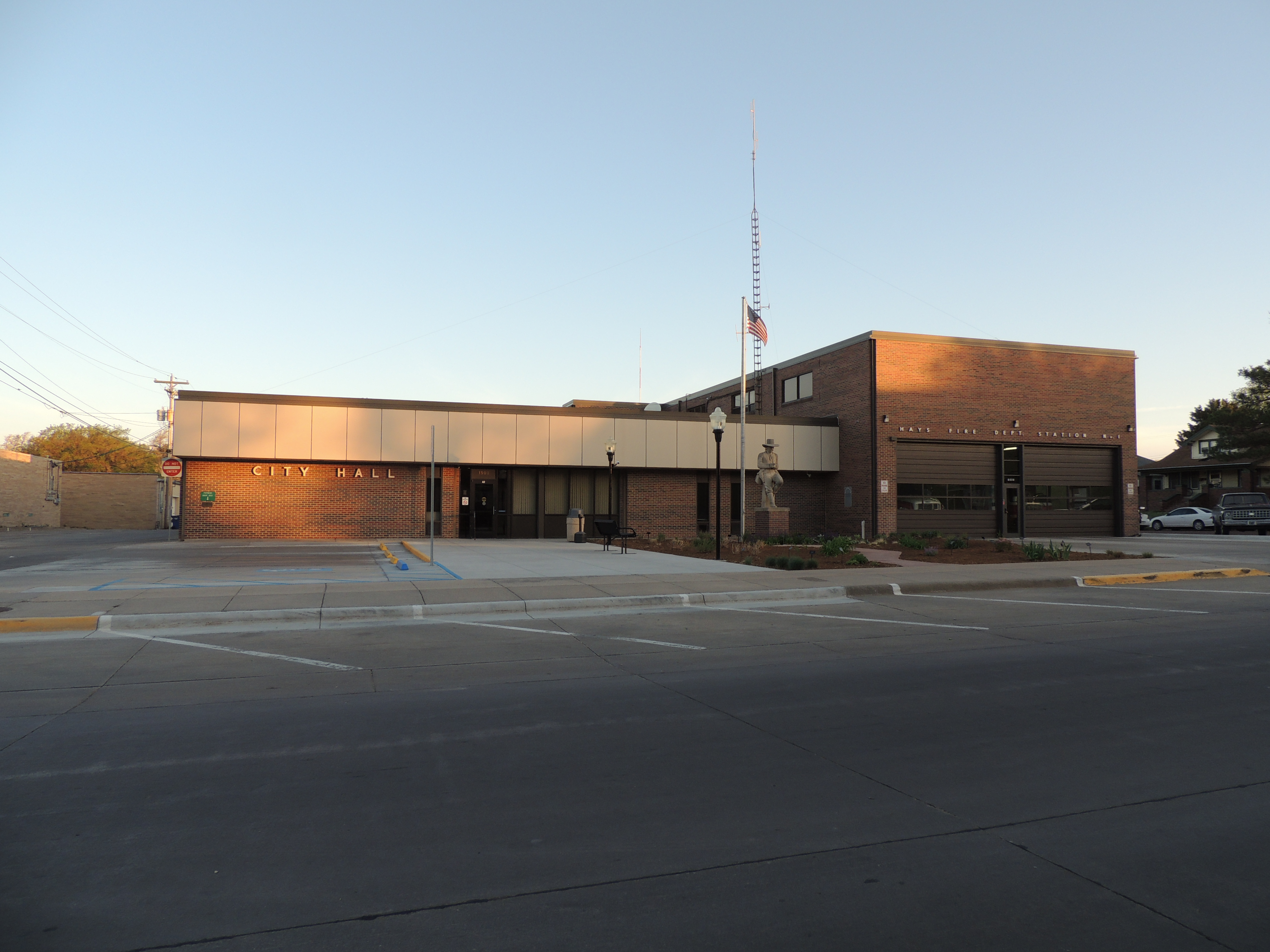
Hays City Hall

Hays is a city of the second class with a commission-manager form of government, which it adopted in 1919. The city commission consists of five commissioners, with at-large elections occurring every two years. The commission meets on the second and fourth Thursdays of each month. One commissioner serves as mayor, presiding over commission meetings and representing the city at ceremonial events. The city manager is hired by the commission and is responsible for advising the commission, enforcing its policies, administering city employees, and preparing a proposed city budget.

As the county seat, Hays is the administrative center of Ellis County. The county courthouse is located downtown, and all departments of the county government base their operations in the city.

Hays lies within Kansas's 1st U.S. Congressional District. For the purposes of representation in the Kansas Legislature, the city is located in the 40th district of the Kansas Senate and the 111th district of the Kansas House of Representatives.

== Education ==
=== Primary and secondary education ===
The community is served by Hays USD 489 public school district, which operates eight schools in Hays:

- Lincoln Elementary School (Grades Pre-K)
- O'Loughlin Elementary School (Pre-K-5)
- Roosevelt Elementary School (Pre-K-5)
- Woodrow Wilson Elementary School (Pre-K-5)
- Hays Middle School (6–8)
- Hays High School (9–12)
- Westside School, alternative school
- The Learning Center, alternative school

The Roman Catholic Diocese of Salina oversees two Catholic schools in Hays: Holy Family Elementary School (Pre-K-5) and Thomas More Prep-Marian (6–12). There is also another Christian school in the city: Hays Seventh-Day Adventist School (K-8).

=== Colleges and universities ===
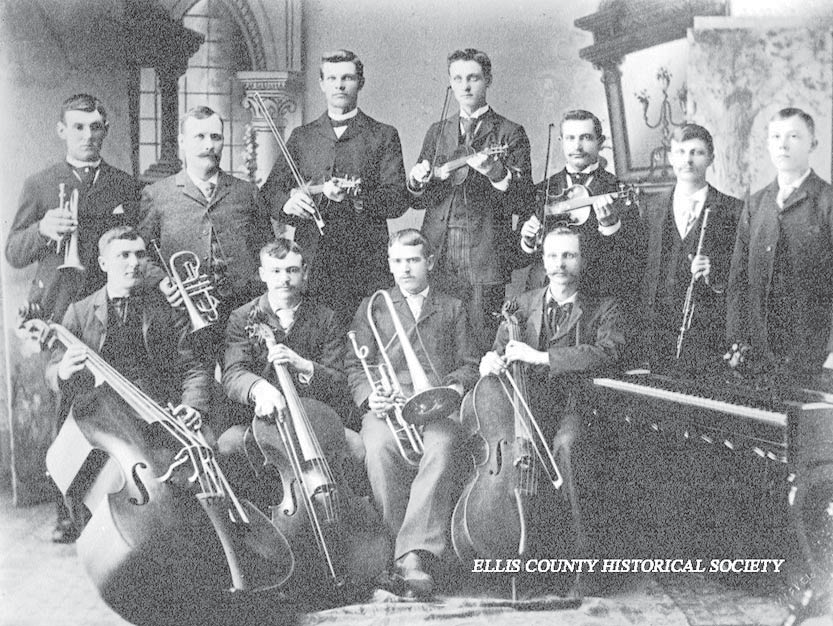
The Paul Bissing Orchestra, circa 1900. Petrowitsch Bissing is on the back row, fourth from the left.

Fort Hays State University (FHSU) is located in Hays. A four-year public university with more than 12,000 students, it is the third largest university in Kansas. Fort Hays Tech | North Central, a two-year public college based in Beloit, Kansas, and affiliated with FHSU also has a campus in Hays. Immediately south of the city, Kansas State University operates its Agricultural Research Center—Hays, formerly the Fort Hays Experiment Station. The Center studies regional crop management and livestock production, and, for that purpose, its 7,810 acres (31.6 km^{2}) campus includes a feedlot, a greenhouse complex, cropland, and rangeland as well as a preserved natural area.

Hays was home to the now closed Bissing's Conservatory of Music established by Petrowitsch Bissing in 1901. Records show that it was still in operation as of 1918.

=== Libraries ===
Hays Public Library, located downtown, is the city's main library. Its collection consists of more than 145,000 volumes, and it circulates more than 1.1 million items annually. The Library first opened in 1900, expanding into a Carnegie library in 1911, which remained open until its replacement by a larger facility in 1968. That facility, in turn, has since been renovated and expanded further, re-opening in 2004. A remodel began in 2020 and was completed in 2025. The library offers several services to the public, including computer classes, ESL and literacy tutoring, and programs for adults, teens, and children. The Hays Public Library is home to the Dorothy D. Richards Kansas Room, a local history and reference collection consisting of books and resources pertaining to the history of Kansas and the American West. The room is named after Dorothy Richards, the library's former director and first Kansas Room Librarian. She started the collection by setting aside Kansas related materials behind her desk. Today, The Kansas Room offers programs related to history, natural history, and genealogy. FHSU's Tebo Library holds more than 225,000 volumes and serves as a federal depository library. In addition to government documents, its special collections include an archive of children's literature and materials relating to regional history and culture. The Tebo Library, which opened its doors in 1967, saw a transformational remodel, completed in 2026. During the process, the name was changed from Forsyth to Tebo Library.

== Infrastructure ==
=== Transportation ===
Interstate 70 and U.S. Route 40 run concurrently southeast-northwest immediately north of Hays. U.S. Route 183 runs north–south through Hays, intersecting I-70 immediately north of the city. A U.S. 183 bypass route runs around Hays to the west from U.S. 183 immediately south of the city to I-70 northwest of the city.

Hays Regional Airport is located just southeast of the city. Used primarily for general aviation, it hosts one commercial airline United Express, which offers daily jet service to Denver, Colorado.

Union Pacific Railroad provides freight rail transport via its Kansas Pacific (KP) line, which runs southeast–northwest through downtown Hays in the southern part of the city. As of 2025, the nearest passenger rail station is located in Dodge City, where Amtrak's Southwest Chief stops once daily on a route from Chicago to Los Angeles.

Greyhound Lines provides intercity bus service via Hays to St. Louis and Denver. Limited local bus service is available through Fort Hays State University. The university operates the Tiger Transport shuttle service on Wednesdays, Fridays, and Saturdays in the afternoons.

=== Utilities ===
Water production and distribution, waste water collection and treatment, and sewer maintenance are the responsibility of the city government's Water Resources Department. The government's Public Works Department and several local businesses provide trash removal. Midwest Energy, Inc., a regional energy company headquartered in the city, provides both electric power and natural gas service.

=== Health care ===
HaysMed is the sole hospital in the city. A private, non-profit hospital established in 1991, it is a 165-bed general medical and surgical facility that serves as a regional referral center for northwestern Kansas.

== Media ==
The Hays Daily News is the city's primary newspaper, published two days a week.

Hays is a center of broadcast media for central and northwestern Kansas. One AM radio station, 12 FM radio stations, and three television stations are licensed to and/or broadcast from the city. Hays is in the Wichita-Hutchinson television market, and two television stations broadcast from the city, CBS-affiliated KBSH, and K25CV-D, an ABC translator station, both of which are satellite stations of their respective affiliates in Wichita. The third station is the flagship station of Smoky Hills Public Television, the PBS member network covering western Kansas. Licensed to Hays, it broadcasts from studios in Bunker Hill, Kansas.

== In popular culture ==
Hays has been a setting of multiple films. The Plainsman (1936) and Wild Bill (1995), both of which dramatize the life and career of Wild Bill Hickok, are partially set in Hays during the late 1860s and early 1870s. Paper Moon (1973) is partially set in Great Depression–era Hays, and a portion of the film was shot in the city. Hays is also the subject of the song "Hays, Kansas" by the band 49 Winchester.

Hays was the subject of an April 1952 cultural article in National Geographic magazine.

== Notable people ==
Several Old West figures lived in Hays during its period as a frontier outpost, including Calamity Jane (1852–1903), Buffalo Bill Cody (1846–1917), General George Custer (1839–1876) and his wife Elizabeth (1842–1933), and gunfighters Wild Bill Hickok (1837–1876) and Clay Allison (1840–1887).

Other notable individuals who were born in and/or have lived in Hays include business magnate Philip Anschutz (born 1939), U.S. Senator Jerry Moran (born 1954), physician Sadie Bay Adair (1868–1944), and feminist legal pioneer Frances Tilton Weaver (1904–2003).

== Sister cities ==
Hays has two sister cities as designated by Sister Cities International:

- Santa Maria, Paraguay
- Xinzheng, Henan, China

== Gallery ==
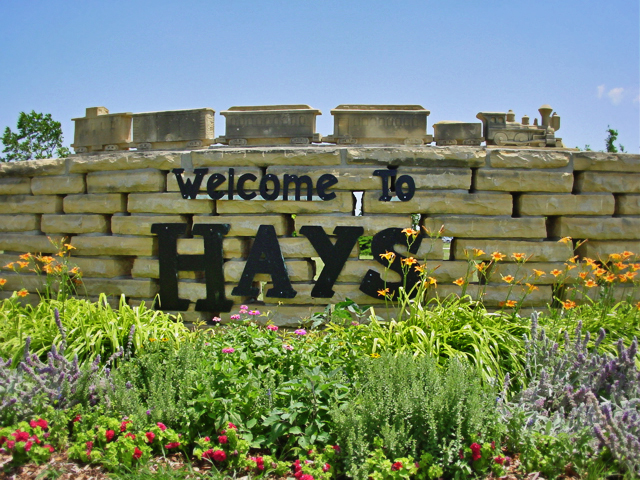
Stone work sign that greets visitors

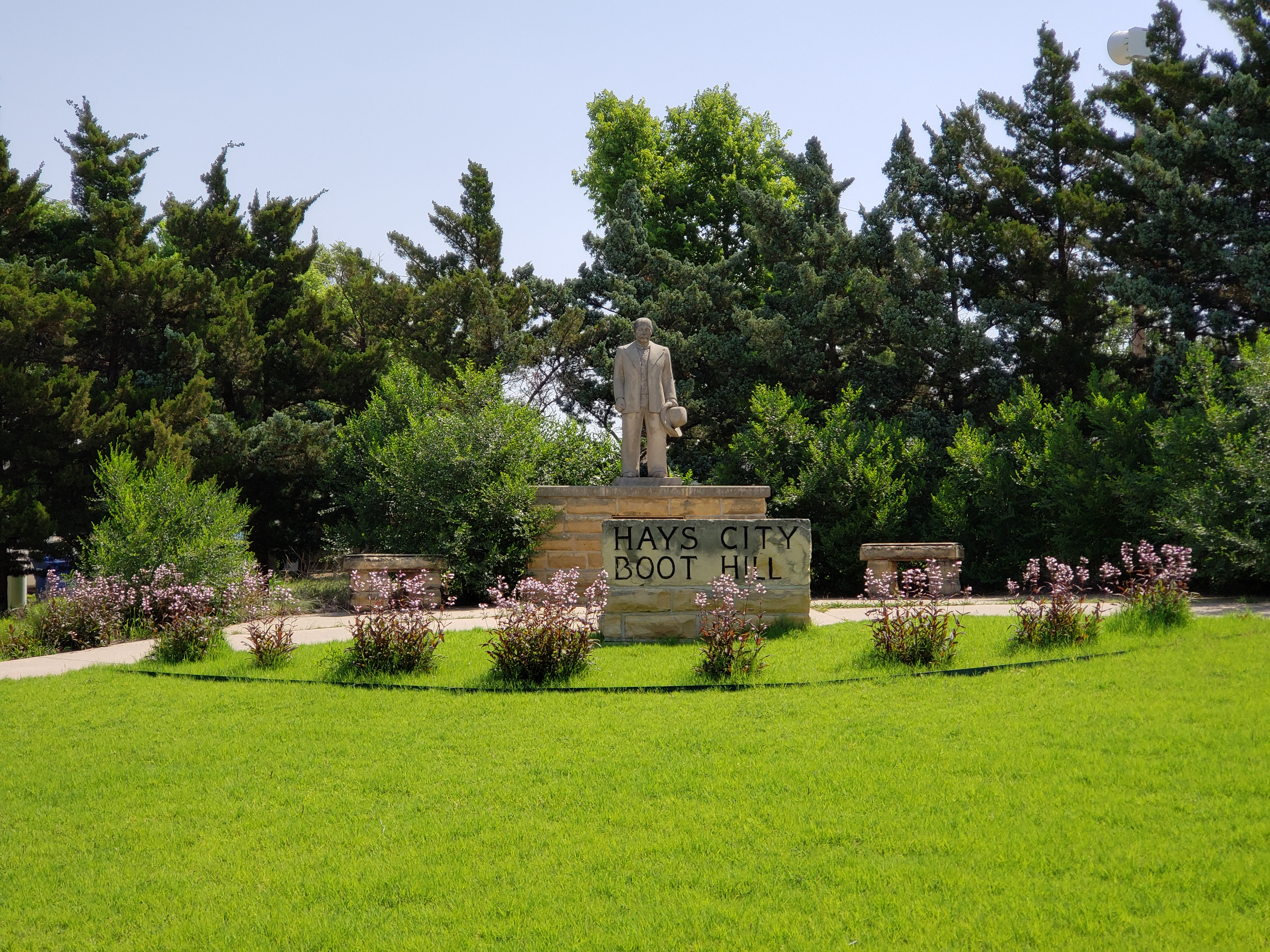
Boot Hill Cemetery

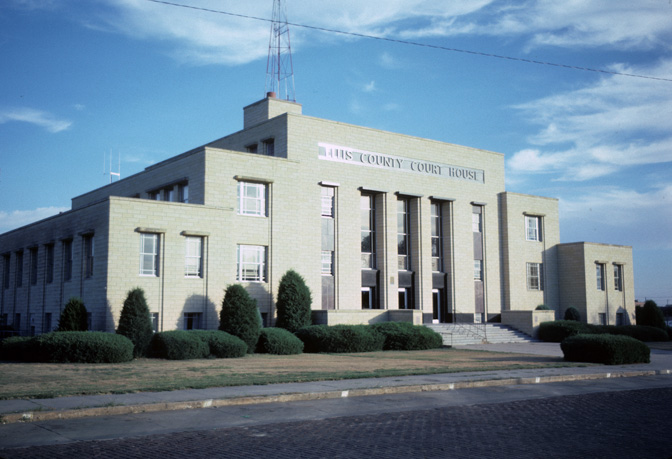
Ellis County Courthouse

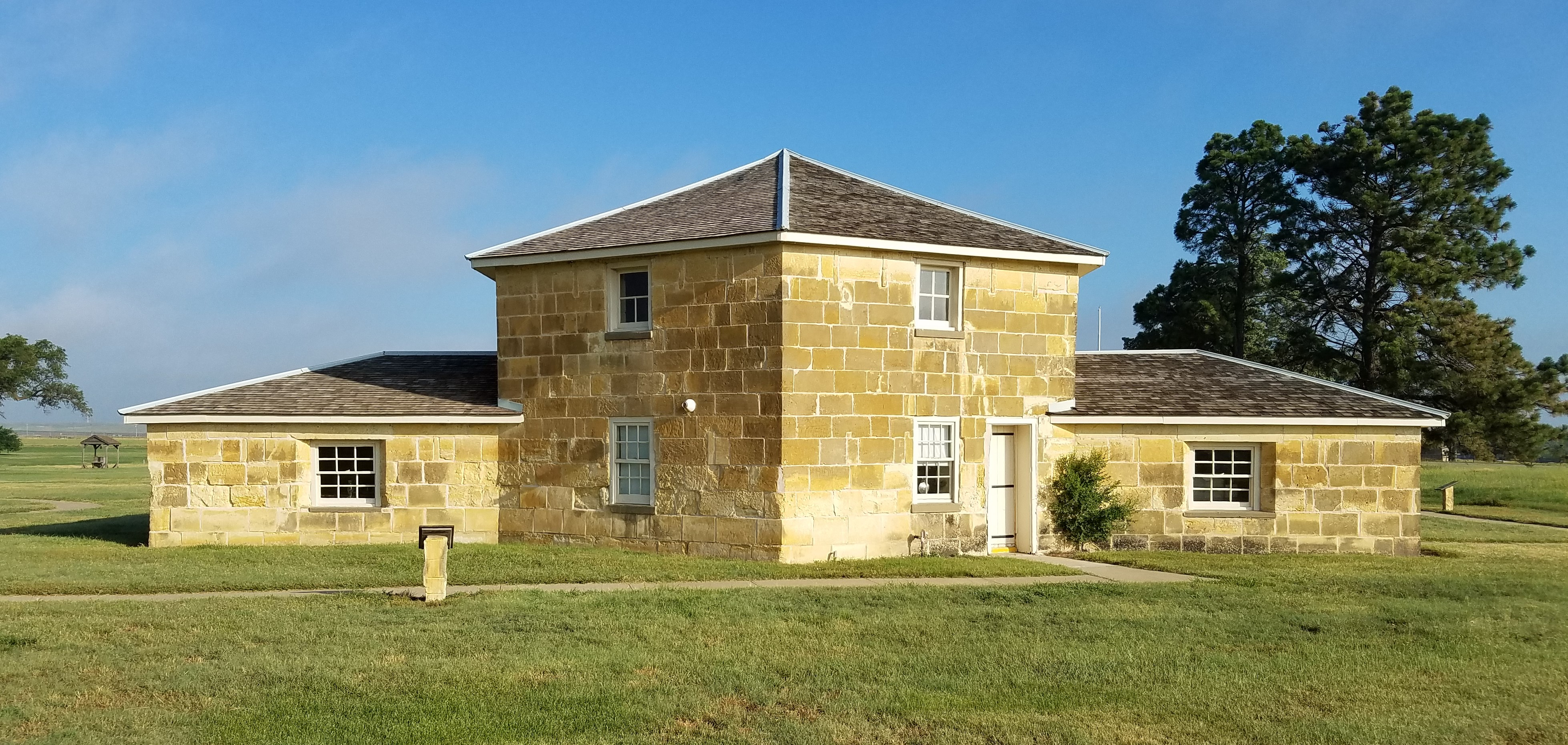
Fort Hays blockhouse

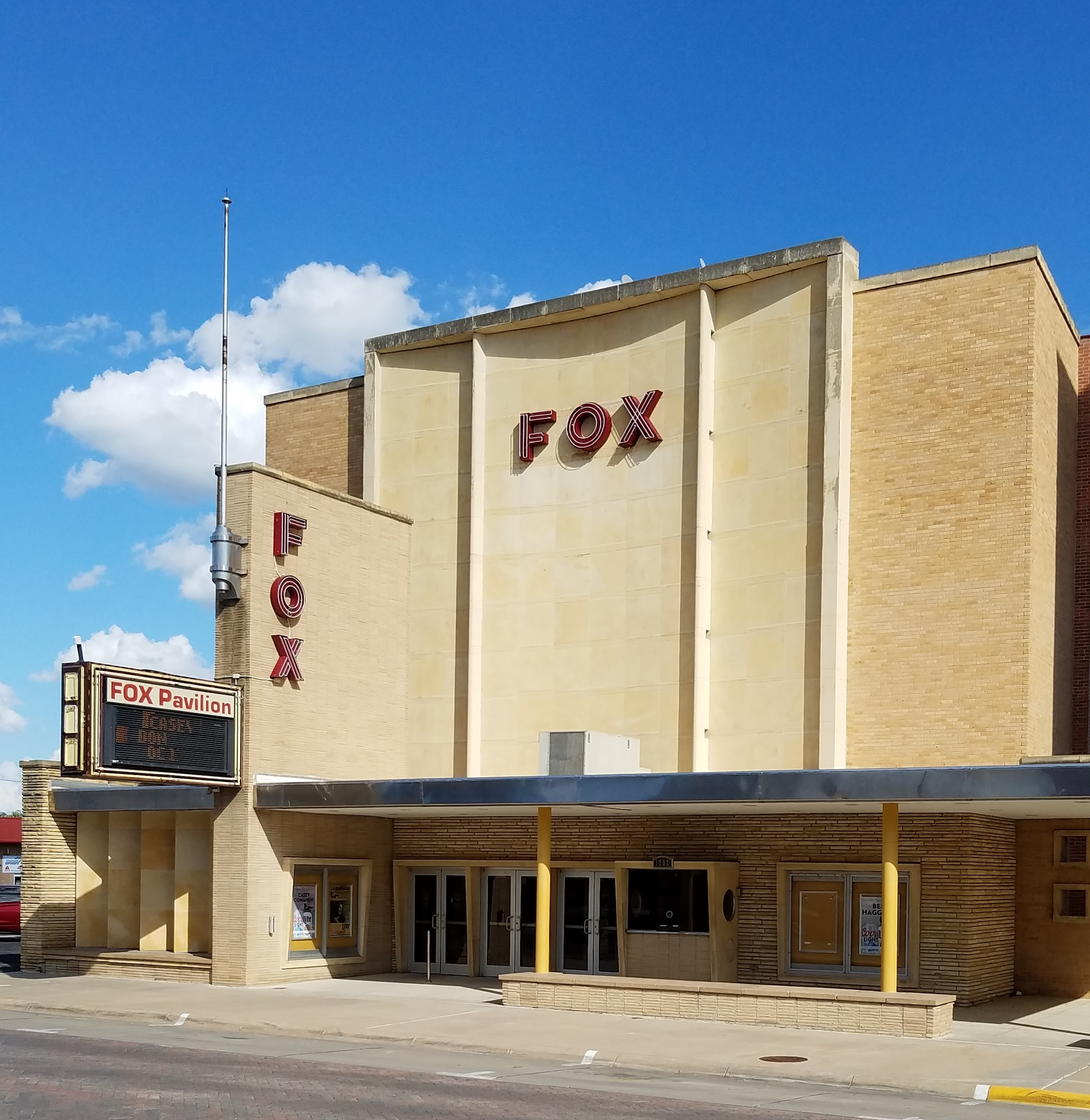
The Fox Pavilion
fmr. Fox Theater

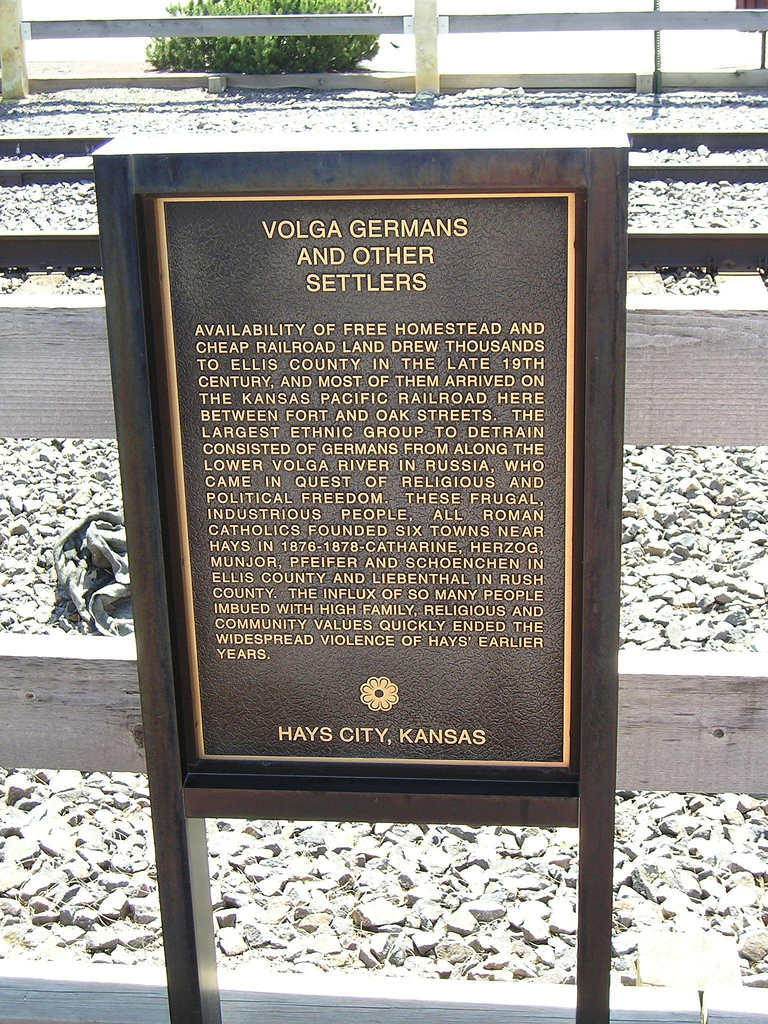
Historical marker discussing Volga Germans and other settlers

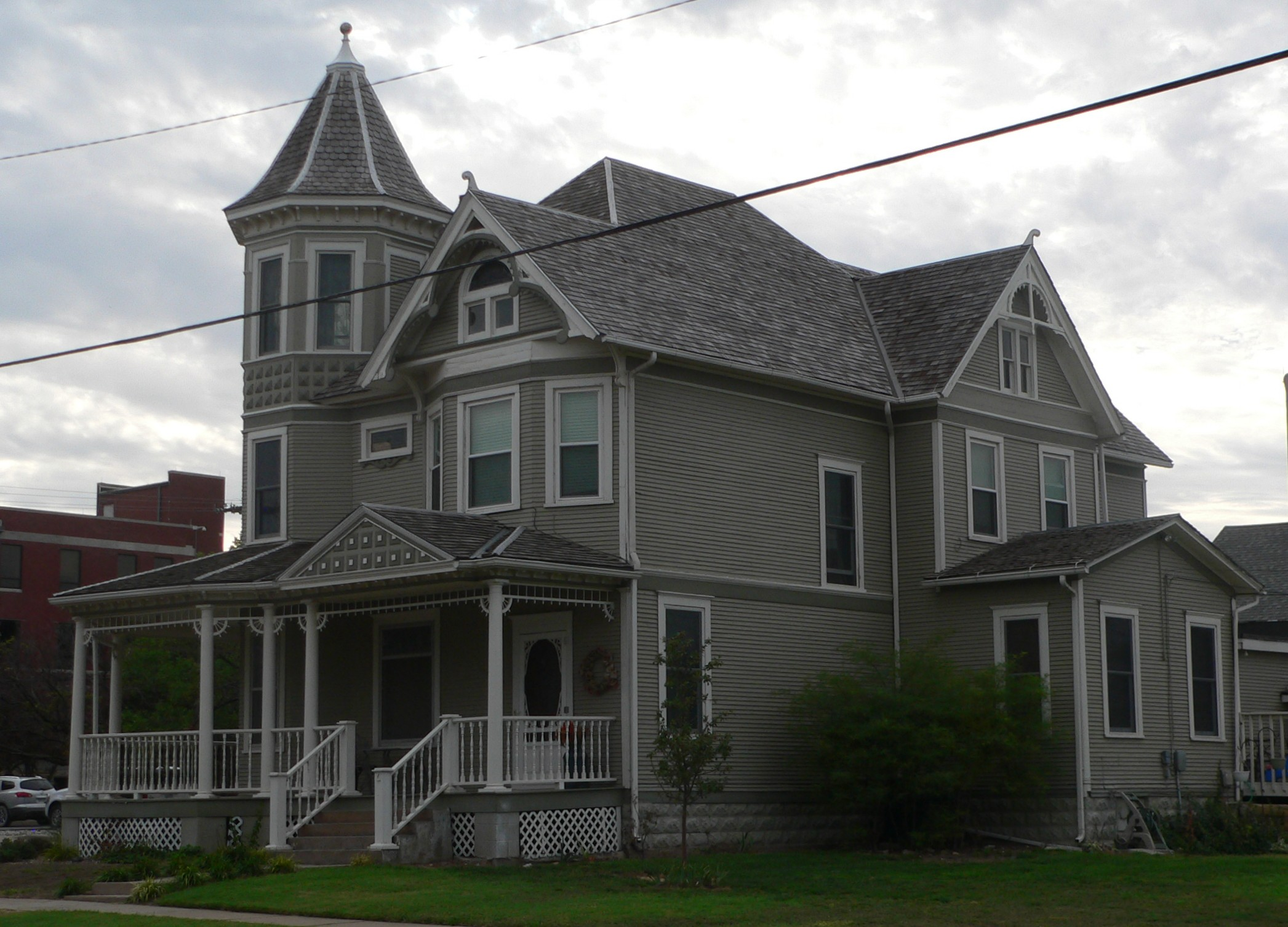
J. A. Mermis House

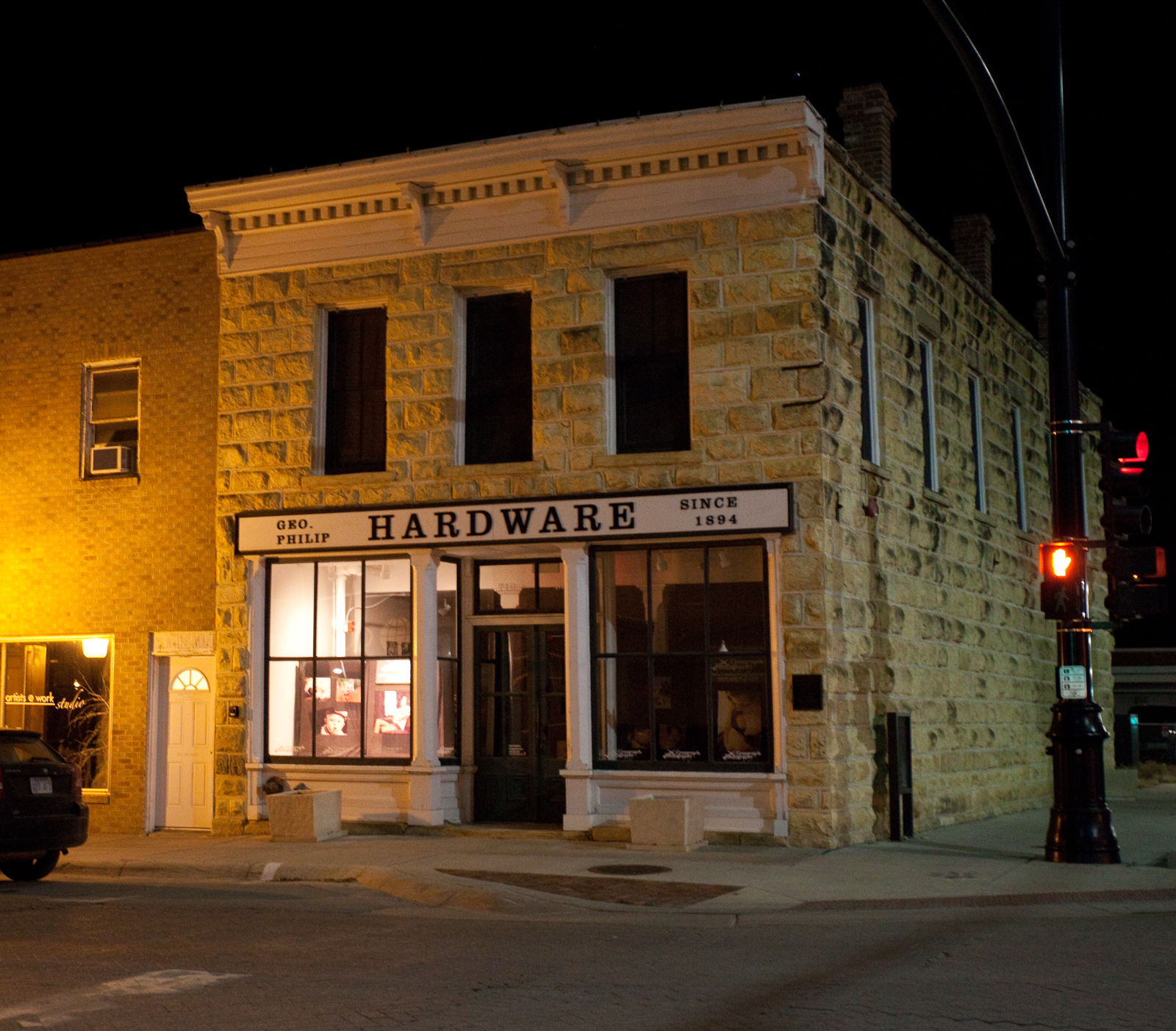
Philip Hardware Building

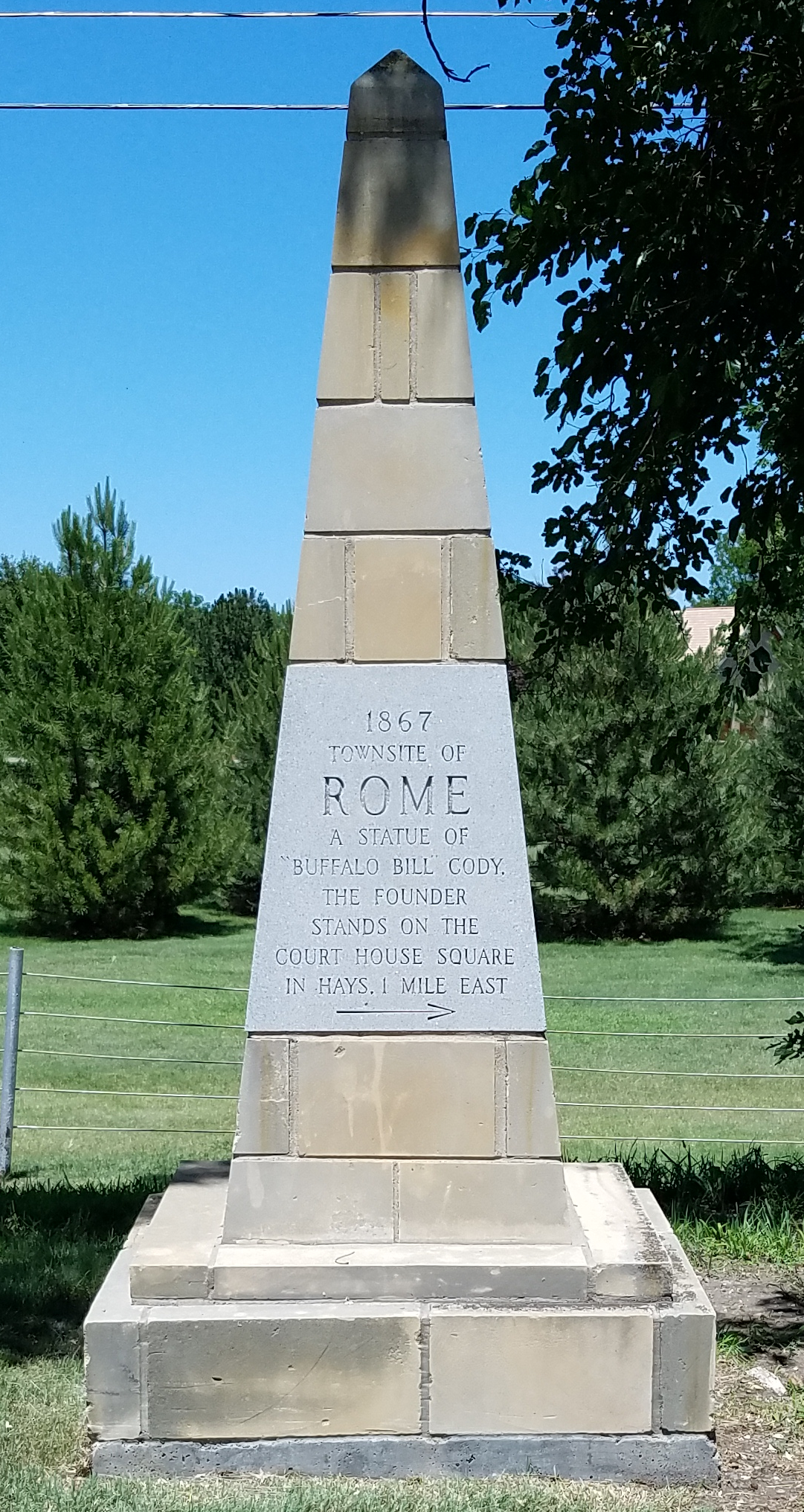
Rome, Kansas town site historical marker

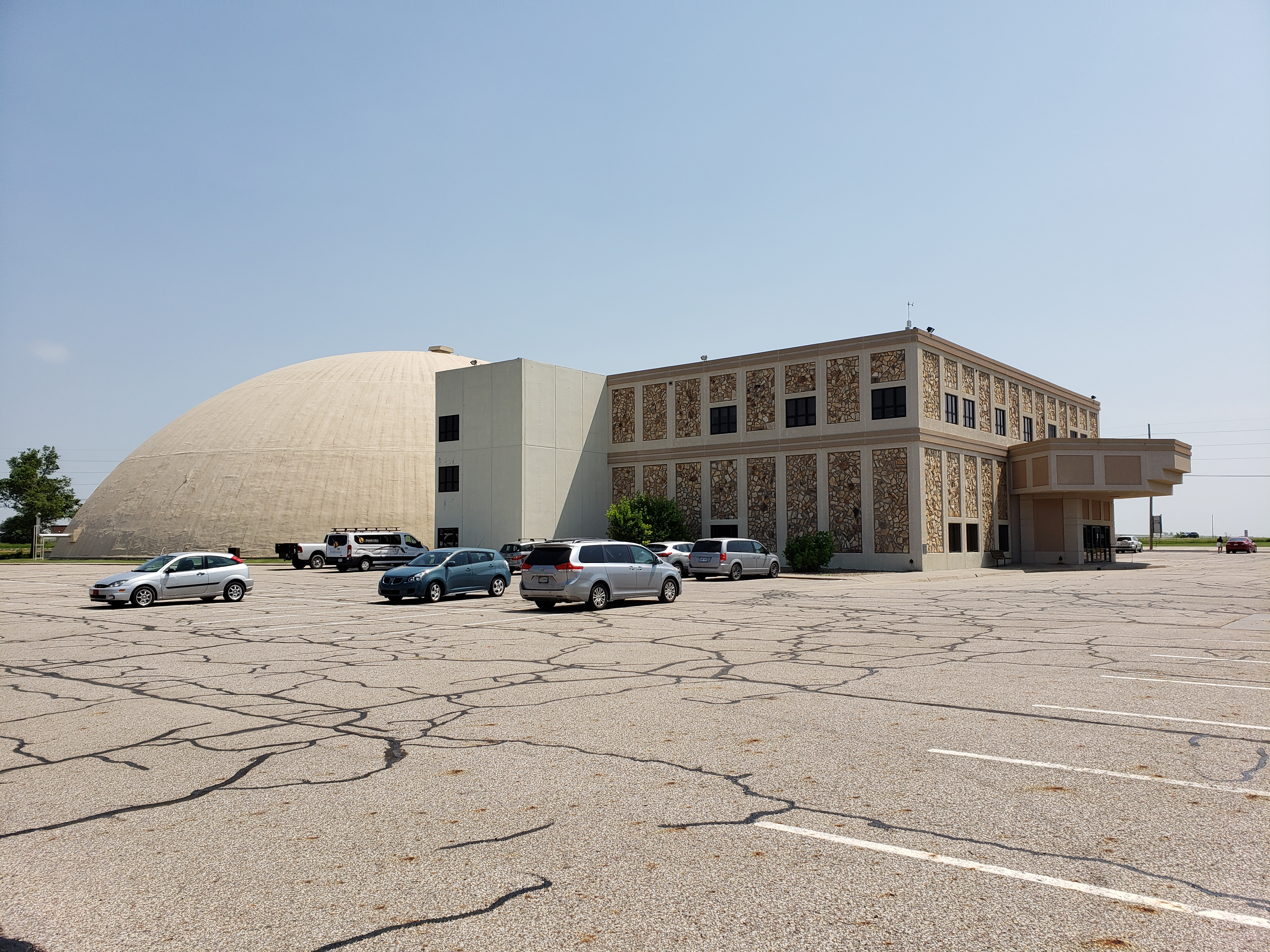
Sternberg Museum of Natural History

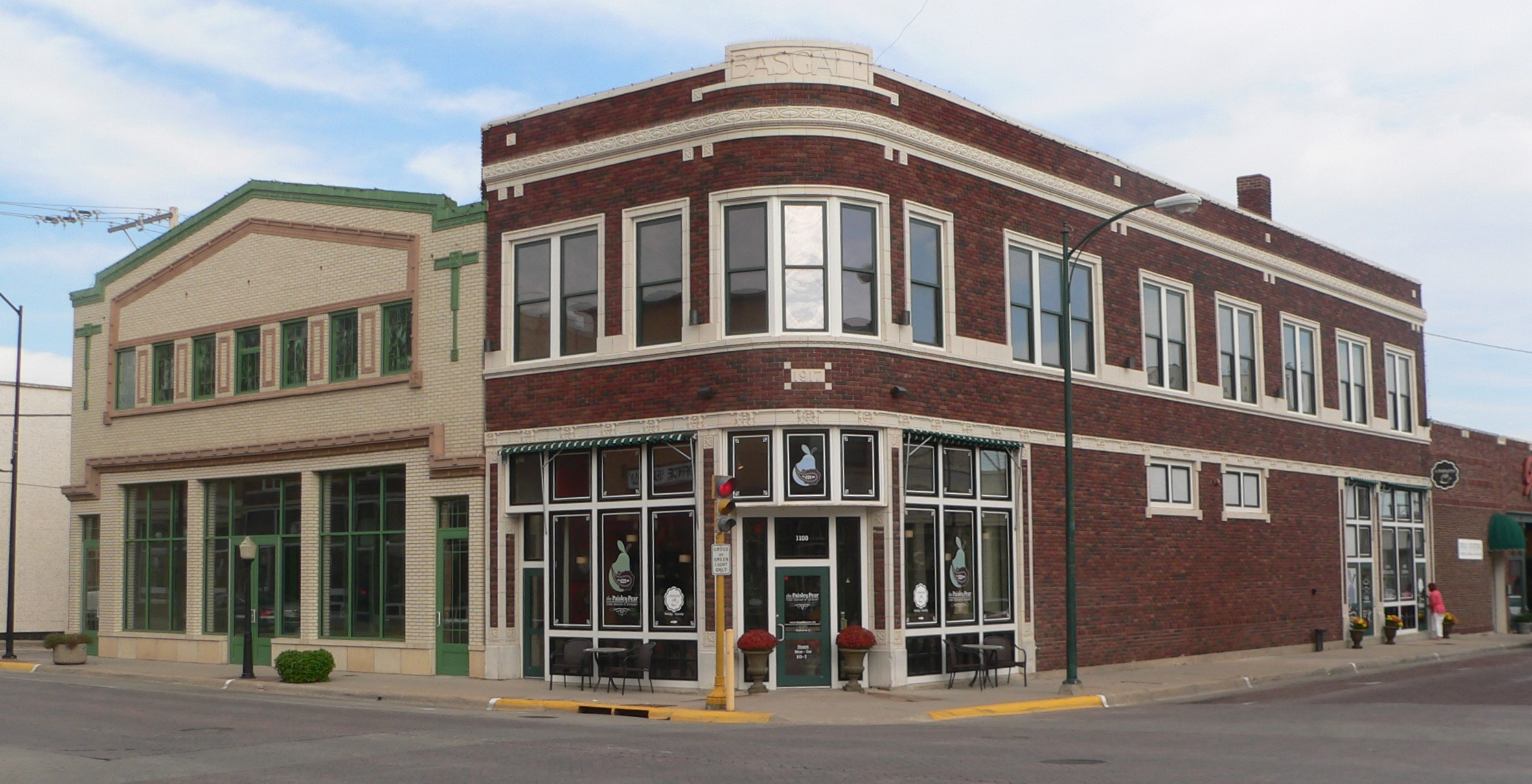
The Strand Theater Building (left) and the Basgall Building (center)

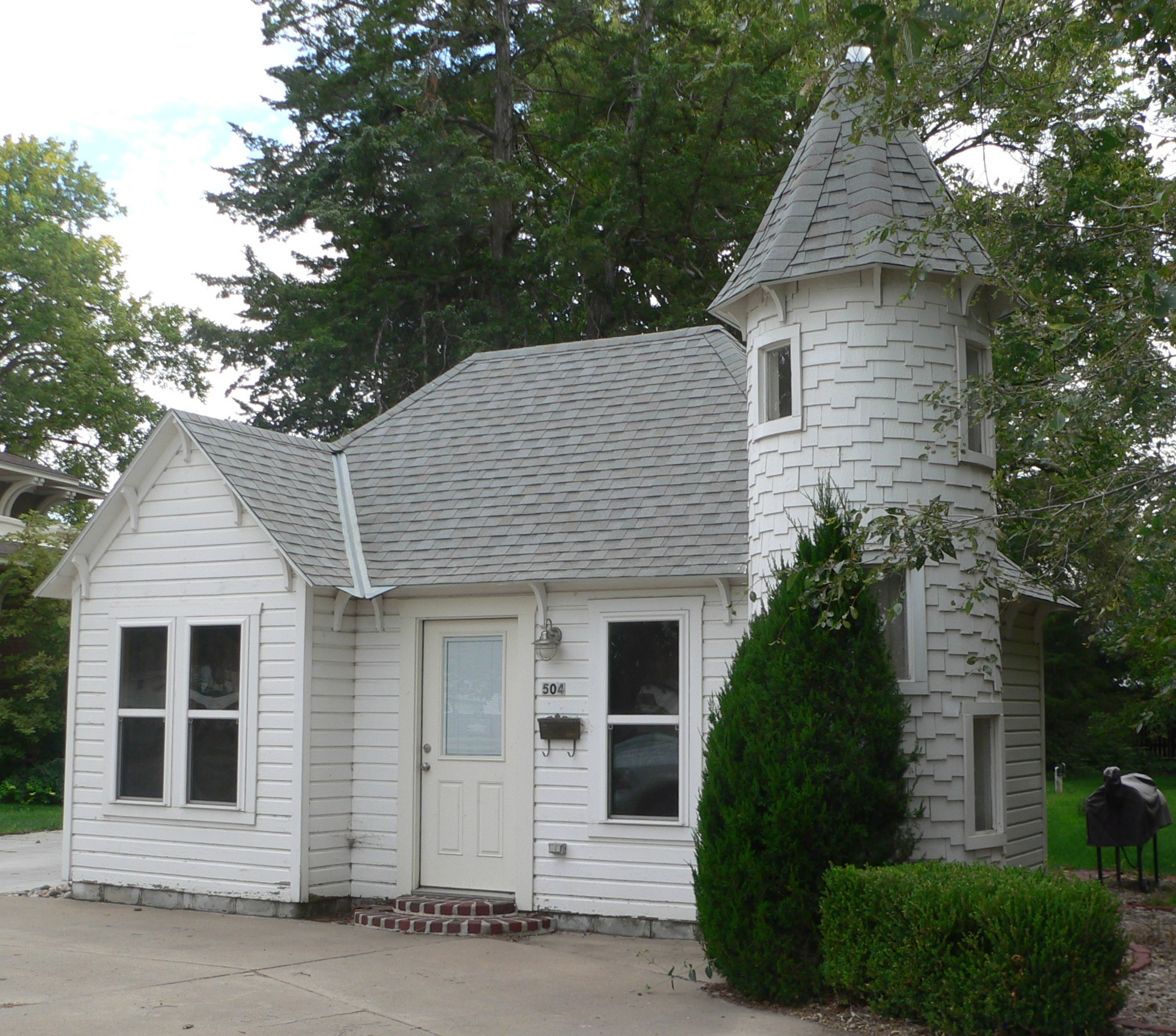
Tower Service Station Building

== See also ==
- Great Flood of 1951
- List of sundown towns in the United States
