= San Ignacio, Paraguay =

San Ignacio
- City and district
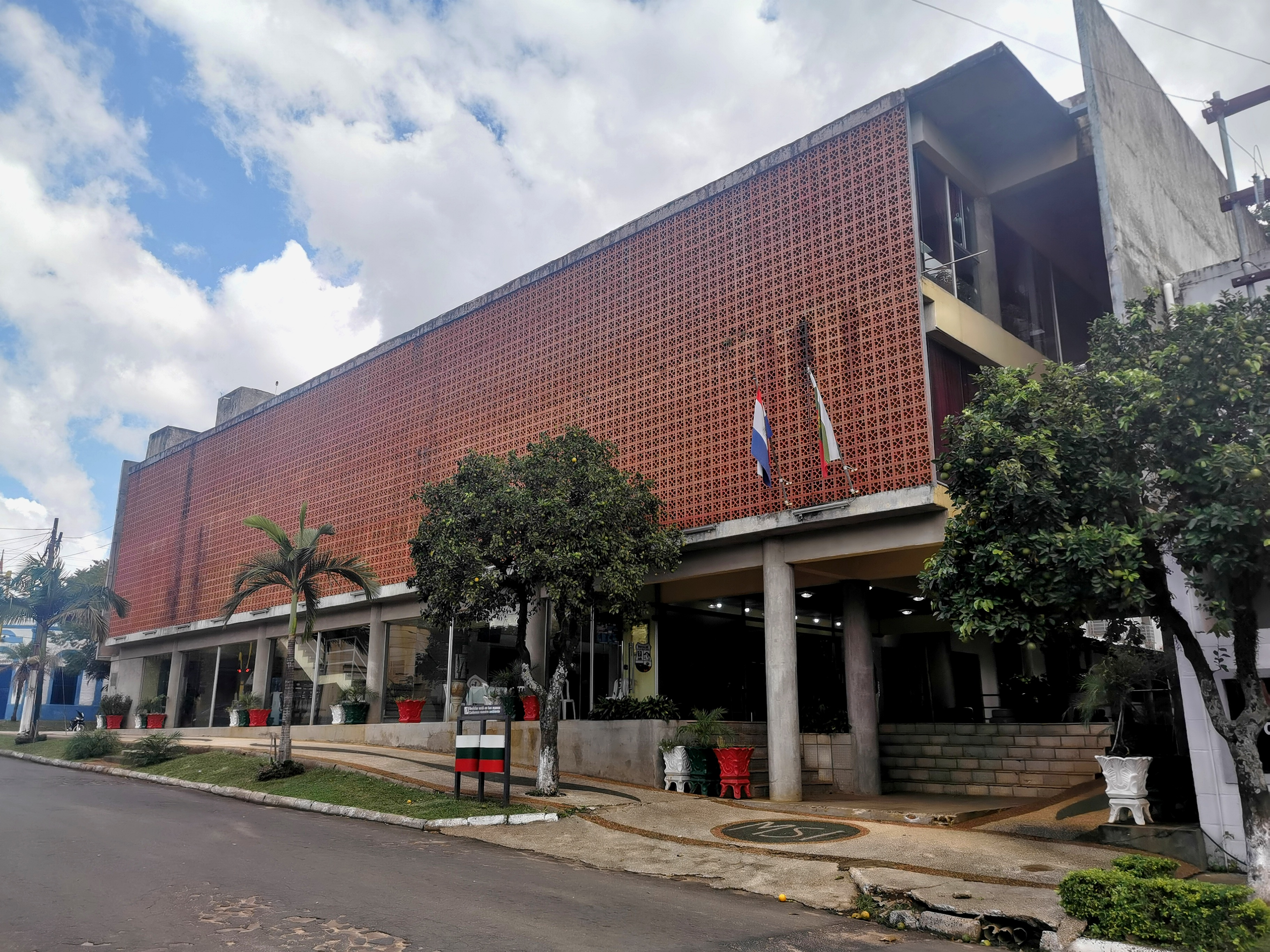
- San Ignacio Guazú city hall, Southern Paraguay

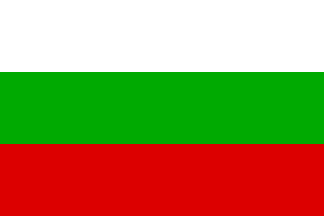
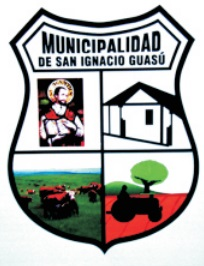
- Flag Seal

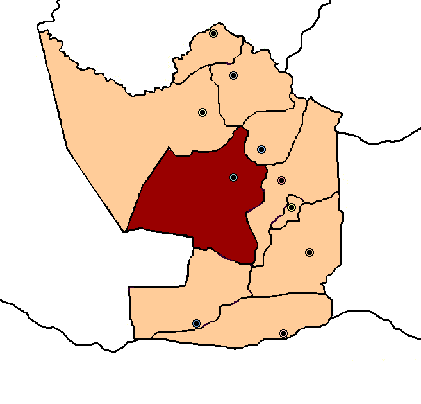
- Location in the Misiones Department

- Location in Paraguay
- Coordinates: 26°53′12″S 57°01′42″W
- Country: Paraguay
- Department: Misiones
- Founded: December 29, 1609; Fathers Marcial de Lorenzana and Francisco de San Martín, helped by the Chief Arapysandú

Government
  - Intendant: Cristina Ayala Blanco (ANR)

Area
  - Total: 2,020 km^{2} (780 sq mi)
- Elevation: 124 m (407 ft)

Population (Est. 2025)
  - Total: 38,489
  - Density: 19.1/km^{2} (49.3/sq mi)
- Demonym: Ignaciano/a
- Time zone: -4 Gmt
- Postal code: 4750
- Area code: +595 (782)
- Website: www.sanignacioguazu.gov.py

San Ignacio (Spanish pronunciation: [san iɣˈnasjo]), also known as San Ignacio Guazú, is a district and city of the Misiones Department of Paraguay, located 225 kilometres (140 mi) from Asunción.
It is Misiones' most-populous and fastest growing city, with an estimated 38,489 residents in 2025. San Ignacio is known as the "Corazón del Sur" ("Heart of the South") for being in the center of the three southern departments: Ñeembucú, Misiones and Itapúa.

== History ==
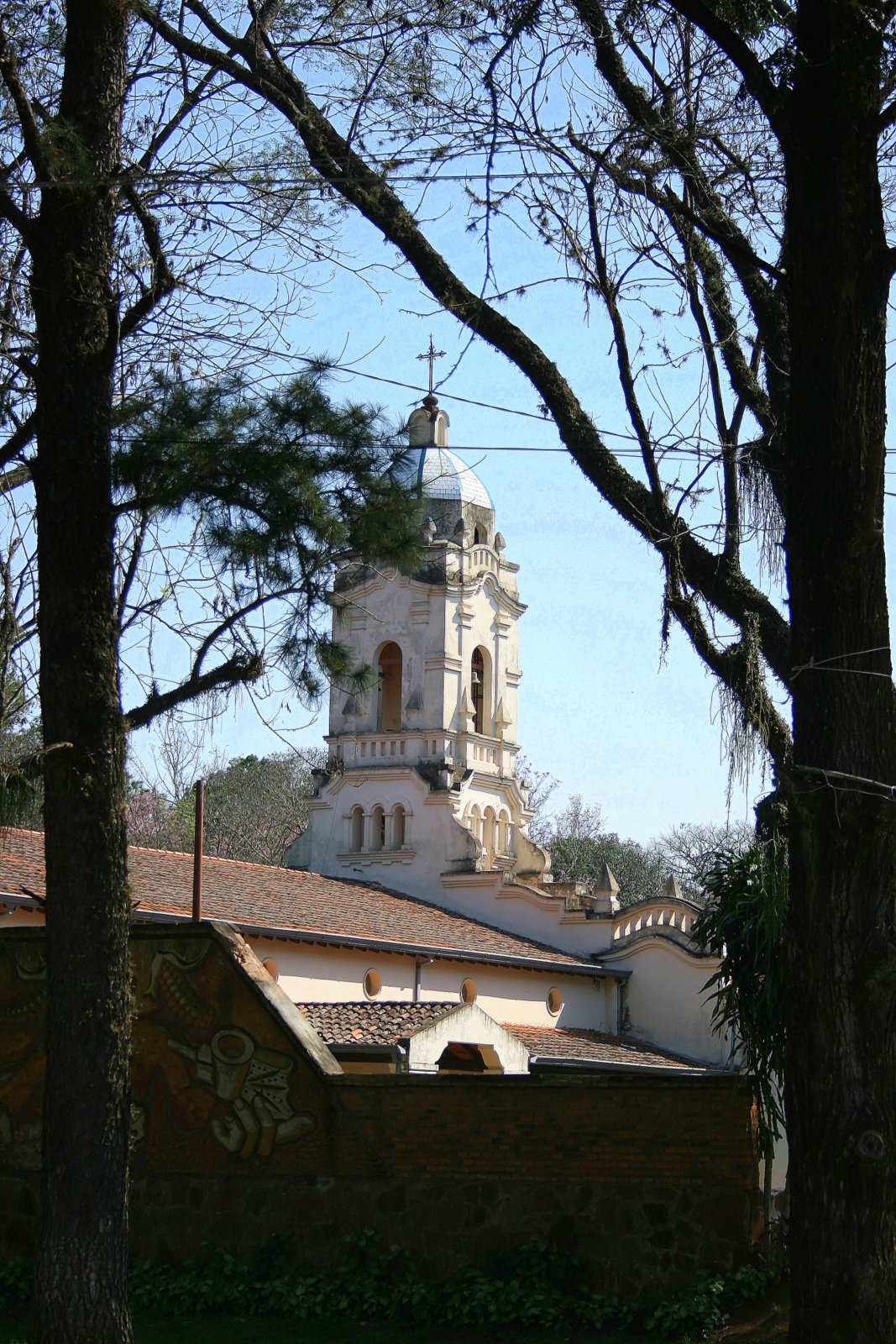
The San Ignacio Cathedral, Misiones, Paraguay

It was founded on December 29, 1609 by the Jesuit Priests Marcial de Lorenzana and Francisco de San Martín, accompany by Cacique (native word for “chief”) Arapysandú, who took them to his lands, where they built an altar and celebrated the first mass.

The Jesuit Mission was established officially in 1610 with the name of “San Ignacio Guazú” so it wouldn't be confused with another mission “San Ignacio Miní” in Misiones, Argentina. In February of the same year, Father Roque González de Santa Cruz organized the mission, turning it into the center of all the Jesuit missions in Paraguay. The Jesuits that founded other towns such as: Santa Rosa, Santiago, Santa María, San Cosme y Damián and even Encarnación, left from San Ignacio in order to do so.

Originally located in the area where nowadays is Santa Rita, moved to Santiago and later to the current location.

The first inhabitants of San Ignacio were the natives that learned many arts from the European masters.

== Economy ==
San Ignacio is an important center for commerce, cattle and agriculture, besides from the historical and cultural richness. His strategic location, in the central area of the department and with several road sections, its population is the one with the most dynamic and economical activity of the department.

== Tourism ==
It is considered “Capital of the Hispanic-Guaraní Baroque”, because of the countless pieces of art from that time that is preserve in the city. Some of them are pieces of the church of San Ignacio.

In the Diocesan Museum of Jesuit Art, that is from the time of the Spanish colony, are found statues of saints and objects of great value and variety, plus documents and maps from the first Jesuit mission in Paraguay. This museum is directed by the priests of the Company of Jesus, and it is organized in four halls:

- The Creation (allegory: The Word of God, the fight between Good and Evil, and an image of a child guided by an Angel of the Creation)
- The Redemption (statues of the passion, death and resurrection of Jesus)
- History of Christ in the Church (images of saints)
- Jesuit Company (recreation of the history of the company that founded the missions)

Other historical places are the Museum of the Chaco Heroes “Museo Semblanza de Héroes” that has a collection of objects from the War of Chaco and the Paraguayan War. The House of Culture, a house from the time of the colony, is an example of the architecture of the period. One of these houses is now the Documentation Center of “Files of the Dictatorial Government of Stroessner / House of the Victims 1954-1989, and is located across from the church.

Every year, in January, the festivity of the Missioner Tradition is celebrated, in which are exhibited the folkloric traditions of the country, the ability for riding horses and the food. The most typical food in the area is the “batiburrillo”.

In Tañarandy, a company of the city, the front of the houses is usually painted with illustrations of the work their inhabitants do. In this place settled the natives that didn't allowed to be dominated by the Jesuit, the name means “land of the demons” or “land of the heretic”.

A tradition of the inhabitants is that the Holy Friday, at sunset, a great procession march with candles, reliving one of the oldest catholic rituals, the singing and the “jetopa” (Guaraní word for “gathering”) of the people in the Stations of the Cross. Tourist from all around the country as well as other from outside come around this date to see “the living pictures”, when local actors represent famous painting in a special scenography. This activity was promoted by the Paraguayan artist Koki Ruíz, and has the support of the entire community of San Ignacio.

On May 15, it is celebrated a festivity in honor of San Isidro Labrador, in the neighborhood that carries his name. On July 31 is the festivity of San Ignacio.

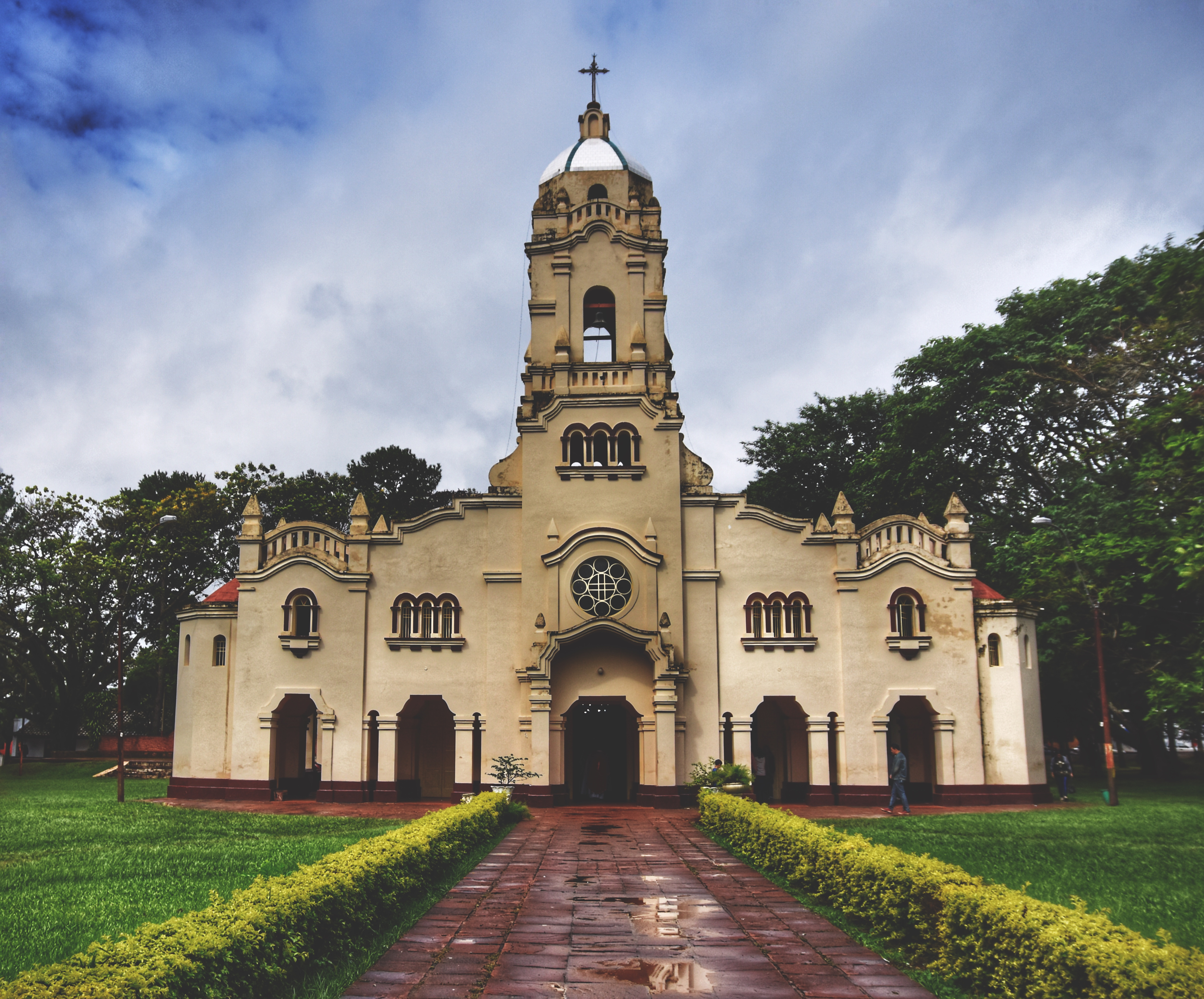
The church of San Ignacio

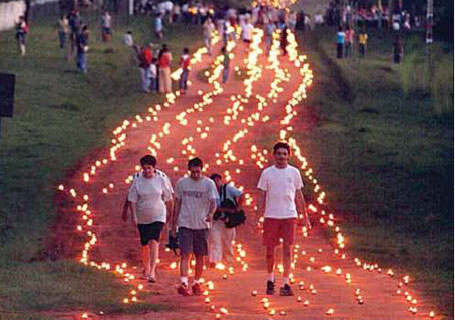
Good Friday procession in Tañarandy, Paraguay

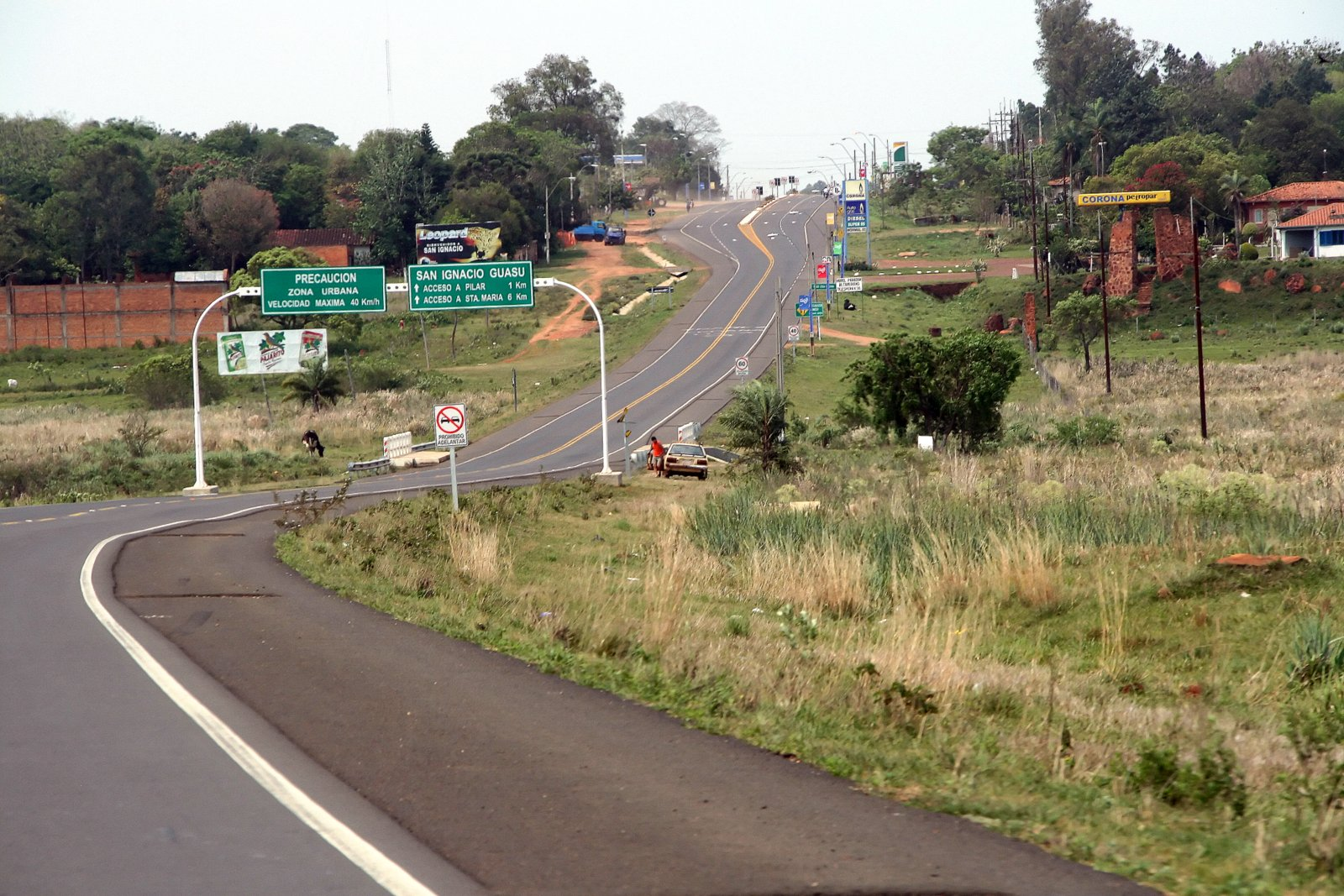
Route 1 approaching San Ignacio, Paraguay

== Education ==
In San Ignacio, the campus of the Universidad Católica Nuestra Señora de la Asunción (Catholic University of Our Lady of the Ascension) offers the young people studies of: Science of Education, Law and Social Sciences, Administration, Accounting and Informatics Engineering. There is also a national university, the Universidad Nacional de Pilar and many others privates universities such as UniNorte, UTCD, UPAP, Universidad Autónoma del Sur, Universidad Maria Auxiliadora, Universidad del Pacífico among others.

=== List of high schools ===
Institution name	Type	Religious	Shift	Secondary educ.		Website
Institution name	Type	Religious	Shift	Bachillerato Científico	Bachillerato Técnico	Website
Centro Educativo Agroecológico San Isidro Labrador	PS		Boarding	No	Agropecuario	
Colegio Jesús de Nazareth	PR		Night	Yes	No	
Colegio Nacional Augusto Roa Bastos	PU		Morning	Yes	No	
Colegio Nacional Don Julio Afara	PU		Morning	Yes	No	
Colegio Nacional Egidio Ruiz Aranda	PU		Afternoon	Yes	No	Web site
Colegio Nacional Martin Rolón	PU		Afternoon	Yes	No	
Colegio Nacional Padre Luis Parola	PU		Night	Yes	No	
Colegio Nacional Prof. Dr. Luis María Argaña	PU		Morning	Yes	No	
Colegio Nacional San Ignacio de Loyola	PU		Morning, afternoon	No	Contabilidad; Informática	
Colegio Nacional San Ignacio	PU		Night	Yes	No	
Colegio Nacional San Javier	PU		Morning	Yes	No	
Colegio Nacional Santa Rita	PU		Afternoon	Yes	No	
Colegio Nacional de EMD Don Rigoberto Caballero	PU		Morning, afternoon, night	Yes	Contabilidad; Electricidad; Mecánica General	Web site
Colegio San Vicente de Paúl	PS	Catholic	Morning	Yes	Informática	
Eco Colegio Paraguay	PR		Morning, afternoon	No	Salud	Web site
Liceo Nacional Comandante Eduardo Ramirez	PU		Morning	Yes	No	

== Media ==
=== Television Networks/Cable Station ===
- Telefuturo: Channel 5
- SNT: Channel 10
- Canal 13 (from San Patricio): Channel 13
- Red Guaraní: Channel 40

=== FM Radio Stations ===
- 95.3 FM: Activa
- 93.3 FM: Del Sol
- 96.3 FM: Libertad
- 88.1 FM: Monseñor Pastor Bogarín
- 89.7 FM: San Ignacio
- 93.7 FM: UNASUR
- 96.3 FM: Libertad

=== AM Radio Stations ===
- 1040 AM: Arapysandú

== Notable people ==
- Carlos Guirland (1961-), footballer
- Darío Verón (1979-), footballer
- Enrique Borja (1995-), footballer
- Feliciano Centurión (1962-1996), painter
- José Pedrozo (1982-2021), footballer

== Twin towns ==
San Ignacio Guazú is twinned with:

- San Ignacio, Argentina
