= St. Joseph's Church and Parochial School =

Historic church in Kansas, United States

- U.S. National Register of Historic Places
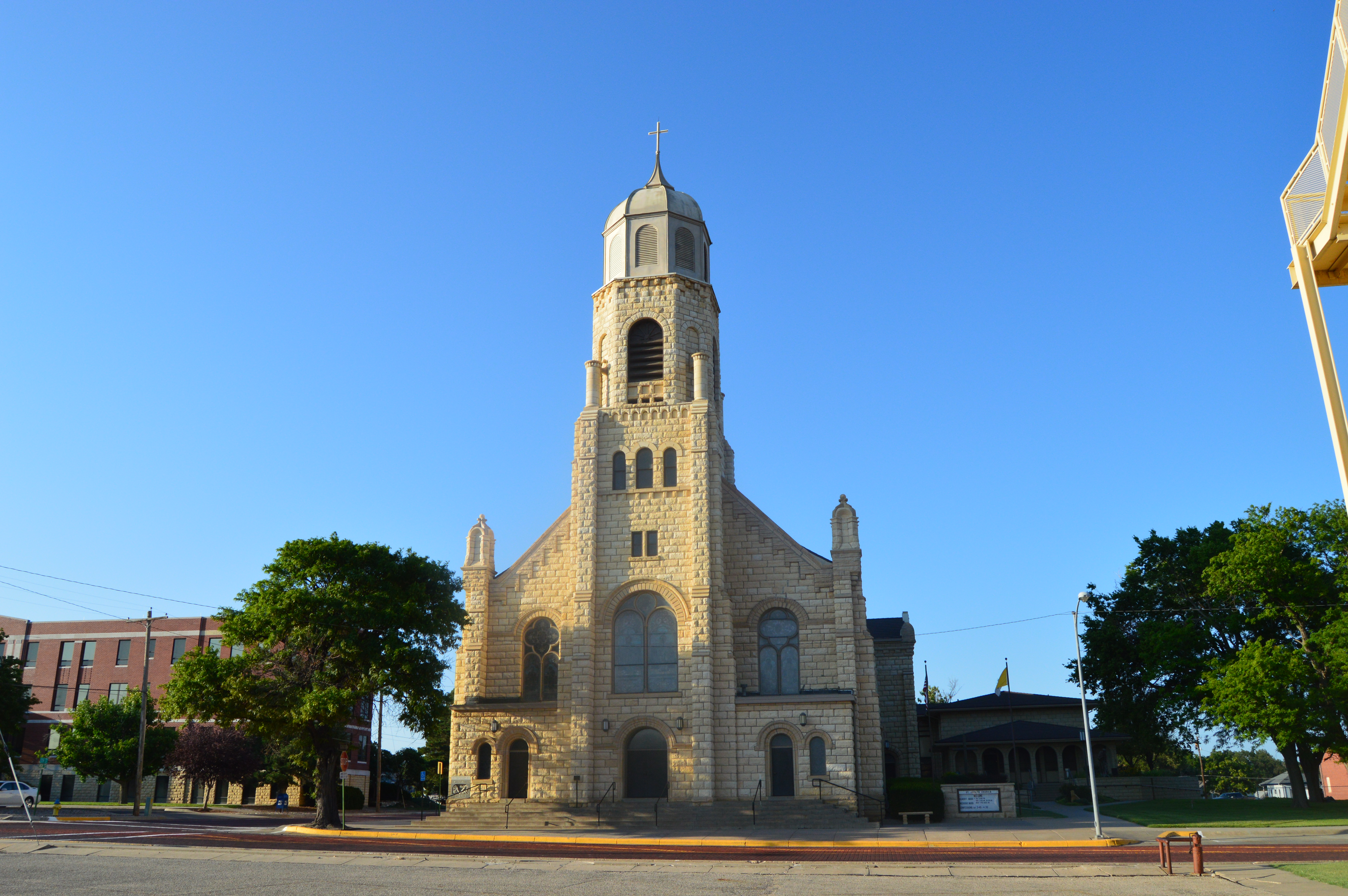

- Location within Kansas Location within the United States
- Location: 210 W. 13th and 217 W. 13th, Hays, Kansas
- Coordinates: 38°52′29″N 99°19′55″W
- Area: 6 acres (2.4 ha)
- Built: 1904
- Architect: Joseph Marshall
- Architectural style: Romanesque
- NRHP reference No.: 08001066
- Added to NRHP: November 19, 2008

The St. Joseph's Church and Parochial School in Hays, Kansas is a historic church and school at 210 W. 13th and 217 W. 13th. They were added to the National Register in 2008.

Listed are the St. Joseph's Church and the St. Joseph's Parochial School across the street, but not another school building. The church is a two-and-a-half-story built in 1904. The school is a three-and-a-half-story limestone building.
