= José Pedrozo =

Paraguayan footballer (1982–2021)

Personal information
- Full name: José Félix Pedrozo Bogarín
- Date of birth: 21 April 1982
- Place of birth: San Ignacio, Paraguay
- Date of death: 15 February 2021 (aged 38)
- Place of death: San Ignacio, Paraguay
- Height: 1.82 m (6 ft 0 in)
- Position: Defender

Senior career*
Years	Team	Apps	(Gls)
2004	Sol de América		
2005	Olimpia		
2006	América Mineiro		
2006–2009	Deportes Antofagasta		
2009	Ñublense		
2010	Rangers de Talca		
2011–2015	San Marcos de Arica		
- * Club domestic league appearances and goals

José Félix Pedrozo Bogarín (21 April 1982 – 15 February 2021) was a Paraguayan footballer who played as a defender.

== Death ==
Pedrozo died in a car accident on 15 February 2021.
