= Liliana Maresca =

Argentine artist (1951–1994)

- Born: Liliana Maresca; 8 May 1951; Avellaneda, Buenos Aires, Argentina
- Died: 13 November 1994 (aged 43); Buenos Aires, Argentina

Signature
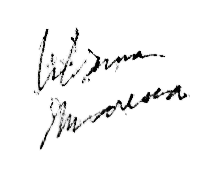

Liliana Maresca (May 8, 1951 – November 13, 1994) was an Argentine artist. Her works cover a variety of styles including sculpture, painting, graphic montages art objects and installations. She was a prominent artist in the period following the dictatorship of the National Reorganization Process. She was a key figure who participated in the artistic scene since the early 80's, starring the enthusiastic young bohemian that detonated Buenos Aires from the early years of democracy rapidly becoming an inflection figure. Her works included objects, installations, performances, interventions in public and semipublic places, and the photographic performances. Maresca died of AIDS in 1994, just a few days after the opening of her retrospective at the Centro Cultural Recoleta in Buenos Aires.

== Biography ==
Liliana Maresca was born in Argentina on May 8, 1951 into a middle class family. Little is known about her early childhood, other than that by the age of nineteen, she was living on her own in Belgrano, Buenos Aires. She studied at the Escuela Nacional de Cerámica, the National School of Ceramics in Mexico. Maresca always opted to show her works of sculptures and installations in unconventional settings and with unexpected materials. For example, Maresca organized the group show Lavarte at a laundromat. She was considered to be the "cultural communicator of the eighties" by her peer Marcia Schvartz (b.1955) because of how she created sculptures and installations that broke free from artistic expectations. She later became a professor in the graphic design department at the University of Buenos Aires (UBA) and directed her own plastic arts workshops. Her first collective exhibition was around 1983 at Espacio Giesso in Buenos Aires. Her house in San Telmo hosted a community of Argentinian artists and local cultural or artistic events.

She died in Buenos Aires in 1994 at the age of 43 from causes related to the HIV virus, while she was preparing a retrospective exhibition.

== Education ==
Liliana Maresca studied painting at the Escuele Nacional de Cerámica with Renato Benedetti, drawing with Miguel Angel Bengochea, and sculpturing with Emilio Renart. She later became a professor in the graphic design department at the University of Buenos Aires (UBA) and directed her own plastic arts workshops.

== Art works ==
Liliana Maresca's first public artistic appearance was in 1983 when she took part in a group exhibition at Estudio Giesso. A short time later she presented her first solo exhibition at El Porteño magazine. In this solo exhibition, Maresca was photographed by Argentinian photographer Marcos Lopez. These photographs show Maresca posing nude with a white mask. Some have interpreted this work as a commentary on both race and gender, with the white mask complicating Maresca's Latina identity. Additionally, the mask obstructs her face, giving the viewer access only to her nude figure.

A year later in 1984, she participated in Kriptonita verde, an exhibition prepared by the Museo Juan Carlos Castagnino in Mar del Plata.

In 1985, two important happenings mark the career of Lialiana Maresca. Along with Ezequiel Furgiuele, with whom she formed Grupo Haga, Maresca made a scarf measuring 328 feet long, composed of rags found in the neighborhood of El Once; the work was titled Una bufanda para la ciudad de Buenos Aires (A scarf for the city of Buenos Aires). That same year, she also organized a group show entitled Lavarte meaning "wash yourself" in an automatic laundrette in Bartolomé Mitre Street.

Liliana Maresca was a key figure who participated in the artistic scene since the early 80's, starring the enthusiastic young bohemian that detonated Buenos Aires from the early years of democracy rapidly becoming an inflection figure, which initiates and develops many of the avant-garde that characterize the art of 90's. Documents of installations and performances convey a comprehensive panorama of an artistic production that spanned the period between 1983 and 1993.

In 1990, the artist presented the installation Recolecta (Collects), which had the main theme of shopping cart like those pushed by vagrants on city streets where she created replicas of the carts that she called a "national symbol". Painted all white or in gold and silver, the carts were meant to critique the suffering of the socially marginalized. A year after, at 1991, she exhibited Ouróboros, an object made ip of unbound books forming the mythical serpent that devours itself, at the Facultad de Filosofía y Letras.

In 1992, her most conceptual work was created with the installation of Espacio disponible (Space available) at the Centro Cultural Recoleta. For this piece Maresca placed a signboard advertising the availability of the space "for any purposes" and included her name and telephone number and two dates. A few months later and with the help of colleagues, Maresca published in El Libertino fourteen erotic photographs of herself under a title suggesting a connection to the ad she had earlier presented and again including her name and telephone number. Both works revealed her interest in the performativity of the language of advertising and the expectations placed on the artist as a maker of objects and fantasies.

== Performance ==
Her body of works includes painting, objects, sculptures, installations, performances. Her artworks reflected the neo-dada spirit, the minimalist models, and the conceptual strategies that dominated the art scene in the second half of the century in Argentina.

== Photography ==
From a post-avantgarde, post-utopian point of view, all the paradoxical, body- and object-based photo-performances which Liliana Maresca was associated and obsessed since the 1980s and through her death in 1994. In 1982, Marcos Lopez, photographer from Argentina, began to frequent Liliana's place. Over the next year, he made a series of black and white photographs. In those shots, Maresca was completely naked, surrounded by and interacting with her own artworks, granting each one of them a particular meaning. The object entitled “Carozo de durazno (Peach pit)” – an oversized vagina molded in foam rubber – appears in another image tenderly cradled in the arms of the artist, an ironic suggestion of how to treat the intimate female body. In the series Maresca se entrega a todo destino (Maresca surrenders to any destiny) strategies and contents are concatenated with the installation entitled Espacio Disponible (Available space) (1992). The erotic performance was made to be published in the October issue of the El Libertino magazine in 1993. In 1993 the Maresca-López duo reunites again to perform the latest photo shots, which were commissioned for the posters and postcard of the exhibition invitation Imagen pública – altas esferas (Public image - High spheres). The shooting took place in Liliana Maresca's house along with the oversized prints of images from Página 12 newspaper produced to create and constitute such installation. Above them, Maresca lies naked in sexy attitudes and Lopez, from a mezzanine took zenithal photos. The latest series is a derivation of the work Imagen pública – altas esferas (Public image - High spheres). With the gigantographies, big scale prints, used to constitute the installation, the artist recreated a new installation in the east end of the Ecological Reserve located in the Costanera Sur of Buenos Aires.

The impulse to show and exhibit herself (overexposure) for the register of the other's gaze had to do with a strongly existential content: to "show herself" in order to "be." In that sense, the use of the body as alternative surface to the sheet of paper of the canvas, was equivalent to a new neo-romantic strategy intended to get her engaged, through different means, with the surrounding world.

== Selected solo exhibitions ==
1984: Objects. Drafting of the magazine El Porteño, Buenos Aires.

1985: A scarf for the City of Buenos Aires. Performance with Ezequiel Furgiuele, Viamonte and Florida streets, Buenos Aires. Myths of the Silver. Objects and sculptures, together with Ezequiel Furgiuele, Adriana Indik Gallery, Buenos Aires.

1989: Not all that glitters is gold. Sculptures Adriana Indik Gallery, Buenos Aires.What the wind took, La Cochambre. Installation. Gallery of the Ricardo Rojas Cultural Center, University of Buenos Aires.

1990: Objects and Sculptures. Centoira Gallery, Buenos Aires. Collect. Installation. Recoleta Cultural Center, Buenos Aires.

1991: Wotán - Vulcano. Installation. Recoleta Cultural Center, Buenos Aires.

1992: Available space. Installation. Casal de Cataluña, Buenos Aires.

1993: Public image - High spheres. Installation. Recoleta Cultural Center, Buenos Aires.

1994 : Liliana Maresca: photoperformances, records & tributes

1994: Frenzy. Retrospective 1984 -1994. Recoleta Cultural Center, Buenos Aires.

2008: Transmutations. Retrospective Castagnino Museum, Rosario / Recoleta Cultural Center, Buenos Aires.

2008: Liliana Maresca : Transmutaciones, Museo Municipal de Bellos Artes Juan B. Castognino, Rosaria, Argentina

2012: Liliana Maresca Un'identità multiforme. Spazio Nuovo Gallery, Rome.

== Selected group exhibitions ==
1981: Plástica abierta a los jóvenes. Grupo TAF, Galería Krass, Buenos Aires.

1983: La belleza-fealdad de lo cotidiano. Objetos. Estudio Giesso, Buenos Aires.

1985: Depositarte. El depósito, Buenos Aires. Liquidarte. Casa Puerta Roja, Buenos Aires. Pintura Joven. Zona Joven, Buenos Aires. Ambientación y objetos. Galería 264, Buenos Aires. Lavarte, en una lavandería automática. Escultura, pintura y fotografía. Buenos Aires

1988: Madres y Artistas” (Liliana Maresca, Elba Bairon y Marcia Schvartz). Esculturas. Museo de Bahía Blanca, provincia de Buenos Aires. Mitominas 2. Los mitos de la Sangre. Esculturas. C.C. de Bs. As. (Hoy Recoleta).

1992: La Madera en el Arte. Escultura. Centro Cultural Recoleta, Buenos Aires. Homenaje a Batato Barea. Objeto. Centro Cultural Ricardo Rojas, Buenos Aires.

1995: Juego de Damas. Objetos. Centro Cultural Recoleta, Buenos Aires. Zen y Arte. Escultura. Espacio Giesso, Buenos Aires. El peronismo y su tiempo. Objeto. Biblioteca Nacional, Buenos Aires.

1999: Arte de Acción. Museo de Arte Moderno de Buenos Aires.

2005: Rituales. Casa Brandon, Buenos Aires. Estado de Malestar. Museo de Arte Contemporáneo de Rosario (Macro)

2010: Feria internacional de arte contemporáneo Arte BA, Buenos Aires.

2013: Buenos Aires. Objeto. Fundación Proa, Buenos Aires

2014: Perder la forma humana, Una imagen sísmica de los años ochenta en América Latina. Fotos y Objeto. Museo Nacional Centro de Arte Reina Sofía de Madrid. Museo de Lima. Centro de Arte Contemporáneo de UNTREF y Parque de la Memoria, Buenos Aires.

== Other activities ==
1984: Ciclo de los Barrios. Ambientación. Teatro auditorio de Buenos Aires. No se haga el distraído: el sándwich es Usted. Film de Marcelo Franco. Escenografía y máscaras. Festival Nacional de Cine Súper 8. UNCIPAR. Villa Gesell.

1985: En la ciudad de Cuzco, Perú, realiza experiencias plásticas con la antropóloga Clemencia Aramburu.

El teatro en Emeterio Cerro y su intermedio. Galería Adriana Indik y Teatro Espacios, Buenos Aires.

Ecogógicas. Ambientación para la Obra teatral de Emeterio Cerro. Ambientación. Teatro General San Martín, Buenos Aires.

La Magdalena del Ojón. Ambientación para la obra teatral de Emeterio Cerro. Teatro Espacios. Buenos Aires.

El mundo de las bestias. Ambientación para la obra teatral de Omar Chabán. Discoteca Cemento, Buenos Aires.

Ambientación, Paladium discothèque, Buenos Aires. V Marcha de la resistencia. Madres de Plaza de Mayo, Buenos

1988: La Invencible. Vestuario y escenografía. Obra de teatro dirigida por Omar Chabán. Discoteca Cemento, Buenos Aires.

1993: Maresca se entrega, todo destino. Performance fotográfica revista El Libertino. N° 8, Buenos Aires.
