= Santa Rosa, Paraguay =

City and district in Misiones, Paraguay

Santa Rosa de Lima
- City & District
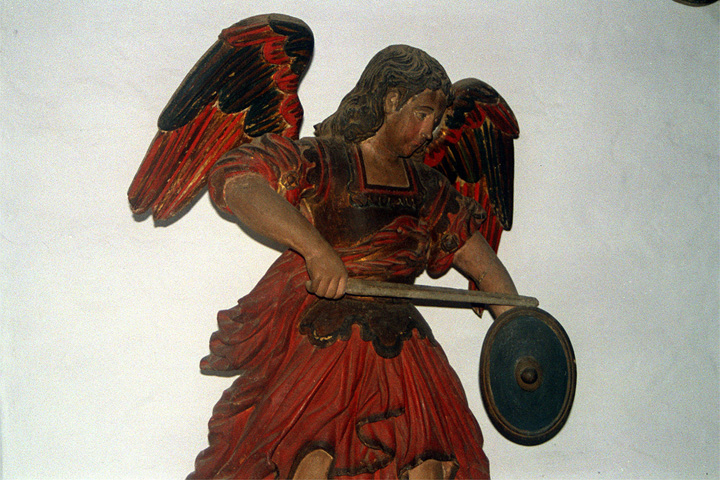
- Santa Rosa de Lima image in the Jesuit Church.

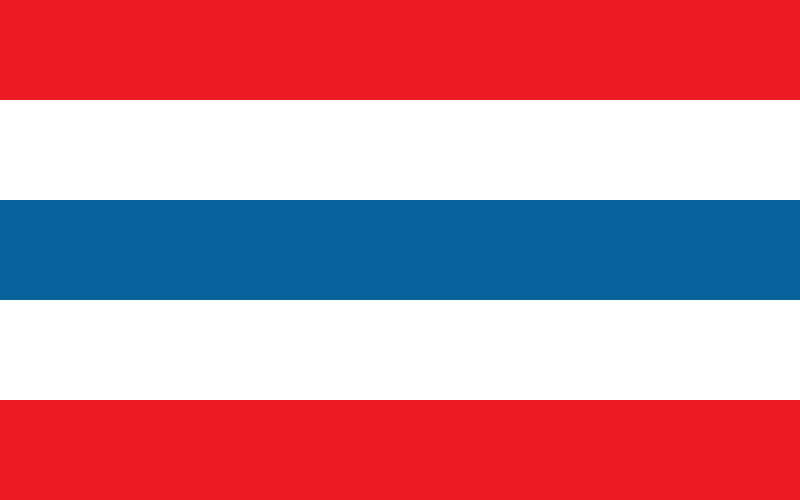
- Flag

- Location within Paraguay
- Coordinates: 26°52′00″S 56°51′00″W
- Country: Paraguay
- Department: Misiones
- Foundation: 1698 by Father Ranzonier

Government
  - Intendente Municipal: Ruben Alfonso Jacquet Godoy

Area
  - Total: 1.010 km^{2} (0.390 sq mi)
- Elevation: 142 m (466 ft)

Population (2008)
  - Total: 20,306
  - Density: 17.4/km^{2} (45/sq mi)
- Time zone: -4 GMT
- Postal code: 4890
- Area code: (595) (858)

Santa Rosa (Spanish pronunciation: [ˈsanta ˈrosa]) is a city and district located in the Misiones department in Paraguay. It is one of the most important cities of Jesuit influence.

== Geography ==
Santa Rosa stands on a hill located 257 kilometres (160 mi) south of Asunción on Route I "Mariscal Francisco Solano Lopez".

== Weather ==
In summer, the highest temperature reaches 39 °C (102 °F), the lowest in winter usually runs about 0 °C (32 °F). The annual average is 21 °C (70 °F).

== Demography ==
Santa Rosa has a population of 20,306 inhabitants, of whom 10,582 are men and 9,723 are women, according to projections by the General Directorate of Statistics, Census and Surveys.

== History ==
The city was founded in 1698 by Jesuit Priest Ranzonier, and it was settled by families coming from the city of Santa Maria de Fe. Today, one of the most important Jesuit Reductions of Paraguay is a tourist attraction there.

The original church was burned in 1883 and only the original bell was preserved. To this day the bell is still in use, as part of the newer temple built on the site.

== Economy ==
Santa Rosa is an agricultural area, with large cattle ranches.

== Tourism ==
Sightseeing and historic Santa Rosa:

- Our Lady of Loreto Chapel: Built in times of missions, retains important features of the colonial era.
- Church of Santa Rosa de Lima, the first saint of the Americas, ornamentation and decoration recreate the Jesuit style.
- The Santa Rosa Jesuit Museum and the Museum of Loreto Chapel.
- At the side of the Central Square of the Bell Tower stands 20 metres (66 ft) high, built in red stone, one of the most important buildings of the Jesuit times.
- The House of Indians is a sample of past Jesuits and preserves the integrity with some old houses converted into shops. Some are observed colonial buildings.
- At the center of the Plaza Mariscal Estigarribia is a source with historical monuments, surrounded by figures carved in stone, highlights the particular figure of Kurupí, character of mythology, created by the artist Koki Ruiz.
- A large block of stone oscillating, at the side of the Hill, at the height of the Company on May 3, is a natural monument, "Itá Balanze."
- The Pombero Pyporé, a stone miraculously held vertically, where crisp, you can see a footprint said to be "Pombero".
- The stream Sangurí is very busy in the summer.

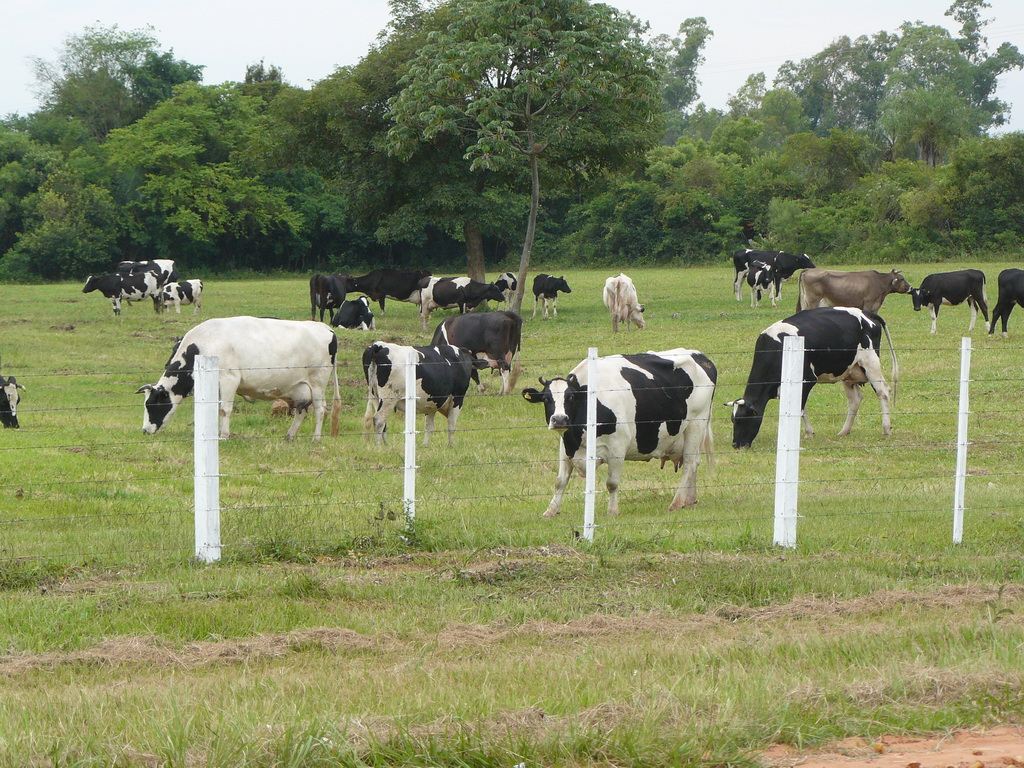
Cattle
