= Hays Regional Airport =

- IATA: HYS; ICAO: KHYS; FAA LID: HYS

Summary
- Airport type: Public
- Owner: City of Hays
- Serves: Hays, Kansas
- Elevation AMSL: 1,999 ft (609 m)
- Coordinates: 38°50′32″N 099°16′23″W
- Website: www.FlyHays.com

Map
- Location within Kansas Location within the United States

Runways
Direction	Length		Surface
Direction	ft	m	Surface
16/34	6,501	1,982	Concrete
4/22	4,501	1,372	Concrete

Statistics
- Aircraft operations (2021): 31,329
- Based aircraft (2022): 35
- Departing passengers (12 months ending September 2021): 8,990
- Source: Federal Aviation Administration

Hays Regional Airport (IATA: HYS, ICAO: KHYS, FAA LID: HYS) is three miles southeast of Hays, in Ellis County, Kansas, United States. It is used for general aviation and is home to one airline, United Express.

The National Plan of Integrated Airport Systems for 2021–2025 categorized it as a non-primary commercial service airport (between 2,500 and 10,000 enplanements per year).

In the 1950s the airport was known as the Hays Municipal Airport and located in the half-mile square whose southeast corner was at East 13th Street and Canterbury Drive. The current airport opened around 1960 with a 4000-ft runway.

== Historical airline service ==
Central Airlines began flights to the original Hays airport in 1961. Hays was one of several stops on a route between Denver and Kansas City. Douglas DC-3 aircraft were first used and service was soon moved to the present airport. Central later upgraded with Convair 240 and Convair 600 aircraft before merging into Frontier Airlines in 1967. Frontier flew Convair 580 aircraft along the same route until service ended in early 1977.

Air Midwest served Hays from 1969 through 2007 using Beechcraft 99 and Fairchild Swearingen Metroliner II aircraft. The carrier provided commuter flights to Denver, Kansas City, and Wichita, most flights made one or more stops en route. From 1986 through 1988 Air Midwest operated as Eastern Express on behalf of Eastern Airlines and from 1988 through 1989 their service operated as Braniff Express on behalf of Braniff (1983-1990). From late 1989 through early 1991 Air Midwest operated under their own branding before beginning a third code share partnership as US Airways Express on behalf of US Airways with flights to Kansas City. The service as US Airways Express lasted until 2007 when all service ended. Air Midwest had switched to using Beechcraft 1900D aircraft in the early 1990s.

United Express, operated by Mesa Airlines provided service to Denver on behalf of United Airlines from 1992 through 1998 using Beechcraft 1900D commuter aircraft.

Great Lakes Airlines then provided service to Denver from 1998 through 2014 using Beechcraft 1900Ds. At first Great Lakes operated as United Express but reverted to its own branding in 2002. From 2007 through 2009 the carrier also provided flights to Kansas City.

The current provider, SkyWest Airlines, operating as United Express, began service to Denver on August 1, 2014, using Bombardier CRJ100/200 regional jets. Service to Chicago O'Hare began later with a stop at Salina, Kansas.

As of February 2025, SkyWest uses Bombardier CRJ-550 regional jets to provide multiple daily flights to Denver.

== Facilities ==
The airport covers 545 acres (221 ha) at an elevation of 1,999 feet (609 m). It has two concrete runways: 16/34 is 6,501 by 100 feet (1,982 x 30 m), rebuilt in 2013, and 4/22 is 4,501 by 75 feet (1,372 x 23 m). Runway 4/22 was built in 2002.

In the year ending December 31, 2021, the airport had 31,329 aircraft operations, an average of 86 per day: 70% general aviation, 25% air taxi, 5% airline and less than 1% military. In February 2025, 40 aircraft were based at this airport: 35 single-engine, 4 multi-engine and 1 helicopter.

== Airline and destinations ==
United Express connects Hays Airport to Denver International Airport.

Destinations map
Destinations from Hays Regional Airport

=== Statistics ===
Carrier shares (November 2023 - October 2024)
Carrier	Passengers (arriving and departing)
SkyWest	26,480(100%)

Top domestic destinations (November 2023 - October 2024)
Rank	Airport	Passengers	Airline
1	Denver International (DEN)	11,210	United
2	Chicago O'hare (ORD)	1,780	United
3	Salina Regional (SLN)	520	United

== See also ==
- List of airports in Kansas
