= Santa María, Paraguay =

Santa María
- District
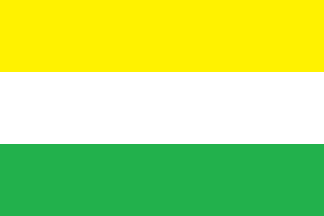
- Flag

- Location in Paraguay
- Coordinates: 26°47′6″S 56°56′24″W
- Country: Paraguay
- Department: Misiones
- Founded: 1647

Government
  - Intendente Municipal: Damián García (PLRA)

Area
  - Total: 520 km^{2} (200 sq mi)
- Elevation: 130 m (430 ft)

Population (2022)
  - Total: 7,481
  - Density: 14/km^{2} (37/sq mi)
- Postal code: 4950
- Area code: (595) (781)

Santa María de Fe is a town and district located in the Misiones Department in Paraguay, located about 15 km from the city of San Ignacio.

== History ==
Father Emmanuel Berthot founded the town in 1647.

The original church structure was destroyed by fire in 1889, though numerous paintings were salvaged from the blaze. A selection of these restored works, alongside various Baroque paintings and wooden sculptures, is preserved and displayed within the present church and adjacent museum.

In 1787, Rev. José Agustín Molas was born in Santa María de Fe, one of the Catholic priests who took part in the independence revolution on 14 and 15 May 1811. Molas is remembered as one of the heroes who helped liberate Paraguay.

The French explorer and botanist, Amado Aimé Bonpland was detained in Santa María until 1829. Whilst he was there, he taught the local population how to cultivate different plants and methods to produce candies and liquors. He married his wife María, a daughter of a cacique, with whom he had two children.

== Geography ==
The district of Santa María de Fe is located in the Eastern Region of Paraguay. It's located 253 km south of Asunción, the capital of the country, one arrives at Santa Maria, taking the National Route Number 1, and then taking a detour between the cities of San Ignacio and Santa Rosa.

== Limits ==
The district of Santa María is bordered by the following districts:

- North: district of San Miguel and the department of Caazapá
- East: district of Santa Rosa
- South: districts of San Ignacio and Santa Rosa
- West: San Ignacio
