= Paraguay at the 2027 Pan American Games =

- IOC code: PAR
- NOC: Paraguayan Olympic Committee

in Lima, Peru 2027 – 2027
- Competitors: 37 in 5 sports
- Medals: Gold 0 Silver 0 Bronze 0 Total 0

Pan American Games appearances (overview)
- 1951; 1955; 1959–1963; 1967; 1971; 1975; 1979; 1983; 1987; 1991; 1995; 1999; 2003; 2007; 2011; 2015; 2019; 2023; 2027

Paraguay is scheduled to compete at the 2027 Pan American Games in Lima, Peru from July 23 to August 8, 2027. This will be Paraguay's 18th appearance at the Pan American Games, having competed at every edition of the games except 1959 and 1963.

== Competitors ==
The following is the list of number of competitors (per gender) participating at the games per sport/discipline.

Sport	Men	Women	Total
Equestrian			2
Fencing	0	1	1
Football	0	18	18
Handball	0	12	12
Squash	0	4	4
Total	0	35	37

== Equestrian ==
Paraguay qualified two equestrians in Jumping at the 2026 South American Games.

=== Jumping ===
Athlete	Horse	Event	Qualification											Final							
Athlete	Horse	Event	Round 1			Round 2.1			Round 2.2			Total		Round A			Round B			Total	
Athlete	Horse	Event	Faults	Result Time	Rank	Faults	Result Time	Rank	Faults	Result Time	Rank	Faults	Rank	Faults	Result Time	Rank	Faults	Result Time	Rank	Faults	Rank
		Individual																			

== Fencing ==
Paraguay qualified one female fencer at the 2026 Pan American Fencing Championships.

Women

Athlete	Event	Pool Round		Round of 16	Quarterfinals	Semifinals	Final	
Athlete	Event	Victories	Seed	Opposition Score	Opposition Score	Opposition Score	Opposition Score	Rank
Montserrat Viveros	Individual épée							

== Football ==
Paraguay qualified a women's team after finishing 5th at the 2025 Copa America Femenina.

Summary

Key:

- A.E.T – After extra time.
- P – Match decided by penalty-shootout.

Team	Event	Group Stage				Semifinal	Final / BM	
Team	Event	Opposition Score	Opposition Score	Opposition Score	Rank	Opposition Score	Opposition Score	Rank
Paraguay women's	Women's tournament							

== Handball ==
Paraguay qualified a women's team after finishing second at the 2026 South American Games.

Summary

Team	Event	Group stage				Semifinal	Final / BM / Pl.	
Team	Event	Opposition Result	Opposition Result	Opposition Result	Rank	Opposition Result	Opposition Result	Rank
Paraguay women	Women's tournament							

== Squash ==
Paraguay qualified a female athlete after her victory at the 2025 Junior Pan American Games. Paraguay qualified a team of three female athletes through the 2026 Pan American Squash Championships.

Women

Athlete	Event	Round of 32	Round of 16	Quarterfinal	Semifinal	Final / BM	
Athlete	Event	Opposition Result	Opposition Result	Opposition Result	Opposition Result	Opposition Result	Rank
Fiorella Gatti	Singles						
	Doubles	—N/a					
	Team	—N/a					
