= Golf at the 2023 Pan American Games – Women's individual =

Golf – Women's individual at the 2023 Pan American Games
- Venue: Prince of Wales Country Club
- Start date: 2 November 2023
- End date: 5 November 2023
- Competitors: 32 from 18 nations
- Winning score: 274 (−14)

Medalists
Gold medal	Sofia García	Paraguay
Silver medal	Mariajo Uribe	Colombia
Bronze medal	Alena Sharp	Canada

The women's individual competition of the golf events at the 2023 Pan American Games was held between 2 and 5 November at the Prince of Wales Country Club in La Reina, Chile.

== Schedule ==
All times are CLST (UTC−4).

Date	Time	Round
2 November 2023	8:00	Round 1
3 November 2023	8:00	Round 2
4 November 2023	8:00	Round 3
5 November 2023	7:00	Round 4/Final

== Results ==
The final results were:

Rank	Name	Nation	Round 1	Round 2	Round 3	Round 4	Total
1st place, gold medalist(s)	Sofia García	Paraguay	65	70	67	72	274 (−14)
2nd place, silver medalist(s)	Mariajo Uribe	Colombia	69	73	68	68	278 (−10)
3rd place, bronze medalist(s)	Alena Sharp	Canada	67	73	70	71	281 (−7)
4	Valery Plata	Colombia	70	70	69	73	282 (−6)
5	Magdalena Simmermacher	Argentina	73	71	71	72	287 (−1)
6	Alexandra Swayne	Virgin Islands	70	72	75	71	288 (E)
7	Anna Davis (a)	United States	73	74	68	75	290 (+2)
8	Isabella Fierro	Mexico	71	72	73	75	291 (+3)
8	Laura Restrepo	Panama	78	74	69	70	291 (+3)
10	Vanessa Gilly	Venezuela	75	72	74	71	292 (+4)
10	Milagros Chaves	Paraguay	73	79	70	70	292 (+4)
10	Maria Torres	Puerto Rico	73	75	71	73	292 (+4)
13	Michelle Melandri	Chile	74	74	72	73	293 (+5)
14	Rachel Heck (a)	United States	78	70	71	77	296 (+8)
15	Valeria Mendizabal	Independent Athletes Team	76	78	72	71	297 (+9)
15	Luisamariana Mesones	Peru	77	73	73	74	297 (+9)
17	Regina Plasencia	Mexico	76	73	71	79	299 (+11)
18	Selena Costabile	Canada	77	76	74	75	302 (+14)
18	Emily Odwin	Barbados	76	76	75	75	302 (+14)
20	Valentina Bosselmann	Brazil	81	75	77	73	306 (+18)
21	Claudia Perazzo	Venezuela	73	78	74	82	307 (+19)
22	Sofia Blanco	Bolivia	75	79	74	81	309 (+21)
22	Carolina Alcaino	Chile	77	74	76	82	309 (+21)
24	Lúa Pousa	Panama	77	77	79	77	310 (+22)
25	Anika Veintemilla	Ecuador	78	76	79	80	313 (+25)
26	Valentina Rossi	Argentina	74	78	86	78	316 (+28)
27	Maria Marques	Uruguay	83	85	75	75	317 (+29)
27	Chloe Stevenazzi	Uruguay	79	79	78	81	317 (+29)
29	Camila Zignaigo	Peru	86	84	76	75	321 (+33)
29	Emma Baier	Ecuador	79	78	85	79	321 (+33)
31	Maria Jose Savoca	Bolivia	83	81	78	80	322 (+34)
32	Luiza Altmann	Brazil	83	83	77	82	325 (+37)

(a) denotes an amateur
