= Paraguay at the 2023 Pan American Games =

- IOC code: PAR
- NOC: Paraguayan Olympic Committee

in Santiago, Chile 20 October 2023 – 5 November 2023
- Competitors: 117 in 22 sports
- Flag bearers (opening): Derlis Ayala & Agua Marina Espínola
- Flag bearers (closing): Fabrizio Zanotti & Sofia Garcia
- Medals Ranked 21st: Gold 1 Silver 0 Bronze 6 Total 7

Pan American Games appearances (overview)
- 1951; 1955; 1959–1963; 1967; 1971; 1975; 1979; 1983; 1987; 1991; 1995; 1999; 2003; 2007; 2011; 2015; 2019; 2023; 2027

Paraguay competed at the 2023 Pan American Games in Santiago, Chile from October 20 to November 5, 2023. This was Paraguay's 17th appearance at the Pan American Games, having competed at every edition of the games except 1959 and 1963.

On 4 October 2023, the Paraguayan Olympic Committee officially named the team of 117 athletes (41 men and 76 women) competing in 22 sports.

Athlete Derlis Ayala and cyclist Agua Marina Espínola were the country's flagbearers during the opening ceremony. Meanwhile, golfers Fabrizio Zanotti and Sofia Garcia were the country's flagbearers during the closing ceremony.

== Competitors ==
The following list shows the number of competitors (per gender) participating at the games per sport/discipline.

| Sport | Men | Women | Total |
|---|---|---|---|
| Athletics | 6 | 2 | 8 |
| Badminton | 1 | 0 | 1 |
| Boxing | 1 | 1 | 2 |
| Canoeing | 1 | 2 | 3 |
| Cycling | 1 | 3 | 4 |
| Equestrian | 2 | 0 | 2 |
| Fencing | 0 | 1 | 1 |
| Football | 0 | 18 | 18 |
| Golf | 2 | 2 | 4 |
| Handball | 0 | 14 | 14 |
| Karate | 1 | 1 | 2 |
| Roller sports | 3 | 0 | 3 |
| Rowing | 6 | 8 | 14 |
| Rugby sevens | 0 | 12 | 12 |
| Shooting | 1 | 1 | 2 |
| Swimming | 4 | 4 | 8 |
| Table tennis | 3 | 1 | 4 |
| Tennis | 3 | 1 | 4 |
| Volleyball | 2 | 2 | 4 |
| Water skiing | 1 | 1 | 2 |
| Weightlifting | 2 | 2 | 4 |
| Wrestling | 1 | 0 | 1 |
| Total | 41 | 76 | 117 |

== Medalists ==
The following Paraguayan competitors won medals at the games. In the by discipline sections below, medalists' names are bolded.

| Medal | Name | Sport | Event | Date |
|---|---|---|---|---|
| Gold | Sofia García | Golf | Women's individual | November 5 |
| Bronze | Nicole Martínez; Alejandra Alonso | Rowing | Women's coxless pair | October 23 |
| Bronze | Nicole Martínez | Rowing | Women's single sculls | October 25 |
| Bronze | Leonardo Curcel | Canoeing | Men's slalom C-1 | October 29 |
| Bronze | Ana Paula Fernandes | Canoeing | Women's slalom C-1 | October 29 |
| Bronze | Agua Marina Espínola | Cycling | Women's road race | October 29 |
| Bronze | Paraguay women's national handball team: Fátima Acuña; Ada Miskinich; Fernanda Insfrán; Kamila Rolón; Jazmín Mendoza; Karina dos Santos; Kiara Vergara; Camila Feschenko; Delyne Leiva; Fátima Ocampos; María Fernández; Belinda Bobadilla; Maggie Lugo; María Machuca | Handball | Women's tournament | October 29 |

== Athletics ==
Paraguay qualified eight athletes (six men and two women) for the games.

Men
Track & road events

| Athlete | Event | Semifinal | | Final | |
| Athlete | Event | Time | Rank | Time | Rank |
|---|---|---|---|---|---|
| Derlys Sánchez | Marathon | —N/a | | | |
| Jonathan Reimer; Cesar Escobar; Fredy Maidana; Misael Ayala | 4 × 100 m relay | —N/a | | | |

Field events

| Athlete | Event | Result | Rank |
|---|---|---|---|
| Antonio Cañete | Javelin throw | | |

Women
Track & road events

| Athlete | Event | Semifinal | | Final | |
| Athlete | Event | Time | Rank | Time | Rank |
|---|---|---|---|---|---|
| Fátima Giménez | Marathon | —N/a | | | |

Combined events – Heptathlon

| Athlete | Event | 100H | HJ | SP | 200 m | LJ | JT | 800 m | Total | Rank |
|---|---|---|---|---|---|---|---|---|---|---|
| Ana Camila Pirelli | Result | | | | | | | | | |
| Ana Camila Pirelli | Points | | | | | | | | | |

== Badminton ==
Paraguay qualified one male athlete.

Men

| Athlete | Event | First round | Second round | Quarterfinals | Semifinals | Final | Rank |
| Athlete | Event | Opposition Result | Opposition Result | Opposition Result | Opposition Result | Opposition Result | Rank |
|---|---|---|---|---|---|---|---|
| Leo Lee | Singles | Sebastian Vasquez (CHI) | | | | | |

== Boxing ==
Paraguay qualified two boxers (one per gender).

| Athlete | Event | Quarterfinal | Semifinal | Final | |
| Athlete | Event | Opposition Result | Opposition Result | Opposition Result | Rank |
|---|---|---|---|---|---|
| Marcelo Sparling | Men's +92 kg | | | | |
| Minerva Mereles | Women's –57 kg | | | | |

== Canoeing ==
=== Slalom ===
Paraguay qualified a total of two slalom athletes (one man and one woman).

| Athlete | Event | Preliminary round | | | Heat | | Semifinal | | Final | |
| Athlete | Event | Run 1 | Run 2 | Rank | Time | Rank | Time | Rank | Time | Rank |
|---|---|---|---|---|---|---|---|---|---|---|
| Leonardo Curcel | Men's C-1 | | | | —N/a | | | | | |
| Ana Paula Castro | Women's C-1 | | | | —N/a | | | | | |

=== Sprint ===
Paraguay qualified a female sprint canoeist.

| Athlete | Event | Heat | | Semifinal | | Final | |
| Athlete | Event | Time | Rank | Time | Rank | Time | Rank |
|---|---|---|---|---|---|---|---|
| Yasmin García | Women's K-1 500 m | | | | | | |

== Cycling ==
Paraguay qualified two female cyclists.

=== BMX ===
Freestyle

| Athlete | Event | Seeding | | Final | |
| Athlete | Event | Points | Rank | Points | Rank |
|---|---|---|---|---|---|
| Patrícia Bordón | Women | | | | |

Racing

| Athlete | Event | Ranking round | | Quarterfinal | | Semifinal | | Final | |
| Athlete | Event | Time | Rank | Points | Rank | Time | Rank | Time | Rank |
|---|---|---|---|---|---|---|---|---|---|
| Andrea Díaz | Women | | | | | | | | |

=== Road ===
Paraguay qualified 1 cyclist at the Pan American Championships.

| Athlete | Event | Time | Rank |
|---|---|---|---|
| Água Marina Salinas | Women's road race | | |
| Água Marina Salinas | Women's time trial | | |

=== Track ===
Paraguay qualified a team of 12 cyclists (8 men and 4 women).

Sprint

| Athlete | Event | Qualification | | Round of 16 | Repechage 1 | Quarterfinals | Semifinals | Final | |
| Athlete | Event | Time | Rank | Opposition Time | Opposition Time | Opposition Result | Opposition Result | Opposition Result | Rank |
|---|---|---|---|---|---|---|---|---|---|
| Alexis López | Men's individual | | | | | | | | |

Keirin

| Athlete | Event | Heats | Repechage | Final |
| Athlete | Event | Rank | Rank | Rank |
|---|---|---|---|---|
| Alexis López | Men's | | | |

== Equestrian ==
Paraguay qualified two equestrians in Jumping.

=== Jumping ===
| Athlete | Horse | Event | Qualification | | | | | | | | Final | | | | | |
| Athlete | Horse | Event | Round 1 | | Round 2 | | Round 3 | | Total | | Round A | | Round B | | Total | |
| Athlete | Horse | Event | Faults | Rank | Faults | Rank | Faults | Rank | Faults | Rank | Faults | Rank | Faults | Rank | Faults | Rank |
|---|---|---|---|---|---|---|---|---|---|---|---|---|---|---|---|---|
| Denis Gouvea | | Individual | | | | | | | | | | | | | | |
| Martín Vera Caballero | | Individual | | | | | | | | | | | | | | |

== Fencing ==
Paraguay qualified one female fencer through the 2022 Pan American Fencing Championships in Asunción, Paraguay.

Individual

| Athlete | Event | Pool Round | | Round of 16 | Quarterfinals | Semifinals | Final | |
| Athlete | Event | Victories | Seed | Opposition Score | Opposition Score | Opposition Score | Opposition Score | Rank |
|---|---|---|---|---|---|---|---|---|
| Montserrat Viveros | Women's épée | | | | | | | |

== Football ==
Summary

Key:

- A.E.T – After extra time.
- P – Match decided by penalty-shootout.

| Team | Event | Group Stage | | | | Semifinal | Final / BM | |
| Team | Event | Opposition Score | Opposition Score | Opposition Score | Rank | Opposition Score | Opposition Score | Rank |
|---|---|---|---|---|---|---|---|---|
| Paraguay women's | Women's tournament | | | | | | | |

Paraguay qualified a women's team of 18 athletes after finishing fourth at the 2022 Copa América Femenina in Colombia.

Roster

- Cristina Cabañas
- Limpia Cáceres
- Lorena Ortíz
- Daisy Martínez
- Hilda Izquierdo
- María Segóvia
- Celsa Barrientos
- Deisy González
- Rebeca Valiente
- Jessica Villagra
- Fany Caballero
- Glória López
- Dahiana Giménez
- Camila Doerzbacher
- Fanny Duarte
- Ramona Martínez
- María Auxiliadora Vecca
- Camila Gómez

== Golf ==
Paraguay qualified a team of four golfers (two men and two women).

| Athlete | Event | Round 1 | Round 2 | Round 3 | Round 4 | Total | | |
| Athlete | Event | Score | Score | Score | Score | Score | Par | Rank |
|---|---|---|---|---|---|---|---|---|
| Fabrizio Zanotti | Men's individual | | | | | | | |
| Erich Fortlage | Men's individual | | | | | | | |
| Sofia García | Women's individual | | | | | | | |
| Milagros Chaves | Women's individual | | | | | | | |

== Handball ==
Summary

| Team | Event | Group stage | | | | Semifinal | Final / BM / Pl. | |
| Team | Event | Opposition Result | Opposition Result | Opposition Result | Rank | Opposition Result | Opposition Result | Rank |
|---|---|---|---|---|---|---|---|---|
| Paraguay women | Women's tournament | Brazil | Cuba | Uruguay | | | | |

=== Women's tournament ===
Paraguay qualified a women's team (of 14 athletes) by finishing second in the 2022 South American Games.

Roster

- Fátima Morel
- María Cristina Espinoza
- Delyne Morlas
- Ana Giuliana Vera
- María Paula Estigarribia
- Camila Krussel
- Fernanda Mora
- Kamila Ledesma
- Maggie Lara
- Karina Rodríguez
- Ada Lugo
- Jazmín Peralta
- Kiara Martínez
- Fátima Insfrán

Group B

| Pos | Team | Pld | W | D | L | GF | GA | GD | Pts | Qualification |
|---|---|---|---|---|---|---|---|---|---|---|
| 1 | Brazil | 3 | 3 | 0 | 0 | 104 | 35 | +69 | **6** | Semifinals |
| 2 | Paraguay | 3 | 1 | 0 | 2 | 68 | 76 | −8 | **2 (Note: Paraguay 2 Pts, +4 GD; Cuba 2 Pts, –1 GD; Uruguay 2 Pts, –3 GD)** | Semifinals |
| 3 | Cuba | 3 | 1 | 0 | 2 | 62 | 101 | −39 | **2** | 5–8th place semifinals |
| 4 | Uruguay | 3 | 1 | 0 | 2 | 53 | 75 | −22 | **2** | 5–8th place semifinals |

Source: Santiago 2023
Rules for classification: 1) points; 2) head-to-head points; 3) head-to-head goal difference; 4) head-to-head goals scored; 5) goal difference; 6) goals scored; 7) draw.
Notes:

| 24 October 2023; 12:30 | **Brazil** | **27–15** | **Paraguay** | Gimnasio Polideportivo de Viña del Mar; Referees: Reyes, Zuñiga (CUB) |
| 24 October 2023; 12:30 | four players 4 | (15–7) | Insfran 6 | Gimnasio Polideportivo de Viña del Mar; Referees: Reyes, Zuñiga (CUB) |
| 24 October 2023; 12:30 | 1× (yellow card) 4× (suspension) | Report | 2× (suspension) | Gimnasio Polideportivo de Viña del Mar; Referees: Reyes, Zuñiga (CUB) |

| 25 October 2023; 12:30 | **Paraguay** | **31–26** | **Cuba** | Gimnasio Polideportivo de Viña del Mar; Referees: García, Paolantoni (ARG) |
| 25 October 2023; 12:30 | Fernández, Leiva 6 | (17–13) | Amorós 9 | Gimnasio Polideportivo de Viña del Mar; Referees: García, Paolantoni (ARG) |
| 25 October 2023; 12:30 | 1× (yellow card) 1× (suspension) | Report | 2× (suspension) | Gimnasio Polideportivo de Viña del Mar; Referees: García, Paolantoni (ARG) |

| 26 October 2023; 10:00 | **Paraguay** | **22–23** | **Uruguay** | Gimnasio Polideportivo de Viña del Mar; Referees: Hansen, Madsen (DEN) |
| 26 October 2023; 10:00 | Fernández 8 | (9–11) | Bianco 5 | Gimnasio Polideportivo de Viña del Mar; Referees: Hansen, Madsen (DEN) |
| 26 October 2023; 10:00 | 5× (suspension) 1× (red card) | Report | 3× (suspension) | Gimnasio Polideportivo de Viña del Mar; Referees: Hansen, Madsen (DEN) |

== Karate ==
Paraguay qualified a team of two karatekas (one man and one woman) at the 2022 South American Games.

Kumite

| Athlete | Event | Round robin | | | | Semifinal | Final | |
| Athlete | Event | Opposition Result | Opposition Result | Opposition Result | Rank | Opposition Result | Opposition Result | Rank |
|---|---|---|---|---|---|---|---|---|
| Jesús Servín | Men's −84 kg | | | | | | | |
| Yennifer Servin | Women's -55 kg | | | | | | | |

== Roller sports ==
=== Figure ===
Paraguay qualified a team of two athletes in figure skating (one man and one woman).

| Athlete | Event | Short program | | Long program | | Total | |
| Athlete | Event | Score | Rank | Score | Rank | Score | Rank |
|---|---|---|---|---|---|---|---|
| Victor López | Men's | | | | | | |

=== Speed ===
Paraguay qualified two male athletes in speed skating.

| Athlete | Event | Preliminary | | Semifinal | | Final | |
| Athlete | Event | Time | Rank | Time | Rank | Time | Rank |
|---|---|---|---|---|---|---|---|
| José Daniel Moncada | Men's 200 metres time-trial | —N/a | | | | | |
| José Daniel Moncada | Men's 500 metres + distance | —N/a | | | | | |
| Julio Mirena | Men's 1,000 metres sprint | —N/a | | | | | |
| Julio Mirena | Men's 10,000 m elimination | —N/a | | | | | |

== Rowing ==
Paraguay qualified 14 athletes (six men and eight women).

| Athlete | Event | Heat | | Repechage | | Semifinal | | Final A/B | |
| Athlete | Event | Time | Rank | Time | Rank | Time | Rank | Time | Rank |
|---|---|---|---|---|---|---|---|---|---|
| Javier Andrés Torres | Men's single sculls | | | | | | | | |
| | Men's double sculls | | | | | | | | |
| Nicole Anahi González | Women's single sculls | | | | | | | | |
| | Women's double sculls | | | | | —N/a | | | |
| | Women's pair | | | —N/a | | | | | |
| | Women's lightweight Double sculls | | | | | —N/a | | | |

== Rugby sevens ==
=== Women's tournament ===
Paraguay qualified a women's team (of 12 athletes) by finishing second in the 2022 South American Games.

Roster

- Ingrid Aquino
- Cinthia Santander
- María Villalba
- Romina Ocampos
- Sofia Flores
- Liz Salinas
- Araceli Franco
- Lucero Martinez
- Maira Cristaldo
- Chiara Gaete
- Kiara Gomez
- Gladys López

Summary

| Team | Event | Group stage | | | | Semifinal | Final / BM / Pl. | |
| Team | Event | Opposition Result | Opposition Result | Opposition Result | Rank | Opposition Result | Opposition Result | Rank |
|---|---|---|---|---|---|---|---|---|
| Paraguay women | Women's tournament | | | | | | | |

== Shooting ==
Paraguay qualified a total of two shooters.

Men

Pistol and rifle

| Athlete | Event | Qualification | | Final | |
| Athlete | Event | Points | Rank | Points | Rank |
|---|---|---|---|---|---|
| Claudio Frascone | 10 m air pistol | | | | |

Women

Shotgun

| Athlete | Event | Qualification | | Semifinal | | Final / BM | |
| Athlete | Event | Points | Rank | Points | Rank | Opposition Result | Rank |
|---|---|---|---|---|---|---|---|
| Helena Farres | Trap | | | | | | |

== Swimming ==
Paraguay qualified eight athletes (four per gender).

Men

- Benjamin Hockin
- Matheo Mateos
- Charles Daniel Hockin
- Matias Chaparro

Women

- Luana Méndez
- Maria Villagra
- Astrid Genes
- Ayelet Coronel

== Table tennis ==
Paraguay qualified a team of four athletes (three men and one woman) through the 2023 South American Championship and the Special Qualification Event.

Men

| Athlete | Event | Group stage | | | | First round | Second round | Quarterfinal | Semifinal | Final / BM | |
| Athlete | Event | Opposition Result | Opposition Result | Opposition Result | Rank | Opposition Result | Opposition Result | Opposition Result | Opposition Result | Opposition Result | Rank |
|---|---|---|---|---|---|---|---|---|---|---|---|
| Marcelo Aguirre | Singles | —N/a | | | | | | | | | |
| Alejandro Toranzos | Singles | —N/a | | | | | | | | | |
| Marcelo Aguirre; Alejandro Toranzos | Doubles | —N/a | | | | | | | | | |
| Marcelo Aguirre; Alejandro Toranzos; Axel Bertolo | Team | —N/a | | | | —N/a | | | | | |

Women

| Athlete | Event | Group stage | | | | First round | Second round | Quarterfinal | Semifinal | Final / BM | |
| Athlete | Event | Opposition Result | Opposition Result | Opposition Result | Rank | Opposition Result | Opposition Result | Opposition Result | Opposition Result | Opposition Result | Rank |
|---|---|---|---|---|---|---|---|---|---|---|---|
| Lucero Ovelar | Singles | —N/a | | | | | | | | | |

Mixed

| Athlete | Event | First Round | Quarterfinal | Semifinal | Final / BM | |
| Athlete | Event | Opposition Result | Opposition Result | Opposition Result | Opposition Result | Rank |
|---|---|---|---|---|---|---|
| Marcelo Aguirre; Lucero Ovelar | Doubles | | | | | |

== Tennis ==
Paraguay qualified a total of four tennis players (three men and one woman).

Men

| Athlete | Event | Round of 64 | Round of 32 | Round of 16 | Quarterfinal | Semifinal | Final / BM | |
| Athlete | Event | Opposition Result | Opposition Result | Opposition Result | Opposition Result | Opposition Result | Opposition Result | Rank |
|---|---|---|---|---|---|---|---|---|
| Adolfo Vallejo | Singles | Bye | | | | | | |
| Martín Vergara | Singles | Bye | | | | | | |
| Hernando Escurra | Singles | Bye | | | | | | |
| | Doubles | —N/a | Bye | | | | | |

Women

| Athlete | Event | Round of 64 | Round of 32 | Round of 16 | Quarterfinal | Semifinal | Final / BM | |
| Athlete | Event | Opposition Result | Opposition Result | Opposition Result | Opposition Result | Opposition Result | Opposition Result | Rank |
|---|---|---|---|---|---|---|---|---|
| Leyla Britez | Singles | Bye | | | | | | |

== Volleyball ==
Beach

Paraguay qualified a men's and women's pair for a total of four athletes.

| Athlete | Event | Group stage | | | | Round of 16 | Quarterfinal | Semifinal | Final / BM | |
| Athlete | Event | Opposition Result | Opposition Result | Opposition Result | Rank | Opposition Result | Opposition Result | Opposition Result | Opposition Result | Rank |
|---|---|---|---|---|---|---|---|---|---|---|
| Gonzalo Melgarejo; Giuliano Mazzare | Men's | | | | | Bye | | | | |
| Michelle Valiente; Erika Mongelós | Women's | | | | | Bye | | | | |

== Water skiing ==
Argentina qualified two wakeboarders (one of each gender) during the 2022 Pan American Championship.

Argentina also qualified four water skiers during the 2022 Pan American Water skiing Championship.

Wakeboard
Men

| Athlete | Event | Preliminary | | Final | | | | | | |
| Athlete | Event | Score | Rank | Score | Rank | Slalom | Jump | Tricks | Total | Rank |
|---|---|---|---|---|---|---|---|---|---|---|
| Camilo García | Wakeboard | | | —N/a | | | | | | |
| Ana Cristina Benza | Wakeboard | | | —N/a | | | | | | |

== Weightlifting ==
Paraguay qualified four weightlifters (two men and two women).

| Athlete | Event | Snatch | | Clean & Jerk | | Total | Rank |
| Athlete | Event | Result | Rank | Result | Rank | Total | Rank |
|---|---|---|---|---|---|---|---|
| Kyle Hamilton | Men's 73 kg | | | | | | |
| Juan José Recalde | Men's 102 kg | | | | | | |
| Violeta Martino | Women's 59 kg | | | | | | |
| Johana Prieto | Women's 71 kg | | | | | | |

== Wrestling ==
Paraguay qualified a male wrestler through the 2022 Pan American Wrestling Championships and the 2023 Pan American Wrestling Championships.

Key:

- VT – Victory by fall.
- PP – Decision by points – the loser with technical points.
- PO – Decision by points – the loser without technical points.
- SP – Technical superiority – the loser with technical points and a margin of victory of at least 9 (Greco-Roman) or 10 (freestyle) points.
- ST – Great superiority – the loser without technical points and a margin of victory of at least 8 (Greco-Roman) or 10 (freestyle) points.
- VA – Decision by withdrawal

Men

| Athlete | Event | Quarterfinal | Semifinal | Final / BM | |
| Athlete | Event | Opposition Result | Opposition Result | Opposition Result | Rank |
|---|---|---|---|---|---|
| Lisandro Cabrera | Greco-Roman 67 kg | | | | |

== See also ==
- Paraguay at the 2024 Summer Olympics
- Paraguay at the 2023 Parapan American Games
