= Swimming at the 2019 Pan American Games – Men's 200 metre freestyle =

Men's 200 metre freestyle at the 2019 Pan American Games
- Venue: Villa Deportiva Nacional, VIDENA
- Dates: August 7 (preliminaries and finals)
- Competitors: 22 from 20 nations

Medalists
Gold medal	Fernando Scheffer	Brazil
Silver medal	Breno Correia	Brazil
Bronze medal	Drew Kibler	United States

The men's 200 metre freestyle competition of the swimming events at the 2019 Pan American Games are scheduled to be held August 7, 2019 at the Villa Deportiva Nacional Videna cluster.

== Records ==
Prior to this competition, the existing world and Pan American Games records were as follows:

World record	Paul Biedermann (GER)	1:42.00	Rome, Italy	July 28, 2009
Pan American Games record	João de Lucca (BRA)	1:46.42	Toronto, Canada	July 15, 2015

== Results ==
KEY:	q	Fastest non-qualifiers	Q	Qualified	GR	Games record	NR	National record	PB	Personal best	SB	Seasonal best

=== Heats ===
The first round will be held on August 7.

Rank	Heat	Lane	Name	Nationality	Time	Notes
1	3	5	Jorge Iga	Mexico	1:47.16	QA
2	2	5	Drew Kibler	United States	1:48.02	QA
3	2	4	Breno Correia	Brazil	1:48.21	QA
4	1	5	Dylan Carter	Trinidad and Tobago	1:49.08	QA
5	1	4	Grant House	United States	1:49.40	QA
6	2	3	Mikel Schreuders	Aruba	1:49.48	QA
7	3	4	Fernando Scheffer	Brazil	1:49.86	QA
8	1	3	Rafael Zambrano	Venezuela	1:50.39	QA
9	3	3	Federico Grabich	Argentina	1:50.83	WD
10	3	6	Santiago Corredor	Colombia	1:51.16	WD
11	1	6	Alex Sobers	Barbados	1:51.76	QB
12	2	2	Jarod Arroyo	Puerto Rico	1:52.16	QB
13	3	2	Michael Gunning	Jamaica	1:52.55	QB
14	3	7	Joaquín Vargas	Peru	1:52.85	QB
15	2	6	Marcelo Acosta	El Salvador	1:52.91	QB
16	2	7	Matheo Mateos	Paraguay	1:53.12	QB
17	1	2	Gabriel Araya	Chile	1:53.35	QB
18	3	1	Joseph Rubio	Ecuador	1:54.55	QB
19	1	7	Jesse Washington	Bermuda	1:56.52	
20	2	1	Miguel Mena	Nicaragua	1:57.67	
21	3	8	Daniel Scott	Guyana	2:03.77	
22	1	1	Cruz Halbich	Saint Vincent and the Grenadines	2:10.04	

=== Final B ===
The B final was also held on August 7.

Rank	Lane	Name	Nationality	Time	Notes
9	4	Alex Sobers	Barbados	1:50.87	
10	3	Michael Gunning	Jamaica	1:52.10	
11	6	Joaquín Vargas	Peru	1:52.32	
12	1	Gabriel Araya	Chile	1:52.85	
13	2	Marcelo Acosta	El Salvador	1:52.87	
14	5	Jarod Arroyo	Puerto Rico	1:52.97	
15	7	Matheo Mateos	Paraguay	1:53.03	
16	8	Joseph Rubio	Ecuador	1:54.11	

=== Finl A ===
The A final was also held on August 7.

Rank	Lane	Name	Nationality	Time	Notes
1st place, gold medalist(s)	1	Fernando Scheffer	Brazil	1:46.68	
2nd place, silver medalist(s)	3	Breno Correia	Brazil	1:47.47	
3rd place, bronze medalist(s)	5	Drew Kibler	United States	1:47.71	
4	6	Dylan Carter	Trinidad and Tobago	1:47.78	
5	4	Jorge Iga	Mexico	1:48.18	
6	2	Grant House	United States	1:48.58	
7	7	Mikel Schreuders	Aruba	1:49.92	
8	8	Rafael Zambrano	Venezuela	1:50.12	
