= Paraguay at the 2015 Pan American Games =

- IOC code: PAR
- NOC: Comité Olímpico Paraguayo
- Website: www.cop.org.py

in Toronto, Canada 10–26 July 2015
- Competitors: 49 in 14 sports
- Flag bearer (opening): Benjamin Hockin
- Flag bearer (closing): Anna Camila Pirelli
- Medals Ranked =20th: Gold 0 Silver 1 Bronze 2 Total 3

Pan American Games appearances (overview)
- 1951; 1955; 1959–1963; 1967; 1971; 1975; 1979; 1983; 1987; 1991; 1995; 1999; 2003; 2007; 2011; 2015; 2019; 2023; 2027

Paraguay competed in the 2015 Pan American Games in Toronto, Canada from July 10 to 26, 2015.

Swimmer Benjamin Hockin was the flagbearer of the country at the opening ceremony.

== Competitors ==
The following table lists Paraguay's delegation per sport and gender.

Sport	Men	Women	Total
Athletics	1	2	3
Canoeing	0	1	1
Football	18	0	18
Golf	1	2	3
Roller sports	1	0	1
Rowing	3	2	5
Shooting	1	0	1
Squash	1	0	1
Swimming	5	1	6
Table tennis	3	0	3
Taekwondo	1	0	1
Tennis	1	3	4
Triathlon	0	1	1
Wrestling	0	1	1
Total	36	13	49

== Medalists ==
The following competitors from Paraguay won medals at the games. In the by discipline sections below, medalists' names are bolded.

Medal	Name	Sport	Event	Date
Silver	Marcelo Aguirre; Axel Gavilán; Alejandro Toranzos	Table tennis	Men's team	July 21
Bronze	Diego Galeano; Verónica Cepede Royg	Tennis	Mixed doubles	July 16
Bronze	Julieta Granada	Golf	Women's individual	July 19

**Medals by sport**
**Sport**	1st place, gold medalist(s)	2nd place, silver medalist(s)	3rd place, bronze medalist(s)	**Total**
Table tennis	0	1	0	1
Golf	0	0	1	1
Tennis	0	0	1	1
**Total**	**0**	**1**	**2**	**3**

**Medals by day**
**Day**	1st place, gold medalist(s)	2nd place, silver medalist(s)	3rd place, bronze medalist(s)	**Total**
July 16	0	0	1	1
July 19	0	0	1	1
July 21	0	1	0	1
**Total**	**0**	**1**	**2**	**3**

== Athletics ==
Paraguay qualified three athletes (one man and two women).

Men
Field events

Athlete	Event	Final	
Athlete	Event	Distance	Rank
Víctor Fatecha	Javelin throw	73.81	10

Women
Road events

Athlete	Event	Final	
Athlete	Event	Result	Rank
Carmen Martinez	Marathon	DNF	

Combined events – Heptathlon

Athlete	Event	100H	HJ	SP	200 m	LJ	JT	800 m	Final	Rank
Anna Camila Pirelli	Result	13.72	1.56	13.32	25.48	5.54	47.38	2:18.59	5663 **SB**	9
Anna Camila Pirelli	Points	1082	689	749	843	712	809	843	5663 **SB**	9

Key

- **SB** = Seasonal best
- DNF = Did not finish

== Canoeing ==
=== Slalom ===
Paraguay qualified the following boats:

Athlete(s)	Event	Preliminary						Semifinal		Final	
Athlete(s)	Event	Run 1	Rank	Run 2	Rank	Best	Rank	Time	Rank	Time	Rank
Ana Fernández	Women's C-1	153.92	4	194.49	4	206.49	4	189.03	5	Did not advance	
Ana Fernández	Women's K-1	188.20	7	DNS		394.20	7	270.98	7	DNF	

== Football ==
=== Men's tournament ===
Paraguay qualified a men's team of 18 athletes.

Roster

Head coach: Carlos Jara Saguier

No.	Pos.	Player	Date of birth (age)	Club
1	GK	Ignacio Don	February 28, 1982 (aged 33)	(Paraguayan Football Association) Nacional
2	DF	Miller Mareco	January 31, 1994 (aged 21)	(Paraguayan Football Association) San Lorenzo
3	DF	Luis Giménez	August 1, 1998 (aged 16)	(Paraguayan Football Association) Olimpia
4	DF	Gustavo Villamayor	March 29, 1993 (aged 22)	Unattached
5	DF	Iván Cañete	April 22, 1995 (aged 20)	(Royal Spanish Football Federation) Atlético Madrid
6	MF	Iván Ramírez	December 8, 1994 (aged 20)	Unattached
7	MF	Alan Benítez	January 25, 1994 (aged 21)	Unattached
8	MF	Ángel Cardozo Lucena	October 19, 1994 (aged 20)	Unattached
9	FW	Walter González	May 21, 1995 (aged 20)	(Paraguayan Football Association) Olimpia
10	FW	Miguel Almirón	February 10, 1994 (aged 21)	(Paraguayan Football Association) Cerro Porteño
11	MF	Derlis Alegre	January 10, 1994 (aged 21)	(Paraguayan Football Association) Sportivo Luqueno
12	GK	Gabriel Perrotta	December 26, 1998 (aged 16)	(Paraguayan Football Association) Nacional
13	DF	Juan Escobar	July 3, 1995 (aged 20)	(Paraguayan Football Association) Sportivo Luqueno
14	MF	Cristhian Paredes	May 18, 1998 (aged 17)	(Paraguayan Football Association) Sol de America
15	MF	Arturo Aranda	April 20, 1998 (aged 17)	(Paraguayan Football Association) Libertad
16	FW	Sebastián Ferreira	February 13, 1998 (aged 17)	(Paraguayan Football Association) Olimpia
17	MF	Walter Clar	September 27, 1994 (aged 20)	(Paraguayan Football Association) Rubio Ñu
18	FW	Cristian Colmán	February 26, 1994 (aged 21)	(Paraguayan Football Association) Nacional

Group B

Pos	Team	Pld	W	D	L	GF	GA	GD	Pts	Qualification
1	Mexico	3	2	1	0	6	3	+3	**7**	Medal round
2	Uruguay	3	2	0	1	5	1	+4	**6**	Medal round
3	Paraguay	3	1	1	1	6	3	+3	**4**	
4	Trinidad and Tobago	3	0	0	3	3	13	−10	**0**	

Source: Toronto 2015
July 13, 2015
20:35

Paraguay	1–1	Mexico
Cardozo 71'	Report	Zúñiga 15'

Hamilton Pan Am Soccer Stadium, Hamilton
Referee: Mathieu Bourdeau (Canada)

July 17, 2015
20:35

Paraguay	5–1	Trinidad and Tobago
Ferreira 63', 71'; Ramírez 65'; Alegre 76'; Aranda 79'	Report	García 53'

Hamilton Pan Am Soccer Stadium, Hamilton
Referee: Javier Santos (Puerto Rico)

July 21, 2015
20:35

Uruguay	1–0	Paraguay
Gorriarán 52'	Report

Hamilton Pan Am Soccer Stadium, Hamilton
Referee: Oscar Reyna (Guatemala)

== Golf ==
Paraguay qualified a team of three golfers (one man and two women).

Athlete(s)	Event	Final					
Athlete(s)	Event	Round 1	Round 2	Round 3	Round 4	Total	Rank
Gustavo Silvero	Men's individual	80	83	79	74	316 (+28)	=31
Milagros Chaves	Women's individual	83	73	73	73	302 (+14)	10
**Julieta Granada**	Women's individual	68	71	72	72	283 (–5)	3rd place, bronze medalist(s)
Gustavo Silvero; Milagros Chaves; Julieta Granada	Mixed team	148	154	151	146	599 (+23)	=10

== Roller sports ==
Paraguay qualified one male athlete.

=== Figure ===
Men

Athlete	Event	Short program		Free program		Final	
Athlete	Event	Points	Rank	Points	Rank	Points	Rank
Víctor López	Free skating	120.20	5 **Q**	115.40	5	466.40	5

== Rowing ==
Paraguay qualified a total of five rowers and four boats (three male and two female).

Athlete	Event	Heats		Repechage		Final	
Athlete	Event	Time	Rank	Time	Rank	Time	Rank
Arturo Rivarola	Men's single sculls (M1x)	7.46.35	6 **R**	8.02.01	5 **FB**	8:09.37	7
Franco Chiola; Daniel Sosa	Men's double sculls (M2x)	7:06.97	6 **R**	7:19.25	4 **FB**	7:01.43	10
Alejandra Alonso	Women's single sculls (W1x)	8:02.95	4 **R**	8:42.41	2 **FA**	7:57.05	6
Gabriela Mosqueira	Women's lightweight single sculls (LW1x)	8:20.42	4 **R**	8:50.50	3 **FB**	9:57.20	7

Qualification Legend: FA=Final A (medal); FB=Final B (non-medal); R=Repechage

== Shooting ==
Paraguay qualified one shooter.

Men

Athlete	Event	Qualification		Semifinal		Final	
Athlete	Event	Points	Rank	Points	Rank	Points	Rank
Paulo Reichardt	Trap	95	24	Did not advance			
Paulo Reichardt	Double trap	108	13	Did not advance			

== Squash ==
Paraguay received a men's wildcard slot.

Athlete	Event	Round of 32	Round of 16	Quarterfinal	Semifinal	Final
Athlete	Event	Opposition Result	Opposition Result	Opposition Result	Opposition Result	Opposition Result
Nicolas Caballero	Men's singles	Khalil (GUY); **W** (11–2, 11–5, 11–4)	Salazar (MEX); **L** (6–11, 4–11, 7–11)	Did not advance		

== Swimming ==
Paraguay qualified six swimmers (five men and one woman).

Key

- Note – Ranks given for swimming events are for all heats
- **FA** = Qualified for the A Final
- **FB** = Qualified for the B Final
- **NR** = National record

Men

Athlete	Event	Heat		Final	
Athlete	Event	Time	Rank	Time	Rank
Maximiliano Abreu	200 m butterfly	2:05.61	15 **FB**	2:06.91	15
Benjamin Hockin	100 m freestyle	50.14	12 **FB**	49.88	10
Benjamin Hockin	200 m freestyle	1:49.59	8 **FA**	1:50.03	8
Benjamin Hockin	100 m butterfly	53.63	11 **FB**	53.45	9
Charles Hockin	50 m freestyle	23.57	15 **FB**	23.76	16
Charles Hockin	100 m backstroke	56.56	10 **FB**	57.25	11
Charles Hockin	200 m backstroke	2:10.94	21	Did not advance	
Matías López	200 m backstroke	2:01.05	6 **FA**	2:00.91 **NR**	7
Matías López	200 m individual medley	2:05.09 **NR**	12 **FB**	2:04.94 **NR**	13
Matías López	400 m individual medley	4:30.27 **NR**	14 **FB**	4:27.47 **NR**	14
Renato Prono	100 m breaststroke	1:03.75	13 **FB**	1:04.57	15
Renato Prono	200 m breaststroke	2:27.13	21	Did not advance	
Maximiliano Abreu; Benjamin Hockin; Charles Hockin; Matías López	4 × 100 metre freestyle relay	3:36.52	6 **FA**	3:27.60	6
Maximiliano Abreu; Benjamin Hockin; Charles Hockin; Matías López; Renato Prono	4 × 100 metre medley relay	3:47.72	8 **FA**	3:45.37	8

Women

Athlete	Event	Heat		Final	
Athlete	Event	Time	Rank	Time	Rank
Karen Riveros	50 m freestyle	27.17	20	Did not advance	
Karen Riveros	100 m freestyle	58.94	23	Did not advance	
Karen Riveros	200 m freestyle	2:10.32	19	Did not advance	

== Table tennis ==
Paraguay qualified a men's team of three athletes. The men's table tennis team won a silver medal, the first ever for the country in table tennis at the Pan American Games. The silver also equaled the best result by any athlete/team from the country at the games.

Men

Athlete	Event	Group stage				Round of 32	Round of 16	Quarterfinals	Semifinals	Final / BM	
Athlete	Event	Opposition Result	Opposition Result	Opposition Result	Rank	Opposition Result	Opposition Result	Opposition Result	Opposition Result	Opposition Result	Rank
Marcelo Aguirre	Singles	Blas (PER); **W** 4–2	Gonzalez (PUR); **W** 4–0	Villa (MEX); **W** 4–1	1 **Q**	Bye	Tabachnik (ARG); **L** 2–4	Did not advance			=9
Axel Gavilan	Singles	Tabachnik (ARG); **L** 1–4	Diaz (VEN); **L** 3–4	Afanador (PUR); **L** 1–4	4	Did not advance					
Alejandro Toranzos	Singles	Mino (ECU); **L** 0–4	Gatica (GUA); **W** 4–0	Campos (CUB); **L** 2–4	3	Did not advance					
**Marcelo Aguirre**; **Axel Gavilan**; **Alejandro Toranzos**	Team	Cuba; **W** 3–1	Chile; **L** 2–3	—N/a	1 **Q**	—N/a		Mexico; **W** 3–0	Puerto Rico; **W** 3–0	Brazil; **L** 0–3	2nd place, silver medalist(s)

== Taekwondo ==
Paraguay received a wildcard to enter one male athlete. Matias Fernandez was disqualified prior to the event, and did not compete.

Men

Athlete	Event	Round of 16	Quarterfinals	Semifinals	Repechage	Bronze medal	Final	
Athlete	Event	Opposition Result	Opposition Result	Opposition Result	Opposition Result	Opposition Result	Opposition Result	Rank
Matias Fernandez	58 kg	Carlos Navarro (MEX); **L** DSQ	Did not advance		Harold Avella (COL); **L** DSQ	Did not advance		

== Tennis ==
Paraguay qualified four tennis players (one male and three female).

Athlete	Event	First round	Round of 32	Round of 16	Quarterfinals	Semifinals	Final / BM	
Athlete	Event	Opposition Score	Opposition Score	Opposition Score	Opposition Score	Opposition Score	Opposition Score	Rank
Diego Galeano	Men's singles	Hernández (CUB); **W** 6–3, 6–1	Arévalo (ESA); **W** 7–5, 6–3	Lapentti (ECU); **W** 6–3, 6–2	Andreozzi (ARG); **L** 6–2, 1–6, 6–7 ^{6–8}	Did not advance		=5
Camila Giangreco Campiz	Women's singles	—N/a	Gámiz (VEN); **L** 3–6, 5–7	Did not advance				=17
Montserrat González	Women's singles	—N/a	Herazo (COL); **W** 6–3, 6–7, ^{5–7} 6–3	Zhao (CAN); **L** 4–6, 6–4, 3–6	Did not advance			=9
Verónica Cepede Royg	Women's singles	—N/a	Ormaechea (ARG); **W** 7–6, ^{9–7} 6–4	Gonçalves (BRA); **W** 6–4, 6–1	Davis (USA); **L** 2–6, 6–3, 3–6	Did not advance		=5
Camila Giangreco Campiz; Montserrat González	Women's doubles	—N/a	—N/a		Dabrowski / Zhao (CAN); **L** 2–6, 3–6	Did not advance		=5
**Diego Galeano**; **Verónica Cepede Royg**	Mixed doubles	—N/a	—N/a	Subervi / Segarelli (DOM); **W** 6–4, 5–7, [10–5]	Austin / Vickery (USA); **W** 6–0, 6–3	Andreozzi / Irigoyen (ARG); **L** 6–1, 3–6, [7–10]	Struvay / Duque (COL); **W** 6–3, 7–5	3rd place, bronze medalist(s)

== Triathlon ==
Paraguay received a wildcard to enter one female triathlete.

Women

Athlete	Event	Swim (1.5 km)	Trans 1	Bike (40 km)	Trans 2	Run (10 km)	Total	Rank
Nicole Wood	Individual	25:16	0:54	LAP				

== Wrestling ==
Paraguay received one wildcard in women's freestyle. However, later Stephanie Bragayrac was disqualified from the games for doping. Bragayrac did not compete in the event, and her opponent in the first round won by default.

Women's freestyle

Athlete	Event	Preliminaries	Quarterfinals	Semifinals	Final
Athlete	Event	Opposition Result	Opposition Result	Opposition Result	Opposition Result
Stephanie Bragayrac	63 kg	Dennisse Antes (ECU); **L** DQ	Did not advance		

== See also ==
- Paraguay at the 2016 Summer Olympics
