= Canoeing at the 2023 Pan American Games – Women's slalom C-1 =

Women's slalom C-1 at the 2023 Pan American Games
- Venue: Aconcagua River
- Dates: October 28 – October 29
- Winning time: 108.52

Medalists
Gold medal	Ana Sátila	Brazil
Silver medal	Lois Betteridge	Canada
Bronze medal	Ana Paula Fernandes	Paraguay

The women's slalom c-1 competition of the canoeing events at the 2023 Pan American Games was held from October 28 to 29 at the Aconcagua River in Los Andes, Chile.

== Schedule ==
Date	Time	Round
October 28, 2023	09:52	Heats
October 29, 2023	09:52	Semi-final
October 29, 2023	11:20	Final

== Results ==
Rank	Name	Preliminary Heats						Semifinal			Final	
Rank	Name	1st Ride	Pen.	2nd Ride	Pen.	Best	Rank	Time	Pen.	Rank	Time	Pen.
1st place, gold medalist(s)	Ana Sátila (BRA)	DSQ	0	87.78	0	87.78	1	324.05	156	6	108.52	4
2nd place, silver medalist(s)	Lois Betteridge (CAN)	91.94	0	101.04	6	91.94	2	122.18	4	1	119.69	6
3rd place, bronze medalist(s)	Ana Paula Fernandes (PAR)	121.29	8	108.94	4	108.94	5	204.70	58	5	160.97	10
4	Nerea Castiglione (ARG)	151.66	50	98.84	0	98.84	3	182.65	54	3	184.72	60
5	Marcella Altman (USA)	107.05	8	100.47	2	100.47	4	149.51	10	4	186.81	62
6	Emilia Retamales (CHI)	248.49	108	230.77	102	230.77	6	273.56	108	2	350.04	162
