= Emily Odwin =

Barbadian professional golfer (born 2004)

Personal information
- Nationality: Barbados
- Born: 15 March 2004 (age 22)

Career
- Sport: Golf
- College: University of Texas; Southern Methodist University
- Turned professional: 2026

Best results in LPGA major championships
- Chevron Championship: DNP
- Women's PGA C'ship: DNP
- U.S. Women's Open: CUT: 2025
- Women's British Open: DNP
- Evian Championship: DNP

Emily Odwin (born 15 March 2004) is a professional golfer from Barbados. In 2025, she made history by becoming the first golfer from Barbados, man or woman, to qualify for a major golf championship, when she earned a berth to the 2025 U.S. Women's Open.

In 2026, she became the first golfer from Barbados and the Caribbean to compete in and make the cut at the Augusta National Women's Amateur, finishing tied for 27th. She turned professional in June 2026, making her professional debut on the Epson Tour at the Great Lakes Championship.

== Early life and amateur career ==
Odwin grew up in Saint James Parish, Barbados. As a child, she grew up swimming and practicing karate. While watching Tiger Woods and Jordan Spieth with her father, she decided to try golf, even though the sport does not have a large presence on the island. At age 11, she committed herself to becoming a professional golfer. While she was learning the sport, there were only 25 junior players across the six courses on Barbados.

By 2017, Odwin was ranked the top junior golfer in Barbados. Odwin won titles at the 2019 and 2020 Royal Westmoreland Ladies' Open, and the 2019 Caribbean Amateur Junior and the 2019 HJGT Tournament of Champions. In 2021, she qualified for both the U.S. Women's Amateur and the U.S. Girls' Junior competitions, the first time a Barbadian had done so. Odwin finished 80th in the 2021 Girl's Junior and 65th in the Women's Amateur.

Odwin represented Barbados at the 2019 Pan American Games, finishing T26; the 2023 Pan American Games, finishing T18; and the 2023 Central American and Caribbean Games, finishing 6th.

=== Collegiate golf ===
In 2021, Odwin was recruited by the University of Texas to play on their women's golf team. At Texas, Odwin placed fifth at the PING/SU Invitational at the Papago Golf Club. After her freshman season, Odwin transferred to Southern Methodist University, and led the SMU Mustangs at the 2023 NCAA Championship, finishing in a tie for 17th place.

In June 2024, Odwin travelled to Ireland to play in The Women's Amateur Championship. She finished in 79th position. In November 2024, Odwin was a runner-up in the Women's Amateur Latin America tournament in Peru.

In January 2025, Odwin recorded a sixth place finish in the 2025 Australian Amateur, with a best round of even-par 73. Later that year, Odwin made history by becoming the first golfer from Barbados to qualify for a major golf championship. In April 2025, she won a qualifier held at the Olympic Club in San Francisco, earning a berth for the 2025 U.S. Women's Open.

In 2026, Odwin received an invitation to compete in the Augusta National Women's Amateur, becoming the first golfer from the Caribbean to earn an invitation to the event.

== Professional career ==
Odwin turned professional in June 2026.

== Amateur wins ==
- 2018 Sir Garry Sobers Championships
- 2019 Sir Garry Sobers Championships, Caribbean Amateur Junior Championship
- 2020 Barbados International Junior Golf Championship
- 2021 BGA OOM #3, BGA OOM #4
- 2022 Caribbean Junior Golf Championship

== Results in LPGA majors ==
Tournament	2025
Chevron Championship	
U.S. Women's Open	CUT
Women's PGA Championship	
The Evian Championship	
Women's British Open	

Did not play

CUT = missed the half-way cut
