= Paraguay at the 1987 Pan American Games =

- IOC code: PAR
- NOC: Comité Olímpico Paraguayo
- Website: www.olympic.org/paraguay

in Indianapolis 7–23 August 1987
- Medals: Gold 0 Silver 0 Bronze 0 Total 0

Pan American Games appearances (overview)
- 1951; 1955; 1959–1963; 1967; 1971; 1975; 1979; 1983; 1987; 1991; 1995; 1999; 2003; 2007; 2011; 2015; 2019; 2023; 2027

The 10th Pan American Games were held in Indianapolis, Indiana, United States, from 7 August to 23 August 1987.

== Results by event ==
=== Football ===
==== Group C ====
Rank	Team	Pts	Pld	W	D	L	GF	GA
1	Mexico	6	3	3	0	0	10	1
2	Guatemala	3	3	1	1	1	3	2
3	Paraguay	2	3	0	2	1	1	8
4	Colombia	1	3	0	1	2	1	4

Colombia	0 - 0	Paraguay
Mexico	7 - 0	Paraguay
Guatemala	1 - 1	Paraguay

== See also ==
- Paraguay at the 1988 Summer Olympics
