= Women's Amateur Latin America =

Tournament information
- Location: Latin America
- Established: 2021
- Organized by: The R&A; Annika Foundation
- Format: Stroke play, 72 holes
- Month played: November

Current champion
- (Colombia) María José Marín

The Women's Amateur Latin America Championship was founded in 2021 by The R&A and the Annika Foundation, to create an event corresponding to The Women's Amateur Championship, the U.S. Women's Amateur and the Women's Amateur Asia-Pacific for Latin America, analogous to the Latin America Amateur Championship for men.

The winner earns invitations to play in The Women's Amateur Championship in Britain and two major championships, the Women's British Open and The Evian Championship, and from 2023 also The Chevron Championship.

== Winners ==
Year	Player	Score	Margin of victory	Runner-up	Location	Ref
2025	(Colombia) María José Marín	281 (−7)	Playoff	(Barbados) Emily Odwin	Mexico	
2024	(Mexico) Clarisa Temelo	275 (−9)	6 strokes	(Barbados) Emily Odwin	Peru	
2023	(Argentina) Ela Anacona	273 (−15)	12 strokes	(Venezuela) Vanessa Gilly	Argentina	
2022	(Argentina) Valentina Rossi	279 (−9)	1 stroke	(Colombia) María José Marín	Argentina	
2021	(Colombia) Valery Plata	276 (−12)	1 stroke	(Colombia) María José Marín	Argentina	
