= Swimming at the 2015 Pan American Games – Men's 200 metre backstroke =

Men's 200 metre backstroke at the 2015 Pan American Games
- Venue: CIBC Pan Am/Parapan Am Aquatics Centre and Field House
- Dates: July 15 (preliminaries and finals)
- Competitors: 21 from 13 nations
- Winning time: 1:57.47

Medalists
Gold medal	Sean Lehane	United States
Silver medal	Carter Griffin	United States
Bronze medal	Leonardo de Deus	Brazil

The men's 200 metre backstroke competition of the swimming events at the 2015 Pan American Games took place on July 15 at the CIBC Pan Am/Parapan Am Aquatics Centre and Field House in Toronto, Canada. The defending Pan American Games champion was Thiago Pereira of Brazil.

This race consisted of four lengths of the pool, all lengths in backstroke. The top eight swimmers from the heats would qualify for the A final (where the medals would be awarded), while the next best eight swimmers would qualify for the B final.

== Records ==
Prior to this competition, the existing world and Pan American Games records were as follows:

World record	Aaron Peirsol (USA)	1:51.92	Rome, Italy	July 31, 2009
Pan American Games record	Thiago Pereira (BRA)	1:57.19	Guadalajara, Mexico	October 21, 2011

The following new records were set during this competition.

Date	Event	Name	Nationality	Time	Record
15 July	Heats	Sean Lehane	United States	1:57.11	GR

== Qualification ==
Each National Olympic Committee (NOC) was able to enter up to two entrants providing they had met the A standard (2:06.05) in the qualifying period (January 1, 2014 to May 1, 2015). NOCs were also permitted to enter one athlete providing they had met the B standard (2:13.61) in the same qualifying period. All other competing athletes were entered as universality spots.

== Schedule ==
All times are Eastern Time Zone (UTC-4).

Date	Time	Round
July 15, 2015	11:16	Heats
July 15, 2015	20:39	Final B
July 15, 2015	20:46	Final A

== Results ==
KEY:	q	Fastest non-qualifiers	Q	Qualified	GR	Games record	NR	National record	PB	Personal best	SB	Seasonal best

=== Heats ===
The first round was held on July 15.

Rank	Heat	Lane	Name	Nationality	Time	Notes
1	1	4	Sean Lehane	United States	1:57.11	QA, GR
2	2	4	Carter Griffin	United States	1:58.54	QA
3	2	5	Omar Pinzón	Colombia	1:58.74	QA
4	3	3	Carlos Omaña	Venezuela	1:59.81	QA, NR
5	3	4	Leonardo de Deus	Brazil	2:00.80	QA
6	2	3	Matías López	Paraguay	2:01.05	QA
7	3	5	Russell Wood	Canada	2:01.28	QA
8	3	6	Armando Barrera	Cuba	2:01.33	QA
9	3	2	David Cespedes	Colombia	2:02.18	QB
10	1	3	Brandonn Almeida	Brazil	2:02.32	QB
11	1	6	Agustín Hernández	Argentina	2:02.76	QB
12	2	2	Yeziel Morales	Puerto Rico	2:02.89	QB
13	2	6	Ezequiel Trujillo	Mexico	2:03.51	QB
14	2	7	Felipe Vargas	Argentina	2:03.82	QB
15	1	2	Andy Song An	Mexico	2:04.00	QB
16	1	7	Jesus Lopez	Venezuela	2:06.21	QB
17	2	1	Timothy Winter	Jamaica	2:07.17	
18	1	1	Matthew Mays	Virgin Islands	2:08.56	
19	1	5	Markus Thormeyer	Canada	2:08.93	
20	3	1	Christopher Courtis	Barbados	2:09.73	
21	3	7	Charles Hockin	Paraguay	2:10.94	

=== B Final ===
The B final was also held on July 15.

Rank	Lane	Name	Nationality	Time	Notes
9	4	David Cespedes	Colombia	2:01.95	
10	7	Andy Song An	Mexico	2:02.20	
11	3	Yeziel Morales	Puerto Rico	2:02.26	
12	6	Ezequiel Trujillo	Mexico	2:03.09	
13	5	Agustín Hernández	Argentina	2:03.37	
14	2	Felipe Vargas	Argentina	2:03.98	
15	1	Jesus Lopez	Venezuela	2:06.46	
16	8	Timothy Winter	Jamaica	2:07.78	

=== A Final ===
The A final was also held on July 15.

Rank	Lane	Name	Nationality	Time	Notes
1st place, gold medalist(s)	4	Sean Lehane	United States	1:57.47	
2nd place, silver medalist(s)	5	Carter Griffin	United States	1:58.18	
3rd place, bronze medalist(s)	2	Leonardo de Deus	Brazil	1:58.27	
4	3	Omar Pinzón	Colombia	1:58.77	
5	1	Russell Wood	Canada	1:59.91	
6	6	Carlos Omaña	Venezuela	2:00.02	
7	7	Matías López	Paraguay	2:00.91	NR
8	8	Armando Barrera	Cuba	2:01.24	
