= Roller sports at the 2019 Pan American Games – Men's free skating =

Men's free skating at the 2019 Pan American Games
- Venue: Polideportivo 3
- Dates: July 26–27
- Competitors: 8 from 8 nations
- Winning score: 152.63

Medalists
Gold medal	Juan Sánchez	Argentina
Silver medal	John Burchfield	United States
Bronze medal	Gustavo Casado	Brazil

The men's artistic skating free skating at the 2019 Pan American Games in Lima, Peru was held between July 26–27 at the Polideportivo 3.

== Results ==
8 athletes from 8 countries competed.

Rank	Name	Nation	SP	Rank	LP	Rank	Total points
1st place, gold medalist(s)	Juan Sánchez	Argentina	60.95	1	91.68	1	152.63
2nd place, silver medalist(s)	John Burchfield	United States	41.80	6	91.37	2	133.17
3rd place, bronze medalist(s)	Gustavo Casado	Brazil	44.90	4	83.19	3	128.09
4	Victor López	Paraguay	50.07	2	70.69	4	120.76
5	Jose Luis Diaz	Chile	47.15	3	65.51	6	112.66
6	Jairo Ortiz	Colombia	42.29	5	67.84	5	110.13
7	Felipe Reyna	Mexico	25.28	7	43.58	7	68.86
8	Roberto Quiroz	Peru	7.65	8	14.13	8	21.78

Short Program source:
Long Program source:
