= Canoeing at the 2023 Pan American Games – Men's slalom C-1 =

Men's slalom C-1 at the 2023 Pan American Games
- Venue: Aconcagua River
- Dates: October 28 – October 29
- Winning time: 95.87

Medalists
Gold medal	Zachary Lokken	United States
Silver medal	Kauã da Silva	Brazil
Bronze medal	Leonardo Curcel	Paraguay

The men's slalom c-1 competition of the canoeing events at the 2023 Pan American Games was held from October 28 to 29 at the Aconcagua River in Los Andes, Chile.

== Schedule ==
Date	Time	Round
October 28, 2023	09:30	Heats
October 29, 2023	09:30	Semi-final
October 29, 2023	11:00	Final

== Results ==
The seven best times advance to the semi-finals. From there, the best six times advance to the final, where the medals are determined.

Rank	Name	Preliminary Heats						Semifinal			Final	
Rank	Name	1st Ride	Pen.	2nd Ride	Pen.	Best	Rank	Time	Pen.	Rank	Time	Pen.
1st place, gold medalist(s)	Zachary Lokken (USA)	82.23	0	80.60	0	80.60	1	147.00	50	6	95.87	0
2nd place, silver medalist(s)	Kauã da Silva (BRA)	87.46	2	86.60	0	86.60	4	106.85	4	2	97.22	2
3rd place, bronze medalist(s)	Leonardo Curcel (PAR)	92.41	2	89.39	0	89.39	5	108.85	0	3	110.11	4
4	Sebastián Rossi (ARG)	89.26	4	82.34	0	82.34	2	96.10	0	1	110.65	5
5	Alex Baldoni (CAN)	86.67	2	84.66	2	84.66	3	115.92	4	4	118.49	8
6	Silva José (VEN)	103.87	2	105.98	6	103.87	7	122.46	6	5	141.38	16
7	Ricardo Fentanes (MEX)	DSQ	8	99.96	2	99.96	6	269.46	114	7	did not advance	
8	Geral Soto (CHI)	181.54	106	106.78	8	106.78	8	did not advance				
9	John Hunter Rodríguez (PER)	131.31	52	110.63	4	110.63	9	did not advance				
