= 2017 South American Youth Games =

II South American Youth Games
- Host city: Santiago
- Country: Chile
- Nations: 14
- Athletes: 1279
- Events: 210 in 20 sports
- Opening: 29 September
- Closing: 8 October
- Opened by: Michelle Bachelet
- Main venue: Estadio Nacional
- Website: santiago2017.com

The 2017 South American Youth Games, also known as the II South American Youth Games, were a multi-sport event celebrated in Santiago, Chile. All 14 National Olympic Committees (NOCs) of the ODESUR were expected to compete.

== Bids ==
The election of the host for the South American Youth Games of 2017 was announced during the General Assembly of ODESUR between the 23 and 27 of March 2015.

- Santiago: Chile postulated for the Youth Games with a sports program that contemplates 20 sports and that would take place between the 21 and the 30 of October 2017. As established in the Manual of Candidature of the South American Sports Organization – ODESUR, the COCh sent the dossier of candidacy that expired on January 16, accompanied by the letter of President Michelle Bachelet, the Minister of Sports, Natalia Riffo, the Mayor of the Metropolitan Region, Claudio Orrego and the head of the Chilean Olympic Committee, Neven Ilic. The same venues and the infrastructure of the 2014 South American Games will be used.
- (Paraguay) Asunción: The Paraguayan Olympic Committee proposed the organization of the II South American Youth Games.

We want this event to take place in Asunción, now we'll start the fight.

— Camilo Pérez – President of the Paraguayan Olympic Committee

- (Bolivia) La Paz: The Director of Sports of La Paz announced the nomination to organize the South American Youth Games.
- (Colombia) Popayán or Tunja: The Colombian Olympic Committee proposed the organization of the II South American Youth Games. For this, two cities were launched as candidates to host the event.

== Sports ==
- Aquatics
  - Diving (7)
  - Swimming (36)
- Athletics (37)
- Badminton (5)
- 3-on-3 basketball (3)
- Boxing (8)
- Canoeing (4)
- Cycling
  - BMX racing (2)
  - Mountain biking (4)
  - Cycling (4)
  - Track cycling (6)
- Fencing (7)
- Artistic gymnastics (14)
- Golf (3)
- Judo (8)
- Karate (6)
- Rowing (4)
- Table tennis (7)
- Taekwondo (8)
- Tennis (5)
- Triathlon (3)
- Beach volleyball (2)
- Weightlifting (12)
- Wrestling (15)
  - Freestyle (10)
  - Greco-Roman (5)

== Participating teams ==
All 15 nations of the Organización Deportiva Suramericana (ODESUR) are expected to compete in these Youth Games.

- Argentina (150)
- Aruba (11)
- Bolivia (50)
- Brazil (149)
- Chile (208)
- Colombia (137)
- Curaçao (129)
- Ecuador ()
- Guyana
- Panama
- Paraguay
- Peru
- Suriname
- Uruguay
- Venezuela

== Medal table ==
Key

* Host nation (Chile)

Rank	Nation	Gold	Silver	Bronze	Total
1	Brazil (BRA)	61	45	45	151
2	Colombia (COL)	45	35	39	119
3	Argentina (ARG)	38	29	35	102
4	Chile (CHI)*	21	29	38	88
5	Venezuela (VEN)	15	27	32	74
6	Ecuador (ECU)	13	19	28	60
7	Peru (PER)	7	10	23	40
8	Uruguay (URU)	3	5	6	14
9	Paraguay (PAR)	2	2	7	11
10	Bolivia (BOL)	1	4	3	8
11	Guyana (GUY)	1	3	0	4
12	Panama (PAN)	1	2	3	6
13	Aruba (ARU)	1	1	1	3
14	Suriname (SUR)	0	0	4	4
Totals (14 entries)		209	211	264	684
