= Golf at the 2023 Pan American Games =

- Golf pictogram
- Venue: Prince of Wales Country Club
- Start date: 2 November 2023
- End date: 5 November 2023
- No. of events: 2 (1 men, 1 women)
- Competitors: 62 from 21 nations

Golf competitions at the 2023 Pan American Games in Santiago, Chile were held between 2 and 5 November 2023 at the Prince of Wales Country Club, located in La Reina.

A total of two events were contested: an individual competition for both men and women. The mixed team event, which had been contested at the past two editions was not contested, similar to the 2020 Summer Olympics.

== Qualification ==
A total of up to 64 golfers (32 men and 32 women) could qualify to compete. Each nation was able to enter a maximum of 4 athletes (two per gender). The host nation, Chile, automatically qualified the maximum number of athletes (4). The rest of the spots were awarded across the Official World Golf Ranking and Women's World Golf Rankings as of July 3, 2023. Any remaining spots were allocated using the World Amateur Golf Ranking as of 3 July 2023.

== Participating nations ==
A total of 21 countries qualified golfers. The number of athletes a nation has entered is in parentheses beside the name of the country.

- Argentina (4)
- Bahamas (1)
- Barbados (1)
- Bolivia (4)
- Brazil (4)
- Canada (4)
- Cayman Islands (1)
- Chile (4)
- Colombia (4)
- Ecuador (2)
- Independent Athletes Team (3)
- Mexico (4)
- Panama (4)
- Paraguay (4)
- Peru (4)
- Puerto Rico (2)
- Trinidad and Tobago (1)
- United States (4)
- Uruguay (2)
- Venezuela (4)
- Virgin Islands (1)

== Competition schedule ==
The following was the competition schedule for the golf competitions:

R1	Round 1	R2	Round 2	R3	Round 3	R4	Round 4/Final

Event↓/Date →	Thu 2	Fri 3	Sat 4	Sun 5
Men's individual	R1	R2	R3	R4
Women's individual	R1	R2	R3	R4

== Medal summary ==
=== Medal table ===
* Host nation (Chile)

Rank	Nation	Gold	Silver	Bronze	Total
1	Mexico	1	0	0	1
1	Paraguay	1	0	0	1
3	Colombia	0	2	0	2
4	Canada	0	0	1	1
4	United States	0	0	1	1
Totals (5 entries)		2	2	2	6

=== Medalists ===
Event	Gold	Silver	Bronze
Men's individual	Abraham Ancer; Mexico	Sebastián Muñoz; Colombia	Dylan Menante; United States
Women's individual	Sofia García; Paraguay	Mariajo Uribe; Colombia	Alena Sharp; Canada

== See also ==
- Golf at the 2024 Summer Olympics
