= Paraguay at the 1995 Pan American Games =

- IOC code: PAR
- NOC: Comité Olímpico Paraguayo
- Website: www.cop.org.py

in Mar del Plata 11–26 March 1995
- Medals Ranked 21st: Gold 0 Silver 1 Bronze 2 Total 3

Pan American Games appearances (overview)
- 1951; 1955; 1959–1963; 1967; 1971; 1975; 1979; 1983; 1987; 1991; 1995; 1999; 2003; 2007; 2011; 2015; 2019; 2023; 2027

The 12th Pan American Games were held in Mar del Plata, Argentina from March 11 to 26, 1995.

== Medals ==
=== Silver ===
===== Athletics =====
- Men's Javelin Throw: Edgar Baumann

=== Bronze ===
===== Taekwondo =====
- Women's Lightweight (– 60 kg): Paola Viveros

===== Karate =====
- Men's Kumite (Team): Paraguay

== Results by event ==
=== Field hockey ===
==== Men's competition ====
Pos	Team	Pld	W	D	L	GF	GA	GD	Pts
1	Argentina	6	5	1	0	42	3	+39	11
2	Canada	6	4	2	0	31	3	+28	10
3	United States	6	4	0	2	26	10	+16	8
4	Cuba	6	3	1	2	22	7	+15	7
5	Trinidad and Tobago	6	2	0	4	11	29	−18	4
6	Chile	6	1	0	5	8	19	−11	2
7	Paraguay	6	0	0	6	1	73	−72	0

Source: LA84 Foundation

==== Women's competition ====
Pos	Team	Pld	W	D	L	GF	GA	GD	Pts
1	United States	6	5	1	0	29	1	+28	11
2	Argentina	6	5	1	0	26	1	+25	11
3	Canada	6	4	0	2	14	5	+9	8
4	Cuba	6	2	0	4	5	16	−11	4
5	Trinidad and Tobago	6	1	1	4	5	11	−6	3
6	Jamaica	6	1	1	4	2	14	−12	3
7	Paraguay	6	0	0	6	0	37	−37	0

Source: LA84 Foundation

=== Football ===
==== Group A ====
Pos	Team	Pld	W	D	L	GF	GA	GD	Pts
1	Argentina	3	2	1	0	6	2	+4	7
2	Paraguay	3	2	0	1	4	1	+3	6
3	Honduras	3	1	1	1	6	4	+2	4
4	United States	3	0	0	3	0	9	−9	0

Source: RSSSF

Paraguay	2 - 0	Honduras
United States	0 - 2	Paraguay
Argentina	1 - 0	Paraguay

==== Quarterfinals ====
Colombia	2 - 0	Paraguay

=== Handball ===
==== Men's Competitions ====
Rank	Team
1.	Cuba
2.	Brazil
3.	Argentina
4.	United States
5.	Paraguay
6.	Puerto Rico

== See also ==
- Paraguay at the 1996 Summer Olympics
