= Water skiing at the 2023 Pan American Games – Women's wakeboard =

Women's wakeboard at the 2023 Pan American Games
- Venue: Laguna Los Morros
- Dates: October 21 - October 23
- Competitors: 8 from 8 nations

Medalists
Gold medal	Eugenia de Armas	Argentina
Silver medal	Mary Howell	United States
Bronze medal	Ignacia Holscher	Chile

The women's wakeboard competition of the water skiing events at the 2023 Pan American Games will be held from October 21 to 23 at Laguna Los Morros in Santiago, Chile.

== Schedule ==
Date	Time	Round
October 21, 2023	13:30	Heat 1
October 21, 2023	14:00	Heat 2
October 22, 2023	15:40	Last Chance Qualifiers
October 23, 2023	16:10	Final

== Results ==
=== Heats ===
==== Heat 1 ====
Rank	Name	Country	Result	Notes
1	Mary Howell	United States	81.67	Q
2	Mariana Nep	Brazil	63.33	Q
3	Ashley Leugner	Canada	58.33	L
4	Ana Sisul	Paraguay	42.22	L

==== Heat 2 ====
Rank	Name	Country	Result	Notes
1	Eugenia de Armas	Argentina	85.00	Q
2	Ignacia Holscher	Chile	73.33	Q
3	Fernanda Larios	Mexico	56.11	L
4	Manuela Durán	Colombia	36.67	L

==== Last Chance Qualifiers ====
Rank	Name	Country	Result	Notes
1	Fernanda Larios	Mexico	77.22	Q
2	Ashley Leugner	Canada	75.00	Q
3	Ana Sisul	Paraguay	51.67	
4	Manuela Durán	Colombia	40.00	

=== Final ===
Rank	Name	Country	Result	Notes
1st place, gold medalist(s)	Eugenia de Armas	Argentina	83.11	
2nd place, silver medalist(s)	Mary Howell	United States	80.56	
3rd place, bronze medalist(s)	Ignacia Holscher	Chile	64.89	
4	Fernanda Larios	Mexico	53.89	
5	Ashley Leugner	Canada	40.00	
6	Mariana Nep	Brazil	35.78	
