= Valery Plata =

Colombian professional golfer (born 2001)

Personal information
- Full name: Valery Plata Pardo
- Nationality: Colombia
- Born: 2 June 2001 (age 25) Hialeah, Florida, U.S.
- Height: 5 ft 2 in (1.57 m)

Career
- Sport: Golf
- College: Michigan State University
- Turned professional: 2022
- Current tour: LPGA Tour (joined 2023)
- Professional wins: 1

Number of wins by tour
- Epson Tour: 1

Best results in LPGA major championships
- Chevron Championship: DNP
- Women's PGA C'ship: DNP
- U.S. Women's Open: DNP
- Women's British Open: CUT: 2022
- Evian Championship: CUT: 2022

Achievements and awards
- Big Ten Player of the Year: 2020
- Big Ten Mary Fossum Award: 2021
Medal record
Women's golf
Representing Colombia
Event	1st	2nd	3rd
Bolivarian Games	1	0	1
South American Youth Games	1	1	0
Total	2	1	1
Bolivarian Games
Gold medal – first place	2022 Valledupar	Mixed team
Bronze medal – third place	2022 Valledupar	Individual
South American Youth Games
Gold medal – first place	2017 Santiago	Individual
Silver medal – second place	2017 Santiago	Mixed team

Valery Plata Pardo (Note: In this Spanish name, the first or paternal surname is Plata and the second or maternal family name is Pardo.) (born 2 June 2001) is a Colombian professional golfer and LPGA Tour player.

== Early life and amateur career ==
Although born in Florida, United States, Plata is a Colombian citizen who grew up in Bucaramanga, Colombia, as a neighbor to Mariajo Uribe, winner of the 2007 U.S. Amateur.

Plata qualified for the 2015 and 2016 U.S. Girls' Junior Championship and represented Colombia at the 2017 Junior Golf World Cup in Japan. She won gold at the 2017 Youth South American Games in Chile. With the Colombia team she won the South American U-15 Team Championship in 2015 and 2016, and the South American U-18 Team Championship in 2017 and 2018.

She attended Michigan State University between 2018 and 2022. Playing with the Michigan State Spartans women's golf team, Plata was a three-time All-Big Ten First Team selection, and named Big Ten Player of the Year in 2020 as a sophomore. In 2021, she won the Big Ten's Mary Fossum Award, an honor given to the Big Ten Conference player with the season's lowest stroke average to par.

Plata played in the Meijer LPGA Classic twice as an amateur, in 2021 and 2022, and made the cut in her first LPGA Tour start. She won the 2021 Women's Amateur Latin America in Argentina, which gave her a place in the field at the 2022 Evian Championship and the 2022 Women's British Open.

Plata represented Colombia at the 2022 Espirito Santo Trophy. At the 2022 Bolivarian Games in Valledupar, Colombia, she won the individual bronze and the mixed team gold, together with Camilo Aguado, Santiago Gomez and Mariajo Uribe, who is also her mentor.

== Professional career ==
Plata turned professional in November 2022. She finished tied 3rd at LPGA Tour Q-School to earn an LPGA Tour card for 2023.

== Amateur wins ==
- 2015 South American U-15 Championship
- 2016 Torneo Internacional Infantil y Juvenil, Colombian Junior International, Abierto Eje Cafetero
- 2017 Torneo Internacional Infantil y Juvenil, Nacional Juvenil Copa Arturo Calle, Juegos Sudamericanos de la Juventud
- 2018 Nacional Juvenil Copa Arturo Calle, Torneo Aficionado Copa Fortox Bucaramanga
- 2019 Abierto de Golf Ciudad de Bucaramanga, Ruth's Chris Tar Heel Invite
- 2021 Indiana Invitational, Women's Amateur Latin America, Patriot All-America Invitational

== Professional wins (1) ==
=== Epson Tour wins (1) ===
- 2024 Florida's Natural Charity Classic

== Results in LPGA majors ==
Tournament	2022
Chevron Championship	
U.S. Women's Open	
Women's PGA Championship	
The Evian Championship	CUT
Women's British Open	CUT

Did not play

CUT = missed the half-way cut

== Team appearances ==
Amateur

- South American U-15 Team Championship (representing Colombia): 2015 (winners), 2016 (winners)
- South American U-18 Team Championships (representing Colombia): 2017 (winners), 2018 (winners)
- South American Youth Games (representing Colombia): 2017
- Junior Golf World Cup (representing Colombia): 2017
- Bolivarian Games (representing Colombia): 2022 (winners)
- Espirito Santo Trophy (representing Colombia): 2022
