= Paraguay at the 2007 Pan American Games =

- IOC code: PAR
- NOC: Comité Olímpico Paraguayo
- Website: www.cop.org.py

in Rio de Janeiro 13–29 July 2007
- Competitors: 71
- Flag bearer: Fabiana Aluan
- Medals Ranked 25th: Gold 0 Silver 0 Bronze 1 Total 1

Pan American Games appearances (overview)
- 1951; 1955; 1959–1963; 1967; 1971; 1975; 1979; 1983; 1987; 1991; 1995; 1999; 2003; 2007; 2011; 2015; 2019; 2023; 2027

The 15th Pan American Games were held in Rio de Janeiro, Brazil from 13 to 29 July 2007.

== Medals ==
=== Bronze ===
===== Futsal =====
- Men's Team Competition: Paraguay national futsal team

== Results by event ==
=== Football ===
==== Group B ====
	Team	Pts	Pld	W	D	L	GF	GA	GD
1	United States	9	4	3	0	1	15	5	+10
2	Mexico	9	4	3	0	1	10	3	+7
3	Argentina	9	4	3	0	1	8	5	+3
4	Panama	1	4	0	1	3	2	8	-6
5	Paraguay	1	4	0	1	3	4	18	-14

12 July
18:15

United States	7–1	Paraguay
O'Hara 16', 51'; Cheney 18', 37', 49'; Nogueira 66'; McDonald 68'		Alarcón 2'

Estádio Olímpico João Havelange
Referee: Beltrame (BRA)

14 July
18:15

Paraguay	0–5	Mexico
		Valdez 20'; Ocampo 28', 82'; Corral 70', 89'

Estádio Olímpico João Havelange

16 July
11:15

Panama	1–1	Paraguay
Samuels 9'		Agüero 90+'

Estádio Miécimo da Silva

20 July
12:30

Argentina	5–2	Paraguay

Estádio Miécimo da Silva

=== Futsal ===
==== Group A ====
Team	Pts	Pld	W	D	L	GF	GA	Diff
Brazil	9	3	3	0	0	14	1	+13
Paraguay	6	3	2	0	1	4	4	0
Cuba	3	3	1	0	2	5	10	–5
Guatemala	0	3	0	0	3	2	10	–8

23 July

Paraguay	2–1	Cuba

24 July

Paraguay	2–1	Guatemala

Paraguay	0–2	Brazil

==== Semifinals ====
27 July

Paraguay	1–1 (3–4 PSO)	Argentina

==== Bronze Medal ====
28 July

Paraguay	4–4 6–5 AET	Costa Rica

=== Handball ===
==== Group A ====
Team	Pts	Pld	W	D	L	GF	GA	GD
Argentina	9	3	3	0	0	84	52	+32
Dominican Republic	6	3	2	0	1	83	77	+6
Paraguay	3	3	1	0	2	84	88	-4
Puerto Rico	0	3	0	0	3	61	94	-33

13 July
08:00

Dominican Republic	33 – 30	Paraguay

Riocentro Sports Complex

15 July
15:00

Argentina	29 – 23	Paraguay

Riocentro Sports Complex

17 July
20:00

Paraguay	31 – 26	Puerto Rico

Riocentro Sports Complex

==== Classification 5-8 ====
19 July
20:00

Canada	26 – 22	Paraguay

Riocentro Sports Complex

==== Classification 7-8 ====
20 July
17:00

Puerto Rico	21 – 22	Paraguay

Riocentro Sports Complex

== See also ==
- Paraguay at the 2008 Summer Olympics
