= Paraguay at the 2019 Pan American Games =

- IOC code: PAR
- NOC: Paraguayan Olympic Committee

in Lima, Peru 26 July–11 August, 2019
- Competitors: 71 in 18 sports
- Flag bearer: Alejandro Toranzos (opening)
- Medals Ranked 18th: Gold 1 Silver 3 Bronze 1 Total 5

Pan American Games appearances (overview)
- 1951; 1955; 1959–1963; 1967; 1971; 1975; 1979; 1983; 1987; 1991; 1995; 1999; 2003; 2007; 2011; 2015; 2019; 2023

Paraguay competed at the 2019 Pan American Games in Lima, from July 26 to August 11, 2019.

The Paraguayan team consisted of 71 athletes (48 women and 23 men) competing in 18 sports. This marked the largest team the country has ever sent to the Pan American Games.

During the opening ceremony of the games, table tennis athlete Alejandro Toranzos carried the flag of the country as part of the parade of nations.

Paraguay won a total of five medals at the games, a record for one edition of the games. The country also won its first ever gold medal at the Pan American Games when golfer Fabrizio Zanotti won the men's individual event.

== Competitors ==
The following is the list of number of competitors (per gender) participating at the games per sport/discipline.

Sport	Men	Women	Total
Athletics (track and field)	1	2	3
Basketball	0	12	12
Bodybuilding	0	1	1
Canoeing	0	1	1
Equestrian	1	0	1
Football	0	18	18
Golf	2	2	4
Karate	0	1	1
Roller sports	1	0	1
Rowing	5	2	7
Sailing	1	0	1
Shooting	3	0	3
Swimming	5	3	8
Table tennis	3	1	4
Tennis	0	2	2
Volleyball	0	2	2
Water skiing	0	1	1
Wrestling	1	0	1
Total	23	48	71

== Medallists ==
The following competitors from Paraguay won medals at the games. In the by discipline sections below, medalists' names are bolded.

Medal	Name	Sport	Event	Date
Gold	Fabrizio Zanotti	Golf	Men's individual	August 12
Silver	Verónica Cepede Royg; Montserrat González	Tennis	Women's doubles	August 3
Silver	Julieta Granada	Golf	Women's individual	August 12
Silver	Carlos Franco; Fabrizio Zanotti; Julieta Granada; Sofia García	Golf	Mixed team	August 12
Bronze	Verónica Cepede Royg	Tennis	Women's singles	August 4

**Medals by sport**
**Sport**	1st place, gold medalist(s)	2nd place, silver medalist(s)	3rd place, bronze medalist(s)	**Total**
Golf	1	2	0	3
Tennis	0	1	1	2
**Total**	**1**	**3**	**1**	**5**

== Athletics (track and field) ==
Paraguay qualified three athletes (one man and two women).

Key

- Note–Ranks given for track events are for the entire round
- **NR**–National record

Track and road events
Men

Athlete	Event	Final	
Athlete	Event	Result	Rank
Derlis Ayala	Marathon	2:12:54 **NR**	5

Women
Field event

Athlete	Event	Final	
Athlete	Event	Distance	Position
Laura Paredes	Javelin thrw	54.16	9

Combined events – Heptathlon

Athlete	Event	100H	HJ	SP	200 m	LJ	JT	800 m	Final	Rank
Camila Pirelli	Result	13.54	1.62	13.92	24.82	5.47	48.56	2:15.29	4	5907 **NR**
Camila Pirelli	Points	10.44	759	789	903	691	832	889	4	5907 **NR**

== Basketball ==
Paraguay qualified a women's team (of 12 athletes) by finishing in the top seven nations at the 2017 FIBA Women's AmeriCup. This marks the country's debut in women's basketball at the Pan American Games.

=== Women's tournament ===
Roster

Paraguay women's basketball team roster
Players
Coaches

Pos.	No.	Name	Age – Date of birth	Height	Club	Ctr.
G/F	3	Marta Peralta	25 – 16 July 1994	1.73 m (5 ft 8 in)
C	4	Ilda Peña	35 – 9 January 1984	1.80 m (5 ft 11 in)
G/F	5	Paola Ferrari (C)	33 – 16 September 1985	1.78 m (5 ft 10 in)
G	6	Melina Pérez	33 – 26 January 1986	1.65 m (5 ft 5 in)
F/C	7	Astrid Hutteman	27 – 4 April 1992	1.78 m (5 ft 10 in)
F	8	Natalia Quevedo	21 – 13 January 1998	1.75 m (5 ft 9 in)
C	9	Patricia Rojas	31 – 26 October 1987	1.75 m (5 ft 9 in)
F/C	10	Tamara Insfrán	30 – 26 July 1989	1.75 m (5 ft 9 in)
C	11	María Caraves	27 – 31 May 1992	1.74 m (5 ft 9 in)
F/C	12	Andrea Gómez	29 – 28 January 1990	1.73 m (5 ft 8 in)
F	13	Paloma Niz	20 – 18 January 1999	1.72 m (5 ft 8 in)
F/C	14	Ximena Ibarra	17 – 11 October 2001	1.72 m (5 ft 8 in)

Head coach

- (Paraguay) Juan Pablo Feliú

Assistant coach(es)

- (Paraguay) Alberto Cano

Legend

- **(C)** Team captain
- **Club** – describes current club
- **Age** – describes age
  on 6 August 2019

Group A

Team	Pld	W	L	PF	PA	PD	Pts	Qualification
Brazil	3	3	0	224	166	+58	**6**	Qualified for the Semifinals
Puerto Rico	3	2	1	221	200	+21	**5**	Qualified for the Semifinals
Canada	3	1	2	224	215	+9	**4**	
Paraguay	3	0	3	174	262	−88	**3**	

6 August 2019
10:30

Report

**Puerto Rico**	**91**–73	Paraguay
Scoring by quarter: **26**–14, 18–18, **24**–21, **23**–20
Pts: Gwathmey 21; Rebs: Rosado 11; Asts: O'Neill 6		Pts: Ferrari 18; Rebs: Ferrari 8 Asts: Ferrari 6

Coliseo Eduardo Dibos, Lima
Referees: Leandro Lezcano (ARG)

7 August 2019
10:30

Report

Paraguay	64–**90**	**Canada**
Scoring by quarter: 17–**22**, 18–**19**, 13–**23**, 16–**26**
Pts: Ferrari 28; Rebs: Ferrari, Caraves 5 Asts: Peralta 3		Pts: Hill 14; Rebs: Hamblin 10; Asts: Pellington 3

Coliseo Eduardo Dibos, Lima
Referees: Steven Anderson (USA)

8 August 2019
18:00

Report

Paraguay	37–**81**	**Brazil**
Scoring by quarter: 10–**21**, 12–**14**, 5–**21**, 10–**25**
Pts: Ferrari 10; Rebs: Ferrari 7 Asts: Insfrán, Caraves 2		Pts: Soares 15; Rebs: Teixeira 8 Asts: Paixão 4

Coliseo Eduardo Dibos, Lima
Referees: Andrés Bartel (URU)

Seventh place match

9 August 2019
10:30

Report

**Paraguay**	**69**–61	Virgin Islands
Scoring by quarter: **23**–14, 12–**15**, 19–**22**, **15**–10
Pts: Ferrari 28; Rebs: Ferrari 6 Asts: Ferrari 7		Pts: George 19; Rebs: George 13; Asts: Tate 5

Coliseo Eduardo Dibos, Lima
Referees: Andréia Silva (BRA)

== Bodybuilding ==
Paraguay qualified one female bodybuilder.

Women

Athlete	Event	Prejudging		Final	
Athlete	Event	Points	Rank	Points	Rank
Jessica Santacruz	Bikini fitness	—N/a		did not advance	

- No results were provided for the prejudging round, with only the top six advancing.

== Canoeing ==
=== Slalom ===
Paraguay qualified a total of one female slalom athlete.

Key

- Note–Ranks given are within the heat
- **Q** = Qualified for the next round directly

Women

Athlete(s)	Event	Heat						Semifinal		Final	
Athlete(s)	Event	Run 1	Rank	Run 2	Rank	Best	Rank	Time	Rank	Time	Rank
Ana Fernández	C-1	108.79	4	105.56	5	105.56	5	115.78	4 **Q**	108.85	4
Ana Fernández	K-1	103.37	4	103.70	4	103.37	4	115.64	6 **Q**	116.43	5
Ana Fernández	Extreme K-1	—N/a	2 **Q**	—N/a				—N/a	3	did not advance	

== Equestrian ==
Paraguay qualified one athlete in equestrian.

=== Jumping ===
Athlete	Horse	Event	Qualification								Final					
Athlete	Horse	Event	Round 1		Round 2		Round 3		Total		Round A		Round B		Total	
Athlete	Horse	Event	Faults	Rank	Faults	Rank	Faults	Rank	Faults	Rank	Faults	Rank	Faults	Rank	Faults	Rank
Stieven Bardwin	Quinn	Individual	14.62	37	13	29	13	23	40.62	34 **Q**	8	13 **Q**	5	14	13	17

== Football ==
Paraguay qualified a women's team (of 18 athletes) by finishing in one of the three qualification spots at the 2018 Copa América Femenina.

=== Women's tournament ===
Roster

The following players were called up for the games.

No.	Pos.	Player	Date of birth (age)	Caps	Club
12	GK	Isabel Ortiz	28 December 2001 (aged 17)		(Paraguay) Sol de América
1	GK	Cristina Recalde	29 September 1994 (aged 24)		(Paraguay) Sol de América
14	DF	Lorena Alonso	1 April 1998 (aged 21)		(Paraguay) Sol de América
4	DF	Daysy Bareiro	19 January 2001 (aged 18)		(Paraguay) Sol de América
5	DF	Laurie Cristaldo	4 May 1997 (aged 22)		(Paraguay) Libertad/Limpeño
13	DF	Limpia Fretes	24 June 2000 (aged 19)		(Paraguay) Cerro Porteño
3	DF	Tania Riso	26 January 1994 (aged 25)		(Paraguay) Deportivo Capiatá
2	DF	María Martínez	24 May 1999 (aged 20)		(Paraguay) Deportivo Capiatá
6	MF	Damia Cortaza	29 September 1993 (aged 25)		(Paraguay) Libertad/Limpeño
8	MF	Fanny Godoy	21 January 1998 (aged 21)		(Paraguay) Sol de América
15	MF	Ivana Mendoza	19 May 1995 (aged 24)		(Paraguay) Sol de América
17	MF	Rosa Miño	13 July 1999 (aged 20)		(Brazil) Foz Cataratas
16	MF	Dulce Quintana	6 February 1989 (aged 30)		(Spain) Espanyol
7	FW	Lice Chamorro	22 December 1998 (aged 20)		(Paraguay) Racing Santander
10	FW	Jessica Martínez	14 June 1999 (aged 20)		(Spain) Tacón
18	FW	Mirta Pico	8 February 1994 (aged 25)		(Paraguay) Sol de América
9	FW	Fabiola Sandoval	27 May 1999 (aged 20)		(Paraguay) Libertad/Limpeño
11	FW	Gloria Villamayor	10 April 1992 (aged 27)		(Spain) Real Oviedo

Group A

Pos	Team	Pld	W	D	L	GF	GA	GD	Pts	Qualification
1	Paraguay	3	2	1	0	5	2	+3	**7**	Knockout stage
2	Colombia	3	1	2	0	4	2	+2	**5**	Knockout stage
3	Mexico	3	1	1	1	5	4	+1	**4**	Fifth place match
4	Jamaica	3	0	0	3	1	7	−6	**0**	Seventh place match

Source: Lima 2019
Rules for classification: Tie-breakers
28 July 2019
13:00

Paraguay	0–0	Colombia
	Report

Estadio Universidad San Marcos
Referee: Deborah Cruz (Brazil)

31 July 2019
10:00

Mexico	1–2	Paraguay
Mayor 36'	Report	Cristaldo 9'; Sandoval 45'

Estadio Universidad San Marcos
Referee: Silvia Ríos (Uruguay)

3 August 2019
13:00

Paraguay	3–1	Jamaica
J. Martínez 4', 63'; Quintana 90+1'	Report	Hudson-Marks 31'

Estadio Universidad San Marcos
Referee: Elizabeth Tintaya (Peru)

Semifinals

6 August 2019
17:30

Paraguay	0–3	Argentina
	Report	Larroquette 13' (pen.); Cometti 20'; Oviedo 34'

Estadio Universidad San Marcos
Referee: Dione Rissios (Chile)

Bronze medal match

9 August 2019
17:30

Paraguay	0–1	Costa Rica (bronze)
	Report	D. Cruz 82'

Estadio Universidad San Marcos
Referee: Silvia Ríos (Uruguay)

== Golf ==
Paraguay qualified a full team of four golfers (two men and two women).

Athlete(s)	Event	Final						
Athlete(s)	Event	Round 1	Round 2	Round 3	Round 4	Total	To par	Rank
Carlos Franco	Men's individual	71	69	71	71	283	−1	19
**Fabrizio Zanotti**	Men's individual	64	67	68	70	269	−15	1st place, gold medalist(s)
Sofia García	Women's individual	74	71	71	72	288	+4	7
**Julieta Granada**	Women's individual	70	71	71	68	280	−4	2nd place, silver medalist(s)
**Carlos Franco**; **Fabrizio Zanotti**; **Sofia García**; **Julieta Granada**	Mixed team	134	138	139	138	549	−19	2nd place, silver medalist(s)

== Karate ==
Paraguay qualified one female karateka in the kumite discipline.

Kumite
Women

Athlete	Event	Round Robin				Semifinals	Final	
Athlete	Event	Opposition Result	Opposition Result	Opposition Result	Rank	Opposition Result	Opposition Result	Rank
Leyla Servin	–50 kg	González (GUA); **L** 0–4	Hernández (MEX); **L** 0–1	Villanueva (DOM); **L** 0–4	4	did not advance		

== Roller sports ==
Paraguay qualified one male skater in the artistic discipline.

=== Artistic ===
Athlete	Event	Short program		Long program		Final	
Athlete	Event	Points	Rank	Points	Rank	Points	Rank
Víctor López	Free skating	50.07	2	70.69	4	120.76	4

== Rowing ==
Paraguay qualified seven rowers (five men and two women).

Men

Athlete	Event	Heats		Repechage		Semifinals		Final	
Athlete	Event	Time	Rank	Time	Rank	Time	Rank	Time	Rank
Javier Insfran	Single sculls	7:11.23	3 **SA/B**	Bye		7:08.21	2 **FA**	7:12.86	4
Franco Chiola; Arturo Rivarola	Double sculls	7:03.93	6 **R**	6:49.54	5 **FB**	—N/a		did not start	
Guillermo Fleitas; Matias Ramirez	Lwt double sculls	6:38.01	3 **R**	6:37.75	3 **FB**	—N/a		6:43.50	8

Women

Athlete	Event	Heats		Repechage		Final	
Athlete	Event	Time	Rank	Time	Rank	Time	Rank
Alejandra Alonso	Single sculls	8:12.00	4 **R**	7:48.10	3 **FB**	8:03.14	7
Gabriela Mosqueira	Lwt single sculls	8:13.82	4 **R**	7:55.42	2 **FA**	7:59.16	6

Qualification Legend: FA=Final A (medal); FB=Final B (non-medal); SA/B=Semifinals A/B; R=Repechage
- Results given are within the heat.

== Sailing ==
Paraguay received a universality spot in the men's laser event.

Key

- **RET**= Retired
- **STP**= Standard penalty

Men

Athlete	Event	Race											Net Points	Final Rank
Athlete	Event	1	2	3	4	5	6	7	8	9	10	M	Net Points	Final Rank
Federico Cabello	Laser	RET	22	STP	20	21	19	21	22	20	STP	Did not qualify	191	22

== Shooting ==
Paraguay qualified 3 male sport shooters.

Men

Athlete	Event	Qualification		Final	
Athlete	Event	Points	Rank	Points	Rank
Antonio Valiente	Skeet	100	27	did not advance	
Jose Gomez	Trap	99	=26	did not advance	
Paulo Reichardt	Trap	99	27	did not advance	

== Swimming ==
Paraguay qualified eight swimmers.

Key

- Note – Ranks given are for the entire round
- **QA** – Qualified for Final A
- **QB** – Qualified for Final B

Men

Athlete	Event	Heat		Final	
Athlete	Event	Time	Rank	Time	Rank
Ben Hockin	50 m freestyle	23.26	17	did not advance	
Ben Hockin	100 m freestyle	50.28	14 **QB**	49.89	9
Ben Hockin	100 m butterfly	53.43	6 **QA**	53.70	7
Matheo Mateos	200 m freestyle	1:53.12	16 **QB**	1:53.03	15
Matheo Mateos	400 m freestyle	4:00.39	13 **QB**	4:02.81	14
Charles Hockin	100 m backstroke	55.53	6 **QA**	55.62	6
Matías López	200 m backstroke	2:07.30	17	did not advance	
Matías López	200 m individual medley	2:09.64	22	did not advance	
Matías López	400 m individual medley	4:36.13	16 **QB**	Withdrew	
Renato Prono	100 m breaststroke	1:03.08	18	did not advance	
Charles Hockin; Renato Prono; Ben Hockin; Matheo Mateos	4 × 100 m medley relay	3:44.28	4 **QA**	3:43.75	6

Women

Athlete	Event	Heat		Final	
Athlete	Event	Time	Rank	Time	Rank
Nicole Rautemberg	200 m freestyle	2:07.74	15 **QB**	2:07.20	15
Maria Jose Arrua	100 m backstroke	1:07.25	22	did not advance	
Maria Jose Arrua	200 m backstroke	2:27.31	21	did not advance	
Sofia Lopez Chaparro	100 m breaststroke	1:15.99	17	did not advance	
Sofia Lopez Chaparro	200 m individual medley	2:29.63	21	did not advance	

== Table tennis ==
Paraguay qualified a men's team of three athletes by winning the bronze medal at the 2018 Pan American Championships in Santiago, Chile. Paraguay later qualified one female at the final qualification tournament.

Single and doubles

Athlete	Event	Round of 32	Round of 16	Quarterfinals	Semifinals	Final	Rank
Athlete	Event	Opposition Result	Opposition Result	Opposition Result	Opposition Result	Opposition Result	Rank
Marcelo Aguirre	Men's singles	Moscoso (GUA); **W** 4–0	González (PUR); **W** 4–0	Wang (CAN); **L** 2–4	did not advance		
Alejandro Toranzos	Men's singles	Afanador (PUR); **L** 2–4	did not advance				
Marcelo Aguirre; Alejandro Toranzos	Men's doubles	—N/a	Hazin / Wang (CAN); **L** 3–4	did not advance			
Leyla Gomez	Women's singles	Díaz (PUR); **L** 2–4	did not advance				
Marcelo Aguirre; Leyla Gomez	Mixed doubles	—N/a	Wu / Ortiz (DOM); **L** 2–4	did not advance			

Team

Athlete	Event	Group Stage				Quarterfinals	Semifinals	Final
Athlete	Event	Opposition Result	Opposition Result	Rank	Opposition Result	Opposition Result	Opposition Result	Rank
Marcelo Aguirre; Alejandro Toranzos; Santiago Osorio	Men's team	Argentina; **L** 2–3	Peru; **W** 3–1	2 **Q**	Brazil; **L** 0–3	did not advance		=5

== Tennis ==
Paraguay qualified two female tennis players.

Women

Athlete	Event	Round of 32	Round of 16	Quarterfinals	Semifinals	Final / BM	
Athlete	Event	Opposition Score	Opposition Score	Opposition Score	Opposition Score	Opposition Score	Rank
Montserrat González	Singles	Dolehide (USA); **L** 4–6, 6–2, 4–6	did not advance				
**Verónica Cepede Royg**	Singles	Bye	Schaefer (PER); **W** 6–2, 6–2	Bui (CAN); **W** 6–4, 6–0	Podoroska (ARG); **L** 3–6, 4–6	Alves (BRA); **W** 6–3, 6–4	3rd place, bronze medalist(s)
**Montserrat González**; **Verónica Cepede Royg**	Doubles	—N/a	Reasco / Römer (ECU); **W** 6–1, 6–2	Olmos / Rarazúa (MEX); **W** 6–7, 6–3, [10–4]	Alves / Stefani (BRA); **W** 7–5, 6–7, [10–4]	Arconada / Dolehide (USA); **L** 0–6, 4–6	2nd place, silver medalist(s)

== Volleyball ==
=== Beach ===
Paraguay qualified a women's pair. This will mark the debut of the country in this discipline at the Pan American Games.

Athletes	Event	Preliminary Round				Qualifying	Quarterfinals	5–8th place	7th place	Rank
Athletes	Event	Opposition Score	Opposition Score	Opposition Score	Rank	Opposition Score	Opposition Score	Opposition Score	Opposition Score	Rank
Patricia Caballero; Michelle Valiente	Women's	Delís / Martínez (CUB); **L** 1–2 (21–16, 12–21, 13–15)	Allcca / Mendoza (PER); **W** 2–0 (21–10, 21–17)	Vargas / Vasquez (ESA); **W** 2–0 (21–17, 21–13)	2	Orellana / Revuelta (MEX); **W** 2–0 (13–21, 21–16, 16–14)	Cook / Pardon (USA); **L** 0–2 (8–21, 10–21)	Ayala / Ríos (COL); **L** 0–2 (19–21, 16–21)	Araya / Valenciano (CRC); **W** 2–0 (21–16, 22–20)	7

== Water skiing ==
Paraguay qualified one female wake boarder. This marks the country's Pan American Games debut in the sport.

Key

- Note–Ranks given for are within the heat
- **LCQ** = Qualified for the Last chance qualifying round
- **Q** = Qualified for the next round directly

Women

Athlete	Event	Semifinal	Rank	Last chance	Rank	Final	Rank
Ana Sisul	Wakeboard	14.00	4 **LCQ**	32.11	2 **Q**	29.00	6

== Wrestling ==
Paraguay received one wild card in the men's freestyle discipline.

Freestyle
Men

Athlete	Event	Round of 16	Quarterfinals	Semifinals	Repechage	Final / BM	Rank
Athlete	Event	Opposition Result	Opposition Result	Opposition Result	Opposition Result	Opposition Result	Rank
Diego Ramírez	-86 kg	Torreblanca (CUB); **L** 0–12	did not advance		Moore (CAN); **L** 0–10	Did not advance	=7

== See also ==
- Paraguay at the 2020 Summer Olympics
