= Paraguay at the 2011 Pan American Games =

- IOC code: PAR
- NOC: Comité Olímpico Paraguayo
- Website: www.cop.org.py

in Guadalajara 14–30 October 2011
- Competitors: 28 in 10 sports
- Flag bearer: Ben Hockin
- Medals Ranked 24th: Gold 0 Silver 0 Bronze 2 Total 2

Pan American Games appearances (overview)
- 1951; 1955; 1959–1963; 1967; 1971; 1975; 1979; 1983; 1987; 1991; 1995; 1999; 2003; 2007; 2011; 2015; 2019; 2023

Paraguay competed at the 2011 Pan American Games in Guadalajara, Mexico from October 14 to 30, 2011. Gerardo Paniagua was the Chef de mission. Ben Hockin, a swimmer who won multiple medals at the 2010 South American Games, was selected to carry the flag during the opening ceremonies. Paraguay's delegation consisted of 28 athletes competing in 10 sports.

== Medalists ==
Medal	Name	Sport	Event	Date
Bronze	Esteban Casarino; Carlos Caballero	Squash	Men's Doubles	October 16
Bronze	Ben Hockin	Swimming	Men's 200 metre freestyle	October 18

== Athletics ==
Paraguay qualified five athletes (four female and one male).

=== Men ===
Event	Athlete	Preliminaries		Semifinal		Final	
Event	Athlete	Result	Rank	Result	Rank	Result	Rank
Augusto Stanley	400 m			47.52	7th	did not advance	
Victor Fatecha	Javelin throw					76.92	5th SB

Women

Event	Athletes	Preliminaries		Semifinal		Final	
Event	Athletes	Result	Rank	Result	Rank	Result	Rank
Catalina Amarilla	Pole vault					3.40	15th
Leryn Franco	Javelin throw					48.70	13th
Olga Subeldia	Javelin throw					49.89	11th

Women

Heptathlon	Event	Anna Pirelli		
Heptathlon	Event	Results	Points	Rank
	100 m hurdles	14.87	7th	943
	High jump	1.56	12th	689
	Shot put	11.74	2nd	727
	200 m	26.20	11th	780
	Long jump	5.17	13th	606
	Javelin throw	36.40	7th	696
	800 m	2:24:24	5th	767
Final			9th	5157

== Roller skating ==
Paraguay qualified one female athlete in artistic roller skating.

Women

Athlete	Event	Qualification		Final	
Athlete	Event	Result	Rank	Result	Rank
Valentina Basaglia	Free skating	107.70	8th	102.80	10th

== Rowing ==
Paraguay qualified two athletes in the rowing competition (one male and one female).

Men

Athlete	Event	Heats		Repechage		Final	
Athlete	Event	Time	Rank	Time	Rank	Time	Rank
Daniel Sosa	Single sculls (M1x)	7:51.40	6th	7:40.59	5th	7:29.38	6th

Women

Athlete	Event	Heats		Repechage		Final	
Athlete	Event	Time	Rank	Time	Rank	Time	Rank
Gabriela Mosqueira	Lightweight single sculls (LW1x)	8:48.83	4th	8:09.09	2nd	8:07.14	4th

== Shooting ==
Paraguay qualified two shooters.

Men

Event	Athlete	Qualification		Final	
Event	Athlete	Score	Rank	Score	Rank
10 m air pistol	Marcelo De Souza	554- 6x	25th	did not advance	
10 m air pistol	Oscar Ricciardi	560-10x	20th	did not advance	

== Squash ==
Paraguay qualified three athletes in the squash competition.

Men

Athlete	Event	Round of 32	Round of 16	Quarterfinals	Semifinals	Final
Athlete	Event	Opposition Score	Opposition Score	Opposition Score	Opposition Score	Opposition Score
Esteban Casarino	Singles		Andres Vargas (COL); W 11-6, 11-8, 7-11, 11-4	Arturo Salazar (MEX); L 6-11, 4-11, 2-11	did not advance	
Andre L'Heureux	Singles	Shawn Simpson (BAR); W 7-11, 11-4, 5-11, 11-6, 11-2	Shawn Delierre (CAN); L 0-11, 3-11, 7-11	did not advance		
Carlos Caballero; Esteban Casarino	Doubles		Andrés Duany (PER); Diego Elías (PER); W WO 11-0, 11-0	Andrés Vargas (COL); Javier Castilla (COL); W 11-9, 4-11, 11-10	Christopher Gordon (USA); Julian Illingworth (USA); L 8-11, 10-11 (bronze)	did not advance

Athletes	Event	Preliminaries Group Stage			Quarterfinal	Semifinal	Final	Rank
Athletes	Event	Opposition Result	Opposition Result	Opposition Result	Opposition Result	Opposition Result	Opposition Result	Rank
Carlos Caballero; Esteban Casarino; Andre L'Heureux	Team	Brazil; L 0-3, 0-3, 0-3	Argentina; L 1-3, 2-3, 0-3	Peru; W 0-3, 3-0, 3-2	did not advance			

== Swimming ==
Paraguay qualified six swimmers (five male and one female).

Men

Event	Athletes	Heats		Final	
Event	Athletes	Time	Position	Time	Position
100 m Freestyle	Benjamin Hockin	49.91	8th Q	50.03	8th
200 m Freestyle	Benjamin Hockin	1:50.52	3rd	1:48.48	3rd place, bronze medalist(s)
100 m Butterfly	Benjamin Hockin	53.87	6th Q	53.43	7th
100 m Butterfly	Jose Lobo	57.18	15th QB	56.10	7th B
100 m Backstroke	Charles Hockin	57.65	9th Q	57.63	8th
200 m Backstroke	Charles Hockin	2:05.28	8th	did not advance	
100 m Breaststroke	Genaro Prono	1:03.79	11th QB	1:04.22	3rd
100 m Breaststroke	Renato Prono	1:05.72	17th	did not advance	
4 × 100 m Freestyle Relay	Charles Hockin; Renato Prono; Jose Lobo; Benjamin Hockin	3:44.98	8th Q	3:26.19	4th
4 × 200 m Freestyle Relay	Charles Hockin; Renato Prono; Jose Lobo; Benjamin Hockin; Genaro Prono	8:13.03	8th Q	7:54.78	7th
4 × 100 m Medley Relay	Charles Hockin; Genaro Prono; Jose Lobo; Benjamin Hockin; Renato Prono	3:51.42	5th Q	3:45.78	5th

Women

Event	Athletes	Heats		Final	
Event	Athletes	Time	Position	Time	Position
Karen Riveros	100 m Freestyle	1:00.11	16th QB	59.96	7th B

== Table tennis ==
Paraguay qualified one male athlete in table tennis.

Men

Athlete	Event	Round Robin			1st Round	Eighthfinals	Quarterfinals	Semifinals	Final
Athlete	Event	Match 1	Match 2	Match 3	1st Round	Eighthfinals	Quarterfinals	Semifinals	Final
Athlete	Event	Opposition Result	Opposition Result	Opposition Result	Opposition Result	Opposition Result	Opposition Result	Opposition Result	Opposition Result
Marcelo Aguirre	Singles	Geovanny Coello (ECU); W 4 - 0	Dexter St. Louis (TRI); W 4 - 1	Juan Acosta (PER); W 4 - 3		Pierre-Luc Hinse (CAN); W 4 - 1	Ju Lin (DOM); L 0 - 4	did not advance	

== Taekwondo ==
Paraguay received one wild card in taekwondo.

Men

Athlete	Event	Round of 16	Quarterfinals	Semifinals	Final
Athlete	Event	Opposition Result	Opposition Result	Opposition Result	Opposition Result
Osvaldo Caceres	Lightweight (-58kg)	Angel Modesto Mora (CUB); L WDR Ronda3 0:50	did not advance		

== Tennis ==
Paraguay qualified five tennis players (three male and two female).

Men

Athlete	Event	1st Round	Round of 32	Round of 16	Quarterfinals	Semifinals	Final
Athlete	Event	Opposition Score	Opposition Score	Opposition Score	Opposition Score	Opposition Score	Opposition Score
Jose Benitez	Singles	Duilio Beretta (PER); L 2 - 6, 5 - 7	did not advance				
Diego Galeano	Singles	Darian King (BAR); W 6(3) - 7, 7 - 5, 6 - 4	Denis Kudla (USA); L 1 - 6, 4 - 6	did not advance			
Daniel Lopez	Singles	Martín Cuevas (URU); W 7 - 6(6), 6 - 4	Christopher Diaz-Figueroa (GUA); L 6(4) - 7, 6(5) - 7	did not advance			
Jose Benitez; Daniel Lopez	Doubles		Eduardo Schwank (ARG); Horacio Zeballos (ARG); W 6 - 4, 2 - 6, [10-8]	Julio César Campozano (ECU); Roberto Quiroz (ECU); L 4 - 6, 1 - 6	did not advance		

Women

Athlete	Event	1st Round	Round of 32	Round of 16	Quarterfinals	Semifinals	Final
Athlete	Event	Opposition Score	Opposition Score	Opposition Score	Opposition Score	Opposition Score	Opposition Score
Veronica Cepede	Singles	María Irigoyen (ARG); W 6 - 2, 3 - 6, 6 - 2	Ximena Hermoso (MEX); W 6 - 3, 7 - 6(6)	Christina McHale (USA); L 5 - 7, 3 - 6	did not advance		
Isabella Robbiani	Singles	Karen Castiblanco (COL); W 2 - 6, 7 - 5, 6 - 4	Florencia Molinero (ARG); L 3 - 6, 1 - 6	did not advance			

Mixed

Athlete	Event	1st Round	Round of 16	Quarterfinals	Semifinals	Final
Athlete	Event	Opposition Score	Opposition Score	Opposition Score	Opposition Score	Opposition Score
Veronica Cepede; Diego Galeano	Mixed Doubles		Ana Paula de la Peña (MEX); Santiago González (MEX); L 5 - 7, 0 - 6	did not advance		

== Triathlon ==
Paraguay received one wild card in the women's event.

=== Women ===
Athlete	Event	Swim (1.5 km)	Trans 1	Bike (40 km)	Trans 2	Run (10 km)	Total	Rank
Tania Sapoznik	Individual	20:50; 19th	0:26; 5th	LAP				
