= Paraguay at the 2003 Pan American Games =

- IOC code: PAR
- NOC: Comité Olímpico Paraguayo
- Website: www.cop.org.py

in Santo Domingo 1–17 August 2003
- Medals Ranked 33rd: Gold 0 Silver 0 Bronze 0 Total 0

Pan American Games appearances (overview)
- 1951; 1955; 1959–1963; 1967; 1971; 1975; 1979; 1983; 1987; 1991; 1995; 1999; 2003; 2007; 2011; 2015; 2019; 2023

The 14th Pan American Games were held in Santo Domingo, Dominican Republic from 1 to 17 August 2003.

== Results by event ==
=== Athletics ===
Track

Athlete	Event	Heat		Final	
Athlete	Event	Time	Rank	Time	Rank
Jorge Cabrera	Men's 10,000 m	—	—	31:40.79	8

Field

Athlete	Event	Throws						Total	
Athlete	Event	1	2	3	4	5	6	Distance	Rank
Nery Kennedy	Men's Javelin	68.04	X	71.12	72.62	71.67	67.89	72.62 m	6
Leryn Franco	Women's Javelin	48.06	50.21	X	47.62	X	48.40	50.21 m	9

=== Football ===
==== Group A ====
Team	Pts	Pld	W	D	L	GF	GA	GD
Argentina	9	3	3	0	0	7	4	+3
Mexico	4	3	1	1	1	7	6	+1
Paraguay	3	3	1	0	2	3	4	−1
Guatemala	1	3	0	1	2	2	5	−3

August 2, 2003

Argentina	1–0	Paraguay
Cángele 65'

Estadio Mirador Este

August 5, 2003

Paraguay	1–3	Mexico
dos Santos 9'		Partez 46' 52'; Rodríguez 67'

Estadio Mirador Este

August 8, 2003

Guatemala	0–2	Paraguay
		Florentín 39' dos Santos 90'

Estadio San Cristobal
Referee: Ricardo Valenzuela (United States)

=== Swimming ===
==== Men's Competition ====
Athlete	Event	Heat		Final	
Athlete	Event	Time	Rank	Time	Rank
Antonio León	100 m breaststroke	1:09.28	17	did not advance	
Sergio Cabrera	100 m butterfly	57.67	16	57.95	16
Sergio Cabrera	200 m butterfly	2:04.60	10	2:04.54	9

==== Women's Competition ====
Athlete	Event	Heat		Final	
Athlete	Event	Time	Rank	Time	Rank
María Costanzo	100 m backstroke	1:08.49	14	DNS	18
María Costanzo	200 m backstroke	2:38.22	13	DNS	13
Maria Franco	100 m breaststroke	1:18.77	15	1:19.88	15

=== Triathlon ===
Athlete	Event	Race			Total	
Athlete	Event	Swim	Bike	Run	Time	Rank
Carlos Doce	Men's Individual	25:00.500	—	—	DNF	—

== See also ==
- Paraguay at the 2004 Summer Olympics
