= Paraguay at the Pan American Games =

- IOC code: PAR
- NOC: Comité Olímpico Paraguayo
- Website: www.cop.org.py
- Medals Ranked 26th: Gold 2 Silver 5 Bronze 15 Total 22

Pan American Games appearances (overview)
- 1951; 1955; 1959–1963; 1967; 1971; 1975; 1979; 1983; 1987; 1991; 1995; 1999; 2003; 2007; 2011; 2015; 2019; 2023

Paraguay has sent athletes to all editions of the games, except in two editions: 1959 and 1963. Paraguayan athletes have won 2 gold medals, 5 silver and 15 bronze and 22 overall counting the 2023 Panamerican Games in Santiago.

== Hosted Games ==
Paraguay have host the II Junior Pan American Games and is expected to host the upcoming XXI Pan American Games:

| Games | Host city | Dates | Nations | Participants | Events |
|---|---|---|---|---|---|
| 2025 Junior Pan American Games | Asunción | 9 - 23 August | 41 | 3,975 | 336 |
| 2031 Pan American Games | Asunción | Future event | | | |

== Pan American Games ==
=== Medal by games ===
| Year | Edition | Host city | Rank | Gold | Silver | Bronze | Total |
|---|---|---|---|---|---|---|---|
| 1951 | I | (Argentina) Buenos Aires | — | 0 | 0 | 0 | 0 |
| 1955 | II | Mexico City | — | 0 | 0 | 0 | 0 |
| 1959 | III | (United States) Chicago | Did not participate | | | | |
| 1963 | IV | (Brazil) São Paulo | Did not participate | | | | |
| 1967 | V | (Canada) Winnipeg | — | 0 | 0 | 0 | 0 |
| 1971 | VI | (Colombia) Cali | — | 0 | 0 | 0 | 0 |
| 1975 | VII | Mexico City | — | 0 | 0 | 0 | 0 |
| 1979 | VIII | (Puerto Rico) San Juan | — | 0 | 0 | 0 | 0 |
| 1983 | IX | (Venezuela) Caracas | — | 0 | 0 | 0 | 0 |
| 1987 | X | (United States) Indianapolis | 23rd | 0 | 0 | 1 | 1 |
| 1991 | XI | (Cuba) Havana | — | 0 | 0 | 0 | 0 |
| 1995 | XII | (Argentina) Mar del Plata | 21st | 0 | 1 | 2 | 3 |
| 1999 | XIII | (Canada) Winnipeg | — | 0 | 0 | 0 | 0 |
| 2003 | XIV | (Dominican Republic) Santo Domingo | — | 0 | 0 | 0 | 0 |
| 2007 | XV | (Brazil) Rio de Janeiro | 25th | 0 | 0 | 1 | 1 |
| 2011 | XVI | (Mexico) Guadalajara | 25th | 0 | 0 | 2 | 2 |
| 2015 | XVII | (Canada) Toronto | 18th | 0 | 1 | 2 | 3 |
| 2019 | XVIII | (Peru) Lima | 18th | 1 | 3 | 1 | 5 |
| 2023 | XVIX | (Chile) Santiago | 21st | 1 | 0 | 6 | 7 |
| Total | | | 26th | 2 | 5 | 15 | 22 |

=== Medals by sport ===
| Sport | Gold | Silver | Bronze | Total |
|---|---|---|---|---|
| Golf | 2 | 2 | 1 | 5 |
| Tennis | 0 | 1 | 2 | 3 |
| Athletics | 0 | 1 | 0 | 1 |
| Table tennis | 0 | 1 | 0 | 1 |
| Canoeing | 0 | 0 | 2 | 2 |
| Rowing | 0 | 0 | 2 | 2 |
| Taekwondo | 0 | 0 | 2 | 2 |
| Cycling | 0 | 0 | 1 | 1 |
| Futsal | 0 | 0 | 1 | 1 |
| Handball | 0 | 0 | 1 | 1 |
| Karate | 0 | 0 | 1 | 1 |
| Squash | 0 | 0 | 1 | 1 |
| Swimming | 0 | 0 | 1 | 1 |
| Totals (13 entries) | 2 | 5 | 15 | 22 |

== Junior Pan American Games ==
=== Medals by games ===
| Year | Edition | Host city | Rank | Gold | Silver | Bronze | Total |
|---|---|---|---|---|---|---|---|
| 2021 | I | (Colombia) Cali-Valle | 15th | 2 | 4 | 4 | 10 |
| 2025 | II | (Paraguay) Asunción | 14th | 3 | 6 | 14 | 23 |
| Total | | | 16th | 5 | 10 | 18 | 33 |

=== Medals by sport ===
| Sport | Gold | Silver | Bronze | Total |
|---|---|---|---|---|
| Rowing | 3 | 4 | 3 | 10 |
| Squash | 1 | 0 | 2 | 3 |
| Athletics | 1 | 0 | 1 | 2 |
| Golf | 0 | 2 | 1 | 3 |
| Tennis | 0 | 1 | 2 | 3 |
| Handball | 0 | 1 | 1 | 2 |
| Swimming | 0 | 1 | 1 | 2 |
| Artistic skating | 0 | 1 | 0 | 1 |
| Fencing | 0 | 0 | 2 | 2 |
| Taekwondo | 0 | 0 | 2 | 2 |
| 3x3 Basketball | 0 | 0 | 1 | 1 |
| Beach volleyball | 0 | 0 | 1 | 1 |
| Weightlifting | 0 | 0 | 1 | 1 |
| Totals (13 entries) | 5 | 10 | 18 | 33 |

== See also ==
- Paraguay at the Parapan American Games
- Paraguay at the Junior Pan American Games
