= Sofia García =

Paraguayan professional golfer (born 1998)

Personal information
- Full name: Sofia Linette García Peralta
- Nationality: Paraguay
- Born: 22 June 1998 (age 28) Asunción, Paraguay
- Height: 5 ft 7 in (1.70 m)

Career
- Sport: Golf
- College: Texas Tech University
- Turned professional: 2021
- Current tour: LPGA Tour
- Former tour: Epson Tour

Best results in LPGA major championships
- Chevron Championship: DNP
- Women's PGA C'ship: CUT: 2026
- U.S. Women's Open: T51: 2024
- Women's British Open: DNP
- Evian Championship: DNP
Medal record
Pan American Games
Gold medal – first place	2023 Santiago	Individual
Silver medal – second place	2019 Lima	Mixed team
South American Games
Gold medal – first place	2026 Santa Fe	Individual
Gold medal – first place	2026 Santa Fe	Mixed team

Sofia Linette García Peralta (Note: In this Spanish name, the first or paternal surname is García and the second or maternal family name is Peralta.) (born 22 June 1998) is a Paraguayan professional golfer on the LPGA Tour.

== Early life and amateur career ==
García was born in Asunción and enjoyed a successful amateur career. In 2013, she won the South American Junior Championship by ten strokes. She won the South American Amateur Golf Championship two years in a row, in 2015 and 2016, becoming the first winner from her country in this championship. In 2019, she won the Dutch International Junior Open.

She represented Paraguay at the Campeonato Sudamericano Copa Los Andes seven times between 2012 and 2019, and at the Espirito Santo Trophy in 2016 and 2018.

García attended Texas Tech University between 2016 and 2021, playing with the Texas Tech Red Raiders women's golf team. She posted a career stroke average of 72.2, a school record, and won four tournaments. She played on the winning Arnold Palmer Cup teams in 2019 and 2020, and was invited to play in the Augusta National Women's Amateur in 2020 and 2021.

At the 2019 Pan American Games, García teamed with Fabrizio Zanotti, Julieta Granada, and Carlos Franco, to win the silver medal in the mixed team event.

== Professional career ==
García turned professional after graduating in 2021. Getting ready for Q-School, she played on the Women's All-Pro Tour (WAPT) where she was runner-up twice and finished fifth on the Order of Merit.

In 2022, she joined the Epson Tour, where she recorded five top-10 finishes including a season-best runner-up at the Carlisle Arizona Women's Golf Classic, three strokes behind Fátima Fernández Cano.

She qualified for the 2022 U.S. Women's Open after shooting 2-under-par 142 (70-72) in qualifying at Fox Run Golf Club. At Pine Needles Lodge & Golf Club, she shot 72-73-77-74 to finish T-60.

García earned her LPGA Tour card for 2023 via Q-School

== Amateur wins ==
- 2013 South American Junior Championship
- 2014 Abierto Club de Golf del Uruguay, Abierto Sport Frances
- 2015 South American Amateur Golf Championship, Campeonato Sudamericano Juvenil, Abierto Sport Francés
- 2016 South American Amateur Golf Championship
- 2018 Illini Invitational at Medinah
- 2019 Reynolds Lake Oconee Invite, Valspar Augusta Invitational, Dutch International Junior Open, SMU Trinity Forest Invitation
- 2021 Maryb S Kauth Invitational

== Results in LPGA majors ==
Tournament	2022	2023	2024	2025	2026
ANA Inspiration					
U.S. Women's Open	T60		T51		
Women's PGA Championship					CUT
The Evian Championship					
Women's British Open					

Did not play

CUT = missed the half-way cut
"T" = tied

== Team appearances ==
Amateur

- Campeonato Sudamericano Copa Los Andes (representing Paraguay): 2012, 2013, 2014, 2015, 2016, 2018, 2019
- Espirito Santo Trophy (representing Paraguay): 2016, 2018
- Arnold Palmer Cup (representing the International team): 2019 (winners), 2020 (winners)
