= Paraguayan Olympic Committee =

National Olympic Committee

- Country: Paraguay
- [[|]]
- Code: PAR
- Created: 1970
- Recognized: 1970
- Headquarters: Luque, Paraguay
- President: Camilo Pérez
- Secretary General: Roberto Escobar
- Website: www.cop.org.py

The Paraguayan Olympic Committee (Spanish: Comité Olímpico Paraguayo, COP) (IOC Code: PAR) is the National Olympic Committee representing Paraguayan athletes in the International Olympic Committee (IOC) and the Pan American Games. It was created and recognized by the International Olympic Committee in 1970. It is based in Luque, Paraguay, in the Greater Asuncion area.

== Pan American Games ==
=== Medal count ===
Year	Edition	Host city	Rank	Gold	Silver	Bronze	Total
1987	X	(United States) Indianapolis	23rd	0	0	1	1
1991	XI	(Cuba) Havana	—	0	0	0	0
1995	XII	(Argentina) Mar del Plata	21st	0	1	2	3
1999	XIII	(Canada) Winnipeg	—	0	0	0	0
2003	XIV	(Dominican Republic) Santo Domingo	—	0	0	0	0
2007	XV	(Brazil) Rio de Janeiro	25th	0	0	1	1
2011	XVI	(Mexico) Guadalajara	25th	0	0	2	2
2015	XVII	(Canada) Toronto	18th	0	1	2	3
2019	XVIII	(Peru) Lima	18th	1	3	1	5
2023	XIV	(Chile) Santiago	21st	1	0	6	7
Total			26th	2	5	15	22

=== Medals by sport ===
Sport	Gold	Silver	Bronze	Total
Golf	2	2	1	5
Tennis	0	1	2	3
Athletics	0	1	0	1
Table tennis	0	1	0	1
Canoeing	0	0	2	2
Rowing	0	0	2	2
Taekwondo	0	0	2	2
Cycling	0	0	1	1
Futsal	0	0	1	1
Handball	0	0	1	1
Karate	0	0	1	1
Squash	0	0	1	1
Swimming	0	0	1	1
Totals (13 entries)	2	5	15	22

== Olympic Games ==
=== Medals by Summer Games ===
Games	Athletes	Gold	Silver	Bronze	Total	Rank
1968 Mexico City	1	0	0	0	0	–
1972 Munich	3	0	0	0	0	–
1976 Montreal	4	0	0	0	0	–
1980 Moscow	Did Not Participate					
1984 Los Angeles	14	0	0	0	0	–
1988 Seoul	10	0	0	0	0	–
1992 Barcelona	27	0	0	0	0	–
1996 Atlanta	7	0	0	0	0	-
2000 Sydney	5	0	0	0	0	-
2004 Athens	23	0	1	0	1	65
2008 Beijing	6	0	0	0	0	-
2012 London	8	0	0	0	0	–
2016 Rio de Janeiro	11	0	0	0	0	–
2020 Tokyo	8	0	0	0	0	–
2024 Paris	28	0	0	0	0	–
2028 Los Angeles	Future Event					
Total		0	1	0	1	137

=== Medals by Winter Games ===
Games	Athletes	Gold	Silver	Bronze	Total	Rank
2014 Sochi	1	0	0	0	0	–
2018 Pyeongchang	Did Not Participate					
2022 Beijing	Did Not Participate					
Total		0	0	0	0	–

=== Medals by sport ===
Sport	Gold	Silver	Bronze	Total
Football	0	1	0	1
Totals (1 entries)	0	1	0	1

== See also ==
- Paraguay at the Olympics
- Paraguay at the Pan American Games
- Parque Olímpico, Paraguay
