= Athletics at the 2019 Pan American Games – Men's 5000 metres =

Men's 5000 metres at the 2019 Pan American Games
- Venue: Athletics Stadium
- Dates: August 6
- Competitors: 12 from 9 nations
- Winning time: 13:53.87

Medalists
Gold medal	Fernando Daniel Martinez	Mexico
Silver medal	Altobeli da Silva	Brazil
Bronze medal	Carlos Díaz	Chile

The men's 5000 metres competition of the athletics events at the 2019 Pan American Games will take place between the 6 August at the 2019 Pan American Games Athletics Stadium. The defending Pan American Games champion is Juan Luis Barrios from Mexico.

== Records ==
Prior to this competition, the existing world and Pan American Games records were as follows:

World record	Kenenisa Bekele (ETH)	12:37.35	Hengelo, Netherlands	May 31, 2004
Pan American Games record	Ed Moran (USA)	13:25.60	Rio de Janeiro, Brazil	July 23, 2007

== Schedule ==
Date	Time	Round
August 6, 2019	18:45	Final

== Results ==
All times shown are in seconds.

KEY:	q	Fastest non-qualifiers	Q	Qualified	NR	National record	PB	Personal best	SB	Seasonal best	DQ	Disqualified

=== Final ===
The results were as follows:

Rank	Name	Nationality	Time	Notes
1st place, gold medalist(s)	Fernando Daniel Martinez	Mexico	13:53.87	
2nd place, silver medalist(s)	Altobeli da Silva	Brazil	13:54.42	
3rd place, bronze medalist(s)	Carlos Díaz	Chile	13:54.43	
4	Federico Bruno	Argentina	13:55.75	
5	José Juan Esparza	Mexico	13:56.65	
6	José Luis Rojas	Peru	13:57.77	
7	Ederson Pereira	Brazil	13:58.72	
8	Josef Tessema	United States	14:00.19	
9	Mario Pacay	Guatemala	14:00.99	
10	Tyler Day	United States	14:01.13	
11	Daniel Toroya	Bolivia	14:02.96	
12	Iván Darío González	Colombia	14:10.82	
