= Athletics at the 2023 Pan American Games – Men's 5000 metres =

Men's 5000 metres at the 2023 Pan American Games
- Venue: Julio Martínez National Stadium
- Dates: October 31
- Competitors: 8 from 7 nations
- Winning time: 14:47.68

Medalists
Gold medal	Kasey Knevelbaard	United States
Silver medal	Charles Philibert-Thiboutot	Canada
Bronze medal	Altobeli da Silva	Brazil

The men's 5000 metres competition of the athletics events at the 2023 Pan American Games was held on October 29 on the streets of Santiago, Chile.

== Records ==
Prior to this competition, the existing world and Pan American Games records were as follows:

World record	Joshua Cheptegei (UGA)	12:35.36	Monaco	August 14, 2020
Pan American Games record	Ed Moran (USA)	13:25.60	Rio de Janeiro, Brazil	July 23, 2007

== Schedule ==
Date	Time	Round
October 31, 2023	20:10	Final

== Results ==
=== Final ===
The results were as follows:

Rank	Name	Nationality	Time	Notes
1st place, gold medalist(s)	Kasey Knevelbaard	United States	14:47.69	
2nd place, silver medalist(s)	Charles Philibert-Thiboutot	Canada	14:48.02	
3rd place, bronze medalist(s)	Altobeli da Silva	Brazil	14:48.18	
4	Santiago Catrofe	Uruguay	14:50.83	PB
5	Héctor Pagán	Puerto Rico	14:51.07	
6	Emmanuel Bor	United States	14:55.53	
7	Ignacio Velásquez	Chile	14:57.21	
	Fernando Daniel Martinez	Mexico	~~14:47.68~~	DQ
