= Athletics at the 2023 Pan American Games – Men's 1500 metres =

Men's 1500 metres at the 2023 Pan American Games
- Venue: Julio Martínez National Stadium
- Dates: November 2
- Competitors: 12 from 7 nations
- Winning time: 3:39.74

Medalists
Gold medal	Charles Philibert-Thiboutot	Canada
Silver medal	Robert Heppenstall	Canada
Bronze medal	Casey Comber	United States

The men's 1500 metres competition of the athletics events at the 2023 Pan American Games was held on November 2 on the streets of Santiago, Chile.

== Records ==
Prior to this competition, the existing world and Pan American Games records were as follows:

World record	Hicham El Guerrouj (MAR)	3:26.00	Rome, Italy	July 14, 1998
Pan American Games record	Hudson de Souza (BRA)	3:36.32	Rio de Janeiro, Brazil	July 25, 2007

== Schedule ==
Date	Time	Round
November 2, 2023	18:57	Final

== Results ==
=== Final ===
The results were as follows:

Rank	Name	Nationality	Time	Notes
1st place, gold medalist(s)	Charles Philibert-Thiboutot	Canada	3:39.74	
2nd place, silver medalist(s)	Robert Heppenstall	Canada	3:39.76	
3rd place, bronze medalist(s)	Casey Comber	United States	3:39.90	
4	Rob Napolitano	Puerto Rico	3:40.12	
5	Kasey Knevelbaard	United States	3:40.31	
6	Thiago André	Brazil	3:40.48	
7	Diego Lacamoire	Argentina	3:40.67	
8	José Zabala	Argentina	3:41.49	
9	Fernando Martínez	Mexico	3:41.77	SB
10	Guilherme Kurtz	Brazil	3:42.50	
11	Diego Uribe	Chile	3:45.56	
12	Dage Minors	Bermuda	3:57.76	
