= Dayton, New Jersey =

Populated place in Middlesex County, New Jersey, US

- Census-designated place
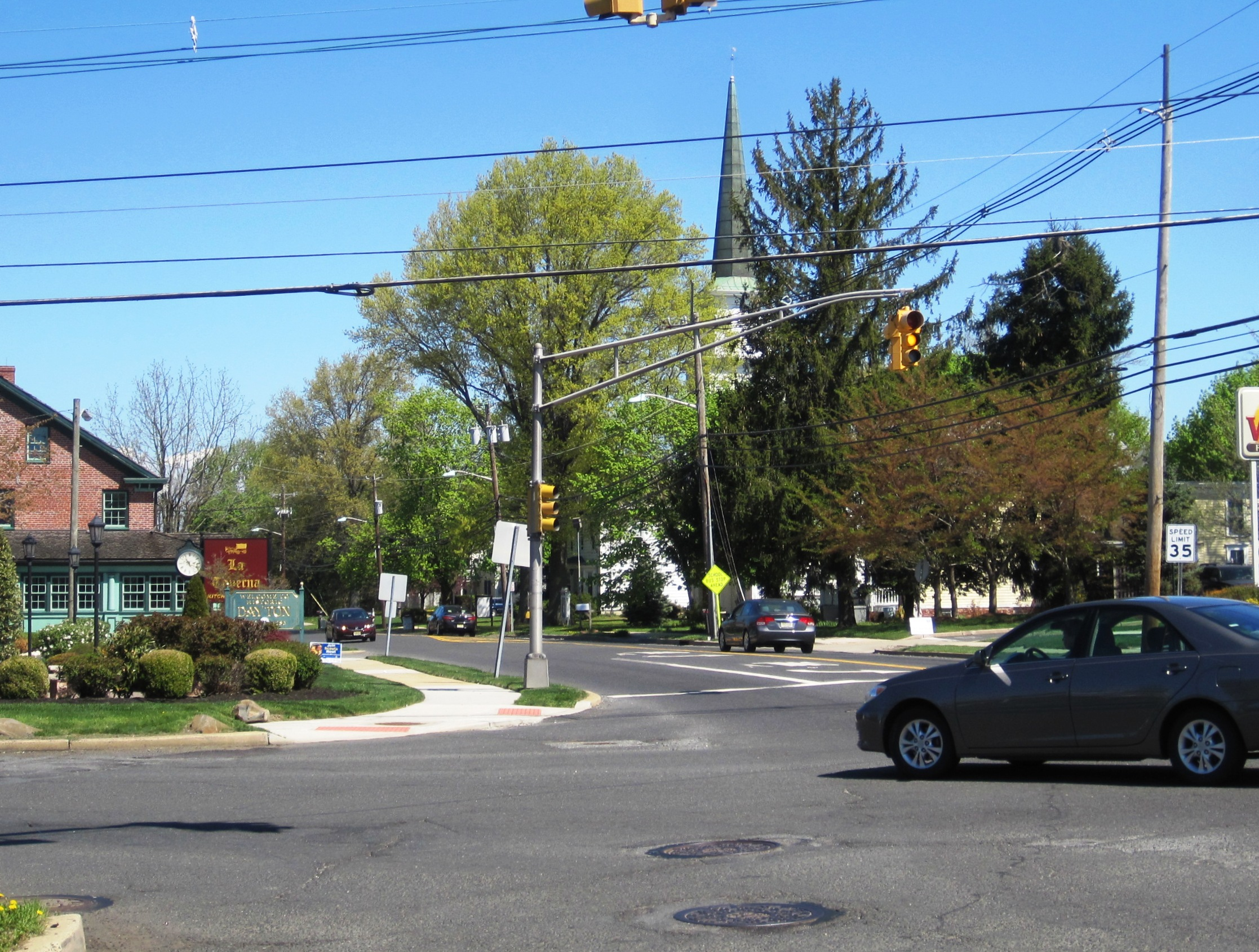
- Center of Dayton

- Map of Dayton CDP in Middlesex County. Inset: Location of Middlesex County in New Jersey.

- Location within Middlesex County, New Jersey Location within New Jersey Location within the United States
- Coordinates: 40.381014°N 74.513355°W
- Country: United States
- State: New Jersey
- County: Middlesex
- Township: South Brunswick
- Named for: Jonathan Dayton or William L. Dayton

Area
  - Total: 2.43 sq mi (6.30 km^{2})
  - Land: 2.41 sq mi (6.24 km^{2})
  - Water: 0.027 sq mi (0.07 km^{2}) 0.13%
- Elevation: 105 ft (32 m)

Population (2020)
  - Total: 8,138
  - Density: 3,380.4/sq mi (1,305.18/km^{2})
- Time zone: UTC−05:00 (Eastern (EST))
  - Summer (DST): UTC−04:00 (Eastern (EDT))
- ZIP Code: 08810
- Area codes: 732/848
- FIPS code: 34-16630
- GNIS feature ID: 02389397

Dayton is an unincorporated community and census-designated place (CDP) in South Brunswick Township, Middlesex County, New Jersey, in the United States. At the 2020 United States census, the CDP's population was 8,138, up from 7,063 in 2010.

Dayton has a post office with its own ZIP Code (08810) that encompasses the entire CDP, as well as some surrounding areas. The community was named for William L. Dayton, a local attorney who later served in the United States Senate, or for Jonathan Dayton, the youngest person to sign the United States Constitution, who later served as a U.S. senator from New Jersey. The area had been known as "Cross Roads" and was renamed in 1866 to avoid confusion with mail that was sent to another post office that shared the name.

== Geography ==
Dayton is in southwestern Middlesex County, in east-central South Brunswick Township. It is bordered to the north by Deans and to the west by Monmouth Junction. U.S. Route 130 forms the eastern border of the Dayton CDP and leads north 10 miles (16 km) to New Brunswick, the Middlesex county seat, and south 7 miles (11 km) to Hightstown.

According to the U.S. Census Bureau, the Dayton CDP has a total area of 2.433 square miles (6.30 km^{2}), including 2.407 square miles (6.23 km^{2}) of land and 0.026 square miles (0.067 km^{2}) of water (1.07%). The community drains southwest toward Devils Brook, a west-flowing tributary of the Millstone River, and northeast toward Lawrence Brook, which flows northeast to join the Raritan River east of New Brunswick.

== Demographics ==
Historical population
Census	Pop.	Note	%±
1990	4,321		—
2000	6,235		44.3%
2010	7,063		13.3%
2020	8,138		15.2%
Population sources: 1950 1960 1970; 1980 1990 2000; 2010 2020

Dayton first appeared as a census designated place in the 1990 U.S. census.

=== Racial and ethnic composition ===
Dayton CDP, New Jersey – Racial and ethnic composition Note: the US Census treats Hispanic/Latino as an ethnic category. This table excludes Latinos from the racial categories and assigns them to a separate category. Hispanics/Latinos may be of any race.
Race / Ethnicity (NH = Non-Hispanic)	Pop 2000	Pop 2010	Pop 2020	% 2000	% 2010	% 2020
White alone (NH)	3,626	2,584	2,323	58.16%	36.59%	28.55%
Black or African American alone (NH)	595	620	703	9.54%	8.78%	8.64%
Native American or Alaska Native alone (NH)	14	11	13	0.22%	0.16%	0.16%
Asian alone (NH)	1,561	3,248	4,394	25.04%	45.99%	53.99%
Native Hawaiian or Pacific Islander alone (NH)	3	1	0	0.05%	0.01%	0.00%
Other race alone (NH)	20	28	35	0.32%	0.40%	0.43%
Mixed race or Multiracial (NH)	95	163	173	1.52%	2.31%	2.13%
Hispanic or Latino (any race)	321	408	497	5.15%	5.78%	6.11%
Total	6,235	7,063	8,138	100.00%	100.00%	100.00%

=== 2020 census ===
As of the 2020 census, Dayton had a population of 8,138. The median age was 41.5 years. 22.0% of residents were under the age of 18 and 12.6% of residents were 65 years of age or older. For every 100 females there were 98.3 males, and for every 100 females age 18 and over there were 92.6 males age 18 and over.

99.0% of residents lived in urban areas, while 1.0% lived in rural areas.

There were 2,708 households in Dayton, of which 43.0% had children under the age of 18 living in them. Of all households, 71.4% were married-couple households, 8.5% were households with a male householder and no spouse or partner present, and 17.7% were households with a female householder and no spouse or partner present. About 11.9% of all households were made up of individuals and 5.4% had someone living alone who was 65 years of age or older.

There were 2,778 housing units, of which 2.5% were vacant. The homeowner vacancy rate was 0.4% and the rental vacancy rate was 6.3%.

=== 2010 census ===
The 2010 United States census counted 7,063 people, 2,288 households, and 1,901 families in the CDP. The population density was 3,365.0 people per square mile (1,299.2 people/km^{2}). There were 2,347 housing units at an average density of 1,118.2 units per square mile (431.7 units/km^{2}). The racial makeup was 40.15% (2,836) White, 9.19% (649) Black or African American, 0.18% (13) Native American, 46.00% (3,249) Asian, 0.01% (1) Pacific Islander, 1.63% (115) from other races, and 2.83% (200) from two or more races. Hispanic or Latino of any race were 5.78% (408) of the population.

Of the 2,288 households, 52.8% had children under 18; 70.0% were married couples living together; 10.4% had a female householder with no husband present, and 16.9% were non-families. Of all households, 13.5% were individuals, and 3.9% had someone 65 or older living alone. The average household size was 3.09, and the average family size was 3.44.

30.1% of the population were under 18, 7.3% from 18 to 24, 29.8% from 25 to 44, 27.1% from 45 to 64, and 5.7% who were 65 years of age or older. The median age was 36.0 years. For every 100 females, the population had 92.5 males. For every 100 females ages 18 and older, there were 89.3 males.

=== 2000 census ===
At the 2000 census, there were 6,235 people, 2,061 households, and 1,690 families living in the CDP. The population density was 1,130.2 people/km^{2} (2,927 people/mi^{2}). There were 2,252 housing units at an average density of 408.2 units/km^{2} (1,057 units/mi^{2}). The racial makeup of the CDP was 61.54% White, 9.90% African American, 0.22% Native American, 25.04% Asian, 0.05% Pacific Islander, 1.30% from other races, and 1.96% from two or more races. Hispanic or Latino of any race were 5.15% of the population.

There were 2,061 households, of which 52.7% had children under the age of 18 living with them, 68.9% were married couples living together, 10.4% had a female householder with no husband present, and 18.0% were non-families. 14.3% of all households comprised individuals, and 3.3% had someone 65 or older living alone. The average household size was 3.03, and the average family size was 3.36.

31.8% of the population were under 18, 6.0% from 18 to 24, 37.3% from 25 to 44, 19.7% from 45 to 64, and 5.2% who were 65 years of age or older. The median age was 34 years. For every 100 females, there were 93.2 males. For every 100 females age 18 and over, there were 90.2 males.

The median household income was $79,050, and the median family income was $83,024. Males had a median income of $56,892 versus $43,500 for females. The per capita income for the CDP was $28,924. About 1.9% of families and 2.4% of the population were below the poverty line, including 1.5% of those under age 18 and 2.7% of those age 65 or over.

As part of the 2000 Census, 15.72% of Dayton's residents identified themselves as being Indian American. This was the fourth-highest percentage of Indian people in any place in the United States, with 1,000 or more residents identifying as having Indian ancestry.

== Economy ==
Companies headquartered or with an office in Dayton include:

- 2(X)IST: a clothing brand specializing in men's underwear.
- Accutest Laboratories: a provider of environmental analytical services to the consulting community, the petroleum, oil, gas, and chemical industry, and government clients.
- Aurobindo Pharma USA, Inc.: Pharmaceutical Distribution Center.
- Aurolife Pharma LLC: Pharmaceutical Manufacturing Center.
- GMB North America, Inc.
- Haddad Brands: a privately held family business that deals with apparel and accessories.

== Transportation ==
County Route 522 crosses through the community, and U.S. Route 130 travels along the neighborhood's eastern edge. The New Jersey Turnpike, U.S. Route 1, and New Jersey Route 32 are accessible just outside of Dayton.

== Notable people ==
People who were born in, residents of, or otherwise closely associated with Dayton include:

- Ed Moran (born 1981), retired track and road runner who specialized in various long-distance disciplines, was a gold medalist in the 5000-meter race at the 2007 Pan American Games.
- Sydney Schneider (born 1999), goalkeeper for the UNC Wilmington Seahawks and the Jamaica women's national football team.
