= Athletics at the 2019 Summer Universiade – Men's 3000 metres steeplechase =

The men's 3000 metres steeplechase event at the 2019 Summer Universiade was held on 9 and 12 July at the Stadio San Paolo in Naples.

== Medalists ==
Gold	Silver	Bronze
Mounaime Sassioui; Morocco	Rantso Mokopane; South Africa	Ashley Smith; South Africa

== Results ==
=== Heats ===
Qualification: First 5 in each heat (Q) and next 5 fastest (q) qualified for the final.

Rank	Heat	Name	Nationality	Time	Notes
1	1	Ryohei Sakaguchi	Japan	8:49.50	Q
2	1	Ryan Smeeton	Canada	8:50.56	Q
3	2	Jean-Simon Desgagnes	Canada	8:50.83	Q
4	1	Rantso Mokopane	South Africa	8:51.15	Q
5	2	Mounaime Sassioui	Morocco	8:51.36	Q
6	2	Jakob Abrahamsen	Denmark	8:51.54	Q
7	1	Mark Pearce	Great Britain	8:51.69	Q
8	2	Ashley Smith	South Africa	8:52.06	Q
9	2	Max Stevens	Australia	8:52.39	Q
10	2	Turgay Bayram	Turkey	8:53.58	q
11	1	André Pereira	Portugal	8:54.94	Q
12	1	Luca Sinn	Austria	8:57.23	q
13	1	Matthew Clarke	Australia	9:03.13	q
14	1	Simon Grannetia	Netherlands	9:05.73	q
15	2	Ricardo Ferreira	Portugal	9:08.93	q
16	1	Harry Ewing	New Zealand	9:12.88	
17	2	Awet Yohannes	Sweden	9:28.61	
18	1	Carlos Augusto Johnson	Argentina	9:28.77	
19	1	Nikolas Fragkou	Cyprus	9:41.87	
20	2	Klemen Vilhar	Slovenia	9:42.40	
	2	Simone Colombini	Italy	DNF	
	2	Noah Schutte	Netherlands	DNS	

=== Final ===
Official Video

Rank	Name	Nationality	Time	Notes
1st place, gold medalist(s)	Mounaime Sassioui	Morocco	8:30.24	
2nd place, silver medalist(s)	Rantso Mokopane	South Africa	8:30.37	PB
3rd place, bronze medalist(s)	Ashley Smith	South Africa	8:33.60	
4	Jean-Simon Desgagnes	Canada	8:36.20	
5	Ryan Smeeton	Canada	8:40.00	
6	Ryohei Sakaguchi	Japan	8:41.64	
7	Mark Pearce	Great Britain	8:42.63	PB
8	Turgay Bayram	Turkey	8:42.85	PB
9	Jakob Abrahamsen	Denmark	8:43.54	
10	Luca Sinn	Austria	8:43.56	
11	Matthew Clarke	Australia	8:43.91	
12	André Pereira	Portugal	8:47.08	SB
13	Ricardo Ferreira	Portugal	8:57.14	PB
14	Max Stevens	Australia	8:57.40	
15	Simon Grannetia	Netherlands	9:02.36	
