= Athletics at the 2011 Pan American Games – Men's 5,000 metres =

Men's 5,000 metres at the 2011 Pan American Games
- Venue: Telmex Athletics Stadium
- Dates: October 24
- Competitors: 15 from 11 nations

Medalists
| Gold medal | Juan Luis Barrios | Mexico |
| Silver medal | Bayron Piedra | Ecuador |
| Bronze medal | Joílson Silva | Brazil |

The men's 5,000 metres competition of the athletics events at the 2011 Pan American Games took place on the 24 of October at the Telmex Athletics Stadium. The defending Pan American Games champion is Ed Moran of the United States.

== Records ==
Prior to this competition, the existing world and Pan American Games records were as follows:

| World record | Kenenisa Bekele (ETH) | 12:37.35 | Hengelo, Netherlands | May 31, 2004 |
| Pan American Games record | Ed Moran (USA) | 13:25.60 | Rio de Janeiro, Brazil | July 23, 2007 |

== Qualification ==
Each National Olympic Committee (NOC) was able to enter up to two entrants providing they had met the minimum standard (14.20.00) in the qualifying period (January 1, 2010 to September 14, 2011).

== Schedule ==
| Date | Time | Round |
|---|---|---|
| October 25, 2011 | 18:10 | Final |

== Abbreviations ==
- All times shown are in minutes:seconds

| PR | Pan American games record |
| WR | world record |
| NR | national record |
| PB | personal best |
| SB | season best |

== Results ==
15 athletes from 11 countries competed.

=== Final ===
| Rank | Athlete | Country | Time | Notes |
|---|---|---|---|---|
| 1st place, gold medalist(s) | Juan Luis Barrios | Mexico | 14:13.77 | |
| 2nd place, silver medalist(s) | Byron Piedra | Ecuador | 14:15.74 | |
| 3rd place, bronze medalist(s) | Joilson da Silva | Brazil | 14:16.11 | |
| 4 | Juan Carlos Romero | Mexico | 14:16.13 | PB |
| 5 | Brandon Bethke | United States | 14:17.31 | |
| 6 | José Mauricio González | Colombia | 14:19.43 | |
| 7 | Javier Guarín | Colombia | 14:20.15 | |
| 8 | Stephen Furst | United States | 14:21.94 | |
| 9 | Jhon Cusi | Peru | 14:28.31 | |
| 10 | Raul Machahuay | Peru | 14:43.05 | |
| 11 | Miguel Barzola | Argentina | 14:44.23 | |
| 12 | Luis Orta | Venezuela | 14:59.00 | |
| 13 | Jose Raxon | Guatemala | 14:59.78 | |
| 14 | Ubaldo De Los Santos | Uruguay | 15:23.87 | |
| 15 | Oneil Williams | Bahamas | 18:01.55 | |
