= Athletics at the 2023 Pan American Games – Men's 3000 metres steeplechase =

Men's 3,000 metres steeplechase at the 2023 Pan American Games
- Venue: Julio Martínez National Stadium
- Dates: November 4
- Competitors: 13 from 10 nations
- Winning time: 8:30.14

Medalists
Gold medal	Jean-Simon Desgagnés	Canada
Silver medal	Daniel Michalski	United States
Bronze medal	Carlos San Martín	Colombia

The men's 3000 metres steeplechase competition of the athletics events at the 2023 Pan American Games was held on November 4 at the Julio Martínez National Stadium.

== Records ==
Prior to this competition, the existing world and Pan American Games records were as follows:

World record	Saif Shaheen (QAT)	7:53.63	Brussels, Belgium	September 3, 2004
Pan American Games record	Wander Moura (BRA)	8:14.41	Mar del Plata, Argentino	March 22, 1995

== Schedule ==
Date	Time	Round
November 4, 2023	19:35	Final

== Results ==
=== Final ===
The results were as follows:

Rank	Name	Nationality	Time	Notes
1st place, gold medalist(s)	Jean-Simon Desgagnés	Canada	8:30.14	
2nd place, silver medalist(s)	Daniel Michalski	United States	8:36.47	
3rd place, bronze medalist(s)	Carlos San Martín	Colombia	8:41.59	
4	César Gómez	Mexico	8:47.69	
5	Julio Palomino	Peru	8:48.50	SB
6	Matheus da Silva	Brazil	8:57.90	
7	Diddier Rodríguez	Panama	8:58.73	
8	Arturo Reyna	Mexico	9:01.06	
9	Gualberto Molina	Argentina	9:03.03	
10	Jackson Mestler	United States	9:05.18	
11	Mauricio Valdivia	Chile	9:11.27	
12	José Peña	Venezuela	9:17.90	
13	Gleison da Silva	Brazil	9:22.38	
