= Charles Philibert-Thiboutot =

Canadian middle-distance runner (born 1990)

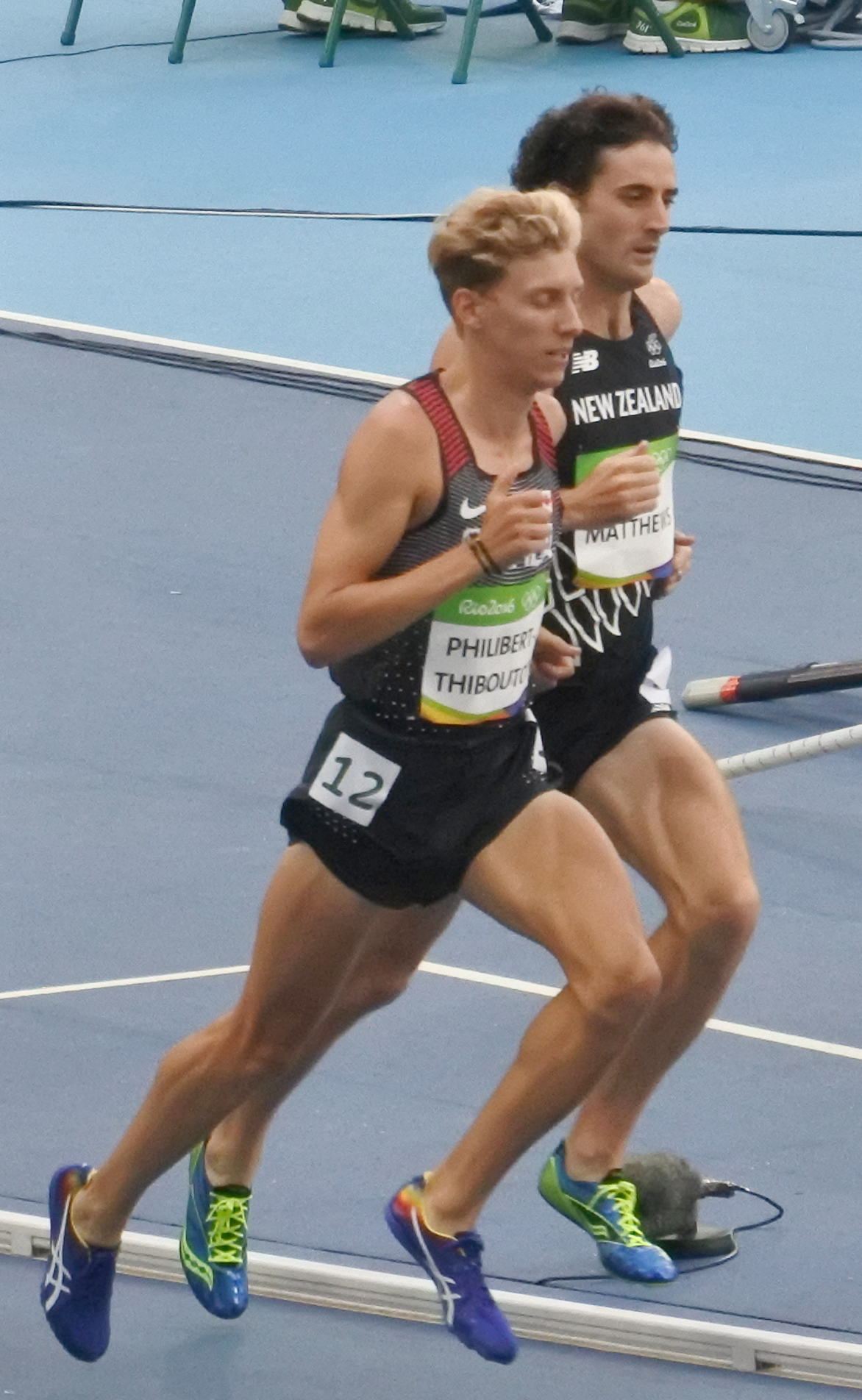
- Philibert-Thiboutot (left) at the 2016 Olympics

Personal information
- Nicknames: CPT, Chuck PT, Charles PT
- Born: 31 December 1990 (age 35) Quebec City, Quebec, Canada
- Education: Laval University
- Employers: Asics (2015-2021); New Balance (2021-present)
- Height: 1.81 m (5 ft 11 in)
- Weight: 62 kg (137 lb)

Sport
- Sport: Track and field
- Events: 1500m, 5000m
- University team: Laval Rouge et Or
- Coached by: Felix-Antoine Lapointe

Achievements and titles
- Personal bests: 1500 metres: 3:32.94 (Tomblaine 2023); Mile: 3:52.97 (Falmouth 2021); 2000 metres: 4:51.54 AR (Brussels 2023); 3000 metres: 7:35.73 (Paris 2024); 5000 metres: 13:12.76 (San Juan Capistrano 2022); Indoor; 1500 metres: 3:36:53 (New York City 2024); Mile: 3:53.12 (New York City 2024); 3000 metres: 7:41.12 (Boston 2023); Road; 5 km: 13:32; marathon: 2:26:25 (New York City 2025)
Medal record
Men's athletics
Representing Canada
NACAC Championships
Silver medal – second place	2025 Freeport	1500 m
Bronze medal – third place	2018 Toronto	1500 m
Bronze medal – third place	2022 Freeport	1500 m
Pan American Games
Gold medal – first place	2023 Santiago	1500 m
Silver medal – second place	2023 Santiago	5000 m
Bronze medal – third place	2015 Toronto	1500 m
NACAC Under-23 Championships
Silver medal – second place	2012 Irapuato	1500 m

Charles Philibert-Thiboutot (French pronunciation: [filibɛʁ tibuto]; born 31 December 1990) is a Canadian middle-distance runner who specializes in the 1500 metres. In his specialty event, he has represented Canada at the 2015, 2022, and 2023 World Championships as well as at the 2016 Olympics, having reached the semi-final on all occasions. He is also the 2023 Pan American Champion over 1500 m, having won a bronze medal in the same event at the 2015 edition.

In 2013 and 2015, Philibert-Thiboutot was selected as Canadian Interuniversity Sport Athlete of the Year.

== University career ==
Graduating high school with personal bests of 1:58 in the 800 m, 4:07 in the 1500 m, and 9:07 in the 3000 m, Philibert-Thiboutot then attended Laval University in his hometown of Quebec City, where he competed for the Laval Rouge et Or cross country and track and field teams coached by Felix-Antoine Lapointe.

=== 2011: Rookie year ===
In 2011, his first year competing for the Rouge et Or, he qualified for the CIS Track and Field Championships in Sherbrooke. At the championship, he contested the 3000 m where he finished 10th in a time of 8:31.54. He also competed as part of Laval's 4 × 800 metres relay team, which finished 6th in 7:46.33.

=== 2012: Quadruple at CIS ===
Competing at the 2012 CIS Track and Field Championships held in Winnipeg, he contested an impressive four events: the 1000 m, 1500 m, the 4 × 400 m, and the 4 x 800 m. Individually, he earned podium finishes in the 1000 m and 1500 m, placing 3rd and 2nd respectively. Competing as part of Laval's 4 × 400 m he finished 7th and on the 4 x 800 m he placed 5th as part of the Rouge et Or foursome.

In June 2012, Philibert-Thiboutot ran a 1500 m personal best of 3:41.75 in Indianapolis and finished 7th at the Canadian Championships in Calgary in 3:51.97.

Later that summer, he made his international debut, representing Canada at the NACAC U23 Championships in Iraputo, Mexico. Competing in the 1500 m, he placed 2nd in a time of 3:52.00 behind the USA's Kyle Merber.

=== 2013: Jeux de la Francophonie ===
In summer 2013, Philibert-Thiboutot placed 5th at the Canadian Championships and ran a personal best of 3:40.57 over 1500 m at the Victoria International Track Classic. That September, he competed at the 2013 Jeux de la Francophonie in Nice. Once again contesting the 1500 m, he placed 7th in a tactical race, running a time of 3:58.50.

Despite being known for his middle-distance prowess, Philibert-Thiboutot earned an impressive bronze medal finish at the 2013 CIS Cross Country Championships, contested over 10 km, leading Laval to a 3rd place team finish.

=== 2014: CIS Champion ===
In 2014, Philibert-Thiboutot earned his first CIS title, winning the 1500 m at the CIS Championships in Edmonton, in a time of 3:48.69. Contesting the 3000 m as well, he placed 2nd and also anchored Laval's 4 x 800 m squad to a 4th place finish.

On May 15, he opened his outdoor season with a personal best of 3:38.55 in Los Angeles, breaking the 3:40 barrier for the first time. One month later, he competed at the American Milers Series in Indianapolis where he ran another personal best of 3:38.33. Two weeks later on June 29, he finished second at the Canadian Championships in Moncton, just 0.35 seconds behind 2-time Olympian Nathan Brannen.

Philibert-Thiboutot represented the Americas at the 2014 IAAF Continental Cup in Marrakesh, Morocco. Contesting the 1500 m, he finished last in a time of 3:51.97.

At the 2014 CIS Cross Country Championships, he replicated his finish from the previous year placing 3rd over a challenging 10 km course in St. John's.

=== 2015: Final year of university competition ===
2015 marked Philibert-Thiboutot's final season of university competition. At the CIS Championships he contested two individual events, winning the 1000 m and placing 2nd in the 3000 m, just two hours after the 1000 m. He had planned to contest the 1500 m as well. However, the next day, he contracted gastroenteritis which confined him to a hospital bed. As part of Laval's 4 x 800 m team, he finished 6th.

== Professional career ==
=== 2015: World Championships debut ===
Philibert-Thiboutot opened his 2015 outdoor season at the Payton Jordan Invitational running 3:42.72 over 1500 m. On June 11, he competed in his first ever Diamond League meeting, contesting the Dream Mile at the Bislett Games in Oslo. He finished 8th in 3:54.52, a 3 second personal best, making him the 4th fastest Canadian of all time over the distance. In July, he competed finished 2nd at the Canadian Championships, replicated his finish from the previous year.

Competing at the Monaco Diamond League, he ran a 4 second 1500 m personal best, clocking a time of 3:34.23, achieving the World Championship and Olympic qualifying standards in the process. The next week, he competed at the Pan Am Gamesin Toronto. He placed 3rd, joining silver medalist and fellow Canadian Nathan Brannen on the podium.

On August 27, Philibert-Thiboutot made his World Championship debut in Beijing. In his heat, he finished 7th in 3:39.72, advancing him through to the semi-finals as a time qualifier. The next day he competed in the semi-finals where he finished 10th in his heat, not enough to qualify him for the world final.

=== 2016: Rio de Janeiro Olympics ===
In 2016, Philibert-Thiboutot signed a five-year extension to his professional contract with Asics, having already been sponsored by the company throughout his university career.

He opened his outdoor season in Los Angeles on May 20, running a time of 3:38.39 over 1500 m. His next race came at the Rome Diamond League, where he finished 11th in a time of 3:36.00. He claimed his first Canadian title in Edmonton on July 9, winning the Olympic trials 1500 m in 3:55.75. The next week, he competed at the Monaco Diamond League, running 3:34.34, his second fastest 1500 m ever.

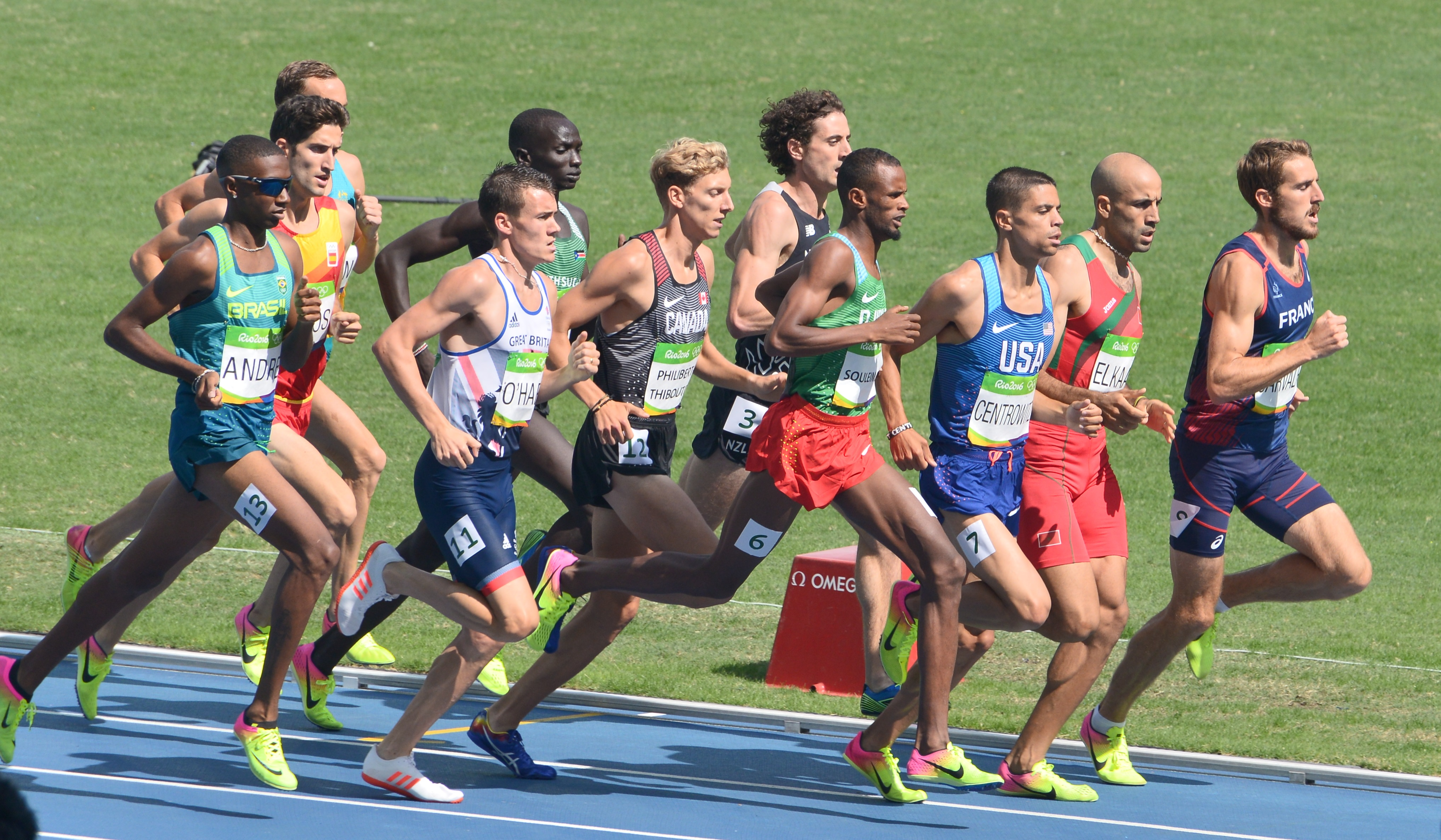
Philibert-Thiboudot (third from right) competing in the semi-finals of the 1500 m at the 2016 Olympic Games

On August 16, Philibert-Thiboutot made his Olympic debut in Rio de Janeiro. He made it through the first round, qualifying through to the semi-finals on time with a mark of 3:40.04. Two days later, he contested the semi-final, but in a repeat of the 2015 World Championships, he was unable to advance to the final.

The final two races of his 2016 campaign were both road races. On September 3, he finished fifth at the Fifth Avenue Mile in 3:52.5, and took first place at the Canadian 5 km Championships in 14:04 on September 11.

=== 2017: Missing the World Championships ===
Philibert-Thiboutot opened his 2017 indoor season on January 28, running a 3000 m personal best of 7:46.22 in Seattle. On February 11, he became the first Quebecker to break the 4-minute barrier in the mile indoors, running 3:55.33 for 4th place in the Wanamaker Mile.

Despite suffering from achilles tendon issues, he defended his Canadian title in Ottawa, running a time of 3:45.32 in the process.

On July 12, he ran his season's best 1500 m of 3:37.91 in Saint-Therese, Quebec, but missed the qualifying standard for the 2017 World Championships. In his last attempt to hit the standard on July 22, just one day before the qualifying window closed, he ran 3:39.34 in Belgium, missing the mark by 3.94 seconds. Without the standard, he missed out on the 2017 World Championships in London.

=== 2018: NACAC bronze ===
Heading into 2018, Philibert-Thiboutot still suffered from persistent achilles tendon issues, but was able to open his outdoor season with a 3:37.73 1500 m in Prague on June 4. At the Canadian Championships in July, he again defended his national title, running a time of 3:46.19.

Later that summer, he competed at the NACAC Championships in Toronto, winning bronze as part of the home team. He also represented the Americas at what would be the final edition of the IAAF Continental Cup, placing 4th in a time of 3:40.90

=== 2019–2020: Injury ===
Due to a stress fracture in his foot, Philibert-Thiboutot only raced once in 2019, a 13:30.79 5000 m at Boston University on December 7.

In 2020, he raced sparingly once again due to both the ongoing pandemic and a tear in his calf muscle. Contesting just four races later in the year, he ran a 14:04 road 5 km and 31:25 road 10 km in Quebec. On November 21, he made his debut over the 10,000 m on the track, running a time of 28:45. On December 4, he competed over 5000 m in California, running an 8 second personal best of 13:22.44.

=== 2021: Missing the Tokyo Olympics ===
In February 2021, Philibert-Thiboutot announced that he had switched sponsors, ending his previous contract with Asics and signing with New Balance.

On 27 June, he won the Canadian Olympic trials 1500 m in a time of 3:40.11, but without the Olympic standard, his fastest time so far having come from 3:36.44 performance in Montreuil, and not having a sufficiently high world ranking, he did not qualify for the Olympics in Tokyo.

Despite not qualifying, he finished his season on a high note, with a 3:34.43 1500 m season's best in Azusa, California, a win over the mile in Falmouth, Massachusetts in a personal best of 3:52.97, and running 3:54.0 for 9th in the Fifth Avenue Mile.

=== 2022: Return to the World Championships ===
2022 marked a significant return to form for Philibert-Thiboutot, opening his season with a win at the B.A.A. 5K in 13:35, breaking Paul Williams' Canadian road 5 km record 13:36 set in 1986. On 6 May, Philibert-Thiboutot followed this win with a 5000 m personal best of 13:12.76 in San Juan Capistrano. On 14 May, he set a 10,000 m personal best of 28:11.81 to take 2nd at the Canadian 10,000 Championships in Burnaby.

Off the back of his strong performances in late 2021, as well as a 3:53.82 mile at the Pre Classic and a 3:35.80 1500 m performance at the Portland Track Festival, Philibert-Thiboutot earned enough ranking points to qualify for his first World Championships since 2015.

After a win over 5000 m at the Canadian Championships in 13:31.98, he also qualified for the World Championships in the 5000 m.

At the championship, taking place in Eugene, Oregon, he contested both the 1500 m and 5000 m. His first race of the championships was the 1500 m heats on 16 July, where he ran a season's best of 3:35.02 to finish second in his heat, advancing him to the semi-finals, taking place the following day. He ran well in his semi-final, taking 7th place, but outside of the top 5 needed to secure a place in the finals. After being eliminated from the 1500 m, Philibert-Thiboutot shifted focus to the 5000 m heats taking place on 21 July. He finished 15th in his heat, 14 seconds back of a top 6 placing that would have advanced him to the final.

Later that summer, he competed in the 1500 m at the NACAC Championships in Freeport. He won a bronze medal behind Americans Johnny Gregorek and Eric Holt, repeating his performance from the 2018 edition of the event.

=== 2023: Pan Am Games Gold ===
Philibert-Thiboutot opened his 2023 season on 27 January with an indoor 1500 m in Spokane, running 3:42.81. The next month, on 26 February, he ran 3:55.28 for the mile at Boston University, a personal best of 0.05 seconds.

Entering the 2023 outdoor season, he set his sights on achieving the Olympic 1500 m standard of 3:33.50 to qualify for the 2024 Olympics. On 10 June in Montesson, France, he came 0.04 seconds away from hitting this mark, running 3:33.54, still good for his first 1500 m personal best since 2015. On 18 June, in Tomblaine, France, he hit the Olympic standard, running 3:32.94, his second personal best in just nine days. The next month at the Silesia Diamond League in Poland, he ran under the Olympic standard once again, finishing 12th in 3:33.29. These performances also hit the world championships standard of 3:34.20 and qualified him for the 2023 World Athletics Championships in Budapest, Hungary.

Going into the 2023 Canadian Track and Field Championships, Philibert-Thiboutot was the favourite, having run 2.5 seconds faster than anyone else in the field. Reflecting this, he led most of the race and was able to successfully drop most of the field, with the exception of Kieran Lumb. As the two men rounded the final bend, Lumb took the lead and won the race in a championship record of 3:37.24, while Philibert-Thiboutot finished close behind in 3:38.01.

In the first round of the World Championships, he placed 6th in his heat in 3:34.60, advancing him to the semi-finals. However, as on several occasions before, he was unable to advance to the finals after finishing 10th in his semi-final.

On 8 September, he competed in the Brussels Diamond League, competing in the rarely-contested 2000 metres. He ran a time of 4:51.54, a Canadian and North American record.

Despite it coming during the fall season, typically reserved for base-training where top-endurance athletes are often not at their sharpest, Philibert-Thiboutot competed in the 2023 Pan Am Games in Santiago, Chile, in both the 1500 m and 5000 m. On 31 October he competed in the 5000 m. From the gun, the pace was slow through the first 10 minutes of the race, with Philibert-Thiboutot sitting in third place. With two laps to go, the pace increased, and he had to hold off athletes attempting to move around him. He ultimately closed the race in 54 seconds to finish as the third runner across the line. However, after the disqualification of Mexican Fernando Martínez, Philibert-Thiboutot claimed the silver medal behind American Kasey Knevelbaard.

Just a few days later, Philibert-Thiboutot contested his stronger event, the 1500 m. Boxed in with just 100 m to go, he was able to move past three athletes in the final sprint. At the finish line, he dove, moving past fellow Canadian Robert Heppenstall, who had already raised his fist in celebration, thinking he had won gold. Ultimately, it was Philibert-Thiboutot who prevailed, taking gold in 3:39.74 and leading himself and Heppenstall to a 1-2 Canadian finish.

Philibert-Thiboutot's final race of the calendar year came at the Canadian Cross Cross Country Championships on 25 November. He finished 7th over the 10 km course in Ottawa, earning the team title alongside his training partners from the Club D'athlétisme de 'Université Laval.

=== 2024: Paris Olympics ===
Philibert-Thiboutot's 2024 season opener came on 26 January, contesting the mile at the Boston University John Thomas Terrier Classic. After the pacer dropped off, he led most of the race and held a gap on the field with 200 metres to go. However, on the back stretch, NAU sophomore Colin Sahlman started to reel him in, and, with 50 metres to go, passed Philibert-Thiboutot. Philibert-Thiboutot held on to take second in 3:53.41, a personal best and under the World Indoor Championships qualifying standard of 3:53.50 for the mile.

The next week, he competed at the New Balance Indoor Grand Prix, running the 3000 m, aiming to break Kieran Lumb's Canadian indoor record of 7:38.39. He came close, but ultimately finished in 7:41.12, still a personal best. In his third straight week of racing, he competed in the prestigious Wanamaker Mile at the Millrose Games. Following the fast pace set out by the leading runners, Philibert-Thiboutot split 1:53.80 through halfway in 6th place, a pace that, if held, would have resulted in a 3:47.60 mile. However, his pace faded over the last half of the race, and he ran 59.47 and 59.86 for the last two quarter miles, still finishing with a personal best of 3:53.12.

To cap off his 2024 indoor season, he competed in the 1500 m at the World Indoor Championships in Glasgow. He ran 3:40.18 to place 5th in his heat, not high enough to qualify for the final.

=== 2025: Retirement ===
Philibert-Thiboutot started his 2025 outdoor season by competing in the 3000m and the 5000m at the Kingston Grand Slam Track inaugural meet. In August, he got the silver medal in the 1500m at the NACAC Championships in Freeport, Bahamas finishing behind his fellow Canadian Foster Malleck. The next month we went to Tokyo Japan to compete in the World Athletics Championships where he didn't make it out of heats of the 1500m. He finished his season, and career, by making his marathon debut at the New York city marathon finishing 21st in the elite field with a time of 2:26:25. During the race he got through halfway with the lead pack before he started cramping causing him to slow. The marathon would be his last race before retirement from professional running.

== Competition record ==
=== International competitions ===
Year	Competition	Venue	Position	Event	Notes
Representing Canada and the Americas (Continental Cup)
2012	NACAC U23 Championships	Irapuato, Mexico	2nd	1500 m	3:52.00
2013	Jeux de la Francophonie	Nice, France	7th	1500 m	3:58.50
2014	Continental Cup	Marrakesh, Morocco	8th	1500 m	3:51.97^{1}
2015	Pan American Games	Toronto, Canada	3rd	1500 m	3:41.79
2015	World Championships	Beijing, China	10th (sf)	1500 m	3:39.62
2016	Olympic Games	Rio de Janeiro, Brazil	16th (sf)	1500 m	3:40.79
2018	NACAC Championships	Toronto, Canada	3rd	1500 m	3:52.60
2018	Continental Cup	Ostrava, Czech Republic	4th	1500 m	3:40.90
2022	World Championships	Eugene, United States	15th (sf)	1500 m	3:37.29
2022	World Championships	Eugene, United States	27th (h)	5000 m	13:38.80
2022	NACAC Championships	Freeport, Bahamas	3rd	1500 m	3:37.91
2023	World Championships	Budapest, Hungary	24th (sf)	1500 m	3:37.41
2023	Pan American Games	Santiago, Chile	1st	1500 m	3:39.74
2023	Pan American Games	Santiago, Chile	2nd	5000 m	14:48.02
2024	World Indoor Championships	Glasgow, United Kingdom	9th (h)	1500 m	3:40.18
2024	Olympic Games	Paris, France	17th (sf)	1500 m	3:33.29
2025	NACAC Championships	Freeport, Bahamas	2nd	1500 m	3:40.57
2025	World Championships	Tokyo, Japan	49th (h)	1500 m	3:44.82

=== National championships ===
Year	Competition	Venue	Position	Event	Time
2011	Canadian Championships	Calgary, Alberta	12th	1500 m	3:56.23
2012	Canadian Championships	Calgary, Alberta	26th (h)	800 m	1:54.21
2012	Canadian Championships	Calgary, Alberta	7th	1500 m	3:51.97
2013	Canadian Championships	Moncton, New Brunswick	5th	1500 m	3:52.94
2014	Canadian Championships	Moncton, New Brunswick	2nd	1500 m	3:42.85
2015	Canadian Indoor Championships	Montreal, Quebec	4th	600 m	1:20.03
2015	Canadian Championships	Edmonton, Alberta	2nd	1500 m	4:06.58
2016	Canadian Olympic trials	Edmonton, Alberta	1st	1500 m	3:55.75
2016	Canadian 5 km Road Championships	Toronto, Ontario	1st	5 km	14:04
2017	Canadian Championships	Ottawa, Ontario	1st	1500 m	3:45.37
2018	Canadian Championships	Ottawa, Ontario	1st	1500 m	3:46.19
2021	Canadian Olympic trials	Montreal, Quebec	1st	1500 m	3:40.78
2021	Canadian Cross Country Championships	Ottawa, Ontario	2nd	10 km	31:42
2022	Canadian 10,000 m Championships	Burnaby, British Colombia	2nd	10,000 m	28:11.81
2022	Canadian Championships	Langley, British Columbia	1st	5000 m	13:31.98
2023	Canadian Championships	Langley, British Columbia	2nd	1500 m	3:38.01
2023	Canadian Cross Country Championships	Ottawa, Ontario	7th	10 km	29:42
2024	Canadian Championships	Montreal, Quebec	2nd	1500 m	3:45.29

=== Canadian university championships (CIS) ===
Year	Competition	Venue	Position	Event	Time
Representing the Laval Rouge et Or
2010	CIS Cross Country Championships	Sherbrooke, Quebec	61st	10 km	34:58
2011	CIS Track and Field Championships	Sherbrooke, Quebec	10th	3000 m	8:31.54
2011	CIS Track and Field Championships	Sherbrooke, Quebec	6th	4 × 800 m relay	7:46.33
2011	CIS Cross Country Championships	Laval, Quebec	49th	10 km	34:17
2012	CIS Track and Field Championships	Winnipeg, Manitoba	3rd	1000 m	2:22.74
2012	CIS Track and Field Championships	Winnipeg, Manitoba	2nd	1500 m	3:48.07
2012	CIS Track and Field Championships	Winnipeg, Manitoba	7th	4 × 400 m relay	3:19.66
2012	CIS Track and Field Championships	Winnipeg, Manitoba	5th	4 × 800 m relay	7:35.82
2012	CIS Cross Country Championships	London, Ontario	14th	10 km	32:17
2013	CIS Cross Country Championships	London, Ontario	3rd	10 km	31:01
2014	CIS Track and Field Championships	Edmonton, Alberta	1st	1500 m	3:48.69
2014	CIS Track and Field Championships	Edmonton, Alberta	2nd	3000 m	8:16.26
2014	CIS Track and Field Championships	Edmonton, Alberta	4th	4 × 800 m relay	7:37.82
2014	CIS Cross Country Championships	St. John's, Newfoundland and Labrador	3rd	10 km	34:04
2015	CIS Track and Field Championships	Windsor, Ontario	1st	1000 m	2:25.19
2015	CIS Track and Field Championships	Windsor, Ontario	2nd	3000 m	8:07.04
2015	CIS Track and Field Championships	Windsor, Ontario	6th	4 × 800 m relay	7:40.23

== Personal bests ==
Outdoor

- 400 metres – 50.64 (Québec, 2013)
- 800 metres – 1:47.57 (Indianapolis, 2014)
- 1000 metres – 2:18.38 QR (Montréal, 2021)
- 1500 metres – 3:32.94 QR (Tomblaine, 2023)
- Mile – 3:52.97 QR (Falmouth, MA, 2021)
- 2000 metres – 4:51.54 AR (Bruxelles, 2023)
- 3000 metres – 7:35.73 (Paris, 2024)
- 5000 metres – 13:12.76 QR (San Juan Capistrano, 2022)
- 10,000 metres – 28:06 NR (Ottawa, 2025)

Indoor

- 600 metres – 1:19.98 (Sherbrooke, 2015)
- 1000 metres – 2:21.02 QR (Montreal, 2015)
- 1500 metres – 3:38.79 QR (Boston, 2023)
- Mile – 3:53.12 QR (New York, 2024)
- 3000 metres – 7:41.12 QR (Boston, 2024)
- 5000 metres – 13:30:79 QR (Boston, 2019)
- 4 × 400 metres relay – 3:19.66 (Winnipeg, 2012)
- 4 × 800 metres relay – 7:35.00 QR (New York, 2014)

Road

- Mile – 3:52.5h (New York, 2016) (not legal)
- 5 km – 13:32 QR (Boston, 2023)
- 10 km – 29:45 (Mission, 2021)
- Half marathon – 1:09:15 (Toronto, 2018)

QR = Québec record
