= Athletics at the 2015 Pan American Games – Men's 5000 metres =

Men's 5,000 metres at the 2015 Pan American Games
- Venue: CIBC Pan Am and Parapan Am Athletics Stadium
- Dates: July 25
- Competitors: 16 from 10 nations
- Winning time: 13:46.47

Medalists
Gold medal	Juan Luis Barrios	Mexico
Silver medal	David Torrence	United States
Bronze medal	Víctor Aravena	Chile

The men's 5000 metres sprint competition of the athletics events at the 2015 Pan American Games took place on July 25 at the CIBC Pan Am and Parapan Am Athletics Stadium in Toronto, Canada. The defending Pan American Games champion is Juan Luis Barrios of Mexico.

== Records ==
Prior to this competition, the existing world and Pan American Games records were as follows:

World record	Kenenisa Bekele (ETH)	12:37.35	Hengelo, Netherlands	May 31, 2004
Pan American Games record	Ed Moran (USA)	13:25.60	Rio de Janeiro, Brazil	July 23, 2007

== Qualification ==
Each National Olympic Committee (NOC) was able to enter up to two entrants providing they had met the minimum standard (14.23.00) in the qualifying period (January 1, 2014 to June 28, 2015).

== Schedule ==
Date	Time	Round
July 25, 2015	20:50	Final

== Results ==
All times shown are in seconds.

KEY:	q	Fastest non-qualifiers	Q	Qualified	NR	National record	PB	Personal best	SB	Seasonal best	DQ	Disqualified

=== Final ===
Rank	Name	Nationality	Time	Notes
1st place, gold medalist(s)	Juan Luis Barrios	Mexico	13:46.47	
2nd place, silver medalist(s)	David Torrence	United States	13:46.60	
3rd place, bronze medalist(s)	Víctor Aravena	Chile	13:46.94	PB
4	Garrett Heath	United States	13:47.17	
5	Cameron Levins	Canada	13:48.03	
6	Altobeli da Silva	Brazil	13:49.00	
7	José Juan Esparza	Mexico	13:51.50	
8	Lucas Bruchet	Canada	13:56.09	
9	Carlos Díaz	Chile	13:59.66	
10	Bayron Piedra	Ecuador	14:04.20	
11	Mario Pacay	Guatemala	14:07.87	
12	David de Macedo	Brazil	14:08.56	
13	Joseph Cesar Rosa	Puerto Rico	14:29.78	
14	Jose Mauricio Gonzalez	Colombia	16:13.05	
	Federico Bruno	Argentina	DNF	
	James Cesar Rosa	Puerto Rico	DNS	
