= Carlos San Martín =

Colombian runner (born 1993)

Personal information
- Full name: Carlos Andres San Martín
- Born: 19 November 1993 (age 32)
- Height: 180 m (590 ft)
- Weight: 60 kg (132 lb)

Sport
- Country: Colombia
- Sport: Athletics
- Events: 1500 metres; 3000 metres; 5000 metres; 10,000 metres; 3000 metres steeplechase

Achievements and titles
- Personal bests: 1,500 m: 3:41.99 (2023); 3,000 m: 8:19.89 (2023); 5,000 m: 13:27.11 (2025); 10,000 m: 28:17.47 (2025); 3,000 m st.: 8:25.66 NR (2021)
Medal record
Representing Colombia
Men's athletics
Event	1st	2nd	3rd
Pan American Games	0	1	1
Pan American Championships	0	1	0
CAC Games	1	0	2
South American Games	0	1	1
South American Championships	3	2	1
Bolivarian Games	3	0	0
Total	7	5	5
Pan American Games
Silver medal – second place	2019 Lima	3000 m st.
Bronze medal – third place	2023 Santiago	3000 m st.
Pan American Championships
Silver medal – second place	2026 Medellín	5000 m
Central American and Caribbean Games
Gold medal – first place	2023 San Salvador	3000 m st.
Bronze medal – third place	2018 Barranquilla	1500 m
Bronze medal – third place	2023 San Salvador	5000 m
South American Games
Silver medal – second place	2022 Asunción	3000 m st.
Bronze medal – third place	2026 Santa Fe	3000 m st.
South American Championships
Gold medal – first place	2019 Lima	3000 m st.
Gold medal – first place	2025 Mar del Plata	5000 m
Gold medal – first place	2025 Mar del Plata	3000 m st.
Silver medal – second place	2021 Guayaquil	3000 m st.
Silver medal – second place	2023 São Paulo	3000 m st.
Bronze medal – third place	2017 Asunción	1500 m
Bolivarian Games
Gold medal – first place	2022 Valledupar	1500 m
Gold medal – first place	2022 Valledupar	3000 m st.
Gold medal – first place	2025 Lima-Ayacucho	3000 m st.

Carlos Andres San Martín (born 19 November 1993) is a Colombian track and field athlete who competes as a steeplechaser and mid-distance runner.

== Career ==
San Martín competed in the 3000 metres steeplechase at the 2019 World Athletics Championships in Doha, running 8:35.10. He also competed at the 2019 Pan American Games in Lima, Peru running a time of 8:32.34 to claim the silver medal in the Men's 3000 metres steeplechase behind Altobeli da Silva of Brazil.

He won the 3000 m steeplechase at the 2019 South American Championships in Athletics, and was runner up in 2021. Prior to that he won bronze in the 1500 m in 2017.

San Martín competed in the 3000 metres steeplechase at the 2020 Summer Olympics, where he ran 8:33.47 to finish twelfth in heat one.

In September 2025, he competed in the 3000 metres steeplechase at the 2025 World Championships in Tokyo, Japan.

== International competitions ==
Year	Competition	Venue	Position	Event	Result
Representing Colombia
2017	South American Championships	Asunción, Paraguay	3rd	1500 m	3:49.99
2017	South American Championships	Asunción, Paraguay	—N/a	5000 m	DNF
2017	Bolivarian Games	Santa Marta, Colombia	5th	5000 m	14:13.08
2018	Central American and Caribbean Games	Barranquilla, Colombia	3rd	1500 m	3:56.78
2018	Ibero-American Championships	Trujillo, Peru	10th	1500 m	3:55.50
2018	Ibero-American Championships	Trujillo, Peru	8th	3000 m	8:32.65
2019	South American Championships	Lima, Peru	6th	1500 m	3:56.84
2019	South American Championships	Lima, Peru	1st	3000 m s'chase	8:36.37
2019	Pan American Games	Lima, Peru	2nd	3000 m s'chase	8:32.24
2019	World Championships	Doha, Qatar	33rd (h)	3000 m s'chase	8:35.10
2021	South American Championships	Guayaquil, Ecuador	6th	1500 m	3:44.44
2021	South American Championships	Guayaquil, Ecuador	2nd	3000 m s'chase	8:34.32
2021	Olympic Games	Tokyo, Japan	35th (h)	3000 m s'chase	8:33.47
2022	Ibero-American Championships	La Nucia, Spain	7th	3000 m s'chase	8:47.27
2022	Bolivarian Games	Valledupar, Colombia	1st	1500 m	3:42.91 GR
2022	Bolivarian Games	Valledupar, Colombia	1st	3000 m s'chase	8:44.62
2022	World Championships	Eugene, Oregon, United States	39th (h)	3000 m s'chase	8:48.66
2022	South American Games	Asunción, Paraguay	10th	1500 m	3:54.63
2022	South American Games	Asunción, Paraguay	2nd	3000 m s'chase	8:52.46
2023	Central American and Caribbean Games	San Salvador, El Salvador	3rd	5000 m	14:14.08
2023	Central American and Caribbean Games	San Salvador, El Salvador	1st	3000 m s'chase	8:50.15
2023	South American Championships	São Paulo, Brazil	—N/a	5000 m	DNF
2023	South American Championships	São Paulo, Brazil	2nd	3000 m s'chase	8:39.23
2023	Pan American Games	Santiago, Chile	3rd	3000 m s'chase	8:41.59
2024	Ibero-American Championships	Cuiabá, Brazil	5th	3000 m s'chase	8:45.41
2025	South American Championships	Mar del Plata, Argentina	1st	5000 m	13:54.34
2025	South American Championships	Mar del Plata, Argentina	1st	3000 m s'chase	8:37.79
2025	World Championships	Tokyo, Japan	34th (h)	3000 m s'chase	9:02.20
2025	Bolivarian Games	Lima, Peru	1st	3000 m s'chase	8:38.27
2026	Ibero-American Championships	Lima, Peru	12th	5000 m	14:39.91
2026	Pan American Championships	Medellín, Colombia	2nd	5000 m	14:46.00
2026	Central American and Caribbean Games	Santo Domingo, Dominican Republic	7th	5000 m	14:39.29
2026	Central American and Caribbean Games	Santo Domingo, Dominican Republic	4th	3000 m s'chase	8:39.95
2026	South American Games	Santa Fe, Argentina	—N/a	5000 m	DNF
2026	South American Games	Santa Fe, Argentina	3rd	3000 m s'chase	8:33.01
