= Casey Comber =

American middle-distance runner

Personal information
- Nationality: United States
- Born: November 4, 1996 (age 29) Horsham, Pennsylvania, U.S.
- Home town: Maple Glen, Pennsylvania

Sport
- Sport: Athletics
- Event: 1500m
- College team: Villanova
- Club: UA Mission Run Baltimore Distance

Achievements and titles
- Personal bests: 1500m: 3:34.24 (Nice, 2023); One Mile: 3:56.33 (Dublin, 2023); One Mile (road): 4:02.88 (Des Moines, 2023)
Medal record
Men's athletics
Representing United States
Pan American Games
Bronze medal – third place	2023 Santiago	1500m

Casey Comber (born November 4, 1996) is an American middle distance runner who competes for Under Armour.

== Early life ==
Comber attended Hatboro-Horsham Senior High School in Pennsylvania before studying Finance at Villanova University.

== Career ==
While competing for the Villanova, he notably finished second in the mile at the 2019 NCAA Division I Indoor Track and Field Championships.

In April 2023, Comber finished runner-up to Hobbs Kessler at the BAA Invitational mile in Boston, Massachusetts. That same month, Comber finished runner-up at the USATF One Mile Championship. In June 2023, Comber ran a personal best time of 3:34.24 for the 1500m at the Meeting Nikaia in Nice, France. In November 2023, Comber won the bronze medal at the 2023 Pan American Games in Santiago, Chile over 1500 metres.

In 2024, and 2025, Comber won the B.A.A. Invitational Mile Road Race in Boston, Massachusetts, finishing ahead of Canadian Aaron Ahl in both races. In February 2025, Comber acted as a pacemaker as Grant Fisher set a new 3000 metres indoors world record at the Millrose Games in New York City.

== Results and personal records ==
All statistics taken from World Athletics Profile

=== Championship results ===
Year	Meet	Venue	Event	Place	Time
2023	USATF National Championships	Hayward Field	1500m	H2 8th	3:44.36
2023	Pan American Games	Julio Martínez National Stadium	1500m	3rd	3:39.90
2022	US Indoor Championships	The Podium	1500m	10th	3:45.17
2021	NCAA Outdoor Championships	Hayward Field	1500m	SF2 7th	3:40.98
2021	U.S. Olympic Trials	Hayward Field	1500m	H1 8th	3:46.25
2019	NCAA Indoor Championships	Birmingham CrossPlex	Mile	2nd	4:08.03
2019	NCAA Outdoor Championships	Mike A. Myers Stadium	1500m	8th	3:42.77
2018	NCAA Indoor Championships	Gilliam Indoor Track Stadium	DMR	8th	9:35.49

=== Personal records ===
Surface	Event	Time	Date	Venue
Short track	One mile	3:51.92	February 11, 2024	The Armory
Short track	3000m	7:43.53	January 28, 2023	The Armory
Short track	5000m	13:55.51	December 3, 2022	Boston University
Outdoor track	1500m	3:34.24	June 17, 2023	Nice, FR
Outdoor track	One mile	3:56.33	July 14, 2023	Morton Stadium
Outdoor track	5000m	13:31.85	May 26, 2023	Drake Stadium
Road	Mile	3:51.15*	July 31, 2021	Cleveland, OH

*Not Legal
