= Jean-Simon Desgagnés =

Canadian steeplechaser (born 1998)

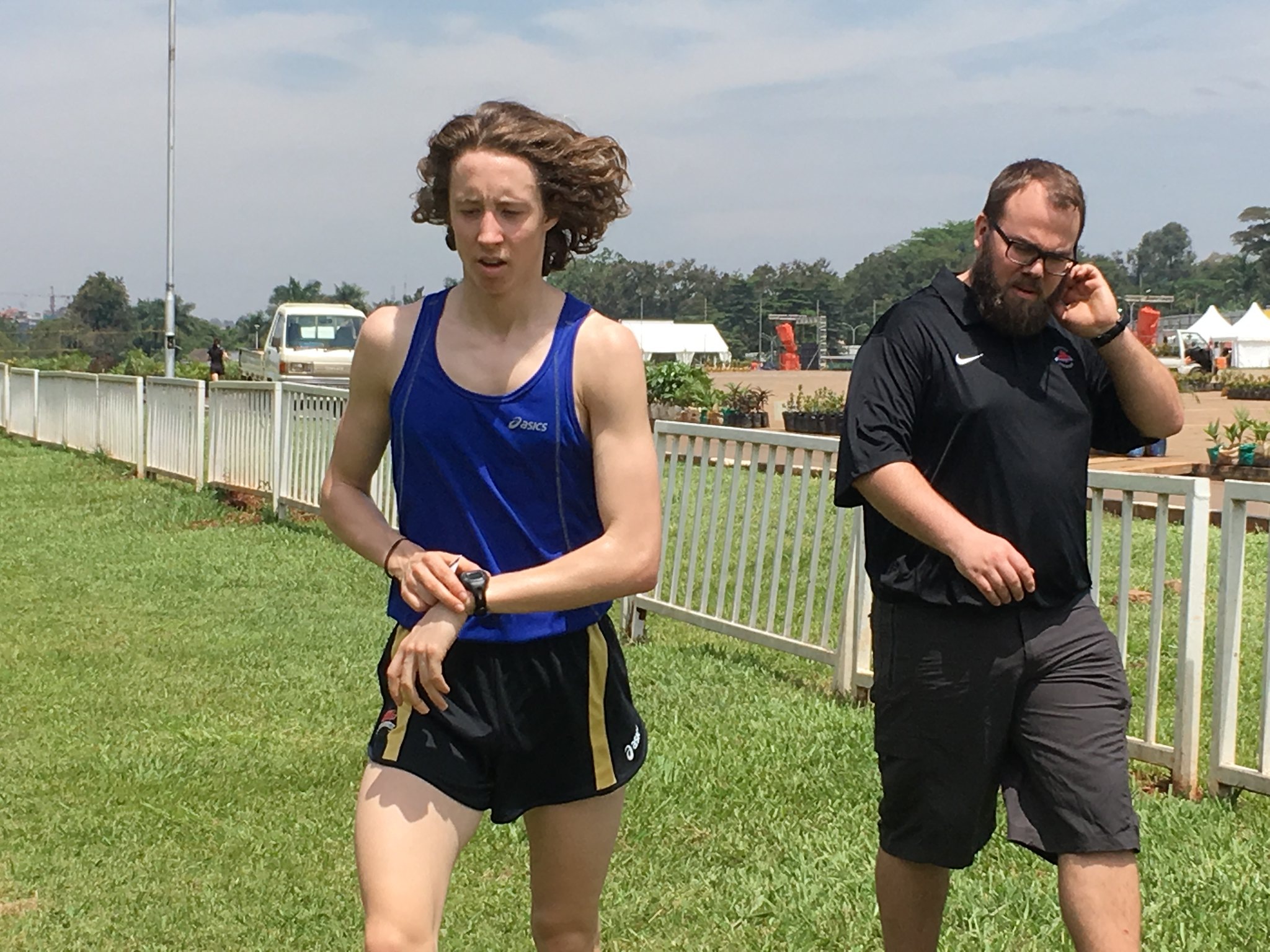
- Desgagnés at the 2017 IAAF World Cross Country Championships

Personal information
- Nickname: JSD
- Born: 26 July 1998 (age 28) Québec City, Québec, Canada
- Education: Laval University
- Height: 5 ft 11 in (180 cm)

Sport
- Sport: Athletics
- Event: 3000 metres steeplechase
- University team: Laval Rouge et Or

Achievements and titles
- Personal bests: 3000m: 7:47.39 (Boston, 2024); 3000 metres steeplechase: 8:13.11 (Paris, 2024)
Medal record
Men's athletics
Representing Canada
Pan Am Games
Gold medal – first place	2023 Santiago	3000 m st.
NACAC Championships
Bronze medal – third place	2022 Freeport	3000 m st.
Pan Am U20 Championships
Gold medal – first place	2017 Trujilo	3000 m st.

Jean-Simon Desgagnés (born 26 July 1998) is a Canadian track and field athlete who specializes in the 3000 metres steeplechase. He has represented Canada at the 2022 and 2023 World Athletics Championships and won gold at the 2023 Pan Am Games. He represented Canada at the 2024 Olympic Games in Paris.

== Running career ==
=== 2017 ===
Desgagnés made his international debut for Canada competing in the U20 race at the 2017 IAAF World Cross Country Championships in Kampala, Uganda. He placed 65th.

In June, he ran a 3000 metres steeplechase personal best of 8:49.83 at the Portland Track Festival. The following month he won the Canadian U20 in the steeple and took gold at the Pan American U20 Championships in the same event. He capped off his season with a first-place finish at the 2017 Canada Summer Games.

=== 2018 ===
In March 2018, Jean-Simon competed at his first USPORTS Track and Field Championships representing the Laval Rouge et Or. Contesting the 1500 m and 3000 m, he placed 7th in 3:58.03 and 9th in 8:32.03.

In June, he improved his 3000 m steeplechase personal best by 10 seconds, running 8:39.03 in Portland, Oregon. On July 1, he placed second at the Canadian Championships in Ottawa.

=== 2019 ===
Following a double gold performance 1500 m and 3000 m at the RSEQ Championships in February, he headed to the 2019 USPORTS Championships in Winnipeg. Desgagnés would finish runner-up in both the 1500 m on March 9 and 3000 m on March 8, losing to Western's Jack Sheffar in both events. He also anchored Laval's 4 x 800 m relay team, placing 13th.

Outdoors, he once again improved he steeplechase by another 10 seconds, running 8:29.10 at the Stanford Invitational. In July, he won a bronze medal in the steeplechase at the 2019 Summer Universade and placed fourth at the Canadian Championships in Montreal.

=== 2020 ===
At the 2020 RSEQ Championships, Desgagnés defended his 1500 m and 3000 m conference titles. At the USPORTS Championships in Edmonton, he once again finished runner-up in the 1500 m, but claimed his first USPORTS individual titles, winning gold in the 3000 m in 8:13.97.

In August, Desgagnés set a 5 km road personal best of 13:59 in Quebec City, missing the Quebec provincial record by just 3 seconds.

=== 2021 ===
On May 21, 2021, Jean-Simon opened his season with a 8:29.41 steeple PB to win the Trials of Miles in New York City. The following week, he ran a personal best of 8:24.40 in Portland.

=== 2022 ===
In January 2022, JSD broke 4-minutes in the mile for the first time, running 3:58.60 at Boston University. At the USPORTS Championships in March, he won the 1500 m title, he also contested the 1000 m, placing seventh and the 3000 m, placing second

Outdoors, Desgagnés opened his season with a steeplechase personal best of 8:22.95 in New York City. At the Canadian Championships in Langley, British Columbia, he placed third behind John Gay and Ryan Smeeton. Alongside Gay and Smeeton, he was selected to represent Canada at the 2022 World Championships in Eugene, Oregon. In his world championship debut, he placed 12th in his heat, missing the final.

Competing at the 2022 NACAC Championships, Desgagnés took a bronze medal in the steeplechase in 8:33.25, behind Evan Jager and Duncan Hamilton, both of the United States.

=== 2023 ===
He set a new personal best 3000 m steeplechase time of 8:20.68 in May 2023, at the Sound Running Track Festival in Walnut, California.

In July, he improved his steeple PB further with a mark of 8:17.40 in Székesfehérvár, Hungary. That month he also won his first senior national championship, in the 3000m steeplechase in Langley, British Columbia. He competed in the 3000 metres steeplechase at the 2023 World Athletics Championships in Budapest in August 2023, where he qualified for the final. In the final he finished eighth in a personal best time of 8:15.58.

In November, Jean-Simon competed at the Pan Am Games in Santiago, Chile. Despite falling on the last water jump, he had enough of a lead to take gold in 8:30.14, beating the second-place finisher, American athlete Daniel Michalski, by over 6 seconds.

=== 2024 ===
In February, Jean-Simon ran a 3000 m personal best of 7:47.39 in Boston. Later that month, he captured both the RSEQ 1500 m and 3000 m titles. Competing in his final USPORTS Championships representing Laval, Desgagnés contested both the 1500 m and 3000 m. With 400 m to go, Desgagnés led, followed by Matthew Beaudet of McGill, however with a final 400 m of under just under 60 seconds, Desgagnés held on to take the win in 7:59.72. In the 1500 m, he placed second, just 0.76 seconds behind Max Davies of Guelph.

At the 2024 Meeting de Paris, he ran 8:13.11 to move to fifth on the Canadian all-time list for the 3000 metres steeplechase. He competed at the 2024 Summer Olympics in Paris in the 3000 metres steeplechase, placing 13th in the final.

=== 2025 ===
He won the 2025 Canadian Athletics Championships over 3000 metres steeplechase in 8:29.82 on 31 July 2025 in Ottawa, finishing ahead of Aaron Ahl. He was named in the Canadian team for the 2025 World Athletics Championships in Tokyo, Japan. He was advanced to the final of the 3000 metres steeplechase after being involved in a fall during his heat involving New Zealand athlete Geordie Beamish. A photograph of his foot appearing to step on Beamish's face, taken by Getty Sport photographer Emilee Chinn, was nominated for the World Athletics Photo of the Year award. He ultimately finished thirteenth in the World Championship final on 15 September 2025, with Beamish winning the gold medal.

=== 2026 ===
In January 2026, he finished ninth with the Canadian mixed 4x2 km relay team at the 2026 World Athletics Cross Country Championships in Tallahassee, Florida, competing alongside Foster Malleck, Kate Current and Regan Yee. In June, he ran 8:50.71 to win the 3000 metres steeplechase at the 2026 Canadian Championships. He placed fifth competing in the 3000 m steeplechase at the 2026 Commonwealth Games in Glasgow, Scotland.

== Personal life ==
Desgagnés was born in Quebec City and raised in the nearby town of Saint-Ferréol-les-Neiges. He is currently in medical school at Université Laval and pursuing an MA in immunology. A French-language documentary, Comme Pas Deux, from film producer Marc-Alexandre Dulude of Galerie Studios, charting Desgagnés as he combined his studies with preparing for the 2024 Olympic Games was released in December 2025.

== Competition record ==
Representing Canada
Year	Competition	Venue	Position	Event	Time
2017	World Cross Country Championships	Kampala, Uganda	65th	U20 race	26:42
2017	Pan American U20 Championships	Trujillo, Peru	1st	3000 m steeplechase	8:56.57
2019	Universade	Naples, Italy	3rd	3000 m steeplechase	8:36.20
2022	World Championships	Eugene, United States	36th (h)	3000 m steeplechase	8:40.90
2023	World Championships	Budapest, Hungary	8th	3000 m steeplechase	8:15.58
2023	Pan American Games	Santiago, Chile	1st	3000 m steeplechase	8:30.14
2024	Olympic Games	Paris, France	13th	3000 m steeplechase	8:19.31
2026	Commonwealth Games	Glasgow, United Kingdom	5th	3000 m steeplechase	8:25.43
