= Athletics at the 2019 Pan American Games – Men's 3000 metres steeplechase =

Men's 3000 metres steeplechase at the 2019 Pan American Games
- Venue: Athletics Stadium
- Dates: August 10
- Competitors: 11 from 9 nations
- Winning time: 8:30.73

Medalists
Gold medal	Altobeli da Silva	Brazil
Silver medal	Carlos San Martín	Colombia
Bronze medal	Mario Bazán	Peru

The men's 3000 metres steeplechase competition of the athletics events at the 2019 Pan American Games took place the 10 August at the 2019 Pan American Games Athletics Stadium. The defending Pan American Games champion is Matthew Hughes from Canada.

== Summary ==
Benard Keter took the lead on the first lap. After the second barrier, Altobeli da Silva moved out from the middle of the pack to take the point. Ryan Smeeton followed for the next five laps as others fell off the pace. The crowd was enthusiastic as home town Mario Bazán stayed in the lead group throughout. On the penultimate lap, Travis Mahoney came forward to take the lead down the backstretch and over the water jump. da Silva again took the lead, with Keter moving up to mark. At the bell, the last in the lead group Carlos San Martín began to move forward. Smeeton fell over the barrier before the backstretch. As Sanmartín moved past Bazán on the backstretch, he picked up a trailer. Both passed Mahoney before the final water jump and were in a race for the bronze medal still 5 meters back of Keter. Still four meters behind at the final barrier, the two made a shoulder to shoulder sprint, past Keter into the finish with Sanmartín having a slight edge he held to take silver.

== Records ==
Prior to this competition, the existing world and Pan American Games records were as follows:

World record	Saif Saaeed Shaheen (QAT)	7:53.63	Brussels, Belgium	September 3, 2004
Pan American Games record	Wander do Prado Moura (BRA)	8:14.41	Mar del Plata, Argentina	March 22, 1995

== Schedule ==
Date	Time	Round
August 10, 2019	16:10	Final

== Results ==
All times shown are in seconds.

KEY:	q	Fastest non-qualifiers	Q	Qualified	NR	National record	PB	Personal best	SB	Seasonal best	DQ	Disqualified

=== Final ===
The results were as follows

Rank	Name	Nationality	Time	Notes
1st place, gold medalist(s)	Altobeli da Silva	Brazil	8:30.73	SB
2nd place, silver medalist(s)	Carlos San Martín	Colombia	8:32.24	PB
3rd place, bronze medalist(s)	Mario Bazán	Peru	8:32.34	
4	Benard Keter	United States	8:32.76	
5	Travis Mahoney	United States	8:34.77	
6	Ryan Smeeton	Canada	8:41.85	
7	Ricardo Estremera	Puerto Rico	8:43.03	
8	Diego Arévalo	Ecuador	9:01.21	
9	José Peña	Venezuela	9:02.04	
10	Roberto Tello	Chile	9:06.33	
11	Yuri Labra	Peru	9:07.97	
