= Athletics at the 2023 Pan American Games – Women's high jump =

Women's high jump at the 2023 Pan American Games
- Venue: Julio Martínez National Stadium
- Dates: November 4
- Competitors: 9 from 7 nations
- Winning height: 1.87

Medalists
Gold medal	Rachel McCoy	United States
Silver medal	Jennifer Rodríguez	Colombia
Bronze medal	Marisabel Senyu	Dominican Republic

The women's high jump competition of the athletics events at the 2023 Pan American Games took place on November 4 at the Julio Martínez National Stadium of Santiago, Chile.

== Records ==
Prior to this competition, the existing world and Pan American Games records were as follows:

World record	Stefka Kostadinova (BUL)	2.09	Rome, Italy	August 30, 1987
Pan American Games record	Coleen Sommer (USA)	1.96	Indianapolis, United States	August 13, 1987

== Schedule ==
Date	Time	Round
November 4, 2023	19:17	Final

== Results ==
All times shown are in meters.

KEY:	q	Fastest non-qualifiers	Q	Qualified	NR	National record	PB	Personal best	SB	Seasonal best	DQ	Disqualified

=== Final ===
The results were as follows:

Rank	Name	Nationality	1.70	1.75	1.78	1.81	1.84	1.87	1.90	Mark	Notes
1st place, gold medalist(s)	Rachel McCoy	United States	–	o	–	o	xo	xo	xxx	1.87	
2nd place, silver medalist(s)	Jennifer Rodríguez	Colombia	o	xo	xo	xxo	xxo	xxx		1.84	
3rd place, bronze medalist(s)	Marisabel Senyu	Dominican Republic	–	o	o	o	xxx			1.81	
4	Claudina Díaz	Mexico	o	o	o	xxx				1.78	
5	Valdiléia Martins	Brazil	–	o	xo	xxx				1.78	
6	Arielly Monteiro	Brazil	o	xo	xxo	xxx				1.78	
7	Rylee Anderson	United States	xo	xo	xxx					1.75	
	Lorena Aires	Uruguay	xxx							NH	
	Dacsy Brisón	Cuba	xxx							NH	
