= Rachel McCoy =

American high jumper (born 1995)

Personal information
- Citizenship: United States
- Born: August 1, 1995 (age 30)
- Home town: Fontana, California
- Height: 5 ft 11 in (180 cm)
- Weight: 135 lb (61 kg)

Sport
- Country: United States
- Sport: Athletics/ Track and field
- Events: High jump 60 metres
- University team: Long Island University; Chaffey College
- Turned pro: 2014
- Coached by: Sue Humphrey
Medal record
Women's athletics
Representing United States
Summer Olympics
	2021 Tokyo	High jump
World Athletics Championships
	2022 Eugene	High jump
World Athletics Indoor Championships
	2022 Belgrade	High jump
World Athletics U20 Championships
	2014 Eugene	High jump
Pan American Games
Gold medal – first place	2023 Santiago	High Jump
NACAC Championships
	2016 San Salvador	High Jump

Rachel McCoy (born August 1, 1995) is an American athlete who competes in the high jump.

== Career ==
McCoy equaled her lifetime best height of 1.93 m (6 ft 4 in) at the USATF Throws Festival in Tucson, Arizona in May 2021 and within a week had surpassed it and made the Olympic qualifying standard of 1.96 m (6 ft 5 in) at the USATF Invitational event at the Prairie View A&M University on May 26, 2021. In June 2021 she was ranked 19th in the world. She finished in a tie-breaker fourth place at the Olympic Trials, but by virtue of being one of only three Americans with the standard, was selected for the American team to compete at the delayed 2020 Tokyo Olympics.

McCoy had previously met the qualifying standard for the 2016 Olympics but finished 9th in the American 2016 Olympic Trials and was not selected.

McCoy qualified for Team USA for the 2nd time where she competed and placed 4th in the women's high jump at 2016 NACAC U23 Championships in Athletics.

McCoy won gold at the 2023 Pan American Games in Santiago, Chile in November 2023.

== Major competition record ==
Year	Competition	Venue	Position	Event	Notes
Representing the United States
2014	2014 World Junior Championships in Athletics	Eugene, Oregon	4th	High jump.	1.88 m (6 ft 2 in)
2016	2016 NACAC U23 Championships in Athletics	San Salvador, El Salvador	4th	High jump.	1.75 m (5 ft 9 in)
2021	Athletics at the 2020 Summer Olympics	Tokyo, Japan	T-25th	High jump	1.86 m (6 ft 1 in)
2022	World Athletics Indoor Championships	Belgrade, Serbia	12th	High jump.	1.84 m (6 ft 0 in)
2022	World Athletics Championships	Eugene, Oregon	17th	High jump.	1.90 m (6 ft 3 in)
2023	Pan American Games	Santiago, Chile	1st	High Jump.	1.87 m (6 ft 2 in)

=== National championships ===
Year	Competition	Venue	Position	Event	Notes
2014	USATF U20 Outdoor Championships	Eugene, Oregon	5th	High Jump	1.65 m (5 ft 5 in)
2015	USA Indoor Track and Field Championships	Boston, Massachusetts	6th	High Jump	1.76 m (5 ft 9 in)
2015	USA Outdoor Track and Field Championships	Eugene, Oregon	6th	High Jump	1.82 m (6 ft 0 in)
2016	USA Indoor Track and Field Championships	Portland, Oregon	5th	High Jump	1.85 m (6 ft 1 in)
2016	US Olympic Trials	Eugene, Oregon	8th	High Jump	1.84 m (6 ft 0 in)
2020	USA Indoor Track and Field Championships	Albuquerque, New Mexico	5th	High Jump	1.84 m (6 ft 0 in)
2021	US Olympic Trials	Eugene, Oregon	4th	High Jump	1.93 m (6 ft 4 in)
2022	USA Indoor Track and Field Championships	Spokane, Washington	4th	High Jump	1.85 m (6 ft 1 in)
2022	USA Outdoor Track and Field Championships	Eugene, Oregon	3rd	High Jump	1.90 m (6 ft 3 in)
2023	USA Outdoor Track and Field Championships	Eugene, Oregon	5th	High Jump	1.86 m (6 ft 1 in)

== College ==
McCoy started at Long Island University in 2013 where she signed a National Letter of Intent to play basketball, and transferred to Chaffey College where she earned All-America honors after earning silver medal at 2014 California Community College Athletic Association state track and field championships clearing high jump bar of 1.75 m (5 ft 9 in) at Mt. San Antonio College's Hilmer Lodge Stadium. McCoy won the 2014 women's High Jump title at the Pacific Coast Athletic Conference Track and Field Championships clearing a 1.82 m (6 ft 0 in) bar.

McCoy jumped 1.83 m (6 ft 0 in) San Diego State Aztecs Invitational which qualified for the 2014 USATF U20 Outdoor Championships, where she made Team USA for the first time. McCoy placed 4th at 2014 World Junior Championships in Athletics in the High jump.

== Prep ==
McCoy is a 2013 graduate of A. B. Miller High School in Fontana, California where she set Miller high school records in High Jump 1.8478 m (6 ft 0.75 in), and Long Jump 4.965 m (16 ft 3.5 in). Rachel McCoy also ran 100 Meters 12.57, 200 Meters 25.96 as a sophomore.

As a senior, McCoy won the girls high jump after she jumped 1.8478 m (6 ft 0.75 in) at the 2013 CIF California State Meet.
As a sophomore, McCoy won the girls high jump after she jumped 1.73 m (5 ft 8 in) at the 2011 CIF California State Meet.
