= Fernando Martínez (runner) =

Mexican distance runner (born 1993)

Personal information
- Full name: Fernando Daniel Martínez Estrada
- Born: 30 May 1993 (age 33)

Sport
- Country: Mexico
- Sport: Athletics
- Events: 1500 metres, 5000 metres

Achievements and titles
- National finals: 5 titles (1500 m, 5000 m)
- Personal bests: 1500 metres: 3:39.26; 5000 metres: 13:47.28
Medal record
Men's athletics
Representing Mexico
Pan American Games
Gold medal – first place	2019 Lima	5000 m
Central American and Caribbean Games
Gold medal – first place	2018 Barranquilla	1500 m
Gold medal – first place	2023 San Salvador	1500 m

Fernando Daniel Martínez Estrada (Note: In this Spanish name, the first or paternal surname is Martínez and the second or maternal family name is Estrada.) (born 30 May 1993) is a Mexican distance runner who competes over distances from 800 metres to the 10K run. He has won five national titles at the Mexican Athletics Championships, three at 1500 metres and two at 5000 metres. Martínez was the gold medallist over 5000 m at the 2019 Pan American Games and the 1500 m winner at the 2018 Central American and Caribbean Games.

He made his debut over the 10 kilometres distance in 2020.

In 2020, Martínez's ex-partner publicly denounced him for gender-based violence during their four-year relationship.

== International competitions ==
Representing Mexico
Year	Competition	Venue	Position	Event	Result	Notes
2017	Universiade	Taipei, Taiwan	9th	1500 m	3:47.18	
2017	Universiade	Taipei, Taiwan	20th (q)	5000 m	14:52.65	9th in heat 1
2018	CAC Games	Barranquilla, Colombia	1st	1500 m	3:56.57	
2018	CAC Games	Barranquilla, Colombia	5th	5000 m	14:28.29	
2019	Pan American Games	Lima, Peru	7th	1500 m	3:45.13	
2019	Pan American Games	Lima, Peru	1st	5000 m	13:53.87	
2022	World Indoor Championships	Belgrade, Serbia	33rd (h)	3000 m	8:15.58	
2023	CAC Games	San Salvador, El Salvador	1st	1500 m	3:43.47	
2023	CAC Games	San Salvador, El Salvador	–	5000 m	DNF	
2023	Pan American Games	Santiago, Chile	9th	1500 m	3:41.77	
2023	Pan American Games	Santiago, Chile	–	5000 m	DQ	
2024	Ibero-American Championships	Cuiabá, Brazil	8th	1500 m	3:48.80	
2024	Ibero-American Championships	Cuiabá, Brazil	–	5000 m	DNF	

== National titles ==
- Mexican Athletics Championships
  - 1500 m: 2016, 2018, 2019
  - 5000 m: 2018, 2019

== Personal bests ==
- 800 metres – 1:51.78 (2016)
- 1500 metres – 3:39.26 (2017)
- Mile run – 3:57.92 (2018)
- 5000 metres – 13:47.28 (2019)
- 10K run – 29:59 (2019)

== See also ==
- List of Central American and Caribbean Games medalists in athletics
- List of Pan American Games medalists in athletics (men)
