= Jennifer Rodríguez =

Colombian high jumper (born 1999)

Personal information
- Full name: Jennifer Laritza Rodríguez Carvajal
- Born: 18 November 1999 (age 26)
- Height: 1.83 m (6 ft 0 in)
- Weight: 67 kg (148 lb)

Sport
- Sport: Athletics
- Event: High jump
- Coached by: José Arturo Posada

Achievements and titles
- Personal best: High jump: 1.90 m (2021)
Medal record
Representing Colombia
Women's athletics
Event	1st	2nd	3rd
Pan American Games	0	1	0
Ibero-American Championships	0	0	1
South American Championships	1	0	1
Bolivarian Games	1	0	0
Junior Pan American Games	1	0	0
South American U23 Championships	1	0	0
Total	4	1	2
Pan American Games
Silver medal – second place	2023 Santiago	High jump
Ibero-American Championships
Bronze medal – third place	2022 Alicante	High jump
South American Championships
Gold medal – first place	2021 Guayaquil	High jump
Bronze medal – third place	2023 São Paulo	High jump
Bolivarian Games
Gold medal – first place	2022 Valledupar	High jump
Junior Pan American Games
Gold medal – first place	2021 Cali-Valle	High jump
South American U23 Championships
Gold medal – first place	2021 Guayaquil	High jump

Jennifer Laritza Rodríguez Carvajal (born 18 November 1999) is a Colombian athlete specialising in the high jump. She represented her country at the World Championships in Eugene without qualifying for the final.

Her personal bests in the event are 1.90 metres outdoors (Ibagué 2021) and 1.87 metres indoors (Brno 2022), current national record.

== Personal bests ==
Event	Best (m)	Venue	Date
High jump	1.90	(Colombia) Ibagué	25 April 2021

Key: AR = Area record, NR = National record

== International competitions ==
Year	Competition	Venue	Position	Event	Result
Representing Colombia
2017	Bolivarian Games	Santa Marta, Colombia	4th	High jump	1.70 m
2018	South American Games	Cochabamba, Bolivia	5th	High jump	1.80 m
2021	South American Championships	Guayaquil, Ecuador	1st	High jump	1.89 m
2021	South American U23 Championships	Guayaquil, Ecuador	1st	High jump	1.80 m
2021	Junior Pan American Games (U23)	Cali, Colombia	1st	High jump	1.90 m
2022	Ibero-American Championships	La Nucia, Spain	3rd	High jump	1.84 m
2022	Bolivarian Games	Valledupar, Colombia	1st	High jump	1.84 m
2022	World Championships	Eugene, Oregon, United States	28th (q)	High jump	1.75 m
2022	South American Games	Asunción, Paraguay	4th	High jump	1.75 m
2023	South American Championships	São Paulo, Brazil	3rd	High jump	1.78 m
2023	Pan American Games	Santiago, Chile	2nd	High jump	1.84 m
2024	Ibero-American Championships	Cuiabá, Brazil	5th	High jump	1.81 m
