= Rantso Mokopane =

South African runner

Personal information
- Born: 8 August 1994 (age 31)
- Education: North-West University

Sport
- Sport: Athletics
- Event: 3000 metres steeplechase

Rantso Alfred Mokopane (born 8 August 1994) is a South African runner specialising in the 3000 metres steeplechase. He won silver medals at the 2017 and 2019 Summer Universiade.

== International competitions ==
Year	Competition	Venue	Position	Event	Notes
Representing South Africa
2016	African Championships	Durban, South Africa	7th	3000 m s'chase	8:35.02
2017	Universiade	Taipei, Taiwan	11th	1500 m	3:47.97
2017	Universiade	Taipei, Taiwan	2nd	3000 m s'chase	8:36.25
2019	Universiade	Naples, Italy	2nd	3000 m s'chase	8:30.37
2019	World Championships	Doha, Qatar	41st (h)	3000 m s'chase	8:42.22

== Personal bests ==
Outdoor

- 800 metres – 1:53.41 (Pretoria 2014)
- 1500 metres – 3:38.83 (Cape Town 2017)
- One mile – 3:58.92 (Paarl 2018)
- 3000 metres – 7:57.40 (Nembro 2019)
- 5000 metres – 14:05.04 (Cape Town 2017)
- 3000 metres steeplechase – 8:30.37 (Naples 2019)
- 10 kilometres – 30:03 (Durban 2017)
