= Lucas Bruchet =

Canadian track and field athlete

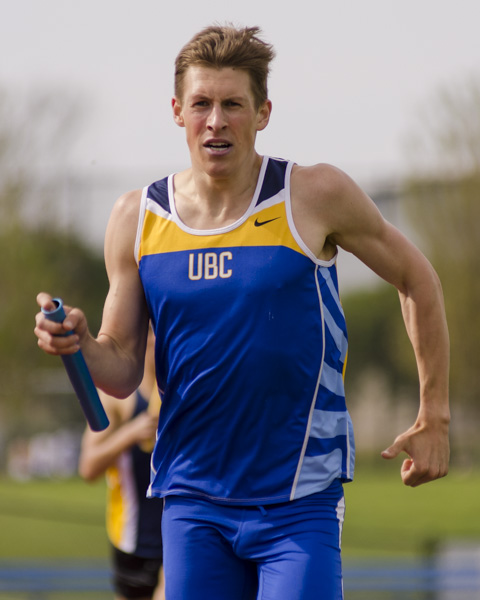
- Bruchet competing at the 2013 UBC Last Chance Meet

Personal information
- Born: February 23, 1991 (age 35) Vancouver, British Columbia
- Height: 181 cm (5 ft 11 1/2 in)
- Weight: 69 kg (152 lb)

Sport
- Country: Canada
- Sport: Athletics
- Event: Middle distance
- Coached by: Richard Lee

Achievements and titles
- Personal bests: Outdoor; 1500 m: 3:37.79 (Mission Viejo, CA 2021); Mile: 3:58.60 (Burnaby, British Columbia 2021); 3000 m: 7:46.89 (Concord, MA 2017); 5000 m: 13:12.56 (Burnaby, British Columbia 2021); 10,000 m: 27:56.12 (San Juan Capistrano, CA 2022); Half Marathon: 1:03:12 (Mission, British Columbia 2021); Indoor; Mile: 3:57.70 (Seattle, WA 2014); 3000 m: 7:49.65 (Boston, MA 2020); 5000 m: 13:40.13 (Boston 2020)

Lucas Bruchet (born February 23, 1991, in Vancouver, British Columbia) is a Canadian track and field athlete who competed in the middle-distance events, predominantly the 5,000m event. He competed in the 5000 metres at the 2015 Pan American Games in Toronto, where he finished 8th.

== Running career ==
Bruchet ran collegially for the University of British Columbia. In June 2016, he ran a personal best of 13:24.10 (in the 5,000 metres event), meeting the Olympic Standard. In July, he was officially named to the Olympic team. In the Men's 5,000 metres at the 2016 Olympics he finished 37th after failing to qualify for the finals

He competed at the 2020 Summer Olympics in the 5000m where he was 12th in his heat.

In February 2023 he announced he was retiring from professional running.

== High school ==
Bruchet attended Elgin Park Secondary in Surrey, British Columbia. While still in high school, Bruchet finished in seventh place in the 1500 meters at the 2009 Pan American Junior Athletics Championships

== Career highlights ==
Canadian Cross Country Champion 2013, 2017, 2018

== Personal bests ==
- 1500 metres (track) - 3:37.79 (2021)
- One Mile (indoor track) - 3.57.71 (2014)
- 3000 metres (track) - 7:46.89 (2017)
- 5,000 metres (track) - 13:12.56 min (2021)
- 10,000 metres (track) - 27:56.12 min (2022)
- 5 km (road) - 14:08 min (2016)
