= Altobeli da Silva =

Brazilian runner (born 1990)

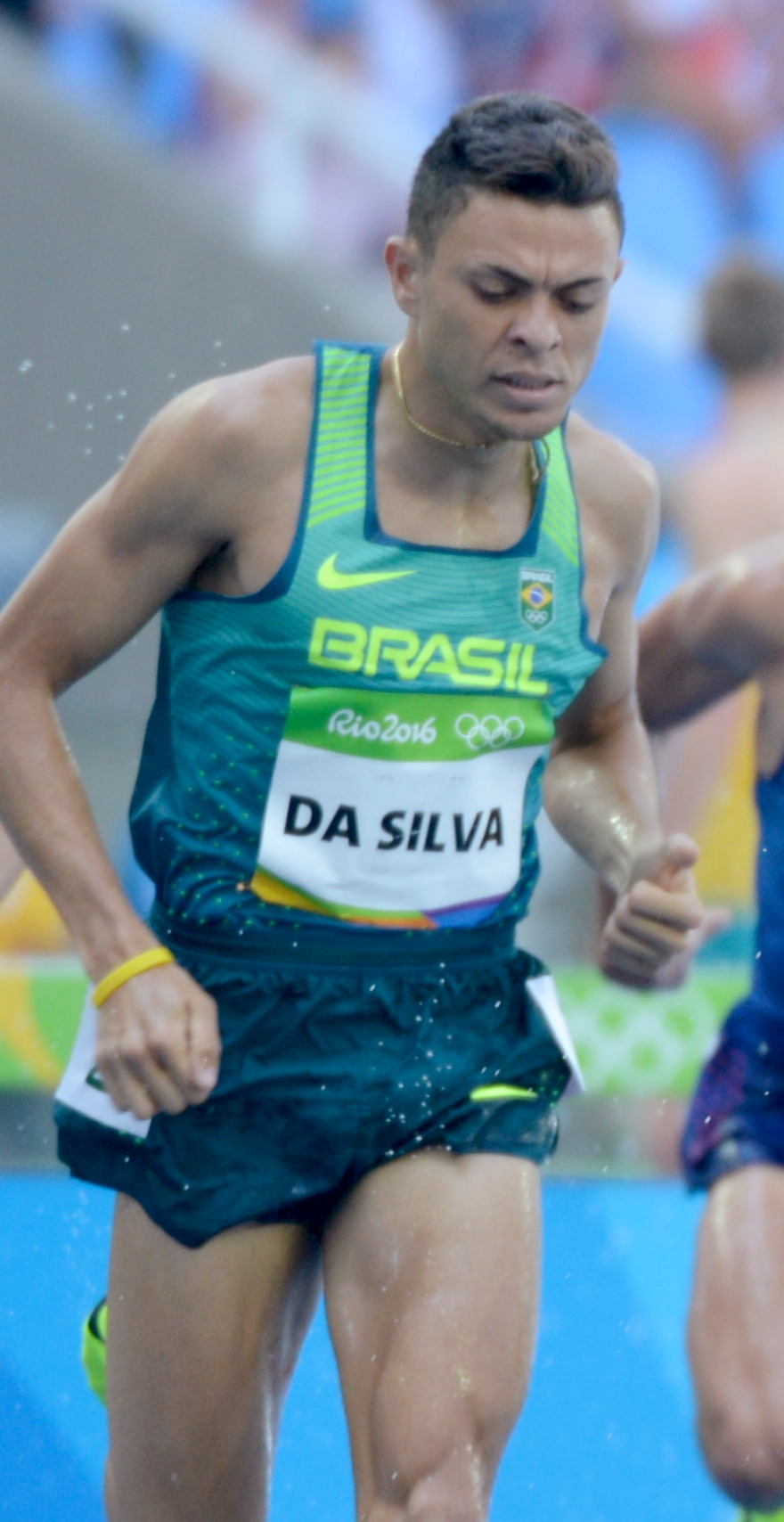
- Da Silva at the 2016 Olympics

Personal information
- Born: 3 December 1990 (age 35) Catanduva, Brazil
- Height: 1.81 m (5 ft 11 in)
- Weight: 60 kg (132 lb)

Sport
- Sport: Athletics
- Events: 1500 m – half marathon, 3000 m steeplechase
- Club: ASA São Bernardo
- Coached by: Guilherme Salgado

Achievements and titles
- Personal bests: 1500 m – 3:42.56 (2021); 3000 m – 7:51.48 (2017); 3000 mS – 8:23.67 (2015); 5000 m – 13:23.85 (2018); 10,000 m – 29:30.03 (2020); 10 km – 28:58 (2013); HM – 1:03:53 (2015)
Medal record
Men's athletics
Representing Brazil
Pan American Games
Gold medal – first place	2019 Lima	3000 m step
Silver medal – second place	2019 Lima	5000 m
Bronze medal – third place	2023 Santiago	5000 m
Ibero-American Championships
Gold medal – first place	2018 Trujillo	3000 m
Gold medal – first place	2018 Trujillo	3000 m s'chase
Gold medal – first place	2016 Rio de Janeiro	5000 m
Gold medal – first place	2016 Rio de Janeiro	3000 m s'chase
Silver medal – second place	2014 São Paulo	5000 m

Altobeli Santos da Silva (born 3 December 1990) is a Brazilian distance runner. He finished ninth in the 3000 m steeplechase at the 2016 Summer Olympics. In 2017, he competed in the men's 3000 metres steeplechase at the 2017 World Athletics Championships held in London, United Kingdom. He competed at the 2020 Summer Olympics.

Da Silva was named after the Italian football striker Alessandro Altobelli. In his early years he earned money by delivering leaflets for a local supermarket. He once entered a 10 km road race aiming to win its top prize, a motorbike, which he needed for his job. He failed to win, but met his future coach Guilherme Salgado.

== Personal bests ==
- 3000 m steeplechase: 8:23.67 – (Morocco) Rabat, 16 Jul 2017
- 5000 m: 13:23.85 – (United States) Palo Alto, 3 May 2018

== International competitions ==
Year	Competition	Venue	Position	Event	Notes
Representing Brazil
2012	South American U23 Championships	São Paulo, Brazil	7th	5000 m	14:45.76
2012	South American U23 Championships	São Paulo, Brazil	5th	10,000 m	30:41.39
2014	Ibero-American Championships	São Paulo, Brazil	2nd	5000 m	13:54.65
2015	Pan American Games	Toronto, Canada	6th	5000 m	13:49.00
2016	Ibero-American Championships	Rio de Janeiro, Brazil	1st	5000 m	13:53.48
2016	Ibero-American Championships	Rio de Janeiro, Brazil	1st	3000 m s'chase	8:33.72
2016	Olympic Games	Rio de Janeiro, Brazil	9th	3000 m s'chase	8:26.30
2017	World Championships	London, United Kingdom	21st (h)	3000 m s'chase	8:31.82
2018	Ibero-American Championships	Trujillo, Peru	1st	3000 m	7:57.52
2018	Ibero-American Championships	Trujillo, Peru	1st	3000 m s'chase	8:35.57
2019	South American Championships	Lima, Peru	1st	5000 m	13:50.08
2019	South American Championships	Lima, Peru	2nd	3000 m s'chase	8:38.43
2019	Pan American Games	Lima, Peru	2nd	5000 m	13:54.42
2019	Pan American Games	Lima, Peru	1st	3000 m s'chase	8:30.73
2019	World Championships	Doha, Qatar	21st (h)	3000 m s'chase	8:25.34
2021	South American Championships	Guayaquil, Ecuador	1st	5000 m	13:51.81
2021	South American Championships	Guayaquil, Ecuador	1st	3000 m s'chase	8:34.17
2021	Olympic Games	Tokyo, Japan	28th (h)	3000 m s'chase	8:29.17
2022	World Championships	Eugene, United States	29th (h)	5000 m	13:43.80
2023	South American Championships	São Paulo, Brazil	3rd	5000 m	13:55.91
2023	South American Championships	São Paulo, Brazil	–	10,000 m	DNF
2023	Pan American Games	Santiago, Chile	3rd	5000 m	14:48.18
2024	Ibero-American Championships	Cuiabá, Brazil	1st	5000 m	14:27.38
2024	Ibero-American Championships	Cuiabá, Brazil	2nd	3000 m s'chase	8:37.13
