= Athletics at the 2023 Pan American Games =

- Athletics pictograms
- Venues: Julio Martínez National Stadium Coliseum; Santiago streets
- Start date: October 22, 2023
- End date: November 4, 2023
- No. of events: 48 (23 men, 23 women, 2 mixed)

Athletics competitions at the 2023 Pan American Games in Santiago, Chile will be held on October 22, between October 29 and November 4, 2023 at the Athletics Stadium in the Julio Martínez National Stadium Coliseum, with the marathon and walks being held in the Santiago streets.

A total of 48 events will be contested, 23 each for men and women, and two mixed events.

== Qualification ==
A total of 778 athletes will qualify to compete. Each nation may enter a maximum of two athletes in each individual event (provided the second person is the reigning 2022 area champion), and one team per relay event. Each event has a maximum number of competitors and a minimum performance standard. Chile as host nation, is granted an automatic athlete slot per event, in the event no one qualifies for that respective event.

The winner of each individual event (plus top two relay teams per event), from four regional qualification tournaments automatically qualified with the standard (even if not reached). If an event quota is not filled, athletes will be invited till the maximum number per event is reached.

For relays, each country can enter two relay only competitors to participate. The other members of each relay team must be registered in an individual event.

Qualifying standards must be achieved between 1 January 2022 and 18 September 2023.

== Competition schedule ==
The competition schedule for athletics at the 2023 Pan American Games is announced.

Day 1— Sunday, October 22, 2023
Road Events
Time CLST (UTC−3)	Event	Division	Round
3:00 a.m.	Marathon	Men	Final
3:15 a.m.	Marathon	Women	Final
Day 2— Sunday, October 29, 2023
Road Events
Time	Event	Division	Round
3:00 a.m.	20 km Race Walk	Women	Final
5:30 a.m.	20 km Race Walk	Men	Final
Day 3— Monday, October 30, 2023
Track Events
Time	Event	Division	Round
1:50 p.m.	400m	Women	Semi-Final
2:20 p.m.	400m	Men	Semi-Final
2:50 p.m.	100m	Men	Semi-Final
3:20 p.m.	100m	Women	Semi-Final
3:46 p.m.	10,000m	Women	Final
5:00 p.m.	4 × 400 m Relay	Mixed	Final
Field Events
1:55 p.m.	Discus	Women	Final
3:00 p.m.	Long Jump	Women	Final
3:40 p.m.	Discus	Men	Final
Decathlon
Time	Event	Division	Round
11:30 a.m.	100m	Men	Decathlon Final
12:10 p.m.	Long Jump	Men	Decathlon Final
1:40 p.m.	Shot Put	Men	Decathlon Final
3:15 p.m.	High Jump	Men	Decathlon Final
4:35 p.m.	400m	Men	Decathlon Final
Day 4— Tuesday, October 31, 2023
Time	Event	Division	Round
Decathlon
5:00 a.m.	110m Hurdles	Men	Decathlon Final
5:40 a.m.	Discus Throw	Men	Decathlon Final
7:00 a.m.	Pole Vault	Men	Decathlon Final
2:20 p.m.	Javelin Throw	Men	Decathlon Final
4:35 p.m.	1500m	Men	Decathlon Final
Track Events
2:45 p.m.	100m Hurdles	Women	Semi-Final
3:20 p.m.	110m Hurdles	Men	Semi-Final
3:55 p.m.	5000m	Men	Final
4:50 p.m.	100m	Women	Final
5:00 p.m.	100m	Men	Final
Field Event
2:00 p.m.	Long Jump	Men	Final
Day 5— Wednesday, November 1, 2023
Time	Event	Division	Round
Track Events
1:48 p.m.	400m Hurdles	Women	Semi-Final
2:18 p.m.	400m Hurdles	Men	Semi-Final
2:53 p.m.	200m	Women	Semi-Final
3:22 p.m.	200m	Men	Semi-Final
3:48 p.m.	100m Hurdles	Women	Final
4:03 p.m.	110m Hurdles	Men	Final
4:23 p.m.	400m	Women	Final
4:31 p.m.	400m	Men	Final
Field Event
1:20 p.m.	Hammer	Women	Final
Heptathlon
1:00 p.m.	100m Hurdles	Women	Heptathlon Final
1:45 p.m.	High Jump	Women	Heptathlon Final
3:42 p.m.	Shot Put	Women	Heptathlon Final
4:52 p.m.	200m	Women	Heptathlon Final
Day 6— Thursday, November 2, 2023
Time	Event	Division	Round
Heptathlon
1:40 p.m.	Long Jump	Women	Heptathlon Final
3:05 a.m.	Javelin	Women	Heptathlon Final
4:30 p.m.	800m	Women	Heptathlon Final
Field Events
1:30 p.m.	Pole Vault	Women	Final
2:15 p.m.	Shot Put	Women	Final
3:45 p.m.	Triple Jump	Men	Final
Track Events
1:45 p.m.	4 × 100 m Relay	Women	Semi-Final
2:25 p.m.	4 × 100 m Relay	Men	Semi-Final
3:15 p.m.	1500m	Men	Final
3:35 p.m.	5000m	Women	Final
4:00 p.m.	200m	Women	Final
4:10 p.m.	200m	Men	Final
4:47 p.m.	4 × 100 m Relay	Women	Final
5:00 p.m.	4 × 100 m Relay	Men	Final
Day 7— Friday, November 3, 2023
Time	Event	Division	Round
Track Events
1:00 p.m.	800m	Women	Semi-Final
1:35 p.m.	400m Hurdles	Women	Semi-Final
2:55 p.m.	10,000m	Men	Final
3:40 p.m.	800m	Men	Semi-Final
4:10 p.m.	1500m	Women	Final
4:30 p.m.	4 × 400 m Relay	Women	Semi-Final
4:50 p.m.	4 × 400 m Relay	Men	Semi-Final
Field Events
1:25 p.m.	Shot Put	Men	Final
1:30 p.m.	High Jump	Men	Final
2:50 p.m.	Triple Jump	Women	Final
3:15 p.m.	Javelin	Women	Final
Day 8 — Saturday, November 4, 2023
Time	Event	Division	Round
Road Event
2:30 a.m.	Marathon Race Walk Relay	Mixed	Final
Track Event
2:00 p.m.	800m	Women	Final
2:15 p.m.	800m	Men	Final
3:20 p.m.	3000m Steeplechase	Women	Final
3:35 p.m.	3000m Steeplechase	Men	Final
4:35 p.m.	4 × 400 m Relay	Men	Final
4:45 p.m.	4 × 400 m Relay	Women	Final
Field Events
1:00 p.m.	Hammer	Men	Final
1:30 p.m.	Pole Vault	Men	Final
3:15 p.m.	High Jump	Women	Final
3:40 p.m.	Javelin	Men	Final

== Medal summary ==
=== Medal table ===
* Host nation (Chile)

Rank	NOC's	Gold	Silver	Bronze	Total
1	United States	8	5	12	25
2	Brazil	7	10	6	23
3	Cuba	7	6	5	18
4	Canada	4	3	2	9
5	Dominican Republic	3	3	3	9
6	Colombia	3	2	2	7
7	Chile*	3	2	1	6
8	Venezuela	3	2	0	5
9	Peru	3	1	3	7
10	Ecuador	2	2	0	4
11	Mexico	1	5	2	8
12	Argentina	1	2	1	4
13	Jamaica	1	0	3	4
14	Costa Rica	1	0	1	2
15	Panama	1	0	0	1
16	Puerto Rico	0	2	0	2
17	Guyana	0	1	2	3
18	Bahamas	0	1	1	2
19	Uruguay	0	1	0	1
20	Dominica	0	0	1	1
20	Independent Athletes Team	0	0	1	1
20	Saint Kitts and Nevis	0	0	1	1
20	Trinidad and Tobago	0	0	1	1
Totals (23 entries)		48	48	48	144

== Results ==
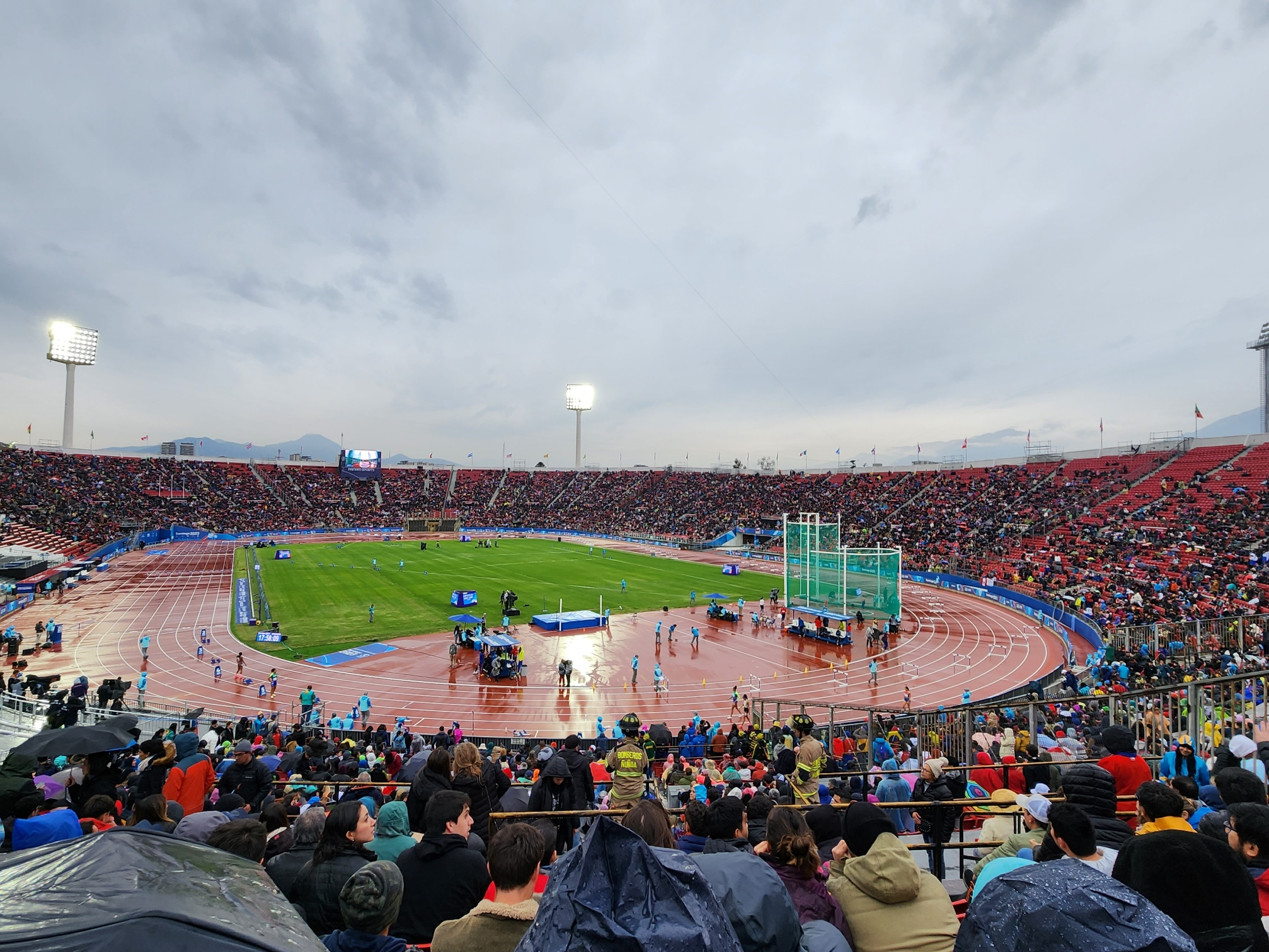
The athletics venue during the competition

=== Men ===
Event	Gold		Silver		Bronze	
100 metres	José González; Dominican Republic	10.30	Felipe Bardi; Brazil	10.31 (.302)	Emanuel Archibald; Guyana	10.31 (.310)
200 metres	Renan Gallina; Brazil	20.37	José González; Dominican Republic	20.56	Nadale Buntin; Saint Kitts and Nevis	20.79
400 metres	Lucas Conceição; Brazil	45.77	Luis Avilés; Mexico	45.97	Martín Kouyoumdjian; Chile	46.58
800 metres	José Antonio Maita; Venezuela	1:45.69	Jesús Tonatiú López; Mexico	1:46.04	Navasky Anderson; Jamaica	1:46.40
1500 metres	Charles Philibert-Thiboutot; Canada	3:39.74	Robert Heppenstall; Canada	3:39.76	Casey Comber; United States	3:39.90
5000 metres	Kasey Knevelbaard; United States	14:47.69	Charles Philibert-Thiboutot; Canada	14:48.02	Altobeli da Silva; Brazil	14:48.18
10,000 metres	Isai Rodriguez; United States	28:17.84	Samuel Chelanga; United States	29:01.21	Alberto González; Independent Athletes Team	29:12.24
110 metres hurdles	Eduardo de Deus; Brazil	13.67	De'Vion Wilson; United States	13.78	Rafael Pereira; Brazil	14.04
400 metres hurdles	Jaheel Hyde; Jamaica	49.19	Matheus Lima; Brazil	49.69	Yoao Illas; Cuba	49.74
3000 metres steeplechase	Jean-Simon Desgagnés; Canada	8:30.14	Daniel Michalski; United States	8:36.47	Carlos San Martín; Colombia	8:41.59
4 × 100 metres relay	Brazil; Rodrigo do Nascimento; Felipe Bardi; Erik Cardoso; Renan Gallina	38.68	Cuba; Reynaldo Espinosa; Edel Amores; Yaniel Carrero; Shainer Reginfo	39.26	Argentina; Tomás Mondino; Bautista Diamante; Juan Ignacio Ciampitti; Franco Florio	39.48; SB
4 × 400 metres relay	Brazil; Lucas Carvalho; Matheus Lima; Douglas Mendes; Lucas Conceição	3:03.92	Mexico; Guillermo Campos; Luis Avilés; Edgar Ramírez; Valente Mendoza	3:04.22	Dominican Republic; Ezequiel Suárez; Robert King; Ferdy Agramonte; Yeral Nuñez	3:05.98
Marathon	Cristhian Pacheco; Peru	2:11:14	Hugo Catrileo; Chile	2:12:07	Luis Ostos; Peru	2:12:34
20 kilometres walk	David Hurtado; Ecuador	1:19.20 GR	Caio Bonfim; Brazil	1:19.24	Andrés Olivas; Mexico	1:19.56
High jump	Luis Zayas; Cuba	2.27	Luis Joel Castro; Puerto Rico	2.24	Donald Thomas; Bahamas	2.24
Pole vault	Matt Ludwig; United States	5.55	Germán Chiaraviglio; Argentina	5.50	Jorge Luna; Mexico	5.40
Long jump	Arnovis Dalmero; Colombia	8.08	Alejandro Parada; Cuba	8.01	Maikel Vidal; Cuba	8.01
Triple jump	Lázaro Martínez; Cuba	17.19	Almir dos Santos; Brazil	16.92	Cristian Nápoles; Cuba	16.66
Shot put	Darlan Romani; Brazil	21.36	Uziel Muñoz; Mexico	21.15	Jordan Geist; United States	20.53
Discus throw	Lucas Nervi; Chile	63.39; SB	Mauricio Ortega; Colombia	61.86	Fedrick Dacres; Jamaica	61.25
Hammer throw	Ethan Katzberg; Canada	80.96 GR	Daniel Haugh; United States	77.82	Rudy Winkler; United States	76.65
Javelin throw	Curtis Thompson; United States	79.65	Pedro Henrique Rodrigues; Brazil	78.45	Leslain Baird; Guyana	78.23
Decathlon	Santiago Ford; Chile	7834	José Fernando Ferreira; Brazil	7748	Ryan Talbot; United States	7742

=== Women ===
Event	Gold		Silver		Bronze	
100 metres	Yunisleidy García; Cuba	11.36	Jasmine Abrams; Guyana	11.52	Michelle-Lee Ahye; Trinidad and Tobago	11.53
200 metres	Marileidy Paulino; Dominican Republic	22.74	Yunisleidy García; Cuba	23.33	Ana Carolina Azevedo; Brazil	23.52
400 metres	Martina Weil; Chile	51.48	Nicole Caicedo; Ecuador	51.76	Evelis Aguilar; Colombia	51.95
800 metres	Sahily Diago; Cuba	2:02.71	Déborah Rodríguez; Uruguay	2:02.88	Rose Mary Almanza; Cuba	2:03.68
1500 metres	Joselyn Brea; Venezuela	4:11.80	Daily Cooper; Cuba	4:11.86	Emily Mackay; United States	4:12.02
5000 metres	Joselyn Brea; Venezuela	16:04.12	Taylor Werner; United States	16:06.48	Julie-Anne Staehli; Canada	16:06.75
10,000 metres	Luz Mery Rojas; Peru	33:12.19	Laura Galván; Mexico	33:15.85	Ednah Kurgat; United States	33:16.61
100 metres hurdles	Andrea Vargas; Costa Rica	13.06	Greisys Roble; Cuba	13.09	Alaysha Johnson; United States	13.19
400 metres hurdles	Gianna Woodruff; Panama	56.44	Ewellyn Santos; Brazil	57.18	Daniela Rojas; Costa Rica	57.41
3000 metres steeplechase	Belén Casetta; Argentina	9:39.47 GR	Alycia Butterworth; Canada	9:40.86	Tatiane da Silva; Brazil	9:41.29 PB
4 × 100 metres relay	Cuba; Laura Moreira; Enis Verdecia; Yarima García; Yunisleidy García; Jocelyn Echazabal *	43.72	Chile; Anaís Hernández; Martina Weil; Isidora Jiménez; Maria Ignacia Montt	44.19; NR	Dominican Republic; Liranyi Alonso; Marileidy Paulino; Martha Méndez; Anabel Medina; Darianny Jiménez *	44.32
4 × 400 metres relay	Cuba; Zurian Hechavarría; Rose Mary Almanza; Sahily Diago; Lisneidy Veitía	3:33.15	Dominican Republic; Mariana Pérez; Anabel Medina; Franshina Martínez; Marileidy Paulino	3:34.27	Brazil; Anny de Bassi; Letícia Nonato; Jainy dos Santos; Tiffani Marinho	3:34.80
Marathon	Citlali Cristian; Mexico	2:27:12 GR	Florencia Borelli; Argentina	2:27:29	Gladys Tejeda; Peru	2:30:39
20 kilometres walk	Kimberly García; Peru	—	Glenda Morejón; Ecuador	—	Evelyn Inga; Peru	—
High jump	Rachel McCoy; United States	1.87	Jennifer Rodríguez; Colombia	1.84	Marisabel Senyu; Dominican Republic	1.81
Pole vault	Bridget Williams; United States	4.60	Robeilys Peinado; Venezuela	4.55	Aslin Quiala; Cuba	4.40
Long jump	Natalia Linares; Colombia	6.66	Eliane Martins; Brazil	6.49	Tiffany Flynn; United States	6.40
Triple jump	Leyanis Pérez; Cuba	14.75	Liadagmis Povea; Cuba	14.41	Thea Lafond; Dominica	14.25
Shot put	Sarah Mitton; Canada	19.19	Rosa Ramírez; Dominican Republic	17.99	Adelaide Aquilla; United States	17.73
Discus throw	Izabela da Silva; Brazil	59.63	Andressa de Morais; Brazil	59.29	Samantha Hall; Jamaica	59.14
Hammer throw	DeAnna Price; United States	72.34	Rosa Rodríguez; Venezuela	71.59	Kaila Butler; Canada	65.10
Javelin throw	Flor Ruiz; Colombia	63.10	Rhema Otabor; Bahamas	60.54	Madelyn Harris; United States	60.06
Heptathlon	Erin Marsh; United States	5882	Alysbeth Félix; Puerto Rico	5665	Jordan Gray; United States	5494

=== Mixed events ===
Event	Gold		Silver		Bronze	
4 × 400 metres relay	Dominican Republic; Ezequiel Suárez; Anabel Medina; Robert King; Marileidy Paulino	3:16.05	Brazil; Douglas Hernandes; Letícia Nonato; Lucas Conceição; Tiffani Marinho	3:18.55	United States; Demarius Smith; Honour Finley; Richard Kuydendoll; Jada Griffin	3:19.41
Race walk mixed team	Ecuador; Glenda Morejón; Brian Pintado	2:56.49	Peru; Kimberly García; César Rodríguez	3:01.14	Brazil; Viviane Lyra; Caio Bonfim	3:02.14

* Indicates the athlete only competed in the preliminary heats and received medals.

== Controversies ==
=== Wrong distance in the women's 20km walk ===
The women's 20 kilometres walk was marked by controversy as the official distance was short of 20 kilometres. Kimberly García of Peru won the gold medal in the event originally in a time of 1:12.26, more than nine minutes below the world record. Organizers realized the course was short after the event had been completed. Athletes believed the course was approximately three kilometers short, with the winner Garcia noticing the distance and time were not matching after the first kilometre. Due to the error, the times were erased and athletes could not receive world ranking points towards the 2024 Summer Olympics in Paris, France. The organizing committee blamed the error on the Association of Panamerican Athletics and the person who they hired (Marcelo Ithurralde) to accurately measure the course. The executive director of the games, Harold Mayne-Nicholls later claimed the incident was an embarrassment.

== See also ==
- Athletics at the 2023 Parapan American Games
- Athletics at the 2024 Summer Olympics
