= Daniel Michalski (runner) =

American athlete (born 1995)

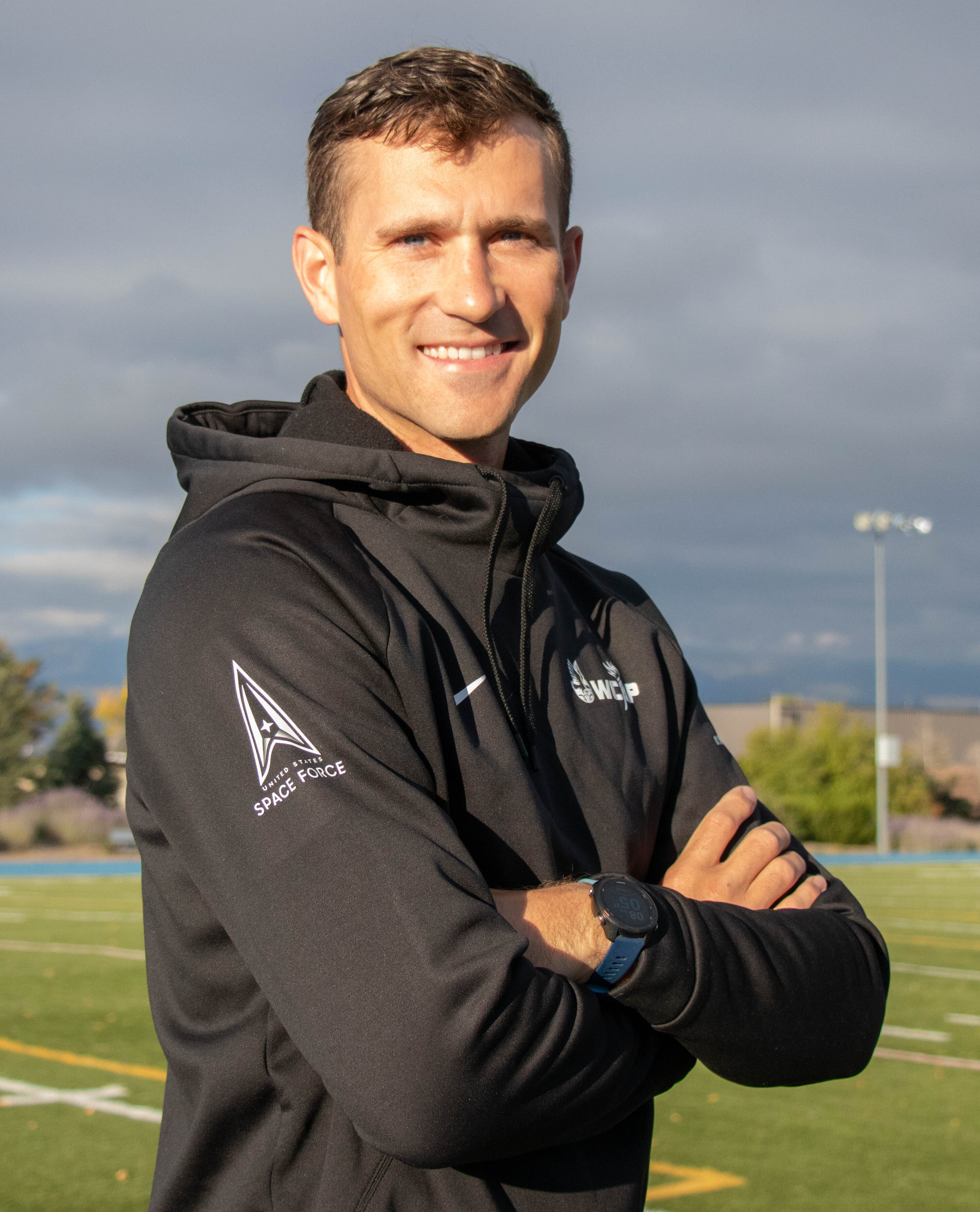
- Michalski in 2023

Personal information
- Born: September 10, 1995 (age 30) Chattanooga, Tennessee
- Home town: Xenia, Ohio

Sport
- Country: United States
- Sport: Track and field
- Event: 3000 metres steeplechase
- College team: Cedarville University, Indiana Hoosiers
Medal record
Representing United States
NACAC Championships
Gold medal – first place	2025 Freeport	3000 m steeplechase
Pan Am Games
Silver medal – second place	2023 Santiago	3000 m steeplechase

Daniel Michalski (born September 10, 1995) is an American runner who competes primarily in the 3000 metres steeplechase.

== Career ==
Michalski grew up in Xenia, Ohio and graduated from Cedarville University in Ohio, transferring to Indiana University Bloomington for his fifth year. He currently lives and trains in Colorado Springs, Colorado, where he is a member of the United States Air Force World Class Athlete Program. In 2023, he won the silver medal in the 3000 m steeplechase behind Canadian Jean-Simon Desgagnés at the Pan American Games in Santiago, Chile with a time of 8:36.47. In 2025, he finished 2nd in the 2025 US Outdoor Track & Field Championships, potentially qualifying for the 2025 World Athletics Championships. Michalski won the 2025 NACAC Championships with a time of 8:14.07, running under the qualifying standard for the World Championships and therefore solidifying his spot on the team. At the 2025 World Championships, Michalski qualified for the final from heat 3, finishing behind Soufiane El Bakkali and Lamecha Girma with a time of 8:28.76. In the final, Michalski took the lead with around 1000m to go, putting a gap on the field and maintaining his lead until the bell lap. The race ended up being won by Geordie Beamish with a time of 8:33.88, with Michalski finishing 9th in a time of 8:37.12.

== Personal bests ==
- Mile – 3:57.25 (Raleigh, NC 2022)
  - Mile indoor – 4:01.32 (Bloomington, IN 2019)
- 3000 m SC – 8:14.07 (Freeport, Bahamas 2025)
