= Juan Luis Barrios =

Mexican runner (born 1983)

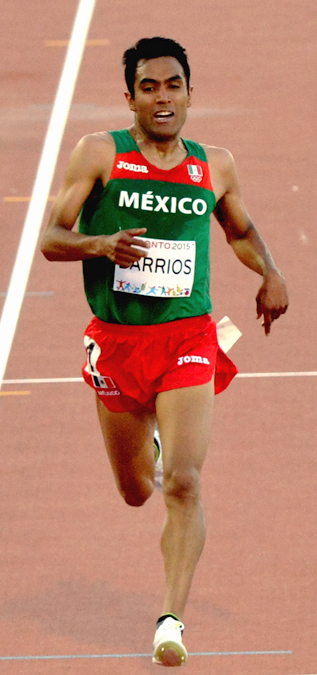
- Barrios at the 2015 Pan American Games

Personal information
- Full name: Juan Luis Barrios Nieves
- Born: June 24, 1983 (age 43) Mexico City, Mexico
- Height: 1.73 m (5 ft 8 in)
- Weight: 65 kg (143 lb)

Sport
- Sport: Athletics
- Event: 800 m – marathon
Medal record
Representing Mexico
Pan American Games
Gold medal – first place	2011 Guadalajara	5,000 m
Gold medal – first place	2015 Toronto	5,000 m
Silver medal – second place	2007 Rio de Janeiro	1500 m
Silver medal – second place	2007 Rio de Janeiro	5,000 m
Bronze medal – third place	2015 Toronto	10,000 m
Central American and Caribbean Games
Gold medal – first place	2002 San Salvador	1500 m
Gold medal – first place	2006 Cartagena	1500 m
Gold medal – first place	2006 Cartagena	5000 m
Gold medal – first place	2010 Mayagüez	1500 m
Gold medal – first place	2010 Mayagüez	5000 m
Gold medal – first place	2014 Xalapa	5000 m
Gold medal – first place	2014 Xalapa	10000 m
Gold medal – first place	2018 Barranquilla	10000 m
CAC Championships
Gold medal – first place	2013 Morelia	5000 m
- Updated on December 17, 2014

Juan Luis Barrios Nieves (born June 24, 1983) is a Mexican runner. He competed in the 5000 m at the 2008 and 2012 Olympics and finished seventh-eighth. He placed 14th in the same event at the 2007 and came 18th in the 10,000 metres at the 2009 World Championships.

He won silver medals in the 5000 m and 1500 metres at the 2007 Pan American Games. He has won three consecutive titles in the 1500 m at the Central American and Caribbean Games, winning in 2002, 2006 and 2010. He also has a threepeat in the 5000 m in 2006, 2010 and 2014, plus he added the 10,000 metres title in 2014. He has also won gold medals on the track at the Central American and Caribbean Championships.

Barrios was the inaugural winner of the NACAC Cross Country Championships in 2005 and repeated the feat the following year, in addition to taking the team gold with Mexico. He made his debut over the marathon distance in March 2011, running at the LALA International Marathon in Torreón, and recorded a time of 2:14:20 hours.

== Personal bests ==
=== Outdoor ===
- 800 m: 1:48.43 min A – Mexico City, Mexico, May 22, 2004
- 1500 m: 3:37.71 min – Rio de Janeiro, Brazil, July 25, 2007
- One mile: 3:57.34 min – Dublin, Ireland, July 17, 2013
- 3000m: 7:37.64 min – Rieti, Italy, August 27, 2006
- 5000m: 13:09.81 min – New York City, United States, June 11, 2011
- 10,000m: 27:28.82 min – Wageningen, Netherlands, May 30, 2012
- Half marathon: 1:00:40 hrs – Marugame, Japan, March 15, 2015
- Marathon: 02:10:55 hrs – Tokyo, Japan, February 25, 2018

== International competitions ==
Year	Competition	Venue	Position	Event	Notes
Representing Mexico
2000	Central American and Caribbean Junior Championships (U20)	San Juan, Puerto Rico	5th (h)	800m	1:58.95
2001	World Cross Country Championships (U20)	Ostend, Belgium	47th	7.7 km	27:53
2001	Central American and Caribbean Championships	Guatemala City, Guatemala	5th	800 m	1:49.54
2001	Central American and Caribbean Championships	Guatemala City, Guatemala	3rd	1500 m	3:47.62
2001	Pan American Junior Championships	Santa Fe, Argentina	2nd	800m	1:51.97
2001	Pan American Junior Championships	Santa Fe, Argentina	2nd	1500m	3:51.16
2001	Central American and Caribbean Cross Country Championships	Southampton, Bermuda	1st	7.6 km	25:03
2002	World Cross Country Championships (U20)	Dublin, Ireland	22nd	7.974 km	24:57
2002	Ibero-American Championships	Guatemala City, Guatemala	9th	800 m	1:50.98
2002	Ibero-American Championships	Guatemala City, Guatemala	6th	1500 m	3:50.87
2002	Central American and Caribbean Junior Championships (U-20)	Bridgetown, Barbados	2nd	800 m	1:52.36
2002	Central American and Caribbean Junior Championships (U-20)	Bridgetown, Barbados	1st	1500 m	3:45.20 CR
2002	World Junior Championships	Kingston, Jamaica	8th	1500m	3:44.97
2002	Central American and Caribbean Games	San Salvador, El Salvador	1st	1500 m	3:43.71
2003	Central American and Caribbean Championships	St. George's, Grenada	1st	1500 m	3:44.78
2003	Pan American Games	Santo Domingo, Dominican Republic	5th	1500m	3:47.67
2004	North American Men's Marathon Relay Championships	Akron, United States	1st	Marathon relay	2:05:35
2005	NACAC Cross Country Championships	Clermont, United States	1st	8 km	25:06
2005	World Cross Country Championships	Saint-Galmier, France	57th	4.196 km	12:35
2005	Central American and Caribbean Championships	Nassau, Bahamas	1st	5000 m	14:22.57
2006	NACAC Cross Country Championships	Clermont, United States	1st	8 km	25:17
2006	World Cross Country Championships	Fukuoka, Japan	62nd	4 km	11:37
2006	Central American and Caribbean Games	Cartagena, Colombia	1st	1500 m	3:42.52
2006	Central American and Caribbean Games	Cartagena, Colombia	1st	5000 m	14:09.08
2007	Pan American Games	Rio de Janeiro, Brazil	2nd	1500 m	3:37.88
2007	Pan American Games	Rio de Janeiro, Brazil	2nd	5000 m	13:30.87
2007	World Championships	Osaka, Japan	8th (sf)	1500m	3:41.17
2007	World Championships	Osaka, Japan	14th	5000m	13:59.86
2008	Olympic Games	Beijing, China	7th	5000m	13:19.79
2009	World Championships	Berlin, Germany	18th	10,000m	28:31.40
2010	World Cross Country Championships	Bydgoszcz, Poland	62nd	11.611 km	35:29
2010	World Cross Country Championships	Bydgoszcz, Poland	20th	11.611 km (Team)	391 pts
2010	Central American and Caribbean Games	Mayagüez, Puerto Rico	1st	1500 m	3:44.85
2010	Central American and Caribbean Games	Mayagüez, Puerto Rico	1st	5000 m	13:44.41
2011	Pan American Games	Guadalajara, Mexico	1st	5000 m	14:13.77
2012	World Indoor Championships	Istanbul, Turkey	10th (h)	3000 m	7:54.07
2012	Olympic Games	London, United Kingdom	8th	5000m	13:45.30
2013	Central American and Caribbean Championships	Morelia, Mexico	1st	5000 m	14:08.19
2013	World Championships	Moscow, Russia	—	10,000 m	DNF
2014	New York City Half Marathon	New York City, United States	4th	13.1 MI	1:01:46
2014	Ibero-American Championships	São Paulo, Brazil	1st	3000 m	7:59.50
2014	Pan American Sports Festival	Mexico City, Mexico	1st	5000 m	14:22.24 A
2014	Central American and Caribbean Games	Xalapa, Mexico	1st	5000 m	14:15.98
2014	Central American and Caribbean Games	Xalapa, Mexico	1st	10,000 m	29:13.63 A
2018	Central American and Caribbean Games	Barranquilla, Colombia	1st	10,000 m	30:07.49
2018	New York City Marathon	New York City, United States	11th	Marathon	2:13:55
2023	Central American and Caribbean Games	San Salvador, El Salvador	3rd	Half marathon	1:05:13
