= Ryan Smeeton =

Canadian steeplechase runner

Personal information
- Full name: Ryan Frederick Smeeton
- Born: 26 October 1998 (age 27)
- Home town: Calgary, Alberta
- Education: Oklahoma State University

Sport
- Country: Canada
- Sport: Track and field
- Event: 3000 metres steeplechase

Ryan Frederick Smeeton (born 26 October 1998) is a Canadian track and field athlete who specializes in the 3000 metres steeplechase. He has competed on two world teams; in the men's 3000 metres steeplechase at the World Athletics Championships held in Doha, Qatar and in the men's 3000 metres steeplechase at the World Athletics Championships held in Eugene, Oregon. He failed to qualify for either final.

In 2019, he competed in the men's 3000 metres steeplechase event at the Summer Universiade held in Naples, Italy. He also represented Canada at the 2019 Pan American Games held in Lima, Peru in the men's 3000 metres steeplechase event. He finished in 6th place.
