= Athletics at the 2007 Pan American Games – Men's 5000 metres =

Men's 5000 metres at the Pan American Games

The Men's 5,000 metres event at the 2007 Pan American Games took place on July 23, 2007, in the Estádio Olímpico João Havelange in Rio de Janeiro. USA's Ed Moran won the race, setting a new Pan Am Record.

== Medalists ==
| Gold | Ed Moran; United States |
| Silver | Juan Luis Barrios; Mexico |
| Bronze | Marílson Gomes dos Santos; Brazil |

== Records ==
| World Record | Kenenisa Bekele (ETH) | 12m37.35 | May 31, 2004 | Hengelo, Netherlands |
| Pan Am Record | Armando Quintanilla (MEX) | 13m30.35 | March 25, 1995 | Mar del Plata, Argentina |

== Results ==
| Rank | Athlete | Time | Note |
|---|---|---|---|
| Gold medal | Ed Moran (USA) | 13:25.60 | GR |
| Silver medal | Juan Luis Barrios (MEX) | 13:29.87 | |
| Bronze medal | Marílson Gomes dos Santos (BRA) | 13:30.68 | |
| 4 | José David Galván (MEX) | 13:38.31 | |
| 5 | Javier Carriqueo (ARG) | 13:52.36 | |
| 6 | Freddy González (VEN) | 13:52.79 | |
| 7 | William Naranjo (COL) | 13:56.45 | |
| 8 | Javier Guarín (COL) | 14:27.89 | |
| 9 | Ubiratan Santos (BRA) | 14:34.08 | |
| 10 | Eduardo Aruquipa (BOL) | 14:50.34 | |
| 11 | Cleveland Forde (GUY) | 15:19.48 | |
| 12 | Jorge César Fernández (BOL) | 15:36.57 | |
| 13 | Masai Jeffers (SKN) | 16:50.37 | |

== See also ==
- 2007 World Championships in Athletics – Men's 5000 metres
- Athletics at the 2008 Summer Olympics – Men's 5000 metres
