= Kasey Knevelbaard =

American runner (born 1996)

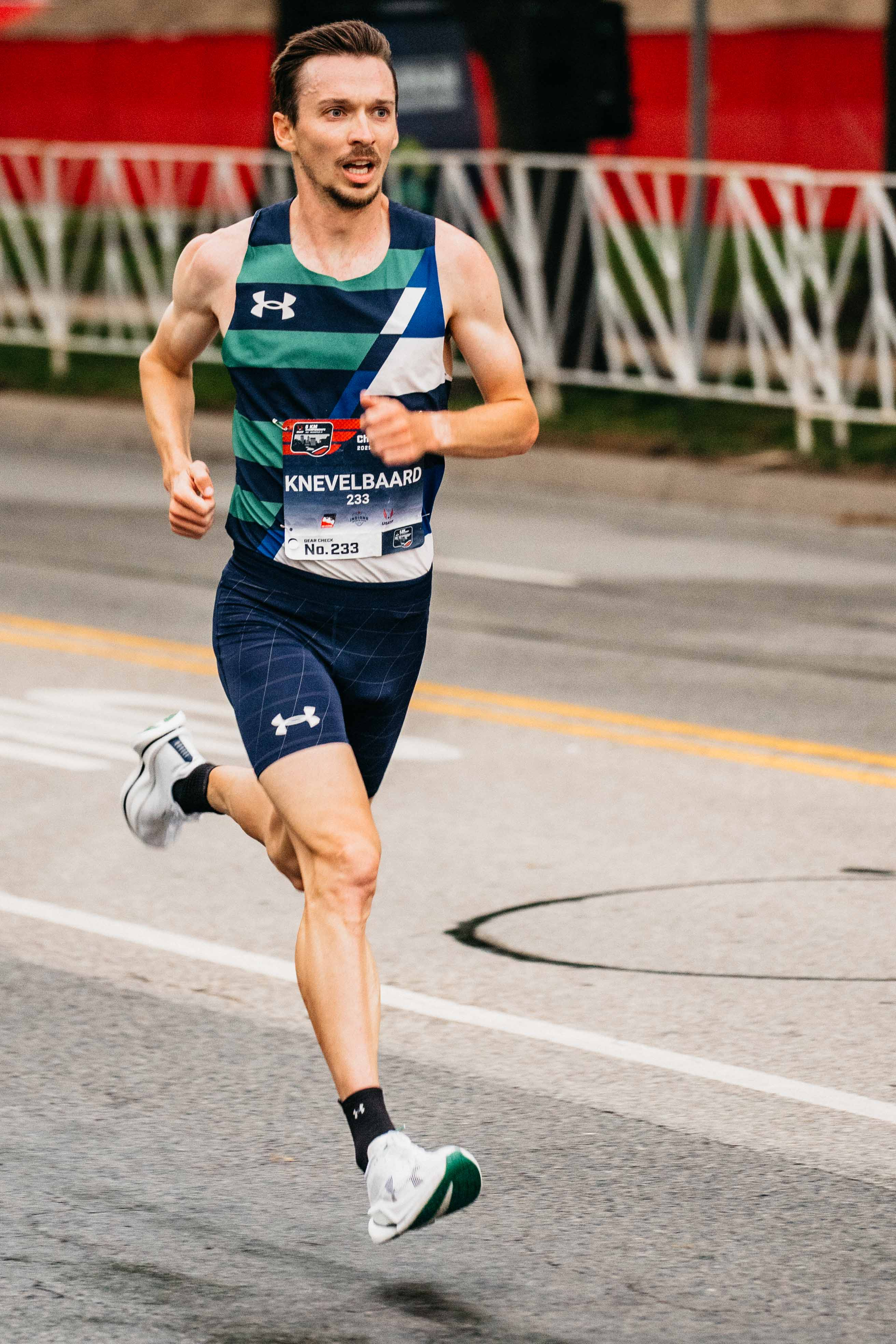
- Kasey Knevelbaard competing in the 2025 USATF 5k road championships in Indianapolis

Personal information
- Born: September 2, 1996 (age 30)
- Home town: Caruthers, California, U.S.
- Education: Immanuel High School

Sport
- Sport: Athletics
- Events: 800 metres, 1500 metres, mile, 3000 metres
- College team: Southern Utah University 2019, Florida State 2021
- Club: Under Armour
- Turned pro: 2021

Achievements and titles
- Highest world ranking: 67 (1500m)
Medal record
Men's athletics
Representing United States
Pan American Games
Gold medal – first place	2023 Santiago	5000 m

Kasey Knevelbaard (born September 2, 1996) is an American middle- and long-distance runner who competes for Under Armour. He competed collegiately for the Southern Utah Thunderbirds from 2015 through the spring of 2019, before becoming a graduate transfer to Florida State in the fall of 2019. He won the gold medal in the 5000 m at the 2023 Pan American Games.

After graduating from Florida State University's MS Sports Management program in 2021, Knevelbaard signed with Under Armour Dark Sky Distance in Flagstaff, Arizona.

== Personal bests ==
Outdoor

- 800 metres – 1:48.97 (Provo 2019)
- 1500 metres – 3:34.55 (Nice 2023)
- Mile – 3:53.64 (Raleigh, NC 2024)
- 5000 metres – 13:04.98 (Oordegem 2025)

Indoor

- 800 metres – 1:51.63 (Pocatello 2017)
- 1500 metres – 3:39.24 (Boston 2022)
- Mile – 3:55.92 (Boston 2023)
- 3000 metres – 7:49.28 (Fayetteville 2022)
- 5000 metres – 13:20.94 (Boston 2023)
