= Ed Moran =

American long-distance runner

Personal information
- Nationality: American
- Born: May 27, 1981 (age 45) Dayton section of South Brunswick, New Jersey, U.S.

Sport
- Sport: Track, long-distance running
- Events: 5000 meters, 10,000 meters, marathon
- College team: William & Mary

Achievements and titles
- Personal bests: 3000m: 7:47.86; 5000m: 13:20.25; 10,000m: 27:43.13; Marathon: 2:11:47
Medal record
Men's athletics
Representing United States
Pan American Games
Gold medal – first place	2007 Rio de Janeiro	5000 metres

Ed Moran (born May 27, 1981) is an American retired track and road runner who specialized in various long-distance disciplines. A gold medalist in the 5000-meter race at the 2007 Pan American Games, he would go on to represent the United States at two IAAF World Cross Country Championships in 2008 and 2009, before finishing the 2011 New York City Marathon in 9th place.

== Running career ==
=== High school ===
Moran moved to the Lawrenceville section of Lawrence Township, New Jersey at the age of 6 and attended Notre Dame High School, where he didn't take up running until his sophomore year. By his senior year of high school, Moran's personal bests were 4:19 (min:sec) in the mile and 9:26 for the 2-mile.

=== Collegiate ===
Moran ran and studied at the College of William & Mary, where he was a four-time All-American. In spite of being in a track team of prodigies like Sean Graham, Moran eventually became a standout in the 5000 metres. His collegiate career was riddled with serious injuries, and due to this it was not until his sixth year (after being granted extended eligibility by the NCAA) of studying while earning a master's degree that he exploded in the 5000 metres.

=== Post-collegiate ===
Moran was very close to deciding not to continue running after college. By the time he finished his undergrad studies in 2003, he was working on completing a master's degree in public policy and tried to focus on a career after college. He changed his mind after the 2005 USA Outdoor Track and Field Championships, where he ran 13:25.87 (min:sec) in the 5000 metres, 14 seconds better than his previous personal best. He subsequently signed a professional contract with Nike so that he could train full-time.

In 2007, Moran won the men's 5000 metres at the 2007 Pan American Games, and as of 2023 still holds the course record of the race. He was selected to run for the US at the 2008 IAAF World Cross Country Championships although he did not finish the race. Moran ran the same competition the following year, finishing the course at the 2009 IAAF World Cross Country Championships in 60th place of 137 finishers.

== Coaching ==
Moran coached at College of William & Mary from August 2005 – May 2011 where he helped develop individual training plans for distance runners. He mentored student-athletes on NCAA Division I nationally ranked cross country and track teams. Coach Ed was viewed by many of his athletes as a more skillful race day coach than his mentor, Mr. Gibby. He also recruited high school student-athletes nationwide. Moran performed administrative tasks including budgeting, equipment acquisition, fundraising, and travel logistics. He was in his seventh season on the William and Mary staff, and third as a volunteer after four years as a full-time assistant.
