= Manitoba Marathon =

Weekend of road running events

- Date: Father's Day
- Location: Winnipeg, Manitoba, Canada
- Event type: Road
- Distance: Marathon, marathon relay, half marathon, 10K run, 2.6 mile fun run
- Primary sponsor: Manitoba Liquor & Lotteries
- Established: 1979 (47 years ago)
- Course records: Marathon: Men: 2:13:53 (1981) (United States) Dennis Rinde; Women: 2:38:08 (1985) (United States) Janis Klecker; Half marathon: Men: 1:01:41 (2023) (Canada) Cameron Levins; Women: 1:11:06 (2019) (Canada) Malindi Elmore
- Website: Manitoba Marathon
- Participants: 655 (2019)

The Manitoba Marathon weekend consists of a marathon, half marathon, marathon relay, 10 km race, and 5 km fun run. The marathon was first run in the City of Winnipeg in 1979 and has generally been held annually on Father's Day since then. In 2019, about 10,000 runners in total participated over the weekend, including 655 who finished the marathon.

The half marathon is also being held as the Canadian Half Marathon Championships from 2019 to 2024.

The 2020 in-person edition of the race was cancelled due to the coronavirus pandemic. (Note: It had initially been postponed before being cancelled.) In 2022, the race was cancelled mid race due to dangerous heat levels. Participants in the five- and 10-kilometre races were allowed to complete their runs, but the half marathon, relay, 50 kilometer and full marathon were cancelled. Some runners did proceed to finish their race unofficially at their own risk.

The 2026 race saw a new record of 14,000 runners at the event.

== Marathon ==
The full marathon (42.195 km (26.219 mi)) runs through residential and downtown streets.

Year	Winner	Age	Time	Runner-up	Age	Time
1979	Wataru Sakamoto	22	2:17:31	Takeshima Katsumi	29	2:18:09
1980	Frank Richardson	25	2:15:15	Michael Dyon	24	2:17:09
1981	Dennis Rinde	22	2:13:51	Walter Saeger	28	2:18:31
1982	Dennis Rinde	23	2:20:13			
1983	Art Boileau	25	2:16:21	John Bolger	26	2:17:28
1984	Vito Basiliana	30	2:19:43	Iwase Tetsuji	29	2:24:43
1985	Dennis Rinde	26	2:18:01	Barney Klecker	33	2:21:57
1986	Steve Benson	34	2:17:38			
1987	Dennis Rinde	28	2:20:55			
1988	Dennis Rinde	29	2:22:50			
1989	Dennis Rinde	30	2:23:09			
1990	Roger Schwegel	37	2:20:52			
1991	Peter Maher	31	2:22:05			
1992	Art Boileau	34	2:25:46			
1993	Peter Maher	33	2:24:33			
1994	Peter Maher	34	2:23:17			
1995	Christopher Nicoll	-	2:40:42			
1996	Christopher Nicoll	-	2:26:11			
1997	Chris Glowach	-	2:28:56			
1998	Chris Glowach	-	2:30:44			
1999	Dane Samuel	32	2:33:54			
2000	Curtis Cox	32	2:30:53	Dallas Allaire	37	2:30:56
2001	David Robertson	39	2:27:56	Dallas Allaire	38	2:29:20
2002	Shingie Badza	25	2:32:04	Henry Klassen	30	2:37:01
2003	Shingirai Badza	29	2:37:55	Dennis Rinde	44	2:39:23
2004	Dane Samuel	37	2:31:27	Dimitry Melman	42	2:44:49
2005	Michael Booth	25	2:35:38	Darcy Ready	41	2:46:09
2006	Michael Booth	26	2:31:54	Dane Samuel	39	2:38:53
2007	Michael Booth	27	2:36:12	Travis Saunders	23	2:40:03
2008	John McEvoy	30	2:36:31	Greg Penner	30	2:37:43
2009	Hillary Cheruiyot	28	2:27:29	Philip Samoei	34	2:27:43
2010	Michael Booth	30	2:32:33	Jean-Paul Degagne	32	2:49:07
2011	Philip Samoei	35	2:35:45	Adam Aleshka	31	2:44:09
2012	Thomas Omwenga	33	2:25:13	Brian Walker	30	2:33:18
2013	Evans Maiko	31	2:28:17	Brian Walker	31	2:28:37
2014	Brian Walker	32	2:36:44	Bradley Keefe	33	2:39:29
2015	Thomas Omwenga	36	2:34:16	Bradley Keefe	33	2:36:53
2016	Bradley Keefe	-	2:43:30	Les Friesen	-	2:43:59
2017	Teresa Ferkensa	-	2:38:02	Jeremy Walker	-	2:39:07
2018	Corey Gallagher	-	2:37:47	Jeremy Walker	-	2:41:41
2019	David Mutai	-	2:27:09	Jason Acsota	-	2:36:03
2020	cancelled due to COVID-19 pandemic					
2021	Brian Walker	-	2:29:24	Thomas Sherwin	-	2:34:12
2022	RACE CANCELLED	-		NO OFFICIAL RESULTS	-	
2023	Roger Hopper	-	2:23:45	Steffan Reimer	-	2:32:26
2024	Andrew Taylor	-	2:32:51	Tyler Derksen	-	2:42:06
2025		-			-	
2026	Nageso Nyafaro Tuse	-	2:18:50		-	

== Half marathon ==
Year	Winner	Age	Time	Runner-up	Age	Time
2000	Michael Booth	20	1:09:43	Jason Loutitt	26	11:13:47
2001	Henry Klassen	30	1:11:53	Jason Loutitt	25	1:12:00
2002	Brook Jones	20	1:13:11	Jason Loutitt	26	1:13:12
2003	Frank Ackermann	33	1:17:37	Darcy Ready	39	1:17:40
2004	Jason Loutitt	28	1:09:49	Darcy Ready	40	1:14:51
2005	Daniel Narvey	20	1:15:54	Corey Gallagher	18	1:17:54
2006	Darcy Ready	42	1:15:36	Darren Klassen	37	1:16:34
2007	Brian Walker	25	1:11:44	Darcy Ready	43	1:11:47
2008	Desire Budigoma	19	1:12:22	Greg Miller	18	1:13:06
2009	Desire Budigoma	20	1:14:19	Dane Samuel	42	1:15:03
2010	Darcy Ready	46	1:14:19	Darren Klassen	41	1:14:21
2011	Brian Walker	29	1:11:58	Cory Gallagher	24	1:12:59
2012	Cory Gallagher	25	1:10:13	Jeremy Walker	30	1:13:46
2013	Cory Gallagher	26	1:10:50	Trevor Zimak	29	1:11:48
2014	Abduselam Yussuf	20	1:09:32	Trevor Zimak	30	1:10:52
2015	Abduselam Yussuf	-	1:05:05	Michael Middlemiss	-	1:11:42
2016	Abduselam Yussuf	-	1:08:23	Dawit Hagos	-	1:15:08
2017	Daniel Heschuk	-	1:09:46	Michael Middlemiss	-	1:12:30
2018	Abduselam Yussuf	-	1:08:30	Daniel Heschuk	-	1:08:30
2019	Tristan Woodfine	-	1:04:44	Thomas Toth	-	1:05:28
2020	cancelled due to COVID-19 pandemic					
2021	Daniel Heschuk	-	1:06:15	Simon Berube	-	1:08:26
2022	Cameron Levins	33	1:03:23	Ben Preisner	-	1:07:23
2023	Cameron Levins	34	1:01:41	Phil Parroy-Migas	30	1:06:15
2024	Cameron Levins	35	1:04:23	Thomas Nobbs	30	1:06:15

== Team relay ==
Year	Winner	Time	Runner-up	Time
2004	PKBW Group Elite	2:20:58	The Hockey Guys	2:57:07
2005	PKBW Group Elite	2:34:37	Mike's Maniacs	2:49:23
2006	Stride Ahead	2:28:08	PKBW Group Elite	2:31:36
2007	City Park Runners	2:29:43	2SG Fore Life	2:40:10
2008	SCAAM Elite	2:43:45	College Louis-Riel 1	2:46:03
2009	AMEC ALL STARS	2:43:40	Mr. Scott Wiebe	2:50:08
2010	Purple Pukpkin Eaters	2:18:56	Fantastic 5 - S's	2:20:17
2011	JP #1	2:25:14	Balls To the Wall	2:39:15
2012	Stride Ahead Sports	2:31:43	Wolfpack	2:44:11
2011	JP #1	2:25:14	Balls To the Wall	2:39:15
2012	Stride Ahead Sports	2:31:43	Wolfpack	2:44:11
2013	Stride Ahead	2:28:56	Wolfpack	2:29:07
2014	Stride Ahead	2:22:59	Wolfpack	2:31:58
2015	River City Elite	2:26:57	Hatch Powerhouse	2:51:45
2016	Bonniedoon Dairy Farm	2:54:3	Hatch Powerhouse	2:56:16
2017	The Boys of NP	2:42:58	Team Windburn	2:44:27
2018	Team Windburn	2:38:24	Legs Miserables	2:47:41
2019	Team Windburn	2:37:37	Weapon Factory	2:47:12
2020	Cancelled due to COVID			
2021	Team Windburn	2:47:20	Speed Walking Champions	2:48:35
2022	RACE CANCELLED	-	NO OFFICIAL RESULTS	-
2023	Arete Endurance	2:46:11	T RIOT Marathon	2:49:07
2024				

== Other races ==
- 10K Walk
- Super Run - a 2.6-mile (4.2 km) run.
- Mini Mites Fun Run - open to kids 5 years and under.
- Wheelchair Full Marathon
- Wheelchair Half Marathon
- Wheelchair 10K

== See also ==
- List of marathon races in North America
- Canadian Half Marathon Championships
- Athletics Canada
- Canadian records in track and field
- Sports in Canada
