= Canadian 10Km Road Race Championships =

Annual running championships in Canada

- Location: Canada
- Event type: Road
- Distance: 10km
- Primary sponsor: Tamarack
- Website: https://athletics.ca/championnat/championnats-canadiens-de-10-km-2020/ https://www.runottawa.ca/races-and-events/ottawa-10k

The Canadian 10 km Road Race Championships is the annual national championships for the 10K in Canada sanctioned by Athletics Canada.

The event is currently hosted as part of the Ottawa Race Weekend since 2015.

It was previously hosted by the Oasis Zoo Run in Toronto until 2014.

== Results ==
Brackets indicate # of times won.
Red indicates Canadian Record.
Pink indicates Record at Canadian Championships.
Gold indicates World Record.

Year	Race	Canadian Men's Winner	Overall Finish	Time	Canadian Women's Winner	Overall Finish	Time
2011	(Ontario) Toronto Oasis Zoo Run	(Ontario) Reid Coolsaet (1)	1	29:34	(Ontario) Dayna Pidhoresky	22	33:45
2012	(Ontario) Toronto Oasis Zoo Run	(Ontario) Reid Coolsaet (2)	1	30:24.7	(Ontario) Megan Brown	19	33:33.6
2013	(Ontario) Toronto Oasis Zoo Run	(Ontario) Reid Coolsaet (3)	1	29:50.1	(Ontario) Lanni Marchant (1)	24	34:07.2
2014	(Ontario) Toronto Oasis Zoo Run	(Nova Scotia) Eric Gillis (1)	1	29:52.6	(Ontario) Rachel Hannah	26	33:07.8
2015	(Ontario) Ottawa Race Weekend	(Nova Scotia) Eric Gillis (2)	7	28:57.2	(Ontario) Lanni Marchant (2)	22	31:48.2
2016	(Ontario) Ottawa Race Weekend	(Ontario) Reid Coolsaet (4)	8	30:19.0	(Ontario) Lanni Marchant (3)	35	33:25.9
2017	(Ontario) Ottawa Race Weekend	(Nova Scotia) Eric Gillis (3)	8	30:09.0	(British Columbia) Rachel Cliff (1)	41	33:34.3
2018	(Ontario) Ottawa Race Weekend	(Ontario) Evan Esselink	9	30:30.8	(British Columbia) Rachel Cliff (2)	28	32:22.7
2019	(Ontario) Ottawa Race Weekend	(Ontario) Dylan Wykes	6	29:55.5	(British Columbia) Natasha Wodak (1)	42	32:30.8
2020	Event canceled due to COVID-19 coronavirus pandemic						
2021	(Ontario) Toronto Waterfront Marathon	(Ontario) Ben Flanagan (1)	1	28:42.0	(British Columbia) Leslie Sexton	43	32:04.0
2022	(Ontario) Ottawa Race Weekend	(Ontario) Ben Flanagan (2)	1	28:39.5	(British Columbia) Natasha Wodak (2)	24	32:41.7
2023	(Ontario) Ottawa Race Weekend	(Ontario) Mohammed Ahmed	1	28:21.1	(British Columbia) Natasha Wodak (3)	32	32:51.1
2024	(Ontario) Ottawa Race Weekend	(Ontario) Ben Flanagan (3)	1	28:09	(British Columbia) Malindi Elmore	30	32:50
2025	(Ontario) Ottawa Race Weekend	(Quebec) Charles Philibert-Thiboutot	1	28:06	(Ontario) Gracelyn Larkin	56	32:43

== See also ==
- Athletics Canada
- Canadian records in track and field
- Canadian Track and Field Championships
- Canadian Marathon Championships
- Canadian Half Marathon Championships
- Canadian 5Km Road Race Championships
- Sports in Canada
