= Canadian 5Km Road Race Championships =

- Location: Canada
- Event type: Road running
- Distance: 5km
- Established: 2014

The Canadian 5km Road Race Championships is the annual national championships for the 5K in Canada sanctioned by Athletics Canada.

The inaugural event through 2018 was held by Bang & Olufsen Yorkville Run in Toronto. It took a hiatus for 2019 before moving to the Medavie Moncton Running Festival.

== Results ==
Brackets indicate # of times won.
Red indicates Canadian Record.
Pink indicates Record at Canadian Championships.
Gold indicates World Record.

Year	Race	Canadian Men's Winner	Overall Finish	Time	Canadian Women's Winner	Overall Finish	Time
2014	(Ontario) Bang & Olufsen Yorkville Run - Toronto	(Quebec) Pier-Olivier Laflamme	1	14:34.0	(Alberta) Jessica O'Connell	20	15:53.4
2015	(Ontario) Bang & Olufsen Yorkville Run - Toronto	(Ontario) Matthew Hughes	1	14:16.2	(British Columbia) Natasha Wodak	19	15:57.1
2016	(Ontario) Bang & Olufsen Yorkville Run - Toronto	(Quebec) Charles Philibert-Thiboutot	1	14:03	(Ontario) Andrea Seccafien	26	16:08.2
2017	(Ontario) Bang & Olufsen Yorkville Run - Toronto	(British Columbia) Cameron Levins	1	14:20	(Ontario) Andrea Seccafien	17	15:49.9
2018	(Ontario) Bang & Olufsen Yorkville Run - Toronto	(Ontario) Ben Flanagan		13:56	(British Columbia) Natasha Wodak		15:58
2019	Hiatus						
2020	(New Brunswick) Medavie Moncton Running Festival	Event canceled due to COVID-19 pandemic					
2021 (Virtual)	(New Brunswick) Medavie Moncton Running Festival						
2022	(New Brunswick) Medavie Moncton Running Festival	(Ontario) Ben Flanagan		13:38	(Ontario) Julie-Anne Staehli		15:55

== See also ==
- Athletics Canada
- Canadian records in track and field
- Canadian Track and Field Championships
- Canadian Marathon Championships
- Canadian Half Marathon Championships
- Canadian 10Km Road Race Championships
- Sports in Canada
