= 2013 Canadian Track and Field Championships =

- Dates: 20–23 June 2013
- Host city: Moncton, Canada
- Venue: Moncton Stadium
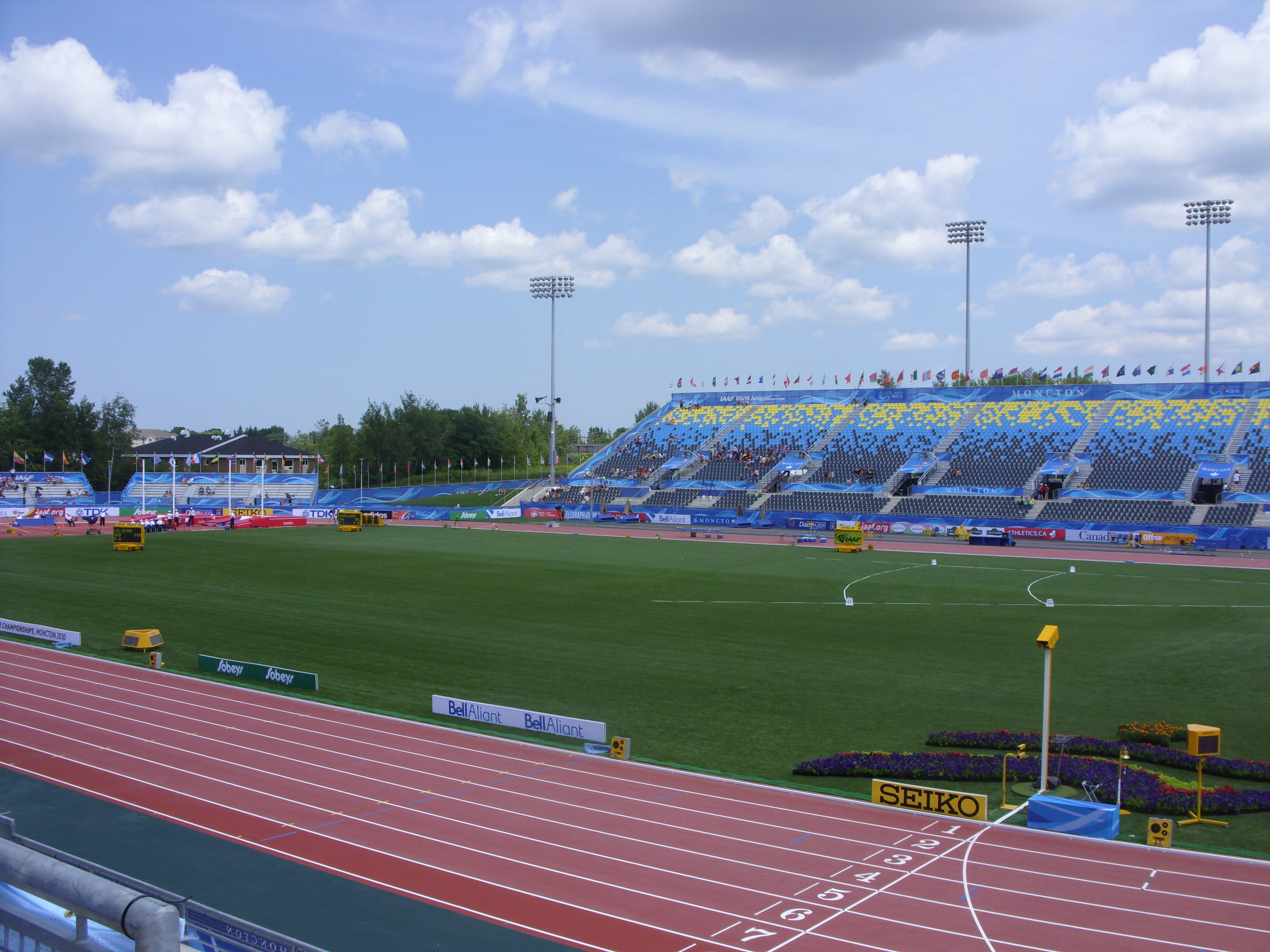

The 2013 Canadian Track and Field Championships was the year's national championship in outdoor track and field for Canada. It was held from 20 to 23 June at Moncton Stadium in Moncton, New Brunswick. It served as the selection meeting for the 2013 World Championships in Athletics.

== Results ==
=== Men ===
Event	Gold		Silver		Bronze	
100 metres	Aaron Brown	10.25	Sam Effah	10.33	Gavin Smellie	10.35
200 metres	Tremaine Harris	21.18	Jared Connaughton	21.33	Oluwasegun Makinde	21.33
400 metres	Philip Osei	46.47	Ben Ayesu-Attah	47.20	Michael Robertson	47.30
800 metres	Geoffrey Harris	1:47.75	Anthony Romaniw	1:48.38	Nathan Brannen	1:48.64
1500 metres	Nathan Brannen	3:51.10	Jeremy Rae	3:51.59	Adam Palamar	3:52.52
5000 metres	Cameron Levins	14:11.63	Andrew Nixon	14:13.61	Aaron Henrikx	14:13.63
10,000 metres	Mohammed Ahmed	29:22.04	Brandon Lord	29:22.97	Kelly Wiebe	30:36.84 PB
110 m hurdles	Ingvar Moseley	14.01	Sekou Kaba	14.03	Matthew Brisson	14.18
400 m hurdles	Tait Nystuen	51.36	Gabriel El Hanbli	52.12	Saj Alhaddad	52.39
3000 m s'chase	Matt Hughes	8:29.50	Chris Winter	8:32.00	Alexandre Genest	8:32.08
10 km walk	Iñaki Gómez	40:01 PB	Evan Dunfee	40:19 PB	Benjamin Thorne	41:07 PB
High jump	Derek Drouin	2.31 m	Michael Mason	2.28 m	Jeremy Eckert	2.19 m PB
Pole vault	Shawnacy Barber	5.40 m	Jason Wurster	5.30 m	David Foley	5.15 m
Long jump	Taylor Stewart	7.76 m	Patrick Massok	7.66 m	Robert Gallagher	7.62 m PB
Triple jump	Kurt McCormack	14.48 m	Brett Myketyn	13.51 m	Dahn Pratt	13.33 m
Shot put	Tim Nedow	20.72 m	Dylan Armstrong	20.48 m	Justin Rodhe	19.61 m
Discus throw	Tim Nedow	55.35 m	Brent Roubos	53.17 m	Greg Pilling	53.06 m
Hammer throw	Jim Steacy	72.96 m	Daniel Novia	64.85 m	Matthew Doherty	64.41 m
Javelin throw	Kyle Nielsen	76.23 m	Curtis Moss	75.99 m	Caleb Jones	73.92 m PB
Decathlon	Damian Warner	8145 pts	Patrick Arbour	7252 pts	James Turner	7141 pts PB

=== Women ===
Event	Gold		Silver		Bronze	
100 metres	Crystal Emmanuel	11.48	Kimberly Hyacinthe	11.55	Shai Davis	11.61
200 metres	Kimberly Hyacinthe	22.91	Crystal Emmanuel	23.03	Amonn Nelson	23.84
400 metres	Alicia Brown	52.92	Jenna Martin	52.97	Adrienne Power	54.68
800 metres	Melissa Bishop	2:02.84	Karine Belleau-Béliveau	2:03.14	Diane Cummins	2:03.54
1500 metres	Kate Van Buskirk	4:16.45	Nicole Sifuentes	4:16.84	Sheila Reid	4:17.11
5000 metres	Andrea Seccafien	16:25.30	Rhiannon Johns	16:26.71	Kate Harrison	16:28.38
10,000 metres	Natasha Wodak	33:21.43	Leslie Sexton	34:50.17 PB	Only two entrants	
100 m hurdles	Angela Whyte	12.90	Jessica Zelinka	13.13	Christie Gordon	13.38
400 m hurdles	Noelle Montcalm	56.43	Christine Lowe	59.05	Kate Bickle	1:00.48 PB
3000 m s'chase	Jessica Furlan	9:59.62	Chantelle Groenewoud	10:01.43	Julie-Anne Staelhi	10:20.45 PB
High jump	Michelle Kinsella	1.83 m	Jillian Drouin	1.83 m	Emma Kimoto	1.80 m
Pole vault	Heather Hamilton	4.20 m	Gabriella Duclos-Lasnier	4.10 m	Alysha Newman Lindsey Bergevin	4.00 m
Long jump	Christabel Nettey	6.49 m	Magali Roche	5.97 m PB	Sabrina Nettey	5.96 m
Triple jump	Patricia Sylvester (GRN)	13.39 m	Caroline Ehrhardt	12.71 m	Alicia Smith	12.67 m w
Shot put	Julie Labonté	17.61 m	Chelsea Whalen	16.20 m	Taryn Suttie	15.71 m
Discus throw	Julie Labonté	52.81 m	Rayann Chin	48.50 m	Marie-Josée LeJour	47.34 m
Hammer throw	Sultana Frizell	68.23 m	Heather Steacy	64.39 m	Megann Rodhe	61.23 m
Javelin throw	Krista Woodward	58.59 m	Chelsea Whalen	51.15 m PB	Alanna Kovacs	51.02 m
Heptathlon	Brianne Theisen-Eaton	6233 pts	Rachael McIntosh	5519 pts	Madelaine Buttinger	5443 pts
