= Canadian Marathon Championships =

Annual marathon championship

- Location: Canada
- Event type: Road running
- Distance: Marathon

The Canadian Marathon Championships is the annual national championships for the marathon in Canada. The event is currently part of the Toronto Waterfront Marathon. The event was held in Ottawa beginning with its inception in 2000 before moving to Toronto in 2015.

At the 2018 championship, Cameron Levins broke the Canadian marathon record in the Toronto Waterfront Marathon by 44 seconds with a time of 2:09:25, beating the 43 years record by Jerome Drayton of 2:10:09 in 1975.

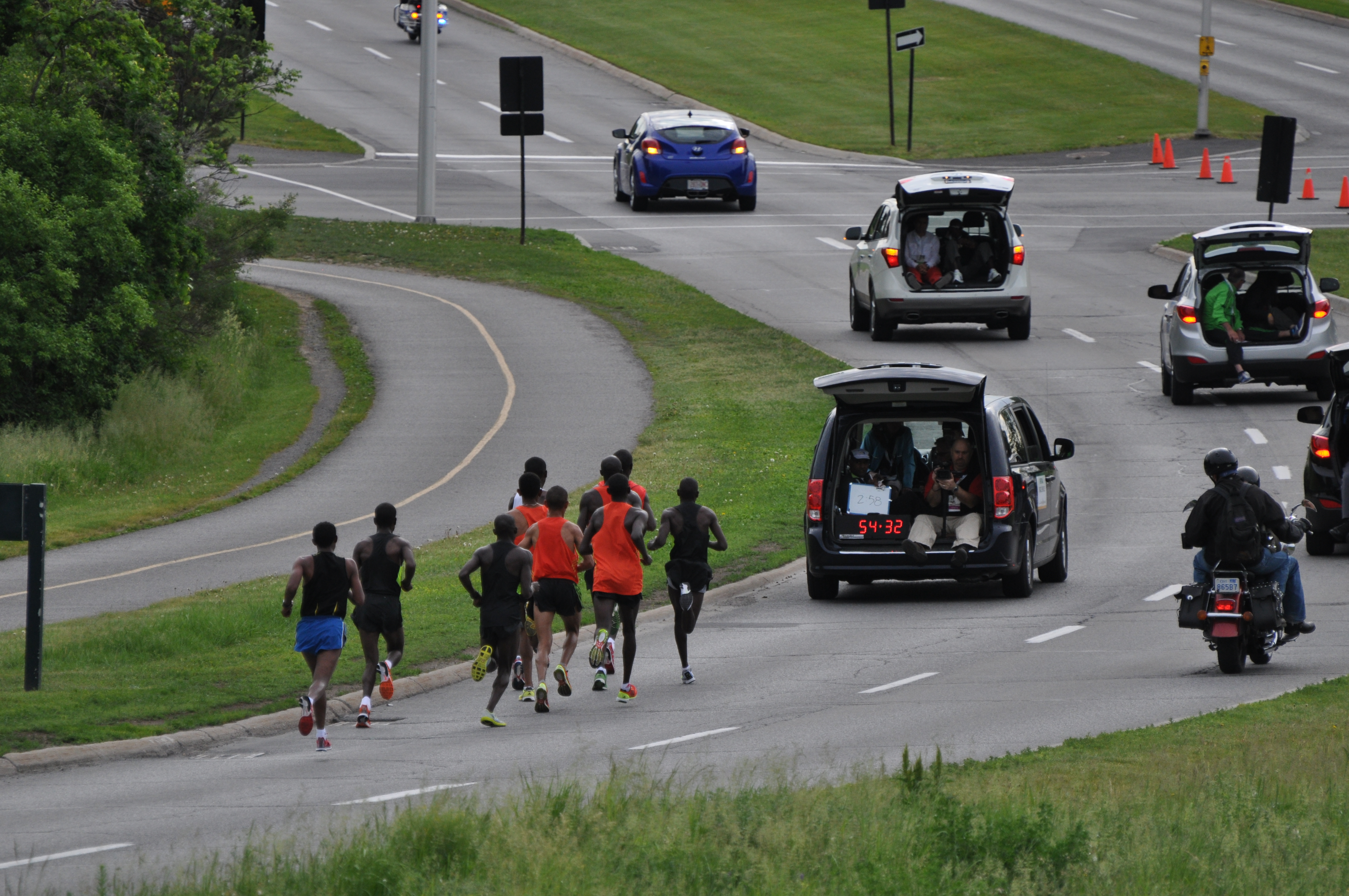
2012 lead group.

== Results ==
Year	Race	Canadian Men's Winner	Overall Finish	Time	Canadian Women's Winner	Overall Finish	Time
2014	(Ontario) Ottawa Marathon	(Nova Scotia) Eric Gillis (1)	8	2:13:47	(Ontario) Rhiannon Johns	48	2:47:11
2015	(Ontario) Toronto Waterfront Marathon	(Nova Scotia) Eric Gillis (2)	7	2:11:30.6	(Ontario) Lanni Marchant	26	2:28:08.9
2016	(Ontario) Toronto Waterfront Marathon	(Nova Scotia) Eric Gillis (3)	5	2:13:42.6	(Ontario) Krista DuChene	22	2:33:59.4
2017	(Ontario) Toronto Waterfront Marathon	(Alberta) Trevor Hofbauer (1)	9	2:18:05.1	(Ontario) Leslie Sexton	30	2:35:43.3
2018	(Ontario) Toronto Waterfront Marathon	(British Columbia) Cameron Levins	4	2:09:24.9	(British Columbia) Kinsey Middleton	31	2:32:09.0
2019	(Ontario) Toronto Waterfront Marathon	(Alberta) Trevor Hofbauer (2)	7	2:09:51.0	(Ontario) Dayna Pidhoresky	51	2:29:03.0
2020	(Ontario) Toronto Waterfront Marathon						

Brackets indicate # of times won.
Red indicates Canadian Record.
Pink indicates Record at Canadian Championships.
Silver indicates Olympic Qualifying.
Gold indicates World Record.

== See also ==
- Athletics Canada
- Canadian records in track and field
- Canadian Track and Field Championships
- Canadian Half Marathon Championships
- Canadian 10Km Road Race Championships
- Canadian 5Km Road Race Championships
- Sports in Canada
- Marathons at the World Championships in Athletics
- IAAF World Marathon Cup
