= Canadian Half Marathon Championships =

Annual running championship in Canada

- Location: Canada
- Event type: Road
- Distance: Half Marathon
- Website: https://manitobamarathon.mb.ca/marathon/half-marathon/

The Canadian Half Marathon Championships is the annual national championships for the half marathon in Canada sanctioned by Athletics Canada.

The event is currently hosted by Edmonton Marathon weekend, which began hosting the race in 2025. The Manitoba Marathon weekend was awarded hosting duties from 2019 through 2024. Before that, the championships were previously hosted by the Calgary Marathon weekend and the Banque Scotia 21K de Montréal.

Eric Gillis and Cameron Levins are tied for the most championship wins with 3.

== Results (2012 - present) ==
Brackets indicate # of times won.
Red indicates Canadian Record.

Full table of historical results can be found here.

Year	Race	Canadian Men's Winner	Overall Finish	Time	Canadian Women's Winner	Overall Finish	Time
2012	(Quebec) Banque Scotia 21K de Montréal	(Nova Scotia) Eric Gillis	1	1:04:38	Kate Bazeley		1:16:34
2013	(Quebec) Banque Scotia 21K de Montréal	(Nova Scotia) Eric Gillis (2)	1	1:05:56	(Ontario) Krista DuChene	12	1:12:27
2014	(Quebec) Banque Scotia 21K de Montréal	(Nova Scotia) Eric Gillis (3)	1	1:04:27	(Ontario) Rachel Hannah	19	1:13:36
2015	(Alberta) Calgary Half Marathon	(Alberta) Kip Kangogo	1	1:06:39	(Ontario) Lanni Marchant	15	1:12:17
2016	(Alberta) Calgary Half Marathon	(Ontario) Thomas Toth	1	1:07:27	(Alberta) Emily Setlack	12	1:15:45
2017	(Alberta) Calgary Half Marathon	(Alberta) Kip Kangogo (2)	1	1:06:26	(Ontario) Rachel Hannah	16	1:17:14
2018	(Alberta) Calgary Half Marathon	(Alberta) Trevor Hofbauer	1	1:08:25	(Ontario) Catrin Jones	7	1:14:19
2019	Manitoba Half Marathon	(Ontario) Tristan Woodfine	1	1:04:44	(British Columbia) Malindi Elmore	7	1:11:06
2020	Manitoba Half Marathon	cancelled due to COVID-19 pandemic					
2021	Manitoba Half Marathon	cancelled due to COVID-19 pandemic					
2022	Manitoba Half Marathon	(British Columbia) Cameron Levins	1	1:03:23	(British Columbia) Natasha Wodak	11	1:15:20
2023	Manitoba Half Marathon	(British Columbia) Cameron Levins (2)	1	1:01:41	(Quebec) Elissa Legault	7	1:12:15
2024	Manitoba Half Marathon	(British Columbia) Cameron Levins (3)	1	1:04:23	(British Columbia) Natasha Wodak (2)	8	1:12:56
2025	(Alberta) Edmonton Half Marathon	(Alberta) Rory Linkletter	1	1:03:00	(British Columbia) Lauren McNeil	11	1:11:25

== See also ==
- Athletics Canada
- Canadian records in track and field
- Canadian Track and Field Championships
- Canadian Marathon Championships
- Canadian 10Km Road Race Championships
- Canadian 5Km Road Race Championships
- Sports in Canada
