= Rob Watson (athlete) =

Canadian long-distance runner

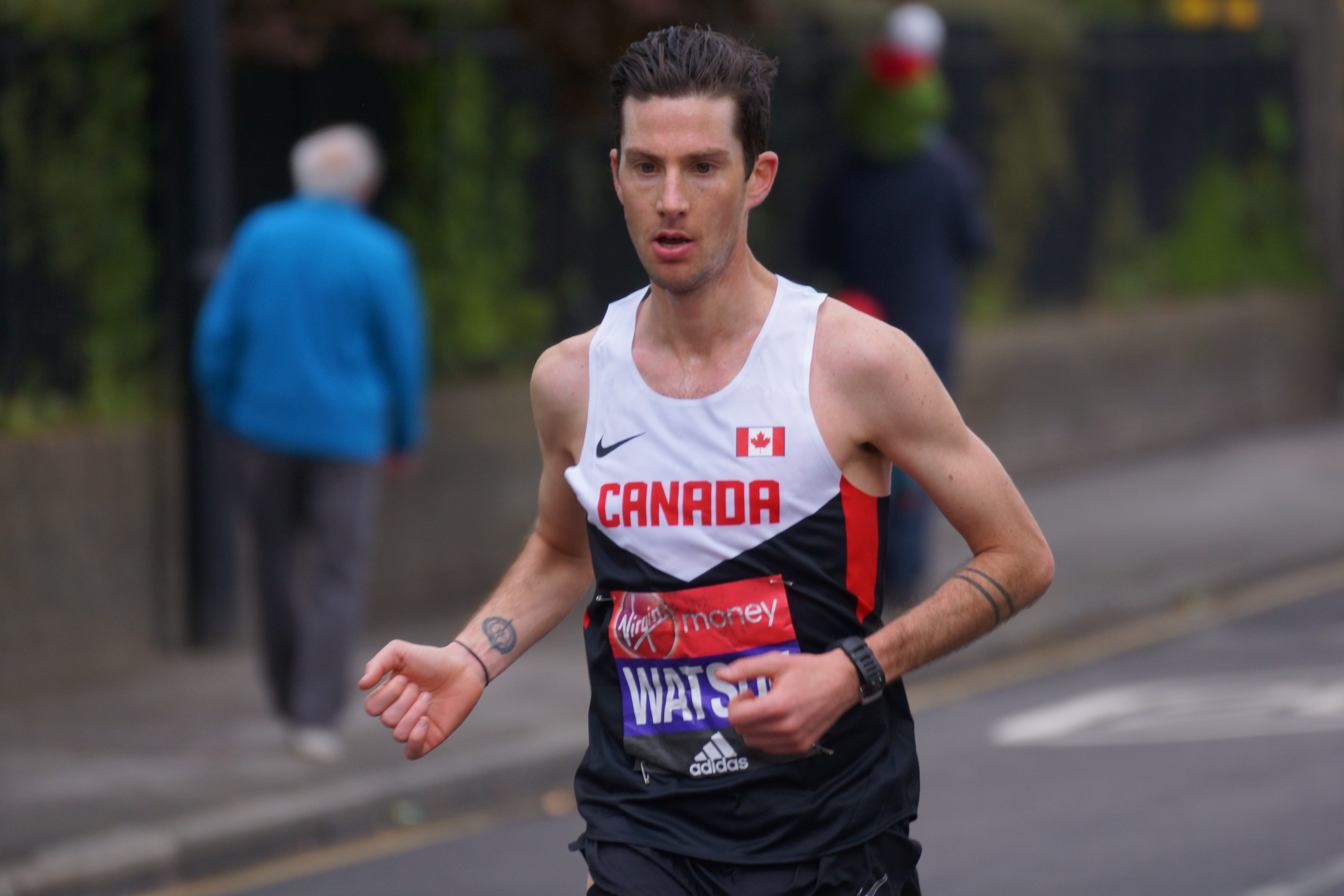
- Watson in 2016

Personal information
- Citizenship: Canadian
- Born: Robin Watson; June 23, 1983 (age 43) London, Ontario
- Occupation: Runner
- Website: www.leblogdurob2.com

Sport
- Club: Mile2Marathon
- Coached by: Pete Watson

Achievements and titles
- World finals: 2013 World Championships in Athletics (Marathon) 20th
- National finals: 2013 Canadian Marathon Championships: 1st; 2014 Canadian Marathon Championships: 2nd; 2012 Canadian 10k Championships: 2nd; 2010 Canadian 10k Championships: 1st; 2010 Canadian Track and Field Championships: 3000m Steeplechase; 2nd; 2009 Canadian Track and Field Championships: 3000m Steeplechase; 1st; 2008 Canadian Track and Field Championships: 3000m Steeplechase; 1st; 2008 Canadian Cross Country Championships: 10k; 2nd
- Personal bests: 5000m: 13:40; 5k: 14:0600; 8k: 23:50:00; 10k: 29:27:00; Half Marathon: 1:03:22.00; Marathon: 2:13:29.00; 1500m: 3:46:20; Mile: 4:07.26; 3000m: 7:59.12; 5000m: 13:40.84; 3000m Steeplechase: 8:27.87
- Updated on 16 December 2014

Robin "Rob" Watson (born 23 June 1983) is a Canadian long-distance runner. He is a two-time Canadian national champion in the 3000 metres steeplechase. He has won the Canadian Marathon Championships, the Canadian 10k Championships (twice) and placed 2nd in the Canadian Cross Country Championships.

== Career ==
The fourth of five boys. Robin Watson grew up in the Old South neighbourhood in London, Ontario. His parents were recreational runners; his mother ran track, his father marathons. His oldest brother Pete has been his greatest influence. Wanting to run like him, Watson entered a 10k race with him at age six. His endurance, and help from his brother, made him a top steeplechaser by the end of high school. He accepted a scholarship at West Virginia University where his brother Pete attended running in the National Collegiate Athletic Association (NCAA). After a year that saw WVU cutting its track program, Watson followed his brother to Colorado and began running track and cross- country for coach Bryan Berryhill at Colorado State University.

He got a call from coach Dave Scott-Thomas, and on graduating moved to Guelph, Ontario, to train for the 2009 International Association of Athletics Federations (IAAF) world championships in Berlin. After a disappointing finish, Watson and his coach discussed him running the marathon. After struggling for success, Watson turned to his brother Pete who was coaching in North Carolina.

He entered the 2012 marathon in Rotterdam but ran a 2:13:37 race and failed to qualify for financial support from Athletics Canada. In summer 2012, Watson moved to Vancouver, British Columbia. Watson subsequently finished first in the 2013 Canadian Marathon Championships and second in the 2014 Canadian Marathon Championships.

Watson has coached at Mile2 Marathons for more than ten years.

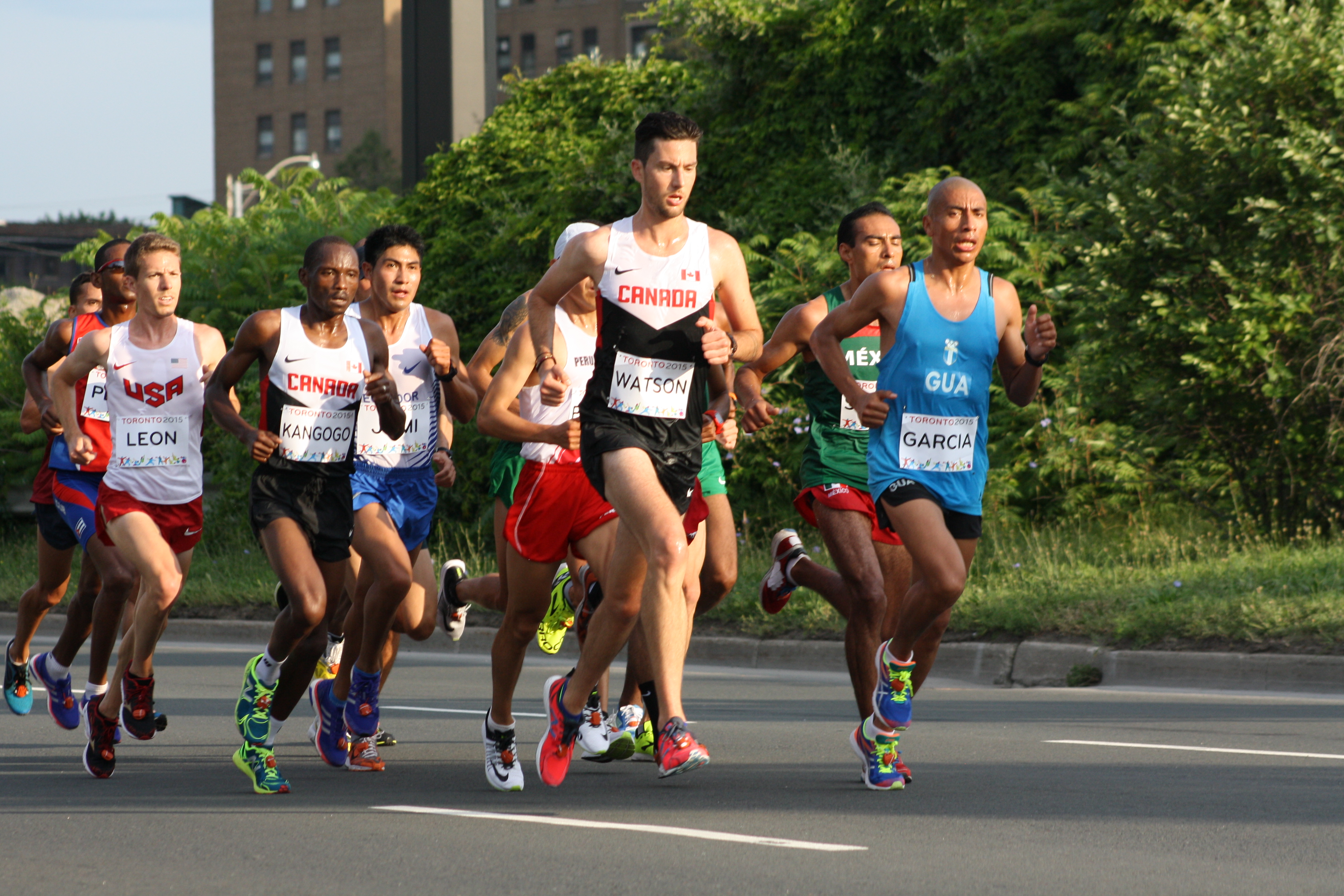
Watson at the 2015 Pan American Games marathon.

== Profile ==
Discipline	Performance	Location	Date
Marathon Outdoor	2:27:38	Vancouver, CAN	6 May 2018
10 Kilometres	30:01*	Vancouver, CAN	22 April 2018
5 Kilometres	14:41	Vancouver, CAN	17 Mar 2018
Half Marathon Outdoor	:08:44	Victoria, CAN	8 October 2017
Marathon Outdoor	2:18:45	London, GBR	24 April 2016
10 Miles Road	52:35	Edinburgh, GBR	17 April 2016
Half Marathon Outdoor	1:03.58	Houston, TX, USA	17 January 2016
8 Kilometres Outdoor	23:47	Saanichton, CAN	10 January 2016
10 Miles Road	49:07	Hamilton, CAN	26 December 2015
Marathon Outdoor	2:16:38	Chicago, IL, USA	11 October 2015
Half Marathon Outdoor	1:04:48	Vancouver, CAN	3 May 2015
10,000 Metres	29:27.66	Charlottesville, VA, USA	18 April 2015
10 Miles Road	49:02	Hamilton, CAN	26 December 2014
Marathon Outdoor	2:16:38	Ottawa, CAN	25 May 2014
Half Marathon	1:05:03	Tempe, AZ, USA	19 January 2014
Marathon Outdoor	2:13.29	Toronto, CAN	20 October 2013
10 Kilometres Outdoor	30:46	Toronto, CAN	21 September 2013
10 Miles Road	49:49	Lynchburg, VA, USA	28 September 2003
Half Marathon Outdoor	1:03:22	New York, NY, USA	17 March 2013
10 Kilometres Outdoor	30:36	Toronto, CAN	22 September 2012
10 Kilometres Outdoor	30:24	Toronto, CAN	24 September 2011
Marathon Outdoor	2:13:37	Rotterdam, NED	15 April 2012
Half Marathon Outdoor	1:04:20	Vancouver, CAN	26 June 2011
Marathon Outdoor	2:16:17	Houston, TX, USA	30 January 2011
10 Miles Road	48:39	Hamilton, CAN	26 December 2010
10 Kilometres Outdoor	30:03	Toronto, CAN	16 October 2010
One Mile	4:07.26	Guelph, CAN	5 June 2010
3000 Metres	8:11.12	London, CAN	2 June 2010
3000 Metres Steeplechase Outdoor	8:39.30	Palo Alto, CA, USA	1 May 2010
2000 Metres Steeplechase Outdoor	5:44.14	Ypsilanti, USA	16 April 2010
5000 Metres Outdoors	14:06.84	Berkeley, CA, USA	23 April 2010
2000 Metres Steeplechase	5:44.14	Ypsilanti, USA	16 April 2010
5 Kilometres Outdoors	14:41	Vancouver, CAN	17 March 2010
3000 Metres Steeplechase Outdoor	8:27.09	Eugene, OR, USA	7 June 2009
1500 Metres	3:46.55	Windsor, CAN	16 May 2009
5000 Metres Outdoors	13:40.33	Walnut, USA	17 Apr 2009
1500 Metres	3:47.95	Brasschaat (BEL)	23 JUL 2008
3000 Metres Steeplechase Outdoor	8:38.72	Walnut, CA, USA	18 April 2008
5000 Metres Outdoors	14:22.36	San Diego, CA, USA	12 May 2007
3000 Metres Steeplechase Outdoor	8:38.92	Eugene, OR, USA	20 April 2007
3000 Metres	8:13.97	Tempe, AZ, USA	14 April 2007
5000 Metres Indoor	15:00:10	Albuquerque, NM, USA	23 February 2007
3000 Metres Indoor	8:18.70	Lincoln, NE, USA	20 January 2007
3000 Metres Steeplechase Outdoor	8:47.96	Palo Alto, CA, USA	31 March 2006
5000 Metres	14:44.83	Albuquerque, NM, USA	24 February 2006
3000 Metres Indoor	8:13.21	Nampa, ID, USA	11 February 2006
3000 Metres Steeplechase Outdoor	9:02.73	Berkeley, CA, USA	8 April 2005
3000 Metres Steeplechase Outdoor	9:07.42	Princeton, NJ, USA	8 April 2005
3000 Metres Indoor	8:30.78	Fayetteville, AR, USA	12 February 2005

Legend:

- Not Legal
