= AC Indoor Open =

- Sport: Track and field
- Founded: 2013
- Country: Canada
- Website: https://athletics.ca/events/2022-canadian-indoor-track-field-championships/

The AC Indoor Open is an annual indoor track and field competition organized by Athletics Canada. It consists of the Canadian youth and junior national championships and an international open for senior athletes. The inaugural event was held at the Complexe sportif Claude-Robillard in Montreal. The 2022 edition will take place in Saint John, New Brunswick.

== See also ==
- Athletics Canada
- Sports in Canada
- Canadian records in track and field
- Canadian Track and Field Championships
- Canadian Marathon Championships
- Canadian Half Marathon Championships
