= Tristan Woodfine =

Canadian long-distance runner (born 1993)

Personal information
- Born: June 18, 1993 (age 33) Cobden, Ontario, Canada
- Education: University of Guelph
- Height: 5 ft 11 in (180 cm)
- Weight: 140 lb (64 kg; 10 st 0 lb)

Sport
- Event: Marathon
- University team: Guelph Gryphons

Achievements and titles
- Personal bests: Half marathon: 1:02:40 (Boston 2023); Marathon: 2:10:39 (Houston 2024)

Tristan Woodfine (born 18 June 1993) is a Canadian long-distance runner who holds a marathon personal best of 2:10:39, set at the 2024 Houston Marathon.

== Athletics career ==
Woodfine began his sporting career as a triathlete at the age of 14. He represented Canada at the 2011 World Junior Championships in Beijing, finishing in 22nd.

From 2013 to 2015, Woodfine competed for the Guelph Gryphons cross country and track and field teams. In fall 2013, he placed second behind Aaron Hendrix at the CIS Cross Country Championships in London. In March 2014, he represented Canada at the World University Cross Country Championships in Entebbe, Uganda, placing seventh as the top Canadian. In 2014, he once again place second at the CIS Cross Country Championships, this time behind Ross Proudfoot.

=== Marathoning ===
On April 12, 2015, Woodfine made his marathon debut in Rotterdam, running a time of 2:27:55. He wouldn't run another marathon until May 2018 at the Ottawa Marathon. There he would finish 10th as the top Canadian in a personal best of 2:18:55.

In January 2019, he ran a three-and-a-half minute personal best at the Houston Marathon, placing 10th in 2:15:19. In June, he won the Canadian Half Marathon Championships in Winnipeg, finishing in a personal best of 1:04:46. In October, he competed at the Canadian Olympic Marathon Trials held at the Toronto Waterfront Marathon. He would finish as 11th overall and as the second Canadian in 2:13:16, only behind Trevor Hofbauer and in front of Canadian record holder Cam Levins.

==== Appeal of Olympic Marathon Selection ====
Competing at the elite-only 2020 London Marathon, held on October 4, Woodfine ran a lifetime best of 2:10:51, running under the Tokyo Olympic qualifying standard of 2:11:30. Despite hitting the standard, Woodfine would not be selected by Athletics Canada (AC) to represent Canada at the 2020 Olympics, left off the team in favour of Trevor Hofbauer, Cam Levins, and Ben Preisner. Just four days after decision AC's marathon team announcement on June 4, 2021, Woodfine would file an appeal to have AC reconsider the decision. He claimed that "AC's decision was based on incomplete information, contradictory reasoning and use of results outside of the qualifying window and at non-marathon events". He also claimed that selectors were biased in favour of Levins due to his close contact with AC giving him more opportunity to explain away poor performances. Despite Woodfine's allegations, AC Commissioner Frank Fowlie rejected his appeal, confirming AC's previous decisions. This left Woodfine off the team as the alternate.

After a series of disappointing marathons, a 2:23:35 at London 2021 and a 2:21:55 at Ottawa 2022, Woodfine returned to form in November 2023 with a half marathon personal best of 1:02:40 to take sixth at the B.A.A. Half Marathon. Two months later in January 2024, he contested the Houston Marathon, running a personal best of 2:10:39.
