= Cecil Smith (track and field) =

- Born: 1936; Wales
- Died: December 2, 2016 (aged 80); Brampton, Ontario, Canada
- Spouse: Beth
- Children: Clare and Jarod
- Awards: Queen Elizabeth II Golden Jubilee Medal, 2002

Cecil Smith (1936-2016) was the executive director of the Ontario Track and Field Association for a quarter century, and publisher of Athletics magazine. He coached former Guinness World Record holder Maggie Woods and Olympian Julie White. He led the bid for the 1988 World Juniors, Sudbury, was involved in planning for 1993 World Indoor Championships, Toronto, and was a member for the secretariats of the 1976 Montreal Olympics and 1978 Commonwealth Games in Edmonton. As of 1999, he was Canada's technical delegate to the International Amateur Athletics Federation.

He was inducted into the Athletics Ontario Hall of Fame in 2010 as a builder. The media has referred to him as a "guru" of athletics, and Athletics Canada dubbed him "a true pillar and icon of the sport." He was the creator of the biennial Pan American Junior Athletics Championships.
