= Leslie Sexton =

Canadian long-distance runner

Personal information
- Born: May 17, 1987 (age 39) Markham, Ontario, Canada
- Education: Queen's University
- Height: 5 ft 4 in (163 cm)

Sport
- Event: Marathon
- University team: Queen's Gaels
- Club: Vancouver Thunderbirds
- Coached by: Steve Weiler

Achievements and titles
- Personal bests: 5000 m: 15:27.70 (Portland 2023); Marathon: 2:28:14 (Houston 2024)

Leslie Sexton (born 17 May 1987) is a Canadian long-distance runner. In the marathon, she holds a personal best of 2:28:14 and finished 13th at the 2022 World Athletics Championships.

== Running career ==
From 2005 to 2009, Sexton competed for the Queen's University Gaels, finishing runner-up in the 3000 m at the 2008 and 2009 OUA Championships.

=== 2011 ===
In 2011, Sexton won the Canadian 5000 m title in a time of 16:55.01. In October of that year, she made her half marathon debut, winning the Toronto Waterfront Half Marathon in 1:16:33.

=== 2012 ===
In April 2012, Sexton competed at the Canadian Half Marathon Championships in Montreal, finishing second behind Kate Bazely. In June, Leslie won the Canadian title over 10,000 m, winning a time of 35:18.97.

=== 2013 ===
In 2013, Sexton won both the Virginia Beach and Columbus Half Marathons, winning in successive personal bests of 1:15:28 in Virginia and 1:13:13 in Columbus.

=== 2014-16 ===
Sexton made her marathon debut in 2014, running 2:50:56 to take 7th at the Columbus Marathon. In her second marathon, at the 2015 Virginia Beach Marathon, she ran an 11-minute personal best, winning in 2:39:34. Her next attempt over the distance came at the Toronto Waterfront Marathon in October 2015. There she claimed the Canadian marathon title and ran a personal best of 2:33:23. Although her time was under the Olympic qualifying standard of 2:45:00, her time was short of Athletics Canada's standard for selection of 2:29:50.

=== 2017-18 ===
In October 2017, Sexton took her second Canadian marathon title, placing as the top Canadian and fifth overall finisher at the Toronto Waterfront Marathon. The following year, she would take second at the Canadian marathon championships, losing to marathon debutant Kinsey Middleton.

=== 2019 ===
In 2019, Sexton set personal bests in the half and full marathons, running 2:31:51 to take eighth at the Prague Marathon in May and finishing second at the Philadelphia Half Marathon in 1:11:22 in November. In October, she contested the Toronto Waterfront Marathon but dropped out around 15 km.

Competing at the 2021 Canadian 10,000 m Championships in June, Leslie would place third in a time of 33:42.58. In October, she would run a 10 km personal best of 32:04, to take first at the Canadian 10 km road championships. On November 21, Sexton ran a personal best of 2:28:35, to win the Philadelphia Marathon.

In 2022, Sexton was selected for her first national team, representing Canada in the marathon at the 2022 World Athletics Championships in Eugene, Oregon. In Eugene, she would finish 13th as the top Canadian, running 2:28:52.

=== 2023 ===
2023 (with the exception of 2020), would mark Sexton first year without running a marathon since 2016. In lieu of the marathon, Sexton focused on the 5000 m, running a personal best of 15:27.70 in Portland on June 4 and placing third behind Briana Scott and Julie-Anne Staehli at the Canadian Championships.

=== 2024 ===
On January 14, Sexton entered the Houston Marathon with the aim of hitting the Olympic qualifying standard of 2:26:50. After going through halfway in 1:13:17, on pace to hit the standard, she faded over the last half, running 2:28:14, still a personal best. In March, Sexton was selected to represent Canada at the 2024 World Cross Country Championships in Belgade, Serbia. She would finish as the second Canadian, running the 10 km course in 34:55.

== Competition record ==
Representing Canada
Year	Comepetition	Venue	Position	Event	Time
2022	World Championships	Eugene, Oregon	13th	Marathon	2:28:52
2024	World Cross Country Championships	Belgrade, Serbia	42nd	Senior race	34:55
