= 2023 Canadian Track and Field Championships =

- Organisers: Athletics Canada
- Dates: July 27-30, 2023
- Host city: Langley, British Columbia
- Venue: McLeod Athletic Park
- Level: Senior
- Official website: https://athletics.ca/events/bell-canadian-track-field-championships-2023/

The 2023 Canadian Track and Field Championships took place in Langley, British Columbia from July 27 to 30. Organized by Athletics Canada, they served as the senior national championship for track and field in Canada.

Granted they had achieved the world standard or had the necessary world ranking, athletes finishing in first earned automatic berths to represent Canada at the 2023 World Athletics Championships in Budapest, Hungary. The championships were held concurrently with the Canadian U20 Track and Field Championships.

== Men's results ==
Athlete selected to compete in event at the 2023 World Athletics Championships

=== Track events ===
Event	Gold		Silver		Bronze	
100 metres	Aaron Brown	10.08	Brendon Rodney	10.12	Bismark Boateng	10.17
200 metres	Andre De Grasse	20.01	Aaron Brown	20.10	Brendon Rodney	20.15
400 metres	Christopher Morales Williams	45.48	Miles Misener-Daley	45.96	Nathan George	46.55
800 metres	Marco Arop	1:44.64	Abdullahi Hassan	1:46.93	Stephen Evans	1:47.02
1500 metres	Kieran Lumb	3:37.24	Charles Philibert-Thiboutot	3:38.01	Jean-Simon Desgagnés	3:40.59
5000 metres	Ben Flanagan	13:39.96	Mitchell Ubene	13:43.41	Thomas Fafard	13:49.49
10,000 metres (Note: The 10,000 m events were held separately at the Pacific Distance Carnival on June 23)	Jeremy Coughler	28:46.96	Perry Mackinson	28:52.60	Juan Luis Barrios	28:55.82
110 metres hurdles	Craig Thorne	13.59	Damian Warner	13.73	David Adeleye	13.98
400 metres hurdles	Justin Rose	51.38	Ben Tilson	51.97	Owen Babcock	52.66
3000 metres steeplechase	Jean-Simon Desgagnés	8:24.47	Jordan Macintosh	8:31.32	Kevin Robertson	8:37.94
20 kilometres race walk	Tyler Wilson	1:37:21	Heath Semeniuk	1:47:21	Jianping Xu	1:58:43

=== Field events ===
Event	Gold		Silver		Bronze	
High jump	Django Lovett	2.18 m	Noel Vanderzee	2.16 m	Eric Chatten	2.14 m
Pole vault	Nojah Parker	5.40 m	Nathan Filipek	5.23 m	Daniel Gleason	5.18 m
Long jump	Pierce LePage	7.64 m	Scott Joseph	7.46 m	Olorunfemi Akinduro	7.23 m
Triple jump	Olorunfemi Akinduro	16.14 m	Kenneth West	15.58 m	Daxx Turner	15.44 m
Shot put	Mark Bujnowski	19.60 m	Youssef Koudssi	19.05 m	Spencer Lewis	17.89 m
Discus throw	Youssef Koudssi	58.47 m	Jerimiah Nubbe	57.32 m	Pierce LePage	52.31 m
Hammer throw	Ethan Katzberg	78.73 m	Rowan Hamilton	72.81 m	Adam Keenan	71.09 m
Decathlon	Jared Hendricks-Polack	6929	Cole Wilson	6803	Max Speiser	6729

== Women's results ==
Athlete selected to compete in event at the 2023 World Athletics Championships

=== Track events ===
Event	Gold		Silver		Bronze	
100 metres	Khamica Bingham	11.25	Sade McCreath	11.32	Jacqueline Madogo	11.33
200 metres	Jacqueline Madogo	22.91	Sade McCreath	23.19	Zoe Sherar	23.33
400 metres	Grace Konrad	52.11	Zoe Sherar	52.30	Madeline Price	52.57
800 metres	Madeleine Kelly	2:02.29	Aurora Rynda	2:02.73	Jazz Shukla	2:03.94
1500 metres	Lucia Stafford	4:09.52`	Simone Plourde	4:10.36	Regan Yee	4:11.18
5000 metres	Briana Scott	15:46.72	Julie-Anne Staehli	15:47.62	Leslie Sexton	15:50.08
10,000 metres	Natasha Wodak	32:42.77	Katelyn Ayers	33:11.72	Cleo Boyd	33:27.18
100 metres hurdles	Michelle Harrison	12.82	Mariam Abdul-Rashid	12.83	Tatiana Aholou	13.13
400 metres hurdles	Savannah Sutherland	56.14	Brooke Overholt	56.17	Marie-Frédérique Poulin	58.49
3000 metres steeplechase	Regan Yee	9:24.82	Ceili McCabe	9:25.98	Grace Fetherstonaugh	9:31.27

=== Field events ===
Event	Gold		Silver		Bronze	
High jump	Marguerite Lorenzo	1.82 m	Falyn Reaugh	1.78 m	Madisson Lawrence	1.74 m
Pole vault	Alysha Newman	4.73 m	Anicka Newell	4.46 m	Heather Abadie	4.21 m
Long jump	Hayley Manners	6.10 m	Aasha Goodwiler	5.98 m	Leah Jones	5.89 m
Triple jump	Caroline Ehrhardt	13.30 m	Busola Akinduro	12.82 m	Mandy Brunet	12.52 m
Shot put	Sarah Mitton	19.69 m	Grace Tennat	16.49 m	Cynthia Appiah	14.84 m
Discus throw	Julia Tunks	57.17 m	Rachel Andres	54.50 m	Sara Han	50.04 m
Hammer throw	Camryn Rogers	77.43 m	Kaila Butler	65.61 m	Jillian Weir	65.58 m
Heptathlon	Nicole Osterag	6019	Georgia Ellenwood	6001	Madisson Lawrence	5710
