= Rachel Seaman =

Canadian race walker

Personal information
- Born: Rachel Lavallée; January 14, 1986 (age 40) Peterborough, Ontario, Canada
- Height: 1.72 m (5 ft 8 in)
- Weight: 57 kg (126 lb)
- Spouse: Tim Seaman (m. 2009)

Sport
- Country: Canada
- Sport: Athletics
- Event: 20 km Race Walk

Rachel Seaman (née Lavallée, born January 14, 1986, in Peterborough, Ontario) is a Canadian race walker. She competed in the 20 kilometres walk event at the 2012 Summer Olympics.

She began race walking at age 14 but decided to focus on the event at 18. A year later, she won the 2005 Pan American Race Walking Cup Junior championship. Her first experience internationally at the senior level was the 2006 IAAF World Race Walking Cup, which is where she met future husband, American race walker and coach Tim Seaman. The couple was married October 31, 2009. She now lives and trains with him in Chula Vista, California.

She set her first Canadian record in the 20 km walk at the 2011 USATF Masters Championships, the St. Patrick's Day 20K in Huntington Beach, California. As she has improved her personal best, she has improved the record several times. Her current record is 1:29:54, set March 15, 2015, at the Asian Race Walking Championships in Nomi, Japan. Her split time at 15 km is also the national record. She has also added Canadian Indoor records in the 1 mile walk 6:17.29 and 3000 metres walk 12:23.84.

== Achievements ==
- 1st place, 2012 National Championships (Calgary, Canada) (Olympic "A" Standard)
- 35th, 20 kilometres walk, 2009 IAAF World Championships in Athletics, Berlin, Germany
- 37th, 20 kilometres walk, 2011 IAAF World Championships in Athletics (in Daegu, South Korea)
- 13th, 20 kilometres walk, 2015 IAAF World Championships in Athletics (in Beijing, China)
