= Krista DuChene =

Canadian long-distance runner

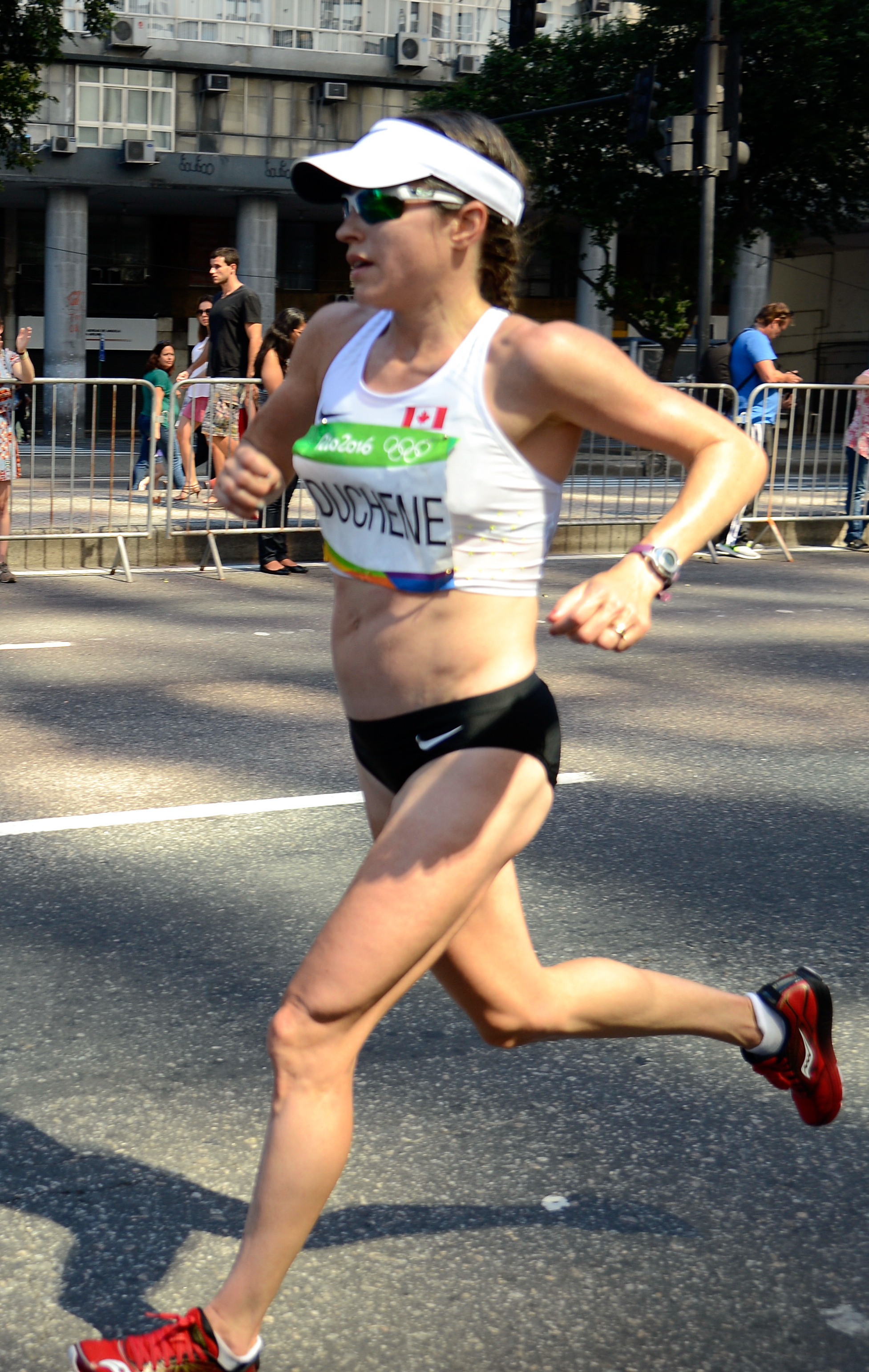
- DuChene at the 2016 Olympics

Personal information
- Born: January 9, 1977 (age 49) Strathroy, Ontario
- Height: 167 cm (5 ft 5 1/2 in)
- Weight: 54 kg (119 lb)

Sport
- Country: Canada
- Sport: Athletics
- Event: Marathon

Achievements and titles
- Personal best: 2:28:32 (2013)
Medal record
Bronze medal – third place	2018 Boston Marathon	Marathon
Gold medal – first place	2016 Canadian Championships	Marathon
Gold medal – first place	2013 Canadian Championships	Half Marathon

Krista Duchene (born January 9, 1977) is a Canadian track and field athlete competing in the marathon.

== History ==
In 2010, DuChene won the national Canadian title.

In 2013, DuChene won the Canadian Half Marathon Championships at the Banque Scotia 21K de Montréal and made her IAAF World Championships debut at the 2013 in Moscow but collapsed at the 13 km mark due to extremely hot conditions. DuChene was one of 25 competitors unable to finish the race.

In April 2014 during the Montreal half-marathon, DuChene broke her right femur. Feeling pain with 5 km to go but with 500m to go, the undiagnosed stress fracture turned into a full fracture where the femur meets the hip bone. Pushing forward, she finished in third place. DuChene underwent surgery to implant a plate and three screws causing her to miss the 2014 Commonwealth Games and 2015 Pan Am Games.

In July 2016, she was included into Canada's Olympic team, as the oldest athlete on the team. She competed in the Marathon for Canada at the 2016 Summer Olympics in Rio de Janeiro, Brazil finishing 35th of the 133 behind fellow Canadian Lanni Marchant in 24th.

In October 2016, she won the Canadian Marathon Championships at the Toronto Waterfront Marathon.

At the 2018 Boston Marathon, she finished third.

On March 5, 2023, she finished the Tokyo Marathon in a time of 2:38:53, breaking the Canadian +45 Women's record.

== See also ==
- Canadian Marathon Championships
- Canadian Half Marathon Championships
- Athletics at the 2016 Summer Olympics – Women's marathon
- 2013 World Championships in Athletics – Women's marathon
