= Athletics Ontario =

Sports governing body in Ontario, Canada

Athletics Ontario is the governing body of track and field sports in Ontario, Canada. Athletics Ontario was founded in 1974 under the name Ontario Track and Field Association to replace several regional bodies under Athletics Canada. In 2008 its name was formally changed. Athletics Ontario is based in Toronto, Ontario.

== History ==
Athletics Ontario is a branch of Athletics Canada. Until 1974, Ontario was split into three governing bodies, Southwestern, Northwestern, and Central. However, there was an interest in establishing a more efficient means of developing the sport while maintaining a system which would still enable regions to have a voice regarding major decisions in the province. As a result, a new provincial association, composed of six newly defined regions was formed in 1974, and in October 1977 the Ontario Track and Field Association became an incorporated body.

Athletics Ontario is governed by its board of directors whose Chair was Dean Hustwick as of 2020-2021.

== See also ==
- Sports in Canada
- Athletics Canada
- Other Provincial Organizations Governing Athletics
