= Reid Coolsaet =

Canadian long-distance runner

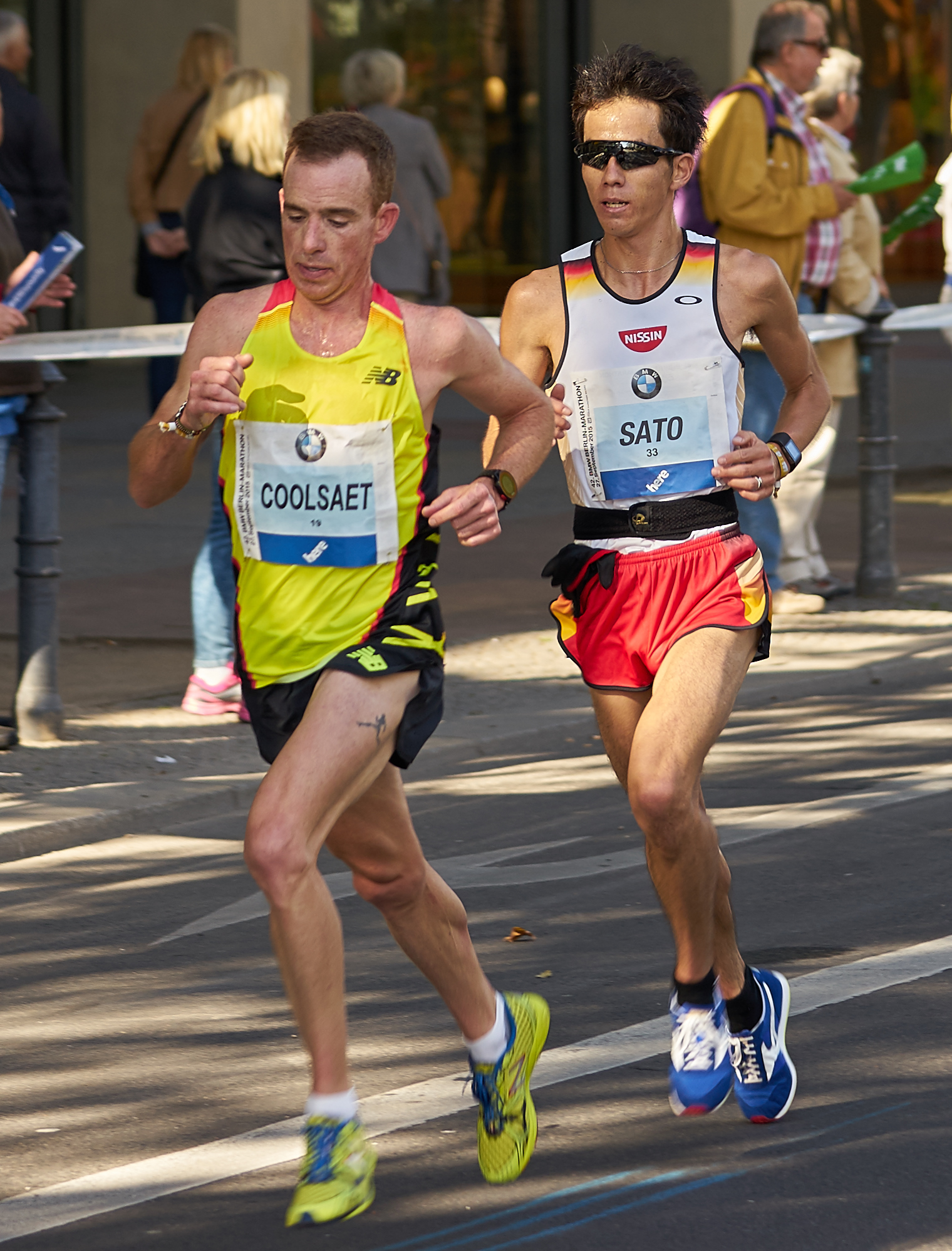
- Coolsaet (left) at the 2015 Berlin Marathon

Personal information
- Born: July 29, 1979 (age 46) Hamilton, Ontario, Canada
- Height: 5 ft 9 in (175 cm)
- Weight: 140 lb (64 kg)

Sport
- Sport: Running
- Event(s): 10,000 metres, Half Marathon, Marathon

Reid Coolsaet (born July 29, 1979) is a Canadian long-distance runner who competes in the marathon.

== Career ==
He is a University of Guelph alumnus, having competed as a Gryphon during his time there. He made his first international appearances for Canada at the IAAF World Cross Country Championships, running at the annual in 2002 and then 2004–2006. He won the 5000 meters at the NACAC U-25 Championships in 2002. On the track, he won the silver medal over 5000 meters at the 2005 Summer Universiade then represented his country at the 2005 World Championships in Athletics. He came thirteenth in the same event at the 2006 Commonwealth Games. He is also a four-time national champion in the 5000 meters (2004, 2005, 2006, 2007).

Coolsaet moved up to the marathon distance for the first time in 2009 and came eighth in a time of 2:17:10 hours, taking the national title as the first Canadian home. He went on to make his international debut in the event at the 2009 World Championships in Athletics and finished in 25th place. He returned to the Toronto race the following year and knocked over five minutes off his personal best, recording a time of 2:11:22 hours for tenth place. In 2011, he ran the second-fastest marathon by a Canadian athlete, finishing third in the Toronto Waterfront Marathon on October 16, 2011, with a time of 2 hours, 10 minutes, and 55 seconds. This time qualified him for the 2012 London Olympics, along with fellow Canadian Eric Gillis, in which he placed 27th.

In July 2016, he was named to Canada's Olympic team.

== Honours ==
In 2012 Coolsaet was awarded the Queen Elizabeth II Diamond Jubilee Medal.

== International competitions ==
Year	Competition	Venue	Position	Event	Notes
2003	North American Men's Marathon Relay Championships	Akron, United States	3rd	Marathon relay	2:09:54
