= Peter Maher (runner) =

Canadian marathon runner (born 1960)

Peter Kevin Maher (born March 30, 1960, in Ottawa, Ontario) is a former Canadian marathon runner who competed mainly in the 1990s. He was a resident of Thornhill, a suburb of Toronto. He was credited for a brief period with the world record time for 25 km. Maher represented Canada in the Olympic men's marathons in Seoul, 1988 and Barcelona, 1992. He is said to be the originator of the quote "Running is a big question mark that's there each and every day. It asks you, 'Are you going to be a wimp or are you going to be strong today." Maher also now runs a Sports Therapy Clinic in Carrigaline, County Cork, Ireland.

== Achievements ==
Year	Competition	Venue	Position	Event	Notes
Representing Canada
1987	California International Marathon	Sacramento, United States	1st	Marathon	2:16:49
1987	World Championships	Rome, Italy	32nd	Marathon	2:26:40
1987	National Capital Marathon	Ottawa, Ontario, Canada	1st	Marathon	2:12:58
1988	Olympic Games	Seoul, South Korea	46th	Marathon	2:24:49
1990	Goodwill Games	Seattle, United States	3rd	Marathon	2:17:16
1991	World Championships	Tokyo, Japan	13th	Marathon	2:20:31
1992	Olympic Games	Barcelona, Spain	—	Marathon	DNF
1993	World Championships	Stuttgart, Germany	10th	Marathon	2:19:26
1995	World Championships	Gothenburg, Sweden	—	Marathon	DNF

== See also ==
- Canadian records in track and field
