= Andrea Seccafien =

Canadian long-distance runner

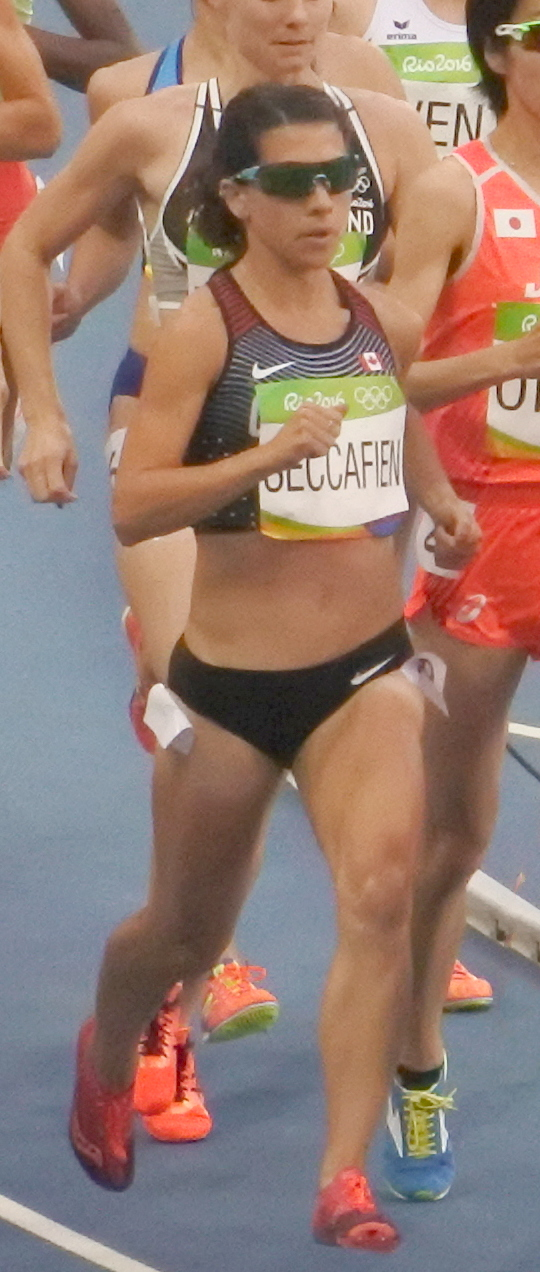
- Seccafien at the 2016 Olympics

Personal information
- Born: August 27, 1990 (age 36) Guelph, Ontario
- Height: 155 cm (5 ft 1 in)
- Weight: 47 kg (104 lb)

Sport
- Country: Canada
- Sport: Athletics
- Events: 1500 m, 5000 m
- Club: University of Toronto Track Club
- Coached by: Ross Ristuccia

Achievements and titles
- Personal bests: 1500 – 4:10.70 (2016); 5,000 m – 14:57.07 (2021); 10,000 m – 31:13.94 (2021); Half marathon –1:09:38 (2020)
Medal record
Women's athletics
Representing Canada
Olympic Games

Andrea Seccafien (born August 27, 1990, in Guelph, Ontario) is a Canadian long-distance runner, who mostly competes in the 5000 m event.

In 2010, Seccafien enrolled to the Samford University in the United States. After two years, she transferred to the University of Guelph in Canada to study economics and political sciences. In 2013, she won the national 5000 m title at the Canadian Championships. She missed the 2015 season due to a foot injury. In May 2016, she ran a personal best of 15:17.81 and qualified for the 2016 Olympics. In July 2016, she was officially named to the Canadian Olympic team.

She represented Canada at the 2020 Summer Olympics. In 2021, Seccafien beat the Canadian record for 10,000 m at the Sound Running Track Meet with a time of 31:13.94. She finished 15th in the Athletics at the 2020 Summer Olympics – Women's 5000 metres.
