= Canadian Track and Field Championships =

Annual track and field competition in Canada

- Sport: Track and field
- Founded: 1884
- Country: Canada
- Related competitions: Canadian Indoor Track and Field Championships Canadian Junior Track and Field Championships
- Website: Athletics.ca

The Canadian Track and Field Championships is an annual outdoor track and field competition organized by Athletics Canada, which serves as the Canadian national championships for the sport. The championships serve as part of the selection process for Canadian teams at the Olympic Games, World Athletics Championships, Commonwealth Games, Pan American Games, and NACAC Championships.

The most recent edition of the competition took place in Montreal, Quebec and served as the Paralympic and Olympic trials for the 2024 Paris Games. The next edition is set to take place in Ottawa, Ontario and will serve as part of the selection process for the 2025 World Athletics Championships.

== History ==
The Canadian Track and Field Championships began in 1884 under the Amateur Athletic Union of Canada, during a time when organized sport in the country was still in its infancy. The early decades, from the 1880s to the 1910s, were marked by amateurism and limited participation, though the event quickly established itself as the key national competition for Canadian athletes. Despite interruptions caused by World War I, the Championships grew steadily in influence.

In the 1920s and 1930s, the Championships helped launch the careers of athletes like Olympic sprint champion Percy Williams. The event became more structured and competitive, although economic hardship during the Great Depression posed challenges for athlete development. After a pause during World War II, the Championships resumed in the 1940s and saw significant growth in the 1950s, with broader participation across provinces and a slow increase in women’s involvement.

The 1960s and 1970s were transitional decades. The Championships became more professional in structure and began reflecting the modernization of global athletics. Athletes like Bruce Kidd rose to prominence, while debates over amateurism and athlete rights gained attention. In the 1980s, the Championships became more integrated with Canada’s international ambitions. Though overshadowed by the Ben Johnson doping scandal in 1988, the decade also featured the rise of world-class Canadian talent.

The 1990s focused on rebuilding the sport’s image, with Donovan Bailey’s 1996 Olympic success becoming a highlight. The Championships were increasingly used as selection trials for major events like the Olympics and World Championships. In the 2000s, improved infrastructure, coaching, and athlete funding elevated the competition’s standards, helping athletes like Perdita Felicien and Tyler Christopher excel.

During the 2010s, the Championships became more inclusive and better promoted, serving as a platform for stars such as Andre De Grasse, Melissa Bishop, and Damian Warner. Community engagement and gender equity became stronger priorities. The COVID-19 pandemic disrupted the 2020 event, but by the 2020s, the Championships returned with renewed energy. Recent editions in Langley, BC have reaffirmed their role as a top-tier national trial event and a key part of Canada’s global track and field presence.

== Events ==
=== Track Events ===
- Sprints: 100 m, 200 m, 400 m
- Middle distance: 800 m, 1500 m
- Long distance: 5000 m, 10,000 m
- Hurdles: 100 m hurdles (women) / 110 m hurdles (men), 400 m hurdles
- Steeplechase: 3000 m
- Race walk: 20 km race walk events for men & women
- Relays: typically 4×100 m and 4×400 m finals

=== Field Events ===
- Jumps: Long jump, triple jump, high jump, pole vault
- Throws: Shot put, discus throw, hammer throw, javelin throw

=== Combined Events ===
- Decathlon (men) — 10 events conducted over two days
- Heptathlon (women) — 7 events over two days

=== Para Athletics (Para‑Athletes) ===
Para-specific track and field events are incorporated across the schedule—for wheelchair racing, ambulatory track, and field events across functional classifications. These include sprint distances, throws, and jumps tailored to classification groups. Para combined events may also be included depending on entries

== Editions ==
Year	City	Venue
1994	Ottawa, Ontario	
1995	Montreal, Quebec	
1996	Montreal, Quebec	
1997	Abbotsford, British Columbia	
1998	Montreal, Quebec	
1999	Winnipeg, Manitoba	University Stadium
2000	Victoria, British Columbia	Centennial Stadium
2001	Edmonton, Alberta	Commonwealth Stadium
2002	Edmonton, Alberta	Foote Field
2003	Victoria, British Columbia	Centennial Stadium
2004	Victoria, British Columbia	Centennial Stadium
2005	Winnipeg, Manitoba	University Stadium
2006	Ottawa, Ontario	Terry Fox Athletic Park
2007	Windsor, Ontario	University of Windsor Stadium
2008	Windsor, Ontario	University of Windsor Stadium
2009	Toronto, Ontario	Varsity Stadium
2010	Toronto, Ontario	Varsity Stadium
2011	Calgary, Alberta	Foothills Athletic Park
2012	Calgary, Alberta	Foothills Athletic Park
2013	Moncton, New Brunswick	Moncton Stadium
2014	Moncton, New Brunswick	Moncton Stadium
2015	Edmonton, Alberta	Foote Field
2016	Edmonton, Alberta	Foote Field
2017	Ottawa, Ontario	Terry Fox Athletic Park
2018	Ottawa, Ontario	Terry Fox Athletic Park
2019	Montreal, Quebec	Complexe sportif Claude-Robillard
2020	cancelled due to COVID-19 pandemic	
2021	Montreal, Quebec	Complexe sportif Claude-Robillard
2022	Langley, British Columbia	McLeod Athletic Park
2023	Langley, British Columbia	McLeod Athletic Park
2024	Montreal, Quebec	Complexe sportif Claude-Robillard
2025	Ottawa, Ontario	Terry Fox Athletic Park
2026	Ottawa, Ontario	Terry Fox Athletic Park

== Records ==
=== Men ===
Event	Record	Athlete/Team	Date	Place	Ref.
100 metres	9.89	Bruny Surin	1 August 1998	Montreal	
200 metres	19.96	Brendon Rodney	10 July 2016	Edmonton	
400 metres	45.03	Tyler Christopher	5 July 2008	Windsor	
800 m	1:43.53	Marco Arop	28 June 2024	Montreal	
1500 metres	3:37.24	Kieran Lumb	30 July 2023	Langley	
5000 metres	13:25.16	Sean Kaley	12 August 2000	Victoria	
110 metres hurdles	13.27	Mark McKoy	3 August 1985	Ottawa	
400 metres hurdles	49.68	Adam Kunkel	14 July 2007	Windsor	
3000 m steeplechase	8:20.68	John Gay	25 June 2021	Montreal	
High jump	2.34 m	Derek Drouin	4 July 2015	Edmonton	
Pole vault	5.75 m	Shawnacy Barber	7 July 2018	Ottawa	
Long jump	8.02 m	Edrick Floréal	6 August 1989	Ottawa	
Triple jump	16.56 m	Edrick Floréal	6 August 1989	Ottawa	
Shot put	22.21 m	Dylan Armstrong	25 June 2011	Calgary	
Discus throw	64.84 m	Jason Tunks	24 June 2001	Edmonton	
Hammer throw	82.60 m	Ethan Katzberg	26 June 2024	Montreal	
Javelin throw	80.17 m	Scott Russell	24 June 2001	Edmonton	
Decathlon	8498	Mike Smith	14 July 1995	Montreal	

=== Women ===
Event	Record	Athlete/Team	Date	Place	Ref.
100 metres	11.08	Philomena Mensah	1 August 1998	Montreal	
200 metres	22.64	Jillian Richardson	6 August 1989	Ottawa	
400 metres	50.57	Charmaine Crooks	4 August 1990	Montreal	
800 m	1:58.20	Jazz Shukla	29 June 2024	Montreal	
1500 metres	4:04.51	Malindi Elmore	11 July 2004	Victoria	
5000 metres	15:08.90	Émilie Mondor	18 July 2003	Victoria	
100 metres hurdles	12.60	Perdita Felicien	9 July 2004	Victoria	
400 metres hurdles	54.97	Sage Watson	9 July 2017	Ottawa	
3000 m steeplechase	9:24.82	Regan Yee	27 July 2023	Langley	
High jump	1.95 m	Nicole Forrester	6 July 2008	Windsor	
Pole vault	4.75 m	Alysha Newman	28 June 2024	Montreal	
Long jump	6.63 m	Christabel Nettey	26 June 2022	Langley	
Triple jump	13.92 m	Tabia Charles	6 July 2008	Windsor	
Shot put	20.33 m NR	Sarah Mitton	25 June 2022	Langley	
Discus throw	59.58 m	Carmen Ionesco			
Hammer throw	77.43 m	Camryn Rogers	28 July 2023	Langley	
Javelin throw	63.40 m	Elizabeth Gleadle	26 July 2019	Montreal	
Heptathlon	6599	Jessica Zelinka	28 June 2012	Calgary	

== See also ==
- Athletics Canada
- Sports in Canada
- Canadian records in track and field
- AC Indoor Open
- Canadian Marathon Championships
- Canadian Half Marathon Championships
