= Trevor Hofbauer =

Canadian long-distance runner

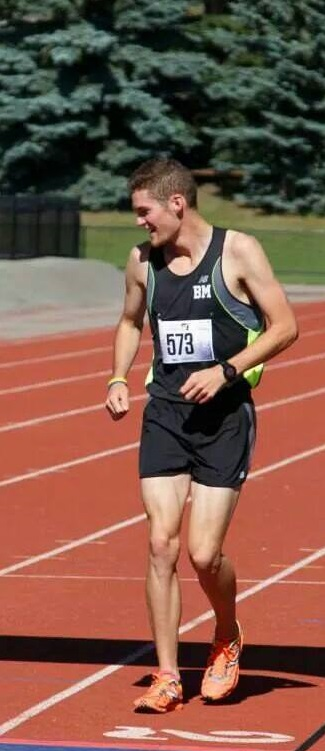
- Trevor Hofbauer pictured in 2014 at the Dino Dash

Personal information
- Nationality: Canadian
- Born: 8 March 1992 (age 34) Burnaby, British Columbia, Canada
- Height: 190 cm (6 ft 3 in)
- Weight: 77 kg (170 lb)

Sport
- Sport: Distance Running
- Event: Marathon

Achievements and titles
- Personal bests: 10 km: 29:24 (2018); Half-Marathon: 1:04:30 (2015); Marathon: 2:09:51 (2019)

Trevor Hofbauer (born 8 March 1992) is a Canadian long-distance runner.

== Career ==
In 2017, Hofbauer competed at the 2017 IAAF World Cross Country Championships in Kampala, Uganda and finished in 71st place in a time of 31:43. In 2019, Hofbauer won the Canadian Championships as part of the Toronto Waterfront Marathon, by breaking his personal best by more than seven minutes and falling below the Olympic standard. In May 2020, Hofbauer became one of the first three athletes named to Canada's 2020 Olympics team. Hofbauer currently resides and trains in Kelowna, British Columbia.
