= List of Canadian records in athletics =

The following is a list of national outdoor and indoor athletics records for Canada maintained by Canada's national athletics federation, Athletics Canada.

== Outdoor ==
Key to tables: Awaiting ratification Record not kept by Athletics Canada Not ratified or later rescinded by Athletics Canada

=== Men ===
Event	Record	Athlete	Date	Meet	Place	Ref.
50 m	5.53+ (+0.2 m/s) (Note: 6.40 by other sources)	Bruny Surin	August 22, 1999	World Championships	Seville, Spain	
60 m	6.38+ (+0.2 m/s) (Note: 6.25 by other sources)	Bruny Surin	August 22, 1999	World Championships	Seville, Spain	
100 y	9.1 h (+0.5 m/s)	Harry Jerome	July 15, 1966	Canadian Championships	Edmonton, Canada	
100 m	9.84 (+0.7 m/s)	Donovan Bailey	July 27, 1996	Olympic Games	Atlanta, United States	
100 m	9.84 (+0.2 m/s)	Bruny Surin	August 22, 1999	World Championships	Seville, Spain	
100 m	9.83 X (Note: annulled by World Athletics as a world record and no longer recognised by federation due to doping revelations)	Ben Johnson	August 30, 1987	World Championships	Rome, Italy	
100 m	9.79 X (Note: annulled by World Athletics as a world record and no longer recognised by federation due to doping revelations)	Ben Johnson	September 24, 1988	Olympic Games	Seoul, South Korea	
220 y	20.4 h NWI	Harry Jerome	August 7, 1966	Canadian Championships	Edmonton, Canada	
200 m	19.62 (−0.5 m/s)	Andre de Grasse	August 4, 2021	Olympic Games	Tokyo, Japan	
200 m (straight)	19.89 (−0.3 m/s)	Jerome Blake	May 23, 2021	Adidas Boost Boston Games	Boston, United States	
300 m	31.77	Tyler Christopher	May 20, 2004		Sainte Anne	
400 m	44.44	Tyler Christopher	August 12, 2005	World Championships	Helsinki, Finland	
400 m	44.05	Christopher Morales Williams	May 11, 2024	SEC Championships	Gainesville, United States	
800 m	1:41.20	Marco Arop	August 10, 2024	Olympic Games	Saint-Denis, France	
1000 m	2:13.13	Marco Arop	September 8, 2024	Hanžeković Memorial	Zagreb, Croatia	
1500 m	3:31.71	Kevin Sullivan	June 30, 2000	Golden Gala	Rome, Italy	
Mile	3:50.26	Kevin Sullivan	July 28, 2000	Bislett Games	Oslo, Norway	
Mile (road)	3:56.0 h	Graham Hood	December 13, 1997		Honolulu, United States	
Mile (road)	3:56.55	Foster Malleck	September 19, 2026	World Road Running Championships	Copenhagen, Denmark	
2000 m	4:51.54	Charles Philibert-Thiboutot	September 8, 2023	Memorial van Damme	Brussels, Belgium	
3000 m	7:31.96	Mohammed Ahmed	August 25, 2024	Kamila Skolimoswka Memorial	Chorzów, Poland	
Two miles	8:15.76	Mohammed Ahmed	June 30, 2019	Prefontaine Classic	Stanford, United States	
5000 m	12:47.20	Mohammed Ahmed	July 10, 2020	Bowerman Track Club Intrasquad Meet II	Portland, United States	
5 km (road)	13:15	Mohammed Ahmed	September 6, 2026	New Balance Kö Meile	Düsseldorf, Germany	
10,000 m	26:34.14	Mohammed Ahmed	March 6, 2022	Sound Running Ten	San Juan Capistrano, United States	
10 km (road)	28:06	Charles Philibert-Thiboutot	May 24, 2025	Ottawa Race Weekend	Ottawa, Canada	
10 km (road)	27:50	Kieran Lumb	January 11, 2026	10K Valencia Ibercaja by Kiprun	Valencia, Spain	
15 km (road)	42:52+	Cameron Levins	April 28, 2024	Istanbul Half Marathon	Istanbul, Turkey	
10 miles (road)	45:52	Jeff Schiebler	December 8, 1996	Kosa 10-Miler	Kōsa, Japan	
20 km (road)	57:22+	Cameron Levins	April 28, 2024	Istanbul Half Marathon	Istanbul, Turkey	
One hour	19.602 km	Thomas Howard	April 16, 1974		Richmond, Canada	
Half marathon	59:49	Rory Linkletter	January 11, 2026	Houston Half Marathon	Houston, Texas	
25 km (road)	1:14:29	Peter Maher	October 12, 1991	Stepahead Stampede	Indianapolis, United States	
30 km (road)	1:31:10+	Cameron Levins	July 17, 2022	World Championships	Eugene, United States	
Marathon	2:05:36	Cameron Levins	March 5, 2023	Tokyo Marathon	Tokyo, Japan	
50 km (road)	2:48:32	Chris Balestrini	May 21, 2021		Hamilton, Canada	
100 km (road)	6:33:57	Andrew Jones	December 14, 1991		New Orleans, United States	
110 m hurdles	13.08 (+1.2 m/s)	Mark McKoy	July 1, 1993		Lille, France	
400 m hurdles	48.24	Adam Kunkel	July 27, 2007	Pan American Games	Rio de Janeiro, Brazil	
3000 m steeplechase	8:11.64	Matthew Hughes	August 15, 2013	World Championships	Moscow, Russia	
High jump	2.40 m	Derek Drouin	April 25, 2014	Drake Relays	Des Moines, United States	
Pole vault	5.93 m	Shawnacy Barber	July 25, 2015	London Grand Prix	London, United Kingdom	
Long jump	8.28 m (+1.2 m/s) (Note: record set during decathlon competition)	Damian Warner	May 29, 2018	Hypo-Meeting	Götzis, Austria	
Triple jump	17.29 m A (+1.0 m/s)	Edrick Floreal	June 3, 1989	NCAA Division I Championships	Provo, United States	
Shot put	22.21 m A	Dylan Armstrong	June 25, 2011	Canadian Championships	Calgary, Alberta, Canada	
Discus throw	67.88 m	Jason Tunks	May 14, 1998	ACU Last Chance	Abilene, United States	
Hammer throw	84.70 m	Ethan Katzberg	September 16, 2025	World Championships	Tokyo, Japan	
Javelin throw	84.81 m	Scott Russell	July 13, 2011	Toronto International Track & Field Games	Toronto, Ontario, Canada	
Decathlon	9018 pts	Damian Warner	August 4-5, 2021	Olympic Games	Tokyo, Japan	
Decathlon	100m (wind) / Long jump (wind) / Shot put / High jump / 400m / 110m H (wind) / Discus / Pole vault / Javelin / 1500m; 10.12 (+0.2 m/s) / 8.24 m (+0.2 m/s) / 14.80 m / 2.02 m / 47.48 / 13.46 (−1.0 m/s) / 48.67 m / 4.90 m / 63.44 m / 4:31.08					
3000 m walk (track)	11:12.23+	Evan Dunfee	June 18, 2021	Pacific Distance Carnival	Burnaby, Canada	
5000 m walk (track)	18:33.68	Evan Dunfee	June 2, 2024	Jesse Bent Invitational	Coquitlam, Canada	
10,000 m walk (track)	38:08.50	Evan Dunfee	January 27, 2025	Supernova	Canberra, Australia	
10 km walk (road)	39:21+	Inaki Gomez	March 20, 2016	Asian Race Walking Championships	Nomi, Japan	
15 km walk (road)	59:11+	Inaki Gomez	March 20, 2016	Asian Race Walking Championships	Nomi, Japan	
20,000 m walk (track)	1:21:57.0	Evan Dunfee	June 27, 2014	Canadian Championships	Moncton, Canada	
20 km walk (road)	1:17:39	Evan Dunfee	February 16, 2025	Australian 20km Race Walking Championships	Adelaide, Australia	
30 km walk (road)	2:01:00+	Evan Dunfee	March 22, 2025	Dudinská Päťdesiatka	Dudince, Slovakia	
35 km walk (road)	2:21:40	Evan Dunfee	March 22, 2025	Dudinská Päťdesiatka	Dudince, Slovakia	
50,000 m walk (track)	3:52:21.0	Tim Berrett	October 20, 2000		Victoria, Canada	
50 km walk (road)	3:41:38	Evan Dunfee	August 19, 2016	Olympic Games	Rio de Janeiro, Brazil	
4 × 100 m relay	37.48	Canada; Aaron Brown; Jerome Blake; Brendon Rodney; Andre De Grasse	July 23, 2022	World Championships	Eugene, United States	
4 × 200 m relay	1:19.20	Canada; Gavin Smellie; Brendon Rodney; Aaron Brown; Andre De Grasse	April 2, 2016	Florida Relays	Gainesville, United States	
4 × 400 m relay	3:02.64	Canada; Ian Seale; Don Domansky; Leighton Hope; Brian Saunders	July 31, 1976	Olympic Games	Montreal, Quebec, Canada	
Sprint medley relay (2,2,4,8)	3:19.03	Canada; Tremaine Harris (200 m); Joshue Cunningham (200 m); Austin Cole (400 m); Mohano Khelaf (800 m)	April 28, 2018	Penn Relays	Philadelphia, United States	
4 × 800 m relay	7:22.83	Canada; Andrew Heaney; Matt Lincoln; Andrew Maloney; Kyle Smith	June 21, 2007		Toronto, Ontario, Canada	
4 × 1500 m relay	15:25.38	Canada; Greg Hutchinson; Eric Gillis; Reid Coolsaet; Taylor Milne	June 23, 2006	Runners' Choice London Distance Series #3	London, Canada	

=== Women ===
Event	Record	Athlete	Date	Meet	Place	Ref.
100 m	10.86 (+1.7 m/s)	Sade McCreath	July 12, 2026	Edmonton Invitational	Edmonton, Canada	
200 m	22.36 (+1.1 m/s)	Audrey Leduc	June 3, 2024	Edwin Moses Classic	Atlanta, Georgia	
200 m	22.25 X	Angella Taylor-Issajenko	July 20, 1982		Colorado Springs, United States	
300 m	36.53	Lauren Gale	May 22, 2024	Trond Mohn Games	Bergen, Norway	
400 m	49.91	Marita Payne	August 6, 1984	Olympic Games	Los Angeles, United States	
400 m	49.91	Jillian Richardson	September 25, 1988	Olympic Games	Seoul, South Korea	
800 m	1:57.01	Melissa Bishop	July 21, 2017	Herculis	Fontvieille, Monaco	
1000 m	2:34.14	Diane Cummins	August 30, 2002	Memorial Van Damme	Brussels, Belgium	
1500 m	3:56.12	Gabriela Debues-Stafford	October 5, 2019	World Championships	Doha, Qatar	
Mile	4:17.87	Gabriela Debues-Stafford	July 12, 2019	Diamond League	Fontvieille, Monaco	
Mile (road)	4:28.0 h	Leah Pells	December 13, 1997		Honolulu, United States	
Mile (road)	4:29.1 h Wo	Nicole Sifuentes	December 10, 2016	Honolulu Kalakaua Merrie Mile	Honolulu, United States	
2000 m	5:31.18	Lucia Stafford	July 12, 2024	Herculis	Fontvieille, Monaco	
3000 m	8:32.17	Angela Chalmers	August 23, 1994	Commonwealth Games	Victoria, Canada	
Two miles	9:27.18	Kathy Butler	June 27, 1998		Dublin, Ireland	
5000 m	14:44.12	Gabriela Debues-Stafford	September 6, 2019	Diamond League	Brussels, Belgium	
5 km (road)	15:16	Emilie Mondor	October 24, 2004	Carlsbad 5000	Carlsbad, United States	
10,000 m	31:13.94	Andrea Seccafien	May 14, 2021	Sound Running Track Meet	Los Angeles, United States	
10 km (road)
10 km (road)	31:37	Gabriela DeBues-Stafford	October 18, 2026	Top Flight by RunThrough - Jarrow 10K	Jarrow, United Kingdom	
10 km (road)	31:05 a (Note: Not eligible for a national record because of the course being a net downhill)	Angela Chalmers	April 21, 1996	Vancouver Sun Run	Vancouver, British Columbia, Canada	
15 km (road)	48:17 + Wo	Jadyn Keeler	20 September 2026	World Road Running Championships	Copenhagen, Denmark	
20 km (road)	1:04:30 + Wo	Jadyn Keeler	20 September 2026	World Road Running Championships	Copenhagen, Denmark	
Half marathon	1:08:03 Wo	Jadyn Keeler	20 September 2026	World Road Running Championships	Copenhagen, Denmark	
25 km (road)	1:25:24+	Malindi Elmore	October 16, 2022	Toronto Waterfront Marathon	Toronto, Canada	
30 km (road)	1:42:32+	Malindi Elmore	October 16, 2022	Toronto Waterfront Marathon	Toronto, Canada	
Marathon	2:23:12	Natasha Wodak	September 25, 2022	Berlin Marathon	Berlin, Germany	
50 km (road)	3:22:24	Krista Duchene	May 21, 2021		Hamilton, Canada	
100 km (road)	7:36:39	Julie Hamulecki	August 27, 2022	IAU 100 km World Championships	Bernau bei Berlin Germany	
100 m hurdles	12.46 (+0.7 m/s)	Perdita Felicien	June 19, 2004	Prefontaine Classic	Eugene, United States	
400 m hurdles	52.46	Savannah Sutherland	June 14, 2025	NCAA Division I Championships	Eugene, United States	
2000 m steeplechase	6:13.68	Grace Fetherstonhaugh	September 1, 2024	ISTAF	Berlin, Germany	
3000 m steeplechase	9:20.58	Ceili McCabe	May 17, 2024 (Note: by official result source; 18 May 2024 by Athletics Canada source, a typo)	USATF LA Grand Prix	Los Angeles, United States	
High jump	1.98 m	Debbie Brill	September 2, 1984	IAAF Grand Prix	Rieti, Italy	
Pole vault	4.85 m	Alysha Newman	August 7, 2024	Olympic Games	Paris, France	
Long jump	6.99 m (+0.8 m/s)	Christabel Nettey	May 29, 2015	Prefontaine Classic	Eugene, United States	
Triple jump	14.03 m (+0.8 m/s)	Caroline Ehrhardt	May 28, 2023	Bob Vigars Classic	London, Canada	
Shot put	20.68 m	Sarah Mitton	May 11, 2024	Throws U 2024 Series #3	Fleetwood, United States	
Discus throw	63.58 m	Julia Tunks	April 18, 2026	Mt. SAC Relays	Walnut, United States	
Hammer throw	81.13 m	Camryn Rogers	April 2, 2026	Clyde Littlefield Texas Relays	Austin, United States	
Javelin throw	64.83 m	Elizabeth Gleadle	May 10, 2015	Golden Grand Prix	Kawasaki, Japan	
Heptathlon	6808 pts	Brianne Theisen-Eaton	May 30-31, 2015	Hypo-Meeting	Götzis, Austria	
Heptathlon	100m H (wind) / High jump / Shot put / 200m (wind) / Long jump (wind) / Javelin / 800m; 13.05 (−0.2 m/s) / 1.89 m / 13.73 m / 23.34 / 6.72 m (+0.9 m/s) / 42.96 m / 2:09.37					
5 km walk (road)	21:52.95	Pascale Grand	June 25, 1990		Belfast, United Kingdom	
10,000 m walk (track)	44:16.98 Mx	Rachel Seaman	July 4, 2015	Canadian Championships	Edmonton, Alberta, Canada	
10 km walk (road)	44:26	Janice McCaffrey	May 11, 1996	Oder-Neisse Grand Prix	Eisenhüttenstadt, Germany	
15 km walk (road)	1:07:15+	Rachel Seaman	March 15, 2015	Asian Race Walking Championships	Nomi, Japan	
20,000 m walk (track)	1:38:48.5	Rachel Seaman	July 30, 2010		Toronto, Canada	
20 km walk (road)	1:29:54	Rachel Seaman	March 15, 2015	Asian Race Walking Championships	Nomi, Japan	
4 × 100 m relay	42.17	Canada; Sade McCreath; Audrey Leduc; Marie-Éloïse Leclair; Donna Ntambue	May 3, 2026	World Relays	Gaborone, Botswana	
4 × 200 m relay	1:33.00	Canada; Crystal Emmanuel; Kimberly Hyacinthe; Farah Jacques; Khamica Bingham	April 1, 2017	Florida Relays	Gainesville, United States	
Sprint medley relay (1,1,2,4)	1:40.42	Canada; Shaina Harrison (100 m); Whitney Rowe (100 m); Zoe Sherar (200 m); Alicia Brown (400 m)	April 27, 2019	Penn Relays	Philadelphia, United States	
4 × 400 m relay	3:21.21	Canada; Charmaine Crooks; Jillian Richardson; Molly Killingbeck; Marita Payne	August 11, 1984	Olympic Games	Los Angeles, United States	
4 × 800 m relay	8:14.85	Canada; Melissa Bishop; Karine Belleau-Beliveau; Diane Cummins; Lemlem Bereket	April 27, 2013	Penn Relays	Philadelphia, United States	
4 × 1500 m relay	18:10.75	Canada; Merissa Sexsmith; Rebecca Stallwood; Karin Lockhart; Megan Metcalfe	April 27, 2001	Penn Relays	Philadelphia, United States	

=== Mixed ===
Event	Record	Athlete	Date	Meet	Place	Ref.
4 × 100 m relay	40.07	Canada; Eliezer Adjibi; Marie-Éloïse Leclair; Duan Asemota; Audrey Leduc	May 2, 2026	World Relays	Gaborone, Botswana	
4 × 400 m relay	3:12.43	Canada; Nathan George; Ella Clayton; Ryder Rattee; Dianna Proctor	May 3, 2026	World Relays	Gaborone, Botswana	

== Indoor ==
=== Men ===
Event	Record	Athlete	Date	Meet	Place	Ref.
50 m	5.56 A	Donovan Bailey	9 February 1996		Reno, United States	
50 m	5.55 X	Ben Johnson	31 January 1987		Ottawa, Ontario, Canada	
60 m	6.45	Bruny Surin	13 February 1993	Meeting Pas de Calais	Liévin, France	
60 m	6.41 X	Ben Johnson	7 March 1987	World Indoor Championships	Indianapolis, United States	
100 m	10.61	Robert Esmie	4 February 1998		Tampere, Finland	
150 m	14.99	Donovan Bailey	1 June 1997	Bailey–Johnson 150-metre race	Toronto, Ontario, Canada	
200 m	20.26	Andre De Grasse	14 March 2015	NCAA Division I Championships	Fayetteville, United States	
300 m	32.47	Christopher Morales Williams	13 January 2024	Clemson Invitational	Clemson, United States	
300 m	32.46	Christopher Morales Williams	10 January 2026	Clemson Invitational	Clemson, United States	
400 m	44.49 (Note: ratified by Athletics Canada but not recognized by World Athletics because starting blocks did not comply with its regulations)	Christopher Morales Williams	24 February 2024	SEC Championships	Fayetteville, United States	
600 m	1:15.59	Olivier Desmeules	1 February 2025	Penn State National Open	University Park, United States	
800 m	1:45.50	Marco Arop	27 January 2024	Razorback Invitational	Fayetteville, United States	
1000 m	2:14.74	Marco Arop	4 February 2024	New Balance Indoor Grand Prix	Boston, United States	
1500 m	3:33.39	Foster Malleck	22 February 2026	Saucony Battle for Boston	Boston, United States	
Mile	3:51.33	Aaron Ahl	14 February 2026	BU David Hemery Valentine Invitational	Boston, United States	
2000 m	4:55.35	Cameron Levins	15 February 2014	Millrose Games	New York City, United States	
3000 m	7:38.39	Kieran Lumb	2 December 2023	BU Sharon Colyear-Danville Opener	Boston, United States	
Two miles	8:13.16	Mohammed Ahmed	11 February 2017	Millrose Games	New York City, United States	
5000 m	12:56.87	Mohammed Ahmed	12 February 2022	BU David Hemery Valentine Invitational	Boston, United States	
50 m hurdles	6.25	Mark McKoy	5 March 1986		Kobe, Japan	
60 m hurdles	7.41	Mark McKoy	13 March 1993	World Indoor Championships	Toronto, Ontario, Canada	
High jump	2.35 m	Derek Drouin	9 March 2013	NCAA Division I Championships	Fayetteville, United States	
Pole vault	6.00 m A (Note: outdoor mark ratified as absolute record)	Shawnacy Barber	15 January 2016	Pole Vault Summit	Reno, United States	
Long jump	8.05 m	Damian Warner	18 March 2022	World Championships	Belgrade, Serbia	
Triple jump	17.14 m	Edrick Floreal	11 March 1989		Indianapolis, United States	
Shot put	21.39 m	Dylan Armstrong	13 March 2010	World Indoor Championships	Doha, Qatar	
Weight throw	24.72 m	Scott Russell	8 February 2002		Ames, United States	
Discus throw	58.21 m	Tim Nedow	1 March 2015	World Indoor Throwing	Växjö, Sweden	
Heptathlon	6489 pts	Damian Warner	18–19 March 2022	World Championships	Belgrade, Serbia	
Heptathlon	60m / Long jump / Shot put / High jump / 60m H / Pole vault / 1000m; 6.68 / 8.05 m / 14.89 m / 1.99 m / 7.61 / 4.90 m / 2:39.56					
5000 m walk	18:47.56	Tim Berrett	20 February 1993		Winnipeg, Manitoba, Canada	
4 × 200 m relay	1:24.85	Green and Gold Track and Field Club; Tyler Christopher; Adam Kunkel; Keston Nelson; Neal Hurtubise	27 January 2007	McGill Team Challenge	Montreal, Canada	
4 × 200 m relay	1:23.97	Scarborough Optimists; Williams; Mark McKoy; Johnson; Sharpe	26 February 1983		Sherbrooke, Canada	
4 × 400 m relay	3:07.77	Canada; O'Brian Gibbons; Mark Graham; Dave Anderson; Byron Goodwin	13 March 1993	World Indoor Championships	Toronto, Ontario, Canada	
4 × 800 m relay	7:23.13	Phoenix Athletics Assoc. of Ontario; Kyle Smith; Andrew Maloney; Matt Lincoln; Andrew Heaney	31 January 2009	Penn State National Invitational	University Park, United States	

=== Women ===
Event	Record	Athlete	Date	Meet	Place	Ref.
50 m	6.05+	Philomena Mensah	13 February 2000	Meeting Pas de Calais	Liévin, France	
55 m	6.71+	Audrey Leduc	8 February 2025	Millrose Games	New York City, United States	
60 m	7.02	Philomena Mensah	7 March 1999	World Indoor Championships	Maebashi, Japan	
200 m	23.00 A	Lauren Gale	26 February 2022	Mountain West Championships	Albuquerque, United States	
300 m	36.60 A	Grace Konrad	25 January 2025	Dr. Martin Luther King Jr. Invitational	Albuquerque, United States	
400 m	51.23	Savannah Sutherland	15 March 2025	NCAA Division I Championships	Virginia Beach, United States	
500 m	1:08.40	Sage Watson	3 February 2017	Armory Invitational	New York City, United States	
600 m	1:26.95	Nicole McKenzie	31 January 2026	Penn State National Open	State College, United States	
600 m	1:26.50	Aurora Rynda	26 February 2022	Big Ten Championships	Geneva, United States	
800 m	1:59.87	Jenna Westaway	24 February 2019	BU Last Chance Invitational	Boston, United States	
1000 m	2:33.75	Lucia Stafford	28 January 2023	John Thomas Terrier Classic	Boston, United States	
1500 m	4:00.80+	Gabriela DeBues-Stafford	8 February 2020	Millrose Games	New York, United States	
Mile	4:19.73	Gabriela DeBues-Stafford	8 February 2020	Millrose Games	New York City, United States	
2000 m	5:32.68	Lucia Stafford	19 February 2026	Meeting Hauts-de-France Pas-de-Calais	Liévin, France	
3000 m	8:33.92	Gabriela DeBues-Stafford	6 February 2022	New Balance Indoor Grand Prix	Staten Island, United States	
Two miles	9:22.66	Julie-Anne Staehli	13 February 2021	New Balance Indoor Grand Prix	Staten Island, United States	
5000 m	14:31.38	Gabriela DeBues-Stafford	11 February 2022	BU David Hemery Valentine Invitational	Boston, United States	
50 m hurdles	6.78+	Keturah Anderson	21 February 1999	Meeting Pas de Calais	Liévin, France	
60 m hurdles	7.75	Perdita Felicien	7 March 2004	World Indoor Championships	Budapest, Hungary	
High jump	1.99 m	Debbie Brill	23 January 1982		Edmonton, Alberta, Canada	
Pole vault	4.83 m	Alysha Newman	22 February 2024	All Star Perche	Clermont-Ferrand, France	
Long jump	6.99 m (Note: outdoor mark ratified as absolute record)	Christabel Nettey	19 February 2015	XL Galan	Stockholm, Sweden	
Triple jump	14.02 m (Note: outdoor mark ratified as absolute record)	Tabia Charles	3 March 2007 (Note: by World Athletics source; 25 February 2007 by Athletics Canada source)	Notre Dame Alex Wilson Invitational	Notre Dame, United States	
Shot put	20.68 m	Sarah Mitton	7 February 2025	Indoor Meeting Karlsruhe	Karlsruhe. Germany	
Weight throw	24.06 m	Camryn Rogers	11 March 2022	NCAA Division I Championships	Birmingham, United States	
Pentathlon	4881 pts	Brianne Theisen-Eaton	18 March 2016	World Championships	Portland, United States	
Pentathlon	60m H / High jump / Shot put / Long jump / 800m; 8.04 / 1.85 m / 13.70 m / 6.42 m / 2:09.99					
Mile walk	6:17.29	Rachel Seaman	15 February 2014	Millrose Games	New York City, United States	
3000 m walk	12:23.84	Rachel Seaman	9 February 2014	Athletics Ontario Prep Meet	Toronto, Ontario, Canada	
4 × 200 m relay	1:35.24	Saskatchewan; Hailee Woodhouse; Emma Egert; Selena Keyowski; Grace Igbiki	7 March 2026	U Sports Championships	Winnipeg, Canada	
4 × 400 m relay	3:31.45	Canada; Lauren Gale; Kyra Constantine; Natassha McDonald; Sage Watson	20 March 2022	World Championships	Belgrade, Serbia	
4 × 800 m relay	8:32.36	Toronto Varsity Blues; Rachel Jewett; Honor Walmsley; Sasha Gollish; Gabriela DeBues-Stafford	13 March 2015	USPORTS Championships	Windsor, Canada	
