= Cameron Levins =

Canadian long-distance runner

Cam Levins
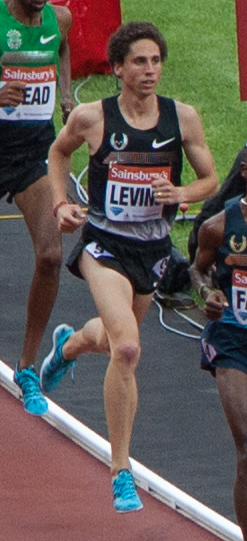
- Levins in 2013

Personal information
- Born: Cameron Levins; March 28, 1989 (age 37) Campbell River, British Columbia, Canada
- Employers: Asics (2023–) before: Nike, Hoka One One
- Height: 1.78 m (5 ft 10 in)
- Weight: 62 kg (137 lb)

Sport
- Country: Canada
- Sport: Track and field
- Event: Long-distance running
- University team: Southern Utah Thunderbirds
- Coached by: Jim Finlayson, Eric Houle

Achievements and titles
- Personal bests: 800 m: 1:49.73 (Provo 2016); 1500 m: 3:36.88 (Los Angeles 2013); 5000 m: 13:15.19 (Eugene 2013); 10,000 m: 27:07.51 (Eugene 2015); Indoors; Mile: 3:54.74i (New York 2015); 2000 m: 4:55.35i NR (New York 2014); 3000 m: 7:41.59i (Boston 2014); Road; 10 km: 28:11 NR (Paris 2024); Half marathon: 1:00:18 NR (Vancouver 2023); Marathon: 2:05:36 AR (Tokyo 2023)
Medal record
Men's Athletics
Representing Canada
Commonwealth Games
Bronze medal – third place	2014 Glasgow	10,000 m

Cameron Levins (born March 28, 1989) is a Canadian long-distance runner. He won the bronze medal in the 10,000 metres at the 2014 Commonwealth Games. Levins had the best-Canadian finish ever of fourth in the marathon at the 2022 World Championships, setting a new Canadian record. He was formerly the North American record holder for the marathon and Canadian holder for the half-marathon and is the current Canadian record holder for the marathon.

Levins represented Canada at the 2012 London and 2020 Tokyo Olympics and 2024 Paris Olympics.

== Career ==
Cam Levins comes from Black Creek and Courtenay, British Columbia.

In college, he competed for the Southern Utah Thunderbirds under coach Eric Houle. In 2012, he won the 5000 m and 10,000 m at the NCAA Championships. For his efforts, he also won the Bowerman award as the top collegiate track and field athlete, becoming the first Canadian to do so.

He qualified for the 2012 London Olympics in the 5000 meters and 10,000 meters events at the 2012 Canadian Olympic Trials in Calgary, Alberta, where he took first place in the 5000 m. At the Games, Levins finished 14th in the 5000 m in a time of 13:51.87 and 11th in the 10,000 m with a time of 27:40.68, despite catching the flu just before the finals.

He finished 14th in the 10,000 meters at the 2013 World Championships in Athletics in Moscow.

Levins was the Men's 2012 Bowerman Award winner, which is the NCAA's annual award to the most outstanding collegiate athlete in track & field. He was the first Canadian recipient of the award.

In the 2014 Commonwealth Games in Glasgow, he led down the final stretch with a "spectacular kick" but finished third in 27:56.23, less than one-tenth of a second behind winner Moses Kipsiro.

On October 21, 2018, making his marathon debut, Levins broke Jerome Drayton's 43-year-old Canadian men's record for the marathon, finishing fourth in the 29th annual Toronto Waterfront Marathon in 2:09:25, a 44-second improvement on the previous national record.

He represented Canada at the 2020 Tokyo Olympics, placing 72nd in the Olympic marathon in a time of 2:28:43.

Levins finished fourth in the marathon at the 2022 World Athletics Championships held in Eugene, Oregon in a new Canadian men's record time of 2:07:09, taking two minutes off his previous national record set in 2018; it was also the best Canadian finish ever in the event.

On February 12, 2023, he broke Ben Flanagan's 2022 Canadian record in the half marathon with a time of 60:18 at the First Half in Vancouver, becoming the first Canadian to break the 61-minute barrier in the event (Flanagan's record was 61:00).

On March 5, 2023, Levins improved his own Canadian marathon record by more than 90 seconds to break the North American record and finish fifth at the Tokyo Marathon. He ran a time of 2:05:36, taking two seconds off the previous area best.

Levins would make his New York City Marathon debut on November 5. He came through 5 km and 10 km with the lead group in 15:29 and 30:39 before being dropped from the lead group after 13 km. After running detached from the leaders for several kilometres, he would drop out of the race around 20 km.

On February 7, 2024, Levins, alongside fellow marathoner Malindi Elmore, received an early selection to represent Canada in the marathon at the 2024 Olympics.

== Competition record ==
Representing Canada
Year	Competition	Venue	Position	Event	Time	Notes
2011	World Cross Country Championships	Punta Umbría, Spain	56th	Senior race	36:36	
2012	Olympic Games	London, United Kingdom	14h	5000 m	13:51.87	
2012	Olympic Games	London, United Kingdom	11th	10,000 m	27:40.68	
2013	World Cross Country Championships	Bydgoszcz, Poland	41st	Senior race	34:27	
2013	World Championships	Moscow, Russia	14th	10,000 m	27:47.89	SB
2014	World Indoor Championships	Sopot, Poland	8th	3000 m	7:57.37	
2014	Commonwealth Games	Glasgow, United Kingdom	3rd	10,000 m	27:56.23	
2015	World Championships	Beijing, China	24th (h)	5000 m	13:48.72	
2015	World Championships	Beijing, China	14th	10,000 m	28:15.19	
2016	World Indoor Championships	Portland, OR, United States	14th (h)	3000 m	7:54.81	
2018	World Half Marathon Championships	Valencia, Spain	30th	Half marathon	1:02:15	
2021	Olympic Games	Sapporo, Japan	71st	Marathon	2:28:43	
2022	World Championships	Eugene, OR, United States	4th	Marathon	2:07:09	
2025	World Championships	Tokyo, Japan	12th	Marathon	2:11:07	
Road races
2018	Houston Half Marathon	Houston, TX, United States	37th	Half marathon	1:05:00	
2018	Rock 'n' Roll Half Marathon	Philadelphia, PA, United States	3rd	Half marathon	1:03:09	
2018	Toronto Waterfront Marathon	Toronto, Canada	4th	Marathon	2:09:25	
2019	NYC Half Marathon	New York, NY, United States	18th	Half marathon	1:05:10	
2019	Toronto Waterfront Marathon	Toronto, Canada	12th	Marathon	2:15:01	SB
2020	London Marathon	London, United Kingdom	DNF	Marathon	DNF	
2020	The Marathon Project	Chandler, AZ, United States	15th	Marathon	2:12:15	
2021	S7 Marathon	Fürstenfeld, Austria	1st	Marathon	2:10:14	SB
2022	Canadian Half Marathon Championships	Winnipeg, Canada	1st	Half Marathon	1:03:23	
2022	Valencia Half Marathon	Valencia, Spain	19th	Half marathon	1:01:04	
2023	First Half	Vancouver, Canada	1st	Half marathon	1:00:18	NR
2023	Tokyo Marathon	Tokyo, Japan	5th	Marathon	2:05:36	AR
2023	Canadian 10K Championships	Ottawa, Canada	2nd	10 km	28:40	
2023	Canadian Half Marathon Championships	Winnipeg, Canada	1st	Half marathon	1:01:42	
2023	Victoria Half Marathon	Victoria, Canada	1st	Half marathon	1:01:18	
2023	NYC Marathon	New York, NY, United States	DNF	Marathon	DNF	
2024	Asics Festival of Running	Paris, France	6th	10 km	28:11	NR
2026	World Road Running Championships	Copenhagen, Denmark	35th	Half marathon	1:01:49	

== Career highlights ==
- Two-time NCAA Champion:
  - 2012: 5000m, 10,000m
- 14-time Summit League Champion:
  - 2008–09: 1500m
  - 2009–10: XC, mile (indoor), 3000m (indoor)
  - 2010–11: 1500m, 5000m
  - 2011–12: XC, 800m (indoor), mile (indoor), 3000m (indoor), 5000m (indoor), 1500m, 5000m, 10,000m
- 11-time Canadian Champion
  - XC: 2010, 2011, 2012
  - 5000m: 2012, 2013, 2014, 2015
  - 5 km: 2017
  - Half marathon: 2022, 2023
  - Marathon: 2018

Canadian record holder for:

- 2000 metres (indoor) – 4:55.35 (New York City 2014) NR
- 10 km – 28:11 (Paris 2024) NR (jointly held with Ben Flanagan)
- Half marathon – 1:00:18 (Vancouver 2023) NR
- Marathon – 2:05:36 (Tokyo 2023) AR 2023-2025

== See also ==
- Canadian records in track and field

Awards
Preceded by (Zimbabwe) Ngoni Makusha	The Bowerman (men's winner); 2012	Succeeded by (Canada) Derek Drouin
