= Lanni Marchant =

Canadian long-distance runner

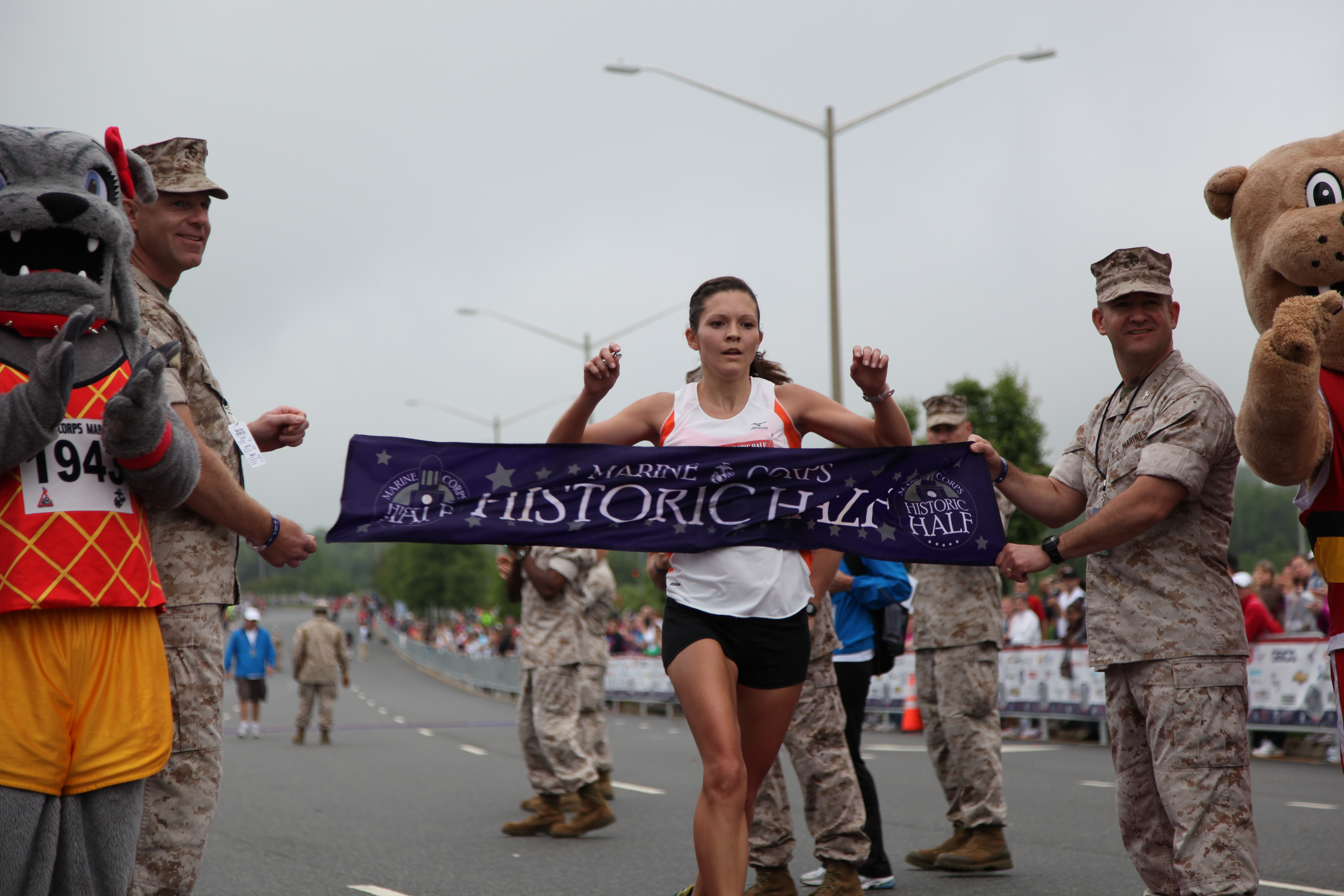

Personal information
- Born: 11 April 1984 (age 42) London, Ontario, Canada
- Height: 1.55 m (5 ft 1 in)
- Weight: 48 kg (106 lb)

Sport
- Sport: Long distance running
Medal record
Women's athletics
Representing Canada
Pan American Games
Bronze medal – third place	2015 Toronto	10,000 m
- Updated on July 2014

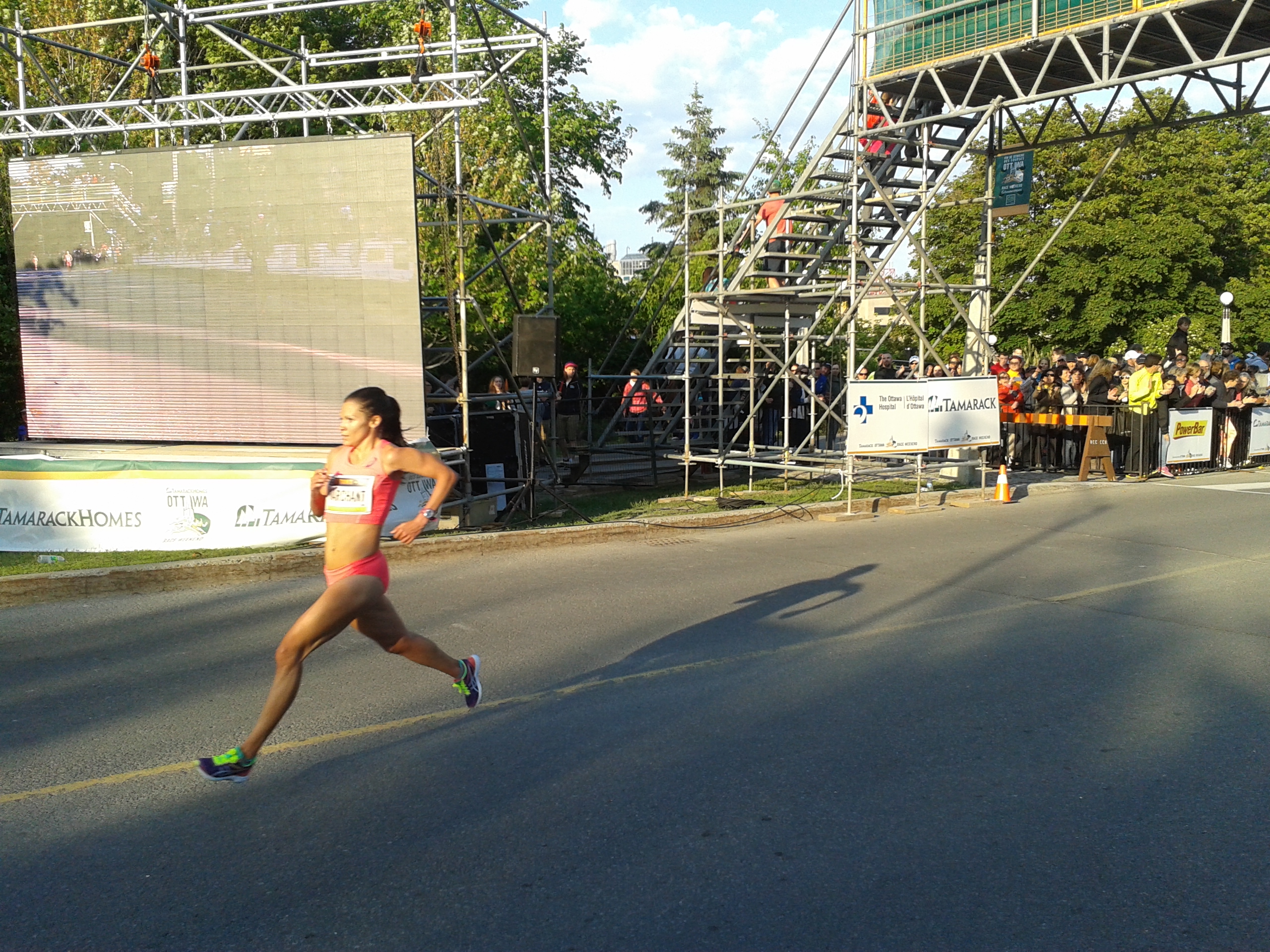
Lanni Marchant approaching the finish of the Canadian 10 km Road Race Championships at the Ottawa Race Weekend.

Lanni Marchant (born 11 April 1984) is a Canadian long distance runner from London, Ontario. On October 20, 2013, Marchant set the Canadian women's marathon record at the Scotiabank Toronto Waterfront Marathon, beating the 28-year-old national record by running it in exactly 2:28:00. This record held until March 10, 2019 when Rachel Cliff established the new marathon national record in 2:26:56. Marchant participated at the 2016 Summer Olympics both in the 10,000 metres and marathon events.

== Early life ==
The middle of seven children (five girls and two boys) from London, Ontario, Canada, her first sport was ice skating.

In elementary school she ran as part of her curriculum and as a great way to cross train for figure skating. By the time she hit high school, she also saw it as a way to make new friends. In grade 10, Marchant joined the high school cross-country team, and quickly replaced her skating time with running time. Marchant decided to quit skating the following holiday season and joined The London Western Track and Field Club.

== Running career and education ==
Marchant kept up her running throughout high school, racing at track meets, and regional championships, eventually earning a scholarship to the University of Tennessee at Chattanooga. After a frustrating freshman cross country season, she won her first conference championship in the Steeplechase, and went on to win several more titles in the 5,000m, 10,000m, and in cross country. In 2007, after representing the Mocs for 4 seasons, Marchant graduated from UTC with an economics pre-law degree. She moved on to law school at the University of Ottawa, and Michigan State University, graduating in May 2011 with two law degrees. It was during this time that she turned her focus towards road racing, and developed an affinity for the open road. With a hefty work load, and ever increasing mileage, she has claimed "the tenacity I draw on to run marathons was forged during this time".

== International career ==
Marchant has represented Canada at the Chiba Ekiden relays (2008, 2010, 2011, 2012), at the 2013 World Championships in the marathon event, and at the 2014 Commonwealth Games in Glasgow, Scotland, in the marathon event. Marchant studied law at Michigan State University where she also ran. Marchant placed fourth at the Canadian 10k championships in 2011. The same year, she clocked a 2:44 at the Chicago Marathon. In 2012, Marchant finished the Rotterdam Marathon with a time of 2:31:50. While Marchant's time met the IAAF qualifying standard of 2:37, it did not meet the Canadian Olympic "A" standard of 2:29:55, so she was not eligible to represent Canada at the 2012 London Olympics. A subsequent appeal was denied by Athletics Canada.

In 2013, Marchant represented Canada in the women's marathon at the 14th IAAF World Championships in Moscow. She finished in 44th place with a time of 3:01:51, citing intense heat, and humidity as causative factors. Suffering from intense leg cramps, she repeatedly stabbed her leg with a safety pin in an attempt to correct her condition. It did not work.

Marchant followed this up by setting the Canadian Marathon Record at the Scotiabank Toronto Waterfront Marathon in October 2013. Breaking a 28 year old record and running 2:28:00. (https://blog.utc.edu/news/2013/12/alumna-breaks-canadian-marathon-record/)

In March 2014, Marchant sent the Canadian half marathon record (https://runningmagazine.ca/uncategorized/lanni-marchant-breaks-canadian-half-marathon-record/).

In 2014, she was the fastest female Canadian runner at the Boston Marathon, where she had a time of 2:30:34. Also in 2014, at the Tom King Half-Marathon, Marchant clocked a Canadian half-marathon record time of 1:10:47.

Marchant placed fourth in the women's marathon event at the 2014 Commonwealth Games, in Glasgow, Scotland, with a time of 2:31:14.

In 2015, Marchant won bronze on home soil at the Pan Am Games in the 10,000m. (https://gomocs.com/news/2015/7/29/XC_0729152203.aspx)

In July 2016 she was officially named to Canada's Olympic team.

In April 2025, Marchant set the women's course record (1:12:45) at the Christie Clinic Illinois Half Marathon in Champaign, Illinois. (https://illinoismarathon.com/races/half-marathon/)

== Awards ==
Marchant was inducted into the University of Tennessee at Chattanooga Hall of Fame on February 20, 2015.
