= Athletics Canada =

Sport national governing body

Athletics Canada / Athletisme Canada
- Jurisdiction: National
- Founded: 1884; 141 years ago
- Affiliation: World Athletics
- Regional affiliation: NACAC
- Headquarters: Ottawa, Ontario
- Chairman: Helen Manning
- CEO: Mathieu Gentès
- Sponsor: Sport Canada

Official website
- www.athletics.ca
- (Canada)

Athletics Canada or AC (French: Athlétisme Canada) is the national governing body for athletics in Canada, which includes track and field, cross-country running, road running, and race walking. Based in Ottawa, Ontario, Athletics Canada is a non-profit organization. The organization is led by an elected board of directors, with a head chair, currently Helen Manning.

Athletics Canada is involved in many aspects of the sport at the local, national, and international level – providing the rules, officials, coaching education, sports science and athlete development, youth programs, masters (age 40+) competition, and an annual meeting. It also organizes annual Outdoor Track and Field Championships and Indoor Track and Field Championships.

Athletics Canada is a member of WA, IOC, IPC, EAA, NACAC, JDFL, CP-ISRA, CGF, ISBA, FISU and WADA.

== History ==
The sport governing body for track and field in Canada, which is now called Athletics Canada, was established in 1884. It is one of the oldest affiliated bodies with World Athletics (formerly the IAAF). Only the association of Great Britain (1880) has been in existence for a longer period of time. New Zealand followed in 1887 and the United States in 1888.

Following preliminary meetings on April 11, 1884, where the athletics associations of Quebec and Ontario sent some 50 representatives to meet at the Toronto Fencing Club, the principal business was to ratify a constitution for the newly formed Canadian Amateur Athletics Association, the forerunner of Athletics Canada. Founding fathers of the organization included W.C. Maltby, John Massey, and C.W. Martin.

The first Canadian Track and Field Championships were held in Montreal at the Montreal Lacrosse Groundson September 27 of that year, and 20 years later, Étienne Desmarteau would win the first Olympic gold medal for Canada. George Orton, a Canadian, had won an Olympic gold in 1900, but he was competing at these second Games in Paris on an invitation from the United States.

From 1909 until the fall of 1967, the organization was known as the Canadian Track and Field Association (CTFA). However, it operated under the umbrella of the AAU of C (Amateur Athletic Union of Canada). In 1968, the IAAF (now WA) officially recognized the CTFA as an autonomous group and not part of the AAU of C. The AAU of C subsequently dissolved itself in the early 1970s as all national federations in the different sports went their own ways.

On June 17, 1990, at the annual general meeting of the CTFA, a motion was adopted to change the name to Athletics Canada. The Department of Consumer and Corporate Affairs of the Government of Canada accepted this name change officially on April 12, 1991.

Over the past two decades, Athletics Canada has welcomed under its umbrella the high performance athletes for four disability groups: wheelchair athletes joined the association in 1997 with blind, cerebral palsy, amputee athletes following in 2002.

Inclusion of these disability groups was a natural step given that the focus of the association broadened to include the delivery of similar services to all track and field high performance athletes. In the current structure, provincial disability organizations report to their respective national associations - the Canadian Wheelchair Sports Association, the Canadian Blind Sports Association, and the Canadian Cerebral Palsy Sports Association - while Athletics Canada works directly with the national offices of each disability group.

In 2009 Gordon Orlikow was named Chairman of the Board of Athletics Canada. He held the position until 2017, and led the Canadian delegation at the 2017 IAAF World Championships & Congress.

== Organization ==
Athletics Canada (119472975rr0001) is registered with the Canada Revenue Agency as a Canadian amateur athletic association (RCAAA). The agency can issue official donation receipts and are eligible to receive gifts from registered charities since March 29, 1972.

== Provincial governing bodies ==
Currently there is a branch for all provinces and territories in Canada except for Nunavut.

Province	Federation	Website Link
British Columbia	British Columbia Athletics Association	http://www.bcathletics.org
Alberta	Athletics Alberta	http://www.athleticsalberta.com
Saskatchewan	Saskatchewan Athletics Association	http://www.saskathletics.ca/
Manitoba	Athletics Manitoba	http://www.athleticsmanitoba.com
Ontario	Athletics Ontario	http://www.athleticsontario.ca
Quebec	Quebec Athletics Federation (Fédération Québécoise d'Athlétisme)	https://www.athletisme-quebec.ca/
New Brunswick	Athletics New Brunswick	http://www.anb.ca
Nova Scotia	Athletics Nova Scotia	http://www.athleticsnovascotia.ca
Prince Edward Island	Prince Edward Island Athletics Association	http://www.athleticspei.ca/
Newfoundland and Labrador	Newfoundland and Labrador Athletics Association	http://www.nlaa.ca
Yukon	Athletics Yukon	http://www.athleticsyukon.ca
Northwest Territories	Sport North Federation	https://sportnorth.com/

== Athletics Canada Championships ==
- Canadian Track and Field Championships
- Canadian Indoor Track and Field Championships
- Canadian Cross Country Championships
- Canadian Half Marathon Championships
- Canadian Marathon Championships
- Canadian 5Km Road Race Championships
- Canadian 10Km Road Race Championships
- AC Indoor Open
- Legion National Youth Track and Field Championships

== University of Guelph abuse scandal ==
On February 8, 2020, Canadian news outlet The Globe and Mail published a story on the alleged sexual abuse by national coach Dave Scott-Thomas, he was also employed at the University of Guelph as the head of the track and field program and operator of a now-defunct track club, Speed River. The victim of Scott-Thomas's abuse was running prodigy Megan Brown, who was in high school and later a student-athlete at the university at the time of the abuse.

The University of Guelph fired Scott-Thomas as its track and field head coach in December 2019.

Athletics Canada issued a statement regarding the story on the day it was published.

The Athletics Canada Athlete Council, a group of elected athletes which represent athletes who compete in the sport, released a statement two days later, condemning the organizations' lack of action.

== See also ==
- Sports in Canada
- Canadian records in track and field
- Canadian Track and Field Championships
- Canadian Marathon Championships
- Canadian Half Marathon Championships
