= Eric Gillis =

Canadian athlete

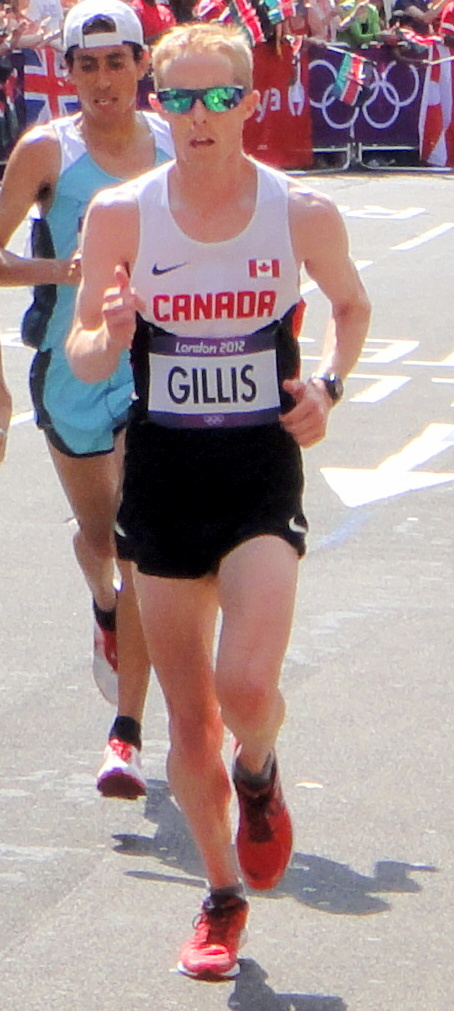
- Eric Gillis in the marathon at the 2012 Summer Olympics

Personal information
- Nationality: Canadian
- Born: March 8, 1980 (age 46) Antigonish, Nova Scotia
- Height: 5 ft 7 in (1.70 m)
- Weight: 127 lb (58 kg)

Sport
- Sport: Running
- Event(s): 10,000 metres, half marathon, marathon
- College team: St. Francis Xavier X-Men

Eric Gillis (born March 8, 1980) is a Canadian athlete. He was born and raised in the community of Antigonish, Nova Scotia. He resides in Antigonish, Nova Scotia as the head coach of the St. Francis Xavier University cross country and track teams.

== Sporting career ==
Gillis ran collegiately for the St. Francis Xavier University X-Men from 1998 until 2004, during which time he individually won the CIS Cross Country Championship and competed at the World University Games twice. Since becoming a professional, Gillis has experienced much national and international success during his athletics career. He represented Canada at the 2008 Beijing Olympics in the 10,000m, as well as the marathon at the 2012 London Olympics and 2016 Rio Olympics.

Gillis qualified for the London Olympics on October 16, 2011, with a 2:11:28 finish at the Toronto Waterfront Marathon. In 2016 he was inducted into the StFX Sports Hall of Fame and in 2017 was named assistant coach of the X-Men Cross Country and Track and Field Teams, and become the head coach in 2018 respectively.

=== Career highlights ===
- 2016: 10th-place finish Olympic marathon (2:12:29)
- 2016: Vancouver Sun Run winner, time 28:52
- 2012: Competed at the Summer Olympics men's marathon event
- 2011: Vancouver Sun Run winner, time 29:05.
- 2008: Canadian 10,000 m Championships, Gold
- 2008: Canadian Cross Country Championships, Silver
- 2008: Competed at the Summer Olympics 10,000 m event, finishing 33rd.
- 2007: Canadian Championships, Bronze
- 2007: Canadian 10,000 m Championships, Gold
- 2005: Canadian Championships, Bronze
- 2003: Canadian Interuniversity Sport Cross Country Gold Medalist
- Multiple Antigonish Casket Newspaper "Athlete of the Week" Awards

== 2008 Summer Olympics ==
Gillis went to the Beijing Summer Olympics as a member of Team Canada. He competed in the 10000 metres event on August 17, 2008, in the Beijing National Stadium. Though he was aiming to finish among the top 20, he finished 33rd overall with a time of 29:08.10.

== 2012 Summer Olympics ==
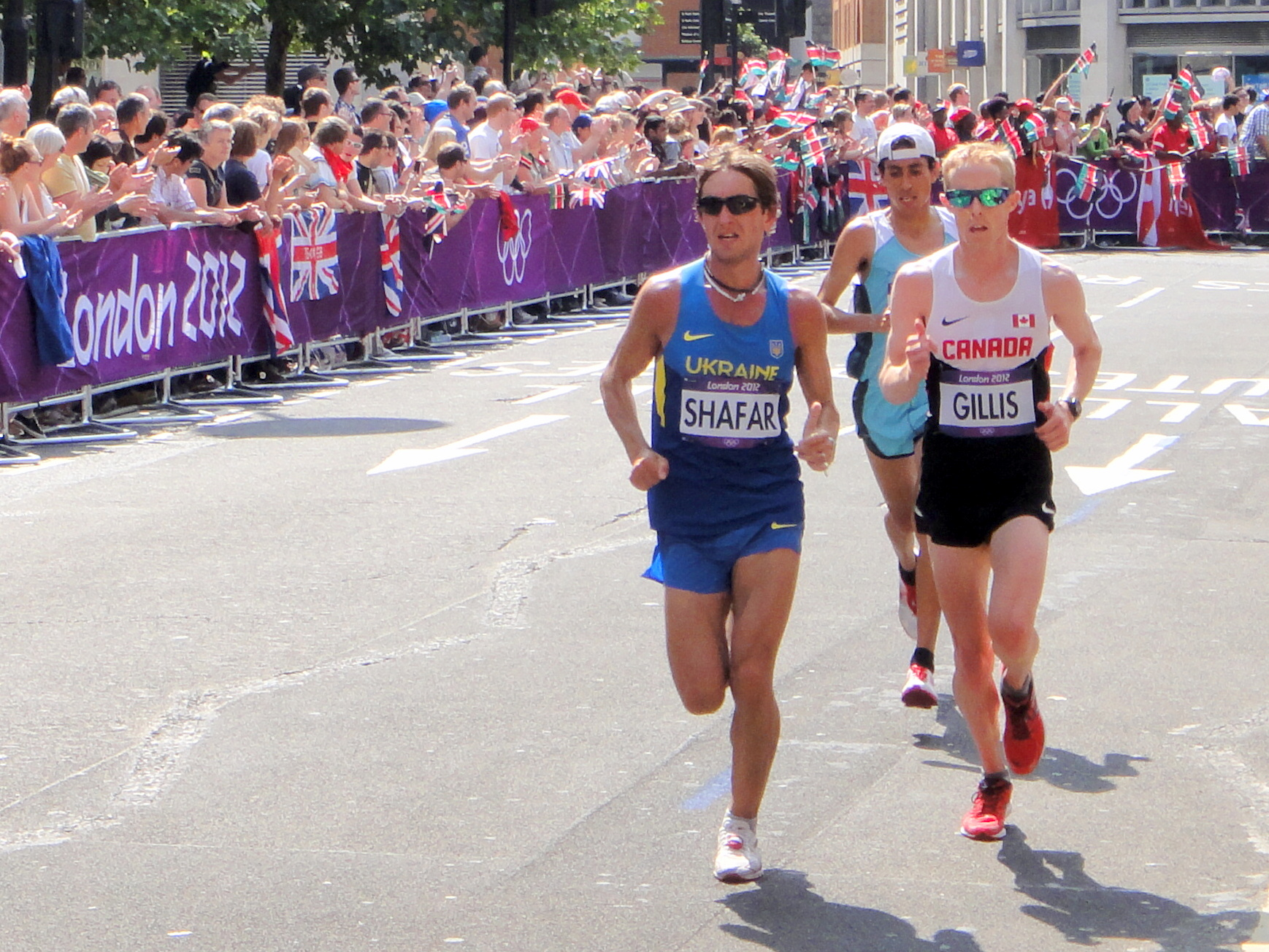
Vitaliy Shafar (Ukraine) and Eric Gillis (Canada) - London 2012 men's marathon

At the 2012 Summer Olympics, Gillis competed in the men's marathon. He finished in 22nd place with a time of 2:16:00.

== 2016 Summer Olympics ==
In July 2016, he was named to Canada's Olympic team. He finished 10th in the marathon in a time of 2:12:29, the first Canadian man to finish in the top 10 in the Olympic marathon since 1976.
