= Hobbs Kessler =

American middle-distance runner (born 2003)

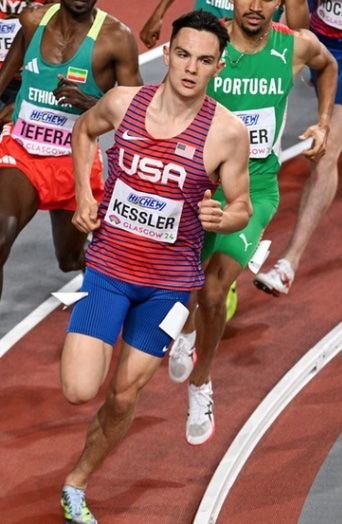
- Kessler at the 2024 World Indoor Championships

Personal information
- Born: March 15, 2003 (age 23)
- Home town: Ann Arbor, Michigan, U.S.
- Education: Community High School

Sport
- Sport: Athletics
- Events: 1500 metres, Mile
- Club: Adidas; Very Nice Track Club
- Turned pro: 2021

Achievements and titles
- Olympic finals: 2024 Paris; 1500 m, 5th
- National finals: 2025 Eugene; 1500 m, 4th; 2024 Eugene; 1500 m, Bronze; 800 m, Silver; 2023 Eugene; 1500 m, 6th
- Personal bests: Outdoor; 800 m: 1:43.64 (Eugene 2024); 1000 m: 2:16.46 AU20R (Monaco 2022); 1500 m: 3:29.45 (Paris 2024); Indoor; 1500 m: 3:31.89+i (New York City 2025); Mile: 3:46.90i (New York City 2025); 2000 m: 4:48.79i WR (Boston 2026); 3000 m: 7:35.06i (New York City 2025); Road; Mile: 3:54.34 (Herzogenaurach 2025)
Medal record
Men's athletics
Representing the United States
World Indoor Championships
Bronze medal – third place	2024 Glasgow	1500 m
World Road Running Championships
Gold medal – first place	2023 Riga	1 mile

Hobbs Kessler (born March 15, 2003) is an American middle-distance runner who has held the world record holder in the short track 2000 meters since 2026. Kessler turned professional directly after high school and competes for Adidas. Kessler holds the North American U20 record in the 1500 meters and briefly held the road mile world record set at the 2023 World Road Running Championships, before it was broken by Emmanuel Wanyonyi.

At the 2024 World Athletics Indoor Championships, Kessler won a bronze medal in the 1500 m. At the 2024 Summer Olympics, he finished fifth in the 1500 meter final.

== Running career ==
=== High school ===
Kessler competed for Skyline High School in Ann Arbor, Michigan, as the high school he attended for academics, Community High School, did not offer competitive sports. During Kessler's senior year, his father was the high school track coach. However, wanting to keep a non-professional relationship with his son, he had the renowned University of Michigan coach Ron Warhurst plan most of Hobbs' training. This allowed Hobbs to train with professional runners Nick Willis and Mason Ferlic for harder workouts while still allowing him to do easier efforts with his high school teammates.

In September 2020, Hobbs committed to compete at Northern Arizona University.

On February 7, 2021, Kessler broke the U.S. high school indoor mile record by running 3:57.66 at the Randal Tyson Track Center where he placed third in the race. This broke his previous mile personal best by more than ten seconds and made him the 12th American high schooler to break 4 minutes in the mile. During the outdoor track season, he went on to run 8:39.04 for 2-miles at the NSAF USA Meet of Champions in Myrtle Beach, becoming the No. 4 American high schooler at that distance, as well as winning his first state title in the 1600 m.

On May 29, 2021, Hobbs ran a 3:34.36 1500 m at the Portland Track Festival. Despite still being in high school, his time was faster than the NCAA record at the time. His time also broke the North American U20 and U.S. high school records. The performance also qualified him to compete at the 2021 US Olympic Trials.

He was named the 2021 Gatorade National Track and Field Athlete of the Year.

=== Professional ===
Only a day before he competed at the U.S. Olympic Trials in June 2021, Kessler turned professional, signing with Adidas. By turning professional, Kessler forfeited his commitment to compete for Northern Arizona University.

Kessler currently trains under the tutelage of Ron Warhurst in Ann Arbor as part of the Very Nice Track Club. His training partners include Olympians Bryce Hoppel, Nick Willis and Mason Ferlic, as well as other professional runners Ben Flanagan, Morgan Beadlescomb, Nathan Mylenek, Natalie Cizmas, Alsu Lenneman, and Charlie Da’Vall Grice.

==== 2023 ====
On October 1, 2023, Kessler broke the 1 mile road record by running 3:56.13 in Riga at the World Road Running Championships.

On December 9, 2023, Kessler placed 3rd in the Kalakaua Merrie Mile, in a time of 3:57.12.

At the 2023 New Balance Indoor Grand Prix, Kessler took first in the 1500 m, running an indoor personal best of 3:33.66 by fending off a hard charging Jake Wightman in the final metres.

==== 2024 ====
On February 11, Kessler placed second to Yared Nuguse in the Wanamaker Mile at the Millrose Games, in a personal best time of 3:48.66. His run placed him 4th on the all-time indoor mile list. The following week, Kessler competed at the US Indoor Championships in the 1500 m where he placed 2nd behind Cole Hocker in a time of 3:38.76. By placing in the top two, he qualified to represent the United States at the 2024 World Indoor Championships in Glasgow.

At the 2024 World Indoor Championships, in the 1500 meters, Kessler ran at the front of the field for the majority of the race before getting out kicked by Cole Hocker and Geordie Beamish as he finished in 3rd for the bronze medal.

On 27 April, Kessler competed in the road mile at the adizero Road to Records event in Herzogenaurach, Germany. He finished second in the race, in a time of 3:56.18. Finishing first was Emmanuel Wanyonyi of Kenya, who broke Kessler's previous world record of 3:56.13 by running 3:54.56.

At his second Olympic Trials, Kessler placed third in the 1500 m behind Cole Hocker and Yared Nuguse qualifying for the 2024 Olympics and finishing in a personal best time of 3:31.53. Kessler also contested the 800 m, winning his semi-final heat in a personal best time of 1:43.71. In the final, he finished second behind his training partner and 2024 Indoor World 800 m Champion Bryce Hoppel, again lowering his personal best, this time to 1:43.64, and qualifying for the Olympics in a second event.

On August 6, Kessler finished 5th in the 1500 meter final at the 2024 Paris Olympics, in a personal best time of 3:29.45. His compatriots Yared Nuguse and Cole Hocker finished 3rd and 1st respectively, marking the first time in 112 years that two Americans were on the men's 1500 meter podium. He also competed in the 800 m, but was eliminated in the semifinals, finishing sixth in his heat.

==== 2025–present ====
On February 8, in the Wanamaker Mile at the Millrose Games, Kessler finished second to Yared Nuguse, in a personal best time of 3:46.90 while Nuguse set a new world indoor record of 3:46.63. Both Kessler and Nuguse were under Yomif Kejelcha's previous world record of 3:47.01 set in 2019. En route to the mile, Kessler split 3:31.89 for 1500 meters, an indoor personal best.

At the 2025 USATF Outdoor Championships, Kessler finished fourth in the 1500 meters.

On January 24, 2026, at the New Balance Indoor Grand Prix, Kessler outkicked Grant Fisher to break Kenenisa Bekele's world record of 4:49.99 in the short track 2000 meters, clocking 4:48.79.

== Competition record ==
=== International Competitions ===
Year	Competition	Venue	Position	Event	Time
Representing the United States
2023	World Road Running Championships	Riga, Latvia	1st	Mile	3:56.13
2024	World Indoor Championships	Glasgow Arena	3rd	1500 m	3:36.72
2024	Olympic Games	Stade de Paris	6th (sf)	800 m	1:46.20
2024	Olympic Games	Stade de Paris	5th	1500 m	3:29.45

=== National Championships ===
Year	Competition	Venue	Position	Event	Time
Representing Adidas (2021–present)
2021	US Olympic Trials	Hayward Field	19th (sf)	1500 m	3:45.50
2022	USA Outdoor Track and Field Championships	Hayward Field	22nd (h)	1500 m	3:42.56
2023	USA Outdoor Track and Field Championships	Hayward Field	6th	1500 m	3:36.08
2024	USA Indoor Track and Field Championships	Albuquerque Convention Center	2nd	1500 m	3:38.76
2024	US Olympic Trials	Hayward Field	3rd	1500 m	3:31.53
2024	US Olympic Trials	Hayward Field	2nd	800 m	1:43.64
2025	USA Indoor Track and Field Championships	Ocean Breeze Athletic Complex	1st	1500 m	3:38.82
2025	USA Indoor Track and Field Championships	Ocean Breeze Athletic Complex	1st	3000 m	7:38.00
2025	USA Outdoor Track and Field Championships	Hayward Field	4th	1500 m	3:31.12

=== Circuit performances ===
Grand Slam Track results
Slam	Race group	Event	Pl.	Time	Prize money
2025 Philadelphia Slam	Short distance	800 m	4th	1:45.60	US$20,000
2025 Philadelphia Slam	Short distance	1500 m	3rd	3:34.91	US$20,000

== Personal bests ==
Surface	Event	Time	Date	Venue	Notes
Indoor track	1500 m	3:31.89+	February 8, 2025	The Armory	
Indoor track	Mile	3:46.90	February 8, 2025	The Armory	2nd all time
Indoor track	2000 m	4:48.79	January 24, 2026	The Track at New Balance	World record
Indoor track	3000 m	7:39.00	January 27, 2023	Boston University	
Outdoor track	800 m	1:43.64	June 30, 2024	Hayward Field	
Outdoor track	1000 m	2:16.46	August 10, 2022	Louis II Stadium	AU20R
Outdoor track	1500 m	3:29.45	August 6, 2024	Stade de France	
Outdoor track	Mile	3:58.73	August 24, 2022	Tooting Bec Athletics Track	
Outdoor track	Two Miles	8:39.04	March 25, 2021	Doug Shaw Memorial Stadium	
Road	Road Mile	3:54.34	April 26, 2025	Herzogenaurach	

== Rock climbing career ==
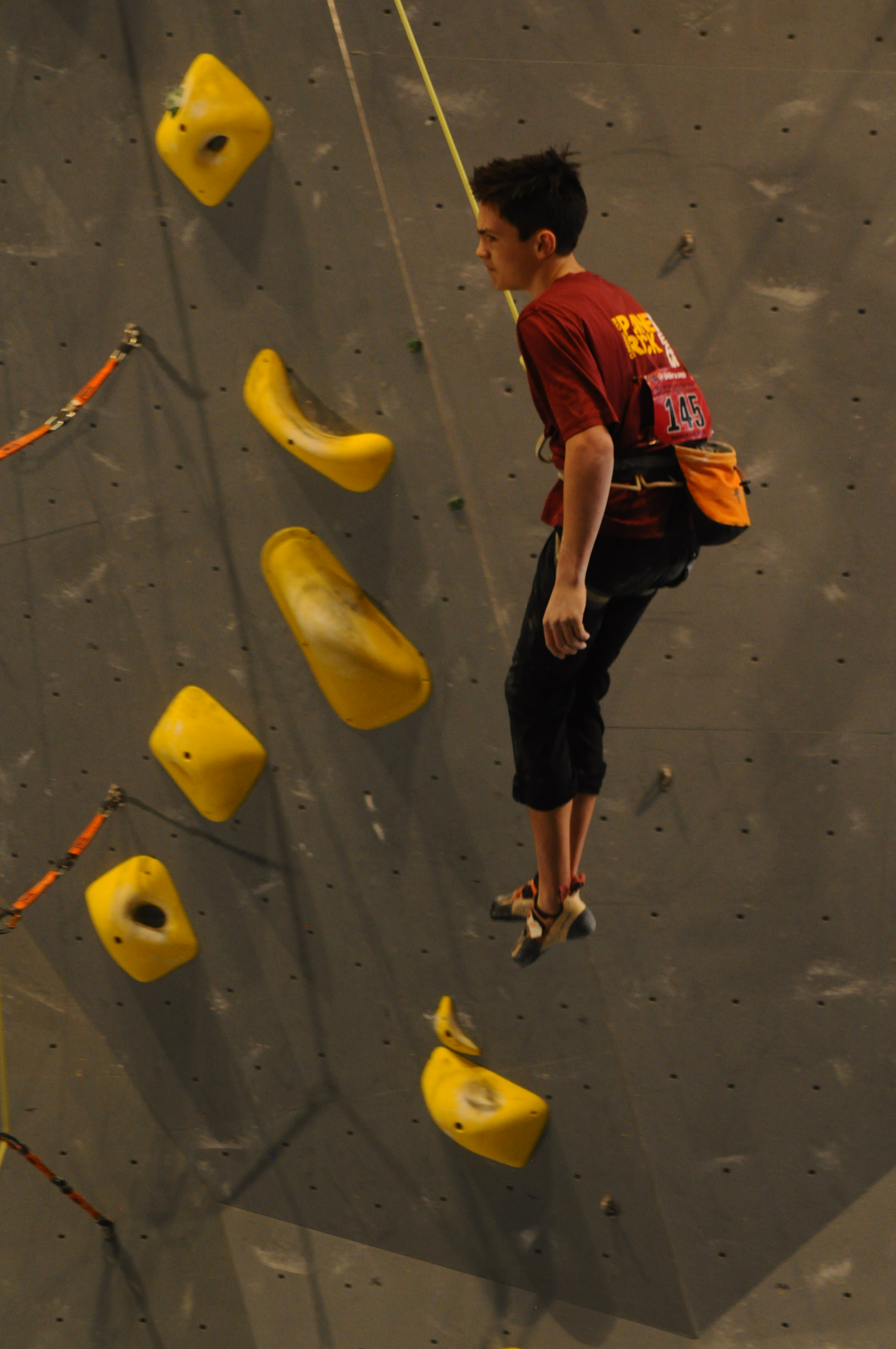
Kessler at the 2019 Sport & Speed Open Nationals.

Kessler was a national-caliber rock climber in his youth. He represented the United States several times, including at the 2019 IFSC Climbing Youth World Championships in Arco, Italy where he placed 34th in the Lead Youth A Male category. In March 2019, he climbed Southern Smoke (5.14c) at Red River Gorge in Kentucky—his hardest route so far. He's stated that one of his goals is to be the first person to run a sub-four-minute mile, climb a 5.15 (9b/+) and a V15 (8C).

== Personal life ==
Kessler comes from a family of runners. His father, Michael, ran collegiately at Eastern Michigan University. His mother, Serena, also is a runner and made the 2012 US Olympic Trials in the marathon.
