= Ben Flanagan =

Canadian middle- and long-distance runner

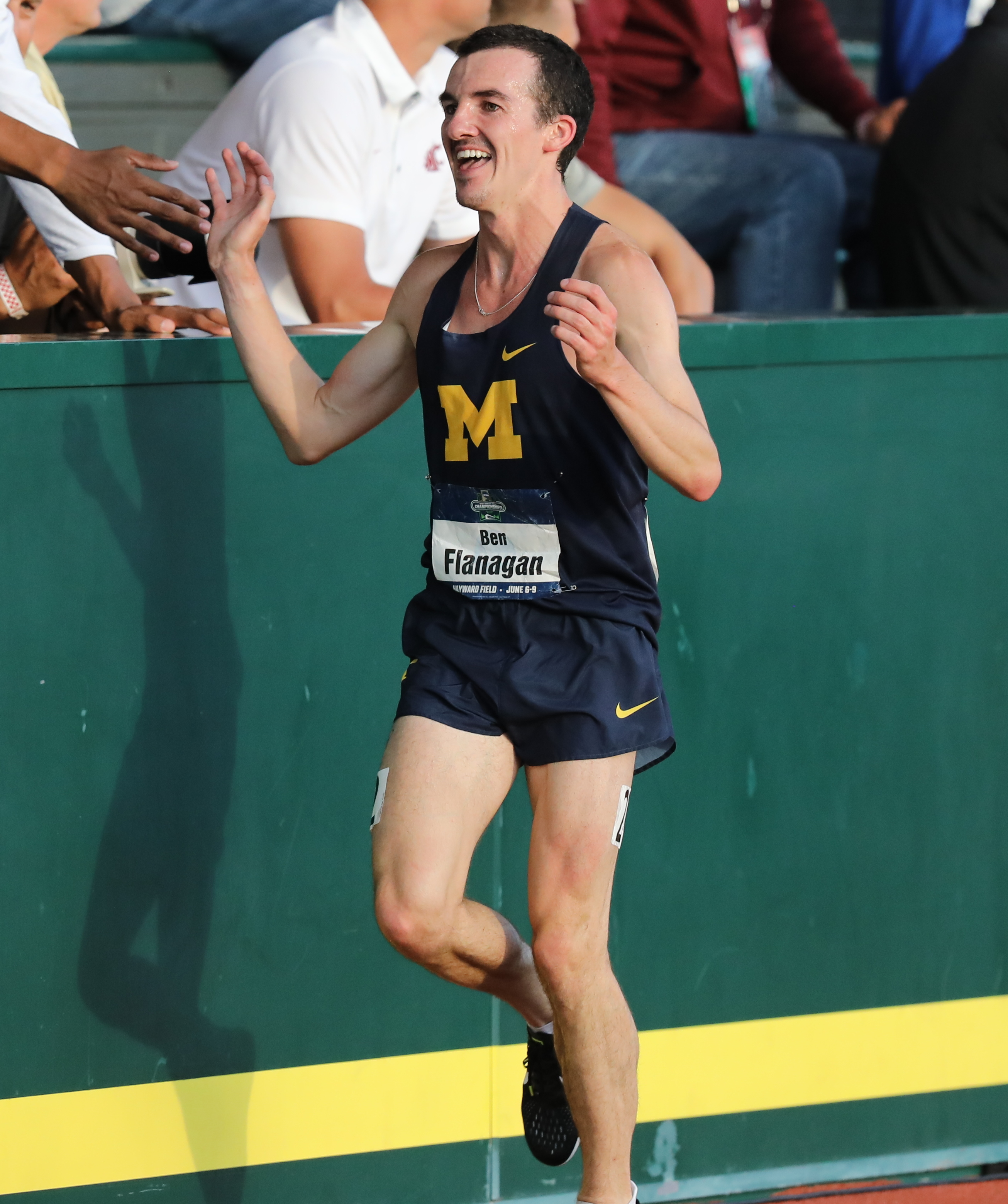
- Flanagan competing at the Hayward Field in Eugene in 2018

Personal information
- Full name: Benjamin Flanagan
- Born: January 11, 1995 (age 31) Kitchener, Ontario, Canada
- Employer(s): On (2022-present); Reebok (2018-2021)

Sport
- Country: Canada
- Sport: Track and field
- Event(s): 5000 m, 10,000 m
- College team: Michigan Wolverines
- Club: Very Nice Track Club (2022-present); Reebok Boston Track Club (2018-2021)
- Turned pro: 2018
- Coached by: Ron Warhurst (2022-present); Chris Fox (2018-2021); Kevin Sullivan (2013-2018)

Achievements and titles
- Personal bests: Outdoor; 1500 m: 3:39.63 (Windsor 2023); 3000 m: 7:52.84 (Victoria 2022); 5000 m: 13:13.97 (Walnut 2023); 10,000 m: 27:20.93 (San Juan Capistrano 2024); Indoor; 3000 m: 7:40.19i (Boston 2024); 5000 m: 13:04.62i (Boston 2024); Road; 5 km: 13:26 (Boston 2023) NR; 10 km: 28:11 (Boston 2022) NR; Half marathon: 1:01:00 (Valencia 2022)

Benjamin Flanagan (born January 11, 1995) is a Canadian long-distance runner. He is currently the Canadian record holder in the 5 km and 10 km road races. He is also a three-time winner of the Falmouth Road Race, having won the race in 2018, 2021, and 2022.

== High school career ==
Flanagan finished second in the U16 2000 m at the 2010 Canadian Youth Nationals. The next year he competed in the U18 3000 m, once again finishing in second. That same year he was selected to represent Canada at the 2011 World Youth Championships in Lille, France, where he placed 16th in the 1500 m.

He competed in the junior race at the 2013 World Cross Country Championships in Bydgoszcz, Poland, placing 34th and finishing as the top Canadian.

== College career ==
Flanagan attended the University of Michigan in Ann Arbor, Michigan. While there, he was coached by three-time Olympian and fellow Canadian Kevin Sullivan.

Flanagan was the Big Ten 10,000 m champion in 2016 and 2018, and the 2017 NCAA Great Lake Regional Cross Country champion. He won the 2018 NCAA Division I Outdoor Championships 10,000 m by running 28:34.53 and passing Vincent Kiprop of Alabama in the final metres of the race. Flanagan went viral on social media after he was recorded screaming "where's my mom?" in his post-race interview.

== Professional career ==
=== 2018 ===
Flanagan claimed his first major professional victory in the 2018 Falmouth Road Race, running the 7 mile course in a time of 32:21.

On September 4, 2018, he joined the Reebok Boston Track Club in Charlottesville, Virginia to be coached by Chris John Fox.

=== 2019 ===
Flanagan made his professional debut on January 26, 2019, at the Dr. Sander Columbia Challenge at the Armory in New York City. Contesting the 3000 m, he took first, running a personal best of 7:48.80. Two weeks later, he returned to the Armory once again to compete in the 3000 m at the 2019 Millrose Games. He placed 10th in a time of 7:54.40.

Flanagan opened his outdoor season competing at the BAA 5K, placing fourth in 13:49. Competing over 10,000 m, he set a personal best of 28:19.51 in Palo Alto on May 2, and won the Canadian title in the event the next month in Burnaby.

=== 2020 ===
Ben opened his 2020 campaign on January 25 at the New Balance Indoor Grand Prix running 7:56.02 over 3000 m. The next month competing at Boston University he ran personal bests over 3000 m (7:47.37 on Feb 15) and 5000 m (13:31.07 on February 28).

Despite competing sparsely due to the COVID-19 pandemic, Flanagan managed a 10,000 m personal best of 28:06.88 in August. In December, he made his half marathon debut, taking the win in Hardeeville, South Carolina in 1:03:19.

=== 2021 ===
In 2021, Flanagan failed to qualify for the postponed Tokyo Olympics. He achieved the necessary world ranking, but was beaten out for a spot on the Canadian team by Moh Ahmed, Justyn Knight, and Luc Bruchet.

Nevertheless, Flanagan ran a 10,000 m personal best of 27:49.07 on May 14 and a 5000 m personal best of 13:20.67 on May 27.

On the roads, he won his second Falmouth Road Race in August and won his first Manchester Road Race in November.

=== 2022 ===
On January 12, Flanagan announced on Instagram that he was leaving the Reebok Boston Track Club. The next week, he announced that he had signed a contract with On and was moving back to Ann Arbor to train with the Very Nice Track Club under coach Ron Warhurst.

Under Warhurst, Flanagan continued his success on the roads, setting a Canadian 10 km road record at the B.A.A. 10K in 28:11 and winning his third Falmouth Road Race in 32:25.

On October 23, Flanagan competed in the Valencia Half Marathon. While he only finished 18th overall, he beat fellow Canadian Cam Levins by 4 seconds, and broke Rory Linkletter's Canadian half marathon record holder with a time of 1:01:00.

=== 2023 ===
Flanagan opened his season on January 27 with a personal best of 13:11.97 over 5000m at the BU John Thomas Terrier Classic. The following week, he set a personal best of 7:43.49 in the 3000m at the New Balance Indoor Grand Prix.

At the B.A.A 5K in April, Flanagan broke Charles Philibert-Thiboutot's Canadian record in the 5 km road race, running 13:26 and finishing second behind training partner Morgan Beadlescomb.

At the 2023 Canadian Track and Field Championships, Flanagan won the 5000 m in a time of 13:39.36.

Later that summer, he qualified to represent Canada at his first World Athletics Championships in the 5000m, where he finished 11th in his heat with a time of 13:38.69.

In October, he represented Canada in the inaugural 5 km road race at the 2023 World Athletics Road Running Championships in Riga, Latvia, finishing 12th in a time of 13:34.

=== 2024 ===
On January 26, Flanagan entered the 5000 m at the John Thomas Terrier Classic in Boston with the goal of achieving the Olympic standard of 13:05.00. Coming through the 3000 m mark in 7:55.01, he reached 4800 m in 12:36.78, needing a last lap of 28.22 or faster to hit the standard. Trailing noted fast-finisher Geordie Beamish, he closed his lap in 27.85, the second fastest finishing lap of anyone in the field (besides Beamish). With that, he ran a time of 13:04.62, hitting the Olympic standard, making him eligible to be selected to represent Canada at the 2024 Olympics.

On February 4, Flanagan finished 4th in the 3000 m at the New Balance Indoor Grand Prix, running a personal best of 7:40.19.

After his brief indoor season, he embarked on a six-week altitude camp in Boulder, Colorado, training alongside members of the On Athletics Club in preparation for the Sound Running TEN on March 16, a 10,000 m race in San Juan Capistrano, California.

At the TEN, Flanagan ran a time of 27:20.93, eclipsing his previous personal best time by almost 30 seconds. The mark placed him third on the all-time Canadian list, only behind Moh Ahmed and Cam Levins.

== Competition record ==
=== International competitions ===
Representing Canada
Year	Competition	Venue	Position	Event	Time
2011	World Youth Championships	Lille, France	16th (h)	1500 m	3:55.95
2013	World Cross Country Championships	Bydgoszcz, Poland	34th	U20 race	23:21
2023	World Championships	Budapest, Hungary	23rd (h)	5000 m	13:38.69
2023	World Road Running Championships	Riga, Latvia	12th	5 km	13:38
2024	Olympic Games	Paris, France	17th (h)	5000 m	13:59.23

=== National championships ===
Year	Competition	Venue	Position	Event	Time
2011	Legion National Youth Track and Field Championships	Ottawa, Ontario	6th	1500 m	3:57.98
2011	Legion National Youth Track and Field Championships	Ottawa, Ontario	2nd	3000 m	8:30.48
2012	Canadian Cross Country Championships	Vancouver, British Columbia	2nd	8 km (U20)	24:38.40
2018	Canadian Track and Field Championships	Ottawa, Ontario	3rd	5000 m	14:36.66
2018	Canadian 5 km Road Championships	Toronto, Ontario	1st	5 km	13:57
2018	Canadian Cross Country Championships	Kingston, Ontario	9th	10 km	30:41.1
2019	Canadian 10,000 m Championships	Burnaby, British Columbia	1st	10,000 m	28:37.49
2021	Canadian 10 km Road Championships	Toronto, Ontario	1st	10 km	28:42
2022	Canadian 10 km Road Championships	Ottawa, Ontario	1st	10 km	28:40
2022	Canadian 5 km Road Championships	Moncton, New Brunswick	1st	5 km	13:38
2023	Canadian Track and Field Championships	Langley, British Columbia	1st	5000 m	13:38.69
2024	Canadian Track and Field Championships	Montreal, Quebec	3rd	5000 m	13:29.42

=== NCAA championships ===
Representing the Michigan Wolverines
Year	Competition	Venue	Position	Event	Time
2013	NCAA Cross Country Championships	Terre Haute, Indiana	99th	10 km	31:18.8
2014	NCAA Cross Country Championships	Terre Haute, Indiana	64th	10 km	31:12.6
2015	NCAA Cross Country Championships	Louisville, Kentucky	83rd	10 km	30:49.8
2016	NCAA Outdoor Track and Field Championships	Eugene, Oregon	14th	10,000 m	29:35.85
2017	NCAA Cross Country Championships	Louisville, Kentucky	20th	10 km	29:44.1
2018	NCAA Outdoor Track and Field Championships	Eugene, Oregon	1st	10,000 m	28:34.53

== Personal bests ==
Information from World Athletics profile.

Surface	Event	Time	Venue	Date	Notes
Indoor track	3000 meters	7:40.19	Boston, MA, United States	February 4, 2024	
Indoor track	5000 meters	13:04.62	Boston, MA, United States	January 26, 2024	
Outdoor track	1500 meters	3:39.63	Windsor, ON, Canada	June 24, 2023	
Outdoor track	One mile	3:57.75	Bay Shore, NY, United States	September 5, 2018	
Outdoor track	3000 meters	7:52.84	Victoria, BC, Canada	June 16, 2022	
Outdoor track	5000 meters	13:13.97	Walnut, CA, United States	May 6, 2023	
Outdoor track	10,000 meters	27:20.93	San Juan Capistrano, CA, United States	May 14, 2021	
Road	One mile	3:59.97	Honolulu, HI, United States	December 8, 2018	
Road	5 km	13:26	Boston, MA, United States	April 15, 2023	NR
Road	10 km	28:11	Boston, MA, United States	June 26, 2022	NR
Road	Half marathon	1:01:00	Valencia, Spain	October 23, 2022	NR from Oct. 2022 to Jan. 2023

== Personal life ==
Flanagan is the son of Ron and Michelle Flanagan. He has two sisters, Kristen and Jamie.

Flanagan met his fiancé when his host family for the Falmouth road race got a flat tire, causing him to stay the night with the president of the race, whose daughter also attended the University of Michigan. After dating for three years, the two got engaged.

== See also ==
- List of Canadian records in athletics
- Michigan Wolverines men's track and field
