= 2013 IAAF World Cross Country Championships – Senior men's race =

Senior men's race at the 2013 IAAF World Cross Country Championships
- Organisers: IAAF
- Edition: 40th
- Date: March 24
- Host city: Bydgoszcz, Województwo kujawsko-pomorskie, Poland
- Venue: Myślęcinek Park
- Events: 1
- Distances: 12 km – Senior men
- Participation: 102 athletes from 30 nations

The Senior men's race at the 2013 IAAF World Cross Country Championships was held at the Myślęcinek Park in Bydgoszcz, Poland, on March 24, 2013. Reports of the event were given in the Herald and for the IAAF.

Complete results for individuals, and for teams were published.

== Race results ==
=== Senior men's race (12 km) ===
==== Individual ====
Rank	Athlete	Country	Time
1st place, gold medalist(s)	Japhet Kipyegon Korir	Kenya	32:45
2nd place, silver medalist(s)	Imane Merga	Ethiopia	32:51
3rd place, bronze medalist(s)	Teklemariam Medhin	Eritrea	32:54
4	Moses Ndiema Kipsiro	Uganda	33:08
5	Timothy Toroitich	Uganda	33:09
6	Ben True	United States	33:11
7	Goitom Kifle	Eritrea	33:16
8	Collis Birmingham	Australia	33:18
9	Feyisa Lilesa	Ethiopia	33:22
10	Chris Derrick	United States	33:23
11	Rabah Aboud	Algeria	33:28
12	Hosea Mwok Macharinyang	Kenya	33:29
13	Abera Chane	Ethiopia	33:31
14	Tesfaye Abera	Ethiopia	33:35
15	Geoffrey Kipkorir Kirui	Kenya	33:38
16	Sergio Sánchez	Spain	33:38
17	Ryan Vail	United States	33:42
18	Abrar Osman	Eritrea	33:42
19	Robert Mack	United States	33:49
20	Elroy Gelant	South Africa	33:53
21	Hicham Bouchicha	Algeria	33:54
22	Mohammed Ahmed	Canada	33:56
23	Liam Adams	Australia	34:07
24	Mosinet Geremew	Ethiopia	34:09
25	Geofrey Kusuro	Uganda	34:09
26	Timothy Kosgei Kiptoo	Kenya	34:10
27	Carles Castillejo	Spain	34:11
28	Błażej Brzeziński	Poland	34:11
29	Brett Robinson	Australia	34:11
30	Elliott Heath	United States	34:11
31	Jonathan Taylor	United Kingdom	34:14
32	Antonio David Jiménez	Spain	34:14
33	Chris Winter	Canada	34:15
34	Abdennacer Fathi	Morocco	34:16
35	Mounir Miout	Algeria	34:16
36	Philemon Rono	Kenya	34:19
37	James Strang	United States	34:20
38	Arkadiusz Gardzielewski	Poland	34:21
39	Steven Vernon	United Kingdom	34:22
40	Abdelmadjed Touil	Algeria	34:25
41	Cameron Levins	Canada	34:27
42	Phillip Kiplimo	Uganda	34:37
43	Tomasz Szymkowiak	Poland	34:38
44	Mathew Walters	Canada	34:39
45	Frank Tickner	United Kingdom	34:40
46	Fred Arapsudi	Uganda	34:40
47	Samsom Gebreyohannes	Eritrea	34:43
48	Manuel Damião	Portugal	34:43
49	Ahmed Dali	Algeria	34:47
50	Nelson Mbuya	Tanzania	34:48
51	Michael Skinner	United Kingdom	34:49
52	José España	Spain	34:50
53	Milan Kocourek	Czech Republic	34:50
54	Kelly Wiebe	Canada	34:51
55	Krystian Zalewski	Poland	34:51
56	Stephen Kelly	Australia	34:52
57	António Silva	Portugal	34:53
58	Dotto Ikangaa	Tanzania	35:01
59	Gladwin Mzazi	South Africa	35:03
60	Krzysztof Żebrowski	Poland	35:05
61	Nguse Tesfaldet	Eritrea	35:06
62	Yolo Nikolov	Bulgaria	35:08
63	Mitchel Brown	Australia	35:10
64	Łukasz Kujawski	Poland	35:11
65	Lucas Bruchet	Canada	35:12
66	Jean Baptiste Simukeka	Rwanda	35:14
67	Sérgio da Silva	Brazil	35:15
68	Philip Nicholls	United Kingdom	35:15
69	Yigrem Demelash	Ethiopia	35:16
70	Takumi Honda	Japan	35:22
71	Lyes Belkhir	Algeria	35:37
72	Wissem Hosni	Tunisia	35:37
73	Robert Kajuga	Rwanda	35:41
74	Éderson Pereira	Brazil	35:45
75	Eric Sebahire	Rwanda	35:53
76	Miguel Angel Hernandez	Mexico	36:02
77	Keigo Yano	Japan	36:05
78	Tiago Costa	Portugal	36:12
79	Wataru Ueno	Japan	36:18
80	Hiroyuki Ono	Japan	36:22
81	Jesús Antonio Nuñez	Spain	36:24
82	Edward Mwanza	Zambia	36:35
83	Abdelmunaim Yahya Adam	Sudan	36:38
84	Cyriaque Ndayikengurukiye	Rwanda	36:49
85	Edris Yousif	Sudan	36:54
86	Felix Ntirenganya	Rwanda	37:18
87	Desmond Mokgobu	South Africa	37:26
88	Nader Almassri	Palestine	37:36
89	Hassan Ismail	Sudan	37:40
90	David Manja	South Africa	37:41
91	Mynhardt Mbeumuna Kawanivi	Namibia	38:14
92	Adilet Kyshtabekov	Kyrgyzstan	38:37
93	Ahmed Hawli	Sudan	38:52
94	Duan Qiquan	China	38:53
95	Dong Guojian	China	39:38
96	Mubarak Al-Marashda	United Arab Emirates	40:02
—	Dickson Marwa	Tanzania	DNF
—	Jonathan Muia Ndiku	Kenya	DNF
—	Daniel da Silva	Brazil	DNF
—	Alemu Bekele	Bahrain	DNF
—	Valério Fabiano	Brazil	DNF
—	Gilmar Lopes	Brazil	DNF

==== Teams ====
Rank	Team	Points
1st place, gold medalist(s)	Ethiopia: Imane Merga / 2; Feyisa Lilesa / 9; Abera Chane / 13; Tesfaye Abera / 14; (Mosinet Geremew) / (24); (Yigrem Demelash) / (69)	38
2nd place, silver medalist(s)	United States: Ben True / 6; Chris Derrick / 10; Ryan Vail / 17; Robert Mack / 19; (Elliott Heath) / (30); (James Strang) / (37)	52
3rd place, bronze medalist(s)	Kenya: Japhet Kipyegon Korir / 1; Hosea Mwok Macharinyang / 12; Geoffrey Kipkorir Kirui / 15; Timothy Kosgei Kiptoo / 26; (Philemon Rono Cherop) / (36); (Jonathan Muia Ndiku) / (DNF)	54
4	Eritrea: Teklemariam Medhin / 3; Goitom Kifle / 7; Abrar Osman / 18; Samsom Gebreyohannes / 47; (Nguse Tesfaldet) / (61)	75
5	Uganda: Moses Ndiema Kipsiro / 4; Timothy Toroitich / 5; Geofrey Kusuro / 25; Phillip Kiplimo / 42; (Fred Arapsudi) / (46)	76
6	Algeria: Rabah Aboud / 11; Hicham Bouchicha / 21; Mounir Miout / 35; Abdelmadjed Touil / 40; (Ahmed Dali) / (49); (Lyes Belkhir) / (71)	107
7	Australia: Collis Birmingham / 8; Liam Adams / 23; Brett Robinson / 29; Stephen Kelly / 56; (Mitchel Brown) / (63)	116
8	Spain: Sergio Sánchez / 16; Carles Castillejo / 27; Antonio David Jiménez / 32; José España / 52; (Jesús Antonio Nuñez) / (81)	127
9	Canada: Mohammed Ahmed / 22; Chris Winter / 33; Cameron Levins / 41; Mathew Walters / 44; (Kelly Wiebe) / (54); (Lucas Bruchet) / (65)	140
10	Poland: Błażej Brzeziński / 28; Arkadiusz Gardzielewski / 38; Tomasz Szymkowiak / 43; Krystian Zalewski / 55; (Krzysztof Żebrowski) / (60); (Łukasz Kujawski) / (64)	164
11	United Kingdom: Jonathan Taylor / 31; Steven Vernon / 39; Frank Tickner / 45; Michael Skinner / 51; (Philip Nicholls) / (68)	166
12	South Africa: Elroy Gelant / 20; Gladwin Mzazi / 59; Desmond Mokgobu / 87; David Manja / 90	256
13	Rwanda: Jean Baptiste Simukeka / 66; Robert Kajuga / 73; Eric Sebahire / 75; Cyriaque Ndayikengurukiye / 84; (Felix Ntirenganya) / (86)	298
14	Japan: Takumi Honda / 70; Keigo Yano / 77; Wataru Ueno / 79; Hiroyuki Ono / 80	306
15	Sudan: Abdelmunaim Yahya Adam / 83; Edris Yousif / 85; Hassan Ismail / 89; Ahmed Hawli / 93	350

- Note: Athletes in parentheses did not score for the team result.

== Participation ==
According to an unofficial count, 102 athletes from 30 countries participated in the Senior men's race.

- Algeria (6)
- Australia (5)
- Bahrain (1)
- Brazil (5)
- Bulgaria (1)
- Canada (6)
- China (2)
- Czech Republic (1)
- Eritrea (5)
- Ethiopia (6)
- Japan (4)
- Kenya (6)
- Kyrgyzstan (1)
- Mexico (1)
- Morocco (1)
- Namibia (1)
- Palestine (1)
- Poland (6)
- Portugal (3)
- Rwanda (5)
- South Africa (4)
- Spain (5)
- Sudan (4)
- Tanzania (3)
- Tunisia (1)
- Uganda (5)
- United Arab Emirates (1)
- United Kingdom (5)
- United States (6)
- Zambia (1)

== See also ==
- 2013 IAAF World Cross Country Championships – Junior men's race
- 2013 IAAF World Cross Country Championships – Senior women's race
- 2013 IAAF World Cross Country Championships – Junior women's race
