= 2013 IAAF World Cross Country Championships – Junior men's race =

Junior men's race at the 2013 IAAF World Cross Country Championships
- Organisers: IAAF
- Edition: 40th
- Date: March 24
- Host city: Bydgoszcz, Województwo kujawsko-pomorskie, Poland
- Venue: Myślęcinek Park
- Events: 1
- Distances: 8 km – Junior men
- Participation: 113 athletes from 27 nations

The Junior men's race at the 2013 IAAF World Cross Country Championships was held at the Myślęcinek Park in Bydgoszcz, Poland, on March 24, 2013. Reports of the event were given in the Herald and for the IAAF.

Complete results for individuals, and for teams were published.

== Race results ==
=== Junior men's race (8 km) ===
==== Individual ====
| Rank | Athlete | Country | Time |
|---|---|---|---|
| 1st place, gold medalist(s) | Hagos Gebrhiwet | Ethiopia | 21:04 |
| 2nd place, silver medalist(s) | Leonard Barsoton | Kenya | 21:08 |
| 3rd place, bronze medalist(s) | Muktar Edris | Ethiopia | 21:13 |
| 4 | Tsegay Tuemay | Eritrea | 21:26 |
| 5 | Conseslus Kipruto | Kenya | 21:40 |
| 6 | Birhan Nebebew | Ethiopia | 21:42 |
| 7 | Ghirmay Ghebreslassie | Eritrea | 21:50 |
| 8 | Dawit Weldesilasie | Eritrea | 21:58 |
| 9 | Ronald Kwemoi | Kenya | 21:58 |
| 10 | Michael Bett | Kenya | 22:21 |
| 11 | Moses Letoyie | Kenya | 22:28 |
| 12 | Mohammed Abid | Morocco | 22:31 |
| 13 | Yihunilign Adane | Ethiopia | 22:33 |
| 14 | Zouhair Talbi | Morocco | 22:34 |
| 15 | Alex Kapcheromit Cherop | Uganda | 22:35 |
| 16 | Abdallah Kibet Mande | Uganda | 22:36 |
| 17 | Bonsa Dida | Ethiopia | 22:38 |
| 18 | Omar Ait Chitachen | Morocco | 22:38 |
| 19 | Tumisang Monnatlala | South Africa | 22:52 |
| 20 | Matt McClintock | United States | 22:52 |
| 21 | Hassan Ghachoui | Morocco | 22:53 |
| 22 | Emmanuel Bett Kiprono | Kenya | 22:53 |
| 23 | Jaouad Chemlal | Morocco | 23:03 |
| 24 | Craig Nowak | United States | 23:03 |
| 25 | Tsegay Hiluf | Ethiopia | 23:04 |
| 26 | Malachy Schrobilgen | United States | 23:12 |
| 27 | Yuki Hirota | Japan | 23:13 |
| 28 | Tatsuya Hayashi | Japan | 23:14 |
| 29 | Alexandre Saddedine | France | 23:14 |
| 30 | Isaac Kimeli | Belgium | 23:15 |
| 31 | Tadashi Isshiki | Japan | 23:17 |
| 32 | Lorenzo Dini | Italy | 23:18 |
| 33 | Morgan McDonald | Australia | 23:21 |
| 34 | Benjamin Flanagan | Canada | 23:21 |
| 35 | Jonathan Davies | United Kingdom | 23:22 |
| 36 | Darren Fahy | United States | 23:25 |
| 37 | Michael Callegari | United Kingdom | 23:25 |
| 38 | Yemaneberhan Crippa | Italy | 23:26 |
| 39 | Moses Martin Kurong | Uganda | 23:27 |
| 40 | Thomas Graham | United States | 23:27 |
| 41 | Jacob Birtwhistle | Australia | 23:28 |
| 42 | Andrew Gardner | United States | 23:30 |
| 43 | Ryan Sleiman | Canada | 23:32 |
| 44 | Yohannes Chiappinelli | Italy | 23:33 |
| 45 | Hamza Youcefi | Algeria | 23:34 |
| 46 | Thiago Andrè | Brazil | 23:35 |
| 47 | Ricardo Garcia | Mexico | 23:37 |
| 48 | Jack Curran | Australia | 23:38 |
| 49 | Jack Davies | Australia | 23:38 |
| 50 | Samuele Dini | Italy | 23:38 |
| 51 | Michael Ward | United Kingdom | 23:39 |
| 52 | Hideto Yamanaka | Japan | 23:40 |
| 53 | Troy Smith | Canada | 23:40 |
| 54 | Daniel Delattre | France | 23:43 |
| 55 | Italo Quazzola | Italy | 23:45 |
| 56 | Mehdi Belhadj | France | 23:45 |
| 57 | Christian Gravel | Canada | 23:47 |
| 58 | Gordon Benson | United Kingdom | 23:50 |
| 59 | Yusuke Nishiyama | Japan | 23:50 |
| 60 | Maciej Bielawiec | Poland | 23:50 |
| 61 | Victor Montañez | Mexico | 23:54 |
| 62 | Emmanuel Roudolff-Lévisse | France | 23:54 |
| 63 | Ahmed Slimane | Algeria | 23:55 |
| 64 | Raúl Celada | Spain | 23:56 |
| 65 | Sean Guiney | Australia | 23:57 |
| 66 | Hamza Habjaoui | France | 23:59 |
| 67 | Miguel Marques | Portugal | 23:59 |
| 68 | Abdessalem Ayouni | Tunisia | 23:59 |
| 69 | Theodore Klein | France | 23:59 |
| 70 | Fahmi Dhiab | Tunisia | 23:59 |
| 71 | Nekagenet Crippa | Italy | 24:02 |
| 72 | William Paulson | United Kingdom | 24:03 |
| 73 | Rafal Matuszczak | Poland | 24:05 |
| 74 | Brandon Allen | Canada | 24:05 |
| 75 | Mohamed Jelloul | Spain | 24:07 |
| 76 | Aleksander Kusmierz | Poland | 24:08 |
| 77 | Lewis Lloyd | United Kingdom | 24:17 |
| 78 | Mike Tate | Canada | 24:21 |
| 79 | Brahim Mahammedi | Algeria | 24:28 |
| 80 | Jonathan Romeo | Spain | 24:28 |
| 81 | Kazuki Takahashi | Japan | 24:28 |
| 82 | Nadhir Gouasmia | Algeria | 24:32 |
| 83 | José Rodrigo da Silva | Brazil | 24:32 |
| 84 | Rantso Mokopane | South Africa | 24:35 |
| 85 | Szymon Topolnicki | Poland | 24:38 |
| 86 | Stewart McSweyn | Australia | 24:38 |
| 87 | Andrei Burdukevich | Belarus | 24:41 |
| 88 | Pawel Pankratow | Poland | 24:42 |
| 89 | Edgar Alan García | Mexico | 24:42 |
| 90 | Aleksandar Yotovski | Bulgaria | 24:47 |
| 91 | Seif Eddine Djarmouni | Algeria | 24:52 |
| 92 | Romdhane Badri | Tunisia | 24:52 |
| 93 | Fayçal Doucen | Algeria | 24:54 |
| 94 | Adélio dos Santos | Brazil | 24:56 |
| 95 | Iheb Gtari | Tunisia | 24:57 |
| 96 | Bilel Marouani | Tunisia | 25:11 |
| 97 | Emad Mahdi Abdullah | Yemen | 25:13 |
| 98 | Nattawut Innum | Thailand | 25:14 |
| 99 | Marc Alcalá | Spain | 25:18 |
| 100 | Michael Cherop | Uganda | 25:20 |
| 101 | Thabang Nkuna | South Africa | 25:22 |
| 102 | Sornram Bangbunnak | Thailand | 25:27 |
| 103 | Najmeddine Hannachi | Tunisia | 25:41 |
| 104 | Andrés Arroyo | Puerto Rico | 25:50 |
| 105 | Mijuenima | China | 25:51 |
| 106 | Danmuzhenciwang | China | 25:52 |
| 107 | Nattawat Innum | Thailand | 25:52 |
| 108 | Victor Santana | Puerto Rico | 26:24 |
| 109 | Creel Chavalala | South Africa | 27:23 |
| 110 | Victor Vinicius da Silva | Brazil | 29:23 |
| — | Marouane Kahlaoui | Morocco | DNF |
| — | Damian Rudnik | Poland | DNF |
| — | Thanapon Rattanapholsan | Thailand | DNF |

==== Teams ====
| Rank | Team | Points |
|---|---|---|
| 1st place, gold medalist(s) | Ethiopia: Hagos Gebrhiwet / 1; Muktar Edris / 3; Birhan Nebebew / 6; Yihunilign Adane / 13; (Bonsa Dida) / (17); (Tsegay Hiluf) / (25) | 23 |
| 2nd place, silver medalist(s) | Kenya: Leonard Barsoton / 2; Conseslus Kipruto / 5; Ronald Kwemoi / 9; Michael Bett / 10; (Moses Letoyie) / (11); (Emmanuel Bett Kiprono) / (22) | 26 |
| 3rd place, bronze medalist(s) | Morocco: Mohammed Abid / 12; Zouhair Talbi / 14; Omar Ait Chitachen / 18; Hassan Ghachoui / 21; (Jaouad Chemlal) / (23); (Marouane Kahlaoui) / (DNF) | 65 |
| 4 | United States: Matt McClintock / 20; Nowak Craig / 24; Malachy Schrobilgen / 26; Darren Fahy / 36; (Thomas Graham) / (40); (Andrew Gardner) / (42) | 106 |
| 5 | Japan: Yuki Hirota / 27; Tatsuya Hayashi / 28; Tadashi Isshiki / 31; Hideto Yamanaka / 52; (Yusuke Nishiyama) / (59); (Kazuki Takahashi) / (81) | 138 |
| 6 | Italy: Lorenzo Dini / 32; Yemaneberhan Crippa / 38; Yohannes Chiappinelli / 44; Samuele Dini / 50; (Italo Quazzola) / (55); (Nekagenet Crippa) / (71) | 164 |
| 7 | Uganda: Alex Kapcheromit Cherop / 15; Abdallah Kibet Mande / 16; Moses Martin Kurong / 39; Michael Cherop / 100 | 170 |
| 8 | Australia: Morgan McDonald / 33; Jacob Birtwhistle / 41; Jack Curran / 48; Jack Davies / 49; (Sean Guiney) / (65); (Stewart McSweyn) / (86) | 171 |
| 9 | United Kingdom: Jonathan Davies / 35; Michael Callegari / 37; Michael Ward / 51; Gordon Benson / 58; (William Paulson) / (72); (Lewis Lloyd) / (77) | 181 |
| 10 | Canada: Benjamin Flanagan / 34; Ryan Sleiman / 43; Troy Smith / 53; Christian Gravel / 57; (Brandon Allen) / (74); (Mike Tate) / (78) | 187 |
| 11 | France: Alexandre Saddedine / 29; Daniel Delattre / 54; Mehdi Belhadj / 56; Emmanuel Roudolff-Lévisse / 62; (Hamza Habjaoui) / (66); (Theodore Klein) / (69) | 201 |
| 12 | Algeria: Hamza Youcefi / 45; Ahmed Slimane / 63; Brahim Mahammedi / 79; Nadhir Gouasmia / 82; (Seif Eddine Djarmouni) / (91); (Fayçal Doucen) / (93) | 269 |
| 13 | Poland: Maciej Bielawiec / 60; Rafal Matuszczak / 73; Aleksander Kusmierz / 76; Szymon Topolnicki / 85; (Pawel Pankratow) / (88); (Damian Rudnik) / (DNF) | 294 |
| 14 | South Africa: Tumisang Monnatlala / 19; Rantso Mokopane / 84; Thabang Nkuna / 101; Creel Chavalala / 109 | 313 |
| 15 | Spain: Raúl Celada / 64; Mohamed Jelloul / 75; Jonathan Romeo / 80; Marc Alcalá / 99 | 318 |
| 16 | Tunisia: Abdessalem Ayouni / 68; Fahmi Dhiab / 70; Romdhane Badri / 92; Iheb Gtari / 95; (Bilel Marouani) / (96); (Najmeddine Hannachi) / (103) | 325 |
| 17 | Brazil: Thiago Andrè / 46; José Rodrigo da Silva / 83; Adélio dos Santos / 94; Victor Vinicius da Silva / 110 | 333 |

- Note: Athletes in parentheses did not score for the team result.

== Participation ==
According to an unofficial count, 113 athletes from 27 countries participated in the Junior men's race.

- Algeria (6)
- Australia (6)
- Belarus (1)
- Belgium (1)
- Brazil (4)
- Bulgaria (1)
- Canada (6)
- China (2)
- Eritrea (3)
- Ethiopia (6)
- France (6)
- Italy (6)
- Japan (6)
- Kenya (6)
- Mexico (3)
- Morocco (6)
- Poland (6)
- Portugal (1)
- Puerto Rico (2)
- South Africa (4)
- Spain (4)
- Thailand (4)
- Tunisia (6)
- Uganda (4)
- United Kingdom (6)
- United States (6)
- Yemen (1)

== See also ==
- 2013 IAAF World Cross Country Championships – Senior men's race
- 2013 IAAF World Cross Country Championships – Senior women's race
- 2013 IAAF World Cross Country Championships – Junior women's race
