= Very Nice Track Club =

- Short name: VNTC
- Sport: Track and field
- Location: Ann Arbor, Michigan
- Head coach: Ron Warhurst

The Very Nice Track Club is a training group composed of middle- and long-distance runners based in Ann Arbor, Michigan. The group is coached by former University of Michigan track and field coach Ron Warhurst.

The name of the club traces takes its origin in Warhurst's habit of yelling "very nice" at his athletes, words that he had tattooed on his butt at the 1992 Olympic Trials. The group is very loosely based with no collective sponsor for all athletes and with many athletes training in different regions at different times, however they all retain affiliation with Warhurst as a coach.

As of 2024, the VNTC is working towards becoming a nonprofit organization, with the goal of being able to host events for runners around Ann Arbor, Michigan.

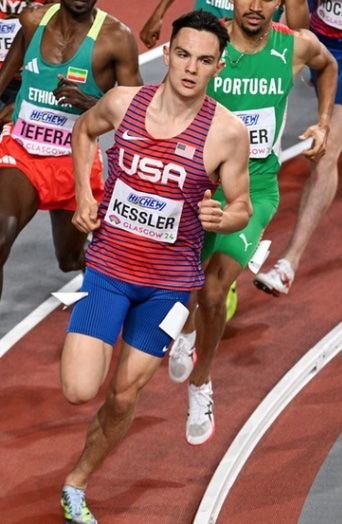
Hobbs Kessler

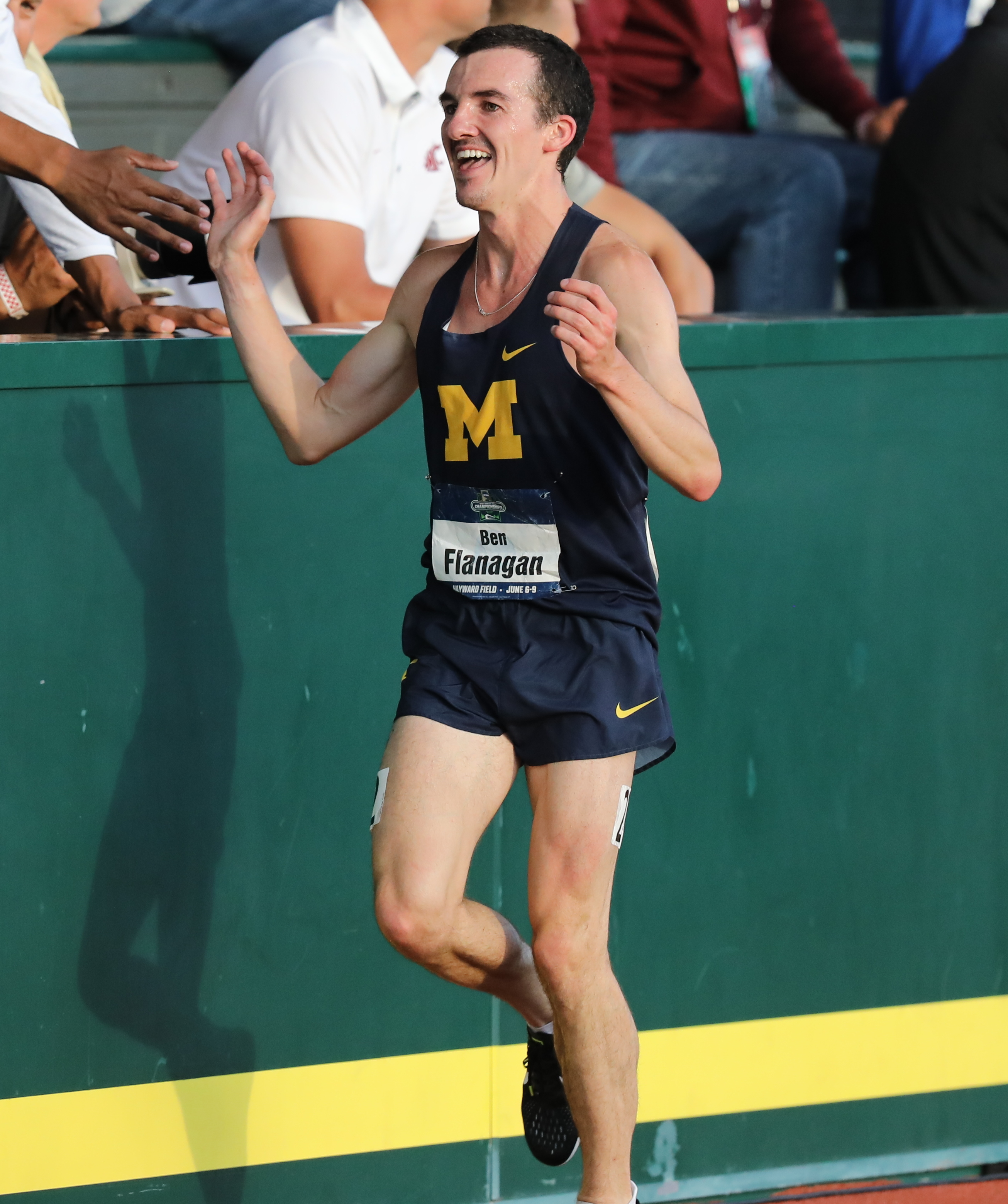
Ben Flanagan

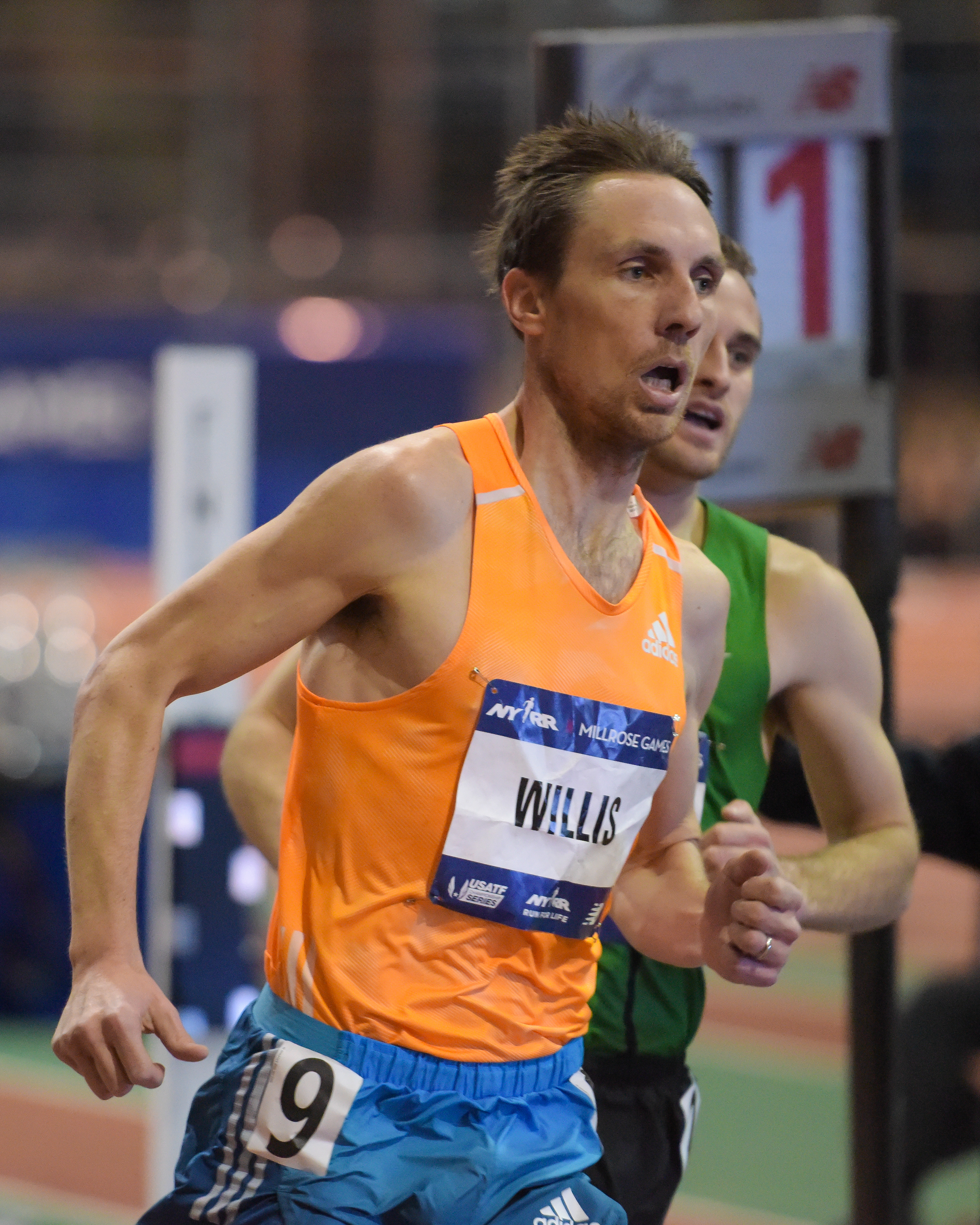
Nick Willis

Very Nice Track Club Athletes

== VNTC Athletes ==
- Ben Flanagan (Canada)
- Morgan Beadlescomb (United States)
- Mason Ferlic (United States)
- Hobbs Kessler (United States)
- Bryce Hoppel (United States)
- Nathan Mylenek (United States)
- Eric Avila (United States)
- Charlie Grice (United Kingdom)
- Nick Willis (New Zealand)
- Dani Jones (United States)
