= Abdallah Kibet Mande =

Ugandan long-distance runner

Personal information
- Born: 10 May 1995 (age 30)

Sport
- Country: Uganda
- Sport: Long-distance running

Abdallah Kibet Mande (born 10 May 1995) is an Ugandan long-distance runner. In 2019, he competed in the men's 10,000 metres at the 2019 World Athletics Championships held in Doha, Qatar. He finished in 17th place.

In 2013, he competed in the junior men's race at the 2013 IAAF World Cross Country Championships held in Bydgoszcz, Poland. He finished in 16th place.

In 2017, he competed in the senior men's race at the 2017 IAAF World Cross Country Championships held in Kampala, Uganda. He finished in 16th place.
