= 2014 World Junior Championships in Athletics – Men's 3000 metres steeplechase =

The men's 3000 metres steeplechase at the 2014 World Junior Championships in Athletics was held at Hayward Field from 25 to 27 July.

== Medalists ==
Gold	Barnabas Kipyego; Kenya
Silver	Titus Kipruto Kibiego; Kenya
Bronze	Evans Rutto Chematot; Bahrain

== Records ==
Standing records prior to the 2014 World Junior Championships in Athletics
World Junior Record	Saif Saaeed Shaheen (QAT)	7:58.66	Brussels, Belgium	24 August 2001
Championship Record	Conseslus Kipruto (KEN)	8:06.10	Barcelona, Spain	15 July 2012
World Junior Leading	John Kibet Koech (BHR)	8:19.99	Bydgoszcz, Poland	2 June 2014
Broken records during the 2014 World Junior Championships in Athletics

== Results ==
=== Heats ===
==== Heat 1 ====
1	Barnabas Kipyego (KEN)	8:31.72	Q	
2	Meresa Kahsay (ETH)	8:38.01	Q	
3	Evans Rutto Chematot (BHR)	8:40.37	Q	PB
4	Yohanes Chiappinelli (ITA)	8:46.82	Q	PB
5	Ali Messaoudi (ALG)	8:46.95	Q	
6	Patrick Karl (GER)	8:47.20	q	PB
7	Bailey Roth (USA)	8:48.60	q	PB
8	Alberts Blajs (LAT)	8:52.47	q	PB
9	Ben Preisner (CAN)	8:53.14	q	PB
10	Kazuya Shiojiri (JPN)	8:54.95	q	
11	Filip Sasinek (CZE)	8:55.53		PB
12	Guillaume Lonjou (FRA)	8:58.72		PB
13	Mestan Turhan (TUR)	9:18.71		
14	Daniel Reyes (MEX)	9:19.81		

==== Heat 2 ====
1	Titus Kipruto Kibiego (KEN)	8:49.95	Q	
2	Soufiane Elbakkali (MAR)	8:50.19	Q	
3	Hailemariyam Amare (ETH)	8:54.92	Q	PB
4	Tumisang Monnatlala (RSA)	8:56.51	Q	
5	Mehdi Belhadj (FRA)	8:58.87	Q	
6	Brandon Allen (CAN)	8:59.84		
7	Bryce Miller (USA)	9:06.17		
8	Ersin Tekal (TUR)	9:11.46		
9	Umberto Contran (ITA)	9:13.92		
10	Jan Fris (CZE)	9:20.52		
11	Andre Pereira (POR)	9:22.56		
12	Serhii Shevchenko (UKR)	9:22.91		
13	Faycal Doucen (ALG)	9:28.96		
14	Llorenc Esteve (ESP)	9:33.71		

=== Final ===
1	Barnabas Kipyego (KEN)	8:25.57	
2	Titus Kipruto Kibiego (KEN)	8:26.15	
3	Evans Rutto Chematot (BHR)	8:32.61	PB
4	Soufiane Elbakkali (MAR)	8:34.98	
5	Hailemariyam Amare (ETH)	8:42.00	PB
6	Yohanes Chiappinelli (ITA)	8:43.18	PB
7	Meresa Kahsay (ETH)	8:44.15	
8	Ali Messaoudi (ALG)	8:45.20	
9	Kazuya Shiojiri (JPN)	8:45.66	PB
10	Bailey Roth (USA)	8:47.04	PB
11	Ben Preisner (CAN)	8:56.22	
12	Patrick Karl (GER)	9:03.16	
13	Tumisang Monnatlala (RSA)	9:04.26	
14	Mehdi Belhadj (FRA)	9:13.82	
15	Alberts Blajs (LAT)	9:14.95	
