= Yusuke Nishiyama (runner) =

Japanese long-distance runner

Personal information
- Born: 7 November 1994 (age 30)

Sport
- Country: Japan
- Sport: Long-distance running

Yusuke Nishiyama (西山 雄介, Nishiyama Yūsuke; born 7 November 1994) is a Japanese long-distance runner.

In 2013, he competed in the junior men's race at the 2013 IAAF World Cross Country Championships held in Bydgoszcz, Poland. He finished in 59th place.

In 2019, he competed in the senior men's race at the 2019 IAAF World Cross Country Championships held in Aarhus, Denmark. He finished in 99th place.
