= Barnabas Kipyego =

Kenyan steeplechase runner

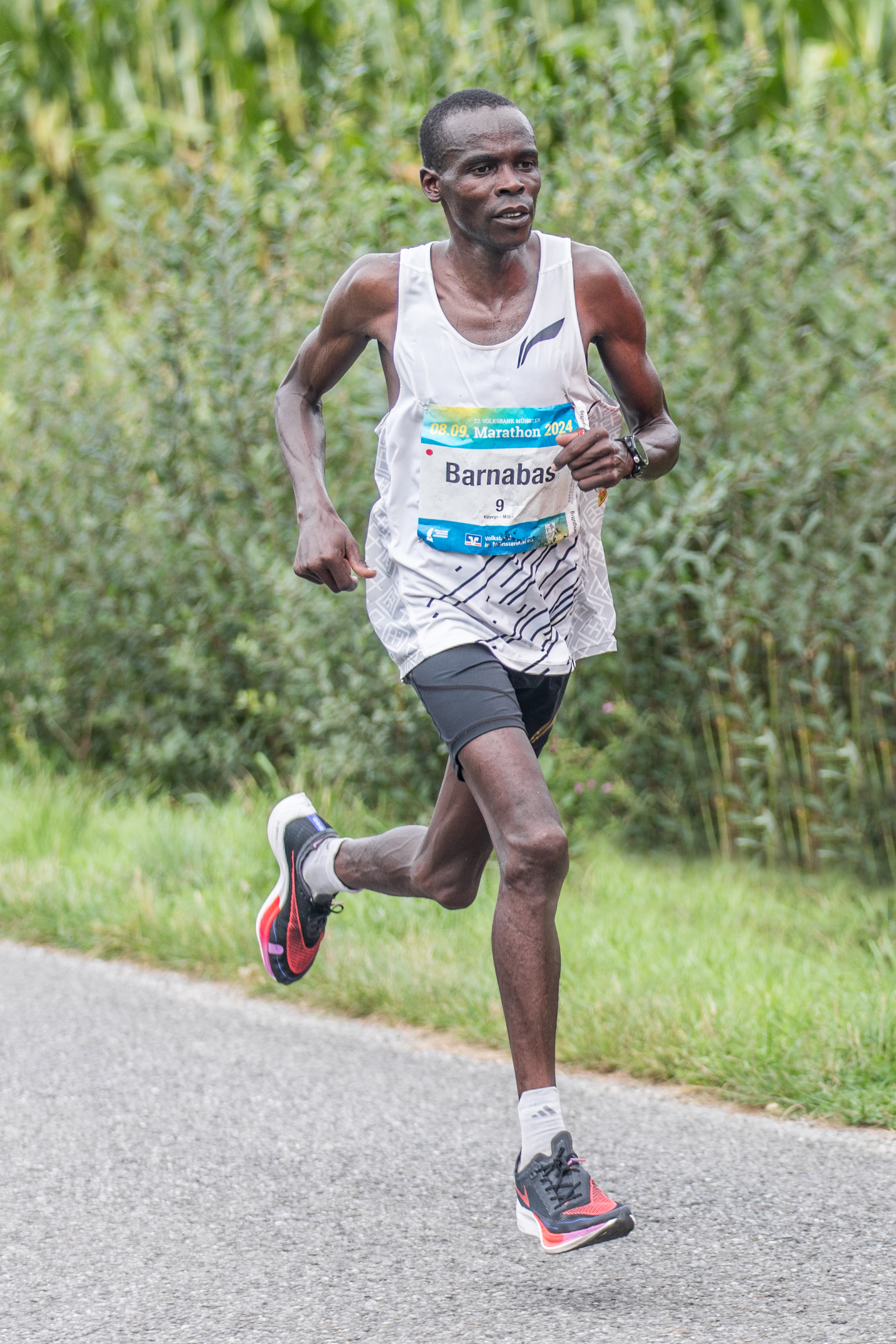
- Kipyego at the 2024 Münster Marathon

Personal information
- Nationality: Kenyan
- Born: June 12, 1995 (age 31)
- Height: 176 cm (5 ft 9 1/2 in)
- Weight: 57 kg (126 lb)

Sport
- Sport: Athletics
- Event: 3000 metres steeplechase

Achievements and titles
- Personal best: 3000m SC: 8:09.13 (2016)
Medal record
Men's athletics
Representing Kenya
World U20 Championships
Gold medal – first place	2014 Eugene	3000 m steeplechase

Barnabas Kipyego (born 12 June 1995) is a Kenyan 3000 metre steeplechase runner. He was the 2014 World U20 Champion in that event.

== Biography ==
Kipyego's first major international competition was the 2014 IAAF World Junior Championships in Eugene, Oregon, where he won the world junior steeplechase title in a time of 8:25.57. His countryman Titus Kibiego led early in the race, but with one lap to go Kipyego took the lead and he had the best final two barriers to win with a final-lap time of 61.21 seconds.

The next month, Kipyego made his Diamond League debut at the Birmingham Diamond League, finishing 3rd in a world U20 leading time of 8:17.03.

Kipyego was a regular participant in Diamond League steeplechase races over the next several years. He was ranked 10th in the LetsRun.com 2016 year-end rankings, where it was noted that in any other country Kipyego would be a top-tier prospect, but he was overshadowed due to the Kenyan dominance in the steeplechase at the time. Due to this steep national level competition, Kipyego never made a World or Olympic team for his country.

On 8 September 2024, Kipyego finished the Münster Marathon in a time of 02:14:48 h.

== Statistics ==
=== Personal bests ===
Event	Mark	Competition	Venue	Date
3000 metres steeplechase	8:09.13	Monaco Diamond League	Monaco	15 July 2016
15 kilometres	46:11.1	2023 Kerzerslauf	Switzerland	18 March 2023
