= Ben True =

American distance runner (born 1985)

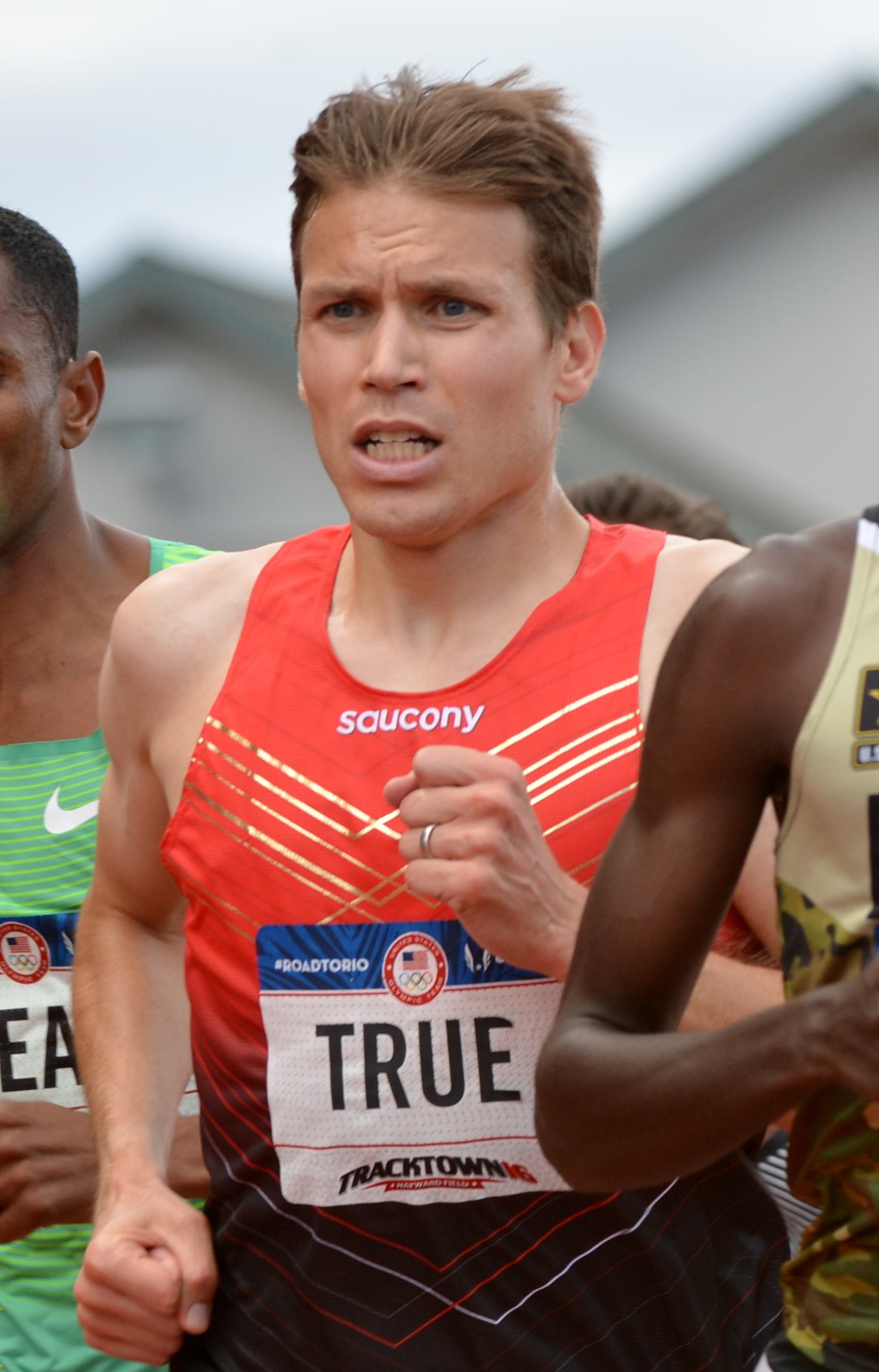
- True running 5000 m at the 2016 Olympic Trials

Personal information
- Born: December 29, 1985 (age 40) North Yarmouth, Maine, U.S.
- Height: 6 ft 0 in (183 cm)
- Weight: 164 lb (74 kg)

Sport
- Sport: Athletics
- Events: 1500 m – 5000 m (track); 5 km – 15 km (road)
- College team: Dartmouth
- Club: Asics Elite Racing
- Coached by: Ray Treacy

Achievements and titles
- Personal bests: 3000 m: 7:35.53 (2017); 5000 m: 13:02.74 (2014); 10,000 m: 27:14.95 (2021)
Medal record
Representing the United States
World Cross Country Championships
Silver medal – second place	2013 Bydgoszcz	Team

Benjamin True (born December 29, 1985) is an American track and field and cross-country athlete, who competed for Dartmouth College and currently trains in Hanover, New Hampshire, while competing for Saucony and In the Arena. True was the top American at both the 2011 and 2013 IAAF World Cross Country Championships, as well as the 2011 USATF Road Running Circuit Champion, winning the 5 km and 10 km Road Championships along the way.

== Personal life ==
True is married to triathlete Sarah True.

== Early career ==
Born and raised in North Yarmouth, Maine, True competed as a Nordic skier and runner throughout his time at Greely High School and Dartmouth College. He earned All-American honors twice at the Foot Locker Cross Country Championships while in high school, twice at the NCAA Men's Cross Country Championship, three times at the NCAA Skiing Championships, once at the NCAA Men's Outdoor Track and Field Championship, and at the 2007 USA Outdoor Track and Field Championships. True studied art history and architecture at Dartmouth.

== Professional career (2009–present) ==
After graduating from Dartmouth, True joined the Oregon Track Club for his first year as a professional runner. While at OTC, he was Top Mainer at the Beach to Beacon 10K in 2009, finishing 10th overall, and represented the Ivy League Alumni Select team at the Izumo Ekiden in Izumo City, Japan.

=== 2010 ===
In the summer of 2010, True returned to Hanover, New Hampshire, to train with In the Arena Track Club, an NGO that provides opportunities for elite athletes to compete professionally while working part-time to strengthen their local communities. True coaches and manages a cross-country and track team at Indian River Middle School in Enfield, New Hampshire.

=== 2011 ===
True joined the Saucony Elite Racing team in 2011. Since joining Saucony, True has improved his track PR's to 7:36:59 for 3000m, 13:02.74 for 5000m, and 27:41.17 for 10,000m. On the roads, he has won four national championships ranging from 5k to 15k, as well as the 2011 United States Road Circuit Championship.

True was also the top American at both the 2011 and 2013 IAAF World Cross Country Championships, finishing 35th and 6th. His 2013 performance was the highest finish for an American since 1995 and led the American team to a second-place finish behind Ethiopia, defeating Kenya for the first time since 1984.

=== 2012 ===
At the 2012 United States Olympic trials (track and field), True placed 12th in the 10,000 meters and sixth in the 5,000 meters. During this period he was still recovering from a case of Lyme Disease.

=== 2013 ===
At the 2013 USA Outdoor Track and Field Championships, True finished 4th in both the 5000m and the 10000m. A top-three finish in either event would have qualified him for the 2013 World Championships in Moscow.

Starting in 2013, True trained with Liberty University alum Sam Chelanga in Hanover, New Hampshire. This continued until early 2015 when Chelanga announced he would be moving to Tucson, Arizona, to train with Coach James Li and his group of athletes including Bernard Lagat, Lawi Lalang and Abdihakem Abdirahman among others.

=== 2014 ===
During the Payton Jordan Invitational track meet in the spring, True ran a world-leading 13:02.74 in the 5000m, winning the race and clocking the 9th fastest time ever run by an American over that distance. True also won the 2014 Manchester Road Race on Thanksgiving Day, outperforming Sam Chelanga during the last half-mile.

=== 2015 ===
On April 18, 2015, True began a breakout year by winning the Boston Athletic Association (B.A.A.) 5K in a new American 5 km road record, 13:22.

In June 2015, True won the New York Diamond League 5000 meters and ran 27:43.79 in a 10 km at 2015 Payton Jordan Invitational in Palo Alto, CA earning a qualifying time for Athletics at the 2016 Summer Olympics and 2015 World Championships in Athletics.

On June 25, Ben True placed second in 10 km and made fourth US team 2015 World Championships in Athletics at 2015 USA Outdoor Track and Field Championships. On July 18, he had another second place in Heusden, Belgium. True placed 6th at 2015 World.

On September 11, True ran 13:05 at Diamond League finale in Brussels.

=== 2016 ===
In spring 2016, True was coached by Tim Broe. May 28, 2016, True placed 11th at the Eugene Diamond League 5000 meters in 13:12.67 in preparation for US Olympic Track and Field Trials in July 2016. He placed fifth in the 5000 m at the Olympic trials with a time of 13:36.40.

On June 17, True placed third in 1500 meters at 2016 adidas BOOST Boston Games in US leading time 3:36.05 behind Nick Willis and Collins Cheboi.

On August 6, True placed first in the 19th TD Beach To Beacon 10K in Cape Elizabeth, Maine, with a time of 28:17. True became the first American and native Maine runner to win the race.

On November 24, True won the 2016 Manchester Road Race, beating out one of the most competitive fields the race has seen. Both True and Leonard Korir were given the same finishing time (21:31), though the win was given to True.

=== 2017 ===
In 2017, True coached himself and trained in Hanover. On April 15, True placed 1st in the B.A.A. 5K in a time of 13:20, breaking his own American 5 km road record.

On May 5, True placed 10th in the 3000 meters at 2017 IAAF Diamond League in a time of 7:47.00 in Doha.

On May 27, True placed 22nd in the 5000 meters at 2017 IAAF Diamond League in a time of 13:28.24 in Eugene Prefontaine Classic.

On June 24, True placed 4th in the 5000 meters at 2017 USA Outdoor Track and Field Championships in a time of 13:17.94 behind winner Paul Chelimo, Eric Jenkins and Ryan Hill.

On July 1, True placed 6th in the 3000 meters at 2017 IAAF Diamond League in a time of 7:35.53 in Paris.

On July 6, True placed 6th in the 5000 meters in Lausanne Athletissima in a time of 13:28.29.

On July 22, True placed 3rd in the 5000 meters at Heusden-Zolder KBC Night of Athletics in a time of 13:10.83.

On August 5, True placed 4th in the 10 km at Cape Elizabeth, Maine, in a time of 27:56.

On August 24, True placed 8th in the 5000 meters at Zürich Weltklasse in a time of 13:17.62.

On August 29, True placed 7th in the 3000 meters in Zagreb Croatia at the IAAF World Challenge in a time of 7:44.36.

In October, True started to train under coach Ray Treacy.

=== 2018 ===
True won the men's race at 2018 United Airlines NYC Half Marathon in time of 1:02:39 over 10,888 finishers.

On April 14, True placed 2nd in the B.A.A. 5K with a time of 13:42. It was a very close finish as Ethiopia's Hagos Gebrhiwet (1st) and American Tommy Curtin were recorded in the same time.

On May 25, True placed 8th in the 2 Mile at the Prefontaine Classic with a time of 8:23.76. He went through 3000 meters in 7:52.36.

True placed 3rd at the Beach to Beacon 10K with a time of 28:29 on August 4.

On August 31, True placed 10th in the Diamond League final 5000 meters, running a near personal best of 13:04.11. American Paul Chelimo went on to break the elusive 13 minute barrier in the same race, placing 6th in 12:57.55.

=== 2019 ===
On April 13, True placed 2nd in the B.A.A. 5K in a time of 13:44.

=== 2021 ===
True spent January and February training in Charlottesville, Virginia, home to the nearby University of Virginia and Reebok Boston Track Club.

On February 20, True ran a 10,000m PR of 27:14.95 at the TEN, a meet held by Sound Running in Southern California. The time was 27 seconds faster than his previous best. He finished 4th to Bowerman teammates Marc Scott, Grant Fisher, and Woody Kincaid and is now the 8th fastest American of all time at the distance. Recent Harvard graduate Kieran Tuntivate finished 5th in 27:17 in the historically fast race. It was his first race since September 2019.

On September 6, True won the USATF 20 km Championships in a time of 59:53. The event was held in New Haven, Connecticut.

On September 11, the Strava club Tour de Woodstock held their first weekly public group run. The club was formed by True, along with his current training partners Dan Curts and Fred Huxham.

In November, True announced he had agreed to a deal with Asics that will run through at least 2023.

On November 7, True took home 7th place at the 2021 New York City Marathon, in a time of 2:12:53. It was his first time competing at the Marathon distance. True was the second American finisher, behind Elkanah Kibet and finished just four seconds ahead of fellow American Nathan Martin.

=== 2023 ===
On April 17, 2023, True finished an impressive 23rd place at the Boston Marathon with a time of 2:16:06.

=== Coaching ===
As of 2024, True transitioned to coaching both professional and amateur distance runners through the club he founded, Northwoods Athletics. In January 2025, True was hired as an assistant coach of cross country and track and field at his alma mater, Dartmouth College.

=== US Teams ===
World team	place
2009 road	13th
2011 12 km xc	35th
2013 12 km xc	6th
2015 10 km outdoor	
2015 5 km outdoor	6th
2019 5 km outdoor	
