= Phillip Kiplimo =

Ugandan long-distance runner

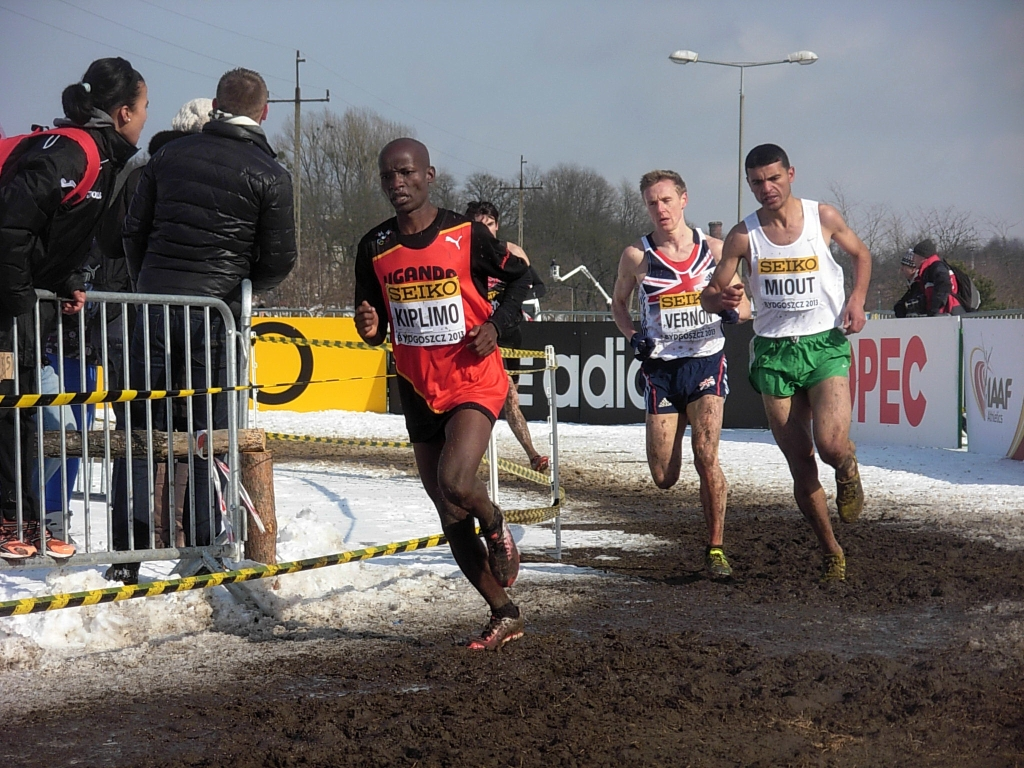
- Philip Kiplimo (left) at the 2013 IAAF World Cross Country Championships

Personal information
- Born: 24 March 1991 (age 34) Chemonges Square, Kapchorwa District, Uganda

Sport
- Sport: Long-distance running
- Event(s): Half marathon, Marathon

Phillip Kiplimo (born 24 March 1991 in Chemonges Square, Kapchorwa) is a Ugandan long-distance runner.

He made his half marathon debut in Kampala in 2012 and ran the distance under one hour and two minutes. He placed seventh at the Zwolle Half Marathon in 2013 and placed fourth on his marathon debut at the 2014 Linz Marathon, running a time of 2:14:14 hours. Despite his lack of international experience, he was selected to represent Uganda in the marathon at the 2014 Commonwealth Games. He managed an eighth-place finish at the 2014 Commonwealth games marathon
