= Tesfaye Abera =

Ethiopian long-distance runner

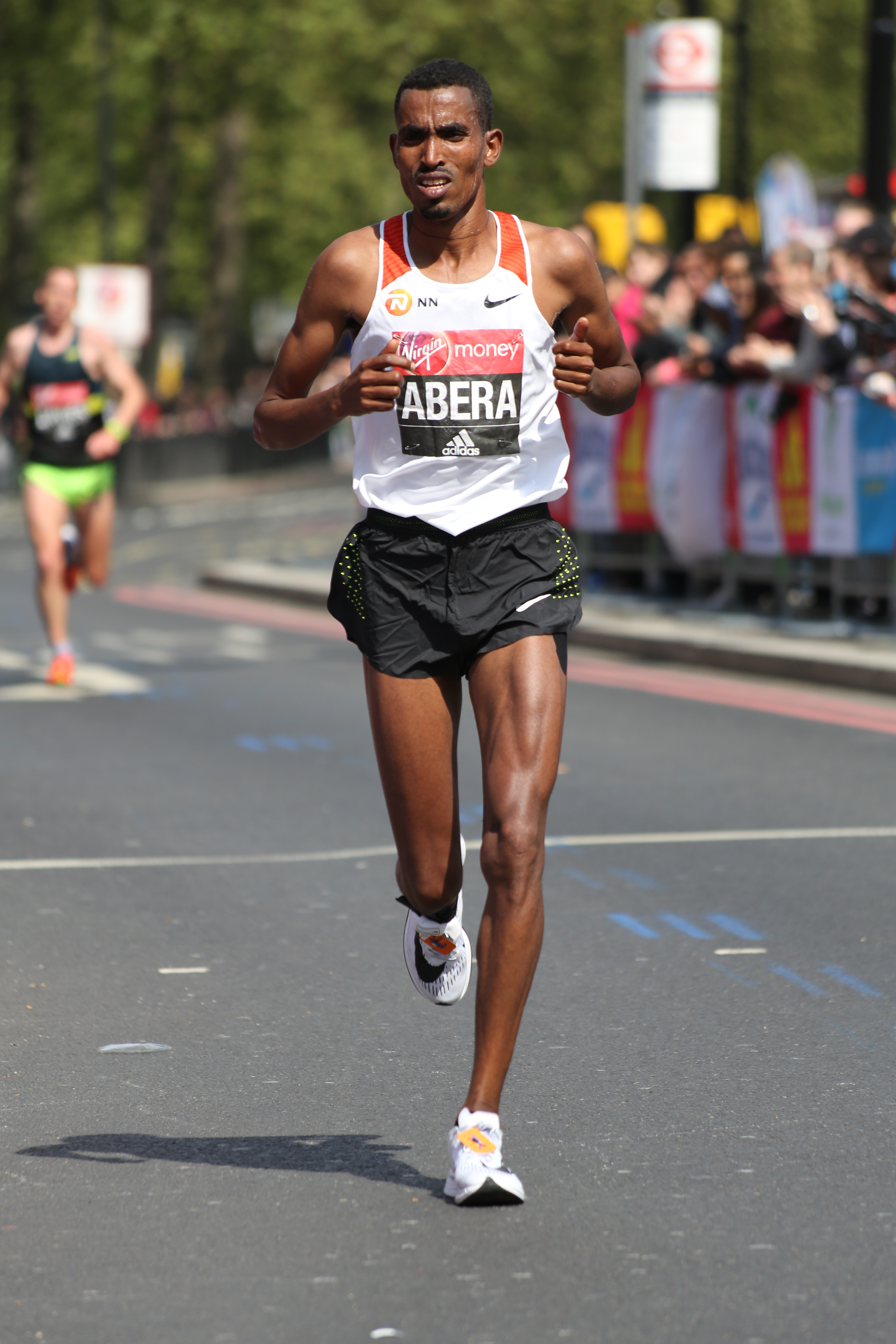
- Abera at the 2017 London Marathon

Personal information
- Born: 31 March 1992 (age 34) Addis Ababa, Ethiopia
- Height: 192 cm (6 ft 4 in)
- Weight: 68 kg (150 lb)

Sport
- Sport: Athletics
- Event: 10,000 m – marathon

Achievements and titles
- Personal bests: 10,000 m – 29:50.1 (2011); 10 km – 28:21 (2013); HM – 60:32 (2012); Marathon – 2:04:24 (2016)

Tesfaye Abera Dibaba (born 31 March 1992) is an Ethiopian long-distance runner who competes in marathons. His personal best of 2:04:24 hours ranks him in the all-time top ten, as of 2016. He has won marathons in Dubai, Hamburg and Mumbai. He twice represented Ethiopia at the IAAF World Cross Country Championships, taking the team title in 2013 and in 2015.

== Career ==
Tesfaye began competing in foreign road races in 2011 and placed sixth at that year's Singelloop Utrecht. He set a half marathon best of 60:32 minutes to place third at the Nice Half Marathon and also took third at the Buenos Aires Half Marathon. In 2013, a fifth-place finish at the Jan Meda International earned him selection for Ethiopia at the 2013 IAAF World Cross Country Championships. On his international debut he finished 14th and helped Ethiopia to the team title. He ran in several European road races later that year but failed to place in the top three at all but the Corrida de Langueux, where he was the winner. His 2014 was low-key, as he neither improved his bests nor had a podium finish.

The 2015 marked a breakthrough for Tesfaye as he won his marathon debut with a run of 2:09:46 hours at the Mumbai Marathon. He was reselected for the 2015 IAAF World Cross Country Championships, but failed to build on his previous success, ending in 26th place. He ran in two further marathons that year, taking eighth at the high-profile Hamburg Marathon (2:10:49) and the runner-up spot and the lower level Hengshui Lake International Marathon (2:10:00).

The 2016 season marked a sudden improvement for Tesfaye's running. Opening at the Dubai Marathon, he led in a very fast-paced race and out-sprinted defending champion Lemi Berhanu Hayle in the final section to win 2:04:24 hours. This was one second off the course record and represented a personal best by over five minutes. The time moved him into ninth place on the all-time marathon lists and third among Ethiopians, after Dubai course record holder Ayele Abshero and former world record holder Haile Gebrselassie. He continued his winning ways at the Hamburg Marathon that April, beating Philemon Rono with another quick run of 2:06:58 hours.

== International competitions ==
Year	Competition	Venue	Position	Event	Notes
2013	World Cross Country Championships	Bydgoszcz, Poland	14th	Senior race	33:35
2013	World Cross Country Championships	Bydgoszcz, Poland	1st	Senior team	38 pts
2015	Mumbai Marathon	Mumbai, India	1st	Marathon	2:09:46
2015	World Cross Country Championships	Guiyang, China	26th	Senior race	36:59
2015	Hamburg Marathon	Hamburg, Germany	8th	Marathon	2:10:49
2015	Hengshui Lake Marathon	Hengshui, China	2nd	Marathon	2:10:00
2016	Dubai Marathon	Dubai, United Arab Emirates	1st	Marathon	2:04:24
2016	Hamburg Marathon	Hamburg, Germany	1st	Marathon	2:06:58
2016	Olympic Games	Rio de Janeiro, Brazil	—	Marathon	DNF
2017	London Marathon	London, United Kingdom	18th	Marathon	2:16:09
2017	Amsterdam Marathon	Amsterdam, Netherlands	8th	Marathon	2:07:39

== Road race wins ==
- Corrida de Langueux: 2013
- Mumbai Marathon: 2015
- Dubai Marathon: 2016
- Hamburg Marathon: 2016
