= 2024 World Athletics Indoor Championships – Men's 1500 metres =

Men's 1500 metres at the 2024 World Athletics Indoor Championships
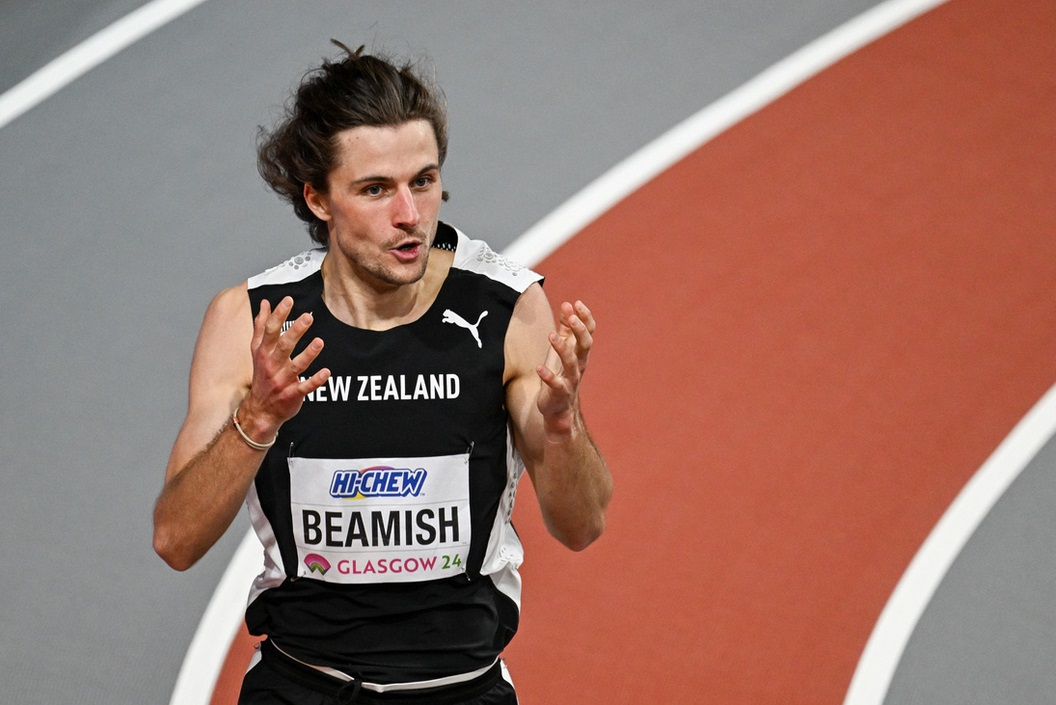
- Venue: Commonwealth Arena
- Dates: 1–3 March
- Competitors: 29 from 23 nations
- Winning time: 3:36.54

Medalists
gold medal	Geordie Beamish	New Zealand
silver medal	Cole Hocker	United States
bronze medal	Hobbs Kessler	United States

The men's 1500 metres at the 2024 World Athletics Indoor Championships took place on 1–3 March 2024.

== Results ==
=== Heats ===
Qualification: First 3 in each heat (Q) advance to the Finals. The heats were started at 20:10.

==== Heat 1 ====
Rank	Athlete	Nation	Time	Notes
1	Cole Hocker	United States	3:39.32	Q
2	Samuel Pihlström	Sweden	3:39.63	Q
3	Samuel Tefera	Ethiopia	3:39.66	Q
4	Kristian Uldbjerg Hansen	Denmark	3:39.81	
5	Yervand Mkrtchyan	Armenia	3:42.45	
6	Adam Fogg	Great Britain	3:48.47	qR
7	Andrew Boniphace Rhobi	Tanzania	3:51.44	PB
8	Alex Macuácua	Mozambique	3:57.13	SB

==== Heat 2 ====
Rank	Athlete	Nation	Time	Notes
1	Narve Gilje Nordås	Norway	3:42.09	Q
2	Adel Mechaal	Spain	3:42.85	Q
3	Ryan Mphahlele	South Africa	3:42.97	Q
4	Filip Sasínek	Czech Republic	3:43.82	
5	Hicham Akankam	Morocco	3:44.30	
6	Nursultan Keneshbekov	Kyrgyzstan	3:47.86	
7	Fayez Abdullah Al-Subaie	Saudi Arabia	3:48.73	NR

==== Heat 3 ====
Rank	Athlete	Nation	Time	Notes
1	Isaac Nader	Portugal	3:45.50	Q
2	Kieran Lumb	Canada	3:45.66	Q
3	Mario García	Spain	3:46.48	Q
4	Tshepo Tshite	South Africa	3:46.70	
5	Rob Napolitano	Puerto Rico	3:48.92	
6	Biniam Mehary	Ethiopia	3:55.81	qR
7	Eduardo Herrera	Mexico	4:02.94	SB

==== Heat 4 ====
Rank	Athlete	Nation	Time	Notes
1	Vincent Kibet Keter	Kenya	3:38.96	Q
2	Hobbs Kessler	United States	3:39.07	Q
3	Geordie Beamish	New Zealand	3:39.17	Q, SB
4	Elzan Bibić	Serbia	3:39.98	SB
5	Charles Philibert-Thiboutot	Canada	3:40.18	
6	Thomas Vanoppen	Belgium	3:50.70	
—	Callum Elson	Great Britain	DNF	

=== Final ===
The final was started at 21:30.

Rank	Name	Nationality	Time	Notes
1st place, gold medalist(s)	Geordie Beamish	New Zealand	3:36.54	PB
2nd place, silver medalist(s)	Cole Hocker	United States	3:36.69	PB
3rd place, bronze medalist(s)	Hobbs Kessler	United States	3:36.72	
4	Isaac Nader	Portugal	3:36.97	
5	Narve Gilje Nordås	Norway	3:37.03	PB
6	Adel Mechaal	Spain	3:37.76	
7	Samuel Tefera	Ethiopia	3:38.10	
8	Samuel Pihlström	Sweden	3:38.35	
9	Biniam Mehary	Ethiopia	3:40.00	
10	Vincent Kibet Keter	Kenya	3:40.04	
11	Mario García	Spain	3:40.48	
12	Ryan Mphahlele	South Africa	3:41.08	
13	Kieran Lumb	Canada	3:41.37	
14	Adam Fogg	Great Britain	3:43.81	
