= Philemon Rono =

Kenyan long-distance runner

Personal information
- Nationality: Kenyan
- Born: 8 February 1991 (age 35)

Sport
- Country: Kenya
- Sport: Athletics
- Event: Long-distance running
- Team: NN Running Team

Philemon Rono (born 8 February 1991), nicknamed the "baby police", is a Kenyan long-distance runner who specializes in the marathon. He holds the Canadian all-comers' record in the marathon, having run the fastest marathon ever in Canada of 2:05:00 to win the 2019 Toronto Waterfront Marathon. Rono is a three-time winner of this marathon, having won the race in 2016, 2017 and 2019.

== Career ==
=== 2010: Early career ===
Philemon Rono started his international career on the track in 2010 recording personal bests of 8:02.28 in the 3000m in Pliezhausen, Germany and 13:36.23 in the 5000m in Oordegem, Belgium.

=== 2011–2013: Transition to road racing ===
In 2011 Rono won the Tilburg 10 Miles in the Netherlands and placed sixth at the Dam tot Damloop 10 miles.

In 2012 he made his half marathon debut at the Prague Half Marathon in 1:04:16. The next month Rono won the Paderborn Half Marathon in Germany in 1:00:58. Later in the year he returned to the Tilburg Ten Miles and placed sixth in a personal best time of 45:57.

In 2013 Philemon won the Kenyan Cross Country Championships in Nairobi to qualify for the 2013 World Cross Country Championships in Bydgoszcz, Poland. At the 2013 World Cross Country Championships he placed 36th; the race was won by his compatriot Japhet Korir. On 25 May, Rono ran a 10,000m personal best of 28:18.5 to place second at the Nairobi Kenyan Police Championships in Nairobi. He went on to finish eighth at the Kenyan National Championships on 22 June, also in Nairobi. Later in the year he placed second in the Lille Half Marathon running a personal best time of 1:00:39.

=== 2014–2018: Beginning of a marathon career ===
On 4 May 2014 Rono made his marathon debut at the Hamburg Marathon, where he placed third in a time of 2:07:07, the race was won by Shumi Dechasa in 2:06:43. On 6 September he placed third at the Lille Half Marathon in 1:00:52. On 19 October he competed at the Amsterdam Marathon, placing 7th in 2:10:23.

In 2015 Rono returned to Hamburg, where he placed fourth in the Hamburg Marathon in a time of 2:08:18. The race was won by fellow Kenyan Lucas Rotich in 2:07:17. On 23 August he raced the Klagenfurt Half Marathon in Austria, placing second in 1:02:02. His second marathon race of the year came at the Valencia Marathon, where he placed fifth in 2:08:47.

In 2016 Rono first placed third at the Nairobi First Lady's Half Marathon before returning to Hamburg. On 17 April he placed second at the Hamburg Marathon in a time of 2:07:20. The race was won by Tesfaye Abera in 2:06:58. On 16 October he raced the Toronto Waterfront Marathon and won the race in 2:08:26.

In 2017 he raced the Rotterdam Marathon on 9 April, finishing eighth in 2:09:22. On 2 September Rono returned to the Lille Half Marathon, where he placed 13th in 2:03:55. He then returned in turn to Toronto for the Toronto Waterfront Marathon on 22 October, where he successfully defended his title, winning the race in 2:06:52.

In 2018 Rono raced the Boston Marathon, however he did not finish the race, which was won by Yuki Kawauchi. On 21 October he returned to Toronto to defend his title at the Toronto Waterfront Marathon and finished ninth in 2:13:37.

=== 2019–present: Breakthrough ===
Rono returned to the Boston Marathon, where he DNF-ed in 2018 on 15 April, this time placing sixth in 2:08:57. On 31 August he returned to racing in Lille to run the Semi Marathon, placing 12th in 1:01:24. Rono next raced the Toronto Waterfront Marathon, where he regained his title winning the race in a Canadian all-comers' record of 2:05:00.

2020 saw Rono race one marathon; the Valencia Marathon on 6 December. He placed 10th in the race in a time of 2:05:37. The race was won by fellow Kenyan Evans Chebet, and 11 men broke 2:06:00 in the race.

In 2021 Rono raced one marathon when on 26 November he placed sixth at the Abu Dhabi Marathon in 2:12:31. The race was won by his compatriot Titus Ekiru.

== Personal bests ==
Event	Time	Date	Place
3000 m	8:02.28	16 May 2010	Pliezhausen
5000 m	13:36.23	5 June 2010	Oordegem
10,000 m	28:18.5h	25 May 2013	Nairobi
10 km	28:37	19 May 2013	Bangaluru
10 miles	45:57	2 September 2012	Tilburg
Half Marathon	1:00:39	31 August 2013	Lille
Marathon	2:05:00	20 October 2019	Toronto

== Personal life ==
He is part of the NN Running Team based in Kaptagat, Kenya. He trains with the likes of Eliud Kipchoge, Abel Kirui and Gideon Kipketer. Rono supports Chelsea Football Club in the Premier League.
