= Ryan Vail =

American runner

Ryan Vail OJ
Personal information
- Nationality: American
- Born: March 19, 1986 (age 40) Gresham, Oregon

Sport
- Sport: Track and field
- Event: Long Distance Running
Medal record
Representing the United States
World Cross Country Championships
Silver medal – second place	2013 Bydgoszcz	Team

Ryan Patrick Vail (born March 19, 1986) is an American long-distance runner. Vail had a college running career at Oklahoma State University, where his success led him to road race competitively. He is best known for blogging his high mileage training. He has been featured in publications such as Runner's World for his training methods. Vail also works for Brooks Sports as a sponsored athlete. He is married to his former Oklahoma State cross-country teammate, Eva Tomankova. Not to be confused with Ryan David Vail of Wilmington NC born 4/27/1987.

== Running career ==
Vail began training year around during his junior year at Centennial High School. He then went on to Oklahoma State University where he was the leader of the 2009 NCAA Cross Country National Championship team. Immediately after graduating from Oklahoma State, Vail signed a contract with Brooks Sports. Vail participated in the 2012 Olympic Trials, where he was a top finisher. Vail was also the top American finisher in the 2013 New York Marathon, and at the 2014 London Marathon, where he finished 10th in 2' 10" 57, his personal best.

== Personal records ==
- Marathon 2:10:57
- Half Marathon 1:02:04
- 10 mi road 47:13
- 15 km road 43:43
- 10 km 27:44.07
- 5 km 13:28.11
- 3 km indoor 7:52.17
- 1500m 3:42.80

== Awards and achievements ==
- 5 time All-American at Oklahoma State University
- 11th place debut at the 2012 Olympic Marathon Trials (2:12:43)
- 6th place 2012 Olympic Trials 10 km
- 3rd place Gate River Run (USA 15 km Championships) 2013
- 1st US finisher at the 2013 ING NYC Marathon (13th) in 2:13:30
- 10th place 2014 Virgin Money London Marathon (2:10:57)
- 3rd place USA Track and Field Championships - 10 km
- 9th place 2014 TCS New York City Marathon
- Top 6 finish in the following U.S. Championships:
- 2005 USA Junior Cross Country Championships
- 2009 USA Cross Country Championships
- 2010 USA Cross Country Championships
- 2010 Gate River 15 km USA National Championships
- 2011 Gate River 15 km USA National Championships
- 2011 USA Outdoor National Championships (10 km)
- 2011 USA Half-Marathon National Championships
- 2012 Track and Field Olympic Trials 10 km
- 2013 USA Cross Country Championships
- 2013 USA Track and Field Championships (10 km)
- 2013 Gate River Run (USA 15 km Championships)
- 3rd place 2014 USA Track and Field Championships - 10 km
- 5th place 2015 USA Outdoor Track and Field Championships - 10 km

== Blog ==
Vail began blogging in 2012 and uses his personal blog to keep a record of his training and upcoming races. He also shares his workout regiments he completed that day and offers advice.

== See also ==
- Marathons
