= Tumisang Monnatlala =

South African athlete

Personal information
- Born: 31 January 1995 (age 31)

Sport
- Sport: Athletics
- Event: 3000 m steeplechase

Tumisang Monnatlala (born 31 January 1995) is a South African steeplechase runner. He competed in the 3000 metres steeplechase event at the 2015 World Championships in Beijing without qualifying for the final.

== Competition record ==
Year	Competition	Venue	Position	Event	Notes
Representing South Africa
2014	World Junior Championships	Eugene, United States	13th	3000 m s'chase	9:04.26
2015	World Championships	Beijing, China	32nd (h)	3000 m s'chase	8:55.25

== Personal bests ==
Outdoor

- 1500 metres – 3:49.56 (Stellenbosch 2012)
- 3000 metres – 8:34.1 (Pretoria 2012)
- 3000 metres steeplechase – 8:33.02 (Stellenbosch 2015)
