= Mason Ferlic =

American long-distance runner

Personal information
- Born: August 5, 1993 (age 32) Saint Paul, Minnesota

Sport
- Country: United States
- Sport: Track and Field
- College team: Michigan Wolverines
- Club: Very Nice Track Club
- Team: Adidas
- Coached by: Ron Warhurst

Mason Ferlic (born August 5, 1993) is an American long-distance runner. He competed in the steeplechase during the 2020 Summer Olympics.

== Early life ==
Ferlic attended Mounds Park Academy in Maplewood, Minnesota. His Junior year he won the state 3200m and fisnished runner up in the 1600m. The following year he won the state cross country meet as well as the 1600m and 3200m in track. He was named the Minnesota Gatorade track and field athlete of the year in 2011.

== College career ==
Ferlic ran for the Michigan Wolverines. He ended his freshman year of cross country by making the varsity roster for NCAA nationals where he finished in 252nd, last place in the race. He redshirted his freshman year for indoor and outdoor track.

During the 2013 cross country season he finished 22nd at NCAA nationals earning All-American honors. The following year he finished 13th at the some meet.

Ferlic had great success in the steeplechase while at Michigan. He had a 4th-place finish in 2014 and a 12th-place finish in 2015 before winning the race in 2016. He finished his Michigan career as a Five-time Big Ten Champion, and an 11 time Big Ten Athlete of the Week.

== Professional career ==
Upon finishing college, Felic signed with the athlete agency Aurum Sports Group in June 2016. The next month, he signed a contract with Nike.

In 2019, Ferlic competed in the senior men's race at the 2019 IAAF World Cross Country Championships held in Aarhus, Denmark. He finished in 76th place.

In 2021, he placed third in the 3000m steeplechase at the US Olympic Trials. Ferlic competed in the men's 3000 metres steeplechase event at the 2020 Summer Olympics held in Tokyo, Japan.

In November 2021 Ferlic announced via an instagram post that he had signed a contract with Adidas.

== Personal bests ==
Taken from World Athletics Profile

Surface	Event	Time	Date	Venue
Indoor track	3000m	7:45.86	February 6, 2022	Ocean Breeze Athletic Complex
Indoor track	5000m	13:29.33	January 27, 2023	Boston University
Outdoor track	1500m	3:35.45	May 29, 2021	Griswold Stadium
Outdoor track	One mile	3:58.05	January 19, 2021	Clermont, Florida
Outdoor track	3000m	7:49.68	August 2, 2022	Nembro, Italy
Outdoor track	5000m	13:24.94	May 9, 2021	Hilmer Lodge Stadium
Outdoor track	Steeplechase	8:16.03	July 21, 2023	Stade Louis II
