= Reebok Boston Track Club =

American training group sponsored by Reebok

- Abbreviation: RBTC
- Formation: 2018; 8 years ago
- Type: Elite athlete training group
- Location: Charlottesville, VA
- Region served: United States
- Website: reebok.com/bostontrackclub

The Reebok Boston Track Club (RBTC) is an American training group sponsored by Reebok for professional distance runners (known as "RBTC Elite") as well as a separate recreational club for casual runners. RBTC Elite is supported by head coach Chris John Fox.

RBTC athletes won one medal at the 2018 NACAC Championships in Athletics.

== Roster ==
The Reebok Boston Track Club hosts the following athletes:

=== Men ===
- Justyn Knight
- Martin Hehir
- Graham Crawford
- Colin Bennie

=== Women ===
- Amy-Eloise Markovc
