= Morgan Beadlescomb =

American middle-distance and long-distance runner

Personal information
- Nationality: American
- Born: June 1, 1998 (age 28)

Sport
- College team: Michigan State Spartans
- Club: Adidas; Very Nice Track Club

Morgan Beadlescomb (born June 1, 1998) is an American middle-distance and long-distance runner currently representing Adidas.

== Early years ==
Beadlescomb attended Algonac High School in Algonac, Michigan. He won the Lower Peninsula D2 Cross Country state finals in 2014 and 2015. On the track he was the 2015 and 2016 Lower Peninsula D2 state champions in the 1600 running 4:13 both years. After his senior year was awarded the Times Herald Male Runner of the Year.

== Collegiate career ==
After high school he attended Michigan State University for six years earning both a bachelors and a master's degree. He had lots of athletic success at Michigan State including a 3rd pace finish at the 2021 NCAA Indoor Championships in the 5000m, a 2nd-place finish at the 2022 NCAA Indoor Championships in the Mile, and another 2nd-place finish at the 2022 NCAA Championships in the 5000m.

In February 2022 Beadlescomb was a last minute entry into an indoor meet in Chicago where he broke his mile PR by over 9 seconds running 3:52.03 for the 4th fastest time in NCAA history. He finished behind the Oregon Alumni Duo of Cooper Teare and Cole Hocker.

== Professional career ==
In the late summer of 2022, Beadlescomb started training with Very Nice Track Club in Ann Arbor, Michigan, under coach Ron Warhurst. On October 4, 2022, he announced via an Instagram post that he had signed a contract with Adidas.

On Thanksgiving Day, 2023, he won the Manchester Roadrace, outkicking 2022 winner and course record-holder, Conner Mantz. After the race, he proposed to his girlfriend, Lexi Heger, who said yes.

== Results and personal bests ==
Championship Results

Year	Meet	Venue	Event	Place	Time
2019	NCAA Outdoor Championships	Mike A. Myers Stadium	5000m	13th	14:17.59
2021	NCAA Indoor Championships	Randall Tyson Track Center	5000m	3rd	13:29.96
2021	NCAA Outdoor Championships	Hayward Field	5000m	8th	13:21.40
2021	US Outdoor Championships	Hayward Field	5000m	6th	13:30.90
2022	NCAA Indoor Championships	Birmingham CrossPlex	Mile	2nd	4:07.59
2022	NCAA Indoor Championships	Birmingham CrossPlex	3000m	12th	8:04.87
2022	NCAA Outdoor Championships	Hayward Field	5000m	2nd	13:28.38
2022	US Outdoor Championships	Hayward Field	5000m	9th	13:24.20
2023	US Outdoor Championships	Hayward Field	5000m	13th	13:38.69
2024	US Indoor Championships	Albuquerque Convention Center	3000m	3rd	7:56.70
2024	US Outdoor Championships	Hayward Field	5000m	11th	13:37.69

Personal bests

Surface	Event	Time	Date	Venue	Notes
Indoor track	Mile	3:52.03	February 11, 2022	Gately Indoor TF Center, Chicago	
Indoor track	3000m	7:42.90	February 4, 2023	The Track at New Balance, Boston	
Indoor track	5000m	13:03.57	January 26. 2024	Boston University	
Outdoor track	800m	1:47.85	April 23, 2022	Billy Hayes T&F Complex, Bloomington, Indiana	
Outdoor track	1500m	3:35.84	May 17, 2024	Los Angeles, California	
Outdoor track	One Mile Road	3:58.01	December 9, 2023	Kapiolani Park, Honolulu	
Outdoor track	3000m	7:36.10	July 20, 2024	Olympic Stadium, London	
Outdoor track	5000m	13:08:82	May 26, 2023	Drake Stadium, Azusa, California	
Outdoor track	10,000m	28:54.93	May 13, 2022	University of Minnesota T&F Stadium, Minneapolis	
