= Mehdi Belhadj =

French steeplechase runner

Personal information
- Nationality: French
- Born: 10 June 1995 (age 31) Villeneuve-la-Garenne, France

Sport
- Country: France
- Sport: Track and Field
- Event: 3000 metres steeplechase

Achievements and titles
- Personal bests: Outdoor; 800 m: 1:49.77 (St-Maur 2015); 1500 m: 3:38.13 (Nancy 2019); 5000 m: 13:50.97 (Decines 2022); 3000 m SC: 8:12.43 (Monaco 2021); 5km: 13:38 (Barcelona 2021); 10km: 28:51 (Houilles 2019); Indoor; 1500 m: 3:40.65 (Karlsruhe 2019); 3000 m: 7:58.09 (Miramas 2021)
Medal record
European Team Championships
Silver medal – second place	2021 Silesia	3000 m steeplechase

Mehdi Belhadj (born 10 June 1995) is a French middle and long-distance runner, who specializes in the 3000 metres steeplechase. He competed in the 3000 m steeplechase at the 2022 World Athletics Championships, where he qualified for the final.
