= Geordie Beamish =

New Zealand long-distance runner (born 1996)

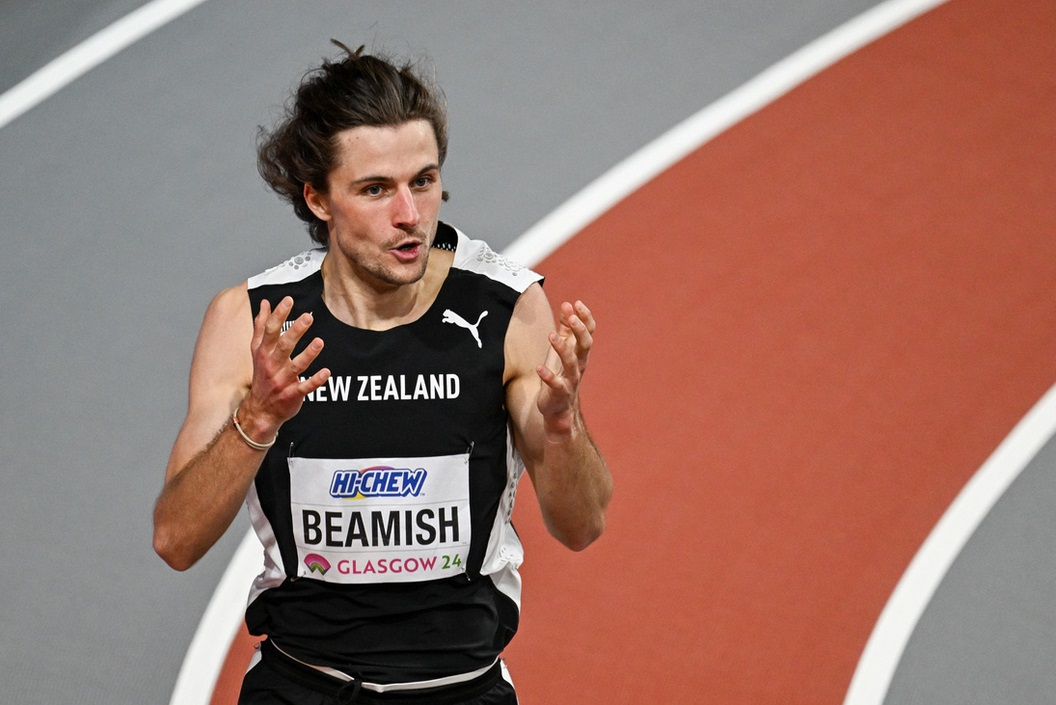
- Beamish after winning the 1500 m at the 2024 World Athletics Indoor Championships

Personal information
- Born: 24 October 1996 (age 30) Hastings, New Zealand

Sport
- Country: New Zealand
- Sport: Track and field
- Events: 1500 m; 3000 m; 3000 m steeplechase; 5000 m
- University team: Northern Arizona Lumberjacks
- Club: On Athletics Club
- Coached by: Dathan Ritzenhein (2020–present)

Achievements and titles
- World finals: 2023; 3,000 m st., 5th 2025; 3,000 m st., Gold
- Personal bests: 1500 m: 3:34.47+ (Eugene 2024); Mile: 3:49.09 (Eugene 2024); 3000 m: 7:42.39 (Rovereto 2021); 3000 m st.: 8:09.64 AR (Paris 2024); 5000 m: 13:14.79 (Montesson 2023); Indoor; 1500 m: 3:36.54i (Glasgow 2024); Mile: 3:51.22i (Boston 2023); 3000 m: 7:34.88i+ (New York City 2024); 2 miles: 8:05.73i; 5000 m: 13:04.33i AR (Boston 2024); Road; 5 km: 13:36 NR (Boston 2022)
Medal record
Men's athletics
Representing New Zealand
World Championships
Gold medal – first place	2025 Tokyo	3000 m st.
World Indoor Championships
Gold medal – first place	2024 Glasgow	1500 m

George Beamish (born 24 October 1996) is a New Zealand middle- and long-distance runner, who is the reigning 2025 World Athletics Champion at the 3000 m steeplechase. He also won the 1500 metres at the 2024 World Indoor Championships. He holds the Oceania area record in the 3000 m steeplechase of 8:09.64 and the New Zealand record in the indoor 3000 and 5000 m.

== Personal life ==
Beamish was born to parents Simon and Josi Beamish. He has three siblings: Hugo, Lucinda, and Eve Beamish. Hugo is also an athlete, having run cross country and track at Villanova University. George attended Whanganui Collegiate as a boarder from 2012 to 2014 (from Year 10).

Alongside OAC teammates Morgan McDonald and Olli Hoare, Beamish hosts the Coffee Club Podcast in which they discuss their lives as professional runners.

== Junior career ==
Beamish was the NZ Under-18 2000 m steeplechase champion in 2013 and the NZ Junior Men's 1500 m champion in 2014 and 2015. He was also the NZ Junior Men's 3000 m champion in 2015. He won the New Zealand secondary schools senior cross-county championships in 2014.

== Collegiate career ==
Beamish attended Northern Arizona University, where he competed for the Northern Arizona Lumberjacks and was coached by Mike Smith. He was NCAA Division I Indoor Men's Mile champion in 2019 and is a two-time NCAA All-American in cross country (2017, 2018).

=== 2016 ===
On 30 January, Beamish made his debut for NAU running a 4:24.48 mile in Flagstaff. He competed in four indoor meets, setting a mile personal best of 4:07.59 at the Iowa State classic.

In his debut collegiate cross country season, Beamish placed ninth at the Big Sky Championship, and finished 97th at the NCAA Division I Cross Country Championships, as the seventh man on the NAU championship winning squad.

=== 2017 ===
Indoors, Beamish set a personal best time in the 3000 m of 8:10.06 at the Iowa State Classic.

He opened the outdoor season with a personal best of 13:53.59 over 5000 m at the Stanford Invitational, followed by a 3:41.87 1500 m personal best at the Bryan Clay Invitational.

Beamish ended his outdoor season finishing eighth in the 5000 m at the Big Sky Championships and tenth in his heat of the 1500 m at the NCAA West Preliminaries.

He finished his second collegiate cross country season by placing 40th at the national meet, earning All American honors and another national team title with NAU.

=== 2018 ===
Beamish competed in just one race during the outdoor season (after suffering injury) where he finished 13th over 5000 m in 13:55.65 at the Stanford Invitational.

During the cross country season, he placed placed fourth at the Big Sky Cross Country Championship, 14th at the Nuttycombe Wisconsin Invitational, and 25th at Wisconsin Pre-Nationals. To finish the season, he earned All-American status and placed 39th in at the NCAA Championship.

=== 2019 ===
On 23 February, he won the Big Sky Conference Indoor Men's Mile Champion with a time of 4:10.90. He then won an NCAA title in the mile at the NCAA Division I Indoor Championship, in a time of 4:07.69. Outdoors, he set a 5000 m personal best at the Payton Jordan Invite with a time of 13:31.58. At the NCAA Division I Outdoor Championship, he placed 10th in the 5000 m with a time of 14:13.18.

In cross country, he won the NCAA D1 Mountain Region Championship, and finished 37th at the NCAA national championship.

=== 2020 ===
In early 2020, Beamish set a personal best of 7:44.67 over 3000 m at the Boston University Valentine Invitational, and finished sixth at the Millrose Games Wanamaker Mile in a personal best time of 3:56.90.

== Professional career ==
=== 2020–2021 ===
In August 2020, Beamish turned professional, joining the newly formed On Athletics Club, coached by US Olympian Dathan Ritzenhein.

In August 2021, after missing out on the postponed 2020 Summer Olympics, Beamish ran personal bests of 3:54.86 in the mile at the Prefontaine Classic and 7:42.39 over 3000 m in Rovereto, Italy.

In December 2021, he set a New Zealand indoor record in the 5000 m at Boston University with a time of 13:12.53.

=== 2022 ===
At the Millrose Games on 29 January, Beamish won the 3000 m in a New Zealand national indoor record of 7:39.50.

In March, he competed in the 3000 m at the World Athletics Indoor Championships in Belgrade, Serbia. In the preliminary round, he placed second in his heat and then finished 10th in the final in a time of 7:46.91.

Outdoors, he set a personal best of 3:36.53 in the 1500 m at the Sound Running TEN and an outdoor 5000 m personal best of 13:19.90 at the Paris Diamond League. At the 2022 World Athletics Championships in Eugene, Oregon, he competed in the 5000 m, where he was eliminated in the heats.

He finished his season with two sixth-place finishes at the 2022 Commonwealth Games 5000 m and the Fifth Avenue Mile.

=== 2023 ===
At the 2023 Millrose Games, Beamish finished sixth in the 3000 m to lower his own New Zealand record to 7:36.22. Two weeks later, at the BU Last Chance qualifier, he set a personal best in the mile of 3:51.22, just missing Nick Willis' New Zealand national indoor mile record of 3:51.06.

On 13 April, Beamish made his debut in the 3000 metres steeplechase at Mt. SAC in a time of 8:42.56. On 21 July, he set an Oceanian record of 8:13.26 in the event at the Monaco Diamond League, and on 22 August he finished fifth at the 2023 World Athletics Championships in the 3000 m steeplechase in Budapest, Hungary.

In September, he finished third in both the Fifth Avenue Mile, in 3:50, and the steeplechase at the Diamond League Final in Eugene, Oregon, in a time of 8:14.01.

=== 2024 ===
On 26 January, Beamish finished fourth in a 5000 m in 13:04.33 at the Boston University John Thomas Terrier Classic. This time, he broke his own New Zealand indoor record and also bettered the New Zealand outdoor record. It was also under the Olympic standard of 13:05.00.

Two weeks later at the 2024 Millrose Games, Beamish set an Oceanian record in the indoor 2 miles in a time of 8:05.73. In the process, he recorded a 3000m time of 7:34.88, faster than the New Zealand record, but Athletics New Zealand does not at present recognise intermediate times for national records.

On 3 March, Beamish won the gold medal in the 1500 m at the 2024 World Athletics Indoor Championships.

On 7 July, Beamish improved his Oceanian record to 8:09.64, finishing fifth in the 3000 m steeplechase at the Meeting de Paris.

=== 2025 ===
On 15 September 2025, Beamish won the 3000 m Steeplechase at the 2025 World Athletics Championships in Tokyo. He became the first non-African born male runner to win the event in any Olympics or World Championships since 1987.
