= Ron Warhurst =

American sports coach and Purple Heart recipient (born 1942)

Ron Warhurst (born 21 July 1942) is an American track and field coach. He was the head coach of the University of Michigan's men's track and field team from 2000 to 2008. Warhurst was also a member of the cross country teams at Western Michigan that won consecutive NCAA championships in 1964 and 1965.

From 1968 to 1970, Warhurst served in the U.S. Marine Corps and was awarded two Purple Hearts and a Navy Commendation Medal for service in Vietnam. He became the University of Michigan's cross country coach in 1974, a position he held for more than 35 years. He also served as assistant coach of the men's track and field team for 26 years. In 2000, Warhurst took over as head coach of the track team. Warhurst coached 44 All-Americans and 12 Olympians at Michigan. His 2004 team finished fifth at the NCAA indoor championship. In 2008, Warhurst's team won the school's first Big Ten outdoor championship since 1983. Michigan won six individual Big Ten event championships in 2008, and Warhurst was named Big Ten Coach of the Year and Great Lakes Regional Coach of the Year.

During the Warhurst era, Michigan's middle distance runners excelled. In 2003, Canadian runner Nate Brannen won the NCAA indoor championship in the 800-meter run. In 2005, middle distance runner Nick Willis from New Zealand won the NCAA indoor championship in the mile run. A third middle distance runner, Andrew Ellerton won the NCAA outdoor championship in the 800-meter run in 2007. Michigan also dominated the distance medley event in the mid-2000s, winning the NCAA indoor championship in 2004 (with a team of DarNell Talbert, Ellerton, Willis, and Brannen) and again in 2005 (with a team of Rondell Ruff, Stan Waithe, Ellerton, and Brannen).

Three Michigan middle distance runners qualified for the 1,500 meter race at the 2008 Summer Olympics in Beijing—Nick Willis for New Zealand and Kevin Sullivan and Nate Brannen for Canada. Willis won the gold medal in the 1,500 meter race at the 2006 Commonwealth Games and the silver medal in the same event at the Beijing Olympics.

Michigan's sprinters and hurdlers also excelled in the late 2000s. In 2007, Jeff Porter won the NCAA indoor championship in the 60-meter hurdles. Sprinter Adam Harris was named the 2008 Big Ten Track Athlete of the Year after winning Big Ten event championships in the 60 meters (indoors), 200 meters and 4x100 meter relay. Harris ran a personal best 20.68 seconds in the 200-meter race at the NCAA Mideast Regional and qualified to compete for Guyana in that event at the 2008 Olympics.

Warhurst remained at Michigan as the head coach of the cross country team after 2008 and became the associate head coach of the track and field team in 2009. In July 2010, Warhurst announced his retirement from the University of Michigan at age 67.

To the current date, he currently coaches the athletes at Skyline High School and of the Very Nice Track Club.
