= 2013 IAAF World Cross Country Championships =

40th World Cross Country Championships
- Organisers: IAAF
- Edition: 40th
- Date: 24 March
- Host city: Bydgoszcz, Poland
- Venue: Myślęcinek Park
- Events: 4
- Distances: 12 km – Senior men 8 km – Junior men 8 km – Senior women 6 km – Junior women
- Participation: 398 athletes from 41 nations
- Official website: Bydgoszcz 2013

The 2013 IAAF World Cross Country Championships took place on March 24, 2013. The races were held at the Myślęcinek Park in Bydgoszcz, Poland. Kenya topped the medal standings in the competition with 5 gold, and Ethiopia had the most overall medals with 10. Reports of the event were given in the Herald and for the IAAF.

== Schedule ==
Date	Time (CET)	Events
24 March	12:00	Junior race women
24 March	12:30	Junior race men
24 March	13:15	Senior race women
24 March	14:10	Senior race men

== Medallists ==
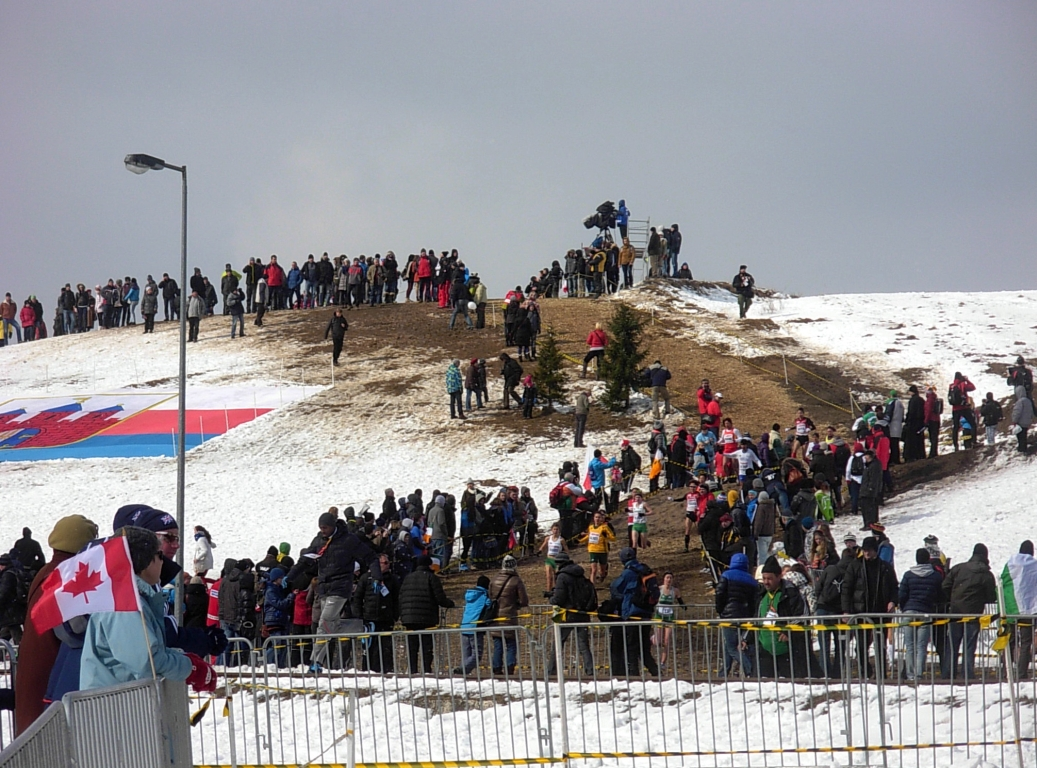
Part of the route

Event	Gold		Silver		Bronze	
Individual
Senior men (12 km)	Japhet Kipyegon Korir; Kenya	32:45	Imane Merga; Ethiopia	32:51	Teklemariam Medhin; Eritrea	32:54
Junior men (8 km)	Hagos Gebrhiwet; Ethiopia	21:04	Leonard Barsoton; Kenya	21:08	Muktar Edris; Ethiopia	21:13
Senior women (8 km)	Emily Chebet; Kenya	24:24	Hiwot Ayalew; Ethiopia	24:27	Belaynesh Oljira; Ethiopia	24:33
Junior women (6 km)	Faith Chepngetich Kipyegon; Kenya	17:51	Agnes Jebet Tirop; Kenya	17:51	Alemitu Heroye; Ethiopia	17:57
Team
Senior men	Ethiopia	38	United States	52	Kenya	54
Junior men	Ethiopia	23	Kenya	26	Morocco	65
Senior women	Kenya	19	Ethiopia	48	Bahrain	73
Junior women	Kenya	14	Ethiopia	23	Great Britain	81

== Results ==
=== Senior men's race (12 km) ===
Official video highlights

Complete results for senior men and for senior men's teams were published.

Individual race
Rank	Athlete	Country	Time (m:s)
Gold medal	Japhet Kipyegon Korir	Kenya	32:45
Silver medal	Imane Merga	Ethiopia	32:51
Bronze medal	Teklemariam Medhin	Eritrea	32:54
4	Moses Ndiema Kipsiro	Uganda	33:08
5	Timothy Toroitich	Uganda	33:09
6	Ben True	United States	33:11
7	Goitom Kifle	Eritrea	33:16
8	Collis Birmingham	Australia	33:18
9	Feyisa Lilesa	Ethiopia	33:22
10	Chris Derrick	United States	33:23
11	Rabah Aboud	Algeria	33:28
12	Hosea Mwok Macharinyang	Kenya	33:29
Full results

- 102 participants from 30 countries participated.

Teams
Rank	Team	Points
Gold medal	Ethiopia: Imane Merga / 2; Feyisa Lilesa / 9; Abera Chane / 13; Tesfaye Abera / 14; (Mosinet Geremew) / (24); (Yigrem Demelash) / (69)	38
Silver medal	United States: Ben True / 6; Chris Derrick / 10; Ryan Vail / 17; Robert Mack / 19; (Elliott Heath) / (30); (James Strang) / (37)	52
Bronze medal	Kenya: Japhet Kipyegon Korir / 1; Hosea Mwok Macharinyang / 12; Geoffrey Kipkorir Kirui / 15; Timothy Kosgei Kiptoo / 26; (Philemon Rono Cherop) / (36); (Jonathan Muia Ndiku) / (DNF)	54
4	Eritrea	75
5	Uganda	76
6	Algeria	107
7	Australia	116
8	Spain	127
Full results

- Note: Athletes in parentheses did not score for the team result.
- 15 teams participated.

=== Senior women's race (8 km) ===
Official video highlights

Complete results for senior women and for senior women's teams were published.

Individual race
Rank	Athlete	Country	Time (m:s)
Gold medal	Emily Chebet	Kenya	24:24
Silver medal	Hiwot Ayalew	Ethiopia	24:27
Bronze medal	Belaynesh Oljira	Ethiopia	24:33
4	Shitaye Eshete	Bahrain	24:34
5	Margaret Wangari Muriuki	Kenya	24:39
6	Janet Kisa	Kenya	24:46
7	Viola Jelagat Kibiwot	Kenya	24:46
8	Tejitu Daba	Bahrain	24:55
9	Juliet Chekwel	Uganda	24:58
10	Irene Chepet Cheptai	Kenya	25:01
11	Beatrice Chepkemoi Mutai	Kenya	25:05
12	Salima El Ouali Alami	Morocco	25:05
Full results

- 97 participants from 29 countries participated.

Teams
Rank	Team	Points
Gold medal	Kenya: Emily Chebet / 1; Margaret Wangari Muriuki / 5; Janet Kisa / 6; Viola Jelagat Kibiwot / 7; (Irene Chepet Cheptai) / (10); (Beatrice Chepkemoi Mutai) / (11)	19
Silver medal	Ethiopia: Hiwot Ayalew / 2; Belaynesh Oljira / 3; Genet Yalew / 15; Sule Utura / 28; (Yebrqual Melese) / (29); (Meselech Melkamu) / (DNF)	48
Bronze medal	Bahrain: Shitaye Eshete / 4; Tejitu Daba / 8; Kareema Jasim / 20; Genzeb Shumi / 41; (Aster Tesfaye) / (52)	73
4	United States	90
5	Ireland	115
6	France	122
7	Great Britain	154
8	Canada	167
Full results

- Note: Athletes in parentheses did not score for the team result.
- 15 teams participated.

=== Junior men's race (8 km) ===
Official video highlights

Complete results for junior men and for junior men's teams were published.

Individual race
Rank	Athlete	Country	Time (m:s)
Gold medal	Hagos Gebrhiwet	Ethiopia	21:04
Silver medal	Leonard Barsoton	Kenya	21:08
Bronze medal	Muktar Edris	Ethiopia	21:13
4	Tsegay Tuemay	Eritrea	21:26
5	Conseslus Kipruto	Kenya	21:40
6	Birhan Nebebew	Ethiopia	21:42
7	Ghirmay Ghebreslassie	Eritrea	21:50
8	Dawit Weldesilasie	Eritrea	21:58
9	Ronald Kwemoi	Kenya	21:58
10	Michael Bett	Kenya	22:21
11	Moses Letoyie	Kenya	22:28
12	Mohammed Abid	Morocco	22:31
Full results

- 113 participants from 27 countries participated.

Teams
Rank	Team	Points
Gold medal	Ethiopia: Hagos Gebrhiwet / 1; Muktar Edris / 3; Birhan Nebebew / 6; Yihunilign Adane / 13; (Bonsa Dida) / (17); (Tsegay Hiluf) / (25)	23
Silver medal	Kenya: Leonard Barsoton / 2; Conseslus Kipruto / 5; Ronald Kwemoi / 9; Michael Bett / 10; (Moses Letoyie) / (11); (Emmanuel Bett Kiprono) / (22)	26
Bronze medal	Morocco: Mohammed Abid / 12; Zouhair Talbi / 14; Omar Ait Chitachen / 18; Hassan Ghachoui / 21; (Jaouad Chemlal) / (23); (Marouane Kahlaoui) / (DNF)	65
4	United States	106
5	Japan	138
6	Italy	164
7	Uganda	170
8	Australia	171
Full results

- Note: Athletes in parentheses did not score for the team result.
- 17 teams participated.

=== Junior women's race (6 km) ===
Official video highlights

Complete results for junior women and for junior women's teams were published.

Individual race
Rank	Athlete	Country	Time (m:s)
Gold medal	Faith Kipyegon	Kenya	17:51
Silver medal	Agnes Jebet Tirop	Kenya	17:51
Bronze medal	Alemitu Heroye	Ethiopia	17:57
4	Caroline Chepkoech Kipkirui	Kenya	18:09
5	Ruti Aga	Ethiopia	18:18
6	Sofiya Shemsu	Ethiopia	18:20
7	Rosefline Chepngetich	Kenya	18:21
8	Sheila Chepngetich Keter	Kenya	18:21
9	Buze Diriba	Ethiopia	18:29
10	Alemitu Hawi	Ethiopia	18:35
11	Pauline Kaveke Kamulu	Kenya	18:43
12	Gotytom Gebreslase	Ethiopia	18:44
Full results

- 87 participants from 21 countries participated.

Teams
Rank	Team	Points
Gold medal	Kenya: Faith Kipyegon / 1; Agnes Jebet Tirop / 2; Caroline Chepkoech Kipkirui / 4; Rosefline Chepngetich / 7; (Sheila Chepngetich Keter) / (8); (Pauline Kaveke Kamulu) / (11)	14
Silver medal	Ethiopia: Alemitu Heroye / 3; Ruti Aga / 5; Sofiya Shemsu / 6; Buze Diriba / 9; (Alemitu Hawi) / (10); (Gotytom Gebreslase) / (12)	23
Bronze medal	Great Britain: Emelia Gorecka / 16; Georgia Taylor-Brown / 17; Amy Eloise Neale / 21; Bobby Clay / 27; (Rebecca Weston) / (33); (Alex Clay) / (35)	81
4	Japan	90
5	Uganda	99
6	United States	105
7	Poland	165
8	Australia	172
Full results

- Note: Athletes in parentheses did not score for the team result.
- 15 teams participated.

== Medal table ==
Rank	Nation	Gold	Silver	Bronze	Total
1	Kenya	5	3	1	9
2	Ethiopia	3	4	3	10
3	United States	0	1	0	1
4	Bahrain	0	0	1	1
4	Eritrea	0	0	1	1
4	Great Britain	0	0	1	1
4	Morocco	0	0	1	1
Totals (7 entries)		8	8	8	24

- Note: Totals include both individual and team medals, with medals in the team competition counting as one medal.

== Participation ==
According to an unofficial count, 398 athletes from 41 countries participated.

- Algeria (18)
- Australia (19)
- Bahrain (6)
- Belarus (1)
- Belgium (2)
- Brazil (17)
- Bulgaria (3)
- Canada (23)
- China (8)
- Czech Republic (1)
- Eritrea (14)
- Ethiopia (24)
- France (12)
- Ireland (5)
- Italy (7)
- Japan (22)
- Kenya (24)
- Kyrgyzstan (2)
- Mexico (4)
- Morocco (11)
- Namibia (2)
- Palestine (1)
- Peru (4)
- Poland (24)
- Portugal (6)
- Puerto Rico (3)
- Romania (1)
- Rwanda (5)
- South Africa (16)
- Spain (18)
- Sudan (4)
- Tanzania (3)
- Thailand (4)
- Tunisia (14)
- Uganda (18)
- United Arab Emirates (1)
- Great Britain (23)
- United States (24)
- Yemen (1)
- Zambia (2)
- Zimbabwe (1)

== See also ==
- 2013 IAAF World Cross Country Championships – Senior men's race
- 2013 IAAF World Cross Country Championships – Junior men's race
- 2013 IAAF World Cross Country Championships – Senior women's race
- 2013 IAAF World Cross Country Championships – Junior women's race
- 2013 in athletics (track and field)
