= Canadian Amateurs =

Canadian Amateurs or variation, may refer to:

== Sports ==
An "Amateur" (type of tournament):

- Canadian Amateur Championship (golf), men's golf tournament
- Canadian Women's Amateur (golf), women's golf tournament
- Canadian Amateur Championship (snooker)

== Other uses ==
- The Canadian Amateur (TCA), amateur radio magazine

== See also ==
- Canada Cup (disambiguation)
- Canadian Open (disambiguation)
- Canadian Masters (disambiguation)
- Canadian Championships (disambiguation)
- Amateur Hockey Association of Canada (1886-1898)
- Canadian Amateur Hockey League (1898-1905)
- Eastern Canada Amateur Hockey Association (1905-1909)
- Canadian Amateur Hockey Association (1914-1994) governing body of amateur ice hockey
- Canadian (disambiguation)
- Amateur (disambiguation)
