= Canadian Championships =

Canadian Championships refers to a number of national-level competition in Canada. It may refer to:

- Canadian Championship, the national championship tournament for professional soccer
- Canadian Figure Skating Championships
- Canadian Professional Figure Skating Championships
- Canadian Gymnastics Championships
- Canadian National Tennis Championship
- Canadian National Badminton Championships
- Canadian National Pond Hockey Championships
- Canadian Mixed Curling Championship
- Canadian Senior Curling Championships
- Canadian Masters Curling Championships
- Canadian Amateur Championship, of golf
- Canadian Tour Championship, of pro-golf
- Canadian Touring Car Championship
- Canadian Rally Championship
- Canadian Superbike Championship
- Canadian Rugby Championship
- Rugby Canada National Junior Championship
- Canadian National Road Race Championships, of cycling
- Canadian National Time Trial Championships, of cycling
- Canadian Synchronized Skating Championships
- Canadian International Heavyweight Championship, of wrestling
- Canadian International Tag Team Championship, of wrestling
- Canadian Ultimate Championships, of frisbee
- Canadian Chess Championship, the closed championship
- Canadian Open Chess Championship
- Canadian National Scrabble Championship
- Mann Cup, the national championship for Senior "A" box lacrosse
- Memorial Cup, the national championship of the Canadian Hockey League

== Athletics Canada Championships ==
- Canadian Track and Field Championships
- Canadian Junior Track and Field Championships
- Legion National Youth Track and Field Championships
- AC Indoor Open
- Canadian Marathon Championships
- Canadian Half Marathon Championships
- Canadian 10Km Road Race Championships
- Canadian 5Km Road Race Championships
- Canadian Cross Country Championships

== See also ==
- Canada Cup (disambiguation)
- Canadian Open (disambiguation)
- Canadian Interuniversity Sport women's ice hockey championship
- Air Canada Championship (1996-2002), golf
- Canadian PGA Championship, of pro golf
- Canadian Collegiate Athletic Association Soccer National Championships
- NWA Canadian Championship (disambiguation), of pro wrestling
