= Amateur (disambiguation) =

An amateur is a person who pursues an activity or field of study independently from their source of income.

Amateurs or The Amateur may also refer to:

== Film ==
- The Amateur (1981 film), a Canadian crime/thriller film
- Amateur (1994 film), a comedy crime drama film written and directed by Hal Hartley
- The Amateur (1999 film), an Argentine drama film
- The Amateurs, an American comedy film
- Amateur (2018 film), an American sports drama
- The Amateur (2025 film), an American espionage action/thriller film

== Literature ==
- The Amateur, a 1916 novel by Charles Gilman Norris
- An Amateur, a 1925 collection by W. B. Maxwell
- "The Amateurs", a 1955 short story by Alan Cogan, first published in the July 1955 issue of Galaxy Science Fiction
- Amateurs, a 1976 collection by Donald Barthelme
- The Amateur, a 1981 novel by Robert Littell, basis for the 1981 and 2025 films
- The Amateurs, a 2009 novel by John Niven
- The Amateurs, a 2016 novel by Sara Shepard
- The Amateur: Barack Obama in the White House, a 2012 book by American author, tabloid writer, and gossip columnist Edward Klein
- Amateur (book), a 2018 non-fiction book by Thomas Page McBee

== Television ==
- "Amateurs", Peanuts episode 25b (2016)
- "The Amateur", Mission: Impossible season 5, episode 9 (1970)
- "The Amateur", NBC Matinee Theater season 1, episode 62 (1956)
- "The Amateurs", GE True episode 13 (1962)
- "The Amateurs", Maigret (1960) series 3, episode 13 (1962)
- "The Amateurs", Motive season 3, episode 11 (2015)
- "The Amateurs", Z-Cars series 7, episode 88 (1972)

== Other uses ==
- Amateur (album), a 2025 album by Molly Nilsson
- The Amateurs (band), an indie rock band
- The Amateur Championship, a golf tournament in the United Kingdom
- Dromore Amateurs F.C., a football club from Northern Ireland, UK

== See also ==
- Professional amateur (disambiguation)
- Armature (disambiguation)
