= Ceili McCabe =

Canadian steeplechaser (born 2001)

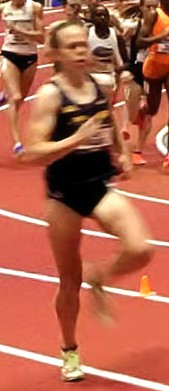
- McCabe at the 2024 NCAA Division I Indoor Track and Field Championships

Personal information
- Born: September 17, 2001 (age 24) Vancouver, British Columbia, Canada
- Education: West Virginia University

Sport
- Country: Canada
- Sport: Track and field
- Event: 3000 metres steeplechase
- University team: West Virginia Mountaineers

Achievements and titles
- Personal bests: 1500 metres: 4:12.57 (Azusa 2024); 3000 metres steeplechase: 9:20.58 NR (Los Angeles 2024); Indoor; 1500 metres: 4:12.78 (New York City 2023); Mile: 4:30.24 (New York City 2024); 3000 metres: 8:50.44 (Boston 2022)

Ceili McCabe (born September 17, 2001) is a Canadian middle- and long-distance runner who specializes in the 3000 metres steeplechase. She has represented her country at the 2022 and 2023 World Athletics Championships and holds the Canadian 3000 metres steeplechase record of 9:20.58, set in 2024.

== Early and personal life ==
McCabe was born September 17, 2001, in Vancouver, British Columbia to Bob and Kate McCabe. She attended Little Flower Academy, where she was a multi-sport athlete all five years of high school.

In 2019, she enrolled at West Virginia University in Morgantown, West Virginia where she majors in Sociology.

== Running career ==
=== High School ===
Competing for Little Flower Academy, under coach Mark Wilkie, McCabe was the 2019 BCSS champion over the 1500 metres steeplechase and finished third in the 800 metres at the same championships. Later that summer, she took first place at both the BC Club Championships in Kamloops and the Canadian U20 Championships in Montreal in the 3000 metres steeplechase. In the latter, she ran a personal best of 10:38.30.

=== West Virginia University ===
==== 2019 ====
In 2019, McCabe enrolled at West Virginia University in order to compete for the Mountaineers cross country and track and field teams. She made her mountaineers debut on September 21, 2019, finishing fifth at the Lock Haven University Invitational. At the Big 12 cross country championships she finished 13th and two weeks later she placed 25th at the Mid-Atlantic Regional.

==== 2020-21 ====
At the postponed 2020 NCAA cross country championships in Stillwater, Oklahoma, Ceili placed 42nd as the top WVU runner.

During the 2021 outdoor season, McCabe qualified for the NCAA Championships in the 3000 m steeplechase after running 6 second personal best at the East Preliminary Round. At nationals, McCabe ran two successive personal bests in the heats and final. 9:39.27 in the heats and a 9:37.39 to take sixth place in the final, just 7.39 seconds off the Olympic qualification standard of 9:30.00. The performances also broke Erin Teschuk's Canadian U23 steeplechase records of 9:40.07.

Being just 7 seconds off the Olympic standard, and a chance at being selected for the 2020 Olympics, McCabe entered another 3000 m steeplechase in Morgantown, West Virginia where she ran a time of 9:32.01, her fourth personal best in a row.

==== 2021-22 ====
Coming off a strong track season, Ceili carried that strength into her cross country season winning her first four races of the season: the Louisville Classic, the Nuttycombe Invitational, the Big 12 Conference Championships, and the NCAA Mid-Atlantic Regional. Unfortunately for McCabe, that win streak snapped at her fifth race of the season, the NCAA Cross Country Championships, where she placed third, just 4 seconds behind winner Whittni Orton.

On December 4, 2021, McCabe ran an indoor 3000 m personal best of 8:52.52 at Boston University, setting a Canadian U23 record in the process.

==== 2022-23 ====
Competing at the 2022 NCAA Indoor Championships in Birmingham, Alabama, McCabe placed 8th in a time of 9:05.09.

Ceili opened her 2022 outdoor season in Morgantown, running 9:32.14 over the steeplechase. At the 2022 NCAA Outdoor Championships in Eugene, Oregon, McCabe improved upon her 2021 finish running a personal best of 9:31.14 to take 3rd in the final. Two weeks later, competing at the Canadian Championships, McCabe won her first senior level national title, running another personal best of 9:30.69 and beating Regan Yee who finished runner-up in a time of 9:31.77. Both personal bests also reset her own Canadian U23 record in the process.

Based on her world ranking, McCabe was selected to represent Canada at the 2022 World Athletics Championships in Eugene, Oregon. McCabe placed tenth in her heat in a time of 9:32.73, missing the finals in her World Championships debut.

At the 2022 NCAA Cross Country Championships in Stillwater, Oklahoma, Ceili placed 24th, earning All-American honours.

On December 3, 2022, McCabe ran an indoor 3000 m personal best of 8:50.44 at Boston University, breaking her own Canadian U23 record in the process.

On January 28, 2023, at the Dr. Sander Invitational in New York City, McCabe competed in the mile running a personal best of 4:31.57, splitting a time of 4:12.78 at 1500 m, also a personal best.

Though she qualified for the 2023 NCAA Indoor Championships in both the mile and 3000 m, McCabe chose to only contest the 3000 m, placing sixth.

==== 2023-24 ====
Competing in the steeplechase during the outdoor season, McCabe won the Big 12 Championships and finished third at the NCAA Championships in Austin. In July, she finished first at the Harry Jerome Track Classic in a personal best of 9:28.76 and finished second to Regan Yee at the Canadian Championships again running a personal best of 9:25.98. Naturally, both performances reset her own Canadian U23 record.

At the 2023 World Athletics Championships in Budapest, McCabe finished sixth in her heat, failing to advance to the finals.\

==== 2023-24 ====
Coming off the World Championships in late August and in preparation for the 2024 Olympics in Paris, Ceili decided to redshirt her cross country season. On 25 November, she competed at the Canadian Cross Country Championships, finishing first in a time of 33:28 in her first ever 10 km cross country race.

On January 27, 2024, McCabe ran a personal best of 4:30.24 over the mile in New York City. At the NCAA Indoor Championships in Boston, McCabe chose to the contest the mile where she finished sixth in personal best of 4:29.26.

On April 17, she ran her season opener in the 3000 metres steeplechase at the USATF LA Grand Prix. She took the win in a personal best and Canadian record of 9:20.58, besting Geneviève Lalonde's former national record of 9:22.40 set at the 2020 Summer Olympics.

== Competition record ==
=== International Competitions ===
Year	Competition	Venue	Position	Event	Time
Representing Canada
2022	World Championships	Hayward Field	26th (h)	3000 m s'chase	9:32.73
2023	World Championships	National Athletics Centre	19th (h)	3000 m s'chase	9:29.30
2024	Olympic Games	Paris, France	18th (h)	3000 m s'chase	9:20.71

=== National Championships ===
Year	Competition	Venue	Position	Event	Time
2018	Legion National Youth Track and Field Championships	Brandon, Manitoba	6th	800 m	2:19.03
2018	Canadian Cross Country Championships	Fort Henry National Historic Site	3rd	4 km (U18)	14:21
2019	Canadian U20 Championships	Montreal, Quebec	7th	800 m	2:10.70
2019	Canadian U20 Championships	Montreal, Quebec	1st	3000 m s'chase	10:38.30
2022	Canadian Track and Field Championships	Langley, British Columbia	1st	3000 m s'chase	9:30.69
2023	Canadian Track and Field Championships	Langley, British Columbia	2nd	3000 m s'chase	9:25.98
2023	Canadian Cross Country Championships	Mooney's Bay Park	1st	10 km	33:28

=== NCAA Championships ===
Year	Competition	Venue	Position	Event	Time
Representing the West Virginia Mountaineers
2021	NCAA Cross Country Championships	Jacksonville, Florida	42nd	6 km	21:01.2
2021	NCAA Outdoor Track and Field Championships	Hayward Field	6th	3000 metres s'chase	9:37.39
2021	NCAA Cross Country Championships	Stillwater, Oklahoma	3rd	6 km	19:29.5
2022	NCAA Indoor Track and Field Championships	Birmingham, Alabama	8th	3000 m	9:05.09
2022	NCAA Outdoor Track and Field Championships	Hayward Field	3rd	3000 metres s'chase	9:31.14
2022	NCAA Cross Country Championships	Stillwater, Oklahoma	24th	6 km	20:03.2
2023	NCAA Indoor Track and Field Championships	Albuquerque Convention Center	6th	3000 m	9:16.03
2023	NCAA Outdoor Track and Field Championships	Mike A. Myers Stadium	3rd	3000 metres s'chase	9:41.32
2024	NCAA Indoor Track and Field Championships	The Track at New Balance	6th	Mile	4:29.26
