= Kieran Lumb =

Canadian middle- and long-distance runner (born 1998)

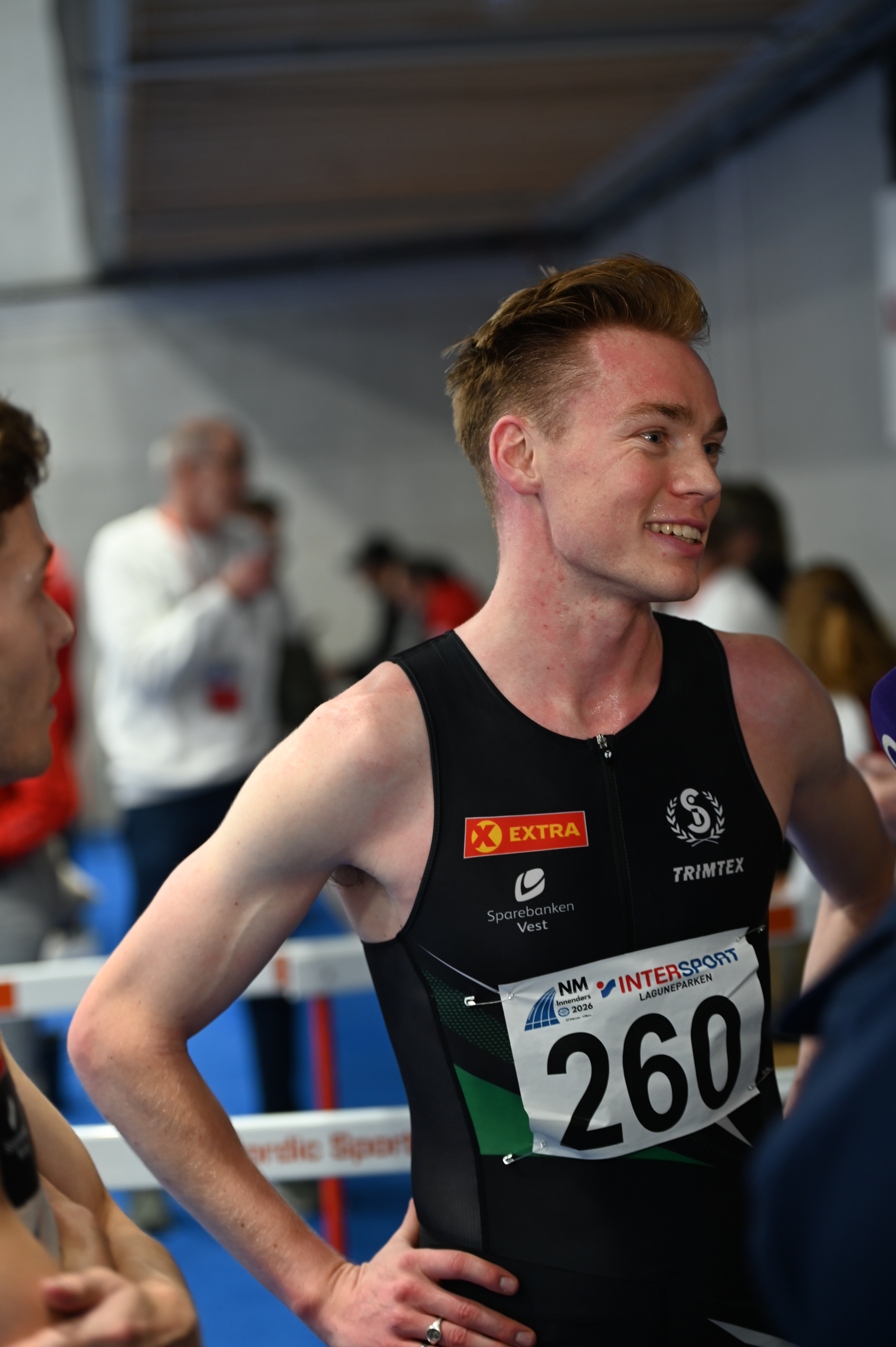
- Lumb in 2026

Personal information
- Nationality: Canadian
- Born: August 2, 1998 (age 28) Vancouver, Canada
- Height: 5 ft 11 in (180 cm)
- Weight: 144 lb (65 kg)

Sport
- University team: Washington Huskies (2021-2023); UBC Thunderbirds (2016-2020)
- Turned pro: 2023

Achievements and titles
- Personal bests: Outdoor; 1500 m: 3:34.55 (Padua 2023); 3000 m: 7:36.46 NR (Zagreb 2023); 5000 m: 13:23.26 (Azusa 2023); 10,000 m: 28:11.49 (Eugene 2022); Indoor; 1500 m: 3:36.81 (Boston 2023); Mile: 3:52.62 (Boston 2023); 3000 m: 7:38.39 NR (Boston 2023); Two miles: 8:14.52 (New York City 2024); 5000 m: 13:16.59 (Boston 2024); Road; Mile: 3:56.98 NR (Riga 2023); 5 km: 14:13 (Vancouver 2019)
Medal record
Men's track and field
Representing Canada
NACAC Championships
Bronze medal – third place	2022 Nassau	5000 m

Kieran Lumb (born August 2, 1998) is a Canadian middle- and long-distance runner. He competed collegiately for the UBC Thunderbirds (2016-2020) and the Washington Huskies (2021-2023) before turning professional in April 2023. He holds the Canadian record in the indoor and outdoor 3000 m, having set both records in 2023.

== Collegiate career ==
=== UBC Thunderbirds (2016–2020) ===
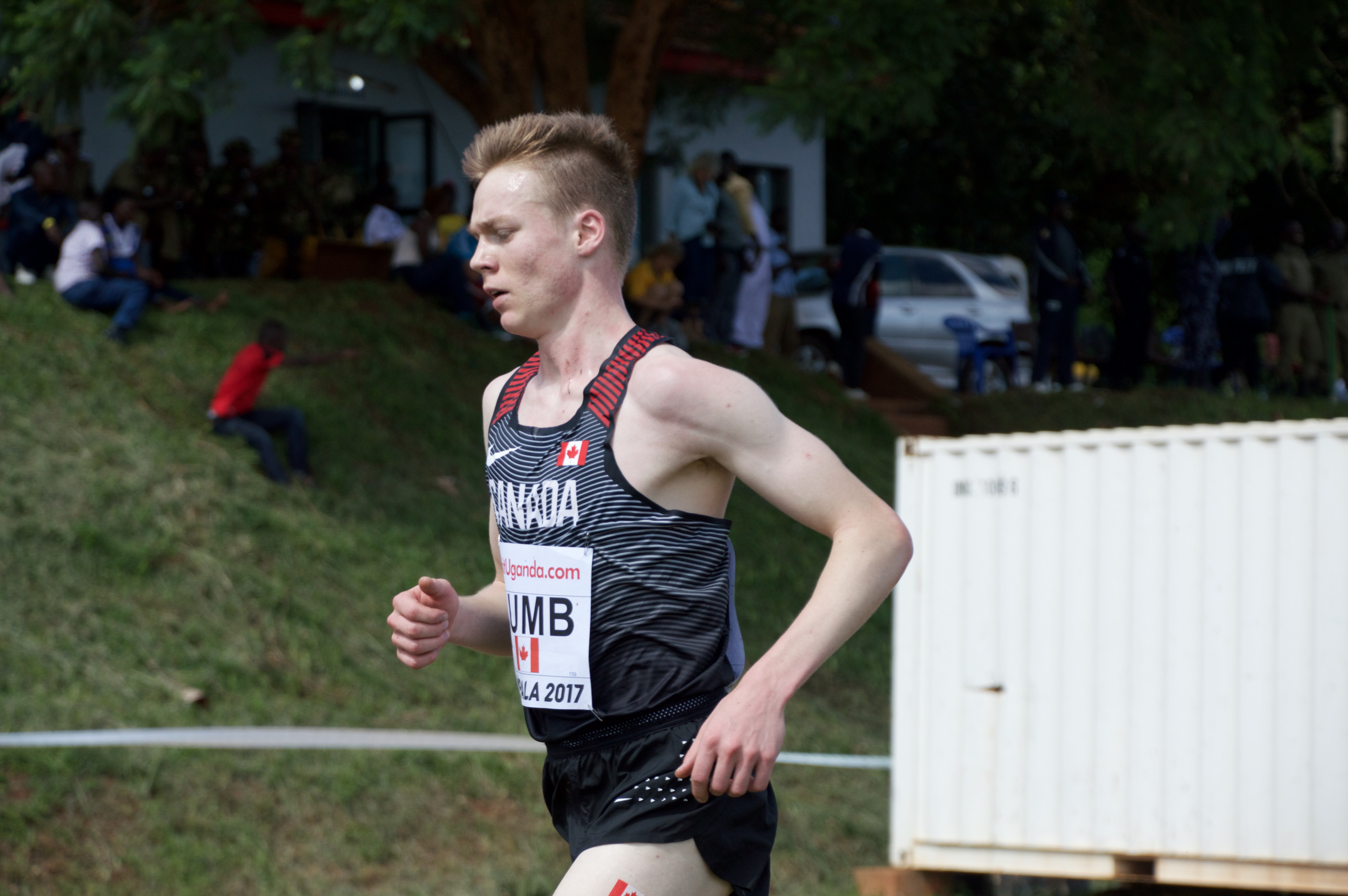
Lumb, Kampala, 2017

Lumb enrolled at the University of British Columbia in 2016 where he would compete for the Thunderbirds cross country and track and field teams.

In his first collegiate track season, he placed fourth at the 2017 NAIA Championships, competing in the 5000 m.

The next fall, Lumb placed third at the NAIA Cross Country Championships in Vancouver, Washington.

At the 2018 NAIA Track and Field Championships, he placed seventh in the 1500 m and third in the 5000 m. In 2019, he had his best showing at the NAIA Championships yet, winning the 5000 m title and finishing third over 1500 m.

In April 2021, he ran a personal best of 13:24.25 over 5000 m, a second place finish at the Drake Relays. In July, he made his first Diamond League appearance at the Bislett Games in Oslo, running 7:46.28 over 3000 m.

=== Washington Huskies (2021–2023) ===
In 2021, Lumb transferred to the University of Washington.

In fall 2021, he placed tenth at the Pac-12 cross country Championships and won the West Regional before placing 87th at the national championship.

In May 2022, he placed second in the 10,000 m at the Pac-12 Track and Field Championships just 0.32 seconds behind Stanford's Charles Hicks. In the process, he ran a 28:11.49 personal best, a University of Washington school record.

In February 2023, Lumb was also a part of a group of eight University of Washington teammates that ran a sub-4 minute mile in the same race. Shortly after, Lumb ran the second fastest indoor mile time in Canadian history, running 3:52.62 in Boston. That same year he was a part of the NCAA's second fastest DMR team of all time.

At the 2023 NCAA Indoor Championships, Lumb finished eighth in the 3000 m and anchored Washington to a fourth place finish in the DMR.

== Professional career ==
On April 21, 2023, Lumb announced he had signed a pro contract with On Running.

In July 2023, at the Canadian Track and Field Championships, he won the 1500m in 3:37.34, setting a new meet record. The next month he competed at the World Championships in Budapest in the 1500 m, where he finished eighth in his heat, failing to advance to the semi-finals.

On 4 September, Lumb ran a 1500 m personal best of 3:34.55 in Padua, Italy. On 6 September, he broke Mo Ahmed's 3000 m Canadian record, running 7:38.92 in Rovereto, Italy. Just four days later, in Zagreb, he improved upon that time, running 7:36.46.

On 1 October, he competed in the road mile at the inaugural World Road Running Championships in Riga finishing fifth in a Canadian record of 3:56.98.

On 25 November, Lumb took first place at the Canadian Cross Country Championships in Ottawa. The following week he set the Canadian indoor 3000 m record, running 7:38.39 in Boston.

At the 2024 World Athletics Indoor Championships, Lumb competed in the 1500 m, where he would qualify for the final, placing 13th.

== Personal life ==
Lumb attended Lord Byng Secondary in Vancouver, British Columbia. His father went to the University of Utah and competed in cross country skiing while he was there. Lumb took after his father, placing 10th overall in the Junior Men's 8 km cross country ski race at the 2016 Canadian Cross Country Championships.

== Achievements ==
Taken from World Athletics and TFRRS profile.

NAIA Championships

Representing the UBC Thunderbirds
Year	Meet	Venue	Event	Place	Time	Notes
2016	NAIA Cross Country Championships	Elsah, IL	8 km	26th	25:10	
2017	NAIA Outdoor Championships	Gulf Shores, AL	5000m	4th	14:56.16	
2017	NAIA Cross Country Championships	Vancouver, WA	8 km	3rd	24:26	
2018	NAIA Outdoor Championships	Gulf Shores, AL	1500m	7th	3:50.27	
2018	NAIA Outdoor Championships	Gulf Shores, AL	5000m	3rd	14:42.50	
2019	NAIA Outdoor Championships	Gulf Shores, AL	1500m	3rd	3:54.52	
2019	NAIA Outdoor Championships	Gulf Shores, AL	5000m	1st	14:29.94	

=== U SPORTS championships ===
Representing the UBC Thunderbirds
Year	Meet	Venue	Event	Place	Time	Notes
2019	U SPORTS Cross Country Championships	Kingston, Ontario	10 km	1st	30:42	

=== NCAA championships ===
Representing the Washington Huskies
Year	Meet	Venue	Event	Place	Time	Notes
2021	NCAA Cross Country Championships	Apalachee Regional Park	10 km	87th	30:05	
2022	NCAA Outdoor Championships	Hayward Field	10,000m	17th	28:36.31	
2023	NCAA Indoor Championships	Albuquerque Convention Center	3000m	8th	8:02.63	
2023	NCAA Indoor Championships	Albuquerque Convention Center	DMR	4th	9:31.97	

=== Canadian championships ===
Year	Meet	Venue	Event	Place	Time	Notes
2016	Canadian Cross Country Championships	Kingston, Ontario	8 km	10th	25:14	U20 race
2017	Canadian U20 Outdoor Championships	Terry Fox Stadium	1500m	4th	3:54.57	
2017	Canadian U20 Outdoor Championships	Terry Fox Stadium	5000m	3rd	15:03.98	
2018	Canadian Outdoor Championships	Terry Fox Stadium	5000m	11th	14:55.31	
2018	Canadian Outdoor Championships	Terry Fox Stadium	1500m	11th (sf)	3:55.11	
2019	Canadian Outdoor Championships	Complex Sportif Claude-Robillard	1500m	5th	3:50.24	
2019	Canadian Outdoor Championships	Complex Sportif Claude-Robillard	5000m	5th	14:06.67	
2022	Canadian Outdoor Championships	McLeod Stadium	1500m	3rd	3:57.31	
2023	Canadian Track and Field Championships	Langley, British Columbia	1500m	1st	3:37.24	Championship record
2023	Canadian Cross Country Championships	Ottawa, Ontario	10 km	1st	29:18	
2024	Canadian Track and Field Championships	Complexe sportif Claude-Robillard	1500m	1st	3:45.10	

=== International competitions ===
Representing Canada
Year	Meet	Venue	Event	Place	Time	Notes
2017	IAAF World Cross Country Championships	Kampala, Uganda	8 km	55th	26:21	U20 race
2017	Pan American U20 Championships	Trujillo, Peru	5000m	6th	14:59.88	
2019	FISU World University Games	Naples, Italy	5000m	4th	14:06.08	
2022	NACAC Championships	Freeport, Bahamas	1500m	OC	3:43.73	
2022	NACAC Championships	Freeport, Bahamas	5000m	3rd	14:50.06	
2023	World Athletics Championships	Budapest, Hungary	1500m	H3 8th	3:36.66	
2023	World Athletics Road Running Championships	Riga, Latvia	Mile	5th	3:56.98	NR
2024	World Athletics Indoor Championships	Glasgow, United Kingdom	1500m	13th	3:41.37	

Personal bests

Surface	Event	Time	Date	Venue	Notes
Indoor track	One Mile	3:52.39	Feb 26, 2023	Boston University	NR
Indoor track	3000m	7:38.39	Dec 2, 2023	Boston University	NR
Indoor track	Two Miles	8:14.52	Feb 11, 2024	The Armory	
Indoor track	5000m	13:16.59	Jan 26, 2022	Boston University	
Outdoor track	1500m	3:34.25	June 8, 2025	Renton, Washington	
Outdoor track	3000m	7:36.46	Sep 10, 2023	Zagreb, Croatia	NR
Outdoor track	5000m	13:23.26	April 14, 2022	Azusa, CA	
Outdoor track	10,000m	28:11.49	May 13, 2022	Hayward Field	
Road	Mile	3:56.98	Oct 1, 2023	Riga, Latvia	NR
Road	5 km	13:36	Dec 31, 2025	B100 Cursa dels Nassos, Barcelona, Spain	
Road	10 km	27:50	Jan 11, 2026	10K Valencia Valencia, Spain	NR
