= Canada Cup 1993 =

Canada Cup 1993 or 1993 Canada Cup may refer to:

- Canada Cup 1993 (rugby), international women's rugby union tournament
- 1993 Canada Cup International Softball Championship

== See also ==
- 1993 in Canada
- 1993 in sport
- Canada Cup (disambiguation)
