= Canadian Open =

Canada Open or Canadian Open may refer to:

- Canadian Open (golf), the Canadian Open of golf
- Canadian Women's Open, a women's professional golf tournament managed by the Royal Canadian Golf Association
- Canadian Open (tennis), the Canadian Open of tennis
- Canadian Open (curling), the Canadian Open of curling
- Canadian Open (badminton), the Canadian Open of badminton
- Canadian Open (darts), a darts tournament that has been held annually since 1985
- Canadian Open Chess Championship, the Canadian Open of chess
- Canadian Open Mathematics Challenge, the Canadian Open of math
- Joslin's Canadian Open, the Canadian Open of grappling
- NWA Canadian Open Tag Team Championship, the Canadian Open of pro-wrestling on the NWA tour
- Canadian Open Snooker Championship, the amateur Canadian snooker tournament
- Canadian Open (snooker), the Canadian Open of snooker

== See also ==
- Open Canada Cup, a soccer championship
- Canada Cup (disambiguation)
- Canadian Championships (disambiguation)
