= Professional (disambiguation) =

A professional is someone who is skilled in a profession.

Professional or professionals may also refer to:

== Music ==
- The Professionals (band), a British punk rock band formed in 1979
- The Professionals (The Professionals album), a 1980 album by hard rock band The Professionals
- The Professionals (Madlib and Oh No album)
- The Professional (album), a 1998 DJ Clue album
- The Professional 2, a 2000 DJ Clue album
- "The Professional" (1988 song), a song by DJ Clue from his 1998 album The Professional
- "The Professional" (2000 song), a song by Sleater-Kinney from their 2000 album All Hands on the Bad One
- "Professional" (2013 song), a song by The Weeknd from his 2013 album Kiss Land

== Film ==
- The Professionals (1960 film), a British crime thriller film
- The Professionals (1966 film), an American western film
- The Professional (1981 film), a French action film
- The Professional (2003 film), a Serbian comedy/drama film
- Léon: The Professional, a 1994 French thriller film

== Literature ==
- The Professionals, a 1973 novel by John Harris
- The Professional (novel), 2009 novel by Robert B. Parker
- The Professionals, a 2012 novel by Owen Laukkanen
- The Professional, a 2014 novel by Kresley Cole

== Television ==
=== Episodes ===
- "Professional", The Knight in the Area episode 26 (2012)
- "Professional", Wangan Midnight episode 12 (2007)
- "Professionals", Casualty series 1, episode 7 (1986)
- "The Professional", Arctic Air season 1, episode 8 (2012)
- "The Professional", Cluff series 2, episode 5 (1965)
- "The Professional", Joe 90 episode 20 (1969)
- "The Professional", Kaamelott season 3, episode 23 (2006)
- "The Professional", Medical Center season 1, episode 21 (1970)
- "The Professional", Night Heat season 4, episode 20 (1988)
- "The Professional", Tarzan (1966) season 2, episode 14 (1968)
- "The Professional", The Main Chance series 1, episode 3 (1969)
- "The Professionals", Baki the Grappler season 2, episode 6 (2001)
- "The Professionals", Contrabandits series 2, episode 5 (1968)
- "The Professionals", Danger Man series 2, episode 2 (1964)
- "The Professionals", For Your Love season 5, episode 16 (2002)
- "The Professionals", Hero: 108 season 2, episode 25a (2012)
- "The Professionals", Holby City series 12, episode 4 (2009)
- "The Professionals", I Want My Phone Back season 1, episode 7 (2016)
- "The Professionals", Ironside season 5, episode 4 (1971)
- "The Professionals", Prodigal Son season 1, episode 19 (2020)
- "The Professionals", The Chris Isaak Show season 1, episode 11 (2001)

=== Shows ===
- The Professionals (TV series), a British crime-action television drama series
- Professionals (TV series), a South African-Irish action television series

== Other uses ==
- The Professionals, Japanese documentary series dubbed in English for NHK World-Japan, known in Japan as プロフェッショナル_仕事の流儀 (Professional Shigoto no Ryūgi)
- Professionals Australia, employee association and trade union

== See also ==
- Professional sports
- Professional amateur (disambiguation)
- Pro (disambiguation)
