= Professional amateur =

Professional amateur may refer to:

- Pro–am (professional–amateur), a level of play between amateur and professional in sports
- Amateur professionalism, a socio-economic concept of amateur output of professional quality

== See also ==
- Professional (disambiguation)
- Amateur (disambiguation)
