= Canada Cup (disambiguation) =

The Canada Cup was an invitational international men's ice hockey tournament (1976–1991)

Canada Cup may also refer to:

- Canada Cup (curling), a national tournament for men's and women's curling
- Canada Cup (fighting game event), an international video game tournament
- Canada Cup (floorball), an international floorball tournament
- Canada Cup (rugby), a former international women's rugby union tournament
- Canada Cup (soccer), an international invitational tournament
- Canadian Cup of Soccer, a national professional tournament
- Canada Cup International Softball Championship, an international women's softball tournament
- Canada Cup, a former name of the international golf tournament World Cup (men's golf)
- Open Canada Cup, a former national amateur and professional men's soccer tournament
- Canada's Cup, a trophy awarded for match race yachting between Canadian and American clubs

== See also ==
- Canadian Open (disambiguation)
- Canadian Championships (disambiguation)
- Air Canada Cup (1979-2003), midget hockey trophy
- Canadian National Challenge Cup, soccer
- FEI Nations Cup of Canada for equestrian
- Kanada-malja, translates to Canada Cup in Finnish, serves as the championship trophy for Liiga
- Western Canada Cup, Junior A hockey trophy
