= Armature =

Armature may refer to:

- Armature (computer animation), kinematic chain used in computer animation to simulate the motions of virtual characters
- Armature (electrical), one of the two principal electrical components of an electromechanical machine
- Armature (sculpture), framework around which a sculpture is built
- Armature Studio, video game developer
