= Canadian Masters =

Canadian Masters may refer to any of the following sporting events:

- Canadian Masters (golf), a golf tournament that was an event on the Canadian Tour between 1994 and 1999
- Canadian Masters (snooker), a snooker tournament that was held between 1985 and 1989
- Canadian Open (tennis), a tennis tournament also known as the Canada Masters
