= FEI Nations Cup of Canada =

FEI Nations Cup of Canada may refer to:

- 2010 FEI Nations Cup of Canada
- 2011 FEI Nations Cup of Canada
