= NWA Canadian Championship =

NWA Canadian Championship of pro-wrestling may refer to:

- NWA Canadian Television Championship
- NWA Canadian Women's Championship
- NWA Canadian Tag Team Championship
- NWA Canadian Tag Team Championship (Vancouver version)
- NWA Canadian Open Tag Team Championship
- NWA Canadian Heavyweight Championship (Calgary version)
- NWA Canadian Heavyweight Championship (Halifax version)
