= Donald Barthelme bibliography =

This is a bibliography of works by Donald Barthelme.

== Books ==
=== Novels ===
Title	Publisher	Notes
Snow White	Atheneum (1967)	first published in The New Yorker on February 18, 1967
The Dead Father	Farrar, Straus (1975)	incorporates the short story "A Manual for Sons"
Paradise	Putnam (1986)	
The King	Harper (1990)	

=== Collections ===
Title	Publisher	Notes
Come Back, Dr. Caligari	Little, Brown (1964)	
Unspeakable Practices, Unnatural Acts	Farrar, Straus (1968)	
Guilty Pleasures	Farrar, Straus (1968)	Non-fiction
City Life	Farrar, Straus (1970)	
Sadness	Farrar, Straus (1972)	
Amateurs	Farrar, Straus (1976)	
Great Days	Farrar, Straus (1979)	
Sixty Stories	Putnam (1981)	
Overnight to Many Distant Cities	Putnam (1983)	
Sam's Bar	Doubleday (1987)	With illustrations by Seymour Chwast
Forty Stories	Putnam (1987)	
The Teachings of Don B.	Turtle Bay Books (1992)	Satires, parodies, Fables, illustrated stories, and plays
Not-Knowing	Random House (1997)	Essays and interviews
Flying to America	Shoemaker & Hoard (2008)	
Collected Stories	Library of America (2021)	Collects seven complete books: Come Back, Dr. Caligari; Unspeakable Practices, Unnatural Acts; City Life; Sadness; Amateurs; Great Days; Overnight to Many Distant Cities; selections from Sixty Stories and Forty Stories, and 4 uncollected stories

=== Children's books ===
Title	Publisher
The Slightly Irregular Fire Engine, or the Hithering Thithering Djinn	Farrar, Straus (1971)

== Short works ==
Includes short stories, satires, parodies, fables, and illustrated stories, arranged by first date of publication.

=== 1959–1969 ===
Title	Originally published in	Collected in:
Pages from the Annual Report	Forum, Spring 1959 (as David Reiner)	Flying to America (2008) McSweeney's Issue 24 (2007)
Me and Miss Mandible	Contact 7, February 1961 (under the title "The Darling Little Duckling At School")	Come Back, Dr. Caligari (1964); Sixty Stories (1981)
Hiding Man	First Person 1, spring/summer 1961	Come Back, Dr. Caligari (1964); Flying to America (2008)
The Big Broadcast of 1938	New World Writing 20, 1962	Come Back, Dr. Caligari (1964); Flying to America (2008)
The Viennese Opera Ball	Contact 10, June 1962	Come Back, Dr. Caligari (1964); Flying to America (2008)
L'Lapse	The New Yorker, March 2, 1963	Guilty Pleasures (1974); The Teachings of Don B. (1992)
Florence Green is 81	Harper's Bazaar, April 1963	Come Back, Dr. Caligari (1964); Flying to America (2008)
The Piano Player	The New Yorker, August 31, 1963	Come Back, Dr. Caligari (1964); Flying to America (2008)
Marie, Marie, Hold on Tight	The New Yorker, October 12, 1963	Come Back, Dr. Caligari (1964); Flying to America (2008)
To London and Rome	Genesis West 2, Fall 1963	Come Back, Dr. Caligari (1964); Flying to America (2008)
A Shower of Gold	The New Yorker, December 28, 1963	Come Back, Dr. Caligari (1964); Sixty Stories (1981)
Margins	The New Yorker, February 22, 1964	Come Back, Dr. Caligari (1964); Sixty Stories (1981)
Down the Line with the Annual	The New Yorker, March 21, 1964	Guilty Pleasures (1974); The Teachings of Don B. (1992)
Man's Face	The New Yorker, May 30, 1964	The Teachings of Don B. (1992)
A Picture History of the War	The New Yorker, June 20, 1964	Unspeakable Practices, Unnatural Acts (1968); Flying to America (2008)
The Police Band	The New Yorker, August 22, 1964	Unspeakable Practices, Unnatural Acts (1968); Flying to America (2008)
For I'm the Boy		Come Back, Dr. Caligari (1964); Sixty Stories (1981)
Will you Tell me?	Arts and Literature	Come Back, Dr. Caligari (1964); Sixty Stories (1981)
The Joker's Greatest Triumph	Come Back, Dr. Caligari (1964)	The Teachings of Don B. (1992)
Up, Aloft in the Air	Come Back, Dr. Caligari (1964)	Flying to America (2008)
The President	The New Yorker, September 5, 1964	Unspeakable Practices, Unnatural Acts (1968); Sixty Stories (1981)
Game	The New Yorker, July 31, 1965	Unspeakable Practices, Unnatural Acts (1968); Sixty Stories (1981)
Can We Talk	Art and Literature 5, Summer 1965	Unspeakable Practices, Unnatural Acts (1968); Flying to America (2008)
Snap Snap	The New Yorker, August 28, 1965	Guilty Pleasures (1974); The Teachings of Don B. (1992)
Edward and Pia	The New Yorker, September 25, 1965	Unspeakable Practices, Unnatural Acts (1968); Flying to America (2008)
This Newspaper Here	The New Yorker, February 12, 1966	Unspeakable Practices, Unnatural Acts (1968); Flying to America (2008)
See the Moon?	The New Yorker, March 12, 1966	Unspeakable Practices, Unnatural Acts (1968); Sixty Stories (1981)
Several Garlic Tales	The Paris Review, No. 37, Spring 1966	
The Balloon	The New Yorker, April 16, 1966	Unspeakable Practices, Unnatural Acts (1968); Sixty Stories (1981)
Games are the Enemies of Beauty, Truth, and Sleep, Amanda Said	Mademoiselle, November 1966	Guilty Pleasures (1974); The Teachings of Don B. (1992)
The Dolt	The New Yorker, November 11, 1967	Unspeakable Practices, Unnatural Acts (1968); Sixty Stories (1981)
Alice		Unspeakable Practices, Unnatural Acts (1968); Sixty Stories (1981)
Robert Kennedy Saved from Drowning		Unspeakable Practices, Unnatural Acts (1968); Sixty Stories (1981)
Report		Unspeakable Practices, Unnatural Acts (1968); Sixty Stories (1981)
The Indian Uprising		Unspeakable Practices, Unnatural Acts (1968); Sixty Stories (1981); The Norton Anthology of Contemporary Fiction (1998)
A Few Moments of Sleeping and Waking		Unspeakable Practices, Unnatural Acts (1968); Forty Stories (1987)
And Now Let's Hear it for The Ed Sullivan Show!	Esquire, April 1969	Guilty Pleasures (1974); The Teachings of Don B. (1992)
Bone Bubbles	The Paris Review 48, 1969	City Life (1970); Flying to America (2008)
Paraguay	The New Yorker, September 6, 1969	City Life (1970); Sixty Stories (1981)

=== 1970–1974 ===
Title	Originally published in	Collected in:
Brain Damage	The New Yorker, February 21, 1970	City Life (1970); The Teachings of Don B. (1992)
Sentence	The New Yorker, March 7, 1970	City Life (1970); Forty Stories (1987)
A Nation of Wheels	The New Yorker, June 13, 1970	Guilty Pleasures (1974); The Teachings of Don B. (1992)
Many Have Remarked...	"Notes and Comments," The New Yorker, June 13, 1970	The Teachings of Don B. (1992)
Newsletter	The New Yorker, July 11, 1970	The Teachings of Don B. (1992)
Views of My Father Weeping		City Life (1970); Sixty Stories (1981)
On Angels		City Life (1970); Sixty Stories (1981)
The Phantom of the Opera's Friend		City Life (1970); Sixty Stories (1981)
City Life		City Life (1970); Sixty Stories (1981)
Kierkegaard Unfair to Schlegel		City Life (1970); Sixty Stories (1981)
The Falling Dog		City Life (1970); Sixty Stories (1981)
The Policeman's Ball		City Life (1970); Sixty Stories (1981)
The Glass Mountain		City Life (1970); Sixty Stories (1981)
At the Tolstoy Museum		City Life (1970); Forty Stories (1987)
The Explanation		City Life (1970); Forty Stories (1987)
Adventure	Harper's Bazaar, December 1970	The Teachings of Don B. (1992)
The Rise of Capitalism	The New Yorker, December 12, 1970	Sadness (1972); Sixty Stories (1981)
The Death of Edward Lear	The New Yorker, January 2, 1971	Great Days (1979); Sixty Stories (1981)
The Story Thus Far:	The New Yorker, May 1, 1971	The Teachings of Don B. (1992)
Critique de la Vie Quotidienne	The New Yorker, July 17, 1971	Sadness (1972); Sixty Stories (1981)
Natural History	Harper's, August 1971	The Teachings of Don B. (1992)
The Mothball Fleet	The New Yorker, September 11, 1971	Overnight to Many Distant Cities (1983); Flying to America (2008)
Two Hours to Curtain	part of "Flying to America,"; The New Yorker, December 4, 1971	Guilty Pleasures (1974); The Teachings of Don B. (1992)
The Dragon	"Notes and Comments,"; The New Yorker, February 26, 1972	Guilty Pleasures (1974); The Teachings of Don B. (1992)
The Sandman	The Atlantic	Sadness (1972); Sixty Stories (1981)
Träumerei		Sadness (1972); Sixty Stories (1981)
A City of Churches	The New Yorker	Sadness (1972); Sixty Stories (1981)
Daumier	The New Yorker	Sadness (1972); Sixty Stories (1981)
The Party	The New Yorker	Sadness (1972); Sixty Stories (1981)
The Genius	The New Yorker, February 20, 1971	Sadness (1972); Forty Stories (1987)
Engineer-Private Paul Klee Misplaces an Aircraft Between Milbertshofen and Cambrai, March 1916	The New Yorker	Sadness (1972); Forty Stories (1987)
Departures	The New Yorker	Sadness (1972); Forty Stories (1987)
The Catechist	The New Yorker	Sadness (1972); Forty Stories (1987)
The Flight of Pigeons from the Palace	The New Yorker	Sadness (1972); Forty Stories (1987)
The Temptation of St. Anthony	The New Yorker	Sadness (1972); Forty Stories (1987)
A Film	The New Yorker	Sadness (1972); Forty Stories (1987)
Perpetua	The New Yorker	Sadness (1972); Flying to America (2008)
Subpoena	The New Yorker	Sadness (1972); Flying to America (2008)
Wrack	The New Yorker, October 21, 1972	Overnight to Many Distant Cities (1983); Flying to America (2008)
Swallowing	The New York Times, November 4, 1972	Guilty Pleasures (1974); The Teachings of Don B. (1992)
The Sea of Hesitation	The New Yorker, November 11, 1972	Overnight to Many Distant Cities (1983); Flying to America (2008)
A Man	The New Yorker, December 30, 1972	Flying to America (2008)
The Inauguration	Harper's, January 1973	The Teachings of Don B. (1992)
The Young Visitirs	"Notes and Comments,"; The New Yorker, February 10, 1973	Guilty Pleasures (1974); The Teachings of Don B. (1992)
The Teachings of Don B.: A Yankee Way of Knowledge	The New York Times Magazine, February 11, 1973	Guilty Pleasures (1974); The Teachings of Don B. (1992)
Our Work and Why We Do It	The New Yorker, May 5, 1973	Amateurs (1976); Sixty Stories (1981)
The Educational Experience	Harper's, June 1973	Amateurs(1976), Forty Stories (1974); The Teachings of Don B. (1992)
That Cosmopolitan Girl	The New Yorker, July 16, 1973	Guilty Pleasures (1974); The Teachings of Don B. (1992)
An Hesitation on the Bank of the Delaware	The New Yorker, September 3, 1973	Guilty Pleasures (1974); The Teachings of Don B. (1992)
The Angry Young Man	Fiction, Vol. 2, No. 2, 1973	Guilty Pleasures (1974); The Teachings of Don B. (1992)
The Bed	Viva, No. 1 October 1973	Flying to America (2008) McSweeney's Issue 24 (2007)
The Royal Treatment	The New York Times, November 3, 1973	Guilty Pleasures (1974); The Teachings of Don B. (1992)
The Palace	"Notes and Comments," The New Yorker, December 24, 1973	The Teachings of Don B. (1992)
The Photographs	The New Yorker, January 28, 1974	Guilty Pleasures (1974); The Teachings of Don B. (1992)
Heliotrope	"Notes and Comments," The New Yorker, April 1, 1974	The Teachings of Don B. (1992)
Mr. Foolfarm's Journal	The Village Voice, May 16, 1974	Guilty Pleasures (1974); The Teachings of Don B. (1992)
Letters to the Editore		Guilty Pleasures (1974); Forty Stories (1987)
The New Member	The New Yorker, July 15, 1974	Amateurs (1976); Flying to America (2008)
Eugénie Grandet		Guilty Pleasures (1974); Sixty Stories (1981)
Bunny Image, Loss of: The Case of Bitsy S.	Guilty Pleasures (1974)	The Teachings of Don B. (1992)
Nothing: A Preliminary Account		Guilty Pleasures (1974); Sixty Stories (1981)
I Bought a Little City	The New Yorker, November 11, 1974	Amateurs (1976); Sixty Stories (1981)
I Was Gratified This Week...	"Notes and Comments," The New Yorker, November 18, 1974	The Teachings of Don B. (1992)

=== 1975–1979 ===
Title	Originally published in	Collected in:
A Manual for Sons		The Dead Father (1975); Sixty Stories (1981)
The Dassaud Prize	The New Yorker, January 12, 1976	The Teachings of Don B. (1992)
Monumental Folly	The Atlantic, February 1976	The Teachings of Don B. (1992)
Cornell	Joseph Cornell Exhibition Catalogue, February–March 1976; Ontario Review 5, Fall/Winter 1976	Interchapter in Overnight to Many Distant Cities (1983); The Teachings of Don B. (1992)
The Great Debate	The New Yorker, May 3, 1976	The Teachings of Don B. (1992)
At the End of the Mechanical Age		Amateurs (1976); Sixty Stories (1981)
Rebecca		Amateurs (1976); Sixty Stories (1981)
The Captured Woman		Amateurs (1976); Sixty Stories (1981)
The Sergeant	Fiction, Vol. 3, Nos. 2+3, 1975	Amateurs (1976); Sixty Stories (1981)
The School		Amateurs (1976); Sixty Stories (1981)
The Great Hug		Amateurs (1976); Sixty Stories (1981)
Some of Us Had Been Threatening; Our Friend Colby	The New Yorker, May 26, 1973	Amateurs (1976); Forty Stories (1987)
Porcupines at the University		Amateurs (1976); Forty Stories (1987)
The Wound		Amateurs (1976); Forty Stories (1987)
110 West Sixty-First Street		Amateurs (1976); Forty Stories (1987)
The Agreement		Amateurs (1976); Flying to America (2008)
What To Do Next		Amateurs (1976)
And Then		Amateurs (1976); Flying to America (2008)
The Discovery		Amateurs (1976); Flying to America (2008)
The Reference		Amateurs (1976); Flying to America (2008)
You Are as Brave as Vincent Van Gogh		Amateurs (1976); Flying to America (2008)
I Have for Some Time...	"Notes and Comments," The New Yorker, October 10, 1977	The Teachings of Don B. (1992)
The Crisis	The New Yorker, October 24, 1977	Great Days (1979); Sixty Stories (1981)
The Apology	The New Yorker, February 20, 1978	Great Days (1979); Flying to America (2008)
The New Music	the New Yorker, June 19, 1978	Great Days (1979); Sixty Stories (1981)
How I Write My Songs	The New Yorker, November 27, 1978	Sixty Stories (1981)
At Last, it is Time...	"Notes and Comments," The New Yorker, November 27, 1978	The Teachings of Don B. (1992)
We dropped in at the Stanhope...	"Notes and Comments", The New Yorker, December 25, 1978	The Teachings of Don B. (1992)
Aria	The New Yorker, March 12, 1979	Sixty Stories (1981)
Well We All Had Our; Willie & Wade Records...	Harper's, June 1979	Overnight to Many Distant Cities (1983); The Teachings of Don B. (1992)
Languishing, Half Deep in Summer	"Notes and Comments," The New Yorker, July 30, 1979	The Teachings of Don B. (1992)
Grandmother's House	The New Yorker, September 3, 1979	Sixty Stories (1981)
Great Days		Great Days (1979); Forty Stories (1987)
The Question Party	Great Days (1979)	Flying to America (2008)
Cortés and Montezuma		Great Days (1979); Sixty Stories (1981)
The Zombies	The New Yorker, April 25, 1977	Great Days (1979); Sixty Stories (1981)
The King of Jazz		Great Days (1979); Sixty Stories (1981)
Morning		Great Days (1979); Sixty Stories (1981)
The Abduction from the Seraglio		Great Days (1979); Sixty Stories (1981)
On the Steps of the Conservatory		Great Days (1979); Sixty Stories (1981)
The Leap		Great Days (1979); Sixty Stories (1981)
Concerning the Bodyguard		Great Days (1979); Forty Stories (1987)
Belief		Great Days (1979); Flying to America (2008)
Tales of the Swedish Army		Great Days (1979); Flying to America (2008)

=== 1980–1989 ===
Title	Originally published in	Collected in:
I Wrote a Letter...	"Notes and Comments," The New Yorker, October 27, 1980	The Teachings of Don B. (1992)
Pepperoni	The New Yorker, December 1, 1980	Forty Stories (1987)
Thailand	The New Yorker, December 29, 1980	Sixty Stories (1981)
The Emperor	The New Yorker, January 26, 1981	Sixty Stories (1981)
Challenge	The New Yorker, October 5, 1981	The Teachings of Don B. (1992)
Donald Barthelme's; Fine Homemade Soups	The Great American; Writer's Cookbook (1981)	The Teachings of Don B. (1992)
The Emerald		Sixty Stories (1981)
The Farewell		Sixty Stories (1981)
Heroes		Sixty Stories (1981)
Bishop		Sixty Stories (1981)
Kissing the President	The New Yorker, August 1, 1983	The Teachings of Don B. (1992)
I am, at the Moment...	Interchapter in Overnight to Many Distant Cities (1983)	The Teachings of Don B. (1992)
Now that I am Older...	Interchapter in Overnight to Many Distant Cities (1983)	The Teachings of Don B. (1992)
Speaking of the Human Body...	Interchapter in Overnight to Many Distant Cities (1983)	The Teachings of Don B. (1992)
A Woman Seated on a Plain Wooden Chair...	Interchapter in Overnight to Many Distant Cities (1983)	The Teachings of Don B. (1992)
That Guy in the Back Room...	Interchapter in Overnight to Many Distant Cities (1983)	The Teachings of Don B. (1992)
Financially, the Paper...	The New Yorker	Interchapter in Overnight to Many Distant Cities (1983)
I Put a Name in an Envelope...	Interchapter in Overnight to Many Distant Cities (1983)	
They Called for More Structure...	Interchapter in Overnight to Many Distant Cities (1983)	The Teachings of Don B. (1992)
When He Came...	The New Yorker	Interchapter in Overnight to Many Distant Cities (1983)
The First Thing the Baby Did Wrong...	Interchapter in Overnight to Many Distant Cities (1983)	
On Our Street...	The New Yorker	Interchapter in Overnight to Many Distant Cities (1983)
Affection	The New Yorker	Overnight to Many Distant Cities (1983); Forty Stories (1987)
Visitors	The New Yorker	Overnight to Many Distant Cities (1983); Forty Stories (1987)
Lightning	The New Yorker	Overnight to Many Distant Cities (1983); Forty Stories (1987)
The New Owner		Overnight to Many Distant Cities (1983); Forty Stories (1987)
Sakrete	The New Yorker	Overnight to Many Distant Cities (1983); Forty Stories (1987)
Overnight to Many Distant Cities	The New Yorker	Overnight to Many Distant Cities (1983); Forty Stories (1987)
The Baby		Overnight to Many Distant Cities (1983); Forty Stories (1987)
Captain Blood	The New Yorker	Overnight to Many Distant Cities (1983); Forty Stories (1987)
Conversations with Goethe	The New Yorker	Overnight to Many Distant Cities (1983); Forty Stories (1987)
The Palace at Four A.M.	The New Yorker	Overnight to Many Distant Cities (1983); Forty Stories (1987)
Terminus		Overnight to Many Distant Cities (1983); Forty Stories (1987)
Henrietta and Alexandra		Overnight to Many Distant Cities (1983); Flying to America (2008)
Return	Houston Post, March 23, 1984	The Teachings of Don B. (1992)
Sinbad	The New Yorker, August 27, 1984	Forty Stories (1987)
The Art Of Baseball	The Spirit of Sport (1984)	The Teachings of Don B. (1992)
Construction	The New Yorker, April 29, 1985	Forty Stories (1987)
When I Didn't Win...	"Notes and Comments," The New Yorker, September 2, 1985	The Teachings of Don B. (1992)
Basil From Her Garden	The New Yorker, October 13, 1985	
Bluebeard	The New Yorker, June 16, 1986	Forty Stories (1987)
More Zero	The New Yorker, July 7, 1986	The Teachings of Don B. (1992)
My Lover Said to Me...	"Notes and Comments,"; The New Yorker, August 11, 1986	The Teachings of Don B. (1992)
January	The New Yorker, April 6, 1987	Forty Stories (1987)
Three Great Meals	The New Yorker, June 1, 1987	The Teachings of Don B. (1992)
The Author	The New Yorker, June 15, 1987	The Teachings of Don B. (1992)
Jaws	The New Yorker, August 17, 1987	Forty Stories (1987)
Chablis	The New Yorker, December 12, 1983	Forty Stories (1987)
On the Deck	The New Yorker, January 12, 1987	Forty Stories (1987)
Opening		Forty Stories (1987)
Rif		Forty Stories (1987)
Tickets	The New Yorker, March 6, 1989	Flying to America (2008)

=== Posthumously published stories ===
Title	Originally published in
Ming	The Teachings of Don B. (1992)
Bliss	The Teachings of Don B. (1992)
Wasteland!	The Teachings of Don B. (1992)
Heather	Flying to America (2008)
Pandemonium	Flying to America (2008)

== Plays ==
Title	Notes	Collected in
The Friends of the Family	Written as a radio play; includes sections from "For I'm the Boy" and "The Big Broadcast of 1938"	The Teachings of Don B. (1992)
The Conservatory	Written as a radio play; includes sections from "On the Steps of the Conservatory" and "Great Days"	The Teachings of Don B. (1992)
Snow White	Adapted from the novel of the same name	The Teachings of Don B. (1992)
Great Days	Adapted from the story of the same name first produced off-Broadway at American Place Theater, 1983	
