= The Amateurs (band) =

- Origin: Birmingham, England
- Genres: Indie rock
- Years active: 2007–present
- Members: Matthew Colley; Andrew Fletcher; Alex Wesley
- Past members: Richard Oliver; Marcus Jones; Jimmy Holliday
- Website: The Amateurs Official Website

The Amateurs are an indie rock band formed in and around Birmingham, England. They released their debut EP, "Homesick" in March 2009, which was championed by Kerrang! Radio, who had supported the band since awarding them 'Best Unsigned Song of 2007'.

Their debut release, "Homesick", received mixed reviews, including 'Single of the Week' on inthenews.co.uk.

The band was awarded a slot at the Leeds Festival in 2009 by Oxfam.

In April 2010, The Amateurs were selected from thousands of European acts to be "The Sound of Bamboo", a product launched by Wacom. Their second single "Saturday Night", accompanies the Bamboo television advertisement.

After playing a series of shows with ELIZA at several universities in Scotland in October 2010, the band released more material in the form of third single "Hole in My Soul", on 6 December 2010, followed by their debut music video and most successful single to date, "The Rebel". The James Bond-inspired video was directed by Chris Stone. "The Rebel" became the band's fourth single and was released on 31 January 2011.
