= Joslin's Canadian Open =

Grappling competition

The Joslin's Canadian Open is the largest grappling tournament in Canada. The Canadian Open has been run as an annual event and drew over 700 competitors in 2007. The 2008 event was reported to have close to 1000 competitors. The 2008 Joslin's open tournament featured eight rings, five of them being in the main gym and two of them in the smaller gym with one left in the school's auditorium. In 2009 the grappling portion of the tournament was expanded to 2 days and 142 divisions, the karate portion was moved to its own weekend.

After starting the tournament with just karate in 1976, the new popularity of kick boxing nearly did it in. A decade after that first event, Rick Joslin shut things down, until 1996 when he restarted.

The event is hosted by Rick and Jeff Joslin.
