= Canadian Cross Country Championships =

Cross country championship in Canada

- Location: Canada
- Event type: Cross country running
- Distance: 10 km: senior men and women; 8 km: U20 and masters men; 6 km: U18 boys, U20 women, masters women; 4 km: U18 girls
- Organizer: Athletics Canada

The Canadian Cross Country Championships is the annual national championships for cross country running in Canada. Typically held in late-November and organized by Athletics Canada, it consists of races in U18, U20, Senior, and Masters categories. It also serves as part of the selection process for Canadian teams at the NACAC and World Cross Country Championships.

Alongside individual titles, Athletics Canada awards club and branch championships in each race.

As of 2024, the senior men's and women's races are 10 km long; U20 and masters men's races are 8 km; U20 women's, U18 boys, and masters women's races are 6 km; and the U18 girls. However, race distances have varied in the past.

The most recent edition was held in on 25 November, 2023 in Ottawa, Ontario. The next edition is set to take place 30 November, 2024 in London, Ontario.

== Results ==
=== Senior Men ===
Year	Venue	Winner	Time	Club Champion	Branch Champion
2017	Kingston, Ontario	Lucas Bruchet (British Columbia)	30:20	Speed River Track and Field Club (Ontario)	Ontario
2018	Kingston, Ontario	Lucas Bruchet (British Columbia)	29:54	Unattached Ontario	Ontario
2019	Abbotsford, British Columbia	Mike Tate (Ontario)	29:10	London Western T.F.C. (Ontario)	Ontario
2020	Abbotsford, British Columbia	cancelled due to COVID-19 pandemic			
2021	Ottawa, Ontario	John Gay (British Columbia)	31:34	Vancouver Thunderbirds (British Columbia)	British Columbia
2022	Ottawa, Ontario	Connor Black (Ontario)	29:38	London Western T.F.C. (Ontario)	Ontario
2023	Ottawa, Ontario	Kieran Lumb (British Columbia)	29:18	Club d'Athlétisme de l'Université Laval (Quebec)	Quebec
2024	London, Ontario	TBD			
2025	London, Ontario	TBD			

=== Senior Women ===
Year	Venue	Winner	Time	Club Champion	Branch Champion
2017	Kingston, Ontario	Claire Sumner (Ontario)	34:48		
2018	Kingston, Ontario	Geneviève Lalonde (New Brunswick)	34:47	Speed River Track and Field Club (Ontario)	Ontario
2019	Abbotsford, British Columbia	Geneviève Lalonde (New Brunswick)	33:22	Langley Mustangs (British Columbia)	British Columbia
2020	Abbotsford, British Columbia	cancelled due to COVID-19 pandemic			
2021	Ottawa, Ontario	Geneviève Lalonde (New Brunswick)	36:21	Club d'Athlétisme de l'Université Laval (Quebec)	Quebec
2022	Ottawa, Ontario	Julie-Anne Staehli (Ontario)	34:12	Vancouver Thunderbirds (British Columbia)	Ontario
2023	Ottawa, Ontario	Ceili McCabe (British Columbia)	33:28	Vancouver Thunderbirds (British Columbia)	British Columbia
2024	London, Ontario	TBD			
2025	London, Ontario	TBD			
