= Legion National Youth Track and Field Championships =

- Sport: Track and field
- Founded: 1977
- Country: Canada
- Related competitions: Canadian Track and Field Championships Canadian Junior Track and Field Championships
- Official website: http://www.youth.athletics.ca/

The Legion National Youth Track and Field Championships is an annual track and field competition organized by the Royal Canadian Legion and sanctioned by Athletics Canada. It serves as the Canadian youth national championships for the sport.

== History ==
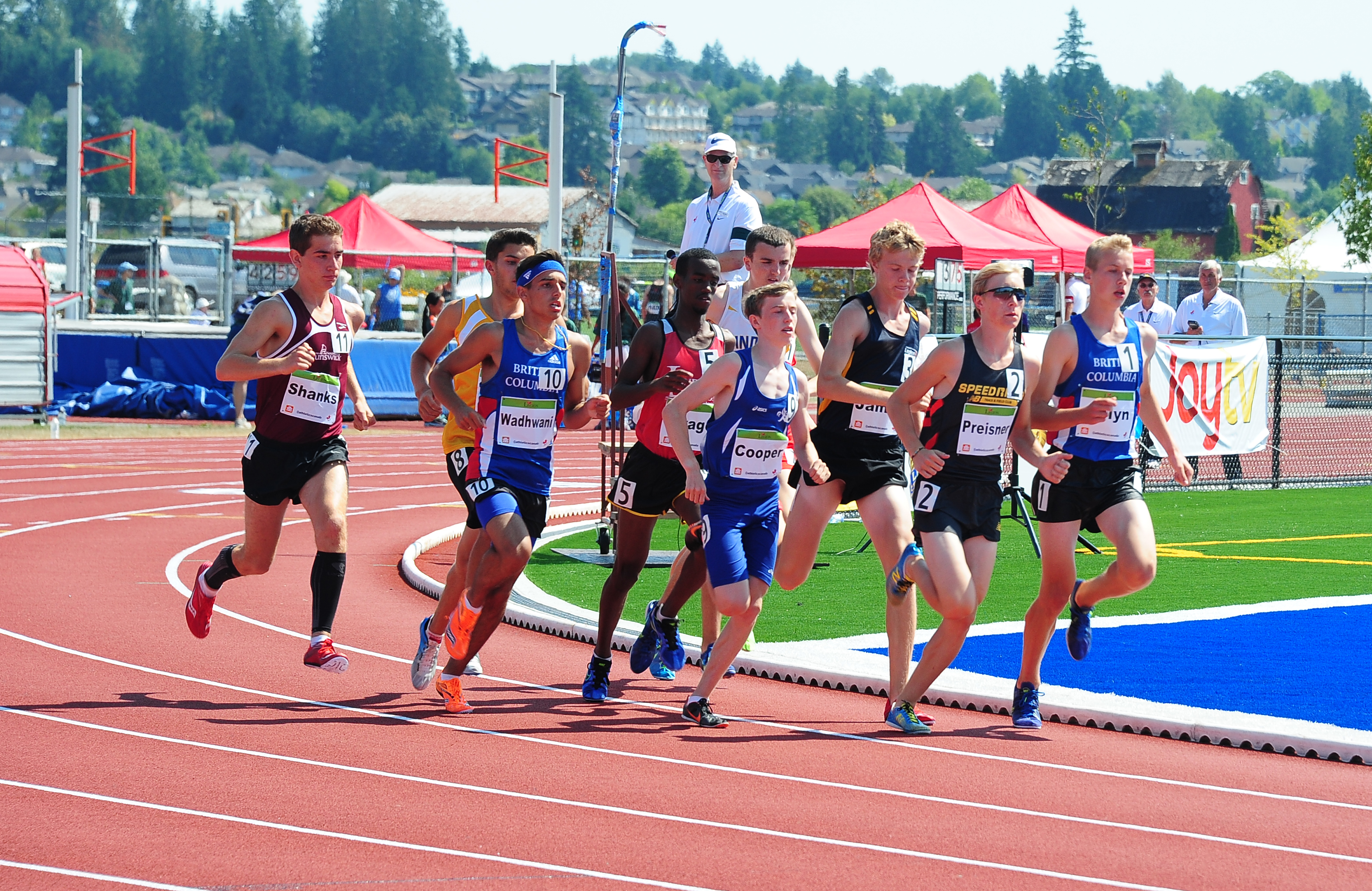
Male runners at the Legion National youth Track and Field Championships in 2013.

The Royal Canadian Legion has been involved in youth athletics since the 1950s. In 1977 the first Legion National Youth Track and Field Championships were held at Oromocto, New Brunswick. In 2010 the Championships were designated as the national youth championships by Athletics Canada.

== Host Locations ==
Year	Location
2027	Regina, SK
2026	Regina, SK
2025	Calgary, AB
2024	Calgary, AB
2023	Sherbrooke, QC
2022	Sherbrooke, QC
2019	Sydney, NS
2018	Brandon, MB
2017	Brandon, MB
2016	Ste. Therese, QC
2015	Ste. Therese, QC
2014	Langley, BC
2013	Langley, BC
2012	Charlottetown, PE
2011	Ottawa, ON
2010	Ottawa, ON
2009	Sherbrooke, QC
2008	Sherbrooke, QC
2007	Oromocto, NB
2006	Burnaby, BC
2005	Edmonton, AB
2004	Sudbury, ON
2003	Kitchener/Waterloo, ON
2002	Sherbrooke, QC
2001	Sherbrooke, QC
2000	Calgary, AB
1999	Sudbury, ON
1998	Prince George, BC
1997	St. John's, NF
1996	Sherbrooke, QC
1995	Winnipeg, MB
1994	Ottawa, ON
1993	Saskatoon, SK
1992	Calgary, AB
1991	Toronto, ON
1990	St. John's, NF
1989	Victoria, BC
1988	Quebec, QC
1987	Calgary, AB
1986	Sudbury, ON
1985	Saskatoon, SK
1984	Halifax, NS
1983	Ottawa, ON
1982	Oromocto, NB
1981	Hamilton, ON
1980	Saskatoon, SK
1979	St. John's, NF
1978	Peace Garden, MB
1977	Oromocto, NB
