= Canadian U20 Track and Field Championships =

Annual track and field competition

- Sport: Track and field
- Country: Canada
- Related competitions: Canadian Track and Field Championships Legion National Youth Track and Field Championships
- Official website: http://www.juniors.athletics.ca/

The Canadian U20 Track and Field Championships is an annual track and field competition sanctioned by Athletics Canada. It serves as the Canadian junior national championships for the sport. The event is typically held alongside the Canadian Track and Field Championships, the senior national championships.

The most recent edition of the event took place in July of 2023 in Langley, British Columbia.The next edition is set to be held in Montreal, alongside the 2024 Canadian Track and Field Championships
