= Athletics at the 2013 Bolivarian Games – Results =

These are the full results of the athletics competition at the 2013 Bolivarian Games which took place between November 26 and November 30, 2013 in Trujillo, Perú.

== Men's results ==
=== 100 meters ===
Heat 1 – 26 November – Wind: 0.3 m/s

| Rank | Lane | Name | Nationality | Time | Notes |
|---|---|---|---|---|---|
| 1 | 4 | Álex Quiñónez | Ecuador | 10.52 | Q |
| 2 | 2 | Daniel Grueso | Colombia | 10.61 | Q |
| 3 | 3 | Álvaro Cassiani | Venezuela | 10.75 | Q |
| 4 | 6 | Fredy Maidana | Paraguay | 10.85 | |
| 5 | 7 | Cristián Reyes | Chile | 10.87 | |
| 6 | 5 | Artur Rojas | Bolivia | 10.96 | |
| 7 | 8 | Frank Sánchez | Peru | 11.21 | |

Heat 2 – 26 November – Wind: -0.1 m/s

| Rank | Lane | Name | Nationality | Time | Notes |
|---|---|---|---|---|---|
| 1 | 4 | Isidro Montoya | Colombia | 10.61 | Q |
| 2 | 3 | Andy Martínez | Peru | 10.66 | Q |
| 3 | 2 | Franklin Nazareno | Ecuador | 10.71 | Q |
| 4 | 6 | Andrés Rodríguez | Panama | 10.73 | q |
| 5 | 5 | Diego Rivas | Venezuela | 10.83 | q |
| 6 | 7 | Óscar Grajeda | Bolivia | 11.14 | |

Final – 26 November – Wind: -0.3 m/s

| Rank | Lane | Name | Nationality | Time | Notes |
|---|---|---|---|---|---|
| 1st place, gold medalist(s) | 5 | Álex Quiñónez | Ecuador | 10.52 | |
| 2nd place, silver medalist(s) | 6 | Isidro Montoya | Colombia | 10.63 | |
| 3rd place, bronze medalist(s) | 8 | Álvaro Cassiani | Venezuela | 10.65 | |
| 4 | 4 | Daniel Grueso | Colombia | 10.70 | |
| 5 | 7 | Franklin Nazareno | Ecuador | 10.71 | |
| 6 | 2 | Andrés Rodríguez | Panama | 10.72 | |
| 7 | 3 | Andy Martínez | Peru | 10.81 | |
| 8 | 1 | Diego Rivas | Venezuela | 10.84 | |

=== 200 meters ===
Heat 1 – 27 November – Wind: -0.5 m/s

| Rank | Lane | Name | Nationality | Time | Notes |
|---|---|---|---|---|---|
| 1 | 4 | Álex Quiñónez | Ecuador | 20.82 | Q |
| 2 | 5 | Jermaine Chirinos | Venezuela | 21.10 | Q |
| 3 | 3 | Andrés Rodríguez | Panama | 21.56 | Q |
| 4 | 2 | Vladimir Valencia | Colombia | 21.65 | q |
| 5 | 6 | Andy Martínez | Peru | 21.65 | q |
| 6 | 7 | Leonardo Camargo | Bolivia | 22.87 | |

Heat 2 – 27 November – Wind: -1.4 m/s

| Rank | Lane | Name | Nationality | Time | Notes |
|---|---|---|---|---|---|
| 1 | 2 | Álvaro Cassiani | Venezuela | 21.47 | Q |
| 2 | 3 | Daniel Grueso | Colombia | 21.57 | Q |
| 3 | 4 | Cristián Reyes | Chile | 21.65 | Q |
| 4 | 6 | Fredy Maidana | Paraguay | 21.66 | |
| 5 | 8 | Jhon Valencia | Ecuador | 21.84 | |
| 6 | 5 | Artur Rojas | Bolivia | 21.87 | |
| 7 | 7 | Frank Sánchez | Peru | 22.42 | |

Final – 27 November – Wind: 0.0 m/s

| Rank | Lane | Name | Nationality | Time | Notes |
|---|---|---|---|---|---|
| 1st place, gold medalist(s) | 4 | Álex Quiñónez | Ecuador | 20.47 | GR |
| 2nd place, silver medalist(s) | 5 | Jermaine Chirinos | Venezuela | 21.08 | |
| 3rd place, bronze medalist(s) | 3 | Álvaro Cassiani | Venezuela | 21.30 | |
| 4 | 6 | Daniel Grueso | Colombia | 21.40 | |
| 5 | 8 | Cristián Reyes | Chile | 21.48 | |
| 6 | 7 | Andrés Rodríguez | Panama | 21.60 | |
| 7 | 1 | Andy Martínez | Peru | 21.63 | |
| 8 | 2 | Vladimir Valencia | Colombia | 21.77 | |

=== 400 meters ===
Heat 1 – 26 November

| Rank | Lane | Name | Nationality | Time | Notes |
|---|---|---|---|---|---|
| 1 | 4 | Máximo Mercedes | Dominican Republic | 46.37 | Q |
| 2 | 7 | Rafith Rodríguez | Colombia | 46.68 | Q |
| 3 | 6 | Alberth Bravo | Venezuela | 47.06 | Q |
| 4 | 5 | Joel Linch | Panama | 48.30 | q |
| 5 | 3 | Edmundo Díaz | Peru | 48.72 | q |

Heat 2 – 26 November

| Rank | Lane | Name | Nationality | Time | Notes |
|---|---|---|---|---|---|
| 1 | 5 | Jhon Perlaza | Colombia | 46.94 | Q |
| 2 | 4 | Noel Campos | Venezuela | 47.47 | Q |
| 3 | 3 | Emerson Chalá | Ecuador | 48.21 | Q |
| 4 | 7 | Brayan Erazo | Peru | 49.13 | |
| 5 | 6 | Diego Gonzales | Bolivia | 50.33 | |

Final – 26 November

| Rank | Lane | Name | Nationality | Time | Notes |
|---|---|---|---|---|---|
| 1st place, gold medalist(s) | 3 | Rafith Rodríguez | Colombia | 45.62 | |
| 2nd place, silver medalist(s) | 7 | Alberth Bravo | Venezuela | 46.24 | |
| 3rd place, bronze medalist(s) | 6 | Noel Campos | Venezuela | 46.41 | |
| 4 | 5 | Jhon Perlaza | Colombia | 46.52 | |
| 5 | 4 | Máximo Mercedes | Dominican Republic | 46.58 | |
| 6 | 8 | Emerson Chalá | Ecuador | 47.84 | |
| 7 | 2 | Joel Linch | Panama | 48.11 | |
| 8 | 1 | Edmundo Díaz | Peru | 48.41 | |

=== 800 meters ===
Final – 28 November

| Rank | Name | Nationality | Time | Notes |
|---|---|---|---|---|
| 1st place, gold medalist(s) | Rafith Rodríguez | Colombia | 1:45.14 | GR |
| 2nd place, silver medalist(s) | Lucirio Antonio Garrido | Venezuela | 1:47.32 | |
| 3rd place, bronze medalist(s) | Roiman Ramírez | Venezuela | 1:48.03 | |
| 4 | Jhon Sinisterra | Colombia | 1:48.82 | |
| 5 | Willian García | Peru | 1:49.34 | |
| 6 | Alex Cisneros | Ecuador | 1:50.30 | |
| 7 | David Washco | Ecuador | 1:50.68 | |
| 8 | Edmundo Díaz | Peru | 1:51.75 | |

=== 1500 meters ===
Final – 26 November

| Rank | Name | Nationality | Time | Notes |
|---|---|---|---|---|
| 1st place, gold medalist(s) | Freddy Espinosa | Colombia | 3:48.97 | |
| 2nd place, silver medalist(s) | Iván López | Chile | 3:49.08 | |
| 3rd place, bronze medalist(s) | Marvin Blanco | Venezuela | 3:50.95 | |
| 4 | David Washco | Ecuador | 3:51.92 | |
| 5 | Mauricio Valdivia | Chile | 3:52.40 | |
| 6 | Alexis Peña | Venezuela | 3:55.13 | |
| 7 | Víctor González | Guatemala | 3:55.89 | |
| 8 | Julio Seminario | Peru | 3:55.97 | |
| 9 | Alex Cisneros | Ecuador | 3:56.37 | |
| 10 | Willy Canchanya | Peru | 3:57.53 | |

=== 5000 meters ===
Final – 29 November

| Rank | Name | Nationality | Time | Notes |
|---|---|---|---|---|
| 1st place, gold medalist(s) | Leslie Encina | Chile | 13:54.6 | GR |
| 2nd place, silver medalist(s) | Iván López | Chile | 13:59.1 | |
| 3rd place, bronze medalist(s) | Jhon Cusi | Peru | 14:05.0 | |
| 4 | Andrés Camargo | Colombia | 14:13.8 | |
| 5 | José Luis Rojas | Peru | 14:18.2 | |
| 6 | Daniel Toroya | Bolivia | 14:19.7 | |
| 7 | John Tello | Colombia | 14:55.7 | |
| 8 | Jean Manuel Pérez | Bolivia | 15:28.8 | |
| 9 | Víctor González | Guatemala | 15:49.2 | |
| | Alexis Peña | Venezuela | DNF | |
| | José Peña | Venezuela | DNS | |
| | Bayron Piedra | Ecuador | DNS | |

=== 10,000 meters ===
Final – 27 November

| Rank | Name | Nationality | Time | Notes |
|---|---|---|---|---|
| 1st place, gold medalist(s) | Leslie Encina | Chile | 28:59.79 | GR |
| 2nd place, silver medalist(s) | Bayron Piedra | Ecuador | 29:01.64 | |
| 3rd place, bronze medalist(s) | Gerard Giraldo | Colombia | 29:03.59 | |
| 4 | Jhon Cusi | Peru | 29:05.60 | |
| 5 | José Luis Rojas | Peru | 30:07.84 | |
| 6 | John Tello | Colombia | 30:13.96 | |
| 7 | Daniel Toroya | Bolivia | 30:16.56 | |
| 8 | Reynaldo Huanca | Bolivia | 30:39.00 | |
| | Jorge Cabrera | Paraguay | DNF | |

=== Half marathon ===
Final – 30 November

| Rank | Name | Nationality | Time | Notes |
|---|---|---|---|---|
| 1st place, gold medalist(s) | Diego Colorado | Colombia | 1:06:16 | GR |
| 2nd place, silver medalist(s) | Cristopher Guajardo | Chile | 1:06:21 | |
| 3rd place, bronze medalist(s) | Miguel Ángel Almachi | Ecuador | 1:06:25 | |
| 4 | Raúl Machacuay | Peru | 1:06:29 | |
| 5 | Raúl Pacheco | Peru | 1:07:01 | |
| 6 | Segundo Jami | Ecuador | 1:08:09 | |
| 7 | José Amado García | Guatemala | 1:08:45 | |
| 8 | Lervis Arias | Venezuela | 1:09:04 | |
| 9 | Jorge César Fernández | Bolivia | 1:10:24 | |
| 10 | Jorge Cabrera | Paraguay | 1:14:35 | |

=== 110 meters hurdles ===
Final – 26 November – Wind: -0.4 m/s

| Rank | Lane | Name | Nationality | Time | Notes |
|---|---|---|---|---|---|
| 1st place, gold medalist(s) | 4 | Jorge McFarlane | Peru | 13.76 | |
| 2nd place, silver medalist(s) | 5 | Paulo Villar | Colombia | 13.80 | |
| 3rd place, bronze medalist(s) | 6 | Javier McFarlane | Peru | 14.00 | |
| 4 | 3 | Yeison Rivas | Colombia | 14.37 | |
| 5 | 8 | John Tamayo | Ecuador | 14.45 | |
| 6 | 7 | Diego Lyon | Chile | 14.53 | |
| 7 | 2 | Luis Escobar | Ecuador | 14.66 | |
| 8 | 1 | Nelson Acebey | Bolivia | 15.45 | |

=== 400 meters hurdles ===
Heat 1 – 27 November

| Rank | Lane | Name | Nationality | Time | Notes |
|---|---|---|---|---|---|
| 1 | 3 | Emerson Chalá | Ecuador | 51.56 | Q |
| 2 | 4 | Paulo Villar | Colombia | 51.68 | Q |
| 3 | 6 | Gustavo Gutiérrez | Chile | 51.91 | Q |
| 4 | 5 | Víctor Solarte | Venezuela | 52.28 | q |
| 5 | 7 | Nickols Yarmas | Peru | 56.59 | q |

Heat 2 – 27 November

| Rank | Lane | Name | Nationality | Time | Notes |
|---|---|---|---|---|---|
| 1 | 4 | Lucirio Francisco Garrido | Venezuela | 51.99 | Q |
| 2 | 6 | John Tamayo | Ecuador | 53.37 | Q |
| 3 | 3 | Yeison Rivas | Colombia | 54.57 | Q |
| | 5 | Maximo Mercedes | Dominican Republic | DNF | |
| | 7 | Roy Morales | Peru | DNS | |

Final – 28 November

| Rank | Lane | Name | Nationality | Time | Notes |
|---|---|---|---|---|---|
| 1st place, gold medalist(s) | 3 | Lucirio Francisco Garrido | Venezuela | 49.74 | GR |
| 2nd place, silver medalist(s) | 4 | Emerson Chalá | Ecuador | 49.76 | |
| 3rd place, bronze medalist(s) | 5 | Paulo Villar | Colombia | 50.34 | |
| 4 | 2 | Víctor Solarte | Venezuela | 50.58 | |
| 5 | 8 | Yeison Rivas | Colombia | 50.69 | |
| 6 | 7 | Gustavo Gutiérrez | Chile | 51.57 | |
| 7 | 6 | John Tamayo | Ecuador | 53.59 | |
| | 1 | Nickols Yarmas | Peru | DNF | |

=== 3000 meters steeplechase ===
Final – 29 November

| Rank | Name | Nationality | Time | Notes |
|---|---|---|---|---|
| 1st place, gold medalist(s) | José Gregorio Peña | Venezuela | 8:26.6 | GR |
| 2nd place, silver medalist(s) | Gerard Giraldo | Colombia | 8:28.6 | |
| 3rd place, bronze medalist(s) | Marvin Blanco | Venezuela | 8:41.9 | |
| 4 | Mauricio Franco | Colombia | 8:44.9 | |
| 5 | Walter Nina | Peru | 9:17.8 | |
| 6 | Rubén Toroya | Bolivia | 9:23.1 | |
| 7 | Gregorio Basilio | Peru | 9:23.9 | |
| 8 | Miguel Chan | Guatemala | 9:42.1 | |
| | Mauricio Valdivia | Chile | DNF | |

=== High jump ===
Final – 28 November

| Rank | Name | Nationality | 2.00 | 2.05 | 2.10 | 2.13 | 2.16 | 2.17 | 2.19 | Result | Notes |
|---|---|---|---|---|---|---|---|---|---|---|---|
| 1st place, gold medalist(s) | Arturo Chávez | Peru | - | - | O | - | XO | O | XXX | 2.17 | |
| 2nd place, silver medalist(s) | Wanner Miller | Colombia | - | O | - | O | XO | X- | XX | 2.16 | |
| 3rd place, bronze medalist(s) | Eure Yánez | Venezuela | - | - | O | - | XXO | XXX | | 2.16 | |
| 4 | Henry Edmon | Panama | XXO | XXX | | | | | | 2.00 | |

=== Pole vault ===
Final – 27 November

| Rank | Name | Nationality | 4.30 | 4.40 | 4.50 | 4.60 | 4.70 | 4.80 | 4.85 | 5.00 | 5.11 | Result | Notes |
|---|---|---|---|---|---|---|---|---|---|---|---|---|---|
| 1st place, gold medalist(s) | Daniel Zupeuc | Chile | - | - | O | - | O | O | O | XXO | XXX | 5.00 | |
| 2nd place, silver medalist(s) | Felipe Andrés Fuentes | Chile | - | - | XO | O | O | XXX | | | | 4.70 | |
| 3rd place, bronze medalist(s) | Francisco León | Peru | - | XO | - | O | XO | - | XXX | | | 4.70 | |
| 4 | José Pacho | Ecuador | - | - | - | O | XXX | | | | | 4.60 | |
| 5 | Pedro Figueroa | El Salvador | - | - | XO | - | XXX | | | | | 4.50 | |
| 6 | Luis Salcedo | Peru | XXO | - | XXO | XXX | | | | | | 4.50 | |
| | Walter Viafara | Colombia | - | - | - | - | XXX | | | | | NH | |
| | Igor Morales | Venezuela | | | | | | | | | | DNS | |

=== Long jump ===
Final – 29 November

| Rank | Name | Nationality | #1 | #2 | #3 | #4 | #5 | #6 | Result | Notes |
|---|---|---|---|---|---|---|---|---|---|---|
| 1st place, gold medalist(s) | Jorge McFarlane | Peru | 7.49 (0.4 m/s) | 7.50 (-1.8 m/s) | X | 7.78 w (2.2 m/s) | 5.79 (1.6 m/s) | 7.80 (0.0 m/s) | 7.80 (0.0 m/s) | |
| 2nd place, silver medalist(s) | Javier McFarlane | Peru | 7.44 (0.9 m/s) | 7.46 (1.8 m/s) | 7.63 (0.9 m/s) | 7.48 w (3.2 m/s) | 7.56 (0.6 m/s) | 7.33 (1.2 m/s) | 7.63 (0.9 m/s) | |
| 3rd place, bronze medalist(s) | Edwin Murillo | Colombia | 7.30 (0.0 m/s) | 7.52 (0.1 m/s) | 7.37 w (2.2 m/s) | 7.30 (0.0 m/s) | 7.47 (0.9 m/s) | 7.49 (1.3 m/s) | 7.52 (0.1 m/s) | |
| 4 | Diego Hernández | Venezuela | X | 7.37 (1.4 m/s) | X | 7.52 (0.0 m/s) | 7.28 (0.6 m/s) | X | 7.52 (0.0 m/s) | |
| 5 | Santiago Cova | Venezuela | 7.31 (1.5 m/s) | 7.25 (0.5 m/s) | 7.22 w (2.2 m/s) | X | 7.21 (0.5 m/s) | 7.49 (0.8 m/s) | 7.49 (0.8 m/s) | |
| 6 | Eddy Florián | Dominican Republic | 7.09 (0.1 m/s) | 7.04 (2.0 m/s) | - | - | 6.95 (0.0 m/s) | - | 7.09 (0.1 m/s) | |
| 7 | Bryan Castro | Ecuador | X | X | 6.49 (0.2 m/s) | 3.88 (1.3 m/s) | 6.49 w (2.2 m/s) | 6.66 (0.0 m/s) | 6.66 (0.0 m/s) | |
| 8 | Álvaro Toledo | Bolivia | X | X | 6.55 (0.0 m/s) | 6.15 (0.0 m/s) | 6.22 (1.8 m/s) | X | 6.55 (0.0 m/s) | |
| 9 | Miguel Alfaro | Bolivia | 6.19 (1.6 m/s) | X | X | | | | 6.19 (1.6 m/s) | |
| | Jhon Murillo | Colombia | | | | | | | DNS | |

=== Triple jump ===
Final – 26 November

| Rank | Name | Nationality | #1 | #2 | #3 | #4 | #5 | #6 | Result | Notes |
|---|---|---|---|---|---|---|---|---|---|---|
| 1st place, gold medalist(s) | Jhon Murillo | Colombia | 16.75 w (2.4 m/s) | 16.64 w (3.3 m/s) | 14.93 (1.6 m/s) | - | X | X | 16.75 w (2.4 m/s) | |
| 2nd place, silver medalist(s) | Eddy Florián | Dominican Republic | 15.72 w (4.0 m/s) | 16.24 w (3.6 m/s) | 15.91 w (3.2 m/s) | - | X | - | 16.24 w (3.6 m/s) | |
| 3rd place, bronze medalist(s) | Ángel Delgado | Venezuela | X | X | 15.94 w (3.7 m/s) | X | X | X | 15.94 w (3.7 m/s) | |
| 4 | Peter Camacho | Venezuela | X | X | X | 13.32 (1.3 m/s) | 14.52 w (3.5 m/s) | X | 14.52 w (3.5 m/s) | |
| 5 | Zenzey Onaja | Peru | 13.98 (1.8 m/s) | 14.41 w (4.2 m/s) | 13.99 w (2.3 m/s) | 13.73 w (2.8 m/s) | 13.81 (2.0 m/s) | 13.79 (1.3 m/s) | 14.41 w (4.2 m/s) | |
| 6 | Fabrizio Arguedas | Peru | 13.34 w (2.3 m/s) | 13.59 w (2.9 m/s) | 13.37 (1.9 m/s) | 13.52 w (2.1 m/s) | X | X | 13.59 w (2.9 m/s) | |

=== Shot put ===
Final – 29 November

| Rank | Name | Nationality | #1 | #2 | #3 | #4 | #5 | #6 | Result | Notes |
|---|---|---|---|---|---|---|---|---|---|---|
| 1st place, gold medalist(s) | Aldo González | Bolivia | 17.39 | 18.23 | 18.17 | 18.12 | 17.86 | 17.92 | 18.23 | |
| 2nd place, silver medalist(s) | Eder Moreno | Colombia | 17.78 | X | X | 17.02 | 18.18 | 18.03 | 18.18 | |
| 3rd place, bronze medalist(s) | Maximiliano Alonso | Chile | X | 16.80 | 17.15 | 17.53 | X | 16.92 | 17.53 | |
| 4 | Michael Putman | Peru | X | 16.81 | X | 16.58 | 17.37 | 17.08 | 17.37 | |
| 5 | José Joaquín Ballivián | Chile | 15.66 | X | 16.09 | X | 16.32 | 16.42 | 16.42 | |
| 6 | Juan Caicedo | Ecuador | 15.10 | 15.66 | 15.12 | 15.36 | 15.67 | 15.82 | 15.82 | |
| 7 | Luis Folgar | Guatemala | 14.82 | X | X | X | 14.37 | 14.76 | 14.82 | |
| 8 | Walter Cano | Peru | 13.55 | X | X | 13.52 | X | 14.03 | 14.03 | |
| 9 | Juan Aguilera | Ecuador | 12.12 | 12.39 | 13.02 | | | | 13.02 | |

=== Discus throw ===
Final – 27 November

| Rank | Name | Nationality | #1 | #2 | #3 | #4 | #5 | #6 | Result | Notes |
|---|---|---|---|---|---|---|---|---|---|---|
| 1st place, gold medalist(s) | Mauricio Ortega | Colombia | 56.64 | 57.40 | 54.42 | 55.87 | 59.67 | X | 59.67 | GR, AU20R, NR |
| 2nd place, silver medalist(s) | Jesús Parejo | Venezuela | 55.08 | 55.85 | 55.22 | 53.58 | X | X | 55.85 | |
| 3rd place, bronze medalist(s) | Maximiliano Alonso | Chile | 48.29 | 51.63 | 52.72 | 52.40 | 53.84 | 52.50 | 53.84 | |
| 4 | Juan José Caicedo | Ecuador | 48.70 | 52.19 | 52.71 | X | X | 53.73 | 53.73 | |
| 5 | Héctor Hurtado | Venezuela | 49.51 | 51.07 | 49.75 | 48.20 | 51.90 | 50.88 | 51.90 | |
| 6 | Nicolás Laso | Chile | 51.37 | X | 47.66 | X | X | 50.63 | 51.37 | |
| 7 | Michael Putman | Peru | 48.64 | 49.43 | 51.12 | 50.84 | X | X | 51.12 | |
| 8 | Juan Aguilera | Ecuador | 50.22 | 50.39 | 50.24 | X | X | X | 50.39 | |
| 9 | Stefano Paz | Peru | 41.96 | 44.12 | 41.39 | | | | 44.12 | |

=== Hammer throw ===
Final – 28 November

| Rank | Name | Nationality | #1 | #2 | #3 | #4 | #5 | #6 | Result | Notes |
|---|---|---|---|---|---|---|---|---|---|---|
| 1st place, gold medalist(s) | Pedro Muñoz | Venezuela | 64.55 | 66.83 | X | 65.71 | 68.24 | 68.35 | 68.35 | GR |
| 2nd place, silver medalist(s) | Aldo Bello | Venezuela | 64.67 | 65.10 | 65.29 | X | 63.73 | 65.76 | 65.76 | |
| 3rd place, bronze medalist(s) | Diego Berríos | Guatemala | 60.82 | 62.07 | 61.33 | X | 64.56 | 64.38 | 64.56 | |
| 4 | Jacobo de León | Colombia | X | 58.29 | X | 62.90 | 62.57 | 61.48 | 62.90 | |
| 5 | Guillermo Braulio | Ecuador | X | 57.10 | 59.95 | 58.93 | X | X | 59.95 | |
| 6 | Hevertt Álvarez | Chile | 55.60 | 59.82 | X | 59.18 | 58.96 | X | 59.82 | |
| 7 | Joseph Melgar | Peru | 54.43 | X | 54.06 | 52.97 | X | 52.18 | 54.43 | |
| 8 | Fernando Aguirre | Peru | 45.76 | X | X | X | X | 44.61 | 45.76 | |

=== Javelin throw ===
Final – 29 November

| Rank | Name | Nationality | #1 | #2 | #3 | #4 | #5 | #6 | Result | Notes |
|---|---|---|---|---|---|---|---|---|---|---|
| 1st place, gold medalist(s) | Víctor Fatecha | Paraguay | 66.32 | 74.49 | 72.73 | X | 72.04 | 73.19 | 74.49 | |
| 2nd place, silver medalist(s) | Dayron Márquez | Colombia | 72.48 | 73.84 | 73.83 | 68.54 | 72.50 | 73.43 | 73.84 | |
| 3rd place, bronze medalist(s) | Arley Ibargüen | Colombia | X | 69.08 | 69.72 | 68.23 | X | 71.78 | 71.78 | |
| 4 | Luis Taracena | Guatemala | 66.62 | 63.33 | 68.68 | 65.64 | 66.45 | 64.19 | 68.68 | |
| 5 | José Escobar | Ecuador | 60.01 | 65.37 | 66.52 | 63.04 | 65.82 | 59.89 | 66.52 | |
| 6 | Hiram Romero | Peru | 56.69 | 53.67 | X | 55.39 | X | 54.19 | 56.69 | |
| 7 | Mijael Calderón | Peru | 53.68 | 54.91 | X | 53.06 | 51.42 | 53.17 | 54.91 | |

=== Decathlon ===
Final – 27/28 November

The highest mark recorded in each event is highlighted in yellow

| Rank | Name | Nationality | 100m | LJ | SP | HJ | 400m | 110m H | DT | PV | JT | 1500m | Points | Notes |
|---|---|---|---|---|---|---|---|---|---|---|---|---|---|---|
| 1st place, gold medalist(s) | Óscar Campos | Venezuela | 11.11 -0.7 m/s 836 | 6.77; 1.5 m/s 760 | 12.51 637 | 1.80 627 | 50.3 794 | 15.40 -1.0 m/s 802 | 39.51 655 | 4.30 702 | 62.14 770 | 4:49.67 621 | 7204 | |
| 2nd place, silver medalist(s) | Ricardo Herrada | Venezuela | 11.54 -0.7 m/s 744 | 6.83; 1.8 m/s 774 | 13.06 671 | 1.89 705 | 50.6 781 | 14.99 -1.0 m/s 851 | 39.90 663 | 4.20 673 | 53.82 645 | 4:58.00 571 | 7078 | |
| 3rd place, bronze medalist(s) | José Lemos | Colombia | 11.44 -0.7 m/s 765 | 6.40; 2.6 m/s 675 | 15.92 846 | 1.86 679 | 52.5 697 | 15.53 -1.0 m/s 787 | 43.28 732 | 3.60 509 | 66.40 835 | 5:17.69 462 | 6987 | |
| 4 | Matías Dallaserra | Chile | 11.38 -0.7 m/s 778 | 6.33; 2.0 m/s 659 | 13.01 668 | 1.86 679 | 50.9 767 | 16.18 -1.0 m/s 713 | 33.81 540 | 4.00 617 | 43.01 486 | 4:40.82 675 | 6582 | |
| 5 | Juan Chávez | Peru | 11.68 -0.7 m/s 715 | 6.62; 2.1 m/s 725 | 11.18 557 | 1.77 602 | 52.2 710 | 16.28 -1.0 m/s 702 | 39.60 656 | 3.70 535 | 50.82 601 | 4:44.45 653 | 6456 | |
| | Vitorio Gotuzzo | Peru | 11.74 -0.7 m/s 703 | 5.94; 1.2 m/s 574 | 11.75 591 | 1.89 705 | DNS 0 | | | | | | DNF | |

=== 20 kilometers walk ===
Final – 27 November

| Rank | Name | Nationality | Time | Notes |
|---|---|---|---|---|
| 1st place, gold medalist(s) | Érick Barrondo | Guatemala | 1:23:25 | |
| 2nd place, silver medalist(s) | José Leonardo Montaña | Colombia | 1:23:43 | |
| 3rd place, bronze medalist(s) | Richard Vargas | Venezuela | 1:24:04 | |
| 4 | Marco Antonio Rodríguez | Bolivia | 1:25:22 | |
| 5 | Mauricio Arteaga | Ecuador | 1:26:13 | |
| 6 | Yerenman Salazar | Venezuela | 1:27:45 | |
| 7 | Rolando Saquipay | Ecuador | 1:32:02 | |
| 8 | Luis Henry Campos | Peru | 1:34:13 | |
| | Aníbal Paau | Guatemala | DQ | |
| | Sergio Carrillo | Peru | DQ | |

=== 50 kilometers walk ===
Final – 29 November

| Rank | Name | Nationality | Time | Notes |
|---|---|---|---|---|
| 1st place, gold medalist(s) | Andrés Chocho | Ecuador | 3:58:50 | GR |
| 2nd place, silver medalist(s) | Jorge Armando Ruiz | Colombia | 3:59:13 | |
| 3rd place, bronze medalist(s) | Jonnathan Cáceres | Ecuador | 4:02:47 | |
| 4 | Ferney Rojas | Colombia | 4:04:23 | |
| 5 | Pavel Chihuán | Peru | 4:08:33 | |
| 6 | Ronald Quispe | Bolivia | 4:11:22 | |
| | Jaime Quiyuch | Guatemala | DQ | |

=== 4 x 100 meters relay ===
Final – 28 November

| Rank | Lane | Nation | Competitors | Time | Notes |
|---|---|---|---|---|---|
| 1st place, gold medalist(s) | 4 | Venezuela | Diego Hernández; Diego Rivas; Álvaro Cassiani; Jermaine Chirinos | 39.34 | |
| 2nd place, silver medalist(s) | 3 | Ecuador | Luis Morán; Jhon Valencia; Franklin Nazareno; Álex Quiñónez | 39.62 | |
| 3rd place, bronze medalist(s) | 5 | Colombia | Yeison Rivas; Vladimir Valencia; Daniel Grueso; Isidro Montoya | 39.86 | |
| 4 | 6 | Peru | Frank Sánchez; Jair Mosquera; Jonathan Grandez; Andy Martínez | 40.75 | |
| 5 | 7 | Bolivia | Diego Gonzales; Óscar Grajeda; Leonardo Camargo; Artur Rojas | 41.51 | |

=== 4 x 400 meters relay ===
Final – 29 November

| Rank | Lane | Nation | Competitors | Time | Notes |
|---|---|---|---|---|---|
| 1st place, gold medalist(s) | 5 | Colombia | Jhon Perlaza; Jhon Sinisterra; Carlos Lemos; Rafith Rodríguez | 3:05.43 | GR |
| 2nd place, silver medalist(s) | 4 | Venezuela | Alberth Bravo; Lucirio Francisco Garrido; Lucirio Antonio Garrido; Noel Campos | 3:07.19 | |
| 3rd place, bronze medalist(s) | 6 | Ecuador | Franklin Nazareno; John Tamayo; Álex Quiñónez; Emerson Chalá | 3:12.19 | |
| 4 | 3 | Peru | Brayan Erazo; Marcelo Huaroto; Edmundo Díaz; Willian García | 3:14.85 | |

== Women's results ==
=== 100 meters ===
Heat 1 – 26 November – Wind: 0.1 m/s

| Rank | Lane | Name | Nationality | Time | Notes |
|---|---|---|---|---|---|
| 1 | 5 | Érika Chávez | Ecuador | 11.91 | Q |
| 2 | 3 | Andrea Purica | Venezuela | 11.93 | Q |
| 3 | 4 | Eliecit Palacios | Colombia | 12.00 | Q |
| 4 | 7 | Paola Mautino | Peru | 12.23 | q |
| 5 | 6 | Viviana Olivares | Chile | 12.37 | |

Heat 2 – 26 November – Wind: 0.1 m/s

| Rank | Lane | Name | Nationality | Time | Notes |
|---|---|---|---|---|---|
| 1 | 5 | Ángela Tenorio | Ecuador | 11.60 | Q |
| 2 | 3 | María Idrobo | Colombia | 11.61 | Q |
| 3 | 6 | Lexabeth Hidalgo | Venezuela | 11.92 | Q |
| 4 | 4 | Ruth Cassandra | Panama | 11.97 | q |
| 5 | 7 | Marcia Nazario | Peru | 12.41 | |
| 6 | 2 | Mariana Trujillo | Bolivia | 12.77 | |

Final – 26 November – Wind: -1.0 m/s

| Rank | Lane | Name | Nationality | Time | Notes |
|---|---|---|---|---|---|
| 1st place, gold medalist(s) | 3 | Ángela Tenorio | Ecuador | 11.47 | |
| 2nd place, silver medalist(s) | 4 | María Idrobo | Colombia | 11.72 | |
| 3rd place, bronze medalist(s) | 5 | Érika Chávez | Ecuador | 11.78 | |
| 4 | 8 | Eliecit Palacios | Colombia | 11.88 | |
| 5 | 7 | Lexabeth Hidalgo | Venezuela | 11.95 | |
| 6 | 6 | Andrea Purica | Venezuela | 11.98 | |
| 7 | 2 | Ruth Cassandra | Panama | 12.00 | |
| 8 | 1 | Paola Mautino | Peru | 12.24 | |

=== 200 meters ===
Heat 1 – 27 November – Wind: -0.7 m/s

| Rank | Lane | Name | Nationality | Time | Notes |
|---|---|---|---|---|---|
| 1 | 4 | Érika Chávez | Ecuador | 23.82 | Q |
| 2 | 3 | Darlenis Obregón | Colombia | 24.08 | Q |
| 3 | 5 | Wilmary Álvarez | Venezuela | 24.47 | Q |
| 4 | 7 | Mariana Trujillo | Bolivia | 26.47 | q |
| | 6 | Marcia Nazario | Peru | DNF | |

Heat 2 – 27 November – Wind: -1.5 m/s

| Rank | Lane | Name | Nationality | Time | Notes |
|---|---|---|---|---|---|
| 1 | 7 | Nercely Soto | Venezuela | 24.15 | Q |
| 2 | 4 | Ángela Tenorio | Ecuador | 24.30 | Q |
| 3 | 5 | Merlin Palacios | Colombia | 24.31 | Q |
| 4 | 6 | Paola Mautino | Peru | 25.48 | q |
| 5 | 3 | Leslie Arnéz | Bolivia | 27.07 | |

Final – 27 November – Wind: 0.0 m/s

| Rank | Lane | Name | Nationality | Time | Notes |
|---|---|---|---|---|---|
| 1st place, gold medalist(s) | 3 | Nercely Soto | Venezuela | 23.46 | |
| 2nd place, silver medalist(s) | 4 | Érika Chávez | Ecuador | 23.67 | |
| 3rd place, bronze medalist(s) | 6 | Ángela Tenorio | Ecuador | 23.68 | |
| 4 | 5 | Darlenis Obregón | Colombia | 23.78 | |
| 5 | 7 | Merlin Palacios | Colombia | 24.09 | |
| 6 | 8 | Wilmary Álvarez | Venezuela | 24.24 | |
| 7 | 1 | Mariana Trujillo | Bolivia | 26.47 | |
| | 2 | Paola Mautino | Peru | DNS | |

=== 400 meters ===
Heat 1 – 26 November

| Rank | Lane | Name | Nationality | Time | Notes |
|---|---|---|---|---|---|
| 1 | 5 | Celene Cevallos | Ecuador | 55.72 | Q |
| 2 | 4 | Yaneth Largacha | Colombia | 55.76 | Q |
| 3 | 6 | Emileth Pirela | Venezuela | 55.77 | Q |
| 4 | 7 | Deysi Parra | Peru | 57.66 | |
| 5 | 3 | Leslie Arnéz | Bolivia | 59.03 | |

Heat 2 – 26 November

| Rank | Lane | Name | Nationality | Time | Notes |
|---|---|---|---|---|---|
| 1 | 4 | Yenifer Padilla | Colombia | 53.10 | Q |
| 2 | 3 | Nercely Soto | Venezuela | 54.63 | Q |
| 3 | 5 | María Mackenna | Chile | 55.00 | Q |
| 4 | 6 | Maitte Torres | Peru | 55.40 | q |
| 5 | 7 | Nicole Minota | Ecuador | 56.57 | q |

Final – 26 November

| Rank | Lane | Name | Nationality | Time | Notes |
|---|---|---|---|---|---|
| 1st place, gold medalist(s) | 5 | Nercely Soto | Venezuela | 51.94 | GR |
| 2nd place, silver medalist(s) | 4 | Yenifer Padilla | Colombia | 52.43 | |
| 3rd place, bronze medalist(s) | 3 | Celene Cevallos | Ecuador | 53.75 | |
| 4 | 7 | María Mackenna | Chile | 54.99 | |
| 5 | 6 | Yaneth Largacha | Colombia | 55.10 | |
| 6 | 2 | Maitte Torres | Peru | 56.00 | |
| 7 | 8 | Emileth Pirela | Venezuela | 56.68 | |
| 8 | 1 | Nicole Minota | Ecuador | 57.32 | |

=== 800 meters ===
Final – 28 November

| Rank | Name | Nationality | Time | Notes |
|---|---|---|---|---|
| 1st place, gold medalist(s) | Rosibel García | Colombia | 2:01.98 | |
| 2nd place, silver medalist(s) | Andrea Ferris | Panama | 2:03.78 | |
| 3rd place, bronze medalist(s) | María Caballero | Paraguay | 2:06.38 | |
| 4 | Andrea Calderón | Ecuador | 2:07.61 | |
| 5 | Jenifer Méndez | Ecuador | 2:07.63 | |
| 6 | Soledad Torres | Peru | 2:09.37 | |
| 7 | Eliona Delgado | Peru | 2:16.64 | |

=== 1500 meters ===
Final – 26 November

| Rank | Name | Nationality | Time | Notes |
|---|---|---|---|---|
| 1st place, gold medalist(s) | Rosibel García | Colombia | 4:09.75 | GR, NR |
| 2nd place, silver medalist(s) | Muriel Coneo | Colombia | 4:09.79 | |
| 3rd place, bronze medalist(s) | Andrea Ferris | Panama | 4:15.22 | |
| 4 | María Caballero | Paraguay | 4:20.93 | |
| 5 | Zulema Arenas | Peru | 4:24.61 | |
| 6 | Eliona Delgado | Peru | 4:30.30 | |
| 7 | Silvia Paredes | Ecuador | 4:31.96 | |
| 8 | Helen Baltazar | Bolivia | 5:00.56 | |

=== 5000 meters ===
Final – 28 November

| Rank | Name | Nationality | Time | Notes |
|---|---|---|---|---|
| 1st place, gold medalist(s) | Inés Melchor | Peru | 15:30.63 | GR, NR |
| 2nd place, silver medalist(s) | Carolina Tabares | Colombia | 15:35.30 | |
| 3rd place, bronze medalist(s) | Wilma Arizapana | Peru | 15:55.70 | |
| 4 | Yolanda Caballero | Colombia | 16:53.70 | |
| 5 | Elida Hernández | Guatemala | 17:15.03 | |
| 6 | Yeisy Álvarez | Venezuela | 17:17.30 | |
| 7 | Helen Baltazar | Bolivia | 17:50.47 | |
| | Diana Landi | Ecuador | DNS | |

=== 10,000 meters ===
Final – 26 November

| Rank | Name | Nationality | Time | Notes |
|---|---|---|---|---|
| 1st place, gold medalist(s) | Inés Melchor | Peru | 33:52.9 | GR |
| 2nd place, silver medalist(s) | Wilma Arizapana | Peru | 33:55.5 | |
| 3rd place, bronze medalist(s) | Carolina Tabares | Colombia | 34:14.5 | |
| 4 | Diana Landi | Ecuador | 34:41.8 | |
| 5 | Elida Hernández | Guatemala | 36:15.8 | |
| 6 | Sonia Calizaya | Bolivia | 36:18.9 | |
| | Yolanda Caballero | Colombia | DNF | |
| | Jennifer González | Chile | DNF | |

=== Half marathon ===
Final – 30 November

| Rank | Name | Nationality | Time | Notes |
|---|---|---|---|---|
| 1st place, gold medalist(s) | Gladys Tejeda | Peru | 1:12:53 | GR |
| 2nd place, silver medalist(s) | Nicolasa Condori | Peru | 1:15:43 | |
| 3rd place, bronze medalist(s) | Érika Abril | Colombia | 1:16:54 | |
| 4 | Zuleima Amaya | Venezuela | 1:18:33 | |
| 5 | Vianca Pereira | Bolivia | 1:18:58 | |
| | Carmen Martínez | Paraguay | DNF | |
| | Rosmery Quispe | Bolivia | DNF | |

=== 100 meters hurdles ===
Heat 1 – 26 November – Wind: 0.2 m/s

| Rank | Lane | Name | Nationality | Time | Notes |
|---|---|---|---|---|---|
| 1 | 4 | Lina Flórez | Colombia | 13.46 | Q |
| 2 | 3 | Diana Bazalar | Peru | 13.67 | Q |
| 3 | 6 | Génesis Romero | Venezuela | 13.86 | Q |
| 4 | 5 | Ana Camila Pirelli | Paraguay | 13.99 | q |
| 5 | 2 | Adriana Lastra | Ecuador | 15.20 | |

Heat 2 – 26 November – Wind: 1.0 m/s

| Rank | Lane | Name | Nationality | Time | Notes |
|---|---|---|---|---|---|
| 1 | 4 | Briggite Merlano | Colombia | 13.36 | Q |
| 2 | 5 | Yvette Lewis | Panama | 13.61 | Q |
| 3 | 3 | Inara Cortez | Ecuador | 14.63 | Q |
| 4 | 6 | Hilma Riesco | Peru | 14.79 | q |

Final – 26 November – Wind: 0.1 m/s

| Rank | Lane | Name | Nationality | Time | Notes |
|---|---|---|---|---|---|
| 1st place, gold medalist(s) | 5 | Lina Flórez | Colombia | 13.12 | GR |
| 2nd place, silver medalist(s) | 4 | Yvette Lewis | Panama | 13.20 | |
| 3rd place, bronze medalist(s) | 3 | Briggite Merlano | Colombia | 13.60 | |
| 4 | 6 | Diana Bazalar | Peru | 13.78 | |
| 5 | 7 | Génesis Romero | Venezuela | 13.91 | |
| 6 | 2 | Ana Camila Pirelli | Paraguay | 14.15 | |
| 7 | 1 | Hilma Riesco | Peru | 14.97 | |
| 8 | 8 | Inara Cortez | Ecuador | 22.63 | |

=== 400 meters hurdles ===
Final – 28 November

| Rank | Lane | Name | Nationality | Time | Notes |
|---|---|---|---|---|---|
| 1st place, gold medalist(s) | 5 | Yadira Moreno | Colombia | 57.17 | GR |
| 2nd place, silver medalist(s) | 3 | Javiera Errázuriz | Chile | 57.80 | |
| 3rd place, bronze medalist(s) | 4 | Magdalena Mendoza | Venezuela | 57.86 | |
| 4 | 2 | Lina Flórez | Colombia | 58.91 | |
| 5 | 1 | Estefani Balladares | Venezuela | 1:01.29 | |
| 6 | 6 | Virginia Villalba | Ecuador | 1:01.59 | |
| 7 | 8 | Maitte Torres | Peru | 1:01.69 | |
| | 7 | Diana Bazalar | Peru | DNS | |

=== 3000 meters steeplechase ===
Final – 29 November

| Rank | Name | Nationality | Time | Notes |
|---|---|---|---|---|
| 1st place, gold medalist(s) | Muriel Coneo | Colombia | 10:00.09 | GR |
| 2nd place, silver medalist(s) | Ángela Figueroa | Colombia | 10:01.93 | |
| 3rd place, bronze medalist(s) | Andrea Ferris | Panama | 10:03.21 | |
| 4 | Cinthya Paucar | Peru | 10:04.04 | |
| 5 | Zulema Arenas | Peru | 10:05.53 | |
| 6 | Rolanda Bell | Panama | 10:11.17 | |
| 7 | Ana Marza | Bolivia | 11:03.98 | |
| 8 | Yeisy Álvarez | Venezuela | 11:11.97 | |
| | María Caballero | Paraguay | DNF | |

=== High jump ===
Final – 29 November

| Rank | Name | Nationality | 1.65 | 1.70 | 1.73 | 1.76 | 1.79 | 1.82 | Result | Notes |
|---|---|---|---|---|---|---|---|---|---|---|
| 1st place, gold medalist(s) | Kashani Ríos | Panama | O | O | O | O | XO | XXX | 1.79 | |
| 2nd place, silver medalist(s) | Yulimar Rojas | Venezuela | O | O | O | O | XXX | | 1.76 | |
| 3rd place, bronze medalist(s) | Gabriela Saravia | Peru | O | XXX | | | | | 1.65 | |

=== Pole vault ===
Final – 26 November

| Rank | Name | Nationality | 3.20 | 3.30 | 3.40 | 3.50 | 3.60 | 3.70 | 3.80 | 4.00 | 4.20 | 4.30 | 4.41 | Result | Notes |
|---|---|---|---|---|---|---|---|---|---|---|---|---|---|---|---|
| 1st place, gold medalist(s) | Robeilys Peinado | Venezuela | - | - | - | - | - | O | O | O | O | O | XXX | 4.30 | GR |
| 2nd place, silver medalist(s) | Giseth Montaño | Colombia | - | - | - | XX- | O | X- | XX | | | | | 3.60 | |
| 3rd place, bronze medalist(s) | Jéssica Fu | Peru | - | - | O | - | XXX | | | | | | | 3.40 | |
| 4 | Dayan Morales | Venezuela | - | XO | XO | XXX | | | | | | | | 3.40 | |
| 5 | Alejandra Arévalo | Peru | O | XXO | XO | XXX | | | | | | | | 3.40 | |

=== Long jump ===
Final – 28 November

| Rank | Name | Nationality | #1 | #2 | #3 | #4 | #5 | #6 | Result | Notes |
|---|---|---|---|---|---|---|---|---|---|---|
| 1st place, gold medalist(s) | Paola Mautino | Peru | 5.85 (0.9 m/s) | X | 5.60 w (2.4 m/s) | 5.85 w (2.6 m/s) | X | 6.32 (1.6 m/s) | 6.32 (1.6 m/s) | |
| 2nd place, silver medalist(s) | Munich Tovar | Venezuela | X | 6.08 (0.8 m/s) | 6.19 (1.9 m/s) | 6.12 w (2.5 m/s) | 6.20 (1.8 m/s) | X | 6.20 (1.8 m/s) | |
| 3rd place, bronze medalist(s) | Yosiris Urrutia | Colombia | 6.08 (1.5 m/s) | 4.96 w (5.1 m/s) | 5.96 w (2.6 m/s) | 5.86 (0.4 m/s) | 5.96 (1.9 m/s) | 6.10 w (2.3 m/s) | 6.10 w (2.3 m/s) | |
| 4 | Daniela Pávez | Chile | 5.92 (1.8 m/s) | 5.96 w (2.5 m/s) | 6.10 w (4.7 m/s) | 6.06 (0.6 m/s) | 6.03 w (3.2 m/s) | 5.41 w (2.5 m/s) | 6.10 w (4.7 m/s) | |
| 5 | Yuliana Angulo | Ecuador | X | 5.94 w (3.2 m/s) | 5.90 w (3.9 m/s) | 5.99 w (2.9 m/s) | 5.84 w (2.2 m/s) | 5.84 (2.0 m/s) | 5.99 w (2.9 m/s) | |
| 6 | Yulimar Rojas | Venezuela | 5.87 (-0.1 m/s) | 4.39 (0.8 m/s) | 2.45 (1.8 m/s) | - | - | - | 5.87 (-0.1 m/s) | |
| 7 | Lindy Cavero | Bolivia | X | X | 5.55 (1.1 m/s) | 5.78 w (3.1 m/s) | 5.69 w (3.5 m/s) | 5.59 (0.0 m/s) | 5.78 w (3.1 m/s) | |
| 8 | Alexa Morey | Peru | X | X | 5.56 w (5.9 m/s) | 5.38 w (2.6 m/s) | 5.37 w (3.8 m/s) | 5.59 w (4.2 m/s) | 5.59 w (4.2 m/s) | |
| 9 | Valeria Quispe | Bolivia | 5.48 w (3.6 m/s) | 5.17 (0.6 m/s) | 5.25 w (2.5 m/s) | | | | 5.48 w (3.6 m/s) | |
| 10 | Ana Camargo | Guatemala | 5.28 (0.7 m/s) | 4.77 (1.8 m/s) | 5.27 w (2.1 m/s) | | | | 5.28 (0.7 m/s) | |
| 11 | Mayra Chila | Ecuador | 5.23 w (3.5 m/s) | 5.25 w (3.3 m/s) | 5.27 (1.1 m/s) | | | | 5.27 (1.1 m/s) | |

=== Triple jump ===
Final – 27 November

| Rank | Name | Nationality | #1 | #2 | #3 | #4 | #5 | #6 | Result | Notes |
|---|---|---|---|---|---|---|---|---|---|---|
| 1st place, gold medalist(s) | Yosiris Urrutia | Colombia | 13.95 w (2.8 m/s) | 13.26 (1.9 m/s) | 13.66 (-0.1 m/s) | 14.08 (1.7 m/s) | 13.94 (1.1 m/s) | - | 14.08 (1.7 m/s) | GR |
| 2nd place, silver medalist(s) | Silvana Segura | Peru | 13.19 (1.7 m/s) | 13.05 w (2.2 m/s) | X | 12.86 w (2.3 m/s) | 13.29 (1.4 m/s) | 13.46 w (2.7 m/s) | 13.46 w (2.7 m/s) | |
| 3rd place, bronze medalist(s) | Giselly Landázury | Colombia | 12.86 (1.4 m/s) | 13.24 w (2.1 m/s) | 13.28 (1.5 m/s) | 13.29 (1.9 m/s) | X | 13.13 w (3.0 m/s) | 13.29 (1.9 m/s) | |
| 4 | Mirian Reyes | Peru | 13.04 (1.9 m/s) | 13.12 w (3.4 m/s) | X | 12.99 (2.0 m/s) | X | 13.15 (1.4 m/s) | 13.15 (1.4 m/s) | |
| 5 | Yudelsi González | Venezuela | 12.84 w (3.4 m/s) | 12.78 (2.0 m/s) | 12.90 (1.5 m/s) | 12.80 w (2.6 m/s) | 12.62 (0.4 m/s) | 12.77 w (2.5 m/s) | 12.90 (1.5 m/s) | |
| 6 | Mayra Pachito | Ecuador | 12.89 w (2.5 m/s) | 12.89 w (2.6 m/s) | 12.65 (0.9 m/s) | 11.94 w (2.4 m/s) | 12.54 (1.1 m/s) | 12.29 (0.4 m/s) | 12.89 w (2.6 m/s) | |
| 7 | Valeria Quispe | Bolivia | 12.39 (-0.5 m/s) | 12.62 w (2.8 m/s) | 12.47 w (2.7 m/s) | 11.99 w (2.6 m/s) | X | 12.10 (1.7 m/s) | 12.62 w (2.8 m/s) | |
| 8 | Ana Camargo | Guatemala | X | X | 12.02 w (2.4 m/s) | X | X | 12.06 w (2.6 m/s) | 12.06 w (2.6 m/s) | |
| 9 | Mayra Chila | Ecuador | X | X | 11.50 (1.5 m/s) | | | | 11.50 (1.5 m/s) | |

=== Shot put ===
Final – 26 November

| Rank | Name | Nationality | #1 | #2 | #3 | #4 | #5 | #6 | Result | Notes |
|---|---|---|---|---|---|---|---|---|---|---|
| 1st place, gold medalist(s) | Ahymará Espinoza | Venezuela | X | X | 17.37 | 18.15 | 17.44 | X | 18.15 | GR |
| 2nd place, silver medalist(s) | Sandra Lemos | Colombia | 16.57 | 16.24 | 17.26 | 17.45 | X | 16.79 | 17.45 | |
| 3rd place, bronze medalist(s) | Ivana Gallardo | Chile | X | 13.86 | 15.14 | 16.01 | 14.52 | 14.90 | 16.01 | |
| 4 | Grace Conley | Bolivia | 14.71 | 12.89 | X | 12.51 | 13.12 | X | 14.71 | |
| 5 | Giohanny Rojas | Venezuela | 14.64 | X | 14.07 | X | X | X | 14.64 | |

=== Discus throw ===
Final – 27 November

| Rank | Name | Nationality | #1 | #2 | #3 | #4 | #5 | #6 | Result | Notes |
|---|---|---|---|---|---|---|---|---|---|---|
| 1st place, gold medalist(s) | Karen Gallardo | Chile | 53.43 | 53.63 | 51.63 | 52.72 | 52.77 | 56.77 | 56.77 | GR |
| 2nd place, silver medalist(s) | Johanna Martínez | Colombia | 53.29 | 51.17 | 52.84 | 52.78 | 52.85 | 52.18 | 53.29 | |
| 3rd place, bronze medalist(s) | Aixa Middleton | Panama | 51.81 | X | 49.40 | 50.86 | 51.94 | X | 51.94 | |
| 4 | Ivana Gallardo | Chile | 47.13 | X | X | 45.79 | 42.87 | 48.61 | 48.61 | |
| 5 | Elizabeth Álvarez | Venezuela | X | X | X | 45.60 | 48.39 | X | 48.39 | |
| 6 | Fátima Ramos | Peru | X | X | 36.93 | 36.90 | 38.22 | X | 38.22 | |
| 7 | Sofía Gutiérrez | Peru | X | 35.12 | X | X | 34.43 | X | 35.12 | |

=== Hammer throw ===
Final – 29 November

| Rank | Name | Nationality | #1 | #2 | #3 | #4 | #5 | #6 | Result | Notes |
|---|---|---|---|---|---|---|---|---|---|---|
| 1st place, gold medalist(s) | Rosa Rodríguez | Venezuela | 70.29 | 72.71 | X | 73.36 | X | 71.52 | 73.36 | GR |
| 2nd place, silver medalist(s) | Johana Moreno | Colombia | 66.50 | 65.74 | 62.77 | 65.67 | X | 66.59 | 66.59 | |
| 3rd place, bronze medalist(s) | Zuleima Mina | Ecuador | X | 58.31 | 61.05 | 61.88 | 60.54 | 58.71 | 61.88 | |
| 4 | Odette Palma | Chile | 57.80 | 59.12 | 60.53 | 60.41 | 60.36 | 57.00 | 60.53 | |
| 5 | Génesis Olivera | Venezuela | X | 59.12 | 57.21 | X | 57.92 | X | 59.12 | |
| 6 | Valeria Chiliquinga | Ecuador | 57.65 | 56.55 | 57.81 | 58.76 | 58.69 | 58.12 | 58.76 | |
| 7 | Fátima Ramos | Peru | 54.82 | 55.60 | 55.64 | 55.89 | 56.33 | 55.20 | 56.33 | |
| 8 | Rosa Enríquez | Peru | 51.51 | 50.23 | X | 48.63 | X | 49.18 | 51.51 | |
| 9 | Sabrina Gaitán | Guatemala | 48.93 | 47.91 | X | | | | 48.93 | |

=== Javelin throw ===
Final – 26 November

| Rank | Name | Nationality | #1 | #2 | #3 | #4 | #5 | #6 | Result | Notes |
|---|---|---|---|---|---|---|---|---|---|---|
| 1st place, gold medalist(s) | Flor Ruiz | Colombia | 55.78 | 54.92 | 58.18 | X | 54.61 | 56.20 | 58.18 | GR |
| 2nd place, silver medalist(s) | María Lucelly Murillo | Colombia | 50.18 | 55.98 | 53.46 | X | X | X | 55.98 | |
| 3rd place, bronze medalist(s) | Ayra Valdivia | Peru | 41.48 | 47.58 | 43.01 | X | - | - | 47.58 | |
| 4 | Nadia Requena | Peru | 46.88 | 44.10 | 45.52 | 45.13 | X | 44.83 | 46.88 | |
| 5 | Estefany Chacón | Venezuela | 43.65 | 45.88 | X | 43.20 | - | - | 45.88 | |
| 6 | Denisse Vargas | Ecuador | 39.65 | 40.57 | 45.57 | X | 42.18 | 44.88 | 45.57 | |
| | Ana Camila Pirelli | Paraguay | | | | | | | DNS | |

=== Heptathlon ===
Final – 28/29 November

The highest mark recorded in each event is highlighted in yellow

| Rank | Name | Nationality | 100m H | HJ | SP | 200m | LJ | JT | 800m | Points | Notes |
|---|---|---|---|---|---|---|---|---|---|---|---|
| 1st place, gold medalist(s) | Ana Camila Pirelli | Paraguay | 13.96 (0.3 m/s); 984 | 1.67 818 | 13.36 751 | 25.11 (0.9 m/s); 877 | 5.48 (0.0 m/s); 694 | 42.72 720 | 2:15.28 889 | 5733 | |
| 2nd place, silver medalist(s) | Guillercy González | Venezuela | 14.76 (0.3 m/s); 874 | 1.82 1003 | 11.79 647 | 25.90 (-0.1 m/s); 806 | 5.47 (0.9 m/s); 691 | 36.37 598 | 2:21.33 806 | 5425 | |
| 3rd place, bronze medalist(s) | Carolina Castillo | Chile | 14.27 (0.3 m/s); 941 | 1.67 818 | 10.25 546 | 25.59 (0.9 m/s); 833 | 5.71 (0.0 m/s); 762 | 31.13 498 | 2:20.55 816 | 5214 | |
| 4 | Melissa Arana | Peru | 15.47 (0.3 m/s); 781 | 1.61 747 | 10.66 573 | 26.62 (-0.1 m/s); 744 | 5.45 (1.5 m/s); 686 | 38.29 635 | 2:23.20 781 | 4947 | |
| 5 | Nelsibeth Villalobos | Venezuela | 14.15 (0.3 m/s); 957 | 1.49 610 | 9.47 495 | 24.52 (0.9 m/s); 931 | 5.59 (0.4 m/s); 726 | 32.57 525 | 2:39.73 576 | 4820 | |
| 6 | Nasli Perea | Colombia | 14.89 (0.3 m/s); 856 | 1.61 747 | 11.73 643 | 27.26 (-0.1 m/s); 690 | 5.22 (0.0 m/s); 620 | 34.79 568 | 2:38.66 588 | 4712 | |
| 7 | Jennifer Canchingre | Ecuador | 16.31 (0.3 m/s); 677 | 1.52 644 | 9.53 499 | 27.21 (-0.1 m/s); 694 | 5.16 (0.5 m/s); 603 | 32.29 520 | 2:41.23 559 | 4196 | |
| 8 | Romina Montes | Peru | 14.75 (0.3 m/s); 875 | 1.61 747 | 9.85 520 | 27.26 (0.9 m/s); 690 | 5.46 (0.2 m/s); 688 | 21.35 314 | 3:12.15 261 | 4095 | |
| 9 | Denisse Vargas | Ecuador | 17.46 (0.3 m/s); 546 | 1.46 577 | 10.92 590 | 27.84 (0.9 m/s); 643 | - 0 | 40.66 680 | 2:55.44 409 | 3445 | |

=== 20 kilometers walk ===
Final – 28 November

| Rank | Name | Nationality | Time | Notes |
|---|---|---|---|---|
| 1st place, gold medalist(s) | Mirna Ortiz | Guatemala | 1:34:07 | GR |
| 2nd place, silver medalist(s) | Sandra Arenas | Colombia | 1:34:23 | |
| 3rd place, bronze medalist(s) | Kimberly García | Peru | 1:34:29 | |
| 4 | Sandra Galvis | Colombia | 1:34:55 | |
| 5 | Ángela Castro | Bolivia | 1:35:58 | |
| 6 | Paola Pérez | Ecuador | 1:36:51 | |
| 7 | Magaly Bonilla | Ecuador | 1:37:07 | |
| 8 | Mayra Herrera | Guatemala | 1:40:05 | |
| 9 | Milangela Rosales | Venezuela | 1:40:46 | |
| 10 | Jessica Hancco | Peru | 1:48:42 | |
| | Wendy Cornejo | Bolivia | DNF | |

=== 4 x 100 meters relay ===
Final – 28 November

| Rank | Lane | Nation | Competitors | Time | Notes |
|---|---|---|---|---|---|
| 1st place, gold medalist(s) | 4 | Colombia | Yomara Hinestroza; María Alejandra Idrobo; Darlenys Obregón; Eliecith Palacios | 43.90 | |
| 2nd place, silver medalist(s) | 5 | Venezuela | Lexabeth Hidalgo; Wilmary Álvarez; Nedian Vargas; Nercely Soto | 44.16 | |
| 3rd place, bronze medalist(s) | 3 | Ecuador | Narcisa Landázuri; Érika Chávez; Celene Cevallos; Ángela Tenorio | 44.29 | |
| 4 | 6 | Chile | Daniela Pávez; Isidora Jiménez; María Mackenna; Viviana Olivares | 45.31 | |
| 5 | 2 | Peru | Gabriela Delgado; Diana Bazalar; Marcia Nazario; Paola Mautino | 46.67 | |

=== 4 x 400 meters relay ===
Final – 29 November

| Rank | Lane | Nation | Competitors | Time | Notes |
|---|---|---|---|---|---|
| 1st place, gold medalist(s) | 4 | Colombia | Yadira Moreno; Rosibel García; Lina Flórez; Jennifer Padilla | 3:34.35 | GR |
| 2nd place, silver medalist(s) | 3 | Venezuela | Wilmary Álvarez; Emileth Pirela; Magdalena Mendoza; Maryuri Valdez | 3:40.49 | |
| 3rd place, bronze medalist(s) | 5 | Chile | Isidora Jiménez; Carolina Castillo; Javiera Errázuriz; María Mackenna | 3:41.74 | |
| 4 | 6 | Ecuador | Nicole Minota; Jenifer Méndez; Andrea Calderón; Celene Cevallos | 3:46.13 | |
| 5 | 7 | Peru | Jimena Copara; Claudia Meneses; Deysi Parra; Maitte Torres | 3:49.76 | |
