= Athletics at the 2014 South American Games – Results =

These are the full results of the athletics competition at the 2014 South American Games which took place between March 13 and March 16, 2014 in Santiago, Chile.

== Men's results ==
=== 100 meters ===
Heats – March 14
Wind:
Heat 1: +1.0 m/s, Heat 2: +1.1 m/s

Rank	Heat	Name	Nationality	Time	Notes
1	2	Alonso Edward	Panama	10.29	Q
2	1	Jefferson Lucindo	Brazil	10.35	Q
3	1	Álex Quiñónez	Ecuador	10.43	Q
4	2	Enrique Polanco	Chile	10.51	Q
5	1	Dubeiker Cedeño	Venezuela	10.60	Q
6	1	Ifrish Alberg	Suriname	10.64	q
7	1	Luis Rentería	Colombia	10.64	q
8	1	Andy Martínez	Peru	10.65	PB
9	2	Álvaro Cassiani	Venezuela	10.67	Q
10	2	Vladimir Valencia	Colombia	10.69	
11	1	Franklin Nazareno	Ecuador	10.81	
	2	Andrés Rodrigues	Panama	DNF	
	2	José Carlos Moreira	Brazil	DQ	FS
	2	Franco Boccardo	Chile	DNS	

Final – March 14
Wind:
+1.1 m/s

Rank	Lane	Name	Nationality	Time	Notes
1st place, gold medalist(s)	5	Alonso Edward	Panama	10.23	GR
2nd place, silver medalist(s)	4	Jefferson Lucindo	Brazil	10.30	
3rd place, bronze medalist(s)	3	Álex Quiñónez	Ecuador	10.39	
4	6	Enrique Polanco	Chile	10.58	
5	2	Ifrish Alberg	Suriname	10.59	
6	8	Álvaro Cassiani	Venezuela	10.60	
7	7	Dubeiker Cedeño	Venezuela	10.64	
8	1	Luis Rentería	Colombia	10.75	

=== 200 meters ===
Heats – March 15
Wind:
Heat 1: -0.1 m/s, Heat 2: -1.9 m/s

Rank	Heat	Name	Nationality	Time	Notes
1	1	Bruno de Barros	Brazil	20.80	Q
2	2	Aldemir da Silva Junior	Brazil	20.93	Q
3	1	Winston George	Guyana	21.01	Q
4	2	Álex Quiñónez	Ecuador	21.11	Q
5	2	Arturo Ramírez	Venezuela	21.12	Q, PB
6	1	Andy Martínez	Peru	21.37	Q, PB
7	1	Álvaro Cassiani	Venezuela	21.49	q
8	1	Daniel Grueso	Colombia	21.55	q
9	1	Nicolas Dagnino	Chile	21.83	
10	2	Ifrish Alberg	Suriname	21.93	
11	2	Vladimir Valencia	Colombia	21.99	
12	1	Jhon Valencia	Ecuador	22.09	
13	2	Sergio Aldea	Chile	22.21	
	1	Arturo Deliser	Panama	DNF	
	2	Andrés Rodrigues	Panama	DNS	
	2	Bruno Rojas	Bolivia	DNS	

Final – March 15
Wind:
-1.0 m/s

Rank	Lane	Name	Nationality	Time	Notes
1st place, gold medalist(s)	6	Aldemir da Silva Junior	Brazil	20.32	GR, WL
2nd place, silver medalist(s)	5	Álex Quiñónez	Ecuador	20.66	
3rd place, bronze medalist(s)	7	Arturo Ramírez	Venezuela	20.67	PB
4	4	Bruno de Barros	Brazil	20.77	
5	3	Winston George	Guyana	20.77	
6	8	Andy Martínez	Peru	21.35	PB
7	1	Álvaro Cassiani	Venezuela	21.36	
	2	Daniel Grueso	Colombia	DNS	

=== 400 meters ===
Heats – March 13

Rank	Heat	Name	Nationality	Time	Notes
1	1	Anderson Henriques	Brazil	45.57	Q
2	2	Jhon Perlaza	Colombia	46.54	Q
3	1	Winston George	Guyana	46.57	Q
4	2	Freddy Mezones	Venezuela	46.83	Q
5	1	Alberto Aguilar	Venezuela	46.91	Q
6	1	Carlos Andrés Lemos	Colombia	47.28	q
7	2	Hugo de Sousa	Brazil	47.63	Q
8	1	Sergio Germain	Chile	48.35	q
9	2	Emerson Chalá	Ecuador	48.36	
10	2	Javier Vivar	Chile	48.77	
11	2	Wayne Harlequin	Guyana	49.14	
	1	Bruno Rojas	Bolivia	DNS	

Final – March 14

Rank	Lane	Name	Nationality	Time	Notes
1st place, gold medalist(s)	3	Anderson Henriques	Brazil	45.03	GR, WL
2nd place, silver medalist(s)	8	Hugo de Sousa	Brazil	45.09	PB
3rd place, bronze medalist(s)	5	Freddy Mezones	Venezuela	45.86	
4	4	Winston George	Guyana	46.15	
5	6	Jhon Perlaza	Colombia	46.42	
6	7	Alberto Aguilar	Venezuela	47.03	
7	2	Carlos Andrés Lemos	Colombia	47.07	
8	1	Sergio Germain	Chile	47.90	

=== 800 meters ===
March 16

Rank	Name	Nationality	Time	Notes
1st place, gold medalist(s)	Kléberson Davide	Brazil	1:45.30	GR, WL
2nd place, silver medalist(s)	Rafith Rodríguez	Colombia	1:45.39	
3rd place, bronze medalist(s)	Lutimar Paes	Brazil	1:47.52	
4	Jhon Sinisterra	Colombia	1:49.48	
5	Aquiles Zúñiga	Chile	1:50.34	
6	Alejandro Peirano	Chile	1:50.43	
7	Willian García	Peru	1:52.55	
8	Alex Cisneros	Ecuador	1:53.42	
9	Wayne Harlequin	Guyana	1:55.88	
10	Cleveland Thomas	Guyana	1:57.90	

=== 1500 meters ===
March 14

Rank	Name	Nationality	Time	Notes
1st place, gold medalist(s)	Federico Bruno	Argentina	3:39.96	GR, PB
2nd place, silver medalist(s)	Iván López	Chile	3:42.62	
3rd place, bronze medalist(s)	Rafith Rodríguez	Colombia	3:42.75	NR
4	Carlos Díaz	Chile	3:43.22	
5	Joilson da Silva	Brazil	3:45.47	
6	Freddy Espinosa	Colombia	3:47.01	
7	Alex Cisneros	Ecuador	3:53.59	
8	Cleveland Thomas	Guyana	4:02.20	
9	Cleveland Forde	Guyana	4:02.36	
	Lutimar Paes	Brazil	DNF	

=== 5000 meters ===
March 16

Rank	Name	Nationality	Time	Notes
1st place, gold medalist(s)	Víctor Aravena	Chile	14:06.02	
2nd place, silver medalist(s)	Joilson da Silva	Brazil	14:07.77	
3rd place, bronze medalist(s)	Javier Carriqueo	Argentina	14:11.41	
4	Federico Bruno	Argentina	14:11.55	
5	Bayron Piedra	Ecuador	14:15.49	
6	Iván López	Chile	14:23.33	
7	Daniel Toroya	Bolivia	14:58.66	
8	Cleveland Forde	Guyana	15:19.69	
	José Peña	Venezuela	DNF	

=== 10,000 meters ===
March 13

Rank	Name	Nationality	Time	Notes
1st place, gold medalist(s)	Bayron Piedra	Ecuador	28:48.31	GR, SB
2nd place, silver medalist(s)	Giovani dos Santos	Brazil	28:53.90	
3rd place, bronze medalist(s)	Diego Colorado	Colombia	29:10.75	
4	Leslie Encina	Chile	29:31.91	
5	Víctor Aravena	Chile	30:15.57	
	Miguel Almachi	Ecuador	DNF	
	Javier Carriqueo	Argentina	DNF	
	Gerard Giraldo	Colombia	DNF	

=== 110 meters hurdles ===
Heats – March 14
Wind:
Heat 1: -1.3 m/s, Heat 2: -1.6 m/s

Rank	Heat	Name	Nationality	Time	Notes
1	1	Jonathan Mendes	Brazil	13.94	Q
2	1	Jorge McFarlane	Peru	13.97	Q
3	2	Agustín Carrera	Argentina	14.06	Q
4	2	Javier McFarlane	Peru	14.10	Q
5	2	Matheus Facho Inocêncio	Brazil	14.15	Q
6	1	Yeison Rivas	Colombia	14.32	Q
7	1	David Franco	Venezuela	14.35	q, PB
8	2	Jhon Tamayo	Ecuador	14.47	q
9	1	Diego Lyon	Chile	14.67	
10	2	Patricio Colarte	Chile	15.46	

Final – March 14
Wind:
+0.5 m/s

Rank	Lane	Name	Nationality	Time	Notes
1st place, gold medalist(s)	6	Javier McFarlane	Peru	13.77	PB
2nd place, silver medalist(s)	5	Jonathan Mendes	Brazil	13.81	
3rd place, bronze medalist(s)	3	Jorge McFarlane	Peru	13.83	
4	4	Agustín Carrera	Argentina	13.86	
5	8	Matheus Facho Inocêncio	Brazil	13.93	
6	1	Jhon Tamayo	Ecuador	14.27	SB
7	2	David Franco	Venezuela	14.28	PB
8	7	Yeison Rivas	Colombia	14.29	

=== 400 meters hurdles ===
March 15

Rank	Lane	Name	Nationality	Time	Notes
1st place, gold medalist(s)	8	Andrés Silva	Uruguay	49.57	GR, WL
2nd place, silver medalist(s)	5	Lucirio Francisco Garrido	Venezuela	49.66	PB
3rd place, bronze medalist(s)	7	Mahau Suguimati	Brazil	50.47	
4	6	Gustavo Gutiérrez	Chile	51.98	
5	2	Artur Terezan	Brazil	52.45	
6	4	Alfredo Sepúlveda	Chile	52.68	
	3	Emerson Chalá	Ecuador	DNF	

=== 3000 meters steeplechase ===
March 16

Rank	Name	Nationality	Time	Notes
1st place, gold medalist(s)	José Peña	Venezuela	8:36.81	GR, WL
2nd place, silver medalist(s)	Gerard Giraldo	Colombia	8:45.96	
3rd place, bronze medalist(s)	Mariano Mastromarino	Argentina	8:48.11	SB
4	Mauricio Valdivia	Chile	8:50.49	
5	Mauricio Franco	Colombia	8:55.88	
6	Daniel Estrada	Chile	8:58.36	
7	Gládson Barbosa	Brazil	8:58.80	
8	Rúben Toroya	Bolivia	9:23.78	

=== 4 x 100 meters relay ===
March 15

Rank	Lane	Nation	Competitors	Time	Notes
1st place, gold medalist(s)	4	Brazil	Ailson Feitosa, Jefferson Lucindo, Aldemir da Silva Junior, Bruno de Barros	38.90	GR
2nd place, silver medalist(s)	7	Venezuela	Dubeiker Cedeño, Arturo Ramírez, Álvaro Cassiani, Jermaine Chirinos	39.85	
3rd place, bronze medalist(s)	8	Colombia	Yeison Rivas, Vladimir Valencia, Daniel Grueso, Jorge Luis Rentería	40.26	
4	6	Chile	Sebastián Valdivia, Enrique Polanco, Nicolás Correa, Ignacio Rojas	40.30	
5	3	Ecuador	Luis Morán, Jhon Valencia, Franklin Nazareno, Álex Quiñónez	40.41	
	5	Panama		DNS	

=== 4 x 400 meters relay ===
March 16

Rank	Nation	Competitors	Time	Notes
1st place, gold medalist(s)	Brazil	Hugo de Sousa, Kléberson Davide, Ailson Feitosa, Anderson Henriques	3:03.94	GR
2nd place, silver medalist(s)	Venezuela	Noel Campos, Arturo Ramírez, José Meléndez, Freddy Mezones	3:04.17	
3rd place, bronze medalist(s)	Colombia	Jhon Perlaza, Jhon Sinisterra, Carlos Lemos, Rafith Rodríguez	3:10.15	
4	Chile	Nicolás Correa, Alfredo Sepúlveda, Sergio Germain, Javier Vivar	3:16.98	
	Ecuador		DNS	

=== 20,000 meters walk ===
March 15

Rank	Name	Nationality	Time	Notes
1st place, gold medalist(s)	Éider Arévalo	Colombia	1:22:11.1	GR, WL
2nd place, silver medalist(s)	José Leonardo Montaña	Colombia	1:22:14.1	SB
3rd place, bronze medalist(s)	Mauricio Arteaga	Ecuador	1:23:19.3	SB
4	Richard Vargas	Venezuela	1:24:11.4	
5	Yerko Araya	Chile	1:24:13.8	
6	Juan Manuel Cano	Argentina	1:24:45.0	
7	Marco Antonio Rodríguez	Bolivia	1:26:36.6	SB
	Edward Araya	Chile	DQ	
	Andrés Chocho	Ecuador	DQ	
	Ronald Quispe	Bolivia	DQ	
	Moacir Zimmermann	Brazil	DQ	

=== High jump ===
March 15

Rank	Name	Nationality	1.90	1.95	2.00	2.05	2.10	2.15	2.18	2.21	2.25	Result	Notes
1st place, gold medalist(s)	Eure Yánez	Venezuela	–	–	–	–	o	o	xo	xo	xx–	2.21	
2nd place, silver medalist(s)	Arturo Chávez	Peru	–	–	–	o	xxo	xo	o	xxx		2.18	
3rd place, bronze medalist(s)	Carlos Layoy	Argentina	–	–	o	–	o	xo	xo	xxx		2.18	
3rd place, bronze medalist(s)	Rafael dos Santos	Brazil	–	–	–	o	o	xo	xo	xxx		2.18	
5	Rodrigo Arriagada	Chile	o	xo	o	xo	xxx					2.05	SB
	Guilherme Cobbo	Brazil										DNS	

=== Pole vault ===
March 13

Rank	Name	Nationality	4.70	4.80	4.90	5.00	5.10	5.20	5.30	5.35	5.40	5.45	Result	Notes
1st place, gold medalist(s)	Augusto Dutra da Silva	Brazil	–	–	–	–	–	–	–	–	xo	–	5.40	
2nd place, silver medalist(s)	Germán Chiaraviglio	Argentina	–	–	–	–	–	o	–	xxo	–	xxx	5.35	
3rd place, bronze medalist(s)	Gonzalo Barroilhet	Chile	–	–	–	xo	–	o	–	xxx			5.20	
4	Rubén Benítez	Argentina	–	o	–	o	xxx						5.00	
5	Felipe Fuentes	Chile	xxo	–	xxx								4.70	
	Thiago Braz da Silva	Brazil	–	–	–	–	–	xxx					NM	
	José Rodolfo Pacho	Ecuador	xxx										NM	
	Ricardo Herrada	Venezuela											DNS	

=== Long jump ===
March 14

Rank	Name	Nationality	#1	#2	#3	#4	#5	#6	Result	Notes
1st place, gold medalist(s)	Irving Saladino	Panama	7.68	7.69	7.99	8.16	7.98	7.92	8.16	GR, WL
2nd place, silver medalist(s)	Emiliano Lasa	Uruguay	7.43	7.43	x	7.32	7.80	7.94	7.94	SB
3rd place, bronze medalist(s)	Mauro Vinícius da Silva	Brazil	7.84	x	7.79	7.88	x	7.72	7.88	
4	Daniel Pineda	Chile	7.51	7.76	7.50	7.82	x	7.73	7.82	
5	Javier McFarlane	Peru	6.45	7.15	7.55	7.62	7.47	x	7.62	
6	Higor Alves	Brazil	7.54	x	7.51	7.55	7.42	x	7.55	
7	Jorge McFarlane	Peru	x	7.52	7.48	x	7.50	7.53	7.53	
8	Álvaro Cortez	Chile	7.27	x	7.30	7.43	7.41	7.36	7.43	
9	Jhon Murillo	Colombia	7.23	7.19	x				7.23	
10	Miguel van Assen	Suriname	7.20	7.11	6.89				7.20	
11	Santiago Cova	Venezuela	7.10	6.96	6.81				7.10	
12	Quincy Breell	Aruba	x	6.90	6.69				6.90	
13	Dave Pika	Suriname	6.75	6.59	6.62				6.75	
	Diego Hernández	Venezuela							DNS	

=== Triple jump ===
March 16

Rank	Name	Nationality	#1	#2	#3	#4	#5	#6	Result	Notes
1st place, gold medalist(s)	Jonathan Henrique Silva	Brazil	16.01	16.05	16.25	16.13	16.51	16.06	16.51	GR
2nd place, silver medalist(s)	Jefferson Sabino	Brazil	16.02	16.04	16.12	15.65	16.44	16.41	16.44	
3rd place, bronze medalist(s)	Jhon Murillo	Colombia	15.84	x	16.27	15.95	x	x	16.27	
4	Miguel van Assen	Suriname	15.54	15.48	14.69	15.38	15.38	14.80	15.54	PB
5	Álvaro Cortez	Chile	x	x	15.50	15.51	15.48	15.44	15.51	
6	Maximiliano Díaz	Argentina	15.39	15.22	x	14.25	x	x	15.39	
7	Dave Pika	Suriname	15.21	14.58	14.73	x	–	x	15.21	PB
8	Yender Cardona	Venezuela	x	x	14.81	15.05	14.77	15.06	15.06	
9	Alejandro Horn	Chile	x	x	14.31				14.31	

=== Shot put ===
March 15

Rank	Name	Nationality	#1	#2	#3	#4	#5	#6	Result	Notes
1st place, gold medalist(s)	Germán Lauro	Argentina	20.35	20.59	x	x	20.55	20.70	20.70	GR, WL
2nd place, silver medalist(s)	Darlan Romani	Brazil	18.98	18.22	19.26	19.96	19.14	19.47	19.96	
3rd place, bronze medalist(s)	Aldo González	Bolivia	17.20	17.70	17.72	18.15	x	x	18.15	
4	Willian Braido	Brazil	16.92	17.33	17.44	17.39	17.53	16.99	17.53	
5	Maximiliano Alonso	Chile	16.79	17.04	17.47	x	17.52	x	17.52	
	Nicolás Laso	Chile	x	x	x	x	x	x	NM	
	Juan José Caicedo	Ecuador	x	–	–	–	–	–	DNF	
	Eder Moreno	Colombia							DNS	

=== Discus throw ===
March 16

Rank	Name	Nationality	#1	#2	#3	#4	#5	#6	Result	Notes
1st place, gold medalist(s)	Mauricio Ortega	Colombia	59.23	57.88	58.91	59.95	59.67	58.58	59.95	GR, NR
2nd place, silver medalist(s)	Ronald Julião	Brazil	53.83	57.33	x	57.38	56.64	59.12	59.12	
3rd place, bronze medalist(s)	Germán Lauro	Argentina	x	57.78	58.36	58.09	53.76	x	58.36	
4	Andrés Rossini	Argentina	53.81	55.51	55.62	56.08	x	53.97	56.08	
5	Jesús Parejo	Venezuela	x	51.81	51.41	55.06	50.50	x	55.06	PB
6	Juan José Caicedo	Ecuador	x	x	54.33	x	x	54.09	54.33	SB
7	Maximiliano Alonso	Chile	53.07	x	x	x	53.88	x	53.88	
8	Nicolás Laso	Chile	52.16	x	52.43	x	x	x	52.43	SB
9	Rodolfo Casanova	Uruguay	47.51	48.29	48.05				48.29	
	Gustavo Mendonça	Brazil	x	x	x				NM	

=== Hammer throw ===
March 14

Rank	Name	Nationality	#1	#2	#3	#4	#5	#6	Result	Notes
1st place, gold medalist(s)	Wagner Domingos	Brazil	x	66.81	70.62	x	69.16	x	70.62	
2nd place, silver medalist(s)	Roberto Sáez	Chile	66.54	66.47	x	65.37	x	67.38	67.38	
3rd place, bronze medalist(s)	Juan Ignacio Cerra	Argentina	65.97	66.34	65.05	65.88	66.04	63.86	66.34	
4	Pedro Muñoz	Venezuela	x	66.00	64.81	64.03	64.98	x	66.00	
5	Fabián Di Paolo	Argentina	64.97	63.29	x	x	62.39	63.39	64.97	
6	Humberto Mansilla	Chile	59.31	62.85	63.92	63.73	63.96	x	63.96	
7	Allan Wolski	Brazil	62.90	x	x	61.30	x	61.36	62.90	
8	Jacobo de Leon	Colombia	60.81	x	60.87	61.87	x	60.50	61.87	
	Guillermo Braulio	Ecuador	x	x	–				DNF	

=== Javelin throw ===
March 13

Rank	Name	Nationality	#1	#2	#3	#4	#5	#6	Result	Notes
1st place, gold medalist(s)	Víctor Fatecha	Paraguay	76.09	74.75	73.18	73.61	x	x	76.09	
2nd place, silver medalist(s)	Júlio César de Oliveira	Brazil	70.81	73.56	74.09	74.98	75.98	63.53	75.98	
3rd place, bronze medalist(s)	Dayron Márquez	Colombia	75.11	73.25	72.84	74.48	72.69	x	75.11	
4	Arley Ibargüen	Colombia	68.97	70.56	70.78	74.25	72.40	x	74.25	
5	Braian Toledo	Argentina	72.52	67.80	x	x	65.14	67.16	72.52	
6	Fabián Jara	Paraguay	67.60	71.57	72.35	69.07	67.92	70.94	72.35	SB
7	Ignacio Guerra	Chile	71.04	70.93	63.81	69.58	x	68.25	71.04	
8	Tomás Guerra	Chile	67.58	x	64.42	65.63	69.63	70.55	70.55	
9	Paulo Enrique da Silva	Brazil	64.61	66.38	66.85				66.85	

=== Decathlon ===
March 14–15

The highest mark recorded in each event is highlighted in yellow

Rank	Athlete	Nationality	100m	LJ	SP	HJ	400m	110m H	DT	PV	JT	1500m	Points	Notes
1st place, gold medalist(s)	Luiz Alberto de Araújo	Brazil	10.88	7.31	15.07	1.82	50.42	14.45	43.37	4.80	54.35	4:57.83	7733	GR
2nd place, silver medalist(s)	Gonzalo Barroilhet	Chile	11.34	6.86	13.86	2.00	52.94	14.22	47.63	5.10	52.35	5:08.50	7617	
3rd place, bronze medalist(s)	Guillermo Ruggeri	Argentina	10.91	6.88	13.00	1.91	47.88	14.64	37.99	3.80	50.30	4:44.21	7298	PB
4	Ricardo Herrada	Venezuela	11.38	6.63	12.10	1.88	51.18	14.96	36.83	4.50	51.40	4:45.48	7043	
5	Matías Dallaserra	Chile	11.17	6.58	13.53	1.85	51.24	15.96	37.32	4.20	40.59	4:33.88	6857	SB
6	José Lemos	Colombia	11.68	6.30	15.97	1.76	53.44	15.54	47.63	3.00	65.47	5:42.69	6594	
7	Gayell Engeso	Suriname	11.49	7.21	11.96	1.85	53.06	15.53	34.42	3.70	42.72	4:53.46	6526	SB
	Román Gastaldi	Argentina	10.95	7.05	14.02	1.94	50.28	DNS	–	–	–	–	DNF	
	Óscar Campos	Venezuela	11.20	6.43	12.72	NM	DNS	–	–	–	–	–	DNF	

== Women's results ==
=== 100 meters ===
Heats – March 14
Wind:
Heat 1: -0.8 m/s, Heat 2: -0.6 m/s

Rank	Heat	Name	Nationality	Time	Notes
1	1	Franciela Krasucki	Brazil	11.53	Q
2	2	Ángela Tenorio	Ecuador	11.72	Q
3	2	Erika Chávez	Ecuador	11.74	Q
4	1	María Alejandra Idrobo	Colombia	11.77	Q
5	2	Eliecith Palacios	Colombia	11.84	Q
6	1	Victoria Woodward	Argentina	11.86	Q
7	1	Isidora Jiménez	Chile	11.92	q
8	2	Josefina Gutiérrez	Chile	11.99	q
9	2	Lexabeth Hidalgo	Venezuela	12.11	
10	1	Nedian Vargas	Venezuela	12.16	
11	1	Ramona van der Vloot	Suriname	12.18	
12	2	Alisha Fortune	Guyana	12.29	

Final – March 14
Wind:
+1.1 m/s

Rank	Lane	Name	Nationality	Time	Notes
1st place, gold medalist(s)	4	María Alejandra Idrobo	Colombia	11.62	
2nd place, silver medalist(s)	6	Ángela Tenorio	Ecuador	11.64	
3rd place, bronze medalist(s)	5	Franciela Krasucki	Brazil	11.67	
4	3	Erika Chávez	Ecuador	11.70	
5	2	Isidora Jiménez	Chile	11.76	
6	8	Victoria Woodward	Argentina	11.78	PB
7	7	Eliecith Palacios	Colombia	11.78	
8	1	Josefina Gutiérrez	Chile	11.99	

=== 200 meters ===
Heats – March 15
Wind:
Heat 1: -0.6 m/s, Heat 2: -0.2 m/s

Rank	Heat	Name	Nationality	Time	Notes
1	1	Nercely Soto	Venezuela	23.61	Q, PB
2	1	Erika Chávez	Ecuador	23.72	Q
3	2	Darlenys Obregón	Colombia	23.91	Q
4	1	Isidora Jiménez	Chile	23.92	Q
5	2	María Fernanda Mackenna	Chile	23.98	Q
6	2	Wilmary Álvarez	Venezuela	24.22	Q, PB
7	2	Ángela Tenorio	Ecuador	24.23	q
8	1	Jenifer Padilla	Colombia	24.24	q
9	1	Victoria Woodward	Argentina	24.61	
10	2	Ramona van der Vloot	Suriname	24.73	SB
	1	Alisha Fortune	Guyana	DNF	
	2	Franciela Krasucki	Brazil	DNS	

Final – March 15
Wind:
-0.4 m/s

Rank	Lane	Name	Nationality	Time	Notes
1st place, gold medalist(s)	3	Nercely Soto	Venezuela	23.25	PB
2nd place, silver medalist(s)	2	Ángela Tenorio	Ecuador	23.66	
3rd place, bronze medalist(s)	5	Erika Chávez	Ecuador	23.72	
4	5	María Fernanda Mackenna	Chile	24.01	
5	8	Isidora Jiménez	Chile	24.04	
6	7	Wilmary Álvarez	Venezuela	24.30	
7	1	Jenifer Padilla	Colombia	24.49	
	6	Darlenys Obregón	Colombia	DNF	

=== 400 meters ===
March 14

Rank	Lane	Name	Nationality	Time	Notes
1st place, gold medalist(s)	3	Geisa Coutinho	Brazil	51.81	
2nd place, silver medalist(s)	2	Nercely Soto	Venezuela	52.30	
3rd place, bronze medalist(s)	5	Joelma Sousa	Brazil	52.75	
4	5	María Fernanda Mackenna	Chile	53.49	NR
5	1	Jennifer Padilla	Colombia	54.52	
6	4	Maitte Torres	Peru	55.33	PB
7	7	Maryuri Valdez	Venezuela	56.09	PB
8	8	Celene Cevallos	Ecuador	58.25	

=== 800 meters ===
March 16

Rank	Name	Nationality	Time	Notes
1st place, gold medalist(s)	Déborah Rodríguez	Uruguay	2:06.62	
2nd place, silver medalist(s)	Mariana Borelli	Argentina	2:07.57	PB
3rd place, bronze medalist(s)	Christiane dos Santos	Brazil	2:07.96	
4	María Pía Fernández	Uruguay	2:08.62	SB
5	Tatiana Araújo	Brazil	2:09.75	
6	María Caballero	Paraguay	2:10.21	
7	Jenifer Méndez	Ecuador	2:10.75	
8	Javiera Faletto	Chile	2:12.82	
9	Andrea Calderón	Ecuador	2:15.60	

=== 1500 meters ===
March 14

Rank	Name	Nationality	Time	Notes
1st place, gold medalist(s)	Muriel Coneo	Colombia	4:15.66	GR
2nd place, silver medalist(s)	Andrea Ferris	Panama	4:20.81	
3rd place, bronze medalist(s)	Tatiana Araújo	Brazil	4:24.59	
4	Mariana Borelli	Argentina	4:26.94	
5	Érika Lima	Brazil	4:27.72	
6	Verónica Ángel	Chile	4:30.74	
7	María Caballero	Paraguay	4:34.49	
8	Giselle Álvarez	Chile	4:36.91	SB
	Rolanda Bell	Panama	DNS	

=== 5000 meters ===
March 15

Rank	Name	Nationality	Time	Notes
1st place, gold medalist(s)	Inés Melchor	Peru	15:51.20	GR
2nd place, silver medalist(s)	Tatiele Roberta de Carvalho	Brazil	16:04.70	SB
3rd place, bronze medalist(s)	María Peralta	Argentina	16:15.01	
4	Ángela Figueroa	Colombia	16:22.28	
5	Rosa Godoy	Argentina	16:28.21	SB
6	Érika Olivera	Chile	16:37.84	
7	Adriana Aparecida da Silva	Brazil	17:20.94	
8	Jennifer González	Chile	17:26.76	
	Wilma Arizapana	Peru	DNS	

=== 10,000 meters ===
March 13

Rank	Name	Nationality	Time	Notes
1st place, gold medalist(s)	Inés Melchor	Peru	33:10.06	GR, WL
2nd place, silver medalist(s)	Wilma Arizapana	Peru	33:26.84	
3rd place, bronze medalist(s)	Tatiele Roberta de Carvalho	Brazil	33:39.93	
4	Rosa Godoy	Argentina	34:08.16	
5	María Peralta	Argentina	34:15.26	
6	Diana Landi	Ecuador	34:19.34	SB
7	Érika Olivera	Chile	34:21.93	
8	Adriana Aparecida da Silva	Brazil	36:19.37	
	Jennifer González	Chile	DNF	

=== 100 meters hurdles ===
March 14
Wind: -1.6 m/s

Rank	Lane	Name	Nationality	Time	Notes
1st place, gold medalist(s)	5	Yvette Lewis	Panama	13.11	GR
2nd place, silver medalist(s)	8	Lina Flórez	Colombia	13.29	
3rd place, bronze medalist(s)	2	Brigitte Merlano	Colombia	13.30	
4	3	Fabiana Morães	Brazil	13.46	
5	7	Giselle de Albuquerque	Brazil	13.46	
6	7	Ljubica Milos	Chile	13.75	
7	4	Génesis Romero	Venezuela	13.84	PB
8	1	María Ignacia Eguiguren	Chile	14.37	

=== 400 meters hurdles ===
March 15

Rank	Lane	Name	Nationality	Time	Notes
1st place, gold medalist(s)	4	Déborah Rodríguez	Uruguay	56.60	NR, WL
2nd place, silver medalist(s)	3	Javiera Errázuriz	Chile	57.83	
3rd place, bronze medalist(s)	1	Liliane Fernandes	Brazil	59.51	
4	6	Deiscy Moreno	Colombia	59.72	
5	7	Wanessa Zavolski	Brazil	1:01.19	
6	2	Maitte Torres	Peru	1:01.51	PB
7	8	Constanza Castillo	Chile	1:02.31	SB
	5	Magdalena Mendoza	Venezuela	DNF	

=== 3000 meters steeplechase ===
March 16

Rank	Name	Nationality	Time	Notes
1st place, gold medalist(s)	Muriel Coneo	Colombia	10:05.02	GR
2nd place, silver medalist(s)	Ángela Figueroa	Colombia	10:07.02	
3rd place, bronze medalist(s)	Cinthya Paucar	Peru	10:17.64	
4	Valdilene Silva	Brazil	10:35.36	
5	Andrea Ferris	Panama	10:35.55	
6	Margarita Masías	Chile	11:11.91	
7	Ana María Marza	Bolivia	11:29.24	
	Érika Oliveira	Brazil	DNF	

=== 4 x 100 meters relay ===
March 15

Rank	Lane	Nation	Competitors	Time	Notes
1st place, gold medalist(s)	5	Venezuela	Lexabeth Hidalgo, Wilmary Álvarez, Nelsibeth Villalobos, Nercely Soto	45.08	
2nd place, silver medalist(s)	7	Chile	Josefina Gutiérrez, Isidora Jiménez, María Fernanda Mackenna, Daniela Riderelli	45.09	NR
3rd place, bronze medalist(s)	6	Colombia	Lina Flórez, María Alejandra Idrobo, Yenifer Padilla, Eliecith Palacios	45.13	
4	6	Ecuador	Yuliana Angulo, Erika Chávez, Celene Cevallos, Ángela Tenorio	45.43	
	4	Brazil		DNS	

=== 4 x 400 meters relay ===
March 16

Rank	Nation	Competitors	Time	Notes
1st place, gold medalist(s)	Brazil	Joelma Sousa, Wanessa Zavolski, Liliane Fernandes, Geisa Coutinho	3:35.07	GR
2nd place, silver medalist(s)	Colombia	María Alejandra Idrobo, Deiscy Moreno, Jennifer Padilla, Evelis Aguilar	3:35.96	
3rd place, bronze medalist(s)	Chile	Isidora Jiménez, Paula Goñi, Javiera Errázuriz, María Fernanda Mackenna	3:37.42	
4	Venezuela	Nercely Soto, Wilmary Álvarez, Maryuri Valdez, Magdalena Mendoza	3:44.20	
	Ecuador		DNS	

=== 20,000 meters walk ===
March 13

Rank	Name	Nationality	Time	Notes
1st place, gold medalist(s)	Sandra Arenas	Colombia	1:31:46.9	GR, AR, WL
2nd place, silver medalist(s)	Sandra Galvis	Colombia	1:34:04.4	
3rd place, bronze medalist(s)	Érica de Sena	Brazil	1:36:37.3	
4	Paola Pérez	Ecuador	1:41:01.4	SB
5	Cristal Paillalef	Chile	1:51:44.5	
	Wendy Cornejo	Bolivia	DQ	
	Elianay da Silva	Brazil	DQ	
	Claudia Balderrama	Bolivia	DQ	

=== High jump ===
March 16

Rank	Name	Nationality	1.60	1.65	1.70	1.73	1.76	1.79	1.83	Result	Notes
1st place, gold medalist(s)	Yulimar Rojas	Venezuela	–	–	o	o	xo	xo	xxx	1.79	
2nd place, silver medalist(s)	Kashani Ríos	Panama	–	–	o	o	o	xxx		1.76	
3rd place, bronze medalist(s)	Guillerci González	Venezuela	–	–	o	o	xxo	xxx		1.76	
4	Mônica Freitas	Brazil	–	–	–	o	xxx			1.73	
5	Lorena Aires	Uruguay	o	o	xo	xo	xxx			1.73	SB
6	Florencia Vergara	Chile	o	o	o	xxx				1.70	
	Aline Santos	Brazil								DNS	

=== Pole vault ===
March 14

Rank	Name	Nationality	3.25	3.40	3.55	3.70	3.80	3.90	4.00	4.10	4.20	4.30	4.40	4.55	Result	Notes
1st place, gold medalist(s)	Fabiana Murer	Brazil	–	–	–	–	–	–	–	–	–	–	xxo	xxx	4.40	GR
2nd place, silver medalist(s)	Robeilys Peinado	Venezuela	–	–	–	–	–	–	o	–	o	xxx			4.20	
3rd place, bronze medalist(s)	Karla Rosa da Silva	Brazil	–	–	–	–	–	–	–	o	xxx				4.10	
4	Valeria Chiaraviglio	Argentina	–	–	–	–	–	o	o	xxx					4.00	
5	Noelina Madarieta	Argentina	–	–	–	–	xo	xo	xxx						3.90	
6	Giseth Montaño	Colombia	–	–	–	xo	o	xxx							3.80	
7	Jessica Fu	Peru	–	–	o	xo	xxx								3.70	
8	Fernanda Carabias	Chile	xo	o	xo	xxx									3.55	
9	María Victoria Fernández	Chile	–	xo	xxx										3.40	
	Catalina Amarilla	Paraguay	xxx												NM	

=== Long jump ===
March 13

Rank	Name	Nationality	#1	#2	#3	#4	#5	#6	Result	Notes
1st place, gold medalist(s)	Keila Costa	Brazil	x	6.13	x	6.34	6.35	6.33	6.35	
2nd place, silver medalist(s)	Jessica dos Reis	Brazil	6.32	x	6.13	5.80	5.99	6.15	6.32	
3rd place, bronze medalist(s)	Yuliana Angulo	Ecuador	x	x	5.80	6.10	5.96	6.08	6.10	SB
4	Macarena Reyes	Chile	5.97	x	x	x	5.93	x	5.97	
5	Génesis Romero	Venezuela	5.67	x	5.72	5.86	5.92	5.86	5.92	
6	Silvana Segura	Peru	5.68	x	5.61	–	x	5.43	5.68	
7	Valeria Quispe	Bolivia	x	x	5.51	5.31	5.33	5.11	5.51	
8	Giselly Landázury	Colombia	5.37	5.19	5.24	–	–	–	5.37	
9	Munich Tovar	Venezuela	x	x	5.28				5.28	
	Daniela Pávez	Chile	x	–	–				DNF	
	Yosiris Urrutia	Colombia							DNS	

=== Triple jump ===
March 15

Rank	Name	Nationality	#1	#2	#3	#4	#5	#6	Result	Notes
1st place, gold medalist(s)	Keila Costa	Brazil	13.46	x	x	x	x	13.65	13.65	
2nd place, silver medalist(s)	Gisele de Oliveira	Brazil	12.73	13.08	12.80	12.99	–	x	13.08	
3rd place, bronze medalist(s)	Silvana Segura	Peru	x	x	12.86	x	13.07	x	13.07	
4	Daniela Jorquera	Chile	12.72	12.69	12.33	12.61	12.87	12.79	12.87	SB
5	Giselly Landázury	Colombia	x	12.80	12.83	12.76	x	12.63	12.83	
6	Valeria Quispe	Bolivia	x	12.75	12.32	x	12.51	12.32	12.75	SB
	Macarena Reyes	Chile							DNS	
	Yosiris Urrutia	Colombia							DNS	

=== Shot put ===
March 16

Rank	Name	Nationality	#1	#2	#3	#4	#5	#6	Result	Notes
1st place, gold medalist(s)	Natalia Ducó	Chile	17.41	x	17.65	17.77	17.65	18.07	18.07	GR
2nd place, silver medalist(s)	Ahymará Espinoza	Venezuela	17.37	17.63	x	16.80	16.43	17.17	17.63	PB
3rd place, bronze medalist(s)	Sandra Lemos	Colombia	15.81	16.90	17.20	x	x	17.10	17.20	
4	Keely Medeiros	Brazil	17.02	x	16.24	x	x	x	17.02	
5	Ivana Gallardo	Chile	13.50	x	14.78	13.67	14.74	x	14.78	
6	Cecilia Rodríguez	Uruguay	14.02	14.10	14.12	13.84	13.94	14.48	14.48	SB
7	Grace Conley	Bolivia	13.56	14.11	12.76	14.11	x	13.58	14.11	
	Geisa Arcanjo	Brazil							DNS	

=== Discus throw ===
March 15

Rank	Name	Nationality	#1	#2	#3	#4	#5	#6	Result	Notes
1st place, gold medalist(s)	Karen Gallardo	Chile	59.65	56.00	x	x	56.44	53.39	59.65	GR
2nd place, silver medalist(s)	Rocío Comba	Argentina	59.29	x	x	x	x	x	59.29	
3rd place, bronze medalist(s)	Fernanda Raquel Borges	Brazil	55.60	x	56.08	x	53.12	x	56.08	
4	Andressa de Morais	Brazil	48.76	x	x	52.24	50.88	52.62	52.62	
5	Johana Martínez	Colombia	51.74	51.42	x	50.76	48.78	x	51.74	
6	Aixa Middleton	Panama	49.64	x	51.37	x	50.81	51.31	51.37	
7	Ivana Gallardo	Chile	47.92	50.86	x	x	45.31	x	50.86	

=== Hammer throw ===
March 13

Rank	Name	Nationality	#1	#2	#3	#4	#5	#6	Result	Notes
1st place, gold medalist(s)	Rosa Rodríguez	Venezuela	68.61	x	x	68.58	67.01	x	68.61	GR, SB
2nd place, silver medalist(s)	Jennifer Dahlgren	Argentina	67.10	x	x	66.75	67.94	67.65	67.94	
3rd place, bronze medalist(s)	Johana Moreno	Colombia	x	65.58	64.27	x	x	x	65.58	
4	Zuleima Mina	Ecuador	56.16	x	x	x	59.00	57.43	59.00	
5	Odette Palma	Chile	58.03	x	56.88	x	x	57.04	58.03	
6	Marcela Solano	Chile	55.83	55.02	55.18	56.41	56.70	57.17	57.17	
7	Carla Michel	Brazil	55.00	56.72	53.38	54.72	57.02	x	57.02	
8	Anna Paula Pereira	Brazil	52.48	x	x	x	53.43	55.58	55.58	

=== Javelin throw ===
March 14

Rank	Name	Nationality	#1	#2	#3	#4	#5	#6	Result	Notes
1st place, gold medalist(s)	Flor Ruiz	Colombia	60.59	54.40	53.05	x	x	57.47	60.59	GR, SB
2nd place, silver medalist(s)	Jucilene de Lima	Brazil	52.97	56.36	60.17	x	57.69	60.15	60.17	
3rd place, bronze medalist(s)	Laila Ferrer e Silva	Brazil	53.23	51.40	57.11	56.05	56.53	54.91	57.11	
4	María Lucelly Murillo	Colombia	x	53.97	55.34	55.76	x	52.73	55.76	
5	Leryn Franco	Paraguay	50.69	52.86	49.28	x	x	x	52.86	
6	María Paz Ríos	Chile	47.88	48.90	51.64	51.44	x	50.42	51.64	
7	Barbara López	Argentina	47.43	49.14	x	x	46.86	48.14	49.14	
8	Valentina Salazar	Chile	43.99	43.38	x	41.72	42.96	41.51	43.99	

=== Heptathlon ===
March 14–15

The highest mark recorded in each event is highlighted in yellow

Rank	Athlete	Nationality	100m H	HJ	SP	200m	LJ	JT	800m	Points	Notes
1st place, gold medalist(s)	Ana Camila Pirelli	Paraguay	13.66	1.63	12.79	24.92	5.51	41.30	2:16.67	5669	GR
2nd place, silver medalist(s)	Fiorella Chiappe	Argentina	14.33	1.69	10.66	25.36	6.05	35.98	2:13.63	5568	PB
3rd place, bronze medalist(s)	Guillerci González	Venezuela	14.51	1.75	11.29	25.93	5.87	42.60	2:26.18	5509	PB
4	Evelis Aguilar	Colombia	15.05	1.63	12.26	24.39	5.72	36.90	2:14.26	5504	SB
5	Tamara de Sousa	Brazil	14.56	1.72	13.84	25.30	5.89	41.06	2:43.72	5457	
6	Carolina Castillo	Chile	13.75	1.69	10.71	25.16	5.75	32.50	2:22.00	5399	SB
7	Melry Caldeira	Brazil	14.24	1.63	12.12	25.83	5.53	30.48	2:28.33	5106	
8	Javiera Brahm	Chile	14.92	1.48	9.43	26.11	5.18	25.57	2:36.08	4352	
	Agustina Zerboni	Argentina	DNF	DNS	–	–	–	–	–	DNF	
