= Andy Martínez =

Peruvian sprinter

Personal information
- Full name: Andy Steven Martínez Chiroque
- Born: September 28, 1993 (age 32)

Sport
- Country: Peru
- Sport: Athletics
- Event: Sprinting
- College team: National University of San Marcos
- Updated on 19 January 2015

Andy Steven Martínez Chiroque (born 28 September 1993) is a Peruvian athlete specialising in the sprinting events. He won the 100 metres gold medal at the 2014 Ibero-American Championships with a new national record of 10.30.

== Personal bests ==
Event	Result	Venue	Date
60 m	6.84 s	(United States) Portland	18 March 2016
100 m	10.28 s (wind: m/s)	(Bolivia) Tarija	2016
200 m	20.58 s (wind: +1.7 m/s)	(Bolivia) Cochabamba	24 April 2016
400 m	48.41 s	(Peru) Barranco	23 June 2011

== Competition record ==
Year	Competition	Venue	Position	Event	Notes
Representing Peru
2010	South American Youth Championships	Santiago, Chile	9th (h)	100 m	11.18
2010	South American Youth Championships	Santiago, Chile	5th	200 m	22.22
2010	South American Youth Championships	Santiago, Chile	2nd	Medley relay	1:56.70
2012	Ibero-American Championships	Barquisimeto, Venezuela	14th (h)	100 m	10.95
2012	Ibero-American Championships	Barquisimeto, Venezuela	21st (h)	200 m	22.14
2012	World Junior Championships	Barcelona, Spain	47th (h)	100 m	10.88
2012	South American U23 Championships	São Paulo, Brazil	6th	100 m	10.74
2012	South American U23 Championships	São Paulo, Brazil	3rd	4 × 400 m relay	3:14.18
2013	South American Championships	Cartagena, Colombia	12th (h)	100 m	10.98
2013	South American Championships	Cartagena, Colombia	12th (h)	200 m	22.37
2013	Bolivarian Games	Trujillo, Peru	7th	100 m	10.81
2013	Bolivarian Games	Trujillo, Peru	7th	200 m	21.63
2013	Bolivarian Games	Trujillo, Peru	4th	4 × 100 m relay	40.75
2014	South American Games	Santiago, Chile	8th (h)	100 m	10.65
2014	South American Games	Santiago, Chile	6th	200 m	21.35
2014	Ibero-American Championships	São Paulo, Brazil	1st	100 m	10.30
2014	Ibero-American Championships	São Paulo, Brazil	7th (h)	200 m	21.30
2014	South American U23 Championships	Montevideo, Uruguay	1st	100 m	10.40 (+0.3 m/s)
2014	South American U23 Championships	Montevideo, Uruguay	4th	4 × 400 m relay	3:15.72
2016	World Indoor Championships	Portland, United States	41st (h)	60 m	6.84
2016	Ibero-American Championships	Rio de Janeiro, Brazil	7th	100 m	10.39
2017	South American Championships	Asunción, Paraguay	4th	100 m	10.29
2018	South American Games	Cochabamba, Bolivia	8th	100 m	10.54
2018	Ibero-American Championships	Trujillo, Peru	6th	100 m	10.70
2018	Ibero-American Championships	Trujillo, Peru	3rd	4 × 100 m relay	40.69
2019	South American Championships	Lima, Peru	5th	4 × 100 m relay	40.97
2019	Pan American Games	Lima, Peru	23rd (h)	100 m	10.81
2019	Pan American Games	Lima, Peru	9th	4 × 100 m relay	41.19
