= Athletics at the 2013 Bolivarian Games =

Athletics at the XVII Bolivarian Games
- Dates: 26–30 November
- Host city: Trujillo, La Libertad, Perú (Peru)
- Venue: Estadio Chan Chan
- Level: Senior
- Events: 47 (24 men, 23 women)
- Participation: 305 athletes from 11 nations

Athletics (Spanish: Atletismo), for the 2013 Bolivarian Games, took place from 26 to 30 November 2013. A detailed report for the World Athletics was given by Eduardo Biscayart.

== Medal summary ==
=== Men ===
==== Track ====
Event	Gold		Silver		Bronze	
100 metres (wind: -0.3 m/s)	Álex Quiñónez; Ecuador	10.52 sec	Isidro Montoya; Colombia	10.63 sec	Álvaro Cassiani; Venezuela	10.65 sec
200 metres (wind: +0.0 m/s)	Álex Quiñónez; Ecuador	20.47 sec GR	Jermaine Chirinos; Venezuela	21.08 sec	Álvaro Cassiani; Venezuela	21.30 sec
400 metres	Rafith Rodríguez; Colombia	45.62 sec	Alberth Bravo; Venezuela	46.24 sec	Noel Campos; Venezuela	46.41 sec
800 metres	Rafith Rodríguez; Colombia	1:45.14 GR	Lucirio Antonio Garrido; Venezuela	1:47.32	Rolman Ramírez; Venezuela	1:48.03
1500 metres	Freddy Espinosa; Colombia	3:48.97	Iván López; Chile	3:49.08	Marvin Blanco; Venezuela	3:50.95
5000 metres	Leslie Encina; Chile	13:54.60	Iván López; Chile	13:59.10	Jhon Cusi (Peru) Perú	14:05.00
10,000 metres	Leslie Encina; Chile	28:59.79	Bayron Piedra; Ecuador	29:01.64	Gerard Giraldo; Colombia	29:03.59
Half marathon	Diego Colorado; Colombia	1:06:16	Cristopher Guajardo; Chile	1:06:21	Miguel Ángel Almachi; Ecuador	1:06:25
110 metres hurdles (wind: -0.4 m/s)	Jorge McFarlane (Peru) Perú	13.76 sec	Paulo Villar; Colombia	13.80 sec	Javier McFarlane (Peru) Perú	14.00 sec
400 metres hurdles	Lucirio Francisco Garrido; Venezuela	49.74 sec	Emerson Chala; Ecuador	49.76 sec	Paulo Villar; Colombia	50.34 sec
3000 metres steeplechase	José Gregorio Peña; Venezuela	8:26.6 GR	Gerard Giraldo; Colombia	8:28.6	Marvin Blanco; Venezuela	8:41.9
4 × 100 metres relay	Venezuela; Jermaine Chirinos; Álvaro Cassiani; Diego Rivas; Diego Hernández	39.34 sec	Ecuador; Álex Quiñónez; Franklin Nazareno; Jhon Jairo Valencia; Luis Morán	39.62 sec	Colombia; Isidro Montoya; Daniel Grueso; Vladimir Valencia; Yeison Rivas	39.86 sec
4 × 400 metres relay	Colombia; Jhon Perlaza; Jhon Sinisterra; Carlos Lemos; Rafith Rodríguez	3:05.43	Venezuela; Alberth Bravo; Lucirio Antonio Garrido; Lucirio Francisco Garrido; Noel Campos	3:07.19	Ecuador; Franklin Nazareno; Jhon Tamayo; Álex Quiñónez; Emerson Chala	3:12.19
20 kilometres walk	Erick Barrondo; Guatemala	1:23:25	José Leonardo Montaña; Colombia	1:23:43	Richard Vargas; Venezuela	1:24:04
50 kilometres walk	Andrés Chocho; Ecuador	3:58:50 GR	Jorge Armando Ruiz; Colombia	3:59:13	Jonathan Cáceres; Ecuador	4:02:47

==== Field ====
Event	Gold		Silver		Bronze	
High jump	Arturo Chávez (Peru) Perú	2.17 m	Wanner Miller; Colombia	2.16 m	Eure Yáñez; Venezuela	2.16 m
Pole vault	Daniel Zupeuc; Chile	5.00 m	Felipe Andrés Fuentes; Chile	4.70 m	Francisco León (Peru) Perú	4.70 m
Long jump	Jorge McFarlane (Peru) Perú	7.80 m (wind: +0.0 m/s)	Javier McFarlane (Peru) Perú	7.63 m (wind: +0.9 m/s)	Edwin Murillo; Colombia	7.52 m (wind: +0.1 m/s)
Triple jump	Jhon Murillo; Colombia	16.75 m w (wind: +2.4 m/s)	Eddy Florián; Dominican Republic	16.24 m w (wind: +3.6 m/s)	Ángel Delgado; Venezuela	15.94 m w (wind: +3.7 m/s)
Shot put	Aldo González; Bolivia	18.23 m	Eder Moreno; Colombia	18.18 m	Maximiliano Alonso; Chile	17.53 m
Discus throw	Mauricio Ortega; Colombia	59.67 m GR, NR	Jesús Parejo; Venezuela	55.85 m	Maximiliano Alonso; Chile	53.84 m
Javelin throw	Víctor Fatecha; Paraguay	74.49 m	Dayron Márquez; Colombia	73.84 m	Arley Ibargüen; Colombia	71.78 m
Hammer throw	Pedro Muñoz; Venezuela	68.35 m	Aldo Bello; Venezuela	65.76 m	Diego Berríos; Guatemala	64.56 m
Decathlon	Óscar Campos; Venezuela	7204 pts	Ricardo Herrada; Venezuela	7078 pts	José Lemos; Colombia	6987 pts

=== Women ===
==== Track ====
Event	Gold		Silver		Bronze	
100 metres (wind: -1.0 m/s)	Ángela Tenorio; Ecuador	11.47 sec	María Alejandra Idrobo; Colombia	11.72 sec	Érika Chávez; Ecuador	11.78 sec
200 metres (wind: +0.0 m/s)	Nercely Soto; Venezuela	23.46 sec	Érika Chávez; Ecuador	23.67 sec	Ángela Tenorio; Ecuador	23.68 sec
400 metres	Nercely Soto; Venezuela	51.94 sec GR, NR	Jennifer Padilla; Colombia	52.43 sec	Celene Cevallos; Ecuador	53.75 sec
800 metres	Rosibel García; Colombia	2:01.98	Andrea Ferris (Panama) Panamá	2:03.78	María Caballero; Paraguay	2:06.38 NR
1500 metres	Rosibel García; Colombia	4:09.75 GR, NR	Muriel Coneo; Colombia	4:09.79	Andrea Ferris (Panama) Panamá	4:15.22
5000 metres	Inés Melchor (Peru) Perú	15:30.63 GR, NR	Carolina Tabares; Colombia	15:35.30	Wilma Arizapana (Peru) Perú	15:55.70
10,000 metres	Inés Melchor (Peru) Perú	33:52.9 GR	Wilma Arizapana (Peru) Perú	33:55.5	Carolina Tabares; Colombia	34:14.5
Half marathon	Gladys Tejeda (Peru) Perú	1:12:53	Nicolasa Condori (Peru) Perú	1:15:43	Érika Abril; Colombia	1:16:54
100 metres hurdles (wind: +0.1 m/s)	Lina Flórez; Colombia	13.12 sec	Yvette Lewis (Panama) Panamá	13.20 sec	Brigitte Merlano; Colombia	13.60 sec
400 metres hurdles	Yadira Moreno; Colombia	57.17 sec	Javiera Errázuriz; Chile	57.80 sec	Magdalena Mendoza; Venezuela	57.86 sec
3000 metres steeplechase	Muriel Coneo; Colombia	10:00.09 GR	Ángela Figueroa; Colombia	10:01.93	Andrea Ferris (Panama) Panamá	10:03.21
4 × 100 metres relay	Colombia; Eliecith Palacios; Darlenys Obregón; María Alejandra Idrobo; Yomara Hinestroza	43.90 sec	Venezuela; Nercely Soto; Nedian Vargas; Wilmary Álvarez; Lexabeth Hidalgo	44.16 sec	Ecuador; Ángela Tenorio; Celene Cevallos; Érika Chávez; Narcisa Landázuri	44.29 sec
4 × 400 metres relay	Colombia; Rosibel García; Yadira Moreno; Lina Flórez; Jennifer Padilla	3:34.35 GR	Venezuela; Wilmary Álvarez; Emileth Pirela; Magdalena Mendoza; Maryuri Valdez	3:40.49	Chile; Isidora Jiménez; Carolina Castillo; Javiera Errázuriz; Fernanda Mackenna	3:41.74
20 kilometres walk	Mirna Ortiz; Guatemala	1:34:07	Sandra Arenas; Colombia	1:34:23	Kimberly García (Peru) Perú	1:34:29

==== Field ====
Event	Gold		Silver		Bronze	
High jump	Kashani Ríos (Panama) Panamá	1.79 m	Yulimar Rojas; Venezuela	1.76 m	Gabriela Saravia (Peru) Perú	1.65 m
Pole vault	Robeilys Peinado; Venezuela	4.30 m	Giseth Montaño; Colombia	3.60 m	Jéssica Diana Fu (Peru) Perú	3.40 m
Long jump	Paola Mautino (Peru) Perú	6.32 m (wind: +1.6 m/s) NR	Munich Tovar; Venezuela	6.20 m (wind: +1.8 m/s)	Yosiris Urrutia; Colombia	6.10 m w (wind: +2.3 m/s)
Triple jump	Yosiris Urrutia; Colombia	14.08 m (wind: +1.7 m/s) GR	Silvana Segura (Peru) Perú	13.46 m w (wind: +2.7 m/s)	Giselly Landázury; Colombia	13.29 m (wind: +1.9 m/s)
Shot put	Ahymará Espinoza; Venezuela	18.15 m	Sandra Lemos; Colombia	17.45 m	Ivana Gallardo; Chile	16.01 m
Discus throw	Karen Gallardo; Chile	56.77 m	Johana Martínez; Colombia	53.29 m	Aixa Middleton (Panama) Panamá	51.94 m
Hammer throw	Rosa Rodríguez; Venezuela	73.36 m GR	Johana Moreno; Colombia	66.59 m	Zuleima Mina; Ecuador	61.88 m
Javelin throw	Flor Ruiz; Colombia	58.18 m GR	María Lucelly Murillo; Colombia	55.98 m	Ayra Valdivia (Peru) Perú	47.58 m
Heptathlon	Ana Camila Pirelli; Paraguay	5733 pts GR, NR	Guillercy González; Venezuela	5425 pts	Carolina Castillo; Chile	5214 pts

== Medal table ==
Key:

* Host nation (Peru)

Rank	Nation	Gold	Silver	Bronze	Total
1	Colombia (COL)	16	19	11	46
2	Venezuela (VEN)	10	12	10	32
3	Peru (PER)*	7	4	8	19
4	Chile (CHI)	4	5	5	14
5	Ecuador (ECU)	4	4	8	16
6	Guatemala (GUA)	2	0	1	3
6	Paraguay (PAR)	2	0	1	3
8	Panama (PAN)	1	2	3	6
9	Bolivia (BOL)	1	0	0	1
10	Dominican Republic (DOM)	0	1	0	1
Totals (10 entries)		47	47	47	141

== Participation ==
According to an unofficial count, 305 athletes from 11 countries participated.

- Bolivia (27)
- Chile (24)
- Colombia (55)
- Dominican Republic (2)
- Ecuador (43)
- El Salvador (1)
- Guatemala (14)
- (Panama) Panamá (9)
- Paraguay (7)
- (Peru) Perú (69)
- Venezuela (54)
