= Iván López (runner) =

Chilean middle- and long-distance runner

Personal information
- Full name: Iván Guido López Bilbao
- Born: 10 March 1990 (age 36) La Pintana, Chile
- Height: 1.78 m (5 ft 10 in)
- Weight: 66 kg (146 lb)

Sport
- Country: Chile
- Sport: Athletics
- Event: Middle-distance running
- Updated on 1 May 2014

Iván Guido López Bilbao (born 10 March 1990) is a Chilean athlete specialising in the middle-distance events. He won several medals on regional level.

In 2016 he tested positive for CERA, a type of EPO, and was banned from competition for four years between 26 February 2016 and 30 May 2020.

== Competition record ==
Year	Competition	Venue	Position	Event	Notes
Representing Chile
2006	South American Youth Championships	Caracas, Venezuela	2nd	2000 m s'chase	5:53.46
2007	South American Junior Championships	São Paulo, Brazil	6th	1500 m	4:00.72
2007	World Youth Championships	Ostrava, Czech Republic	17th (h)	3000 m	8:37.82
2008	Ibero-American Championships	Iquique, Chile	13th	1500 m	3:51.68
2008	South American U23 Championships	Lima, Peru	6th	1500m	3:54.78
2009	ALBA Games	Havana, Cuba	8th	800 m	1:51.96
2009	ALBA Games	Havana, Cuba	4th	1500 m	3:51.73
2009	South American Championships	Lima, Peru	7th	1500 m	3:47.75
2009	South American Championships	Lima, Peru	9th	5000 m	14:42.61
2009	South American Junior Championships	São Paulo, Brazil	1st	1500 m	3:56.33
2009	South American Junior Championships	São Paulo, Brazil	1st	5000 m	14:39.95
2009	Pan American Junior Championships	Port of Spain, Trinidad and Tobago	3rd	1500 m	3:48.45
2009	Pan American Junior Championships	Port of Spain, Trinidad and Tobago	6th	5000 m	14:37.20
2010	Ibero-American Championships	San Fernando, Spain	8th	1500 m	3:49.13
2010	South American Games / South American U23 Championships	Medellín, Colombia	1st	1500 m	3:48.04
2010	South American Games / South American U23 Championships	Medellín, Colombia	4th	4x400 m relay	3:15.60
2011	Pan American Games	Guadalajara, Mexico	8th	1500 m	3:56.53
2012	South American Road Mile Championships	Belém, Brazil	2nd	One mile	3:59
2012	Ibero-American Championships	Barquisimeto, Venezuela	4th	1500 m	3:48.95
2012	South American U23 Championships	São Paulo, Brazil	4th	800 m	1:49.29
2012	South American U23 Championships	São Paulo, Brazil	2nd	1500 m	3:48.07
2013	South American Championships	Cartagena, Colombia	4th (h)	800 m	1:51.27
2013	South American Championships	Cartagena, Colombia	3rd	1500 m	3:46.00
2013	Bolivarian Games	Trujillo, Peru	2nd	1500 m	3:49.08
2013	Bolivarian Games	Trujillo, Peru	2nd	5000 m	13:59.10
2014	South American Games	Santiago, Chile	2nd	1500 m	3:42.62
2014	South American Games	Santiago, Chile	6th	5000 m	14:23.33
2014	Ibero-American Championships	São Paulo, Brazil	4th	1500 m	3:45.59
2014	Ibero-American Championships	São Paulo, Brazil	7th	3000 m	8:12.46
2016	World Indoor Championships	Portland, United States	11th (h)	1500 m	3:48.63
2016	Ibero-American Championships	Rio de Janeiro, Brazil	1st	1500 m	3:38.64
2016	Ibero-American Championships	Rio de Janeiro, Brazil	1st	3000 m	7:52.53

== Personal bests ==
- 800 metres – 1:49.29 (São Paulo, Brazil, 23 September 2012)
- 1000 metres – 2:26.75 (Santiago, Chile 2009)
- 1500 metres – 3:38.56 (Amiens, France, 21 June 2014)
- 3000 metres – 7:52.53 (Rio de Janeiro, Brazil, 14 May 2016), Chilean record
- 5000 metres – 13:51.48 (Santiago, Chile, 14 February 2014)
