= Dayron Márquez =

Colombian javelin thrower

Personal information
- Full name: Jaime Dayron Márquez Gutiérrez
- Born: 11 June 1983 (age 43) Pradera, Valle del Cauca, Colombia
- Height: 1.78 m (5 ft 10 in)
- Weight: 85 kg (187 lb)

Sport
- Country: Colombia
- Sport: Athletics
- Event: Javelin thrower
- Updated on 27 December 2014

Jaime Dayron Márquez Gutiérrez (born 11 June 1983) is a Colombian javelin thrower. He competed in the javelin throw at the 2012 Summer Olympics and placed 26th with a mark of 77.59 metres.

== Personal bests ==
- Javelin throw: 82.39 m NR – Medellín, Colombia, 10 July 2016

== Achievements ==
Year	Competition	Venue	Position	Event	Notes
Representing Colombia
2000	South American Youth Championships	Bogotá, Colombia	2nd	Javelin (700g)	62.44 m
2001	South American Junior Championships	Santa Fe, Argentina	2nd	Javelin	67.35 m
2001	Pan American Junior Championships	Santa Fe, Argentina	4th	Javelin	64.18 m
2002	Central American and Caribbean Junior Championships	Bridgetown, Barbados	3rd	Javelin	62.86 m
2002	World Junior Championships	Kingston, Jamaica	23rd (q)	Javelin	60.25 m
2006	South American Championships	Tunja, Colombia	6th	Javelin	69.93 m
2008	Central American and Caribbean Championships	Cali, Colombia	2nd	Javelin	74.37 m
2009	Central American and Caribbean Championships	Havana, Cuba	2nd	Javelin	78.91 m
2009	Bolivarian Games	Sucre, Bolivia	1st	Javelin	73.70 m
2010	Ibero-American Championships	San Fernando, Spain	3rd	Javelin	74.77 m
2010	Central American and Caribbean Games	Mayagüez, Puerto Rico	2nd	Javelin	76.31 m
2011	South American Championships	Buenos Aires, Argentina	2nd	Javelin	73.15 m
2011	Central American and Caribbean Championships	Mayagüez, Puerto Rico	6th	Javelin	74.07 m
2012	Ibero-American Championships	Barquisimeto, Venezuela	3rd	Javelin	76.48 m
2012	Olympic Games	London, United Kingdom	26th (q)	Javelin	77.59 m
2013	Bolivarian Games	Trujillo, Peru	2nd	Javelin	73.84 m
2014	South American Games	Santiago, Chile	3rd	Javelin	75.11 m
2014	Ibero-American Championships	São Paulo, Brazil	1st	Javelin	78.80 m
2014	Pan American Sports Festival	Mexico City, Mexico	5th	Javelin	76.23 m A
2014	Central American and Caribbean Games	Xalapa, Mexico	4th	Javelin	75.68 m A
2015	South American Championships	Lima, Peru	4th	Javelin	74.10 m
2015	Pan American Games	Toronto, Canada	6th	Javelin	75.86 m
2016	Ibero-American Championships	Rio de Janeiro, Brazil	2nd	Javelin	80.08 m
2017	Bolivarian Games	Santa Marta, Colombia	2nd	Javelin	76.75 m
2019	Pan American Games	Lima, Peru	8th	Javelin	73.99 m

== Seasonal bests by year ==
- 2002 – 70.05
- 2004 – 75.30
- 2005 – 71.98
- 2008 – 76.67
- 2009 – 79.32
- 2010 – 78.38
- 2011 – 79.35
- 2012 – 80.61
- 2013 – 79.03
- 2014 – 78.02
- 2015 – 80.17
