= Athletics at the 2010 South American Games – Women's 200 metres =

Women's 200m

The Women's 200m event at the 2010 South American Games was held on March 21, 2010, with the heats at 10:30 and the Final at 18:35.

== Medalists ==
Gold	Silver	Bronze
Érika Chávez; Ecuador	Vanda Gomes; Brazil	Bárbara Leôncio; Brazil

== Records ==
Standing records prior to the 2010 South American Games
World record	Florence Griffith-Joyner	United States	21.34	Seoul, South Korea	29 September 1988
World Leading	Sally McLellan	Australia	23.19	Sydney, Australia	27 February 2010
South American record	Lucimar Aparecida de Moura	Brazil	22.60	Bogotá, Colombia	26 June 1999
South American U23 record	Ximena Restrepo	Colombia	22.92	Lincoln, Nebraska, United States	20 May 1991

== Results ==
Results were published.

=== Heats ===
==== Heat 1 ====
Rank	Athlete	Nationality	Reaction	Result	Notes
1	Bárbara Leôncio	Brazil	0.223	24.04 Q	
2	María Alejandra Idrobo	Colombia	0.248	24.12 Q	
3	Leslie Arnez	Bolivia		24.95 Q	
4	Paola Mautino	(Peru) Perú	0.226	25.65	
5	Marysabel Romero	Bolivia	0.267	25.81	
			Wind: +1.1 m/s		

==== Heat 2 ====
Rank	Athlete	Nationality	Reaction	Result	Notes
1	Érika Chávez	Ecuador	0.225	23.67 Q	
2	Yenifer Padilla	Colombia	0.220	23.81 Q	
3	Vanda Gomes	Brazil	0.201	23.86 Q	
4	María Florencia Lamboglia	Argentina	0.228	24.71 q	SB
5	Isidora Jiménez	Chile	0.213	25.13 q	SB
			Wind: +0.9 m/s		

=== Final ===
Rank	Athlete	Nationality	Reaction	Result	Notes
1st place, gold medalist(s)	Érika Chávez	Ecuador	0.235	23.71	
2nd place, silver medalist(s)	Vanda Gomes	Brazil	0.210	23.82	
3rd place, bronze medalist(s)	Bárbara Leôncio	Brazil	0.226	23.86	
4	Yenifer Padilla	Colombia	0.287	24.11	
5	María Alejandra Idrobo	Colombia	0.331	24.20	
6	María Florencia Lamboglia	Argentina	0.203	25.05	
7	Leslie Arnez	Bolivia		25.09	
8	Isidora Jiménez	Chile	0.233	25.24	SB
			Wind: -0.7 m/s		

== See also ==
- 2010 South American Under-23 Championships in Athletics
