= Erika Chávez =

Ecuadorian sprinter (born 1990)

Érika Chávez
Personal information
- Full name: Érika Benilda Chávez Quinteros
- Born: 4 June 1990 (age 36) San Lorenzo, Esmeraldas, Ecuador
- Height: 1.70 m (5 ft 7 in)
- Weight: 56 kg (123 lb)

Sport
- Country: Ecuador
- Sport: Athletics
- Event: Sprinting
- Updated on 7 May 2014

Érika Benilda Chávez Quinteros (born 4 June 1990) is an Ecuadorian sprinter.

== Career ==
At the 2012 Summer Olympics, she competed in the Women's 200 metres.

== Personal bests ==
- 100 m: 11.54 s A (wind: -0.5 m/s) – La Paz, Bolivia, 25 May 2012
- 200 m: 23.09 s A (wind: +0.6 m/s) – Mexico City, Mexico, 13 May 2012
- 400 m: 54.43 s A – Zamora, Ecuador, 29 November 2008
- 400 m hurdles: 61.05 s A – Zamora, Ecuador, 30 November 2008

== Achievements ==
Year	Competition	Venue	Position	Event	Notes
Representing Ecuador
2004	South American Youth Championships	Guayaquil, Ecuador	6th	400 m	57.86 s
2004	South American Youth Championships	Guayaquil, Ecuador	2nd	1000 m Medley relay	2:11.8 min
2005	World Youth Championships	Marrakesh, Morocco	7th (h)	400 m	60.58 s
2005	Bolivarian Games	Armenia, Colombia	3rd	4 × 400 m relay	3:45.12 min A
2005	South American Junior Championships	Rosario, Argentina	4th (h)	400 m	59.17 s
2005	South American Junior Championships	Rosario, Argentina	6th	4 × 100 m relay	48.81 s
2005	South American Junior Championships	Rosario, Argentina	3rd	4 × 400 m relay	3:45.66 min
2006	South American Championships	Tunja, Colombia	6th	100 m	12.28 s A (wind: -2.1 m/s)
2006	South American Championships	Tunja, Colombia	5th	200 m	24.81 s A (wind: -2.5 m/s)
2006	South American Championships	Tunja, Colombia	8th	400 m	59.15 s A
2006	South American Championships	Tunja, Colombia	3rd	4 × 100 m relay	47.47 s A
2006	South American Championships	Tunja, Colombia	3rd	4 × 400 m relay	3:47.58 min A
2006	South American Youth Championships	Caracas, Venezuela	3rd	200 m	24.59 s (wind: +0.0 m/s)
2006	South American Youth Championships	Caracas, Venezuela	1st	400 m	55.48 s
2006	South American Youth Championships	Caracas, Venezuela	6th	4 × 100 m relay	49.20 s
2006	South American Youth Championships	Caracas, Venezuela	4th	1000 m medley relay	2:16.94 min
2006	South American U23 Championships / South American Games	Buenos Aires, Argentina	7th	200m	24.66 (wind: +1.7 m/s)
2006	South American U23 Championships / South American Games	Buenos Aires, Argentina	7th	400m	57.45
2006	South American U23 Championships / South American Games	Buenos Aires, Argentina	5th	4 × 100 m relay	47.29
2006	South American U23 Championships / South American Games	Buenos Aires, Argentina	3rd	4 × 400 m relay	3:45.77
2007	South American Junior Championships	São Paulo, Brazil	5th	200 m	24.95 s (wind: +0.0 m/s)
2007	South American Junior Championships	São Paulo, Brazil	8th	400 m	58.04 s
2007	South American Junior Championships	São Paulo, Brazil	4th	4 × 100 m relay	47.44 s
2007	Pan American Junior Championships	São Paulo, Brazil	3rd (h)	200 m	24.66 s (wind: +0.2 m/s)
2007	Pan American Junior Championships	São Paulo, Brazil	6th (h)	400 m	56.06 s
2007	Pan American Junior Championships	São Paulo, Brazil	–	4 × 100 m relay	DNF
2007	Pan American Junior Championships	São Paulo, Brazil	6th	4 × 400 m relay	3:45.25 min
2007	Pan American Games	Rio de Janeiro, Brazil	5th (h)	200 m	24.47 s (wind: +0.4 m/s)
2007	Pan American Games	Rio de Janeiro, Brazil	6th (h)	4 × 100 m relay	46.55 s
2007	Pan American Games	Rio de Janeiro, Brazil	8th	4 × 400 m relay	3:43.88 min
2009	ALBA Games	Havana, Cuba	5th (h)	100 m	12.49 s (wind: +0.6 m/s)
2009	ALBA Games	Havana, Cuba	7th	200 m	25.47 s (wind: +0.7 m/s)
2009	ALBA Games	Havana, Cuba	6th	4 × 100 m relay	48.20 s
2009	ALBA Games	Havana, Cuba	3rd	4 × 400 m relay	3:45.70 min
2009	South American Championships	Lima, Peru	4th	200 m	24.45 s A (wind: +0.0 m/s)
2009	South American Championships	Lima, Peru	3rd	4 × 100 m relay	47.20 s A
2009	South American Championships	Lima, Peru	3rd	4 × 400 m relay	3:45.99 min A
2009	South American Junior Championships	São Paulo, Brazil	1st	100 m	11.83 s (wind: +1.0 m/s)
2009	South American Junior Championships	São Paulo, Brazil	2nd	200 m	23.85 s (wind: +0.2 m/s)
2009	Bolivarian Games	Sucre, Bolivia	3rd	200 m	23.65 s A
2009	Bolivarian Games	Sucre, Bolivia	1st (h)	400 m	55.43 s A
2009	Bolivarian Games	Sucre, Bolivia	3rd	4 × 100 m relay	46.28 s A
2009	Bolivarian Games	Sucre, Bolivia	3rd	4 × 400 m relay	3:41.42 min A NR
2010	South American U23 Championships (South American Games)	Medellín, Colombia	4th	100 m	11.80 s A (wind: +1.5 m/s)
2010	South American U23 Championships (South American Games)	Medellín, Colombia	1st	200 m	23.71 s A (wind: -0.7 m/s)
2010	Ibero-American Championships	San Fernando, Spain	4th	200 m	23.95 s (wind: +0.5 m/s)
2011	South American Championships	Buenos Aires, Argentina	5th	100 m	11.92 s (wind: +0.1 m/s)
2011	South American Championships	Buenos Aires, Argentina	4th	200 m	23.72 s (wind: +0.4 m/s)
2011	ALBA Games	Barquisimeto, Venezuela	2nd	200 m	23.72 s (wind: +2.0 m/s)
2011	ALBA Games	Barquisimeto, Venezuela	3rd	4 × 100 m relay	48.02 s
2011	Universiade	Shenzhen, China	5th (h)	100 m	12.14 s (wind: -2.0 m/s)
2011	Pan American Games	Guadalajara, Mexico	5th (h)	200 m	23.67 s A (wind: +0.0 m/s)
2011	Pan American Games	Guadalajara, Mexico	6th	4 × 100 m relay	46.18 s A
2011	Pan American Games	Guadalajara, Mexico	6th	4 × 400 m relay	3:45.59 min A
2012	Ibero-American Championships	Barquisimeto, Venezuela	5th	200 m	23.36 s (wind: +0.9 m/s)
2012	Ibero-American Championships	Barquisimeto, Venezuela	6th	4 × 100 m relay	46.58 s
2012	Ibero-American Championships	Barquisimeto, Venezuela	6th	4 × 400 m relay	3:50.37 min
2012	Olympic Games	London, United Kingdom	7th (h)	200 metres	23.70 s (wind: +1.5 m/s)
2013	South American Championships	Cartagena, Colombia	4th	100 m	11.64 s (wind: -0.1 m/s)
2013	South American Championships	Cartagena, Colombia	3rd	200 m	23.10 s (wind: +3.4 m/s)
2013	South American Championships	Cartagena, Colombia	5th	4 × 100 m relay	45.93 s
2013	South American Championships	Cartagena, Colombia	3rd	4 × 400 m relay	3:43.01 min
2013	Bolivarian Games	Trujillo, Peru	3rd	100 m	11.78 (wind: -1.0 m/s)
2013	Bolivarian Games	Trujillo, Peru	2nd	200 m	23.67 (wind: +0.0 m/s)
2013	Bolivarian Games	Trujillo, Peru	3rd	4 × 100 m relay	44.29
2014	South American Games	Santiago, Chile	4th	100 m	11.70 s
2014	South American Games	Santiago, Chile	3rd	200 m	23.72 s
2014	South American Games	Santiago, Chile	4th	4 × 100 m relay	45.43 s
