= Lina Flórez =

Colombian hurdler (born 1984)

Personal information
- Full name: Lina Marcela Flórez Valencia
- Born: 2 November 1984 (age 41) Carepa, Antioquia, Colombia
- Height: 1.65 m (5 ft 5 in)
- Weight: 55 kg (121 lb)

Sport
- Country: Colombia
- Sport: Athletics
- Event: Hurdling
Medal record
Representing Colombia
Pan American Games
Bronze medal – third place	2011 Guadalajara	100m hurdles
Bronze medal – third place	2011 Guadalajara	4x100m relay
Central American and Caribbean Games
Gold medal – first place	2014 Xalapa	100m hurdles
South American Games
Silver medal – second place	2014 Santiago	100m hurdles
Bronze medal – third place	2014 Santiago	4x100m relay
- Updated on 2 January 2014

Lina Marcela Flórez Valencia (born 2 November 1984) is a Colombian hurdler. At the 2012 Summer Olympics, she competed in the Women's 100 metres hurdles.

== Personal bests ==
- 100 m: 11.51 (wind: +2.0 m/s) – Medellín, Colombia, 25 May 2013
- 400 m: 54.44 – Bogotá, Colombia, 20 July 2013
- 100 m hurdles: 12.94 (wind: +0.9 m/s) – Mayagüez, Puerto Rico, 17 July 2011
- 400 m hurdles: 58.91 – Trujillo, Peru, 28 November 2013

== International competitions ==
Year	Competition	Venue	Position	Event	Notes
Representing Colombia
2009	Universiade	Belgrade, Serbia	10th (sf)	100 m hurdles	13.48
2009	Bolivarian Games	Sucre, Bolivia	2nd	100 m hurdles	13.43 (-0.1 m/s)
2009	Bolivarian Games	Sucre, Bolivia	1st	4 × 100 m relay	43.96
2011	South American Championships	Buenos Aires, Argentina	3rd	100 m hurdles	13.23
2011	Central American and Caribbean Championships	Mayagüez, Puerto Rico	3rd	100 m hurdles	12.94
2011	South American Championships	Buenos Aires, Argentina	3rd	100 m hurdles	13.23
2011	World Championships	Daegu, South Korea	14th (sf)	100 m hurdles	12.94
2011	Pan American Games	Guadalajara, Mexico	3rd	100 m hurdles	13.09
2011	Pan American Games	Guadalajara, Mexico	3rd	4 × 100 m relay	43.44
2012	Olympic Games	London, United Kingdom	23rd (h)	100 m hurdles	13.17
2013	South American Championships	Cartagena, Colombia	1st	100 m hurdles	13.09
2013	South American Championships	Cartagena, Colombia	2nd	4 × 100 m relay	44.01
2013	South American Championships	Cartagena, Colombia	2nd	4 × 400 m relay	3:36.29
2013	World Championships	Moscow, Russia	15th (sf)	100 m hurdles	13.01
2013	Bolivarian Games	Trujillo, Peru	1st	100 m hurdles	13.12 (+0.1 m/s)
2013	Bolivarian Games	Trujillo, Peru	4th	400 m hurdles	58.91
2013	Bolivarian Games	Trujillo, Peru	1st	4 × 400 m relay	3:34.35
2014	South American Games	Santiago, Chile	2nd	100 m hurdles	13.29
2014	South American Games	Santiago, Chile	3rd	4 × 100 m relay	45.13
2014	Ibero-American Championships	São Paulo, Brazil	3rd	100 m hurdles	13.18
2014	Pan American Sports Festival	Mexico City, Mexico	3rd (h)^{1}	100m hurdles	13.22 A (+0.6 m/s)
2014	Central American and Caribbean Games	Xalapa, Mexico	1st	100m hurdles	13.19 A (-0.8 m/s)
2014	Central American and Caribbean Games	Xalapa, Mexico	2nd	4 × 100 m relay	44.02 A
2016	Ibero-American Championships	Rio de Janeiro, Brazil	7th	100 m hurdles	13.88

^{1}: Disqualified in the final (false start).
