= Eliecith Palacios =

Colombian sprinter (born 1987)

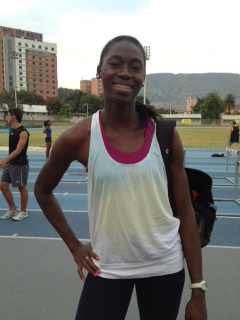

Personal information
- Full name: Eliecith Palacios Santos
- Born: 15 September 1987 (age 38) Carepa, Antioquia, Colombia
- Height: 1.75 m (5 ft 9 in)
- Weight: 67 kg (148 lb)

Sport
- Sport: Athletics
Medal record
Representing Colombia
Central American and Caribbean Games
Gold medal – first place	2010 Mayagüez	4x100m relay
Silver medal – second place	2010 Mayagüez	110m hurdles
Silver medal – second place	2014 Veracruz	4x100m relay
- Updated on 28 December 2014

Eliecith Palacios Santos (born 15 September 1987) is a Colombian sprinter.

== Career ==
She competed for the Colombian team in the 4 × 100 metres relay at the 2012 Summer Olympics; the team placed 11th with a time of 43.21 in Round 1 and did not qualify for the final.

== Personal bests ==
- 100 m: 11.21 (wind: +0.7 m/s) – Medellín, Colombia, 10 July 2016
- 200 m: 24.31 (wind: +1.1 m/s) – Ponce, Puerto Rico, 16 April 2011
- 100 m hurdles: 13.15 (wind: +0.4 m/s) – Barquisimeto, Venezuela, 9 June 2012

== International competitions ==
Year	Competition	Venue	Position	Event	Notes
Representing Colombia
2004	South American Youth Championships	Guayaquil, Ecuador	3rd	100 m hurdles	14.57 s (wind: +0.8 m/s)
2004	South American Youth Championships	Guayaquil, Ecuador	3rd	4 × 100 m relay	47.29 s
2004	South American Youth Championships	Guayaquil, Ecuador	3rd	1000 m Medley relay	2:13.2 min
2005	South American Junior Championships	Rosario, Argentina	6th	100 m hurdles	14.90 w (wind: +2.4 m/s)
2006	South American Championships	Tunja, Colombia	6th	100 m hurdles	15.04 (wind: -2.9 m/s)
2010	Ibero-American Championships	San Fernando, Spain	4th	100 m hurdles	13.42 (wind: +0.5 m/s)
2010	Ibero-American Championships	San Fernando, Spain	2nd	4 × 100 m relay	44.29
2010	Central American and Caribbean Games	Mayagüez, Puerto Rico	2nd	100 m hurdles	13.20 (wind: +0.1 m/s)
2010	Central American and Caribbean Games	Mayagüez, Puerto Rico	1st	4 × 100 m relay	43.63
2011	South American Championships	Buenos Aires, Argentina	1st	4 × 100 m relay	44.11
2011	Central American and Caribbean Championships	Mayagüez, Puerto Rico	6th	100 m	11.59 (wind: +0.5 m/s)
2011	Central American and Caribbean Championships	Mayagüez, Puerto Rico	4th	4 × 100 m relay	43.92
2011	Pan American Games	Guadalajara, Mexico	12th (h)	100 m	11.77 (wind: -2.0 m/s)
2012	Ibero-American Championships	Barquisimeto, Venezuela	1st	100 m hurdles	13.15 (wind: +0.4 m/s)
2012	Ibero-American Championships	Barquisimeto, Venezuela	3rd	4 × 100 m relay	44.42
2012	Olympic Games	London, United Kingdom	11th (h)	4 × 100 m relay	43.21
2013	South American Championships	Cartagena, Colombia	3rd	100 m	11.56 (wind: -0.1 m/s)
2013	South American Championships	Cartagena, Colombia	2nd	4 × 100 m relay	44.01
2013	World Championships	Moscow, Russia	15th (h)	4 × 100 m relay	43.65
2013	Bolivarian Games	Trujillo, Peru	4th	100 m	11.88 (wind: -1.0 m/s)
2013	Bolivarian Games	Trujillo, Peru	1st	4 × 100 m relay	43.90
2014	South American Games	Santiago, Chile	6th	100 m	11.78 (wind: -0.1 m/s)
2014	South American Games	Santiago, Chile	3rd	4 × 100 m relay	45.13
2014	Ibero-American Championships	São Paulo, Brazil	2nd	100 m	11.40 (wind: 0.0 m/s)
2014	Central American and Caribbean Games	Xalapa, Mexico	4th	100 m	11.55 A (wind: +1.5 m/s)
2014	Central American and Caribbean Games	Xalapa, Mexico	2nd	4 × 100 m relay	44.02 A
2015	South American Championships	Lima, Peru	5th	100 m	11.71
2016	Ibero-American Championships	Rio de Janeiro, Brazil	10th (h)	100 m	11.60
2016	Ibero-American Championships	Rio de Janeiro, Brazil	4th	4 × 100 m relay	44.14
2016	Olympic Games	Rio de Janeiro, Brazil	33rd (h)	100 m	11.48
2017	South American Championships	Asunción, Paraguay	2nd	4 × 100 m relay	44.50
2017	Bolivarian Games	Santa Marta, Colombia	5th	100 m	11.70
2017	Bolivarian Games	Santa Marta, Colombia	2nd	100 m hurdles	13.42
2017	Bolivarian Games	Santa Marta, Colombia	3rd	4 × 100 m relay	45.96
2018	Central American and Caribbean Games	Barranquilla, Colombia	6th	100 m hurdles	13.28
2018	Central American and Caribbean Games	Barranquilla, Colombia	4th	4 × 100 m relay	44.19
2018	Ibero-American Championships	Trujillo, Peru	6th	100 m	12.22
2019	South American Championships	Lima, Peru	8th	100 m	11.86
2019	South American Championships	Lima, Peru	2nd	100 m hurdles	13.49
2019	South American Championships	Lima, Peru	2nd	4 × 100 m relay	44.97
