= Athletics at the 2010 South American Games – Men's 1500 metres =

The Men's 1,500m event at the 2010 South American Games was held on March 22 at 18:10.

== Medalists ==
Gold	Silver	Bronze
Iván López; Chile	Marvin Blanco; Venezuela	José Mauricio González; Colombia

== Records ==
Standing records prior to the 2010 South American Games
World record	Hicham El Guerrouj	Morocco	3:26.00	Rome, Italy	14 July 1998
World Leading	Ryan Gregson	Australia	3:35.42	Sydney, Australia	27 February 2010
South American record	Hudson de Souza	Brazil	3:33.25	Rieti, Italy	28 August 2005
South American U23 record	Joaquim Cruz	Brazil	3:35.70	Eugene, United States	1 June 1985

== Results ==
Results were published.

Rank	Athlete	Nationality	Result	Notes
1st place, gold medalist(s)	Iván López	Chile	3:38.04	
2nd place, silver medalist(s)	Marvin Blanco	Venezuela	3:49.65	
3rd place, bronze medalist(s)	José Mauricio González	Colombia	3:50.09	
4	Fabio Queiroz	Brazil	3:52.62	
5	Luciano Almirón	Argentina	3:56.12	
6	Franco Díaz	Argentina	3:56.26	
7	Alex Cisneros	Ecuador	3:59.49	
8	Eduardo Gregorio	Uruguay	4:07.28	
9	Patrick Machado	Brazil	4:10.61	
10	Dennis Horatio	Guyana	4:13.53	
–	José Alarcón	Chile	DNF	

Intermediate times:

400m	59.92	José Alarcón (CHI)
800m	2:01.42	José Alarcón (CHI)
1200m	3:03.87	Iván López (CHI)

== See also ==
- 2010 South American Under-23 Championships in Athletics
