= Yosiris Urrutia =

Colombian athlete (born 1986)

Personal information
- Born: 26 June 1986 (age 40) Apartadó, Colombia
- Height: 176 cm (5 ft 9 in)
- Weight: 61 kg (134 lb)

Sport
- Sport: Track and field
- Events: Triple jump, long jump

Yosiris Urrutia Chaverra (born 26 June 1986) is a Colombian athlete whose specialty is the triple jump. She competed at the 2015 World Championships in Beijing, finishing tenth. She also won the bronze at the 2015 Pan American Games. She represented Colombia at the 2020 Summer Olympics.

Her personal bests are 14.58 metres in the triple jump (+0.7 m/s, Monaco 2014) and 6.53 metres in the long jump (-5.3 m/s, Cali 2010).

== Competition record ==
Year	Competition	Venue	Position	Event	Notes
Representing Colombia
2010	Central American and Caribbean Games	Mayagüez, Puerto Rico	10th	Long jump	5.84 m
2011	Central American and Caribbean Championships	Mayagüez, Puerto Rico	12th	Long jump	5.69 m
2013	South American Championships	Cartagena, Colombia	5th	Long jump	6.36 m (w)
2013	South American Championships	Cartagena, Colombia	2nd	Triple jump	13.92 m
2013	Bolivarian Games	Trujillo, Peru	3rd	Long jump	6.10 m (w)
2013	Bolivarian Games	Trujillo, Peru	1st	Triple jump	14.08 m
2014	Ibero-American Championships	São Paulo, Brazil	1st	Triple jump	14.41 m
2014	Central American and Caribbean Games	Xalapa, Mexico	5th	Long jump	6.13 m
2014	Central American and Caribbean Games	Xalapa, Mexico	3rd	Triple jump	13.89 m
2015	Pan American Games	Toronto, Canada	3rd	Triple jump	14.38 m (w)
2015	World Championships	Beijing, China	10th	Triple jump	14.09 m
2016	Ibero-American Championships	Rio de Janeiro, Brazil	3rd	Triple jump	13.89 m
2016	Olympic Games	Rio de Janeiro, Brazil	20th (q)	Triple jump	13.95 m
2017	South American Championships	Asunción, Paraguay	3rd	Triple jump	13.64 m (w)
2017	Bolivarian Games	Santa Marta, Colombia	4th	Long jump	6.03 m
2017	Bolivarian Games	Santa Marta, Colombia	4th	Triple jump	13.11 m
2018	Central American and Caribbean Games	Barranquilla, Colombia	2nd	Triple jump	14.47 m
2018	Ibero-American Championships	Trujillo, Peru	1st	Triple jump	14.14 m (w)
2019	South American Championships	Lima, Peru	7th	Long jump	6.06 m
2019	South American Championships	Lima, Peru	1st	Triple jump	13.85 m
2019	Pan American Games	Lima, Peru	9th	Triple jump	13.35 m
2019	World Championships	Doha, Qatar	19th (q)	Triple jump	13.77 m
2021	Olympic Games	Tokyo, Japan	27th (q)	Triple jump	13.16 m
