= Leslie Encina =

Chilean long-distance runner

Personal information
- Nationality: Chilean
- Born: 2 January 1982 (age 44)

Sport
- Sport: Long-distance running
- Event: Marathon

Leslie Encina (born 2 January 1982) is a Chilean long distance runner. He competed in the men's marathon at the 2017 World Championships in Athletics. In 2018, he competed in the men's half marathon at the 2018 IAAF World Half Marathon Championships held in Valencia, Spain. He finished in 98th place.
