= Emerson Alejandro Chala =

Ecuadorian hurdler

Personal information
- Born: 2 August 1991 (age 34)

Sport
- Sport: Track and field

Emerson Alejandro Chala (born 2 August 1991) is an Ecuadorian hurdler competing in the 400 metres hurdles.

Chala has represented his country in the Pan American Games, South American Games, Ibero-American Championships, and the Bolivarian Games.

In 2013 he was among the top 60 400 metre hurdlers in the world. He also won the Ecuadorian National Games in the 400 metres hurdler event where he set a national record.
