= 2013 South American Championships in Athletics – Results =

These are the official results of the 2013 South American Championships in Athletics which took place on July 5–7 in Cartagena, Colombia.

== Men's results ==
=== 100 meters ===
Heats – July 5
Wind:
Heat 1: -1.9 m/s, Heat 2: -0.9 m/s

Rank	Heat	Name	Nationality	Time	Notes
1	2	Jeremy Bascom	Guyana	10.47	Q
2	2	Vladimir Valencia	Colombia	10.51	Q
3	1	Álex Quiñónez	Ecuador	10.54	Q
4	2	Jermaine Chirinos	Venezuela	10.58	Q
5	2	José Carlos Moreira	Brazil	10.62	q
6	1	Isidro Montoya	Colombia	10.64	Q
7	1	Bruno de Barros	Brazil	10.67	Q
8	1	Ifrish Alberg	Suriname	10.79	q
9	2	Andrés Rodríguez	Panama	10.88	
10	2	Alvaro Cassiani	Venezuela	10.91	
11	1	Mateo Edward	Panama	10.92	
12	1	Andy Martínez	Peru	10.98	
	2	Franklin Nazareno	Ecuador	DNF	
	1	Arthur Rojas	Bolivia	DQ	FS

Final – July 5
Wind:
+1.3 m/s

Rank	Name	Nationality	Time	Notes
1st place, gold medalist(s)	Álex Quiñónez	Ecuador	10.22	
2nd place, silver medalist(s)	Bruno de Barros	Brazil	10.33	
3rd place, bronze medalist(s)	Isidro Montoya	Colombia	10.38	
4	José Carlos Moreira	Brazil	10.38	
5	Jeremy Bascom	Guyana	10.43	
6	Vladimir Valencia	Colombia	10.44	
7	Ifrish Alberg	Suriname	10.57	
8	Jermaine Chirinos	Venezuela	10.63	

=== 200 meters ===
Heats – July 6
Wind:
Heat 1: -1.3 m/s, Heat 2: -2.2 m/s

Rank	Heat	Name	Nationality	Time	Notes
1	1	Álex Quiñónez	Ecuador	20.84	Q
2	1	Arturo Ramirez	Venezuela	21.10	Q
3	1	Daniel Grueso	Colombia	21.24	Q
4	1	Andrés Rodríguez	Panama	21.41	q
5	2	Jorge Vides	Brazil	21.48	Q
6	2	Alberth Bravo	Venezuela	21.55	Q
7	2	Bernardo Baloyes	Colombia	21.64	Q
8	1	Stephan James	Guyana	21.68	q
9	2	Arthur Rojas	Bolivia	22.08	
10	2	Jhon Valencia	Ecuador	22.11	
11	2	Fredy Maidana	Paraguay	22.29	
12	2	Andy Martínez	Peru	22.37	
	1	Bruno de Barros	Brazil	DNS	
	1	Jeremy Bascom	Guyana	DNS	
	2	Mateo Edward	Panama	DNS	

Final – July 6
Wind:
+1.8 m/s

Rank	Name	Nationality	Time	Notes
1st place, gold medalist(s)	Álex Quiñónez	Ecuador	20.44	CR
2nd place, silver medalist(s)	Bernardo Baloyes	Colombia	20.71	
3rd place, bronze medalist(s)	Jorge Vides	Brazil	20.71	
4	Arturo Ramirez	Venezuela	20.72	
5	Alberth Bravo	Venezuela	20.96	
6	Daniel Grueso	Colombia	21.19	
7	Stephan James	Guyana	21.35	
8	Andres Rodriguez	Panama	21.75	

=== 400 meters ===
Heats – July 5

Rank	Heat	Name	Nationality	Time	Notes
1	1	Wagner Cardoso	Brazil	46.29	Q
2	1	Freddy Mezones	Venezuela	46.48	Q
3	2	Carlos Lemos	Colombia	46.67	Q
4	1	Stephan James	Guyana	46.70	Q
5	2	José Meléndez	Venezuela	46.73	Q
6	1	Jhon Perlaza	Colombia	47.27	q
7	2	Joel Lynch	Panama	47.53	Q
8	2	Jonathan da Silva	Brazil	47.76	q
9	1	Augusto Stanley	Paraguay	48.10	
10	1	Paulo Herrera	Peru	48.37	
11	2	Rodrigo Montoya	Peru	50.12	

Final – July 5

Rank	Name	Nationality	Time	Notes
1st place, gold medalist(s)	José Meléndez	Venezuela	46.31	
2nd place, silver medalist(s)	Wagner Cardoso	Brazil	46.38	
3rd place, bronze medalist(s)	Stephan James	Guyana	46.47	
4	Carlos Lemos	Colombia	46.78	
5	Jhon Perlaza	Colombia	48.06	
6	Joel Lynch	Panama	48.37	
7	Jonathan da Silva	Brazil	49.93	
	Freddy Mezones	Venezuela	DQ	FS

=== 800 meters ===
Heats – July 6

Rank	Heat	Name	Nationality	Time	Notes
1	1	Lutmar Paes	Brazil	1:49.82	Q
2	1	Rafith Rodríguez	Colombia	1:50.48	Q
3	1	Franco Díaz	Argentina	1:50.87	Q
4	1	Iván López	Chile	1:51.27	q
5	1	Roiman Ramirez	Venezuela	1:51.93	q
6	2	Diego Chargal Gomes	Brazil	1:52.21	Q
7	2	Lucirio Antonio Garrido	Venezuela	1:52.07	Q
8	2	Jhon Sinisterra	Colombia	1:52.45	Q
9	1	Alexander Garay	Peru	1:52.48	
10	2	David Washco	Ecuador	1:53.08	
11	2	Eduardo Gregorio	Uruguay	1:52.93	
12	1	Alex Cisneros	Ecuador	1:55.21	
13	2	Edmundo Díaz	Peru	1:56.73	

Final – July 7

Rank	Name	Nationality	Time	Notes
1st place, gold medalist(s)	Rafith Rodríguez	Colombia	1:46.34	
2nd place, silver medalist(s)	Diego Chargal Gomes	Brazil	1:48.17	
3rd place, bronze medalist(s)	Lutmar Paes	Brazil	1:48.50	
4	Lucirio Antonio Garrido	Venezuela	1:48.83	
5	Jhon Sinisterra	Colombia	1:49.16	
6	Roiman Ramirez	Venezuela	1:50.35	
7	Franco Díaz	Argentina	1:53.89	
	Iván López	Chile	DNS	

=== 1500 meters ===
July 5

Rank	Name	Nationality	Time	Notes
1st place, gold medalist(s)	Jean Carlos Machado	Brazil	3:45.94	
2nd place, silver medalist(s)	Federico Bruno	Argentina	3:45.94	
3rd place, bronze medalist(s)	Iván López	Chile	3:46.00	
4	Alexis Peña	Venezuela	3:46.46	
5	Mauricio Valdivia	Chile	3:46.49	
6	Adriano Soares	Brazil	3:47.40	
7	José Peña	Venezuela	3:47.63	
8	David Washco	Ecuador	3:49.17	
9	Eduardo Gregorio	Uruguay	3:51.40	
10	Fredy Espinosa	Colombia	3:55.23	
11	Alex Cisneros	Ecuador	3:57.63	
12	Miguel Mallma	Peru	3:59.26	

=== 5000 meters ===
July 7

Rank	Name	Nationality	Time	Notes
1st place, gold medalist(s)	Byron Piedra	Ecuador	14:15.35	
2nd place, silver medalist(s)	Víctor Aravena	Chile	14:17.97	
3rd place, bronze medalist(s)	Javier Guarín	Colombia	14:19.82	
4	Leslie Encina	Chile	14:22.62	
5	Javier Carriqueo	Argentina	14:28.00	
6	Andres Camargo	Colombia	14:30.62	
7	Rafael Novais	Brazil	14:33.52	
8	Miguel Barzola	Argentina	14:34.85	
9	Martín Cuestas	Uruguay	14:44.62	
10	José Luis Rojas	Peru	14:45.50	
11	Alexis Peña	Venezuela	14:58.58	
12	Didimo Sánchez	Venezuela	15:12.25	
	Miguel Mallma	Peru	DNS	

=== 10,000 meters ===
July 5

Rank	Name	Nationality	Time	Notes
1st place, gold medalist(s)	Solonei da Silva	Brazil	29:51.79	
2nd place, silver medalist(s)	José Luis Rojas	Peru	30:13.10	
3rd place, bronze medalist(s)	William Naranjo	Colombia	30:19.29	
4	Raúl Pacheco	Peru	30:35.17	
5	Miguel Barzola	Argentina	30:51.27	
6	Leslie Encina	Chile	31:32.01	
7	Didimo Sánchez	Venezuela	32:01.80	
8	Martín Cuestas	Uruguay	32:26.63	
	Daniel Chaves da Silva	Brazil	DNF	
	Javier Guarín	Colombia	DNF	
	Alexis Peña	Venezuela	DNF	

=== 110 meters hurdles ===
July 5
Wind: +1.0 m/s

Rank	Name	Nationality	Time	Notes
1st place, gold medalist(s)	Jorge McFarlane	Peru	13.61	NR
2nd place, silver medalist(s)	Matheus Facho Inocêncio	Brazil	13.67	
3rd place, bronze medalist(s)	Jonathan Mendes	Brazil	13.84	
4	Javier McFarlane	Peru	13.85	
5	Agustín Carrera	Argentina	13.98	
6	Yeison Rivas	Colombia	14.01	
7	Jhon Tamayo	Ecuador	14.28	

=== 400 meters hurdles ===
Heats – July 6

Rank	Heat	Name	Nationality	Time	Notes
1	1	Mahau Suguimati	Brazil	52.02	Q
2	2	Lucirio Francisco Garrido	Venezuela	52.14	Q
3	2	Artur Terezan	Brazil	52.16	Q
4	2	Alejandro Chala	Ecuador	52.17	Q
5	2	José Vicente Guzmán	Colombia	52.23	q
6	1	Andrés Silva	Uruguay	52.34	Q
7	1	Víctor Solarte	Venezuela	52.50	Q
8	1	Yeison Rivas	Colombia	52.60	q
9	1	Jhon Tamayo	Ecuador	52.64	

Final – July 6

Rank	Name	Nationality	Time	Notes
1st place, gold medalist(s)	Mahau Suguimati	Brazil	49.86	
2nd place, silver medalist(s)	Andrés Silva	Uruguay	50.52	
3rd place, bronze medalist(s)	Yeison Rivas	Colombia	51.01	
4	Lucirio Francisco Garrido	Venezuela	51.47	
5	Víctor Solarte	Venezuela	51.62	
6	Artur Terezan	Brazil	52.30	
7	José Vicente Guzmán	Colombia	52.83	
8	Alejandro Chala	Ecuador	53.10	

=== 3000 meters steeplechase ===
July 7

Rank	Name	Nationality	Time	Notes
1st place, gold medalist(s)	José Peña	Venezuela	8:32.01	CR
2nd place, silver medalist(s)	Mauricio Valdivia	Chile	8:44.36	
3rd place, bronze medalist(s)	Gládson Barbosa	Brazil	8:45.10	
4	Gerald Giraldo	Colombia	8:45.14	
5	Luis Orta	Venezuela	8:49.44	
6	Mauricio Franco	Colombia	8:49.70	
7	Jean Carlos Machado	Brazil	9:05.35	
8	Joaquin Arbe	Argentina	9:16.05	
9	Jesús Manuel Yana	Peru	9:22.07	
10	Wilson Matute	Ecuador	9:38.68	

=== 4 × 100 meters relay ===
July 6

Rank	Nation	Competitors	Time	Notes
1st place, gold medalist(s)	Brazil	José Carlos Moreira, Jorge Vides, Jefferson Lucindo, Rebert Firmiano	39.47	
2nd place, silver medalist(s)	Colombia	Isidro Montoya, Vladimir Valencia, Daniel Grueso, Yeison Rivas	39.76	
3rd place, bronze medalist(s)	Venezuela	Jermaine Chirinos, Álvaro Cassiani, Albert Bravo, Alberto Aguilar	39.76	
4	Ecuador	Álex Quiñónez, Luis Morán, Jhon Valencia, Jhon Tamayo	40.11	

=== 4 × 400 meters relay ===
July 7

Rank	Nation	Competitors	Time	Notes
1st place, gold medalist(s)	Venezuela	Arturo Ramírez, Alberto Aguilar, José Meléndez, Freddy Mezones	3:03.64	
2nd place, silver medalist(s)	Colombia	Jhon Perlaza, Carlos Lemos, Rafith Rodríguez, Yeison Rivas	3:06.25	
3rd place, bronze medalist(s)	Brazil	Wagner Cardoso, Jonathan da Silva, Hederson Estefani, Willian Carvalho	3:08.60	
4	Ecuador	Jhon Valencia, Alejandro Chala, Álex Quiñónez, Jhon Tamayo	3:15.61	

=== 20,000 meters walk ===
July 7

Rank	Name	Nationality	Time	Notes
1st place, gold medalist(s)	Caio Bonfim	Brazil	1:24:28.40	
2nd place, silver medalist(s)	Éider Arévalo	Colombia	1:24:36.23	
3rd place, bronze medalist(s)	Andrés Chocho	Ecuador	1:26:20.18	
4	Jorge Stiven Díaz	Colombia	1:27:59.42	
5	Juan Manuel Cano	Argentina	1:30:16.98	
6	Rolando Saquipay	Ecuador	1:30:29.23	
7	Ronald Quispe	Bolivia	1:30:56.73	
	Pavel Chihuán	Peru	DNF	
	Mário dos Santos	Brazil	DQ	

=== High jump ===
July 6

Rank	Name	Nationality	1.95	2.00	2.05	2.10	2.13	2.16	2.19	2.22	2.25	2.28	Result	Notes
1st place, gold medalist(s)	Talles Silva	Brazil	–	–	–	o	–	xxo	xo	o	xx–	x	2.22	
2nd place, silver medalist(s)	Wanner Miller	Colombia	–	–	–	o	–	o	o	xxx			2.19	
2nd place, silver medalist(s)	Guilherme Cobbo	Brazil	–	–	–	–	–	–	o	xxx			2.19	
4	Eure Yánez	Venezuela	–	–	–	xo	–	xo	o	xxx			2.19	
5	Carlos Layoy	Argentina	o	–	–	–	–	xo	xxo	xxx			2.19	
6	Diego Ferrín	Ecuador	–	–	–	o	–	xxo	xxx				2.16	
7	Arturo Chávez	Peru	–	–	–	xo	xxx						2.10	
8	Henry Edmon	Panama	–	o	o	xxx							2.05	
9	Daniel Cortez	Colombia	o	o	xxo	xxx							2.05	
10	Rios Williams	Panama	o	o	xxx								2.00	

=== Pole vault ===
July 5

Rank	Name	Nationality	4.70	4.80	4.90	5.00	5.10	5.20	5.30	5.40	5.50	5.65	5.70	5.83	Result	Notes
1st place, gold medalist(s)	Thiago Braz da Silva	Brazil	–	–	–	–	–	o	o	o	o	xo	xo	xxo	5.83	AR, CR, NR
2nd place, silver medalist(s)	Germán Chiaraviglio	Argentina	–	–	–	–	–	o	–	o	xxx				5.40	
3rd place, bronze medalist(s)	João Gabriel Sousa	Brazil	–	–	–	–	–	–	xxo	o	xxx				5.40	
4	Rubén Benítez	Argentina	–	o	–	xxo	xo	o	xxx						5.20	
5	César Lucumí	Colombia	–	xxo	xxo	xxx									4.90	
	Felipe Fuentes	Chile	–	xxx											NM	
	Walter Viáfara	Colombia	xx–	x											NM	

=== Long jump ===
July 6

Rank	Name	Nationality	#1	#2	#3	#4	#5	#6	Result	Notes
1st place, gold medalist(s)	Mauro Vinícius da Silva	Brazil	x	7.97	8.13	8.02	8.24	8.01	8.24	CR
2nd place, silver medalist(s)	Jorge McFarlane	Peru	8.01w	7.93	x	-	x	x	8.01w	
3rd place, bronze medalist(s)	Irving Saladino	Panama	7.64	x	7.08	7.94	7.68	x	7.94	
4	Tiago da Silva	Brazil	7.91	x	x	x	2.63	x	7.91	
5	Edwin Murillo	Colombia	7.48	7.66	7.86	6.91	7.36	x	7.86	
6	Jhamal Bowen	Panama	7.42	x	x	x	7.54	7.53	7.54	
7	Jhon Murillo	Colombia	x	7.46w	x	–	–	–	7.46w	
8	Javier McFarlane	Peru	7.26	–	7.33	7.34	–	–	7.34	
9	Emiliano Lasa	Uruguay	x	x	7.21				7.21	
10	Georni Jaramillo	Venezuela	x	x	6.82				6.82	

=== Triple jump ===
July 7

Rank	Name	Nationality	#1	#2	#3	#4	#5	#6	Result	Notes
1st place, gold medalist(s)	Jefferson Sabino	Brazil	16.23	x	x	-	16.27	16.73	16.73	
2nd place, silver medalist(s)	Jhon Murillo	Colombia	x	x	?	16.11	16.36w	x	16.36w	
3rd place, bronze medalist(s)	Jonathan Henrique Silva	Brazil	x	x	16.16w	15.99	16.35	16.02	16.35	
4	Ángel Delgado	Venezuela	x	15.91	x	15.99	x	16.17	16.17	
5	Divie Murillo	Colombia	15.4	16.01	15.61	15.84w	x	15.86	16.01	
6	Peter Camacho	Venezuela	15.39	15.75	x	15.47	15.84w	15.07	15.84w	
7	Maximiliano Díaz	Argentina	14.97	x	14.98	x	–	–	14.98	

=== Shot put ===
July 7

Rank	Name	Nationality	#1	#2	#3	#4	#5	#6	Result	Notes
1st place, gold medalist(s)	Germán Lauro	Argentina	20.38	20.33	20.87	x	20.38	x	20.87	CR
2nd place, silver medalist(s)	Darlan Romani	Brazil	x	x	x	19.30	x	19.64	19.64	
3rd place, bronze medalist(s)	Michael Putman	Peru	17.87	x	x	x	18.11	18.73	18.73	
4	Eder Moreno	Colombia	18.48	x	17.90	17.50	x	18.27	18.48	
5	Maximiliano Alonso	Chile	17.20	x	17.29	17.27	x	17.13	17.29	
6	Aldo González	Bolivia	16.65	17.10	16.49	17.22	17.22	17.05	17.22	
7	Levin Moreno	Colombia	14.87	15.01	14.88	x	15.37	15.88	15.88	
8	Juan Caicedo	Ecuador	15.50	15.39	x	15.48	15.88	x	15.88	
	Gustavo de Mendonça	Brazil							DNS	

=== Discus throw ===
July 5

Rank	Name	Nationality	#1	#2	#3	#4	#5	#6	Result	Notes
1st place, gold medalist(s)	Germán Lauro	Argentina	55.32	x	57.35	55.94	55.23	60.45	60.45	
2nd place, silver medalist(s)	Andrés Rossini	Argentina	56.0	56.20	57.16	57.77	57.48	57.09	57.77	
3rd place, bronze medalist(s)	Mauricio Ortega	Colombia	55.26	55.11	57.76	56.65	57.04	57.30	57.76	NU20R
4	Maximiliano Alonso	Chile	x	52.12	55.61	x	x	51.55	55.61	
5	Felipe Lorenzon	Brazil	53.04	52.64	53.29	54.91	x	53.65	54.91	
6	Jesús Parejo	Venezuela	x	52.49	x	53.53	52.04	52.91	53.53	
7	Michael Putman	Peru	x	x	51.96	53.21	x	x	53.21	
8	Juan José Caicedo	Ecuador	51.96	x	x	x	x	x	51.96	
9	Carlos Valle	Brazil	44.64	50.29	51.96				51.96	
10	Levin Moreno	Colombia	x	47.52	47.87				47.87	
11	Rodolfo Casanova	Uruguay	x	46.43	x				46.43	

=== Hammer throw ===
July 6

Rank	Name	Nationality	#1	#2	#3	#4	#5	#6	Result	Notes
1st place, gold medalist(s)	Wagner Domingos	Brazil	x	67.97	69.60	69.47	70.71	71.36	71.36	
2nd place, silver medalist(s)	Juan Ignacio Cerra	Argentina	67.78	68.08	x	66.24	x	69.33	69.33	
3rd place, bronze medalist(s)	Allan Wolski	Brazil	66.25	65.97	62.99	65.84	65.10	x	66.25	
4	Fabián di Paolo	Argentina	62.62	x	x	x	62.40	x	62.62	
5	Fabián Serna	Colombia	x	57.23	58.44	x	x	60.70	60.70	
6	Guillermo Braulio	Ecuador	56.76	x	58.22	57.67	x	x	58.22	

=== Javelin throw ===
July 7

Rank	Name	Nationality	#1	#2	#3	#4	#5	#6	Result	Notes
1st place, gold medalist(s)	Víctor Fatecha	Paraguay	72.21	75.51	x	76.14	x	x	76.14	
2nd place, silver medalist(s)	Arley Ibargüen	Colombia	72.43	75.28	74.11	73.20	73.09	76.13	76.13	
3rd place, bronze medalist(s)	Braian Toledo	Argentina	73.59	75.33	74.53	72.61	74.49	x	75.33	
4	Júlio César de Oliveira	Brazil	69.21	x	x	74.05	75.20	70.68	75.20	
5	Paulo Enrique da Silva	Brazil	69.33	66.90	70.46	71.61	x	70.25	71.61	
6	Noraldo Palacios	Colombia	x	67.41	71.26	x	66.95	69.14	71.26	
7	Edgar Jara	Paraguay	71.25	70.98	x	69.89	69.02	70.87	71.25	
8	Leslain Baird	Guyana	x	64.94	x	x	59.39	x	64.94	
9	José Escobar	Ecuador	59.83	x	60.78				60.78	

=== Decathlon ===
July 5–6

The highest mark recorded in each event is highlighted in yellow

Rank	Athlete	Nationality	100m	LJ	SP	HJ	400m	110m H	DT	PV	JT	1500m	Points	Notes
1st place, gold medalist(s)	Román Gastaldi	Argentina	11.36	7.15	12.82	1.92	50.63	15.70	41.78	4.20	59.10	4:52.57	7273	
2nd place, silver medalist(s)	Renato Átila	Brazil	11.74	6.88	14.12	1.95	51.95	15.15	44.46	4.60	45.87	4:59.77	7175	
3rd place, bronze medalist(s)	Óscar Campos	Venezuela	11.38	6.73	12.17	1.77	50.67	15.66	38.43	4.20	57.11	4:37.39	7026	
4	José Lemos	Colombia	11.73	6.55	14.73	1.83	53.22	15.90	44.88	3.50	69.46	4:58.28	6953	
5	Fernando Korniejczuk	Argentina	11.70	6.54	13.26	1.86	52.95	15.40	37.92	4.30	53.85	5:01.21	6789	
6	Ricardo Herrada	Venezuela	11.63	6.82	12.17	1.83	50.37	15.33	36.56	4.20	54.25	DNF	6315	
	Oscar Mina	Ecuador	11.55	6.23	11.78	1.83	56.8	DNF	34.84	NM	41.56	DNS	DNF	
	Luis Alberto Araújo	Brazil	11.13	7.16	14.49	1.89	49.31	14.87	NM	NM	DNS	–	DNF	
	Alcides Córdoba	Colombia	11.80	6.62	10.39	1.80	DNF	DNS	–	–	–	–	DNF	

== Women's results ==
=== 100 meters ===
Heats – July 5
Wind:
Heat 1: -1.8 m/s, Heat 2: -1.6 m/s

Rank	Heat	Name	Nationality	Time	Notes
1	2	Ana Claudia Lemos	Brazil	11.45	Q
2	1	Franciela Krasucki	Brazil	11.46	Q
3	1	Alejandra Idrobo	Colombia	11.77	Q
4	2	Eliecith Palacios	Colombia	11.78	Q
5	1	Erika Chávez	Ecuador	11.79	Q
6	1	Victoria Woodward	Argentina	11.93	q
7	2	Celene Cevallos	Ecuador	12.15	Q
8	2	Lexabeth Hidalgo	Venezuela	12.42	q
9	1	Paola Mautino	Peru	12.47	
10	2	Ruth Hunt	Panama	12.74	
	1	Isidora Jiménez	Chile	DNS	

Final – July 5
Wind:
+0.1 m/s

Rank	Name	Nationality	Time	Notes
1st place, gold medalist(s)	Ana Claudia Lemos	Brazil	11.21	
2nd place, silver medalist(s)	Franciela Krasucki	Brazil	11.27	
3rd place, bronze medalist(s)	Eliecith Palacios	Colombia	11.56	
4	Erika Chávez	Ecuador	11.64	
5	Alejandra Idrobo	Colombia	11.64	
6	Victoria Woodward	Argentina	11.87	
7	Celene Cevallos	Ecuador	11.95	
8	Lexabeth Hidalgo	Venezuela	12.06	

=== 200 meters ===
Heats – July 6
Wind:
Heat 1: -1.5 m/s, Heat 2: -2.4 m/s

Rank	Heat	Name	Nationality	Time	Notes
1	1	Nercely Soto	Venezuela	23.59	Q
2	2	Ana Cláudia Lemos	Brazil	23.69	Q
3	1	Erika Chávez	Ecuador	23.72	Q
4	2	Isidora Jiménez	Chile	23.93	Q
5	1	Rosângela Santos	Brazil	24.14	Q
6	1	Merlin Palacios	Colombia	24.21	q
7	1	Fernanda Mackenna	Chile	24.25	q
8	2	Carmen Vergara	Colombia	24.34	Q
9	2	Ruth Hunt	Panama	24.78	
10	1	Victoria Woodward	Argentina	24.93	
11	2	Lady Barona	Ecuador	25.00	
12	2	Paola Mautino	Peru	25.51	

Final – July 6
Wind:
+3.4 m/s

Rank	Name	Nationality	Time	Notes
1st place, gold medalist(s)	Ana Cláudia Lemos	Brazil	22.70	
2nd place, silver medalist(s)	Nercely Soto	Venezuela	23.05	
3rd place, bronze medalist(s)	Erika Chávez	Ecuador	23.10	
4	Isidora Jiménez	Chile	23.34	
5	Merlin Palacios	Colombia	23.65	
6	Carmen Vergara	Colombia	23.83	
7	Fernanda Mackenna	Chile	23.91	
	Rosângela Santos	Brazil	DNS	

=== 400 meters ===
July 5

Rank	Name	Nationality	Time	Notes
1st place, gold medalist(s)	Joelma Sousa	Brazil	52.25	
2nd place, silver medalist(s)	Nercely Soto	Venezuela	53.96	
3rd place, bronze medalist(s)	Jennifer Padilla	Colombia	54.28	
4	Celene Cevallos	Ecuador	55.63	
5	Cristiane Silva	Brazil	55.97	
6	Maitte Torres	Peru	56.25	
7	Rosa Escobar	Colombia	56.85	
8	Emileth Pirela	Venezuela	56.89	

=== 800 meters ===
July 7

Rank	Name	Nationality	Time	Notes
1st place, gold medalist(s)	Rosibel García	Colombia	2:02.45	
2nd place, silver medalist(s)	Flávia de Lima	Brazil	2:02.94	
3rd place, bronze medalist(s)	Andrea Ferris	Panama	2:03.57	
4	Christiane dos Santos	Brazil	2:06.61	
5	Mariana Borelli	Argentina	2:08.96	
6	María Caballero	Paraguay	2:09.67	NR
7	Yadira Méndez	Ecuador	2:10.91	
8	Rosa Escobar	Colombia	2:11.48	
9	Andrea Calderón	Ecuador	2:12.72	
10	María Osorio	Venezuela	2:13.36	
11	Eliona Delgado	Peru	2:14.12	

=== 1500 meters ===
July 5

Rank	Name	Nationality	Time	Notes
1st place, gold medalist(s)	Rosibel García	Colombia	4:15.84	CR
2nd place, silver medalist(s)	Muriel Coneo	Colombia	4:15.84	CR
3rd place, bronze medalist(s)	Andrea Ferris	Panama	4:16.34	
4	Tatiana Araújo	Brazil	4:21.41	
5	Belén Casetta	Argentina	4:21.94	
6	María Caballero	Paraguay	4:22.35	
7	Eliona Delgado	Peru	4:22.55	
8	Christiane Ritz	Brazil	4:23.86	
9	Wilma Arizapana	Peru	4:30.90	
10	María Osorio	Venezuela	4:33.43	
11	Mariana Borelli	Argentina	4:38.30	

=== 5000 meters ===
July 7

Rank	Name	Nationality	Time	Notes
1st place, gold medalist(s)	Carolina Tabares	Colombia	16:09.82	
2nd place, silver medalist(s)	Gladys Tejeda	Peru	16:19.39	
3rd place, bronze medalist(s)	Wilma Arizapana	Peru	16:22.82	
4	Tatiele Roberta de Carvalho	Brazil	16:34.59	
5	Diana Suarez	Colombia	16:47.40	
6	Diana Landi	Ecuador	17:18.95	
	Adriana Aparecida da Silva	Brazil	DNS	

=== 10,000 meters ===
July 6

Rank	Name	Nationality	Time	Notes
1st place, gold medalist(s)	Cruz da Silva	Brazil	34:44.14	
2nd place, silver medalist(s)	Carolina Tabares	Colombia	34:47.59	
3rd place, bronze medalist(s)	Diana Landi	Ecuador	35:12.53	
4	Rocío Cantara	Peru	35:19.71	
5	Adriana Aparecida da Silva	Brazil	35:49.80	
6	Leidy Tobon	Colombia	35:58.57	
7	Nicolasa Condori	Peru	36:20.59	
	Nadia Rodríguez	Argentina	DNF	

=== 100 meters hurdles ===
July 5
Wind: +2.0 m/s

Rank	Name	Nationality	Time	Notes
1st place, gold medalist(s)	Lina Florez	Colombia	13.09	
2nd place, silver medalist(s)	Brigitte Merlano	Colombia	13.20	
3rd place, bronze medalist(s)	Fabiana Morães	Brazil	13.21	
4	Giselle de Albuquerque	Brazil	13.90	
5	Génesis Romero	Venezuela	14.17	
6	Nelsibeth Villalobos	Venezuela	14.19	
7	Diana Bazalar	Peru	14.31	
	Yuliana Angulo	Ecuador	DNS	

=== 400 meters hurdles ===
July 6

Rank	Name	Nationality	Time	Notes
1st place, gold medalist(s)	Liliane Fernandes	Brazil	58.03	
2nd place, silver medalist(s)	Déborah Rodríguez	Uruguay	58.06	
3rd place, bronze medalist(s)	Fernanda Tavares	Brazil	58.83	
4	Yadira Moreno	Colombia	59.26	
5	Princesa Oliveros	Colombia	59.44	
6	Estefani Balladares	Venezuela	1:01.14	
7	Kaila Smith	Panama	1:02.28	
	Maitte Torres	Peru	DNF	

=== 3000 meters steeplechase ===
July 7

Rank	Name	Nationality	Time	Notes
1st place, gold medalist(s)	Erika Lima	Brazil	9:54.97	
2nd place, silver medalist(s)	Rolanda Bell	Panama	10:04.01	
3rd place, bronze medalist(s)	Muriel Coneo	Colombia	10:09.91	
4	Zulema Arenas	Peru	10:12.72	NR , NU20R
5	Cynthia Paucar	Peru	10:35.70	
6	Belén Casetta	Argentina	10:51.85	
	Sabine Heitling	Brazil	DNS	

=== 4 × 100 meters relay ===
July 6

Rank	Nation	Competitors	Time	Notes
1st place, gold medalist(s)	Brazil	Ana Cláudia Lemos, Franciela Krasucki, Jailma de Lima, Evelyn dos Santos	43.37	
2nd place, silver medalist(s)	Colombia	Eliecith Palacios, Alejandra Idrobo, Lina Flórez, Yomara Hinestroza	44.01	
3rd place, bronze medalist(s)	Venezuela	Lexabeth Hidalgo, Nercely Soto, Génesis Romero, Nelsibeth Villalobos	45.44	
4	Chile	Isidora Jiménez, Fernanda Mackenna, Viviana Olivares, Paula Goñi	45.53	
5	Ecuador	Erika Chávez, Celene Cevallos, Yuliana Angulo, Lady Barona	45.93	
6	Panama	Ruth Hunt, Kaila Smith, Kashany Rios, Jennifer Clayton	46.98	

=== 4 × 400 meters relay ===
July 7

Rank	Nation	Competitors	Time	Notes
1st place, gold medalist(s)	Brazil	Joelma Sousa, Evelyn dos Santos, Liliane Fernandes, Jailma de Lima	3:35.37	
2nd place, silver medalist(s)	Colombia	Jennifer Padilla, Lina Flórez, Rosibel García, Yaneth Largacha	3:36.29	
3rd place, bronze medalist(s)	Ecuador	Erika Chávez, Celene Cevallos, Yadira Méndez, Nicol Minota	3:43.01	
4	Venezuela	Nercely Soto, Emileth Pirela, Nelsibeth Villalobos, Estefani Balladares	3:46.25	

=== 20,000 meters walk ===
July 6

Rank	Name	Nationality	Time	Notes
1st place, gold medalist(s)	Sandra Arenas	Colombia	1:37:46.17	
2nd place, silver medalist(s)	Arabelly Orjuela	Colombia	1:38:59.78	
3rd place, bronze medalist(s)	Wendy Cornejo	Bolivia	1:39:43.89	
4	Ángela Castro	Bolivia	1:42:22.15	
5	Elianay da Silva	Brazil	1:44:53.84	
6	Magaly Bonilla	Ecuador	1:46:02.55	
	Kimberly García	Peru	DQ	
	Érica de Sena	Brazil	DQ	

=== High jump ===
July 7

Rank	Name	Nationality	1.60	1.65	1.70	1.73	1.76	1.79	1.83	Result	Notes
1st place, gold medalist(s)	Mônica de Freitas	Brazil	–	–	o	o	o	xxo	xxx	1.79	
2nd place, silver medalist(s)	Anyi García	Colombia	o	o	xo	o	o	xxx		1.76	
3rd place, bronze medalist(s)	Kashany Ríos	Panama	–	o	o	o	xxx			1.73	
3rd place, bronze medalist(s)	Aline Fernanda Santos	Brazil	–	–	o	o	xxx			1.73	
5	Yulimar Rojas	Venezuela	–	–	o	xxo	xxx			1.73	
6	Gabriela Saravia	Peru	o	o	o	xxx				1.70	
7	Nulfa Palacios	Colombia	o	xo	xxx					1.65	

=== Pole vault ===
July 6

Rank	Name	Nationality	3.30	3.40	3.50	3.60	3.80	3.90	4.00	4.15	4.20	4.25	4.35	Result	Notes
1st place, gold medalist(s)	Karla da Silva	Brazil	–	–	–	–	–	–	–	x–	o	–	xxx	4.20	
2nd place, silver medalist(s)	Valeria Chiaraviglio	Argentina	–	–	–	–	o	–	o	o	–	xxx		4.15	
3rd place, bronze medalist(s)	Milena Agudelo	Colombia	–	–	–	–	xxo	o	xxx					3.90	
4	Catalina Amarilla	Paraguay	o	xo	xo	xxx								3.50	
	Jessica Diana Fu	Peru	–	–	–	xxx								NM	
	Joana Costa	Brazil	–	–	–	–	xxx							NM	
	Giseth Montaño	Colombia												DNS	

=== Long jump ===
July 6

Rank	Name	Nationality	#1	#2	#3	#4	#5	#6	Result	Notes
1st place, gold medalist(s)	Macarena Reyes	Chile	6.24	6.12	6.38	6.43	x	6.54	6.54	
2nd place, silver medalist(s)	Keila Costa	Brazil	x	6.43w	6.42w	x	x	6.49	6.49	
3rd place, bronze medalist(s)	Jéssica Carolina dos Reis	Brazil	x	x	6.08w	6.49w	x	x	6.49w	
4	Jennifer Clayton	Panama	6.02	6.36w	6.18	6.31w	6.10w	6.12	6.36w	NR
5	Yosiris Urrutia	Colombia	x	6.28w	6.36w	x	x	x	6.36w	
6	Munich Tovar	Venezuela	x	6.23w	6.26w	5.91	6.31	x	6.31	
7	Yulimar Rojas	Venezuela	5.89w	5.37	5.82w	5.84w	5.98	6.18	6.18	
8	Paola Mautino	Peru	5.28w	6.13	5.80	5.93	5.78w	3.76w	6.13	
9	Gissely Landazury	Colombia	5.69w	5.68	x				5.69w	
10	Silvana Segura	Peru	x	5.67w	5.46w				5.67w	
11	Yuliana Angulo	Ecuador	x	5.51w	x				5.51w	
12	Mayra Chila	Ecuador	5.15w	x	x				5.15w	

=== Triple jump ===
July 5

Rank	Name	Nationality	#1	#2	#3	#4	#5	#6	Result	Notes
1st place, gold medalist(s)	Keila Costa	Brazil	x	13.97	x	14.21w	–	–	14.21w	
2nd place, silver medalist(s)	Yosiris Urrutia	Colombia	13.21	13.92	13.65w	13.85	13.79	13.75w	13.92	
3rd place, bronze medalist(s)	Gissely Landazury	Colombia	x	13.40	13.60	13.41	13.71	13.6	13.71	
4	Yudelsi González	Venezuela	12.57w	13.16	x	13.11	12.88	x	13.16	
5	Gabriele dos Santos	Brazil	12.91	13.12	11.98	x	13.13	x	13.13	
6	Silvana Segura	Peru	12.04	x	x	12.71	x	x	12.71	
7	Mayra Chila	Ecuador	12.52	12.49w	x	11.17w	x	–	12.52	
8	Mayra Pachito	Ecuador	x	12.09w	–	–	–	–	12.09w	

=== Shot put ===
July 6

Rank	Name	Nationality	#1	#2	#3	#4	#5	#6	Result	Notes
1st place, gold medalist(s)	Geisa Arcanjo	Brazil	16.97	16.83	17.66	17.35	18.27	x	18.27	
2nd place, silver medalist(s)	Sandra Lemos	Colombia	16.32	16.78	17.16	17.56	16.37	17.72	17.72	
3rd place, bronze medalist(s)	Ahymará Espinoza	Venezuela	16.67	17.47	x	x	16.91	17.35	17.47	NR
4	Anyela Rivas	Colombia	15.75	16.35	x	16.58	x	16.89	16.89	
5	Keely Medeiros	Brazil	x	16.72	16.86	x	x	15.91	16.86	
6	Giohanny Rojas	Venezuela	13.63	x	x	13.80	x	13.81	13.81	

=== Discus throw ===
July 5

Rank	Name	Nationality	#1	#2	#3	#4	#5	#6	Result	Notes
1st place, gold medalist(s)	Fernanda Raquel Borges	Brazil	57.84	x	x	58.53	60.79	x	60.79	
2nd place, silver medalist(s)	Rocío Comba	Argentina	55.66	56.92	x	58.29	58.75	x	58.75	
3rd place, bronze medalist(s)	Karen Gallardo	Chile	52.47	53.74	53.25	54.39	57.04	55.88	57.04	
4	Johana Martínez	Colombia	54.25	x	x	x	55.43	54.3	55.43	
5	Andressa de Morais	Brazil	53.66	49.88	x	49.68	51.57	x	53.66	
6	Luz Montaño	Colombia	x	44.96	53.43	x	x	50.93	53.43	
7	Aixa Middleton	Panama	49.43	49.12	x	47.86	46.77	51.02	51.02	
8	María Cubillán	Venezuela	x	49.86	49.27	48.29	x	48.55	49.86	

=== Hammer throw ===
July 5

Rank	Name	Nationality	#1	#2	#3	#4	#5	#6	Result	Notes
1st place, gold medalist(s)	Rosa Rodríguez	Venezuela	64.03	x	x	61.55	x	68.38	68.38	
2nd place, silver medalist(s)	Johana Moreno	Colombia	x	64.19	66.01	67.22	x	63.05	67.22	
3rd place, bronze medalist(s)	Jennifer Dahlgren	Argentina	x	x	65.82	64.92	x	x	65.82	
4	Odette Palma	Chile	59.72	61.83	61.37	x	x	59.11	61.83	
5	Ana Paula Pereira	Brazil	60.78	57.62	59.72	x	61.39	60.12	61.39	
6	Valeria Chiliquinga	Ecuador	59.75	57.30	59.89	58.86	60.58	x	60.58	
7	Zuleima Mina	Ecuador	x	58.14	56.95	x	58.88	57.55	58.88	
8	Carla Michel	Brazil	58.47	x	x	x	x	x	58.47	
9	Johana Ramírez	Colombia	43.71	49.39	53.70				53.70	

=== Javelin throw ===
July 6

Rank	Name	Nationality	#1	#2	#3	#4	#5	#6	Result	Notes
1st place, gold medalist(s)	Flor Ruiz	Colombia	x	x	60.23	59.30	x	57.78	60.23	CR
2nd place, silver medalist(s)	Laila Ferrer e Silva	Brazil	54.70	57.19	58.80	52.54	54.71	54.40	58.80	
3rd place, bronze medalist(s)	Jucilene de Lima	Brazil	57.73	57.10	57.70	55.14	56.27	57.55	57.73	
4	Leryn Franco	Paraguay	x	52.45	52.11	54.30	49.94	54.79	54.79	
5	María Lucelly Murillo	Colombia	54.61	51.98	x	54.19	x	54.02	54.61	
6	Barbara López	Argentina	50.67	47.37	48.78	x	x	x	50.67	

=== Heptathlon ===
July 5–6

The highest mark recorded in each event is highlighted in yellow

Rank	Athlete	Nationality	100m H	HJ	SP	200m	LJ	JT	800m	Points	Notes
1st place, gold medalist(s)	Tamara de Sousa	Brazil	14.17	1.75	14.29	24.68	5.82	43.33	2:40.94	5685	
2nd place, silver medalist(s)	Ana Camila Pirelli	Paraguay	14.35	1.60	13.08	24.69	5.69	41.58	2:18.59	5610	
3rd place, bronze medalist(s)	Agustina Zerboni	Argentina	14.05	1.60	11.23	25.41	5.49	36.81	2:18.25	5317	
4	Carolina Castillo	Chile	14.40	1.66	10.03	25.88	5.80	32.88	2:22.85	5173	
5	Nasli Perea	Colombia	14.94	1.63	11.56	27.12	5.54	42.42	2:42.68	4924	
6	Sandra Dennis	Colombia	14.97	1.54	10.03	26.38	5.84	30.41	2:37.28	4887	
7	Melry Caldeira	Brazil	14.54	1.57	12.22	26.89	5.45	30.91	2:34.76	4815	
8	Melissa Arana	Peru	15.77	1.57	10.42	26.85	5.37	32.79	2:25.32	4671	
9	Guillercy González	Venezuela	15.28	1.72	11.47	26.09	5.68	34.86	DNF	4421	
