= 2016 Ibero-American Championships in Athletics – Results =

These are the official results of the 2016 Ibero-American Championships in Athletics which took place on 14–16 May 2016 in Rio de Janeiro, Brazil.

== Men's results ==
=== 100 meters ===
Heats – 14 May
Wind:
Heat 1: +0.3 m/s, Heat 2: +0.7 m/s, Heat 3: -0.8 m/s, Heat 4: -1.1 m/s

Rank	Heat	Name	Nationality	Time	Notes
1	2	Hayden Kovacic*	Australia	10.36	Q
2	1	Jorge Vides	Brazil	10.37	Q
2	2	Yohandris Andújar	Dominican Republic	10.37	Q
4	2	Diego Palomeque	Colombia	10.38	Q
5	3	Bruno de Barros	Brazil	10.43	Q
6	1	Stanly del Carmen	Dominican Republic	10.44	Q
7	4	Andy Martínez	Peru	10.46	Q
8	3	César Yuniel Ruiz	Cuba	10.56	Q
9	1	Diogo Antunes	Portugal	10.57	Q
10	3	Carlos Nascimento	Portugal	10.58	Q
11	3	Bruno Rojas	Bolivia	10.62	q
12	1	Rolando Palacios	Honduras	10.63	q
12	2	Joseph Norales	Honduras	10.63	q
12	2	Arián Olmos Téllez	Spain	10.63	
12	3	Ángel David Rodríguez	Spain	10.63	q
16	4	Yaniel Carrero	Cuba	10.65	Q
17	3	Alexis Nieves	Venezuela	10.76	
18	1	Holder da Silva	Guinea-Bissau	10.77	
19	1	Franco Boccardo	Chile	10.78	
20	4	Yeiker Mendoza	Venezuela	10.83	Q
21	2	Kevin Oliveira	Angola	10.85	
21	2	Frank Sánchez	Peru	10.85	
23	4	Enrique Polanco	Chile	10.88	
24	1	Christopher Ortiz	Paraguay	10.95	
25	4	Osvaldo Alexandre	Angola	11.12	
26	4	Jonh Zavala	Paraguay	11.22	
	4	Álex Quiñónez	Ecuador	DNS	

Semifinals – 14 May
Wind:
Heat 1: +0.4 m/s, Heat 2: +0.8 m/s

Rank	Heat	Name	Nationality	Time	Notes
1	1	Diego Palomeque	Colombia	10.28	Q
2	1	Bruno de Barros	Brazil	10.28	Q
3	1	Yohandris Andújar	Dominican Republic	10.33	Q
3	2	César Yuniel Ruiz	Cuba	10.33	Q
5	1	Hayden Kovacic*	Australia	10.35	q
5	2	Andy Martínez	Peru	10.35	Q
7	2	Stanly del Carmen	Dominican Republic	10.36	Q
8	2	Jorge Vides	Brazil	10.37	q
9	1	Yaniel Carrero	Cuba	10.41	
10	2	Ángel David Rodríguez	Spain	10.45	
11	2	Rolando Palacios	Honduras	10.46	
12	2	Diogo Antunes	Portugal	10.50	
13	1	Joseph Norales	Honduras	10.51	
14	1	Carlos Nascimento	Portugal	10.52	
15	1	Bruno Rojas	Bolivia	10.54	
16	2	Yeiker Mendoza	Venezuela	10.62	

Final – 14 May
Wind: +0.4 m/s

Rank	Lane	Name	Nationality	Time	Notes
1st place, gold medalist(s)	9	Stanly del Carmen	Dominican Republic	10.27	
2nd place, silver medalist(s)	6	Bruno de Barros	Brazil	10.28	
3rd place, bronze medalist(s)	4	Diego Palomeque	Colombia	10.30	
4	7	César Yuniel Ruiz	Cuba	10.30	
5	8	Yohandris Andújar	Dominican Republic	10.33	
6	3	Jorge Vides	Brazil	10.36	
7	5	Andy Martínez	Peru	10.39	
	2	Hayden Kovacic*	Australia	10.46	

=== 200 meters ===
Heats – 15 May
Wind:
Heat 1: +0.8 m/s, Heat 2: +0.2 m/s, Heat 3: 0.0 m/s, Heat 4: +1.1 m/s

Rank	Heat	Name	Nationality	Time	Notes
1	3	Yancarlos Martínez	Dominican Republic	20.57	Q
2	1	Roberto Skyers	Cuba	20.69	Q
3	3	Bruno Hortelano	Spain	20.72	Q, SB
4	2	Bruno de Barros	Brazil	20.82	Q
5	2	Bernardo Baloyes	Colombia	20.84	Q
6	1	David Lima	Portugal	20.87	Q
7	2	Reynier Mena	Cuba	20.93	Q
8	3	Arturo Ramírez	Venezuela	21.15	Q
9	4	Aldemir da Silva Júnior	Brazil	21.20	Q
10	1	Bruno Rojas	Bolivia	21.23	Q
11	4	Stanly del Carmen	Dominican Republic	21.24	Q
12	4	Rolando Palacios	Honduras	21.26	Q
13	3	Fredy Maidana	Paraguay	21.30	q
14	1	Mahamat Goubaye Youssouf*	Chad	21.39	q
15	4	André Costa	Portugal	21.45	q
16	1	Alberto Gavaldá	Spain	21.53	q
17	2	Joseph Norales	Honduras	21.67	
18	1	Rafael Vásquez	Venezuela	21.68	
19	2	Holder da Silva	Guinea-Bissau	21.90	
20	2	Kevin Oliveira	Angola	21.95	
21	4	Jonh Zavala	Paraguay	22.11	
22	3	Mauro Gaspar	Angola	22.38	
23	3	Gary Robinson	Costa Rica	23.29	
	1	Andy Martínez	Peru	DNS	
	4	Frank Sánchez	Peru	DNS	
	4	Álex Quiñónez	Ecuador	DNS	

Semifinals – 15 May
Wind:
Heat 1: +1.6 m/s, Heat 2: -0.2 m/s

Rank	Heat	Name	Nationality	Time	Notes
1	1	Yancarlos Martínez	Dominican Republic	20.38	Q
2	1	Bruno Hortelano	Spain	20.52	Q, SB
3	2	Bruno de Barros	Brazil	20.56	Q
4	1	Aldemir da Silva Júnior	Brazil	20.59	Q
5	1	Reynier Mena	Cuba	20.62	q
6	1	David Lima	Portugal	20.79	q
7	2	Bernardo Baloyes	Colombia	20.91	Q
8	1	Rolando Palacios	Honduras	20.97	
9	2	Arturo Ramírez	Venezuela	21.09	Q
10	1	Fredy Maidana	Paraguay	21.21	
11	2	André Costa	Portugal	21.42	
12	1	Mahamat Goubaye Youssouf*	Chad	21.44	
	2	Stanly del Carmen	Dominican Republic	DNF	
	2	Roberto Skyers	Cuba	DNF	
	2	Alberto Gavaldá	Spain	DNS	
	2	Bruno Rojas	Bolivia	DNS	

Final – 16 May
Wind: +0.3 m/s

Rank	Lane	Name	Nationality	Time	Notes
1st place, gold medalist(s)	6	Yancarlos Martínez	Dominican Republic	20.19	PB
2nd place, silver medalist(s)	5	Bruno Hortelano	Spain	20.48	SB
3rd place, bronze medalist(s)	4	Bruno de Barros	Brazil	20.54	
4	7	Bernardo Baloyes	Colombia	20.60	
5	3	Aldemir da Silva Júnior	Brazil	20.71	
6	2	Reynier Mena	Cuba	20.73	
7	1	David Lima	Portugal	20.88	
8	8	Arturo Ramírez	Venezuela	21.13	

=== 400 meters ===
Heats – 14 May

Rank	Heat	Name	Nationality	Time	Notes
1	1	Yoandris Lescay	Cuba	45.65	Q
2	2	Luguelín Santos	Dominican Republic	45.73	Q
3	2	Pedro Luiz de Oliveira	Brazil	45.96	Q
4	2	Jhon Perlaza	Colombia	46.15	Q
5	1	Carlos Lemos	Colombia	46.28	Q
6	1	Hugo de Sousa	Brazil	46.30	Q
7	2	Williams Collazo	Cuba	46.41	q
8	1	Sergio Aldea	Chile	46.89	q
9	1	Gustavo Cuesta	Dominican Republic	46.90	
10	2	Sergio Germain	Chile	47.18	
11	2	Brayan Erazo	Peru	47.72	
12	1	Luis Saavedra	Peru	48.46	
13	2	Ayman Othman*	Saudi Arabia	49.44	
14	1	Nilo Alvarenga	Paraguay	50.48	
15	1	Hederson Estefani*	Brazil	1:09.54	
	2	Ronald Alexis Moreno	El Salvador	DNS	

Final – 15 May

Rank	Lane	Name	Nationality	Time	Notes
1st place, gold medalist(s)	6	Yoandris Lescay	Cuba	45.36	
2nd place, silver medalist(s)	5	Luguelín Santos	Dominican Republic	45.58	
3rd place, bronze medalist(s)	3	Pedro Luiz de Oliveira	Brazil	45.64	
4	7	Hugo de Sousa	Brazil	45.69	
5	8	Jhon Perlaza	Colombia	45.81	
6	4	Carlos Lemos	Colombia	45.84	
7	2	Williams Collazo	Cuba	45.92	
8	1	Sergio Aldea	Chile	46.42	

=== 800 meters ===
Heats – 14 May

Rank	Heat	Name	Nationality	Time	Notes
1	2	Brandon Johnson*	United States	1:46.43	Q
2	2	Lutimar Paes	Brazil	1:46.46	Q
3	1	Kleberson Davide	Brazil	1:46.70	Q
4	2	Leandro Paris	Argentina	1:47.18	Q, PB
5	1	Lucirio Antonio Garrido	Venezuela	1:47.85	Q
6	1	Tayron Reyes	Dominican Republic	1:49.26	Q
7	1	Jonathan Bolados	Chile	1:49.26	q
8	2	Mauro Zúñiga	Chile	1:51.35	q
9	1	Ronald Alexis Moreno	El Salvador	1:52.91	
10	2	Gerardo Moreno	Uruguay	1:56.44	
11	1	Frangueira Fernando	Angola	2:07.30	

Final – 15 May

Rank	Name	Nationality	Time	Notes
1st place, gold medalist(s)	Lutimar Paes	Brazil	1:45.42	
2nd place, silver medalist(s)	Kleberson Davide	Brazil	1:45.79	
	Brandon Johnson*	United States	1:46.12	
3rd place, bronze medalist(s)	Lucirio Antonio Garrido	Venezuela	1:46.72	
4	Tayron Reyes	Dominican Republic	1:47.28	NR
5	Jonathan Bolados	Chile	1:50.04	
6	Leandro Paris	Argentina	1:51.53	
7	Mauro Zúñiga	Chile	1:52.60	

=== 1500 meters ===
16 May

Rank	Name	Nationality	Time	Notes
1st place, gold medalist(s)	Iván López	Chile	3:38.64	
2nd place, silver medalist(s)	Carlos Díaz	Chile	3:39.20	
3rd place, bronze medalist(s)	Víctor Corrales	Spain	3:39.60	
4	Carlos Santos	Brazil	3:41.45	
5	Freddy Cáceres	Colombia	3:42.92	
6	Joaquin Arbe	Argentina	3:44.10	
7	Winton Palma	Venezuela	3:49.39	
8	Eduardo Gregorio	Uruguay	3:56.11	
	Brandon Johnson*	United States	3:57.03	
9	Gerardo Martino	Uruguay	3:57.08	
	René Champi	Peru	DNS	
	Carlos Díaz	Colombia	DNS	
	Jean Machado	Brazil	DNS	
	Mario Pacay	Guatemala	DNS	

=== 3000 meters ===
14 May

Rank	Name	Nationality	Time	Notes
1st place, gold medalist(s)	Iván López	Chile	7:52.53	
2nd place, silver medalist(s)	Carlos Díaz	Chile	7:54.31	
3rd place, bronze medalist(s)	Éderson Pereira	Brazil	7:56.20	
4	Andre de Santana	Brazil	8:00.61	
5	Freddy Cáceres	Colombia	8:04.99	
6	Iván Darío González	Colombia	8:08.39	
7	René Champi	Peru	8:15.11	
8	Daniel Toroya	Bolivia	8:16.36	
9	Cristhian Zamora	Uruguay	8:16.58	
10	Jean Pérez	Bolivia	8:20.09	
11	Winton Palma	Venezuela	8:21.67	
12	Willian Santos	Brazil	8:36.91	

=== 5000 meters ===
16 May

Rank	Name	Nationality	Time	Notes
1st place, gold medalist(s)	Altobeli da Silva	Brazil	13:53.48	
2nd place, silver medalist(s)	Daniel Mateo	Spain	13:58.11	
3rd place, bronze medalist(s)	Nicolás Cuestas	Uruguay	13:58.60	PB
4	Martín Cuestas	Uruguay	13:59.53	PB
5	Luis Ostos	Peru	14:04.87	
6	Mario Pacay	Guatemala	14:04.94	
7	José Luis Rojas	Peru	14:19.14	
8	Luis Orta	Venezuela	14:39.44	
9	Iván Darío González	Colombia	14:50.36	
10	Daniel Toroya	Bolivia	14:56.83	
11	Jean Pérez	Bolivia	15:04.67	
	Éderson Pereira	Brazil	DNF	
	José Peña	Venezuela	DNS	
	Roberto Tello	Chile	DNS	

=== 110 meters hurdles ===
Heats – 15 May
Wind:
Heat 1: -1.2 m/s, Heat 2: +0.1 m/s

Rank	Heat	Name	Nationality	Time	Notes
1	2	Jorge McFarlane	Peru	13.67	Q
2	1	Javier McFarlane	Peru	13.76	Q
3	1	Eduardo de Deus	Brazil	13.78	Q
4	2	Gabriel Constantino	Brazil	13.87	Q
5	2	Yeison Rivas	Colombia	13.94	Q
6	2	João Vítor de Oliveira*	Brazil	14.02	q
7	1	Rasul Dabó	Portugal	14.22	Q
8	2	Diego del Monaco	Chile	14.44	q
	1	Éder Antônio Souza*	Brazil	DQ	R162.7

Final – 16 May
Wind:
+0.7 m/s

Rank	Lane	Name	Nationality	Time	Notes
1st place, gold medalist(s)	7	Javier McFarlane	Peru	13.55	PB
2nd place, silver medalist(s)	4	Eduardo de Deus	Brazil	13.56	
3rd place, bronze medalist(s)	5	Jorge McFarlane	Peru	13.64	
4	8	Yeison Rivas	Colombia	13.64	
5	6	Gabriel Constantino	Brazil	13.76	
6	2	João Vítor de Oliveira*	Brazil	13.90	
7	9	Rasul Dabó	Portugal	14.25	
	3	Diego del Monaco	Chile	DNS	

=== 400 meters hurdles ===
Heats – 14 May

Rank	Heat	Name	Nationality	Time	Notes
1	1	Mark Ujakpor	Spain	50.13	Q, PB
2	2	Juander Santos	Dominican Republic	50.18	Q
3	1	Mikael de Jesus	Brazil	50.26	Q
4	2	Abdullah Mulayhi*	Saudi Arabia	50.35	Q
5	2	Andrés Silva	Uruguay	50.41	Q
6	2	Marcio Teles	Brazil	50.47	q
7	1	Alfredo Sepulveda	Chile	50.68	Q
8	1	Eric Alejandro	Puerto Rico	50.71	q
9	2	José Luis Gaspar	Cuba	50.79	
10	1	Máximo Mercedes	Dominican Republic	51.67	
11	2	Víctor Solarte	Venezuela	51.69	
12	1	Wilson Bello	Venezuela	51.87	
13	2	Gerald Drummond	Costa Rica	52.05	
14	1	Ibrahim Saleh*	Saudi Arabia	52.34	

Final – 15 May

Rank	Lane	Name	Nationality	Time	Notes
1st place, gold medalist(s)	8	Andrés Silva	Uruguay	49.48	
2nd place, silver medalist(s)	3	Mikael de Jesus	Brazil	49.62	
3rd place, bronze medalist(s)	5	Mark Ujakpor	Spain	49.65	PB
4	1	Marcio Teles	Brazil	49.67	
5	4	Juander Santos	Dominican Republic	49.73	
6	7	Alfredo Sepulveda	Chile	49.86	
7	2	Eric Alejandro	Puerto Rico	49.94	
	6	Abdullah Mulayhi*	Saudi Arabia	50.36	

=== 3000 meters steeplechase ===
14 May

Rank	Name	Nationality	Time	Notes
1st place, gold medalist(s)	Altobeli da Silva	Brazil	8:33.72	
2nd place, silver medalist(s)	Joaquin Arbe	Argentina	8:40.21	PB
3rd place, bronze medalist(s)	Ricardo Estremera	Puerto Rico	8:40.87	
4	Andrés Camargo	Colombia	8:43.08	
5	José Peña	Venezuela	8:43.90	
6	Mario Bazán	Peru	8:44.71	
7	Jorge Blanco	Spain	8:50.58	
8	Mauricio Ceballos	Colombia	8:51.47	
9	Jean Machado	Brazil	9:04.18	
	Roberto Tello	Chile	DQ	R169.7a

=== 4 x 100 meters relay ===
16 May

Rank	Lane	Nation	Competitors	Time	Notes
1st place, gold medalist(s)	3	Dominican Republic	Mayovanex de Óleo, Yohandris Andújar, Stanly del Carmen, Yancarlos Martínez	38.52	NR
2nd place, silver medalist(s)	7	Brazil	Ailson Feitosa, Ricardo Souza, Bruno de Barros, Jorge Vides	38.65	SB
3rd place, bronze medalist(s)	5	Cuba	César Yuniel Ruiz, Roberto Skyers, Reynier Mena, Yaniel Carrero	38.93	
4	4	Spain	Arián Olmos Téllez, Bruno Hortelano, Alberto Gavaldá, Ángel David Rodríguez	39.28	
5	8	Paraguay	Nilo Alvarenga, Fredy Maidana, Jesús Cáceres, Christhopher Ortiz	42.36	
	6	Chile	Rodrigo Anguita, Benjamin Palazuelos, Enrique Polanco, Mathias Herbach	DNF	

=== 4 x 400 meters relay ===
16 May

Rank	Nation	Competitors	Time	Notes
1st place, gold medalist(s)	Colombia	Jhon Perlaza, Bernardo Baloyes, Carlos Lemos, Diego Palomeque	3:01.88	NR
2nd place, silver medalist(s)	Dominican Republic	Luis Charles, Yon Soriano, Andito Charles, Máximo Mercedes	3:03.43	
3rd place, bronze medalist(s)	Venezuela	Alberth Bravo, Omar Longart, Arturo Ramírez, Freddy Mezones	3:03.61	
4	Chile	Sergio Germain, Rafael Muñoz, Alfredo Sepulveda, Sergio Aldea	3:07.56	
	Brazil	Hugo de Sousa, Wagner Cardoso, Pedro Luiz de Oliveira, Lucas Carvalho	DQ	R170.19
	Cuba	Williams Collazo, Adrian Chacón, Osmaidel Pellicier, Yoandris Lescay	DQ	R170.19
	Peru		DNS	

=== 20,000 meters walk ===
14 May

Rank	Name	Nationality	Time	Notes
1st place, gold medalist(s)	Caio Bonfim*	Brazil	1:26:40.7	
2nd place, silver medalist(s)	Juan Manuel Cano	Argentina	1:27:27.7	
3rd place, bronze medalist(s)	José Alessandro Bagio	Brazil	1:28:02.1	
	Moacir Zimmermann	Brazil	DQ	

=== High jump ===
16 May

Rank	Name	Nationality	2.10	2.15	2.20	2.23	2.26	2.29	Result	Notes
1st place, gold medalist(s)	Eure Yáñez	Venezuela	o	xx-	o	o	o	xxx	2.26	SB
2nd place, silver medalist(s)	Guilherme Cobbo	Brazil	–	o	o	o	xxx		2.23	
3rd place, bronze medalist(s)	Miguel Ángel Sancho	Spain	o	o	xxo	xo	xxx		2.23	
4	Arturo Chávez	Peru	o	o	xo	xxo	xxx		2.23	PB
5	Talles Frederico Silva	Brazil	–	o	o	xxx			2.20	
6	Paulo Conceição	Portugal	o	o	xxx				2.15	
6	Tiago Pereira	Portugal	o	o	xxx				2.15	
8	Alexander Bowen	Panama	o	xo	xxx				2.15	
8	Carlos Layoy	Argentina	o	xo	xxx				2.15	

=== Pole vault ===
16 May

Rank	Name	Nationality	4.50	4.70	4.90	5.05	5.20	5.30	5.40	5.50	5.60	5.71	Result	Notes
1st place, gold medalist(s)	Germán Chiaraviglio	Argentina	–	–	–	–	–	xo	–	xxo	xo	xxx	5.60	
2nd place, silver medalist(s)	Augusto Dutra de Oliveira	Brazil	–	–	–	–	xxo	xo	xxx				5.30	
3rd place, bronze medalist(s)	Abel Curtinove	Brazil	–	–	–	o	xxo	xxx					5.20	
4	José Rodolfo Pacho	Ecuador	–	–	–	o	xxx						5.05	
5	Rubén Benítez	Argentina	–	–	xxo	xxx							4.90	
6	Natán Rivera	El Salvador	o	xxo	xxx								4.70	=PB

=== Long jump ===
15 May

Rank	Name	Nationality	#1	#2	#3	#4	#5	#6	Result	Notes
1st place, gold medalist(s)	Emiliano Lasa	Uruguay	7.67	7.82	7.90	8.01	–	–	8.01	
2nd place, silver medalist(s)	Jean Marie Okutu	Spain	7.16	7.42	7.68	x	x	7.84	7.84	
3rd place, bronze medalist(s)	Mauro Vinícius da Silva	Brazil	x	x	7.66	x	x	7.71	7.71	
4	Marcos Chuva	Portugal	x	6.89	7.26	x	7.54	7.64	7.64	
5	Danylo Martins	Brazil	7.48	7.64	7.40	7.49	7.48	7.33	7.64	
	Denis Eradiri*	Bulgaria	x	7.14	7.32	x	7.31	x	7.32	
6	Julián Cherit	Argentina	6.79	6.50	7.04	6.81	x	7.16	7.16	
7	Jason Castro	Honduras	6.14	6.10	6.31	x	5.98	6.40	6.40	
8	Andrés Landeta	Ecuador	2.10	x	–				2.10	

=== Triple jump ===
16 May

Rank	Name	Nationality	#1	#2	#3	#4	#5	#6	Result	Notes
1st place, gold medalist(s)	Mateus de Sá	Brazil	15.66	16.22	x	16.30	16.40	16.06	16.40	
2nd place, silver medalist(s)	Jhon Murillo	Colombia	16.35	x	x	15.73	–	x	16.35	
3rd place, bronze medalist(s)	Jean Cassemiro Rosa	Brazil	x	16.01	14.05	16.23	14.89	15.89	16.23	
4	Álvaro Cortez	Chile	x	15.96	x	x	16.00	x	16.00	
5	Maximiliano Díaz	Argentina	15.31	x	x	x	x	x	15.31	
	Jason Castro	Honduras							DNS	

=== Shot put ===
14 May

Rank	Name	Nationality	#1	#2	#3	#4	#5	#6	Result	Notes
1st place, gold medalist(s)	Darlan Romani	Brazil	x	19.67	x	x	x	x	19.67	
2nd place, silver medalist(s)	Marco Fortes	Portugal	18.40	18.75	x	18.55	18.72	19.05	19.05	
3rd place, bronze medalist(s)	Willian Dourado	Brazil	18.96	18.75	18.91	x	18.42	18.48	18.96	
4	Germán Lauro	Argentina	18.88	18.80	18.95	x	x	18.85	18.95	
5	Eder Moreno	Colombia	17.53	18.00	x	18.20	17.97	x	18.20	
6	Aldo Gonzales	Bolivia	18.10	18.13	17.62	x	17.81	17.76	18.13	
7	Alejandro Noguera	Spain	16.84	17.32	x	x	17.10	x	17.32	
8	Santiago Espín	Ecuador	16.88	16.49	16.66	16.29	x	16.78	16.88	
9	Matías López	Chile	16.65	x	16.37				16.65	
10	Josner Ortiz	Venezuela	16.32	x	x				16.32	

=== Discus throw ===
15 May

Rank	Name	Nationality	#1	#2	#3	#4	#5	#6	Result	Notes
1st place, gold medalist(s)	Ronald Julião	Brazil	57.55	x	x	58.01	57.79	59.56	59.56	
2nd place, silver medalist(s)	Pedro José Cuesta	Spain	55.11	57.37	57.23	28.13	–	–	57.37	
3rd place, bronze medalist(s)	Carlos Valle	Brazil	53.47	54.81	54.24	53.71	54.06	53.23	54.81	
4	Winston Campbell	Honduras	47.94	49.29	48.91	47.54	47.31	49.24	49.29	

=== Hammer throw ===
14 May

Rank	Name	Nationality	#1	#2	#3	#4	#5	#6	Result	Notes
1st place, gold medalist(s)	Wagner Domingos	Brazil	x	x	x	70.96	72.18	x	72.18	
2nd place, silver medalist(s)	Roberto Sawyers	Costa Rica	65.45	69.18	70.47	72.15	71.23	x	72.15	
3rd place, bronze medalist(s)	Allan Wolski	Brazil	x	71.12	70.29	68.98	71.69	x	71.69	
4	Humberto Mansilla	Chile	65.41	67.53	67.21	68.15	x	x	68.15	
5	Joaquín Gómez	Argentina	60.87	66.08	64.67	67.34	x	x	67.34	
6	Gabriel Kehr	Chile	65.41	64.99	65.57	64.57	x	66.90	66.90	

=== Javelin throw ===
16 May

Rank	Name	Nationality	#1	#2	#3	#4	#5	#6	Result	Notes
1st place, gold medalist(s)	Arley Ibargüen	Colombia	78.46	75.76	80.28	x	78.53	78.90	80.28	
2nd place, silver medalist(s)	Dayron Márquez	Colombia	76.33	78.49	76.38	78.29	80.08	75.79	80.08	
3rd place, bronze medalist(s)	Júlio César de Oliveira	Brazil	x	79.02	78.18	78.38	77.95	x	79.02	
4	Braian Toledo	Argentina	74.89	75.28	76.08	x	74.27	78.53	78.53	
5	Víctor Fatecha	Paraguay	72.32	73.78	x	–	x	–	73.78	
6	Paulo Silva	Brazil	72.19	69.34	72.91	70.73	70.15	71.58	72.91	
7	Giovanni Díaz	Paraguay	70.38	72.28	71.87	68.79	68.94	71.52	72.28	

=== Decathlon ===
14–15 May

The highest mark recorded in each event is highlighted in yellow

Rank	Athlete	Nationality	100m	LJ	SP	HJ	400m	110m H	DT	PV	JT	1500m	Points	Notes
1st place, gold medalist(s)	Román Gastaldi	Argentina	11.06	7.09	14.54	2.03	49.79	15.10	43.34	4.50	54.91	5:02.79	7634	
2nd place, silver medalist(s)	Alex Soares	Brazil	11.08	7.23	13.26	2.00	49.36	15.15	37.03	4.40	59.09	5:30.17	7330	
3rd place, bronze medalist(s)	Nicolas Nascimento	Brazil	11.70	6.68	13.07	1.97	53.22	15.98	39.73	4.60	52.48	4:49.28	7002	
4	Gerson Izaguirre	Venezuela	11.49	6.79	11.90	1.88	52.45	15.26	35.34	3.80	50.01	5:14.52	6538	
5	Guillermo Ruggeri	Argentina	11.41	6.71	13.08	1.79	50.50	14.90	36.68	4.10	50.82	DNF	6305	

== Women's results ==
=== 100 meters ===
Heats – 14 May
Wind:
Heat 1: -0.7 m/s, Heat 2: -1.1 m/s, Heat 3: +0.2 m/s

Rank	Heat	Name	Nationality	Time	Notes
1	1	Ángela Tenorio	Ecuador	11.37	Q
2	3	Narcisa Landazuri	Ecuador	11.39	Q
3	3	Franciela Krasucki	Brazil	11.40	Q
4	2	Isidora Jiménez	Chile	11.45	Q
5	1	Bruna Farias	Brazil	11.50	Q
6	3	Nedian Vargas	Venezuela	11.51	q
7	1	Celiangeli Morales	Puerto Rico	11.52	q
8	2	Rosângela Santos*	Brazil	11.53	Q
9	3	Evelyn Rivera	Colombia	11.59	
10	1	Eliecith Palacios	Colombia	11.60	
11	2	Andrea Purica	Venezuela	11.64	
11	3	Mariely Sánchez	Dominican Republic	11.64	
13	2	Beatriz Cruz	Puerto Rico	11.70	
14	1	Yasmin Woodruff	Panama	11.84	
15	2	Sharolyn Joseph	Costa Rica	11.95	
16	2	Marleny Mejía	Dominican Republic	12.10	
17	3	Viviana Olivares	Chile	12.11	
18	1	Lauren María Velásquez	El Salvador	12.33	
19	1	Lidiane Lopes	Cape Verde	12.67	

Final – 14 May
Wind:
+0.6 m/s

Rank	Lane	Name	Nationality	Time	Notes
1st place, gold medalist(s)	8	Rosângela Santos*	Brazil	11.24	
2nd place, silver medalist(s)	6	Ángela Tenorio	Ecuador	11.29	
3rd place, bronze medalist(s)	5	Narcisa Landazuri	Ecuador	11.35	
4	3	Isidora Jiménez	Chile	11.37	
5	7	Bruna Farias	Brazil	11.46	PB
6	9	Celiangeli Morales	Puerto Rico	11.50	
7	4	Franciela Krasucki	Brazil	11.51	
8	2	Nedian Vargas	Venezuela	11.54	

=== 200 meters ===
Heats – 15 May
Wind:
Heat 1: -0.3 m/s, Heat 2: -0.3 m/s

Rank	Heat	Name	Nationality	Time	Notes
1	2	Ángela Tenorio	Ecuador	23.11	Q
2	1	Isidora Jiménez	Chile	23.19	Q
3	1	Nercelis Soto	Venezuela	23.26	Q
4	2	Kauiza Venâncio	Brazil	23.35	Q
5	1	Franciela Krasucki	Brazil	23.41	Q
6	1	Narcisa Landazuri	Ecuador	23.55	q
6	2	Nana Jacob	Spain	23.55	Q
8	1	Rosângela Santos*	Brazil	23.78	q
9	2	Celiangeli Morales	Puerto Rico	23.83	
10	1	Mariely Sánchez	Dominican Republic	23.84	
11	2	Vitória Cristina Rosa*	Brazil	23.95	
12	1	Yasmin Woodruff	Panama	24.20	
13	2	María Alejandra Idrobo	Colombia	24.63	
14	2	Rosa Fabián	Dominican Republic	24.93	
15	1	Lauren María Velásquez	El Salvador	25.47	
	2	Sharolyn Joseph	Costa Rica	DNS	

Final – 16 May
Wind:
+0.2 m/s

Rank	Lane	Name	Nationality	Time	Notes
1st place, gold medalist(s)	3	Nercelis Soto	Venezuela	22.95	
2nd place, silver medalist(s)	4	Ángela Tenorio	Ecuador	23.13	
3rd place, bronze medalist(s)	6	Kauiza Venâncio	Brazil	23.18	
4	5	Isidora Jiménez	Chile	23.34	
5	7	Nana Jacob	Spain	23.47	
6	1	Narcisa Landazuri	Ecuador	23.61	
	8	Franciela Krasucki	Brazil	DNF	
	2	Rosângela Santos*	Brazil	DNS	

=== 400 meters ===
Heats – 14 May

Rank	Heat	Name	Nationality	Time	Notes
1	1	Carol Rodríguez	Puerto Rico	52.79	Q
2	1	Letícia Souza	Brazil	52.88	Q
3	2	Jailma Lima	Brazil	53.46	Q
4	2	Jennifer Padilla	Colombia	53.59	Q
5	1	Rosa Fabián	Dominican Republic	53.82	Q
6	2	María Fernanda Mackenna	Chile	54.34	Q
7	1	Paula Goni	Chile	54.38	q
8	1	Bárbara Camblor	Spain	54.51	q
9	2	Geraxane Ussia	Spain	54.74	
10	2	Maitte Torres	Peru	55.02	
11	2	Maryuri Valdez	Venezuela	55.88	
12	1	María Simancas	Venezuela	56.73	
13	1	Fátima Amarilla	Paraguay	57.84	

Final – 15 May

Rank	Lane	Name	Nationality	Time	Notes
1st place, gold medalist(s)	6	Jailma Lima	Brazil	51.99	
2nd place, silver medalist(s)	6	Carol Rodríguez	Puerto Rico	52.46	
3rd place, bronze medalist(s)	5	Letícia Souza	Brazil	52.79	
4	4	Jennifer Padilla	Colombia	52.79	
5	1	Paula Goni	Chile	54.59	
6	7	Rosa Fabián	Dominican Republic	54.59	
7	8	María Fernanda Mackenna	Chile	54.60	
8	2	Bárbara Camblor	Spain	54.80	

=== 800 meters ===
15 May

Rank	Name	Nationality	Time	Notes
1st place, gold medalist(s)	Rosibel García	Colombia	2:07.06	
2nd place, silver medalist(s)	Lorena Sosa	Uruguay	2:08.00	
3rd place, bronze medalist(s)	Liliane Mariano	Brazil	2:08.03	
4	Johanna Arrieta	Colombia	2:08.40	
5	Jaqueline Weber	Brazil	2:10.32	
6	Felismina Cavela	Angola	2:10.63	
7	Carmen Mansilla	Chile	2:11.14	

=== 1500 meters ===
16 May

Rank	Name	Nationality	Time	Notes
1st place, gold medalist(s)	Muriel Coneo	Colombia	4:09.35	
2nd place, silver medalist(s)	Carolina Lozano	Argentina	4:11.71	NR
3rd place, bronze medalist(s)	María Pía Fernández	Uruguay	4:12.61	NR
4	July da Silva	Brazil	4:14.30	
5	Montse Mas	Spain	4:16.75	
6	María Osorio	Venezuela	4:18.31	NR
7	Soledad Torre	Peru	4:18.66	
8	Zulema Arenas	Peru	4:19.14	
9	Alondra Negrón	Puerto Rico	4:24.68	
10	Érika Machado	Brazil	4:34.43	
11	Felismina Cavela	Angola	4:39.88	
	Belén Casetta	Argentina	DNS	
	Lorena Sosa	Uruguay	DNS	

=== 3000 meters ===
14 May

Rank	Name	Nationality	Time	Notes
1st place, gold medalist(s)	Juliana Paula dos Santos	Brazil	9:03.11	
2nd place, silver medalist(s)	Muriel Coneo	Colombia	9:04.79	NR
3rd place, bronze medalist(s)	Florencia Borelli	Argentina	9:10.79	
4	Maria Aparecida Ferraz	Brazil	9:18.13	
5	Soledad Torre	Peru	9:18.45	
6	Saida Meneses	Peru	9:21.69	
7	Rosa del Toro	El Salvador	9:51.81	
	Salome Mendoza	Bolivia	DNS	

=== 5000 meters ===
16 May

Rank	Name	Nationality	Time	Notes
1st place, gold medalist(s)	Sara Moreira	Portugal	15:40.33	
2nd place, silver medalist(s)	Florencia Borelli	Argentina	16:28.66	
3rd place, bronze medalist(s)	Jenifer Silva	Brazil	16:29.59	
4	Saida Meneses	Peru	16:47.25	
5	Maria Aparecida Ferraz	Brazil	16:57.08	
6	Rosa del Toro	El Salvador	17:27.13	

=== 100 meters hurdles ===
16 May
Wind: -0.2 m/s

Rank	Lane	Name	Nationality	Time	Notes
1st place, gold medalist(s)	2	Fabiana Moraes	Brazil	12.91	PB
2nd place, silver medalist(s)	5	Maíla Machado	Brazil	12.99	
3rd place, bronze medalist(s)	8	Brigitte Merlano	Colombia	13.06	
4	4	Génesis Romero	Venezuela	13.24	
5	9	Diana Bazalar	Peru	13.60	
6	7	Maribel Caicedo	Ecuador	13.62	
7	6	Lina Flórez	Colombia	13.88	
8	3	Iris Santamaría	El Salvador	15.31	

=== 400 meters hurdles ===
15 May

Rank	Lane	Name	Nationality	Time	Notes
1st place, gold medalist(s)	4	Déborah Rodríguez	Uruguay	57.22	
2nd place, silver medalist(s)	7	Gianna Woodruff	Panama	57.34	
3rd place, bronze medalist(s)	5	Liliane Fernandes	Brazil	58.42	
4	3	Alessandra Silva	Brazil	58.51	
5	6	Fátima Amarilla	Paraguay	1:03.85	

=== 3000 meters steeplechase ===
14 May

Rank	Name	Nationality	Time	Notes
1st place, gold medalist(s)	Belén Casetta	Argentina	9:42.93	NR
2nd place, silver medalist(s)	Tatiane da Silva	Brazil	9:46.86	
3rd place, bronze medalist(s)	Zulema Arenas	Peru	9:56.04	
4	Carolina Lozano	Argentina	10:00.95	
5	María Osorio	Venezuela	10:43.18	
	Érika Machado	Brazil	DNF	

=== 4 x 100 meters relay ===
16 May

Rank	Lane	Nation	Competitors	Time	Notes
1st place, gold medalist(s)	5	Puerto Rico	Beatriz Cruz, Celiangeli Morales, Genoiska Cancel, Carol Rodríguez	43.55	
2nd place, silver medalist(s)	3	Brazil	Bruna Farias, Vanusa dos Santos, Kauiza Venâncio, Gabriela Mourão	43.68	
3rd place, bronze medalist(s)	4	Venezuela	Andrea Purica, Nedian Vargas, Nelsibeth Villalobos, Nercelis Soto	43.94	
4	7	Colombia	María Alejandra Idrobo, Eliecith Palacios, Darlenys Obregón, Evelyn Rivera	44.14	
5	6	Dominican Republic	Marleny Mejía, Margarita Manzueta, Rosa Fabián, Marileidy Paulino	44.56	
6	2	Chile	Daniela Pávez, Isidora Jiménez, Viviana Olivares, Javiera Cañas	45.09	

=== 4 x 400 meters relay ===
16 May

Rank	Nation	Competitors	Time	Notes
1st place, gold medalist(s)	Brazil	Kamilla Miranda, Letícia Souza, Joelma Sousa, Jailma Lima	3:32.30	
2nd place, silver medalist(s)	Spain	Geraxane Ussia, Indira Terrero, Bárbara Camblor, Laura Bueno	3:36.16	
3rd place, bronze medalist(s)	Chile	Paula Goni, Viviana Olivares, Carmen Mansilla, María Fernanda Mackenna	3:36.16	
	Venezuela	Emileth Pirela, María Simancas, Nelsibeth Villalobos, Maryuri Valdez	DQ	R170.20

=== 10,000 meters walk ===
15 May

Rank	Name	Nationality	Time	Notes
1st place, gold medalist(s)	Érica de Sena	Brazil	45:01.32	
2nd place, silver medalist(s)	María Pérez	Spain	45:31.83	
3rd place, bronze medalist(s)	Daniela Cardoso	Portugal	46:03.44	
4	Liliane Priscila Barbosa	Brazil	49:42.42	

=== High jump ===
14 May

Rank	Name	Nationality	1.65	1.70	1.75	1.78	1.81	1.84	1.87	1.90	1.93	1.96	Result	Notes
	Chaunté Lowe*	United States	–	–	–	–	o	o	o	xo	o	xxo	1.96	SB
1st place, gold medalist(s)	Valdileia Martins	Brazil	–	–	–	o	o	o	xxx				1.84	
2nd place, silver medalist(s)	Raquel Álvarez	Spain	–	–	o	–	o	xo	xxx				1.84	SB
3rd place, bronze medalist(s)	Julia Cristina Silva	Brazil	o	o	o	xxx							1.75	
4	Lorena Aires	Uruguay	–	o	xo	xxx							1.75	

=== Pole vault ===
14 May

Rank	Name	Nationality	3.70	3.90	4.10	4.30	4.40	4.50	4.60	4.70	Result	Notes
1st place, gold medalist(s)	Fabiana Murer	Brazil	–	–	–	–	xo	o	xo	xxx	4.60	
2nd place, silver medalist(s)	Diamara Planell	Puerto Rico	–	–	o	o	xx–	x			4.30	
3rd place, bronze medalist(s)	Valeria Chiaraviglio	Argentina	–	o	o	xxx					4.10	
3rd place, bronze medalist(s)	Joana Costa	Brazil	o	o	o	xxx					4.10	
5	Daniela Inchausti	Argentina	xo	o	xxx						3.90	

=== Long jump ===
14 May

Rank	Name	Nationality	#1	#2	#3	#4	#5	#6	Result	Notes
1st place, gold medalist(s)	Eliane Martins	Brazil	6.34	x	x	6.52	6.28	x	6.52	
2nd place, silver medalist(s)	Keila Costa*	Brazil	6.13	6.33	x	6.43	x	6.31	6.43	
3rd place, bronze medalist(s)	Jessica dos Reis	Brazil	6.02	6.31	5.77	5.94	x	6.28	6.31	
4	Paola Mautino	Peru	5.81	6.04	6.08	6.01	6.05	6.18	6.18	
5	Macarena Reyes	Chile	5.96	x	5.87	x	5.84	5.90	5.96	
6	Juliana Angulo	Ecuador	5.86	5.93	5.95	x	x	5.90	5.95	
7	Alexa Morey	Peru	x	x	5.62	x	5.94	5.92	5.94	
8	Munich Tovar	Venezuela	x	x	x	5.82	x	x	5.82	

=== Triple jump ===
15 May

Rank	Name	Nationality	#1	#2	#3	#4	#5	#6	Result	Notes
1st place, gold medalist(s)	Keila Costa*	Brazil	13.77	13.86	14.01	13.98	13.81	x	14.01	
2nd place, silver medalist(s)	Núbia Soares	Brazil	x	x	13.98	14.00	13.89	x	14.00	
3rd place, bronze medalist(s)	Yosiris Urrutia	Colombia	x	13.89	13.58	x	13.41	13.34	13.89	
4	Ana José Tima	Dominican Republic	13.59	13.84	x	13.77	13.63	x	13.84	
5	Tânia da Silva	Brazil	13.24	13.31	x	x	13.14	12.94	13.31	
6	Norka Moretic	Chile	13.00	12.87	x	x	13.27	13.22	13.27	
7	Mirian Reyes	Peru	12.55	12.88	12.89	12.49	13.02	13.06	13.06	
	Sandra Tavares	Cape Verde							DNS	

=== Shot put ===
15 May

Rank	Name	Nationality	#1	#2	#3	#4	#5	#6	Result	Notes
1st place, gold medalist(s)	Ahymara Espinoza	Venezuela	x	17.32	17.83	17.54	17.33	18.19	18.19	
2nd place, silver medalist(s)	Geisa Arcanjo	Brazil	17.44	17.91	17.68	17.52	x	17.92	17.92	
3rd place, bronze medalist(s)	Natalia Duco	Chile	17.02	17.35	17.44	17.19	17.45	17.35	17.45	
4	Sandra Lemos	Colombia	17.00	17.29	16.85	16.45	x	17.28	17.29	
5	Keely Medeiros	Brazil	15.91	16.82	17.25	x	16.97	x	17.25	
6	Ivana Gallardo	Chile	14.90	x	x	x	15.69	16.51	16.51	

=== Discus throw ===
15 May

Rank	Name	Nationality	#1	#2	#3	#4	#5	#6	Result	Notes
	Stephanie Trafton*	United States	58.36	59.41	61.22	59.06	x	58.64	61.22	
1st place, gold medalist(s)	Karen Gallardo	Chile	51.91	56.76	56.77	57.91	54.73	58.84	58.84	
2nd place, silver medalist(s)	Fernanda Martins	Brazil	x	58.43	x	x	56.89	57.51	58.43	
3rd place, bronze medalist(s)	Rocío Comba	Argentina	54.41	53.53	56.75	56.33	54.25	x	56.75	
4	Andressa de Morais	Brazil	x	x	55.28	53.71	x	x	55.28	
5	Ivana Gallardo	Chile	47.14	x	48.40	51.01	49.98	49.98	51.01	
6	Alma Ondina Gutiérrez	Honduras	38.39	38.51	x	38.97	38.63	x	38.97	

=== Hammer throw ===
14 May

Rank	Name	Nationality	#1	#2	#3	#4	#5	#6	Result	Notes
1st place, gold medalist(s)	Jennifer Dahlgren	Argentina	63.46	64.79	64.42	x	65.87	64.66	65.87	
2nd place, silver medalist(s)	Anna Paula Pereira	Brazil	57.12	x	x	59.42	61.42	59.92	61.42	
3rd place, bronze medalist(s)	Mariana Marcelino	Brazil	57.32	58.93	x	x	59.27	60.91	60.91	
4	Mayra Gaviria	Colombia	x	55.68	57.35	x	x	56.18	57.35	

=== Javelin throw ===
16 May

Rank	Name	Nationality	#1	#2	#3	#4	#5	#6	Result	Notes
1st place, gold medalist(s)	Flor Ruiz	Colombia	x	60.29	60.57	62.15	59.57	56.94	62.15	
2nd place, silver medalist(s)	Laila Ferrer e Silva	Brazil	57.46	59.35	x	56.26	60.44	55.96	60.44	
3rd place, bronze medalist(s)	Coraly Ortiz	Puerto Rico	x	x	57.97	x	57.72	58.31	58.31	
4	Lilian Seibert	Brazil	51.76	47.97	50.78	55.87	49.07	52.27	55.87	
5	María Paz Ríos	Chile	50.68	51.23	x	53.07	x	49.37	53.07	
6	Laura Paredes	Paraguay	46.78	52.19	47.42	x	51.09	x	52.19	

=== Heptathlon ===
15–16 May

The highest mark recorded in each event is highlighted in yellow

Rank	Athlete	Nationality	100m H	HJ	SP	200m	LJ	JT	800m	Points	Notes
1st place, gold medalist(s)	Alysbeth Félix	Puerto Rico	13.54	1.81	11.35	24.51	6.06	35.40	2:16.04	5910	NR
2nd place, silver medalist(s)	Evelis Aguilar	Colombia	14.17	1.63	13.37	23.94	5.89	39.96	2:11.61	5887	
3rd place, bronze medalist(s)	Anna Camila Pirelli	Paraguay	13.55	1.57	13.75	24.91	5.43	43.80	2:13.65	5748	
4	Lecabela Quaresma	Portugal	13.94	1.72	12.45	25.67	5.86	40.11	2:16.85	5726	
5	Giovana Cavaleti	Brazil	14.12	1.72	12.97	24.41	5.65	30.36	2:22.84	5519	
6	Luisairys Toledo	Venezuela	15.14	1.60	11.13	25.21	5.68	38.36	2:18.51	5264	
7	Tamara de Sousa	Brazil	14.40	1.60	15.01	25.19	NM	42.33	DNF	4102	
	Fiorella Chiappe	Argentina	14.42	1.66	10.96	24.89	5.95	30.37	DNS	4533	
	Estefanía Fortes	Spain	14.32	1.54	12.38	25.67	5.32	DNS	–	DNF	
	Chaunté Lowe*	United States	13.96	1.93	9.44	24.47	DNS	–	–	DNF	
