= 2013 South American Championships in Athletics =

48th South American Championships
- Dates: July 5-7
- Host city: Cartagena, Colombia
- Venue: Parque de Atletismo Campo Elías Gutiérrez
- Level: Senior
- Events: 44 (22 men, 22 women)
- Participation: 322 athletes from 13 nations
- Records set: 7

The 48th South American Championships in Athletics were held at the Parque de Atletismo Campo Elías Gutiérrez in Cartagena, Colombia, between July 5-7, 2013.

A total of 44 events were contested, 22 by men and 22 by women.

Detailed reports on the championships were given by Eduardo Biscayart.

== Records ==
One new area record in pole vault, as well as seven new South American Championships records and a couple of other (mainly national) records were set.

Name	Event	Country	Record	Type
Men
Álex Quiñónez	200 metres	Ecuador	20.44 s (wind: +1.8 m/s)	=CR
Jorge McFarlane	110 metres hurdles	Peru	13.61 s (wind: +1.0 m/s)	NR
José Peña	3000 metres steeplechase	Venezuela	8:32.01 min	CR
Thiago Braz da Silva	Pole vault	Brazil	5.83 m	AR, CR, NR
Mauro Vinícius da Silva	Long jump	Brazil	8.24 m (wind: +1.8 m/s)	CR
Germán Lauro	Shot put	Argentina	20.87 m	CR
Mauricio Ortega	Discus throw	Colombia	57.76 m	NR
Women
María Caballero	800 metres	Paraguay	2:09.67 min	NR
Rosibel García	1500 metres	Colombia	4:15.84 min	CR
Muriel Coneo	1500 metres	Colombia	4:15.84 min	CR
Zulema Arenas	3000 metres steeplechase	Peru	10:12.72 min	NR, NU20R
Jennifer Clayton	Long jump	Panama	6.18 m (wind: +1.9 m/s)	NR
Ahymará Espinoza	Shot put	Venezuela	17.47 m	NR
Flor Ruiz	Javelin throw	Colombia	60.23 m	CR

Key:	WR — World record • AR — Area record • CR — Championship record • NR — National record • NJR — National junior record

== Medal summary ==
The results were published by the Federación Colombiana de Atletismo.

=== Men ===
Event	Gold		Silver		Bronze	
100 metres (wind: +1.3 m/s)	Álex Quiñónez (ECU)	10.22	Bruno de Barros (BRA)	10.33	Isidro Montoya (COL)	10.38
200 metres (wind: +1.8 m/s)	Álex Quiñónez (ECU)	20.44 =CR	Bernardo Baloyes (COL)	20.71	Jorge Vides (BRA)	20.71
400 metres	José Meléndez (VEN)	46.31	Wagner Cardoso (BRA)	46.38	Stephan James (GUY)	46.47
800 metres	Rafith Rodríguez (COL)	1:46.34	Diego Chargal Gomes (BRA)	1:48.17	Lutmar Paes (BRA)	1:48.50
1500 metres	Jean Carlos Machado (BRA)	3:45.94	Federico Bruno (ARG)	3:45.94	Iván López (CHI)	3:46.00
5000 metres	Bayron Piedra (ECU)	14:15.35	Víctor Aravena (CHI)	14:17.97	Javier Guarín (COL)	14:19.82
10,000 metres	Solonei da Silva (BRA)	29:51.79	José Luis Rojas (PER)	30:13.10	William Naranjo (COL)	30:19.29
3000 metres steeplechase	José Peña (VEN)	8:32.01 CR	Mauricio Valdivia (CHI)	8:44.36	Gladson Barbosa (BRA)	8:45.10
110 metres hurdles (wind: +1.0 m/s)	Jorge McFarlane (PER)	13.61 NR	Mateus Facho Inocêncio (BRA)	13.67	Jonatha Mendes (BRA)	13.84
400 metres hurdles	Mahau Suguimati (BRA)	49.86	Andrés Silva (URU)	50.52	Yeison Rivas (COL)	51.01
4 x 100 metres relay	Brazil; José Carlos Moreira; Jorge Vides; Jefferson Lucindo; Rebert Firmiano	39.47	Colombia; Isidro Montoya; Vladimir Valencia; Daniel Grueso; Yeison Rivas	39.76	Venezuela; Jermaine Chirinos; Álvaro Cassiani; Albert Bravo; Alberto Aguilar	39.81
4 x 400 metres relay	Venezuela; Arturo Ramírez; Alberto Aguilar; José Meléndez; Freddy Mezones	3:03.64	Colombia; Jhon Perlaza; Carlos Lemos; Rafith Rodríguez; Yeison Rivas	3:06.25	Brazil; Wagner Cardoso; Jonathan da Silva; Hederson Estefani; Willian Carvalho	3:08.60
20,000 metres walk	Caio Bonfim (BRA)	1:24:28.40	Éider Arévalo (COL)	1:24:36.23	Andrés Chocho (ECU)	1:26:20.18
High jump	Talles Frederico Silva (BRA)	2.22	Wanner Miller (COL); Guilherme Cobbo (BRA)	2.19		
Pole vault	Thiago Braz da Silva (BRA)	5.83 AR, CR, NR	Germán Chiaraviglio (ARG)	5.40	João Gabriel Sousa (BRA)	5.40
Long jump	Mauro Vinícius da Silva (BRA)	8.24 (wind: +1.8 m/s) CR	Jorge McFarlane (PER)	8.01 w (wind: +2.6 m/s)	Irving Saladino (PAN)	7.94 (wind: +1.5 m/s)
Triple jump	Jefferson Sabino (BRA)	16.73 (wind: m/s)	Jhon Murillo (COL)	16.36 (wind: m/s)	Jonathan Henrique Silva (BRA)	16.35 (wind: m/s)
Shot put	Germán Lauro (ARG)	20.87 CR	Darlan Romani (BRA)	19.64	Michael Putman (PER)	18.73
Discus throw	Germán Lauro (ARG)	60.45	Andrés Rossini (ARG)	57.77	Mauricio Ortega (COL)	57.76 NU20R
Hammer throw	Wagner Domingos (BRA)	71.36	Juan Ignacio Cerra (ARG)	69.33	Allan Wolski (BRA)	66.25
Javelin throw	Víctor Fatecha (PAR)	76.14	Arley Ibargüen (COL)	76.13	Braian Toledo (ARG)	75.33
Decathlon	Roman Gastaldi (ARG)	7273	Renato Atila (BRA)	7175	Óscar Campos (VEN)	7026

=== Women ===
Event	Gold		Silver		Bronze	
100 metres (wind: +0.1 m/s)	Ana Cláudia Lemos (BRA)	11.21	Franciela Krasucki (BRA)	11.27	Eliecith Palacios (COL)	11.56
200 metres (wind: +3.4 m/s)	Ana Cláudia Lemos (BRA)	22.70 w	Nercely Soto (VEN)	23.05 w	Érika Chávez (ECU)	23.10 w
400 metres	Joelma Sousa (BRA)	52.25	Nercely Soto (VEN)	53.96	Jennifer Padilla (COL)	54.28
800 metres	Rosibel García (COL)	2:02.45	Flávia de Lima (BRA)	2:02.94	Andrea Ferris (PAN)	2:03.57
1500 metres	Rosibel García (COL)	4:15.84 CR	Muriel Coneo (COL)	4:15.84 CR	Andrea Ferris (PAN)	4:16.34
5000 metres	Carolina Tabares (COL)	16:09.82	Gladys Tejeda (PER)	16:19.39	Wilma Arizapana (PER)	16:22.82
10,000 metres	Cruz da Silva (BRA)	34:44.14	Carolina Tabares (COL)	34:47.59	Diana Landi (ECU)	35:12.53
3000 metres steeplechase	Erika Lima (BRA)	9:54.97	Rolanda Bell (PAN)	10:04.01	Muriel Coneo (COL)	10:09.91
100 metres hurdles (wind: +2.0 m/s)	Lina Flórez (COL)	13.09	Brigitte Merlano (COL)	13.20	Fabiana Morães (BRA)	13.21
400 metres hurdles	Liliane Fernandes (BRA)	58.03	Déborah Rodríguez (URU)	58.06	Fernanda Tavares (BRA)	58.83
4 x 100 metres relay	Brazil; Ana Cláudia Lemos; Franciela Krasucki; Jailma de Lima; Evelyn dos Santos	43.37	Colombia; Eliecith Palacios; Alejandra Idrobo; Lina Flórez; Yomara Hinestroza	44.01	Venezuela; Lexabeth Hidalgo; Nercely Soto; Génesis Romero; Nelsibeth Villalobos	45.44
4 x 400 metres relay	Brazil; Joelma Sousa; Evelyn dos Santos; Liliane Fernandes; Jailma de Lima	3:35.37	Colombia; Jennifer Padilla; Lina Flórez; Rosibel García; Yaneth Largacha	3:36.29	Ecuador; Érika Chávez; Celene Cevallos; Yadira Méndez; Nicol Minota; Andrea Calderón	3:43.01
20,000 metres walk	Sandra Arenas (COL)	1:37.46.17	Arabelly Orjuela (COL)	1:38.59.78	Wendy Cornejo (BOL)	1:39.43.89
High jump	Mônica de Freitas (BRA)	1.79	Anyi García (COL)	1.76	Kashany Ríos (PAN); Aline Fernanda Santos (BRA)	1.73
Pole vault	Karla da Silva (BRA)	4.20	Valeria Chiaraviglio (ARG)	4.15	Milena Agudelo (COL)	3.90
Long jump	Macarena Reyes (CHI)	6.54 (wind: m/s)	Keila Costa (BRA)	6.49 (wind: +1.4 m/s)	Jéssica Carolina dos Reis (BRA)	6.49 w (wind: +2.5 m/s)
Triple jump	Keila Costa (BRA)	14.21 w (wind: +3.4 m/s)	Yosiris Urrutia (COL)	13.92 (wind: +1.6 m/s)	Gissely Landazury (COL)	13.71 (wind: +1.2 m/s)
Shot put	Geisa Arcanjo (BRA)	18.27	Sandra Lemos (COL)	17.72	Ahymará Espinoza (VEN)	17.47 NR
Discus throw	Fernanda Raquel Borges Martins (BRA)	60.79	Rocío Comba (ARG)	58.75	Karen Gallardo (CHI)	57.04
Hammer throw	Rosa Rodríguez (VEN)	68.38	Johana Moreno (COL)	67.22	Jennifer Dahlgren (ARG)	65.82
Javelin throw	Flor Ruiz (COL)	60.23 CR	Laila Ferrer e Silva (BRA)	58.80	Jucilene de Lima (BRA)	57.73
Heptathlon	Tamara de Sousa (BRA)	5685	Ana Camila Pirelli (PAR)	5610	Agustina Zerboni (ARG)	5317

== Medal table (unofficial) ==
* Host nation (Colombia)

Rank	Nation	Gold	Silver	Bronze	Total
1	Brazil (BRA)	24	11	13	48
2	Colombia (COL)*	7	17	10	34
3	Venezuela (VEN)	4	2	4	10
4	Argentina (ARG)	3	6	3	12
5	Ecuador (ECU)	3	0	4	7
6	Peru (PER)	1	3	2	6
7	Chile (CHI)	1	2	2	5
8	Paraguay (PAR)	1	1	0	2
9	Uruguay (URU)	0	2	0	2
10	Panama (PAN)	0	1	4	5
11	Bolivia (BOL)	0	0	1	1
11	Guyana (GUY)	0	0	1	1
Totals (12 entries)		44	45	44	133

== Team trophies ==
Brazil won the team trophies in all three categories.

=== Total ===
The host country is highlighted in lavender blue

Rank	Nation	Points
1st place, gold medalist(s)	Brazil	449
2nd place, silver medalist(s)	Colombia	292
3rd place, bronze medalist(s)	Venezuela	136
4	Argentina	119
5	Ecuador	78
6	Chile	59
7	(Peru) Perú	53
8	Paraguay	30
9	(Panama) Panamá	28
10	Uruguay	12
11	Bolivia	7
12	Guyana	6
13	Suriname	0

=== Men ===
The host country is highlighted in lavender blue

Rank	Nation	Points
1st place, gold medalist(s)	Brazil	209
2nd place, silver medalist(s)	Colombia	109

=== Women ===
The host country is highlighted in lavender blue

Rank	Nation	Points
1st place, gold medalist(s)	Brazil	240
2nd place, silver medalist(s)	Colombia	183

== Participation ==
All 13 member federations of CONSUDATLE were participating summing up to about 322 athletes.

- Argentina (27)
- Bolivia (5)
- Brazil (78)
- Chile (14)
- Colombia (69)
- Ecuador (31)
- Guyana (3)
- Panama (14)
- Paraguay (8)
- (Peru) Perú (29)
- Suriname (1)
- Uruguay (6)
- Venezuela (37)
