= María Alejandra Idrobo =

Colombian sprinter (born 1988)

Personal information
- Full name: María Alejandra Idrobo Paz
- Born: 8 April 1988 (age 38) El Tambo, Cauca, Colombia
- Height: 1.70 m (5 ft 7 in)
- Weight: 68 kg (150 lb)

Sport
- Country: Colombia
- Sport: Athletics
- Event: Sprint
- Updated on 29 December 2014

María Alejandra Idrobo Paz (born 8 April 1988) is a Colombian athlete who specialises in the sprinting events. She has won multiple medals on the regional level.

== Personal bests ==
- 100 metres – 11.43 (+0.4 m/s) (Bogotá, 13 August 2011)
- 200 metres – 23.20 (+0.9 m/s) (Barquisimeto, 9 June 2012)
- 400 metres – 52.80 A (Bogotá, 24 May 2009)

== Competition record ==
Year	Competition	Venue	Position	Event	Notes
Representing Colombia
2003	World Youth Championships	Sherbrooke, Canada	23rd (h)	400 m	59.07
2003	World Youth Championships	Sherbrooke, Canada	–	Medley relay	DNF
2004	South American U-23 Championships	Barquisimeto, Venezuela	2nd (h)	400 m	55.00
2004	South American Youth Championships	Guayaquil, Ecuador	1st	400 m	55.74
2004	South American Youth Championships	Guayaquil, Ecuador	3rd	4x100 m	47.29
2004	South American Youth Championships	Guayaquil, Ecuador	3rd	Medley relay	2:13.2
2005	World Youth Championships	Marrakesh, Morocco	6th	400 m	54.58
2005	South American Championships	Cali, Colombia	4th	400 m	54.53
2005	South American Championships	Cali, Colombia	2nd	4x400 m	3:36.95
2005	Pan American Junior Championships	Windsor, Canada	5th	400 m	53.77
2005	Bolivarian Games	Armenia, Colombia	3rd	400 m	54.06 A
2005	Bolivarian Games	Armenia, Colombia	1st	4x400 m relay	3:35.25 A
2005	South American Junior Championships	Rosario, Argentina	1st	400 m	54.20
2005	South American Junior Championships	Rosario, Argentina	2nd	4x100 m	46.28
2005	South American Junior Championships	Rosario, Argentina	1st	4x400 m	3:44.80
2006	World Junior Championships	Beijing, China	22nd (sf)	400 m	55.27
2006	Central American and Caribbean Games	Cartagena, Colombia	13th (h)	400 m	55.93
2006	Central American and Caribbean Games	Cartagena, Colombia	5th	4x400 m	3:41.42
2006	South American Championships	Tunja, Colombia	3rd	400 m	53.94
2006	South American Championships	Tunja, Colombia	2nd	4x100 m	44.78
2006	South American Championships	Tunja, Colombia	2nd	4x400 m	3:37.12
2006	South American U23 Championships / South American Games	Buenos Aires, Argentina	4th	200 m	23.98 (+1.7 m/s)
2006	South American U23 Championships / South American Games	Buenos Aires, Argentina	1st	400 m	53.90
2006	South American U23 Championships / South American Games	Buenos Aires, Argentina	1st	4x100 m	45.14
2006	South American U23 Championships / South American Games	Buenos Aires, Argentina	2nd	4x400 m	3:41.92
2007	South American Championships	São Paulo, Brazil	4th	400 m	53.54
2007	South American Championships	São Paulo, Brazil	2nd	4x400 m relay	3:43.52
2007	South American Junior Championships	São Paulo, Brazil	2nd	200 m	23.97 (0.0 m/s)
2007	South American Junior Championships	São Paulo, Brazil	1st	400 m	54.24
2007	South American Junior Championships	São Paulo, Brazil	2nd	4x100 m	45.71
2007	South American Junior Championships	São Paulo, Brazil	3rd	4x400 m	3:50.61
2007	Pan American Junior Championships	São Paulo, Brazil	5th	400 m	53.36
2007	Pan American Junior Championships	São Paulo, Brazil	4th	4x100 m	45.78
2007	Pan American Games	Rio de Janeiro, Brazil	17th (h)	400 m	54.29
2008	Ibero-American Championships	Iquique, Chile	1st	4x100 m	44.89
2008	Ibero-American Championships	Iquique, Chile	2nd	4x400 m	3:39.46
2008	Central American and Caribbean Championships	Cali, Colombia	16th (h)	400 m	54.57
2008	Central American and Caribbean Championships	Cali, Colombia	4th	4x400 m	3:39.45
2009	South American Championships	Lima, Peru	4th	400 m	53.54
2009	South American Championships	Lima, Peru	1st	4x100 m	44.18
2009	South American Championships	Lima, Peru	2nd	4x400 m	3:35.83
2009	Central American and Caribbean Championships	Havana, Cuba	5th	400 m	53.95
2010	South American U23 Championships / South American Games	Medellín, Colombia	5th	200 m	24.20 (-0.7 m/s)
2010	South American U23 Championships / South American Games	Medellín, Colombia	2nd	4x100 m	44.94
2010	South American U23 Championships / South American Games	Medellín, Colombia	1st	4x400 m	3:40.09
2010	Ibero-American Championships	San Fernando, Spain	6th	100 m	11.74
2010	Ibero-American Championships	San Fernando, Spain	2nd	4x100 m	44.29
2010	Ibero-American Championships	San Fernando, Spain	5th	4x400 m	3:38.94
2010	Central American and Caribbean Games	Mayagüez, Puerto Rico	7th	100 m	11.67
2010	Central American and Caribbean Games	Mayagüez, Puerto Rico	1st	4x100 m	43.63
2010	Central American and Caribbean Games	Mayagüez, Puerto Rico	2nd	4x400 m	3:33.03
2011	South American Championships	Buenos Aires, Argentina	4th	100 m	11.84
2011	South American Championships	Buenos Aires, Argentina	1st	4x100 m	44.11
2011	South American Championships	Buenos Aires, Argentina	2nd	4x400 m	3:37.66
2011	Central American and Caribbean Championships	Mayagüez, Puerto Rico	6th	200 m	23.79
2011	Central American and Caribbean Championships	Mayagüez, Puerto Rico	4th	4x100 m	43.92
2011	World Championships	Daegu, South Korea	9th (h)	4x100 m	43.53
2012	Ibero-American Championships	Barquisimeto, Venezuela	3rd	100 m	11.53
2012	Ibero-American Championships	Barquisimeto, Venezuela	2nd	200 m	23.20
2012	Ibero-American Championships	Barquisimeto, Venezuela	3rd	4x100 m	44.42
2013	South American Championships	Cartagena, Colombia	5th	100 m	11.64
2013	South American Championships	Cartagena, Colombia	2nd	4x100 m	44.01
2013	World Championships	Moscow, Russia	15th (h)	4x100 m	43.65
2013	Bolivarian Games	Trujillo, Peru	2nd	100 m	11.72 (-1.0 m/s)
2013	Bolivarian Games	Trujillo, Peru	1st	4x100 m relay	43.90
2014	South American Games	Santiago, Chile	1st	100 m	11.62
2014	South American Games	Santiago, Chile	3rd	4x100 m	45.13
2014	South American Games	Santiago, Chile	2nd	4x400 m	3:35.96
2014	Ibero-American Championships	São Paulo, Brazil	4th	200 m	23.68
2014	Pan American Sports Festival	Mexico City, Mexico	6th	100m	11.82 A (-2.5 m/s)
2014	Pan American Sports Festival	Mexico City, Mexico	6th	200m	23.92 w A (+2.1 m/s)
2014	Central American and Caribbean Games	Xalapa, Mexico	2nd	200m	23.52 A (-1.6 m/s)
2014	Central American and Caribbean Games	Xalapa, Mexico	2nd	4x100m relay	44.02 A
2016	Ibero-American Championships	Rio de Janeiro, Brazil	13th (h)	200 m	24.63
2016	Ibero-American Championships	Rio de Janeiro, Brazil	4th	4x100 m relay	44.14
