= Jorge Vides =

Brazilian sprinter (born 1992)

Personal information
- Born: 24 November 1992 (age 33) Rio de Janeiro, Brazil
- Height: 1.92 m (6 ft 3 1/2 in)
- Weight: 74 kg (163 lb)

Sport
- Sport: Track and field
- Events: 100 metres, 200 metres

Achievements and titles
- Personal bests: 100 m: 10.08 (2018); 200 m: 20.34 (2018)
Medal record
Representing Brazil
Pan American Games
Gold medal – first place	2019 Lima	4×100 m relay
South American Championships
Gold medal – first place	2013 Cartagena	4 × 100 m relay
Bronze medal – third place	2013 Cartagena	200 m

Jorge Henrique da Costa Vides (born 24 November 1992) is a Brazilian track and field sprinter who competes in the 100 metres and 200 metres. He represented his country at the 2016 Summer Olympics. He holds a 200 m personal best of 20.34 seconds.

Vides is a frequent member of the Brazilian 4 × 100 metres relay team. He won gold in the relay at the 2012 South American Under-23 Championships in Athletics and graduated to senior gold in the event at the 2013 South American Championships in Athletics. He took an individual 200 m medal at that event, taking the bronze. He won a 200 m and relay gold medal double at the 2014 Ibero-American Championships in Athletics held in São Paulo. He placed fourth at the IAAF World Relays with Brazil in both 2014 and 2015.

At the 2016 Rio Olympics in his home town of Rio de Janeiro, he ran in the 200 m heats and teamed up with Ricardo de Souza, Vitor Hugo dos Santos, and Bruno de Barros to take sixth in the relay final.

He competed at the 2020 Summer Olympics.

== Personal bests ==
- 100 m: 10.08 (wind: +0.3 m/s) – (Brazil) São Bernardo do Campo, 18 Aug 2018
- 200 m: 20.34 (wind: +0.1 m/s) – (Peru) Trujillo, 26 Aug 2018
- 4 × 100 m relay: 38.01 – (United Kingdom) London, 21 Jul 2019

All information from World Athletics profile.

== International competitions ==
Year	Competition	Venue	Position	Event	Notes
2012	South American U23 Championships	São Paulo, Brazil	5th	100 m	10.73
2012	South American U23 Championships	São Paulo, Brazil	4th	200 m	21.12
2012	South American U23 Championships	São Paulo, Brazil	1st	4 × 100 m relay	40.10
2013	South American Championships	Cartagena, Colombia	3rd	200 m	20.71
2013	South American Championships	Cartagena, Colombia	1st	4 × 100 m relay	39.47
2014	World Relays	Nassau, Bahamas	4th	4 × 100 m relay	38.40
2014	Ibero-American Championships	São Paulo, Brazil	1st	200 m	20.42
2014	Ibero-American Championships	São Paulo, Brazil	1st	4 × 100 m relay	39.35
2015	World Relays	Nassau, Bahamas	4th	4 × 100 m relay	38.63
2016	Ibero-American Championships	Rio de Janeiro, Brazil	6th	100 m	10.36
2016	Ibero-American Championships	Rio de Janeiro, Brazil	2nd	4 × 100 m relay	38.65
2016	Olympic Games	Rio de Janeiro, Brazil	33rd (h)	200 m	20.50
2016	Olympic Games	Rio de Janeiro, Brazil	6th	4 × 100 m relay	38.41
2018	Ibero-American Championships	Trujillo, Peru	2nd	100 m	10.27
2018	Ibero-American Championships	Trujillo, Peru	1st	200 m	20.34
2018	Ibero-American Championships	Trujillo, Peru	1st	4 × 100 m relay	38.78
2019	World Relays	Yokohama, Japan	1st	4 × 100 m relay	38.05
2019	World Relays	Yokohama, Japan	–	4 × 200 m relay	DNF
2019	Pan American Games	Lima, Peru	11th (h)	200 m	20.80
2019	Pan American Games	Lima, Peru	1st	4 × 100 m relay	38.27
2021	Olympic Games	Tokyo, Japan	35th (h)	200 m	20.94
2023	South American Championships	São Paulo, Brazil	3rd	200 m	20.59
2023	World Championships	Budapest, Hungary	34th (h)	200 m	20.80
2023	World Championships	Budapest, Hungary	–	4 × 100 m relay	DQ
2024	Ibero-American Championships	Cuiabá, Brazil	10th (h)	200 m	20.97
