= Jonathan Mendes (athlete) =

Brazilian hurdler (born 1990)

Personal information
- Born: 14 April 1990 (age 35) Rio de Janeiro, Brazil
- Education: Santa Anna University Centre
- Height: 1.87 m (6 ft 2 in)
- Weight: 78 kg (172 lb)

Sport
- Sport: Track and field
- Event: 110 metres hurdles
- Club: BM&F Bovespa
- Coached by: Katsuhico Nakaya

Jonathan do Nascimento do Paraizo Mendes (born 14 April 1990) is a Brazilian hurdler. He competed in the 110 metres hurdles event at the 2015 World Championships in Beijing without qualifying for the semifinals. His personal bests are 13.53 seconds in the 110 metres hurdles (+0.4 m/s, São Paulo 2014) and 7.82 seconds in the 60 metres hurdles (São Caetano do Sul 2014).

== Competition record ==
Year	Competition	Venue	Position	Event	Notes
Representing Brazil
2013	South American Championships	Cartagena, Colombia	3rd	110 m hurdles	13.84
2014	South American Games	Santiago, Chile	2nd	110 m hurdles	13.81
2014	Ibero-American Championships	São Paulo, Brazil	3rd	110 m hurdles	13.70
2015	Pan American Games	Toronto, Canada	17th (h)	110 m hurdles	13.81
2015	World Championships	Beijing, China	31st (h)	110 m hurdles	13.86
2017	Universiade	Taipei, Taiwan	18th (h)	110 m hurdles	14.40
