= Joelma Sousa =

Brazilian sprinter (born 1984)

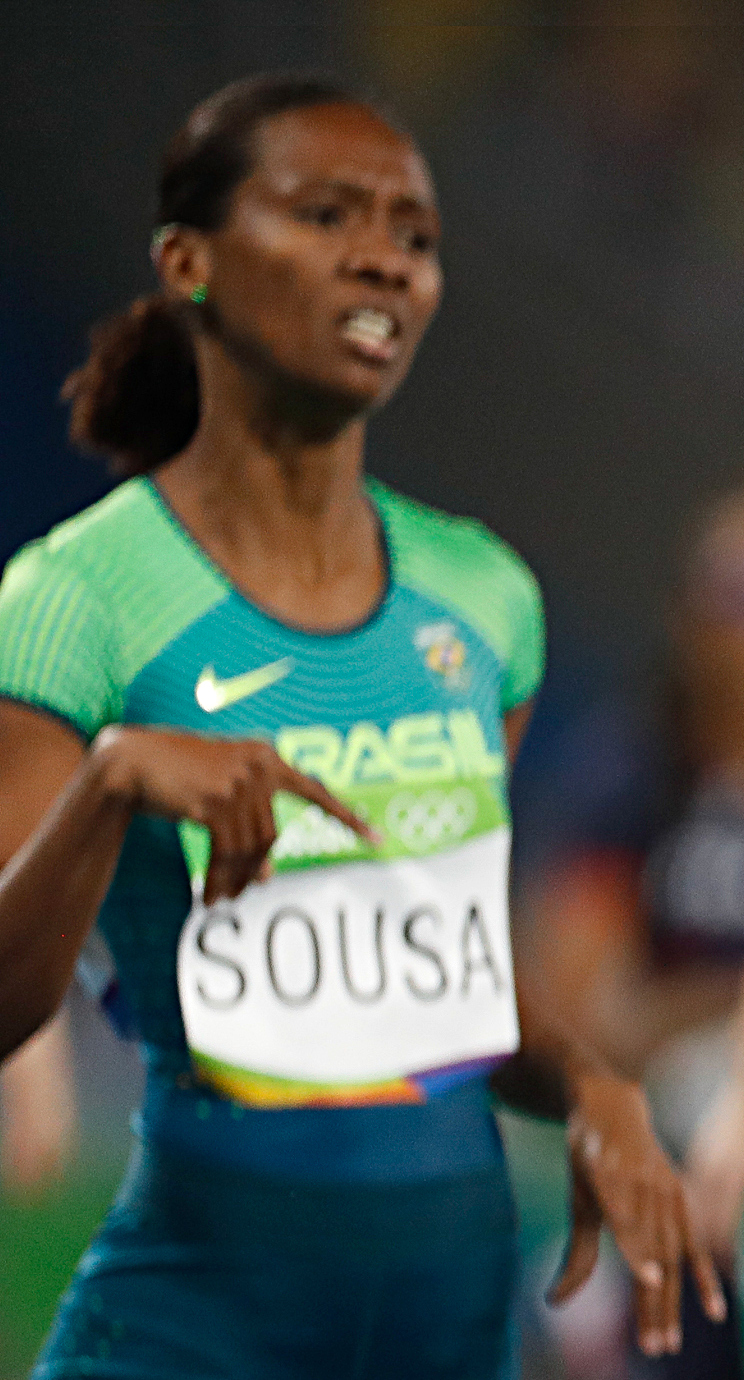
- Souza at the 2016 Olympics

Personal information
- Full name: Joelma das Neves Sousa
- Born: 13 July 1984 (age 41) Timon, Maranhão, Brazil
- Height: 1.72 m (5 ft 8 in)
- Weight: 49 kg (108 lb)

Sport
- Country: Brazil
- Sport: Athletics
- Event: 400 m
- Club: Pinheiros
- Coached by: Sanderlei Parrela

Achievements and titles
- Personal best: 400 m – 51.54 (2012)
- Updated on 15 April 2014

Joelma das Neves Sousa (born 13 July 1984) is a Brazilian sprinter who specializes in the 400 metres. She represented Brazil at the 2012 and 2016 Summer Olympics.

== Achievements ==
Year	Competition	Venue	Position	Event	Notes
Representing Brazil
2011	South American Championships	Buenos Aires, Argentina	4th	400 m	53.42
2011	South American Championships	Buenos Aires, Argentina	1st	4 × 400 m relay	3:31.66
2011	World Championships	Daegu, South Korea	18th (h)	4 × 100 m relay	3:32.43
2011	Pan American Games	Guadalajara, Mexico	6th	400 m	52.34 A
2011	Pan American Games	Guadalajara, Mexico	2nd	4 × 400 m relay	3:29.59 A
2012	Ibero-American Championships	Barquisimeto, Venezuela	3rd	400 m	52.72
2012	Ibero-American Championships	Barquisimeto, Venezuela	1st	4 × 400 m relay	3:28.56
2012	Olympic Games	London, United Kingdom	4th (h)	400 m	52.69
2012	Olympic Games	London, United Kingdom	7th (h)	4 × 400 m relay	3:32.95
2013	South American Championships	Cartagena, Colombia	1st	400 m	52.25
2013	South American Championships	Cartagena, Colombia	1st	4 × 400 m relay	3:35.37
2013	World Championships	Moscow, Russia	29th (h)	400 m	53.01
2014	South American Games	Santiago, Chile	3rd	400 m	52.75
2014	South American Games	Santiago, Chile	1st	4 × 400 m relay	3:35.07
2014	Ibero-American Championships	São Paulo, Brazil	3rd	400 m	53.04
2014	Ibero-American Championships	São Paulo, Brazil	1st	4 × 400 m relay	3:29.66
2016	Ibero-American Championships	Rio de Janeiro, Brazil	1st	4 × 400 m relay	3:32.30
2016	Olympic Games	Rio de Janeiro, Brazil	16th (h)	4 × 400 m relay	3:30.27
