= Athletics at the 2010 South American Games – Women's 4 × 400 metre relay =

The Women's 4x400m Relay event at the 2010 South American Games was held on March 23 at 18:55.

== Medalists ==
Gold	Silver	Bronze
Yaneth Largacha; María Alejandra Idrobo; Marcela Cuesta; Yenifer Padilla; Colombia	Barbara Leoncio; Elaine Paixão; Ana Claudia Silva; Barbara de Oliveira; Brazil	María Ayelén Diogo; Agustina Zerboni; Juliana Menéndez; María Florencia Lamboglia; Argentina

== Records ==
Standing records prior to the 2010 South American Games
World record	Soviet Union	3:15.17	Seoul, South Korea	1 October 1988
World Leading	University of Technology (JAM)	3:36.21	Kingston, Jamaica	27 February 2010
South American record	Brazil	3:26.82	Helsinki, Finland	13 August 2005
South American U23 record	Brazil	3:40.05	Barquisimeto, Venezuela	27 June 2004

== Results ==
Results were published.

Rank	Athlete	Nationality	Reaction	Result	Notes
1st place, gold medalist(s)	Yaneth Largacha; María Alejandra Idrobo; Marcela Cuesta; Yenifer Padilla	Colombia	0.388	3:40.09	
2nd place, silver medalist(s)	Barbara Leoncio; Elaine Paixão; Ana Claudia Silva; Barbara de Oliveira	Brazil	0.294	3:40.68	
3rd place, bronze medalist(s)	María Ayelén Diogo; Agustina Zerboni; Juliana Menéndez; María Florencia Lamboglia	Argentina	0.260	3:51.74	
–	Carla Cavero; Alison Sánchez; Marysabel Romero; Leslie Arnez	Bolivia	0.219	DSQ	^{†}

^{†}: Bolivia was initially 3rd in 3:51.04, but disqualified, because Alison Sánchez was tested positive for nandrolone.

== See also ==
- 2010 South American Under-23 Championships in Athletics
