= Liliane Parrela =

Brazilian athletics competitor

Personal information
- Full name: Liliane Cristina Barbosa Fernandes Parrela
- Born: Liliane Cristina Barbosa Fernandes; October 8, 1987 (age 38)

Sport
- Sport: Athletics
- Event: 400 metres hurdles
- Coached by: Sanderlei Parrela

Liliane Cristina Barbosa Fernandes Parrela (born 8 October 1987) is a Brazilian sprinter specialising in the 400 metres hurdles. She has won several medals at regional level.

Her personal bests are 52.55 seconds in the 400 metres (Belém 2013) and 57.38 seconds in the 400 metres hurdles (São Paulo 2013).

== International competitions ==
Year	Competition	Venue	Position	Event	Notes
Representing Brazil
2010	Ibero-American Championships	San Fernando, Spain	6th	400 m hurdles	59.46
2013	South American Championships	Cartagena, Colombia	1st	400 m hurdles	23.91
2013	South American Championships	Cartagena, Colombia	1st	4 × 400 m relay	3:35.37
2014	World Relays	Nassau, Bahamas	8th	4 × 400 m relay	3:31.59
2014	South American Games	Santiago, Chile	3rd	400 m hurdles	59.51
2014	South American Games	Santiago, Chile	1st	4 × 400 m relay	3:35.07
2014	Ibero-American Championships	São Paulo, Brazil	5th	400 m hurdles	61.86
2015	World Relays	Nassau, Bahamas	8th	4 × 400 m relay	3:31.30
2015	South American Championships	Lima, Peru	3rd	400 m	54.53
2015	South American Championships	Lima, Peru	3rd	400 m hurdles	58.44
2015	South American Championships	Lima, Peru	1st	4 × 400 m relay	3:34.51
2015	Pan American Games	Toronto, Canada	10th (h)	4 × 400 m relay	3:34.97
2016	Ibero-American Championships	Rio de Janeiro, Brazil	3rd	400 m hurdles	58.42
2022	Ibero-American Championships	La Nucía, Spain	2nd	400 m hurdles	3:32.50
2022	Ibero-American Championships	La Nucía, Spain	2nd	4 × 400 m relay	3:32.50
2022	South American Games	Asunción, Paraguay	3rd	400 m hurdles	57.92
2022	South American Games	Asunción, Paraguay	2nd	4 × 400 m relay	3:35.61
