= Guilherme Cobbo =

Brazilian high jumper

Personal information
- Born: 1 October 1987 (age 38) Uraí, Paraná, Brazil
- Weight: 65 kg (143 lb)

Sport
- Country: Brazil
- Sport: Athletics
- Event: High jump
Medal record
Men's Athletics
Representing Brazil
South American Championships
Silver medal – second place	2013 Cartagena	High jump
Lusophony Games
Gold medal – first place	2009 Lusophony Games	2.16 m
Bronze medal – third place	2006 Lusophony Games	2.10 m
- Updated on 16 July 2013

Guilherme Henrique Cobbo (born 1 October 1987 in Uraí) is a Brazilian athlete competing in the high jump. He competed at the 2012 Summer Olympics.

== Competition record ==
Year	Competition	Venue	Position	Notes
Representing Brazil
2004	South American Youth Championships	Guayaquil, Ecuador	6th	1.80 m
2005	Pan American Junior Championships	Windsor, Canada	3rd	2.15 m
2005	South American Junior Championships	Rosario, Argentina	2nd	2.09 m
2006	Lusophony Games	Macau	3rd	2.10 m
2006	World Junior Championships	Beijing, China	15th (q)	2.14 m
2006	South American U23 Championships / South American Games	Buenos Aires, Argentina	5th	2.08 m
2008	South American U23 Championships	Lima, Peru	2nd	2.14 m
2009	Lusophony Games	Lisbon, Portugal	1st	2.16 m
2010	Ibero-American Championships	San Fernando, Spain	4th	2.15 m
2011	South American Championships	Buenos Aires, Argentina	2nd	2.20 m
2012	Ibero-American Championships	Barquisimeto, Venezuela	2nd	2.25 m
2012	Olympic Games	London, United Kingdom	16th (q)	2.21 m
2013	South American Championships	Cartagena, Colombia	2nd	2.19 m
2014	Ibero-American Championships	São Paulo, Brazil	3rd	2.24 m
2016	Ibero-American Championships	Rio de Janeiro, Brazil	2nd	2.23 m
