= Lutimar Paes =

Brazilian middle-distance runner

Personal information
- Full name: Lutimar Abreu Paes
- Born: December 14, 1988 (age 37) Cruz Alta, Rio Grande do Sul, Brazil
- Height: 1.84 m (6 ft 0 in)
- Weight: 72 kg (159 lb)

Sport
- Country: Brazil
- Sport: Athletics
- Event: Middle-distance running
Medal record
Lusophony Games
Gold medal – first place	2009 Lusophony Games	800 m
- Updated on 1 May 2014

Lutimar Abreu Paes (born 12 December 1988 in Cruz Alta, Rio Grande do Sul) is a Brazilian middle-distance runner specialising in the 800 metres. He represented his country at the 2011 World Championships without qualifying for the final.

His personal best in the event is 1:45.32, set in Belém in 2011.

== Personal bests ==
- 800 m: 1:45.32 – (Brazil) Belém, 15 May 2011
- 1500 m: 3:43.93 – (Brazil) São Paulo, 22 February 2014

== Competition record ==
Year	Competition	Venue	Position	Event	Notes
Representing Brazil
2007	South American Junior Championships	São Paulo, Brazil	1st	800 m	1:50.95
2007	South American Junior Championships	São Paulo, Brazil	3rd	1500 m	3:56.82
2007	Pan American Junior Championships	São Paulo, Brazil	5th	800 m	1:50.01
2007	Pan American Junior Championships	São Paulo, Brazil	9th	1500 m	4:02.23
2009	Lusophony Games	Lisbon, Portugal	1st	800 m	1:48.89
2010	South American Games / South American U23 Championships	Medellín, Colombia	2nd	800 m	1:47.52
2011	Military World Games	Rio de Janeiro, Brazil	4th	800 m	1:46.69
2011	Universiade	Shenzhen, China	5th	800 m	1:47.23
2011	World Championships	Daegu, South Korea	34th (h)	800 m	1:48.97
2011	Pan American Games	Guadalajara, Mexico	6th	800 m	1:47.76
2013	South American Road Mile Championships	Belém, Brazil	3rd	One mile	4:07
2013	South American Championships	Cartagena, Colombia	3rd	800 m	1:48.50
2014	South American Games	Santiago, Chile	3rd	800 m	1:47.52
2014	South American Games	Santiago, Chile	–	1500 m	DNF
2014	Ibero-American Championships	São Paulo, Brazil	7th	800 m	1:47.75
2014	Ibero-American Championships	São Paulo, Brazil	–	1500 m	DNF
2016	Ibero-American Championships	Rio de Janeiro, Brazil	1st	800 m	1:45.42
2016	Olympic Games	Rio de Janeiro, Brazil	32nd (h)	800 m	1:48.38
2017	South American Championships	Asunción, Paraguay	2nd	800 m	1:50.27
