= Yeison Rivas =

Colombian hurdler (born 1987)

Personal information
- Born: 24 September 1987 (age 38) Carepa, Colombia
- Height: 1.73 m (5 ft 8 in)
- Weight: 66 kg (146 lb)

Sport
- Sport: Athletics
- Events: 110 m hurdles, 400 m hurdles

Yeison Javier Rivas Rivas (born 24 September 1987) is a Colombian hurdler. He represented his country in the 110 metres hurdles at the 2016 Summer Olympics without advancing from the first round. In addition, he won multiple medals on regional level.

His personal bests are 13.36 seconds in the 110 metres hurdles (+0.3 m/s, Medellín 2016) and 49.90 seconds in the 400 metres hurdles (Cali 2015). The latter is the current national record.

== International competitions ==
Year	Competition	Venue	Position	Event	Notes
Representing Colombia
2008	Central American and Caribbean Championships	Cali, Colombia	3rd	400 m hurdles	50.44
2008	Central American and Caribbean Championships	Cali, Colombia	5th	4 × 400 m relay	3:06.23
2009	South American Championships	Lima, Peru	3rd	400 m hurdles	50.87
2009	South American Championships	Lima, Peru	1st	4 × 100 m relay	39.41
2009	South American Championships	Lima, Peru	1st	4 × 400 m relay	3:06.22
2009	Central American and Caribbean Championships	Havana, Cuba	6th	400 m hurdles	50.14
2009	Central American and Caribbean Championships	Havana, Cuba	9th	4 × 400 m relay	3:10.65
2009	Bolivarian Games	Sucre, Bolivia	1st	400 m hurdles	50.67
2009	Bolivarian Games	Sucre, Bolivia	2nd	4 × 100 m relay	3:10.93
2011	South American Championships	Buenos Aires, Argentina	6th	400 m hurdles	52.33
2011	South American Championships	Buenos Aires, Argentina	2nd	4 × 400 m relay	3:09.67
2011	Central American and Caribbean Championships	Mayagüez, Puerto Rico	11th (h)	400 m hurdles	51.70
2013	South American Championships	Cartagena, Colombia	6th	110 m hurdles	14.01
2013	South American Championships	Cartagena, Colombia	2nd	4 × 100 m relay	39.76
2013	South American Championships	Cartagena, Colombia	2nd	4 × 400 m relay	3:06.25
2013	Bolivarian Games	Trujillo, Peru	4th	110 m hurdles	14.37
2013	Bolivarian Games	Trujillo, Peru	5th	400 m hurdles	50.69
2013	Bolivarian Games	Trujillo, Peru	3rd	4 × 100 m relay	39.86
2014	South American Games	Santiago, Chile	8th	110 m hurdles	14.29
2014	South American Games	Santiago, Chile	3rd	4 × 100 m relay	40.26
2016	Ibero-American Championships	Rio de Janeiro, Brazil	4th	110 m hurdles	13.64
2016	Olympic Games	Rio de Janeiro, Brazil	31st (h)	110 m hurdles	13.87
2017	South American Championships	Asunción, Paraguay	5th	110 m hurdles	13.95 (w)
2017	South American Championships	Asunción, Paraguay	5th	400 m hurdles	51.22
2017	Bolivarian Games	Santa Marta, Colombia	3rd	110 m hurdles	13.89
2017	Bolivarian Games	Santa Marta, Colombia	1st	400 m hurdles	50.47
