= Freddy Mezones =

Venezuelan sprinter

Personal information
- Full name: Freddy Alberto Mezones Bolivar
- Born: September 24, 1987 (age 38) Caracas, Venezuela
- Height: 1.70 m (5 ft 7 in)
- Weight: 68 kg (150 lb)

Sport
- Country: Venezuela
- Sport: Athletics
- Updated on 31 March 2016

Freddy Mezones (born 24 September 1987) is a Venezuelan sprinter specialising in the 400 metres. He competed in the 4 × 400 metres relay at the 2013 World Championships without qualifying for the final.

His personal best in the event is 45.53 seconds (Barinas 2015).

== Personal bests ==
- 400 m: 45.53 – Barinas, Venezuela, 17 April 2015
- 800 m: 1:52.53 – Barquisimeto, Venezuela, 19 June 2010

== Competition record ==
Year	Competition	Venue	Position	Event	Notes
Representing Venezuela
2008	Ibero-American Championships	Iquique, Chile	5th	400 m	47.93
2008	Ibero-American Championships	Iquique, Chile	4th	4 × 400 m relay	3:09.00
2008	Central American and Caribbean Championships	Cali, Colombia	13th (h)	400 m	47.48
2008	Central American and Caribbean Championships	Cali, Colombia	4th	4 × 400 m relay	3:06.10
2009	ALBA Games	Havana, Cuba	–	400 m	DNF
2009	ALBA Games	Havana, Cuba	2nd	4 × 400 m relay	3:10.04
2009	South American Championships	Cartagena, Colombia	2nd	400 m	46.28
2009	South American Championships	Cartagena, Colombia	–	4 × 400 m relay	DQ
2009	Central American and Caribbean Championships	Havana, Cuba	8th	400 m	47.39
2009	Central American and Caribbean Championships	Havana, Cuba	8th	4 × 400 m relay	3:09.61
2009	Bolivarian Games	Sucre, Bolivia	3rd	400 m	46.97 A
2009	Bolivarian Games	Sucre, Bolivia	1st	4 × 400 m relay	3:06.91 A
2010	Ibero-American Championships	San Fernando, Spain	5th	400 m	46.25
2010	Ibero-American Championships	San Fernando, Spain	3rd	4 × 400 m relay	3:05.53
2010	Central American and Caribbean Games	Mayagüez, Puerto Rico	6th	400 m	45.93
2010	Central American and Caribbean Games	Mayagüez, Puerto Rico	6th	4 × 400 m relay	3:07.98
2012	World Indoor Championships	Istanbul, Turkey	9th (h)	4 × 400 m relay	3:11.11
2013	South American Championships	Cartagena, Colombia	2nd (h)	400 m	46.48
2013	South American Championships	Cartagena, Colombia	1st	4 × 400 m relay	3:03.64
2013	World Championships	Moscow, Russia	9th (h)	4 × 400 m relay	3:02.04
2014	South American Games	Santiago, Chile	3rd	400 m	45.86
2014	South American Games	Santiago, Chile	2nd	4 × 400 m relay	3:04.17
2014	IAAF World Relays	Nassau, Bahamas	6th	4 × 400 m relay	3:01.44
2014	Central American and Caribbean Games	Xalapa, Mexico	2nd	4 × 400 m relay	3:01.80 A
2015	IAAF World Relays	Nassau, Bahamas	13th (h)	4 × 400 m relay	3:06.15
2015	South American Championships	Lima, Peru	3rd	400 m	45.67
2015	South American Championships	Lima, Peru	1st	4 × 400 m relay	3:04.96
2015	Pan American Games	Toronto, Canada	7th	4 × 400 m relay	3:03.47
2015	World Championships	Beijing, China	14th (h)	4 × 400 m relay	3:02.96
2016	Ibero-American Championships	Rio de Janeiro, Brazil	3rd	4 × 400 m relay	3:03.61
2016	Olympic Games	Rio de Janeiro, Brazil	12th (h)	4 × 400 m relay	3:02.69
2018	South American Games	Cochabamba, Bolivia	2nd	4 × 400 m relay	3:05.75
