= Wagner Cardoso =

Brazilian sprinter (born 1989)

Personal information
- Born: 20 March 1989 (age 36) Rio de Janeiro, Brazil

Sport
- Sport: Track and field

Wagner Francisco Cardoso (born 20 March 1989) is a Brazilian sprinter specialising in the 400 metres. He finished seventh at the 2013 World Championships with the Brazilian 4 × 400 metres relay team.

His 400 metres personal best is 45.80, set in 2013.

== Competition record ==
Year	Competition	Venue	Position	Event	Notes
Representing Brazil
2006	South American Youth Championships	Caracas, Venezuela	4th	400 m	48.15
2006	South American Youth Championships	Caracas, Venezuela	1st	Medley relay	1:53.67
2007	South American Junior Championships	São Paulo, Brazil	1st	4 × 400 m relay	3:08.68
2008	South American U23 Championships	Lima, Peru	1st	4 × 400 m relay	3:09.02
2010	Ibero-American Championships	San Fernando, Spain	13th (h)	400 m	47.50
2010	Ibero-American Championships	San Fernando, Spain	2nd	4 × 400 m relay	3:05.43
2011	South American Championships	Buenos Aires, Argentina	1st	4 × 400 m relay	3:08.95
2013	South American Championships	Cartagena, Colombia	2nd	400 m	46.38
2013	South American Championships	Cartagena, Colombia	3rd	4 × 400 m relay	3:08.60
2013	World Championships	Moscow, Russia	7th	4 × 400 m relay	3:02.19
2014	Ibero-American Championships	São Paulo, Brazil	2nd	4 × 400 m relay	3:02.80
2015	IAAF World Relays	Nassau, Bahamas	5th	4 × 400 m relay	3:00.96
2015	World Championships	Beijing, China	12th (h)	4 × 400 m relay	3:01.05
2016	Ibero-American Championships	Rio de Janeiro, Brazil	–	4 × 400 m relay	DQ
