= José Luis Rojas =

Peruvian long-distance runner

Personal information
- Full name: José Luis Rojas Ramos
- Born: 5 April 1992 (age 34)

Sport
- Sport: Athletics
- Event(s): 5000 m, 10,000 m

José Luis Rojas Ramos (born 5 April 1992 in Junín) is a Peruvian long-distance runner. He won two medals at the 2018 Ibero-American Championships, in addition to a silver won at the 2013 South American Championships.

== International competitions ==
Year	Competition	Venue	Position	Event	Notes
Representing Peru
2011	Pan American Junior Championships	Miramar, United States	2nd	5000 m	14:58.47
2011	Pan American Junior Championships	Miramar, United States	5th	10,000 m	33:58.58
2012	South American U23 Championships	São Paulo, Brazil	5th	5000 m	14:38.27
2012	South American U23 Championships	São Paulo, Brazil	2nd	10,000 m	30:32.82
2013	South American Championships	Cartagena, Colombia	10th	5000 m	14:45.50
2013	South American Championships	Cartagena, Colombia	2nd	10,000 m	30:13.10
2013	Bolivarian Games	Trujillo, Peru	5th	5000 m	14:18.20
2013	Bolivarian Games	Trujillo, Peru	5th	10,000 m	30:07.84
2014	South American U23 Championships	Montevideo, Uruguay	2nd	5000 m	14:02.37
2015	South American Championships	Lima, Peru	4th	5000 m	14:11.27
2016	Ibero-American Championships	Rio de Janeiro, Brazil	7th	5000 m	14:19.14
2017	Bolivarian Games	Santa Marta, Colombia	3rd	5000 m	14:07.48
2018	Ibero-American Championships	Trujillo, Peru	3rd	3000 m	8:04.00
2018	Ibero-American Championships	Trujillo, Peru	1st	5000 m	13:42.38
2019	South American Championships	Lima, Peru	2nd	5000 m	13:53.11
2019	Pan American Games	Lima, Peru	6th	5000 m	13:57.77
2023	South American Championships	São Paulo, Brazil	4th	10,000 m	29:15.91
2023	Pan American Games	Santiago, Chile	9th	10,000 m	30:11.02
2025	Bolivarian Games	Lima, Peru	1st	5000 m	13:41.34

== Personal bests ==
Outdoor

- 1500 metres – 4:00.3 (Lima 2012)
- 3000 metres – 8:04.00 (Trujillo 2018)
- 5000 metres – 13:38.6 (Lima 2018)
- 10,000 metres – 29:16.15 (Lima 2016)
- 10 kilometres – 30:14 (Lima 2017)
- Half marathon – 1:05:40 (Lima 2014)
