= Bernardo Baloyes =

Colombian sprinter (born 1994)

Personal information
- Nationality: Colombian
- Born: January 6, 1994 (age 32) Fuerte Island, Colombia
- Height: 1.71 m (5 ft 7 in)
- Weight: 57 kg (126 lb)

Sport
- Country: Colombia
- Sport: Athletics
- Events: 100 metres; 200 metres; 300 metres; 400 metres; 4×100 metres; 4×400 metres; Mixed relay
- Club: Liga de Antioquia

Achievements and titles
- Personal bests: 100 metres: 10.18 (2019); 200 metres: 20.00 NR (2018); 300 metres: 33.70 (2019); 400 metres: 45.68 (2014); 4×100 metres: 38.97 (2018); 4×400 metres: 3:01.49 (2016); Mixed relay: 3:16.07 (2025)
Medal record
Representing Colombia
Men's athletics
Event	1st	2nd	3rd
Ibero-American Championships	1	1	0
CAC Games	1	0	1
South American Games	2	0	1
South American Championships	2	2	1
Bolivarian Games	1	2	0
Total	7	5	3
Ibero-American Championships
Gold medal – first place	2016 Rio de Janeiro	4×400 m relay
Silver medal – second place	2014 São Paulo	200 m
Central American and Caribbean Games
Gold medal – first place	2018 Barranquilla	200 m
Bronze medal – third place	2014 Veracruz	4×400 m relay
South American Games
Gold medal – first place	2018 Cochabamba	4×100 m relay
Gold medal – first place	2018 Cochabamba	4×400 m relay
Bronze medal – third place	2018 Cochabamba	200 m
South American Championships
Gold medal – first place	2017 Asunción	200 m
Gold medal – first place	2019 Lima	200 m
Silver medal – second place	2013 Cartagena	200 m
Silver medal – second place	2017 Asunción	4×100 m relay
Bronze medal – third place	2019 Lima	4×100 m relay
Bolivarian Games
Gold medal – first place	2025 Lima-Ayacucho	Mixed relay
Silver medal – second place	2017 Santa Marta	200 m
Silver medal – second place	2017 Santa Marta	4×100 m relay

Bernardo Baloyes Navas (born 6 January 1994) is a Colombian athlete sprinter specialising in the 200 metres. He represented his country at the 2013 World Championships in Athletics without advancing from the first round.

He represented Colombia at the 2020 Summer Olympics.

== International competitions ==
Year	Competition	Venue	Position	Event	Notes
Representing Colombia
2011	World U18 Championships	Villeneuve-d'Ascq, France	15th (sf)	200 m	21.59 s
2011	World U18 Championships	Villeneuve-d'Ascq, France	—N/a	400 m	DQ
2011	South American U20 Championships	Medellín, Colombia	2nd	400 m	47.05 s
2011	South American U20 Championships	Medellín, Colombia	2nd	4 × 100 m relay	40.08 s
2011	South American U20 Championships	Medellín, Colombia	2nd	4 × 400 m relay	3:08.71
2012	South American U23 Championships	São Paulo, Brazil	2nd	200 m	20.87 s
2012	South American U23 Championships	São Paulo, Brazil	2nd	4 × 100 m relay	40.14 s
2013	South American Championships	Cartagena, Colombia	2nd	200 m	20.71 s
2013	World Championships	Moscow, Russia	54th (h)	200 m	22.37 s
2014	Ibero-American Championships	São Paulo, Brazil	2nd	200 m	20.43 s NR
2014	South American U23 Championships	Montevideo, Uruguay	2nd	400 m	46.11 s
2014	South American U23 Championships	Montevideo, Uruguay	3rd	4 × 400 m relay	3:11.95
2014	Central American and Caribbean Games	Xalapa, Mexico	11th (h)	400 m	47.03 s
2014	Central American and Caribbean Games	Xalapa, Mexico	3rd	4 × 400 m relay	3:02.52
2015	World Relays	Nassau, Bahamas	18th (h)	4 × 400 m relay	3:06.48
2015	Pan American Games	Toronto, Canada	20th (h)	200 m	20.89 s w
2016	Ibero-American Championships	Rio de Janeiro, Brazil	4th	200 m	20.60 s
2016	Ibero-American Championships	Rio de Janeiro, Brazil	1st	4 × 400 m relay	3:01.88 NR
2016	Olympic Games	Rio de Janeiro, Brazil	58th (h)	200 m	20.78 s
2017	South American Championships	Asunción, Paraguay	1st	200 m	20.36 s
2017	South American Championships	Asunción, Paraguay	2nd	4 × 100 m relay	39.67 s
2017	World Championships	London, United Kingdom	39th (h)	200 m	20.86 s
2017	Bolivarian Games	Santa Marta, Colombia	2nd	200 m	20.77 s
2017	Bolivarian Games	Santa Marta, Colombia	2nd	4 × 100 m relay	39.58 s
2018	South American Games	Cochabamba, Bolivia	3rd	200 m	20.28 s
2018	South American Games	Cochabamba, Bolivia	1st	4 × 100 m relay	38.97 s NR
2018	South American Games	Cochabamba, Bolivia	1st	4 × 400 m relay	3:04.78
2018	Central American and Caribbean Games	Barranquilla, Colombia	1st	200 m	20.13 s
2018	Central American and Caribbean Games	Barranquilla, Colombia	6th	4 × 100 m relay	39.17 s
2019	World Relays	Yokohama, Japan	8th (B)	4 × 400 m relay	3:07.52
2019	South American Championships	Lima, Peru	1st	200 m	20.42 s CR
2019	South American Championships	Lima, Peru	3rd	4 × 100 m relay	39.94 s
2019	Pan American Games	Lima, Peru	—N/a	200 m	DQ
2019	World Championships	Doha, Qatar	33rd (h)	200 m	20.64 s
2021	Olympic Games	Tokyo, Japan	—N/a	200 m	DNS
2023	South American Championships	São Paulo, Brazil	—N/a	4 × 100 m relay	DNF
2025	Bolivarian Games	Lima, Peru	—N/a	400 m	DQ
2025	Bolivarian Games	Lima, Peru	4th	4 × 400 m relay	3:11.22
2025	Bolivarian Games	Lima, Peru	1st	Mixed relay	3:20.08

== Personal bests ==
Outdoor

- 100 metres – 10.18 (+1.2 m/s, Barranquilla 2019)
- 200 metres – 20.00 NR (+0.3 m/s, Barranquilla 2018)
- 400 metres – 45.68 (Medellín 2014)
