= José Meléndez (sprinter) =

Venezuelan sprinter (born 1993)

Personal information
- Full name: José Daniel Meléndez Mayorga
- Born: 19 May 1993 (age 33) Calabozo or Zaraza, Guárico, Venezuela
- Height: 1.70 m (5 ft 7 in)
- Weight: 65 kg (143 lb)

Sport
- Country: Venezuela
- Sport: Athletics
- Event: Sprinting
Medal record
Men's Athletics
Representing Venezuela
South American Championships
Gold medal – first place	2013 Cartagena	400 m
Gold medal – first place	2013 Cartagena	4x400 m relay
- Updated on 20 January 2015

José Daniel Meléndez Mayorga (born 19 May 1993) is a Venezuelan sprinter. He competed in the 4 × 400 m relay event at the 2012 Summer Olympics.

== Personal bests ==
- 200 m: 20.94 (wind: +1.1 m/s) – Barquisimeto, Venezuela, 25 August 2012
- 400 m: 45.82 – Moscow, Russia, 11 August 2013

== Achievements ==
Year	Competition	Venue	Position	Event	Notes
Representing Venezuela
2012	Ibero-American Championships	Barquisimeto, Venezuela	2nd	4 × 400 m relay	3:01.70
2012	World Junior Championships	Barcelona, Spain	13th (sf)	400 m	46.83
2012	Olympic Games	London, United Kingdom	8th (h)	4 × 400 m relay	3:02.62
2012	South American Under-23 Championships	São Paulo, Brazil	—	400m	DNF
2013	South American Championships	Cartagena, Colombia	1st	400 m	46.31
2013	South American Championships	Cartagena, Colombia	1st	4 × 400 m relay	3:03.64
2013	World Championships	Moscow, Russia	22nd (sf)	400 m	46.22
2013	World Championships	Moscow, Russia	9th (h)	4 × 400 m relay	3:02.04
2014	South American Games	Santiago, Chile	2nd	4 × 400 m relay	3:04.17
2014	World Relays	Nassau, Bahamas	6th	4 × 400 m relay	3:00.44
2014	South American Under-23 Championships	Montevideo, Uruguay	1st	400m	46.07
2014	South American Under-23 Championships	Montevideo, Uruguay	6th	4 × 100 m relay	41.95
2014	Central American and Caribbean Games	Xalapa, Mexico	3rd (h)	400m	46.62 A
2014	Central American and Caribbean Games	Xalapa, Mexico	2nd	4 × 400 m relay	3:01.80 A
2015	IAAF World Relays	Nassau, Bahamas	13th (h)	4 × 400 m relay	3:06.15
2015	South American Championships	Lima, Peru	4th	200 m	21.29
2015	South American Championships	Lima, Peru	1st	4 × 400 m relay	3:04.96
2015	Pan American Games	Toronto, Canada	7th	4 × 400 m relay	3:03.47
2015	World Championships	Beijing, China	14th (h)	4 × 400 m relay	3:02.96
2018	South American Games	Cochabamba, Bolivia	5th	400 m	46.62
2018	South American Games	Cochabamba, Bolivia	2nd	4 × 400 m relay	3:05.75
2018	Central American and Caribbean Games	Barranquilla, Colombia	–	400 m	DNF
2018	Central American and Caribbean Games	Barranquilla, Colombia	4th	4 × 400 m relay	3:06.62
