= César Ruiz (athlete) =

Cuban sprinter

Personal information
- Born: January 18, 1995 (age 31)
- Height: 1.84 m (6 ft 1/2 in)
- Weight: 77 kg (170 lb)

Sport
- Country: Cuba
- Sport: Track and field
- Event: 4 × 100 m relay

César Yadiel Ruíz (born January 18, 1995) is a Cuban sprinter. He competed at the 2016 Summer Olympics in the 4 × 100 metres relay, however he and his relay team did not progress from their heat.
