= Diana Landi =

Ecuadorian long-distance runner

Personal information
- Full name: Diana Judith Landi Andrade
- Born: 11 April 1986 (age 39)

Sport
- Country: Ecuador
- Event: Long-distance running

Diana Judith Landi Andrade (born 11 April 1986) is an Ecuadorian long-distance runner.

In 2017, she competed in the senior women's race at the 2017 IAAF World Cross Country Championships held in Kampala, Uganda. She finished in 52nd place.

In 2018, she competed in the women's half marathon at the 2018 IAAF World Half Marathon Championships held in Valencia, Spain. She finished in 100th place.

In 2019, she competed in the women's 10,000 metres at the 2019 Pan American Games held in Lima, Peru. She finished in 11th place.
