= Carlos Lemos (athlete) =

Colombian sprinter (born 1988)

Personal information
- Full name: Carlos Andrés Lemos Romaña
- Born: 3 June 1988 (age 38)
- Height: 1.83 m (6 ft 0 in)
- Weight: 76 kg (168 lb)

Sport
- Country: Colombia
- Sport: Athletics
- Club: Federación Deportiva Militar

Carlos Andrés Lemos Romaña (born 3 June 1988) is a Colombian sprinter. He competed in the men's 4 × 400 metres relay at the 2016 Summer Olympics. He competed at the 2020 Summer Olympics.
