= 2006 South American Championships in Athletics – Results =

These are the official results of the 2006 South American Championships in Athletics which took place from September 29 through October 1, 2006 in Tunja, Colombia.

== Men's results ==
=== 100 meters ===
Heats – September 29
Wind:
Heat 1: -2.8 m/s, Heat 2: -3.8 m/s

Rank	Heat	Name	Nationality	Time	Notes
1	2	Daniel Grueso	Colombia	10.54	Q
2	2	Vicente de Lima	Brazil	10.61	Q
3	2	Kael Becerra	Chile	10.65	Q
4	1	José Carlos Moreira	Brazil	10.74	Q
4	2	Franklin Nazareno	Ecuador	10.74	q
6	1	Luis Morán	Ecuador	10.82	Q
7	2	José Manuel Garaventa	Argentina	10.84	q
8	1	Harlin Echavarría	Colombia	10.86	Q
9	1	Iván Altamirano	Argentina	10.91	
10	1	Rawle Greene	Guyana	10.91	
	2	Eliezer de Almeida*	Brazil	10.68	
	1	Juan Venegas*	Ecuador	11.04	PB
	1	Heber Viera	Uruguay	DQ	

Final – September 29
Wind:
-2.0 m/s

Rank	Name	Nationality	Time	Notes
1st place, gold medalist(s)	Daniel Grueso	Colombia	10.50	
2nd place, silver medalist(s)	Kael Becerra	Chile	10.50	
3rd place, bronze medalist(s)	José Carlos Moreira	Brazil	10.51	
4	Harlin Echavarría	Colombia	10.63	
5	José Manuel Garaventa	Argentina	10.72	
6	Franklin Nazareno	Ecuador	10.77	SB
7	Luis Morán	Ecuador	10.79	
	Vicente de Lima	Brazil	DNF	

=== 200 meters ===
Heats – September 30
Wind:
Heat 1: -2.8 m/s, Heat 2: -3.8 m/s

Rank	Heat	Name	Nationality	Time	Notes
1	2	Heber Viera	Uruguay	21.27	Q
2	2	Fernando de Almeida	Brazil	21.42	Q
3	2	Mariano Jiménez	Argentina	21.44	Q
4	1	Basílio de Moraes Júnior	Brazil	21.58	Q
5	1	Daniel Grueso	Colombia	21.67	Q
6	2	Juan Venegas	Ecuador	21.68	q, PB
7	1	Iván Altamirano	Argentina	21.77	Q
7	2	Rawle Greene	Guyana	21.77	q, SB
9	1	Franklin Nazareno	Ecuador	22.15	
	1	Kael Becerra	Chile	DNS	

Final – September 30
Wind:
-1.3 m/s

Rank	Name	Nationality	Time	Notes
1st place, gold medalist(s)	Basílio de Moraes Júnior	Brazil	20.70	SB
2nd place, silver medalist(s)	Daniel Grueso	Colombia	20.99	
3rd place, bronze medalist(s)	Heber Viera	Uruguay	21.10	
4	Mariano Jiménez	Argentina	21.30	PB
5	Fernando de Almeida	Brazil	21.40	
6	Iván Altamirano	Argentina	21.63	
7	Juan Venegas	Ecuador	22.18	
	Rawle Greene	Guyana	DNS	

=== 400 meters ===
Heats – September 29

Rank	Heat	Name	Nationality	Time	Notes
1	1	Sanderlei Parrela	Brazil	46.70	Q
2	2	Eduardo Vasconcelos	Brazil	46.73	Q
3	1	Josner Rodríguez	Venezuela	47.31	Q
4	1	Geiner Mosquera	Colombia	47.39	Q
5	2	Javier Mosquera	Colombia	47.41	Q
6	1	Gustavo Aguirre	Argentina	47.77	q
7	2	Roberto Lineros	Venezuela	49.20	Q, PB
8	2	Roberto Zabala	Ecuador	49.71	q
9	1	Luis Gárate	Ecuador	49.91	
	2	Fernando de Almeida	Brazil	46.25	PB

Final – September 29

Rank	Name	Nationality	Time	Notes
1st place, gold medalist(s)	Sanderlei Parrela	Brazil	46.19	
2nd place, silver medalist(s)	Eduardo Vasconcelos	Brazil	46.65	
3rd place, bronze medalist(s)	Javier Mosquera	Colombia	46.88	
4	Geiner Mosquera	Colombia	47.55	
5	Gustavo Aguirre	Argentina	47.86	
6	Roberto Zabala	Ecuador	49.60	PB
7	Roberto Lineros	Venezuela	49.70	
8	Josner Rodríguez	Venezuela	50.84	

=== 800 meters ===
October 1

Rank	Name	Nationality	Time	Notes
1st place, gold medalist(s)	Fabiano Peçanha	Brazil	1:49.55	
2nd place, silver medalist(s)	Hudson de Souza	Brazil	1:49.97	
3rd place, bronze medalist(s)	Jhon Chávez	Colombia	1:51.81	
4	Féderico Padilla	Colombia	1:51.97	SB
5	Eduar Villanueva	Venezuela	1:52.91	
6	Rodrigo Trinidad	Paraguay	1:54.07	
7	Leonardo Price	Argentina	1:54.99	
8	Juan Matute	Ecuador	1:56.52	SB

=== 1500 meters ===
September 30

Rank	Name	Nationality	Time	Notes
1st place, gold medalist(s)	Hudson de Souza	Brazil	3:46.98	
2nd place, silver medalist(s)	Freddy Espinoza	Colombia	3:50.82	
3rd place, bronze medalist(s)	Bayron Piedra	Ecuador	3:54.48	SB
4	Fabiano Peçanha	Brazil	3:59.27	
5	Jhon Chávez	Colombia	4:05.13	
6	Juan Matute	Ecuador	4:08.21	PB

=== 5000 meters ===
October 1

Rank	Name	Nationality	Time	Notes
1st place, gold medalist(s)	Juan Diego Contreras	Peru	14:59.06	PB
2nd place, silver medalist(s)	Byron Piedra	Ecuador	15:00.00	SB
3rd place, bronze medalist(s)	Eduardo Arequipa	Bolivia	15:00.70	PB
4	Óscar Robayo	Colombia	15:03.00	
5	Jacinto López	Colombia	15:13.23	SB
6	Edgar Chancusig	Ecuador	15:24.62	PB
7	Ubiratán dos Santos	Brazil	15:31.04	
8	Gustavo Altez	Brazil	15:51.19	PB
	Jaime Segundo*	Ecuador	15:26.86	PB

=== 10,000 meters ===
September 29

Rank	Name	Nationality	Time	Notes
1st place, gold medalist(s)	Jacinto López	Colombia	31:41.01	PB
2nd place, silver medalist(s)	Juan Diego Contreras	Peru	31:41.58	PB
3rd place, bronze medalist(s)	Jason Gutiérrez	Colombia	31:44.25	PB
4	Ubiratán dos Santos	Brazil	31:46.05	
5	Jaime Segundo	Ecuador	31:52.13	PB
6	Edgar Chancusig	Ecuador	32:12.25	PB

=== 110 meters hurdles ===
September 29
Wind: -3.0 m/s

Rank	Name	Nationality	Time	Notes
1st place, gold medalist(s)	Paulo Villar	Colombia	13.62	
2nd place, silver medalist(s)	Anselmo da Silva	Brazil	13.78	
3rd place, bronze medalist(s)	Matheus Facho Inocêncio	Brazil	13.84	
4	Francisco Castro	Chile	14.84	SB
5	Jhon Tamayo	Ecuador	14.86	PB

=== 400 meters hurdles ===
Heats – September 30

Rank	Heat	Name	Nationality	Time	Notes
1	1	Tiago Bueno	Brazil	51.41	Q
2	1	Amilkar Torres	Colombia	51.76	Q
3	2	Raphael Fernandes	Brazil	51.85	Q
4	1	José Ignacio Pignataro	Argentina	52.07	Q
5	1	Jonathan Gibson	Panama	52.34	q
6	2	Víctor Solarte	Venezuela	52.67	Q
7	2	Luis Montenegro	Chile	52.78	Q
8	2	Juan Pablo Maturana	Colombia	52.80	q
9	2	Christian Deymonnaz	Argentina	53.34	
10	1	Carlos Jaramillo	Ecuador	55.70	PB
	1	José Céspedes	Venezuela	DNF	

Final – September 30

Rank	Name	Nationality	Time	Notes
1st place, gold medalist(s)	Tiago Bueno	Brazil	49.96	
2nd place, silver medalist(s)	Luis Montenegro	Chile	50.17	PB
3rd place, bronze medalist(s)	Raphael Fernandes	Brazil	50.49	
4	José Ignacio Pignataro	Argentina	51.38	SB
5	Víctor Solarte	Venezuela	52.32	
6	Amilkar Torres	Colombia	52.35	
7	Jonathan Gibson	Panama	53.77	
8	Juan Pablo Maturana	Colombia	54.75	

=== 3000 meters steeplechase ===
October 1

Rank	Name	Nationality	Time	Notes
1st place, gold medalist(s)	Sergio Lobos	Chile	9:15.42	
2nd place, silver medalist(s)	Diego Moreno	Peru	9:21.28	
3rd place, bronze medalist(s)	Gládson Barbosa	Brazil	9:22.51	
4	Richard Arias	Ecuador	9:31.51	SB
5	Jhon Vargas	Colombia	9:38.76	
6	Mariano Mastromarino	Argentina	9:44.62	
7	José Peña	Venezuela	9:50.14	
	Alexis López (athlete)	Colombia	DNF	
	Celso Ficagna	Brazil	DNF	
	Nelsón Pedraza*	Colombia	DNS	

=== 4 x 100 meters relay ===
September 30

Rank	Nation	Competitors	Time	Notes
1st place, gold medalist(s)	Brazil	Eliezer de Almeida, Basílio de Moraes Júnior, Vicente de Lima, José Carlos Moreira	39.03	
2nd place, silver medalist(s)	Colombia	Harlin Echevarría, Eduard Mena, Álvaro Gómez, Paulo Villar	40.17	
3rd place, bronze medalist(s)	Argentina	José Manuel Garaventa, Gustavo Aguirre, Iván Altamirano, Mariano Jiménez	40.47	
4	Ecuador	Luis Morán, Franklin Nazareno, Hugo Chila, Juan Venegas	40.56	

=== 4 x 400 meters relay ===
October 1

Rank	Nation	Competitors	Time	Notes
1st place, gold medalist(s)	Brazil	Fernando de Almeida, Sanderlei Parrela, Eduardo Vasconcelos, Raphael Fernandes	3:03.05	
2nd place, silver medalist(s)	Colombia	Geiner Mosquera, Amílcar Torres, Javier Mosquera, Juan Pablo Maturana	3:06.49	
3rd place, bronze medalist(s)	Venezuela	Josner Rodríguez, José Céspedes, Víctor Solarte, Roberto Lineros	3:10.43	
4	Argentina	Iván Altamirano, Mariano Jiménez, Gustavo Aguirre, Christian Deymonnaz	3:12.34	
5	Ecuador	Franklin Nazareno, Luis Gárate, Roberto Zabala, Jhon Tamayo	3:13.76	

=== 20,000 meters walk ===
September 30

Rank	Name	Nationality	Time	Notes
1st place, gold medalist(s)	Gustavo Restrepo	Colombia	1:28:12.0	SB
2nd place, silver medalist(s)	Xavier Moreno	Ecuador	1:29:50.2	PB
3rd place, bronze medalist(s)	Patricio Ortega	Ecuador	1:35:29.1	PB
4	Rafael Duarte	Brazil	1:40:12.6	SB
	James Rendón	Colombia	DQ	

=== High jump ===
September 30

Rank	Name	Nationality	1.95	2.00	2.05	2.10	2.13	2.16	2.20	2.25	2.28	2.31	Result	Notes
1st place, gold medalist(s)	Jessé de Lima	Brazil	–	–	–	o	–	o	o	o	xxo	xxx	2.28	
2nd place, silver medalist(s)	Gilmar Mayo	Colombia	–	–	–	xo	o	o	o	xxx			2.20	
3rd place, bronze medalist(s)	Fábio Baptista	Brazil	–	–	o	o	o	xxx					2.13	
3rd place, bronze medalist(s)	Santiago Guerci	Argentina	–	–	o	o	o	xxx					2.13	
5	Wanner Miller	Colombia	–	–	xo	o	xxx						2.10	
6	Francisco Castro	Chile	o	o	xxx								2.00	

=== Pole vault ===
September 29

Rank	Name	Nationality	4.30	4.50	4.60	4.70	4.80	5.00	5.10	5.15	5.20	5.25	5.35	5.40	5.45	5.55	Result	Notes
1st place, gold medalist(s)	Germán Chiaraviglio	Argentina	–	–	–	–	–	–	–	–	xo	–	–	xxo	–	xxx	5.40	
2nd place, silver medalist(s)	Javier Benítez	Argentina	–	–	–	–	xo	o	o	–	xxo	–	xxo	–	xxx		5.35	SB
3rd place, bronze medalist(s)	Fábio Gomes da Silva	Brazil	–	–	–	–	–	–	–	–	–	xo	–	xxx			5.20	
4	José Francisco Nava	Chile	–	–	–	–	o	o	–	xxo	–	xxx					5.15	
5	Henrique Martins	Brazil	–	–	–	–	o	o	x–	xx							5.00	
6	Víctor Medina	Colombia	–	–	o	xxx											4.60	PB
7	David Alberto Rojas	Colombia	–	xxo	xxx												4.50	
	Lenin Zambrano	Ecuador	xxx														NM	

=== Long jump ===
October 1

Rank	Name	Nationality	#1	#2	#3	#4	#5	#6	Result	Notes
1st place, gold medalist(s)	Rogério Bispo	Brazil	x	8.12	x	x	8.32w	7.30	8.32w	
2nd place, silver medalist(s)	Louis Tristán	Peru	8.09	–	x	x	–	x	8.09	NR
3rd place, bronze medalist(s)	Rodrigo de Araújo	Brazil	x	7.97w	8.05	7.90w	x	8.05	8.05	SB
4	Hugo Chila	Ecuador	x	7.84w	7.70	x	x	x	7.84w	
5	Carlos Jaramillo	Ecuador	7.40w	x	7.57w	7.03	7.18	7.59	7.59	SB
6	Dainner Griego	Colombia	7.45	7.54w	7.45	7.54w	7.54	7.35w	7.54	SB
6	Jhon Murillo	Colombia	x	6.93w	6.91w	6.88w	6.88	–	6.93	
	Thiago Dias*	Brazil	7.70w	7.79w	x	7.61	x	7.62	7.79w	

=== Triple jump ===
September 30

Rank	Name	Nationality	#1	#2	#3	#4	#5	#6	Result	Notes
1st place, gold medalist(s)	Hugo Chila	Ecuador	16.41w	16.36w	x	16.01w	16.60w	16.68w	16.68w	
2nd place, silver medalist(s)	Thiago Dias	Brazil	15.82w	15.84w	16.12w	13.39w	16.52w	16.57w	16.57w	
3rd place, bronze medalist(s)	Jhon Murillo	Colombia	15.48w	15.67	15.52w	15.72w	15.85w	16.33w	16.33w	
4	Adalberto Mulato	Colombia	15.34w	x	15.53w	15.40w	15.20w	15.43	15.53w	
5	Jefferson Sabino	Brazil	x	x	x	15.45w	x	x	15.45w	
	Gustavo Ochoa	Argentina	x	x	x	x	x	x	NM	

=== Shot put ===
October 1

Rank	Name	Nationality	#1	#2	#3	#4	#5	#6	Result	Notes
1st place, gold medalist(s)	Germán Lauro	Argentina	x	18.69	x	x	18.97	x	18.97	PB
2nd place, silver medalist(s)	Marco Antonio Verni	Chile	17.89	18.42	x	18.62	18.23	18.51	18.62	
3rd place, bronze medalist(s)	Marcelo Moreira	Brazil	17.21	17.84	17.40	17.25	17.50	17.73	17.84	PB
4	Jiovanny García	Colombia	17.39	17.82	17.83	17.58	17.79	17.71	17.83	
5	Gonzalo Riffo	Chile	17.08	x	x	16.71	x	x	17.08	
6	Aldo González	Bolivia	16.45	x	16.37	16.80	x	16.26	16.80	NR
7	Gustavo Mendonça	Brazil	15.95	15.78	16.88	16.48	16.46	16.72	16.72	
8	Julio César Londoño	Colombia	14.89	15.66	15.42	15.37	x	–	15.66	PB
	Ronald Julião*	Brazil	15.95	15.49	15.90				15.95	

=== Discus throw ===
September 29

Rank	Name	Nationality	#1	#2	#3	#4	#5	#6	Result	Notes
1st place, gold medalist(s)	Jorge Balliengo	Argentina	x	52.21	55.76	60.19	x	58.37	60.19	
2nd place, silver medalist(s)	Ronald Julião	Brazil	55.64	54.57	56.83	x	57.02	56.56	57.02	
3rd place, bronze medalist(s)	Gustavo Mendonça	Brazil	50.16	47.21	46.77	48.58	51.15	49.99	51.15	
4	Julio César Londoño	Colombia	x	44.30	45.48	x	48.15	x	48.15	
5	Gonzalo Riffo	Chile	42.64	44.50	45.88	41.34	41.94	x	45.88	
6	Leonardo Pino	Chile	x	x	40.53	x	x	x	40.53	
	Germán Lauro	Argentina	x	x	x	x	x	x	NM	

=== Hammer throw ===
September 29

Rank	Name	Nationality	#1	#2	#3	#4	#5	#6	Result	Notes
1st place, gold medalist(s)	Juan Ignacio Cerra	Argentina	68.02	70.96	x	71.11	69.80	71.20	71.20	
2nd place, silver medalist(s)	Patricio Palma	Chile	x	67.30	x	x	x	65.87	67.30	
3rd place, bronze medalist(s)	Wagner Domingos	Brazil	x	65.23	64.02	x	x	67.27	67.27	
4	Adrián Marzo	Argentina	64.73	x	x	x	x	64.90	64.90	
5	Leonardo Pino	Chile	x	62.42	62.48	63.27	63.18	x	63.27	
6	Mário Leme	Brazil	59.50	60.25	x	61.08	60.52	61.35	61.35	
7	Jacobo D'León	Colombia	x	x	59.88	59.79	x	x	59.88	
8	Freimar Arias	Colombia	x	x	x	x	58.23	x	58.23	

=== Javelin throw ===
October 1

Rank	Name	Nationality	#1	#2	#3	#4	#5	#6	Result	Notes
1st place, gold medalist(s)	Noraldo Palacios	Colombia	72.81	72.32	73.83	x	x	79.09	79.09	NR
2nd place, silver medalist(s)	Víctor Fatecha	Paraguay	76.41	76.79	x	x	72.90	73.18	76.79	NJR
3rd place, bronze medalist(s)	João Carlos Martins	Brazil	x	x	60.56	75.26	x	x	75.26	
4	Pablo Pietrobelli	Argentina	70.61	75.06	69.89	69.44	73.20	70.96	75.06	
5	Luiz Fernando da Silva	Brazil	73.24	73.17	72.40	72.36	70.30	73.94	73.94	
6	Dayron Márquez	Colombia	x	68.40	x	69.93	x	x	69.93	
7	Ignacio Guerra	Chile	x	64.38	x	x	x	x	64.38	
	Orielso Cabrera*	Colombia	69.36	69.12	63.34				69.36	
	Arley Ibargüen*	Colombia	x	68.70	67.17				68.70	
	Jhonny Viáfara*	Colombia	x	x	65.73				65.73	

=== Decathlon ===
September 29–30

The highest mark recorded in each event is highlighted in yellow

Rank	Athlete	Nationality	100m	LJ	SP	HJ	400m	110m H	DT	PV	JT	1500m	Points	Notes
1st place, gold medalist(s)	Carlos Chinin	Brazil	11.35	7.29	13.76	1.86	49.60	15.18	37.98	3.80	54.68	4:45.99	7208	
2nd place, silver medalist(s)	Erik Kerwitz	Argentina	10.97	7.48	12.50	1.92	51.45	15.16	36.30	3.80	60.98	5:03.64	7188	
3rd place, bronze medalist(s)	Enrique Aguirre	Argentina	11.43	6.83	13.68	2.01	52.35	15.55	37.52	4.00	52.19	5:57.36	6683	
4	Jorge Naranjo	Chile	11.55	7.27	13.73	2.01	52.50	15.64	33.41	NM	38.72	5:41.40	5923	
	Jefferson Mosquera	Colombia	11.78	6.95	13.87	NM	DNS	–	–	DNS	–	–	DNF	
	Luiz Alberto de Araújo	Brazil	11.36	6.89	13.15	DNS	–	–	–	DNS	–	–	DNF	
	Andres Mantilla	Colombia	11.56	6.48	13.68	DNS	–	–	–	DNS	–	–	DNF	

== Women's results ==
=== 100 meters ===
September 29
Wind: -2.1 m/s

Rank	Name	Nationality	Time	Notes
1st place, gold medalist(s)	Rosemar Coelho Neto	Brazil	11.53	
2nd place, silver medalist(s)	Yomara Hinestroza	Colombia	11.72	SB
3rd place, bronze medalist(s)	Darlenys Obregón	Colombia	11.72	SB
4	Lucimar de Moura	Brazil	11.75	
5	Vanesa Wohlgemuth	Argentina	12.17	SB
6	Erika Chávez	Ecuador	12.28	PB
7	Maitté Zamorano	Bolivia	12.37	
8	Paula Aquino	Argentina	12.65	

=== 200 meters ===
September 30
Wind: -2.5 m/s

Rank	Name	Nationality	Time	Notes
1st place, gold medalist(s)	Rosemar Coelho Neto	Brazil	23.44	
2nd place, silver medalist(s)	Darlenys Obregón	Colombia	23.58	
3rd place, bronze medalist(s)	Vanda Gomes	Brazil	23.76	
4	Yomara Hinestroza	Colombia	24.28	
5	Erika Chávez	Ecuador	24.81	
6	Vanesa Wohlgemuth	Argentina	25.43	
7	Paula Aquino	Argentina	26.10	

=== 400 meters ===
September 29

Rank	Name	Nationality	Time	Notes
1st place, gold medalist(s)	Lucimar Teodoro	Brazil	53.31	
2nd place, silver medalist(s)	Perla Regina dos Santos	Brazil	53.82	
3rd place, bronze medalist(s)	María Alejandra Idrobo	Colombia	53.94	
4	Lucy Jaramillo	Ecuador	53.95	
5	Shirley Aragon	Colombia	55.67	
6	Erika Chávez	Ecuador	59.15	
	Sheila Ferreira*	Brazil	54.06	
	Kelly López*	Colombia	56.25	

=== 800 meters ===
October 1

Rank	Name	Nationality	Time	Notes
1st place, gold medalist(s)	Christiane Ritz	Brazil	2:10.15	
2nd place, silver medalist(s)	Muriel Coneo	Colombia	2:14.13	
3rd place, bronze medalist(s)	Diana Armas	Ecuador	2:18.67	SB
4	Andrea Ferris	Panama	2:27.49	PB

=== 1500 meters ===
September 30

Rank	Name	Nationality	Time	Notes
1st place, gold medalist(s)	Juliana Paula dos Santos	Brazil	4:33.74	
2nd place, silver medalist(s)	Ana Joaquina Rondón	Colombia	4:37.03	
3rd place, bronze medalist(s)	Muriel Coneo	Colombia	4:55.24	
	Andrea Ferris	Panama	DNF	

=== 5000 meters ===
October 1

Rank	Name	Nationality	Time	Notes
1st place, gold medalist(s)	Bertha Sánchez	Colombia	17:16.39	
2nd place, silver medalist(s)	Ana Joaquina Rondón	Colombia	17:17.11	
3rd place, bronze medalist(s)	Rosa Apaza	Bolivia	17:18.31	SB
4	Fabiana Cristine da Silva	Brazil	17:44.97	
5	Paola Álvaro	Ecuador	18:45.42	PB
	Johana Riveros*	Colombia	18:24.36	

=== 10,000 meters ===
September 29

Rank	Name	Nationality	Time	Notes
1st place, gold medalist(s)	Bertha Sánchez	Colombia	37:36.16	
2nd place, silver medalist(s)	Ednalva da Silva	Brazil	37:37.47	
3rd place, bronze medalist(s)	Rosa Apaza	Bolivia	37:38.12	PB
4	Lina Arias	Colombia	37:57.29	
	Johana Riveros*	Colombia	38:16.16	PB

=== 100 meters hurdles ===
September 29
Wind: -2.9 m/s

Rank	Name	Nationality	Time	Notes
1st place, gold medalist(s)	Maíla Machado	Brazil	13.28	
2nd place, silver medalist(s)	Francisca Guzmán	Chile	13.83	
3rd place, bronze medalist(s)	Gilvaneide Parrela	Brazil	14.06	
4	Brigitte Merlano	Colombia	14.10	
5	Solange Witteveen	Argentina	14.79	
6	Eliecith Palacios	Colombia	15.04	
7	Daiana Sturtz	Argentina	15.21	PB
8	Victoria Quiñonez	Ecuador	15.42	PB

=== 400 meters hurdles ===
September 30

Rank	Name	Nationality	Time	Notes
1st place, gold medalist(s)	Lucimar Teodoro	Brazil	58.16	
2nd place, silver medalist(s)	Perla dos Santos	Brazil	58.40	
3rd place, bronze medalist(s)	Lucy Jaramillo	Ecuador	58.93	SB
4	Karina Caicedo	Ecuador	1:02.51	PB
5	Princesa Oliveros	Colombia	1:10.02	

=== 3000 meters steeplechase ===
September 30

Rank	Name	Nationality	Time	Notes
1st place, gold medalist(s)	Bertha Sánchez	Colombia	10:48.44	
2nd place, silver medalist(s)	Zenaide Vieira	Brazil	10:56.16	
3rd place, bronze medalist(s)	Michelle da Costa	Brazil	11:34.53	
4	Silvia Paredes	Ecuador	12:01.46	SB

=== 4 x 100 meters relay ===
September 29

Rank	Nation	Competitors	Time	Notes
1st place, gold medalist(s)	Brazil	Maíla Machado, Lucimar de Moura, Rosemar Coelho Neto, Vanda Gomes	44.72	
2nd place, silver medalist(s)	Colombia	Shirley Aragón, María Alejandra Idrobo, Darlenys Obregón, Yomara Hinestroza	44.78	
3rd place, bronze medalist(s)	Ecuador	Erika Chávez, Lucy Jaramillo, Mayra Pachito, Victoria Quiñonez	47.47	
4	Argentina	Vanesa Wohlgemuth, Andrea Bordalejo, Daniela Crespo, Paula Aquino	47.55	

=== 4 x 400 meters relay ===
October 1

Rank	Nation	Competitors	Time	Notes
1st place, gold medalist(s)	Brazil	Lucimar Teodoro, Perla Regina dos Santos, Sheila Ferreira, Juliana de Azevedo	3:32.56	
2nd place, silver medalist(s)	Colombia	Muriel Coneo, Princesa Oliveros, Shirley Aragón, María Alejandra Idrobo	3:37.12	
3rd place, bronze medalist(s)	Ecuador	Erika Chávez, Lucy Jaramillo, Diana Armas, Karina Caicedo	3:47.58	
4	Argentina	Vanesa Wohlgemuth, Solange Witteveen, Andrea Bordalejo, Daniela Crespo	4:00.98	

=== 20,000 meters walk ===
October 1

Rank	Name	Nationality	Time	Notes
1st place, gold medalist(s)	Yadira Guamán	Ecuador	1:46:06.7	
2nd place, silver medalist(s)	Luz Villamarín	Colombia	1:46:40.3	PB
3rd place, bronze medalist(s)	Magaly Andrade	Ecuador	1:46:40.4	PB
4	Cristina Bohórquez	Colombia	1:50:37.4	SB
5	Marcela Pacheco	Chile	1:51:00.9	SB
6	Elianay Pereira	Brazil	2:01:42.9	
	Josette Sepúlveda	Chile	DQ	
	Cisiane Lopes	Brazil	DQ	

=== High jump ===
October 1

Rank	Name	Nationality	1.65	1.70	1.73	1.76	1.79	1.82	1.85	1.90	1.93	Result	Notes
1st place, gold medalist(s)	Caterine Ibargüen	Colombia	–	–	o	–	o	xo	o	xo	xxx	1.90	SB
2nd place, silver medalist(s)	Solange Witteveen	Argentina	–	–	o	o	xo	o	xxx			1.82	
3rd place, bronze medalist(s)	Eliana Renata da Silva	Brazil	–	o	o	o	x–	xo	xxx			1.82	SB
4	Daiana Sturtz	Argentina	–	o	o	o	o	xxx				1.79	PB
5	Mônica de Freitas	Brazil	o	o	xxo	o	o	xxx				1.79	SB

=== Pole vault ===
September 29

Rank	Name	Nationality	3.00	3.10	3.20	3.30	3.40	3.50	3.60	3.80	3.90	4.00	4.10	4.20	4.25	4.35	4.47	4.57	Result	Notes
1st place, gold medalist(s)	Fabiana Murer	Brazil	–	–	–	–	–	–	–	–	–	–	–	–	xo	o	xxo	xxx	4.47	
2nd place, silver medalist(s)	Carolina Torres	Chile	–	–	–	–	–	–	–	–	o	–	o	o	o	xxx			4.25	SB
3rd place, bronze medalist(s)	Alejandra García	Argentina	–	–	–	–	–	–	–	–	–	–	o	xxx					4.00	
4	Joana Costa	Brazil	–	–	–	–	–	–	–	–	o	o	xxx						3.90	
5	Milena Agudelo	Colombia	–	–	–	–	–	–	–	–	xxo	xxo	xxx						3.90	
6	Karina Quejada	Colombia	–	–	o	o	o	o	o	xxx									3.50	SB
7	Lorena Ortiz	Ecuador	xxo	o	xxx														3.10	SB
	Déborah Gyurcsek	Uruguay	–	–	–	–	–	–	xxx										NM	

=== Long jump ===
September 30

Rank	Name	Nationality	#1	#2	#3	#4	#5	#6	Result	Notes
1st place, gold medalist(s)	Maurren Maggi	Brazil	x	6.86w	x	x	6.68	x	6.86w	
2nd place, silver medalist(s)	Caterine Ibargüen	Colombia	6.21w	x	6.23	x	6.51	–	6.51w	
3rd place, bronze medalist(s)	Fernanda Gonçalves	Brazil	6.36w	x	x	6.19w	x	6.35w	6.36w	
4	Elena Guerrero	Colombia	6.12w	6.06	x	5.95w	x	6.14w	6.14w	
5	Maitté Zamorano	Bolivia	x	5.69w	6.00	5.62w	5.80	x	6.00	

=== Triple jump ===
September 29

Rank	Name	Nationality	#1	#2	#3	#4	#5	#6	Result	Notes
1st place, gold medalist(s)	Tânia da Silva	Brazil	13.88	13.92	13.83	13.77	–	x	13.92	
2nd place, silver medalist(s)	Caterine Ibargüen	Colombia	13.54	13.91	13.33	–	13.62	13.78	13.91	NR
3rd place, bronze medalist(s)	Fabricia da Silva	Brazil	13.21	13.39	13.09	13.17	–	13.14	13.39	
4	Jazmín Córdoba	Colombia	12.66	x	12.77	12.40	x	x	12.77	
5	Mayra Pachito	Ecuador	x	12.43	12.30	12.50	12.03	12.59	12.59	

=== Shot put ===
September 30

Rank	Name	Nationality	#1	#2	#3	#4	#5	#6	Result	Notes
1st place, gold medalist(s)	Elisângela Adriano	Brazil	15.52	15.92	17.37	17.20	17.11	17.25	17.37	SB
2nd place, silver medalist(s)	Andréa Pereira	Brazil	15.19	15.90	15.90	15.50	16.18	16.27	16.27	
3rd place, bronze medalist(s)	Luz Dary Castro	Colombia	14.52	15.70	16.26	x	15.12	15.44	16.26	
4	Johana Moreno	Colombia	13.35	14.16	14.17	14.11	13.68	x	14.17	
5	Rocío Comba	Argentina	13.42	–	–	–	–	–	13.42	
6	Ximena Araneda	Chile	x	12.97	12.37	12.90	12.35	12.63	12.97	PB
7	Karen Gallardo	Chile	x	11.27	12.01	11.24	11.64	11.35	12.01	PB

=== Discus throw ===
September 30

Rank	Name	Nationality	#1	#2	#3	#4	#5	#6	Result	Notes
1st place, gold medalist(s)	Elisângela Adriano	Brazil	50.31	54.99	55.30	55.82	56.18	52.92	56.18	
2nd place, silver medalist(s)	Luz Dary Castro	Colombia	47.33	48.88	x	x	44.27	47.44	48.88	
3rd place, bronze medalist(s)	Karen Gallardo	Chile	x	43.40	45.72	47.69	48.75	45.54	48.88	
4	Renata de Figueirêdo	Brazil	43.95	45.89	45.25	43.67	45.58	48.64	48.64	
5	Rocío Comba	Argentina	47.34	40.27	39.84	46.84	44.34	45.86	47.34	
6	Ximena Araneda	Chile	x	41.68	x	x	46.00	x	46.00	
7	Johana Moreno	Colombia	38.16	39.17	41.39	x	x	40.99	41.39	
8	Miriam Mina	Ecuador	35.99	35.50	36.24	–	–	–	36.24	

=== Hammer throw ===
September 29

Rank	Name	Nationality	#1	#2	#3	#4	#5	#6	Result	Notes
1st place, gold medalist(s)	Jennifer Dahlgren	Argentina	x	63.90	69.07	64.63	66.82	x	69.07	CR
2nd place, silver medalist(s)	Johana Moreno	Colombia	x	x	x	61.13	64.94	x	64.94	
3rd place, bronze medalist(s)	Katiuscia de Jesus	Brazil	x	62.26	x	62.36	62.97	64.58	64.58	NR
4	Josiane Soares	Brazil	x	61.94	63.86	x	61.51	59.92	63.86	
5	Johana Ramírez	Colombia	x	x	x	x	62.05	60.32	62.05	
6	Odette Palma	Chile	x	x	52.76	49.32	51.67	57.41	57.41	
7	Stefanía Zoryez	Uruguay	x	x	x	56.67	x	–	56.67	
8	Erika Melián	Argentina	56.56	x	x	x	x	x	56.56	

=== Javelin throw ===
September 30

Rank	Name	Nationality	#1	#2	#3	#4	#5	#6	Result	Notes
1st place, gold medalist(s)	Alessandra Resende	Brazil	x	58.11	55.97	56.55	56.49	x	58.11	
2nd place, silver medalist(s)	Zuleima Araméndiz	Colombia	54.68	55.19	55.20	x	53.17	55.60	55.60	
3rd place, bronze medalist(s)	Sabina Moya	Colombia	51.16	51.52	54.22	50.58	54.52	52.22	54.52	
4	Romina Maggi	Argentina	x	46.94	x	49.46	48.02	48.25	49.46	
5	Yusbelys Parra	Venezuela	x	x	x	42.07	49.04	47.06	49.04	
6	Silvia de Oliveira	Brazil	46.11	48.29	47.73	45.34	48.67	48.17	48.67	
7	Miriam Mina	Ecuador	38.88	41.28	44.33	41.14	40.80	42.52	44.33	
	Diana Rivas*	Colombia	x	43.91	44.64	46.58	46.18	x	46.58	

=== Heptathlon ===
September 29–30

The highest mark recorded in each event is highlighted in yellow

Rank	Athlete	Nationality	100m H	HJ	SP	200m	LJ	JT	800m	Points	Notes
1st place, gold medalist(s)	Elizete da Silva	Brazil	14.69	1.63	12.84	25.51	6.07	44.76	2:23.58	5612	
2nd place, silver medalist(s)	Jailma de Lima	Brazil	14.90	1.75	10.98	24.63	6.06	40.31	2:44.60	5348	
3rd place, bronze medalist(s)	Andrea Bordalejo	Argentina	14.79	1.60	11.32	26.67	5.94	32.42	2:29.51	5348	
4	Daniela Crespo	Argentina	15.62	1.72	9.16	25.90	5.60	29.75	2:19.29	4947	
5	Nasli Perea	Colombia	15.26	1.63	11.26	27.63	5.35	43.15	2:50.42	4694	
6	Victoria Quiñonez	Ecuador	15.47	1.60	10.69	26.03	6.08	29.04	2:40.41	4890	
