= 2008 Ibero-American Championships in Athletics – Results =

These are the official results of the 2008 Ibero-American Championships in Athletics which took place on June 13–15, 2008 in Iquique, Chile.

== Men's results ==
=== 100 meters ===
Heats – June 13
Wind:
Heat 1: -1.6 m/s, Heat 2: -1.1 m/s

| Rank | Heat | Name | Nationality | Time | Notes |
|---|---|---|---|---|---|
| 1 | 2 | Henry Vizcaíno | Cuba | 10.44 | Q |
| 2 | 2 | Franklin Nazareno | Ecuador | 10.55 | Q |
| 3 | 2 | José Carlos Moreira | Brazil | 10.56 | Q |
| 4 | 2 | Rolando Palacios | Honduras | 10.57 | q |
| 5 | 1 | Kael Becerra | Chile | 10.71 | Q |
| 6 | 1 | Sandro Viana | Brazil | 10.71 | Q |
| 7 | 1 | Jermaine Chirinos | Venezuela | 10.82 | Q |
| 8 | 1 | Heber Viera | Uruguay | 10.83 | q |
| 9 | 1 | Matías Usandivaras | Argentina | 10.88 | |
| 9 | 2 | Álvaro Cassiani | Venezuela | 10.88 | |
| 9 | 2 | José Manuel Garaventa | Argentina | 10.88 | |
| 12 | 2 | Ignacio Rojas | Chile | 10.96 | |
| 13 | 1 | Jean Carlos Peguero | Dominican Republic | 10.97 | |
| 14 | 1 | Fernando Covarrubias | Bolivia | 11.57 | |

Final – June 13
Wind:
-2.3 m/s

| Rank | Lane | Name | Nationality | Time | Notes |
|---|---|---|---|---|---|
| 1st place, gold medalist(s) | 7 | José Carlos Moreira | Brazil | 10.54 | |
| 2nd place, silver medalist(s) | 6 | Franklin Nazareno | Ecuador | 10.60 | |
| 3rd place, bronze medalist(s) | 5 | Kael Becerra | Chile | 10.62 | |
| 4 | 8 | Rolando Palacios | Honduras | 10.63 | |
| 5 | 4 | Henry Vizcaíno | Cuba | 10.70 | |
| 6 | 2 | Jermaine Chirinos | Venezuela | 10.79 | |
| 7 | 1 | Heber Viera | Uruguay | 10.94 | |
| | 3 | Sandro Viana | Brazil | DQ | FS |

=== 200 meters ===
Heats – June 15
Wind:
Heat 1: -0.5 m/s, Heat 2: -1.7 m/s

| Rank | Heat | Name | Nationality | Time | Notes |
|---|---|---|---|---|---|
| 1 | 1 | Sandro Viana | Brazil | 21.08 | Q |
| 2 | 1 | Cristián Reyes | Chile | 21.08 | Q |
| 3 | 2 | Bruno de Barros | Brazil | 21.10 | Q |
| 4 | 1 | Rolando Palacios | Honduras | 21.30 | Q |
| 5 | 2 | Franklin Nazareno | Ecuador | 21.34 | Q |
| 6 | 2 | Mariano Jiménez | Argentina | 21.36 | Q |
| 7 | 1 | Jermaine Chirinos | Venezuela | 21.49 | q |
| 8 | 2 | Ronald Amaya | Venezuela | 21.61 | q |
| 9 | 1 | Joel Hernández | Dominican Republic | 21.72 | |
| 10 | 2 | Kael Becerra | Chile | 21.73 | |
| 11 | 1 | Heber Viera | Uruguay | 21.74 | |
| 12 | 2 | Gustavo Cuesta | Dominican Republic | 22.05 | |
| | 1 | Henry Vizcaíno | Cuba | DNS | |

Final – June 15

| Rank | Lane | Name | Nationality | Time | Notes |
|---|---|---|---|---|---|
| 1st place, gold medalist(s) | 4 | Sandro Viana | Brazil | 20.87 | |
| 2nd place, silver medalist(s) | 3 | Bruno de Barros | Brazil | 20.95 | |
| 3rd place, bronze medalist(s) | 5 | Cristián Reyes | Chile | 21.14 | |
| 4 | 6 | Rolando Palacios | Honduras | 21.16 | |
| 5 | 2 | Jermaine Chirinos | Venezuela | 21.41 | |
| 6 | 7 | Franklin Nazareno | Ecuador | 21.43 | |
| 7 | 8 | Mariano Jiménez | Argentina | 21.55 | |
| 8 | 1 | Ronald Amaya | Venezuela | 21.62 | |

=== 400 meters ===
Heats – June 13

| Rank | Heat | Name | Nationality | Time | Notes |
|---|---|---|---|---|---|
| 1 | 1 | Fernando de Almeida | Brazil | 46.68 | Q |
| 2 | 1 | Geiner Mosquera | Colombia | 46.75 | Q |
| 3 | 1 | Luis Luna | Venezuela | 46.96 | Q |
| 4 | 1 | Kelvin Herrera | Dominican Republic | 47.43 | q |
| 5 | 2 | Freddy Mezones | Venezuela | 47.89 | Q |
| 6 | 2 | Orlando Frías | Dominican Republic | 47.92 | Q |
| 7 | 2 | Héctor Carrasquillo | Puerto Rico | 48.01 | Q |
| 8 | 1 | Javier Vivar | Chile | 48.69 | q |
| 9 | 2 | José Vidal | Chile | 48.85 | |
| 10 | 2 | Jeisson Rivas | Colombia | 48.86 | |
| 11 | 2 | Jonathan Loor | Ecuador | 49.29 | |

Final – June 14

| Rank | Lane | Name | Nationality | Time | Notes |
|---|---|---|---|---|---|
| 1st place, gold medalist(s) | 3 | Geiner Mosquera | Colombia | 46.63 | |
| 2nd place, silver medalist(s) | 4 | Fernando de Almeida | Brazil | 46.73 | |
| 3rd place, bronze medalist(s) | 2 | Héctor Carrasquillo | Puerto Rico | 46.92 | |
| 4 | 8 | Kelvin Herrera | Dominican Republic | 47.88 | |
| 5 | 5 | Freddy Mezones | Venezuela | 47.93 | |
| 6 | 6 | Orlando Frías | Dominican Republic | 48.03 | |
| 7 | 1 | Javier Vivar | Chile | 48.85 | |
| | 7 | Luis Luna | Venezuela | DQ | |

=== 800 meters ===
Heats – June 13

| Rank | Heat | Name | Nationality | Time | Notes |
|---|---|---|---|---|---|
| 1 | 1 | Fabiano Peçanha | Brazil | 1:50.02 | Q |
| 2 | 1 | Salvador Crespo | Spain | 1:50.07 | Q |
| 3 | 1 | Leonardo Price | Argentina | 1:50.63 | Q |
| 4 | 2 | Víctor Riobó | Spain | 1:50.65 | Q |
| 5 | 2 | Andy González | Cuba | 1:50.66 | Q |
| 6 | 2 | Diomar Noêmio | Brazil | 1:50.66 | Q |
| 7 | 2 | Tayron Reyes | Dominican Republic | 1:50.73 | q |
| 8 | 1 | Eduar Villanueva | Venezuela | 1:50.97 | q |
| 9 | 1 | Fadrique Iglesias | Bolivia | 1:51.70 | |
| 10 | 1 | Andy Muñoz | Chile | 1:51.84 | |
| 11 | 2 | Gustavo Aguirre | Argentina | 1:53.51 | |
| 12 | 2 | Javier Mariscal | Chile | 1:54.21 | |

Final – June 14

| Rank | Name | Nationality | Time | Notes |
|---|---|---|---|---|
| 1st place, gold medalist(s) | Andy González | Cuba | 1:47.59 | |
| 2nd place, silver medalist(s) | Fabiano Peçanha | Brazil | 1:47.83 | |
| 3rd place, bronze medalist(s) | Salvador Crespo | Spain | 1:48.11 | |
| 4 | Leonardo Price | Argentina | 1:48.38 | |
| 5 | Diomar Noêmio | Brazil | 1:49.39 | |
| 6 | Eduar Villanueva | Venezuela | 1:49.84 | |
| 7 | Víctor Riobó | Spain | 1:49.93 | |
| 8 | Tayron Reyes | Dominican Republic | DQ | |

=== 1500 meters ===
June 15

| Rank | Name | Nationality | Time | Notes |
|---|---|---|---|---|
| 1st place, gold medalist(s) | Fabiano Peçanha | Brazil | 3:42.06 | |
| 2nd place, silver medalist(s) | Byron Piedra | Ecuador | 3:42.65 | |
| 3rd place, bronze medalist(s) | Víctor Montaner | Spain | 3:42.93 | |
| 4 | Isaías Haro | Mexico | 3:42.94 | |
| 5 | Eduar Villanueva | Venezuela | 3:43.59 | |
| 6 | Pedro Esteso | Spain | 3:44.06 | |
| 7 | Nico Herrera | Venezuela | 3:44.66 | |
| 8 | Mario Bazán | Peru | 3:45:69 | |
| 9 | Diego Borrego | Mexico | 3:45.93 | |
| 10 | André de Santana | Brazil | 3:45.94 | |
| 11 | Leonardo Price | Argentina | 3:48.91 | |
| 12 | Enzo Yáñez | Chile | 3:50.72 | |
| 13 | Iván López | Chile | 3:51.68 | |
| 14 | César Fernández | Bolivia | 4:02.76 | |

=== 3000 meters ===
June 14

| Rank | Name | Nationality | Time | Notes |
|---|---|---|---|---|
| 1st place, gold medalist(s) | Byron Piedra | Ecuador | 7:54.69 | NR |
| 2nd place, silver medalist(s) | Isaías Haro | Mexico | 7:54.70 | |
| 3rd place, bronze medalist(s) | Mario Bazán | Peru | 7:57.95 | |
| 4 | Gládson Barbosa | Brazil | 8:02.09 | |
| 5 | Hermano Ferreira | Portugal | 8:05.46 | |
| 6 | Nico Herrera | Venezuela | 8:05.52 | |
| 7 | André de Santana | Brazil | 8:06.73 | |
| 8 | Enzo Yáñez | Chile | 8:07.55 | |
| 9 | Alvaro Jiménez | Spain | 8:13.89 | |
| 10 | José Peña | Venezuela | 8:21.12 | |
| | Mariano Mastromarino | Argentina | DQ | Rule 163.3 |
| | Roberto Echeverría | Chile | DNS | |

=== 5000 meters ===
June 13

| Rank | Name | Nationality | Time | Notes |
|---|---|---|---|---|
| 1st place, gold medalist(s) | Javier Carriqueo | Argentina | 13:51.14 | |
| 2nd place, silver medalist(s) | Alejandro Suárez | Mexico | 13:51.20 | |
| 3rd place, bronze medalist(s) | Juan Carlos Romero | Mexico | 13:51.25 | |
| 4 | Antonio Núñez | Spain | 13:51.71 | |
| 5 | Javier Guerra | Spain | 13:52.74 | |
| 6 | Ubiratan Santos | Brazil | 14:03.93 | |
| 7 | Hermano Ferreira | Portugal | 14:06.21 | |
| 8 | Roberto Echeverría | Chile | 14:23.16 | |
| 9 | Cesar Fernández | Bolivia | 14:43.23 | |
| | Javier Guarín | Colombia | DNS | |

=== 110 meters hurdles ===
Heats – June 15
Wind:
Heat 1: -1.3 m/s, Heat 2: -1.1 m/s

| Rank | Heat | Name | Nationality | Time | Notes |
|---|---|---|---|---|---|
| 1 | 2 | Paulo Villar | Colombia | 13.87 | Q |
| 2 | 1 | Enrique Llanos | Puerto Rico | 13.93 | Q |
| 3 | 1 | Éder Antônio Souza | Brazil | 14.30 | Q |
| 4 | 1 | Francisco Castro | Chile | 14.45 | Q |
| 5 | 1 | Christian de la Calle | Spain | 14.46 | q |
| 6 | 2 | Jorge McFarlane | Peru | 14.63 | Q |
| 7 | 1 | John Tamayo | Ecuador | 14.64 | q |
| 8 | 1 | Ronald Benneth | Honduras | 14.87 | |
| 9 | 2 | Leandro Peyrano | Argentina | 14.88 | Q |
| 10 | 2 | Oscar Buttazzoni | Chile | 15.42 | |
| | 2 | Anselmo Gomes da Silva | Brazil | DQ | FS |

Final – June 15
Wind:
-2.0 m/s

| Rank | Lane | Name | Nationality | Time | Notes |
|---|---|---|---|---|---|
| 1st place, gold medalist(s) | 4 | Paulo Villar | Colombia | 13.74 | |
| 2nd place, silver medalist(s) | 5 | Enrique Llanos | Puerto Rico | 13.89 | |
| 3rd place, bronze medalist(s) | 3 | Éder Antônio Souza | Brazil | 14.10 | |
| 4 | 6 | Francisco Castro | Chile | 14.37 | |
| 5 | 8 | Jorge McFarlane | Peru | 14.40 | |
| 6 | 7 | Christian de la Calle | Spain | 14.42 | |
| 7 | 1 | Leandro Peyrano | Argentina | 14.66 | |
| | 2 | John Tamayo | Ecuador | DNS | |

=== 400 meters hurdles ===
Heats – June 13

| Rank | Heat | Name | Nationality | Time | Notes |
|---|---|---|---|---|---|
| 1 | 2 | Tiago Bueno | Brazil | 51.54 | Q |
| 2 | 2 | Jeisson Rivas | Colombia | 51.96 | Q |
| 3 | 1 | Mahau Suguimati | Brazil | 51.97 | Q |
| 4 | 2 | Luis Montenegro | Chile | 51.98 | Q |
| 5 | 2 | Allan Ayala | Guatemala | 52.01 | q |
| 6 | 1 | Diego Cabello | Spain | 52.06 | Q |
| 7 | 1 | Víctor Solarte | Venezuela | 52.35 | Q |
| 8 | 2 | John Tamayo | Ecuador | 52.51 | q |
| 9 | 1 | José Ignacio Pignataro | Argentina | 52.54 | |
| 10 | 1 | Gustavo Gutiérrez | Chile | 52.56 | |
| 11 | 2 | Juan Carlos Moreno | Spain | 52.89 | |

Final – June 14

| Rank | Lane | Name | Nationality | Time | Notes |
|---|---|---|---|---|---|
| 1st place, gold medalist(s) | 5 | Mahau Suguimati | Brazil | 50.07 | |
| 2nd place, silver medalist(s) | 3 | Jeisson Rivas | Colombia | 50.92 | |
| 3rd place, bronze medalist(s) | 4 | Tiago Bueno | Brazil | 51.20 | |
| 4 | 8 | Allan Ayala | Guatemala | 51.41 | |
| 5 | 2 | Víctor Solarte | Venezuela | 51.66 | |
| 6 | 7 | Luis Montenegro | Chile | 51.70 | |
| 7 | 6 | Diego Cabello | Spain | 52.26 | |
| 8 | 1 | John Tamayo | Ecuador | 52.68 | |

=== 3000 meters steeplechase ===
June 13

| Rank | Name | Nationality | Time | Notes |
|---|---|---|---|---|
| 1st place, gold medalist(s) | Mario Bazán | Peru | 8:42.51 | |
| 2nd place, silver medalist(s) | Francisco Lara | Spain | 8:43.57 | |
| 3rd place, bronze medalist(s) | Gládson Barbosa | Brazil | 8:44.93 | |
| 4 | Ángel Mullera | Spain | 8:46.07 | |
| 5 | José Peña | Venezuela | 8:54.80 | |
| 6 | Mariano Mastromarino | Argentina | 8:59.26 | |
| 7 | Sergio Lobos | Chile | 9:08.18 | |
| | Marvin Blanco | Venezuela | DQ | |

=== 4 x 100 meters relay ===
June 15

| Rank | Nation | Competitors | Time | Notes |
|---|---|---|---|---|
| 1st place, gold medalist(s) | Brazil | Vicente de Lima, Sandro Viana, Bruno de Barros, José Carlos Moreira | 38.96 | |
| 2nd place, silver medalist(s) | Argentina | José Manuel Garaventa, Mariano Jiménez, Miguel Wilken, Matías Usandivaras | 40.28 | |
| | Venezuela | Jermaine Chirinos, Ronald Amaya, Álvaro Cassiani, Luis Luna | DQ | Rule 170.14 |
| | Chile | Ignacio Rojas, Cristián Reyes, Daniel Pineda, Kael Becerra | DNF | |
| | Dominican Republic | Gustavo Cuesta, Kelvin Herrera, Joel Hernández, Jean Carlos Peguero | DNF | |

=== 4 x 400 meters relay ===
June 15

| Rank | Nation | Competitors | Time | Notes |
|---|---|---|---|---|
| 1st place, gold medalist(s) | Cuba | Omar Cisneros, William Collazo, Yasmani Copello, Yeimer López | 3:03.22 | |
| 2nd place, silver medalist(s) | Brazil | Luís Ambrosio, Luíz Guilherme de Oliveira, André de Melo, Fernando de Almeida | 3:08.45 | |
| 3rd place, bronze medalist(s) | Dominican Republic | Orlando Frías, Tayron Reyes, Gustavo Cuesta, Kelvin Herrera | 3:08.70 | |
| 4 | Venezuela | Said Boni, Freddy Mezones, Víctor Solarte, Luis Luna | 3:09.00 | |
| 5 | Chile | Javier Vivar, Andy Muñoz, Luis Montenegro, José Vidal | 3:11.27 | |
| 6 | Argentina | José Ignacio Pignataro, Leandro Peyrano, Miguel Wilken, Esteban Brandan | 3:18.43 | |

=== 20,000 meters walk ===
June 15

| Rank | Name | Nationality | Time | Notes |
|---|---|---|---|---|
| 1st place, gold medalist(s) | José Alessandro Bagio | Brazil | 1:23:12.60 | |
| 2nd place, silver medalist(s) | Juan Manuel Cano | Argentina | 1:24:19.20 | |
| 3rd place, bronze medalist(s) | Patricio Ortega | Ecuador | 1:24:24.09 | |
| 4 | Miguel Ángel López | Spain | 1:24:52.51 | |
| 5 | Rafael Fontenelle | Brazil | 1:25:13.43 | |
| 6 | Pedro Daniel Gómez | Mexico | 1:26:02.61 | |
| 7 | Francisco Arcilla | Spain | 1:26:44.74 | |
| 8 | Yerko Araya | Chile | 1:27:44.89 | |
| 9 | Anibal Paau | Guatemala | 1:27:50.83 | |
| 10 | Edwin Centeno | Peru | 1:28:52.73 | |
| 11 | Mauricio Arteaga | Ecuador | 1:30:01.83 | |
| 12 | Cristián Bascuñán | Chile | 1:31:08.14 | |
| 13 | Jhon Garcias | Colombia | 1:32:40.10 | |
| 14 | Ronald Huayta | Bolivia | 1:33:24.65 | |
| 15 | Favio González | Argentina | 1:35:50.49 | |
| | Luis Gómez | Guatemala | DQ | |
| | Rodrigo Flores | Mexico | DQ | |
| | Gustavo Restrepo | Colombia | DQ | |
| | Yassir Cabrera | Panama | DQ | |

=== High jump ===
June 15

| Rank | Athlete | Nationality | 1.90 | 1.95 | 2.00 | 2.05 | 2.10 | 2.15 | 2.20 | 2.24 | Result | Notes |
|---|---|---|---|---|---|---|---|---|---|---|---|---|
| 1st place, gold medalist(s) | Jessé de Lima | Brazil | – | – | – | – | o | o | o | xxx | 2.20 | |
| 2nd place, silver medalist(s) | Fábio Baptista | Brazil | – | – | – | o | o | xo | o | xxx | 2.20 | |
| 3rd place, bronze medalist(s) | Santiago Guerci | Argentina | – | – | o | o | o | xxo | o | xxx | 2.20 | |
| 4 | Gerardo Martínez | Mexico | – | – | o | o | o | o | xxx | | 2.15 | |
| 5 | Gilmar Mayo | Colombia | – | – | – | – | o | o | xxx | | 2.15 | |
| 6 | Cristóbal Gómez | Chile | o | o | xxo | xo | xxx | | | | 2.05 | |

=== Pole vault ===
June 14

| Rank | Athlete | Nationality | 4.60 | 4.80 | 5.00 | 5.10 | Result | Notes |
|---|---|---|---|---|---|---|---|---|
| 1st place, gold medalist(s) | Henrique Martins | Brazil | o | o | xxo | xxx | 5.00 | |
| 2nd place, silver medalist(s) | Marcelo Terra | Argentina | o | o | xxo | xxx | 5.00 | |
| 3rd place, bronze medalist(s) | Guillermo Chiaraviglio, Jr. | Argentina | – | xo | xxx | | 4.80 | |
| 4 | Jorge Naranjo | Chile | xo | xo | xxx | | 4.80 | |
| | José Francisco Nava | Chile | xxx | | | | NM | |
| | João Gabriel Sousa | Brazil | – | xxx | | | NM | |

=== Long jump ===
June 13

| Rank | Athlete | Nationality | #1 | #2 | #3 | #4 | #5 | #6 | Result | Notes |
|---|---|---|---|---|---|---|---|---|---|---|
| 1st place, gold medalist(s) | Gaspar Araújo | Portugal | 7.60 | 7.82 | 7.70 | 7.64 | x | x | 7.82 | |
| 2nd place, silver medalist(s) | Jonathan Martínez | Spain | 6.82 | 7.05 | 7.27 | 7.22 | 7.31 | 7.64 | 7.64 | |
| 3rd place, bronze medalist(s) | Louis Tristán | Peru | 7.32 | x | 7.58 | x | – | – | 7.58 | |
| 4 | Rubens dos Santos Júnior | Brazil | 7.57 | 7.16 | x | – | – | 4.66 | 7.57 | |
| 5 | Jorge McFarlane | Peru | 7.34 | 7.08 | 7.37 | 7.18 | 7.32 | 7.23 | 7.37 | |
| 6 | Hugo Chila | Ecuador | 7.30 | 7.15 | 7.14 | 7.06 | 6.20 | x | 7.30 | |
| 7 | Eddy Florián | Dominican Republic | 6.83 | 7.05 | 7.12 | 7.05 | 7.06 | x | 7.12 | |
| 8 | Jorge Naranjo | Chile | x | 7.11 | 6.93 | x | x | 6.96 | 7.11 | |
| 9 | Jhamal Bowen | Panama | x | 7.06 | – | | | | 7.06 | |
| 10 | Daniel Pineda | Chile | 6.84 | 6.67 | 6.97 | | | | 6.97 | |
| 11 | Thiago Dias | Brazil | 6.96 | – | – | | | | 6.96 | |
| | Kessel Campbell | Honduras | x | x | x | | | | NM | |

=== Triple jump ===
June 15

| Rank | Athlete | Nationality | #1 | #2 | #3 | #4 | #5 | #6 | Result | Notes |
|---|---|---|---|---|---|---|---|---|---|---|
| 1st place, gold medalist(s) | Hugo Chila | Ecuador | 16.01 | 15.83 | 16.31 | 16.06 | 15.19 | 13.89 | 16.31 | |
| 2nd place, silver medalist(s) | Thiago Dias | Brazil | x | x | x | 15.53 | x | 15.39 | 15.53 | |
| 3rd place, bronze medalist(s) | Leonardo dos Santos | Brazil | x | 15.34 | x | x | x | 15.17 | 15.34 | |
| 4 | Juan Carlos Najera | Guatemala | x | x | 14.44 | 14.43 | x | 14.95 | 14.95 | |
| 5 | Eddy Florián | Dominican Republic | 14.81 | 14.65 | 14.59 | x | 14.79 | x | 14.81 | |
| 6 | José Francisco Nava | Chile | 14.46 | 14.67 | 14.43 | 14.56 | x | x | 14.67 | |

=== Shot put ===
June 13

| Rank | Athlete | Nationality | #1 | #2 | #3 | #4 | #5 | #6 | Result | Notes |
|---|---|---|---|---|---|---|---|---|---|---|
| 1st place, gold medalist(s) | Borja Vivas | Spain | 18.85 | 18.75 | x | 19.30 | 19.43 | 19.45 | 19.45 | |
| 2nd place, silver medalist(s) | Reynaldo Proenza | Cuba | 19.42 | 19.25 | x | 18.83 | x | 19.25 | 19.42 | |
| 3rd place, bronze medalist(s) | Germán Lauro | Argentina | 19.02 | 18.99 | x | x | x | 18.83 | 19.02 | |
| 4 | Marco Antonio Verni | Chile | 18.23 | x | 17.24 | 17.72 | 17.26 | x | 18.23 | |
| 5 | José María Peña | Spain | x | x | 17.75 | 18.10 | x | 18.10 | 18.10 | |
| 6 | Ronald Julião | Brazil | x | 17.12 | 17.64 | 17.58 | 17.58 | x | 17.64 | |
| 7 | Aldo Gonzáles | Bolivia | 16.09 | 16.59 | 17.11 | 16.11 | 16.09 | 16.31 | 17.11 | |
| 8 | Matías López | Chile | 16.40 | 15.79 | x | 15.45 | 15.83 | 15.94 | 16.40 | |

=== Discus throw ===
June 15

| Rank | Athlete | Nationality | #1 | #2 | #3 | #4 | #5 | #6 | Result | Notes |
|---|---|---|---|---|---|---|---|---|---|---|
| 1st place, gold medalist(s) | Jorge Balliengo | Argentina | 51.94 | 56.86 | 58.47 | 59.43 | 55.62 | 56.98 | 59.43 | |
| 2nd place, silver medalist(s) | Pedro José Cuesta | Spain | 55.83 | 54.09 | 57.34 | x | 55.73 | 57.67 | 57.67 | |
| 3rd place, bronze medalist(s) | Ronald Julião | Brazil | 56.04 | 56.77 | x | 56.32 | x | 56.16 | 56.77 | |
| 4 | Germán Lauro | Argentina | x | x | 56.53 | 55.84 | 54.23 | 51.58 | 56.53 | |
| 5 | Jesús Parejo | Venezuela | 52.17 | 54.10 | 56.43 | x | 56.36 | x | 56.43 | |
| 6 | José María Peña | Spain | x | 50.00 | x | x | 51.12 | 53.97 | 53.97 | |
| 7 | Maximiliano Alonso | Chile | x | 49.92 | 49.67 | 51.04 | x | x | 51.04 | |
| 8 | Donald Olmos | Bolivia | 48.26 | 48.33 | 47.33 | 46.38 | 47.44 | 47.37 | 48.33 | |

=== Hammer throw ===
June 14

| Rank | Athlete | Nationality | #1 | #2 | #3 | #4 | #5 | #6 | Result | Notes |
|---|---|---|---|---|---|---|---|---|---|---|
| 1st place, gold medalist(s) | Juan Ignacio Cerra | Argentina | x | 66.36 | 67.94 | 69.52 | 69.74 | 67.99 | 69.74 | |
| 2nd place, silver medalist(s) | Dário Manso | Portugal | 67.15 | 67.46 | 68.96 | x | 67.68 | x | 68.96 | |
| 3rd place, bronze medalist(s) | Moisés Campeny | Spain | x | 68.75 | x | x | x | 68.87 | 68.87 | |
| 4 | Patricio Palma | Chile | x | x | x | x | 67.22 | x | 67.22 | |
| 5 | Wagner Domingos | Brazil | 64.80 | 65.10 | 66.24 | x | x | 65.75 | 66.24 | |
| 6 | Raúl Rivera | Guatemala | 63.12 | 62.83 | x | x | x | x | 63.12 | |
| 7 | Adrián Marzo | Argentina | x | x | 60.32 | x | 61.80 | 61.99 | 61.99 | |
| | Leonardo Pino | Chile | | | | | | | DNS | |

=== Javelin throw ===
June 14

| Rank | Athlete | Nationality | #1 | #2 | #3 | #4 | #5 | #6 | Result | Notes |
|---|---|---|---|---|---|---|---|---|---|---|
| 1st place, gold medalist(s) | Anier Boué | Cuba | 78.77 | 77.78 | x | 73.54 | 68.67 | 68.40 | 78.77 | |
| 2nd place, silver medalist(s) | Noraldo Palacios | Colombia | 77.70 | 77.13 | 76.32 | 76.20 | 75.66 | 75.04 | 77.70 | |
| 3rd place, bronze medalist(s) | Víctor Fatecha | Paraguay | x | x | x | 75.81 | – | – | 75.81 | |
| 4 | Júlio César de Oliveira | Brazil | 67.37 | 71.54 | 68.82 | 71.35 | x | x | 71.54 | |
| 5 | Ignacio Guerra | Chile | 71.33 | 68.04 | 70.53 | x | 71.46 | 70.40 | 71.46 | |
| 6 | Pablo Pietrobelli | Argentina | 68.56 | 66.77 | 69.93 | 68.77 | 68.66 | 67.89 | 69.93 | |
| 7 | Jesús García | Venezuela | x | 59.72 | 59.32 | x | x | 58.32 | 59.72 | |
| 8 | François Pouzet | Chile | 58.99 | x | x | 57.96 | x | x | 58.99 | |

=== Decathlon ===
June 14–15

The highest mark recorded in each event is highlighted in yellow

| Rank | Athlete | Nationality | 100m | LJ | SP | HJ | 400m | 110m H | DT | PV | JT | 1500m | Points | Notes |
|---|---|---|---|---|---|---|---|---|---|---|---|---|---|---|
| 1st place, gold medalist(s) | Odirlei Carlos Pessoni | Brazil | 11.01 | 6.93 | 14.48 | 2.01 | 50.96 | 15.27 | 41.26 | 4.50 | 55.96 | 5:25.59 | 7362 | |
| 2nd place, silver medalist(s) | Ânderson Venâncio | Brazil | 11.05 | 7.07 | 12.30 | 1.89 | 49.60 | 15.35 | 30.36 | 4.00 | 53.75 | 4:59.97 | 6944 | |
| 3rd place, bronze medalist(s) | Tiago Marto | Portugal | 11.33 | 6.91 | 13.03 | 1.83 | 51.44 | 15.13 | 37.65 | 3.80 | 51.28 | 4:46.09 | 6915 | |
| 4 | Gerardo Canale | Argentina | 11.80 | 6.90 | 13.24 | 2.01 | 53.24 | 15.91 | 34.89 | 4.00 | 48.50 | 4:50.11 | 6752 | |
| 5 | Oscar Mina | Ecuador | 10.87 | 6.56 | 12.90 | 1.95 | 50.66 | 16.32 | 37.68 | 3.60 | 41.71 | 4:53.91 | 6690 | |
| | Matías López | Argentina | 11.14 | 6.87 | 11.23 | 1.98 | DQ | 15.64 | 30.77 | DNS | – | – | DNF | |
| | Andrés Montilla | Colombia | 11.39 | 6.63 | 12.88 | 1.86 | DNS | – | – | – | – | – | DNF | |

== Women's results ==
=== 100 meters ===
Heats – June 13
Wind:
Heat 1: -1.9 m/s, Heat 2: -2.5 m/s

| Rank | Heat | Name | Nationality | Time | Notes |
|---|---|---|---|---|---|
| 1 | 2 | Yomara Hinestroza | Colombia | 11.76 | Q |
| 2 | 1 | Celiangeli Morales | Puerto Rico | 11.93 | Q |
| 3 | 2 | Rosemar Coelho Neto | Brazil | 11.94 | Q |
| 4 | 1 | Lucimar de Moura | Brazil | 11.97 | Q |
| 5 | 1 | Daniela Pávez | Chile | 12.04 | Q |
| 6 | 1 | Nelcy Caicedo | Colombia | 12.18 | q |
| 7 | 2 | Roxana Mercado | Puerto Rico | 12.23 | Q |
| 8 | 1 | Prisciliana Chourio | Venezuela | 12.31 | q |
| 9 | 2 | Carolina Díaz | Chile | 12.59 | |

Final – June 13
Wind:
-1.5 m/s

| Rank | Lane | Name | Nationality | Time | Notes |
|---|---|---|---|---|---|
| 1st place, gold medalist(s) | 4 | Yomara Hinestroza | Colombia | 11.58 | |
| 2nd place, silver medalist(s) | 6 | Lucimar de Moura | Brazil | 11.70 | |
| 3rd place, bronze medalist(s) | 3 | Rosemar Coelho Neto | Brazil | 11.74 | |
| 4 | 7 | Daniela Pávez | Chile | 11.99 | |
| 5 | 2 | Roxana Mercado | Puerto Rico | 12.07 | |
| 6 | 8 | Nelcy Caicedo | Colombia | 12.22 | |
| 7 | 1 | Prisciliana Chourio | Venezuela | 12.35 | |
| | 5 | Celiangeli Morales | Puerto Rico | DQ | Rule 163.6 |

=== 200 meters ===
June 15
Wind: -0.5 m/s

| Rank | Lane | Name | Nationality | Time | Notes |
|---|---|---|---|---|---|
| 1st place, gold medalist(s) | 3 | Darlenys Obregón | Colombia | 23.84 | |
| 2nd place, silver medalist(s) | 2 | Wilmary Álvarez | Venezuela | 23.85 | |
| 3rd place, bronze medalist(s) | 6 | Rosemar Coelho Neto | Brazil | 23.86 | |
| 4 | 4 | Vanda Gomes | Brazil | 23.99 | |
| 5 | 7 | Gabriela Medina | Mexico | 24.21 | |
| 6 | 5 | Ruth Grajeda | Mexico | 24.25 | |
| 7 | 8 | Prisciliana Chourio | Venezuela | 25.01 | |

=== 400 meters ===
Heats – June 13

| Rank | Heat | Name | Nationality | Time | Notes |
|---|---|---|---|---|---|
| 1 | 2 | Josiane Tito | Brazil | 53.81 | Q |
| 2 | 1 | Maria Laura Almirão | Brazil | 53.86 | Q |
| 3 | 1 | Zudikey Rodríguez | Mexico | 54.06 | Q |
| 4 | 2 | Wilmary Álvarez | Venezuela | 54.23 | Q |
| 5 | 2 | Nallely Vela | Mexico | 54.39 | Q |
| 6 | 2 | Norma González | Colombia | 54.56 | q |
| 7 | 1 | Eliana Pacheco | Venezuela | 54.69 | Q |
| 8 | 2 | Lucy Jaramillo | Ecuador | 54.72 | q |
| 9 | 1 | Kelly López | Colombia | 54.75 | |
| 10 | 1 | Claudia Meneses | Peru | 57.58 | |

Final – June 14

| Rank | Lane | Name | Nationality | Time | Notes |
|---|---|---|---|---|---|
| 1st place, gold medalist(s) | 3 | Zudikey Rodríguez | Mexico | 52.14 | |
| 2nd place, silver medalist(s) | 6 | Wilmary Álvarez | Venezuela | 53.33 | |
| 3rd place, bronze medalist(s) | 5 | Maria Laura Almirão | Brazil | 53.34 | |
| 4 | 4 | Josiane Tito | Brazil | 53.61 | |
| 5 | 8 | Norma González | Colombia | 54.03 | |
| 6 | 7 | Nallely Vela | Mexico | 54.09 | |
| 7 | 2 | Eliana Pacheco | Venezuela | 54.85 | |
| 8 | 1 | Lucy Jaramillo | Ecuador | 57.74 | |

=== 800 meters ===
Heats – June 13

| Rank | Heat | Name | Nationality | Time | Notes |
|---|---|---|---|---|---|
| 1 | 1 | Perla Regina dos Santos | Brazil | 2:07.90 | Q |
| 2 | 1 | Muriel Coneo | Colombia | 2:08.21 | Q |
| 3 | 2 | Madelene Rondón | Venezuela | 2:08.73 | Q |
| 4 | 1 | Cristina Guevara | Mexico | 2:08.87 | Q |
| 5 | 1 | Élian Périz | Spain | 2:08.89 | q |
| 6 | 2 | Lizaira Del Valle | Puerto Rico | 2:09.01 | Q |
| 7 | 1 | Marcela Britos | Uruguay | 2:09.11 | q |
| 8 | 2 | Christiane dos Santos | Brazil | 2:09.15 | Q |
| 9 | 2 | Daisy Ugarte | Bolivia | 2:09.87 | |
| 10 | 2 | Andrea Ferris | Panama | 2:11.59 | |
| 11 | 1 | Gladys Tapia | Chile | 2:12.18 | |

Final – June 14

| Rank | Name | Nationality | Time | Notes |
|---|---|---|---|---|
| 1st place, gold medalist(s) | Christiane dos Santos | Brazil | 2:04.34 | |
| 2nd place, silver medalist(s) | Lizaira Del Valle | Puerto Rico | 2:04.37 | |
| 3rd place, bronze medalist(s) | Cristina Guevara | Mexico | 2:04.42 | |
| 4 | Muriel Coneo | Colombia | 2:04.46 | |
| 5 | Perla Regina dos Santos | Brazil | 2:06.19 | |
| 6 | Marcela Britos | Uruguay | 2:06.22 | NR |
| 7 | Madelene Rondón | Venezuela | 2:06.23 | |
| 8 | Élian Périz | Spain | 2:09.22 | |

=== 1500 meters ===
June 15

| Rank | Name | Nationality | Time | Notes |
|---|---|---|---|---|
| 1st place, gold medalist(s) | Sabine Heitling | Brazil | 4:18.78 | |
| 2nd place, silver medalist(s) | Nadia Rodríguez | Argentina | 4:23.24 | |
| 3rd place, bronze medalist(s) | Elena García | Spain | 4:23.45 | |
| 4 | Lizaira Del Valle | Puerto Rico | 4:24.44 | |
| 5 | Muriel Coneo | Mexico | 4:24.90 | |
| 6 | Yamilé Alaluf | Mexico | 4:27.68 | |
| 7 | Christiane dos Santos | Brazil | 4:31.85 | |
| 8 | Andrea Ferris | Panama | 4:33.44 | |
| 9 | Verónica Ángel | Chile | 4:43.66 | |
| | Valeria Rodríguez | Argentina | DNF | |
| | Ingrid Galloso | Chile | DNS | |

=== 3000 meters ===
June 14

| Rank | Name | Nationality | Time | Notes |
|---|---|---|---|---|
| 1st place, gold medalist(s) | Isabel Checa | Spain | 9:16.53 | |
| 2nd place, silver medalist(s) | Rosa Godoy | Argentina | 9:22.72 | |
| 3rd place, bronze medalist(s) | Nadia Rodríguez | Argentina | 9:29.58 | |
| 4 | Clara Morales | Chile | 9:36.15 | |
| 5 | María Isabel Montilla | Venezuela | 9:39.76 | |
| 6 | Andrea Ferris | Panama | 10:07.84 | |
| 7 | Verónica Ángel | Chile | 10:17.36 | |
| 8 | Sara Vassoleri | Brazil | 10:19.67 | |

=== 5000 meters ===
June 13

| Rank | Name | Nationality | Time | Notes |
|---|---|---|---|---|
| 1st place, gold medalist(s) | Sonia Bejarano | Spain | 16:01.00 | |
| 2nd place, silver medalist(s) | Fabiana da Silva | Brazil | 16:05.45 | |
| 3rd place, bronze medalist(s) | María Isabel Montilla | Venezuela | 16:30.60 | |
| 4 | Clara Morales | Chile | 16:38.17 | |
| 5 | Sonia Calizaya | Bolivia | 16:45.42 | |
| | Wilma Arizapana | Peru | DNS | |
| | Inés Melchor | Peru | DNS | |

=== 100 meters hurdles ===
June 14
Wind: -0.5 m/s

| Rank | Lane | Name | Nationality | Time | Notes |
|---|---|---|---|---|---|
| 1st place, gold medalist(s) | 4 | Francisca Guzmán | Chile | 13.56 | |
| 2nd place, silver medalist(s) | 5 | Briggite Merlano | Colombia | 13.60 | |
| 3rd place, bronze medalist(s) | 6 | Lucimara da Silva | Brazil | 13.61 | |
| 4 | 3 | Arantza Loureiro | Spain | 13.84 | |
| 5 | 2 | Fabiana Morães | Brazil | 13.97 | |
| 6 | 1 | Ljubica Milos | Chile | 14.17 | |
| 7 | 8 | Jeimy Bernárdez | Honduras | 14.28 | |
| 8 | 7 | Soledad Donzino | Argentina | 14.39 | |

=== 400 meters hurdles ===
June 14

| Rank | Lane | Name | Nationality | Time | Notes |
|---|---|---|---|---|---|
| 1st place, gold medalist(s) | 7 | Lucimar Teodoro | Brazil | 56.1 | |
| 2nd place, silver medalist(s) | 5 | Gisele Cruz | Brazil | 56.8 | |
| 3rd place, bronze medalist(s) | 6 | Lucy Jaramillo | Ecuador | 57.9 | |
| 4 | 4 | Laura Sotomayor | Spain | 58.5 | |
| 5 | 3 | Claudia Meneses | Peru | 1:00.9 | |
| 6 | 2 | Karen Sauterel | Chile | 1:04.3 | |

=== 3000 meters steeplechase ===
June 13

| Rank | Name | Nationality | Time | Notes |
|---|---|---|---|---|
| 1st place, gold medalist(s) | Sabine Heitling | Brazil | 9:54.70 | |
| 2nd place, silver medalist(s) | Rosa Godoy | Argentina | 10:00.36 | |
| 3rd place, bronze medalist(s) | Ángela Figueroa | Colombia | 10:02.13 | |
| 4 | Teresa Urbina | Spain | 10:06.70 | |
| | Irene Pelayo | Spain | DNF | |
| | Ingrid Galloso | Chile | DNS | |

=== 4 x 100 meters relay ===
June 15

| Rank | Nation | Competitors | Time | Notes |
|---|---|---|---|---|
| 1st place, gold medalist(s) | Colombia | Mirtha Brock, María Idrobo, Darlenys Obregón, Yomara Hinestroza | 44.89 | |
| 2nd place, silver medalist(s) | Brazil | Luciana dos Santos, Lucimar de Moura, Rosemar Coelho Neto, Ana Cláudia Lemos | 44.99 | |
| 3rd place, bronze medalist(s) | Chile | Ljubica Milos, Daniela Pávez, Carolina Díaz, Sicylle Jeria | 46.87 | |
| 4 | Bolivia | Carla Cavero, Marysabel Romero, Maitté Zamorano, Leslie Arnéz | 49.07 | |
| | Puerto Rico | Beatriz Cruz, Celiangeli Morales, Jennifer Gutiérrez, Irelis Burgos | DNF | |

=== 4 x 400 meters relay ===
June 15

| Rank | Nation | Competitors | Time | Notes |
|---|---|---|---|---|
| 1st place, gold medalist(s) | Mexico | Ruth Grajeda, Gabriela Medina, Nallely Vela, Zudikey Rodríguez | 3:33.27 | |
| 2nd place, silver medalist(s) | Brazil | Maria Laura Almirão, Perla Regina dos Santos, Sheila Ferreira, Josiane Tito | 3:34.01 | |
| 3rd place, bronze medalist(s) | Colombia | Mirtha Brock, Maria Idrobo, Kelly López, Norma González | 3:39.46 | |
| 4 | Venezuela | Eliana Pacheco, Madelene Rondón, Prisciliana Chourio, Wilmary Álvarez | 3:40.30 | |
| 5 | Bolivia | Marysabel Romero, Álison Sánchez, Adriana Mejía, Daisy Ugarte | 3:54.63 | |

=== 10,000 meters walk ===
June 14

| Rank | Name | Nationality | Time | Notes |
|---|---|---|---|---|
| 1st place, gold medalist(s) | Maribel Gonçalves | Portugal | 45:24.59 | |
| 2nd place, silver medalist(s) | Graciela Mendoza | Mexico | 46:43.94 | |
| 3rd place, bronze medalist(s) | Cisiane Lopes | Brazil | 46:54.20 | |
| 4 | Milángela Rosales | Venezuela | 47:02.88 | |
| 5 | Johana Ordóñez | Ecuador | 49:24.00 | |
| 6 | Claudia Cornejo | Bolivia | 50:06.24 | |
| 7 | Marcela Pacheco | Chile | 50:12.02 | |
| | Josette Sepúlveda | Chile | DNF | |
| | Leslie Guavita | Colombia | DQ | |
| | Rocío Florido | Spain | DQ | |
| | Tânia Spindler | Brazil | DQ | |

=== High jump ===
June 14

| Rank | Athlete | Nationality | 1.60 | 1.65 | 1.70 | 1.75 | 1.80 | 1.83 | 1.85 | 1.87 | 1.91 | Result | Notes |
|---|---|---|---|---|---|---|---|---|---|---|---|---|---|
| 1st place, gold medalist(s) | Eliana da Silva | Brazil | – | – | o | o | o | o | o | xo | xxx | 1.87 | |
| 2nd place, silver medalist(s) | Caterine Ibargüen | Colombia | – | – | – | o | o | xxo | o | xxx | | 1.85 | |
| 3rd place, bronze medalist(s) | Solange Witteveen | Argentina | – | – | o | o | o | o | xxx | | | 1.83 | |
| 4 | Gemma Martín-Pozuelo | Spain | – | – | o | xo | xo | xxx | | | | 1.80 | |
| 5 | Marielys Rojas | Venezuela | – | o | o | o | xxx | | | | | 1.75 | |
| 6 | Fabiola Ayala | Mexico | – | – | o | xxo | xxx | | | | | 1.75 | |
| 7 | Fernanda Delfino | Brazil | – | – | o | xxx | | | | | | 1.70 | |
| 8 | Tamara Maass | Chile | o | o | xxo | xxx | | | | | | 1.70 | |
| 9 | Florencia Vergara | Chile | o | xo | xxx | | | | | | | 1.65 | |

=== Pole vault ===
June 13

| Rank | Athlete | Nationality | 3.80 | 3.90 | 4.00 | 4.10 | 4.20 | 4.30 | Result | Notes |
|---|---|---|---|---|---|---|---|---|---|---|
| 1st place, gold medalist(s) | Joana Costa | Brazil | – | – | o | o | o | xxx | 4.20 | |
| 2nd place, silver medalist(s) | Carolina Torres | Chile | – | o | xo | o | xxx | | 4.10 | |
| 3rd place, bronze medalist(s) | Alejandra García | Argentina | – | – | o | xxx | | | 4.00 | |
| 3rd place, bronze medalist(s) | Keisa Monterola | Venezuela | – | o | o | xxx | | | 4.00 | |
| | Milena Agudelo | Colombia | – | xxx | | | | | NM | |
| | Karla da Silva | Brazil | xxx | | | | | | NM | |

=== Long jump ===
June 14

| Rank | Athlete | Nationality | #1 | #2 | #3 | #4 | #5 | #6 | Result | Notes |
|---|---|---|---|---|---|---|---|---|---|---|
| 1st place, gold medalist(s) | Arantza Loureiro | Spain | 6.05 | x | 6.25 | – | 6.16 | 6.11 | 6.25 | |
| 2nd place, silver medalist(s) | Eliane Martins | Brazil | x | x | 6.20 | x | x | 6.10 | 6.20 | |
| 3rd place, bronze medalist(s) | Claudette Martínez | Mexico | x | 5.86 | 5.87 | 5.77 | 5.89 | 5.81 | 5.89 | |
| 4 | Andrea Morales | Argentina | 5.85 | 5.70 | 5.58 | 5.59 | x | 5.85 | 5.85 | |
| 5 | Vanessa Seles | Brazil | 5.66 | x | 5.60 | x | 5.60 | 5.85 | 5.85 | |
| 6 | Daniela Riderelli | Chile | 5.78 | 5.50 | 5.72 | 5.58 | x | x | 5.78 | |
| 7 | Carla Cavero | Bolivia | x | 4.90 | 4.97 | 4.79 | 5.23 | x | 5.23 | |

=== Triple jump ===
June 15

| Rank | Athlete | Nationality | #1 | #2 | #3 | #4 | #5 | #6 | Result | Notes |
|---|---|---|---|---|---|---|---|---|---|---|
| 1st place, gold medalist(s) | Verónica Davis | Venezuela | 12.86 | 12.93 | 13.32 | 13.18 | 13.24 | 13.16 | 13.32 | |
| 2nd place, silver medalist(s) | Laurice Cristina Félix | Brazil | x | x | 12.86 | x | – | – | 12.86 | |
| 3rd place, bronze medalist(s) | Jennifer Arveláez | Venezuela | 12.70 | 12.84 | x | – | 12.51 | – | 12.84 | |
| 4 | Solange Witteveen | Argentina | 12.36 | 12.09 | 11.51 | 12.39 | 12.14 | 12.39 | 12.39 | |
| 5 | Andrea Morales | Argentina | x | 12.08 | 11.94 | 11.86 | 12.14 | 12.09 | 12.14 | |

=== Shot put ===
June 13

| Rank | Athlete | Nationality | #1 | #2 | #3 | #4 | #5 | #6 | Result | Notes |
|---|---|---|---|---|---|---|---|---|---|---|
| 1st place, gold medalist(s) | Natalia Ducó | Chile | x | 17.39 | 17.65 | 18.16 | 18.05 | 18.65 | 18.65 | AJR, NR |
| 2nd place, silver medalist(s) | Andréa Pereira | Brazil | 15.67 | x | 16.72 | 16.34 | x | 16.10 | 16.72 | |
| 3rd place, bronze medalist(s) | Ahymará Espinoza | Venezuela | 13.65 | 13.75 | x | 14.36 | x | 14.98 | 14.98 | |

=== Discus throw ===
June 15

| Rank | Athlete | Nationality | #1 | #2 | #3 | #4 | #5 | #6 | Result | Notes |
|---|---|---|---|---|---|---|---|---|---|---|
| 1st place, gold medalist(s) | Rocío Comba | Argentina | 51.86 | 52.41 | x | x | 54.49 | x | 54.49 | |
| 2nd place, silver medalist(s) | Karen Gallardo | Chile | 50.78 | 51.25 | 46.80 | 52.64 | 45.01 | 53.10 | 53.10 | |
| 3rd place, bronze medalist(s) | Elisângela Adriano | Brazil | 49.36 | 52.82 | x | x | x | x | 52.82 | |
| 4 | María Cubillán | Venezuela | 47.96 | 52.11 | 52.11 | x | 48.95 | 47.02 | 52.11 | |
| 5 | Andressa de Morais | Brazil | 44.58 | 50.39 | 48.29 | x | 47.60 | 41.65 | 50.39 | |
| 6 | Ximena Araneda | Chile | x | 41.65 | x | x | 45.05 | 45.01 | 45.05 | |

=== Hammer throw ===
June 14

| Rank | Athlete | Nationality | #1 | #2 | #3 | #4 | #5 | #6 | Result | Notes |
|---|---|---|---|---|---|---|---|---|---|---|
| 1st place, gold medalist(s) | Rosa Rodríguez | Venezuela | 60.23 | x | 65.96 | x | 60.28 | x | 65.96 | |
| 2nd place, silver medalist(s) | Jennifer Dahlgren | Argentina | 59.84 | x | 63.20 | 64.89 | 60.50 | 63.21 | 64.89 | |
| 3rd place, bronze medalist(s) | Josiane Soares | Brazil | 58.90 | x | 59.03 | 59.87 | 63.09 | x | 63.09 | |
| 4 | Johana Moreno | Colombia | 62.49 | 59.97 | x | x | x | x | 62.49 | |
| 5 | Odette Palma | Chile | x | 58.75 | x | x | 57.66 | 60.19 | 60.19 | |

=== Javelin throw ===
June 13

| Rank | Athlete | Nationality | #1 | #2 | #3 | #4 | #5 | #6 | Result | Notes |
|---|---|---|---|---|---|---|---|---|---|---|
| 1st place, gold medalist(s) | Alessandra Resende | Brazil | 55.20 | 53.14 | 56.31 | 56.59 | x | 52.43 | 56.59 | |
| 2nd place, silver medalist(s) | María González | Venezuela | 50.80 | 50.04 | 53.20 | 47.91 | 49.06 | 48.69 | 53.20 | |
| 3rd place, bronze medalist(s) | Zuleima Araméndiz | Colombia | x | 47.26 | 53.11 | x | 47.38 | 49.71 | 53.11 | |
| 4 | María Paz Ríos | Chile | 46.28 | 47.37 | 50.96 | x | x | 44.25 | 50.96 | |
| 5 | Romina Maggi | Argentina | 47.65 | 46.02 | 48.54 | x | 46.41 | 45.35 | 48.54 | |

=== Heptathlon ===
June 14–15

The highest mark recorded in each event is highlighted in yellow

| Rank | Athlete | Nationality | 100m H | HJ | SP | 200m | LJ | JT | 800m | Points | Notes |
|---|---|---|---|---|---|---|---|---|---|---|---|
| 1st place, gold medalist(s) | Lucimara da Silva | Brazil | 13.90 | 1.78 | 12.14 | 24.65 | 6.03 | 32.95 | 2:20.84 | 5739 | |
| 2nd place, silver medalist(s) | Ana Capdevila | Spain | 14.81 | 1.68 | 10.78 | 25.75 | 5.90 | 32.34 | 2:16.23 | 5312 | |
| 3rd place, bronze medalist(s) | Macarena Reyes | Chile | 14.87 | 1.65 | 11.06 | 25.28 | 5.92 | 33.56 | 2:22.11 | 5278 | |
| 4 | Sofia Pires | Portugal | 15.70 | 1.71 | 10.71 | 27.59 | 5.66 | 38.54 | 2:27:09 | 4974 | |
| | Elizete da Silva | Brazil | 15.79 | 1.65 | 12.45 | 25.65 | 5.98 | 26.45 | DNF | DNF | |
