= Leonardo Price =

Argentine middle-distance runner

Personal information
- Full name: Leonardo Nelson Price
- Nationality: Argentina
- Born: 21 February 1979 (age 47) Trelew, Argentina
- Height: 1.75 m (5 ft 9 in)
- Weight: 60 kg (132 lb)

Sport
- Sport: Athletics
- Event: Middle distance running
- Club: EMA Trelew (ARG)
- Coached by: Leonardo Michael Malgor

Achievements and titles
- Personal bests: 800 m: 1:46.90 (2008); 1500 m: 3:44.11 (2007)

Leonardo Nelson Price (born February 21, 1979, in Trelew) is an Argentine middle-distance runner. He is a three-time national champion for the 800 metres, and two-time for the 1500 metres.

Price represented Argentina at the 2008 Summer Olympics in Beijing, where he competed for the men's 800 metres. He ran in the second heat against six other competitors, including Sudan's Abubaker Kaki, who was a heavy favorite and a possible top medal contender in this event. He finished the race in sixth place by three fourths of a second (0.75) behind Slovakia's Jozef Repcìk, with a time of 1:49.39. Price, however, failed to advance into the semi-finals, as he placed fifty-first overall and was ranked farther below two mandatory slots for the next round.

== Competition record ==
Year	Competition	Venue	Position	Event	Notes
Representing Argentina
2005	South American Championships	Cali, Colombia	5th	800 m	1:49.64
2005	South American Championships	Cali, Colombia	7th	1500 m	3:51.72
2006	Ibero-American Championships	Ponce, Puerto Rico	9th (h)	800 m	1:50.81
2006	Ibero-American Championships	Ponce, Puerto Rico	5th	1500 m	3:48.68
2006	South American Championships	Tunja, Colombia	7th	800 m	1:54.99
2008	Ibero-American Championships	Iquique, Chile	4th	800 m	1:48.38
2008	Ibero-American Championships	Iquique, Chile	11th	1500 m	3:48.91
2008	Olympic Games	Beijing, China	51st (h)	800 m	1:49.39
2009	South American Championships	Lima, Peru	4th	800 m	1:50.75
2009	South American Championships	Lima, Peru	–	1500 m	DNF
