= Alessandra Resende =

Brazilian javelin thrower

Personal information
- Full name: Alessandra Nobre Resende
- Nationality: Brazil
- Born: 5 March 1975 (age 51) São Paulo, Brazil
- Height: 1.69 m (5 ft 6 1/2 in)
- Weight: 69 kg (152 lb)

Sport
- Sport: Athletics
- Event: Javelin throw

Achievements and titles
- Personal best: Javelin throw: 59.58 m (2007)
Medal record
Women's athletics
Representing Brazil
Ibero-American Championships
Gold medal – first place	2006 Ponce	Javelin throw
Gold medal – first place	2008 Iquique	Javelin throw
South American Championships
Gold medal – first place	2005 Cali	Javelin throw
Gold medal – first place	2006 Tunja	Javelin throw
Gold medal – first place	2007 São Paulo	Javelin throw
Gold medal – first place	2009 Lima	Javelin throw

Alessandra Nobre Resende (born March 5, 1975) is a Brazilian javelin thrower. She is a two-time Ibero-American and a four-time South American champion for her category. Resende, however, narrowly missed out of the medal podium, when she placed fifth in the final at the 2007 Pan American Games in Rio de Janeiro, with a best throw of 57.95 metres.

At age thirty-three, Resende made her Olympic debut at the 2008 Summer Olympics in Beijing, where she competed in the women's javelin throw. She threw the javelin into the field at 56.53 metres, finishing twenty-seventh overall in the qualifying rounds.

== Competition record ==
Year	Competition	Venue	Position	Event	Notes
Representing Brazil
1994	South American Junior Championships	Santa Fe, Argentina	1st	Javelin throw	52.52 m
1995	South American Championships	Manaus, Brazil	4th	Javelin throw	49.40 m
1996	Ibero-American Championships	Medellín, Colombia	8th	Javelin throw	47.08 m
1997	South American Championships	Mar del Plata, Argentina	4th	Javelin throw	50.54 m
1997	Universiade	Catania, Italy	10th	Javelin throw	51.64 m
1998	Ibero-American Championships	Lisbon, Portugal	5th	Javelin throw	45.99 m
1999	South American Championships	Bogotá, Colombia	4th	Javelin throw	54.34 m
2000	Ibero-American Championships	Rio de Janeiro, Brazil	5th	Javelin throw	51.22 m
2001	South American Championships	Manaus, Brazil	2nd	Javelin throw	50.83 m
2002	Ibero-American Championships	Guatemala City, Guatemala	5th	Javelin throw	51.86 m
2003	South American Championships	Barquisimeto, Venezuela	2nd	Javelin throw	57.01 m
2004	Ibero-American Championships	Huelva, Spain	4th	Javelin throw	55.23 m
2005	South American Championships	Cali, Colombia	1st	Javelin throw	56.06 m
2006	Ibero-American Championships	Ponce, Puerto Rico	1st	Javelin throw	55.12 m
2006	South American Championships	Tunja, Colombia	1st	Javelin throw	58.11 m
2007	South American Championships	São Paulo, Brazil	1st	Javelin throw	57.75 m
2007	Pan American Games	Rio de Janeiro, Brazil	5th	Javelin throw	57.95 m
2007	World Championships	Osaka, Japan	22nd (q)	Javelin throw	56.42 m
2008	Ibero-American Championships	Iquique, Chile	1st	Javelin throw	56.59 m
2008	Olympic Games	Beijing, China	27th (q)	Javelin throw	56.53 m
2009	South American Championships	Lima, Peru	1st	Javelin throw	56.36 m
2011	South American Championships	Buenos Aires, Argentina	3rd	Javelin throw	54.61 m
