= Track and field at the 2011 Military World Games – Men's 400 metres hurdles =

The men's 400 metres hurdles event at the 2011 Military World Games was held on 19 and 20 July at the Estádio Olímpico João Havelange.

== Records ==
Prior to this competition, the existing world and CISM record were as follows:

World Record	Kevin Young (USA)	46.78	Barcelona, Spain	6 August 1992
CISM World Record	Thomas Goller (GER)	48.75	Zagreb, Croatia	August 1999

== Schedule ==
Date	Time	Round
19 July 2011	16:00	Semifinals
20 July 2011	16:00	Final

== Medalists ==
Gold	Silver	Bronze
Raphael Fernandes; Brazil	Víctor Solarte; Venezuela	Leonardo Capotosti; Italy

== Results ==
=== Final ===
Rank	Lane	Name	Nationality	Time	Notes
1st place, gold medalist(s)	5	Raphael Fernandes	Brazil	50.50	
2nd place, silver medalist(s)	4	Víctor Solarte	Venezuela	50.60	
3rd place, bronze medalist(s)	6	Leonardo Capotosti	Italy	50.86	
4	3	Miloud Rahmani	Algeria	50.95	
5	1	Nathan Garcia	United States	51.08	
6	2	Varghese Shejil	India	52.03	
7	8	Fausto Santini	Switzerland	52.13	
	7	Andreas Ritz	Switzerland	DNF	
