= Víctor Solarte =

Venezuelan hurdler (born 1986)

Personal information
- Born: 6 January 1986 (age 40)

Sport
- Sport: Track and field
Medal record
Representing Venezuela
Military World Games
Silver medal – second place	2011 Rio de Janeiro	400 m hurdles
South American Championships
Silver medal – second place	2005 Cali	400 m hurdles
Bronze medal – third place	2006 Tunja	4 × 400 m relay
Bronze medal – third place	2011 Buenos Aires	400 m hurdles
Bronze medal – third place	2015 Lima	400 m hurdles

Víctor José Solarte (born 6 January 1986) is a Venezuelan track and field hurdler who competed in the 400 metres hurdles. His personal best was 50.53 seconds, set in 2009. He was a twenty four-time national champion.

Solarte competed at the 2003 World Youth Championships in Athletics and 2004 World Junior Championships in Athletics, but has never represented his country at the senior World Championships in Athletics. His highest level global honour was a silver behind Raphael Fernandes at the 2011 Military World Games (his time there was 50.60 seconds, among his career best).

At the South American Championships in Athletics he was the hurdles runner-up to Tiago Bueno in 2005, and won further individual bronze medals at the 2011 and 2015 editions. He also won a 4 × 400 metres relay bronze with Venezuela in 2006. He was the 2005 hurdles champion at the South American Junior Championships in Athletics, having won the youth silver behind Diego Venâncio in 2002.

In other regional competitions, he has won minor medals at the ALBA Games and Bolivarian Games. He is a four-time participant (2008, 2010, 2012, 2016) and has been a finalist at the Central American and Caribbean Games and Championships. He represented Venezuela at the 2011 Pan American Games, failing to reach the final.

== International competitions ==
Year	Competition	Venue	Position	Event	Notes
2002	South American Youth Championships	Asunción, Paraguay	2nd	400 m hurdles	54.24
2003	South American Junior Championships	Guayaquil, Ecuador	6th	400 m hurdles	55.30
2003	World Youth Championships	Sherbrooke, Canada	6th (heats)	400 m hurdles	54.37
2004	South American U23 Championships	Barquisimeto, Venezuela	4th	400 m hurdles	51.14
2004	World Junior Championships	Grosseto, Italy	5th (semis)	400 m hurdles	51.69
2005	South American Championships	Cali, Colombia	2nd	400 m hurdles	51.00
2005	Bolivarian Games	Armenia, Colombia	2nd	400 m hurdles	51.51
2005	South American Junior Championships	Rosario, Argentina	1st	400 m hurdles	51.30
2005	South American Junior Championships	Rosario, Argentina	5th	4 × 400 m relay	42.19
2006	South American Championships	Tunja, Colombia	5th	400 m hurdles	52.32
2006	South American Championships	Tunja, Colombia	3rd	4 × 400 m relay	3:10.43
2006	South American Games/ South American U23 Championships	Buenos Aires, Argentina	7th	400 m hurdles	52.80
2006	South American Games/ South American U23 Championships	Buenos Aires, Argentina	4th	4 × 400 m relay	3:11.41
2008	Ibero-American Championships	Iquique, Chile	5th	400 m hurdles	51.66
2008	Ibero-American Championships	Iquique, Chile	4th	4 × 400 m relay	3:09.00
2008	CAC Championships	Cali, Colombia	4th	400 m hurdles	51.40
2008	CAC Championships	Cali, Colombia	4th	4 × 400 m relay	3:06.10
2008	South American U23 Championships	Lima, Peru	4th	400 m hurdles	53.25
2008	South American U23 Championships	Lima, Peru	2nd	4 × 400 m relay	3:15.19
2009	ALBA Games	Havana, Cuba	3rd	400 m hurdles	51.07
2009	South American Championships	Lima, Peru	6th	400 m hurdles	53.08
2009	Bolivarian Games	Sucre, Bolivia	2nd	400 m hurdles	51.83
2010	Ibero-American Championships	San Fernando, Spain	10th (heats)	400 m hurdles	51.64
2011	South American Championships	Buenos Aires, Argentina	3rd	400 m hurdles	51.13
2011	Military World Games	Rio de Janeiro, Brazil	2nd	400 m hurdles	50.60
2011	Pan American Games	Guadalajara, Mexico	12th	400 m hurdles	51.31
2011	ALBA Games	Barquisimeto, Venezuela	2nd	400 m hurdles	53.68
2012	Ibero-American Championships	Barquisimeto, Venezuela	11th (heats)	400 m hurdles	54.37
2013	South American Championships	Cartagena, Colombia	5th	400 m hurdles	51.62
2013	Bolivarian Games	Trujillo, Peru	4th	400 m hurdles	50.58
2014	CAC Games	Xalapa, Mexico	6th	400 m hurdles	51.01
2015	South American Championships	Lima, Peru	3rd	400 m hurdles	50.83
2015	Military World Games	Mungyeong, South Korea	11th (heats)	400 m hurdles	52.84
2015	Military World Games	Mungyeong, South Korea	3rd (q)	4 × 400 m relay	3:05.86
2016	Ibero-American Championships	Rio de Janeiro, Brazil	11th (heats)	400 m hurdles	51.69
