= Jessé de Lima =

Brazilian high jumper

Personal information
- Born: 16 February 1981 (age 45) Recife, Brazil

Sport
- Sport: Track and field

Jessé Farias de Lima (born 16 February 1981) is a Brazilian high jumper. His personal best jump is 2.32 metres, achieved in September 2008 in Lausanne. This is the current Brazilian record.

== Major competitions record ==
| Year | Competition | Venue | Position | Notes |
Representing Brazil
| 1999 | South American Championships | Bogotá, Colombia | 5th | 2.15 m |
| 1999 | Pan American Junior Championships | Tampa, United States | 1st | 2.21 m |
| 1999 | South American Junior Championships | Concepción, Chile | 1st | 2.09 m |
| 2000 | Ibero-American Championships | Rio de Janeiro, Brazil | – | NM |
| 2000 | South American Junior Championships | São Leopoldo, Brazil | 1st | 2.09 m |
| 2000 | World Junior Championships | Santiago, Chile | 4th | 2.18 m |
| 2001 | South American Championships | Manaus, Brazil | 1st | 2.20 m |
| 2001 | Universiade | Beijing, China | 10th | 2.20 m |
| 2002 | Ibero-American Championships | Guatemala City, Guatemala | 2nd | 2.23 m |
| 2003 | South American Championships | Barquisimeto, Venezuela | 2nd | 2.22 m |
| 2003 | Pan American Games | Santo Domingo, Dominican Republic | 6th | 2.16 m |
| 2004 | Ibero-American Championships | Huelva, Spain | 2nd | 2.21 m |
| 2004 | Olympic Games | Athens, Greece | 17th (q) | 2.25 m |
| 2006 | Ibero-American Championships | Ponce, Puerto Rico | 1st | 2.24 m |
| 2006 | World Cup | Athens, Greece | 6th | 2.15 m |
| 2006 | South American Championships | Tunja, Colombia | 1st | 2.28 m |
| 2007 | South American Championships | São Paulo, Brazil | 1st | 2.24 m |
| 2007 | Pan American Games | Rio de Janeiro, Brazil | 4th | 2.24 m |
| 2007 | World Championships | Osaka, Japan | 13th | 2.21 m |
| 2008 | Ibero-American Championships | Iquique, Chile | 1st | 2.20 m |
| 2008 | Olympic Games | Beijing, China | 10th | 2.20 m |
| 2009 | South American Championships | Lima, Peru | 1st | 2.16 m |
| 2009 | World Championships | Berlin, Germany | 14th (q) | 2.27 m |
