= Francisca Guzmán =

Chilean hurdler (born 1981)

Personal information
- Born: 21 June 1981 (age 44)

Sport
- Sport: Track and field

Francisca Guzmán (born 21 June 1981) is a retired Chilean athlete who specialised in the 100 metres hurdles.

Her personal bests of 13.30 seconds in the 100 metres hurdles (2003) and 8.54 seconds in the 60 metres hurdles (2009) are both standing national records.

== Competition record ==
| Year | Competition | Venue | Position | Event | Notes |
Representing Chile
| 1998 | South American Junior Championships | Córdoba, Argentina | 1st | 100 m hurdles | 14.16 |
| 1998 | World Youth Games | Moscow, Russia | 10th (sf) | 100 m hurdles | 14.49 |
| 1998 | World Youth Games | Moscow, Russia | 3rd | 4 × 100 m relay | 48.13 |
| 1999 | South American Championships | Bogotá, Colombia | 6th | 100 m hurdles | 14.18 |
| 1999 | South American Junior Championships | Concepción, Chile | 3rd | 100 m hurdles | 14.62 |
| 2000 | Ibero-American Championships | Rio de Janeiro, Brazil | 9th (h) | 100 m hurdles | 14.35 |
| 2000 | South American Junior Championships | São Leopoldo, Brazil | 3rd | 100 m hurdles | 14.35 |
| 2000 | World Junior Championships | Santiago, Chile | 20th (h) | 100 m hurdles | 13.83 (+0.6 m/s) |
| 2000 | World Junior Championships | Santiago, Chile | 11th (h) | 4 × 100 m relay | 46.40 |
| 2001 | World Indoor Championships | Lisbon, Portugal | 26th (h) | 60 m hurdles | 8.85 |
| 2001 | South American Championships | Manaus, Brazil | 6th | 100 m hurdles | 14.30 |
| 2001 | South American Championships | Manaus, Brazil | 4th | 4 × 100 m relay | 48.81 |
| 2002 | Ibero-American Championships | Guatemala City, Guatemala | 4th | 100 m hurdles | 13.71 |
| 2003 | South American Championships | Barquisimeto, Venezuela | 4th | 100 m hurdles | 13.94 |
| 2003 | Pan American Games | Santo Domingo, Dominican Republic | 12th (h) | 100 m hurdles | 14.04 |
| 2003 | Universiade | Daegu, South Korea | 21st (h) | 100 m hurdles | 13.97 |
| 2004 | Ibero-American Championships | Huelva, Spain | 6th | 100 m hurdles | 13.90 |
| 2005 | South American Championships | Cali, Colombia | 4th | 100 m hurdles | 13.85 |
| 2006 | Ibero-American Championships | Ponce, Puerto Rico | 3rd | 100 m hurdles | 13.45 |
| 2006 | South American Championships | Tunja, Colombia | 2nd | 100 m hurdles | 13.83 |
| 2008 | Ibero-American Championships | Iquique, Chile | 1st | 100 m hurdles | 13.56 |
| 2009 | South American Championships | Lima, Peru | 4th | 100 m hurdles | 13.57 |
| 2010 | Ibero-American Championships | San Fernando, Spain | 8th | 100 m hurdles | 13.85 |
