= Andréa Maria Britto =

Brazilian shot putter

Personal information
- Born: 8 December 1973 (age 51) Araçatuba, Brazil

Sport
- Sport: Track and field

Andréa Maria Pereira Britto (born 8 December 1973) is a Brazilian athlete who specialises in the shot put. She won multiple medals on the regional level.

She has personal bests of 16.90 metres outdoors (2007) and 16.50 metres indoors (2010).

== Competition record ==
Year	Competition	Venue	Position	Event	Notes
Representing Brazil
2000	Ibero-American Championships	Rio de Janeiro, Brazil	3rd	Shot put	14.86 m
2001	South American Championships	Manaus, Brazil	2nd	Shot put	15.64 m
2002	Ibero-American Championships	Guatemala City, Guatemala	7th	Shot put	14.94 m
2003	South American Championships	Barquisimeto, Venezuela	4th	Shot put	16.19 m
2005	South American Championships	Cali, Colombia	1st	Shot put	16.60 m
2006	South American Championships	Tunja, Colombia	2nd	Shot put	16.27 m
2007	Pan American Games	Rio de Janeiro, Brazil	8th	Shot put	16.52 m
2008	Ibero-American Championships	Iquique, Chile	2nd	Shot put	16.72 m
2009	South American Championships	Lima, Peru	3rd	Shot put	16.16 m
2009	Lusophony Games	Lisbon, Portugal	2nd	Shot put	16.26 m
2011	South American Championships	Buenos Aires, Argentina	4th	Shot put	16.02 m
2012	Ibero-American Championships	Barquisimeto, Venezuela	6th	Shot put	15.92 m
