= Gládson Barbosa =

Brazilian steeplechaser

Personal information
- Born: 16 August 1979 (age 46) Montes Claros, State of Minas Gerais, Brazil

Sport
- Sport: Track and field

Gládson Silva Barbosa (born 16 August 1979) is a Brazilian athlete who specialises in the 3000 metres steeplechase. He has won multiple medals at the regional level.

== Competition record ==
Year	Competition	Venue	Position	Event	Notes
Representing Brazil
2006	South American Championships	Tunja, Colombia	3rd	3000 m s'chase	9:22.51
2007	South American Championships	São Paulo, Brazil	2nd	3000 m s'chase	8:43.69
2007	Pan American Games	Rio de Janeiro, Brazil	4th	3000 m s'chase	8:40.32
2008	Ibero-American Championships	Iquique, Chile	4th	3000 m	8:02.09
2008	Ibero-American Championships	Iquique, Chile	3rd	3000 m s'chase	8:44.93
2009	South American Championships	Lima, Peru	–	3000 m s'chase	DNF
2012	Ibero-American Championships	Barquisimeto, Venezuela	3rd	3000 m s'chase	8:50.83
2013	South American Championships	Cartagena, Colombia	3rd	3000 m s'chase	8:45.10
2014	South American Games	Santiago, Chile	7th	3000 m s'chase	8:58.80

== Personal bests ==
- 1500 metres – 3:50.94 (Uberlândia 2007)
- 2000 metres – 5:08.63 (Fortaleza 2008)
- 3000 metres – 8:05.88 (São Paulo 2008)
- 5000 metres – 14:03.59 (Fortaleza 2007)
- 3000 metres steeplechase – 8:35.77 (Neerpelt 2008)
