= Leonardo Capotosti =

Italian hurdler

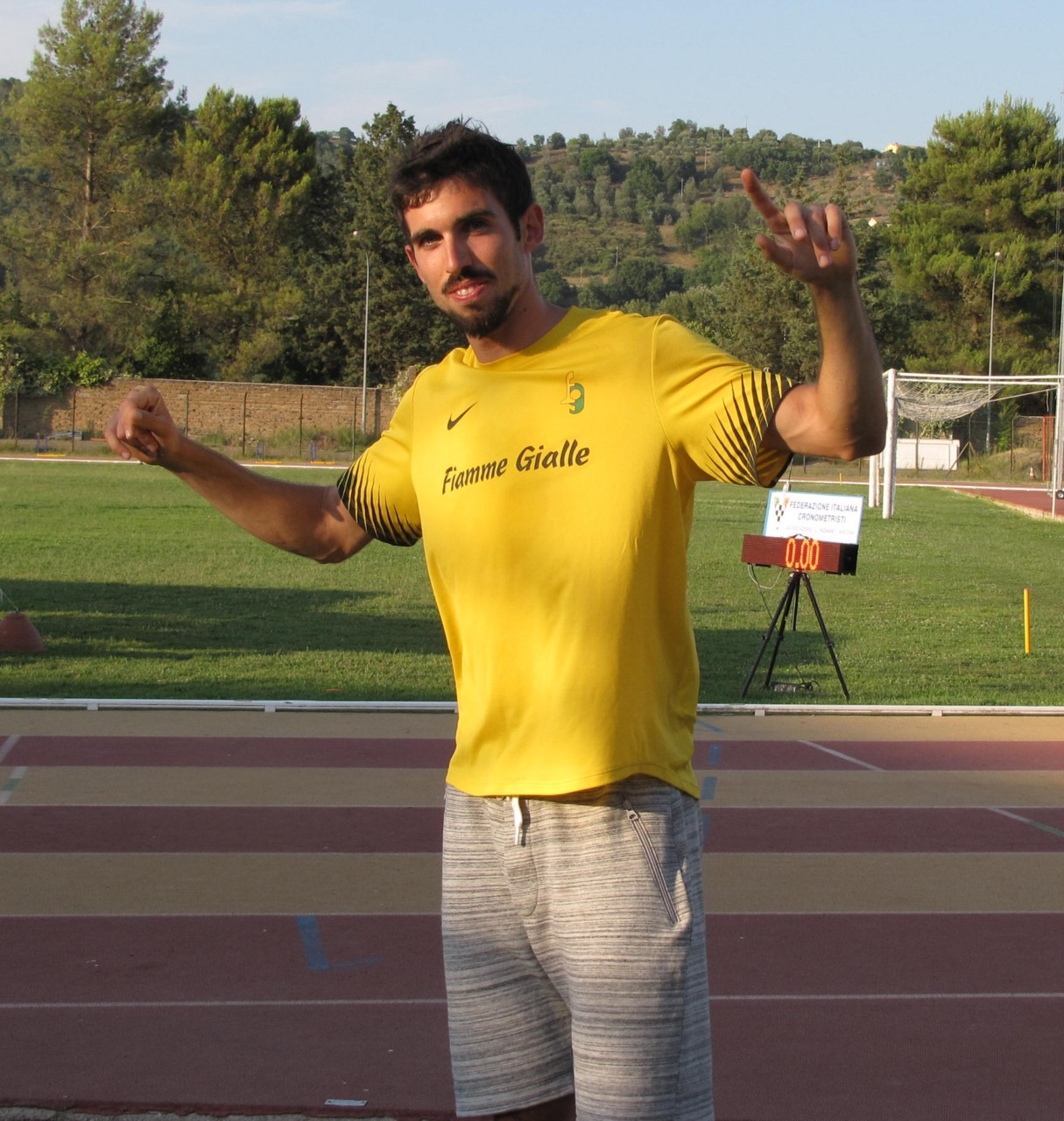

Personal information
- Nationality: Italian
- Born: 24 July 1988 (age 37) Terni, Italy
- Height: 1.90 m (6 ft 3 in)
- Weight: 85 kg (187 lb)

Sport
- Country: Italy
- Sport: Athletics
- Event: 400 metres hurdles
- Club: G.S. Fiamme Gialle

Achievements and titles
- Personal best: 400 m hs: 49.93 (2015)
Medal record
European Team Championships
Bronze medal – third place	2015 Cheboksary	400 m hs
Military World Games
Bronze medal – third place	2011 Rio de Janeiro	400 m hs

Leonardo Capotosti (born 24 July 1988) is an Italian male 400 metres hurdler.

== Biography ==
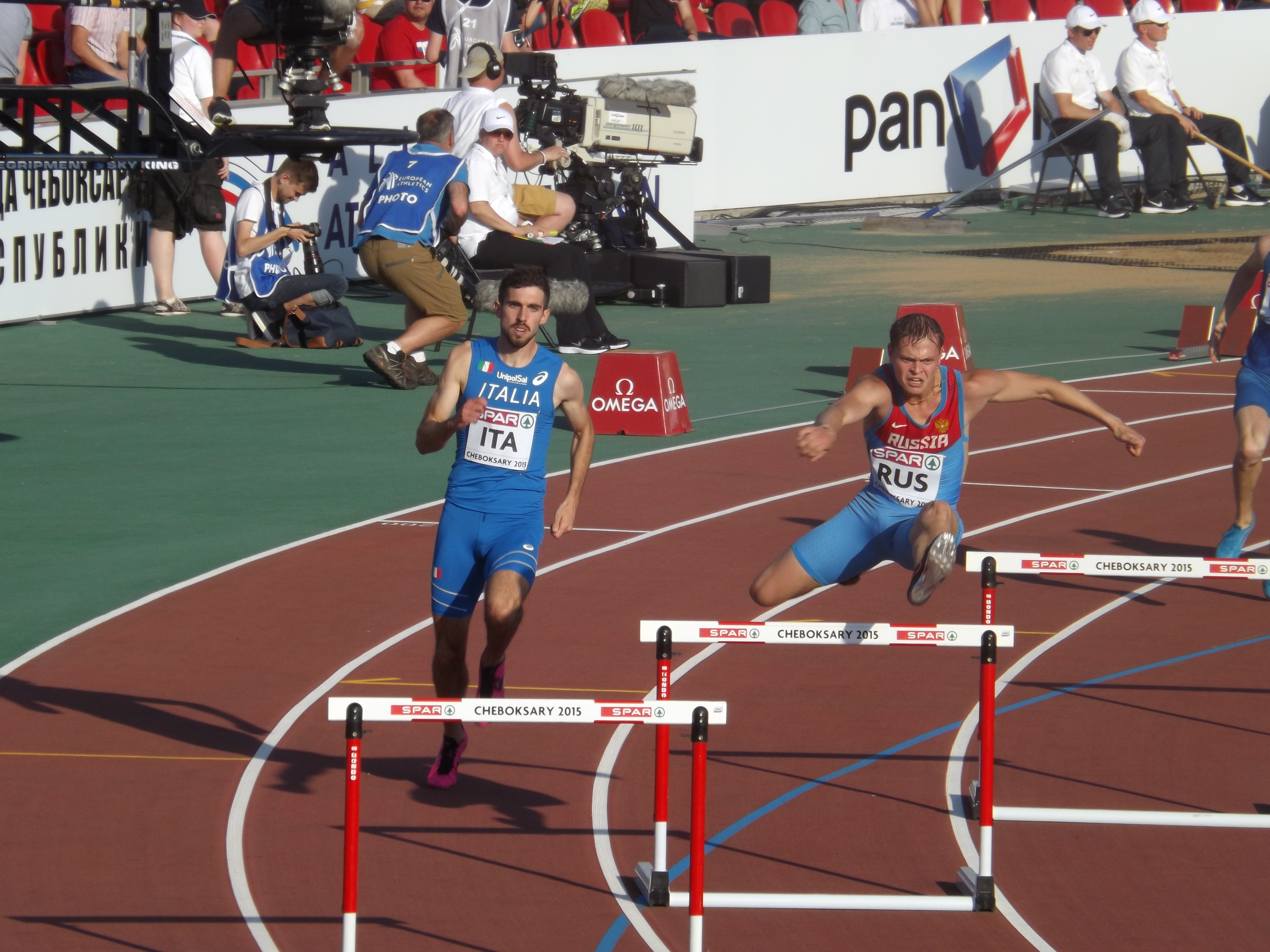
Capotosti at the 2015 European Team Championships.

His best result at the international senior level was the third place in the 2015 European Team Championships Super League final. He also won two national championships at individual senior level, Italian Athletics Championships where he, in 2018, reached his eleventh consecutive final in the 400 metres hurdles race.

== Achievements ==
Year	Competition	Venue	Position	Event	Time	Notes
2011	Military World Games	(Brazil) Rio de Janeiro	3rd	400 m hs	50.86	
2014	European Championships	(Switzerland) Zürich	SF (15th)	400 m hs	50.21	
2015	European Team Championships	(Russia) Cheboksary	3rd	400 m hs	49.93	PB

== National titles ==
- Italian Athletics Championships
  - 400 metres hurdles: 2014, 2015

== See also ==
- Italy at the European Cup (athletics)
