= Athletics at the 2007 Pan American Games – Women's javelin throw =

Women's javelin throw at the Pan American Games

The women's javelin throw event at the 2007 Pan American Games was held on July 27.

== Results ==
Rank	Athlete	Nationality	#1	#2	#3	#4	#5	#6	Result	Notes
1st place, gold medalist(s)	Osleidys Menéndez	Cuba	x	62.34	59.04	x	61.12	60.60	62.34	SB
2nd place, silver medalist(s)	Sonia Bisset	Cuba	58.33	60.68	59.05	x	59.51	60.34	60.68	
3rd place, bronze medalist(s)	Laverne Eve	Bahamas	57.21	57.90	56.78	58.10	56.66	58.10	58.10	
4	Dana Pounds	United States	53.28	58.00	x	57.28	55.73	57.39	58.00	
5	Alessandra Resende	Brazil	55.33	55.35	57.95	56.20	x	57.21	57.95	
6	Erma-Gene Evans	Saint Lucia	43.31	49.45	54.23	52.52	x	44.76	54.23	
7	Dalila Rugama	Nicaragua	51.78	52.36	50.11	x	50.63	x	52.36	
8	Leryn Franco	Paraguay	48.43	52.24	x	49.26	x	52.20	52.24	
9	Zuleima Araméndiz	Colombia	46.63	47.61	47.95				47.95	
10	Jucilene de Lima	Brazil	45.76	x	46.59				46.59	
