= Raphael Fernandes =

Brazilian hurdler (born 1984)

Personal information
- Born: 8 November 1984 (age 41) São Bernardo do Campo, Brazil

Sport
- Sport: Track and field
Medal record
Men's athletics
Representing Brazil
South American Championships
Gold medal – first place	2007 São Paulo	400 m hurdles
Gold medal – first place	2007 São Paulo	4×400 m relay
Silver medal – second place	2009 Lima	400 m hurdles
Bronze medal – third place	2006 Tunja	400 m hurdles
Military World Games
Gold medal – first place	2011 Rio de Janeiro	400 m hurdles

Raphael Fernandes (born 8 November 1984) is a Brazilian track and field athlete who competes in the 400 metres hurdles. His personal best for the event is 49.29 seconds, set in 2007. He represented his country at the 2007 World Championships in Athletics.

Fernandes won two gold medals at the 2007 South American Championships in Athletics and also reached the podium at that competition in 2006 and 2009. He was the winner of the 400 m hurdles at the 2011 Military World Games in Rio de Janeiro and has also won medals at the Lusophony Games and the South American Games.

== Career ==
Born in São Bernardo do Campo, São Paulo, he is trained by former South American record holder Sanderlei Parrela. His first success in athletics came as a youth as he won the gold medals at the 2002 South American Games and the 2002 South American Junior Athletics Championships. The following year he was runner-up to fellow Brazilian Ricardo da Silva at the South American Juniors and was fourth at the 2003 Pan American Junior Championships, beaten to a medal by Javier Culson. He ran a personal best of 50.04 seconds to win his first senior national title in the 400 m hurdles in 2004. That same year he was third at the South American Under 23 Athletics Championships.

In 2005 he ran under 50 seconds for the 400 m hurdles for the first time, clocking 49.89 sec in the heats of the Brazilian championships, but he was beaten to the national title by Tiago Bueno. He began his 2006 season by winning the South American University Games title. He was the runner-up nationally that year and gained his first senior level medals: he was the hurdles bronze medallist at the 2006 South American Championships in Athletics and helped Brazil to the 4×400 metres relay title. At the first Lusophony Games he took the hurdles silver and won a further gold medal in the relay; an achievement he repeated at the 2006 South American Games the following month.

Fernandes reached new heights in 2007, setting a 400 metres sprint best of 46.56 seconds and a 400 m hurdles best of 49.29 seconds to win his second national title in the event. He was a double gold medallist at the 2007 South American Championships in Athletics, winning both the hurdles and relay titles, and made his global debut at the 2007 World Championships in Athletics (though he was knocked out in the heats stage). He also represented Brazil at the 2007 Pan American Games (where he was a finalist) and the 2007 Summer Universiade.

After a low-key 2008, in which he failed to run under 50 seconds and was sixth nationally, he returned to the international podium in 2009, coming second at the 2009 South American Championships in Athletics and taking the hurdles gold at the 2009 Lusophony Games. Injuries ruled him out for most of 2010. The 2011 Military World Games in Rio de Janeiro saw Fernandes win his first global level medal as he held off Víctor Solarte to claim the hurdles gold.
