= 2006 South American Championships in Athletics =

44th South American Championships
- Dates: 29 September – 1 October
- Host city: Tunja, Colombia
- Venue: Estadio La Independencia
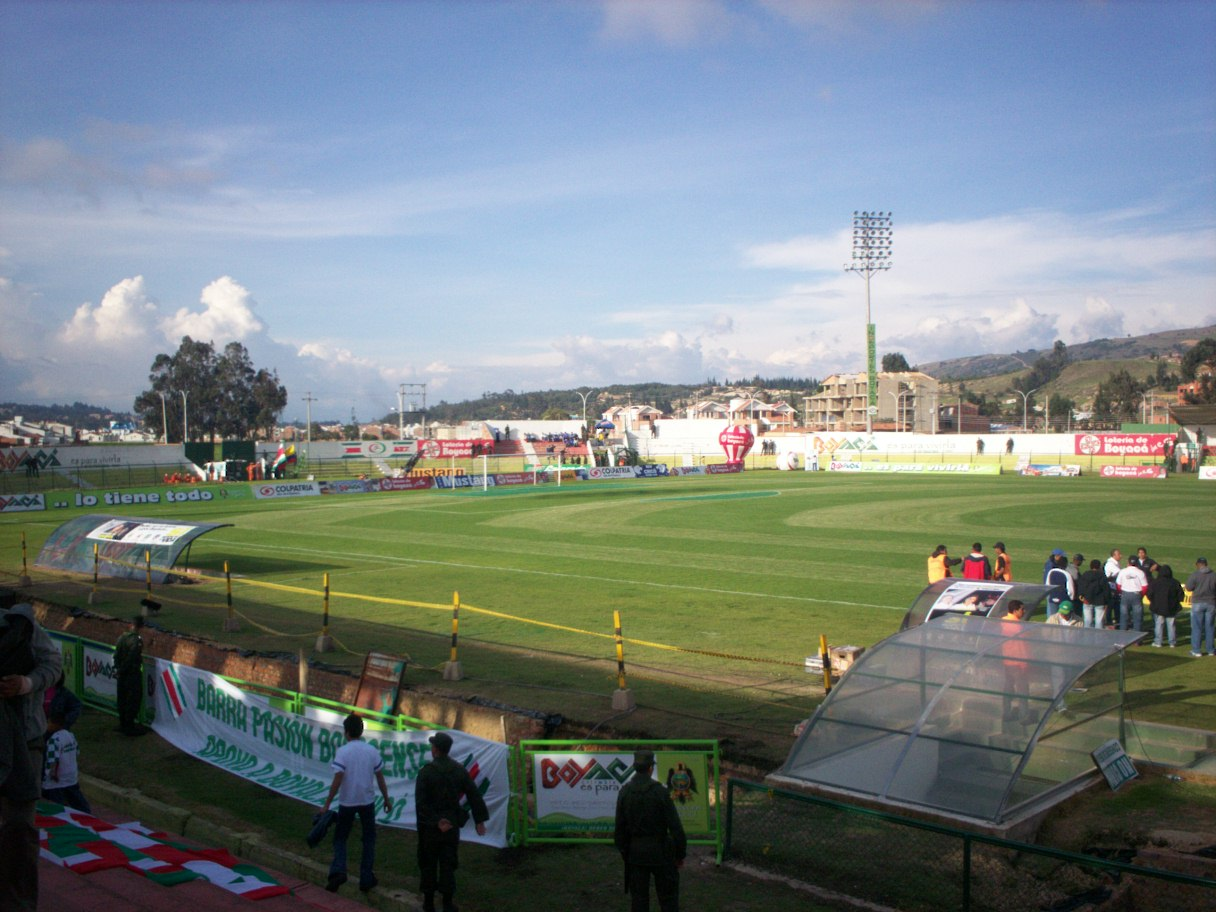
- Events: 44
- Participation: 229 athletes from 12 nations
- Records set: 5 Championships records

The 2006 South American Championships in Athletics were held at the Estadio La Independencia in Tunja, Colombia from 29 September to 1 October. The competition represented a departure from the traditional biennial cycle of the championships, a decision taken partly as a response to the lack of major competitions that year for the region's athletes, as well as the fact many athletes would instead focus on the 2007 World Championships in Athletics and the Pan American Games (in Rio de Janeiro) which were scheduled for the following year. The stadium's location at 2810 metres above sea level aided the performances of athletes competing in the sprint and field events. A total of 44 events were contested, of which 22 by male and 22 by female athletes.

Brazil continued its dominance in the medals and points tables with 26 gold medals and 55 medals in all, adding to an undefeated streak in the men's and women's sides since the 1975 edition. The hosts Colombia were clear runners-up with nine golds and 36 medals, while Argentina and Ecuador were the next most successful nations. Cold, windy conditions affected athletes performances over the course of the three-day competition, but five Championships records were broken or equalled. Pole vaulter Fabiana Murer won her first continental title with a record clearance of 4.40 m, while Argentine Germán Chiaraviglio equalled the best mark in the men's event. Jessé de Lima beat defending high jump champion Gilmar Mayo in a record height and Jennifer Dahlgren retained her hammer throw title with a new record.

Colombian Bertha Sánchez became champion in three events (5000 m, 10,000 m and steeplechase) and her compatriot Caterine Ibargüen took a gold and two silver medals in the jumping events, as well as setting a national record in the triple jump. Brazil's Elisângela Adriano won both the shot put and discus throw disciplines. Two more of her compatriots scored event doubles: Lucimar Teodoro won the 400 metres and the 400 metres hurdles, while the 100 metres and 200 metres titles went to Rosemar Coelho Neto.

== Records ==
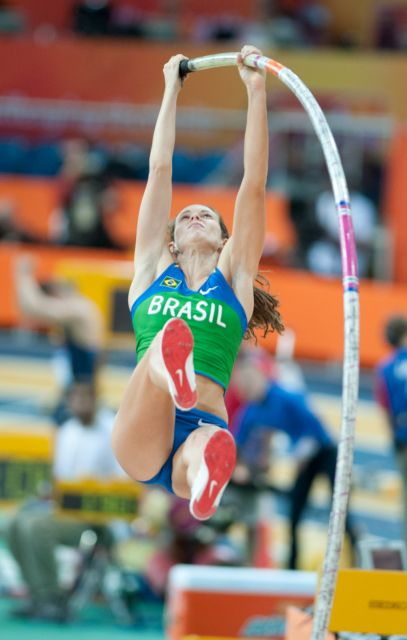
Fabiana Murer won her first continental pole vault title with a Championship record.

=== Men ===
| Name | Event | Country | Record | Type |
|---|---|---|---|---|
| Jessé de Lima | High jump | Brazil | 2.28 m | CR |
| Germán Chiaraviglio | Pole vault | Argentina | 5.40 m | CR= |
| Louis Tristán | Long jump | Peru | 8.09 m | NR |
| Noraldo Palacios | Javelin throw | Colombia | 79.09 m | NR |
Key:WR — World record • AR — Area record • CR — Championship record • NR — National record

=== Women ===
| Name | Event | Country | Record | Type |
|---|---|---|---|---|
| Fabiana Murer | Pole vault | Brazil | 4.47 m | CR |
| Tânia Ferreira da Silva | Triple jump | Brazil | 13.92 m | CR |
| Jennifer Dahlgren | Hammer throw | Argentina | 69.07 m | CR |
| Caterine Ibargüen | Triple jump | Colombia | 13.91 m | NR |
| Katiuscia de Jesus | Hammer throw | Brazil | 64.58 | NR |
Key:WR — World record • AR — Area record • CR — Championship record • NR — National record

== Medal summary ==
=== Men ===
| Event | Gold | | Silver | | Bronze | |
|---|---|---|---|---|---|---|
| 100 metres | Daniel Grueso (COL) | 10.50 | Kael Becerra (CHI) | 10.50 | José Carlos Moreira (BRA) | 10.51 |
| 200 metres | Basílio de Morães (BRA) | 20.70 | Daniel Grueso (COL) | 20.99 | Heber Viera (URU) | 21.10 |
| 400 metres | Sanderlei Parrela (BRA) | 46.19 | Eduardo Vasconcelos (BRA) | 46.65 | Javier Mosquera (COL) | 46.88 |
| 800 metres | Fabiano Peçanha (BRA) | 1:49.55 | Hudson de Souza (BRA) | 1:49.97 | John Chávez (COL) | 1:51.81 |
| 1500 metres | Hudson de Souza (BRA) | 3:46.98 | Fredy Espinoza (COL) | 3:50.82 | Byron Piedra (ECU) | 3:54.48 |
| 5000 metres | Juan Diego Contreras (PER) | 14:59.06 | Byron Piedra (ECU) | 15:00.00 | Eduardo Arequipa (BOL) | 15:00.70 |
| 10,000 metres | Jacinto López (COL) | 31:41.00 | Juan Diego Contreras (PER) | 31:41.58 | Jason Gutiérrez (COL) | 31:44.25 |
| 110 metres hurdles | Paulo Villar (COL) | 13.62 | Anselmo da Silva (BRA) | 13.78 | Matheus Facho Inocêncio (BRA) | 13.84 |
| 400 metres hurdles | Tiago Bueno (BRA) | 49.96 | Luis Montenegro (CHI) | 50.17 | Raphael Fernandes (BRA) | 50.49 |
| 3000 metres steeplechase | Sergio Lobos (CHI) | 9:15.42 | Diego Moreno (PER) | 9:21.28 | Gladson Barbosa (BRA) | 9:22.51 |
| 4×100 metres relay | Brazil (BRA); Eliezer de Almeida; Basílio de Moraes Júnior; Vicente de Lima; José Carlos Moreira | 39.03 | Colombia (COL); Harlin Echevarría; Eduard Mena; Álvaro Gómez; Paulo Villar | 40.17 | Argentina (ARG); José Manuel Garaventa; Gustavo Aguirre; Iván Altamirano; Mariano Jiménez | 40.47 |
| 4×400 metres relay | Brazil (BRA); Fernando de Almeida; Sanderlei Parrela; Eduardo Vasconcelos; Raphael Fernandes | 3:03.05 | Colombia (COL); Geiner Mosquera; Amílcar Torres; Javier Mosquera; Juan Pablo Maturana | 3:06.49 | Venezuela (VEN); Josner Rodríguez; José Céspedes; Víctor Solarte; Roberto Lineros | 3:10.43 |
| 20,000 m walk | Gustavo Restrepo (COL) | 1:28:12.0 | Xavier Moreno (ECU) | 1:29:50.2 | Patricio Ortega (ECU) | 1:35:29.1 |
| High jump | Jessé de Lima (BRA) | 2.28 m CR | Gilmar Mayo (COL) | 2.20 m | Santiago Guerci (ARG); Fábio Baptista (BRA) | 2.13 m |
| Pole vault | Germán Chiaraviglio (ARG) | 5.40 m CR= | Javier Benítez (ARG) | 5.35 m | Fábio Gomes da Silva (BRA) | 5.20 m |
| Long jump | Rogério Bispo (BRA) | 8.32 m (w) | Louis Tristán (PER) | 8.09 m NR | Rodrigo Araújo (BRA) | 8.05 m |
| Triple jump | Hugo Chila (ECU) | 16.68 m (w) | Thiago Carahyba Dias (BRA) | 16.57 m (w) | Jhon Murillo (COL) | 16.36 m (w) |
| Shot put | Germán Lauro (ARG) | 18.97 m | Marco Antonio Verni (CHI) | 18.62 m | Marcelo Moreira (BRA) | 17.84 m |
| Discus throw | Jorge Balliengo (ARG) | 60.19 m | Ronald Julião (BRA) | 57.02 m | Gustavo Mendonça (BRA) | 51.15 m |
| Hammer throw | Juan Ignacio Cerra (ARG) | 71.20 m | Patricio Palma (CHI) | 67.30 m | Wagner Domingos (BRA) | 67.27 m |
| Javelin throw | Noraldo Palacios (COL) | 79.09 m NR | Víctor Fatecha (PAR) | 76.79 m NJR | João Carlos Martins (BRA) | 75.26 m |
| Decathlon | Carlos Eduardo Chinin (BRA) | 7208 pts | Erik Kerwitz (ARG) | 7188 pts | Enrique Aguirre (ARG) | 6683 pts |
WR world record | AR area record | CR championship record | GR games record | NR national record | OR Olympic record | PB personal best | SB season best | WL world leading (in a given season)

=== Women ===
| Event | Gold | | Silver | | Bronze | |
|---|---|---|---|---|---|---|
| 100 metres | Rosemar Coelho Neto (BRA) | 11.53 | Yomara Hinestroza (COL) | 11.72 | Darlenys Obregón (COL) | 11.72 |
| 200 metres | Rosemar Coelho Neto (BRA) | 23.44 | Darlenys Obregón (COL) | 23.58 | Vanda Gomes (BRA) | 23.76 |
| 400 metres | Lucimar Teodoro (BRA) | 53.31 | Perla Regina dos Santos (BRA) | 53.82 | María Alejandra Idrobo (COL) | 53.94 |
| 800 metres | Christiane Ritz dos Santos (BRA) | 2:10.15 | Muriel Coneo (COL) | 2:14.13 | Diana Armas (ECU) | 2:18.67 |
| 1500 metres | Juliana de Azevedo (BRA) | 4:33.74 | Ana Joaquina Rondón (COL) | 4:37.03 | Muriel Coneo (COL) | 4:55.24 |
| 5000 metres | Bertha Sánchez (COL) | 17:16.39 | Ana Joaquina Rondón (COL) | 17:17.11 | Rosa Apaza (BOL) | 17:18.31 |
| 10,000 metres | Bertha Sánchez (COL) | 37:36.16 | Ednalva da Silva (BRA) | 37:37.47 | Rosa Apaza (BOL) | 37:38.12 |
| 100 metres hurdles | Maíla Machado (BRA) | 13.28 | Francisca Guzmán (CHI) | 13.83 | Gilveneide de Oliveira (BRA) | 14.06 |
| 400 metres hurdles | Lucimar Teodoro (BRA) | 58.16 | Perla dos Santos (BRA) | 58.40 | Lucy Jaramillo (ECU) | 58.93 |
| 3000 metres steeplechase | Bertha Sánchez (COL) | 10:48.44 | Zenaide Vieira (BRA) | 10:56.16 | Michelle Barreto de Costa (BRA) | 11:34.53 |
| 4×100 metres relay | Brazil (BRA); Maíla Machado; Lucimar de Moura; Rosemar Coelho Neto; Vanda Gomes | 44.72 | Colombia (COL); Shirley Aragón; María Alejandra Idrobo; Darlenys Obregón; Yomara Hinestroza | 44.78 | Ecuador (ECU); Erika Chávez; Lucy Jaramillo; Mayra Pachito; Victoria Quiñonez | 47.47 |
| 4×400 metres relay | Brazil (BRA); Lucimar Teodoro; Perla Regina dos Santos; Sheila Ferreira; Juliana de Azevedo | 3:32.56 | Colombia (COL); Muriel Coneo; Princesa Oliveros; Shirley Aragón; María Alejandra Idrobo | 3:37.12 | Ecuador (ECU); Erika Chávez; Lucy Jaramillo; Diana Armas; Karina Caicedo | 3:47.58 |
| 20,000 m walk | Yadira Guamán (ECU) | 1:46:06.7 | Luz Villamarín (COL) | 1:46:40.3 | Magaly Andrade (ECU) | 1:46:40.4 |
| High jump | Caterine Ibargüen (COL) | 1.90 m | Solange Witteveen (ARG) | 1.82 m | Eliana Renata da Silva (BRA) | 1.82 m |
| Pole vault | Fabiana Murer (BRA) | 4.47 m CR | Carolina Torres (CHI) | 4.25 m | Alejandra García (ARG) | 4.00 m |
| Long jump | Maurren Maggi (BRA) | 6.86 m (w) | Caterine Ibargüen (COL) | 6.51 m (w) | Fernanda Gonçalves (BRA) | 6.36 m (w) |
| Triple jump | Tânia Ferreira da Silva (BRA) | 13.92 m CR | Caterine Ibargüen (COL) | 13.91 m NR | Fabrícia da Silva (BRA) | 13.39 m |
| Shot put | Elisângela Adriano (BRA) | 17.37 m | Andréa Pereira (BRA) | 16.27 m | Luz Dary Castro (COL) | 16.26 m |
| Discus throw | Elisângela Adriano (BRA) | 56.18 m | Luz Dary Castro (COL) | 48.88 m | Karen Gallardo (CHI) | 48.75 m |
| Hammer throw | Jennifer Dahlgren (ARG) | 69.07 m CR | Johana Moreno (COL) | 64.94 m | Katiuscia de Jesus (BRA) | 64.58 m NR |
| Javelin throw | Alessandra Resendre (BRA) | 58.11 m | Zuleima Araméndiz (COL) | 55.60 m | Sabina Moya (COL) | 54.52 m |
| Heptathlon | Elizete da Silva (BRA) | 5612 pts | Jailma de Lima (BRA) | 5348 pts | Andrea Bordalejo (ARG) | 5015 pts |
WR world record | AR area record | CR championship record | GR games record | NR national record | OR Olympic record | PB personal best | SB season best | WL world leading (in a given season)

== Medal table ==
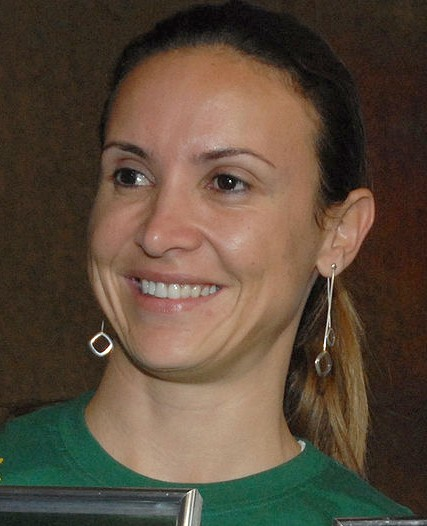
Brazilian Maurren Maggi returned from a doping ban to win her fourth long jump title.

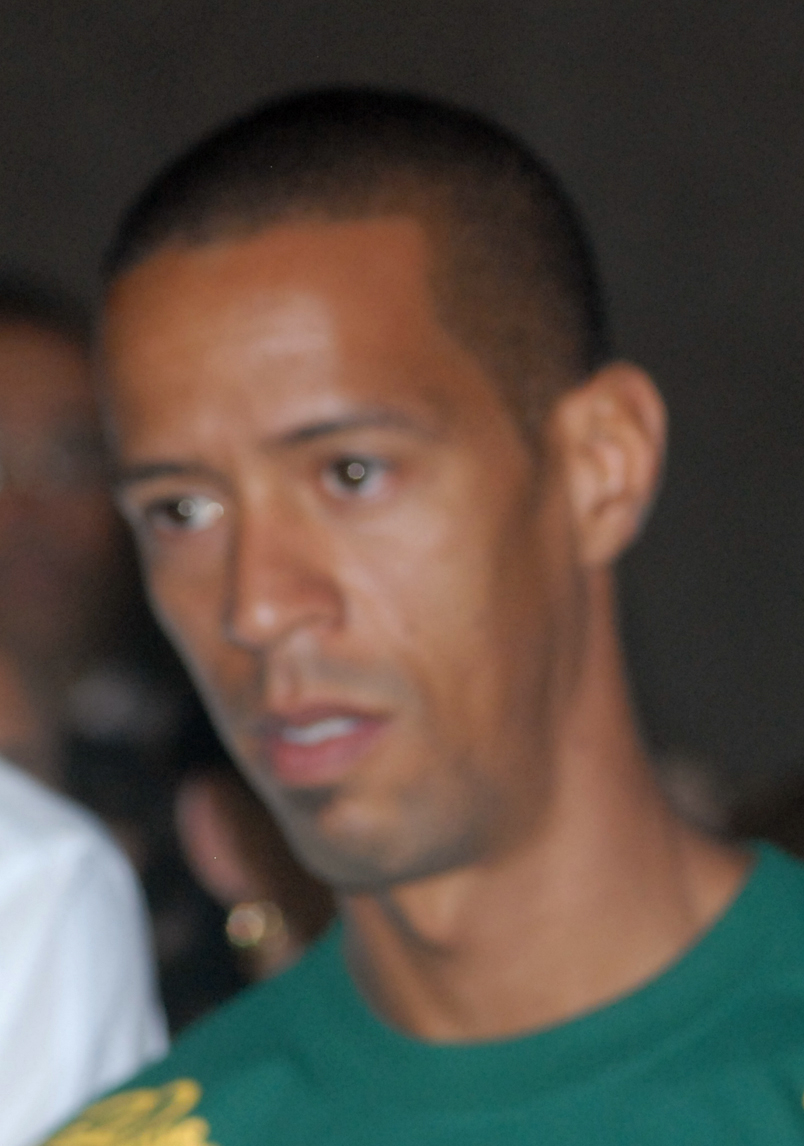
Hudson de Souza won a gold and a silver medal for Brazil.

* Host nation (Colombia)

| Rank | Nation | Gold | Silver | Bronze | Total |
|---|---|---|---|---|---|
| 1 | Brazil | 26 | 11 | 18 | 55 |
| 2 | Colombia* | 9 | 18 | 9 | 36 |
| 3 | Argentina | 5 | 3 | 5 | 13 |
| 4 | Ecuador | 2 | 2 | 7 | 11 |
| 5 | Chile | 1 | 6 | 1 | 8 |
| 6 | Peru | 1 | 3 | 0 | 4 |
| 7 | Paraguay | 0 | 1 | 0 | 1 |
| 8 | Bolivia | 0 | 0 | 3 | 3 |
| 9 | Uruguay | 0 | 0 | 1 | 1 |
| 9 | Venezuela | 0 | 0 | 1 | 1 |
| Totals (10 entries) | | 44 | 44 | 45 | 133 |

=== Points table ===
- Totals are calculated by awarding a country points for each time an athlete finishes in the top six of an event.

| Rank | Country | Total | Men | Women |
|---|---|---|---|---|
| 1 | Brazil | 498 | | |
| 2 | Colombia | 317 | | |
| 3 | Argentina | 152 | | |
| 4 | Ecuador | 116 | | |
| 5 | Chile | 67 | | |
| 6 | Peru | 28 | | |

== Participation ==
- Argentina (30)
- Bolivia (4)
- Brazil (68)
- Chile (18)
- Colombia (63)
- Ecuador (28)
- Guyana (1)
- Panama (2)
- Paraguay (2)
- Peru (3)
- Uruguay (3)
- Venezuela (7)
