= Tiago Bueno =

Brazilian hurdler

Tiago Florêncio Bueno (born 21 February 1983, in Campinas) is a Brazilian athlete specialising in the 400 metres hurdles. He won several medals on the regional level.

His personal best in the event is 49.59, set in 2005.

== Competition record ==
Year	Competition	Venue	Position	Event	Notes
Representing Brazil
2000	South American Junior Championships	Bogotá, Colombia	2nd	400 m hurdles	54.17
2001	South American Junior Championships	Santa Fe, Argentina	2nd	400 m hurdles	52.61
2005	South American Championships	Cali, Colombia	1st	400 m hurdles	50.87
2006	Ibero-American Championships	Ponce, Puerto Rico	5th	400 m hurdles	51.89
2006	South American Championships	Tunja, Colombia	1st	400 m hurdles	49.96
2008	Ibero-American Championships	Iquique, Chile	3rd	400 m hurdles	51.20
2010	Ibero-American Championships	San Fernando, Spain	4th	400 m hurdles	50.83
