= Lucimar Teodoro =

Brazilian track and field athlete (born 1981)

Personal information
- Born: 1 May 1981 (age 45) Guararapes, São Paulo

Sport
- Sport: Track and field
Medal record
Representing Brazil
Pan American Games
Bronze medal – third place	2003 Santo Domingo	4x400m relay

Lucimar Teodoro (born 1 May 1981) is a Brazilian track and field athlete who specialises in the 400 metres sprint and the 400 metres hurdles.

Teodoro was born in Guararapes, São Paulo and began competing in senior athletics in 2001. She attended her first Olympics at the 2004 Athens Games as part of the 4×400 metres relay team. However, the team did not reach the final of the event. Teodoro won both the sprint and hurdling 400 m titles at the 2005 national championships and reached the semi-finals of sprint event at the 2005 World Championships in Athletics. She competed at the following World Championships in Osaka, this time in the 400 m hurdles, but did not progress to the finals. At the 2008 Beijing Olympics Teodoro represented Brazil in the 400 m hurdles, and the 4×400 metres relay.

She set a new South American record in the 400 m hurdles with a time of 55.84 seconds in Belém at the Grande Prêmio Brasil Caixa meet in May 2009. Following this, she finished second at the Troféu Brasil Caixa de Atletismo to Luciana França, who challenged Teodoro's record by running a new personal best of 55.90 seconds. In July, she won the gold at the 2009 Lusophony Games.

However, she tested positive for banned substances (Fenproporex) soon after and was provisionally banned from competition and was not selected for the 2009 World Championships in Athletics. After admitting her use of a banned substance, she was suspended from competition for the minimum of two years by the Brazilian Athletics Confederation.

== Achievements ==
Year	Competition	Venue	Position	Event	Notes
Representing Brazil
2006	South American Championships	Tunja, Colombia	1st	400 m	53.31 s
2006	South American Championships	Tunja, Colombia	1st	400 m hurdles	58.16 s

== Personal bests ==
Event	Time (seconds)	Venue	Date
100 metres hurdles	14.48	São Paulo, Brazil	28 February 2007
400 metres hurdles	55.84 AR	Belém, Brazil	24 May 2009
400 metres	51.23	São Paulo, Brazil	17 June 2005

- All information taken from IAAF profile.

== See also ==
- List of doping cases in sport
