= Geiner Mosquera =

Colombian sprinter (born 1984)

Personal information
- Full name: Geiner Alonso Mosquera Becerra
- Nationality: Colombia
- Born: 8 January 1984 (age 42) Chigorodó, Antioquia, Colombia
- Height: 1.87 m (6 ft 1 1/2 in)
- Weight: 75 kg (165 lb)

Sport
- Sport: Athletics
- Event: Sprint

Achievements and titles
- Personal best: 400 m: 45.86 s (2009)
Medal record
Men's athletics
Representing Colombia
Ibero-American Championships
Gold medal – first place	2008 Iquique	400 m

Geiner Alonso Mosquera Becerra (born January 8, 1984, in Chigorodó, Antioquia) is a Colombian sprinter, who specialized in the 400 metres. He won a gold medal at the 2008 Ibero-American Championships, with a time of 46.63 seconds.

== Playing career ==
Mosquera represented Colombia at the 2008 Summer Olympics in Beijing, where he competed for the men's 400 metres. He ran in the fifth heat against seven other athletes, including Belgium's Jonathan Borlée and United States' LaShawn Merritt, both of whom were heavy favorites in this event. He finished the race in seventh place by forty-four hundredths of a second (0.44) behind Grenada's Alleyne Francique, with a time of 46.59 seconds. Mosquera, however, failed to advance into the semi-finals, as he placed forty-fifth overall, and was ranked farther below three mandatory slots for the next round.
