= Aldo González =

Bolivian shot putter

Personal information
- Full name: Aldo Luis González Barbery
- Born: September 5, 1984 (age 41)
- Height: 1.74 m (5 ft 9 in)
- Weight: 120 kg (265 lb)

Sport
- Sport: Athletics
- Event: Shot put

Aldo Luis González Barbery (born 5 September 1984) is a Bolivian athlete specialising in the shot put. He won a bronze medal at the 2014 South American Games and silver at the 2018 South American Games.

His personal best in the event is 19.11 metres set in Santa Cruz in 2016. This is the current national record.

== International competitions ==
Year	Competition	Venue	Position	Event	Notes
Representing Bolivia
2006	South American Championships	Tunja, Colombia	6th	Shot put	16.80 m
2006	South American Games / South American U23 Championships	Buenos Aires, Argentina	6th	Shot put	15.79 m
2006	South American Games / South American U23 Championships	Buenos Aires, Argentina	9th	Discus throw	41.50 m
2008	Ibero-American Championships	Iquique, Chile	7th	Shot put	17.11 m
2009	South American Championships	Lima, Peru	7th	Shot put	16.77 m
2009	Bolivarian Games	Sucre, Bolivia	6th	Shot put	16.93 m
2010	Ibero-American Championships	San Fernando, Spain	15th	Shot put	16.71 m
2011	South American Championships	Buenos Aires, Argentina	6th	Shot put	16.76 m
2011	ALBA Games	Barquisimeto, Venezuela	3rd	Shot put	17.08 m
2011	Pan American Games	Guadalajara, Mexico	12th	Shot put	17.06 m
2012	Ibero-American Championships	Barquisimeto, Venezuela	8th	Shot put	16.98 m
2013	South American Championships	Cartagena, Colombia	6th	Shot put	17.22 m
2013	Bolivarian Games	Trujillo, Peru	1st	Shot put	18.23 m
2014	South American Games	Santiago, Chile	3rd	Shot put	18.15 m
2014	Ibero-American Championships	São Paulo, Brazil	4th	Shot put	17.14 m
2014	Pan American Sports Festival	Mexico City, Mexico	5th	Shot put	16.86 m
2015	South American Championships	Lima, Peru	5th	Shot put	17.22 m
2016	Ibero-American Championships	Rio de Janeiro, Brazil	6th	Shot put	18.13 m
2017	Bolivarian Games	Santa Marta, Colombia	3rd	Shot put	17.78 m
2018	South American Games	Cochabamba, Bolivia	2nd	Shot put	18.33 m
2020	South American Indoor Championships	Cochabamba, Bolivia	3rd	Shot put	18.73 m
2021	South American Championships	Guayaquil, Ecuador	6th	Shot put	16.77 m
