= Athletics at the 2009 Bolivarian Games – Results =

These are the results of the athletics competition at the 2009 Bolivarian Games which took place between November 22 and November 26, 2009, in Sucre, Bolivia. Complete results could be retrieved for November 22, November 23, and November 24. For November 25 and 26, incomplete results were compiled from various sources.

== Men's results ==
=== 100 meters ===
Heat 1 – 22 November – Wind: -0.2 m/s

Rank	Lane	Name	Nationality	Time	Notes
1	3	Luis Morán	Ecuador	10.48	Q
2	4	Daniel Grueso	Colombia	10.57	Q
3	5	Ronald Amaya	Venezuela	10.61	Q
4	7	Andrés Carranza	Bolivia	11.01	q
5	6	Javier Valenzuela	Bolivia	11.12	

Heat 2 – 22 November – Wind: +0.1 m/s

Rank	Lane	Name	Nationality	Time	Notes
1	3	Diego Rivas	Venezuela	10.56	Q
2	5	Arturo Ramírez	Venezuela	10.75	Q
3	4	Franklin Nazareno	Ecuador	10.99	Q
4	6	Leonardo Camargo	Bolivia	11.07	q
5	7	Gerardo Correa	Ecuador	11.24	

Final – 23 November – Wind: +2.6 m/s

Rank	Lane	Name	Nationality	Time	Notes
1st place, gold medalist(s)	3	Daniel Grueso	Colombia	10.27 w	
2nd place, silver medalist(s)	2	Arturo Ramírez	Venezuela	10.28 w	
3rd place, bronze medalist(s)	4	Luis Morán	Ecuador	10.31 w	
4	5	Diego Rivas	Venezuela	10.50 w	
5	6	Ronald Amaya	Venezuela	10.51 w	
6	1	Leonardo Camargo	Bolivia	10.85 w	
7	8	Andrés Carranza	Bolivia	10.89 w	
	7	Franklin Nazareno	Ecuador		

=== 200 meters ===
Final – 25 November – Wind: +0.0 m/s

Rank	Name	Nationality	Time	Notes
1st place, gold medalist(s)	Arturo Ramírez	Venezuela	20.78	NJR
2nd place, silver medalist(s)	Daniel Grueso	Colombia	20.79	
3rd place, bronze medalist(s)	Lenin Cubillán	Venezuela	21.31	
4	Luis Morán	Ecuador	21.75	
5	Franklin Nazareno	Ecuador	21.89	

=== 400 meters ===
Final – 23 November

Rank	Lane	Name	Nationality	Time	Notes
1st place, gold medalist(s)	6	Alberto Aguilar	Venezuela	46.54	
2nd place, silver medalist(s)	3	Omar Longart	Venezuela	46.74	
3rd place, bronze medalist(s)	5	Freddy Mezones	Venezuela	46.97	
4	4	Geiner Mosquera	Colombia	47.56	
5	7	Lenin Flores	Ecuador	48.77	
6	2	Julio Alfredo Pérez	Peru	48.89	
7	1	Luis Covarrubias	Bolivia	49.98	
8	8	Luis Fernando Caicedo	Ecuador	50.72	

=== 800 meters ===
Final – 25 November

Rank	Name	Nationality	Time	Notes
1st place, gold medalist(s)	Nico Herrera	Venezuela	1:51.75	
2nd place, silver medalist(s)	Rafith Rodríguez	Colombia	1:55.37	
3rd place, bronze medalist(s)	Julio Alfredo Pérez	Peru	1:59.57	

=== 1500 meters ===
Final – 22 November

Rank	Name	Nationality	Time	Notes
1st place, gold medalist(s)	Bayron Piedra	Ecuador	3:50.53	
2nd place, silver medalist(s)	Nico Herrera	Venezuela	3:53.92	
3rd place, bronze medalist(s)	Mario Bazán	Peru	3:54.70	
4	Jefferson Peña	Colombia	3:59.49	

=== 5000 meters ===
Final – 25 November

Rank	Name	Nationality	Time	Notes
1st place, gold medalist(s)	Bayron Piedra	Ecuador	15:05.1	ht
2nd place, silver medalist(s)	Jhon Cusi	Peru	15:09.1	ht
3rd place, bronze medalist(s)	William Naranjo	Colombia	15:10.4	ht

=== 10,000 meters ===
Final – 23 November

Rank	Name	Nationality	Time	Notes
1st place, gold medalist(s)	Bayron Piedra	Ecuador	31.07.10	
2nd place, silver medalist(s)	William Naranjo	Colombia	31.18.45	
3rd place, bronze medalist(s)	Jorge Aruquipa	Bolivia	31.19.32	
4	Miguel Ángel Almachi	Ecuador	31.34.20	
	Jhon Cusi	Peru	DNF	
	Constantino León	Peru	DNF	

=== Half marathon ===
Final – 26 November

Rank	Name	Nationality	Time	Notes
1st place, gold medalist(s)	Diego Colorado	Colombia	1:09:35	
2nd place, silver medalist(s)	Celso Pillco	Bolivia	1:10:20	
3rd place, bronze medalist(s)	Franklin Tenorio	Ecuador	1:10:39	
4	Constantino León	Peru	1:11:59	

=== 3000 meters steeplechase ===
Final – 23 November

Rank	Name	Nationality	Time	Notes
1st place, gold medalist(s)	Mario Bazán	Peru	9:29.04	
2nd place, silver medalist(s)	Gerardo Villacrés	Ecuador	9:46.75	
3rd place, bronze medalist(s)	José Gregorio Peña	Venezuela	10:04.90	

=== 110 meters hurdles ===
Final – 23 November – Wind: +0.9 m/s

Rank	Lane	Name	Nationality	Time	Notes
1st place, gold medalist(s)	4	Paulo Villar	Colombia	13.64	
2nd place, silver medalist(s)	3	Jorge McFarlane	Peru	13.89	
3rd place, bronze medalist(s)	5	Albert Bravo	Venezuela	14.36	
4	6	Nelson Acebey	Bolivia	15.07	

=== 400 meters hurdles ===
Final – 25 November

Rank	Name	Nationality	Time	Notes
1st place, gold medalist(s)	Yeison Rivas	Colombia	50.67	
2nd place, silver medalist(s)	Víctor Solarte	Venezuela	51.83	
3rd place, bronze medalist(s)	Emerson Chalá	Ecuador	52.35	NJR

=== High jump ===
Final – 24 November

Rank	Name	Nationality	1.95	2.00	2.05	2.10	2.13	2.16	2.19	2.22	2.25	Result	Notes
1st place, gold medalist(s)	Albert Bravo	Venezuela	-	-	O	O	X-	XO	O	O	XXX	2.22	
2nd place, silver medalist(s)	Wanner Miller	Colombia	-	-	-	O	O	O	XO	O	XXX	2.22	
3rd place, bronze medalist(s)	Diego Ferrín	Ecuador	O	O	O	XXX						2.05	
3rd place, bronze medalist(s)	Arturo Chávez	Peru	O	O	O	XXX						2.05	

=== Pole vault ===
Final – 23 November

Rank	Name	Nationality	4.60	4.70	4.80	4.85	4.90	4.95	5.00	5.05	5.10	5.20	Result	Notes
1st place, gold medalist(s)	Víctor Medina	Colombia	O	O	XO	-	O	-	-	-	XXO	XX-	5.10	
2nd place, silver medalist(s)	César González	Venezuela	O	XO	O	-	XXX						4.80	
	Óscar Mina	Ecuador											DNS	

=== Long jump ===
Final – 23 November

Rank	Name	Nationality	#1	#2	#3	#4	#5	#6	Result	Notes
1st place, gold medalist(s)	Víctor Castillo	Venezuela	7.65 (+0.7 m/s)	8.25 (-0.6 m/s)	8.20 (-0.2 m/s)	-	8.20 (+1.3 m/s)	-	8.25 (-0.6 m/s)	GR
2nd place, silver medalist(s)	Hugo Chila	Ecuador	7.62 (-2.6 m/s)	X (-0.6 m/s)	X (-0.6 m/s)	7.83 (-1.0 m/s)	X (+0.0 m/s)	8.16 (-0.0 m/s)	8.16 (-0.0 m/s)	
3rd place, bronze medalist(s)	Jorge McFarlane	Peru	8.10 (+0.7 m/s)	7.82 (-2.0 m/s)	X (-0.5 m/s)	7.72 (-2.5 m/s)	X (-0.0 m/s)	7.53 (-0.2 m/s)	8.10 (+0.7 m/s)	
4	Fabián Padrón	Venezuela	7.55 (-0.2 m/s)	7.37 (-0.7 m/s)	X (-0.6 m/s)	X (-6.3 m/s)	7.57 (-0.9 m/s)	7.36 (+0.3 m/s)	7.57 (-0.9 m/s)	
5	Hamid Chipunavi	Bolivia	X (-0.0 m/s)	6.97 (-4.1 m/s)	X (-1.1 m/s)	X (-4.4 m/s)	X (-0.6 m/s)	6.91 (-2 m/s)	6.97 (-4.1 m/s)	
6	Miguel Alfaro	Bolivia	6.46 (-0.3 m/s)	6.73 (-0.4 m/s)	6.49 (+0.9 m/s)	6.46 (-0.8 m/s)	6.73 (-1.9 m/s)	6.56 (-4.3 m/s)	6.73 (-0.4 m/s)	
7	José Sornoza	Ecuador	X (+2.0 m/s)	5.53 (-3.1 m/s)	X (-0.7 m/s)	-	-	-	5.53 (-3.1 m/s)	
8	Nelson Acebey	Bolivia	X (+0.9 m/s)	X (-1.6 m/s)	X (-1.0 m/s)	-	-	-	NM	
	Diego Ferrín	Ecuador							DNS	

=== Triple jump ===
Final – 25 November

Rank	Name	Nationality	Result	Notes
1st place, gold medalist(s)	Hugo Chila	Ecuador	17.03 (+0.3 m/s)	GR, NR
2nd place, silver medalist(s)	Jhon Murillo	Colombia	16.20 (+0.5 m/s)	
3rd place, bronze medalist(s)	José Sornoza	Ecuador	16.03 (+0.0 m/s)	NYR
4	Fabián Padrón	Venezuela	15.53 (-0.3 m/s)	
5	Iván Ortiz	Bolivia	14.61 (+0.1 m/s)	NJR

=== Shot put ===
Final – 25 November

Rank	Name	Nationality	Result	Notes
1st place, gold medalist(s)	Eder Moreno	Colombia	18.29	
2nd place, silver medalist(s)	Yojer Medina	Venezuela	17.56	
3rd place, bronze medalist(s)	Jesús Parejo	Venezuela	17.54	
4	Michael Putman	Peru	17.03	
5	Javier Nieto	Peru	16.97	
6	Aldo González	Bolivia	16.93	
7	Josner Ortiz	Venezuela	16.90	
8	Julio César Londoño	Colombia	16.27	

=== Discus throw ===
Final – 24 November

Rank	Name	Nationality	#1	#2	#3	#4	#5	#6	Result	Notes
1st place, gold medalist(s)	Jesús Parejo	Venezuela	53.08	55.98	55.53	54.04	55.32	55.47	55.98	
2nd place, silver medalist(s)	Julio César Londoño	Colombia	X	53.89	X	53.48	X	53.00	53.89	
3rd place, bronze medalist(s)	Michael Putman	Peru	X	48.22	52.97	52.78	52.11	53.31	53.31	
4	Jorge Olmos	Bolivia	48.29	48.81	48.73	46.66	46.65	48.51	48.81	
5	Juan Aguilera	Ecuador	X	X	X	X	48.57	48.37	48.57	
6	Josner Ortiz	Venezuela	40.74	44.64	43.39	42.28	-	-	44.64	

=== Hammer throw ===
Final – 22 November

Rank	Name	Nationality	#1	#2	#3	#4	#5	#6	Result	Notes
1st place, gold medalist(s)	Aldo Bello	Venezuela	64.07	64.79	62.29	63.99	X	63.51	64.79	
2nd place, silver medalist(s)	Pedro Múñoz	Venezuela	X	61.00	X	X	61.40	62.73	62.73	
3rd place, bronze medalist(s)	Guillermo Braulio	Ecuador	55.22	X	57.71	X	X	57.23	57.71	
4	Jesús Parejo	Venezuela	56.50	X	X	56.50	56.80	X	56.80	
5	Eder Moreno	Colombia	23.05	-	-	-	-		23.05	

=== Javelin throw ===
Final – 25 November

Rank	Name	Nationality	Result	Notes
1st place, gold medalist(s)	Dairon Márquez	Colombia	73.70	
2nd place, silver medalist(s)	Noraldo Palacios	Colombia	71.64	
3rd place, bronze medalist(s)	Jhonatan Davis	Venezuela	56.29	

=== Decathlon ===
Final – 22/23 November

The highest mark recorded in each event is highlighted in yellow

Rank	Name	Nationality	100m	LJ	SP	HJ	400m	110m H	DT	PV	JT	1500m	Points	Notes
1st place, gold medalist(s)	William Valor	Venezuela	10.94 (0.0 m/s); 874	7.01 (0.4 m/s); 816	12.93 663	1.95 758	49.44 841	14.77 (0.1 m/s); 878	37.43 613	4.30 702	57.69 703	5:13.87 482	7330	GR
2nd place, silver medalist(s)	Jhonatan Davis	Venezuela	11.05 (0.0 m/s); 850	7.09 (0.5 m/s); 835	13.20 679	1.95 758	49.21 851	14.23 (0.1 m/s); 945	31.63 497	3.70 535	62.65 778	5:01.15 553	7281	
3rd place, bronze medalist(s)	Óscar Mina	Ecuador	10.87 (0.0 m/s); 890	6.84 (0.4 m/s); 776	12.83 657	1.89 705	50.73 781	16.32 (0.1 m/s); 697	39.27 650	3.60 509	43.52 493	5:17.50 463	6621	
4	Andrés Mantilla	Colombia	11.27 (0.0 m/s); 801	6.67 (0.2 m/s); 736	14.01 729	1.89 705	53.62 655	14.88 (0.1 m/s); 864	39.89 662	3.70 535	48.62 568	5:37.89 361	6616	
5	Vitorio Gotuzzo	Peru	11.30 (0.0 m/s); 795	6.89 (0.8 m/s); 788	11.78 593	1.92 731	51.35 753	16.19 (0.1 m/s); 711	34.86 561	3.60 509	43.15 488	5:00.27 558	6487	

=== 20 kilometers walk ===
Final – 22 November

Rank	Name	Nationality	Time	Notes
1st place, gold medalist(s)	Luis Fernando López	Colombia	1.28.09	
2nd place, silver medalist(s)	Rolando Saquipay	Ecuador	1.32.06	
3rd place, bronze medalist(s)	Mauricio Arteaga	Ecuador	1.37.07	
	Pavel Chihuán	Peru	DNF	

=== 50 kilometers walk ===
Final – 25 November

Rank	Name	Nationality	Time	Notes
1st place, gold medalist(s)	Mesías Zapata	Ecuador	4:24:07	
2nd place, silver medalist(s)	Néstor Rueda	Colombia	4:25:27	
3rd place, bronze medalist(s)	Washington Guevara	Ecuador	4:36:22	

=== 4 x 100 meters relay ===
Final – 23 November

Rank	Nation	Competitors	Time	Notes
1st place, gold medalist(s)	Colombia	Jhon Murillo; Jhon Valoyes; Paulo Villar; Daniel Grueso	39.25	GR
2nd place, silver medalist(s)	Venezuela	Víctor Castillo; Arturo Ramírez; Diego Rivas; Ronald Amaya	39.74	
3rd place, bronze medalist(s)	Ecuador	Luis Morán; Franklin Nazareno; Óscar Mina; Hugo Chila	39.80	
4	Bolivia	Jhaffar Vidovic; Leonardo Camargo; Javier Valenzuela; Andrés Carranza	40.80	

=== 4 x 400 meters relay ===
Final – 25 November

Rank	Nation	Competitors	Time	Notes
1st place, gold medalist(s)	Venezuela	Freddy Mezones; Omar Longart; Alberto Aguilar; Albert Bravo	3:06.91	
2nd place, silver medalist(s)	Colombia	Juan Pablo Maturana; Geiner Mosquera; Yeison Rivas; Jhon Valoyes	3:10.93	
3rd place, bronze medalist(s)	Ecuador	Emerson Chalá; Gerardo Correa; Luis Fernando Caicedo; Lenin Flores	3:19.29	

== Women's results ==
=== 100 meters ===
Heat 1 – 22 November – Wind: +0.5 m/s

Rank	Lane	Name	Nationality	Time	Notes
1	4	Darlenis Obregón	Colombia	11.77	Q
2	3	Nancy Garcés	Venezuela	11.97	Q
2	6	Liliana Núñez	Ecuador	11.97	Q
4	5	Nelcy Caicedo	Colombia	12.06	q
5	7	Carla Mercado	Bolivia	12.50	q

Heat 2 – 22 November – Wind: +0.0 m/s

Rank	Lane	Name	Nationality	Time	Notes
1	5	Prisciliana Chourio	Venezuela	11.65	Q
2	4	Yomara Hinestroza	Colombia	12.08	Q
3	3	Germania Caicedo	Ecuador	12.10	Q
4	7	Maira Cano	Bolivia	12.54	
5	6	Lupita Rojas	Bolivia	13.53	

Final – 23 November – Wind: +2.7 m/s

Rank	Lane	Name	Nationality	Time	Notes
1st place, gold medalist(s)	5	Darlenis Obregón	Colombia	11.44 w	
2nd place, silver medalist(s)	4	Prisciliana Chourio	Venezuela	11.59 w	
3rd place, bronze medalist(s)	2	Nelcy Caicedo	Colombia	11.75 w	
4	3	Nancy Garcés	Venezuela	11.81 w	
5	7	Yomara Hinestroza	Colombia	11.86 w	
6	6	Liliana Núñez	Ecuador	11.96 w	
7	8	Germania Caicedo	Ecuador	12.09 w	
8	1	Carla Mercado	Bolivia	12.32 w	

=== 200 meters ===
Heat 1 – 24 November – Wind: -2.3 m/s

Rank	Lane	Name	Nationality	Time	Notes
1	4	Norma González	Colombia	23.78	Q
2	5	Érika Chávez	Ecuador	23.99	Q
3	6	Wilmary Álvarez	Venezuela	24.20	Q
4	3	Prisciliana Chourio	Venezuela	24.26	q
5	2	Leslie Arnez	Bolivia	25.22	
6	7	Maira Cano	Bolivia	25.42	

Heat 2 – 24 November – Wind: -0.1 m/s

Rank	Lane	Name	Nationality	Time	Notes
1	4	Darlenis Obregón	Colombia	23.77	Q
2	2	Nancy Garcés	Venezuela	24.43	Q
3	6	Liliana Núñez	Ecuador	24.50	Q
4	5	Germania Caicedo	Ecuador	24.60	q
5	7	Marysabel Romero	Bolivia	24.87	

Final – 25 November – Wind: +0.1 m/s

Rank	Name	Nationality	Time	Notes
1st place, gold medalist(s)	Darlenis Obregón	Colombia	23.19	
2nd place, silver medalist(s)	Norma González	Colombia	23.50	
3rd place, bronze medalist(s)	Érika Chávez	Ecuador	23.65	NJR
4	Wilmary Álvarez	Venezuela	23.95	
5	Prisciliana Chourio	Venezuela	23.97	PB

=== 400 meters ===
Heat 1 – 22 November

Rank	Lane	Name	Nationality	Time	Notes
1	5	Lucy Jaramillo	Ecuador	53.53	Q
2	4	Jennifer Padilla	Colombia	54.14	Q
3	3	Wilmary Álvarez	Venezuela	54.52	Q
4	6	Daisy Ugarte	Bolivia	55.23	q
5	2	Ydanis Navas	Venezuela	55.32	q
6	7	Leslie Arnez	Bolivia	56.11	

Heat 2 – 22 November

Rank	Lane	Name	Nationality	Time	Notes
1	5	Érika Chávez	Ecuador	55.43	Q
2	4	Kelly López	Colombia	55.47	Q
3	6	Alison Sánchez	Bolivia	55.98	Q
4	2	Claudia Meneses	Peru	56.39	
5	3	Magdalena Mendoza	Venezuela	56.56	
6	7	Liliana Núñez	Ecuador	57.66	

Final – 25 November

Rank	Lane	Name	Nationality	Time	Notes
1st place, gold medalist(s)	3	Lucy Jaramillo	Ecuador	52.9	ht
2nd place, silver medalist(s)	4	Jennifer Padilla	Colombia	53.9	ht
3rd place, bronze medalist(s)	5	Wilmary Álvarez	Venezuela	54.0	ht
4	8	Kelly López	Colombia	55.0	ht
5	7	Érika Chávez	Ecuador	55.5	ht
6	1	Alison Sánchez	Bolivia	56.2	ht
7	6	Daisy Ugarte	Bolivia	56.3	ht
8	2	Ydanis Navas	Venezuela	56.5	ht

=== 800 meters ===
Final – 25 November

Rank	Name	Nationality	Time	Notes
1st place, gold medalist(s)	Rosibel García	Colombia	2:10.00	
2nd place, silver medalist(s)	Muriel Coneo	Colombia	2:10.66	
3rd place, bronze medalist(s)	Daisy Ugarte	Bolivia	2:10.87	

=== 1500 meters ===
Final – 22 November

Rank	Name	Nationality	Time	Notes
1st place, gold medalist(s)	Rosibel García	Colombia	4:45.66	
2nd place, silver medalist(s)	Muriel Coneo	Colombia	4:45.96	
3rd place, bronze medalist(s)	Viviana Acosta	Ecuador	4:46.75	
4	Rocío Huillca	Peru	4:50.35	
5	Marlene Acuña	Ecuador	4:52.90	

=== 5000 meters ===
Final – 23 November

Rank	Name	Nationality	Time	Notes
1st place, gold medalist(s)	Inés Melchor	Peru	17:42.95	
2nd place, silver medalist(s)	Julia Rivera	Peru	17:57.05	
3rd place, bronze medalist(s)	Rosa Chacha	Ecuador	18:32.04	
4	María Montilla	Venezuela	18:58.09	
5	Viviana Acosta	Ecuador	19:18.55	
6	Bertha Sánchez	Colombia	19:23.49	

=== 10,000 meters ===
Final – 25 November

Rank	Name	Nationality	Time	Notes
1st place, gold medalist(s)	Inés Melchor	Peru	36:00.62	
2nd place, silver medalist(s)	Rosa Chacha	Ecuador	36:54.21	
3rd place, bronze medalist(s)	Rosmery Quispe	Bolivia	38:12.31	
4	María Montilla	Venezuela	38:36.74	

=== Half marathon ===
Final – 26 November

Rank	Name	Nationality	Time	Notes
1st place, gold medalist(s)	Jimena Misayauri	Peru	1:20:45	
2nd place, silver medalist(s)	Yolanda Fernández	Colombia	1:21:42	
3rd place, bronze medalist(s)	Nelby Sánchez	Bolivia	1:24:46	
4	Julia Rivera	Peru		

=== 3000 meters steeplechase ===
Final – 24 November

Rank	Name	Nationality	Time	Notes
1st place, gold medalist(s)	Ángela Figueroa	Colombia	11:06.48	
2nd place, silver medalist(s)	Marlene Acuña	Ecuador	11:25.92	
3rd place, bronze medalist(s)	Rocío Huillca	Peru	12:10.71	
4	Hilaria Patzi	Bolivia	12:30.24	

=== 100 meters hurdles ===
Final – 23 November – Wind: -0.1 m/s

Rank	Lane	Name	Nationality	Time	Notes
1st place, gold medalist(s)	4	Briggite Merlano	Colombia	13.35	
2nd place, silver medalist(s)	5	Lina Flórez	Colombia	13.43	
3rd place, bronze medalist(s)	6	Ada Hernández	Venezuela	14.16	
4	3	María Ruíz	Ecuador	14.66	

=== 400 meters hurdles ===
Final – 25 November

Rank	Name	Nationality	Time	Notes
1st place, gold medalist(s)	Lucy Jaramillo	Ecuador	57.77	
2nd place, silver medalist(s)	Princesa Oliveros	Colombia	58.21	
3rd place, bronze medalist(s)	Magdalena Mendoza	Venezuela	60.44	
4	Claudia Meneses	Peru	61.44	NR
5	Adriana Mejía	Bolivia	65.37	
	Alison Sánchez	Bolivia	DNF	

=== High jump ===
Final – 23 November

Rank	Name	Nationality	1.60	1.65	1.70	1.73	1.76	1.80	Result	Notes
1st place, gold medalist(s)	Caterine Ibargüen	Colombia	-	O	O	O	O	XO	1.80	
2nd place, silver medalist(s)	Gabriela Saravia	Peru	O	O	XO	XO	XXX		1.73	
3rd place, bronze medalist(s)	Guillercy González	Venezuela	XO	XXX					1.60	

=== Pole vault ===
Final – 22 November

Rank	Name	Nationality	3.60	3.70	3.80	3.85	3.90	3.95	4.00	4.05	4.10	Result	Notes
1st place, gold medalist(s)	Keisa Monterola	Venezuela	O	-	O	-	O	-	O	-	XXX	4.00	
2nd place, silver medalist(s)	Milena Agudelo	Colombia	-	-	XO	-	O	-	O	-	XXX	4.00	
	María Ruíz	Ecuador										DNS	

=== Long jump ===
Final – 22 November

Rank	Name	Nationality	#1	#2	#3	#4	#5	#6	Result	Notes
1st place, gold medalist(s)	Caterine Ibargüen	Colombia	X w (+2.3 m/s)	X (-0.2 m/s)	6.20 (-0.5 m/s)	6.32 (-0.4 m/s)	X (-0.1 m/s)	-	6.32 (-0.4 m/s)	
2nd place, silver medalist(s)	Verónica Davis	Venezuela	X (+1.8 m/s)	X w (+2.2 m/s)	X (-0.2 m/s)	6.14 (-1.0 m/s)	X (-0.8 m/s)	X (-0.2 m/s)	6.14 (-1.0 m/s)	
3rd place, bronze medalist(s)	Munich Tovar	Venezuela	6.10 w (+2.6 m/s)	X (-0.2 m/s)	5.7 (+0.2 m/s)	5.74 (-0.0 m/s)	5.58 w (+2.4 m/s)	5.66 (-0.5 m/s)	6.10 w (+2.6 m/s)	
4	Lindy Cavero	Bolivia	X (+1.1 m/s)	X (+0.9 m/s)	X (-2.9 m/s)	X (-0.7 m/s)	5.69 (+0.8 m/s)	X (-0.3 m/s)	5.69 (+0.8 m/s)	
5	Maitté Zamorano	Bolivia	X (-0.2 m/s)	X w (+2.2 m/s)	X (-1.1 m/s)	X (-0.3 m/s)	X (-0.0 m/s)	X (+0.1 m/s)	NM	

=== Triple jump ===
Final – 24 November

Rank	Name	Nationality	#1	#2	#3	#4	#5	#6	Result	Notes
1st place, gold medalist(s)	Verónica Davis	Venezuela	13.80 (-1.1 m/s)	13.97 (-0.4 m/s)	13.52 (-0.5 m/s)	-	-	13.87 (+0.8 m/s)	13.97 (-0.4 m/s)	GR
2nd place, silver medalist(s)	Caterine Ibargüen	Colombia	13.70 (-1.0 m/s)	X (-1.2 m/s)	13.79 (-2.3 m/s)	X (+0.0 m/s)	X (-0.7 m/s)	13.96 (-0.3 m/s)	13.96 (-0.3 m/s)	
3rd place, bronze medalist(s)	Munich Tovar	Venezuela	12.39 (+1.3 m/s)	-	-	-	12.68 (-3.2 m/s)	12.87 (-1.2 m/s)	12.87 (-1.2 m/s)	
4	Lindy Cavero	Bolivia	X (-0.3 m/s)	12.06 (-0.6 m/s)	-	-	-	12.41 (-2.8 m/s)	12.41 (-2.8 m/s)	

=== Shot put ===
Final – 22 November

Rank	Name	Nationality	#1	#2	#3	#4	#5	#6	Result	Notes
1st place, gold medalist(s)	Luz Dary Castro	Colombia	15.58	16.20	X	16.37	16.00	X	16.37	
2nd place, silver medalist(s)	Ahymará Espinoza	Venezuela	15.09	15.83	16.03	16.08	16.32	X	16.32	
3rd place, bronze medalist(s)	Rosa Rodríguez	Venezuela	13.50	14.32	13.97	X	14.04	X	14.32	
4	María Cubillán	Venezuela	13.31	13.65	14.03	13.76	13.47	X	14.03	
5	Maitté Zamorano	Bolivia	9.13	-	-				9.13	

=== Discus throw ===
Final – 25 November

Rank	Name	Nationality	Result	Notes
1st place, gold medalist(s)	María Cubillán	Venezuela	51.04	
2nd place, silver medalist(s)	Luz Dary Castro	Colombia	49.66	
3rd place, bronze medalist(s)	Rosa Rodríguez	Venezuela	39.72	

=== Hammer throw ===
Final – 23 November

Rank	Name	Nationality	#1	#2	#3	#4	#5	#6	Result	Notes
1st place, gold medalist(s)	Eli Johana Moreno	Colombia	69.65	X	X	69.04	X	67.21	69.65	GR
2nd place, silver medalist(s)	Rosa Rodríguez	Venezuela	66.43	X	66.21	X	X	66.98	66.98	
3rd place, bronze medalist(s)	Zuleyma Mina	Ecuador	X	X	X	51.93	53.36	X	53.36	

=== Javelin throw ===
Final – 22 November

Rank	Name	Nationality	#1	#2	#3	#4	#5	#6	Result	Notes
1st place, gold medalist(s)	Zuleima Araméndiz	Colombia	51.81	47.71	49.89	-	X	48.74	51.81	
2nd place, silver medalist(s)	Thaimara Rivas	Venezuela	38.93	39.94	37.96	41.40	40.44	40.16	41.40	
3rd place, bronze medalist(s)	Rubi Mercado	Ecuador	X	40.22	X	X	41.18	38.30	41.18	

=== Heptathlon ===
Final – 24/25 November

The highest mark recorded in each event is highlighted in yellow

Rank	Name	Nationality	100m H	HJ	SP	200m	LJ	JT	800m	Points	Notes
1st place, gold medalist(s)	Thaimara Rivas	Venezuela	14.54 (0.1 m/s); 903	1.60 736	13.28 746	26.00 (-0.3 m/s); 797	5.56 (0.0 m/s)	39.95	2:39.65	5142	
2nd place, silver medalist(s)	Guillercy González	Venezuela	14.80 (0.1 m/s); 868	1.60 736	10.04 532	26.29 (-0.3 m/s); 772				4809	
3rd place, bronze medalist(s)	Nasil Perea	Colombia	15.30 (0.1 m/s); 802	1.63 771	11.56 632	27.45 (-0.3 m/s); 675				4682	
4	Lindy Cavero	Bolivia	16.35 (0.1 m/s); 672	1.51 632	8.85 454	26.56 (-0.3 m/s); 749					
5	Maitté Zamorano	Bolivia	17.49 (0.1 m/s); 542							DNF	

=== 20 kilometers walk ===
Final – 25 November

Rank	Name	Nationality	Time	Notes
1st place, gold medalist(s)	Johana Ordóñez	Ecuador	1:44.37	
2nd place, silver medalist(s)	Geovana Irusta	Bolivia	1:44.38	
3rd place, bronze medalist(s)	Sandra Zapata	Colombia	1:47.12	

=== 4 x 100 meters relay ===
Final – 23 November

Rank	Nation	Competitors	Time	Notes
1st place, gold medalist(s)	Colombia	Nelcy Caicedo; Darlenys Obregón; Lina Flórez; Brigitte Merlano	43.96	
2nd place, silver medalist(s)	Venezuela	Nercely Soto; Prisciliana Chourio; Lexabeth Hidalgo; Nancy Garcés	44.98	
3rd place, bronze medalist(s)	Ecuador	Germania Caicedo; Lucy Jaramillo; Érika Chávez; Liliana Núñez	46.28	
4	Bolivia	Marysabel Romero; Leslie Arnez; Maira Cano; Carla Mercado	46.96	

=== 4 x 400 meters relay ===
Final – 25 November

Rank	Nation	Competitors	Time	Notes
1st place, gold medalist(s)	Colombia	Kelly López; Darlenys Obregón; Jennifer Padilla; Muriel Coneo	3:39.06	
2nd place, silver medalist(s)	Venezuela	Yenny Mejías; Ydanis Navas; Magdalena Mendoza; Wilmary Álvarez	3:40.57	
3rd place, bronze medalist(s)	Ecuador	Érika Chávez; María Corozo; Liliana Núñez; Lucy Jaramillo	3:41.42	NR
4	Bolivia	Marysabel Romero; Leslie Arnez; Daisy Ugarte; Alison Sánchez	3:42.11	
