= Darlenys Obregón =

Colombian sprinter (born 1986)

Personal information
- Full name: Darlenys Obregón Mulato
- Born: 21 February 1986 (age 40) Puerto Tejada, Cauca, Colombia
- Height: 1.68 m (5 ft 6 in)
- Weight: 58 kg (128 lb)

Sport
- Country: Colombia
- Sport: Women's Athletics
- Event: Sprint
Medal record
Women's athletics
Representing Colombia
CAC Games
| Gold medal – first place | 2010 Mayagüez | 4×100 m relay |
| Silver medal – second place | 2006 Cartagena | 4×100 m relay |
| Silver medal – second place | 2010 Mayagüez | 4×400 m relay |
| Bronze medal – third place | 2010 Mayagüez | 200 m |
Bolivarian Games
| Gold medal – first place | 2005 Armenia | 4x100 m relay |
| Gold medal – first place | 2009 Sucre | 100 m |
| Gold medal – first place | 2009 Sucre | 200 m |
| Gold medal – first place | 2009 Sucre | 4x100 m relay |
| Gold medal – first place | 2009 Sucre | 4x400 m relay |
South American Championships
| Silver medal – second place | 2006 Tunja | 200 m |
| Silver medal – second place | 2006 Tunja | 4×100 m relay |
| Bronze medal – third place | 2006 Tunja | 100 m |
- Updated on 29 December 2014

Darlenys Obregón Mulato (born 21 February 1986) is a Colombian track and field athlete who competes in the sprinting events, primarily the 200 metres in which she has a personal best of 23.09 seconds. She represented her country at the 2008 Summer Olympics and the 2012 Summer Olympics and is a three-time participant in the World Championships in Athletics (2005, 2009, 2011).

She won regional medals as a junior and was a double medalist in the sprints at the 2006 South American Championships. She is a frequent member of the Colombian 4×100 metres relay team and helped set the national record of 43.03 seconds at the 2005 World Championships. At the 2010 CAC Games she won three medals for Colombia, two in the relays and one in the 200 m bronze.

== Career ==
Born in Puerto Tejada, Cauca, Obregón began representing Colombia as a teenager and won her first international medals (silvers over 100 metres and 200 metres) at the 2002 South American Youth Championships. She was fifth in the 200 m at the South American Junior Athletics Championships the following year and also competed on the world stage at the 2003 World Youth Championships in Athletics, where she came seventh in the 200 m final. She stepped up an age category for the South American Under-23 Athletics Championships and won the 200 m gold medal. She also ran personal bests of 11.69 seconds for the 100 m and 23.35 seconds over 200 m.

The 2005 season saw her progress into the senior ranks. She was the 100 m bronze medallist at the 2005 Pan American Junior Athletics Championships and went on to win the Colombian senior national title in the 200 m. As a result, she was chosen for the 4×100 metres relay team at the 2005 World Championships in Athletics. The Colombian women ran a national record of 43.03 seconds in the heats to progress as the fastest non-qualifying team and then finished sixth in the final.

She won her first senior international medals the following year, starting with a 200 m silver and relay bronze at the 2006 Ibero-American Championships, then a relay silver at the 2006 Central American and Caribbean Games. Obregón established herself at continental level with silver medals in the 200 m and relay at the 2006 South American Championships in Athletics, as well as a 100 m bronze medal. She was a participant at the 2007 Pan American Games, but did not progress past the 200 m semi-finals. The following June, she won the 200 m and 4×100 m relay titles at the 2008 Ibero-American Championships before going on to set a personal best of 23.09 seconds at the 2008 Central American and Caribbean Championships, where she won the 200 m bronze and relay silver. She was selected to represent her country at the 2008 Summer Olympics and the 22-year-old reached the quarter-finals of the 200 m.

At the 2009 CAC Championships, she helped the Colombian team including Yomara Hinestroza, Felipa Palacios and Norma González to the silver medal in the relay. She ran the B standard for the 2009 World Championships in Athletics, but did not make it past the heats stage of the 200 m. She fared better in the relay, where the Colombian team reached their second consecutive world final, although their finishing time of 43.71 seconds left them in last place. At the 2010 Central American and Caribbean Games she won three medals for Colombia by taking the 200 m bronze, the 4×100 m relay gold medal and also a 4×400 m relay silver medal.

== Personal bests ==
- 100 m: 11.54 s (wind: +0.4 m/s) – Bogotá, Colombia, 13 August 2011
- 200 m: 23.09 s (wind: +0.1 m/s) – Cali, Colombia, 5 July 2008
- 400 m: 52.78 s – Cali, Colombia, 26 November 2008

== International competitions ==
| Year | Competition | Venue | Position | Event | Notes |
Representing Colombia
| 2002 | South American Youth Championships | Asunción, Paraguay | 2nd | 100 m | 12.23 s (-0.7 m/s) |
| 2002 | South American Youth Championships | Asunción, Paraguay | 2nd | 200 m | 24.44 s (+3.3 m/s) w |
| 2002 | South American Youth Championships | Asunción, Paraguay | 2nd | 4x100 m relay | 47.3 s |
| 2002 | South American Youth Championships | Asunción, Paraguay | 1st | 1000 m medley relay | 2:13.94 min |
| 2003 | South American Junior Championships | Guayaquil, Ecuador | 5th | 200 m | 24.43 (NWI) |
| 2003 | World Youth Championships | Sherbrooke, Canada | 5th (sf) | 100 m | 11.95 (+1.9 m/s) |
| 2003 | World Youth Championships | Sherbrooke, Canada | 7th | 200 m | 24.43 (-1.4 m/s) |
| 2004 | South American U23 Championships | Barquisimeto, Venezuela | 1st | 200m | 23.76 (0.0 m/s) |
| 2004 | South American U23 Championships | Barquisimeto, Venezuela | 1st | 4x100m relay | 43.46 |
| 2005 | South American Championships | Cali, Colombia | 4th | 200 m | 23.18 w (+5.0 m/s) |
| 2005 | South American Championships | Cali, Colombia | 1st | 4×100 m relay | 43.17 |
| 2005 | Pan American Junior Championships | Windsor, Canada | 3rd | 100 m | 11.82 (-1.8 m/s) |
| 2005 | Pan American Junior Championships | Windsor, Canada | 5th | 200 m | 23.57 (+2.0 m/s) |
| 2005 | World Championships | Helsinki, Finland | 6th | 4×100 m relay | 43.07 |
| 2005 | Bolivarian Games | Armenia, Colombia | 3rd (no medal) | 200 m | 23.10 s (+0.7 m/s) A |
| 2005 | Bolivarian Games | Armenia, Colombia | 1st | 4x100 m relay | 45.61 s A |
| 2006 | Ibero-American Championships | Ponce, Puerto Rico | 2nd | 200 m | 23.23 (+0.7 m/s) |
| 2006 | Ibero-American Championships | Ponce, Puerto Rico | 3rd | 4×100 m relay | 44.79 |
| 2006 | Ibero-American Championships | Ponce, Puerto Rico | 2nd | 4×400 m relay | 3:37.71 |
| 2006 | Central American and Caribbean Games | Cartagena, Colombia | 7th | 200 m | 23.80 (-0.5 m/s) |
| 2006 | Central American and Caribbean Games | Cartagena, Colombia | 2nd | 4×100 m relay | 44.32 |
| 2006 | South American Championships | Tunja, Colombia | 3rd | 100 m | 11.72 (-2.1 m/s) |
| 2006 | South American Championships | Tunja, Colombia | 2nd | 200 m | 23.58 (-2.5 m/s) |
| 2006 | South American Championships | Tunja, Colombia | 2nd | 4×100 m relay | 44.78 |
| 2006 | South American U23 Championships / South American Games | Buenos Aires, Argentina | 1st | 100m | 11.73 (+1.9 m/s) |
| 2006 | South American U23 Championships / South American Games | Buenos Aires, Argentina | 1st | 200m | 23.23 (+1.7 m/s) |
| 2006 | South American U23 Championships / South American Games | Buenos Aires, Argentina | 1st | 4x100m relay | 45.14 |
| 2006 | South American U23 Championships / South American Games | Buenos Aires, Argentina | 2nd | 4x400m relay | 3:41.92 |
| 2007 | Pan American Games | Rio de Janeiro, Brazil | 13th (sf) | 200 m | 23.76 (+0.7 m/s) |
| 2007 | Pan American Games | Rio de Janeiro, Brazil | 8th (h) | 4×100 m relay | 44.53 |
| 2008 | Ibero-American Championships | Iquique, Chile | 1st | 200 m | 23.84 (-0.5 m/s) |
| 2008 | Ibero-American Championships | Iquique, Chile | 1st | 4×100 m relay | 44.89 |
| 2008 | Central American and Caribbean Championships | Cali, Colombia | 3rd | 200 m | 23.13 (+0.3 m/s) |
| 2008 | Central American and Caribbean Championships | Cali, Colombia | 2nd | 4×100 m relay | 43.56 |
| 2008 | Olympic Games | Beijing, China | 25th (qf) | 200 m | 23.40 (wind: +0.0 m/s) |
| 2009 | South American Championships | Lima, Peru | 1st | 4×100 m relay | 44.18 |
| 2009 | Central American and Caribbean Championships | Havana, Cuba | 2nd | 4×100 m relay | 43.67 |
| 2009 | World Championships | Berlin, Germany | 27th (h) | 200 m | 23.42 (+0.3 m/s) |
| 2009 | World Championships | Berlin, Germany | 8th | 4×100 m relay | 43.71 |
| 2009 | Bolivarian Games | Sucre, Bolivia | 1st | 100 m | 11.44 s A |
| 2009 | Bolivarian Games | Sucre, Bolivia | 1st | 200 m | 23.19 s A |
| 2009 | Bolivarian Games | Sucre, Bolivia | 1st | 4x100 m relay | 43.96 s A |
| 2009 | Bolivarian Games | Sucre, Bolivia | 1st | 4x400 m relay | 3:39.06 min A |
| 2010 | Ibero-American Championships | San Fernando, Spain | 5th | 200 m | 24.22 (+0.5 m/s) |
| 2010 | Ibero-American Championships | San Fernando, Spain | 2nd | 4×100 m relay | 44.29 |
| 2010 | Ibero-American Championships | San Fernando, Spain | 5th | 4×400 m relay | 3:38.94 |
| 2010 | Central American and Caribbean Games | Mayagüez, Puerto Rico | 3rd | 200 m | 23.76 (-0.9 m/s) |
| 2010 | Central American and Caribbean Games | Mayagüez, Puerto Rico | 1st | 4×100 m relay | 43.63 |
| 2010 | Central American and Caribbean Games | Mayagüez, Puerto Rico | 2nd | 4×400 m relay | 3:33.03 |
| 2011 | Central American and Caribbean Championships | Mayagüez, Puerto Rico | 4th | 4×100 m relay | 43.92 |
| 2011 | World Championships | Daegu, South Korea | 9th (h) | 4×100 m relay | 43.53 |
| 2011 | Pan American Games | Guadalajara, Mexico | 8th | 200 m | 23.64 (+0.5 m/s) |
| 2012 | Ibero-American Championships | Barquisimeto, Venezuela | 6th | 200 m | 23.59 (+0.6 m/s) |
| 2012 | Ibero-American Championships | Barquisimeto, Venezuela | 3rd | 4×100 m relay | 44.42 |
| 2012 | Olympic Games | London, United Kingdom | 11th (h) | 4×100 m relay | 43.21 |
| 2013 | World Championships | Moscow, Russia | 15th (h) | 4×100 m relay | 43.65 |
| 2013 | Bolivarian Games | Trujillo, Peru | 4th | 200 m | 23.78 (+0.0 m/s) |
| 2013 | Bolivarian Games | Trujillo, Peru | 1st | 4×100 m relay | 43.90 |
| 2014 | South American Games | Santiago, Chile | 1st (h)^{1} | 200 m | 23.91 (-0.2 m/s) |
| 2014 | Central American and Caribbean Games | Xalapa, Mexico | 13th (h) | 200 m | 24.58 A (+0.1 m/s) |
| 2014 | Central American and Caribbean Games | Xalapa, Mexico | 2nd | 4×100 m relay | 44.02 A |
| 2016 | Ibero-American Championships | Rio de Janeiro, Brazil | 4th | 4×100 m relay | 44.14 |
| 2017 | South American Championships | Asunción, Paraguay | 7th | 100 m | 11.54 (w) |
| 2017 | South American Championships | Asunción, Paraguay | 9th (h) | 200 m | 23.76 (w) |
| 2017 | South American Championships | Asunción, Paraguay | 2nd | 4×100 m relay | 44.50 |
| 2017 | Bolivarian Games | Santa Marta, Colombia | 6th | 100 m | 11.84 |
| 2017 | Bolivarian Games | Santa Marta, Colombia | 6th | 200 m | 47.79 |
| 2017 | Bolivarian Games | Santa Marta, Colombia | 3rd | 4 × 100 m relay | 45.96 |
| 2018 | Central American and Caribbean Games | Barranquilla, Colombia | 4th | 4×100 m relay | 44.19 |

^{1}: Did not finish in the final.
