= Alberth Bravo =

Venezuelan sprinter (born 1987)

Personal information
- Full name: Alberth Idel Bravo Morales
- Born: 29 August 1987 (age 38) Cabimas, Zulia, Venezuela
- Height: 1.98 m (6 ft 6 in)
- Weight: 92 kg (203 lb)

Sport
- Country: Venezuela
- Sport: Athletics
- Events: 4 × 400m Relay; 400m
- Updated on 15 December 2014

Alberth Idel Bravo Morales (born 29 August 1987) is a Venezuelan sprinter. He also competed successfully in hurdling and high jump.

== Career ==
At the 2012 and 2016 Summer Olympics, he competed in the Men's 400 metres, and Men's 4 × 400 metres relay.

== Personal bests ==
- 200 m: 20.96 s (wind: +1.8 m/s) – Cartagena, Colombia, 6 July 2013
- 400 m: 45.21 s A – Xalapa, Mexico, 25 November 2014
- 110 m hurdles: 13.89 s A (wind: 0.9 m/s) – Sucre, Bolivia, 23 November 2009
- High jump: 2.22 m – San Felipe, Venezuela, 29 September 2006
- Long jump: 7.17 m – Valencia, Venezuela, 15 July 2006
- 400 m hurdles: 50.36 – Luque, Paraguay. 24 June 2017

== International competitions ==
| Year | Competition | Venue | Position | Event | Notes |
Representing Venezuela
| 2004 | South American Youth Championships | Guayaquil, Ecuador | 1st | High jump | 2.01m |
| 2006 | Ibero-American Championships | Ponce, Puerto Rico | 7th | High jump | 2.08 m |
| 2006 | South American Under-23 Championships / South American Games | Buenos Aires, Argentina | 5th | 110 m hurdles | 14.59 s w (wind: +2.6 m/s) |
| 2006 | South American Under-23 Championships / South American Games | Buenos Aires, Argentina | 3rd | High jump | 2.11 m |
| 2007 | ALBA Games | Caracas, Venezuela | 3rd | High jump | 2.10 m |
| 2009 | ALBA Games | Havana, Cuba | 3rd (h) | 110 m hurdles | 14.19 s (wind: -2.0 m/s) |
| 2009 | ALBA Games | Havana, Cuba | 1st | High jump | 2.15 m |
| 2009 | World Military Track and Field Championships | Sofia, Bulgaria | 7th | 400 m | 48.28 s |
| 2009 | World Military Track and Field Championships | Sofia, Bulgaria | 4th (h) | 110 m hurdles | 14.72 s (wind: +1.0 m/s) |
| 2009 | World Military Track and Field Championships | Sofia, Bulgaria | 4th | 4 × 400 m relay | 3:13.25 min |
| 2009 | South American Championships | Lima, Peru | 2nd | High jump | 2.13 m A |
| 2009 | Central American and Caribbean Championships | Havana, Cuba | 5th (h) | 400 m | 48.00 s |
| 2009 | Central American and Caribbean Championships | Havana, Cuba | 9th | High jump | 2.05 m |
| 2009 | Central American and Caribbean Championships | Havana, Cuba | 8th | 4 × 400 m relay | 3:09.61 min |
| 2009 | Bolivarian Games | Sucre, Bolivia | 2nd | 110 m hurdles | 13.89 s A (wind: +0.9 m/s) |
| 2009 | Bolivarian Games | Sucre, Bolivia | 1st | High jump | 2.22 m A |
| 2009 | Bolivarian Games | Sucre, Bolivia | 1st | 4 × 400 m relay | 3:06.91 min A |
| 2010 | Ibero-American Championships | San Fernando, Spain | 3rd | 4 × 400 m relay | 3:05.53 min |
| 2010 | Central American and Caribbean Games | Mayagüez, Puerto Rico | 6th | 4 × 400 m relay | 3:07.98 min |
| 2012 | Ibero-American Championships | Barquisimeto, Venezuela | 4th | 400m | 45.99 s |
| 2012 | Ibero-American Championships | Barquisimeto, Venezuela | 2nd | 4 × 400 m relay | 3:01.70 min |
| 2012 | Olympic Games | London, United Kingdom | 7th (sf) | 400 m | 46.22 s |
| 2012 | Olympic Games | London, United Kingdom | 7th | 4 × 400 m relay | 3:02.18 min |
| 2013 | South American Championships | Cartagena, Colombia | 5th | 200 m | 20.96 (wind: +1.8 m/s) |
| 2013 | South American Championships | Cartagena, Colombia | 3rd | 4 × 100 m relay | 39.76 |
| 2013 | South American Championships | Cartagena, Colombia | 1st | 4 × 400 m relay | 3:03.64 |
| 2013 | World Championships | Moscow, Russia | 21st (h) | 4 × 100 m relay | 39.14 |
| 2013 | Bolivarian Games | Trujillo, Peru | 2nd | 400 m | 46.24 |
| 2013 | Bolivarian Games | Trujillo, Peru | 2nd | 4 × 400 m relay | 3:07.19 |
| 2014 | World Relays | Nassau, Bahamas | 6th | 4 × 400 m relay | 3:01.44 |
| 2014 | Central American and Caribbean Games | Xalapa, Mexico | 3rd | 400m | 45.82 A |
| 2014 | Central American and Caribbean Games | Xalapa, Mexico | 2nd | 4 × 400 m relay | 3:01.80 A |
| 2015 | IAAF World Relays | Nassau, Bahamas | 13th (h) | 4 × 400 m relay | 3:06.15 |
| 2015 | South American Championships | Lima, Peru | 1st | 400 m | 45.26 |
| 2015 | South American Championships | Lima, Peru | 1st | 4 × 400 m | 3:04.96 |
| 2015 | Pan American Games | Toronto, Canada | 5th (sf) | 400 m | 46.09 |
| 2015 | Pan American Games | Toronto, Canada | 7th | 4 × 400 m relay | 3:03.47 |
| 2015 | World Championships | Beijing, China | 28th (h) | 400 m | 45.28 |
| 2015 | World Championships | Beijing, China | 14th (h) | 4 × 400 m relay | 3:02.96 |
| 2016 | World Indoor Championships | Portland, United States | 21st (h) | 400 m | 47.63 |
| 2016 | Ibero-American Championships | Rio de Janeiro, Brazil | 3rd | 4 × 400 m relay | 3:03.61 |
| 2016 | Olympic Games | Rio de Janeiro, Brazil | 35th (h) | 400 m | 46.15 |
| 2016 | Olympic Games | Rio de Janeiro, Brazil | 12th (h) | 4 × 400 m relay | 3:02.69 |
| 2017 | South American Championships | Asunción, Paraguay | 6th | 400 m | 47.62 |
| 2017 | South American Championships | Asunción, Paraguay | 2nd | 400 m hurdles | 50.36 |
| 2017 | South American Championships | Asunción, Paraguay | 3rd | 4 × 400 m | 3:07.74 |
