= Daniel Grueso =

Colombian sprinter (born 1985)

Personal information
- Full name: Daniel Alfonso Grueso Barco
- Born: July 30, 1985 (age 40) Tuluá, Valle del Cauca, Colombia
- Height: 1.83 m (6 ft 0 in)
- Weight: 73 kg (161 lb)

Sport
- Country: Colombia
- Sport: Athletics
Medal record
Men's athletics
Representing Colombia
Bolivarian Games
Gold medal – first place	2005 Armenia-Pereira	100 m
Gold medal – first place	2005 Armenia-Pereira	200 m
Gold medal – first place	2005 Armenia-Pereira	4×100 m relay
Gold medal – first place	2009 Sucre	100 m
Gold medal – first place	2009 Sucre	4×100 m relay
Silver medal – second place	2009 Sucre	200 m
Bronze medal – third place	2013 Trujillo	4×100 m relay
- Updated on 28 December 2024

Daniel Alfonso Grueso Barco (born 30 July 1985 in Tuluá) is a Colombian sprinter who specializes in the 100 and 200 metres. His personal best time is 10.17 seconds in the 100 metres, achieved in November 2008 in Cali, and 20.49 seconds in the 200 metres, achieved in April 2010 in Mayagüez.

He finished eighth in 200 m at the 2004 World Junior Championships. He also competed at the 2007 World Championships and the 2008 Olympic Games without reaching the final. However, in Beijing he qualified for the second round after finishing fourth in his heat behind Asafa Powell, Kim Collins and Craig Pickering. His time of 10.35 was the fifth fastest losing time after the 10.25 of Nobuharu Asahara, advancing him to the second round. In that second round he finished in a time of 10.37 seconds, which was the eighth and last time of the heat, causing elimination. He also took part in the 200 metres individual, where he was eliminated after the first round as he placed seventh in his heat in a time of 21.15 seconds.

== Personal bests ==
- 100 m: 10.17 (wind: +1.8 m/s) – (Colombia) Cali, 25 November 2008
- 200 m: 20.49 (wind: -0.1 m/s) – (Puerto Rico) Mayagüez, 17 April 2010
- 400 m: 46.09 – (Puerto Rico) Ponce, 29 March 2008

== Competition record ==
Year	Competition	Venue	Position	Event	Notes
Representing Colombia
2004	South American U23 Championships	Barquisimeto, Venezuela	3rd	100m	10.52 (wind: +0.0 m/s)
2004	South American U23 Championships	Barquisimeto, Venezuela	2nd	4 × 100 m relay	40.24
2004	World Junior Championships	Grosseto, Italy	20th (sf)	100 m	10.73 (wind: +0.3 m/s)
2004	World Junior Championships	Grosseto, Italy	8th	200 m	21.45 (wind: +0.1 m/s)
2005	South American Championships	Cali, Colombia	4th	100 m	10.56
2005	South American Championships	Cali, Colombia	4th	200 m	20.83
2005	South American Championships	Cali, Colombia	2nd	4 × 100 m relay	39.85
2005	Bolivarian Games	Armenia, Colombia	1st	100 m	10.44 (wind: -0.4 m/s) A
2005	Bolivarian Games	Armenia, Colombia	1st	200 m	20.75 (wind: +0.4 m/s) GR A
2005	Bolivarian Games	Armenia, Colombia	1st	4 × 100 m relay	39.80 A
2006	Ibero-American Championships	Ponce, Puerto Rico	7th	100 m	10.61
2006	Central American and Caribbean Games	Cartagena, Colombia	13th (sf)	100 m	10.46
2006	Central American and Caribbean Games	Cartagena, Colombia	7th	4 × 100 m relay	40.30
2006	South American Championships	Tunja, Colombia	1st	100 m	10.50
2006	South American Championships	Tunja, Colombia	2nd	200 m	20.99
2006	South American U23 Championships / South American Games	Buenos Aires, Argentina	3rd	100m	10.47 (wind: +0.9 m/s)
2006	South American U23 Championships / South American Games	Buenos Aires, Argentina	3rd	200m	20.92 (wind: +2.3 m/s) w
2006	South American U23 Championships / South American Games	Buenos Aires, Argentina	3rd	4 × 100 m relay	40.20
2006	South American U23 Championships / South American Games	Buenos Aires, Argentina	3rd	4 × 400 m relay	3:11.28
2007	South American Championships	São Paulo, Brazil	3rd	200 m	20.66 (=NR)
2007	South American Championships	São Paulo, Brazil	2nd	4 × 100 m relay	39.80
2007	Pan American Games	Rio de Janeiro, Brazil	11th (sf)	200 m	20.96
2007	World Championships	Osaka, Japan	36th (h)	200 m	21.11
2008	Central American and Caribbean Championships	Cali, Colombia	6th	100 m	10.41
2008	Central American and Caribbean Championships	Cali, Colombia	5th	4 × 400 m relay	3:06.23
2008	Olympic Games	Beijing, China	36th (qf)	100 m	10.37
2008	Olympic Games	Beijing, China	45th (h)	200 m	21.15
2009	South American Championships	Lima, Peru	2nd	100 m	10.39
2009	South American Championships	Lima, Peru	1st	4 × 100 m relay	39.41
2009	World Championships	Berlin, Germany	11th (h)	100 m	10.27
2009	Bolivarian Games	Sucre, Bolivia	1st	100 m	10.27 GR A
2009	Bolivarian Games	Sucre, Bolivia	2nd	200 m	20.79 A
2009	Bolivarian Games	Sucre, Bolivia	1st	4 × 100 m relay	39.25 GR A
2010	Ibero-American Championships	San Fernando, Spain	3rd	100 m	10.39
2010	Ibero-American Championships	San Fernando, Spain	3rd	4 × 100 m relay	39.76
2010	Central American and Caribbean Games	Mayagüez, Puerto Rico	9th (h)	100 m	10.28
2010	Central American and Caribbean Games	Mayagüez, Puerto Rico	7th	200 m	20.94
2010	Central American and Caribbean Games	Mayagüez, Puerto Rico	5th	4 × 100 m relay	39.20 (NR)
2011	South American Championships	Buenos Aires, Argentina	1st	200 m	20.90
2011	South American Championships	Buenos Aires, Argentina	2nd	4 × 100 m relay	39.88
2011	Central American and Caribbean Championships	Mayagüez, Puerto Rico	7th (h)	4 × 100 m relay	40.22
2011	World Championships	Daegu, South Korea	26th (h)	200 m	20.87
2011	Pan American Games	Guadalajara, Mexico	15th (sf)	200 m	20.83
2012	Ibero-American Championships	Barquisimeto, Venezuela	5th	100 m	10.63
2012	Ibero-American Championships	Barquisimeto, Venezuela	8th (h)	200 m	21.16
2013	South American Championships	Cartagena, Colombia	6th	200 m	21.19
2013	South American Championships	Cartagena, Colombia	2nd	4 × 100 m relay	39.76
2013	Bolivarian Games	Trujillo, Peru	4th	100 m	10.70 (wind: -0.3 m/s)
2013	Bolivarian Games	Trujillo, Peru	4th	200 m	21.40 (wind: +0.0 m/s)
2013	Bolivarian Games	Trujillo, Peru	3rd	4 × 100 m relay	39.86
2014	South American Games	Santiago, Chile	8th (h)	200 m	21.55
2014	South American Games	Santiago, Chile	3rd	4 × 100 m relay	40.26
