= José Peña (steeplechaser) =

Venezuelan track and field athlete (born 1987)

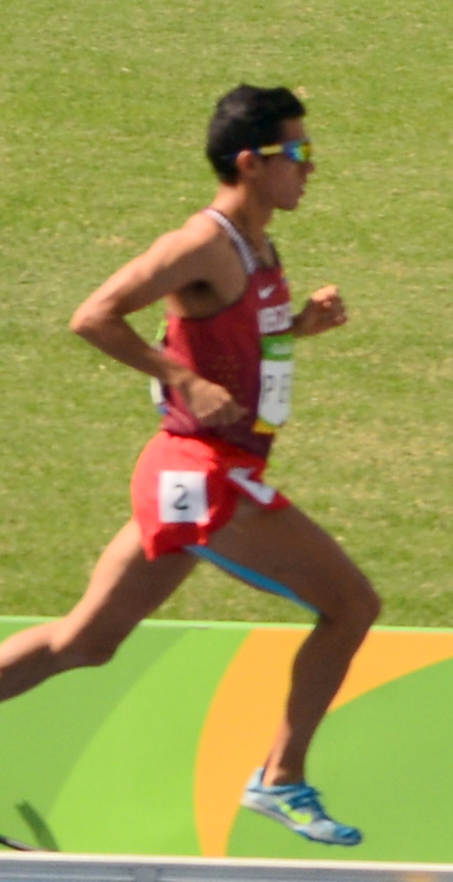
- Peña at the 2016 Olympics

Personal information
- Full name: José Gregorio Peña Trejo
- Born: 12 January 1987 (age 39) San Cristóbal, Táchira, Venezuela
- Height: 1.60 m (5 ft 3 in)
- Weight: 52 kg (115 lb)

Sport
- Country: Venezuela
- Sport: Athletics
Medal record
Men's athletics
Representing Venezuela
Pan American Games
Gold medal – first place	2011 Guadalajara	3000 m st.
Bolivarian Games
Bronze medal – third place	2009 Sucre	3000 m steeplechase
South American Championships
Gold medal – first place	2013 Cartagena	3000 m st.
Silver medal – second place	2009 Lima	3000 m st.
Bronze medal – third place	2007 São Paulo	3000 m st.
CAC Championships
Silver medal – second place	2009 Havana	3000 m st.
South American Youth Championships
Gold medal – first place	2004 Guayaquil	2000 m steeplechase
- Updated on 21 December 2014

José Gregorio Peña Trejo (born 12 January 1987) is a Venezuelan track and field athlete who specialises in the 3000 metres steeplechase. His personal best for the event is 8:20.87 minutes

== Biography ==
Born in San Cristóbal, Táchira, he first established himself on the continental youth scene. His first international outing came at the 2002 South American Youth Championships in Athletics, where he came fourth in the boy's 2000 metres steeplechase race. At the 2004 edition of the competition, he won the steeplechase gold medal and also came fourth in the 1500 metres and fifth in the 3000 metres flat events. Moving up to the junior under-20 ranks, he ran at the 2005 South American Junior Championships in Athletics. There he won the 3000 m steeplechase silver medal behind Peru's Mario Bazán and he also placed eighth in the 1500 m final. He represented Venezuelan on the global stage at the 2006 World Junior Championships in Athletics, but did not progress beyond the steeplechase heats. In November 2006, he was the runner-up at the 2006 South American Games (again to Bazán) and ran a national junior record time of 8:50.88 minutes.

In Peña's first season as a senior athlete, he won the bronze medal in the steeplechase at the 2007 South American Championships in Athletics. He was also the runner-up at the 2007 ALBA Games event. He focused on longer distances in 2008, coming seventh in the South American Cross Country Championships and winning the national title over 5000 metres. At the 2008 Ibero-American Championships in Athletics he came fifth in his specialist steeplechase event.

His focus returned to steeplechasing in the 2009 season. He came second at the 2009 ALBA Games, fifth at the World Military Track and Field Championships, then ran a personal best of 8:36.17 minutes at the 2009 South American Championships in Athletics in Lima – finishing just one second behind the host nation's Mario Bazán who broke the championship record. Two weeks later, he competed at the 2009 Central American and Caribbean Championships in Athletics and won the silver medal. He won the 2010 Venezuelan steeplechase title, but missed the rest of the track season that year.

At the 2011 South American Championships in Athletics, Peña missed out on a steeplechase medal for the first time, coming in fifth place. A month later, he ran a personal best of 8:34.90 minutes at the 2011 Military World Games and was eighth in the event final. At the end of July he won the title at the 2011 ALBA Games. The 2011 Pan American Games in Guadalajara saw him achieve his best finish to date, taking the Pan American gold medal ahead of Brazil's Hudson de Souza with a tactical sprint finish. This achievement followed in the footsteps of his compatriot Néstor Nieves, who won the same event in 2003.

Peña served as the flag bearer for Venezuela at the opening ceremony of the 2014 South American Games.

== Personal bests ==
- 1500 m: 3:44.06 min – Eagle Rock, United States, 4 May 2013
- 3000 m: 7:54.42 min – Linz, Austria, 26 August 2013
- 5000 m: 13:47.25 min – Stanford, United States, 29 March 2013
- 3000 m steeplechase: 8:20.87 min NR – Berlin, Germany, 1 September 2013

== International competitions ==
Year	Competition	Venue	Position	Event	Notes
Representing Venezuela
2002	South American Youth Championships	Asunción, Paraguay	4th	2000 m s'chase	6:27.07
2004	South American Youth Championships	Guayaquil, Ecuador	4th	1500 m	3:59.8
2004	South American Youth Championships	Guayaquil, Ecuador	5th	3000 m	8:45.8
2004	South American Youth Championships	Guayaquil, Ecuador	1st	2000 m s'chase	5:52.2
2005	South American Junior Championships	Rosario, Argentina	2nd	3000 m s'chase	9:13.74
2006	World Junior Championships	Beijing, China	13th (h)	3000 m s'chase	8:52.36
2006	South American Under-23 Championships / South American Games	Buenos Aires, Argentina	8th	5000m	14:34.13
2006	South American Under-23 Championships / South American Games	Buenos Aires, Argentina	2nd	3000 m s'chase	8:50.88 NJR
2007	ALBA Games	Caracas, Venezuela	2nd	3000 m s'chase	8:51.42
2007	South American Championships	São Paulo, Brazil	3rd	3000 m s'chase	8:54.43
2008	South American Cross Country Championships	Asunción, Paraguay	7th	Long course (12 km)	38:47
2008	Ibero-American Championships	Iquique, Chile	5th	3000 m s'chase	8:54.80
2009	ALBA Games	Havana, Cuba	2nd	3000 m s'chase	8:44.47
2009	World Military Track & Field Championships	Sofia, Bulgaria	5th	3000 m s'chase	8:48.00
2009	South American Championships	Lima, Peru	2nd	3000 m s'chase	8:36.17 PB A
2009	Central American and Caribbean Championships	Havana, Cuba	2nd	3000 m s'chase	8:51.03
2009	Bolivarian Games	Sucre, Bolivia	3rd	3000 m s'chase	10.04.90 A
2011	South American Championships	Buenos Aires, Argentina	5th	3000 m s'chase	8:44.18
2011	Military World Games	Rio de Janeiro, Brazil	8th	3000 m s'chase	8:47.18
2011	ALBA Games	Barquisimeto, Venezuela	1st	3000 m s'chase	8:45.25
2011	South American Road Mile Championships	Belém, Brazil	6th	One mile	4:14
2011	Pan American Games	Guadalajara, Mexico	1st	3000 m s'chase	8:48.19 A
2012	Ibero-American Championships	Barquisimeto, Venezuela	1st	3000 m s'chase	8:37.67
2012	Olympic Games	London, United Kingdom	16th (h)	3000 m s'chase	8:24.06 NR
2013	South American Championships	Cartagena, Colombia	7th	1500 m	3:47.63
2013	South American Championships	Cartagena, Colombia	1st	3000 m s'chase	8:32.01
2013	World Championships	Moscow, Russia	16th (h)	3000 m s'chase	8:24.88
2013	Bolivarian Games	Trujillo, Peru	1st	3000 m s'chase	8:26.6 (ht)
2014	South American Games	Santiago, Chile	–	5000 m	DNF
2014	South American Games	Santiago, Chile	1st	3000 m s'chase	8:36.81
2014	Central American and Caribbean Games	Xalapa, Mexico	2nd	3000m s'chase	8:45.04 A
2015	Pan American Games	Toronto, Canada	7th	3000 m s'chase	8:59.40
2016	Ibero-American Championships	Rio de Janeiro, Brazil	5th	3000 m s'chase	8:43.90
2016	Olympic Games	Rio de Janeiro, Brazil	22nd (h)	3000 m s'chase	8:32.38
2017	South American Championships	Asunción, Paraguay	1st	3000 m s'chase	8:45.93
2017	World Championships	London, United Kingdom	31st (h)	3000 m s'chase	8:37.15
2017	Bolivarian Games	Santa Marta, Colombia	1st	3000 m s'chase	8:39.99
2018	South American Games	Cochabamba, Bolivia	4th	3000 m s'chase	9:30.00
2018	Central American and Caribbean Games	Barranquilla, Colombia	–	3000 m s'chase	DNF
2019	South American Championships	Lima, Peru	6th	3000 m s'chase	8:57.95
2019	Pan American Games	Lima, Peru	9th	3000 m s'chase	9:02.04
2022	Ibero-American Championships	La Nucía, Spain	6th	3000 m s'chase	8:46.81
2023	ALBA Games	Caracas, Venezuela	1st	3000 m s'chase	9:09.15
2023	Central American and Caribbean Games	San Salvador, El Salvador	–	3000 m s'chase	DNF
2023	Pan American Games	Santiago, Chile	12th	3000 m s'chase	9:17.90
