= Athletics at the 2006 South American Games – Results =

These are the full results of the athletics competition at the 2006 South American Games also serving as the 2006 South American Under-23 Championships in Athletics. The event took place between November 10 and November 12, 2006 at Centro Nacional de Alto Rendimiento Deportivo (CeNARD) in Buenos Aires, Argentina.

== Men's results ==
=== 100 meters ===
Heat 1 – 10 November 17:10h - Wind: +0.9 m/s

Rank	Name	Nationality	Time	Notes
1	Kael Becerra	Chile	10.46	Q
2	Franklin Nazareno	Ecuador	10.48	Q
3	Harlin Echavarría	Colombia	10.64	Q
4	Ronald Amaya	Venezuela	10.67	q
5	Mariano Fabián Jiménez	Argentina	10.68	q
6	Nilson de Oliveira André	Brazil	10.77	

Heat 2 – 10 November 17:10h - Wind: +1.0 m/s

Rank	Name	Nationality	Time	Notes
1	Daniel Grueso	Colombia	10.39	Q
2	Mauro da Silva	Brazil	10.58	Q
3	Miguel Wilken	Argentina	10.68	Q
4	Ignácio Rojas	Chile	10.71	
5	César Marchán	Venezuela	10.80	
6	Nicolás López	Paraguay	24.46	

Final – 10 November 19:10h - Wind: +0.9 m/s

Rank	Name	Nationality	Time	Notes
1st place, gold medalist(s)	Kael Becerra	Chile	10.33	
2nd place, silver medalist(s)	Franklin Nazareno	Ecuador	10.45	
3rd place, bronze medalist(s)	Daniel Grueso	Colombia	10.47	
4	Harlin Echavarría	Colombia	10.58	
5	Mauro da Silva	Brazil	10.63	
6	Mariano Fabián Jiménez	Argentina	10.74	
6	Miguel Wilken	Argentina	10.74	
8	Ronald Amaya	Venezuela	10.79	

=== 200 meters ===
Heat 1 – 12 November 10:35h - Wind: +2.5 m/s

Rank	Name	Nationality	Time	Notes
1	Cristián Reyes	Chile	21.08 w	Q
2	Mariano Fabián Jiménez	Argentina	21.11 w	Q
3	Daniel Grueso	Colombia	21.20 w	Q
4	Bruno de Barros	Brazil	21.28 w	q
5	Ronald Amaya	Venezuela	21.40 w	q
6	Edgar Galeano	Paraguay	22.47 w	
7	Marco Rivadeneira	Ecuador	22.68 w	

Heat 2 – 12 November 10:35h - Wind: +2.0 m/s

Rank	Name	Nationality	Time	Notes
1	Franklin Nazareno	Ecuador	21.27	Q
2	Jorge Célio Sena	Brazil	21.43	Q
3	Kael Becerra	Chile	21.46	Q
4	Hawer Murillo	Colombia	21.52	
5	Miguel Wilken	Argentina	22.13	
6	Wilmer Rivas	Venezuela	27.14	

Final – 12 November 17:55h - Wind: +2.3 m/s

Rank	Name	Nationality	Time	Notes
1st place, gold medalist(s)	Franklin Nazareno	Ecuador	20.76 w	
2nd place, silver medalist(s)	Cristián Reyes	Chile	20.88 w	
3rd place, bronze medalist(s)	Daniel Grueso	Colombia	20.92 w	
4	Kael Becerra	Chile	20.93 w	
5	Mariano Fabián Jiménez	Argentina	21.05 w	
6	Bruno de Barros	Brazil	21.20 w	
7	Jorge Célio Sena	Brazil	21.25 w	
8	Ronald Amaya	Venezuela	21.35 w	

=== 400 meters ===
Heat 1 – 10 November 10:30h

Rank	Name	Nationality	Time	Notes
1	Geiner Mosquera	Colombia	48.04	Q
2	Andrés Silva	Uruguay	48.26	Q
3	Roberto Linares	Venezuela	48.50	Q
4	Rodrigo Bargas	Brazil	48.84	q
5	Christian Deymonnaz	Argentina	48.92	q
6	Luis Garate	Ecuador	50.91	

Heat 2 – 10 November 10:30h

Rank	Name	Nationality	Time	Notes
1	Fernando de Almeida	Brazil	48.19	Q
2	Josner Rodríguez	Venezuela	48.56	Q
3	Juan Eduardo López	Chile	48.92	Q
4	Ariel Picchi	Argentina	49.08	
5	Marco Rivadeneira	Ecuador	50.60	

Final – 10 November 18:40h

Rank	Name	Nationality	Time	Notes
1st place, gold medalist(s)	Andrés Silva	Uruguay	46.69	
2nd place, silver medalist(s)	Geiner Mosquera	Colombia	46.70	
3rd place, bronze medalist(s)	Josner Rodríguez	Venezuela	46.94	
4	Fernando de Almeida	Brazil	47.24	
5	Roberto Linares	Venezuela	48.19	
6	Christian Deymonnaz	Argentina	48.37	
7	Rodrigo Bargas	Brazil	48.87	
8	Juan Eduardo López	Chile	49.04	

=== 800 meters ===
Final – 10 November 18:20h

Rank	Name	Nationality	Time	Notes
1st place, gold medalist(s)	Kleberson Davide	Brazil	1:51.20	
2nd place, silver medalist(s)	Eduar Villanueva	Venezuela	1:51.24	
3rd place, bronze medalist(s)	Freddy Espinoza	Colombia	1:51.31	
4	Daniel Palma	Chile	1:51.64	
5	Gilder Michael Barboza	Venezuela	1:52.00	
6	César Barquero	Peru	1:52.24	
7	Pablo Navarrete	Chile	1:52.85	
8	Hugo Nazareno Aguilar	Argentina	1:54.12	
9	Luis Matías Chaparro	Argentina	1:54.49	
10	Israel Delgado	Peru	1:54.64	
11	Rodrigo Trinidad	Paraguay	1:56.67	
	Diego Chargal Gomes	Brazil	DNF	

=== 1500 meters ===
Final – 11 November 18:10h

Rank	Name	Nationality	Time	Notes
1st place, gold medalist(s)	Eduar Villanueva	Venezuela	3:51.54	
2nd place, silver medalist(s)	Cleveland Forde	Guyana	3:52.46	
3rd place, bronze medalist(s)	Eder Oliveira da Silva	Brazil	3:52.63	
4	Mario Bazán	Peru	3:52.69	
5	Enzo Yáñez	Chile	3:53.75	
6	Freddy Espinoza	Colombia	3:54.42	
7	Eduardo Gregorio	Uruguay	3:54.75	
8	Cristián Crobat	Argentina	3:54.90	
9	Gilder Michael Barboza	Venezuela	3:59.24	
10	Robson de Lima	Brazil	4:00.19	
11	Hugo Nazareno Aguilar	Argentina	4:00.93	
12	William Castillo	Ecuador	4:06.48	
13	Richard Mamani	Bolivia	4:09.76	

=== 5000 meters ===
Final – 10 November 19:30h

Rank	Name	Nationality	Time	Notes
1st place, gold medalist(s)	Cleveland Forde	Guyana	14:07.08	
2nd place, silver medalist(s)	Joílson da Silva	Brazil	14:09.46	
3rd place, bronze medalist(s)	Sérgio Celestino da Silva	Brazil	14:09.95	
4	Óscar Robayo	Colombia	14:16.16	
5	Jason Gutiérrez	Colombia	14:18.31	
6	Santiago Nicolás Figueroa	Argentina	14:21.10	
7	Alexander de los Santos	Uruguay	14:24.06	
8	José Gregorio Peña	Venezuela	14:34.13	
9	Alberto Brigido Olivera	Argentina	14:42.11	
10	William Castillo	Ecuador	14:43.36	
11	Richard Mamani	Bolivia	14:55.87	
12	Paulo Buenaño	Ecuador	15:00.76	
13	José Luis Pérez	Uruguay	15:13.50	
14	Enzo Yáñez	Chile	15:16.30	
15	Delis Ayala	Paraguay	15:17.61	
16	Juan Daniel Quispe	Bolivia	15:32.69	
17	Gustavo López	Paraguay	15:40.68	

=== 10,000 meters ===
Final – 12 November 18:50h

Rank	Name	Nationality	Time	Notes
1st place, gold medalist(s)	Sérgio Celestino da Silva	Brazil	29:52.06	
2nd place, silver medalist(s)	Jason Gutiérrez	Colombia	30:17.19	
3rd place, bronze medalist(s)	Alexander de los Santos	Uruguay	30:28.93	
4	Paulo Buenaño	Ecuador	31:10.30	
5	Juan Daniel Quispe	Bolivia	31:54.34	
6	Martín Esteban Ñancucheo	Argentina	32:10.13	
7	William Castillo	Ecuador	33:01.69	
8	Juan Benítez	Argentina	33:10.60	
	Reginaldo de Oliveira Campos Junior	Brazil	DNF	
	Óscar Robayo	Colombia	DNF	

=== 3000 meters steeplechase ===
Final – 12 November 17:10h

Rank	Name	Nationality	Time	Notes
1st place, gold medalist(s)	Mario Bazán	Peru	8:49.67	
2nd place, silver medalist(s)	José Gregorio Peña	Venezuela	8:50.88	
3rd place, bronze medalist(s)	Santiago Nicolás Figueroa	Argentina	8:54.50	
4	Alberto Brigido Olivera	Argentina	9:12.53	
5	Ruguevam Vieira da Silva	Brazil	9:17.76	
6	Gustavo López	Paraguay	9:32.46	
7	David Veizaga	Bolivia	9:46.28	
8	Delis Ayala	Paraguay	10:04.10	

=== 110 meters hurdles ===
Final – 10 November 16:35h - Wind: +2.6 m/s

Rank	Name	Nationality	Time	Notes
1st place, gold medalist(s)	Rodrigo da Silva Pereira	Brazil	13.81 w	
2nd place, silver medalist(s)	Eder Antonio Souza	Brazil	13.82 w	
3rd place, bronze medalist(s)	Jorge McFarlane	Peru	14.43 w	
4	Federico Ruíz	Argentina	14.48 w	
5	Alberth Bravo	Venezuela	14.59 w	
6	Mariano Benjamin Romero	Argentina	15.00 w	

=== 400 meters hurdles ===
Heat 1 – 11 November 10:20h

Rank	Name	Nationality	Time	Notes
1	Raphael Fernandes	Brazil	51.74	Q
2	Ingo Stotz	Chile	52.24	Q
3	Sebastián Lasquera	Argentina	52.26	Q
4	José Manuel Céspedes	Venezuela	52.38	q
5	Amílcar Torres	Colombia	54.07	

Heat 2 – 11 November 10:20h

Rank	Name	Nationality	Time	Notes
1	Andrés Silva	Uruguay	52.21	Q
2	Víctor Solarte	Venezuela	52.71	Q
3	Juan Pablo Maturana	Colombia	53.15	Q
4	Christian Deymonnaz	Argentina	53.35	q
5	Jorge Alegria	Chile	53.51	

Final – 11 November 19:00h

Rank	Name	Nationality	Time	Notes
1st place, gold medalist(s)	Andrés Silva	Uruguay	50.46	
2nd place, silver medalist(s)	Raphael Fernandes	Brazil	50.55	
3rd place, bronze medalist(s)	Sebastián Lasquera	Argentina	51.60	
4	José Manuel Céspedes	Venezuela	51.70	
5	Juan Pablo Maturana	Colombia	52.40	
6	Christian Deymonnaz	Argentina	52.49	
7	Víctor Solarte	Venezuela	52.80	
8	Ingo Stotz	Chile	53.17	

=== High jump ===
Final – 11 November 16:10h

Rank	Name	Nationality	Attempts								Result	Notes
Rank	Name	Nationality	1.90	1.95	2.00	2.05	2.08	2.11	2.14	2.18	Result	Notes
1st place, gold medalist(s)	Fábio Baptista	Brazil	-	-	o	o	o	o	o	xxx	2.14	
2nd place, silver medalist(s)	Wagner Miller	Colombia	-	-	o	o	o	o	xxx		2.11	
3rd place, bronze medalist(s)	Alberth Bravo	Venezuela	-	-	-	o	o	o	xxx		2.11	
4	Pablo Sánchez	Venezuela	-	-	o	o	o	o	xxx		2.11	
5	Guilherme Henrique Cobbo	Brazil	-	-	o	o	o	xxx			2.08	
6	Cristóbal Gómez	Chile	o	o	o	xxx					2.00	
7	Cristián Calle	Ecuador	o	o	o	xxx					2.00	
8	Marcelo Andrés Thorne	Argentina	o	o	o	xxx					2.00	

Note: The number of missed jumps at intermediate heights appears to be incomplete.

=== Pole vault ===
Final – 12 November 16:40h

Rank	Name	Nationality	Attempts													Result	Notes
Rank	Name	Nationality	4.45	4.60	4.70	4.80	4.90	5.00	5.10	5.20	5.25	5.35	5.50	5.65	5.81	Result	Notes
1st place, gold medalist(s)	Germán Chiaraviglio	Argentina	-	-	-	-	-	-	-	xxo	-	o	o	o	xxx	5.65	
2nd place, silver medalist(s)	Guillermo Chiaraviglio Jr	Argentina	-	xo	o	-	o	o	xxo	xxo	xxx					5.20	
3rd place, bronze medalist(s)	João Gabriel Sousa	Brazil	-	-	-	o	x	o	xo	xxx						5.10	
4	Rodrigo Tenorio	Chile	xxo	o	xxx											4.60	
5	Derik Rolim Koubik	Brazil	o	xxx												4.45	

=== Long jump ===
Final – 10 November 17:35h

Rank	Name	Nationality	Attempts						Result	Notes
Rank	Name	Nationality	1	2	3	4	5	6	Result	Notes
1st place, gold medalist(s)	Thiago Jacinto Carahyba Dias	Brazil	7.56 w (+2.2)	7.50 w (+2.6)	7.42 (+1.5)	7.74 (+0.3)	3.59 w (+2.6)	7.59 (+1.8)	7.74 (+0.3 m/s)	
2nd place, silver medalist(s)	Louis Tristán	Peru	5.37 w (+2.6)	7.21 w (+2.2)	x	?	?	?	7.59 w (+2.7 m/s)	
3rd place, bronze medalist(s)	Hugo Chila	Ecuador	x	7.30 w (+2.4)	x	7.34 w (+2.2)	7.53 (+0.7)	x	7.53 (+0.7 m/s)	
4	Rogério da Silva Bispo	Brazil	7.50 (+0.3)	7.49 (0)	7.45 w (+2.1)	7.40 (+1.5)	5.74 (+0.7)	x	7.50 (+0.3 m/s)	
5	Jorge McFarlane	Peru	7.08 w (+6.9)	7.07 (+1.1)	7.03 (+1.8)	7.12 w (+3.7)	6.98 (+1.1)	7.18 (+1.4)	7.18 (+1.4 m/s)	
6	Dainnler Griego	Colombia	7.06 w (+4.5)	7.09 (+1.0)	5.87 w (+4.1)	6.97 (+0.8)	6.64 (+1.2)	6.74 w (+2.7)	7.09 (+1.0 m/s)	
7	Miguel Wilken	Argentina	6.39 (+1.7)	6.73 (+1.6)	x (+1.6)	7.05 (+1.4)	6.95 (+1.6)	6.73	7.05 w (+4.6 m/s)	
8	Francisco Pávez	Argentina	6.96 w (+2.6)	6.97 (+0.5)	6.89 w (+4.2)	6.99 w (+3.0)	5.62 (+1.4)	6.86 (+0.2)	6.99 w (+3.0 m/s)	
9	Daniel Pineda	Chile	5.80 w (+2.6)	x	-	-	-	-	5.80 w (+2.6 m/s)	

=== Triple jump ===
Final – 11 November 19:35h

Rank	Name	Nationality	Attempts						Result	Notes
Rank	Name	Nationality	1	2	3	4	5	6	Result	Notes
1st place, gold medalist(s)	Hugo Chila	Ecuador	15.68 (+1.3)	x (+1.1)	15.74 (+1.1)	15.73 (+1.6)	15.71 (+1.4)	16.12	16.12 (+1.4 m/s)	
2nd place, silver medalist(s)	Thiago Jacinto Carahyba Dias	Brazil	x	x	15.75 w (+4.0)	-	-	16.00 (+2.0)	16.00 (+2.0 m/s)	
3rd place, bronze medalist(s)	Jhon Murillo	Colombia	15.24 (+1.9)	15.48 (+1.7)	x	x	14.69 (+2.0)	15.23 w (+2.1)	15.48 (+1.7 m/s)	
4	Martín Osvaldo Falico	Argentina	14.71 (-0.2)	15.00 w (+2.2)	14.85 w (+2.5)	14.93 (+0.9)	14.75 (+0.5)	15.13 (+1.0)	15.13 (+1.0 m/s)	
5	Francisco Pávez	Argentina	14.08 (-0.2)	14.49 (0)	14.19 (+1.8)	14.18 (0)	14.12 (+1.0)	14.43 (+1.6)	14.49 (0 m/s)	

=== Shot put ===
Final – 10 November 16:15h

Rank	Name	Nationality	Attempts						Result	Notes
Rank	Name	Nationality	1	2	3	4	5	6	Result	Notes
1st place, gold medalist(s)	Germán Lauro	Argentina	19.22	19.33	19.78	x	x	19.29	19.78	NR
2nd place, silver medalist(s)	Carlos Jovanny García	Colombia	17.27	17.57	17.18	17.16	17.41	17.10	17.57	
3rd place, bronze medalist(s)	Gonzalo Riffo	Chile	16.47	16.79	16.48	17.02	16.97	x	17.02	
4	Gustavo Gomes de Mendonça	Brazil	15.79	15.99	16.72	15.94	x	x	16.72	
5	Raoni Marques de Morais	Brazil	15.02	15.43	15.96	15.89	15.84	x	15.96	
6	Aldo Gonzales	Bolivia	14.78	15.79	x	15.07	x	15.53	15.79	
7	Leandro Cheppi	Argentina	15.45	15.43	x	x	x	-	15.45	
8	Julio César Londoño	Colombia	x	14.83	14.83	14.28	13.78	14.62	14.83	
9	Maximiliano Alonso	Chile	14.22	14.14	14.83				14.83	

=== Discus throw ===
Final – 12 November 18:15h

Rank	Name	Nationality	Attempts						Result	Notes
Rank	Name	Nationality	1	2	3	4	5	6	Result	Notes
1st place, gold medalist(s)	Germán Lauro	Argentina	55.72	x	55.64	57.51	53.89	x	57.51	
2nd place, silver medalist(s)	Ronald Odair de Oliveira Julião	Brazil	53.06	x	54.45	55.13	54.54	54.77	55.13	
3rd place, bronze medalist(s)	Gustavo Gomes de Mendonça	Brazil	48.56	x	49.38	52.06	48.75	x	52.06	
4	Maximiliano Alonso	Chile	45.56	46.43	50.81	47.54	47.86	48.97	50.81	
5	Leandro Cheppi	Argentina	45.39	47.50	49.17	49.28	49.08	48.29	49.28	
6	Julio César Londoño	Colombia	x	45.35	x	48.31	46.82	44.52	48.31	
7	Jorge Donald Olmos	Bolivia	44.04	46.13	x	44.64	44.17	x	46.13	
8	Gonzalo Riffo	Chile	41.40	x	42.65	43.29	45.21	41.16	45.21	
9	Aldo Gonzales	Bolivia	41.50	x	x				41.50	

=== Hammer throw ===
Final – 10 November 15:00h

Rank	Name	Nationality	Attempts						Result	Notes
Rank	Name	Nationality	1	2	3	4	5	6	Result	Notes
1st place, gold medalist(s)	Diego Gallardo	Chile	59.81	63.95	x	x	61.76	x	63.95	
2nd place, silver medalist(s)	Douglas Wendell dos Santos	Brazil	x	60.38	x	x	x	55.21	60.38	
3rd place, bronze medalist(s)	Max Willian dos Santos	Brazil	59.77	60.03	59.99	60.02	56.28	x	60.03	
4	Jacobo de León	Colombia	x	x	52.38	57.05	57.85	56.21	57.85	
5	Gary Osorio	Peru	54.81	x	57.69	55.56	x	55.55	57.69	
6	Juan Manuel Charadia	Argentina	57.06	x	56.35	56.10	53.06	x	57.06	
7	Gabriel Vanni	Argentina	52.11	x	51.50	53.41	49.57	x	53.41	
8	Tomás Angosto	Chile	52.16	51.16	x	x	x	x	52.16	

=== Javelin throw ===
Final – 11 November 19:30h

Rank	Name	Nationality	Attempts						Result	Notes
Rank	Name	Nationality	1	2	3	4	5	6	Result	Notes
1st place, gold medalist(s)	Víctor Fatecha	Paraguay	75.45	73.24	x	-	-	-	75.45	
2nd place, silver medalist(s)	Júlio César Miranda de Oliveira	Brazil	68.36	67.68	x	65.71	66.75	72.10	72.10	
3rd place, bronze medalist(s)	Ignácio Guerra	Chile	68.27	65.45	70.10	66.70	66.49	70.03	70.10	
4	Orielson Cabrera	Colombia	61.84	65.26	63.06	61.39	62.23	63.51	65.26	
5	Jander Nunes	Brazil	65.14	64.11	x	x	x	63.04	65.14	
6	Alejandro Emilio Ionski	Argentina	59.40	64.13	61.28	55.79	56.77	56.91	64.13	
7	François Pouzet	Chile	61.45	61.41	57.27	61.85	60.60	61.39	61.85	
8	Xavier Mercado	Ecuador	x	54.52	54.91	x	56.45	x	56.45	
9	Milton Cian	Argentina	x	47.60	x				47.60	

=== Decathlon ===
Final – 11 November 20:20h

The highest mark recorded in each event is highlighted in yellow

Rank	Name	Nationality	100m	LJ	SP	HJ	400m	110m H	DT	PV	JT	1500m	Points	Notes
1st place, gold medalist(s)	Carlos Eduardo Bezerra Chinin	Brazil	11.11 (0); 836pts	7.47 (3.6); 927pts	12.42; 632pts	1.97; 776pts	49.56; 835pts	15.05 (3.1); 843pts	35.82; 580pts	3.50; 482pts	51.27; 607pts	4:31.47; 735pts	7253	
2nd place, silver medalist(s)	Luiz Alberto Cardoso de Araújo	Brazil	10.95 (0); 872pts	7.09 (2.9); 835pts	12.81; 656pts	1.82; 644pts	50.53; 790pts	14.68 (3.1); 889pts	37.92; 622pts	3.90; 590pts	51.03; 604pts	4:46.87; 638pts	7140	
3rd place, bronze medalist(s)	Gerardo Canale	Argentina	11.67 (0); 717pts	6.99 (0.3); 811pts	12.20; 619pts	2.03; 831pts	52.97; 683pts	15.42 (3.1); 799pts	34.72; 558pts	4.40; 731pts	51.85; 616pts	4:45.26; 648pts	7013	
4	Matías Sebastián López	Argentina	11.19 (0); 819pts	6.95 (6.0); 802pts	11.35; 567pts	1.97; 776pts	50.72; 782pts	15.52 (3.1); 788pts	33.42; 532pts	3.90; 590pts	46.32; 534pts	4:46.43; 640pts	6830	
5	Freddy Díaz	Venezuela	11.28 (0); 799pts	6.57 (5.5); 713pts	11.20; 558pts	1.79; 619pts	50.68; 784pts	15.10 (3.1); 837pts	33.90; 542pts	4.00; 617pts	42.91; 484pts	4:42.97; 662pts	6615	
	Gonzalo Barroilhet	Chile											DNF	

=== 20 kilometers walk ===
Final – 11 November 7:30h

Rank	Name	Nationality	Time	Notes
1st place, gold medalist(s)	James Rendón	Colombia	1:28:05.2	
2nd place, silver medalist(s)	Oswaldo Ortega	Ecuador	1:30:47.7	
3rd place, bronze medalist(s)	Yerko Araya	Chile	1:31:31.7	
	Pavel Chihuán	Peru	DQ	IAAF Rule 230
	Calisto José Sevegnani	Brazil	DQ	IAAF Rule 230
	Jonathan Riekmann	Brazil	DQ	IAAF Rule 230
	Juan Manuel Cano	Argentina	DQ	IAAF Rule 230

=== 4x100 meters relay ===
Final – 10 November 20:30h

Rank	Nation	Competitors	Time	Notes
1st place, gold medalist(s)	Venezuela	César Marchán; Jermaine Chirinos; Wilmer Rivas; Ronald Amaya	39.95	
2nd place, silver medalist(s)	Brazil	Nilson de Oliveira André; Jorge Célio Sena; Bruno de Barros; Mauro da Silva	40.15	
3rd place, bronze medalist(s)	Colombia	Harlin Echavarría; Álvaro Gómez; Hawer Murillo; Daniel Grueso	40.20	
4	Argentina	Federico Ruíz; Ariel Picchi; Miguel Wilken; Mariano Fabián Jiménez	40.68	
5	Ecuador	Luis Garate; Franklin Nazareno; Marco Rivadeneira; Hugo Chila	41.31	
6	Chile	Ingo Stotz; Cristián Reyes; Ignácio Rojas; Kael Becerra	41.87	

=== 4x400 meters relay ===
Final – 12 November 20:20h

Rank	Nation	Competitors	Time	Notes
1st place, gold medalist(s)	Brazil	Rodrigo Bargas; Kleberson Davide; Raphael Fernandes; Fernando de Almeida	3:08.38	
2nd place, silver medalist(s)	Chile	Kael Becerra; Ingo Stotz; Pablo Navarrete; Ignácio Rojas	3:10.08	
3rd place, bronze medalist(s)	Colombia	Daniel Grueso; Amílcar Torres; Juan Pablo Maturana; Geiner Mosquera	3:11.28	
4	Venezuela	Josner Rodríguez; Roberto Linares; Víctor Solarte; José Manuel Céspedes	3:11.41	
5	Argentina	Ariel Picchi; Sebastián Lasquera; Federico Ruíz; Christian Deymonnaz	3:13.14	
6	Ecuador	Hugo Chila; Franklin Nazareno; Luis Garate; Marco Rivadeneira	3:21.52	

== Women's results ==
=== 100 meters ===
Heat 1 – 10 November 16:50h - Wind: +3.0 m/s

Rank	Name	Nationality	Time	Notes
1	Yomara Hinestroza	Colombia	11.74 w	Q
2	María Carolina Díaz	Chile	11.89 w	Q
3	Liliana Tantucci	Argentina	11.94 w	Q
4	Tatiane de Paula Ferraz	Brazil	11.95 w	q
5	Jéssica Perea	Ecuador	12.24 w	q

Heat 2 – 10 November 16:50h - Wind: +3.3 m/s

Rank	Name	Nationality	Time	Notes
1	Darlenis Obregón	Colombia	11.78 w	Q
2	Ana Claudia Silva	Brazil	12.02 w	Q
3	Luciana Briozzo	Argentina	12.20 w	Q
	Daniela Riderelli	Chile	DNF	

Final – 10 November 19:00h - Wind: +1.9 m/s

Rank	Name	Nationality	Time	Notes
1st place, gold medalist(s)	Darlenis Obregón	Colombia	11.73	
2nd place, silver medalist(s)	Yomara Hinestroza	Colombia	11.97	
3rd place, bronze medalist(s)	María Carolina Díaz	Chile	12.09	
4	Liliana Tantucci	Argentina	12.16	
5	Tatiane de Paula Ferraz	Brazil	12.21	
6	Ana Claudia Silva	Brazil	12.30	
7	Luciana Briozzo	Argentina	12.36	
8	Jéssica Perea	Ecuador	12.45	

=== 200 meters ===
Heat 1 – 12 November 10:20h - Wind: +1.9 m/s

Rank	Name	Nationality	Time	Notes
1	Darlenis Obregón	Colombia	24.16	Q
2	Érika Chávez	Ecuador	24.52	Q
3	Ana Claudia Silva	Brazil	24.57	Q
4	María Carolina Díaz	Chile	24.70	q
5	Liliana Tantucci	Argentina	24.74	

Heat 2 – 12 November 10:20h - Wind: +1.2 m/s

Rank	Name	Nationality	Time	Notes
1	Wilmary Álvarez	Venezuela	23.94	Q
2	María Alejandra Idrobo	Colombia	24.06	Q
3	Vanda Ferreira Gomes	Brazil	24.35	Q
4	Jéssica Perea	Ecuador	24.53	q
5	Luciana Briozzo	Argentina	25.43	

Final – 12 November 17:40h - Wind: +1.7 m/s

Rank	Name	Nationality	Time	Notes
1st place, gold medalist(s)	Darlenis Obregón	Colombia	23.23	
2nd place, silver medalist(s)	Wilmary Álvarez	Venezuela	23.56	
3rd place, bronze medalist(s)	Vanda Ferreira Gomes	Brazil	23.80	
4	María Alejandra Idrobo	Colombia	23.98	
5	Jéssica Perea	Ecuador	24.24	
6	Ana Claudia Silva	Brazil	24.54	
7	Érika Chávez	Ecuador	24.66	
8	María Carolina Díaz	Chile	25.12	

=== 400 meters ===
Final – 10 November 18:30h

Rank	Name	Nationality	Time	Notes
1st place, gold medalist(s)	María Alejandra Idrobo	Colombia	53.90	
2nd place, silver medalist(s)	Wilmary Álvarez	Venezuela	54.03	
3rd place, bronze medalist(s)	Ángela Alfonso	Venezuela	54.89	
4	Shirley Aragón	Colombia	55.03	
5	Higlecia Clariane Silva de Oliveira	Brazil	55.65	
6	Juliana Menéndez	Argentina	57.36	
7	Érika Chávez	Ecuador	57.45	
8	María Victoria Maldonado	Argentina	58.18	

=== 800 meters ===
Final – 10 November 18:10h

Rank	Name	Nationality	Time	Notes
1st place, gold medalist(s)	Muriel Coneo	Colombia	2:07.78	
2nd place, silver medalist(s)	Marcela Valeria Britos	Uruguay	2:08.97	
3rd place, bronze medalist(s)	Nicole Manríquez	Chile	2:09.84	
4	Gisiane Bertoni	Brazil	2:11.98	
5	María Julieta Fraguio	Argentina	2:12.51	
6	Diana Armas	Ecuador	2:13.96	
7	Débora Maria Savoldi	Brazil	2:14.27	
8	María Elizabet Aguilar	Argentina	2:16.03	

=== 1500 meters ===
Final – 11 November 17:50h

Rank	Name	Nationality	Time	Notes
1st place, gold medalist(s)	Muriel Coneo	Colombia	4:25.56	
2nd place, silver medalist(s)	Isabel Cristina Feliciano da Silva	Brazil	4:28.25	
3rd place, bronze medalist(s)	Sabine Leticia Heitling	Brazil	4:28.57	
4	Sandra Gabriela Amarillo	Argentina	4:30.32	
5	Eliana Vásquez	Chile	4:33.01	
6	María Julieta Fraguio	Argentina	4:36.10	
7	Rocío Huillca	Peru	4:37.61	
8	Rosa Ramos	Paraguay	4:52.81	

=== 5000 meters ===
Final – 10 November 17:30h

Rank	Name	Nationality	Time	Notes
1st place, gold medalist(s)	Lina María Arias	Colombia	16:52.04	
2nd place, silver medalist(s)	Nadia Rodríguez	Argentina	16:54.31	
3rd place, bronze medalist(s)	Sandra Gabriela Amarillo	Argentina	16:57.48	
4	Zuleima Amaya	Venezuela	17:04.35	
5	Zenaide Vieira	Brazil	17:11.75	
6	Inés Melchor	Peru	17:16.39	
7	Johana Riveros	Colombia	17:20.13	
8	Karina Villazana	Peru	17:27.93	
9	Michele Cristina das Chagas	Brazil	17:29.35	
10	Claudia Ramírez	Uruguay	18:00.72	NR

=== 10,000 meters ===
Final – 11 November 19:20h

Rank	Name	Nationality	Time	Notes
1st place, gold medalist(s)	Lina María Arias	Colombia	35:16.74	
2nd place, silver medalist(s)	Zuleima Amaya	Venezuela	35:17.89	
3rd place, bronze medalist(s)	Nadia Rodríguez	Argentina	35:32.48	
4	Inés Melchor	Peru	35:57.85	
5	Johana Riveros	Colombia	36:00.92	
6	Andrea Noelia Latapie	Argentina	37:25.92	
	Zenaide Vieira	Brazil	DNF	
	Karina Villazana	Peru	DNF	

=== 3000 meters steeplechase ===
Final – 12 November 16:30h

Rank	Name	Nationality	Time	Notes
1st place, gold medalist(s)	Ángela Figueroa	Colombia	10:29.35	
2nd place, silver medalist(s)	Sabine Leticia Heitling	Brazil	10:37.38	
3rd place, bronze medalist(s)	Ingrid Galloso	Chile	10:50.46	
4	Rocío Huillca	Peru	10:56.90	
5	Gisela Benso	Argentina	11:59.62	
6	Lorena Ferrari	Argentina	12:11.46	
7	Gerlane Iara da Silva	Brazil	12:21.80	

=== 100 meters hurdles ===
Final – 10 November 16:20h - Wind: +1.9 m/s

Rank	Name	Nationality	Time	Notes
1st place, gold medalist(s)	Soledad Andrea Donzino	Argentina	13.78	
2nd place, silver medalist(s)	Fabiana dos Santos Moraes	Brazil	14.30	
3rd place, bronze medalist(s)	Giselle Marculino de Albuquerque	Brazil	14.43	
4	Ljubica Milos	Chile	14.73	
5	Agustina Zerboni	Argentina	15.19	

=== 400 meters hurdles ===
Final – 11 November 10:00h

Rank	Name	Nationality	Time	Notes
1st place, gold medalist(s)	Higlecia Clariane Silva de Oliveira	Brazil	60.88	
2nd place, silver medalist(s)	Keila Escobar	Colombia	61.74	
3rd place, bronze medalist(s)	Daisy Ugarte	Bolivia	61.95	
4	María Ignacia MacAuliffe	Chile	63.09	
5	Soledad Bellucci	Argentina	63.89	
6	Karina Caicedo	Ecuador	64.43	

=== High jump ===
Final – 12 November 16:10h

Rank	Name	Nationality	Attempts													Result	Notes
Rank	Name	Nationality	1.55	1.60	1.65	1.68	1.71	1.74	1.77	1.79	1.81	1.83	1.85	1.87	1.89	Result	Notes
1st place, gold medalist(s)	Marielis Rojas	Venezuela	-	-	o	o	o	o	o	o	o	o	xxo	xxo	xxx	1.87	
2nd place, silver medalist(s)	Caterine Ibargüen	Colombia	-	-	-	-	o	o	o	o	o	o	o	xxx		1.85	
3rd place, bronze medalist(s)	Daiana Sturtz	Argentina	-	o	o	o	o	o	xo	xxo	xxx					1.79	
4	Monica Araújo Freitas	Brazil	-	-	-	o	o	o	xxx							1.74	
5	Marcia Regina Evers	Brazil	-	o	o	o	xo	xo	xxx							1.74	
6	María Emilia Eberhardt	Argentina	-	o	o	o	o	xxx								1.71	
7	Gabriela Saravia	Peru	-	o	xxo	xxo	xxx									1.68	

=== Pole vault ===
Final – 10 November 17:00h

Rank	Name	Nationality	Attempts										Result	Notes
Rank	Name	Nationality	3.40	3.60	3.70	3.80	3.90	3.95	4.00	4.10	4.15	4.20	Result	Notes
1st place, gold medalist(s)	Keisa Monterola	Venezuela	-	-	-	-	o	-	o	xo	-	xxx	4.10	
2nd place, silver medalist(s)	Milena Agudelo	Colombia	-	-	-	o	xo	-	o	xxo	-	xxx	4.10	
3rd place, bronze medalist(s)	Patricia Gabriela dos Santos	Brazil	-	-	-	xo	xo	-	o	xxo	xxx		4.10	
4	Karla Rosa da Silva	Brazil	-	-	o	o	xx-	x					3.80	
5	Valeria Chiaraviglio	Argentina	xo	xo	xxx								3.60	

=== Long jump ===
Final – 10 November 10:30h

Rank	Name	Nationality	Attempts						Result	Notes
Rank	Name	Nationality	1	2	3	4	5	6	Result	Notes
1st place, gold medalist(s)	Caterine Ibargüen	Colombia	6.04 (-0.3)	6.32 (+1.1)	5.99 (-1.6)	-	-	-	6.32 (+1.1 m/s)	
2nd place, silver medalist(s)	Tânia Ferreira da Silva	Brazil	5.98 (+0.1)	x	6.05 (-1.2)	x	-	x	6.05 (-1.2 m/s)	
3rd place, bronze medalist(s)	Patrícia Venâncio	Brazil	5.73 (-2.1)	x	6.01 w (+2.9)	5.66 (-2.7)	5.60 (-2.8)	5.59 (-1.8)	6.01 w (+2.9 m/s)	
4	Mirian Quiñones	Ecuador	x	x	5.14 (+0.1)	5.74 (-1.5)	5.68 (0)	5.64 (-2.5)	5.74 (-1.5 m/s)	
5	Jazmín Córdoba	Colombia	5.69 (+1.9)	5.38 (+1.6)	5.25 (+1.1)	5.21 (-0.1)	4.42 (-4.0)	-	5.69 (+1.9 m/s)	
6	Macarena Reyes	Chile	5.63 (0)	x	5.62 w (+2.5)	x	5.57 (-2.4)	x	5.63 (0 m/s)	
7	María Emilia Eberhardt	Argentina	5.33 (+0.7)	5.37 (+1.8)	5.37 w (+2.2)	5.50 (-2.9)	5.25 (-2.8)	5.05 (-2.5)	5.50 (-2.9 m/s)	
8	Marisol Frigerio	Argentina	5.30 (+0.2)	x	x	x	x	x	5.30 (+0.2 m/s)	

=== Triple jump ===
Final – 11 November 18:15h

Rank	Name	Nationality	Attempts						Result	Notes
Rank	Name	Nationality	1	2	3	4	5	6	Result	Notes
1st place, gold medalist(s)	Tânia Ferreira da Silva	Brazil	13.24 w (+2.9)	12.93 (+0.4)	13.14 w (+2.1)	13.35 (+1.8)	13.27 (+0.7)	x	13.35 (+1.8 m/s)	
2nd place, silver medalist(s)	Caterine Ibargüen	Colombia	13.03 (+0.1)	13.03 (+1.6)	13.20 (+0.8)	13.26 w (+2.5)	12.94 (-2.0)	13.15 w (+2.2)	13.26 w (+2.5 m/s)	
3rd place, bronze medalist(s)	Mayra Pachito	Ecuador	x	12.55 (+1.1)	12.37 (-0.6)	12.61 (+0.7)	x	12.40 (+1.0)	12.61 (+0.7 m/s)	
4	Jazmín Córdoba	Colombia	11.99 (+0.9)	12.34 (+0.7)	11.97 w (+2.4)	12.16 (+1.8)	12.58 w (+2.5)	12.24 (+1.1)	12.58 w (+2.5 m/s)	
5	Macarena Reyes	Chile	12.11 (+0.9)	12.37 (+1.9)	12.38 (+1.4)	12.21 w (+2.4)	12.31 (+1.3)	12.27 (+1.6)	12.38 (+1.4 m/s)	
6	Karla Cristina de Souza	Brazil	12.31 (+1.9)	11.97 (+1.0)	x	11.82 (+1.0)	11.71 (-0.4)	11.79 (+1.1)	12.31 (+1.9 m/s)	
7	Marisol Frigerio	Argentina	11.94 w (+2.1)	x	11.86 (+0.9)	x	11.61 (+0.1)	x	11.94 w (+2.1 m/s)	
8	Verónica Desimoni	Argentina	11.75 (+0.5)	11.75 w (+2.4)	x	x	x	11.88 w (+2.8)	11.88 w (+2.8 m/s)	
	Verónica Davis	Venezuela	x	-	-				NM	

=== Shot put ===
Final – 11 November 19:00h

Rank	Name	Nationality	Attempts						Result	Notes
Rank	Name	Nationality	1	2	3	4	5	6	Result	Notes
1st place, gold medalist(s)	Natalia Ducó	Chile	14.94	16.36	15.82	15.26	15.59	15.55	16.36	
2nd place, silver medalist(s)	Ahymará Espinoza	Venezuela	15.01	14.92	14.80	15.05	15.06	14.60	15.06	
3rd place, bronze medalist(s)	Keely Christinne Medeiros	Brazil	x	14.57	14.10	x	13.85	14.07	14.57	
4	Regiane Rodrigues Alves	Brazil	x	14.12	14.25	14.56	x	x	14.56	
5	Paola Cheppi	Argentina	14.13	14.14	14.28	14.41	13.80	13.63	14.41	
6	Eli Johana Moreno	Colombia	13.54	13.74	13.62	13.53	-	-	13.74	

=== Discus throw ===
Final – 12 November 17:00h

Rank	Name	Nationality	Attempts						Result	Notes
Rank	Name	Nationality	1	2	3	4	5	6	Result	Notes
1st place, gold medalist(s)	Karen Gallardo	Chile	44.32	x	49.43	45.42	52.01	45.67	52.01	
2nd place, silver medalist(s)	Bárbara Rocío Comba	Argentina	37.73	x	47.62	48.08	x	47.94	48.08	
3rd place, bronze medalist(s)	Lisângela da Cruz	Brazil	42.68	44.26	x	46.19	43.60	43.06	46.19	
4	Eli Johana Moreno	Colombia	44.67	43.62	36.87	41.97	41.68	43.14	44.67	
5	Paola Cheppi	Argentina	x	x	43.10	36.26	40.05	x	43.10	
6	Keely Christinne Medeiros	Brazil	42.26	x	42.69	42.13	x	42.41	42.69	
7	Rosa Rodríguez	Venezuela	x	36.20	36.94	40.59	39.43	38.56	40.59	

=== Hammer throw ===
Final – 10 November 18:55h

Rank	Name	Nationality	Attempts						Result	Notes
Rank	Name	Nationality	1	2	3	4	5	6	Result	Notes
1st place, gold medalist(s)	Jennifer Dahlgren	Argentina	64.05	63.35	61.43	66.34	63.43	66.48	66.48	
2nd place, silver medalist(s)	Eli Johana Moreno	Colombia	61.64	x	59.77	58.87	x	x	61.64	
3rd place, bronze medalist(s)	Rosa Rodríguez	Venezuela	59.44	x	57.65	59.21	55.16	59.77	59.77	
4	Marynna Karolyna de Jesus	Brazil	48.98	57.22	56.36	52.87	55.66	57.03	57.22	
5	Gisela Figueiredo Cardozo	Brazil	52.19	53.84	53.11	53.17	51.70	x	53.84	
6	Eugenia Mariel Martínez	Argentina	49.77	48.94	x	48.39	50.49	49.15	50.49	

=== Javelin throw ===
Final – 11 November 16:20h

Rank	Name	Nationality	Attempts						Result	Notes
Rank	Name	Nationality	1	2	3	4	5	6	Result	Notes
1st place, gold medalist(s)	Diana Rivas	Colombia	x	x	50.91	x	47.33	x	50.91	
2nd place, silver medalist(s)	Yusbeli Parra	Venezuela	44.66	48.88	46.54	47.38	46.06	48.53	48.88	
3rd place, bronze medalist(s)	Juliana da Silva de Sousa	Brazil	46.55	43.71	x	43.35	42.03	45.59	46.55	
4	Maria do Carmo Ramos	Brazil	42.79	45.83	45.62	43.81	x	42.24	45.83	
5	Katryna Subeldia	Paraguay	43.46	x	42.75	43.39	43.10	45.20	45.20	
6	Natalia Fornero	Argentina	39.01	39.59	x	37.56	-	-	39.59	
7	Antonella Ramognini	Argentina	37.26	x	36.71	35.10	x	37.88	37.88	

=== Heptathlon ===
Final – 12 November 20:00h

The highest mark recorded in each event is highlighted in yellow

Rank	Name	Nationality	100m H	HJ	SP	200m	LJ	JT	800m	Points	Notes
1st place, gold medalist(s)	Jailma Sales de Lima	Brazil	14.73 (1.2); 878pts	1.64; 783pts	10.66; 573pts	24.56 (2.2); 928pts	5.69 (3.5); 756pts	39.59; 659pts	2:27.30; 727pts	5304	
2nd place, silver medalist(s)	Madelene Rondón	Venezuela	14.51 (1.2); 907pts	1.67; 818pts	9.71; 510pts	24.67 (2.2); 917pts	5.61 (2.9); 732pts	31.19; 499pts	2:15.72; 883pts	5266	
3rd place, bronze medalist(s)	Mirian Quiñones	Ecuador	15.20 (1.2); 815pts	1.58; 712pts	10.27; 547pts	25.86 (2.2); 809pts	6.01 (2.2); 853pts	36.87; 607pts	2:37.51; 602pts	4945	
4	Ana Camila Pirelli	Paraguay	15.21 (1.2); 814pts	1.52; 644pts	10.85; 585pts	26.29 (2.2); 772pts	5.12 (1.5); 592pts	34.90; 570pts	2:36.33; 616pts	4593	
5	Tamiris de Souza Delfino	Brazil	16.35 (1.2); 672pts	1.55; 678pts	10.94; 591pts	27.40 (2.2); 679pts	5.31 (4.4); 645pts	36.93; 608pts	2:47.03; 495pts	4368	
6	Agustina Zerboni	Argentina	15.33 (1.2); 799pts	1.46; 577pts	10.28; 548pts	26.87 (2.2); 723pts	5.34 (3.7); 654pts	29.09; 459pts	2:38.65; 588pts	4348	

=== 20 kilometers walk ===
Final – 11 November 7:30h

Rank	Name	Nationality	Time	Notes
1st place, gold medalist(s)	Luz Leidy Villamarin	Colombia	1:39:53.1	
1st place, gold medalist(s)	Yadira Guamán	Ecuador	1:39:53.1	
2nd place, silver medalist(s)	Magaly Andrade	Ecuador	1:48:26.0	
3rd place, bronze medalist(s)	Josette Sepúlveda	Chile	1:52:26.3	
4	Daiana Belén Luján	Argentina	2:03:22.1	
	Elianay Santana Pereira	Brazil	DQ	IAAF Rule 230
	Cristiane Martini	Brazil	DQ	IAAF Rule 230

=== 4x100 meters relay ===
Final – 10 November 20:30h

Rank	Nation	Competitors	Time	Notes
1st place, gold medalist(s)	Colombia	Nelcy Caicedo; María Alejandra Idrobo; Darlenis Obregón; Yomara Hinestroza	45.14	
2nd place, silver medalist(s)	Chile	Stephanie Matute; María Fernanda Mackenna; Daniela Riderelli; María Carolina Díaz	46.63	
3rd place, bronze medalist(s)	Venezuela	María Tereza Navas; Wilmary Álvarez; Ángela Alfonso; Luisely Jiménez	46.80	
4	Argentina	Juliana Menéndez; Luciana Briozzo; Soledad Andrea Donzino; Liliana Tantucci	47.11	
5	Ecuador	Karina Caicedo; Érika Chávez; Mayra Pachito; Jéssica Perea	47.29	
6	Brazil	Ana Claudia Silva; Fabiana dos Santos Moraes; Tatiane de Paula Ferraz; Patrícia Venâncio	47.43	

=== 4x400 meters relay ===
Final – 12 November 20:00h

Rank	Nation	Competitors	Time	Notes
1st place, gold medalist(s)	Venezuela	Luisely Jiménez; Ángela Alfonso; María Tereza Navas; Wilmary Álvarez	3:41.30	
2nd place, silver medalist(s)	Colombia	Darlenis Obregón; Shirley Aragón; Kelly López; María Alejandra Idrobo	3:41.92	
3rd place, bronze medalist(s)	Ecuador	Diana Armas; Jéssica Perea; Karina Caicedo; Érika Chávez	3:45.77	
4	Chile	Fernanda Mackenna; Stephanie Matute; María Ignacia MacAuliffe; Nicole Manríquez	3:46.22	
5	Brazil	Ana Claudia Silva; Gisiane Bertoni; Jailma Sales de Lima; Higlecia Clariane Silva de Oliveira	3:46.29	
6	Argentina	Juliana Menéndez; María Elizabet Aguilar; Rocío Games; María Victoria Maldonado	3:52.37	

== Note ==
The names of the Brazilian athletes were completed using the published list of participants.
