= Jhon Murillo (triple jumper) =

Colombian triple jumper (born 1984)

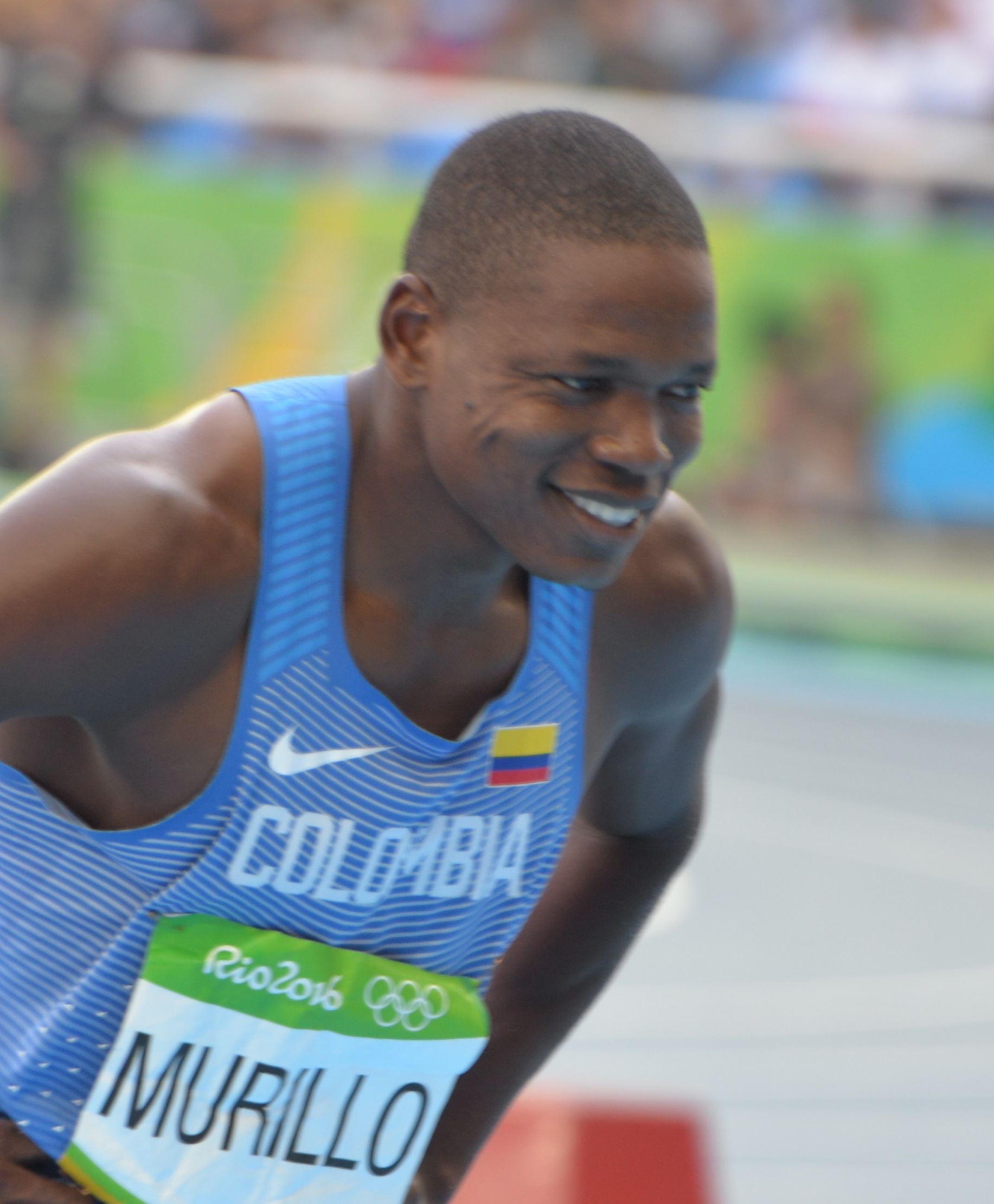
- Jhon Murillo in the triple jump final at olympic games in Rio 2016

Personal information
- Born: June 13, 1984 (age 42) Apartadó, Colombia
- Height: 1.83 m (6 ft 0 in)
- Weight: 84 kg (185 lb)

Sport
- Sport: Athletics
- Event(s): Triple jump, long jump

Jhon Fredy Murillo Murillo (born 13 June 1984) is a Colombian athlete specialising in the triple jump. He has won multiple medals on regional level.

His personal bests in the event is 16.74 metres (-1.6 m/s) set in Medellín in 2016. This is the current national record. In addition he has a personal best of 7.63 metres in the long jump (+1.0 m/s, Bogotá 2009).

== International competitions ==
Year	Competition	Venue	Position	Event	Notes
Representing Colombia
2006	South American Championships	Tunja, Colombia	6th	Long jump	6.93 m
2006	South American Championships	Tunja, Colombia	3rd	Triple jump	16.33 m (w)
2006	South American Games / South American U23 Championships	Buenos Aires, Argentina	3rd	Triple jump	15.48 m
2007	South American Championships	São Paulo, Brazil	9th	Long jump	7.01 m
2007	South American Championships	São Paulo, Brazil	4th	Triple jump	15.52 m
2008	Central American and Caribbean Championships	Cali, Colombia	4th	Triple jump	16.02 m
2009	Bolivarian Games	Sucre, Bolivia	1st	4 × 100 m relay	39.25 s
2009	Bolivarian Games	Sucre, Bolivia	2nd	Triple jump	16.20 m
2011	South American Championships	Buenos Aires, Argentina	–	Long jump	NM
2011	South American Championships	Buenos Aires, Argentina	–	Triple jump	NM
2012	Ibero-American Championships	Barquisimeto, Venezuela	6th	Triple jump	16.14 m (w)
2013	South American Championships	Cartagena, Colombia	7th	Long jump	7.46 m (w)
2013	South American Championships	Cartagena, Colombia	2nd	Triple jump	16.36 m (w)
2013	Bolivarian Games	Trujillo, Peru	1st	Triple jump	16.75 m (w)
2014	South American Games	Santiago, Chile	9th	Long jump	7.23 m
2014	South American Games	Santiago, Chile	3rd	Triple jump	16.27 m
2014	Ibero-American Championships	São Paulo, Brazil	4th	Triple jump	16.15 m
2014	Pan American Sports Festival	Mexico City, Mexico	6th	Triple jump	16.42 m
2014	Central American and Caribbean Games	Xalapa, Mexico	5th	Triple jump	16.19 m
2015	South American Championships	Lima, Peru	1st	Triple jump	16.55 m
2015	Pan American Games	Toronto, Canada	10th	Triple jump	16.08 m
2016	Ibero-American Championships	Rio de Janeiro, Brazil	2nd	Triple jump	16.35 m
2016	Olympic Games	Rio de Janeiro, Brazil	5th	Triple jump	17.09 m
2017	Bolivarian Games	Santa Marta, Colombia	1st	Triple jump	16.16 m
2018	South American Games	Cochabamba, Bolivia	4th	Triple jump	16.16 m
2018	Central American and Caribbean Games	Barranquilla, Colombia	8th	Triple jump	16.09 m (w)
