= Rolando Saquipay =

Ecuadorian race walker

Personal information
- Full name: Jaime Rolando Saquipay Pañi
- Born: 21 July 1979 (age 46) Baños, Azuay, Ecuador
- Height: 1.65 m (5 ft 5 in)
- Weight: 58 kg (128 lb)

Sport
- Country: Ecuador
- Sport: Men's Athletics
- Event: Race walking

Achievements and titles
- Olympic finals: 2004 Summer Olympics; 2008 Summer Olympics
Medal record
Men's race walking
Representing Ecuador
Bolivarian Games
Gold medal – first place	2005 Armenia	20 km
Silver medal – second place	2009 Sucre	20 km
Bronze medal – third place	2001 Ambato	50 km
- Updated on 15 May 2014

Jaime Rolando Saquipay Pañi (born 21 July 1979) is an Ecuadorian race walker.

== Personal bests ==
=== Track walk ===
- 10,000 m: 41:00.9 min (ht) – Quito, Ecuador, 16 May 2009
- 20,000 m: 1:22:55.4 hrs (ht) – Cali, Colombia, 22 July 2005

=== Road walk ===
- 10 km: 41:51 min – Loja, Ecuador, 12 March 2006
- 20 km: 1:19:21 hrs – Lima, Peru, 7 May 2005
- 35 km: 2:43:48 hrs – Portoviejo, Ecuador, 13 February 2011
- 50 km: 3:50:19 hrs – Taicang, China, 3 May 2014

== Achievements ==
Year	Competition	Venue	Position	Event	Notes
Representing Ecuador
2001	Pan American Race Walking Cup	Cuenca, Ecuador	—	50 km	DSQ
2001	Bolivarian Games	Ambato, Ecuador	3rd	50 km	4:40:37 A
2002	South American Race Walking Championships	Puerto Saavedra, Chile	3rd	35 km	2:55:51
2003	Pan American Race Walking Cup	Chula Vista, United States	8th	20 km	1:26:37 hrs
2003	Pan American Race Walking Cup	Chula Vista, United States	2nd	Team (20 km)	13 pts
2003	South American Championships	Barquisimeto, Venezuela	4th	20,000m track walk	1:32:14.04
2004	South American Race Walking Championships	Los Ángeles, Chile	1st	20 km	1:22:29 hrs
2004	South American Race Walking Championships	Los Ángeles, Chile	2nd	Team (20 km)	12 pts
2004	Olympic Games	Athens, Greece	17th	20 km	1:24:07
2004	World Race Walking Cup	Naumburg, Germany	12th	20 km	1:20:47 PB
2004	World Race Walking Cup	Naumburg, Germany	2nd	Team (20 km)	35 pts
2005	Pan American Race Walking Cup	Lima, Peru	1st	20 km	1:19:21
2005	Pan American Race Walking Cup	Lima, Peru	1st	Team (20 km)	16 pts
2005	South American Championships	Cali, Colombia	2nd	20,000m	1:22:55.4
2005	World Championships	Helsinki, Finland	—	20 km	DSQ
2005	Bolivarian Games	Armenia, Colombia	1st	20 km	1:22:51 GR A
2006	South American Race Walking Championships	Cochabamba, Bolivia	—	20 km	DQ/DNF
2006	World Race Walking Cup	A Coruña, Spain	29th	20 km	1:23:30 hrs
2006	World Race Walking Cup	A Coruña, Spain	7th	Team (20 km)	68 pts
2006	Ibero-American Championships	Ponce, Puerto Rico	1st	20,000m	1:28:48.36
2007	Pan American Games	Rio de Janeiro, Brazil	2nd	20 km	1:23:28
2007	World Championships	Osaka, Japan	12th	20 km	1:25:03
2007	South American Championships	São Paulo, Brazil	2nd	20,000m	1:25:55.2
2008	South American Race Walking Championships	Cuenca, Ecuador	2nd	20 km	1:25:41 hrs A
2008	South American Race Walking Championships	Cuenca, Ecuador	2nd	Team (20 km)	16 pts
2008	World Race Walking Cup	Cheboksary, Russia	12th	20 km	1:20:40 hrs
2008	World Race Walking Cup	Cheboksary, Russia	10th	Team (20 km)	98 pts
2008	Olympic Games	Beijing, China	20th	20 km	1:22:32
2009	World Championships	Berlin, Germany	23rd	20 km	1:23:51 SB
2009	Bolivarian Games	Sucre, Bolivia	2nd	20 km	1:32.06 A
2010	South American Race Walking Championships	Cochabamba, Bolivia	1st	20 km	1:24:50 hrs A
2010	South American Race Walking Championships	Cochabamba, Bolivia	1st	Team (20 km)	10 pts
2010	World Race Walking Cup	Chihuahua, Mexico	–	20 km	DNF
2010	World Race Walking Cup	Chihuahua, Mexico	10th	Team (20 km)	130 pts
2011	Pan American Race Walking Cup	Envigado, Colombia	3rd	50 km	4:01:20 hrs
2011	ALBA Games	Barquisimeto, Venezuela	1st	20,000m track walk	1:28:20.2 hrs (ht)
2011	Pan American Games	Guadalajara, Mexico	4th	20 km	1:22:57 hrs A
2011	Pan American Games	Guadalajara, Mexico	–	50 km	DNF
2012	South American Race Walking Championships	Salinas, Ecuador	4th	20 km	1:25:56.2
2012	South American Race Walking Championships	Salinas, Ecuador	2nd	Team (20 km)	18 pts
2012	World Race Walking Cup	Saransk, Russia	52nd	20 km	1:26:37 hrs
2012	World Race Walking Cup	Saransk, Russia	16th	Team (20 km)	189 pts
2013	Pan American Race Walking Cup	Guatemala City, Guatemala	11th	20 km	1:29:30 min A
2013	Pan American Race Walking Cup	Guatemala City, Guatemala	3rd	Team (20 km)	52 pts
2013	South American Championships	Cartagena, Colombia	6th	20,000m track walk	1:30:29.40
2013	World Championships	Moscow, Russia	18th	20 km	1:24:01
2013	Bolivarian Games	Trujillo, Peru	7th	20 km	1:32:02
2014	South American Race Walking Championships	Cochabamba, Bolivia	1st	20 km	1:26:36
2014	World Race Walking Cup	Taicang, China	12th	50 km	3:50:19
2015	Pan American Race Walking Cup	Arica, Chile	12th	20 km	1:25:10
2015	Pan American Race Walking Cup	Arica, Chile	4th	Team (20 km)	42 pts
2015	South American Championships	Lima, Peru	—	20,000m walk	DNF
