= Johana Moreno =

Colombian hammer thrower (born 1985)

Personal information
- Full name: Eli Johana Moreno Valencia
- Born: 15 April 1985 (age 41) Carepa, Antioquia, Colombia
- Height: 1.77 m (5 ft 9 1/2 in)
- Weight: 93 kg (205 lb)

Sport
- Country: Colombia
- Sport: Women's Athletics
- Event: Hammer throw

Achievements and titles
- Personal bests: Shot put: 15.61 m (2005); Discus: 45.95 (2005); Hammer throw: 69.80 NR (2009)
Medal record
Women's athletics
Representing Colombia
Central American and Caribbean Games
Gold medal – first place	2010 Mayagüez	Hammer throw
Bronze medal – third place	2006 Cartagena	Hammer throw
Bolivarian Games
Gold medal – first place	2009 Sucre	Hammer throw
Bronze medal – third place	2005 Armenia	Shot put
Bronze medal – third place	2005 Armenia	Hammer throw
South American Championships
Gold medal – first place	2007 São Paulo	Hammer throw
Gold medal – first place	2009 Lima	Hammer throw
Silver medal – second place	2005 Cali	Hammer throw
Silver medal – second place	2006 Tunja	Hammer throw
Silver medal – second place	2011 Buenos Aires	Hammer throw
- Updated on 9 January 2015

Eli Johana Moreno Valencia (born 15 April 1985) is a Colombian track and field athlete who specialises in the hammer throw. She represented her country at the 2008 Summer Olympics and 2012 Summer Olympics, and the 2009 World Championships in Athletics. She is the Colombian record holder in the hammer with a best throw of 69.80, making her the second best South American thrower after Jennifer Dahlgren.

She is a two-time South American Champion and was runner-up in 2005 and 2006. She has also won two bronze medals at the Central American and Caribbean Championships, as well as a bronze at the 2006 Central American and Caribbean Games.

== Career ==
She won her first continental medal at the 2005 South American Championships in Athletics, where she was runner-up to Jennifer Dahlgren but managed to improve the Colombian national record to 61.65 m. The following year she won a bronze medal at the 2006 Central American and Caribbean Games, setting a new record of 65.51 m. At the 2006 South American Championships in Athletics she was again behind Dahlgren at continental level and took the silver medal with a throw of 64.94 m. She ended the year with another silver behind Dahlgren at the 2006 South American Games which doubled as the Under-23 continental championships.

She achieved a season's best of 64.40 m to win the hammer at the Grand Prix Colombiano, where she also took the silver in the shot put with a throw of 14.05 m. Moreno obtained her first South American title at the 2007 South American Championships in Athletics, winning the hammer in São Paulo. She also took part in the 2007 Pan American Games that year and was eighth in hammer.

She made a strong start to the outdoor season in 2008, setting a new national record of 67.09 m to take the bronze at the 2008 Central American and Caribbean Championships. She improved this further at the Colombian Grand Prix in Bogotá, recording a mark of 68.00 m. She was selected to represent her country at the Olympics for the first time at the 2008 Beijing Games. She threw 64.66 m in the qualifiers and did not progress to the final.

Moreno began 2009 with an improvement to 69.80 m in March at the Grand Prix Sudamericano in Santa Fe, Argentina, making her the second best South American hammer thrower after Dahlgren. She won her second continental title at the 2009 South American Championships in Athletics with a throw of 65.79 m, and then took the bronze at the 2009 CAC Championships behind Cuban Arasay Thondike and improving Venezuelan Rosa Rodríguez. She attended her second global event – the 2009 World Championships in Athletics – but her throw of 65.05 m was again not enough to make the final.

In 2010, Moreno's best throw (in hammer throw) was 66.98 metres of which she achieved at the Central American and Caribbean Games. She received 1st place in the games after throwing further than the Venezuelan record holder, Rosa Rodriguez. Moreno competed in no other major competitions in 2010.

2011 was a more successful year for Moreno than the previous year, placing 1st at the Central American and Caribbean Championships for the first time (bronze in 2008 and 2009) and achieving second at the South American Championships behind accomplished athlete, Jennifer Dahlgren. Moreno also competed at the Pan American Games coming 12th place with a throw of 59.23 metres. Her best throw was 68.53 metres which she did at the Central American and Caribbean Championships. It was also her best throw since 2009.

== Personal bests ==
Event	Best (m)	Venue	Date
Shot put	15.61 m A	Bogotá, Colombia	28 May 2005
Discus throw	45.95 m A	Bogotá, Colombia	28 May 2005
Hammer throw	69.80 m NR	Santa Fe, Argentina	29 March 2009

- All information taken from IAAF profile.

== Major competition record ==
Year	Competition	Venue	Position	Event	Notes
Representing Colombia
2002	South American Youth Championships	Asunción, Paraguay	4th	Shot	13.03 m
2002	South American Youth Championships	Asunción, Paraguay	2nd	Discus	41.34 m
2002	South American Youth Championships	Asunción, Paraguay	2nd	Hammer	49.63 m
2005	South American Championships	Cali, Colombia	2nd	Hammer	61.65 m
2005	Bolivarian Games	Armenia, Colombia	3rd	Shot	13.99 m A
2005	Bolivarian Games	Armenia, Colombia	3rd	Hammer	59.99 m A
2006	Central American and Caribbean Games	Cartagena, Colombia	3rd	Hammer	65.51 m (NR)
2006	South American Championships	Tunja, Colombia	4th	Shot	14.17 m A
2006	South American Championships	Tunja, Colombia	7th	Discus	41.39 m A
2006	South American Championships	Tunja, Colombia	2nd	Hammer	64.94 m A
2006	South American U23 Championships / South American Games	Buenos Aires, Argentina	6th	Shot put	13.74 m
2006	South American U23 Championships / South American Games	Buenos Aires, Argentina	4th	Discus	44.67 m
2006	South American U23 Championships / South American Games	Buenos Aires, Argentina	2nd	Hammer	61.64 m
2007	ALBA Games	Caracas, Venezuela	3rd	Hammer	61.20 m
2007	South American Championships	São Paulo, Brazil	6th	Shot	13.81 m
2007	South American Championships	São Paulo, Brazil	1st	Hammer	61.93 m
2007	Pan American Games	Rio de Janeiro, Brazil	8th	Hammer	62.77 m
2008	Ibero-American Championships	Iquique, Chile	4th	Hammer	62.49 m
2008	Central American and Caribbean Championships	Cali, Colombia	3rd	Hammer	67.09 m
2008	Olympic Games	Beijing, China	36th (q)	Hammer	64.66 m
2009	South American Championships	Lima, Peru	1st	Hammer	65.79 m
2009	Central American and Caribbean Championships	Havana, Cuba	3rd	Hammer	67.66 m
2009	World Championships	Berlin, Germany	31st (q)	Hammer	65.05 m
2009	Bolivarian Games	Sucre, Bolivia	1st	Hammer	69.65 m GR A
2010	Central American and Caribbean Games	Mayagüez, Puerto Rico	1st	Hammer	66.98 m
2011	South American Championships	Buenos Aires, Argentina	2nd	Hammer	68.53 m
2011	Central American and Caribbean Championships	Mayagüez, Puerto Rico	1st	Hammer	67.97 m
2011	Pan American Games	Guadalajara, Mexico	12th	Hammer	59.23 m A
2012	Ibero-American Championships	Barquisimeto, Venezuela	3rd	Hammer	68.58 m
2012	Olympic Games	London, United Kingdom	18th (q)	Hammer	68.53 m
2013	South American Championships	Cartagena, Colombia	2nd	Hammer	67.22 m
2013	Bolivarian Games	Trujillo, Peru	2nd	Hammer	66.59 m
2014	South American Games	Santiago, Chile	3rd	Hammer	65.58 m
2014	Ibero-American Championships	São Paulo, Brazil	2nd	Hammer	66.01 m
2014	Pan American Sports Festival	Mexico City, Mexico	7th	Hammer	64.13 m A
2014	Central American and Caribbean Games	Xalapa, Mexico	3rd	Hammer	67.77 m A
2015	South American Championships	Lima, Peru	2nd	Hammer	66.05 m
2017	South American Championships	Asunción, Paraguay	3rd	Hammer	63.09 m
2017	Bolivarian Games	Santa Marta, Colombia	2nd	Hammer	62.17 m
2018	South American Games	Cochabamba, Bolivia	5th	Hammer	64.64 m
2018	Central American and Caribbean Games	Barranquilla, Colombia	4th	Hammer	60.83 m
