= Athletics at the 2009 Bolivarian Games =

Athletics at the XVI Bolivarian Games
- Dates: November 22–26, 2009
- Host city: Sucre, Bolivia
- Venue: Estadio Olímpico Patria
- Level: Senior
- Events: 47 (24 men, 23 women)
- Participation: at least 155 athletes from 5 nations
- Records set: 7 games records

Athletics at the 2009 Bolivarian Games was held at the Estadio Olímpico Patria in Sucre, Bolivia, between November 22–26, 2009. A total of 47 events were contested, 24 by men and 23 by women. In total, 7 games records were set or equaled.

== Medal summary ==
The official webpage is no longer available.

Medal winners below were compiled from a variety of sources.

All results are marked as "affected by altitude" (A), because the stadium in Sucre is situated 2820 m above sea level.

=== Men ===
Event	Gold		Silver		Bronze	
100 metres	Daniel Grueso (COL)	10.27 GR A	Arturo Ramírez (VEN)	10.28 A	Luis Morán (ECU)	10.31 A
200 meters	Arturo Ramírez (VEN)	20.78 A	Daniel Grueso (COL)	20.79 A	Lenin Cubillán (VEN)	21.31 A
400 meters	Alberto Aguilar (VEN)	46.54 A	Omar Longart (VEN)	46.74 A	Freddy Mezones (VEN)	46.97 A
800 meters	Nico Herrera (VEN)	1:51.75 A	Rafith Rodríguez (COL)	1:55.37 A	Julio Alfredo Pérez (PER)	1:59.57 A
1500 meters	Bayron Piedra (ECU)	3:50.53 A	Nico Herrera (VEN)	3:53.92 A	Mario Bazán (PER)	3:54.70 A
5000 meters	Bayron Piedra (ECU)	15:05.1 A	Jhon Cusi (PER)	15:09.1 A	William Naranjo (COL)	15:10.4 A
10,000 meters	Bayron Piedra (ECU)	31:07.10 A	William Naranjo (COL)	31:18.45 A	Jorge Aruquipa (BOL)	31:19.32 A
Half Marathon	Diego Colorado (COL)	1:09:25 A	Rolando Pillco (BOL)	1:10:30 A	Franklin Tenorio (ECU)	1:10:30 A
110 meter hurdles	Paulo Villar (COL)	13.64 A	Albert Bravo (VEN)	13.89 A	Jorge McFarlane (PER)	14.36 A
400 meter hurdles	Yeison Rivas (COL)	50.67 A	Víctor Solarte (VEN)	51.83 A	Emerson Chala (ECU)	52.35 A
3000 m steeplechase	Mario Bazán (PER)	9.29.04 A	Gerardo Villacrés (ECU)	9.46.75 A	Gregorio Peña (VEN)	10.04.90 A
4×100 meter relay	Colombia; Jhon Valoyes; Paulo Villar; Jhon Murillo; Daniel Grueso	39.25 GR A	Venezuela; Víctor Castillo; Arturo Ramírez; Diego Rivas; Ronald Amaya	39.73 A	Ecuador; Diego Ferrín; Luis Morán; Hugo Chila; Franklin Nazareno	39.80 A
4×400 meter relay	Venezuela; Freddy Mezones; Omar Longart; Alberto Aguilar; Albert Bravo	3:06.91 A	Colombia; Juan Pablo Maturana; Geiner Mosquera; Yeison Rivas; Jhon Valoyes	3:10.93 A	Ecuador; Emerson Chala; Gerardo Correa; Luis Caicedo; Lenin Flores	3:19.29 A
20 km race walk	Luis Fernando López (COL)	1:28.09 A	Rolando Saquipay (ECU)	1:32.06 A	Mauricio Arteaga (ECU)	1:37.07 A
50 km race walk	Mesías Zapata (ECU)	4:24:07 A	Néstor Rueda (COL)	4:25.27 A	David Guevara (ECU)	4:36.22 A
High jump	Albert Bravo (VEN)	2.22 A	Wanner Miller (COL)	2.22 A	Diego Ferrín (ECU); Arturo Chávez (PER)	2.05 A
Pole vault	Víctor Medina (COL)	5.10 =GR A	César González (VEN)	4.80 A	Oscar Mina (ECU)	3.60 A
Long jump	Víctor Castillo (VEN)	8.25 GR A	Hugo Chila (ECU)	8.16 A	Jorge McFarlane (PER)	8.10 A
Triple jump	Hugo Chila (ECU)	17.03 GR A (0.3 m/s)	Jhon Murillo (COL)	16.20 A (0.5 m/s)	José Sornoza (ECU)	16.03 A
Shot put	Eder Moreno (COL)	18.29 A	Yojer Medina (VEN)	17.56 A	Jesus Parejo (VEN)	17.54 A
Discus throw	Jesús Parejo (VEN)	55.98 A	Julio César Londoño (COL)	53.89 A	Michael Putman (PER)	53.31 A
Hammer throw	Aldo Bello (VEN)	64.79 A	Pedro Muñoz (VEN)	62.73 A	Guillermo Braulio (ECU)	57.71 A
Javelin throw	Dayron Márquez (COL)	73.70 A	Noraldo Palacios (COL)	71.64 A	Jhonatan Davis (VEN)	56.29 A
Decathlon	William Valor (VEN)	7330 A	Jhonatan Davis (VEN)	7281 A	Oscar Mina (ECU)	6621 A

=== Women ===
Event	Gold		Silver		Bronze	
100 metres	Darlenys Obregón (COL)	11.44 A	Prisciliana Chourio (VEN)	11.59 A	Nelcy Caicedo (COL)	11.75 A
200 meters	Darlenys Obregón (COL)	23.19 A	Norma González (COL)	23.50 A	Erika Chávez (ECU)	23.65 A
400 meters	Lucy Jaramillo (ECU)	52.9 A	Jennifer Padilla (COL)	53.9 A	Wilmary Álvarez (VEN)	54.0 A
800 meters	Rosibel García (COL)	2:10.00 A	Muriel Coneo (COL)	2:10.66 A	Daisy Ugarte (BOL)	2:10.87 A
1500 meters	Rosibel García (COL)	4:45.66 A	Muriel Coneo (COL)	4:45.96 A	Raquel Acosta (ECU)	4:46.75 A
5000 meters	Inés Melchor (PER)	17:42.95 A	Julia Rivera (PER)	17:57.05 A	Rosa Chacha (ECU)	18:32.04 A
10,000 meters	Inés Melchor (PER)	36:00.62 A	Rosa Chacha (ECU)	36:54.21 A	Rosmery Quispe (BOL)	38:12.31 A
Half Marathon	Jemena Misayauri (PER)	1:20:45 A	Yolanda Fernández (COL)	1:21:42 A	Nelby Sánchez (BOL)	1:24:46 A
100 meter hurdles	Brigitte Merlano (COL)	13.35 A	Lina Flórez (COL)	13.43 A	Ada Hernández (VEN)	14.16 A
400 meter hurdles	Lucy Jaramillo (ECU)	57.77 A	Princesa Oliveros (COL)	58.12 A	Magdalena Mendoza (VEN)	60.44 A
3000 m steeplechase	Ángela Figueroa (COL)	11:06.48 A	Marlene Acuña (ECU)	11:25.92 A	Rocío Huillca (PER)	12.10.71 A
4×100 meter relay	Colombia; Nelcy Caicedo; Lina Flórez; Brigitte Merlano; Darlenys Obregón	43.96 A	Venezuela; Nercely Soto; Prisciliana Chourio; Lexabeth Hidalgo; Nancy Garcés	44.98 A	Ecuador; Erika Chávez; Germania Caicedo; Liliana Núñez; María Ruiz	46.28 A
4×400 meter relay	Colombia; Kelly López; Darlenys Obregón; Jennifer Padilla; Muriel Coneo	3:39.06 A	Venezuela; Yenny Mejías; Ydanis Navas; Magdalena Mendoza; Wilmary Álvarez	3:39.06. A	Ecuador; Erika Chávez; María Corozo; Liliana Núñez; Lucy Jaramillo	3:41.42 A
20 km race walk	Johana Ordóñez (ECU)	1:44.37 A	Geovana Irusta (BOL)	1:44.38 A	Sandra Zapata (COL)	1:47.12 A
High jump	Caterine Ibargüen (COL)	1.80 A	Gabriela Saravia (PER)	1.73 A	Guillercy González (VEN)	1.60 A
Pole vault^{†}	Keisa Monterola (VEN)	4.00 A	Milena Agudelo (COL)	4.00 A		
Long jump	Caterine Ibargüen (COL)	6.32 A (-0.4 m/s)	Verónica Davis (VEN)	6.14 A (-1.0 m/s)	Munich Tovar (VEN)	6.10 A w (2.6 m/s)
Triple jump	Verónica Davis (VEN)	13.97 GR A	Caterine Ibargüen (COL)	13.96 A	Munich Tovar (VEN)	12.87 A
Shot put	Luz Dary Castro (COL)	16.37 A	Ahymará Espinoza (VEN)	16.32 A	Rosa Rodríguez (VEN)	14.32 A
Discus throw	María Cubillán (VEN)	51.04 A	Luz Dary Castro (COL)	49.66 A	Rosa Rodríguez (VEN)	39.72 A
Hammer throw	Johana Moreno (COL)	69.65 GR A	Rosa Rodríguez (VEN)	66.98 A	Zuleyma Mina (ECU)	53.36 A
Javelin throw	Zuleima Araméndiz (COL)	51.81 A	Thaimara Rivas (VEN)	41.40 A	Rubí Mercado (ECU)	41.18 A
Heptathlon	Thaimara Rivas (VEN)	5142 A	Guillercy González (VEN)	4809 A	Nasli Perea (COL)	4797 A

==== Notes ====
^{†}: One source lists María Ruiz from Ecuador as bronze medalist in pole vault (without indicating any height or result). However, other sources say that she did not show or there is no indication for any attempt or height achieved. Therefore, she was not considered in the medal list.

== Medal table (unofficial) ==
* Host nation (Bolivia)

Rank	Nation	Gold	Silver	Bronze	Total
1	Colombia (COL)	22	19	4	45
2	Venezuela (VEN)	13	18	13	44
3	Ecuador (ECU)	8	5	19	32
4	Peru (PER)	4	3	7	14
5	Bolivia (BOL)*	0	2	4	6
Totals (5 entries)		47	47	47	141

== Participation ==
According to an unofficial count through incomplete result lists, at least 155 athletes from 5 countries participated.

- Bolivia (at least 27)
- Colombia (at least 41)
- Ecuador (at least 32)
- (Peru) Perú (at least 16)
- Venezuela (at least 39)
