= Athletics at the 2002 South American Games – Results =

These are the full results of the athletics competition at the 2002 South American Games also serving as the 2002 South American Junior Championships in Athletics. The event took place between August 1 and August 3, 2002, at Estádio Olímpico do Pará in Belém, Brazil.

== Differences between South American Games and South American Junior Championships ==
In contrast to the South American Junior Championships, there is a quorum for the South American Games: participation of at least 5 athletes from at least 3 countries is required. If the quorum requirement is not met for an event, only one medal per country is awarded. The following events were affected: no bronze medal in men's 3000m steeplechase, no bronze medal in women's discus throw, and no silver medal in women's javelin throw.

While the Olympic Committees of Aruba and the Netherlands Antilles (until dissolution) are affiöiated to ODESUR, their corresponding athletics federations (Arubaanse Atletiek Bond and Nederlands Antilliaanse Atletiek Unie) are affiliated to the North American, Central American and Caribbean Athletic Association rather than CONSUDATLE. Their athletes compete at the South American Games, but not at the South American Junior Championships. The performances of Churandy Martina in the finals winning the gold medal in men's 100 m and the silver medal in men's 200 m were reported. Further details could not be retrieved.

== Men's results ==
=== 100 meters ===
Heat 1 – 1 August - Wind: +1.5 m/s

Rank	Name	Nationality	Time	Notes
1	Eliezer de Almeida	Brazil	10.56	Q
2	Keith Roberts	Guyana	10.75	Q
3	Pablo Colville	Chile	10.82	Q
4	Arnold Amaya	Venezuela	10.89	q
5	Federico Satler	Argentina	11.02	
6	Louis Tristán	Peru	11.30	

Heat 2 – 1 August - Wind: +1.3 m/s

Rank	Name	Nationality	Time	Notes
1	Bruno Pacheco	Brazil	10.52	Q
2	Diego Valdés	Chile	10.81	Q
3	José Manuel Garaventa	Argentina	10.85	q
4	Facundo Troche	Paraguay	11.21	
5	Yirvis Herrera	Venezuela	11.29	

Final – 1 August - Wind: +0.8 m/s

Rank	Name	Nationality	Time	Notes
	Churandy Martina	Netherlands Antilles	10.42	Gold medal at South American Games
1st place, gold medalist(s)	Bruno Pacheco	Brazil	10.50	Silver medal at South American Games
2nd place, silver medalist(s)	Eliezer de Almeida	Brazil	10.60	Bronze medal at South American Games
3rd place, bronze medalist(s)	Pablo Colville	Chile	10.77	4th at South American Games
4	Keith Roberts	Guyana	10.78	5th at South American Games
5	José Manuel Garaventa	Argentina	10.97	6th at South American Games
6	Arnold Amaya	Venezuela	10.97	7th at South American Games
7	Diego Valdés	Chile	10.98	

=== 200 meters ===
Heat 1 – 3 August - Wind: +2.6 m/s

Rank	Name	Nationality	Time	Notes
1	Bruno Pacheco	Brazil	20.77 w	Q
2	Kael Becerra	Chile	21.91 w	Q
3	Facundo Troche	Paraguay	22.62 w	

Heat 2 – 3 August - Wind: +1.8 m/s

Rank	Name	Nationality	Time	Notes
1	Ronald Amaya Herrera	Venezuela	21.44	Q
2	Jorge Sena	Brazil	21.45	Q
3	Andrés Silva	Uruguay	21.78	Q
4	Pablo Heredia	Argentina	21.89	q
5	Nicolás Sepúlveda	Chile	22.30	q
	Keith Roberts	Guyana	DQ	IAAF Rule 163.3

Final – 3 August - Wind: +1.1 m/s

Rank	Name	Nationality	Time	Notes
1st place, gold medalist(s)	Bruno Pacheco	Brazil	20.54	
	Churandy Martina	Netherlands Antilles	20.81	Silver medal at South American Games
2nd place, silver medalist(s)	Jorge Sena	Brazil	21.18	Bronze medal at South American Games
3rd place, bronze medalist(s)	Kael Becerra	Chile	21.46	4th at South American Games
4	Ronald Amaya Herrera	Venezuela	21.49	5th at South American Games
5	Andrés Silva	Uruguay	21.63	6th at South American Games
6	Pablo Heredia	Argentina	21.77	7th at South American Games
	Nicolás Sepúlveda	Chile	DNF	

=== 400 meters ===
Heat 1 – 1 August

Rank	Name	Nationality	Time	Notes
1	Andrés Silva	Uruguay	47.9	Q
2	Tai Payne	Guyana	48.7	Q
3	Kevin Balzán	Venezuela	48.8	Q
4	Sebastián Lasquera	Argentina	49.0	q
5	Andrés Carchi	Ecuador	49.3	q

Heat 2 – 1 August

Rank	Name	Nationality	Time	Notes
1	Luís Ambrósio	Brazil	47.4	Q
2	Luis Luna	Venezuela	48.0	Q
3	Pablo Heredia	Argentina	49.2	Q
4	Ricardo Hurtado	Bolivia	49.7	
5	Francisco Aguirre	Ecuador	57.6	

Final – 1 August

Rank	Name	Nationality	Time	Notes
1st place, gold medalist(s)	Luís Ambrósio	Brazil	46.51	
2nd place, silver medalist(s)	Luis Luna	Venezuela	46.82	
3rd place, bronze medalist(s)	Andrés Silva	Uruguay	47.50	
4	Tai Payne	Guyana	48.35	
5	Kevin Balzán	Venezuela	49.24	
6	Sebastián Lasquera	Argentina	49.50	
7	Pablo Heredia	Argentina	49.57	
8	Andrés Carchi	Ecuador	49.93	

=== 800 meters ===
Final – 2 August

Rank	Name	Nationality	Time	Notes
1st place, gold medalist(s)	Cristián Matute	Ecuador	1:50.99	
2nd place, silver medalist(s)	Tai Payne	Guyana	1:51.05	
3rd place, bronze medalist(s)	Thiago Chyaromont	Brazil	1:51.66	
4	Kleberson Davide	Brazil	1:51.81	
5	Nico Herrera	Venezuela	1:53.23	
6	Evans Pinto	Bolivia	1:54.36	
7	Nelwis Castro	Venezuela	1:55.63	
8	Óscar Reddes	Paraguay	1:58.65	

=== 1500 meters ===
Final – 3 August

Rank	Name	Nationality	Time	Notes
1st place, gold medalist(s)	Cleyton Aguiar	Brazil	3:53.48	
2nd place, silver medalist(s)	Nico Herrera	Venezuela	3:55.67	
3rd place, bronze medalist(s)	Alex Lopes	Brazil	3:55.68	
4	Diego Moreno	Peru	3:57.16	
5	Nelwis Castro	Venezuela	4:03.28	
6	Evans Pinto	Bolivia	4:03.30	
7	Cristián Matute	Ecuador	4:03.67	
8	Cristián Patiño	Ecuador	4:03.86	
9	Fredy Aguilar	Chile	4:13.23	
10	Óscar Reddes	Paraguay	4:23.14	

=== 5000 meters ===
Final – 1 August

Rank	Name	Nationality	Time	Notes
1st place, gold medalist(s)	Fernando Fernandes	Brazil	14:13.29	
2nd place, silver medalist(s)	Franck de Almeida	Brazil	14:14.18	
3rd place, bronze medalist(s)	Delvis Sánchez	Venezuela	14:53.51	
4	John Cusi	Peru	14:55.98	
5	Segundo Pastuña	Ecuador	15:28.05	
6	Danny Cornieles	Venezuela	15:36.04	
7	Cleveland Forde	Guyana	15:46.74	
8	Fausto Sandoval	Ecuador	16:05.24	

=== 10,000 meters ===
Final – 3 August

Rank	Name	Nationality	Time	Notes
1st place, gold medalist(s)	Franck de Almeida	Brazil	29:39.25	
2nd place, silver medalist(s)	Delvis Sánchez	Venezuela	31:22.78	
3rd place, bronze medalist(s)	Gilialdo Koball	Brazil	31:38.64	
4	John Cusi	Peru	32:42.60	
5	Fausto Sandoval	Ecuador	33:01.44	
6	Segundo Pastuña	Ecuador	33:35.51	
	Danny Cornieles	Venezuela	DNF	
	Cleveland Forde	Guyana	DNF	

=== 3000 meters steeplechase ===
Final – 2 August

Rank	Name	Nationality	Time	Notes
1st place, gold medalist(s)	Fernando Fernandes	Brazil	8:59.76	
2nd place, silver medalist(s)	Diego Moreno	Peru	9:08.34	
3rd place, bronze medalist(s)	Rodolfo Hass	Brazil	9:20.70	No medal at South American Games
4	Cristián Patiño	Ecuador	9:32.07	

=== 110 meters hurdles ===
Final – 3 August - Wind: +1.5 m/s

Rank	Name	Nationality	Time	Notes
1st place, gold medalist(s)	Thiago Dias	Brazil	13.94	
2nd place, silver medalist(s)	Leandro Peyrano	Argentina	15.03	
3rd place, bronze medalist(s)	Cristóbal Lyon	Chile	15.34	
4	Ricardo Hurtado	Bolivia	15.99	
	Rodrigo Pereira	Brazil	DNF	

=== 400 meters hurdles ===
Heat 1 – 2 August

Rank	Name	Nationality	Time	Notes
1	Raphael Fernandes	Brazil	53.03	Q
2	Tomás Tagle	Chile	54.16	Q
3	José Pignataro	Argentina	54.36	Q
4	Juan Martín Rivero	Uruguay	54.96	q
5	John Tamayo	Ecuador	55.44	
6	Ángel Rodríguez	Venezuela	57.71	

Heat 2 – 2 August

Rank	Name	Nationality	Time	Notes
1	Dayvison da Silva	Brazil	53.99	Q
2	Pablo Schilling	Chile	54.52	Q
3	Leandro Peyrano	Argentina	54.74	Q
4	Ricardo Hurtado	Bolivia	55.26	q
5	Andrés Carchi	Ecuador	55.67	

Final – 2 August

Rank	Name	Nationality	Time	Notes
1st place, gold medalist(s)	Raphael Fernandes	Brazil	52.85	
2nd place, silver medalist(s)	Dayvison da Silva	Brazil	53.31	
3rd place, bronze medalist(s)	Pablo Schilling	Chile	53.52	
4	José Pignataro	Argentina	53.64	
5	Leandro Peyrano	Argentina	54.31	
6	Tomás Tagle	Chile	54.42	
7	Ricardo Hurtado	Bolivia	55.13	
8	Juan Martín Rivero	Uruguay	55.79	

=== High jump ===
Final – 2 August

Rank	Name	Nationality	Result	Notes
1st place, gold medalist(s)	Fábio Baptista	Brazil	2.07	
2nd place, silver medalist(s)	Luis Conde	Venezuela	2.04	
3rd place, bronze medalist(s)	Francisco Tamariz	Ecuador	2.01	
4	Ederson de Oliveira	Brazil	2.01	

=== Pole vault ===
Final – 3 August

Rank	Name	Nationality	Result	Notes
1st place, gold medalist(s)	Fábio da Silva	Brazil	5.10	
2nd place, silver medalist(s)	José Francisco Nava	Chile	4.90	
3rd place, bronze medalist(s)	Daniel Gabriel	Brazil	4.60	
4	Guillermo Chiaraviglio	Argentina	4.50	
4	Leandro Peyrano	Argentina	4.50	

=== Long jump ===
Final – 2 August

Rank	Name	Nationality	Attempts						Result	Notes
Rank	Name	Nationality	1	2	3	4	5	6	Result	Notes
1st place, gold medalist(s)	Thiago Dias	Brazil	7.60 (0.0)	x	7.61 (1.4)	-	x	7.92 (0.6)	7.92 (+0.6 m/s)	
2nd place, silver medalist(s)	Marcos Trivelato	Brazil	7.07 (0.8)	x	x	7.13 (1.3)	7.30 (0.7)	x	7.30 (+0.7 m/s)	
3rd place, bronze medalist(s)	Louis Tristán	Peru	7.18 (-0.1)	7.20 (0.5)	x	3.82 (1.0)	7.10 (1.6)	6.61 (1.0)	7.20 (+0.5 m/s)	
4	Pablo Schulz	Chile	7.19 (-0.6)	x	x	x	x	x	7.19 (-0.6 m/s)	
5	Orlando Acosta	Venezuela	x	6.90 (-0.6)	6.94 (1.4)	6.96 (1.2)	6.98 (0.9)	4.91 (0.9)	6.98 (+0.9 m/s)	
6	Óscar Alvarenga	Paraguay	6.31 (0.9)	6.24 (0.2)	6.42 (0.6)	6.37 (0.9)	6.54 (1.1)	6.27 (0.9)	6.54 (+1.1 m/s)	
7	Bernardo Vallejo	Ecuador	x	6.44 (0.1)	x	x	x	x	6.44 (+0.1 m/s)	

=== Triple jump ===
Final – 3 August

Rank	Name	Nationality	Attempts						Result	Notes
Rank	Name	Nationality	1	2	3	4	5	6	Result	Notes
1st place, gold medalist(s)	Leonardo dos Santos	Brazil	x	15.73 (0.8)	x	x	15.78 (0.0)	15.97 (0.1)	15.97 (+0.1 m/s)	
2nd place, silver medalist(s)	Thiago Dias	Brazil	x	15.21 (0.7)	-	-	15.55 (1.8)	x	15.55 (+1.8 m/s)	
3rd place, bronze medalist(s)	Francisco Castro	Chile	14.16 (0.5)	14.48 (0.5)	14.40 (0.8)	13.88 (0.3)	14.06 (n.a)	14.23 (0.1)	14.48 (+0.5 m/s)	
4	Bernardo Vallejo	Ecuador	x	14.21 (0.8)	x	13.80 (0.3)	14.14 (0.5)	x	14.21 (+0.8 m/s)	
5	Pablo Schulz	Chile	x	x	x	-	-	14.02 (0.2)	14.02 (+0.2 m/s)	
6	Óscar Alvarenga	Paraguay	13.69 (0.9)	x	x	13.65 (0.5)	13.24 (0.6)	x	13.69 (+0.9 m/s)	

=== Shot put ===
Final – 1 August
6 kg Junior implement

Rank	Name	Nationality	Attempts						Result	Notes
Rank	Name	Nationality	1	2	3	4	5	6	Result	Notes
1st place, gold medalist(s)	Gustavo de Mendonça	Brazil	17.34	17.34	x	x	x	17.71	17.71	
2nd place, silver medalist(s)	Germán Lauro	Argentina	15.74	17.56	17.54	17.10	17.31	16.44	17.56	
3rd place, bronze medalist(s)	Juan Jaramillo	Venezuela	15.41	16.41	16.64	16.15	17.26	17.08	17.26	
4	Clayton Santos	Brazil	15.74	16.54	x	x	16.05	x	16.54	
5	Gonzalo Riffo	Chile	x	x	15.81	15.79	x	15.79	15.81	

=== Discus throw ===
Final – 2 August
1.750 kg Junior implement

Rank	Name	Nationality	Attempts						Result	Notes
Rank	Name	Nationality	1	2	3	4	5	6	Result	Notes
1st place, gold medalist(s)	Gustavo de Mendonça	Brazil	x	50.85	46.14	50.89	52.78	46.71	52.78	
2nd place, silver medalist(s)	Germán Lauro	Argentina	47.90	49.18	52.44	50.90	51.35	51.34	52.44	
3rd place, bronze medalist(s)	Reginaldo Diogenes	Brazil	49.33	42.84	x	46.91	x	x	49.33	
4	Gonzalo Riffo	Chile	x	46.46	40.44	x	43.45	x	46.46	
5	Nicolás Infante	Chile	37.89	39.60	x	x	x	x	39.60	

=== Hammer throw ===
Final – 3 August
6 kg Junior implement

Rank	Name	Nationality	Attempts						Result	Notes
Rank	Name	Nationality	1	2	3	4	5	6	Result	Notes
1st place, gold medalist(s)	Fabián Di Paolo	Argentina	67.38	73.69	x	70.39	x	x	73.69	
2nd place, silver medalist(s)	Roberto Sáez	Chile	64.79	68.93	x	67.09	67.60	67.07	68.93	
3rd place, bronze medalist(s)	Wagner Domingos	Brazil	63.24	36.71	60.11	61.95	63.99	65.15	65.15	
4	Leandro Benetti	Argentina	59.56	63.76	x	x	63.23	54.82	63.76	
5	Danionison Sarquis	Brazil	51.93	51.64	51.98	53.77	54.72	55.62	55.62	

=== Javelin throw ===
Final – 1 August

Rank	Name	Nationality	Attempts						Result	Notes
Rank	Name	Nationality	1	2	3	4	5	6	Result	Notes
1st place, gold medalist(s)	Júlio de Oliveira	Brazil	62.24	62.45	x	61.42	61.42	62.87	63.49	
2nd place, silver medalist(s)	Marcelo Junckes	Brazil	x	57.12	x	58.34	58.38	61.42	61.42	
3rd place, bronze medalist(s)	José Palma	Venezuela	59.00	x	x	54.26	54.26	57.01	59.00	
4	Nicolás Infante	Chile	57.19	58.75	54.07	x	54.50	57.91	58.75	

=== Decathlon ===
Final
Junior implements (1995-2005)

The highest mark recorded in each event is highlighted in yellow

Rank	Name	Nationality	100m	LJ	SP	HJ	400m	110m H	DT	PV	JT	1500m	Points	Notes
1st place, gold medalist(s)	Fagner Martins	Brazil	11.41 (1.5); 771pts	6.76 (0.1); 757pts	14.12; 736pts	1.94; 749pts	52.95; 684pts	16.22 (-0.9); 708pts	40.17; 668pts	3.20; 406pts	47.70; 555pts	4:54.51; 592pts	6626	
2nd place, silver medalist(s)	Randy Gutiérrez	Venezuela	11.53 (1.5); 746pts	6.29 (0.6); 650pts	13.02; 668pts	1.79; 619pts	54.43; 622pts	17.61 (-0.9); 562pts	37.96; 623pts	3.90; 590pts	51.88; 616pts	4:47.56; 633pts	6329	
3rd place, bronze medalist(s)	Alcino dos Santos	Brazil	11.54 (1.5); 744pts	5.78 (0.8); 540pts	11.73; 590pts	1.88; 696pts	50.93; 772pts	16.34 (-0.9); 695pts	29.82; 461pts	3.70; 535pts	41.67; 466pts	4:35.46; 709pts	6208	
4	Matías López	Argentina	10.95 (1.5); 872pts	6.54 (0.1); 707pts	10.84; 536pts	1.91; 723pts	50.06; 812pts	15.69 (-0.9); 768pts	30.37; 472pts	NH; 0pts	39.93; 441pts	5:14.75; 478pts	5809	
5	Freddy Díaz	Venezuela	11.34 (1.5); 786pts	6.34 (0.3); 661pts	10.89; 539pts	1.73; 569pts	51.69; 738pts	20.56 (-0.9); 306pts	30.57; 476pts	3.80; 562pts	39.51; 435pts	4:36.76; 701pts	5773	

=== 10,000 meters walk ===
Final – 2 August

Rank	Name	Nationality	Time	Notes
1st place, gold medalist(s)	Rafael Duarte	Brazil	43:11.39	
2nd place, silver medalist(s)	Andrés Chocho	Ecuador	44:36.81	
3rd place, bronze medalist(s)	Carlos Borgoño	Chile	45:56.57	
4	Eben Ezer Churqui	Bolivia	46:55.87	
5	Dionisio Neira	Peru	47:03.00	
6	Cristián Bascuñán	Chile	47:52.03	
7	Vanderlei dos Santos	Brazil	50:46.34	
	Jorge Aguilar	Peru	DQ	IAAF Rule 230.1
	Juan Carlos Sandy	Bolivia	DQ	IAAF Rule 230.1
	Fillol Bayona	Venezuela	DQ	IAAF Rule 230.1

=== 4x100 meters relay ===
Final – 2 August

Rank	Nation	Competitors	Time	Notes
1st place, gold medalist(s)	Brazil	Bruno Pacheco; Eliezer de Almeida; Jorge Sena; Bruno Góes	39.64	
2nd place, silver medalist(s)	Chile	Pablo Colville; Diego Valdés; Kael Becerra; Nicolás Sepúlveda	41.22	
3rd place, bronze medalist(s)	Argentina	Federico Satler; José Manuel Garaventa; Pablo Heredia; Sebastián Lasquera	41.45	
	Venezuela	Arnold Amaya; Kevin Miguel; José Acevedo; Yirvis Herrera	DQ	IAAF Rule 170.14

=== 4x400 meters relay ===
Final – 3 August

Rank	Nation	Competitors	Time	Notes
1st place, gold medalist(s)	Brazil	Diego Venâncio; Luís Ambrósio; Thiago Chyaromont; Luiz Eduardo da Silva	3:06.68	
2nd place, silver medalist(s)	Venezuela	Nico Herrera; Luis Luna; Arnold Amaya; José Acevedo	3:11.20	
3rd place, bronze medalist(s)	Argentina	Sebastián Lasquera; Leandro Peyrano; José Pignataro; Matías López	3:14.16	
4	Chile	Kael Becerra; Nicolás Sepúlveda; Tomás Tagle; Pablo Schilling	3:18.28	
5	Ecuador	Francisco Aguirre; Andrés Carchi; John Tamayo; Cristián Matute	3:20.83	

== Women's results ==
=== 100 meters ===
Final – 1 August - Wind: +1.3 m/s

Rank	Name	Nationality	Time	Notes
1st place, gold medalist(s)	Thatiana Ignácio	Brazil	11.57	
2nd place, silver medalist(s)	Wilmary Álvarez	Venezuela	11.76	
3rd place, bronze medalist(s)	Evelyn dos Santos	Brazil	11.90	
4	Daniela Riderelli	Chile	12.03	
5	Fernanda Mackenna	Chile	12.33	
6	Yessica Bermúdez	Venezuela	12.34	
7	Luciana Lazet	Argentina	12.47	

=== 200 meters ===
Heat 1 – 3 August

Rank	Name	Nationality	Time	Notes
1	Evelyn dos Santos	Brazil	24.50	Q
2	Ángela Alfonso	Venezuela	24.52	Q
3	Daniela Riderelli	Chile	24.56	Q
4	Grace Arias	Ecuador	24.99	q

Heat 2 – 3 August

Rank	Name	Nationality	Time	Notes
1	Wilmary Álvarez	Venezuela	24.39	Q
2	Joyce Prieto	Brazil	25.03	Q
3	Fernanda Mackenna	Chile	25.21	Q
4	Luciana Lazet	Argentina	25.34	q
5	Mónica Ceballos	Ecuador	26.03	

Final – 3 August - Wind: +1.7 m/s

Rank	Name	Nationality	Time	Notes
1st place, gold medalist(s)	Wilmary Álvarez	Venezuela	23.85	
2nd place, silver medalist(s)	Joyce Prieto	Brazil	23.99	
3rd place, bronze medalist(s)	Evelyn dos Santos	Brazil	24.23	
4	Ángela Alfonso	Venezuela	24.45	
5	Daniela Riderelli	Chile	24.67	
6	Fernanda Mackenna	Chile	25.21	
7	Luciana Lazet	Argentina	25.54	
	Grace Arias	Ecuador	DNF	

=== 400 meters ===
Final – 1 August

Rank	Name	Nationality	Time	Notes
1st place, gold medalist(s)	Yusmelys García	Venezuela	54.38	
2nd place, silver medalist(s)	Joyce Prieto	Brazil	54.50	
3rd place, bronze medalist(s)	Ángela Alfonso	Venezuela	54.82	
4	Amanda Dias	Brazil	56.31	
5	Lucy Jaramillo	Ecuador	56.73	
6	Grace Arias	Ecuador	59.00	

=== 800 meters ===
Final – 2 August

Rank	Name	Nationality	Time	Notes
1st place, gold medalist(s)	Juliana de Azevedo	Brazil	2:06.01	
2nd place, silver medalist(s)	Jenny Mejías	Venezuela	2:10.58	
3rd place, bronze medalist(s)	Rejane da Silva	Brazil	2:14.93	
4	Gabriela Chalá	Ecuador	2:18.54	
5	Kamila Govorcin	Chile	2:18.88	
6	Jorgelina Litterini	Argentina	2:21.46	

=== 1500 meters ===
Final – 3 August

Rank	Name	Nationality	Time	Notes
1st place, gold medalist(s)	Eliana Vásquez	Chile	4:39.47	
2nd place, silver medalist(s)	Susana Aburto	Chile	4:41.16	
3rd place, bronze medalist(s)	Silvia Paredes	Ecuador	4:43.64	
4	Natalia Siviero	Argentina	4:44.61	
	Rejane da Silva	Brazil	DNF	
	Eliane Pereira	Brazil	DQ	Doping^{†}

^{†}: Eliane Pereira ranked initially 1st (4:33.19), but was disqualified later for infringement of IAAF doping rules.

=== 3000 meters ===
Final – 1 August

Rank	Name	Nationality	Time	Notes
1st place, gold medalist(s)	Nadia Rodríguez	Argentina	9:50.03	
2nd place, silver medalist(s)	Silvia Paredes	Ecuador	9:54.15	
3rd place, bronze medalist(s)	Inés Melchor	Peru	10:05.60	
4	Zenaide Vieira	Brazil	10:07.78	
5	Eliana Vásquez	Chile	10:18.95	
6	Elena Arias	Ecuador	10:20.55	
7	Susana Aburto	Chile	10:51.72	
	Eliane Pereira	Brazil	DQ	Doping ^{†}

^{†}: Eliane Pereira ranked initially 2nd (9:52.42), but was disqualified later for infringement of IAAF doping rules.

=== 5000 meters ===
Final – 2 August

Rank	Name	Nationality	Time	Notes
1st place, gold medalist(s)	Nadia Rodríguez	Argentina	17:08.23	
2nd place, silver medalist(s)	Silvia Paredes	Ecuador	17:16.88	
3rd place, bronze medalist(s)	Patricia Lobo	Brazil	17:33.13	
4	Inés Melchor	Peru	17:49.04	
5	Gabriela Oliveira	Brazil	18:20.57	

=== 3000 meters steeplechase ===
Final – 3 August

Rank	Name	Nationality	Time	Notes
1st place, gold medalist(s)	Sabine Heitling	Brazil	10:52.77	
2nd place, silver medalist(s)	Elena Arias	Ecuador	11:07.82	
3rd place, bronze medalist(s)	Soledad del Carlo	Argentina	11:12.88	
	Cintia dos Santos	Brazil	DNF	

=== 100 meters hurdles ===
Final – 3 August - Wind: -0.9 m/s

Rank	Name	Nationality	Time	Notes
1st place, gold medalist(s)	Janaína Sestrem	Brazil	13.94	
2nd place, silver medalist(s)	Sandrine Legenort	Venezuela	14.14	
3rd place, bronze medalist(s)	Soledad Donzino	Argentina	14.24	
4	Mônica de Freitas	Brazil	14.39	
5	Alejandra Llorente	Argentina	14.91	
6	Bárbara Tapía	Chile	15.43	

=== 400 meters hurdles ===
Final – 2 August

Rank	Name	Nationality	Time	Notes
1st place, gold medalist(s)	Yusmelys García	Venezuela	58.54	
2nd place, silver medalist(s)	Amanda Dias	Brazil	58.86	
3rd place, bronze medalist(s)	Raquel da Costa	Brazil	59.39	
4	Lucy Jaramillo	Ecuador	62.12	
5	Magdalena Sánchez	Chile	63.45	
6	Bárbara Tapía	Chile	64.34	
7	Gabriela Chalá	Ecuador	65.67	

=== High jump ===
Final – 1 August

Rank	Name	Nationality	Result	Notes
1st place, gold medalist(s)	Mônica de Freitas	Brazil	1.74	
2nd place, silver medalist(s)	Marielys Rojas	Venezuela	1.71	
3rd place, bronze medalist(s)	Daniela Carrillo	Chile	1.68	
3rd place, bronze medalist(s)	Jhoris Luque	Venezuela	1.68	
5	Francisca Ortíz	Ecuador	1.65	
6	Claribel Salinas	Bolivia	1.65	
7	Marcia Evers	Brazil	1.60	

=== Pole vault ===
Final – 2 August

Rank	Name	Nationality	Result	Notes
1st place, gold medalist(s)	Karla da Silva	Brazil	3.90	
2nd place, silver medalist(s)	Rosângela da Silva	Brazil	3.70	
3rd place, bronze medalist(s)	Alejandra Llorente	Argentina	3.60	
4	Pamela Barnert	Chile	3.40	
5	Luciana Sachetti	Argentina	3.40	
	Keisa Monterola	Venezuela	NH	

=== Long jump ===
Final – 2 August

Rank	Name	Nationality	Attempts						Result	Notes
Rank	Name	Nationality	1	2	3	4	5	6	Result	Notes
1st place, gold medalist(s)	Keila Costa	Brazil	5.98 (0.1)	x	6.30 (0.3)	6.16 (0.4)	4.29 (0.4)	6.37 (1.4)	6.37 (+1.4 m/s)	
2nd place, silver medalist(s)	Fernanda Gonçalves	Brazil	x	x	5.95 (0.5)	5.99 (0.3)	x	x	5.99 (+0.3 m/s)	
3rd place, bronze medalist(s)	Michelle Vaughn	Guyana	5.71 (0.2)	5.51 (-0.3)	5.77 (0.1)	5.79 (0.2)	5.88 (0.4)	x	5.88 (+0.4 m/s)	
4	Andrea Morales	Argentina	x	x	5.51 (0.4)	4.81 (0.0)	5.51 (0.7)	x	5.51 (+0.7 m/s)	
5	Natahalie Patiño	Argentina	x	x	x	x	5.34 (-0.5)	5.30 (0.6)	5.34 (-0.5 m/s)	
6	Daysi Ugarte	Bolivia	5.02 (0.0)	5.14 (-0.9)	x	4.84 (0.9)	4.93 (0.7)	4.94 (0.1)	5.14 (-0.9 m/s)	

=== Triple jump ===
Final – 1 August

Rank	Name	Nationality	Attempts						Result	Notes
Rank	Name	Nationality	1	2	3	4	5	6	Result	Notes
1st place, gold medalist(s)	Keila Costa	Brazil	x	13.78 (-0.5)	13.68 (0.8)	-	11.95 (-0.3)	13.21 (-0.1)	13.78 (-0.5 m/s)	
2nd place, silver medalist(s)	Fernanda Gonçalves	Brazil	11.51 (-0.4)	x	x	12.13 (-0.9)	11.73 (0.1)	12.26 (-0.6)	12.26 (-0.6 m/s)	
3rd place, bronze medalist(s)	Michelle Vaughn	Guyana	x	x	12.23 (-0.3)	12.12 (0.6)	11.95 (-0.3)	11.60 (-0.2)	12.23 (-0.3 m/s)	
4	Daysi Ugarte	Bolivia	11.22 (0.2)	11.60 (-0.3)	11.50 (-0.3)	12.02 (0.0)	11.64 (0.2)	11.23 (0.0)	12.02 (0.0 m/s)	
5	María Batallas	Ecuador	11.67 (-0.1)	11.84 (-0.5)	11.87 (-0.2)	11.33 (0.2)	11.65 (-0.1)	12.00 (-0.5)	12.00 (-0.5 m/s)	
	Claribel Salinas	Bolivia	x	x	x	x	x	x	NM	

=== Shot put ===
Final – 2 August

Rank	Name	Nationality	Attempts						Result	Notes
Rank	Name	Nationality	1	2	3	4	5	6	Result	Notes
1st place, gold medalist(s)	Ahymará Espinoza	Venezuela	13.97	12.86	13.67	x	x	x	13.97	
2nd place, silver medalist(s)	Jennifer Dahlgren	Argentina	13.21	12.68	13.02	13.22	x	13.61	13.61	
3rd place, bronze medalist(s)	Regiane Rodrigues Alves	Brazil	12.63	x	12.67	13.00	13.12	x	13.12	
4	Roberta Cristiane de Oliveira	Brazil	12.77	12.60	12.82	x	12.67	x	12.82	

=== Discus throw ===
Final – 3 August

Rank	Name	Nationality	Attempts						Result	Notes
Rank	Name	Nationality	1	2	3	4	5	6	Result	Notes
1st place, gold medalist(s)	Roberta Cristiane de Oliveira	Brazil	41.85	39.49	40.43	41.75	x	41.37	41.85	
2nd place, silver medalist(s)	Jennifer Dahlgren	Argentina	39.39	x	37.94	41.26	35.02	41.41	41.41	
3rd place, bronze medalist(s)	Roberta Campos Argentino	Brazil	36.97	40.09	x	40.70	x	40.64	40.70	No medal at South American Games

=== Hammer throw ===
Final – 1 August

Rank	Name	Nationality	Attempts						Result	Notes
Rank	Name	Nationality	1	2	3	4	5	6	Result	Notes
1st place, gold medalist(s)	Jennifer Dahlgren	Argentina	54.48	x	x	50.28	55.73	55.68	55.73	
2nd place, silver medalist(s)	Stefania Zoryez	Uruguay	47.14	48.64	50.54	49.53	x	49.17	50.54	
3rd place, bronze medalist(s)	Adriana Benaventa	Venezuela	x	50.19	46.96	41.65	x	43.30	50.19	
4	Fabiana dos Santos	Brazil	42.28	45.22	48.97	x	42.65	x	48.97	
5	Jaqueline Alegra	Brazil	x	44.16	x	x	43.96	42.81	44.16	

=== Javelin throw ===
Final – 2 August

Rank	Name	Nationality	Attempts						Result	Notes
Rank	Name	Nationality	1	2	3	4	5	6	Result	Notes
1st place, gold medalist(s)	Maria do Carmo Vitorio Alves Ramos	Brazil	43.18	43.06	40.07	40.30	40.26	45.31	45.31	
2nd place, silver medalist(s)	Maria Aparecida Gonçalves Cruz	Brazil	41.34	39.79	40.71	44.31	43.12	39.52	44.31	No medal at South American Games
3rd place, bronze medalist(s)	Adriana Benaventa	Venezuela	x	32.78	27.57	-	-	-	32.78	

=== Heptathlon ===
Final

The highest mark recorded in each event is highlighted in yellow

Rank	Name	Nationality	100m H	HJ	SP	200m	LJ	JT	800m	Points	Notes
1st place, gold medalist(s)	Soledad Donzino	Argentina	14.14 (0.6); 959pts	1.67; 818pts	10.77; 580pts	25.28 (1.0); 861pts	5.56 (0.4); 717pts	35.61; 583pts	2:35.92; 621pts	5139	
2nd place, silver medalist(s)	Macarena Reyes	Chile	15.37 (0.6); 793pts	1.52; 644pts	10.65; 572pts	25.75 (1.0); 819pts	5.56 (1.0); 717pts	25.30; 388pts	2:25.55; 750pts	4683	
3rd place, bronze medalist(s)	Bruna Gomes	Brazil	15.21 (0.6); 814pts	1.64; 783pts	9.87; 521pts	26.36 (1.0); 766pts	5.04 (0.2); 570pts	22.78; 341pts	2:26.25; 741pts	4536	
4	Fabiana da Silva	Brazil	15.39 (0.6); 791pts	1.49; 610pts	8.99; 464pts	25.87 (1.0); 809pts	5.32 (1.7); 648pts	26.22; 405pts	2:36.80; 610pts	4337	

=== 10,000 meters walk ===
Final – 2 August

Rank	Name	Nationality	Time	Notes
1st place, gold medalist(s)	Alessandra Picagevicz	Brazil	50:34.59	
2nd place, silver medalist(s)	Lizbeth Zúñiga	Peru	53:20.19	
3rd place, bronze medalist(s)	Josette Sepúlveda	Chile	55:13.41	
4	Johana Ordóñez	Ecuador	57:09.83	
	Cisiane Dutra	Brazil	DQ	IAAF Rule 230.1
	Juana Cachi	Peru	DQ	IAAF Rule 230.1
	Ariana Quino Salazar	Bolivia	DQ	IAAF Rule 230.1

=== 4x100 meters relay ===
Final – 2 August

Rank	Nation	Competitors	Time	Notes
1st place, gold medalist(s)	Brazil	Thatiana Ignácio; Evelyn dos Santos; Alessandra Joaquim; Mônica de Freitas	45.30	
2nd place, silver medalist(s)	Venezuela	Yessica Bermúdez; Ángela Alfonso; Wilmary Álvarez; Sandrine Legenort	45.58	
3rd place, bronze medalist(s)	Chile	Daniela Riderelli; Macarena Reyes; Fernanda Mackenna; Javiera Escobedo	47.11	
4	Argentina	Luciana Lazet; Soledad Donzino; Alejandra Llorente; Andrea Morales	47.79	
5	Ecuador	Gabriela Chalá; Mónica Ceballos; Grace Arias; Lucy Jaramillo	48.82	

=== 4x400 meters relay ===
Final – 3 August

Rank	Nation	Competitors	Time	Notes
1st place, gold medalist(s)	Brazil	Juliana de Azevedo; Amanda Dias; Raquel da Costa; Ana Souza	3:40.56	
2nd place, silver medalist(s)	Ecuador	Grace Arias; Lucy Jaramillo; Gabriela Chalá; Mónica Ceballos	3:45.70	
3rd place, bronze medalist(s)	Venezuela	Ángela Alfonso; Yusmelys García; Jenny Mejías; Sandrine Legenort	3:45.78	
4	Chile	Fernanda Mackenna; Magdalena Sánchez; Bárbara Tapía; Daniela Riderelli	3:49.09	
5	Argentina	Jorgelina Litterini; Nadia Rodríguez; Andrea Morales; Natalia Siviero	4:06.52	

== Note ==
It is reported that two further doping cases with enhanced Testosterone/Epitestosterone ratio were discovered (no medalists involved). Further details could not be retrieved.
