= Macarena Reyes =

Chilean athlete

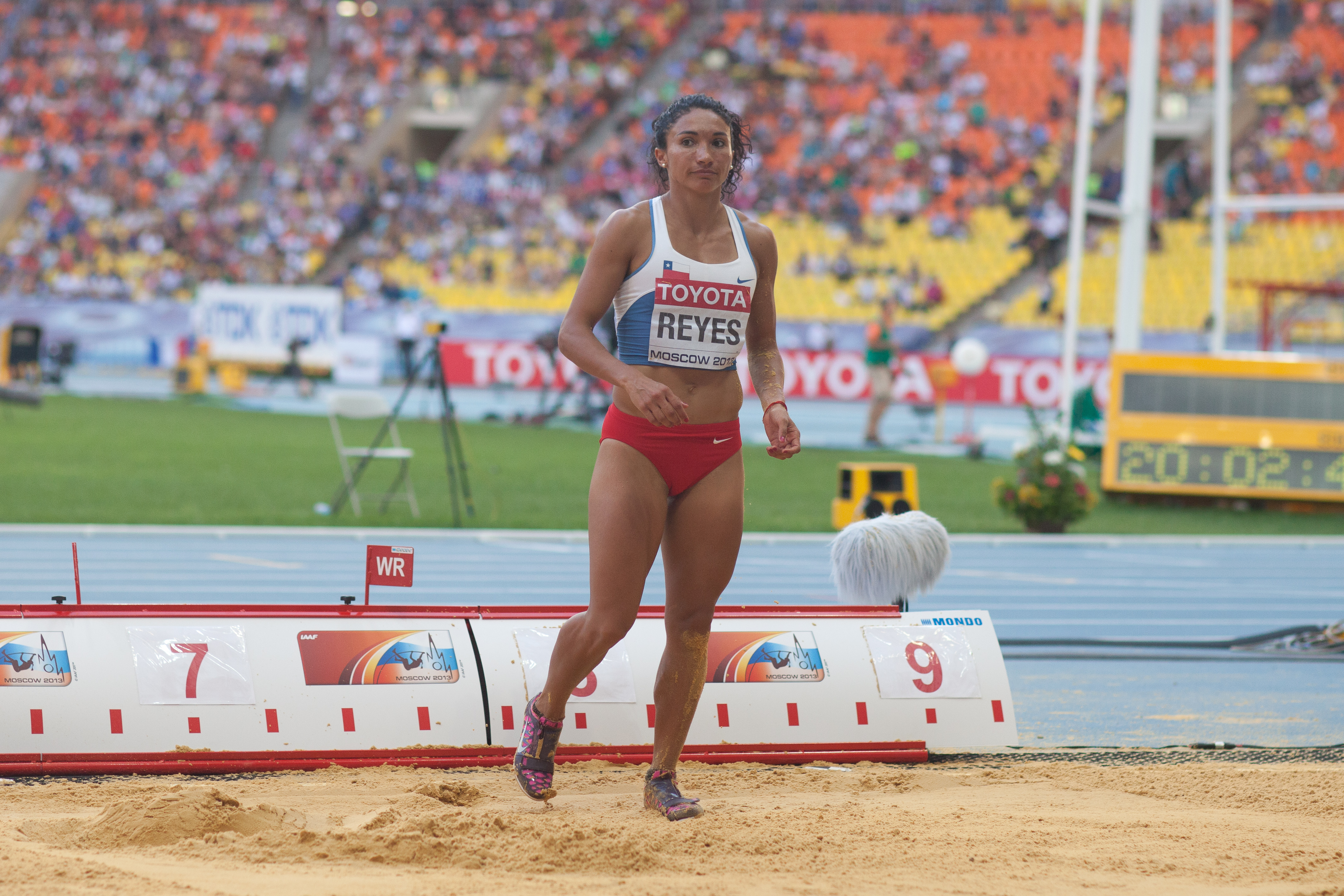
- Macarena Reyes during 2013 World Championships in Athletics in Moscow

Personal information
- Born: 30 March 1984 (age 41) San Fernando, Chile

Sport
- Sport: Track and field
- Event(s): Long jump Triple jump Heptathlon

Macarena Rocío Reyes Meneses (born 30 March 1984 in San Fernando, Chile) is a Chilean athlete who competes in the long jump and heptathlon.

She holds national records in the long jump, triple jump and heptathlon.

== Competition record ==
Year	Competition	Venue	Position	Event	Notes
Representing Chile
2000	South American Youth Championships	Bogotá, Colombia	6th	100 m hurdles	14.84 s
2000	South American Youth Championships	Bogotá, Colombia	2nd	Long jump	5.66 m
2001	World Youth Championships	Debrecen, Hungary	21st (q)	Long jump	5.42 m
2001	South American Junior Championships	Santa Fe, Argentina	4th	4 × 100 m relay	47.49 s
2001	South American Junior Championships	Santa Fe, Argentina	8th	Long jump	5.45 m
2002	South American Junior Championships / South American Games	Belém, Brazil	3rd	4 × 100 m relay	47.11 s
2002	South American Junior Championships / South American Games	Belém, Brazil	2nd	Heptathlon	4683 pts
2003	South American Championships	Barquisimeto, Venezuela	5th	4 × 400 m relay	3:45.72 min
2003	South American Championships	Barquisimeto, Venezuela	4th	Long jump	5.82 m
2003	South American Championships	Barquisimeto, Venezuela	8th	Triple jump	12.42 m
2003	South American Junior Championships	Guayaquil, Ecuador	1st	4 × 100 m relay	46.54 s
2003	South American Junior Championships	Guayaquil, Ecuador	4th	4 × 400 m relay	3:52.37 min
2003	South American Junior Championships	Guayaquil, Ecuador	1st	Long jump	6.10 m
2003	South American Junior Championships	Guayaquil, Ecuador	2nd	Triple jump	12.64 m (w)
2004	South American U23 Championships	Barquisimeto, Venezuela	4th	Long jump	6.00 m (-1.6 m/s)
2004	South American U23 Championships	Barquisimeto, Venezuela	6th	Triple jump	12.27 m (+1.0 m/s)
2004	Ibero-American Championships	Huelva, Spain	10th	Long jump	5.56 m
2005	South American Championships	Cali, Colombia	7th	Triple jump	12.84 m
2006	South American U23 Championships / South American Games	Buenos Aires, Argentina	6th	Long jump	5.63 m 0.0 m/s)
2006	South American U23 Championships / South American Games	Buenos Aires, Argentina	5th	Triple jump	12.38 m (+1.4 m/s)
2008	Ibero-American Championships	Iquique, Chile	3rd	Heptathlon	5278 pts
2009	South American Championships	Lima, Peru	2nd	Heptathlon	5360 pts
2011	South American Championships	Buenos Aires, Argentina	5th	Long jump	5.89 m
2011	South American Championships	Buenos Aires, Argentina	–	Heptathlon	DNF
2011	Universiade	Shenzhen, China	22nd (q)	Long jump	5.82 m
2011	Universiade	Shenzhen, China	–	Heptathlon	DNF
2012	Ibero-American Championships	Barquisimeto, Venezuela	2nd	Long jump	6.14 m
2013	South American Championships	Cartagena, Colombia	1st	Long jump	6.54 m
2013	World Championships	Moscow, Russia	29th (q)	Long jump	5.93 m
2014	South American Games	Santiago, Chile	4th	Long jump	5.97 m
2015	South American Championships	Lima, Peru	5th	Long jump	6.15 m
2015	Pan American Games	Toronto, Canada	13th	Long jump	5.99 m
2016	Ibero-American Championships	Rio de Janeiro, Brazil	5th	Long jump	5.96 m
2017	South American Championships	Asunción, Paraguay	2nd	Long jump	6.51 m (w)
2017	Bolivarian Games	Santa Marta, Colombia	2nd	Long jump	6.34 m
2018	South American Games	Cochabamba, Bolivia	5th	Long jump	6.53 m
2019	South American Championships	Lima, Peru	3rd	Long jump	6.36 m
2019	Pan American Games	Lima, Peru	13th	Long jump	6.14 m
2020	South American Indoor Championships	Cochabamba, Bolivia	4th	Long jump	6.27 m
2021	South American Championships	Guayaquil, Ecuador	6th	Long jump	6.28 m
