= Keisa Monterola =

Venezuelan pole vaulter (born 1988)

Personal information
- Born: 26 February 1988 (age 38) Caracas, Venezuela

Sport
- Sport: Track and field
Medal record
Representing Venezuela
Central American and Caribbean Games
| Gold medal – first place | 2010 Mayagüez | Pole vault |
| Bronze medal – third place | 2006 Cartagena | Pole vault |
South American Games
| Gold medal – first place | 2006 Buenos Aires | Pole vault |
World Youth Championships
| Silver medal – second place | 2005 Marrakesh | Pole vault |

Keisa Monterola (born 26 February 1988) is a Venezuelan athlete specializing in the pole vault. She won silver medal at the 2005 World Youth Championships in Marrakesh.

Monterola competed for the Eastern Washington Eagles track and field team in the NCAA.

Her personal best jump is 4.33 metres outdoors (2011) and 4.37 metres indoors (2012).

== Competition record ==
| Year | Competition | Venue | Position | Notes |
Representing Venezuela
| 2002 | South American Junior Championships / South American Games | Belém, Brazil | — | NH |
| 2003 | World Youth Championships | Sherbrooke, Canada | 19th | 3.35 m |
| 2004 | South American U23 Championships | Barquisimeto, Venezuela | 2nd (Note: Competing as guest) | 3.80 m |
| 2004 | World Junior Championships | Grosseto, Italy | 14th (q) | 3.85 m |
| 2004 | South American Youth Championships | Guayaquil, Ecuador | 1st | 3.80 m |
| 2005 | World Youth Championships | Marrakesh, Morocco | 2nd | 4.30 m |
| 2005 | Pan American Junior Championships | Windsor, Canada | 1st | 4.10 m |
| 2005 | South American Junior Championships | Rosario, Argentina | 1st | 3.60 m |
| 2006 | Ibero-American Championships | Ponce, Puerto Rico | – | NM |
| 2006 | Central American and Caribbean Games | Cartagena, Colombia | 3rd | 3.85 m |
| 2006 | South American U23 Championships / South American Games | Buenos Aires, Argentina | 1st | 4.10 m |
| 2007 | South American Junior Championships | São Paulo, Brazil | 1st | 4.15 m |
| 2007 | Pan American Junior Championships | São Paulo, Brazil | 3rd | 4.10 m |
| 2007 | Pan American Games | Rio de Janeiro, Brazil | – | NM |
| 2008 | Ibero-American Championships | Iquique, Chile | 3rd | 4.00 m |
| 2008 | Central American and Caribbean Championships | Cali, Colombia | 2nd | 4.00 m |
| 2010 | Ibero-American Championships | San Fernando, Spain | 7th | 3.90 m |
| 2010 | Central American and Caribbean Games | Mayagüez, Puerto Rico | 1st | 4.20 m |
| 2011 | Central American and Caribbean Championships | Mayagüez, Puerto Rico | 1st | 4.00 m |
| 2011 | Pan American Games | Guadalajara, Mexico | 5th | 4.30 m |
| 2012 | Ibero-American Championships | Barquisimeto, Venezuela | – | NM |
