= José Acevedo (sprinter) =

Venezuelan sprinter (born 1986)

Personal information
- Full name: José Eduardo Acevedo Herrera
- Nationality: Venezuela
- Born: 30 March 1986 (age 40) Caracas, Venezuela
- Height: 1.79 m (5 ft 10 in)
- Weight: 65 kg (143 lb)

Sport
- Sport: Athletics
- University team: Kentucky Wildcats
Medal record
Men's athletics
Representing Venezuela
Pan American Games
Bronze medal – third place	2011 Guadalajara	4x400 m relay
South American Youth Championships
Silver medal – second place	2002 Asunción	400 m
Bronze medal – third place	2002 Asunción	200 m
- Updated on 14 May 2013

José Eduardo Acevedo Herrera (born 30 March 1986) is a Venezuelan athlete.

== Career ==
He competed in the 200 meters race at the 2008 Olympic Games in Beijing. He finished fifth in his heat with a time of 21.06 seconds, failing to reach the second round.

== Personal bests ==
Outdoor

- 100 m: 10.45 s (wind: +0.0 m/s) – Tempe, United States, 21 March 2009
- 200 m: 20.58 s NR (wind: +1.9 m/s) – Fayetteville, United States, 30 May 2008
- 400 m: 46.07 s – Gainesville, United States, 17 May 2009

Indoor

- 60 m: 6.76 s NR – Lexington, United States, 7 February 2009
- 200 m: 20.99 s NR – Fayetteville, United States, 14 March 2008
- 400 m: 47.08 s NR – Fayetteville, United States, 2 March 2008

== Achievements ==
Year	Competition	Venue	Position	Event	Notes
Representing Venezuela
2001	World Youth Championships	Debrecen, Hungary	5th (h)	200 m	22.13 s (wind: -0.9 m/s)
2001	World Youth Championships	Debrecen, Hungary	4th (sf)	400 m	48.76 s
2001	World Youth Championships	Debrecen, Hungary	8th	Medley Relay 1000m (100m x 200m x 300m x 400m)	1:55.38 min
2001	South American Junior Championships	Santa Fe, Argentina	7th	200 m	22.31 s (wind: -0.7 m/s)
2001	South American Junior Championships	Santa Fe, Argentina	2nd	4 × 400 m relay	3:09.91 min
2001	Pan American Junior Championships	Santa Fe, Argentina	2nd	4 × 400 m relay	3:14.06 min
2002	South American Junior Championships / South American Games	Belém, Brazil	–	4 × 100 m relay	DQ
2002	South American Junior Championships / South American Games	Belém, Brazil	2nd	4 × 400 m relay	3:11.20 min
2002	South American Youth Championships	Asunción, Paraguay	3rd	200 m	21.66 s w (wind: +3.4 m/s)
2002	South American Youth Championships	Asunción, Paraguay	2nd	400 m	48.22 s
2003	World Youth Championships	Sherbrooke, Canada	–	400 m	DQ
2003	Pan American Junior Championships	Bridgetown, Barbados	3rd (h)	400 m	48.31 s
2004	South American Under-23 Championships	Barquisimeto, Venezuela	2nd (h)	200 m	20.96 s w (wind: -0.6 m/s)
2004	World Junior Championships	Grosseto, Italy	23rd (sf)	200 m	21.66 s (wind: +0.3 m/s)
2004	World Junior Championships	Grosseto, Italy	39th (h)	400 m	48.95 s
2005	ALBA Games	Havana, Cuba	3rd	200 m	21.27 s (wind: +0.0 m/s)
2005	ALBA Games	Havana, Cuba	2nd	4 × 400 m relay	3:10.21 min
2005	South American Championships	Cali, Colombia	5th	200 m	20.93 s w (wind: +4.9 m/s)
2005	South American Championships	Cali, Colombia	4th	4 × 400 m relay	3:09.02 min
2006	Central American and Caribbean Games	Cartagena, Colombia	11th (sf)	200 m	21.12 s (wind: -0.1 m/s)
2006	Central American and Caribbean Games	Cartagena, Colombia	5th	4 × 400 m relay	3:05.82 min
2008	Central American and Caribbean Championships	Cali, Colombia	3rd	200 m	20.79 s A
2008	Central American and Caribbean Championships	Cali, Colombia	4th	4 × 400 m relay	3:06.10 min A
2008	Olympic Games	Beijing, China	5th (h)	200 m	21.06 s
2011	Central American and Caribbean Championships	Mayagüez, Puerto Rico	4th (h)	200 m	21.03 s (wind: +1.5 m/s)
2011	Central American and Caribbean Championships	Mayagüez, Puerto Rico	6th	4 × 400 m relay	3:04.93 min
2011	ALBA Games	Barquisimeto, Venezuela	5th	400 m	46.76 s
2011	ALBA Games	Barquisimeto, Venezuela	1st	4 × 400 m relay	3:04.83 min
2011	Pan American Games	Guadalajara, Mexico	17th (sf)	200 m	20.85 s (wind: +0.1 m/s)
2011	Pan American Games	Guadalajara, Mexico	3rd	4 × 400 m relay	3:00.82 min
2012	World Indoor Championships	Istanbul, Turkey	3rd (h)	4 × 400 m relay	3:11.11 min
2012	Ibero-American Championships	Barquisimeto, Venezuela	4th	200 m	20.76 s (wind: -0.9 m/s)
2012	Ibero-American Championships	Barquisimeto, Venezuela	2nd	4 × 100 m relay	39.01 s NR
