= Germán Lauro =

Argentine shot putter and discus thrower (born 1984)

Personal information
- Full name: Germán Luján Lauro
- Born: 2 April 1984 (age 42) Trenque Lauquen, Argentina
- Height: 1.86 m (6 ft 1 in)
- Weight: 127 kg (280 lb)

Sport
- Country: Argentina
- Sport: Track and field
- Events: Discus, Shot put
Medal record
Men's athletics
Representing Argentina
Pan American Games
Bronze medal – third place	2011 Guadalajara	Shot put
Bronze medal – third place	2015 Toronto	Shot put
South American Championships
Gold medal – first place	2006 Tunja	Shot put
Gold medal – first place	2007 São Paulo	Shot put
Gold medal – first place	2007 São Paulo	Discus throw
Gold medal – first place	2009 Lima	Shot put
Gold medal – first place	2009 Lima	Discus throw
Gold medal – first place	2011 Buenos Aires	Shot put
Gold medal – first place	2013 Cartagenas	Shot put
Gold medal – first place	2013 Cartagenas	Discus throw
Gold medal – first place	2015 Lima	Shot put
Silver medal – second place	2011 Buenos Aires	Discus throw
Silver medal – second place	2017 Asunción	Discus throw
Bronze medal – third place	2017 Asunción	Shot put
Ibero-American Championships
Gold medal – first place	2012 Barquisimeto	Shot put
Gold medal – first place	2012 Barquisimeto	Discus throw
Gold medal – first place	2014 São Paulo	Shot put
Gold medal – first place	2014 São Paulo	Discus throw
Silver medal – second place	2010 San Fernando	Shot put
Bronze medal – third place	2008 Iquique	Shot put
- Updated on 22 May 2013

Germán Luján Lauro (born 2 April 1984) is an Argentine shot putter and discus thrower. He is the South American record holder in the shot put both indoors and outdoors with marks of 21.04 m and 21.26 m, respectively. His personal best in the discus is 63.55 metres.

Lauro placed sixth in the shot put at the 2012 IAAF World Indoor Championships and the 2012 Olympic Games. He represented his country at the World Championships in Athletics in 2007, 2009 and 2011, although he did not reach the finals. He also competed at the 2008 Beijing Olympics and is a two-time participant at the Pan American Games.

He gradually emerged at the regional level, winning South American youth, junior and under-23 titles. He reached the top of his field at continental level in 2006 with a gold medal in the shot put at the South American Championships in Athletics. He extended his shot put reign with four wins from 2006 to 2011 and won two discus gold medals (2007 and 2009) before taking silver in 2011. He began to make an impact at a greater regional level from 2010 onwards, taking a shot put bronze at the 2011 Pan American Games and two gold medals at the 2012 Ibero-American Championships in Athletics. In 2010 he won the Konex Award as one of the five best Athletes of the last decade in Argentina.

== Career ==
=== Early career ===
Germán Lauro was born on 2 April 1984 in Trenque Lauquen in Argentina's Buenos Aires Province. He is a member of the local sports club, Foot Ball Club Argentino. He began training with Carlos Llera, a physical education teacher, while at high school in his home town.

In his first continental competition he won both the shot put and discus throw events at the 2000 South American Youth Championships in Athletics. He also placed seventh in the discus in the Junior Championships that year. His first junior medal came the following year at the 2001 Pan American Junior Athletics Championships, where he was the discus silver medallist behind Héctor Hurtado. He was seventh in the shot put at the 2001 South American Junior Championships in Athletics and a finalist at the 2001 World Youth Championships in Athletics.

He competed for Argentina in the discus at the 2002 World Junior Championships in Athletics, but didn't make the final round, although he was the shot put and discus runner-up at the South American Juniors (second to Brazil's Gustavo de Mendonça both times). In his final junior year he placed fifth in the discus and twelfth in the shot put at the 2003 Pan American Junior Athletics Championships. He managed only fourth in the shot and third in the discus at the 2003 South American Junior Championships in Athletics.

=== First senior medals ===
He achieved little progress in his first senior year, with his sole medal (a bronze) coming in the discus at the 2004 South American Under-23 Championships in Athletics. He improved his shot put best to 18.17 metres the next year and placed fourth in the event at the 2005 South American Championships in Athletics.

The 2006 season saw Lauro establish himself in the shot put at the senior level as he began to make effective use of the spin technique. After a fourth-place finish at the 2006 Ibero-American Championships in Athletics he broke the Argentine record for the event with a throw of 19.46 m. At the 2006 South American Championships in Athletics he had a no throw in the discus but excelled in the shot put, taking the gold medal with a mark of 18.97 m. A South American under-23 record of 19.78 m came at that year's South American U23 Championships, where he won both the shot put and discus titles. He also extended his personal best in the discus to 60.30 m, clearing sixty metres for the first time.

He expanded his regional dominance to the discus at the 2007 South American Championships in Athletics, winning both the shot put and discus gold medals. He was a finalist in both events at the 2007 Pan American Games, coming fifth in the shot put and fourth in the discus. His global senior debut followed at the 2007 World Championships in Athletics, although he was eliminated in the first round. A throw of 61.78 m in Buenos Aires marked a season-ending personal best in the discus. He began 2008 in strong form, throwing a national record of 19.88 m for the shot put in February. A bronze medal in the event followed at the 2008 Ibero-American Championships in Athletics, where he was also fourth in the discus. On his Olympic debut at the 2008 Beijing Games he was knocked out in the qualifying rounds.

=== Further regional titles ===
Lauro defended his shot put and discus titles at the 2009 South American Championships in Athletics, having his season's best marks of 19.20 m and 60.41 m there. He gained selection for both events at the 2009 World Championships in Athletics, but did not make the final in either event. With few major international events in 2010, his focus that year was the Ibero-American Championships. He was fourth in the discus but reached new distances in the shot put event, taking the silver medal with a significant improvement to 20.43 m. He was only beaten by Marco Fortes in the last series of throws.

The 2011 South American Championships in Athletics was hosted in his home capital Buenos Aires and he defended his shot put title on the first day of competition. Lauro was dethroned in the discus, however, as he finished runner-up to Brazil's Ronald Julião. He represented Argentina in the first round of the shot put at the 2011 World Championships in Athletics, but the peak of his season came at the 2011 Pan American Games, where he won the bronze medal with a throw of 20.41 m.

=== South American records ===
Lauro took the indoor circuit for the first time at the start of 2012. He had national indoor records of 19.86 m, then 19.89 m. A South American indoor record of 20.40 m followed in the first round of the 2012 IAAF World Indoor Championships and he finished sixth in the final round – the best global placing of his career at that point. In the outdoor season he threw a national record of 20.43 m in Mar de Plata and claimed a shot put/discus double at the 2010 Ibero-American Championships in Athletics, which included a discus best of 63.55 m. This qualified him for the events at the 2012 London Olympics and in the Olympic shot put he threw 20.75 m in qualifying before hurling a personal best of 20.84 m in the final to finish in sixth place. He performed less well in the discus, finishing 37th in qualifying.

He improved his shot put best further at the start of the next season with marks of 20.89 m and 20.98 m in Argentina. At the Doha leg of the 2013 Diamond League he threw a South American record of 21.26 metres, taking second place in the shot put.

== Personal bests ==
- Shot put: 21.26 m – (Qatar) Doha, 10 May 2013
- Discus throw: 63.55 m – (Venezuela) Barquisimeto, 8 June 2012

== Achievements ==
Year	Competition	Venue	Position	Event	Notes
Representing Argentina
2000	South American Youth Championships	Bogotá, Colombia	1st	Shot put (5 kg)	17.77 m
2000	South American Youth Championships	Bogotá, Colombia	1st	Discus throw (1.5 kg)	53.99 m
2001	South American Junior Championships	Santa Fe, Argentina	1st	Discus throw (1.75 kg)	51.68 m
2001	Pan American Junior Championships	Santa Fe, Argentina	2nd	Discus throw (1.75 kg)	50.14 m
2002	World Junior Championships	Kingston, Jamaica	19th (q)	Discus (1.75 kg)	53.69 m
2002	South American Junior Championships / South American Games	Belém, Brazil	2nd	Shot put (6 kg)	17.56 m
2002	South American Junior Championships / South American Games	Belém, Brazil	2nd	Discus throw (1.75 kg)	52.44 m
2003	South American Junior Championships	Guayaquil, Ecuador	3rd	Discus throw (1.75 kg)	56.08 m
2004	South American U23 Championships	Barquisimeto, Venezuela	4th	Shot put	16.49 m
2004	South American U23 Championships	Barquisimeto, Venezuela	3rd	Discus	50.56 m
2005	South American Championships	Cali, Colombia	4th	Shot put	17.96 m
2006	Ibero-American Championships	Ponce, Puerto Rico	4th	Shot put	18.47 m
2006	South American Championships	Tunja, Colombia	1st	Shot put	18.97 m
2006	South American Championships	Tunja, Colombia	–	Discus throw	NM
2006	South American U23 Championships / South American Games	Buenos Aires, Argentina	1st	Shot put	19.78 m
2006	South American U23 Championships / South American Games	Buenos Aires, Argentina	1st	Discus throw	57.51 m
2007	South American Championships	São Paulo, Brazil	1st	Shot put	19.65 m
2007	South American Championships	São Paulo, Brazil	1st	Discus throw	57.12 m
2007	Pan American Games	Rio de Janeiro, Brazil	5th	Shot put	19.49 m
2007	Pan American Games	Rio de Janeiro, Brazil	4th	Discus throw	56.08 m
2007	World Championships	Osaka, Japan	23rd (q)	Shot put	19.19 m
2008	Ibero-American Championships	Iquique, Chile	3rd	Shot put	19.02 m
2008	Ibero-American Championships	Iquique, Chile	4th	Discus throw	56.53 m
2008	Olympic Games	Beijing, China	32nd (q)	Shot put	19.07 m
2009	South American Championships	Lima, Peru	1st	Shot put	19.20 m
2009	South American Championships	Lima, Peru	1st	Discus throw	60.41 m
2009	World Championships	Berlin, Germany	—	Shot put	NM
2010	Ibero-American Championships	San Fernando, Spain	2nd	Shot put	20.43 m
2010	Ibero-American Championships	San Fernando, Spain	4th	Discus throw	59.66 m
2011	South American Championships	Buenos Aires, Argentina	1st	Shot put	19.61 m
2011	South American Championships	Buenos Aires, Argentina	2nd	Discus throw	59.98 m
2011	World Championships	Daegu, South Korea	20th (q)	Shot put	19.50 m
2011	Pan American Games	Guadalajara, Mexico	3rd	Shot put	20.41 m
2012	World Indoor Championships	Istanbul, Turkey	6th	Shot put	20.38 m
2012	Ibero-American Championships	Barquisimeto, Venezuela	1st	Shot put	20.13 m
2012	Ibero-American Championships	Barquisimeto, Venezuela	1st	Discus throw	63.55 m
2012	Olympic Games	London, United Kingdom	6th	Shot put	20.84 m (NR)
2012	Olympic Games	London, United Kingdom	37th (q)	Discus throw	57.54 m
2013	South American Championships	Cartagena, Colombia	1st	Shot put	20.87 m
2013	South American Championships	Cartagena, Colombia	1st	Discus throw	60.45 m
2013	World Championships	Moscow, Russia	7th	Shot put	20.40 m
2014	World Indoor Championships	Sopot, Poland	6th	Shot put	20.50 m
2014	South American Games	Santiago, Chile	1st	Shot put	20.70 m
2014	South American Games	Santiago, Chile	3rd	Discus throw	58.36 m
2014	Ibero-American Championships	São Paulo, Brazil	1st	Shot put	20.14 m
2014	Ibero-American Championships	São Paulo, Brazil	1st	Discus throw	61.62 m
2015	South American Championships	Lima, Peru	1st	Shot put	20.77 m
2015	Pan American Games	Toronto, Canada	3rd	Shot put	20.24 m
2015	World Championships	Beijing, China	9th	Shot put	19.70 m
2016	World Indoor Championships	Portland, United States	6th	Shot put	20.24 m
2016	Ibero-American Championships	Rio de Janeiro, Brazil	4th	Shot put	18.95 m
2016	Olympic Games	Rio de Janeiro, Brazil	19th (q)	Shot put	19.89 m
2017	South American Championships	Asunción, Paraguay	3rd	Shot put	19.91 m
2017	South American Championships	Asunción, Paraguay	2nd	Discus throw	61.70 m
2019	South American Championships	Lima, Peru	3rd	Shot put	18.97 m
