= Kael Becerra =

Chilean sprinter (born 1985)

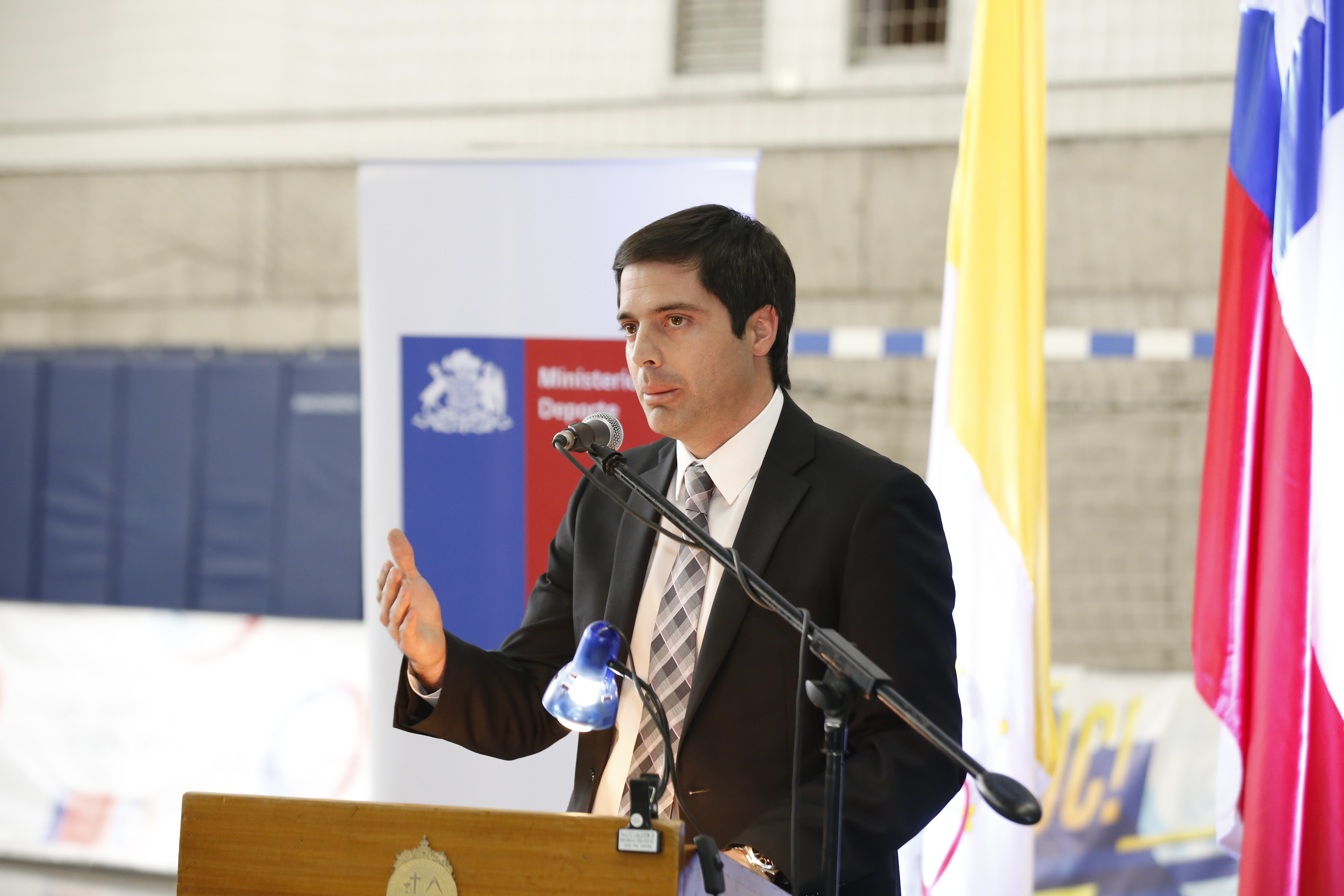
- Kael Becerra in 2018.

Personal information
- Full name: Kael Alejandro Becerra Rojas
- Born: November 4, 1985 (age 40) Santiago, Chile
- Height: 1.82 m (6 ft 0 in)
- Weight: 81 kg (179 lb)

Sport
- Country: Chile
- Sport: Athletics
- Updated on 5 June 2013

Kael Alejandro Becerra Rojas (born 4 November 1985 in Santiago) is a Chilean athlete specializing in the sprinting events.

== Personal bests ==
Outdoor

- 100 metres – 10.26 s (+1.4 m/s) (Bogotá, Colombia 2011)
- 200 metres – 20.77 s (+1.2 m/s) (Bogotá, Colombia 2006)

Indoor

- 60 metres – 6.61 s (Valencia, Spain 2007)

== Competition record ==
Year	Competition	Venue	Position	Event	Notes
Representing Chile
2001	World Youth Championships	Debrecen, Hungary	27th (h)	100 m	10.93 s (wind: +1.7 m/s)
2001	World Youth Championships	Debrecen, Hungary	34th (h)	200 m	22.34 s (wind: +0.6 m/s)
2002	World Junior Championships	Kingston, Jamaica	—	4 × 100 m relay	DQ
2002	South American Junior Championships / South American Games	Belém, Brazil	3rd	200m	21.46 (wind: +1.1 m/s)
2002	South American Junior Championships / South American Games	Belém, Brazil	4th	200m	21.46 (wind: +1.1 m/s)
2002	South American Junior Championships / South American Games	Belém, Brazil	2nd	4 × 100 m relay	41.22
2002	South American Junior Championships / South American Games	Belém, Brazil	4th	4 × 400 m relay	3:18.28
2003	Pan American Junior Championships	Bridgetown, Barbados	5th (h)	100 m	11.04 s (wind: -2.5 m/s)
2003	Pan American Junior Championships	Bridgetown, Barbados	7th (h)	200 m	21.74 s (wind: +0.1 m/s)
2004	World Junior Championships	Grosseto, Italy	27th (h)	100 m	10.73 s (wind: -1.6 m/s)
2004	South American U23 Championships	Barquisimeto, Venezuela	5th	100m	10.62 (wind: +0.0 m/s)
2004	South American U23 Championships	Barquisimeto, Venezuela	—	200m	DNF
2004	South American U23 Championships	Barquisimeto, Venezuela	3rd	4 × 100 m relay	41.07
2005	South American Championships	Cali, Colombia	6th	100 m	10.62 s (wind: +0.2 m/s)
2005	South American Championships	Cali, Colombia	11th (h)	200 m	21.71 s (wind: +0.3 m/s)
2006	World Indoor Championships	Moscow, Russia	13th (sf)	60 m	6.70 s (=iNR)
2006	Ibero-American Championships	Ponce, Puerto Rico	2nd	100 m	10.32 s (wind: +0.3 m/s)
2006	Ibero-American Championships	Ponce, Puerto Rico	4th	200 m	21.05 s (wind: +1.8 m/s)
2006	South American Championships	Tunja, Colombia	2nd	100 m	10.50 s (wind: -2.0 m/s)
2006	South American U23 Championships / South American Games	Buenos Aires, Argentina	1st	100m	10.33 (wind: +0.9 m/s)
2006	South American U23 Championships / South American Games	Buenos Aires, Argentina	4th	200m	20.93 w (wind: +2.3 m/s)
2006	South American U23 Championships / South American Games	Buenos Aires, Argentina	6th	4 × 100 m relay	41.87
2006	South American U23 Championships / South American Games	Buenos Aires, Argentina	2nd	4 × 400 m relay	3:10.08
2007	ALBA Games	Caracas, Venezuela	3rd	100 m	10.35 s w (wind: +2.3 m/s)
2007	ALBA Games	Caracas, Venezuela	1st (h)	200 m	21.13 s w (wind: +2.7 m/s)
2007	Pan American Games	Rio de Janeiro, Brazil	12th (sf)	100 m	10.43 s (wind: -0.5 m/s)
2007	Universiade	Bangkok, Thailand	13th (sf)	100 m	10.81 s (wind: -3.8 m/s)
2008	World Indoor Championships	Valencia, Spain	23rd (sf)	60 m	6.80 s
2008	Ibero-American Championships	Iquique, Chile	3rd	100 m	10.62 s (wind: -2.3 m/s)
2008	Ibero-American Championships	Iquique, Chile	10th (h)	200 m	21.73 s (wind: -1.7 m/s)
2009	South American Championships	Lima, Peru	4th	100 m	10.50 s (wind: +0.6 m/s)
2009	South American Championships	Lima, Peru	3rd	200 m	21.32 s (wind: +0.0 m/s)
2009	Universiade	Belgrade, Serbia	4th	100 m	10.38 s (wind: -0.7 m/s)
2010	Ibero-American Championships	San Fernando, Spain	13th (h)	100 m	10.64 s (wind: +0.1 m/s)
2011	South American Championships	Buenos Aires, Argentina	2nd	100 m	10.41 s (wind: +0.0 m/s)
2011	South American Championships	Buenos Aires, Argentina	4th	200 m	21.20 s (wind: +1.7 m/s)
2011	South American Championships	Buenos Aires, Argentina	3rd	4 × 100 m relay	40.83 s
2011	Universiade	Shenzhen, China	33rd (h)	100 m	10.68 s (wind: -0.4 m/s)
2011	Universiade	Shenzhen, China	28th (qf)	200 m	21.65 s (wind: +0.0 m/s)
2011	Pan American Games	Guadalajara, Mexico	19th (h)	100 m	10.49 s (wind: -1.0 m/s)
2011	Pan American Games	Guadalajara, Mexico	21st (sf)	200 m	21.23 s (wind: +0.1 m/s)
2011	Pan American Games	Guadalajara, Mexico	4th (h)	4 × 100 m relay	39.68 s (NR)
