= Marielys Rojas =

Venezuelan high jumper (born 1986)

Personal information
- Full name: Marielys Karina Rojas
- Nationality: Venezuela
- Born: April 30, 1986 (age 40) Carabobo, Venezuela

Sport
- Country: Venezuela
- Sport: Athletics
- Updated on 12 June 2013

Marielys Rojas (or Marierlis Rojas, born April 30, 1986) is a Venezuelan athlete specializing in the high jump. Her personal best in the event is 1.90 meters achieved in 2008 in Ponce. This is the current national record.

== Doping ==
On 27 October 2011, she was tested positive for the abuse of Norandrosterone. As a consequence, she was stripped of her silver medal obtained in the high jump, event at the Pan American Games and declared to be ineligible to compete for two years until 21 November 2013. Another source reports here disqualification as early as 16 July 2011 due to IAAF Rule 32.2.a.

== Personal bests ==
- High jump: 1.90 m – (Puerto Rico) Ponce, 29 March 2008
- Triple jump: 12.59 m (wind: +1.6 m/s) – (Venezuela) Barquisimeto, 26 June 2004

== Competition record ==
Year	Competition	Venue	Position	Event	Notes
Representing Venezuela
2002	Central American and Caribbean Junior Championships (U17)	Bridgetown, Barbados	1st	High jump	1.71 m
2002	South American Junior Championships / South American Games	Belém, Brazil	2nd	High jump	1.71 m
2002	South American Youth Championships	Asunción, Paraguay	3rd	High jump	1.66 m
2002	South American Youth Championships	Asunción, Paraguay	3rd	Triple jump	11.90 m w
2003	South American Junior Championships	Guayaquil, Ecuador	3rd	High jump	1.77 m
2004	South American Under-23 Championships	Barquisimeto, Venezuela	5th	Triple jump	12.59 m (wind: +1.6 m/s)
2005	South American Championships	Cali, Colombia	3rd	High jump	1.79 m
2005	Bolivarian Games	Armenia, Colombia	2nd	High jump	1.80 m
2005	South American Junior Championships	Rosario, Argentina	1st	High jump	1.76 m
2006	Ibero-American Championships	Ponce, Puerto Rico	3rd	High jump	1.84 m
2006	Central American and Caribbean Games	Cartagena, Colombia	5th	High jump	1.82 m
2006	South American U23 Championships / South American Games	Buenos Aires, Argentina	1st	High jump	1.87 m (NR)
2007	ALBA Games	Caracas, Venezuela	2nd	High jump	1.82 m
2007	South American Championships	São Paulo, Brazil	3rd	High jump	1.78 m
2008	Ibero-American Championships	Iquique, Chile	5th	High jump	1.75 m
2008	Central American and Caribbean Championships	Cali, Colombia	3rd	High jump	1.79 m
2011	South American Championships	Buenos Aires, Argentina	1st	High jump	1.80 m
2011	Central American and Caribbean Championships	Mayagüez, Puerto Rico	2nd	High jump	1.82 m^{‡}
2011	World Championships	Daegu, South Korea	25th (q)	High jump	1.85 m^{‡}
2011	Pan American Games	Guadalajara, Mexico	–	High jump	DQ^{†}

^{†}: Disqualified because of doping.
^{‡}: Might be disqualified because of doping (to be verified).
