= Alex Pereira (disambiguation) =

Alex Pereira (born 1987) is a Brazilian kickboxer.

Alex Pereira may also refer to:

- Álex Pereira (born 1977), Venezuelan retired footballer
- Alex Pereira (footballer) (born 1982), Brazilian retired footballer
- Alex Pereira Lopes (born 1989), Brazilian footballer
- Alex Pereira Soares (born 1982), Brazilian footballer known as "Alex"
- Alessandro Pereira (Alex Alves Pereira), cousin of Brazilian shooting victim Jean Charles de Menezes
