= María Fernanda Mackenna =

Chilean sprinter

Personal information
- Full name: María Fernanda Mackenna Cooper
- Born: December 2, 1986 (age 39) Santiago, Chile
- Height: 1.71 m (5 ft 7 in)
- Weight: 58 kg (128 lb)

Sport
- Sport: Athletics
- Event: Sprinting
- Coached by: Eduardo Fuentes

María Fernanda Mackenna Cooper (born 2 December 1986, in Santiago) is a Chilean sprinter who competes in the 200 and 400 metres. She has won multiple medals at regional revel.

== International competitions ==
Year	Competition	Venue	Position	Event	Notes
Representing Chile
2001	South American Junior Championships	Santa Fe, Argentina	8th	100 m	12.91
2001	South American Junior Championships	Santa Fe, Argentina	10th (h)	200 m	25.99
2001	South American Junior Championships	Santa Fe, Argentina	4th	4 × 100 m relay	47.49
2001	South American Junior Championships	Santa Fe, Argentina	4th	4 × 400 m relay	3:51.05
2002	South American Games	Belém, Brazil	5th	100 m	12.33
2002	South American Games	Belém, Brazil	6th	200 m	25.21
2002	South American Games	Belém, Brazil	3rd	4 × 100 m relay	47.11
2002	South American Games	Belém, Brazil	4th	4 × 400 m relay	3:49.09
2002	South American Junior Championships	Belém, Brazil	5th	100 m	12.33
2002	South American Junior Championships	Belém, Brazil	6th	200 m	25.21
2002	South American Junior Championships	Belém, Brazil	3rd	4 × 100 m relay	47.11
2002	South American Junior Championships	Belém, Brazil	4th	4 × 400 m relay	3:49.09
2002	South American Youth Championships	Asunción, Paraguay	4th	100 m	12.63
2002	South American Youth Championships	Asunción, Paraguay	3rd	200 m	25.02 (w)
2002	South American Youth Championships	Asunción, Paraguay	5th	4 × 100 m relay	51.3
2002	South American Youth Championships	Asunción, Paraguay	3rd	4 × 400 m relay	2:15.83
2003	South American Junior Championships	Guayaquil, Ecuador	1st	4 × 100 m relay	46.54
2003	South American Junior Championships	Guayaquil, Ecuador	4th	4 × 400 m relay	3:52.37
2003	Pan American Junior Championships	Bridgetown, Barbados	6th	4 × 100 m relay	46.38
2004	South American U23 Championships	Barquisimeto, Venezuela	2nd	200 m	24.47
2004	South American U23 Championships	Barquisimeto, Venezuela	2nd	4 × 100 m relay	45.67
2004	South American U23 Championships	Barquisimeto, Venezuela	2nd	4 × 400 m relay	3:48.38
2004	Ibero-American Championships	Huelva, Spain	9th (h)	200 m	25.28
2004	Ibero-American Championships	Huelva, Spain	–	4 × 100 m relay	DQ
2005	South American Championships	Cali, Colombia	6th	400 m	55.52
2005	South American Championships	Cali, Colombia	3rd	4 × 100 m relay	44.77
2005	South American Championships	Cali, Colombia	3rd	4 × 400 m relay	3:40.49
2005	Pan American Junior Championships	Windsor, Canada	7th	400 m	55.13
2005	South American Junior Championships	Rosario, Argentina	4th	200 m	24.53 (w)
2005	South American Junior Championships	Rosario, Argentina	3rd	400 m	55.23
2005	South American Junior Championships	Rosario, Argentina	5th	4 × 100 m relay	47.97
2005	South American Junior Championships	Rosario, Argentina	4th	4 × 400 m relay	3:47.66
2006	South American Games / South American U23 Championships	Buenos Aires, Argentina	2nd	4 × 100 m relay	46.63
2006	South American Games / South American U23 Championships	Buenos Aires, Argentina	4th	4 × 400 m relay	3:46.22
2007	South American Championships	São Paulo, Brazil	6th	200 m	24.47
2007	South American Championships	São Paulo, Brazil	5th	400 m	55.43
2007	South American Championships	São Paulo, Brazil	3rd	4 × 100 m relay	45.34
2007	South American Championships	São Paulo, Brazil	3rd	4 × 400 m relay	3:55.13
2007	Pan American Games	Toronto, Canada	21st (h)	200 m	24.97
2007	Pan American Games	Toronto, Canada	10th (h)	4 × 100 m relay	45.50
2011	South American Championships	Buenos Aires, Argentina	6th	200 m	24.56
2011	South American Championships	Buenos Aires, Argentina	6th	400 m	55.80
2011	South American Championships	Buenos Aires, Argentina	3rd	4 × 100 m relay	46.42
2011	South American Championships	Buenos Aires, Argentina	3rd	4 × 400 m relay	3:49.51
2012	Ibero-American Championships	Barquisimeto, Venezuela	9th (h)	200 m	23.91
2013	South American Championships	Cartagena, Colombia	7th	200 m	23.91
2013	South American Championships	Cartagena, Colombia	4th	4 × 100 m relay	45.53
2013	Bolivarian Games	Trujillo, Peru	4th	400 m	54.99
2013	Bolivarian Games	Trujillo, Peru	4th	4 × 100 m relay	45.31
2013	Bolivarian Games	Trujillo, Peru	3rd	4 × 400 m relay	3:41.74
2014	South American Games	Santiago, Chile	4th	200 m	24.01
2014	South American Games	Santiago, Chile	4th	400 m	53.49
2014	South American Games	Santiago, Chile	2nd	4 × 100 m relay	45.09
2014	South American Games	Santiago, Chile	3rd	4 × 400 m relay	3:37.42
2014	Ibero-American Championships	São Paulo, Brazil	4th	400 m	54.47
2015	South American Championships	Lima, Peru	4th	400 m	54.96
2015	South American Championships	Lima, Peru	3rd	4 × 100 m relay	44.83
2015	South American Championships	Lima, Peru	3rd	4 × 400 m relay	3:40.56
2015	Pan American Games	Toronto, Canada	10th (h)	4 × 100 m relay	45.38
2015	Pan American Games	Toronto, Canada	12th (h)	4 × 400 m relay	3:41.35
2016	Ibero-American Championships	Rio de Janeiro, Brazil	7th	400 m	54.60
2016	Ibero-American Championships	Rio de Janeiro, Brazil	3rd	4 × 400 m relay	3:36.16
2017	South American Championships	Asunción, Paraguay	11th (h)	200 m	24.48
2017	South American Championships	Asunción, Paraguay	10th (h)	400 m	56.67
2017	South American Championships	Asunción, Paraguay	3rd	4 × 400 m relay	3:40.00
2017	Bolivarian Games	Santa Marta, Colombia	3rd	400 m	54.05
2017	Bolivarian Games	Santa Marta, Colombia	1st	4 × 400 m relay	3:37.93
2018	South American Games	Cochabamba, Bolivia	3rd	400 m	53.60
2018	South American Games	Cochabamba, Bolivia	2nd	4 × 400 m relay	3:33.42
2018	Ibero-American Championships	Trujillo, Peru	4th	200 m	24.54
2018	Ibero-American Championships	Trujillo, Peru	6th	400 m	54.52
2018	Ibero-American Championships	Trujillo, Peru	5th	4 × 400 m relay	3:43.56
2019	World Relays	Yokohama, Japan	6th (B)	4 × 400 m relay	3:33.54
2019	South American Championships	Lima, Peru	6th	400 m	54.27
2019	South American Championships	Lima, Peru	4th	4 × 400 m relay	3:37.35
2019	Pan American Games	Lima, Peru	7th	4 × 400 m relay	3:39.95
2020	South American Indoor Championships	Cochabamba, Bolivia	2nd	200 m	24.24
2020	South American Indoor Championships	Cochabamba, Bolivia	2nd	400 m	54.45
2021	World Relays	Chorzów, Poland	14th (h)	4 × 400 m relay	3:41.28
2021	South American Championships	Guayaquil, Ecuador	6th	400 m	55.45
2021	South American Championships	Guayaquil, Ecuador	2nd	4 × 400 m relay	3:34.89
2023	Pan American Games	Santiago, Chile	6th	4 × 400 m relay	3:37.00

== Personal bests ==
Outdoor

- 100 metres – 11.85 (+1.5 m/s, Santiago 2012)
- 200 metres – 23.67 (+0.9 m/s, Santiago 2012)
- 400 metres – 53.13 (Santiago 2018)

Indoor

- 200 metres – 24.53 (Albuquerque 2016)
- 400 metres – 54.45 (Cochabamba, 2020)
