= Wilmary Álvarez =

Venezuelan sprinter

Personal information
- Born: 13 May 1984 (age 42)

Sport
- Sport: Track and field
- Event(s): 100 metres 200 metres 400 metres
Medal record
Representing Venezuela
South American Games
Gold medal – first place	2014 Santiago	4 × 100 m relay
South American Championships
Bronze medal – third place	2001 Manaus	4 × 100 m relay
Bronze medal – third place	2001 Manaus	4 × 400 m relay
Bronze medal – third place	2003 Barquisimeto	100 m
Bronze medal – third place	2003 Barquisimeto	200 m
Silver medal – second place	2003 Barquisimeto	4 × 400 m relay
Bronze medal – third place	2005 Cali	200 m
Bronze medal – third place	2005 Cali	400 m

Wilmary Álvarez (born 13 May 1984) is a Venezuelan track and field sprinter who competes in the 100 metres, 200 metres and 400 metres. She is a seven-time medallist at the South American Championships in Athletics, having won a medal in all of the individual sprint and relay events. She took a gold medal in the 4 × 100 metres relay at the 2014 South American Games.

With the Venezuelan women's relay team she has performed at 2011 Military World Games, the IAAF World Relays twice (2014, 2015) and also the 2015 Pan American Games. She helped set Venezuelan records in the 4 × 100 metres relay (44.81 seconds in 2012) and the 4 × 400 metres relay (3:34.30 minutes in 2003).

At regional level she has won several medals at the Bolivarian Games, Ibero-American Championships in Athletics and ALBA Games. She was also highly successful in age category competitions, taking medals at South American youth, junior and under-23 levels.

== Personal bests ==
- 100 metres – 11.59 (2003)
- 200 metres – 23.39 (2003)
- 400 metres – 53.33 (2008)

== International competitions ==
Year	Competition	Venue	Position	Event	Notes
1998	South American Youth Championships	Manaus, Brazil	2nd	100 m	12.43
1998	South American Youth Championships	Manaus, Brazil	4th	200 m	25.18
2000	World Junior Championships	Santiago, Chile	8th (semis)	200 m	24.54
2000	World Junior Championships	Santiago, Chile	5th (heats)	4 × 100 m relay	46.14
2000	South American Junior Championships	São Leopoldo, Brazil	3rd	100 m	12.13
2000	South American Junior Championships	São Leopoldo, Brazil	3rd	200 m	24.66w
2000	South American Junior Championships	São Leopoldo, Brazil	1st	4 × 100 m relay	46.87
2000	South American Youth Championships	Bogotá, Colombia	2nd	100 m	11.74A
2000	South American Youth Championships	Bogotá, Colombia	2nd	200 m	24.18A
2000	South American Youth Championships	Bogotá, Colombia	2nd	1000 m relay	2:14.05A
2001	South American Championships	Manaus, Brazil	5th	100 m	11.97
2001	South American Championships	Manaus, Brazil	5th	200 m	24.65
2001	South American Championships	Manaus, Brazil	3rd	4 × 100 m relay	47.22
2001	South American Championships	Manaus, Brazil	3rd	4 × 400 m relay	3:44.74
2001	World Youth Championships	Debrecen, Hungary	4th (semis)	100 m	12.13
2001	World Youth Championships	Debrecen, Hungary	3rd (semis)	200 m	24.68
2001	Bolivarian Games	Ambato, Ecuador	3rd	200 m	24.04A
2002	South American Junior Championships/ South American Games	Belém, Brazil	2nd	100 m	11.76
2002	South American Junior Championships/ South American Games	Belém, Brazil	1st	200 m	23.85
2002	South American Junior Championships/ South American Games	Belém, Brazil	2nd	4 × 100 m relay	45.58
2003	South American Junior Championships	Guayaquil, Ecuador	2nd	100 m	11.68
2003	South American Junior Championships	Guayaquil, Ecuador	1st	200 m	23.68
2003	South American Junior Championships	Guayaquil, Ecuador	2nd	4 × 100 m relay	46.92
2003	South American Junior Championships	Guayaquil, Ecuador	2nd	4 × 400 m relay	3:42.55
2003	CAC Championships	St. George's, Grenada	6th	200 m	23.45
2003	CAC Championships	St. George's, Grenada	5th	4 × 400 m relay	3:38.06
2003	South American Championships	Barquisimeto, Venezuela	3rd	100 m	11.59
2003	South American Championships	Barquisimeto, Venezuela	3rd	200 m	23.40
2003	South American Championships	Barquisimeto, Venezuela	5th	400 m	46.48
2003	South American Championships	Barquisimeto, Venezuela	2nd	4 × 400 m relay	3:34.30
2005	ALBA Games	Havana, Cuba	3rd	200 m	23.75
2005	ALBA Games	Havana, Cuba	3rd	400 m	53.9
2005	CAC Championships	Nassau, Bahamas	7th	200 m	23.25w
2005	South American Championships	Cali, Colombia	3rd	200 m	23.14
2005	South American Championships	Cali, Colombia	3rd	400 m	53.57
2005	South American Championships	Cali, Colombia	4th	4 × 100 m relay	46.24
2006	South American U23 Championships/ South American Games	Buenos Aires, Argentina	2nd	200 m	23.56
2006	South American U23 Championships/ South American Games	Buenos Aires, Argentina	2nd	400 m	54.03
2006	South American U23 Championships/ South American Games	Buenos Aires, Argentina	3rd	4 × 100 m relay	46.80
2006	South American U23 Championships/ South American Games	Buenos Aires, Argentina	1st	4 × 400 m relay	3:41.30
2008	Ibero-American Championships	Iquique, Chile	2nd	200 m	23.85
2008	Ibero-American Championships	Iquique, Chile	2nd	400 m	53.33
2008	Ibero-American Championships	Iquique, Chile	4th	4 × 400 m relay	3:40.30
2008	CAC Championships	Cali, Colombia	11th (heats)	200 m	23.87
2008	CAC Championships	Cali, Colombia	15th (heats)	400 m	54.12
2009	Bolivarian Games	Sucre, Bolivia	4th	200 m	23.95
2009	Bolivarian Games	Sucre, Bolivia	3rd	400 m	54.0
2009	Bolivarian Games	Sucre, Bolivia	2nd	4 × 400 m relay	3:40.57
2010	Ibero-American Championships	San Fernando, Spain	5th	400 m	53.88
2011	ALBA Games	Barquisimeto, Venezuela	3rd	100 m	12.04
2011	ALBA Games	Barquisimeto, Venezuela	2nd	4 × 100 m relay	45.79
2011	ALBA Games	Barquisimeto, Venezuela	2nd	4 × 400 m relay	3:53.11
2011	Military World Games	Rio de Janeiro, Brazil	7th	4 × 100 m relay	46.25
2011	Military World Games	Rio de Janeiro, Brazil	4th	4 × 400 m relay	3:46.30
2012	Ibero-American Championships	Barquisimeto, Venezuela	6th	100 m	11.89
2012	Ibero-American Championships	Barquisimeto, Venezuela	12th (heats)	200 m	24.09
2012	Ibero-American Championships	Barquisimeto, Venezuela	4th	4 × 100 m relay	44.81 NR
2013	Bolivarian Games	Trujillo, Peru	6th	200 m	24.24
2013	Bolivarian Games	Trujillo, Peru	2nd	4 × 100 m relay	44.16
2013	Bolivarian Games	Trujillo, Peru	2nd	4 × 400 m relay	3:40.49
2014	South American Games	Santiago, Chile	6th	200 m	24.30
2014	South American Games	Santiago, Chile	1st	4 × 100 m relay	45.08
2014	South American Games	Santiago, Chile	4th	4 × 400 m relay	3:44.20
2014	World Relays	Nassau, Bahamas	17th (heats)	4 × 100 m relay	44.64
2015	World Relays	Nassau, Bahamas	3rd (B final)	4 × 100 m relay	44.17
2015	World Relays	Nassau, Bahamas	15th (heats)	4 × 400 m relay	3:40.54
2015	Pan American Games	Toronto, Canada	5th	4 × 100 m relay	44.13
2015	Pan American Games	Toronto, Canada	11th (heats)	4 × 400 m relay	3:39.01
