= 2002 South American Junior Championships in Athletics =

XXXIV South American Junior Championships in Athletics
- Dates: August 1–3
- Host city: Belém, Brazil
- Venue: Estádio Olímpico do Pará
- Level: Junior
- Events: 44
- Participation: about 194 + guests athletes from 10 + 1 guest nation nations

The 34th South American Junior Championships in Athletics were held at the Estádio Olímpico do Pará in Belém, Brazil from August 1–3, 2002 in conjunction with the 7th South American (ODESUR) Games. Athletes from the Netherlands Antilles competed solely for the South American Games, and were considered as guests for the South American Junior Championships.

== Medal summary ==
Medal winners are published for men and women Complete results can be found on the "World Junior Athletics History" website.

=== Men ===
| Event | Gold | | Silver | | Bronze | |
|---|---|---|---|---|---|---|
| 100 metres (0.8 m/s) | Bruno Pacheco (BRA) | 10.50 | Eliezer de Almeida (BRA) | 10.60 | Pablo Colville (CHI) | 10.77 |
| 200 metres (1.1 m/s) | Bruno Pacheco (BRA) | 20.54 | Jorge Sena (BRA) | 21.18 | Kael Becerra (CHI) | 21.46 |
| 400 metres | Luís Ambrósio (BRA) | 46.51 | Luis Luna (VEN) | 46.82 | Andrés Silva (URU) | 47.50 |
| 800 metres | Cristián Matute (ECU) | 1:50.99 | Tai Payne (GUY) | 1:51.05 | Thiago Chyaromont (BRA) | 1:51.66 |
| 1500 metres | Clayton Aguiar (BRA) | 3:53.48 | Nico Herrera (VEN) | 3:55.67 | Alex Lopes (BRA) | 3:55.68 |
| 5000 metres | Fernando Fernandes (BRA) | 14:13.29 | Franck de Almeida (BRA) | 14:14.18 | Deivis Sánchez (VEN) | 14:53.51 |
| 10,000 metres | Franck de Almeida (BRA) | 29:39.25 | Deivis Sánchez (VEN) | 31:22.78 | Gilialdo Koball (BRA) | 31:38.64 |
| 3000 metres steeplechase | Fernando Fernandes (BRA) | 8:59.76 | Diego Moreno (PER) | 9:08.34 | Rodolfo Hass (BRA) | 9:20.70 |
| 110 metres hurdles (1.5 m/s) | Thiago Dias (BRA) | 13.94 | Leandro Peyrano (ARG) | 15.03 | Cristóbal Lyon (CHI) | 15.34 |
| 400 metres hurdles | Raphael Fernandes (BRA) | 52.85 | Daivison da Silva (BRA) | 53.31 | Pablo Schilling (CHI) | 53.52 |
| High jump | Fábio Baptista (BRA) | 2.07 | Luis Conde (VEN) | 2.04 | Francisco Tamariz (ECU) | 2.01 |
| Pole vault | Fábio da Silva (BRA) | 5.10 | José Francisco Nava (CHI) | 4.90 | Daniel Gabriel (BRA) | 4.60 |
| Long jump | Thiago Dias (BRA) | 7.92 (0.6 m/s) | Marcos Trivelato (BRA) | 7.30 (0.7 m/s) | Luis Tristán (PER) | 7.20 (0.5 m/s) |
| Triple jump | Leonardo dos Santos (BRA) | 15.97 (0.1 m/s) | Thiago Dias (BRA) | 15.55 (1.8 m/s) | Francisco Castro (CHI) | 14.48 (0.5 m/s) |
| Shot put | Gustavo de Mendonça (BRA) | 17.71* | Germán Lauro (ARG) | 17.56* | Juan Jaramillo (VEN) | 17.26* |
| Discus throw | Gustavo de Mendonça (BRA) | 52.78* | Germán Lauro (ARG) | 52.44* | Reginaldo Diógenes (BRA) | 49.33* |
| Hammer throw | Fabián Di Paolo (ARG) | 73.69* | Roberto Sáez (CHI) | 68.93* | Wagner Domingos (BRA) | 65.15* |
| Javelin throw | Júlio César de Oliveira (BRA) | 63.49 | Marcelo Junckes (BRA) | 61.42 | José Palma (VEN) | 59.00 |
| Decathlon | Fagner Martins (BRA) | 6626* | Randy Gutiérrez (VEN) | 6329* | Alcino dos Santos (BRA) | 6208* |
| 10,000 metres track walk | Rafael Duarte (BRA) | 43:11.39 | Andrés Chocho (ECU) | 44:36.81 | Carlos Borgoño (CHI) | 45:56.57 |
| 4 × 100 metres relay | Brazil; Bruno Pacheco; Eliezer de Almeida; Jorge Sena; Bruno Góes | 39.64 | Chile; Pablo Colville; Diego Valdés; Kael Becerra; Nicolás Sepúlveda | 41.22 | Argentina; Federico Satler; José Manuel Garaventa; Pablo Heredia; Sebastián Lasquera | 41.45 |
| 4 × 400 metres relay | Brazil; Diego Venâncio; Luís Ambrósio; Thiago Chyaromont; Luiz da Silva | 3:06.68 | Venezuela; Nico Herrera; Luis Luna; Arnold Amaya; José Acevedo | 3:11.20 | Argentina; Sebastián Lasquera; Leandro Peyrano; José Ignacio Pignataro; Matías López | 3:14.16 |

=== Women ===
| Event | Gold | | Silver | | Bronze | |
|---|---|---|---|---|---|---|
| 100 metres (1.3 m/s) | Thatiana Ignácio (BRA) | 11.57 | Wilmary Álvarez (VEN) | 11.76 | Evelyn dos Santos (BRA) | 11.90 |
| 200 metres (1.7 m/s) | Wilmary Álvarez (VEN) | 23.85 | Joyce Prieto (BRA) | 23.99 | Evelyn dos Santos (BRA) | 24.23 |
| 400 metres | Yusmelys García (VEN) | 54.38 | Joyce Prieto (BRA) | 54.50 | Ángela Alfonso (VEN) | 54.82 |
| 800 metres | Juliana de Azevedo (BRA) | 2:06.01 | Jenny Mejías (VEN) | 2:10.58 | Rejane da Silva (BRA) | 2:14.93 |
| 1500 metres | Eliane Vásquez (CHI) | 4:39.47 | Susana Aburto (CHI) | 4:41.16 | Silvia Paredes (ECU) | 4:43.64 |
| 3000 metres | Nadia Rodríguez (ARG) | 9:50.03 | Silvia Paredes (ECU) | 9:54.15 | Inés Melchor (PER) | 10:05.60 |
| 5000 metres | Nadia Rodríguez (ARG) | 17:08.23 | Silvia Paredes (ECU) | 17:16.88 | Patrícia Lobo (BRA) | 17:33.13 |
| 3000 metres steeplechase | Sabine Heitling (BRA) | 10:52.77 | Elena Arias (ECU) | 11:07.82 | Soledad Del Carlo (ARG) | 11:12.88 |
| 100 metres hurdles (-0.9 m/s) | Janaína Sestrem (BRA) | 13.94 | Sandrine Legenort (VEN) | 14.14 | Soledad Donzino (ARG) | 14.24 |
| 400 metres hurdles | Yusmelys García (VEN) | 58.54 | Amanda Dias (BRA) | 58.86 | Raquel da Costa (BRA) | 59.39 |
| High jump | Mônica de Freitas (BRA) | 1.74 | Marielys Rojas (VEN) | 1.71 | Daniela Carrillo (CHI); Jhoris Luque (VEN) | 1.68 |
| Pole vault | Karla da Silva (BRA) | 3.90 | Rosângela da Silva (BRA) | 3.70 | Alejandra Llorente (ARG) | 3.60 |
| Long jump | Keila Costa (BRA) | 6.37 (1.4 m/s) | Fernanda Gonçalves (BRA) | 5.99 (0.3 m/s) | Michelle Vaughn (GUY) | 5.88 (0.4 m/s) |
| Triple jump | Keila Costa (BRA) | 13.78 (-0.5 m/s) | Fernanda Gonçalves (BRA) | 12.26 (-0.6 m/s) | Michelle Vaughn (GUY) | 12.23 (-0.3 m/s) |
| Shot put | Ahymará Espinoza (VEN) | 13.97 | Jennifer Dahlgren (ARG) | 13.61 | Regiane Alves (BRA) | 13.12 |
| Discus throw | Roberta de Oliveira (BRA) | 41.85 | Jennifer Dahlgren (ARG) | 41.41 | Roberto Argentino (BRA) | 40.70 |
| Hammer throw | Jennifer Dahlgren (ARG) | 55.73 | Stefanía Żoryez (URU) | 50.54 | Adriana Benaventa (VEN) | 50.19 |
| Javelin throw | Maria Ramos (BRA) | 45.31 | Maria Cruz (BRA) | 44.31 | Adriana Benaventa (VEN) | 32.78 |
| Heptathlon | Soledad Donzino (ARG) | 5139 | Macarena Reyes (CHI) | 4683 | Bruna Gomes (BRA) | 4536 |
| 10,000 metres track walk | Alessandra Picagevicz (BRA) | 50:34.59 | Lizbeth Zúñiga (PER) | 53:20.19 | Josette Sepúlveda (CHI) | 55:13.41 |
| 4 × 100 metres relay | Brazil; Thatiana Ignâcio; Evelyn dos Santos; Alessandra Joaquim; Mônica de Freitas | 45.30 | Venezuela; Yessica Bermúdez; Angela Alfonso; Wilmary Álvarez; Sandrine Legenort | 45.58 | Chile; Daniela Riderelli; Macarena Keys; Fernanda MacKenna; Javiera Escobedo | 47.11 |
| 4 × 400 metres relay | Brazil; Juliana de Azevedo; Amanda Dias; Raquel da Costa; Ana Souza | 3:40.56 | Ecuador; Grace Arias; Lucy Jaramillo; Gabriela Chala; Mónica Ceballos | 3:45.70 | Venezuela; Angela Alfonso; Yusmelys García; Jenny Mejías; Sandrine Legenort | 3:45.78 |

== Doping ==
Eliane Pereira from Brazil was tested positive for Stanozolol, an anabolic steroid. Consequently, she lost her gold medal in 1,500 m (in 4:33.19) and her silver medal in 3,000 m (in 9:52.42), and was banned for two years.

Two further cases with enhanced Testosterone/Epitestosterone ratio were discovered (no medalists involved).

== Medal table (unofficial) ==
* Host nation (Brazil)

| Rank | Nation | Gold | Silver | Bronze | Total |
|---|---|---|---|---|---|
| 1 | Brazil* | 33 | 14 | 16 | 63 |
| 2 | Argentina | 5 | 5 | 5 | 15 |
| 3 | Venezuela | 4 | 11 | 8 | 23 |
| 4 | Chile | 1 | 5 | 9 | 15 |
| 5 | Ecuador | 1 | 5 | 2 | 8 |
| 6 | Peru | 0 | 2 | 2 | 4 |
| 7 | Guyana | 0 | 1 | 2 | 3 |
| 8 | Uruguay | 0 | 1 | 1 | 2 |
| Totals (8 entries) | | 44 | 44 | 45 | 133 |

== Final scoring per countries ==
The winners in point scoring per country were published.

The host country is highlighted in lavender blue

| Rank | Nation | Points |
|---|---|---|
| 1 | Brazil | 587 |
| 2 | Venezuela | 180.5 |
| 3 | Argentina | 163 |

== Participation (unofficial) ==
Detailed result lists can be found on the "World Junior Athletics History" website. An unofficial count yields the number of about 194 athletes (plus an unknown number of guest athletes from the Netherlands Antilles) from about 10 countries:

- Argentina (22)
- Bolivia (7)
- Brazil (69)
- Chile (29)
- Ecuador (19)
- Guyana (4)
- Paraguay (3)
- (Peru) Perú (8)
- Uruguay (3)
- Venezuela (30)

Guest Nation:

- Netherlands Antilles (unknown)
