= Karla Rosa da Silva =

Brazilian pole vaulter (born 1984)

Personal information
- Born: 12 November 1984 (age 41) Osasco, São Paulo, Brazil
- Height: 1.68 m (5 ft 6 in)
- Weight: 61 kg (134 lb)

Sport
- Country: Brazil
- Sport: Athletics
- Event: Pole vaulting
Medal record
Ibero-American Championships
Silver medal – second place	2002 Guatemala City	Pole Vault
Silver medal – second place	2010 San Fernando	Pole Vault
Silver medal – second place	2012 Barquisimeto	Pole Vault
South American Games
Gold medal – first place	2002 Belém	Pole vault
Bronze medal – third place	2014 Santiago	Pole vault
South American Championships
Gold medal – first place	2013 Cartagena	Pole vault
Silver medal – second place	2011 Buenos Aires	Pole vault
Bronze medal – third place	2015 Lima	Pole vault

Karla Rosa da Silva (born 12 November 1984) is a Brazilian athlete specializing in the pole vault. She competed at the 2013 World Championships in Athletics without reaching the final. She is a multiple regional championships medalist.

== Personal bests ==
- Pole vault: 4.53 m – (Brazil) São Paulo, 11 May 2013

She has personal best of 4.40 metres indoors (2013).

== Competition record ==
Year	Competition	Venue	Position	Notes
Representing Brazil
2001	South American Junior Championships	Santa Fe, Argentina	2nd	3.75m
2001	Pan American Junior Championships	Santa Fe, Argentina	5th	3.70 m
2002	Ibero-American Championships	Guatemala City, Guatemala	2nd	4.00 m
2002	World Junior Championships	Kingston, Jamaica	10th	3.80 m
2002	South American Junior Championships / South American Games	Belém, Brazil	1st	3.90 m
2003	South American Junior Championships	Guayaquil, Ecuador	1st	3.85 m
2003	South American Championships	Barquisimeto, Venezuela	6th	3.80 m
2003	Pan American Junior Championships	Bridgetown, Barbados	2nd	4.00 m
2006	South American Under-23 Championships / South American Games	Buenos Aires, Argentina	5th	3.80 m
2008	Ibero-American Championships	Iquique, Chile	–	NM
2009	South American Championships	Lima, Peru	4th	4.00 m
2010	Ibero-American Championships	San Fernando, Spain	2nd	4.30 m
2011	South American Championships	Buenos Aires, Argentina	2nd	4.00 m
2011	Pan American Games	Guadalajara, Mexico	4th	4.30 m
2012	Ibero-American Championships	Barquisimeto, Venezuela	2nd	4.10 m
2013	South American Championships	Cartagena, Colombia	1st	4.20 m
2013	World Championships	Moscow, Russia	19th (q)	4.30 m
2014	South American Games	Santiago, Chile	3rd	4.10 m
2014	Ibero-American Championships	São Paulo, Brazil	2nd	4.10 m
2015	South American Championships	Lima, Peru	3rd	4.10 m
2015	Pan American Games	Toronto, Canada	7th	4.15 m
2017	South American Championships	Asunción, Paraguay	5th	3.90 m
