= Ahymara Espinoza =

Venezuelan shot putter (born 1985)

Ahymará Espinoza
Personal information
- Full name: Ahymará del Carmen Espinoza Echenique
- Born: 28 May 1985 (age 41) Río Chico, Miranda, Venezuela
- Height: 170 cm (5 ft 7 in)
- Weight: 80 kg (176 lb)

Sport
- Country: Venezuela
- Sport: Athletics
- Event: Shot put

Ahymará del Carmen Espinoza Echenique (Note: In this Spanish name, the first or paternal surname is Espinoza and the second or maternal family name is Echenique.) (born 28 May 1985) is a Venezuelan athlete specialising in the shot put. She represented her country at the 2013 World Championships without qualifying for the final. Espinoza was born in Río Chico, Miranda. She competed for Venezuela at the 2016 Summer Olympics and 2020 Summer Olympics.

== Personal bests ==
- Shot put: 18.19 m – Rio de Janeiro, Brazil, 15 May 2016 – national record

== Competition record ==
Year	Competition	Venue	Position	Event	Notes
Representing Venezuela
2002	South American Junior Championships / South American Games	Belém, Brazil	1st	Shot put	13.97 m
2002	Central American and Caribbean; Junior Championships (U17)	Bridgetown, Barbados	1st	Shot put	13.97 m
2002	World Junior Championships	Kingston, Jamaica	15th (q)	Shot put	13.83 m
2002	South American Youth Championships	Asunción, Paraguay	1st	Shot put	13.93 m
2002	South American Youth Championships	Asunción, Paraguay	8th	Discus throw (1 kg)	33.26 m
2004	South American U23 Championships	Barquisimeto, Venezuela	2nd	Shot put	15.45 m
2004	World Junior Championships	Grosseto, Italy	20th (q)	Shot put	14.24 m
2005	ALBA Games	Havana, Cuba	2nd	Shot put	15.81 m
2005	Bolivarian Games	Armenia, Colombia	2nd	Shot put	15.17 m
2006	South American U23 Championships / South American Games	Buenos Aires, Argentina	2nd	Shot put	15.06 m
2007	ALBA Games	Caracas, Venezuela	6th	Shot put	14.87 m
2008	Ibero-American Championships	Iquique, Chile	3rd	Shot put	14.98 m
2009	ALBA Games	Havana, Cuba	7th	Shot put	15.24 m
2009	Bolivarian Games	Sucre, Bolivia	2nd	Shot put	16.32 m
2010	Ibero-American Championships	San Fernando, Spain	6th	Shot put	15.43 m
2011	Military World Games	Rio de Janeiro, Brazil	—	Hammer throw	NM
2011	ALBA Games	Barquisimeto, Venezuela	2nd	Shot put	15.98 m
2012	Ibero-American Championships	Barquisimeto, Venezuela	7th	Shot put	15.91 m
2013	South American Championships	Cartagena, Colombia	3rd	Shot put	17.47 m
2013	World Championships	Moscow, Russia	24th (q)	Shot put	16.86 m
2013	Bolivarian Games	Trujillo, Peru	1st	Shot put	18.15 m
2014	South American Games	Santiago, Chile	2nd	Shot put	17.63 m
2015	South American Championships	Lima, Peru	3rd	Shot put	17.25 m
2015	Pan American Games	Toronto, Canada	8th	Shot put	17.29 m
2015	World Championships	Beijing, China	21st (q)	Shot put	16.76 m
2016	Ibero-American Championships	Rio de Janeiro, Brazil	1st	Shot put	18.19 m
2016	Olympic Games	Rio de Janeiro, Brazil	19th (q)	Shot put	17.27 m
2017	Bolivarian Games	Santa Marta, Colombia	3rd	Shot put	16.57 m
2018	South American Games	Cochabamba, Bolivia	2nd	Shot put	18.09 m
2018	Central American and Caribbean Games	Barranquilla, Colombia	4th	Shot put	17.77 m
2019	South American Championships	Lima, Peru	1st	Shot put	17.44 m
2019	Pan American Games	Lima, Peru	10th	Shot put	16.49 m
2019	World Championships	Doha, Qatar	27th (q)	Shot put	16.89 m
2021	South American Championships	Guayaquil, Ecuador	2nd	Shot put	16.95 m
2021	Olympic Games	Tokyo, Japan	25th (q)	Shot put	17.17 m
2023	ALBA Games	Caracas, Venezuela	1st	Shot put	15.36 m
2023	Central American and Caribbean Games	San Salvador, El Salvador	4th	Shot put	16.75 m
2023	South American Championships	São Paulo, Brazil	4th	Shot put	16.66 m
2023	Pan American Games	Santiago, Chile	9th	Shot put	15.97 m
2024	Ibero-American Championships	Cuiabá, Brazil	5th	Shot put	16.66 m
2025	South American Championships	Mar del Plata, Argentina	2nd	Shot put	16.51 m
2025	Bolivarian Games	Lima, Peru	3rd	Shot put	17.05 m
2026	Central American and Caribbean Games	Santo Domingo, Dominican Republic	5th	Shot put	16.31 m
