= Lucy Jaramillo =

Ecuadorian hurdler (born 1983)

Personal information
- Full name: Lucecita María del Carmen Jaramillo Ogonaga
- Born: February 23, 1983 (age 43) San Vicente de Pusir, Carchi
- Height: 1.64 m (5 ft 4 1/2 in)
- Weight: 52 kg (115 lb)

Sport
- Country: Ecuador
- Sport: Athletics
- Event: 400 metres hurdles
Medal record
Representing Ecuador
Pan American Games
Silver medal – second place	2011 Guadalajara	400m hurdles
South American Games
Silver medal – second place	2002 Belem	4x100m relay
- Updated on 28 June 2013

Lucy María del Carmen Jaramillo Ogonaga (born 23 February 1983 in San Vicente de Pusir, Carchi) is an Ecuadorian hurdler. At the 2012 Summer Olympics, she competed in the Women's 400 metres hurdles.

== Personal bests ==
- 400 m: 53.15 s A – (Ecuador) Cuenca, 31 May 2012
- 800 m: 2:08.77 min – (Colombia) Cali, 24 July 2005
- 100 m hurdles: 14.65 s A (wind: -0.9 m/s) – (Ecuador) Cuenca, 6 June 2008
- 400 m hurdles: 56.50 s NR – (Colombia) Cali, 24 June 2012

== Competition record ==
Year	Competition	Venue	Position	Event	Notes
Representing Ecuador
2000	South American Youth Championships	Bogotá, Colombia	8th	200 m	26.13 s A (wind: -3.3 m/s)
2000	South American Youth Championships	Bogotá, Colombia	4th	400 m	56.23 s A
2000	South American Youth Championships	Bogotá, Colombia	4th	Medley Relay 800m (100m x 100m x 200m x 400m)	2:16.56 min A
2001	South American Championships	Manaus, Brazil	6th	400 m	57.93 s
2001	South American Championships	Manaus, Brazil	5th	400 m hurdles	65.48 s
2001	South American Championships	Manaus, Brazil	5th	4 × 100 m relay	49.27 s
2001	South American Championships	Manaus, Brazil	4th	4 × 400 m relay	3.50.71 min
2001	Bolivarian Games	Ambato, Ecuador	3rd	400 m hurdles	60.89 s A
2001	Bolivarian Games	Ambato, Ecuador	2nd	4 × 400 m relay	3:44.38 min A
2001	South American Junior Championships	Santa Fe, Argentina	7th	400 m	57.95 s
2001	South American Junior Championships	Santa Fe, Argentina	5th	400 m hurdles	62.01 s
2001	Pan American Junior Championships	Santa Fe, Argentina	4th (h)	400 m	57.42 s
2001	Pan American Junior Championships	Santa Fe, Argentina	3rd	400 m hurdles	59.82 s
2002	Ibero-American Championships	Guatemala City, Guatemala	9th (h)	400 m	56.63 s A
2002	Ibero-American Championships	Guatemala City, Guatemala	4th	400 m hurdles	60.84 s A
2002	World Junior Championships	Kingston, Jamaica	18th (h)	400 m hurdles	62.97 s
2002	South American Junior Championships / South American Games	Belém, Brazil	5th	400m	56.73 s
2002	South American Junior Championships / South American Games	Belém, Brazil	4th	400m hurdles	62.12 s
2002	South American Junior Championships / South American Games	Belém, Brazil	5th	4 × 100 m relay	48.82 s
2002	South American Junior Championships / South American Games	Belém, Brazil	2nd	4 × 400 m relay	3:45.70 min
2003	South American Championships	Barquisimeto, Venezuela	7th	400 m	55.43 s
2003	South American Championships	Barquisimeto, Venezuela	6th	400 m hurdles	60.98 s
2003	South American Championships	Barquisimeto, Venezuela	6th	4 × 400 m relay	3:53.23 min
2004	South American U23 Championships	Barquisimeto, Venezuela	2nd	400m	54.52 s
2004	South American U23 Championships	Barquisimeto, Venezuela	3rd	400m hurdles	60.65 s
2004	Ibero-American Championships	Huelva, Spain	7th	400 m	54.83 s
2005	South American Championships	Cali, Colombia	5th	400 m	54.70 s
2005	South American Championships	Cali, Colombia	4th	800 m	2:08.77 min
2005	South American Championships	Cali, Colombia	3rd	400 m hurdles	59.78 s
2005	South American Championships	Cali, Colombia	4th	4 × 400 m relay	3:52.76 min
2005	Bolivarian Games	Armenia, Colombia	2nd	400 m	53.76 s A
2005	Bolivarian Games	Armenia, Colombia	1st	400 m hurdles	57.58 s A
2005	Bolivarian Games	Armenia, Colombia	3rd	4 × 400 m relay	3:45.12 min A
2006	South American Championships	Tunja, Colombia	4th	400 m	53.95 s A
2006	South American Championships	Tunja, Colombia	3rd	400 m hurdles	58.93 s
2006	South American Championships	Tunja, Colombia	3rd	4 × 100 m relay	47.47 s A
2006	South American Championships	Tunja, Colombia	3rd	4 × 400 m relay	3:47.58 min
2007	South American Championships	São Paulo, Brazil	3rd	400 m	53.44 s (NR)
2007	South American Championships	São Paulo, Brazil	3rd	400 m hurdles	58.81 s
2007	South American Championships	São Paulo, Brazil	4th	4 × 100 m relay	47.21 s
2007	Pan American Games	Rio de Janeiro, Brazil	20th (h)	400 m	54.55 s
2007	Pan American Games	Rio de Janeiro, Brazil	11th (h)	400 m hurdles	60.30 s
2007	Pan American Games	Rio de Janeiro, Brazil	8th	4 × 400 m relay	3:43.88 min
2007	Universiade	Bangkok, Thailand	7th (sf)	400 m	55.05 s
2007	Universiade	Bangkok, Thailand	14th (h)	400 m hurdles	59.67 s
2008	Ibero-American Championships	Iquique, Chile	8th	400 m	57.74 s
2008	Ibero-American Championships	Iquique, Chile	3rd	400 m hurdles	57.9 s
2009	ALBA Games	Havana, Cuba	5th (h)	400 m	55.40 s
2009	ALBA Games	Havana, Cuba	6th	400 m hurdles	59.86 s
2009	ALBA Games	Havana, Cuba	3rd	4 × 400 m relay	3:45.70 min
2009	South American Championships	Lima, Peru	5th	400 m	55.74 s
2009	South American Championships	Lima, Peru	2nd	400 m hurdles	58.45 s
2009	South American Championships	Lima, Peru	3rd	4 × 400 m relay	3:45.99 min
2009	Bolivarian Games	Sucre, Bolivia	1st	400 m	52.9 s A
2009	Bolivarian Games	Sucre, Bolivia	1st	400 m hurdles	57.77 s A
2009	Bolivarian Games	Sucre, Bolivia	3rd	4 × 100 m relay	46.28 s A
2009	Bolivarian Games	Sucre, Bolivia	3rd	4 × 400 m relay	3:41.42 min A
2010	Ibero-American Championships	San Fernando, Spain	8th	400 m hurdles	60.35 s
2011	South American Championships	Buenos Aires, Argentina	5th	400 m hurdles	60.97 s
2011	ALBA Games	Barquisimeto, Venezuela	3rd	400 m	55.97 s
2011	ALBA Games	Barquisimeto, Venezuela	1st	400 m hurdles	61.27 s
2011	ALBA Games	Barquisimeto, Venezuela	3rd	4 × 100 m relay	48.02 s
2011	Pan American Games	Guadalajara, Mexico	2nd	400 m hurdles	56.95 s
2011	Pan American Games	Guadalajara, Mexico	6th	4 × 400 m relay	3:45.59 min
2012	Ibero-American Championships	Barquisimeto, Venezuela	5th	400 m hurdles	57.81 s
2012	Ibero-American Championships	Barquisimeto, Venezuela	6th	4 × 400 m relay	3:50.37 min
2012	Olympic Games	London, United Kingdom	33rd (h)	400 m hurdles	57.74 s
