= Nico Herrera =

Venezuelan middle-distance runner

Personal information
- Born: 31 July 1983 (age 42)

Sport
- Sport: Track and field
Medal record
Representing Venezuela
South American Games
Silver medal – second place	2002 Belem	1500m
Silver medal – second place	2002 Belem	4x400m relay

Nico José Herrera (born 31 July 1983) is a Venezuelan athlete specializing in the middle distance events.

He has personal bests of 1:48.60 in the 800 metres (2009) and 3:42.18 in the 1500 metres (2007).

== Competition record ==
Year	Competition	Venue	Position	Event	Notes
Representing Venezuela
2002	South American Junior Championships / South American Games	Belém, Brazil	5th	800m	1:53.23
2002	South American Junior Championships / South American Games	Belém, Brazil	2nd	1500m	3:55.67
2002	South American Junior Championships / South American Games	Belém, Brazil	2nd	4 × 400 m relay	3:11.20
2004	South American U23 Championships	Barquisimeto, Venezuela	2nd	1500 m	3:48.25
2006	Central American and Caribbean Games	Cartagena, Colombia	5th	1500 m	3:46.56
2007	Pan American Games	Rio de Janeiro, Brazil	7th	1500 m	3:42.18
2008	Ibero-American Championships	Iquique, Chile	7th	1500 m	3:44.66
2008	Ibero-American Championships	Iquique, Chile	6th	3000 m	8:05.52
2008	Central American and Caribbean Championships	Cali, Colombia	5th	800 m	1:48.85
2008	Central American and Caribbean Championships	Cali, Colombia	2nd	1500 m	3:45.39
2009	South American Championships	Lima, Peru	3rd	800 m	1:49.53
2009	South American Championships	Lima, Peru	5th	1500 m	3:45.12
2009	Central American and Caribbean Championships	Havana, Cuba	5th	800 m	1:48.43
2009	Central American and Caribbean Championships	Havana, Cuba	5th	1500 m	3:44.66
2010	Ibero-American Championships	San Fernando, Spain	8th	800 m	1:50.86
2010	Ibero-American Championships	San Fernando, Spain	5th	1500 m	3:45.54
2010	Central American and Caribbean Games	Mayagüez, Puerto Rico	12th (h)	800 m	1:50.88
2010	Central American and Caribbean Games	Mayagüez, Puerto Rico	4th	1500 m	3:48.97
2011	Central American and Caribbean Championships	Mayagüez, Puerto Rico	1st	1500 m	3:44.92
2011	Pan American Games	Guadalajara, Mexico	6th (h)	800 m	1:49.29
2011	Pan American Games	Guadalajara, Mexico	7th	1500 m	3:56.30
2012	Ibero-American Championships	Barquisimeto, Venezuela	7th	3000 m	8:26.10
