= Silvia Paredes =

Ecuadorian long-distance runner

Personal information
- Full name: Silvia Alexandra Paredes Yucailla
- Born: 23 January 1983 (age 43)
- Height: 1.56 m (5 ft 1 in)
- Weight: 56 kg (123 lb)

Sport
- Sport: Track and field
- Event: Marathon

Silvia Alexandra Paredes Yucailla (born 23 January 1983) is an Ecuadorian long-distance runner who specialises in the marathon. She competed in the women's marathon event at the 2016 Summer Olympics.
