= 2004 South American Under-23 Championships in Athletics =

I South American Under-23 Championships in Athletics
- Dates: June 26–27
- Host city: Barquisimeto, Venezuela
- Venue: Polideportivo Máximo Viloria
- Level: U-23
- Events: 44
- Participation: 310 athletes from 13 + 4 guest nations nations

The 1st South American Under-23 Championships in Athletics were held in Barquisimeto, Venezuela, at the Polideportivo Máximo Viloria on June 26–27, 2004.

== Participation ==
A total of 310 athletes from 13 countries were announced to participate:

Argentina (29), Bolivia (5), Brazil (84), Chile (43), Colombia (36), Ecuador (24), Guyana (4), Panamá (2), Paraguay (3), Perú (5), Surinam (2), Uruguay (6), Venezuela (68). Athletes from the Dominican Republic (4), from the Netherlands Antilles (4), and from Trinidad and Tobago (11) were invited as guest athletes in accordance with the regulations of CONSUDATLE. In addition, one source also lists results from 4 athletes representing Saint Kitts and Nevis.

== Medal summary ==
Medal winners are published. Detailed results can be found on the CACAC website, and on the Tilastopaja website,

=== Men ===
Event	Gold		Silver		Bronze	
100 metres (0.0 m/s)	Bruno Pacheco (BRA)	10.28	Eliezer de Almeida (BRA)	10.31	Daniel Grueso (COL)	10.52 =NRj
200 metres (0.0 m/s)	Bruno Pacheco (BRA)	20.75	Basílio de Morães (BRA)	21.06	Wilmer Rivas (VEN)	21.30
400 metres	Andrés Silva (URU)	45.80 NR AJR	Luis Luna (VEN)	46.03	Luís Ambrósio (BRA)	46.46
800 metres	Byron Piedra (ECU)	1:47.43	Simoncito Silvera (VEN)	1:47.53	Fabiano Peçanha (BRA)	1:48.66
1500 metres	Byron Piedra (ECU)	3:46.37	Nico Herrera (VEN)	3:48.25	Leslie Encina (CHI)	3:50.40
5000 metres	Manuel Bellorín (VEN)	14:52.11	Oscar Lesmes (COL)	14:53.59	Eduardo Villanueva (VEN)	15:52.40
10000 metres	João Augusto Stingelin (BRA)	30:51.13	John Cusi (PER)	31:18.13	Leslie Encina (CHI)	31:20.36
3000 metres steeplechase	Mariano Mastromarino (ARG)	8:54.92	Jean Carlos Calzadilla (VEN)	8:56.55	Sergio Lobos (CHI)	9:01.44
110 metres hurdles (-0.4 m/s)	Maurício Teixeira (BRA)	14.03	Francisco Schilling (CHI)	14.23	Marleán Reyna (VEN)	14.45
400 metres hurdles	Sebastián Lasquera (ARG)	50.48	Diego Venâncio (BRA)	50.49	Raphael Fernandes (BRA)	50.84
High jump	Fábio Baptista (BRA)	2.14	Ederson de Oliveira (BRA)	2.05	Daniel Rodríguez (VEN)	2.00
Pole vault	Jorge Naranjo (CHI)	5.20	José Francisco Nava (CHI)	5.00	Guillermo Chiaraviglio (ARG)	5.00
Long jump	Irving Saladino (PAN)	7.74 (-0.2 m/s)	Rogério da Silva Bispo (BRA)	7.69 (1.8 m/s)	Luis Tristán (PER)	7.25 (-0.8 m/s)
Triple jump	Jefferson Sabino (BRA)	16.27 (-1.3 m/s)	José Francisco Nava (CHI)	14.85 (-2.2 m/s)	Oscar Alvarenga (PAR)	14.70 (-1.5 m/s)
Shot put	Gustavo de Mendonça (BRA)	17.21	Jiovanny García (COL)	17.16	Edmundo Martínez (VEN)	17.14
Discus throw	Héctor Hurtado (VEN)	54.75	Gustavo de Mendonça (BRA)	52.75	Germán Lauro (ARG)	50.56
Hammer throw	Roberto Sáez (CHI)	63.95	Wagner Domingos (BRA)	63.86	Armando dos Santos (BRA)	62.96
Javelin throw	Alexon Maximiano (BRA)	71.49	Júlio César de Oliveira (BRA)	71.49	Arley Ibargüen (COL)	70.05
Decathlon	Leandro Peyrano (ARG)	6993	Fagner Martins (BRA)	6852	Andrés Horacio Mantilla (COL)	6816
20000 metres Track Walk	Gustavo Restrepo (COL)	1:26:59.60	Rafael dos Anjos Duarte (BRA)	1:27:19.85	Xavier Malacatus (ECU)	1:31:06.42
4 x 100 metres relay	Brazil; Eliezer de Almeida; Paulo Roberto; Basílio de Morães; Bruno Pacheco	39.42	Colombia; Wilmer Alberto Murillo; Jhon Valoyes; Daniel Grueso; Eduar Mena	40.24	Chile; Iván Sandoval; Kael Becerra; Diego Valdés; Benjamín Bravo	41.07
4 x 400 metres relay	Brazil; Luís Eduardo Ambrosio; Diego Chargal; Diego Venâncio; Paulo Roberto	3:06.85	Venezuela; José Faneite; Simoncito Silvera; Víctor José Solarte; Luis Luna	3:09.00	Argentina; Sebastián Lasquera; Mariano Jiménez; Pablo Cabrera; José Ignacio Pignataro	3:12.02

=== Women ===
Event	Gold		Silver		Bronze	
100 metres (0.0 m/s)	Thatiana Ignácio (BRA)	11.63	Melisa Murillo (COL)	11.78	Raquel da Costa (BRA)	11.86
200 metres (0.0 m/s)	Darlenis Obregón (COL)	23.76	María Fernanda Mackenna (CHI)	24.47	Amanda Dias (BRA)	24.55
400 metres	Joyce Prieto (BRA)	54.38	Lucy Jaramillo (ECU)	54.52	Ángela Elisabeth Alfonso (VEN)	54.77
800 metres	Rejane Bispo da Silva (BRA)	2:09.88	Marcela Britos (URU)	2:10.14	Yenny Mejías (VEN)	2:10.15
1500 metres**	Mónica Amboya (ECU)	4:27.30	Kamila Govorcín (CHI)	4:33.05	Yolanda Caballero (COL)	4:37.62
5000 metres	Zenaide Vieira (BRA)	17:38.28	Rosa Chacha (ECU)	17:44.04	Karina Córdoba (ARG)	17:47.34
10000 metres	Rosa Chacha (ECU)	36:23.73	Ruby Riativa (COL)	36:28.67	Luz Maldonado (VEN)	36:42.10
3000 metres steeplechase	Mónica Amboya (ECU)	10:20.39	Yolanda Caballero (COL)	10:24.09 NR	Ángela Figueroa (COL)	10:39.12
100 metres hurdles (-0.9 m/s)	Brigith Merlano (COL)	13.57	Sandrine Legenort (VEN)	13.79 NR	Fabiana Morães (BRA)	14.11
400 metres hurdles	Yusmelys García (VEN)	59.80	Jessica Miller (URU)	59.84	Lucy Jaramillo (ECU)	60.65
High jump	Catherine Ibargüen (COL)	1.91 NR	Jhoris Luque (VEN)	1.82	Mônica de Freitas (BRA)	1.76
Pole vault*	Milena Agudelo (COL)	3.90	Pamela Barnert (CHI)	3.80	Rosângela da Silva (BRA)	3.70
Long jump	Keila Costa (BRA)	6.19 (1.6 m/s)	Catherine Ibargüen (COL)	6.05 (0.9 m/s)	Tânia Ferreira da Silva (BRA)	6.05 (-0.7 m/s)
Triple jump	Keila Costa (BRA)	13.62 (0.3 m/s)	Jennifer Arveláez (VEN)	13.16 (0.9 m/s)	Tânia Ferreira da Silva (BRA)	12.78w (2.2 m/s)
Shot put	Paola Cheppi (ARG)	15.81	Ahymará Espinoza (VEN)	15.45 NRj	Jennifer Dahlgren (ARG)	14.34
Discus throw	Claudia Ullmann (ARG)	44.54	Karen Gallardo (CHI)	44.00	Rita da Conceição Neres (BRA)	43.70
Hammer throw	Jennifer Dahlgren (ARG)	65.17	Adriana Benaventa (VEN)	59.18	Stefanía Zoryez (URU)	58.22
Javelin throw	Leryn Franco (PAR)	51.53	María González (VEN)	51.01	Mariela Aguer (ARG)	45.99
Heptathlon	Thaimara Rivas (VEN)	5537	Melry Caldeira (BRA)	5218	Valeria Steffens (CHI)	5001
20000 metres Track Walk	Cisiane Lopes (BRA)	1:46:45.03	Marcela Pacheco (CHI)	1:47:37.12	Josette Sepúlveda (CHI)	1:48:56.46
4 x 100 metres relay	Brazil; Alessandra Matos; Racquel da Costa; Amanda Dias; Thatiana Ignâcio	45.36	Chile; María José Echeverría; María Fernanda Mackenna; Daniela Pávez; Daniela Riderelli	45.67	Venezuela; Jackeline Carabalí; Ángela Elizabeth Alfonso; María Mercedes Ochoa; Sandrine Legenort	47.32
4 x 400 metres relay	Brazil	3:40.05	Chile	3:42.61	Venezuela	3:48.38

* Keisa Monterola from Venezuela was then only 16 years old and could not officially participate at the championships. Out of competition, she cleared 3.80m in the first attempt, which would have placed her in the second place of the competition.

** Some sources list Jéssica Quispe from Perú to finish second in 4:27.68 in the 1500m women's event. Just as pole vaulter Keisa Monterola, she might have started out of competition because of her age (she was then only 17 years old).

== Medal table (unofficial) ==
* Host nation (Venezuela)

Rank	Nation	Gold	Silver	Bronze	Total
1	Brazil	19	11	12	42
2	Argentina	6	0	6	12
3	Colombia	5	7	5	17
4	Ecuador	5	2	2	9
5	Venezuela*	4	11	10	25
6	Chile	2	10	6	18
7	Uruguay	1	2	1	4
8	Paraguay	1	0	1	2
9	Panama	1	0	0	1
10	Peru	0	1	1	2
Totals (10 entries)		44	44	44	132

== Team trophies ==
The final scoring per country for the team trophy was published.

=== Overall ===
The host country is highlighted in lavender blue

Rank	Nation	Points
1st place, gold medalist(s)	Brazil	486
2nd place, silver medalist(s)	Venezuela	230
3rd place, bronze medalist(s)	Chile	167
4	Argentina	138
4	Colombia	138
6	Ecuador	92
7	Uruguay	26
8	Peru	16
9	Paraguay	14
10	Panama	10
11	Bolivia	3
11	Guyana	3
