= Alex Lopes =

Brazilian footballer (born 1989)

Personal information
- Full name: Alex Pereira Lopes
- Date of birth: May 16, 1989 (age 37)
- Place of birth: Nova Iguaçu, Brazil
- Height: 1.86 m (6 ft 1 in)
- Position: Right-back

Team information
- Current team: Duque de Caxias

Youth career
- 2007–2009: Botafogo

Senior career*
Years	Team	Apps	(Gls)
2009–2013	Botafogo		
2011	→ Duque de Caxias (loan)		
2012–2013	→ Bangu (loan)		
2014	Bangu		
2015	Estanciano		
2016–	Duque de Caxias		
- * Club domestic league appearances and goals as of 30 September 2017

Alex Pereira Lopes (born May 16, 1989) is a Brazilian footballer who plays as a right-back for Duque de Caxias.

== Career ==
Lopes was recruited in the Botafogo youth ranks the player competed in the tournament Otávio Pinto Guimaraes where he was one of the highlights of the team in 2008. In the same year, he competed in the Campeonato Brasileiro Sub-20.

In 2009, he arrived at the team's professional alvinegro at the request of coach Ney Franco and played in the 2009 Campeonato Brasileiro Série A.

Lopes currently plays for Botafogo.
