= Diego Valdés (athlete) =

Chilean sprinter (born 1983)

Personal information
- Nationality: Chilean
- Born: 21 March 1983 (age 43)

Sport
- Sport: Sprinting
- Event: 4 × 100 metres relay

Diego Valdés (born 21 March 1983) is a Chilean sprinter. He competed in the men's 4 × 100 metres relay at the 2000 Summer Olympics.
