= 2005 South American Championships in Athletics =

43rd South American Championships
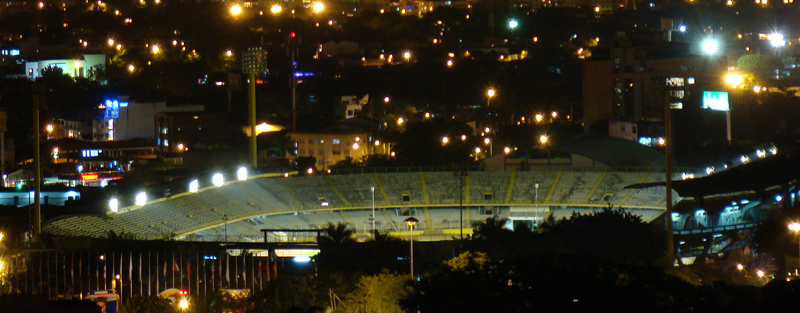
- Host stadium in Cali.
- Dates: 21–24 July 2005
- Host city: Cali, Colombia
- Venue: Estadio Olímpico Pascual Guerrero
- Events: 44
- Records set: ? Championships records

The 2005 South American Championships in Athletics were held at the Estadio Olímpico Pascual Guerrero in Cali, Colombia from July 21 to July 24, 2005. Detailed day-by-day reports can be found on the IAAF website.

== Medal summary ==
=== Men's events ===
Event	Gold		Silver		Bronze	
100 metres	André da Silva; Brazil	10.32	Vicente de Lima; Brazil	10.37	Heber Viera; Uruguay	10.43
200 metres	André da Silva; Brazil	20.33w	Heber Viera; Uruguay	20.62w	Geronimo Goeloe; Netherlands Antilles	20.80w
400 metres	Andrés Silva; Uruguay	45.38	Sanderlei Parrela; Brazil	45.83	Gustavo Aguirre; Argentina	46.43
800 metres	Fabiano Peçanha; Brazil	1:47.02	Diego Chargal Gomes; Brazil	1:48.30	John Chávez; Colombia	1:48.65
1500 metres	Fabiano Peçanha; Brazil	3:41.51	Byron Piedra; Ecuador	3:41.90	Javier Carriqueo; Argentina	3:45.53
5000 metres	Byron Piedra; Ecuador	14:12.24	Jacinto López; Colombia	14:14.07	Javier Carriqueo; Argentina	14:19.10
10000 metres	José Carrasco; Colombia	30:07.24	John Cusi; Peru	30:14.74	Diego Colorado; Colombia	30:15.55
3000 metres steeplechase	Mariano Mastromarino; Argentina	9:02.89	Fernando Fernandes; Brazil	9:04.46	Sergio Lobos; Chile	9:08.59
110 metres hurdles	Redelen dos Santos; Brazil	13.46w	Paulo Villar; Colombia	13.49w	Mateus Inocencio; Brazil	13.72w
400 metres hurdles	Tiago Bueno; Brazil	50.87	Víctor Solarte; Venezuela	51.00	Cleverson da Silva; Brazil	52.32
4 × 100 metres relay	Brazil; André da Silva; Vicente de Lima; Jorge Célio Sena; José Carlos Moreira	39.17	Colombia; Harlin Echavarría; Eduard Mena; Daniel Grueso; Nicoll Navas	39.85	Ecuador; Andrés Gallegos; Oscar Mina; Hugo Chila; Luis Morán	40.45
4 × 400 metres relay	Brazil; Luís Ambrosio; Sanderlei Parrela; Thiago Chyaromont; Wagner Souza	3:04.15	Colombia; Amílcar Torres; Franklin Murillo; Javier Mosquera; Carlos Peña	3:05.94	Argentina; Gustavo Aguirre; Iván Altamirano; Christian Deymonnaz; José Ignacio Pignataro	3:08.61
20000 metres track walk	Jefferson Pérez; Ecuador	1:22:54.4 CR	Rolando Saquipay; Ecuador	1:22:55.4	Luis Fernando López; Colombia	1:23:43.2
High jump	Gilmar Mayo; Colombia	2.22	Erasmo Jara; Argentina	2.19	Rodrigo Santos; Brazil	2.16
Pole vault	Fábio Gomes da Silva; Brazil	5.40 =CR	Javier Benítez; Argentina	5.20	Germán Chiaraviglio; Argentina	5.10
Long jump	Erivaldo Vieira; Brazil	8.15 CR	Thiago Dias; Brazil	7.93	Esteban Copland; Venezuela	7.92
Triple jump	Jefferson Sabino; Brazil	16.24	Hugo Chila; Ecuador	15.91	Carlos Carabalí; Colombia	15.85
Shot put	Marco Antonio Verni; Chile	18.43	Yojer Medina; Venezuela	18.32	Jhonny Rodríguez; Colombia	18.22
Discus throw	Jorge Balliengo; Argentina	60.97 CR	Marcelo Pugliese; Argentina	56.76	Ronald Julião; Brazil	56.51
Hammer throw	Juan Cerra; Argentina	72.03	Wagner Domingos; Brazil	67.33	Patricio Palma; Chile	67.10
Javelin throw	Luiz Fernando da Silva; Brazil	79.44	Júlio César de Oliveira; Brazil	73.60	Noraldo Palacios; Colombia	73.54
Decathlon	Jorge Naranjo; Chile	7489	Ivan da Silva; Brazil	7437	Andrés Mantilla; Colombia	7383
WR world record | AR area record | CR championship record | GR games record | NR national record | OR Olympic record | PB personal best | SB season best | WL world leading (in a given season)

=== Women's events ===
Event	Gold		Silver		Bronze	
100 metres	Lucimar de Moura; Brazil	11.25	Melisa Murillo; Colombia	11.39	Luciana dos Santos; Brazil	11.46
200 metres	Lucimar de Moura; Brazil	22.98w	Felipa Palacios; Colombia	23.14w	Wilmary Álvarez; Venezuela	23.14w
400 metres	Maria Laura Almirao; Brazil	52.32	Geisa Coutinho; Brazil	52.94	Wilmary Álvarez; Venezuela	53.57
800 metres	Rosibel García; Colombia	2:03.28	Jenny Mejías; Venezuela	2:04.93	Perla dos Santos; Brazil	2:06.04
1500 metres	Rosibel García; Colombia	4:29.63	María Peralta; Argentina	4:30.37	Valeria Rodríguez; Argentina	4:31.35
5000 metres	Bertha Sánchez; Colombia	16:47.03	Lucélia Peres; Brazil	17:03.55	Nadir Sabino Siqueira; Brazil	17:16.33
10000 metres	Bertha Sánchez; Colombia	34:34.40	Lucélia Peres; Brazil	34:51.12	Ruby Riativa; Colombia	35:38.02
3000 metres steeplechase	Patrícia Lobo; Brazil	10:36.21	Mónica Amboya; Ecuador	10:43.67	Yolanda Caballero; Colombia	10:48.36
100 metres hurdles	Maíla Machado; Brazil	13.18	Princesa Oliveros; Chile	13.51	Brigith Merlano; Colombia	13.68
400 metres hurdles	Perla dos Santos; Brazil	58.33	Lucimar Teodoro; Brazil	59.27	Lucy Jaramillo; Ecuador	59.78
4 × 100 metres relay	Colombia; Melisa Murillo; Felipa Palacios; Darlenys Obregón; Norma González	43.17 CR	Brazil; Luciana dos Santos; Lucimar de Moura; Raquel da Costa; Thatiana Regina Ignâcio	44.35	Chile; María José Echeverría; Daniela Riderelli; María Fernanda Mackenna; Nicole Manríquez	45.37
4 × 400 metres relay	Brazil; Amanda Dias; Geisa Coutinho; Maria Laura Almirao; Lucimar Teodoro	3:29.24	Colombia; María Alejandra Idrobo; Rosibel García; Felipa Palacios; Norma González	3:36.95	Chile; María José Echeverría; Daniela Riderelli; María Fernanda Mackenna; Nicole Manríquez	3:40.49
20000 metres track walk	Sandra Zapata; Colombia	1:40:54.20	Tatiana Orellana; Ecuador	1:45:12.40	Gianetti Bonfim; Brazil	1:47:16.10
High jump	Caterine Ibargüen; Colombia	1.93 CR, NR	Solange Witteveen; Argentina	1.88	Eliana da Silva; Brazil; Marielys Rojas; Venezuela	1.79
Pole vault	Joana Costa; Brazil	4.20	Fabiana Murer; Brazil	4.00	Milena Agudelo; Colombia	4.00
Long jump	Luciana dos Santos; Brazil	6.39	Keila Costa; Brazil	6.32	Caterine Ibargüen; Colombia	6.30
Triple jump	Gisele de Oliveira; Brazil	13.90	Keila Costa; Brazil	13.75	Caterine Ibargüen; Colombia	13.59
Shot put	Andréa Pereira; Brazil	16.60	Luz Dary Castro; Colombia	16.27	Rosario Ramos; Venezuela	14.67
Discus throw	Luz Dary Castro; Colombia	53.49	Rosario Ramos; Venezuela	52.46	Renata de Figueiredo; Brazil	51.74
Hammer throw	Jennifer Dahlgren; Argentina	65.05 CR	Johana Moreno; Colombia	61.65	Rosa Rodríguez; Venezuela	61.51
Javelin throw	Alessandra Resende; Brazil	56.06	Zuleima Araméndiz; Colombia	54.81	Romina Maggi; Argentina	48.76
Heptathlon	Elizete da Silva; Brazil	5429	Andrea Bordalejo; Argentina	5249	Daniela Crespo; Argentina	5170
WR world record | AR area record | CR championship record | GR games record | NR national record | OR Olympic record | PB personal best | SB season best | WL world leading (in a given season)

== Medal table ==
Rank	Nation	Gold	Silver	Bronze	Total
1	Brazil (BRA)	25	16	10	51
2	Colombia (COL)	10	11	13	34
3	Argentina (ARG)	4	6	8	18
4	Ecuador (ECU)	2	5	2	9
5	Chile (CHI)	2	0	4	6
6	Uruguay (URU)	1	1	1	3
7	Venezuela (VEN)	0	4	6	10
8	Peru (PER)	0	1	0	1
9	Netherlands Antilles (AHO)	0	0	1	1
Totals (9 entries)		44	44	45	133

== See also ==
- 2005 in athletics (track and field)
