= Athletics at the 2006 South American Games =

Athletics at the VIII South American Games
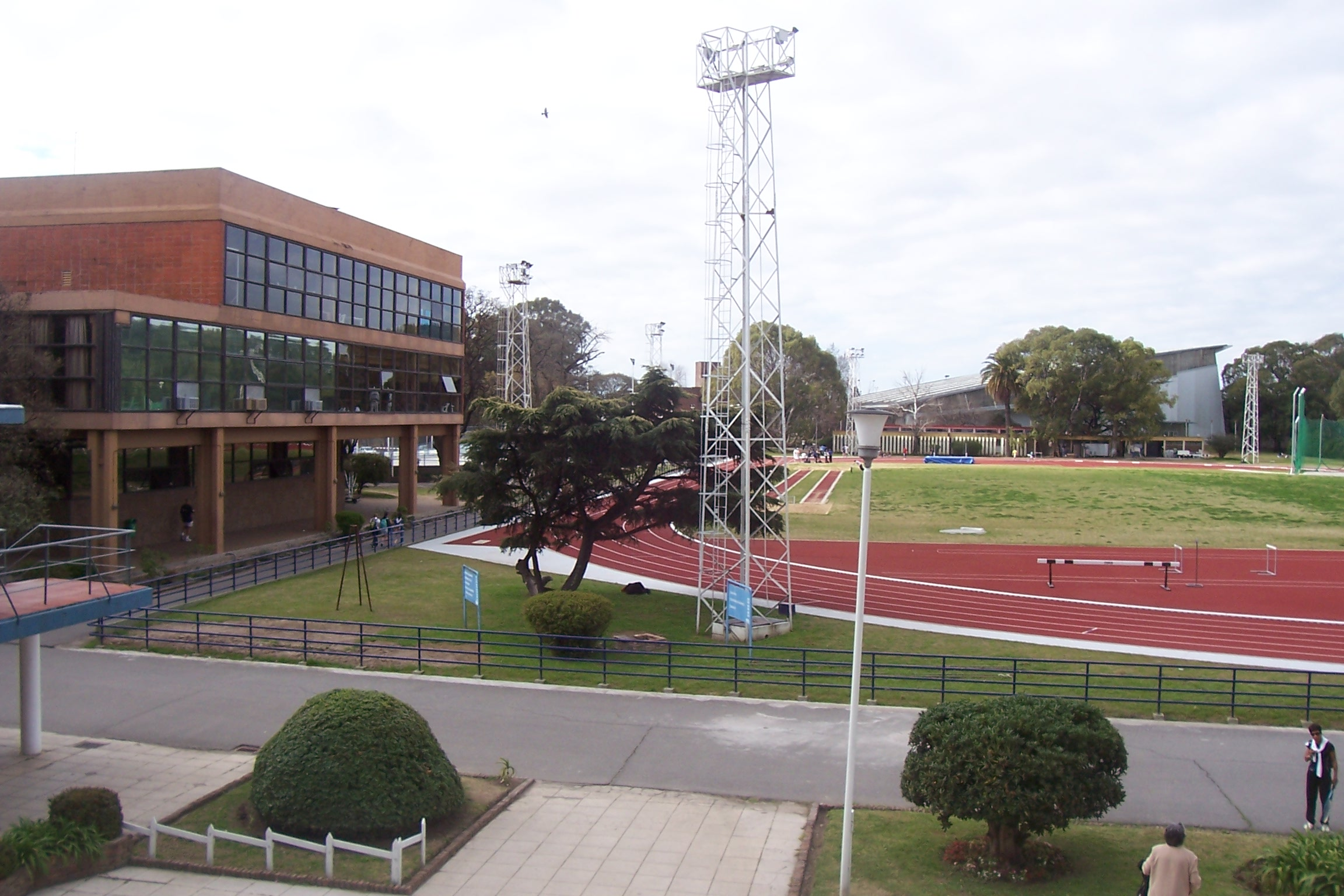
- Centro Nacional de Alto Rendimiento Deportivo (CeNARD) in the Núñez district of Buenos Aires, Argentina.
- Dates: November 10–12
- Host city: Buenos Aires, Argentina
- Venue: Centro Nacional de Alto Rendimiento Deportivo
- Level: U-23
- Events: 44 (22 men, 22 women)
- Participation: 410 athletes from 11 nations

Athletics events at the 2006 South American Games were held at the Centro Nacional de Alto Rendimiento Deportivo in Buenos Aires, Argentina, between November 10–12, 2006.

On this mentioned year, participation was restricted to athletes younger than 23 years old. The competition also served as the 2nd South American Under-23 Championships. A detailed report on the results was given.

A total of 44 events were contested, 22 events for men and 22 events for women.

== Participation ==
410 athletes from 11 countries (all CONSUDATLE members except Panamá and Suriname) were reported to participate at the South American Under-23 Championships. However, an unofficial count through the result lists resulted only in 266 participating athletes:

- Argentina (55)
- Bolivia (6)
- Brazil (65)
- Chile (35)
- Colombia (35)
- Ecuador (17)
- Guyana (1)
- Paraguay (9)
- Peru (11)
- Uruguay (6)
- Venezuela (26)

There is no hint on participation of athletes from Aruba and Netherlands Antilles (ODESUR members, but not CONSUDATLE members).

== Medal summary ==
Medal winners for the South American Games were published in a book written by Argentinian journalist Ernesto Rodríguez III, with the support of the Argentine Olympic Committee (Spanish: Comité Olímpico Argentino) under the auspices of the Ministry of Education (Spanish: Ministerio de Educación de la Nación), and in collaboration with the Office of Sports (Spanish: Secretaría de Deporte de la Nación). Eduardo Biscayart supplied the list of winners and their results.

Medal winners for the South American Under-23 Championships as well as detailed results were also published.

There is no indication for a cancellation of certain events or reduction of awardees because of an insufficient participation for this year's South American Games compared to the previous years. Therefore, the results are identical to the South American Under-23 Championships.

== Medal table (unofficial) ==
The unofficial medal count is identical to the medal count of the South American Under-23 Championships, and is shown elsewhere .
