= 1999 South American Junior Championships in Athletics =

XXXI South American Junior Championships in Athletics
- Dates: October 22–23
- Host city: Concepción, Chile
- Level: Junior
- Events: 43
- Participation: about 278 athletes from 11 nations

The 31st South American Junior Championships in Athletics were held in Concepción, Chile from October 22–23, 1999.

== Participation (unofficial) ==
Detailed result lists can be found on the "World Junior Athletics History" website. An unofficial count yields the number of about 278 athletes from about 11 countries: Argentina (47), Bolivia (9), Brazil (63), Chile (59), Colombia (15), Ecuador (30), Panama (4), Paraguay (4), Peru (15), Uruguay (10), Venezuela (22).

== Medal summary ==
Medal winners are published for men and women Complete results can be found on the "World Junior Athletics History" website.

=== Men ===
Event	Gold		Silver		Bronze	
100 metres	Jarbas Mascarenhas (BRA)	10.46	Matías Fayos (ARG)	10.58	Helly Ollarves (VEN)	10.67
200 metres	Jorge Maidana (ARG)	21.47	Matías Fayos (ARG)	21.50	Jagnner Palacios (COL)	21.58
400 metres	William Hernández (VEN)	47.28	Jorge Maidana (ARG)	48.10	Guillermo Mayer (CHI)	48.24
800 metres	Jonathan Palma (VEN)	1:51.36	David Tapia (ARG)	1:51.79	Carlos da Silva (BRA)	1:52.18
1500 metres	Glauco da Silva (BRA)	3:53.67	Sebastián González Cabot (ARG)	3:54.95	Thiago Cecatto (BRA)	3:56.26
5000 metres	Jonathan Matos (BRA)	14:46.34	Osmário Reis (BRA)	14:47.65	Ricardo Franzón (ARG)	14:49.85
10,000 metres	Jonathan Matos (BRA)	30:23.08	Osmário Reis (BRA)	30:33.16	Pablo Gardiol (URU)	31:19.16
110 metres hurdles	Jackson Quiñónez (ECU)	14.26	Adriano de Oliveira (BRA)	14.29	Jorge Chaverra (COL)	14.59
400 metres hurdles	Jorge Chaverra (COL)	51.43	Gabriel Heredia (ARG)	52.67	Xavier Caicedo (ECU)	53.23
3000 metres steeplechase	José Correa (ARG)	9:13.63	Mariano Mastromarino (ARG)	9:14.94	Jonathan Matos (BRA)	9:16.01
4 × 100 metres relay	Brazil; Humberto de Oliveira; Carlos Amorim; Anselmo da Silva; Jarbas Mascarenhas	40.97	Venezuela; Frank García; William Hernández; Jonathan Palma; Helly Ollarves	41.46	Chile; Diego Valdés; Cristian Pulido; Rodrigo Díaz; Felipe Cardemil	41.58
4 × 400 metres relay	Venezuela; Cristian Sevilla; Dany Núñez; Jonathan Palma; William Hernández	3:13.25	Brazil; Wellington Santos; Armani dos Santos; Glauco Santos; Carlos da Silva	3:14.87	Argentina; Gabriel Heredia; David Tapia; Facundo Aranguren; Jorge Maidana	3:15.21
10,000 metres track walk	Cristián Muñoz (CHI)	42:52.36	Gustavo Restrepo (COL)	43:00.81	Andrés Chocho (ECU)	44:43.08
High jump	Jessé de Lima (BRA)	2.09	Jackson Quiñónez (ECU)	2.06	Cristian Onzari (ARG)	2.03
Pole vault	Jorge Naranjo (CHI)	4.80	José Francisco Nava (CHI)	4.75	Fábio da Silva (BRA)	4.75
Long jump	Jadel Gregório (BRA)	7.36	Adriano de Oliveira (BRA)	7.30w	Eduardo Tagle (CHI)	7.20
Triple jump	Jadel Gregório (BRA)	16.18	Marcelo da Costa (BRA)	15.72	Julio Solarte (VEN)	14.99w
Shot put	Daniel Muñoz (CHI)	15.78	Mateus Monari (BRA)	15.52	Hugo Zambelli (ARG)	15.39
Discus throw	Carlos Lodato (ARG)	47.55	Héctor Hurtado (VEN)	46.60	Mateus Monari (BRA)	46.22
Hammer throw	Fernando Crovetto (ARG)	58.37	Lucas Andino (ARG)	55.56	Carlos Murúa (PER)	55.18
Javelin throw	Edwin Cuesta (VEN)	70.15	Manuel Fuenmayor (VEN)	63.17	Pablo Pietrobelli (ARG)	63.13
Decathlon	Eric Kerwitz (ARG)	6768	Ivan da Silva (BRA)	6489	Pablo Bustamente (ARG)	6473

=== Women ===
Event	Gold		Silver		Bronze	
100 metres	Digna Luz Murillo (COL)	11.71	Thatiana Ignácio (BRA)	11.73	Melisa Murillo (COL)	11.76
200 metres	Norma González (COL)	23.78	Digna Luz Murillo (COL)	24.10	Juliana Pereira (BRA)	24.73
400 metres	Norma González (COL)	54.38	Yusmelys García (VEN)	55.52	Christiane dos Santos (BRA)	55.60
800 metres	Christiane dos Santos (BRA)	2:06.68	Faustina Huamaní (PER)	2:07.04	Rosibel García (COL)	2:07.56
1500 metres	Faustina Huamaní (PER)	4:31.66	Valentina Medina (VEN)	4:33.60	Mónica Amboya (ECU)	4:35.44
3000 metres	Lucélia Peres (BRA)	9:34.96	Tatiane Sá (BRA)	9:40.40	Valentina Medina (VEN)	9:46.53
5000 metres	Lucélia Peres (BRA)	16:47.87	Rosa Apaza (BOL)	17:07.70	Gabriela Cevallos (ECU)	17:15.45
100 metres hurdles	Maíla Machado (BRA)	13.85	Sira Córdoba (COL)	14.16	Francisca Guzmán (CHI)	14.62
400 metres hurdles	Sira Córdoba (COL)	59.12	Rúbia dos Santos (BRA)	60.69	Yusmelys García (VEN)	61.91
4 × 100 metres relay	Colombia; Melisa Murillo; Digna Luz Murillo; Sira Córdoba; Norma González	45.87	Brazil; Maíla Machado; Priscila da Silva; Emanuelle Pereira; Thatiana Ignâcio	46.63	Chile; Pilar Fuenzalida; María José Echeverría; Fabiola Hecht; Daniela Pávez	47.36
4 × 400 metres relay	Colombia; Sira Córdoba; Rosibel García; Anabell Montes; Norma González	3:44.40	Brazil; Sheila Ferreira; Christiane dos Santos; Rúbia dos Santos; Perla dos Santos	3:46.60	Chile; Gloria Neira; Magdalena Sánchez; María José Echeverría; Fabiola Hecht	3:54.64
5000 metres track walk	Luisa Paltín (ECU)	24:13.86	Sara Nivicela (ECU)	24:31.24	Maria de Oliveira (BRA)	24:33.44
High jump	Jorgelina Rodríguez (ARG)	1.80	Catherine Ibargüen (COL)	1.73	Paola Hoffmann (CHI)	1.71
Pole vault	Fabiana Murer (BRA)	3.70	Joana Costa (BRA)	3.70	Elizabeth Restrepo (COL)	3.60
Long jump	Gisele de Oliveira (BRA)	6.22	Fernanda Gonçalves (BRA)	5.93	Jorgelina Rodríguez (ARG)	5.91
Triple jump	Gisele de Oliveira (BRA)	12.88	Jennifer Arveláez (VEN)	12.87	Keila Costa (BRA)	12.62
Shot put	Leomelina Blandón (COL)	14.16	Fernanda Resende (BRA)	13.82	Márcia Souza (BRA)	13.04
Discus throw	Leomelina Blandón (COL)	45.23	Fernanda Resende (BRA)	44.43	Dominique Truán (CHI)	41.05
Hammer throw	Dubraska Rodríguez (VEN)	52.23	Mariana La Nasa (ARG)	51.92	María Mercedes Melogno (URU)	46.60
Javelin throw	Roxana Fernández (ARG)	45.44	Jurema César (BRA)	43.86	Leryn Franco (PAR)	42.26
Heptathlon	Valeria Steffens (CHI)	4720	Raquel de Oliveira (BRA)	4564	Katiusca Venâncio (BRA)	4285

== Medal table (unofficial) ==
* Host nation (Chile)

Rank	Nation	Gold	Silver	Bronze	Total
1	Brazil	15	19	11	45
2	Colombia	9	4	5	18
3	Argentina	7	9	7	23
4	Venezuela	5	6	4	15
5	Chile*	4	1	8	13
6	Ecuador	2	2	4	8
7	Peru	1	1	1	3
8	Bolivia	0	1	0	1
9	Uruguay	0	0	2	2
10	Paraguay	0	0	1	1
Totals (10 entries)		43	43	43	129
