= 2003 World Championships in Athletics – Women's 200 metres =

These are the official results of the Women's 200 metres event at the 2003 IAAF World Championships in Paris, France. There were a total number of 42 participating athletes, with eight qualifying heats, four quarter-finals, two semi-finals and the final held on Thursday 28 August 2003 at 21:45h.

== Final ==
RANK	FINAL	TIME
	Anastasia Kapachinskaya (RUS)	22.38
	Torri Edwards (USA)	22.47
	Muriel Hurtis-Houairi (FRA)	22.59
4.	Zhanna Block (UKR)	22.92
5.	Beverly McDonald (JAM)	22.95
6.	Natallia Safronnikava (BLR)	22.98
7.	Anzhela Kravchenko (UKR)	23.00
—	Kelli White (USA)	DQ

== Semi-final ==
- Held on Wednesday 27 August 2003

RANK	HEAT 1	TIME
1.	Zhanna Block (UKR)	22.61
2.	Anzhela Kravchenko (UKR)	22.66
3.	Beverly McDonald (JAM)	22.92
4.	Mary Onyali-Omagbemi (NGR)	22.97
5.	Lauren Hewitt (AUS)	23.07
6.	Roxana Díaz (CUB)	23.12
7.	Vida Anim (GHA)	23.16
—	Kelli White (USA)	DQ

RANK	HEAT 2	TIME
1.	Muriel Hurtis-Houairi (FRA)	22.41
2.	Anastasiya Kapachinskaya (RUS)	22.43
3.	Torri Edwards (USA)	22.44
4.	Natallia Safronnikava (BLR)	22.76
5.	Kim Gevaert (BEL)	22.86
6.	Maryna Maydanova (UKR)	22.91
7.	Cydonie Mothersille (CAY)	23.07
8.	Mercy Nku (NGR)	23.62

== Quarter-finals ==
- Held on Tuesday 26 August 2003

RANK	HEAT 1	TIME
1.	Torri Edwards (USA)	22.66
2.	Anzhela Kravchenko (UKR)	22.81
3.	Vida Anim (GHA)	22.95
4.	Beverly McDonald (JAM)	22.96
5.	Merlene Ottey (SLO)	23.22
6.	Johanna Manninen (FIN)	23.42
7.	Anna Guzowska (POL)	23.43
—	Digna Luz Morillo (COL)	DNS

RANK	HEAT 2	TIME
1.	Anastasiya Kapachinskaya (RUS)	22.73
2.	Kim Gevaert (BEL)	22.91
3.	Maryna Maydanova (UKR)	22.93
4.	Debbie Ferguson-McKenzie (BAH)	22.98
5.	Abiodun Oyepitan (GBR)	23.42
6.	Jacqueline Poelman (NED)	23.51
—	Kelli White (USA)	DQ
—	Sharon Cripps (AUS)	DNS

RANK	HEAT 3	TIME
1.	Muriel Hurtis-Houairi (FRA)	22.70
2.	Natallia Safronnikava (BLR)	22.96
3.	Mercy Nku (NGR)	23.16
4.	Cydonie Mothersille (CAY)	23.29
5.	Svetlana Goncharenko (RUS)	23.29
6.	Allyson Felix (USA)	23.33
7.	Fabienne Féraez (BEN)	24.17
—	Aleen Bailey (JAM)	DNF

RANK	HEAT 4	TIME
1.	Zhanna Block (UKR)	22.67
2.	Mary Onyali-Omagbemi (NGR)	22.73
3.	Lauren Hewitt (AUS)	23.10
4.	Roxana Díaz (CUB)	23.21
5.	Sylviane Félix (FRA)	23.27
6.	Karin Mayr-Krifka (AUT)	23.30
7.	Geraldine Pillay (RSA)	23.39
8.	Joice Maduaka (GBR)	23.51

== Heats ==
Held on Tuesday 26 August 2003

RANK	HEAT 1	TIME
1.	Zhanna Block (UKR)	23.13
2.	Sylviane Félix (FRA)	23.29
3.	Johanna Manninen (FIN)	23.43
4.	Allyson Felix (USA)	23.46
5.	Roxana Díaz (CUB)	23.47
6.	Virgil Hodge (SKN)	24.17
7.	Yana Kolpakova (AZE)	27.74

RANK	HEAT 2	TIME
1.	Muriel Hurtis-Houairi (FRA)	22.51
2.	Vida Anim (GHA)	23.08
3.	Svetlana Goncharenko (RUS)	23.18
4.	Debbie Ferguson-McKenzie (BAH)	23.18
5.	Sharon Cripps (AUS)	23.29
6.	Digna Luz Morillo (COL)	23.48
7.	Vu Thi Huong (VIE)	24.63

RANK	HEAT 3	TIME
1.	Maryna Maydanova (UKR)	23.03
2.	Beverly McDonald (JAM)	23.11
3.	Karin Mayr-Krifka (AUT)	23.25
4.	Abiodun Oyepitan (GBR)	23.30
5.	Valma Bass (ISV)	24.16
6.	Mae Koime (PNG)	26.03
—	Kelli White (USA)	DQ

RANK	HEAT 4	TIME
1.	Anzhela Kravchenko (UKR)	22.78
2.	Torri Edwards (USA)	22.83
3.	Kim Gevaert (BEL)	22.92
4.	Joice Maduaka (GBR)	23.11
5.	Natallia Safronnikava (BLR)	23.20
6.	Fabienne Féraez (BEN)	23.85
7.	Karla Hernández (ESA)	25.97

RANK	HEAT 5	TIME
1.	Anastasiya Kapachinskaya (RUS)	22.90
2.	Aleen Bailey (JAM)	22.98
3.	Mercy Nku (NGR)	23.17
4.	Anna Guzowska (POL)	23.39
5.	Geraldine Pillay (RSA)	23.47
6.	Lineo Shoai (LES)	25.63
—	Susanthika Jayasinghe (SRI)	DNS

RANK	HEAT 6	TIME
1.	Mary Onyali-Omagbemi (NGR)	22.80
2.	Cydonie Mothersille (CAY)	22.84
3.	Lauren Hewitt (AUS)	23.01
4.	Jacqueline Poelman (NED)	23.22
5.	Merlene Ottey (SLO)	23.24
6.	Lucia Ivanová (SVK)	24.12
7.	Kerina Hughes (AIA)	27.16

== See also ==
- Athletics at the 2003 Pan American Games - Women's 200 metres
