= Athletics at the 2003 Pan American Games – Women's 4 × 100 metres relay =

Women's 4 × 100 metres relay at the Pan American Games

The women's 4 × 100 metres relay event at the 2003 Pan American Games was held on August 9.

== Results ==
Rank	Nation	Athletes	Time	Notes
1st place, gold medalist(s)	United States	Angela Williams, Consuella Moore, Angela Daigle, Lauryn Williams	43.06	
2nd place, silver medalist(s)	Cuba	Dainelky Pérez, Roxana Díaz, Virgen Benavides, Misleidys Lazo	43.40	
3rd place, bronze medalist(s)	Jamaica	Lacena Golding-Clarke, Judyth Kitson, Shellene Williams, Danielle Browning	43.71	
4	Trinidad and Tobago	Keenan Gibson, Fana Ashby, Wanda Hutson, Kelly-Ann Baptiste	43.97	NR
5	Colombia	Melisa Murillo, Digna Luz Murillo, Patricia Rodríguez, Norma González	45.13	
6	Dominican Republic	Nelsy Delgado, María Carrión, Elizabeth Balbuena, Marleni Mejía	45.76	NR
	Bahamas		DNS	
