= Athletics at the 2003 Pan American Games – Women's 200 metres =

Women's 200 metres at the Pan American Games

The final of the Women's 200 metres event at the 2003 Pan American Games took place on Friday August 8, 2003, with the heats staged a day earlier. Silver medalist Cydonie Mothersille won the only medal for the Cayman Islands at the 2003 Pan American Games.

== Medalists ==
Gold	Roxana Díaz; Cuba
Silver	Cydonie Mothersille; Cayman Islands
Bronze	Allyson Felix; United States

== Records ==
World Record	Florence Griffith-Joyner (USA)	21.34 s	September 29, 1988	Seoul, South Korea
Pan Am Record	Evelyn Ashford (USA)	22.45 s	July 9, 1979	San Juan, Puerto Rico

== Results ==
Rank	Athlete	Heats		Final
Rank	Athlete	Time	Rank	Time
1	Roxana Díaz (CUB)	22.78	1	22.69
2	Cydonie Mothersille (CAY)	22.89	2	22.86
3	Allyson Felix (USA)	22.92	3	22.93
4	Digna Luz Murillo (COL)	23.36	7	23.26
5	Crystal Cox (USA)	23.30	5	23.36
6	Danielle Browning (JAM)	23.21	4	23.46
7	Norma González (COL)	23.34	6	23.47
8	Judyth Kitson (JAM)	23.83	8	23.80
9	Shandria Brown (BAH)	23.83	9	
10	Virgil Hodge (SKN)	23.85	10	
11	Liliana Allen (MEX)	23.90	11	
12	Fana Ashby (TRI)	23.97	12	
13	Valma Bass (ISV)	24.29	13	
14	Keenan Gibson (TRI)	24.45	14	
15	Danielle St Leger (HAI)	26.55	15	

== See also ==
- 2003 World Championships in Athletics – Women's 200 metres
- Athletics at the 2004 Summer Olympics – Women's 200 metres
