= 2003 South American Championships in Athletics – Results =

These are the official results of the 2003 South American Championships in Athletics which took place June 20–22, 2003 in Barquisimeto, Venezuela.

== Men's results ==
=== 100 meters ===
Heats
Wind:
Heat 1: +0.5 m/s, Heat 2: -1.8 m/s

Rank	Heat	Name	Nationality	Time	Notes
1	2	Jarbas Mascarenhas	Brazil	10.41	Q
2	1	Édson Ribeiro	Brazil	10.52	Q
3	1	Heber Viera	Uruguay	10.56	Q
3	2	John Córdoba	Colombia	10.56	Q
5	1	Pablo Colville	Chile	10.63	Q
6	1	Jimmy Pino	Colombia	10.66	q
7	2	Juan Morillo	Venezuela	10.69	Q
8	2	Iván Altamirano	Argentina	10.76	q
9	1	Matías Usandivaras	Argentina	10.77	
10	1	Omar Cortes	Venezuela	10.89	
10	1	Luis Morán	Ecuador	10.89	
12	2	Andrés Gallegos	Ecuador	10.96	
13	2	Guillermo Mayer	Chile	11.16	

Final
Wind:
+1.2 m/s

Rank	Name	Nationality	Time	Notes
1st place, gold medalist(s)	Édson Ribeiro	Brazil	10.30	
2nd place, silver medalist(s)	Heber Viera	Uruguay	10.33	
3rd place, bronze medalist(s)	Jarbas Mascarenhas	Brazil	10.36	
4	John Córdoba	Colombia	10.52	
5	Pablo Colville	Chile	10.52	
6	Juan Morillo	Venezuela	10.54	
7	Jimmy Pino	Colombia	10.61	
8	Iván Altamirano	Argentina	10.68	

=== 200 meters ===
Heats
Wind:
Heat 1: +2.8 m/s, Heat 2: +0.8 m/s

Rank	Heat	Name	Nationality	Time	Notes
1	1	Claudinei da Silva	Brazil	20.70	Q
2	1	Ricardo Roach	Chile	20.74	Q
3	2	Heber Viera	Uruguay	20.81	Q
4	2	Jorge Célio Sena	Brazil	20.81	Q
5	2	Matías Usandivaras	Argentina	21.23	Q
6	2	José Carabalí	Venezuela	21.26	q
7	2	Jimmy Pino	Colombia	21.36	q
8	1	Eudomar Pirela	Venezuela	21.40	Q
9	1	Iván Altamirano	Argentina	21.58	
10	2	Guillermo Mayer	Chile	21.77	
11	2	Andrés Gallegos	Ecuador	22.49	

Final
Wind:
-0.9 m/s

Rank	Name	Nationality	Time	Notes
1st place, gold medalist(s)	Heber Viera	Uruguay	20.60	
2nd place, silver medalist(s)	Claudinei da Silva	Brazil	20.63	
3rd place, bronze medalist(s)	Jorge Célio Sena	Brazil	20.71	
4	José Carabalí	Venezuela	21.26	
5	Ricardo Roach	Chile	21.29	
6	Eudomar Pirela	Venezuela	21.33	
7	Jimmy Pino	Colombia	21.38	
8	Matías Usandivaras	Argentina	21.59	

=== 400 meters ===
Heats

Rank	Heat	Name	Nationality	Time	Notes
1	2	Jonathan Palma	Venezuela	46.59	Q
2	1	William José Hernández	Venezuela	46.66	Q
3	1	Mauricio Mery	Chile	46.74	Q
4	2	Luís Ambrosio	Brazil	46.76	Q
5	1	Anderson Jorge dos Santos	Brazil	46.78	Q
6	2	Andrés Silva	Uruguay	47.06	Q
7	2	Julio Rojas	Colombia	47.27	q
8	1	Francisco Aguirre	Ecuador	47.55	q
9	2	Barión Heredia	Argentina	47.85	
10	2	Cristián Gutiérrez	Ecuador	48.41	
11	1	Gélver Espinoza	Colombia	48.47	

Final

Rank	Name	Nationality	Time	Notes
1st place, gold medalist(s)	William José Hernández	Venezuela	45.81	
2nd place, silver medalist(s)	Anderson Jorge dos Santos	Brazil	46.07	
3rd place, bronze medalist(s)	Mauricio Mery	Chile	46.20	
4	Andrés Silva	Uruguay	46.23	
5	Jonathan Palma	Venezuela	46.84	
6	Luís Ambrosio	Brazil	47.14	
7	Julio Rojas	Colombia	47.64	
8	Francisco Aguirre	Ecuador	47.67	

=== 800 meters ===
Heats

Rank	Heat	Name	Nationality	Time	Notes
1	1	Osmar dos Santos	Brazil	1:49.08	Q
2	2	Cristián Matute	Ecuador	1:49.27	Q
3	1	Bayron Piedra	Ecuador	1:49.73	Q
4	1	Simoncito Silvera	Venezuela	1:49.79	Q
5	2	Fabiano Peçanha	Brazil	1:50.17	Q
6	2	José Bermúdez	Colombia	1:50.38	Q
7	2	Sebastián González	Argentina	1:50.45	q
8	1	Ronny Bravo	Chile	1:50.71	q
9	1	John Chávez	Colombia	1:50.80	
10	1	Javier Carriqueo	Argentina	1:51.98	
11	1	Fadrique Iglesias	Bolivia	1:52.01	
12	2	José Manuel González	Venezuela	1:52.55	
13	2	Tai Payne	Guyana	1:56.31	

Final

Rank	Name	Nationality	Time	Notes
1st place, gold medalist(s)	Fabiano Peçanha	Brazil	1:46.32	
2nd place, silver medalist(s)	Osmar dos Santos	Brazil	1:46.92	
3rd place, bronze medalist(s)	Simoncito Silvera	Venezuela	1:48.31	
4	Cristián Matute	Ecuador	1:48.88	
5	Bayron Piedra	Ecuador	1:49.25	
6	José Bermúdez	Colombia	1:49.81	
7	Ronny Bravo	Chile	1:55.18	
8	Sebastián González	Argentina	1:57.61	

=== 1500 meters ===
Rank	Name	Nationality	Time	Notes
1st place, gold medalist(s)	Fabiano Peçanha	Brazil	3:39.74	
2nd place, silver medalist(s)	Miguel Ángel García	Venezuela	3:41.01	
3rd place, bronze medalist(s)	Javier Carriqueo	Argentina	3:42.65	
4	Bayron Piedra	Ecuador	3:43.86	
5	Sebastián González	Argentina	3:46.36	
6	Mauricio Ladino	Colombia	3:46.92	
7	Clayton Aguiar	Brazil	3:52.04	
8	Fadrique Iglesias	Bolivia	3:53.26	
9	Roberto García	Chile	3:55.71	
10	José Manuel González	Venezuela	4:04.20	

=== 5000 meters ===
Rank	Name	Nationality	Time	Notes
1st place, gold medalist(s)	Marílson Gomes dos Santos	Brazil	13:52.15	
2nd place, silver medalist(s)	William Naranjo	Colombia	14:03.41	
3rd place, bronze medalist(s)	Luis Fonseca	Venezuela	14:17.44	
4	Edgar Chancusia	Ecuador	14:17.90	
5	Juan Suárez	Argentina	14:29.90	
6	Jonathan Monje	Chile	14:35.17	
7	Jacinto López	Colombia	14:36.66	
8	Pedro Pérez	Venezuela	14:37.16	
9	Cristián Rosales	Uruguay	15:06.89	
10	Ernesto Zamora	Uruguay	15:33.15	

=== 10,000 meters ===
Rank	Name	Nationality	Time	Notes
1st place, gold medalist(s)	William Naranjo	Colombia	29:37.38	
2nd place, silver medalist(s)	Luiz Paula	Brazil	29:49.11	
3rd place, bronze medalist(s)	Alejandro Semprum	Venezuela	30:06.03	
4	Jonathan Monje	Chile	30:23.95	
5	Jacinto López	Colombia	30:30.37	
6	Larry Sánchez	Venezuela	30:36.30	
7	Washington Veleda	Uruguay	33:08.26	
	Cristián Rosales	Uruguay	DNF	
	Juan Suárez	Argentina	DNF	

=== 110 meters hurdles ===
Wind: +1.5 m/s

Rank	Name	Nationality	Time	Notes
1st place, gold medalist(s)	Redelén dos Santos	Brazil	13.45	
2nd place, silver medalist(s)	Jackson Quinónez	Ecuador	13.59	
3rd place, bronze medalist(s)	Matheus Facho Inocencio	Brazil	13.69	
4	Paulo Villar	Colombia	14.12	
5	Reina Merlean	Venezuela	14.39	
6	Alejandro Briceno	Venezuela	14.59	
7	Francisco Schilling	Chile	14.69	
8	Leandro Peyrano	Argentina	15.19	

=== 400 meters hurdles ===
Heats

Rank	Heat	Name	Nationality	Time	Notes
1	1	Eronilde de Araújo	Brazil	50.02	Q
2	1	Bayano Kamani	Panama	50.60	Q
3	2	Cleverson da Silva	Brazil	51.52	Q
4	2	Luis Montenegro	Chile	51.92	Q
5	2	Alexander Mena	Colombia	52.36	Q
6	2	José Gregorio Turbay	Venezuela	52.42	q
7	1	Carlos Zbinden	Chile	52.59	Q
8	1	José Ignacio Pignataro	Argentina	53.63	q
9	1	Ángel Rodríguez	Venezuela	54.84	
10	2	Jonathan Gibson	Panama	55.24	

Final

Rank	Name	Nationality	Time	Notes
1st place, gold medalist(s)	Bayano Kamani	Panama	50.10	
2nd place, silver medalist(s)	Cleverson da Silva	Brazil	50.35	
3rd place, bronze medalist(s)	Eronilde de Araújo	Brazil	50.81	
4	Luis Montenegro	Chile	51.22	
5	Carlos Zbinden	Chile	52.25	
6	Alexander Mena	Colombia	52.65	
7	José Ignacio Pignataro	Argentina	52.66	
8	José Gregorio Turbay	Venezuela	53.55	

=== 3000 meters steeplechase ===
Rank	Name	Nationality	Time	Notes
1st place, gold medalist(s)	Néstor Nieves	Venezuela	8:46.41	
2nd place, silver medalist(s)	Celso Ficagna	Brazil	8:51.73	
3rd place, bronze medalist(s)	Richard Arias	Ecuador	8:52.66	
4	Roberto García	Chile	9:15.41	
5	Mariano Mastromarino	Argentina	9:16.79	
6	Martin Marana	Uruguay	9:53.92	
	Fernando Alex Fernandes	Brazil	DNF	

=== 4 x 100 meters relay ===
Rank	Nation	Competitors	Time	Notes
1st place, gold medalist(s)	Brazil	Jarbas Mascarenhas, Édson Ribeiro, Cláudio Roberto Souza, Claudinei da Silva	38.96	
2nd place, silver medalist(s)	Venezuela	Juan Morillo, Omar Cortes, José Carabalí, Hely Ollarves	39.85	
3rd place, bronze medalist(s)	Chile	Pablo Colville, Ricardo Roach, Guillermo Mayer, Mauricio Mery	40.04	
4	Ecuador	Luis Morán, Andrés Gallegos, Cristián Gutiérrez, Jackson Quinónez	40.61	
5	Argentina	Iván Altamirano, Sebastián Lasquera, Barion Heredia, Matías Usandivaras	40.68	
6	Colombia	Wilmer Murillo, Jimmy Pino, Paulo Villar, Dainnler Griego	40.73	

=== 4 x 400 meters relay ===
Rank	Nation	Competitors	Time	Notes
1st place, gold medalist(s)	Brazil	Luís Ambrosio, Eronilde de Araújo, Flavio Godoy, Anderson Jorge dos Santos	3:05.28	
2nd place, silver medalist(s)	Venezuela	Jonathan Palma, Luis Luna, Dany Nunez, William José Hernández	3:09.26	
3rd place, bronze medalist(s)	Colombia	John Chávez, Gélver Espinoza, José Bermúdez, Julio Rojas	3:09.48	
4	Argentina	José Ignacio Pignataro, Sebastián Lasquera, Matías Usandivaras, Barión Heredia	3:09.78	
5	Ecuador	Cristián Gutiérrez, Cristián Matute, Luis Morán, Francisco Aguirre	3:14.22	
6	Chile	Mauricio Mery, Carlos Zbinden, Luis Montenegro, Guillermo Mayer	3:16.55	

=== 20,000 meters walk ===
Rank	Name	Nationality	Time	Notes
1st place, gold medalist(s)	Sérgio Galdino	Brazil	1:25:54.12	
2nd place, silver medalist(s)	Fredy Hernández	Colombia	1:25:59.91	
3rd place, bronze medalist(s)	Cristian Muñoz	Chile	1:31:16.10	
4	Rolando Saquipay	Ecuador	1:32:14.04	
5	Ronald Huayta	Bolivia	1:32:20.06	
6	Edwin Centeno	Peru	1:32:22.01	
7	Luis Villagra	Chile	1:38:16.30	
8	Fausto Quinde	Ecuador	1:38:30.71	
	Luis Fernando López	Colombia	DNF	
	Raúl Moreno	Venezuela	DQ	
	José Alessandro Bagio	Brazil	DQ	

=== High jump ===
Rank	Name	Nationality	1.80	2.00	2.05	2.10	2.13	2.16	2.19	2.22	2.25	Result	Notes
1st place, gold medalist(s)	Fabrízio Romero	Brazil	–	–	–	–	–	o	–	xo	xxx	2.22	
2nd place, silver medalist(s)	Jessé de Lima	Brazil	–	–	–	–	–	xo	–	xxo	xxx	2.22	
3rd place, bronze medalist(s)	Alfredo Deza	Peru	–	–	–	xo	–	xxo	xxx			2.16	
4	Felipe Apablaza	Chile	–	xo	o	o	xxo	xxx				2.13	
5	Erasmo Jara	Argentina	–	–	xo	o	xxx					2.10	
6	Cristián Lyon	Chile	xo									1.80	

=== Pole vault ===
Rank	Name	Nationality	4.55	4.85	5.00	5.10	5.20	5.30	Result	Notes
1st place, gold medalist(s)	Ricardo Diez	Venezuela	–	–	o	o	o	xxx	5.20	
2nd place, silver medalist(s)	Javier Benítez	Argentina	–	–	xo	o	o	xxx	5.20	
3rd place, bronze medalist(s)	Gustavo Rehder	Brazil	–	–	o	o	xxx		5.10	
4	Marcelo Terra	Argentina	–	xo	o	o	xxx		5.10	
5	Fábio Gomes da Silva	Brazil	–	–	xo	xxo	xxx		5.10	
6	Jorge Naranjo	Chile	–	xo	o	xxx			5.00	
7	Francisco León	Peru	–	o	xxo	xxx			5.00	
8	José Francisco Nava	Chile	xo	xo	xxx				4.85	

=== Long jump ===
Rank	Name	Nationality	#1	#2	#3	#4	#5	#6	Result	Notes
1st place, gold medalist(s)	Víctor Castillo	Venezuela	7.19	7.60	7.68	?	7.78	?	7.78	
2nd place, silver medalist(s)	Sérgio dos Santos	Brazil	6.94	7.50	x	7.34	7.65	7.49	7.65	
3rd place, bronze medalist(s)	Irving Saladino	Panama	7.13	7.46	7.27	7.42	7.46	x	7.46	
4	Thiago Dias	Brazil	7.30	x	7.09	x	7.11	7.28	7.30	
5	Cristián Lyon	Chile	7.03	6.98	7.30	x	7.28	x	7.30	
6	Dainnler Griego	Colombia	7.15	7.05	7.13	7.10	x	7.18	7.18	
7	Esteban Copland	Venezuela	x	7.14	x	7.16	7.07	x	7.16	
8	Cristián Antivilo	Chile	6.77	6.72	7.08	x	x	6.63	7.08	
9	Louis Tristán	Peru	x	6.78	x				6.78	
10	Clyde Gibson	Guyana	6.58	x	6.72				6.72	

=== Triple jump ===
Rank	Name	Nationality	#1	#2	#3	#4	#5	#6	Result	Notes
1st place, gold medalist(s)	Jadel Gregório	Brazil	16.64	16.69	15.81	16.71	16.76	?	16.76	
2nd place, silver medalist(s)	Anísio Silva	Brazil	15.61	x	16.22	x	x	x	16.22	
3rd place, bronze medalist(s)	Johnny Rodríguez	Venezuela	x	15.82	15.59	15.54	x	16.12	16.12	
4	Leisner Aragón	Colombia	15.22	15.47	15.49	15.81	15.67	16.04	16.04	
5	Alvin Rentería	Colombia	15.53	15.55	16.02	15.44	15.39	15.82	16.02	
6	Felipe Apablaza	Chile	15.45	16.02	14.50w	x	x	x	16.02	
7	José Joaquin Reyes	Venezuela	15.03	x	15.42	15.47	15.73	15.54	15.73	
8	Freddy Nieves	Ecuador	15.12	15.61	15.69w	15.43	15.44	15.42	15.69w	
9	Mariano Sala	Argentina	15.35	15.02	x				15.35	

=== Shot put ===
Rank	Name	Nationality	#1	#2	#3	#4	#5	#6	Result	Notes
1st place, gold medalist(s)	Marco Antonio Verni	Chile	17.89	19.96	19.59	x	20.23	x	20.23	
2nd place, silver medalist(s)	Yojer Medina	Venezuela	19.29	x	x	18.60	?	?	19.29	
3rd place, bronze medalist(s)	Jhonny Rodríguez	Colombia	17.85	x	17.84	18.22	17.84	17.84	18.22	
4	Daniel Freire	Brazil	16.93	16.90	16.69	16.90	17.06	17.01	17.06	
5	Mateus Monari	Brazil	15.54	15.22	16.57	16.34	14.90	16.56	16.57	
6	Daniel Munos	Chile	15.74	x	16.46	x	x	x	16.46	
7	Adrián Marzo	Argentina	14.50	14.85	14.83	?	?	?	14.85	
	Juan Tello	Peru	x						NM	

=== Discus throw ===
Rank	Name	Nationality	#1	#2	#3	#4	#5	#6	Result	Notes
1st place, gold medalist(s)	Marcelo Pugliese	Argentina	53.27	56.26	x	56.04	57.44	56.86	57.44	
2nd place, silver medalist(s)	Jorge Balliengo	Argentina	51.52	53.30	55.22	x	52.92	52.40	55.22	
3rd place, bronze medalist(s)	Héctor Hurtado	Venezuela	x	x	51.72	x	54.61	x	54.61	
4	Jesús Parejo	Venezuela	51.97	51.38	50.90	50.03	50.85	53.90	53.90	
5	Joao dos Santos	Brazil	53.40	x	50.51	51.66	51.41	51.59	53.40	
6	Juan Tello	Peru	x	51.40	50.68	x	x	50.30	51.40	
7	Mateus Monari	Brazil	50.89	46.81	48.17	47.16	47.93	48.53	50.89	

=== Hammer throw ===
Rank	Name	Nationality	#1	#2	#3	#4	#5	#6	Result	Notes
1st place, gold medalist(s)	Juan Ignacio Cerra	Argentina	71.70	x	x	x	x	73.31	73.31	
2nd place, silver medalist(s)	Adrián Marzo	Argentina	x	64.70	67.25	x	x	x	67.25	
3rd place, bronze medalist(s)	Aldo Bello	Venezuela	62.95	63.99	65.24	64.76	65.27	x	65.27	
4	Patricio Palma	Chile	63.50	x	62.23	x	x	64.88	64.88	
5	Mário Leme	Brazil	63.30	62.57	62.25	61.43	x	59.98	63.30	
6	José Manuel Llano	Chile	x	56.33	60.52	61.13	62.59	62.71	62.71	
7	Eduardo Acuna	Peru	61.90	62.22	61.99	61.22	61.80	60.44	62.22	
8	Pedro Munoz	Venezuela	56.05	57.29	56.32	x	x	x	57.29	
9	Marcos dos Santos	Brazil	56.68	x	x				56.68	

=== Javelin throw ===
Rank	Name	Nationality	#1	#2	#3	#4	#5	#6	Result	Notes
1st place, gold medalist(s)	Luiz Fernando da Silva	Brazil	75.70	79.50	x	x	77.69	77.35	79.50	
2nd place, silver medalist(s)	Noraldo Palacios	Colombia	76.81	72.67	x	70.84	70.54	68.27	76.81	
3rd place, bronze medalist(s)	Nery Kennedy	Paraguay	x	71.11	75.53	x	71.28	72.67	75.53	
4	Manuel Fuenmayor	Venezuela	75.42	x	x	71.69	x	69.67	75.42	
5	Ronald Noguera	Venezuela	73.69	x	72.39	71.76	65.88	64.23	73.69	
6	Diego Moraga	Chile	x	64.35	65.37	62.02	72.88	x	72.88	
7	Volmir Zili	Brazil	63.42	x	66.21	68.95	72.09	x	72.09	
8	Pablo Pietrobelli	Argentina	65.11	61.29	66.97	x	x	64.01	66.97	

=== Decathlon ===
The highest mark recorded in each event is highlighted in yellow

Rank	Athlete	Nationality	100m	LJ	SP	HJ	400m	110m H	DT	PV	JT	1500m	Points	Notes
1st place, gold medalist(s)	Édson Bindilatti	Brazil	11.33	7.08	11.36	1.93	47.96	14.86	40.53	4.50	41.16	4:44.49	7254	
2nd place, silver medalist(s)	Juan Jaramillo	Venezuela	11.54	6.60	11.80	1.90	51.49	15.51	36.86	3.50	57.22	4:40.67	6763	
3rd place, bronze medalist(s)	Enrique Aguirre	Argentina	11.15	6.54	13.52	2.02	50.11	15.36	39.32	NM	52.11	4:46.23	6585	
4	Eric Kerwitz	Argentina	11.14	7.26	12.44	1.96	50.88	15.43	NM	3.50	54.68	4:53.58	6415	
5	Robinson Urrutia	Colombia	10.91	5.88	12.55	1.69	50.24	16.78	34.09	3.40	44.01	5:30.67	5967	

== Women's results ==
=== 100 meters ===
Heats
Wind:
Heat 1: +0.5 m/s, Heat 2: 0.0 m/s

Rank	Heat	Name	Nationality	Time	Notes
1	2	Lucimar de Moura	Brazil	11.55	Q
2	2	Digna Luz Murillo	Colombia	11.62	Q
3	1	Melisa Murillo	Colombia	11.66	Q
4	1	Vanesa Wohlgemuth	Argentina	11.74	Q
5	2	Wilmary Álvarez	Venezuela	11.80	Q
6	1	Renata Vilela Sampaio	Brazil	11.85	Q
7	1	Fanny Sevilla	Venezuela	11.88	q
8	2	Daniela Pávez	Chile	11.89	q
9	2	Ana Caicedo	Ecuador	11.94	
10	1	María Izabel Coloma	Chile	11.99	
11	2	Daniela Lebreo	Argentina	12.42	
12	1	Jazmín Caicedo	Ecuador	12.49	

Final
Wind:
+0.2 m/s

Rank	Name	Nationality	Time	Notes
1st place, gold medalist(s)	Digna Luz Murillo	Colombia	11.35	
2nd place, silver medalist(s)	Lucimar de Moura	Brazil	11.43	
3rd place, bronze medalist(s)	Wilmary Álvarez	Venezuela	11.59	
4	Renata Vilela Sampaio	Brazil	11.67	
5	Melisa Murillo	Colombia	11.71	
6	Vanesa Wohlgemuth	Argentina	11.82	
7	Daniela Pávez	Chile	11.88	
8	Fanny Sevilla	Venezuela	11.94	

=== 200 meters ===
Heats
Wind:
Heat 1: +1.7 m/s, Heat 2: +3.1 m/s

Rank	Heat	Name	Nationality	Time	Notes
1	1	Lucimar de Moura	Brazil	23.26	Q
2	2	Digna Luz Murillo	Colombia	23.30	Q
3	2	Rosemar Coelho Neto	Brazil	23.54	Q
4	2	Wilmary Álvarez	Venezuela	23.57	Q
5	1	Melisa Murillo	Colombia	23.92	Q
6	1	Eliana Pacheco	Venezuela	24.08	Q
7	2	María José Echeverría	Chile	24.11	q
8	1	María Izabel Coloma	Chile	24.32	q
9	2	Daniela Lebreo	Argentina	24.49	
10	1	Jessica Perea	Ecuador	24.91	
11	2	Jazmín Caicedo	Ecuador	25.36	

Final
Wind:
0.0 m/s

Rank	Name	Nationality	Time	Notes
1st place, gold medalist(s)	Digna Luz Murillo	Colombia	23.13	
2nd place, silver medalist(s)	Lucimar de Moura	Brazil	23.34	
3rd place, bronze medalist(s)	Wilmary Álvarez	Venezuela	23.40	
4	Rosemar Coelho Neto	Brazil	23.50	
5	Eliana Pacheco	Venezuela	24.04	
6	María Izabel Coloma	Chile	24.33	
7	María José Echeverría	Chile	24.42	
8	Melisa Murillo	Colombia	24.51	

=== 400 meters ===
Rank	Name	Nationality	Time	Notes
1st place, gold medalist(s)	Geisa Coutinho	Brazil	51.81	
2nd place, silver medalist(s)	Eliana Pacheco	Venezuela	52.43	
3rd place, bronze medalist(s)	Josiane Tito	Brazil	52.68	
4	Ángela Alfonso	Venezuela	53.48	
5	Mirtha Brock	Colombia	54.30	
6	Andrea Rossotti	Argentina	54.59	
7	Lucy Jaramillo	Ecuador	55.43	
8	Grace Arias	Ecuador	57.27	

=== 800 meters ===
Rank	Name	Nationality	Time	Notes
1st place, gold medalist(s)	Luciana Mendes	Brazil	2:02.06	
2nd place, silver medalist(s)	Christiane dos Santos	Brazil	2:02.50	
3rd place, bronze medalist(s)	Rosibel García	Colombia	2:02.84	
4	Niusha Mancilla	Bolivia	2:07.63	
5	Andrea Rossotti	Argentina	2:07.90	
6	Jenny Mejías	Venezuela	2:08.36	
7	Janeth Rodallega	Colombia	2:08.91	
8	Oilyn Granados	Venezuela	2:11.40	
9	Clara Morales	Chile	2:20.59	

=== 1500 meters ===
Rank	Name	Nationality	Time	Notes
1st place, gold medalist(s)	Juliana de Azevedo	Brazil	4:17.54	
2nd place, silver medalist(s)	Niusha Mancilla	Bolivia	4:21.54	
3rd place, bronze medalist(s)	Ana Cláudia Coimbra	Brazil	4:21.75	
4	Valentina Medina	Venezuela	4:32.97	
5	Clara Morales	Chile	4:33.95	
6	Janeth Rodallega	Colombia	4:34.43	

=== 5000 meters ===
Rank	Name	Nationality	Time	Notes
1st place, gold medalist(s)	Maria Rodrigues	Brazil	16:11.70	
2nd place, silver medalist(s)	Érika Olivera	Chile	16:23.97	
3rd place, bronze medalist(s)	Lucélia Peres	Brazil	16:36.31	
4	Luz Silva	Chile	16:53.02	
5	Silvia Paredes	Ecuador	16:58.36	
6	Mónica Amboya	Ecuador	17:15.81	
7	Norelys Lugo	Venezuela	17:26.78	

=== 10,000 meters ===
Rank	Name	Nationality	Time	Notes
1st place, gold medalist(s)	Ednalva da Silva	Brazil	34:13.50	
2nd place, silver medalist(s)	Érika Olivera	Chile	34:43.02	
3rd place, bronze medalist(s)	Luz Silva	Chile	35:01.73	
4	Lidia Karwowski	Brazil	35:24.20	
5	Norelys Lugo	Venezuela	35:50.34	
6	Raquel Aceituno	Peru	35:52.16	

=== 100 meters hurdles ===
Wind: -1.5 m/s

Rank	Name	Nationality	Time	Notes
1st place, gold medalist(s)	Gilvaneide de Oliveira	Brazil	13.44	
2nd place, silver medalist(s)	Maíla Machado	Brazil	13.63	
3rd place, bronze medalist(s)	Princesa Oliveros	Colombia	13.77	
4	Francisca Guzmán	Chile	13.94	
5	Sandrine Legenort	Venezuela	14.09	
6	Brigitte Merlano	Colombia	14.38	
7	Patricia Riesco	Peru	14.48	
8	Ada Hernández	Venezuela	14.87	

=== 400 meters hurdles ===
Rank	Name	Nationality	Time	Notes
1st place, gold medalist(s)	Lucimar Teodoro	Brazil	56.86	
2nd place, silver medalist(s)	Raquel da Costa	Brazil	57.51	
3rd place, bronze medalist(s)	Princesa Oliveros	Colombia	57.53	
4	Yusmely García	Venezuela	58.03	
5	Velveth Moreno	Panama	58.90	
6	Lucy Jaramillo	Ecuador	1:00.98	
7	Helen Delgado	Venezuela	1:02.87	
8	Grace Arias	Ecuador	1:04.36	

=== 3000 meters steeplechase ===
Rank	Name	Nationality	Time	Notes
1st place, gold medalist(s)	Mónica Amboya	Ecuador	10:25.90	
2nd place, silver medalist(s)	Silvia Paredes	Ecuador	10:38.32	
3rd place, bronze medalist(s)	Patrícia Lobo	Brazil	10:55.88	
4	Anahi Soto	Chile	11:09.71	
5	María Peralta	Argentina	11:16.83	

=== 4 x 100 meters relay ===
Rank	Nation	Competitors	Time	Notes
1st place, gold medalist(s)	Brazil	Renata Vilela Sampaio, Lucimar de Moura, Rosemar Coelho Neto, Thatiana Regina Ignâcio	44.16	
2nd place, silver medalist(s)	Colombia	Mirtha Brock, Luz Celia Ararat, Melisa Murillo, Digna Luz Murillo	44.67	
3rd place, bronze medalist(s)	Chile	Daniela Riderelli, María José Echeverría, Daniela Pávez, María Izabel Coloma	45.37	
4	Argentina	Verónica Pronzati, Andrea Rossotti, Daniela Lebreo, Vanesa Wohlgemuth	46.02	
5	Venezuela	Yaudelis Barboza, Wilmary Álvarez, Fanny Sevilla, Jackeline Carabalí	46.48	
6	Ecuador	Ana Caicedo, Jazmín Caicedo, Jessica Perea, Grace Arias	47.30	

=== 4 x 400 meters relay ===
Rank	Nation	Competitors	Time	Notes
1st place, gold medalist(s)	Brazil	Maria Laura Almirao, Josiane Tito, Lucimar Teodoro, Geisa Coutinho	3:28.64	
2nd place, silver medalist(s)	Venezuela	Wilmary Álvarez, Ángela Alfonso, Yusmely García, Eliana Pacheco	3:34.30	
3rd place, bronze medalist(s)	Colombia	Luz Celia Ararat, Princesa Oliveros, Mirtha Brock, Rosibel García	3:41.05	
4	Argentina	Vanesa Wohlgemuth, Verónica Pronzati, Daniela Lebreo, Andrea Rossotti	3:44.16	
5	Chile	Daniela Riderelli, María José Echeverría, Valeria Steffens, Macarena Reyes	3:45.72	
6	Ecuador	Jazmín Caicedo, Grace Arias, Jessica Perea, Lucy Jaramillo	3:53.23	

=== 20,000 meters walk ===
Rank	Name	Nationality	Time	Notes
1st place, gold medalist(s)	Sandra Zapata	Colombia	1:40:52.59	
2nd place, silver medalist(s)	Morelba Useche	Venezuela	1:48:24.85	
3rd place, bronze medalist(s)	Marcela Pacheco	Chile	1:49:50.07	
4	Josette Sepúlveda	Chile	1:54:24.41	
5	Gianetti Bonfim	Brazil	1:59:47.60	
	Cisiane Lopes	Brazil	DNF	

=== High jump ===
Rank	Name	Nationality	1.65	1.70	1.73	1.76	1.79	1.82	1.85	Result	Notes
1st place, gold medalist(s)	Luciane Dambacher	Brazil	–	–	o	–	xxo	o	xxx	1.82	
2nd place, silver medalist(s)	Yetzálida Pérez	Venezuela	o	o	xxo	o	o	o	xxx	1.82	
3rd place, bronze medalist(s)	Claudia Casals	Argentina	o	xo	o	o	o	xxx		1.79	
4	Caterine Ibargüen	Colombia	–	o	xo	xxo	o	xxx		1.79	
5	Jhoris Luquez	Venezuela	o	o	o	xo	xxx			1.76	
6	Mônica de Freitas	Brazil	o	o	o	xxx				1.73	

=== Pole vault ===
Rank	Name	Nationality	3.30	3.45	3.60	3.70	3.80	3.90	4.00	4.05	4.10	4.20	4.25	Result	Notes
1st place, gold medalist(s)	Alejandra García	Argentina	–	–	–	–	–	–	o	–	xo	xo	xxx	4.20	
2nd place, silver medalist(s)	Carolina Torres	Chile	–	–	–	–	o	o	xo	–	o	xo	xxx	4.20	
3rd place, bronze medalist(s)	Milena Agudelo	Colombia	–	–	–	o	xxo	xxo	o	xxx				4.00	
4	Déborah Gyurcsek	Uruguay	–	o	o	o	xo	o	xxx					3.90	
5	Pamela Barnert	Chile	–	o	xo	o	xxo	o	xxx					3.90	
6	Alina Alló	Argentina	–	–	o	xo	o	xxx						3.80	
6	Karla Rosa da Silva	Brazil	–	–	–	–	xxo	xxx						3.80	
8	Michaela Heitkotter	Brazil	–	–	o	o	xxx							3.70	
	Aliusha Díaz	Uruguay	xxx											NM	

=== Long jump ===
Rank	Name	Nationality	#1	#2	#3	#4	#5	#6	Result	Notes
1st place, gold medalist(s)	Keila Costa	Brazil	6.22	6.21	6.30	6.29	x	6.27	6.30	
2nd place, silver medalist(s)	Caterine Ibargüen	Colombia	5.78w	x	6.04	x	5.96	x	6.04	
3rd place, bronze medalist(s)	Mónica Falcioni	Uruguay	5.65	5.74	5.83	5.79	5.74	5.94	5.94	
4	Macarena Reyes	Chile	5.56	5.80	5.77	5.66	5.57	5.82	5.82	
5	Jennifer Arveláez	Venezuela	5.37	5.66	5.53	5.57	5.60	5.78	5.78	
6	Ana Caicedo	Ecuador	5.56	5.76	x	x	x	5.61	5.76	
7	Andrea Morales	Argentina	5.35	5.04	5.53	5.22	x	5.74	5.74	
8	Michelle Vaughn	Guyana	x	5.60	5.52	5.65	x	5.46	5.65	
9	Luciana dos Santos	Brazil	x	x	5.36				5.36	
10	Verónica Davis	Venezuela	4.66	5.19	5.10				5.19	

=== Triple jump ===
Rank	Name	Nationality	#1	#2	#3	#4	#5	#6	Result	Notes
1st place, gold medalist(s)	Keila Costa	Brazil	13.62	x	13.57	13.18	12.99	?	13.62	
2nd place, silver medalist(s)	Luciana dos Santos	Brazil	13.00	13.39	x	13.04	13.21	13.42	13.42	
3rd place, bronze medalist(s)	Caterine Ibargüen	Colombia	12.51	12.87	13.07	12.79	x	x	13.07	
4	Jennifer Arveláez	Venezuela	12.41	12.61	x	12.83	12.78	12.64	12.83	
5	Mónica Falcioni	Uruguay	12.37	12.49	12.79	12.39	12.61	x	12.79	
6	Michelle Vaughn	Guyana	11.96	x	x	12.24	12.24	12.51w	12.51w	
7	Verónica Davis	Venezuela	x	12.15	11.81	11.58	12.43w	x	12.43w	
8	Macarena Reyes	Chile	11.93	12.07	12.15	12.42	12.17	?	12.42	
	Andrea Morales	Argentina	x	x	x				NM	

=== Shot put ===
Rank	Name	Nationality	#1	#2	#3	#4	#5	#6	Result	Notes
1st place, gold medalist(s)	Elisângela Adriano	Brazil	16.47	17.18	17.15	18.34	18.19	18.34	18.34	
2nd place, silver medalist(s)	Luz Dary Castro	Colombia	x	14.94	15.03	16.59	16.18	x	16.59	
3rd place, bronze medalist(s)	Marianne Berndt	Chile	15.44	15.95	15.95	16.39	16.23	16.09	16.39	
4	Andréa Maria Britto	Brazil	x	x	14.43	16.19	15.45	15.99	16.19	
5	Rosario Ramos	Venezuela	14.47	14.21	14.98	15.18	15.59	13.70	15.59	
6	Neolanis Suárez	Venezuela	13.49	13.26	x	13.81	x	x	13.81	
7	Valeria Steffens	Chile	11.46	11.48	x				11.48	

=== Discus throw ===
Rank	Name	Nationality	#1	#2	#3	#4	#5	#6	Result	Notes
1st place, gold medalist(s)	Elisângela Adriano	Brazil	58.37	x	x	x	x	x	58.37	
2nd place, silver medalist(s)	Luz Dary Castro	Colombia	51.73	x	x	x	46.94	x	51.73	
3rd place, bronze medalist(s)	María Cubillán	Venezuela	x	50.47	48.04	46.86	48.52	x	50.47	
4	Renata de Figueiredo	Brazil	44.69	x	49.72	45.88	44.59	49.76	49.76	
5	Rosario Ramos	Venezuela	46.18	48.19	46.70	42.96	46.12	48.87	48.87	
6	Marianne Berndt	Chile	39.39	47.18	x	x	45.61	x	47.18	
7	Karina Díaz	Ecuador	40.02	41.24	x	x	41.12	x	41.24	

=== Hammer throw ===
Rank	Name	Nationality	#1	#2	#3	#4	#5	#6	Result	Notes
1st place, gold medalist(s)	Katiuscia de Jesus	Brazil	56.40	60.02	56.30	61.01	x	56.40	61.01	
2nd place, silver medalist(s)	Josiane Soares	Brazil	58.27	57.96	55.37	59.65	55.66	57.41	59.65	
3rd place, bronze medalist(s)	Adriana Benaventa	Venezuela	58.34	x	x	x	x	57.45	58.34	
4	Odette Palma	Chile	56.50	58.19	58.02	56.22	x	56.99	58.19	
5	Karina Moya	Argentina	56.59	x	56.09	57.40	x	x	57.40	
6	María Eugenia Villamizar	Colombia	52.48	54.83	52.88	55.03	x	53.22	55.03	
7	Erika Melián	Argentina	x	53.07	x	52.24	53.72	x	53.72	
8	Karina Díaz	Ecuador	49.00	x	x	x	x	x	49.00	
	Yaiza Córdoba	Colombia	x	x	x				NM	

=== Javelin throw ===
Rank	Name	Nationality	#1	#2	#3	#4	#5	#6	Result	Notes
1st place, gold medalist(s)	Sabina Moya	Colombia	52.01	x	58.30	54.98	x	x	58.30	
2nd place, silver medalist(s)	Alessandra Resende	Brazil	54.29	57.01	51.83	x	x	53.37	57.01	
3rd place, bronze medalist(s)	Romina Maggi	Argentina	49.44	52.36	49.19	51.53	49.93	52.18	52.36	
4	Carla Bispo	Brazil	51.43	47.70	48.39	51.03	51.05	48.63	51.43	
5	María González	Venezuela	50.48	46.96	42.49	46.94	x	44.34	50.48	
6	Xiolimar Carolina Castillo	Venezuela	x	43.47	44.14	47.29	47.52	48.46	48.46	
7	Leryn Franco	Paraguay	x	x	x	x	x	45.06	45.06	

=== Heptathlon ===
The highest mark recorded in each event is highlighted in yellow

Rank	Athlete	Nationality	100m H	HJ	SP	200m	LJ	JT	800m	Points	Notes
1st place, gold medalist(s)	Thaimara Rivas	Venezuela	14.38	1.70	12.37	25.36	5.88	40.87	2:21.34	5622	
2nd place, silver medalist(s)	Elizete da Silva	Brazil	15.04	1.64	12.32	24.94	5.79	37.56	2:26.76	5334	
3rd place, bronze medalist(s)	Valeria Steffens	Chile	15.27	1.64	12.75	25.67	5.22	37.46	2:21.42	5169	
4	Patricia de Oliveira	Brazil	15.03	1.64	10.53	26.40	5.62	29.58	2:25.44	4903	
5	Nyota Peters	Guyana	18.10	1.70	10.09	26.63	5.59	30.96	2:24.22	4599	
6	Yolanda Mina	Colombia	16.35	1.64	9.81	25.98	5.54	25.12	2:34.50	4506	
7	Claritza Chourio	Venezuela	15.22	1.67	9.77	27.15	5.13	25.19	2:38.21	4419	
