= José Francisco Nava =

Chilean pole vaulter (born 1983)

Personal information
- Born: 19 January 1983 (age 43)

Sport
- Sport: Track and field
Medal record
Representing Chile
South American Games
Silver medal – second place	2002 Belem	Pole vault

José Francisco Nava (born 19 January 1983) is a Chilean former track and field athlete who competed in the pole vault. He achieved his personal best of 5.35 m (17 ft 6 1/2 in) in 2003. He also competed, less frequently, in the long jump, triple jump and decathlon.

His first major senior medal was a bronze at the 2002 Ibero-American Championships in Athletics – an honour he repeated in 2006. Nava competed at five editions of the South American Championships in Athletics from 2001 to 2007, having a best pole vault finish of fourth in 2001 and 2006. He was a participant at the Pan American Games in 2003 and 2007, and also the 2003 Summer Universiade.

He began his international career in 1998 and took silver medals behind compatriot Jorge Naranjo at the South American Youth and South American Junior Championships. He succeed Nava as the region's top young vaulter with championship records of 5.00 m (16 ft 4 3/4 in) and 5.10 m (16 ft 8 3/4 in) to win the youth and junior titles in 2000. He defended the junior title in 2001 before falling behind Brazil's Fábio Gomes da Silva in 2002. He also won a silver behind Naranjo during this period at the 2001 Pan American Junior Athletics Championships. He represented Chile at the 1999 World Youth Championships in Athletics and the World Junior Championships in Athletics in 2000 and 2002.

He also won gold medals at the 2007 ALBA Games and the South American University Games in 2004.

== International competitions ==
Year	Competition	Venue	Position	Event	Notes
1998	South American Youth Championships	Manaus, Brazil	2nd	Pole vault	4.20 m
1999	World Youth Championships	Bydgoszcz, Poland	14th (q)	Pole vault	4.40 m
1999	South American Junior Championships	Concepción, Chile	2nd	Pole vault	4.75 m
2000	South American Youth Championships	Bogotá, Colombia	1st	Pole vault	5.00 m
2000	World Junior Championships	Santiago, Chile	10th (q)	Pole vault	4.80 m
2000	Ibero-American Championships	Rio de Janeiro, Brazil	8th	Pole vault	4.60 m
2000	South American Junior Championships	São Leopoldo, Brazil	1st	Pole vault	5.10 m
2001	Pan American Junior Championships	Santa Fe, Argentina	2nd	Pole vault	5.25 m
2001	South American Junior Championships	Santa Fe, Argentina	1st	Pole vault	5.20 m
2001	South American Championships	Manaus, Brazil	4th	Pole vault	5.10 m
2002	World Junior Championships	Kingston, Jamaica	—	Pole vault	NH
2002	South American Games/ South American Junior Championships	Belém, Brazil	2nd	Pole vault	4.90 m
2002	Ibero-American Championships	Guatemala City, Guatemala	3rd	Pole vault	5.20 m
2003	South American Championships	Barquisimeto, Venezuela	8th	Pole vault	4.85 m
2003	Universiade	Daegu, South Korea	14th	Pole vault	5.00 m
2003	Pan American Games	Santo Domingo, Dominican Republic	7th	Pole vault	5.20 m
2004	South American U23 Championships	Barquisimeto, Venezuela	2nd	Pole vault	5.00 m
2004	South American U23 Championships	Barquisimeto, Venezuela	6th	Long jump	6.94 m
2004	South American U23 Championships	Barquisimeto, Venezuela	2nd	Triple jump	14.85 m
2004	Ibero-American Championships	Huelva, Spain	—	Pole vault	NH
2004	South American University Games	Concepción, Chile	1st	Pole vault	4.50 m
2005	South American Championships	Cali, Colombia	6th	Decathlon	6344 pts
2006	South American Championships	Tunja, Colombia	4th	Pole vault	5.15 m
2006	Ibero-American Championships	Ponce, Puerto Rico	3rd	Pole vault	5.25 m
2007	South American Championships	São Paulo, Brazil	5th	Pole vault	5.10 m
2007	South American Championships	São Paulo, Brazil	6th	Triple jump	14.82 m
2007	South American Championships	São Paulo, Brazil	7th	4 × 100 m relay	40.82
2007	ALBA Games	Caracas, Venezuela	1st	Pole vault	4.95 m
2007	Pan American Games	Rio de Janeiro, Brazil	—	Pole vault	NH
2008	Ibero-American Championships	Iquique, Chile	—	Pole vault	NH
2008	Ibero-American Championships	Iquique, Chile	6th	Triple jump	14.67 m
