= Athletics at the 2007 Pan American Games – Women's 200 metres =

Women's 200 metres at the Pan American Games

The women's 200 metres event at the 2007 Pan American Games was held on July 25–27.

== Medalists ==
Gold	Silver	Bronze
Roxana Díaz; Cuba	Sheri-Ann Brooks; Jamaica	Sherry Fletcher; Grenada

== Results ==
=== Heats ===
Qualification: First 3 of each heat (Q) and the next 4 fastest (q) qualified for the semifinals.

Wind:
Heat 1: +0.2 m/s, Heat 2: -0.1 m/s, Heat 3: +0.2 m/s, Heat 4: +0.4 m/s

Rank	Heat	Name	Nationality	Time	Notes
1	1	Felipa Palacios	Colombia	23.11	Q
2	1	Sherry Fletcher	Grenada	23.14	Q
3	1	Aleen Bailey	Jamaica	23.15	Q
4	2	Virgil Hodge	Saint Kitts and Nevis	23.16	Q
5	4	Roxana Díaz	Cuba	23.32	Q
6	2	Sheri-Ann Brooks	Jamaica	23.33	Q
7	2	Latonia Wilson	United States	23.39	Q
8	3	Shareese Woods	United States	23.44	Q
9	4	Adrienne Power	Canada	23.64	Q
10	2	Shaniqua Ferguson	Bahamas	23.68	q
11	3	Aymée Martínez	Cuba	23.75	Q
12	4	Nandelle Cameron	Trinidad and Tobago	23.78	Q
13	4	Thaissa Presti	Brazil	23.78	q
14	2	Darlenys Obregón	Colombia	23.96	q
15	3	Lucimar de Moura	Brazil	23.97	Q
16	3	Marleny Mejía	Dominican Republic	24.10	q
17	1	Reyare Thomas	Trinidad and Tobago	24.10	
18	4	Erika Chávez	Ecuador	24.47	PB
19	2	Valma Bass	United States Virgin Islands	24.48	
20	3	Shakera Reece	Barbados	24.69	
21	3	María Fernanda Mackenna	Chile	24.97	
22	1	Kirsten Nieuwendam	Suriname	25.02	
23	4	Kaina Martínez	Belize	25.66	
	1	Jade Bailey	Barbados	DNS	
	1	Ginou Etienne	Haiti	DNS	
	2	Carol Rodríguez	Puerto Rico	DNS	
	3	Zudikey Rodríguez	Mexico	DNS	
	4	Cydonie Mothersille	Cayman Islands	DNS	

=== Semifinals ===
Qualification: First 4 of each semifinal (Q) qualified directly for the final.

Wind:
Heat 1: +0.1 m/s, Heat 2: +0.7 m/s

Rank	Heat	Name	Nationality	Time	Notes
1	1	Sherry Fletcher	Grenada	22.86	Q
2	2	Roxana Díaz	Cuba	22.90	Q
3	2	Virgil Hodge	Saint Kitts and Nevis	22.93	Q
4	2	Sheri-Ann Brooks	Jamaica	22.94	Q
5	1	Felipa Palacios	Colombia	23.03	Q, SB
6	1	Shareese Woods	United States	23.11	Q
7	1	Aleen Bailey	Jamaica	23.13	Q
8	2	Latonia Wilson	United States	23.29	Q
9	1	Aymée Martínez	Cuba	23.37	
10	2	Adrienne Power	Canada	23.51	
11	2	Shaniqua Ferguson	Bahamas	23.70	
12	2	Lucimar de Moura	Brazil	23.73	
13	1	Nandelle Cameron	Trinidad and Tobago	23.76	
13	1	Thaissa Presti	Brazil	23.76	
13	2	Darlenys Obregón	Colombia	23.76	
16	1	Marleny Mejía	Dominican Republic	24.26	

=== Final ===
Wind: -0.6 m/s

Rank	Lane	Name	Nationality	Time	Notes
1st place, gold medalist(s)	6	Roxana Díaz	Cuba	22.90	
2nd place, silver medalist(s)	2	Sheri-Ann Brooks	Jamaica	22.92	
3rd place, bronze medalist(s)	4	Sherry Fletcher	Grenada	22.96	
4	5	Virgil Hodge	Saint Kitts and Nevis	23.05	
5	7	Aleen Bailey	Jamaica	23.09	
6	3	Felipa Palacios	Colombia	23.34	
7	8	Shareese Woods	United States	23.34	
8	1	Latonia Wilson	United States	23.50	
