= Athletics at the 2003 Pan American Games – Women's 100 metres =

Women's 100 metres at the Pan American Games

The final of the Women's 100 metres event at the 2003 Pan American Games took place on Wednesday August 6, 2003, with the heats staged a day earlier.

== Medalists ==
Gold	Lauryn Williams; United States
Silver	Angela Williams; United States
Bronze	Liliana Allen; Mexico

== Records ==
World Record	Florence Griffith-Joyner (USA)	10.49 s	July 16, 1988	Indianapolis, United States
Pan Am Record	Evelyn Ashford (USA)	11.07 s	July 8, 1979	San Juan, Puerto Rico

== Results ==
Rank	Athlete	Heats		Final
Rank	Athlete	Time	Rank	Time
1	Lauryn Williams (USA)	11.53	2	11.12
2	Angela Williams (USA)	11.59	5	11.15
3	Liliana Allen (MEX)	11.62	6	11.28
4	Virgen Benavides (CUB)	11.40	1	11.28
5	Tamicka Clarke (BAH)	11.54	3	11.39
6	Savatheda Fynes (BAH)	11.67	7	11.42
7	Judyth Kitson (JAM)	11.71	8	11.48
8	Fana Ashby (TRI)	11.56	4	11.52
9	Digna Luz Murillo (COL)	11.74	9	
10	Heather Samuel (ANT)	11.78	10	
11	Kelly-Ann Baptiste (TRI)	11.83	11	
12	Melisa Murillo (COL)	11.84	12	
13	María Carrión (DOM)	11.90	13	
13	Misleidys Lazo (CUB)	11.90	13	
15	Valma Bass (ISV)	12.15	15	
16	Marleni Mejía (DOM)	12.30	16	
17	Danielle St Leger (HAI)	12.84	17	
—	Kerron Stewart (JAM)	DNS	—	

== See also ==
- 2003 World Championships in Athletics – Women's 100 metres
- Athletics at the 2004 Summer Olympics – Women's 100 metres
