= Mariano Mastromarino =

Argentine steeplechase runner

Personal information
- Full name: Mariano Nicolás Mastromarino
- Born: September 15, 1982 (age 43) Mar del Plata, Argentina
- Height: 1.69 m (5 ft 7 in)
- Weight: 56 kg (123 lb)

Sport
- Country: Argentina
- Sport: Athletics
- Event: Long-distance running
- Updated on 1 May 2014

Mariano Nicolás Mastromarino (born 15 September 1982) is an Argentine athlete specialising in the 3000 metres steeplechase. He has won several medals at the regional level.

== Competition record ==
Year	Competition	Venue	Position	Event	Notes
Representing Argentina
1999	South American Junior Championships	Concepción, Chile	2nd	3000 m s'chase	9:14.94
2000	South American Junior Championships	São Leopoldo, Brazil	2nd	3000 m s'chase	9:02.00
2000	World Junior Championships	Santiago, Chile	27th (h)	3000 m s'chase	9:25.72
2001	South American Junior Championships	Santa Fe, Argentina	1st	3000 m s'chase	8:54.51
2001	Pan American Junior Championships	Santa Fe, Argentina	1st	3000 m s'chase	9:04.54
2003	South American Cross Country Championships	Asunción, Paraguay	12th	4 km (Short race)	13:50
2003	South American Championships	Barquisimeto, Venezuela	5th	3000 m s'chase	9:16.79
2004	South American U23 Championships	Barquisimeto, Venezuela	—	10,000m	DNF
2004	South American U23 Championships	Barquisimeto, Venezuela	1st	3000m steeplechase	8:54.92
2004	Ibero-American Championships	Huelva, Spain	7th	3000 m s'chase	8:47.17
2005	South American Cross Country Championships	Montevideo, Uruguay	23rd	4 km (Short race)	13:33
2005	South American Championships	Cali, Colombia	1st	3000 m s'chase	9:02.89
2006	South American Cross Country Championships	Mar del Plata, Argentina	17th	4 km (Short race)	11:55
2006	Ibero-American Championships	Ponce, Puerto Rico	6th	3000 m s'chase	8:54.92
2006	South American Championships	Tunja, Colombia	6th	3000 m s'chase	9:44.62
2007	South American Championships	São Paulo, Brazil	6th	3000 m steeplechase	9:10.72
2008	Ibero-American Championships	Iquique, Chile	–	3000 m	DQ
2008	Ibero-American Championships	Iquique, Chile	6th	3000 m s'chase	8:59.26
2009	South American Championships	Lima, Peru	3rd	3000 m s'chase	8:51.48
2010	Ibero-American Championships	San Fernando, Spain	9th	3000 m	8:38.62
2010	Ibero-American Championships	San Fernando, Spain	7th	3000 m s'chase	9:02.62
2011	South American Championships	Buenos Aires, Argentina	3rd	3000 m s'chase	8:38.91
2011	Pan American Games	Guadalajara, Mexico	10th	3000 m s'chase	9:09.42
2012	Ibero-American Championships	Barquisimeto, Venezuela	4th	3000 m s'chase	8:59.20
2014	South American Games	Santiago, Chile	3rd	3000 m s'chase	8:48.11
2015	Pan American Games	Toronto, Canada	3rd	Marathon	2:17:45
2017	Berlin Half Marathon	Berlin, Germany	11th	Half Marathon	1:04:48
2017	South American Championships	Asunción, Paraguay	4th	5000 m	14:25.06
2017	South American Championships	Asunción, Paraguay	–	10,000 m	DNF
2019	Pan American Games	Lima, Peru	13th	Marathon	2:20:15

== Personal bests ==
- 10,000 metres – 29:47.69 (Mar del Plata, Argentina, 30 March 2013)
- Marathon – 2:15:28 (Buenos Aires, Argentina, 12 October 2014)
- 3000 metres steeplechase – 8:36.75 (Buenos Aires, Argentina, 2 June 2012)
