= 2000 World Junior Championships in Athletics – Men's 4 × 400 metres relay =

The men's 4x400 metres relay event at the 2000 World Junior Championships in Athletics was held in Santiago, Chile, at Estadio Nacional Julio Martínez Prádanos on 21 and 22 October.

== Medalists ==
Gold	Sékou Clarke; Aldwyn Sappleton; Pete Coley; Brandon Simpson; Jamaica
Silver	Sebastian Gatzka; Christian Duma; Steffen Hönig; Bastian Swillims; Germany
Bronze	Rafał Wieruszewski; Karol Terejlis; Adrian Galaszewski; Marek Plawgo; Poland

== Results ==
=== Final ===
22 October

Rank	Nation	Competitors	Time	Notes
1st place, gold medalist(s)	Jamaica	Sékou Clarke; Aldwyn Sappleton; Pete Coley; Brandon Simpson	3:06.06	
2nd place, silver medalist(s)	Germany	Sebastian Gatzka; Christian Duma; Steffen Hönig; Bastian Swillims	3:06.79	
3rd place, bronze medalist(s)	Poland	Rafał Wieruszewski; Karol Terejlis; Adrian Galaszewski; Marek Plawgo	3:07.05	
4	South Africa	Richard Sharp; Mandla Nkosi; Pieter de Villiers; Tshepo Thobelangope	3:07.66	
5	Spain	David Melo; Daniel Ruíz; Miguel Angel Lira; Antonio Manuel Reina	3:09.22	
6	Venezuela	William Hernández; Jonathan Palma; Simoncito Silvera; Dany Núñez	3:09.71	
7	Chile	Sebastián Martínez; Javier Cavagnaro; Sebastián Cantuarias; Guillermo Mayer	3:12.25	
8	Australia	Courtney McLeod; Cameron Brown; David Cappellano; Andrew Cameron	3:14.44	

=== Heats ===
21 October

==== Heat 1 ====
Rank	Nation	Competitors	Time	Notes
1	Germany	Bastian Swillims; Richard Petzold; Steffen Hönig; René Herms	3:09.76	Q
2	Australia	Courtney McLeod; Cameron Brown; David Cappellano; Mark Ormrod	3:10.41	Q
3	Venezuela	Dany Núñez; Simoncito Silvera; Jonathan Palma; William Hernández	3:10.74	Q
4	Trinidad and Tobago	Sherridan Kirk; Dion Rodriguez; Kirk Rudder; Damion Barry	3:10.99	
5	Kenya	Daniel Kibet; Nicholas Wachira; Vincent Kemboi; Japheth Ogamba	3:11.17	

==== Heat 2 ====
Rank	Nation	Competitors	Time	Notes
1	Poland	Tomasz Smolarczyk; Karol Terejlis; Adrian Galaszewski; Rafał Wieruszewski	3:08.49	Q
2	Spain	David Melo; Daniel Ruíz; Miguel Angel Lira; Antonio Manuel Reina	3:08.50	Q
3	Jamaica	Pete Coley; Sékou Clarke; DeWayne Barrett; Brandon Simpson	3:08.50	Q
4	South Africa	Tshepo Thobelangope; Mandla Nkosi; Jako Burgers; Richard Sharp	3:09.46	q
5	Chile	Sebastián Martínez; Javier Cavagnaro; Sebastián Cantuarias; Guillermo Mayer	3:10.92	q
6	Japan	Shinji Ishikawa; Masakatsu Tanaka; Shinji Itabashi; Hisatoshi Hotta	3:11.22	

== Participation ==
According to an unofficial count, 50 athletes from 11 countries participated in the event.

- Australia (5)
- Chile (4)
- Germany (6)
- Jamaica (5)
- Japan (4)
- Kenya (4)
- Poland (5)
- South Africa (5)
- Spain (4)
- Trinidad and Tobago (4)
- Venezuela (4)
