= Melisa Murillo =

Colombian sprinter (born 1982)

Personal information
- Nationality: Colombian
- Born: January 13, 1982 (age 44) El Cerrito, Valle del Cauca

Sport
- Sport: Athletics

Achievements and titles
- Olympic finals: Heats, 2004
- Personal best: 100 metres – 11.22, 200 metres – 24.94, 60 metres – 7.43
Medal record
Representing Colombia
Central American and Caribbean Games
Gold medal – first place	2002 San Salvador	4x100m relay
- Updated on 20 August 2016

Melisa Murillo Rivas (born 13 January 1982, in El Cerrito, Valle del Cauca) is a retired Colombian athlete who specialised in the sprinting events. She represented her country at the 2004 Summer Olympics. She was also the reserve relay member at the 2000 Summer Olympics but was not selected to run.

== Competition record ==
Year	Competition	Venue	Position	Event	Notes
Representing Colombia
1996	South American Youth Championships	Asunción, Paraguay	6th	200 m	26.17
1996	South American Youth Championships	Asunción, Paraguay	8th	400 m	63.03
1996	South American Youth Championships	Asunción, Paraguay	2nd	4 × 400 m	3:55.55
1999	Pan American Junior Championships	Tampa, United States	4th	4 × 100 m	46.17
1999	World Youth Championships	Bydgoszcz, Poland	15th (sf)	100 m	12.03
1999	World Youth Championships	Bydgoszcz, Poland	20th (sf)	200 m	25.22
1999	South American Junior Championships	Concepción, Chile	3rd	100 m	11.76
1999	South American Junior Championships	Concepción, Chile	1st	4 × 100 m	45.87
2000	Central American and Caribbean Junior Championships (U20)	San Juan, Puerto Rico	5th	100 m	11.94
2000	Central American and Caribbean Junior Championships (U20)	San Juan, Puerto Rico	7th	200 m	25.03 (w)
2000	World Junior Championships	Santiago, Chile	10th (sf)	100m	11.84 (wind: -1.5 m/s)
2000	World Junior Championships	Santiago, Chile	—	4 × 400 m relay	DQ
2001	South American Junior Championships	Santa Fe, Argentina	2nd	100 m	12.03
2001	South American Junior Championships	Santa Fe, Argentina	3rd	200 m	24.37
2001	South American Junior Championships	Santa Fe, Argentina	2nd	4 × 100 m	45.92
2001	Pan American Junior Championships	Santa Fe, Argentina	4th	100 m	11.95
2001	Pan American Junior Championships	Santa Fe, Argentina	3rd	200 m	24.28 (w)
2001	Pan American Junior Championships	Santa Fe, Argentina	3rd	4 × 100 m	46.89
2002	Ibero-American Championships	Guatemala City, Guatemala	6th	100 m	11.74
2002	Ibero-American Championships	Guatemala City, Guatemala	2nd	4 × 100 m	44.44
2002	Central American and Caribbean Games	San Salvador, El Salvador	6th	100m	12.04 w (wind: 2.3 m/s)
2002	Central American and Caribbean Games	San Salvador, El Salvador	—	200m	DNF
2002	Central American and Caribbean Games	San Salvador, El Salvador	1st	4 × 100 m relay	45.34
2003	South American Championships	Barquisimeto, Venezuela	5th	100 m	11.71
2003	South American Championships	Barquisimeto, Venezuela	8th	200 m	24.51
2003	South American Championships	Barquisimeto, Venezuela	2nd	4 × 100 m	44.67
2003	Pan American Games	Santo Domingo, Dom. Rep.	12th (h)	100 m	11.84
2003	Pan American Games	Santo Domingo, Dom. Rep.	5th	4 × 100 m	45.13
2004	South American U23 Championships	Barquisimeto, Venezuela	2nd	100m	11.78 (wind: +0.0 m/s)
2004	South American U23 Championships	Barquisimeto, Venezuela	1st	4 × 100 m relay	43.46
2004	Ibero-American Championships	Huelva, Spain	6th	100 m	11.77
2004	Ibero-American Championships	Huelva, Spain	2nd	4 × 100 m	43.79
2004	Olympic Games	Athens, Greece	42nd (h)	100 m	11.67
2004	Olympic Games	Athens, Greece	10th (h)	4 × 100 m	43.30
2005	South American Championships	Tunja, Colombia	2nd	100 m	11.39
2005	South American Championships	Tunja, Colombia	1st	4 × 100 m	43.17
2005	World Championships	Helsinki, Finland	33rd (h)	100 m	11.71
2005	World Championships	Helsinki, Finland	6th	4 × 100 m	43.07
2006	Ibero-American Championships	Ponce, Puerto Rico	5th	100 m	11.80
2006	Ibero-American Championships	Ponce, Puerto Rico	3rd	4 × 100 m	44.79

== Personal bests ==
Outdoor

- 100 metres – 11.22 (+1.6 m/s) (Armenia 2005)
- 200 metres – 24.94 (-0.9 m/s) (Bydgoszcz 1999)

Indoor

- 60 metres – 7.43 (Boston 2004)
