= Simoncito Silvera =

Venezuelan middle-distance runner

Personal information
- Born: 20 August 1982 (age 43)

Sport
- Sport: Track and field
Medal record
Representing Venezuela
South American Championships
Gold medal – first place	2001 Manaus	4 × 400 m relay
Silver medal – second place	2007 São Paulo	4 × 400 m relay
Bronze medal – third place	2001 Manaus	800 m
Bronze medal – third place	2003 Barquisimeto	800 m

Simoncito Silvera (born 20 August 1982) is a Venezuelan former track and field athlete who specialised in the 800 metres. He holds a personal best of 1:47.26 minutes for the distance. He is a four-time medallist at the South American Championships in Athletics, including 800 m bronze medals in 2001 and 2003. He won five national titles over 800 m from 1999 to 2005. He was a double bronze medallist at the 2004 Ibero-American Championships in Athletics.

Silvera enjoyed success with the Venezuelan men's 4 × 400 metres relay team, winning the gold medal at the 2001 South American Championships in Athletics and a silver at the same event in 2007. He represented his country in that event at the 2001 World Championships in Athletics.

As a young athlete, he was among the most promising runners of his generation, having own gold medals at the South American Youth Championships in Athletics and the South American Junior Championships in Athletics. His winning time of 1:48.53 minutes for the 800 m at the junior competition remains a championship record, as of 2016. He won silver medals at Central American and Caribbean Junior and South American Under-23 levels. Silvera competed for his country at the 1999 World Youth Championships in Athletics and the 2000 World Junior Championships in Athletics.

== Personal bests ==
- 400 metres – 46.54 min (2001)
- 800 metres – 1:47.26 min (2004)

== International competitions ==
Year	Competition	Venue	Position	Event	Notes
1998	South American Youth Championships	Manaus, Brazil	1st	800 m	1:58.54
1998	South American Youth Championships	Manaus, Brazil	3rd	4 × 400 m relay	3:23.96
1999	World Youth Championships	Bydgoszcz, Poland	5th (h)	800 m	1:56.41
2000	South American Junior Championships	São Leopoldo, Brazil	2nd	800 m	1:50.54
2000	South American Junior Championships	São Leopoldo, Brazil	1st	4 × 400 m relay	3:16.77
2000	CAC Junior Championships	San Juan, Puerto Rico	2nd	800 m	1:52.28
2000	CAC Junior Championships	San Juan, Puerto Rico	2nd	1500 m	3:58.76
2000	CAC Junior Championships	San Juan, Puerto Rico	2nd	4 × 400 m relay	3:12.59
2000	World Junior Championships	Santiago, Chile	6th	4 × 400 m relay	3:09.71
2000	Ibero-American Championships	Rio de Janeiro, Brazil	4th	800 m	1:50.61
2000	Ibero-American Championships	Rio de Janeiro, Brazil	9th	1500 m	4:00.16
2001	CAC Championships	Guatemala City, Guatemala	3rd	800 m	1:48.12
2001	South American Championships	Manaus, Brazil	3rd	800 m	1:48.54
2001	South American Championships	Manaus, Brazil	1st	4 × 400 m relay	3:06.31
2001	World Championships	Edmonton, Alberta, Canada	8th (h)	4 × 400 m relay	3:05.37
2001	Bolivarian Games	Ambato, Ecuador	1st	800 m	1:50.02
2001	Pan American Junior Championships	Santa Fe, Argentina	1st	800 m	1:50.95
2001	Pan American Junior Championships	Santa Fe, Argentina	2nd	4 × 400 m relay	3:14.06
2001	South American Junior Championships	Santa Fe, Argentina	1st	400 m	46.54
2001	South American Junior Championships	Santa Fe, Argentina	1st	800 m	1:48.53 CR
2001	South American Junior Championships	Santa Fe, Argentina	2nd	4 × 400 m relay	3:09.91
2003	CAC Championships	St. George's, Grenada	6th	800 m	1:51.00
2003	CAC Championships	St. George's, Grenada	4th	4 × 400 m relay	3:05.44
2003	South American Championships	Barquisimeto, Venezuela	3rd	800 m	1:48.31
2003	Pan American Games	Santo Domingo, Dominican Republic	7th	4 × 400 m relay	3:06.52
2004	Ibero-American Championships	Huelva, Spain	3rd	800 m	1:47.26
2004	Ibero-American Championships	Huelva, Spain	3rd	4 × 400 m relay	3:10.41
2004	South American U23 Championships	Barquisimeto, Venezuela	2nd	800 m	1:47.53
2004	South American U23 Championships	Barquisimeto, Venezuela	2nd	4 × 400 m relay	3:09.00
2005	Bolivarian Games	Armenia, Colombia	1st	800 m	1:51.26
2005	Bolivarian Games	Armenia, Colombia	2nd	4 × 400 m relay	3:08.16
2006	Ibero-American Championships	Ponce, Puerto Rico	8th	800 m	1:50.12
2006	CAC Games	Cartagena, Colombia	8th	800 m	1:52.46
2007	South American Championships	São Paulo, Brazil	4th	800 m	1:50.18
2007	South American Championships	São Paulo, Brazil	2nd	4 × 400 m relay	3:05.88
2007	ALBA Games	Caracas, Venezuela	3rd	800m	1:49.13

== National titles ==
- Venezuelan Athletics Championships
  - 800 m: 1999, 2000, 2001, 2003, 2005
