= 2001 Pan American Junior Athletics Championships =

XI Pan American Junior Athletics Championships
- Dates: October 18–20
- Host city: Santa Fe, Argentina
- Venue: Centro de Alto Rendimiento Deportivo Pedro Candioti
- Level: Junior
- Events: 43
- Participation: about 296 athletes from 25 nations

The 11th Pan American Junior Athletics Championships were held at the Centro de Alto Rendimiento Deportivo Pedro Candioti in Santa Fe, Argentina, from October 18–20, 2001.

== Participation (unofficial) ==
Detailed result lists can be found on the "World Junior Athletics History" website. An unofficial count yields the number of about 296 athletes from about 25 countries: Antigua and Barbuda (1), Argentina (40), Barbados (1), Bolivia (3), Brazil (44), Canada (48), Cayman Islands (1), Chile (14), Colombia (19), Costa Rica (1), Cuba (8), Dominican Republic (8), Ecuador (7), El Salvador (2), Guyana (2), Jamaica (19), Mexico (22), Panama (2), Paraguay (2), Peru (5), Suriname (2), Trinidad and Tobago (10), United States (15), Uruguay (5), Venezuela (15).

== Medal summary ==
Medal winners are published. Complete results can be found on the "World Junior Athletics History" website.

=== Men ===
Event	Gold		Silver		Bronze	
100 metres	Marc Burns (TRI)	10.28	Darrel Brown (TRI)	10.49	Steve Mullings (JAM)	10.59
200 metres	Alianny Echevarría (CUB)	21.16	Bruno Pacheco (BRA)	21.38	Dion Rodriguez (TRI)	21.43
400 metres	Damion Barry (TRI)	46.40	Luís Ambrósio (BRA)	47.09	John Valoyes (COL)	47.48
800 metres	Simoncito Silvera (VEN)	1:50.95	Juan Luis Barrios (MEX)	1:51.97	Shaun Smith (JAM)	1:52.88
1500 metres	Fabiano Peçanha (BRA)	3:50.38	Juan Luis Barrios (MEX)	3:51.16	José Manuel González (VEN)	3:54.63
5000 metres	Fernando Fernandes (BRA)	14:34.15	Franck de Almeida (BRA)	14:35.34	Antonio Cortez (MEX)	14:35.75
10,000 metres	Franck de Almeida (BRA)	30:28.73	Antonio Cortez (MEX)	31:04.38	Miguel Bárzola (ARG)	31:07.09
3000 metres steeplechase	Mariano Mastromarino (ARG)	9:04.54	Fernando Fernandes (BRA)	9:06.89	José Rojas (VEN)	9:23.64
110 metres hurdles	Thiago Dias (BRA)	14.24	Diego Morán (ARG)	15.04	Luis López Leyva (MEX)	15.16
400 metres hurdles	José Ferrín (ECU)	53.05	Miguel Oyarce (CHI)	53.16	Josh Guggenheimer (CAN)	53.50
4 × 100 metres relay	Brazil; André Oliveira; Bruno Campos; Basilio de Morais; Bruno Pacheco	40.33	Jamaica; Asafa Powell; Steve Mullings; Winston Smith; Orlando Reid	40.36	Trinidad and Tobago; Dion Rodriguez; Marc Burns; Dwight Neptune; Darrel Brown	40.37
4 × 400 metres relay	Brazil; Luiz da Silveira; Luís Ambrósio; Bruno Pacheco; Luíz de Oliveira	3:10.98	Venezuela; José Acevedo; Olwin Granados; Luis Luna; Simoncito Silvera	3:14.06	Jamaica; Carlington Marsh; Lansford Spence; Shaun Smith; Greg Little	3:17.66
10,000 metres track walk	Horacio Nava (MEX)	43:33.92	Andrés Chocho (ECU)	43:58.89	Rafael dos Anjos Duarte (BRA)	44:08.41
High jump	Lisvany Pérez (CUB)	2.18	Keith Moffatt (USA)	2.18	Jason Hill (USA)	2.15
Pole vault	Jorge Naranjo (CHI)	5.30	José Francisco Nava (CHI)	5.20	Fábio da Silva (BRA)	5.15
Long jump	Cleavon Dillon (TRI)	7.77	Thiago Dias (BRA)	7.59	Allen Simms (USA)	7.56
Triple jump	Yoandri Betanzos (CUB)	16.47	Jefferson Sabino (BRA)	15.89	Ibrahim Camejo (CUB)	15.75
Shot put	Jeff Chakouian (USA)	19.92	Edmundo Martínez (VEN)	16.94	Gustavo de Mendonça (BRA)	16.68
Discus throw	Héctor Hurtado (VEN)	52.90	Germán Lauro (ARG)	50.14	Gustavo de Mendonça (BRA)	49.53
Hammer throw	Fabián Di Paolo (ARG)	65.04	Lucas Andino (ARG)	62.70	Luis García (MEX)	60.37
Javelin throw	Trevor Snyder (CAN)	74.06	Alexon Maximiano (BRA)	70.68	Pablo Alfano (ARG)	67.74
Decathlon	Ivan da Silva (BRA)	7107	André Salvino (BRA)	6282	Patrick Russell (TRI)	6275

=== Women ===
Event	Gold		Silver		Bronze	
100 metres	Thatiana Ignácio (BRA)	11.54	Ashley Purnell (CAN)	11.93	Evelyn dos Santos (BRA)	11.94
200 metres	Norma González (COL)	23.88w	Ashley Purnell (CAN)	23.97w	Melisa Murillo (COL)	24.28w
400 metres	Norma González (COL)	53.38	Patricia Mayers (CAN)	54.41	Sheryl Morgan (JAM)	54.74
800 metres	Janill Williams (ATG)	2:13.36	Jennifer Kemp (CAN)	2:15.20	Jorgelina Litterini (ARG)	2:16.54
1500 metres	Adriana Muñoz (CUB)	4:36.73	Evelyn Guerra (PAN)	4:41.34	Yolanda Caballero (COL)	4:42.64
3000 metres	Inés Melchor (PER)	10:11.50	Karina Pérez (MEX)	10:13.45	Evelyn Guerra (PAN)	10:14.40
5000 metres	Janill Williams (ATG)	17:22.13	Inés Melchor (PER)	17:28.18	María Elena Valencia (MEX)	17:32.51
100 metres hurdles	Ashley Purnell (CAN)	14.29	Brigith Merlano (COL)	14.65	Lucila Contreras (MEX)	15.14
400 metres hurdles	Perla dos Santos (BRA)	56.52	Yusmelis García (CUB)	59.59	Lucy Jaramillo (ECU)	59.82
4 × 100 metres relay	Brazil; Renata Sampaio; Alessandra Joaquim; Thatiana Ignâcio; Evelyn dos Santos	45.36	Jamaica; Shaunette Davidson; Pete-Gaye Beckford; Tracy-Ann Rowe; Diane Dietrich	46.78	Colombia; Sonia Petty; Norma González; Caterine Ibargüen; Melisa Murillo	46.89
4 × 400 metres relay	Brazil; Perla dos Santos; Francinete Araujo; Evelyn dos Santos; Joyce Prieto	3:45.84	Jamaica; Shauna-Kay Campbell; Pete-Gaye Beckford; Tracy-Ann Rowe; Sheryl Morgan	3:53.16	Canada; Tara Halls; Julia Howard; Brianna Fitzpatrick; Patricia Mayers	3:55.00
10,000 metres track walk	Cristina López (ESA)	51:41.9	Alessandra Picagevicz (BRA)	52:03.9	Ariana Quino (BOL)	52:06.6
High jump	Kristen Matthews (CAN)	1.77	Shaunette Davidson (JAM); Catherine Ibargüen (COL)	1.77		
Pole vault	Lacy Janson (USA)	3.85	Kelsie Hendry (CAN)	3.85	María Paz Ausín (CHI)	3.85
Long jump	Fernanda Gonçalves (BRA)	6.10	Jennifer Arveláez (VEN)	5.98	Keila Costa (BRA)	5.97
Triple jump	Mabel Gay (CUB)	13.63	Keila Costa (BRA)	13.55	Jennifer Arveláez (VEN)	13.24
Shot put	Jillian Camarena (USA)	15.90	Yanira Hurtado (VEN)	14.17	Kate Forbes (CAN)	14.05
Discus throw	Melissa Bickett (USA)	49.36	Arelis Quiñones (COL)	46.09	Karina Díaz (ECU)	44.50
Hammer throw	Yunaika Crawford (CUB)	63.20	Jennifer Dahlgren (ARG)	57.18	Alessandra Peixoto (BRA)	54.39
Javelin throw	Ana Gutiérrez (MEX)	49.23	Leryn Franco (PAR)	47.28	Lirice González (CUB)	45.90
Heptathlon	Valeria Steffens (CHI)	4956	Katiusca Venâncio (BRA)	4915	Thaimara Rivas (VEN)	4832

== Medal table (unofficial) ==
* Host nation (Argentina)

Rank	Nation	Gold	Silver	Bronze	Total
1	Brazil	12	11	7	30
2	Cuba	6	1	2	9
3	United States	4	1	2	7
4	Canada	3	5	3	11
5	Trinidad and Tobago	3	1	3	7
6	Mexico	2	4	5	11
7	Venezuela	2	4	4	10
8	Argentina*	2	4	3	9
9	Colombia	2	3	4	9
10	Chile	2	2	1	5
11	Netherlands Antilles	2	0	0	2
12	Ecuador	1	1	2	4
13	Peru	1	1	0	2
14	El Salvador	1	0	0	1
15	Jamaica	0	4	4	8
16	Panama	0	1	1	2
17	Paraguay	0	1	0	1
18	Bolivia	0	0	1	1
Totals (18 entries)		43	44	42	129
