= Judyth Kitson =

Jamaican sprinter

Personal information
- Born: 2 November 1979 (age 46)

Sport
- Sport: Track and field
Medal record
Representing Jamaica
Pan American Games
Bronze medal – third place	2003 Santo Domingo	4x100m relay

Judyth Kitson (born 2 November 1979) is a retired female track and field sprinter from Jamaica, who specialized in the 100 metres. Her personal best time was 11.26 seconds, achieved in May 2003 in Knoxville and also in June 2003 in Kingston, Jamaica.

Kitson was an All-American sprinter for the Alabama Crimson Tide track and field team, finishing 7th in the 100 metres at the 2003 NCAA Division I Outdoor Track and Field Championships.

At the 2003 Pan American Games she finished seventh in the 100 metres, eighth in the 200 metres and won a bronze medal in the 4x100 metre relay. She competed at the 2003 World Championships without reaching the final.

== Achievements ==
Year	Competition	Venue	Position	Event	Notes
Representing Jamaica
2003	Pan American Games	Santo Domingo, Dominican Republic	7th	100 m	
2003	Pan American Games	Santo Domingo, Dominican Republic	8th	200 m	
2003	Pan American Games	Santo Domingo, Dominican Republic	3rd	4 × 100 m relay	
