= Jonathan Palma =

Venezuelan sprinter (born 1981)

Personal information
- Born: 8 December 1981 (age 44)

Sport
- Sport: Track and field
Medal record
Representing Venezuela
Central American and Caribbean Games
Bronze medal – third place	2002 San Salvador	4x400m relay

Jonathan Palma (born 8 December 1981) is a retired Venezuelan sprinter who specialised in the 400 metres. He won multiple medals on the regional level.

His personal best of 45.55, set in Ambato in 2001, is the current national record.

== Competition record ==
Year	Competition	Venue	Position	Event	Notes
Representing Venezuela
1999	South American Championships	Bogotá, Colombia	6th	400 m	47.78
1999	South American Championships	Bogotá, Colombia	4th	4 × 400 m	3:11.22
1999	Pan American Junior Championships	Tampa, United States	6th	400 m	47.91
1999	South American Junior Championships	Concepción, Chile	1st	800 m	1:51.36
1999	South American Junior Championships	Concepción, Chile	2nd	4 × 100 m	41.46
1999	South American Junior Championships	Concepción, Chile	1st	4 × 400 m	3:13.25
2000	Central American and Caribbean Junior Championships (U20)	San Juan, Puerto Rico	6th	400 m	48.13
2000	Central American and Caribbean Junior Championships (U20)	San Juan, Puerto Rico	7th	800 m	1:59.24
2000	Central American and Caribbean Junior Championships (U20)	San Juan, Puerto Rico	2nd	4 × 400 m	3:12.59
2000	South American Junior Championships	São Leopoldo, Brazil	2nd	400 m	46.71
2000	South American Junior Championships	São Leopoldo, Brazil	1st	800 m	1:50.18
2000	South American Junior Championships	São Leopoldo, Brazil	1st	4 × 400 m	3:16.77
2000	World Junior Championships	Santiago, Chile	7th	400 m	46.36
2000	World Junior Championships	Santiago, Chile	6th	4 × 400 m	3:09.71
2001	South American Championships	Manaus, Brazil	3rd	400 m	46.78
2001	South American Championships	Manaus, Brazil	1st	4 × 400 m	3:06.31
2001	Central American and Caribbean Championships	Guatemala City, Guatemala	8th (h)	400 m	47.43
2001	World Championships	Edmonton, Canada	21st (h)	4 × 400 m	3:05.37
2002	Ibero-American Championships	Guatemala City, Guatemala	2nd	400 m	46.09
2002	Ibero-American Championships	Guatemala City, Guatemala	2nd	4 × 400 m	3:08.87
2002	Central American and Caribbean Games	San Salvador, El Salvador	3rd	4 × 400 m relay	3:05.71
2003	South American Championships	Barquisimeto, Venezuela	5th	400 m	46.84
2003	South American Championships	Barquisimeto, Venezuela	2nd	4 × 400 m	3:09.26
2003	Central American and Caribbean Championships	St. George's, Grenada	15th (h)	400 m	47.40
2003	Central American and Caribbean Championships	St. George's, Grenada	4th	4 × 400 m	3:05.44
2003	Pan American Games	Santo Domingo, Dom. Rep.	7th	4 × 400 m	3:06.52
2004	Ibero-American Championships	Huelva, Spain	10th (h)	400 m	46.96
2004	Ibero-American Championships	Huelva, Spain	3rd	4 × 400 m	3:10.41
