= 2000 South American Junior Championships in Athletics =

XXXII South American Junior Championships in Athletics
- Dates: October 7–8
- Host city: São Leopoldo, Brazil
- Venue: University of Unisinos Track club
- Level: Junior
- Events: 44
- Participation: about 260 athletes from 11 nations

The 32nd South American Junior Championships in Athletics were held in São Leopoldo, Brazil at the University of Unisinos Track club from October 7–8, 2000. Athletes from Portugal were invited to participate as guests.

== Participation (unofficial) ==
Detailed result lists can be found on the CBAt, on the IAAF and on the "World Junior Athletics History" website. An unofficial count (without the Portuguese guest athletes) yields the number of about 260 athletes from about 11 countries: Argentina (53), Bolivia (3), Brazil (66), Chile (46), Colombia (8), Ecuador (16), Panama (2), Paraguay (24), Peru (3), Uruguay (14), Venezuela (25).

== Medal summary ==
Medal winners are published for men and women Complete results can be found on the CBAt, on the IAAF and on the "World Junior Athletics History" website.

=== Men ===
| Event | Gold | | Silver | | Bronze | |
|---|---|---|---|---|---|---|
| 100 metres | Bruno Campos (BRA) | 10.74 | Helly Ollarves (VEN) | 10.75 | Pablo Del Valle (ARG) | 10.99 |
| 200 metres | Pablo Del Valle (ARG) | 21.36w | Guillermo Mayer (CHI) | 21.75w | Basílio de Moraes (BRA) | 21.99w |
| 400 metres | William Hernández (VEN) | 46.43 | Jonathan Palma (VEN) | 46.71 | Anderson da Silva (BRA) | 48.24 |
| 800 metres | Jonathan Palma (VEN) | 1:50.18 | Simoncito Silvera (VEN) | 1:50.54 | Fabiano Peçanha (BRA) | 1:52.42 |
| 1500 metres | Sebastián Gesualdo (ARG) | 3:54.43 | Byron Piedra (ECU) | 3:54.70 | Fabiano Peçanha (BRA) | 3:54.89 |
| 5000 metres | César Pelaluisa (ECU) | 15:01.38 | Jorge Cabrera (PAR) | 15:05.94 | Rodrigo Bedezagar (ARG) | 15:09.31 |
| 10,000 metres | Jonathan Monje (CHI) | 30:36.01 | Jorge Cabrera (PAR) | 30:39.51 | Franck de Almeida (BRA) | 30:42.31 |
| 3000 metres steeplechase | Fernando Fernandes (BRA) | 8:59.12 | Mariano Mastromarino (ARG) | 9:02.00 | Sergio Lobos (CHI) | 9:02.21 |
| 110 metres hurdles | Mateus Inocêncio (BRA) | 14.53 | Marleán Reyna (VEN) | 14.67 | Diego Morán (ARG) | 14.73 |
| 400 metres hurdles | Jorge Chaverra (COL) | 52.23 | Luis Montenegro (CHI) | 52.37 | William Pereira (BRA) | 52.84 |
| High jump | Jessé de Lima (BRA) | 2.09 | Santiago Guerci (ARG) | 2.09 | Sidney Reinhold (BRA) | 2.09 |
| Pole vault | José Francisco Nava (CHI) | 5.10 | Fábio da Silva (BRA) | 5.00 | Cristián Castillo (CHI) | 4.90 |
| Long jump | Víctor Castillo (VEN) | 7.70 | Thiago Dias (BRA) | 7.58 | Marcelo da Costa (BRA) | 7.52 |
| Triple jump | Marcelo da Costa (BRA) | 16.22w | Piero Vojvodic (PER) | 15.52w | Jefferson Sabino (BRA) | 15.49w |
| Shot put | Mateus Monari (BRA) | 16.36 | Edmundo Martínez (VEN) | 16.30 | Daniel Muñoz (CHI) | 15.90 |
| Discus throw | Héctor Hurtado (VEN) | 49.37 | Mateus Monari (BRA) | 47.26 | Jesús Parejo (VEN) | 45.83 |
| Hammer throw | Lucas Andino (ARG) | 60.41 | Fabián Di Paolo (ARG) | 58.14 | Roberto Sáez (CHI) | 55.87 |
| Javelin throw | Pablo Alfano (ARG) | 68.90 | Ronald Noguera (VEN) | 67.40 | Alexon Maximiano (BRA) | 67.01 |
| Decathlon | Ivan da Silva (BRA) | 6874 | Rubén Arcía (VEN) | 6363 | Gabriel Paredes (ARG) | 6263 |
| 10,000 metres track walk | Cristián Muñoz (CHI) | 42:32.85 | José Alessandro Bagio (BRA) | 43:42.47 | John Jairo García (COL) | 44:14.06 |
| 4 × 100 metres relay | Brazil; Flavio da Silva; Anselmo da Silva; Basilio de Morais; Bruno Campos | 41.08 | Chile; Iván Sandoval; Sebastian Valenzuela; Rodrigo Díaz; Diego Valdés | 41.34 | Colombia; Wilmer Murillo; Jacner Palacios; Jorge Chaverra; Jackson Moreno | 41.90 |
| 4 × 400 metres relay | Venezuela; Dany Núñez; Simoncito Silvera; Jonathan Palma; William Hernández | 3:16.77 | Chile; Sebastián Cantuarias; Javier Cavagnaro; Sebastián Martínez; Guillermo Mayer | 3:17.72 | Argentina; Leandro Peyrano; Florentino Correas; Sebastián Gesualdo; Facundo Aranguren | 3:25.78 |

=== Women ===
| Event | Gold | | Silver | | Bronze | |
|---|---|---|---|---|---|---|
| 100 metres | Thatiana Ignácio (BRA) | 11.89 | Luciana Lazet (ARG) | 12.11 | Wilmary Álvarez (VEN) | 12.13 |
| 200 metres | Norma González (COL) | 24.23w | Luciana Lazet (ARG) | 24.46w | Wilmary Álvarez (VEN) | 24.66w |
| 400 metres | Amanda Dias (BRA) | 55.05 | Yusmelys García (VEN) | 55.50 | Perla dos Santos (BRA) | 55.58 |
| 800 metres | Jenny Mejías (VEN) | 2:08.47 | Juliana de Azevedo (BRA) | 2:08.54 | Ana Cláudia Coimbra (BRA) | 2:10.08 |
| 1500 metres | Ana Cláudia Coimbra (BRA) | 4:41.19 | Mónica Amboya (ECU) | 4:43.20 | María de los Ángeles (ARG) | 4:47.14 |
| 3000 metres | Lucélia Peres (BRA) | 9:31.10 | Tatiane Sá (BRA) | 9:59.22 | Elena Arias (ECU) | 10:11.51 |
| 5000 metres | Lucélia Peres (BRA) | 17:23.18 | Sara Nivicela (ECU) | 17:50.13 | Alexandra Cedeño (ECU) | 18:01.25 |
| 3000 metres steeplechase | Valquíria dos Santos (BRA) | 10:45.09 | Mónica Amboya (ECU) | 10:54.74 | Patrícia Lobo (BRA) | 10:59.03 |
| 100 metres hurdles | Maíla Machado (BRA) | 14.00 | Sira Córdoba (COL) | 14.17 | Francisca Guzmán (CHI) | 14.35 |
| 400 metres hurdles | Sira Córdoba (COL) | NTT | Perla dos Santos (BRA) | NTT | Yusmelys García (VEN) | NTT |
| High jump | Jorgelina Rodríguez (ARG) | 1.82 | Jailma de Lima (BRA) | 1.71 | Kerstin Weiss (CHI) | 1.71 |
| Pole vault | Fabiana Murer (BRA) | 3.75 | Aliusha Díaz (URU) | 3.70 | Alina Alló (ARG) | 3.50 |
| Long jump | Laurice Félix (BRA) | 6.03w | Jennifer Arveláez (VEN) | 5.95w | Fernanda Gonçalves (BRA) | 5.90 |
| Triple jump | Keila Costa (BRA) | 13.65w | Jennifer Arveláez (VEN) | 13.36 | Fernanda Delfino (BRA) | 12.74w |
| Shot put | Fernanda Resende (BRA) | 15.02 | Yanira Hurtado (VEN) | 13.82 | Márcia Souza (BRA) | 13.18 |
| Discus throw | Fernanda Resende (BRA) | 46.64 | María Cubillán (VEN) | 44.49 | Renata de Figueirêdo (BRA) | 42.19 |
| Hammer throw | Jennifer Dahlgren (ARG) | 54.95 | Dubraska Rodríguez (VEN) | 54.72 | María Mercedes Melogno (URU) | 51.00 |
| Javelin throw | Jurema César (BRA) | 48.52 | María González (VEN) | 46.76 | Leryn Franco (PAR) | 46.50 |
| Heptathlon | Valeria Steffens (CHI) | 5064 | Katiusca Venâncio (BRA) | 4829 | Patricia Cavanna (ARG) | 4559 |
| 10,000 metres track walk | Ariana Quino (BOL) | 51:32.57 | Lizbeth Zúñiga (PER) | 52:41.62 | Marcela Pacheco (CHI) | 52:47.83 |
| 4 × 100 metres relay | Venezuela; Jennifer Arveláez; Sandrine Legenort; Osmaira Sequea; Wilmary Álvarez | 46.87 | Chile; Fabiola Hecht; María José Echeverría; Daniela Pávez; Pilar Fuenzalida | 46.95 | Brazil; Maíla Paula Machado; Evelyn dos Santos; Monica de Freitas; Thatiana Ignâcio | 47.39 |
| 4 × 400 metres relay | Brazil; Francinete Araujo; Lucimar Teodoro; Juliana de Azevedo; Amanda Dias | 3:42.99 | Venezuela; Jenny Mejías; Yusmelys García; Osmaira Sequea; Osmaira Sequea | 3:45.48 | Argentina; Laura Torrecilla; Jorgelina Rodríguez; Cristina Ferrarini; Maria Gaite | 3:50.34 |

== Medal table (unofficial) ==
* Host nation (Brazil)

| Rank | Nation | Gold | Silver | Bronze | Total |
|---|---|---|---|---|---|
| 1 | Brazil* | 22 | 9 | 18 | 49 |
| 2 | Venezuela | 7 | 15 | 4 | 26 |
| 3 | Argentina | 6 | 5 | 9 | 20 |
| 4 | Chile | 4 | 5 | 7 | 16 |
| 5 | Colombia | 3 | 1 | 2 | 6 |
| 6 | Ecuador | 1 | 4 | 2 | 7 |
| 7 | Bolivia | 1 | 0 | 0 | 1 |
| 8 | Paraguay | 0 | 2 | 1 | 3 |
| 9 | Peru | 0 | 2 | 0 | 2 |
| 10 | Uruguay | 0 | 1 | 1 | 2 |
| Totals (10 entries) | | 44 | 44 | 44 | 132 |

== Final scoring per countries ==
Final scoring per countries were published.

=== Overall ===
The host country is highlighted in lavender blue

| Rank | Nation | Points |
|---|---|---|
| 1 | Brazil | 436 |
| 2 | Argentina | 232 |
| 3 | Venezuela | 227 |
| 4 | Chile | 173 |
| 5 | Ecuador | 67 |
| 6 | Colombia | 58 |
| 7 | Paraguay | 30 |
| 8 | Uruguay | 21 |
| 9 | Bolivia | 11 |
| 10 | Peru | 7 |
| 11 | Panama | 4 |

=== Men ===
The host country is highlighted in lavender blue

| Rank | Nation | Points |
|---|---|---|
| 1 | Brazil | 196 |
| 2 | Argentina | 125 |
| 3 | Venezuela | 117 |
| 4 | Chile | 114 |
| 5 | Colombia | 30 |
| 6 | Paraguay | 20 |
| 7 | Ecuador | 17 |
| 8 | Uruguay | 11 |
| 9 | Panama | 3 |

=== Women ===
The host country is highlighted in lavender blue

| Rank | Nation | Points |
|---|---|---|
| 1 | Brazil | 240 |
| 2 | Venezuela | 110 |
| 3 | Argentina | 107 |
| 4 | Chile | 69 |
| 5 | Ecuador | 50 |
| 6 | Colombia | 28 |
| 7 | Bolivia | 11 |
| 8 | Paraguay | 8 |
| 8 | Uruguay | 8 |
| 10 | Peru | 7 |
| 11 | Panama | 1 |
