= Digna Luz Murillo =

Colombian sprinter

Personal information
- Born: May 22, 1981 (age 45) Carepa, Antioquia, Colombia

Sport
- Country: Spain
- Sport: Athletics

Achievements and titles
- Olympic finals: 2000, 2004
- Personal best: 100m 11.35, 200m 22.98, 60m 7.31
Medal record
Representing Colombia
Central American and Caribbean Games
Gold medal – first place	2002 San Salvador	4x100m relay
- Updated on 13 August 2016

Digna Luz Murillo Moreno (born 22 May 1981 in Carepa, Antioquia, Colombia) is a Colombian-Spanish athlete competing in the sprinting events. She changed allegiance from her native Colombia in 2009. She competed for her original country at the 2000 and 2004 Summer Olympics.

== Competition record ==
Year	Competition	Venue	Position	Event	Notes
Representing Colombia
1999	Pan American Junior Championships	Tampa, United States	8th	100 m	12.21
1999	Pan American Junior Championships	Tampa, United States	8th	200 m	24.62
1999	Pan American Junior Championships	Tampa, United States	4th	4 × 100 m	46.17
1999	South American Junior Championships	Concepción, Chile	1st	100 m	11.71
1999	South American Junior Championships	Concepción, Chile	2nd	200 m	24.10
1999	South American Junior Championships	Concepción, Chile	1st	4 × 100 m	45.87
2000	Ibero-American Championships	Rio de Janeiro, Brazil	11th (h)	100 m	12.28
2000	Olympic Games	Sydney, Australia	16th (h)	4 × 100 m	44.08
2001	South American Championships	Manaus, Brazil	4th	100 m	11.80
2001	South American Championships	Manaus, Brazil	7th	200 m	25.64
2001	South American Championships	Manaus, Brazil	2nd	4 × 100 m	45.43
2002	Central American and Caribbean Games	San Salvador, El Salvador	1st	4 × 100 m relay	45.34
2003	South American Championships	Barquisimeto, Venezuela	1st	100 m	11.35
2003	South American Championships	Barquisimeto, Venezuela	1st	200 m	23.13
2003	South American Championships	Barquisimeto, Venezuela	2nd	4 × 100 m	44.67
2003	Pan American Games	Santo Domingo, Dominican Republic	9th (h)	100 m	11.74
2003	Pan American Games	Santo Domingo, Dominican Republic	4th	200 m	23.26
2003	Pan American Games	Santo Domingo, Dominican Republic	5th	4 × 100 m	45.13
2004	Ibero-American Championships	Huelva, Spain	2nd	100 m	11.41
2004	Ibero-American Championships	Huelva, Spain	2nd	4 × 100 m	43.79
2004	Olympic Games	Athens, Greece	18th (qf)	200 m	23.19
2004	Olympic Games	Athens, Greece	10th (h)	4 × 100 m	43.30
Representing Spain
2010	World Indoor Championships	Doha, Qatar	12th (sf)	60 m	7.33
2010	Ibero-American Championships	San Fernando, Spain	3rd	100 m	11.49
2010	Ibero-American Championships	San Fernando, Spain	3rd	4 × 100 m	44.38
2010	European Championships	Barcelona, Spain	15th (sf)	100 m	11.44
2010	European Championships	Barcelona, Spain	6th	4 × 100 m	43.45
2011	European Indoor Championships	Paris, France	15th (sf)	60 m	7.36

== Personal bests ==
Outdoor

- 100 metres – 11.35 (+0.2 m/s) (Barquisimeto 2003)
- 200 metres – 22.98 (+1.4 m/s) (Athens 2004)

Indoor

- 60 metres – 7.31 (Valencia 2011)
