= Virgil Hodge =

Saint Kitts and Nevis sprinter (born 1983)

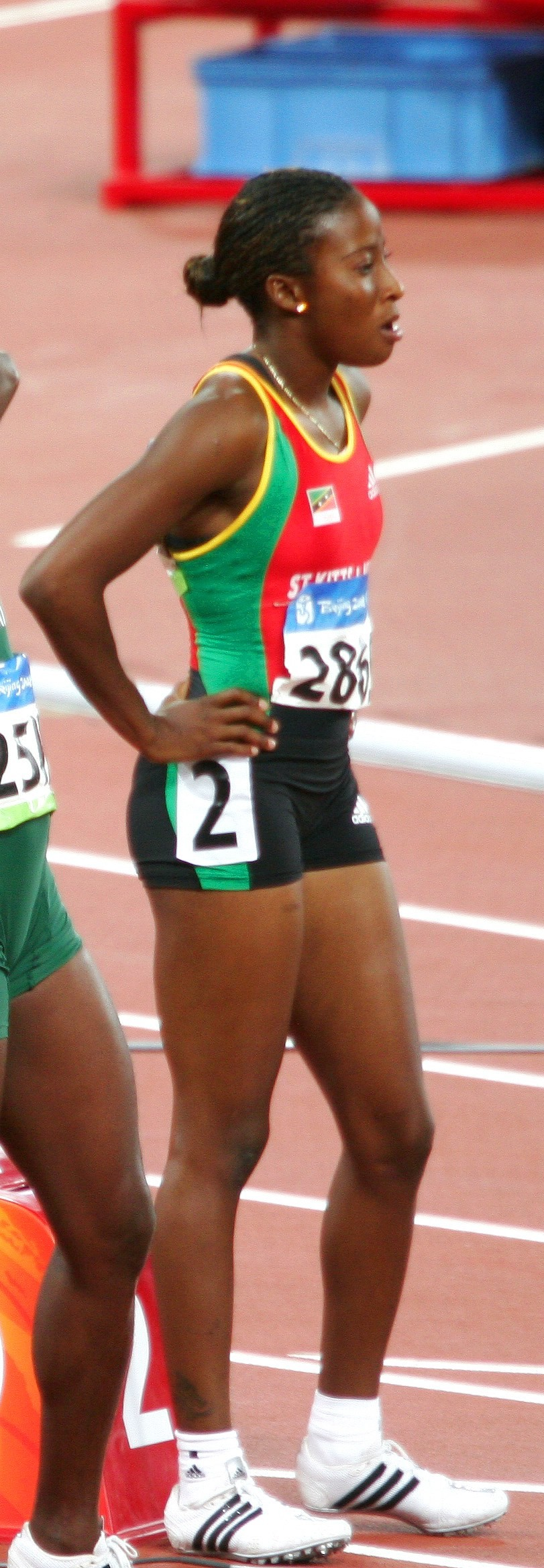
- Virgil Hodge at the 2008 Summer Olympics

Personal information
- Born: 17 November 1983 (age 42) Basseterre, Saint Kitts and Nevis

Sport
- Sport: Track and field
Medal record
Athletics
Representing Saint Kitts and Nevis
Central American and Caribbean Games
Silver medal – second place	2006 Cartagena	200m
Bronze medal – third place	2006 Cartagena	100m
Bronze medal – third place	2010 Mayaguez	4x100 m relay
CAC Junior Championships (U20)
Bronze medal – third place	2002 Bridgetown	4x100 m relay

Virgil Hodge (born 17 November 1983) is a sprinter from Saint Kitts and Nevis who specializes in the 200 metres. She was born in Basseterre.

At the 2008 Summer Olympics in Beijing she competed at the 100 metres sprint. In her first round heat she placed fourth behind Muna Lee, Anita Pistone and Guzel Khubbieva, normally causing elimination. However her time of 11.48 was among the ten fastest losing times, which was enough to advance to the second round. There she failed to qualify for the semi-finals as her time of 11.45 was the fourth time of her heat.

While a junior in high school, Hodge fell and suffered a back injury. She was told she wouldn't ever be able to run again, but she was eventually cleared to compete after a year of rehabilitation.

She is a graduate of Texas Christian University where she was called the most decorated female athlete in TCU Horned Frogs history. She was a six-time All-American for the TCU Horned Frogs track and field team, finishing 5th in the 200 metres at the 2007 NCAA Division I Outdoor Track and Field Championships.

== Achievements ==
Year	Competition	Venue	Position	Event	Notes
Representing Saint Kitts and Nevis
2000	Central American and Caribbean Junior Championships (U-20)	San Juan, Puerto Rico	7th	100 m	12.31 (1.2 m/s)
2002	CARIFTA Games (U20)	Nassau, Bahamas	5th	100 m	11.99
2002	CARIFTA Games (U20)	Nassau, Bahamas	6th	200 m	24.80
2002	Central American and Caribbean Junior Championships (U-20)	Bridgetown, Barbados	5th	100 m	11.87 (0.0 m/s)
2002	Central American and Caribbean Junior Championships (U-20)	Bridgetown, Barbados	4th	200 m	24.29 (-0.9 m/s)
2002	Central American and Caribbean Junior Championships (U-20)	Bridgetown, Barbados	3rd	4 × 100 m relay	46.65
2002	World Junior Championships	Kingston, Jamaica	15th (sf)	100m	11.94 (wind: +0.7 m/s)
2002	World Junior Championships	Kingston, Jamaica	—	200m	DQ
2002	World Junior Championships	Kingston, Jamaica	9th (h)	4 × 100 m relay	46.14
2003	Central American and Caribbean Championships	St. George's, Grenada	11th (h)	100 m	11.82
2003	Pan American Games	Santo Domingo, Dominican Republic	10th (h)	200 m	23.85
2003	World Championships	Paris, France	35th (h)	200 m	24.17
2004	South American U23 Championships	Barquisimeto, Venezuela	2nd (h)	100m	11.85 (wind: 0.0 m/s)
2004	South American U23 Championships	Barquisimeto, Venezuela	4th	4 × 100 m relay	45.46
2005	Central American and Caribbean Championships	Nassau, Bahamas	6th (h)	100 m	11.43
2005	Central American and Caribbean Championships	Nassau, Bahamas	–	4 × 100 m relay	DNF
2006	Central American and Caribbean Games	Cartagena, Colombia	3rd	100 m	11.52
2006	Central American and Caribbean Games	Cartagena, Colombia	2nd	200 m	23.09
2006	Central American and Caribbean Games	Cartagena, Colombia	5th	4 × 100 m relay	45.06
2007	Pan American Games	Rio, Brazil	6th	100 m	11.40 (0.8 m/s)
2007	Pan American Games	Rio, Brazil	4th	200 m	23.05 (-0.6 m/s)
2007	Pan American Games	Rio, Brazil	5th	4 × 100 m relay	44.14
2007	NACAC Championships	San Salvador, El Salvador	6th	100 m	11.63
2007	NACAC Championships	San Salvador, El Salvador	1st	200 m	22.73
2007	NACAC Championships	San Salvador, El Salvador	5th	4 × 100 m relay	45.15
2007	World Championships	Osaka, Japan	13th (sf)	200 m	23.06
2008	Olympic Games	Beijing, China	23rd (qf)	100 m	11.45
2008	Olympic Games	Beijing, China	19th (qf)	200 m	23.17
2009	Central American and Caribbean Championships	Havana, Cuba	1st	200 m	23.41
2009	Central American and Caribbean Championships	Havana, Cuba	1st	4 × 100 m relay	43.53 NR
2009	World Championships	Berlin, Germany	24th (qf)	100 m	11.51
2009	World Championships	Berlin, Germany	16th (sf)	200 m	23.19
2009	World Championships	Berlin, Germany	11th (h)	4 × 100 m relay	43.98
2010	World Indoor Championships	Doha, Qatar	27th (h)	60 m	7.61
2011	Central American and Caribbean Championships	Havana, Cuba	9th (h)	100 m	11.79
2011	Central American and Caribbean Championships	Havana, Cuba	14th (h)	200 m	24.28
2015	NACAC Championships	San José, Costa Rica	6th (sf)	100m	11.62 (wind: +1.2 m/s)

=== Personal bests ===
- 100 metres - 11.29 s (2007) - national record.
- 200 metres - 22.68 s (2007) - national record.
