= Danielle Browning =

Jamaican sprinter (born 1981)

Personal information
- Born: 29 August 1981 (age 44)

Sport
- Sport: Track and field
Medal record
Women's athletics
Representing Jamaica
World Championships
Silver medal – second place	2005 Helsinki	4x100 m relay
Commonwealth Games
Gold medal – first place	2006 Melbourne	4x100m relay
Pan American Games
Bronze medal – third place	2003 Santo Domingo	4x100m relay
CAC Junior Championships (U20)
Gold medal – first place	1998 George Town	4x100 m relay
Bronze medal – third place	1998 George Town	200 m

Danielle Browning (born 29 August 1981) is a retired female track and field sprinter from Jamaica, who specialized in the 200 metres. Her personal best time was 23.21 seconds, achieved in August 2003 in Santo Domingo. She had 11.42 in the 100 metres, achieved in June 2005 in Kingston, Jamaica.

At the 2003 Pan American Games she finished sixth in the 200 metres and won a bronze medal in the 4x100 metre relay. She competed at the 2006 Commonwealth Games without reaching the final.

Browning competed for the Essex Wolverines track and field and Auburn Tigers track and field teams in the NCAA. She later transitioned to bobsledding.

== Achievements ==
Year	Competition	Venue	Position	Event	Notes
Representing Jamaica
2003	Pan American Games	Santo Domingo, Dominican Republic	6th	200 m	
2003	Pan American Games	Santo Domingo, Dominican Republic	3rd	4 × 100 m relay	

== Personal bests ==
- 100 metres – 11.42 (2005)
- 200 metres – 23.21 (2003)
