= Frank García =

Dominican poet and LGBTQ rights activist

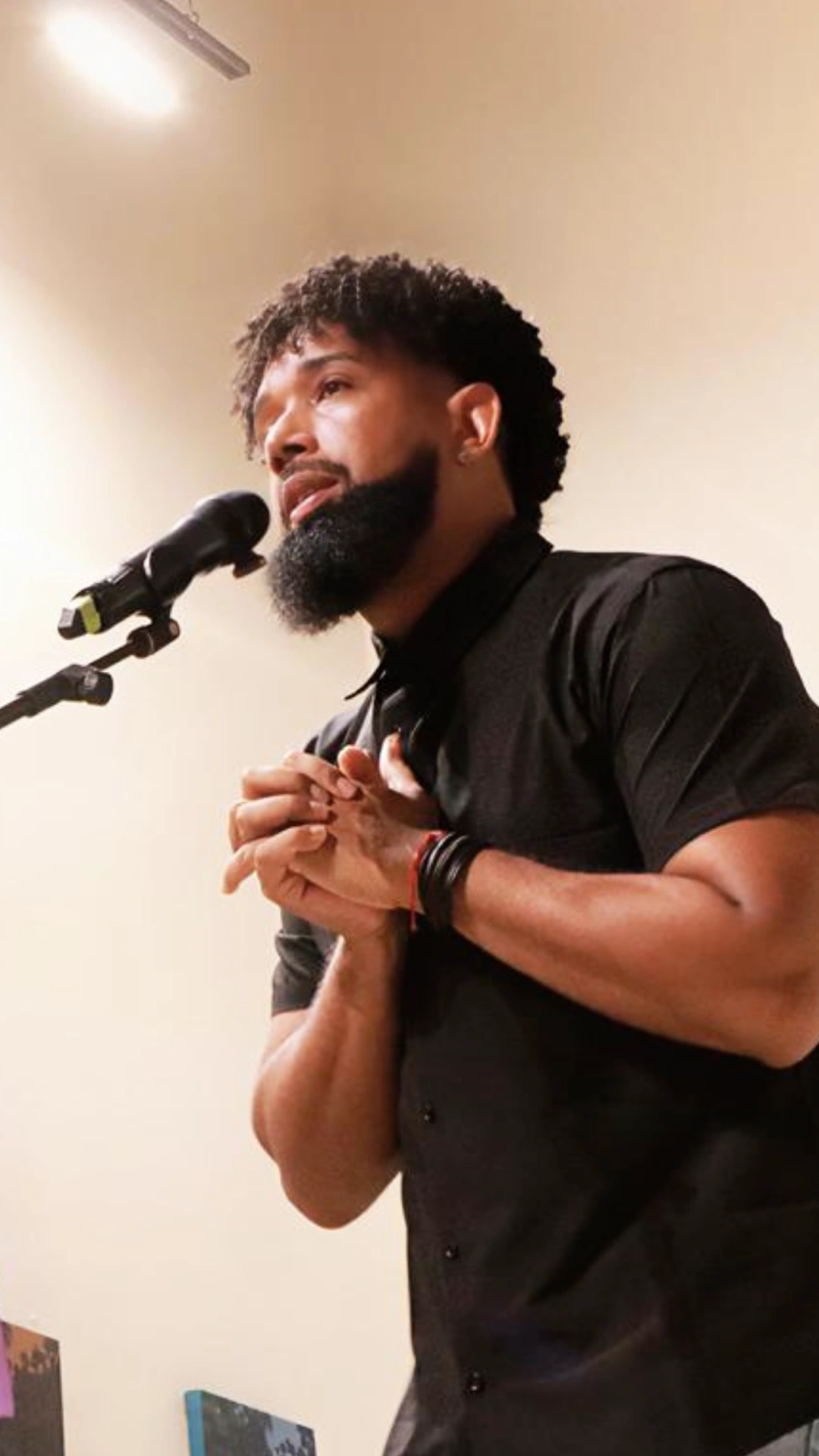
Frank García in 2024

Frank García (born 1982) is a Dominican poet, psychologist, musician, and LGBT activist.

== Biography ==
As a child, his family wanted him to become a professional football player. However, García never felt comfortable in sports due to bullying by other boys who mocked his gestures, which they labeled as effeminate. During this time, García hid his homosexuality and pretended to be heterosexual, but later came out.

At age 20, he founded the rock band Naciones Ciegas, where he served as lead singer and songwriter.

He began writing after moving to the city of Santo Domingo. In 2022, he published his poetry book *Lo que escribí mientras esperabas en una habitación vacía* (What I Wrote While You Waited in an Empty Room), through Río de Oro Editores. In the work, García explored, among other themes, the nature of Dominican society as affectionate, yet still hostile toward LGBT people.

In 2024, he published his second poetry collection, *Flotando sobre las cañas* (Floating Over the Canes), which García described as a more conceptual book than his first. That same year, he was also part of the Dominican poetry anthology *Voces eternas* (Eternal Voices).

== Works ==
Poetry Collections

- *Lo que escribí mientras esperabas en una habitación vacía* (2022)
- *Flotando sobre las cañas* (2024)

== See also ==
LGBTQ people
