= Roxana Díaz (athlete) =

Cuban sprinter (born 1981)

Personal information
- Full name: Roxana Tomasa Díaz Sánchez
- Born: 17 May 1981 (age 45) Melena del Sur, Mayabeque, Cuba
- Height: 1.69 m (5 ft 7 in)
- Weight: 65 kg (143 lb)

Sport
- Country: Cuba
- Sport: Athletics
Medal record
Representing Cuba
Pan American Games
Gold medal – first place	2003 Santo Domingo	200m
Gold medal – first place	2007 Rio de Janeiro	200m
Silver medal – second place	2003 Santo Domingo	4x100m relay
Bronze medal – third place	2007 Rio de Janeiro	4x100m relay
Central American and Caribbean Games
Gold medal – first place	2006 Cartagena	200m
Gold medal – first place	2006 Cartagena	4x100m relay
- Updated on 7 June 2013

Roxana Tomasa Díaz Sánchez (born 17 May 1981) is a Cuban former track and field sprinter.

== Career ==
Her personal best in the women's 200 metres is 22.68, achieved on July 4, 2007, at a meet in Salamanca. Díaz is a two-time Olympian (2004 and 2008).

== Personal best ==
Outdoor

- 100 m: 11.31 s A (wind: +1.5 m/s) – Guatemala City, Guatemala, 11 May 2002
- 200 m: 22.68 s (wind: +0.7 m/s) – Salamanca, Spain, 4 July 2007
- 400 m: 52.09 s – Alcalá de Henares, Spain, 12 July 2008

Indoor

- 60 m: 7.30 s – Athens, Greece, 6 March 2003

== Achievements ==
Year	Competition	Venue	Position	Event	Notes
Representing Cuba
1997	Pan American Junior Championships	Havana, Cuba	3rd (h)	100 m	12.11 s (wind: -2.9 m/s)
1997	Pan American Junior Championships	Havana, Cuba	4th	4 × 100 m	45.75 s
2002	Ibero-American Championships	Guatemala City, Guatemala	1st	100 m	11.32 s (wind: +2.3 m/s) w A
2002	Ibero-American Championships	Guatemala City, Guatemala	2nd	200 m	23.00 s (wind: +2.7 m/s) w A
2003	World Indoor Championships	Birmingham, United Kingdom	11th (h)	200 m	DQ
2003	Central American and Caribbean Championships	St George's, Grenada	2nd	200 m	22.74 s (wind: +0.2 m/s)
2003	Central American and Caribbean Championships	St George's, Grenada	3rd	4 × 100 m	43.83 s
2003	Pan American Games	Santo Domingo, Dominican Republic	1st	200 m	22.69 s (wind: +1.3 m/s)
2003	Pan American Games	Santo Domingo, Dominican Republic	2nd	4 × 100 m	43.40 s
2003	World Championships	Saint-Denis, France	13th (sf)	200 m	23.12 s (wind: -0.1 m/s)
2003	World Championships	Saint-Denis, France	10th (h)	4 × 100 m	43.82 s
2004	Ibero-American Championships	Huelva, Spain	1st	200 m	23.73 s (wind: -1.6 m/s)
2004	Ibero-American Championships	Huelva, Spain	1st	4 × 100 m	43.66 s
2004	Olympic Games	Athens, Greece	11th (h)	4 × 100 m	43.60 s
2005	ALBA Games	Havana, Cuba	1st	100 m	11.53 s (wind: +0.1 m/s)
2005	ALBA Games	Havana, Cuba	1st	200 m	23.34 s (wind: +0.0 m/s)
2005	Central American and Caribbean Championships	Nassau, Bahamas	5th	200 m	23.14 s (wind: +3.8 m/s) w
2005	Central American and Caribbean Championships	Nassau, Bahamas	3rd	4 × 100 m	45.07 s
2006	Central American and Caribbean Games	Cartagena, Colombia	1st	200 m	22.76 s (wind: -0.4 m/s)
2006	Central American and Caribbean Games	Cartagena, Colombia	1st	4 × 100 m	43.29 s
2007	ALBA Games	Caracas, Venezuela	1st	200 m	22.98 s (wind: +1.9 m/s)
2007	ALBA Games	Caracas, Venezuela	1st	4 × 100 m	43.86 s
2007	Pan American Games	Rio de Janeiro, Brazil	1st	200 m	22.90 s (wind: -0.6 m/s)
2007	Pan American Games	Rio de Janeiro, Brazil	3rd	4 × 100 m	43.62 s
2007	World Championships	Osaka, Japan	11th (sf)	200 m	22.98 s (wind: -0.4 m/s)
2007	World Championships	Osaka, Japan	–	4 × 100 m	DQ
2008	Central American and Caribbean Championships	Cali, Colombia	2nd	200 m	22.82 s (wind: +0.3 m/s)
2008	Olympic Games	Beijing, China	15th (sf)	200 m	23.12 s (wind: +0.0 m/s)
2008	Olympic Games	Beijing, China	6th	4 × 400 m	3:23.21 min
2009	ALBA Games	Havana, Cuba	1st	200 m	23.31 s (wind: +0.7 m/s)
2009	Central American and Caribbean Championships	Havana, Cuba	2nd	200 m	23.56 s (wind: -1.2 m/s)
2009	Central American and Caribbean Championships	Havana, Cuba	1st	4 × 400 m	3:29.94 min
2010	Ibero-American Championships	San Fernando, Spain	2nd	200 m	23.25 s (wind: +0.5 m/s)
2010	Ibero-American Championships	San Fernando, Spain	1st	4 × 400 m	3:30.73 min
2011	Pan American Games	Guadalajara, Mexico	6th	200 m	23.45 s (wind: +0.5 m/s) A
2011	Pan American Games	Guadalajara, Mexico	4th	4 × 100 m	43.97 s A
