= 2004 Ibero-American Championships in Athletics =

XI Ibero-American Championships
- Dates: 6 – 8 August
- Host city: Huelva, Spain
- Venue: Estadio Iberoamericano
- Events: 44
- Participation: 443 athletes from 27 nations
- Records set: 16 Championship records

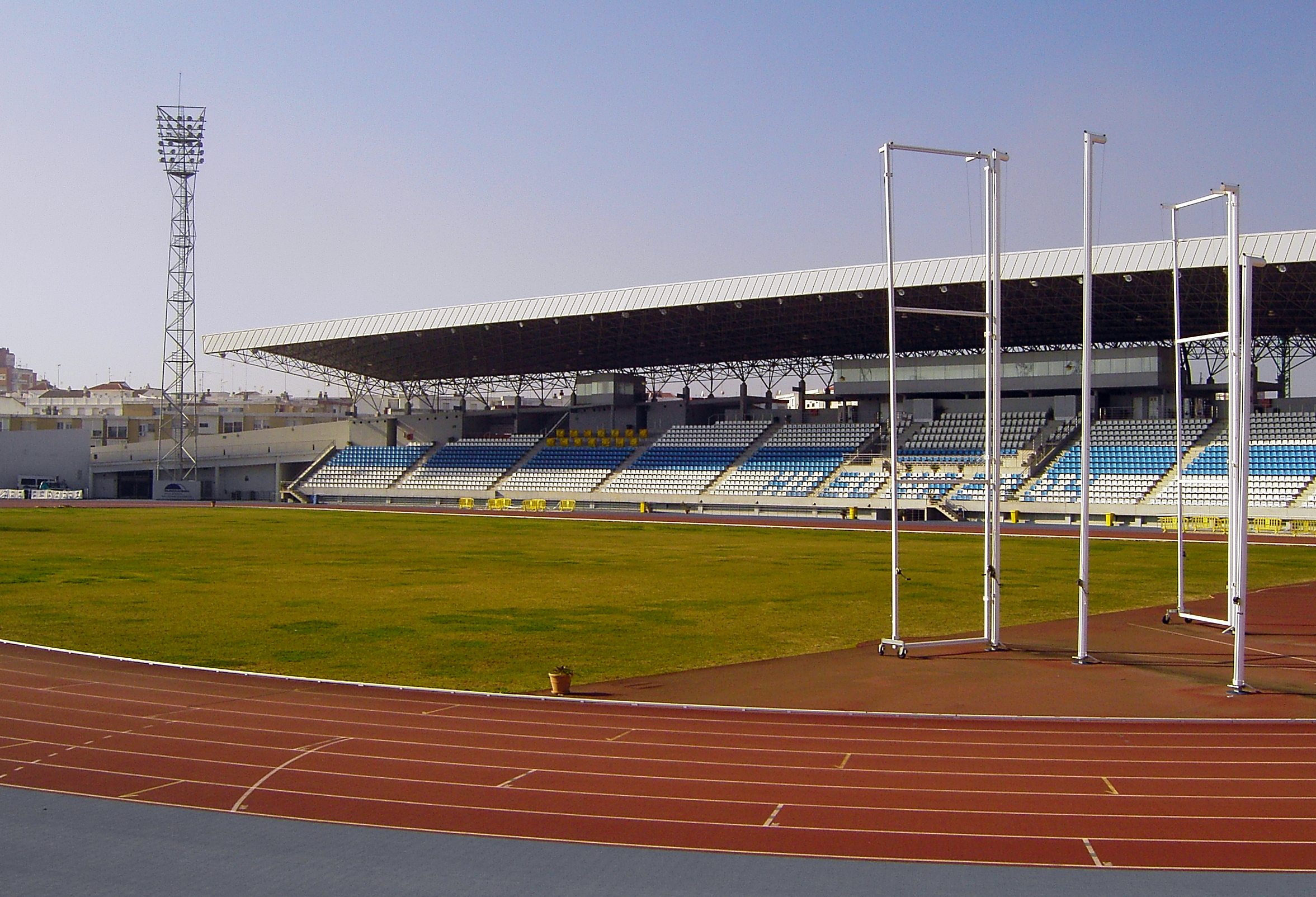
The host stadium in Huelva

The 2004 Ibero-American Championships in Athletics (Spanish: XI Campeonato Iberoamericano de Atletismo) was the eleventh edition of the international athletics competition between Ibero-American nations which was held at the Estadio Iberoamericano in Huelva, Spain on 6–8 August 2004. A record high of 27 nations took part while the number of participating athletes (430) was the second highest in the competition's history after the 1992 edition. The programme featured 44 track and field events, 22 each for men and women, and 16 championship records were broken or equalled at the three-day competition.

The host stadium was built specifically for the championships and it was the first major event to be held there. An opening ceremony was held outside the stadium at La Rábida (the monastery where Christopher Columbus stayed and successfully proposed his voyage to the Indies, which led to the Discovery of the Americas). High participation was attributed to the competition's proximity to the 2004 Summer Olympics, which was held in Athens two weeks later. The legacy of the championships is found in the Meeting Iberoamericano de Atletismo, an annual track and field meeting which is held at the same stadium.

The host nation, Spain, topped the medal table with 16 gold medals and 38 medals overall. Cuba (typically strong at the meeting) came second with fourteen gold medals and 22 medals overall. Brazil came third, producing six event winners, but had the second highest medal haul with a total of 23 medallists. Spain sent the largest delegation, entering 90 athletes, while Brazil (63), Portugal (51) and Cuba (33) were the next most numerous teams.

A number of medallists went on to have Olympic success. Joan Lino Martínez, winner in the men's long jump, took an Olympic bronze medal. Cuba's female throwers performed well in Athens: Yumileidi Cumbá and Osleidys Menéndez were crowned Olympic champions, while Yipsi Moreno and Yunaika Crawford both reached the podium in the hammer throw. Fernanda Ribeiro, a 1996 Olympic champion, won the women's 5000 metres in Huelva, but retired in the Olympic final due to injuries.

== Medal summary ==
=== Men ===
Event	Gold		Silver		Bronze	
100 metres	Vicente de Lima (BRA)	10.15	André da Silva (BRA)	10.21	Juan Sainfleur (DOM)	10.28
200 metres (Wind: -4.3 m/s)	Juan Pedro Toledo (MEX)	20.84	Bruno Pacheco (BRA)	20.93	Heber Viera (URU)	21.30
400 metres	Carlos Santa (DOM)	45.05	Yeimer López (CUB)	45.21	Alejandro Cárdenas (MEX)	45.22
800 metres	José Manuel Cortés (ESP)	1:46.51	Salvador Crespo (ESP)	1:46.78	Simoncito Silvera (VEN)	1:47.26
1500 metres	Sergio Gallardo (ESP)	3:37.34 CR	Hudson de Souza (BRA)	3:37.66	Arturo Casado (ESP)	3:40.30
3000 metres	Hudson de Souza (BRA)	7:51.25 CR	Carles Castillejo (ESP)	7:51.26	António Travassos (POR)	7:57.23
5000 metres	Jesús España (ESP)	13:48.09	Freddy González (VEN)	13:49.05	Juan Carlos de la Ossa (ESP)	13:52.15
110 m hurdles	Yoel Hernández (CUB)	13.49	Matheus Facho Inocêncio (BRA)	13.52	Jackson Quiñónez (ECU)	13.61
400 m hurdles	Eduardo Iván Rodríguez (ESP)	49.08	Edivaldo Monteiro (POR)	49.31	José María Romera (ESP)	49.92
3000 m steeplechase	César Pérez (ESP)	8:30.83	Mário Teixeira (POR)	8:33.26	Fernando Fernandes (BRA)	8:35.92
4×100 m relay	Brazil (BRA); Cláudio Roberto Souza; Jarbas Mascarenhas Jr. Vicente de Lima; André da Silva	38.62	Spain (ESP); Alberto Dorrego; Santiago Ezquerro; Iván Mocholí; Ángel David Rodríguez	39.70	Venezuela (VEN); Juan Morcillo; Jonathan Omar Medina; José Carabalí; Hely Ollarves	39.91
4×400 m relay	Spain (ESP); Eduardo Iván Rodríguez; Antonio Manuel Reina; Luis Flores; David Testa	3:05.68	Brazil (BRA); Bruno Pacheco; Valdinei da Silva; Wagner dos Santos; Anderson Jorge dos Santos	3:06.19	Venezuela (VEN); William José Hernández; Simoncito Silvera; José Faneite; Jonathan Palma	3:10.41
20,000 m track walk	Cristián Berdeja (ECU)	1:24:30.2	José Alessandro Bagio (BRA)	1:25:13.1	Freddy Hernández (COL)	1:26:16.7
High jump	Lisvany Pérez (CUB)	2.24 m	Jessé de Lima (BRA)	2.21 m	Alfredo Deza (PER)	2.21 m
Pole vault	Fábio da Silva (BRA)	5.40 m	Giovanni Lanaro (MEX)	5.35 m	Germán Chiaraviglio (ARG) Roger Noguera (ESP)	5.30 m
Long jump	Joan Lino Martínez (ESP)	8.26 m	Víctor Castillo (VEN)	7.95 m	Iván Pedroso (CUB)	7.78 m
Triple jump	Arnie David Giralt (CUB)	17.12 m CR	Yoel García (CUB)	16.59 m	Jefferson Sabino (BRA)	16.16 m
Shot put	Manuel Martínez (ESP)	20.59 m CR	Marco Antonio Verni (CHI)	20.17 m	Ronny Jiménez (VEN)	18.72 m
Discus throw	Mario Pestano (ESP)	63.84 m	Loy Martínez (CUB)	62.08 m	Jorge Balliengo (ARG)	59.24 m
Hammer throw	Juan Cerra (ARG)	73.34 m	Moisés Campeny (ESP)	71.01 m	Adrián Marzo (ARG)	67.89 m
Javelin throw	Isbel Luaces (CUB)	77.98 m	Emeterio González (CUB)	76.34 m	Noraldo Palacios (COL)	76.00 m
Decathlon	David Gómez (ESP)	7940 pts CR	Enrique Aguirre (ARG)	7703 pts	Oscar González (ESP)	7560 pts

=== Women ===
Event	Gold		Silver		Bronze	
100 metres	Virgen Benavides (CUB)	11.33	Digna Luz Murillo (COL)	11.41	Lucimar de Moura (BRA)	11.45
200 metres	Roxana Díaz (CUB)	23.73	Felipa Palacios (COL)	23.77	Rosemar Coelho (BRA)	23.83
400 metres	Maria Laura Almirao (BRA)	52.13	Mayra González (MEX)	52.22	Geisa Coutinho (BRA)	52.42
800 metres	Zulia Calatayud (CUB)	2:01.30	Mayte Martínez (ESP)	2:01.39	Sandra Teixeira (POR)	2:02.44
1500 metres	Irene Alfonso (ESP)	4:14.80	Eva Arias (ESP)	4:16.61	Jéssica Augusto (POR)	4:18.14
3000 metres	Jéssica Augusto (POR)	9:02.36	Jacqueline Martín (ESP)	9:03.64	Mónica Rosa (POR)	9:08.74
5000 metres	Fernanda Ribeiro (POR)	15:27.53 CR	María Luisa Larraga (ESP)	15:32.29	Zulema Fuentes-Pila (ESP)	15:56.80
100 m hurdles (Wind: -2.1 m/s)	Aliuska López (ESP)	13.25	Maíla Machado (BRA)	13.42	Princesa Oliveros (COL)	13.72
400 m hurdles	Daimí Pernía (CUB)	54.84 CR	Lucimar Teodoro (BRA)	56.10	Yvonne Harrison (PUR)	56.10
3000 m steeplechase	Anália Rosa (POR)	9:49.06 CR	Clarisse Cruz (POR)	9:55.24	Yamilka González (ESP)	9:56.22
4×100 m relay	Cuba (CUB); Dainelky Pérez; Roxana Díaz; Ana Wilianis López; Virgen Benavides	43.66 CR	Colombia (COL); Melissa Murillo; Felipa Palacios; Darlenys Obregón; Digna Luz Murillo	43.79	Brazil (BRA); Kátia Regina Santos; Lucimar de Moura; Rosemar Coelho Neto; Luciana dos Santos	44.13
4×400 m relay	Brazil (BRA); Geisa Coutinho; Josiane Tito; Lucimar Teodoro; Maria Laura Almirao	3:28.60 CR	Spain (ESP); Julia Alba; Miriam Bravo; Catalina Oliver; Cora Olivero	3:32.00	Colombia (COL); Norma González; Felipa Palacios; Darlenys Obregón; Rosibel García	3:33.95
10,000 m track walk	Rocío Florido (ESP)	44:22.00 CR	Ana Cabecinha (POR)	44:33.75	Carolina Jiménez (ESP)	44:43.58
High jump	Romary Rifka (MEX)	1.94 m	Marta Mendía (ESP)	1.94 m	Catherine Ibargüen (COL)	1.88 m
Pole vault	Naroa Agirre (ESP)	4.30 m CR=	Alejandra García (ARG)	4.30 m CR=	Milena Agudelo (COL)	4.20 m
Long jump	Niurka Montalvo (ESP)	6.58 m	Yudelkis Fernández (CUB)	6.45 m	Concepción Montaner (ESP)	6.40 m
Triple jump	Yusmay Bicet (CUB)	14.51 m CR	Carlota Castrejana (ESP)	14.35 m	Keila Costa (BRA)	13.80 m
Shot put	Yumileidi Cumbá (CUB)	19.97 m CR	Misleydis González (CUB)	18.65 m	Elisângela Adriano (BRA)	17.79 m
Discus throw	Yania Ferrales (CUB)	61.11 m	Teresa Machado (POR)	57.81 m	Alice Matejková (ESP)	57.58 m
Hammer throw	Yipsi Moreno (CUB)	71.06 m CR	Berta Castells (ESP)	64.96 m	Jennifer Dahlgren (ARG)	63.72 m
Javelin throw	Osleidys Menéndez (CUB)	66.99 m CR	Sonia Bicet (CUB)	64.71 m	Zuleima Araméndiz (COL)	56.47 m
Heptathlon	María Peinado (ESP)	5795 pts	Thaimara Rivas (VEN)	5529 pts	Carina Gomes (POR)	5165 pts

== Medal table ==
* Host nation (Spain)

Rank	Nation	Gold	Silver	Bronze	Total
1	Spain (ESP)*	16	12	10	38
2	Cuba (CUB)	14	7	1	22
3	Brazil (BRA)	6	9	8	23
4	Portugal (POR)	3	5	5	13
5	Mexico (MEX)	3	2	1	6
6	Argentina (ARG)	1	2	4	7
7	Dominican Republic (DOM)	1	0	1	2
8	Colombia (COL)	0	3	7	10
9	Venezuela (VEN)	0	3	4	7
10	Chile (CHI)	0	1	0	1
11	Ecuador (ECU)	0	0	1	1
11	Peru (PER)	0	0	1	1
11	Puerto Rico (PUR)	0	0	1	1
11	Uruguay (URU)	0	0	1	1
Totals (14 entries)		44	44	45	133

== Participation ==
Twenty-seven nations of the Asociación Iberoamericana de Atletismo sent delegations to the 2004 championships, marking a new record. This represented all the organisation's members but for Guinea-Bissau. A total of 430 athletes (443 including out of competition contestants) took part in the competition – the second highest number that it had attracted at that point, after the 1992 edition.

- Angola (10)
- Argentina (23)
- Bolivia (5)
- Brazil (60)
- Cape Verde (3)
- Chile (28)
- Colombia (24)
- Costa Rica (3)
- Cuba (31)
- Dominican Republic (7)
- Ecuador (8)
- Equatorial Guinea (2)
- Guatemala (7)
- Honduras (3)
- Mexico (23)
- Mozambique (2)
- Nicaragua (3)
- Panama (2)
- Paraguay (6)
- Peru (7)
- Portugal (51)
- Puerto Rico (13)
- El Salvador (2)
- Spain (89)
- São Tomé and Príncipe (3)
- Uruguay (7)
- Venezuela (21)
