= Jarbas Mascarenhas =

Brazilian sprinter (born 1980)

Personal information
- Born: 25 August 1980 (age 45) Rio de Janeiro, Brazil

Sport
- Sport: Track and field
Medal record
Representing Brazil
Pan American Games
Gold medal – first place	2003 Santo Domingo	4x100m relay

Jarbas Mascarenhas (born 25 August 1980) is a Brazilian sprinter that competed in the men's 100m in the 2004 Summer Olympics. In the first heat, he recorded a 10.34, which was enough to advance him to round 2. There, a 10.30 was not enough to advance further. His fastest ever time was 10.18. He was born in Rio de Janeiro.
