= Valma Bass =

Saint Kitts and Nevis sprinter (born 1974)

Personal information
- Born: 12 March 1974 (age 52)

Sport
- Sport: Track and field

Valma Bass (born 12 March 1974) is a former sprinter from Saint Kitts and Nevis who specialized in the 100 and 200 metres. She changed her sporting nationality to the United States Virgin Islands in May 2003.

== Early life ==
Residing in the United States Virgin Islands after her family had moved from Saint Kitts and Nevis, Bass attended Charlotte Amalie High School in Saint Thomas alongside her future Olympic relay partner Ameerah Bello. She attended Louisiana State University in the United States.

== Career ==
Bass competed for Saint Kitts and Nevis at the Olympic Games in 1996 and 2000 as well as the 2001 World Championships. In 2003, she formally requested permission from the International Association of Athletics Federations to switch allegiance to the United States Virgin Islands after receiving dispensation by not competing for Saint Kitts for a year, opposed to the usual three year waiting period. She later competed at the 2003 World Championships and the 2004 World Indoor Championships. At none of these occasions she reached the final. She does have an eighth-place finish from the 2006 Central American and Caribbean Games.

Her personal best times are 11.43 seconds in the 100 metres and 23.07 seconds in the 200 metres, both achieved in May 2000 in Baton Rouge. These times used to be the Saint Kitts and Nevis records, but they have been broken by Virgil Hodge. Bass still co-holds the Saint Kitts and Nevis record in 4 x 400 metres relay, which was achieved at the 1996 Olympic Games.
