= 2009 South American Championships in Athletics – Results =

These are the official results of the 2009 South American Championships in Athletics which took place on 19–21 June 2009 in Lima, Peru.

== Men's results ==
=== 100 meters ===
Heats – June 19
Wind:
Heat 1: -0.4 m/s, Heat 2: +0.3 m/s, Heat 3: -2.4 m/s

Rank	Heat	Name	Nationality	Time	Notes
1	1	Kael Becerra	Chile	10.51	Q
2	2	Alonso Edward	Panama	10.52	Q
3	1	Lee Prowell	Guyana	10.55	Q
4	1	José Carlos Moreira	Brazil	10.56	q
5	1	Jermaine Chirinos	Venezuela	10.62	q
6	3	Daniel Grueso	Colombia	10.68	Q
7	2	Franklin Nazareno	Ecuador	10.74	Q
8	3	Jurgen Themen	Suriname	10.77	
9	2	Matías Usandivaras	Argentina	10.79	
10	2	Álvaro Cassiani	Venezuela	10.82	
11	3	Miguel Wilken	Argentina	10.88	
12	2	Michael Saul	Guyana	10.90	
13	3	Luis Morán	Ecuador	11.02	
14	1	Juan Carlos Flores	Peru	11.04	
15	2	Robert Borja	Peru	11.08	
16	1	Fernando Covarrubias	Bolivia	11.30	
17	3	Javier Valenzuela	Bolivia	11.74	
	3	Jorge Célio Sena	Brazil	DQ	Doping

Final – June 20
Wind:
+0.6 m/s

Rank	Lane	Name	Nationality	Time	Notes
1st place, gold medalist(s)	5	Alonso Edward	Panama	10.29	
2nd place, silver medalist(s)	7	Daniel Grueso	Colombia	10.39	
3rd place, bronze medalist(s)	6	José Carlos Moreira	Brazil	10.49	
4	4	Kael Becerra	Chile	10.50	
5	3	Lee Prowell	Guyana	10.60	
6	2	Jermaine Chirinos	Venezuela	10.63	
7	1	Franklin Nazareno	Ecuador	10.76	
	8	Jorge Célio Sena	Brazil	DQ	Doping

=== 200 meters ===
Heats – June 20
Wind:
Heat 1: 0.0 m/s, Heat 2: -0.2 m/s, Heat 3: -0.4 m/s

Rank	Heat	Name	Nationality	Time	Notes
1	1	Alonso Edward	Panama	20.82	Q
2	3	Hugo de Sousa	Brazil	21.44	Q
3	2	Daniel Grueso	Colombia	21.45	Q
4	1	Kael Becerra	Chile	21.48	Q
5	3	Fabian Jiménez	Argentina	21.52	Q
6	2	Jurgen Themen	Suriname	21.66	q
7	1	Lee Prowell	Guyana	21.67	q
8	3	Franklin Nazareno	Ecuador	21.70	
9	2	Arturo Ramírez	Venezuela	21.75	
10	1	Federico Ruiz	Argentina	21.76	
11	3	Lannyn Cubillán	Venezuela	22.13	
12	3	Michael Saul	Guyana	22.50	
13	2	Leonardo Camargo	Bolivia	22.59	
14	3	Juan Carlos Flores	Peru	22.61	
15	1	Luis Morán	Ecuador	22.67	
16	2	Robert Borja	Peru	22.92	
	2	Bruno de Barros	Brazil	DQ	Doping

Final – June 21
Wind:
0.0 m/s

Rank	Lane	Name	Nationality	Time	Notes
1st place, gold medalist(s)	4	Alonso Edward	Panama	20.45	
2nd place, silver medalist(s)	3	Hugo de Sousa	Brazil	20.92	
3rd place, bronze medalist(s)	2	Kael Becerra	Chile	21.32	
4	7	Fabian Jiménez	Argentina	21.35	
5	8	Lee Prowell	Guyana	21.88	
	5	Bruno de Barros	Brazil	DQ	Doping
	1	Jurgen Themen	Suriname	DNF	
	1	Daniel Grueso	Colombia	DNS	

=== 400 meters ===
Heats – June 20

Rank	Heat	Name	Nationality	Time	Notes
1	1	Andrés Silva	Uruguay	46.98	Q
2	2	Freddy Mezones	Venezuela	47.00	Q
3	1	Geiner Mosquera	Colombia	47.04	Q
4	2	Eduardo Vasconcelos	Brazil	47.06	Q
5	1	Luís Ambrosio	Brazil	47.56	Q
6	2	Pablo Navarrete	Chile	47.76	Q
7	2	John Valoyes	Colombia	47.83	q
8	1	Said Boni	Venezuela	48.25	q
9	1	Rodrigo Montoya	Peru	48.28	
10	2	Matias Larregle	Argentina	48.35	
11	1	Juan Eduardo López	Chile	48.37	
12	2	Julio Alfredo Pérez	Peru	48.61	
13	1	José Arce	Ecuador	49.66	
14	1	Fernando Covarrubias	Bolivia	50.60	
15	2	Evans Pinto	Bolivia	50.61	

Final – June 21

Rank	Lane	Name	Nationality	Time	Notes
1st place, gold medalist(s)	4	Andrés Silva	Uruguay	46.06	
2nd place, silver medalist(s)	5	Freddy Mezones	Venezuela	46.28	
3rd place, bronze medalist(s)	3	Geiner Mosquera	Colombia	46.28	
4	6	Eduardo Vasconcelos	Brazil	47.22	
5	2	Luís Ambrosio	Brazil	47.26	
6	7	Pablo Navarrete	Chile	47.52	
7	1	John Valoyes	Colombia	48.25	
8	8	Said Boni	Venezuela	48.62	

=== 800 meters ===
June 21

Rank	Name	Nationality	Time	Notes
1st place, gold medalist(s)	Fabiano Peçanha	Brazil	1:47.82	
2nd place, silver medalist(s)	Kléberson Davide	Brazil	1:49.33	
3rd place, bronze medalist(s)	Nico Herrera	Venezuela	1:49.53	
4	Leonardo Price	Argentina	1:50.75	
5	Andy Muñoz	Chile	1:50.88	
6	Julio Alfredo Pérez	Peru	1:51.49	
7	Evans Pinto	Bolivia	1:52.16	
8	Féderico Padilla	Colombia	1:52.19	
9	Mauricio Valdivia	Chile	1:53.07	
10	Rodrigo Montoya	Peru	1:53.14	

=== 1500 meters ===
June 19

Rank	Name	Nationality	Time	Notes
1st place, gold medalist(s)	Byron Piedra	Ecuador	3:41.81	
2nd place, silver medalist(s)	Hudson de Souza	Brazil	3:42.72	
3rd place, bronze medalist(s)	Eduar Villanueva	Venezuela	3:43.23	
4	Mario Bazán	Peru	3:43.68	NR
5	Nico Herrera	Venezuela	3:45.12	
6	Jeferson Peña	Colombia	3:45.35	
7	Iván López	Chile	3:47.75	
8	Eder da Silva	Brazil	3:48.60	
9	Mauricio Valdivia	Chile	3:51.35	
10	Paulo Buenaño	Ecuador	4:07.09	
	Leonardo Price	Argentina	DNF	

=== 5000 meters ===
June 21

Rank	Name	Nationality	Time	Notes
1st place, gold medalist(s)	Byron Piedra	Ecuador	13:56.93	
2nd place, silver medalist(s)	Mario Bazán	Peru	13:57.37	
3rd place, bronze medalist(s)	Damião de Souza	Brazil	13:57.94	
4	Jeferson Peña	Colombia	13:57.95	
5	Miguel Barzola	Argentina	14:00.08	
6	Jhon Cusi	Peru	14:12.51	
7	Jonathan Monje	Chile	14:31.91	
8	Alexander de los Santos	Uruguay	14:41.32	
9	Iván López	Chile	14:42.61	
10	Paulo Buenaño	Ecuador	14:45.94	
11	Eduardo Aruquipa	Bolivia	14:58.25	
	Martín Cuestas	Uruguay	DNF	

=== 10,000 meters ===
June 20

Rank	Name	Nationality	Time	Notes
1st place, gold medalist(s)	Damião de Souza	Brazil	29:23.57	
2nd place, silver medalist(s)	Miguel Barzola	Argentina	29:23.62	
3rd place, bronze medalist(s)	Jhon Cusi	Peru	29:40.05	
4	Franklin Tenorio	Ecuador	29:41.60	
5	Serapio Galindo	Peru	30:18.38	
6	Miguel Almachi	Ecuador	30:19.63	
7	Raúl Mora	Chile	30:30.23	
8	Alexander de los Santos	Uruguay	30:42.72	
9	Jonathan Monje	Chile	30:50.89	
10	Pedro Mora	Venezuela	31:49.43	
	Eduardo Aruquipa	Bolivia	DNF	
	Daniel da Silva	Brazil	DNF	

=== 110 meters hurdles ===
Heats – June 19
Wind:
Heat 1: -1.6 m/s, Heat 2: -0.8 m/s

Rank	Heat	Name	Nationality	Time	Notes
1	2	Paulo Villar	Colombia	13.83	Q
2	2	Eder Souza	Brazil	13.93	Q
3	1	Anselmo da Silva	Brazil	14.23	Q
4	1	Jonathan Davis	Venezuela	14.45	Q
5	1	Mariano Romero	Argentina	14.52	Q
6	2	Francisco Castro	Chile	14.65	Q
7	1	Ernesto Stanley	Paraguay	15.16	q
8	2	John Tamayo	Ecuador	15.22	q
9	2	Juan Castillo	Peru	15.32	
10	1	Javier McFarlane	Peru	15.51	

Final – June 20
Wind:
-0.5 m/s

Rank	Lane	Name	Nationality	Time	Notes
1st place, gold medalist(s)	4	Paulo Villar	Colombia	13.89	
2nd place, silver medalist(s)	5	Eder Souza	Brazil	13.97	
3rd place, bronze medalist(s)	3	Anselmo da Silva	Brazil	14.12	
4	7	Francisco Castro	Chile	14.51	
5	6	Jonathan Davis	Venezuela	14.56	
	2	Mariano Romero	Argentina	DQ	FS
	8	John Tamayo	Ecuador	DQ	FS
	1	Ernesto Stanley	Paraguay	DNS	

=== 400 meters hurdles ===
Heats – June 20

Rank	Heat	Name	Nationality	Time	Notes
1	2	Raphael Fernandes	Brazil	51.59	Q
2	1	Mahau Suguimati	Brazil	51.74	Q
3	1	Andrés Silva	Uruguay	51.78	Q
4	2	Amílcar Torres	Colombia	51.79	Q
5	1	Yeison Rivas	Colombia	51.81	Q
6	2	Gustavo Gutiérrez	Chile	52.38	Q
7	1	José Ignacio Pignataro	Argentina	52.66	q
8	1	Víctor Solarte	Venezuela	54.14	q
9	1	John Tamayo	Ecuador	55.42	
10	1	Hugo Vilca	Peru	56.45	
11	2	José Carlos Vilca	Peru	56.53	
12	2	Paulo Mejia	Bolivia	57.92	
	2	Christian Deymonnaz	Argentina	DNS	

Final – June 21

Rank	Lane	Name	Nationality	Time	Notes
1st place, gold medalist(s)	3	Andrés Silva	Uruguay	50.28	
2nd place, silver medalist(s)	4	Raphael Fernandes	Brazil	50.42	
3rd place, bronze medalist(s)	2	Yeison Rivas	Colombia	50.87	
4	5	Mahau Suguimati	Brazil	51.50	
5	6	Amílcar Torres	Colombia	51.93	
6	8	Víctor Solarte	Venezuela	53.08	
7	1	José Ignacio Pignataro	Argentina	53.16	
8	7	Gustavo Gutiérrez	Chile	53.17	

=== 3000 meters steeplechase ===
June 20

Rank	Name	Nationality	Time	Notes
1st place, gold medalist(s)	Mario Bazán	Peru	8:35.17	
2nd place, silver medalist(s)	José Peña	Venezuela	8:36.17	
3rd place, bronze medalist(s)	Mariano Mastromarino	Argentina	8:51.48	
4	Esteban Coria	Argentina	9:01.67	
5	Enzo Yañez	Chile	9:04.68	
6	Gerardo Villacres	Ecuador	9:04.77	
7	Raúl Mora	Chile	9:09.58	
8	Martín Mañana	Uruguay	9:25.95	
9	Renzo José Lizarraga	Peru	9:31.52	
	Alex Fernando	Brazil	DNF	
	Cristian Patiño	Ecuador	DNF	
	Gládson Barbosa	Brazil	DNF	

=== 4 x 100 meters relay ===
June 20

Rank	Lane	Nation	Competitors	Time	Notes
1st place, gold medalist(s)	4	Colombia	Yeison Rivas, John Valoyes, Geiner Mosquera, Daniel Grueso	39.41	
2nd place, silver medalist(s)	3	Venezuela	Lannyn Cubillán, Jermaine Chirinos, Álvaro Cassiani, Ronald Amaya	40.26	
3rd place, bronze medalist(s)	6	Argentina	Matías Usandivaras, Fabian Jiménez, Miguel Wilken, José Manuel Garaventa	40.76	
4	2	Ecuador	John Tamayo, Franklin Nazareno, Hugo Chila, Luis Morán	41.41	
5	1	Peru	Robert Borja, Rosendo Valiente, Javier McFarlane, Álvaro Romero	42.11	
6	7	Bolivia	Andres Carranza, Fernando Covarrubias, Javier Valenzuela, Leonardo Camargo	42.40	
	5	Brazil	Vicente de Lima, Rafael Ribeiro, Jorge Célio Sena, José Carlos Moreira	DQ	Doping

=== 4 x 400 meters relay ===
June 21

Rank	Nation	Competitors	Time	Notes
1st place, gold medalist(s)	Colombia	Yeison Rivas, John Valoyes, Amílcar Torres, Geiner Mosquera	3:06.22	
2nd place, silver medalist(s)	Brazil	Luís Ambrósio, Eduardo Vasconcelos, Rodrigo Bargas, Wallace Vieira	3:06.85	
3rd place, bronze medalist(s)	Argentina	Matías Larregle, Miguel Wilken, Christian Deymonnaz, Fabian Jímenez	3:11.70	
4	Chile	Juan Eduardo López, Andy Muñoz, Gustavo Gutiérrez, Pablo Navarrete	3:12.04	
5	Peru	Rodrigo Montoya, Julio Alfredo Pérez, Hugo Vilca, José Carlos Vilca	3:20.85	
	Venezuela	Said Boni, Alberth Bravo, Alberto Aguilar, Freddy Mezones	DQ	R. 170.9

=== 20,000 meters walk ===
June 21

Rank	Name	Nationality	Time	Notes
1st place, gold medalist(s)	Luis Fernando López	Colombia	1:20:53.6	CR, AR
2nd place, silver medalist(s)	Yerko Araya	Chile	1:23:08.2	
3rd place, bronze medalist(s)	Patricio Ortega	Ecuador	1:23:30.9	
4	Pavel Chihuán	Peru	1:23:55.1	NR
5	Mário dos Santos	Brazil	1:25:14.8	
6	Juan Manuel Cano	Argentina	1:28:34.8	
7	Yashir Cabrera	Panama	1:32:11.1	
8	Alex Tapia	Peru	1:32:27.9	
9	Fabio González	Argentina	1:38:40.7	
	José Alessandro Bagio	Brazil	DNF	
	Andrés Chocho	Ecuador	DNF	
	James Rendón	Colombia	DQ	

=== High jump ===
June 20

Rank	Name	Nationality	Result	Notes
1st place, gold medalist(s)	Jessé de Lima	Brazil	2.16	
2nd place, silver medalist(s)	Alberth Bravo	Venezuela	2.13	
3rd place, bronze medalist(s)	Diego Ferrín	Ecuador	2.10	
4	Rafael Guerci	Argentina	2.10	
5	Arturo Chávez	Peru	1.95	
	Guilherme Cobbo	Brazil		

=== Pole vault ===
June 20

Rank	Name	Nationality	Result	Notes
1st place, gold medalist(s)	Fábio Gomes da Silva	Brazil	5.40	
2nd place, silver medalist(s)	Marcelo Terra	Argentina	4.80	
3rd place, bronze medalist(s)	César González	Venezuela	4.80	
4	Víctor Medina	Colombia	4.70	
	João Gabriel de Souza	Brazil	DQ	Doping
	Francisco Léon	Peru		

=== Long jump ===
June 21

Rank	Name	Nationality	Result	Notes
1st place, gold medalist(s)	Rogério Bispo	Brazil	7.77	
2nd place, silver medalist(s)	Erivaldo Vieira	Brazil	7.61	
3rd place, bronze medalist(s)	Hugo Chila	Ecuador	7.51	
4	Emiliano Lasa	Uruguay	7.14	
5	Javier McFarlane	Peru	7.09	
6	Álvaro Romero	Peru	7.01	
7	Francisco Pávez	Argentina	6.92	
8	Hamid Chipunari	Bolivia	6.67	
9	Miguel Castro	Ecuador	6.55	
10	Miguel Alfaro	Bolivia	6.37	

=== Triple jump ===
June 20

Rank	Name	Nationality	Result	Notes
1st place, gold medalist(s)	Jefferson Sabino	Brazil	16.38w	
2nd place, silver medalist(s)	Hugo Chila	Ecuador	16.12	
3rd place, bronze medalist(s)	Maximiliano Díaz	Argentina	15.49	
4	Ronald José Belisario	Venezuela	14.99	
5	José Adrián Sornoza	Ecuador	14.90	
6	Martín Osvaldo Fálico	Argentina	14.70	
7	Álvaro Romero	Peru	14.43	
8	Ivan Ortiz	Bolivia	13.77	
	Leonardo Elisiario dos Santos	Brazil	DQ	Doping

=== Shot put ===
June 20

Rank	Name	Nationality	Result	Notes
1st place, gold medalist(s)	Germán Lauro	Argentina	19.20	
2nd place, silver medalist(s)	Ronald Julião	Brazil	18.19	
3rd place, bronze medalist(s)	Gustavo de Mendoça	Brazil	17.55	
4	Marco Antonio Verni	Chile	17.45	
5	Maximiliano Alonso	Chile	16.87	
6	Jesús Parejo	Venezuela	16.82	
7	Aldo González	Bolivia	16.77	
8	Josnner Ortiz	Venezuela	16.40	
9	Javier Nieto	Peru	16.37	
10	Jorge Mina	Ecuador	13.99	
11	Edmundo Lizarzaburu	Peru	12.69	

=== Discus throw ===
June 21

Rank	Name	Nationality	Result	Notes
1st place, gold medalist(s)	Germán Lauro	Argentina	60.41	
2nd place, silver medalist(s)	Jorge Balliengo	Argentina	58.04	
3rd place, bronze medalist(s)	Ronald Julião	Brazil	54.97	
4	Jesús Parejo	Venezuela	54.72	
5	Max Xavier dos Santos	Brazil	54.06	
6	Maximiliano Alonso	Chile	53.71	
7	Rodolfo Casanova	Uruguay	48.22	
8	Javier Nieto	Peru	45.19	
	David Juros	Peru		

=== Hammer throw ===
June 20

Rank	Name	Nationality	Result	Notes
1st place, gold medalist(s)	Juan Ignacio Cerra	Argentina	69.42	
2nd place, silver medalist(s)	Patricio Palma	Chile	68.53	
3rd place, bronze medalist(s)	Eduardo Acuña	Peru	67.26	NR
4	Wagner Domingos	Brazil	67.10	
5	Roberto Saez	Chile	65.80	
6	Aldo Bello	Venezuela	63.20	
7	Allan Wolski	Brazil	60.38	
8	Gilbert Volta	Peru	47.60	

=== Javelin throw ===
June 20

Rank	Name	Nationality	Result	Notes
1st place, gold medalist(s)	Arley Ibargüen	Colombia	81.07	NR
2nd place, silver medalist(s)	Noraldo Palacios	Colombia	77.87	
3rd place, bronze medalist(s)	Júlio César de Oliveira	Brazil	73.51	
4	Luiz Fernando da Silva	Brazil	72.54	
5	Ignacio Guerra	Chile	69.63	
6	Víctor Fatecha	Paraguay	67.59	
7	François Pouzet	Chile	64.79	
8	Jorge Gustavo Quiñones	Peru	59.55	
9	Michael Musselman	Peru	58.93	

=== Decathlon ===
The highest mark recorded in each event is highlighted in yellow

Rank	Athlete	Nationality	100m	LJ	SP	HJ	400m	110m H	DT	PV	JT	1500m	Points	Notes
1st place, gold medalist(s)	Carlos Eduardo Chinin	Brazil	11.07	7.10	13.51	1.96	49.63	14.88	40.59	4.40	53.30	4:55.87	7474	
2nd place, silver medalist(s)	Oscar Mina	Ecuador	10.92	6.44	11.86	1.96	49.67	16.75	38.82	3.50	48.04	4:58.57	6659	
3rd place, bronze medalist(s)	Fernando Korniejczuk	Argentina	11.67	6.58	11.85	1.90	53.66	15.46	36.00	4.10	49.86	5:11.39	6505	
4	Victorio Gotuzo	Peru	11.45	6.40	11.87	1.93	52.37	16.33	33.63	3.00	47.20	4:37.76	6316	
5	Richard Minda	Ecuador	11.86	5.65	12.45	1.84	52.37	16.70	33.53	2.90	47.53	5:16.09	5032	
	Ânderson Venâncio	Brazil	11.04	7.00	12.30	1.60	–	–	–	–	–	–	DNF	
	Gerardo Canale	Argentina	11.75	6.47	12.64	–	–	–	–	–	–	–	DNF	
	Humberto Suarez	Peru	12.54	5.09	10.96	–	–	–	–	–	–	–	DNF	

== Women's results ==
=== 100 meters ===
Heats – June 19
Wind:
Heat 1: -2.0 m/s, Heat 2: -0.2 m/s

Rank	Heat	Name	Nationality	Time	Notes
1	2	Felipa Palacios	Colombia	11.86	Q
2	2	Thaissa Presti	Brazil	11.91	Q
3	1	Lucimar de Moura	Brazil	11.92	Q
4	1	Nelcy Caicedo	Colombia	12.06	Q
5	2	Carmen Chourio	Venezuela	12.20	Q
6	1	Karla Mendoza	Peru	12.25	Q
7	2	Maitté Zamorano	Bolivia	12.41	q
8	1	Nancy Garcés	Venezuela	12.46	q
9	1	Sunayna Wahi	Suriname	12.47	
10	2	Paola Mautino	Peru	12.49	
11	2	Liliana Nuñez	Ecuador	12.51	

Final – June 20
Wind:
-0.8 m/s

Rank	Lane	Name	Nationality	Time	Notes
1st place, gold medalist(s)	3	Lucimar de Moura	Brazil	11.59	
2nd place, silver medalist(s)	4	Felipa Palacios	Colombia	11.79	
3rd place, bronze medalist(s)	5	Thaissa Presti	Brazil	11.85	
4	6	Nelcy Caicedo	Colombia	11.99	
5	7	Karla Mendoza	Peru	12.17	
6	2	Carmen Chourio	Venezuela	12.22	
7	8	Nancy Garcés	Venezuela	12.28	
8	1	Maitté Zamorano	Bolivia	12.68	

=== 200 meters ===
Heats – June 20
Wind:
Heat 1: -0.3 m/s, Heat 2: -0.2 m/s

Rank	Heat	Name	Nationality	Time	Notes
1	2	Norma González	Colombia	24.42	Q
2	2	Thaissa Presti	Brazil	24.67	Q
3	1	Jennifer Padilla	Colombia	24.68	Q
4	2	Carmen Chourio	Venezuela	24.89	Q
5	1	Erika Chávez	Ecuador	24.97	Q
6	1	Sunayna Wahi	Suriname	25.14	Q
7	2	Karla Mendoza	Peru	25.26	q
8	2	Liliana Nuñez	Ecuador	25.28	q
9	1	Nancy Garcés	Venezuela	25.70	
10	2	Maira Cano	Bolivia	26.00	
11	1	Amanda Quispe	Peru	26.17	
	1	Evelyn dos Santos	Brazil	DNS	

Final – June 21
Wind:
-0.0 m/s

Rank	Lane	Name	Nationality	Time	Notes
1st place, gold medalist(s)	4	Norma González	Colombia	23.73	
2nd place, silver medalist(s)	5	Thaissa Presti	Brazil	23.85	
3rd place, bronze medalist(s)	3	Jennifer Padilla	Colombia	24.23	
4	2	Erika Chávez	Ecuador	24.45	
5	7	Sunayna Wahi	Suriname	25.04	
6	1	Karla Mendoza	Peru	25.05	
7	6	Carmen Chourio	Venezuela	25.23	
8	8	Liliana Nuñez	Ecuador	25.32	

=== 400 meters ===
Heats – June 20

Rank	Heat	Name	Nationality	Time	Notes
1	2	Emmily Pinheiro	Brazil	53.76	Q
2	2	María Idrobo	Colombia	53.78	Q
3	1	Norma González	Colombia	54.45	Q
4	1	Jailma de Lima	Brazil	54.73	Q
5	1	Lucy Jaramillo	Ecuador	56.59	Q
6	2	Claudia Meneses	Peru	56.68	Q
7	2	Erika Chávez	Ecuador	56.74	q
8	1	Maira Cano	Bolivia	59.08	q
9	1	Monica Vera	Peru	59.77	

Final – June 21

Rank	Lane	Name	Nationality	Time	Notes
1st place, gold medalist(s)	3	Norma González	Colombia	52.62	
2nd place, silver medalist(s)	4	Emmily Pinheiro	Brazil	52.73	
3rd place, bronze medalist(s)	6	Jailma de Lima	Brazil	52.95	
4	5	María Idrobo	Colombia	53.54	
5	2	Lucy Jaramillo	Ecuador	55.74	
6	1	Erika Chávez	Ecuador	56.58	
7	7	Claudia Meneses	Peru	57.21	
8	8	Maira Cano	Bolivia	DQ	

=== 800 meters ===
June 21

Rank	Name	Nationality	Time	Notes
1st place, gold medalist(s)	Rosibel García	Colombia	2:05.21	
2nd place, silver medalist(s)	Christiane Ritz	Brazil	2:06.72	
3rd place, bronze medalist(s)	Muriel Coneo	Colombia	2:07.32	
4	Andrea Ferris	Panama	2:07.33	
5	Daysi Ugarte	Bolivia	2:09.17	
6	María Osorio	Venezuela	2:11.40	
7	María Corozo	Ecuador	2:14.58	
8	Cynthia Fuentes	Peru	2:15.56	
	Josiane Tito	Brazil	DQ	Doping

=== 1500 meters ===
June 19

Rank	Name	Nationality	Time	Notes
1st place, gold medalist(s)	Rosibel García	Colombia	4:20.30	
2nd place, silver medalist(s)	Muriel Coneo	Colombia	4:23.38	
3rd place, bronze medalist(s)	Rosa Godoy	Argentina	4:23.63	
4	Andrea Ferris	Panama	4:24.14	
5	Nicole Manriquez	Chile	4:25.12	
6	María Osorio	Venezuela	4:26.50	
7	Geisiane de Lima	Brazil	4:26.78	
8	Rocío Huillca	Peru	4:32.18	
9	Jenifer Silva	Brazil	4:32.52	
10	Mariela Alvarez	Peru	4:32.59	
11	Viviana Acosta	Ecuador	4:39.63	

=== 5000 meters ===
June 19

Rank	Name	Nationality	Time	Notes
1st place, gold medalist(s)	Inés Melchor	Peru	16:00.41	NR
2nd place, silver medalist(s)	Sueli Silva	Brazil	16:14.95	
3rd place, bronze medalist(s)	Rosa Chacha	Ecuador	16:17.75	
4	María Elena Calle	Ecuador	16:36.95	
5	Bertha Sánchez	Colombia	16:42.19	
6	Roxana Preussler	Argentina	16:53.98	
7	Clara Morales	Chile	17:00.38	
8	María Peralta	Argentina	17:21.06	
9	Rocío Cantara	Peru	17:23.27	
	Ángela Figueroa	Colombia	DNF	
	Érika Olivera	Chile	DNF	

=== 10,000 meters ===
June 19

Rank	Name	Nationality	Time	Notes
1st place, gold medalist(s)	Inés Melchor	Peru	33:11.79	NR
2nd place, silver medalist(s)	Nonata Cruz	Brazil	33:36.60	
3rd place, bronze medalist(s)	Sueli Silva	Brazil	33:47.15	
4	Rosa Chacha	Ecuador	34:51.14	
5	Bertha Sánchez	Colombia	35:07.82	
6	Roxana Preussler	Argentina	35:20.43	
7	Rocío Cantara	Peru	35:37.99	
8	Clara Morales	Chile	35:48.70	
	Érika Olivera	Chile	DNS	
	María Peralta	Argentina	DNS	

=== 100 meters hurdles ===
Heats – June 19
Wind:
Heat 1: -0.8 m/s, Heat 2: 0.0 m/s

Rank	Heat	Name	Nationality	Time	Notes
1	1	Briggite Merlano	Colombia	13.48	Q
2	2	Fabiana Morães	Brazil	13.53	Q
3	2	Francisca Guzmán	Chile	13.64	Q
4	1	Gisele de Albuquerque	Brazil	13.85	Q
5	1	Soledad Donzino	Argentina	14.16	Q
6	2	María Ruiz	Ecuador	14.69	Q
7	1	Ljubica Milos	Chile	14.85	q
8	1	Eliana Ayin	Peru	15.58	q
	2	Hilma Riesco	Peru	DNF	

Final – June 20
Wind:
-0.2 m/s

Rank	Lane	Name	Nationality	Time	Notes
1st place, gold medalist(s)	4	Briggite Merlano	Colombia	13.22	
2nd place, silver medalist(s)	2	Soledad Donzino	Argentina	13.48	
3rd place, bronze medalist(s)	5	Fabiana Morães	Brazil	13.56	
4	3	Francisca Guzmán	Chile	13.57	
5	6	Gisele de Albuquerque	Brazil	13.93	
6	1	Ljubica Milos	Chile	14.56	
7	8	Eliana Ayin	Peru	15.79	
	7	María Ruiz	Ecuador	DNS	

=== 400 meters hurdles ===
Heats – June 20

Rank	Heat	Name	Nationality	Time	Notes
1	1	Madelene Rondón	Venezuela	1:00.60	Q
2	1	Lucy Jaramillo	Ecuador	1:00.68	Q
3	1	Déborah Rodríguez	Uruguay	1:00.74	q
4	2	Princesa Oliveros	Colombia	1:02.38	Q
5	2	Karina Caicedo	Ecuador	1:03.21	Q
6	2	Claudia Meneses	Peru	1:03.31	q
7	1	Rocío Rodrich	Peru	1:03.58	
8	2	Alison Sánchez	Bolivia	1:05.08	
9	1	Adriana Mejia	Bolivia	1:06.77	
	1	Lucimar Teodoro	Brazil	DQ	Doping
	2	Luciana França	Brazil	DQ	Doping

Final – June 21

Rank	Lane	Name	Nationality	Time	Notes
1st place, gold medalist(s)	3	Madelene Rondón	Venezuela	58.29	
2nd place, silver medalist(s)	6	Lucy Jaramillo	Ecuador	58.45	
3rd place, bronze medalist(s)	7	Princesa Oliveros	Colombia	58.67	
4	2	Déborah Rodríguez	Uruguay	1:00.07	
5	8	Claudia Meneses	Peru	1:02.02	
6	1	Karina Caicedo	Ecuador	1:05.19	
	4	Lucimar Teodoro	Brazil	DQ	Doping
	5	Luciana França	Brazil	DQ	Doping

=== 3000 meters steeplechase ===
June 20

Rank	Name	Nationality	Time	Notes
1st place, gold medalist(s)	Sabine Heitling	Brazil	9:52.54	
2nd place, silver medalist(s)	Ángela Figueroa	Colombia	9:54.83	
3rd place, bronze medalist(s)	Rosa Godoy	Argentina	10:12.95	
4	Patrícia Lobo	Brazil	10:33.68	
5	Rocío Huillca	Peru	10:41.21	
6	Faustina Huamani	Peru	10:45.60	
7	Marlene Acuña	Ecuador	10:55.71	

=== 4 x 100 meters relay ===
June 20

Rank	Lane	Nation	Competitors	Time	Notes
1st place, gold medalist(s)	4	Colombia	Felipa Palacios, María Idrobo, Darlenys Obregón, Norma González	44.18	
2nd place, silver medalist(s)	5	Brazil	Rosemar Coelho Neto, Lucimar de Moura, Thaissa Presti, Jailma de Lima	44.52	
3rd place, bronze medalist(s)	2	Ecuador	Lorena Mina, Karina Caicedo, Liliana Nuñez, Erika Chávez	47.20	
4	6	Peru	Karla Mendoza, Paola Mautino, Hilma Riesco, Roxana Mendoza	48.18	
5	1	Bolivia	Lupita Rojas, Maira Cano, Alison Sánchez, Adriana Mejia	48.46	

=== 4 x 400 meters relay ===
June 21

Rank	Nation	Competitors	Time	Notes
1st place, gold medalist(s)	Brazil	Geisa Coutinho, Sheila Ferreira, Jailma de Lima, Emmily Pinheiro	3:32.69	
2nd place, silver medalist(s)	Colombia	Kelly López, María Idrobo, Jennifer Padilla, Norma González	3:35.83	
3rd place, bronze medalist(s)	Ecuador	Karina Caicedo, Erika Chávez, María Corozo, Lucy Jaramillo	3:45.99	
4	Bolivia	Adriana Mejia, Daysi Ugarte, Alison Sánchez, Maira Cano	3:51.33	NR
5	Peru	Monica Vera, Rocío Rodrich, Cynthia Fuentes, Claudia Meneses	3:54.18	

=== 20,000 meters walk ===
June 20

Rank	Name	Nationality	Time	Notes
1st place, gold medalist(s)	Johana Ordóñez	Ecuador	1:34:57.9	
2nd place, silver medalist(s)	Sandra Zapata	Colombia	1:35:53.2	
3rd place, bronze medalist(s)	Tânia Spindler	Brazil	1:36:31.7	
4	Cisiane Lopes	Brazil	1:36:38.5	
5	Milangela Rosales	Venezuela	1:39:17.3	
6	Farilus Morales	Peru	1:42:04.9	
7	Fanny Huaman	Peru	1:44:02.9	
	Cláudia Cornejo	Bolivia	DQ	
	Jannet Mamani	Bolivia	DQ	
	Paola Pérez	Ecuador	DQ	
	Josette Sepúlveda	Chile	DQ	

=== High jump ===
June 20

Rank	Name	Nationality	Result	Notes
1st place, gold medalist(s)	Caterine Ibargüen	Colombia	1.88	
2nd place, silver medalist(s)	Solange Witteveen	Argentina	1.85	
3rd place, bronze medalist(s)	Mônica de Freitas	Brazil	1.82	
4	Eliana da Silva	Brazil	1.76	
5	Florencia Vergara	Chile	1.73	
6	Gabriela Saravia	Peru	1.65	
	Adriana Ortiz	Peru		

=== Pole vault ===
June 19

Rank	Name	Nationality	Result	Notes
1st place, gold medalist(s)	Fabiana Murer	Brazil	4.60	
2nd place, silver medalist(s)	Carolina Torres	Chile	4.10	
3rd place, bronze medalist(s)	Alejandra García	Argentina	4.10	
4	Karla da Silva	Brazil	4.00	
5	Milena Agudelo	Colombia	4.00	
6	Daniela Inchausti	Argentina	3.90	

=== Long jump ===
June 21

Rank	Name	Nationality	Result	Notes
1st place, gold medalist(s)	Keila Costa	Brazil	6.62	
2nd place, silver medalist(s)	Andrea Morales	Argentina	5.78	
3rd place, bronze medalist(s)	Verónica Davis	Venezuela	5.60	
4	Lorena Mina	Ecuador	5.49	
5	Giuliana Franciosi	Peru	5.45	
6	Gilda Massa	Peru	5.38	
7	Carla Cavero	Bolivia	5.30	
	Johanna Triviño	Colombia	DQ	Doping
	Fernanda Gonçalves	Brazil	DQ	Doping

=== Triple jump ===
June 21

Rank	Name	Nationality	Result	Notes
1st place, gold medalist(s)	Caterine Ibargüen	Colombia	13.93	
2nd place, silver medalist(s)	Verónica Davis	Venezuela	13.83	
3rd place, bronze medalist(s)	Tânia da Silva	Brazil	13.38	
4	Fernanda Gonçalves	Brazil	13.08	
5	Lorena Mina	Ecuador	12.73	
6	Solange Witteveen	Argentina	12.53	
7	Carla Cavero	Bolivia	11.79	
8	Francesca Oliva	Peru	11.62	
	Johanna Triviño	Colombia	DQ	Doping
	Andrea Ruiz	Peru		

=== Shot put ===
June 21

Rank	Name	Nationality	Result	Notes
1st place, gold medalist(s)	Natalia Ducó	Chile	17.73	
2nd place, silver medalist(s)	Elisângela Adriano	Brazil	16.63	
3rd place, bronze medalist(s)	Andréa Pereira	Brazil	16.16	
4	Luz Dary Castro	Colombia	15.28	
5	Alessandra Gamboa	Peru	13.81	
6	Karen Gallardo	Chile	12.93	
7	Claudia Monteverde	Peru	11.36	

=== Discus throw ===
June 20

Rank	Name	Nationality	Result	Notes
1st place, gold medalist(s)	Elisângela Adriano	Brazil	61.00	
2nd place, silver medalist(s)	Karen Gallardo	Chile	55.91	
3rd place, bronze medalist(s)	María Cubillán	Venezuela	54.07	
4	Rocío Comba	Argentina	51.72	
5	Andressa de Morais	Brazil	51.36	
6	Luz Dary Castro	Colombia	48.38	
7	Odette Palma	Chile	40.46	
8	María Ramos	Peru	40.46	
9	Claudia Monteverde	Peru	37.41	

=== Hammer throw ===
June 19

Rank	Name	Nationality	Result	Notes
1st place, gold medalist(s)	Johana Moreno	Colombia	65.79	
2nd place, silver medalist(s)	Odette Palma	Chile	64.55	
3rd place, bronze medalist(s)	Jennifer Dahlgren	Argentina	63.81	
4	Rosa Rodríguez	Venezuela	60.66	
5	Katiuscia de Jesus	Brazil	60.20	
6	Andressa de Morais	Brazil	58.12	
7	Zuleima Mina	Ecuador	52.32	
8	Karina Córdova	Peru	42.86	
9	Estela Parodi	Peru	40.66	

=== Javelin throw ===
June 19

Rank	Name	Nationality	Result	Notes
1st place, gold medalist(s)	Alessandra Resende	Brazil	56.36	
2nd place, silver medalist(s)	Jucilene de Lima	Brazil	54.37	
3rd place, bronze medalist(s)	Diana Rivas	Colombia	52.83	
4	María González	Venezuela	51.75	
5	Romina Maggi	Argentina	51.21	
6	Antonella Romagnini	Argentina	45.94	
7	Noelia Paredes	Peru	43.52	
8	Nadia Requena	Peru	38.47	

=== Heptathlon ===
The highest mark recorded in each event is highlighted in yellow

Rank	Athlete	Nationality	100m H	HJ	SP	200m	LJ	JT	800m	Points	Notes
1st place, gold medalist(s)	Vanessa Spinola	Brazil	14.43	1.64	13.41	24.86	5.46	43.82	2:22.29	5578	
2nd place, silver medalist(s)	Macarena Reyes	Chile	14.27	1.67	10.10	25.48	5.97	33.40	2:18.75	5360	NR
3rd place, bronze medalist(s)	Soledad Donzino	Argentina	13.53	1.67	10.07	25.60	5.68	37.12	2:37.28	5200	
4	Agustina Zerboni	Argentina	14.05	1.64	11.70	25.99	5.84	33.10	2:41.03	5090	
5	Ana Camila Pirelli	Paraguay	16.00	1.58	12.01	26.98	5.12	36.70	2:25.01	4754	
6	Melissa Arana	Peru	16.63	1.43	8.75	27.46	4.62	30.48	2:29.51	3949	
	Lucimara da Silva	Brazil	–	–	–	–	–	–	–	DQ	Doping
