= 2004 South American Under-23 Championships in Athletics – Results =

These are the full results of the 2004 South American Under-23 Championships in Athletics which took place between June 26 and June 27, 2004, at Polideportivo Máximo Viloria in Barquisimeto, Venezuela.

== Men's results ==
=== 100 meters ===
Heats – 26 June
Wind: Heat 1: +0.1 m/s, Heat 2: 0.0 m/s

Rank	Heat	Name	Nationality	Time	Notes
1	1	Eliézer de Almeida	Brazil	10.47	Q
2	2	Bruno Pacheco	Brazil	10.56	Q
	1	Cleavon Dillon	Trinidad and Tobago	10.63	guest
3	1	Daniel Grueso	Colombia	10.64	Q
4	1	Kael Becerra	Chile	10.70	Q
5	2	Wilmer Rivas	Venezuela	10.71	Q
6	2	Andrés Gallegos	Ecuador	10.78	Q
7	1	Pablo Heredia (athlete)	Argentina	10.90	q
7	1	Jorge Querales	Venezuela	10.90	q
9	2	Diego Valdés	Chile	10.93	
10	2	Eduar Mena	Colombia	11.01	
11	2	Pablo Cabrera	Argentina	11.04	
12	1	Franklin Nazareno	Ecuador	11.09	

Final – 26 June
Wind: +0.0 m/s

Rank	Name	Nationality	Time	Notes
1st place, gold medalist(s)	Bruno Pacheco	Brazil	10.28	
2nd place, silver medalist(s)	Eliézer de Almeida	Brazil	10.31	
3rd place, bronze medalist(s)	Daniel Grueso	Colombia	10.52	
4	Wilmer Rivas	Venezuela	10.58	
5	Kael Becerra	Chile	10.62	
6	Andrés Gallegos	Ecuador	10.66	
7	Jorge Querales	Venezuela	10.75	
	Pablo Heredia (athlete)	Argentina	?	

=== 200 meters ===
Heats – 27 June
Wind: Heat 1: -0.6 m/s, Heat 2: -1.3 m/s

Rank	Heat	Name	Nationality	Time	Notes
1	1	Bruno Pacheco	Brazil	20.69	Q
2	1	José Acevedo	Venezuela	20.96	Q
	1	José Carabalí	Venezuela	21.06	guest
	1	Helly Ollarves	Venezuela	21.13	guest
	1	Julien Raeburn	Trinidad and Tobago	21.18	guest
	2	Andre Brown	Trinidad and Tobago	21.42	guest
3	2	Jhon Valoyes	Colombia	21.46	Q
4	2	Basílio de Morães	Brazil	21.55	Q
5	2	Wilmer Rivas	Venezuela	21.56	Q
6	2	Mariano Jiménez	Argentina	21.80	Q
7	2	Andrés Gallegos	Ecuador	21.91	q
8	1	Franklin Nazareno	Ecuador	21.92	q
9	2	Pablo Cabrera	Argentina	22.21	
10	1	Diego Valdés	Chile	22.29	
		Kael Becerra	Chile	DNF	

Final – 27 June
Wind: +0.0 m/s

Rank	Name	Nationality	Time	Notes
1st place, gold medalist(s)	Bruno Pacheco	Brazil	20.75	
2nd place, silver medalist(s)	Basílio de Morães	Brazil	21.06	
3rd place, bronze medalist(s)	Wilmer Rivas	Venezuela	21.30	
4	Mariano Jiménez	Argentina	21.39	
5	Jhon Valoyes	Colombia	21.41	
6	Franklin Nazareno	Ecuador	21.92	
	José Acevedo	Venezuela	?	
	Andrés Gallegos	Ecuador	?	

=== 400 meters ===
Heats – 26 June

Rank	Heat	Name	Nationality	Time	Notes
1	1	Luis Ambrósio	Brazil	46.77	Q
2	2	Luis Luna	Venezuela	46.87	Q
3	1	Andrés Silva	Uruguay	47.09	Q
4	1	José Faneite	Venezuela	47.17	Q
5	2	Thiago Pereira Chyaromont	Brazil	47.27	Q
6	2	Jhon Valoyes	Colombia	47.32	Q
7	2	Francisco Aguirre	Ecuador	47.94	q
8	2	César Barquero	Peru	48.04	q
9	1	Cristián Reyes	Chile	48.05	
10	2	Mariano Jiménez	Argentina	48.16	
11	1	Arley Ruíz	Colombia	48.87	
12	1	Marco Rivadeneira	Ecuador	49.60	
13	1	Scatland Trevor	Guyana	49.73	
14	2	Cristopher Duvinguelo	Chile	50.54	
15	2	Sibe Cornelis	Suriname	52.66	

Final – 26 June

Rank	Name	Nationality	Time	Notes
1st place, gold medalist(s)	Andrés Silva	Uruguay	45.80	
2nd place, silver medalist(s)	Luis Luna	Venezuela	46.03	
3rd place, bronze medalist(s)	Luis Ambrósio	Brazil	46.46	
4	José Faneite	Venezuela	46.75	
5	Jhon Valoyes	Colombia	48.04	
6	Francisco Aguirre	Ecuador	49.09	
	Thiago Pereira Chyaromont	Brazil	?	
	César Barquero	Peru	?	

=== 800 meters ===
Final – 27 June

Rank	Name	Nationality	Time	Notes
1st place, gold medalist(s)	Bayron Piedra	Ecuador	1:47.43	
2nd place, silver medalist(s)	Simoncito Silvera	Venezuela	1:47.53	
3rd place, bronze medalist(s)	Fabiano Peçanha	Brazil	1:48.66	
4	Diego Chargal Diniz Gomes	Brazil	1:48.78	
5	César Barquero	Peru	1:49.50	
6	Cristián Matute	Ecuador	1:49.51	
7	José Manuel González	Venezuela	1:50.58	
8	Féderico Padilla	Colombia	1:52.16	
9	Scatland Trevor	Guyana	1:58.45	
10	Sibe Cornelis	Suriname	1:59.70	

=== 1500 meters ===
Final – 26 June

Rank	Name	Nationality	Time	Notes
1st place, gold medalist(s)	Bayron Piedra	Ecuador	3:46.37	
2nd place, silver medalist(s)	Nico Herrera	Venezuela	3:48.25	
3rd place, bronze medalist(s)	Leslie Encina	Chile	3:50.40	
4	Manuel González	Venezuela	3:50.84	
5	Sebastián Pino	Chile	3:52.49	
6	Jhon Cusi	Peru	3:55.49	
7	Cleyton Aguiar	Brazil	3:55.80	
8	Óscar Lesmes	Colombia	3:59.56	

=== 5000 meters ===
Final – 26 June

Rank	Name	Nationality	Time	Notes
1st place, gold medalist(s)	Manuel Bellorín	Venezuela	14:52.11	
2nd place, silver medalist(s)	Óscar Lesmes	Colombia	14:53.59	
3rd place, bronze medalist(s)	Eduard Villanueva	Venezuela	15:52.40	
4	Cleveland Forde	Guyana	16:13.03	

=== 10,000 meters ===
Final – 27 June

Rank	Name	Nationality	Time	Notes
1st place, gold medalist(s)	João Augusto Stingelin	Brazil	30:51.13	
2nd place, silver medalist(s)	Jhon Cusi	Peru	31:18.13	
3rd place, bronze medalist(s)	Leslie Encina	Chile	31:20.36	
4	Dany Cornieles	Venezuela	31:24.94	
5	Leandro Prates de Oliveira	Brazil	31:50.42	
6	Santiago Figueroa	Argentina	32:32.03	
7	Cleveland Forde	Guyana	36:46.26	
	Hugo Díaz	Chile	DNF	
	Delvis Sánchez	Venezuela	DNF	
	Mariano Mastromarino	Argentina	DNF	

=== 3000 meters steeplechase ===
Final – 27 June

Rank	Name	Nationality	Time	Notes
1st place, gold medalist(s)	Mariano Mastromarino	Argentina	8:54.92	
2nd place, silver medalist(s)	Jean Calzadilla	Venezuela	8:56.55	
3rd place, bronze medalist(s)	Sergio Lobos	Chile	9:01.44	
4	Sebastián Pino	Chile	9:12.75	
5	Dugaldo Vera	Venezuela	9:17.30	
6	Vinícius Campos Lopes	Brazil	9:17.55	
7	Jhon García	Colombia	9:21.36	
	Fernando Fernandes	Brazil	DNF	

=== 110 meters hurdles ===
Final – 27 June
Wind: -0.4 m/s

Rank	Name	Nationality	Time	Notes
1st place, gold medalist(s)	Mauricio da Silva Teixeira	Brazil	14.03	
2nd place, silver medalist(s)	Francisco Schilling	Chile	14.23	
3rd place, bronze medalist(s)	Marlean Reina	Venezuela	14.45	
4	Leandro Peyrano	Argentina	14.56	
5	Francisco Castro	Chile	15.32	
6	Óscar Candanoza	Colombia	15.57	

=== 400 meters hurdles ===
Heats – 26 June

Rank	Heat	Name	Nationality	Time	Notes
1	2	Diego Venâncio	Brazil	52.37	Q
2	1	José Ignacio Pignataro	Argentina	52.71	Q
3	2	Sebastián Lasquera	Argentina	52.67	Q
4	1	Raphael Fernandes	Brazil	52.82	Q
5	2	Víctor Solarte	Venezuela	53.19	Q
6	1	Óscar Candanoza	Colombia	53.50	Q
7	1	Ángel Rodríguez	Venezuela	53.58	q
8	1	Francisco Schilling	Chile	56.12	q

Final – 26 June

Rank	Name	Nationality	Time	Notes
1st place, gold medalist(s)	Sebastián Lasquera	Argentina	50.48	
2nd place, silver medalist(s)	Diego Venâncio	Brazil	50.49	
3rd place, bronze medalist(s)	Raphael Fernandes	Brazil	50.84	
4	Víctor Solarte	Venezuela	51.14	
5	José Ignacio Pignataro	Argentina	51.15	
6	Ángel Rodríguez	Venezuela	53.02	
7	Óscar Candanoza	Colombia	53.11	
8	Francisco Schilling	Chile	55.25	

=== High jump ===
Final – 27 June

Rank	Name	Nationality	Result	Notes
1st place, gold medalist(s)	Fábio Resende Baptista	Brazil	2.14	
2nd place, silver medalist(s)	Éderson Paulo Lopes de Oliveira	Brazil	2.05	
3rd place, bronze medalist(s)	Daniel Rodríguez	Venezuela	2.00	
4	Francisco Castro	Chile	1.95	
5	Jackson Valero	Venezuela	1.95	
6	Cristián Herrera	Chile	1.90	

=== Pole vault ===
Final – 27 June

Rank	Name	Nationality	Result	Notes
1st place, gold medalist(s)	Jorge Naranjo	Chile	5.20	
2nd place, silver medalist(s)	José Francisco Nava	Chile	5.00	
3rd place, bronze medalist(s)	Guillermo Chiaraviglio	Argentina	5.00	
4	Daniel Vitor Matias Gabriel	Brazil	4.80	
5	César González	Venezuela	4.55	
6	Rafael Nascimento da Encarnação	Brazil	4.40	
7	Alberto Domoromo	Venezuela	4.20	

=== Long jump ===
Final – 26 June

Rank	Name	Nationality	Result	Notes
1st place, gold medalist(s)	Irving Saladino	Panama	7.74 (-0.2 m/s)	
2nd place, silver medalist(s)	Rogério da Silva Bispo	Brazil	7.69 (+1.8 m/s)	
3rd place, bronze medalist(s)	Luis Tristán	Peru	7.25 (-0.8 m/s)	
4	Orlando Acosta	Venezuela	7.16 (+0.0 m/s)	
5	Luis Rodríguez	Venezuela	7.08 (+0.0 m/s)	
6	José Francisco Nava	Chile	6.94 (-1.0 m/s)	
7	Óscar Alvarenga	Paraguay	6.90 w (+2.1 m/s)	
8	Felipe Moreno	Colombia	6.70 (-1.4 m/s)	
9	Hugo Chila	Ecuador	6.66 (-1.0 m/s)	

=== Triple jump ===
Final – 26 June

Rank	Name	Nationality	Result	Notes
1st place, gold medalist(s)	Jefferson Dias Sabino	Brazil	16.27 (-1.3 m/s)	
2nd place, silver medalist(s)	José Francisco Nava	Chile	14.85 (-2.2 m/s)	
3rd place, bronze medalist(s)	Óscar Alvarenga	Paraguay	14.70 (-1.5 m/s)	
4	Francisco Castro	Chile	14.63 (-1.2 m/s)	
5	Luis Rodríguez	Venezuela	14.09 (-1.8 m/s)	

=== Shot put ===
Final – 26 June

Rank	Name	Nationality	Result	Notes
1st place, gold medalist(s)	Gustavo Gomes de Mendonça	Brazil	17.21	
2nd place, silver medalist(s)	Carlos Jovanny García	Colombia	17.16	
3rd place, bronze medalist(s)	Edmundo Martínez	Venezuela	17.14	
4	Germán Lauro	Argentina	16.49	
5	Gonzalo Riffo	Chile	15.97	
6	José Antunez	Venezuela	15.32	
7	Juan Gurendiain	Argentina	14.92	
8	Maximiliano Alonso	Chile	13.68	

=== Discus throw ===
Final – 26 June

Rank	Name	Nationality	Result	Notes
1st place, gold medalist(s)	Héctor Hurtado	Venezuela	54.75	
2nd place, silver medalist(s)	Gustavo Gomes de Mendonça	Brazil	52.75	
3rd place, bronze medalist(s)	Germán Lauro	Argentina	50.56	
4	Flávio Barbosa da Cruz	Brazil	46.76	
5	Maximiliano Alonso	Chile	43.17	
6	Edmundo Martínez	Venezuela	42.85	
7	Carlos Jovanny García	Colombia	41.29	
	Gonzalo Riffo	Chile	NM	

=== Hammer throw ===
Final – 26 June

Rank	Name	Nationality	Result	Notes
1st place, gold medalist(s)	Roberto Sáez	Chile	63.95	
2nd place, silver medalist(s)	Wagner Carvalho Domingos	Brazil	63.86	
3rd place, bronze medalist(s)	Armando dos Santos	Brazil	62.96	
4	Lucas Andino	Argentina	62.75	
5	Diego Gallardo	Chile	58.53	
6	Leandro Benetti	Argentina	57.66	
7	Pedro Múñoz	Venezuela	57.42	
8	Freiman Arias	Colombia	52.22	
9	José Ovalles	Venezuela	47.90	

=== Javelin throw ===
Final – 27 June

Rank	Name	Nationality	Result	Notes
1st place, gold medalist(s)	Alexon dos Santos Maximiano	Brazil	71.49	
2nd place, silver medalist(s)	Júlio César Miranda de Oliveira	Brazil	71.49	
3rd place, bronze medalist(s)	Arley Ibargüen	Colombia	70.05	
4	Nicolás Infante	Chile	59.83	

=== Decathlon ===
Final – 27 June

Rank	Name	Nationality	100m	LJ	SP	HJ	400m	110m H	DT	PV	JT	1500m	Points	Notes
1st place, gold medalist(s)	Leandro Peyrano	Argentina	11.22 (0.0)	6.98 (-0.3)	9.99	1.85	49.83	14.44 (0.1)	28.10	4.80	45.05	4:39.29	6993	
2nd place, silver medalist(s)	Fagner Alves Martins	Brazil	11.21 (0.0)	6.86	12.70	1.91	51.00	15.32 (0.1)	39.66				6852	
3rd place, bronze medalist(s)	Andrés Horacio Mantilla	Colombia	11.46 (0.0)	6.60 (1.8)	12.49	1.94	52.39	15.14 (0.1)	39.60	3.70	48.58	4:44.78	6816	
4	Gerardo Canale	Argentina	11.66 (0.0)										?	
5	Freddy Díaz	Venezuela	11.34 (0.0)	6.67 (-0.1)	10.84	1.85	50.76	15.19 (0.1)	28.51	4.20	46.84	4:30.97	6723	
6	William Alexander Valor	Venezuela	11.20 (0.0)	6.28 (0.1)	10.48	1.94	49.68	17.07 (0.1)	28.35	4.00	47.77	4:37.80	6474	
	Carlos Eduardo Bezerra Chinin	Brazil	11.37 (0.0)										DNF	

=== 20,000 meters walk ===
Final – 27 June

Rank	Name	Nationality	Time	Notes
1st place, gold medalist(s)	Gustavo Restrepo	Colombia	1:26:59.60	
2nd place, silver medalist(s)	Rafael dos Anjos Duarte	Brazil	1:27:19.85	
3rd place, bronze medalist(s)	Xavier Malacatus	Ecuador	1:31:06.42	
4	Dionisio Neyra	Peru	1:34:07.89	
5	Alex Jara	Chile	1:34:32.85	
6	Fillol Bayona	Venezuela	1:35:42.86	
7	Mario Romero	Venezuela	1:39:18.93	
8	Cristián Bascuñan	Chile	1:41:01.04	

=== 4x100 meters relay ===
Guest Final – 27 June

Rank	Nation	Competitors	Time	Notes
1	Netherlands Antilles	Geronimo Goeloe; Charlton Raffaela; Jairo Duzant; Churandy Martina	39.18	
2	Dominican Republic	Juan Encarnación; Luis Morillo; Juan Sainfleur; Joel Báez	39.84	
3	Venezuela	Marlean Reina; Andre Brown/ (Trinidad and Tobago); Edwin Villot; Cristián Jonis Sevilla	41.54	

Final – 27 June

Rank	Nation	Competitors	Time	Notes
1st place, gold medalist(s)	Brazil	Eliézer de Almeida; Paulo Roberto Orlando; Basílio de Morães; Bruno Pacheco	39.42	
2nd place, silver medalist(s)	Colombia	Wilmer Murillo; Jhon Valoyes; Daniel Grueso; Eduar Mena	40.24	
3rd place, bronze medalist(s)	Chile	Iván Sandoval; Kael Becerra; Diego Valdés; Benjamín Bravo	41.07	
4	Ecuador	Francisco Aguirre; Andrés Gallegos; Marco Rivadeneira; Franklin Nazareno	41.73	
5	Argentina	Pablo Cabrera; Sebastián Lasquera; Mariano Jiménez; José Ignacio Pignataro	41.75	
6	Venezuela	Carlos Silva; Jorge Querales; Gustavo Montalvo; Wilmer Rivas	41.76	

=== 4x400 meters relay ===
Final – 27 June

Rank	Nation	Competitors	Time	Notes
	Trinidad and Tobago	Simon Pierre; Damion Barry; Sherridan Kirk; Ato Stephens	3:05.55	guest
1st place, gold medalist(s)	Brazil	Luis Eduardo Ambrósio; Diego Chargal Diniz Gomes; Diego Venâncio; Paulo Roberto Orlando	3:06.85	
2nd place, silver medalist(s)	Venezuela	José Faneite; Simoncito Silvera; Víctor Solarte; Luis Luna	3:09.00	
3rd place, bronze medalist(s)	Argentina	Sebastián Lasquera; Mariano Jiménez; Pablo Cabrera; José Ignacio Pignataro	3:12.02	
4	Ecuador		3:13.27	
5	Chile	Cristopher Duvinguelo; Benjamín Bravo; Cristián Reyes; Francisco Schilling	3:13.79	
6	Colombia	José Arlex Ruíz; Guillermo Padilla; Wilmer Murillo; Jhon Valoyes	3:15.65	

== Women's results ==
=== 100 meters ===
Heats – 26 June
Wind: Heat 1: 0.0 m/s, Heat 2: 0.0 m/s

Rank	Heat	Name	Nationality	Time	Notes
1	1	Thatiana Regina Ignácio	Brazil	11.66	Q
	1	Virgil Hodge	Saint Kitts and Nevis	11.85	guest
2	2	Raquel Camillo da Costa	Brazil	11.87	Q
	1	Yomara Hinestroza	Colombia	11.91	guest
3	2	Daniela Pávez	Chile	11.92	Q
4	2	Melisa Murillo	Colombia	11.96	Q
	2	Carol Clarke	Saint Kitts and Nevis	11.97	guest
5	1	Daniela Riderelli	Chile	12.12	Q
6	1	Liliana Tantucci	Argentina	12.20	Q
7	1	María Ochoa	Venezuela	12.54	q
8	2	Jackeline Carabalí	Venezuela	12.54	q

Final – 26 June
Wind: +0.0 m/s

Rank	Name	Nationality	Time	Notes
1st place, gold medalist(s)	Thatiana Regina Ignácio	Brazil	11.63	
2nd place, silver medalist(s)	Melisa Murillo	Colombia	11.78	
3rd place, bronze medalist(s)	Raquel Camillo da Costa	Brazil	11.86	
4	Daniela Pávez	Chile	11.91	
5	Liliana Tantucci	Argentina	12.20	
6	Jackeline Carabalí	Venezuela	12.26	
7	Daniela Riderelli	Chile	12.32	
8	María Ochoa	Venezuela	12.62	

=== 200 meters ===
Heats – 27 June
Wind: Heat 1: 0.0 m/s, Heat 2: 0.0 m/s

Rank	Heat	Name	Nationality	Time	Notes
	2	Tiandra Ponteen	Saint Kitts and Nevis	23.75	guest
1	2	Darlenys Obregón	Colombia	24.09	Q
2	1	María José Echeverría	Chile	24.54	Q
3	2	María Fernanda Mackenna	Chile	24.74	Q
4	1	Amanda Fontes Dias	Brazil	24.76	Q
	1	Nathandra John	Saint Kitts and Nevis	24.77	guest
5	2	Ángela Alfonso	Venezuela	25.15	Q
6	2	Liliana Tantucci	Argentina	26.65	Q
7	2	Alessandra Matos Joaquim	Brazil	25.69	q
8	1	Jackeline Carabalí	Venezuela	25.77	q
	1	Juliana Crespo	Argentina	DNF	

Final – 27 June
Wind: +0.0 m/s

Rank	Name	Nationality	Time	Notes
1st place, gold medalist(s)	Darlenys Obregón	Colombia	23.76	
2nd place, silver medalist(s)	María Fernanda Mackenna	Chile	24.47	
3rd place, bronze medalist(s)	Amanda Fontes Dias	Brazil	24.55	
4	Ángela Alfonso	Venezuela	24.61	
5	María José Echeverría	Chile	24.70	
6	Jackeline Carabalí	Venezuela	25.36	
7	Alessandra Matos Joaquim	Brazil	26.39	
	Liliana Tantucci	Argentina	DNF	

=== 400 meters ===
Heats – 26 June

Rank	Heat	Name	Nationality	Time	Notes
	2	Lucy Jaramillo	Ecuador	54.73	Q
	1	Joyce Chagas Prieto	Brazil	54.87	Q
	1	María Alejandra Idrovo	Colombia	55.00	guest
	2	Ángela Alfonso	Venezuela	55.02	Q
	1	Yusmelys García	Venezuela	56.34	Q

Final – 27 June

Rank	Name	Nationality	Time	Notes
1st place, gold medalist(s)	Joyce Chagas Prieto	Brazil	54.38	
2nd place, silver medalist(s)	Lucy Jaramillo	Ecuador	54.52	
3rd place, bronze medalist(s)	Ángela Alfonso	Venezuela	54.77	
4	Yusmelys García	Venezuela	56.50	
5	Marli de Lima Pereira	Brazil	56.55	
6	Juliana Crespo	Argentina	57.45	

=== 800 meters ===
Final – 27 June

Rank	Name	Nationality	Time	Notes
1st place, gold medalist(s)	Rejane Bispo da Silva	Brazil	2:09.88	
2nd place, silver medalist(s)	Marcela Britos	Uruguay	2:10.14	
3rd place, bronze medalist(s)	Yenny Mejías	Venezuela	2:10.15	
4	Kamila Govorcín	Chile	2:12.43	
5	Berlín Marrero	Venezuela	2:13.00	

=== 1500 meters ===
Final – 26 June

Rank	Name	Nationality	Time	Notes
1st place, gold medalist(s)	Mónica Amboya	Ecuador	4:27.30	
	Jéssica Quispe	Peru	4:27.68	guest
2nd place, silver medalist(s)	Kamila Govorcín	Chile	4:33.05	
3rd place, bronze medalist(s)	Yolanda Caballero	Colombia	4:37.62	
4	Rejane Bispo da Silva	Brazil	4:37.70	
5	Ángela Figueroa	Colombia	4:44.36	
6	Berlín Marrero	Venezuela	5:07.56	

=== 5000 meters ===
Final – 27 June

Rank	Name	Nationality	Time	Notes
1st place, gold medalist(s)	Zenaide Vieira	Brazil	17:37.28	
2nd place, silver medalist(s)	Rosa Chacha	Ecuador	17:44.04	
3rd place, bronze medalist(s)	Karina Córdoba	Argentina	17:47.34	
4	Ruby Riativa	Colombia	17:48.86	
5	Geisi Álvarez	Venezuela	18:15.57	
6	Gabriela da Costa Oliveira	Brazil	18:33.15	
7	Susana Vergara	Chile	18:48.50	
8	Yolimar Pineda	Venezuela	18:55.44	

=== 10,000 meters ===
Final – 26 June

Rank	Name	Nationality	Time	Notes
1st place, gold medalist(s)	Rosa Chacha	Ecuador	36:23.73	
2nd place, silver medalist(s)	Ruby Riativa	Colombia	36:28.67	
3rd place, bronze medalist(s)	Luz Maldonado	Venezuela	36:42.10	
4	Gabriela da Costa Oliveira	Brazil	38:55.91	
5	Susana Vergara	Chile	39:16.02	
	Débora Gomes Ferraz	Brazil	DNF	

=== 3000 meters steeplechase ===
Final – 27 June

Rank	Name	Nationality	Time	Notes
1st place, gold medalist(s)	Mónica Amboya	Ecuador	10:20.39	
2nd place, silver medalist(s)	Yolanda Caballero	Colombia	10:24.09	
3rd place, bronze medalist(s)	Ángela Figueroa	Colombia	10:39.12	

=== 100 meters hurdles ===
Heats – 26 June
Wind: Heat 1: +0.0 m/s, Heat 2: -1.5 m/s

Rank	Heat	Name	Nationality	Time	Notes
	1	Briggite Merlano	Colombia	13.79	Q
	1	Sandrine Legenort	Venezuela	14.11	Q
	2	Fabiana Morães	Brazil	14.17	Q
	2	Ada Hernández	Venezuela	14.22	Q
	2	Karina Quejada	Colombia	14.27	Q
	2	Alejandra Llorente	Argentina	14.27	q

Final – 26 June
Wind: -0.9 m/s

Rank	Name	Nationality	Time	Notes
1st place, gold medalist(s)	Briggite Merlano	Colombia	13.57	
2nd place, silver medalist(s)	Sandrine Legenort	Venezuela	13.79	
3rd place, bronze medalist(s)	Fabiana Morães	Brazil	14.11	
4	Mónica Nascimento	Brazil	14.17	
5	Alejandra Llorente	Argentina	14.28	
6	Karina Quejada	Colombia	14.29	
7	Ada Hernández	Venezuela	14.32	

=== 400 meters hurdles ===
Final – 27 June

Rank	Name	Nationality	Time	Notes
1st place, gold medalist(s)	Yusmelys García	Venezuela	59.80	
2nd place, silver medalist(s)	Jéssica Miller	Uruguay	59.84	
3rd place, bronze medalist(s)	Lucy Jaramillo	Ecuador	1:00.65	
4	?			
5	Oneida Céspedes	Venezuela	1:02.44	

=== High jump ===
Final – 27 June

Rank	Name	Nationality	Attempts										Result	Notes
Rank	Name	Nationality	1.65	1.70	1.73	1.76	1.79	1.82	1.85	1.88	1.91	1.94	Result	Notes
1st place, gold medalist(s)	Caterine Ibargüen	Colombia	-	-	-	o	-	o	o	o	o	xxx	1.91	
2nd place, silver medalist(s)	Jhoris Luque	Venezuela	-	o	o	o	o	xxo	xxx				1.82	
3rd place, bronze medalist(s)	Mônica Araújo de Freitas	Brazil											1.76	
4	Márcia Regina Evers	Brazil											1.76	
5	Verónica Davis	Venezuela	o	o	o	xxx							1.73	

=== Pole vault ===
Final – 27 June

Rank	Name	Nationality	Result	Notes
1st place, gold medalist(s)	Milena Agudelo	Colombia	3.90	
	Keisa Monterola	Venezuela	3.80	guest
2nd place, silver medalist(s)	Pamela Barnert	Chile	3.80	
3rd place, bronze medalist(s)	Rosângela da Silva	Brazil	3.70	
4	Ivanova Zurita	Venezuela	3.60	
5	Patrícia Gabriela dos Santos	Brazil	3.30	

=== Long jump ===
Final – 27 June

Rank	Name	Nationality	Result	Notes
1st place, gold medalist(s)	Keila da Silva Costa	Brazil	6.19 (+1.6 m/s)	
2nd place, silver medalist(s)	Caterine Ibargüen	Colombia	6.05 (+0.9 m/s)	
3rd place, bronze medalist(s)	Tânia Ferreira da Silva	Brazil	6.05 (-0.7 m/s)	
4	Macarena Reyes	Chile	6.00 (-1.6 m/s)	
5	Jennifer Arveláez	Venezuela	5.91 (+2.0 m/s)	
6	Daniela Coronel	Venezuela	5.80 (+0.8 m/s)	
7	Alejandra Llorente	Argentina	5.79 (+1.2 m/s)	
8	Natalhie Patiño	Argentina	5.67 (+2.0 m/s)	

=== Triple jump ===
Final – 26 June

Rank	Name	Nationality	Result	Notes
1st place, gold medalist(s)	Keila da Silva Costa	Brazil	13.62 (+0.3 m/s)	
2nd place, silver medalist(s)	Jennifer Arveláez	Venezuela	13.16 (+0.9 m/s)	
3rd place, bronze medalist(s)	Tânia Ferreira da Silva	Brazil	12.78 w (+2.2 m/s)	
4	Daisy Ugarte	Bolivia	12.68 (+0.5 m/s)	
5	Marielis Rojas	Venezuela	12.59 (+1.6 m/s)	
6	Macarena Reyes	Chile	12.27 (+1.0 m/s)	
7	Natalhie Patiño	Argentina	11.97 (+0.7 m/s)	
8	Alejandra Llorente	Argentina	11.71 (+0.8 m/s)	

=== Shot put ===
Final – 26 June

Rank	Name	Nationality	Result	Notes
1st place, gold medalist(s)	Paola Cheppi	Argentina	15.81	
2nd place, silver medalist(s)	Ahymará Espinoza	Venezuela	15.45	
3rd place, bronze medalist(s)	Jennifer Dahlgren	Argentina	14.34	
4	Leidy Arboleda	Colombia	14.22	
5	Regiane Rodrigues Alves	Brazil	13.73	
6	Rosa Rodríguez	Venezuela	13.33	
7	Anna Paula Magalhães Pereira	Brazil	12.77	
8	Valeria Steffens	Chile	11.75	

=== Discus throw ===
Final – 26 June

Rank	Name	Nationality	Result	Notes
1st place, gold medalist(s)	Claudia Ullman	Argentina	44.54	
2nd place, silver medalist(s)	Karen Gallardo	Chile	44.00	
3rd place, bronze medalist(s)	Rita da Conceição Neres	Brazil	43.70	
4	Karina Díaz	Ecuador	43.50	
5	Leidy Arboleda	Colombia	42.72	
6	Jennifer Dahlgren	Argentina	42.62	
7	Rosa Rodríguez	Venezuela	42.55	
8	Liliane Menezes Lacerda	Brazil	39.94	
9	Johana Ramírez	Colombia	37.92	

=== Hammer throw ===
Final – 27 June

Rank	Name	Nationality	Result	Notes
1st place, gold medalist(s)	Jennifer Dahlgren	Argentina	65.17	
2nd place, silver medalist(s)	Adriana Benaventa	Venezuela	59.18	
3rd place, bronze medalist(s)	Stefania Zoryez	Uruguay	58.22	
4	Odette Palma	Chile	57.55	
5	Rosa Rodríguez	Venezuela	55.98	
6	Johana Ramírez	Colombia	54.95	
7	Fabiana Alves dos Santos	Brazil	53.14	
8	Alessandra Mota Peixoto	Brazil	52.59	
9	Karina Díaz	Ecuador	49.25	

=== Javelin throw ===
Final – 27 June

Rank	Name	Nationality	Result	Notes
1st place, gold medalist(s)	Leryn Franco	Paraguay	51.53	
2nd place, silver medalist(s)	María González	Venezuela	51.01	
3rd place, bronze medalist(s)	Mariela Aguer	Argentina	45.99	
4	Jurema de Souza César	Brazil	42.40	
5	Thais Ravazi de Souza	Brazil	40.56	
6	Valeria Steffens	Chile	33.98	

=== Heptathlon ===
Final – 27 June

Rank	Name	Nationality	100m H	HJ	SP	200m	LJ	JT	800m	Points	Notes
1st place, gold medalist(s)	Thaimara Rivas	Venezuela	14.72 (0.0)	1.75	12.66	25.56 (0.0)	5.97 (1.1)	39.55	2:29.31	5.537	
2nd place, silver medalist(s)	Merli Caldeira	Brazil	14.92 (0.0)	1.63	12.45	25.01 (0.0)	5.91 (0.4)	32.90	2:32.32	5.218	
3rd place, bronze medalist(s)	Valeria Steffens	Chile	15.73 (0.0)	1.63	12.45	26.14 (0.0)	5.30 (1.5)	36.80	2:25.00	5.001	
4	Daniela Crespo	Argentina	16.05 (0.0)	1.78						?	
	María de la Paz Azzato	Argentina	14.59 (0.0)	1.54						?	
	Katiuscia Moreira Venâncio	Brazil	15.54 (0.0)	1.69						?	
	Glenis Pino	Colombia	15.59 (0.0)	1.63						?	
	Victoria Quiñones	Ecuador	16.18 (0.0)	1.57						?	

=== 20,000 meters walk ===
Final – 26 June

Rank	Name	Nationality	Time	Notes
1st place, gold medalist(s)	Cisiane Dutra Lopes	Brazil	1:46:45.03	
2nd place, silver medalist(s)	Marcela Pacheco	Chile	1:47:37.12	
3rd place, bronze medalist(s)	Josette Sepúlveda	Chile	1:48:56.46	
4	Nayiri Rosales	Venezuela	1:52:11.45	
5	Juvelitza Valera	Venezuela	1:53:23.75	
6	Ruth Riativa	Colombia	2:01:51.69	

=== 4x100 meters relay ===
Guest Final – 26 June

Rank	Nation	Competitors	Time	Notes
1	Colombia	Melisa Murillo; Felipa Palacios; Darlenys Obregón; Norma González	43.46	
2	Brazil	Kátia de Jesus Santos; Lucimar Moura; Rosemar Coelho Neto; Luciana Alves dos Santos	43.49	
3	Trinidad and Tobago	Keenan Gibson; Fana Ashby; Kimberly Walker; Ayanna Hutchinson	43.89	
4	Saint Kitts and Nevis	Nathandra John; Tiandra Ponteen; Carol Clarke; Virgil Hodge	45.46	

Final – 27 June

Rank	Nation	Competitors	Time	Notes
1st place, gold medalist(s)	Brazil	Alessandra Matos Joaquim; Racquel Camillo da Costa; Amanda Fontes Dias; Thatiana Regina Ignácio	45.36	
2nd place, silver medalist(s)	Chile	María José Echeverría; María Fernanda Mackenna; Daniela Pávez; Daniela Riderelli	45.67	
3rd place, bronze medalist(s)	Venezuela	Jackeline Carabalí; Ángela Alfonso; María Mercedes Ochoa; Sandrine Legenort	47.32	
4	Argentina		47.51	

=== 4x400 meters relay ===
Final – 27 June

Rank	Nation	Competitors	Time	Notes
1st place, gold medalist(s)	Brazil		3:40.05	
2nd place, silver medalist(s)	Venezuela		3:42.61	
3rd place, bronze medalist(s)	Chile	Daniela Pávez; Daniela Riderelli; María Fernanda Mackenna; María José Echeverría	3:48.38	
4	Argentina		3:54.20	

== Note ==
The names of the Brazilian athletes were completed using the published list of participants.
