= 2002 South American Youth Championships in Athletics =

XVI South American Youth Championships in Athletics
- Dates: October 19–20
- Host city: Asunción, Paraguay
- Venue: Consejo Nacional de Deportes
- Level: Youth
- Events: 42
- Participation: about 290 athletes from 11 nations

The 16th South American Youth Championships in Athletics were held at the Consejo Nacional de Deportes (CND) in Asunción, Paraguay from October 19–20, 2002.

== Medal summary ==
Medal winners are published for boys and girls. A summary is given, and complete results can be found on the "World Junior Athletics History" website.

=== Men ===
Event	Gold		Silver		Bronze	
100 metres (wind: -1.5 m/s)	Jorge Sena (BRA)	10.76	Bruno Góes (BRA)	10.88	Andrés Rodríguez (PAN)	11.13
200 metres (wind: +3.4 m/s)	Jorge Sena (BRA)	20.93 w	Bruno Góes (BRA)	21.33 w	José Acevedo (VEN)	21.66 w
400 metres	Diego Venâncio (BRA)	47.46	José Acevedo (VEN)	48.22	Luiz de Oliveira (BRA)	48.68
800 metres	Kléberson Davide (BRA)	1:57.53	Luis Chaparro (ARG)	1:58.06	César Vivas (COL)	1:58.32
1500 metres	César Vivas (COL)	4:06.18	Éder da Silva (BRA)	4:06.92	Luis Chaparro (ARG)	4:07.26
3000 metres	Sandro da Silva (BRA)	8:53.61	Pedro Ramos (ECU)	8:54.77	John Cusi (PER)	9:03.19
2000 metres steeplechase	Sandro da Silva (BRA)	6:10.51	Gerardo Bonsegundo (ARG)	6:12.09	Fabiano Silva (BRA)	6:21.05
110 metres hurdles (wind: -1.9 m/s)	Rodrigo Pereira (BRA)	13.59	Andrés Silva (URU)	14.26	Daivison da Silva (BRA)	14.48
400 metres hurdles	Diego Venâncio (BRA)	53.42	Víctor Solarte (VEN)	54.24	Daivison da Silva (BRA)	54.60
High jump	Ederson de Oliveira (BRA)	1.96	Welerson Lopes (BRA)	1.96	Leandro Piedrabuena (ARG)	1.93
Pole vault	Germán Chiaraviglio (ARG)	4.75	Evandro Sanches (BRA)	4.70	César González (VEN)	4.50
Long jump	Daniel Pineda (CHI)	7.28 w	Francisco Wellmann (CHI)	7.03 w	Rudan de Carvalho (BRA)	6.82 w
Triple jump	Danilo Xavier (BRA)	14.39 w	José Luis Pesántez (ECU)	14.32 w	Marcos da Silva (BRA)	14.31 w
Shot put	Leandro Cheppi (ARG)	17.26	Ulises de la Fuente (ARG)	16.97	Ronald Julião (BRA)	16.80
Discus throw	Reginaldo Diógenes (BRA)	53.47	Gabriel Hugo (ECU)	48.73	Julio Nigrelli (ARG)	46.79
Hammer throw	Max dos Santos (BRA)	61.05	Tomás Angosto (CHI)	59.13	João Bressan (BRA)	58.06
Javelin throw	Júlio César de Oliveira (BRA)	61.68	Carlos Prada (CHI)	60.14	Víctor Fatecha (PAR)	59.91
Octathlon	Andrés Silva (URU)	5928	Sinval de Oliveira (BRA)	5645	Pablo Cabrera (ARG)	5564
10,000 metres track walk	Carlos Borgoño (CHI)	46:10.80	Oswaldo Ortega (ECU)	46:30.22	James Rendón (COL)	47:08.38
4 × 100 metres relay	Brazil; Daniel Herrmann; Rafael da Silva; Bruno Góes; Jorge Sena	40.9	Chile; Daniel Pineda; Roberto Cortés; Cristián Reyes; Benjamín Bravo	41.4	Bolivia; Jhony Ortíz; Cecilio Flores; Miguel Pessoa; José Roca	42.3
1000 metres Medley relay	Brazil; Diego Venâncio; Jorge Sena; Bruno Góes; Rafael da Silva	1:51.65	Chile; Cristián Reyes; Roberto Cortés; Benjamín Bravo; Daniel Pineda	1:57.04	Paraguay; Nelson Cardozo; Edgar Galeano; Nicolás López; Alfonso Moreira	1:57.99

=== Women ===
Event	Gold		Silver		Bronze	
100 metres (wind: -0.7 m/s)	Evelyn dos Santos (BRA)	12.19	Darlenis Obregón (COL)	12.23	Yomara Hinestroza (COL)	12.46
200 metres (wind: +3.3 m/s)	Evelyn dos Santos (BRA)	24.18 w	Darlenis Obregón (COL)	24.44 w	Fernanda Mackenna (CHI)	25.02 w
400 metres	Emmily Pinheiro (BRA)	56.58	María Londoño (VEN)	57.78	Higlécia de Oliveira (BRA)	58.05
800 metres	María Emilia Galante (ARG); Natalia Siviero (ARG)	2:16.39			Gisiane Bertoni (BRA)	2:17.22
1500 metres	Carolina González (COL)	4:42.68	Yulibeth Páez (VEN)	4:44.93	Inés Melchor (PER)	4:44.94
3000 metres	Inés Melchor (PER)	10:19.43	Militza Saucedo (BOL)	10:21.99	Michele das Chagas (BRA)	10:23.35
2000 metres steeplechase	Yulibeth Páez (VEN)	7:13.31	Sabine Heitling (BRA)	7:13.65	Sofía Vial (CHI)	7:26.62
100 metres hurdles (wind: -1.5 m/s)	Lucimara da Silva (BRA)	14.54	Jessica Miller (URU)	14.69	Macarena Vergara (CHI)	14.86
400 metres hurdles	Jessica Miller (URU)	60.45	Maria da Costa (BRA)	60.52	Higlécia de Oliveira (BRA)	62.68
High jump	Jailma de Lima (BRA)	1.72	Érica Ribeiro (BRA)	1.66	Marielys Rojas (VEN)	1.66
Pole vault	Milena Agudelo (COL)	3.90	Michaela Heitkotter (BRA)	3.80	Alexandra de Oliveira (BRA)	3.30
Long jump	Nathalie Patiño (ARG)	6.17 w	Lucimara da Silva (BRA)	5.90 w	Kauiza Venâncio (BRA)	5.77 w
Triple jump	Maria da Costa (BRA)	12.23	Nathalie Patiño (ARG)	12.18	Marielys Rojas (VEN)	11.90 w
Shot put	Ahymará Espinoza (VEN)	13.93	Juliana Olier (COL)	13.29	Rosa Rodríguez (VEN)	13.26
Discus throw	Rosa Rodríguez (VEN)	43.87	Johana Moreno (COL)	41.34	Rocío Comba (ARG)	39.98
Hammer throw	Rosa Rodríguez (VEN)	53.75	Johana Moreno (COL)	49.63	Natalia Iturriaga (CHI)	41.95
Javelin throw	Mariela Aguer (ARG)	46.99	Leidy Arboleda (COL)	40.66	Lisângela da Cruz (BRA)	40.21
Heptathlon	Jailma de Lima (BRA)	4679	María Azzato (ARG)	4474	Tamiris Delfino (BRA)	4346
5000 metres track walk	Johana Malla (ECU)	24:57.42	Johana Ordóñez (ECU)	25:12.72	Luz Villamarín (COL)	25:21.93
4 × 100 metres relay	Brazil; Maria da Costa; Tânia da Silva; Fernanda de Melo; Evelyn dos Santos	47.3	Colombia; Diana Castro; Yeimi Sepúlveda; Darlenis Obregón; Yomara Hinestroza	47.3	Argentina; Natahalie Patiño; María Soledad Trossero; Camila Moyano; Veronica Barraza	48.7
1000 metres Medley relay	Colombia; Yomara Hinestroza; Dinelba Hinestroza; Fanny Montaño; Darlenis Obregón	2:13.94	Brazil; Emmily Pinheiro; Debora Savoldi; Evelyn dos Santos; Tânia da Silva	2:14.55	Chile; Fernanda MacKenna; Cinthya Del Rio; Javiera Escobedo; Camila Garcés	2:15.83

== Medal table (unofficial) ==
* Host nation (Paraguay)

Rank	Nation	Gold	Silver	Bronze	Total
1	Brazil (BRA)	23	12	16	51
2	Argentina (ARG)	6	5	6	17
3	Colombia (COL)	4	7	4	15
4	Venezuela (VEN)	4	4	5	13
5	Chile (CHI)	2	5	5	12
6	Uruguay (URU)	2	2	0	4
7	Ecuador (ECU)	1	5	0	6
8	Peru (PER)	1	0	2	3
9	Bolivia (BOL)	0	1	1	2
10	Paraguay (PAR)*	0	0	2	2
11	Panama (PAN)	0	0	1	1
Totals (11 entries)		43	41	42	126

== Participation (unofficial) ==
Detailed result lists can be found on the "World Junior Athletics History" website. An unofficial count yields the number of about 290 athletes from 11 countries:

- Argentina (58)
- Bolivia (15)
- Brazil (64)
- Chile (40)
- Colombia (18)
- Ecuador (19)
- Panama (1)
- Paraguay (31)
- Peru (12)
- Uruguay (13)
- Venezuela (19)
