= María González (javelin thrower) =

Venezuelan javelin thrower

María de los Angeles González Tuarez (born 28 March 1982 in Guatire, Miranda) is a retired Venezuelan athlete who specialised in the javelin throw. She represented her country at the 2008 Summer Olympics failing to qualify for the final.

Her personal best in the event is 54.75 metres, set in 2008. This is the current national record.

== Competition record ==
Year	Competition	Venue	Position	Event	Notes
Representing Venezuela
1999	South American Junior Championships	Concepción, Chile	4th	Javelin throw	41.39 m
2000	South American Junior Championships	São Leopoldo, Brazil	2nd	Javelin throw	46.76 m
2001	South American Junior Championships	Santa Fe, Argentina	2nd	Javelin throw	46.90 m
2002	Ibero-American Championships	Guatemala City, Guatemala	6th	Javelin throw	51.04 m
2003	South American Championships	Barquisimeto, Venezuela	5th	Javelin throw	50.48 m
2004	South American U23 Championships	Barquisimeto, Venezuela	2nd	Javelin	51.01 m
2008	Ibero-American Championships	Iquique, Chile	2nd	Javelin throw	53.20 m
2008	Central American and Caribbean Championships	Cali, Colombia	4th	Javelin throw	53.92 m
2008	Olympic Games	Beijing, China	48th (q)	Javelin throw	50.51 m
2009	South American Championships	Lima, Peru	4th	Javelin throw	51.75 m
