= Armando dos Santos =

Armando dos Santos may refer to:

- Armando dos Santos (bobsleigh), Brazilian bobsleigh competitor
- Armandinho (footballer) (Armando dos Santos, 1911–1972), association football player for Brazil
