= Fabiana Moraes =

Brazilian hurdler (born 1986)

Personal information
- Born: 5 June 1986 (age 40) São Paulo, Brazil
- Height: 1.70 m (5 ft 7 in)
- Weight: 55 kg (121 lb)

Sport
- Sport: Track and field
- Event: 100 metres hurdles
- Club: EC Pinheiros
- Coached by: Nelio Moura

Fabiana dos Santos Moraes (born 5 June 1986, in São Paulo) is a Brazilian athlete specialising in the sprint hurdles. She holds 10 National titles and 3 South American Titles.

She represented Brazil at the Rio 2007 Pan American Games, Toronto 2015 Pan American Games, 2015 World Championships, Portland 2016 World Indoor Championships, Rio 2016 Olympic Games, and 2017 World Championships.

Her personal bests are 12.84 seconds in 100 metres hurdles (+ 0.8 m/s, Ávila 2017) and 8.08 seconds in the 60 metres hurdles (São Caetano do Sul 2016).

== Competition record ==
| Year | Competition | Venue | Position | Event | Notes |
Representing Brazil
| 2002 | South American Youth Championships | Asunción, Paraguay | 4th | 100 m hurdles (76.2 cm) | 15.03 |
| 2004 | South American U23 Championships | Barquisimeto, Venezuela | 3rd | 100 m hurdles | 14.11 |
| 2005 | Pan American Junior Championships | Windsor, Canada | 6th | 100 m hurdles | 13.77 (w) |
| 2005 | South American Junior Championships | Rosario, Argentina | 1st | 100 m hurdles | 14.01 (w) |
| 2006 | South American Games / South American U23 Championships | Buenos Aires, Argentina | 2nd | 100 m hurdles | 14.30 |
| 2006 | Lusophony Games | Macau, China | 2nd | 100 m hurdles | 14.07 |
| 2007 | Pan American Games | Rio de Janeiro, Brazil | 12th (h) | 100 m hurdles | 13.75 |
| 2008 | Ibero-American Championships | Iquique, Chile | 5th | 100 m hurdles | 13.97 |
| 2009 | South American Championships | Lima, Peru | 3rd | 100 m hurdles | 13.56 |
| 2009 | Lusophony Games | Lisbon, Portugal | 1st | 100 m hurdles | 13.32 |
| 2013 | South American Championships | Cartagena, Colombia | 3rd | 100 m hurdles | 13.21 |
| 2014 | South American Games | Santiago, Chile | 4th | 100 m hurdles | 13.46 |
| 2014 | Ibero-American Championships | São Paulo, Brazil | 5th | 100 m hurdles | 13.28 |
| 2014 | Pan American Sports Festival | Mexico City, Mexico | 4th | 100 m hurdles | 13.20 |
| 2015 | Pan American Games | Toronto, Canada | 14th (h) | 100 m hurdles | 13.28 (w) |
| 2015 | World Championships | Beijing, China | 32nd (h) | 100 m hurdles | 13.35 |
| 2016 | World Indoor Championships | Portland, United States | 14th (h) | 60 m hurdles | 8.28 |
| 2016 | Ibero-American Championships | Rio de Janeiro, Brazil | 1st | 100 m hurdles | 12.91 |
| 2016 | Olympic Games | Rio de Janeiro, Brazil | 35th (h) | 100 m hurdles | 13.22 |
| 2017 | South American Championships | Asunción, Paraguay | 1st | 100 m hurdles | 12.86 (w) |
| 2017 | World Championships | London, United Kingdom | 36th (h) | 100 m hurdles | 13.40 |
| 2018 | South American Games | Cochabamba, Bolivia | 4th | 100 m hurdles | 13.40 |
