= Patricio Palma =

Chilean hammer thrower

Personal information
- Born: 27 October 1978 (age 46) Osorno, Chile

Sport
- Sport: Track and field

Patricio Waldemar Palma Lafourcade (born 27 October 1978) is a Chilean retired athlete who specialised in the hammer throw. He won multiple medals at the regional level. His younger sister, Odette, is also a hammer thrower.

His personal best of 70.78 meters, set in 2010, is the standing national record.

== Competition record ==
| Year | Competition | Venue | Position | Event | Notes |
Representing Chile
| 1996 | South American Junior Championships | Bucaramanga, Colombia | 2nd | Hammer throw | 50.02 m |
| 1997 | South American Junior Championships | San Carlos, Uruguay | – | Hammer throw | NM |
| 1997 | Pan American Junior Championships | Havana, Cuba | 6th | Hammer throw | 51.00 m |
| 2001 | South American Championships | Manaus, Brazil | 4th | Hammer throw | 63.26 m |
| 2002 | Ibero-American Championships | Guatemala City, Guatemala | 4th | Hammer throw | 63.93 m |
| 2003 | South American Championships | Barquisimeto, Venezuela | 4th | Hammer throw | 64.88 m |
| 2005 | South American Championships | Cali, Colombia | 3rd | Hammer throw | 67.10 m |
| 2006 | Ibero-American Championships | Ponce, Puerto Rico | 4th | Hammer throw | 65.00 m |
| 2006 | South American Championships | Tunja, Colombia | 2nd | Hammer throw | 67.30 m |
| 2007 | South American Championships | São Paulo, Brazil | 2nd | Hammer throw | 66.56 m |
| 2007 | Pan American Games | Rio de Janeiro, Brazil | 5th | Hammer throw | 67.86 m |
| 2008 | Ibero-American Championships | Iquique, Chile | 4th | Hammer throw | 67.22 m |
| 2009 | South American Championships | Lima, Peru | 2nd | Hammer throw | 68.53 m |
