= Odette Palma =

Chilean hammer thrower (born 1982)

Personal information
- Full name: Odette Palma Lafourcade
- Born: 7 August 1982 (age 43) Osorno, Los Lagos, Chile
- Height: 1.71 m (5 ft 7 in)
- Weight: 75 kg (165 lb)

Sport
- Sport: Track and field
- Coached by: Peter Farmer
Medal record
Women's athletics
Representing Chile
South American Youth Championships
Bronze medal – third place	1998 Manaus	Hammer throw
South American Championships
Silver medal – second place	2009 Lima	Hammer throw
Australian Athletics Championships
Bronze medal – third place	2021 Sydney	Hammer throw
- Updated on 28 January 2015

Odette Jeanette Chantal Palma Lafourcade (born 7 August 1982) is a Chilean athlete specializing in the hammer throw. Her brother is the athlete Patricio Palma.

== Life ==
Odette Palma was on born 7 August 1982 in Osorno. Her older brother, Patricio Palma, was also a hammer thrower.

== Career ==
Her personal best throw of 66.63 metres achieved in 2011 is the current national record.

== Competition record ==
Year	Competition	Venue	Position	Event	Notes
Representing Chile
1998	South American Junior Championships	Córdoba, Argentina	9th	Discus	30.95 m
1998	South American Junior Championships	Córdoba, Argentina	10th	Hammer	37.57 m
1998	South American Youth Championships	Manaus, Brazil	5th	Discus	32.42 m
1998	South American Youth Championships	Manaus, Brazil	3rd	Hammer	49.50 m
1999	World Youth Championships	Bydgoszcz, Poland	18th (q)	Hammer	44.67 m
1999	South American Junior Championships	Concepción, Chile	8th	Discus	36.46 m
1999	South American Junior Championships	Concepción, Chile	4th	Hammer	46.42 m
2000	Ibero-American Championships	Rio de Janeiro, Brazil	12th	Hammer	46.67 m
2000	World Junior Championships	Santiago, Chile	32nd (q)	Hammer	43.91 m
2001	South American Championships	Manaus, Brazil	6th	Hammer	51.78 m
2001	South American Junior Championships	Santa Fe, Argentina	4th	Hammer	51.03 m
2002	Ibero-American Championships	Guatemala City, Guatemala	11th	Hammer	50.65 m
2003	South American Championships	Barquisimeto, Venezuela	4th	Hammer	58.19 m
2003	Pan American Games	Santo Domingo, Dominican Republic	10th	Hammer	54.14 m
2003	Universiade	Daegu, South Korea	19th	Hammer	50.53 m
2004	South American U23 Championships	Barquisimeto, Venezuela	4th	Hammer	57.55 m
2004	Ibero-American Championships	Huelva, Spain	15th	Hammer	53.98 m
2005	South American Championships	Cali, Colombia	6th	Hammer	59.60 m
2005	Universiade	İzmir, Turkey	14th (q)	Hammer	59.61 m
2006	South American Championships	Tunja, Colombia	6th	Hammer	57.41 m
2007	South American Championships	São Paulo, Brazil	6th	Hammer	56.74 m
2007	Pan American Games	Rio de Janeiro, Brazil	13th	Hammer	55.63 m
2008	Ibero-American Championships	Iquique, Chile	5th	Hammer	60.19 m
2009	South American Championships	Lima, Peru	7th	Discus	40.46 m
2009	South American Championships	Lima, Peru	2nd	Hammer	64.55 m
2010	Ibero-American Championships	San Fernando, Spain	6th	Hammer	60.49 m
2011	South American Championships	Buenos Aires, Argentina	5th	Hammer	60.83 m
2011	Pan American Games	Guadalajara, Mexico	7th	Hammer	64.79 m
2013	South American Championships	Cartagena, Colombia	4th	Hammer	61.83 m
2013	Bolivarian Games	Trujillo, Peru	4th	Hammer	60.53 m
2014	South American Games	Santiago, Chile	5th	Hammer	58.03 m
2014	Ibero-American Championships	São Paulo, Brazil	7th	Hammer	58.05 m
2014	Pan American Sports Festival	Mexico City, Mexico	9th	Hammer	56.67m
2021	Australian Athletics Championships	Sydney Olympic Park, Australia	3rd	Hammer	54.75
