= María Cubillán =

Venezuelan discus thrower (born 1981)

María Angélica Cubillán Chourio (born 22 April 1981) is a Venezuelan athlete specialising in the discus throw. She won several medals at the regional level.

Her personal best of 55.57 metres (2009) is the current national record.

== Competition record ==
Year	Competition	Venue	Position	Event	Notes
Representing Venezuela
1996	South American Youth Championships	Asunción, Paraguay	1st	Discus	39.02 m
1997	South American Junior Championships	San Carlos, Uruguay	1st	Discus	42.66 m
1998	South American Junior Championships	Córdoba, Argentina	2nd	Discus	44.11 m
1999	Central American and Caribbean Championships	Bridgetown, Barbados	1st	Discus	42.08 m
2000	South American Junior Championships	São Leopoldo, Brazil	2nd	Discus	44.49 m
2003	South American Championships	Barquisimeto, Venezuela	3rd	Discus	50.47 m
2003	Central American and Caribbean Championships	St. George's, Grenada	2nd	Discus	49.05 m
2008	Ibero-American Championships	Iquique, Chile	4th	Discus	52.11 m
2008	Central American and Caribbean Championships	Cali, Colombia	4th	Discus	50.62 m
2009	South American Championships	Lima, Peru	3rd	Discus	54.07 m
2009	Central American and Caribbean Championships	Havana, Cuba	3rd	Discus	55.57 m
2010	Ibero-American Championships	San Fernando, Spain	7th	Discus	52.39 m
2010	Central American and Caribbean Games	Mayagüez, Puerto Rico	1st	Discus	52.21 m
2011	Central American and Caribbean Championships	Mayagüez, Puerto Rico	5th	Discus	52.13 m
2012	Ibero-American Championships	Barquisimeto, Venezuela	7th	Discus	51.24 m
2013	South American Championships	Cartagena, Colombia	8th	Discus	49.86 m
