= Jefferson Sabino =

Brazilian triple jumper

Jefferson Sabino OLY
Personal information
- Full name: Jefferson Dias Sabino
- Nationality: Brazil
- Born: November 4, 1982 (age 44) Guarulhos, São Paulo
- Height: 1.92 m (6 ft 4 in)
- Weight: 94 kg (207 lb)

Sport
- Sport: Athletics
- Event: Triple jump
Medal record
Men's athletics
Representing Brazil
Pan American Games
Bronze medal – third place	2011 Guadalajara	Triple jump
South American Youth Championships
Silver medal – second place	1998 Manaus	Triple jump
Military World Games
Gold medal – first place	2011 Rio de Janeiro	Triple jump
- Updated on 5 May 2014

Jefferson Dias Sabino (born 4 November 1982 in Guarulhos, São Paulo) is a Brazilian triple jumper.

== Career ==
He finished sixth at the 2005 Summer Universiade and fourth at the 2007 Pan American Games. He also competed at the 2006 World Indoor Championships and the 2007 World Championships without reaching the final.

His personal best jump is 17.28 metres, achieved in April 2008 in São Paulo.

== Personal bests ==
=== Outdoor ===
- Long jump: 7.67 m (wind: +1.7 m/s) – (Brazil) São Paulo, 13 July 2004
- Triple jump: 17.28 m (wind: +1.5 m/s) – (Brazil) São Paulo, 25 April 2008

== Competition record ==
Year	Competition	Venue	Position	Event	Notes
Representing Brazil
1998	South American Youth Championships	Manaus, Brazil	6th	Pole vault	3.40 m
1998	South American Youth Championships	Manaus, Brazil	2nd	Triple jump	13.71 m
2000	South American Junior Championships	São Leopoldo, Brazil	3rd	Triple jump	15.49 m (w)
2000	World Junior Championships	Santiago, Chile	29th (q)	Long jump	6.94 m (wind: -0.5 m/s)
2000	World Junior Championships	Santiago, Chile	17th (q)	Triple jump	15.48 m (wind: -1.4 m/s)
2001	South American Junior Championships	Santa Fe, Argentina	2nd	Long jump	7.25 m (w)
2001	South American Junior Championships	Santa Fe, Argentina	1st	Triple jump	15.56 m
2001	Pan American Junior Championships	Santa Fe, Argentina	7th	Long jump	6.90 m
2001	Pan American Junior Championships	Santa Fe, Argentina	2nd	Triple jump	15.89 m
2004	South American U23 Championships	Barquisimeto, Venezuela	1st	Triple jump	16.27 m (wind: -1.3 m/s)
2004	Ibero-American Championships	Huelva, Spain	3rd	Triple jump	16.16 m
2005	South American Championships	Cali, Colombia	1st	Triple jump	16.24 m
2005	Universiade	İzmir, Turkey	6th	Triple jump	16.39 m
2006	World Indoor Championships	Moscow, Russia	16th (q)	Triple jump	16.55 m
2006	Ibero-American Championships	Ponce, Puerto Rico	1st	Triple jump	16.81 m
2006	South American Championships	Tunja, Colombia	5th	Triple jump	15.45 m (w)
2007	South American Championships	São Paulo, Brazil	1st	Triple jump	16.68 m
2007	Pan American Games	Rio de Janeiro, Brazil	4th	Triple jump	16.81 m
2007	World Championships	Osaka, Japan	27th (q)	Triple jump	16.34 m
2008	Olympic Games	Beijing, China	28th (q)	Triple jump	16.45 m
2009	South American Championships	Lima, Peru	1st	Triple jump	16.38 m (w)
2009	Lusophony Games	Lisbon, Portugal	2nd	Triple jump	16.84 m
2009	World Championships	Berlin, Germany	28th (q)	Triple jump	16.34 m
2010	World Indoor Championships	Doha, Qatar	12th (q)	Triple jump	16.49 m
2010	Ibero-American Championships	San Fernando, Spain	4th	Triple jump	16.74 m
2011	South American Championships	Buenos Aires, Argentina	3rd	Triple jump	16.45 m
2011	Military World Games	Rio de Janeiro, Brazil	1st	Triple jump	16.89 m (wind: -0.6 m/s)
2011	World Championships	Daegu, South Korea	17th (q)	Triple jump	16.51 m
2011	Pan American Games	Guadalajara, Mexico	3rd	Triple jump	16.51 m
2012	World Indoor Championships	Istanbul, Turkey	10th (q)	Triple jump	16.67 m
2012	Ibero-American Championships	Barquisimeto, Venezuela	2nd	Triple jump	16.70 m (w)
2013	South American Championships	Cartagena, Colombia	1st	Triple jump	16.73 m
2013	World Championships	Moscow, Russia	16th (q)	Triple jump	16.49 m
2014	South American Games	Santiago, Chile	2nd	Triple jump	16.44 m
2015	South American Championships	Lima, Peru	2nd	Triple jump	16.34 m
2015	Pan American Games	Toronto, Canada	5th	Triple jump	16.43 m (w)
