= 2009 South American Championships in Athletics =

46th South American Championships
- Dates: 19 June – 21 June
- Host city: Lima, Peru
- Venue: Villa Deportiva Nacional
- Level: Senior
- Events: 44
- Records set: 10 Championship records 2 Area records

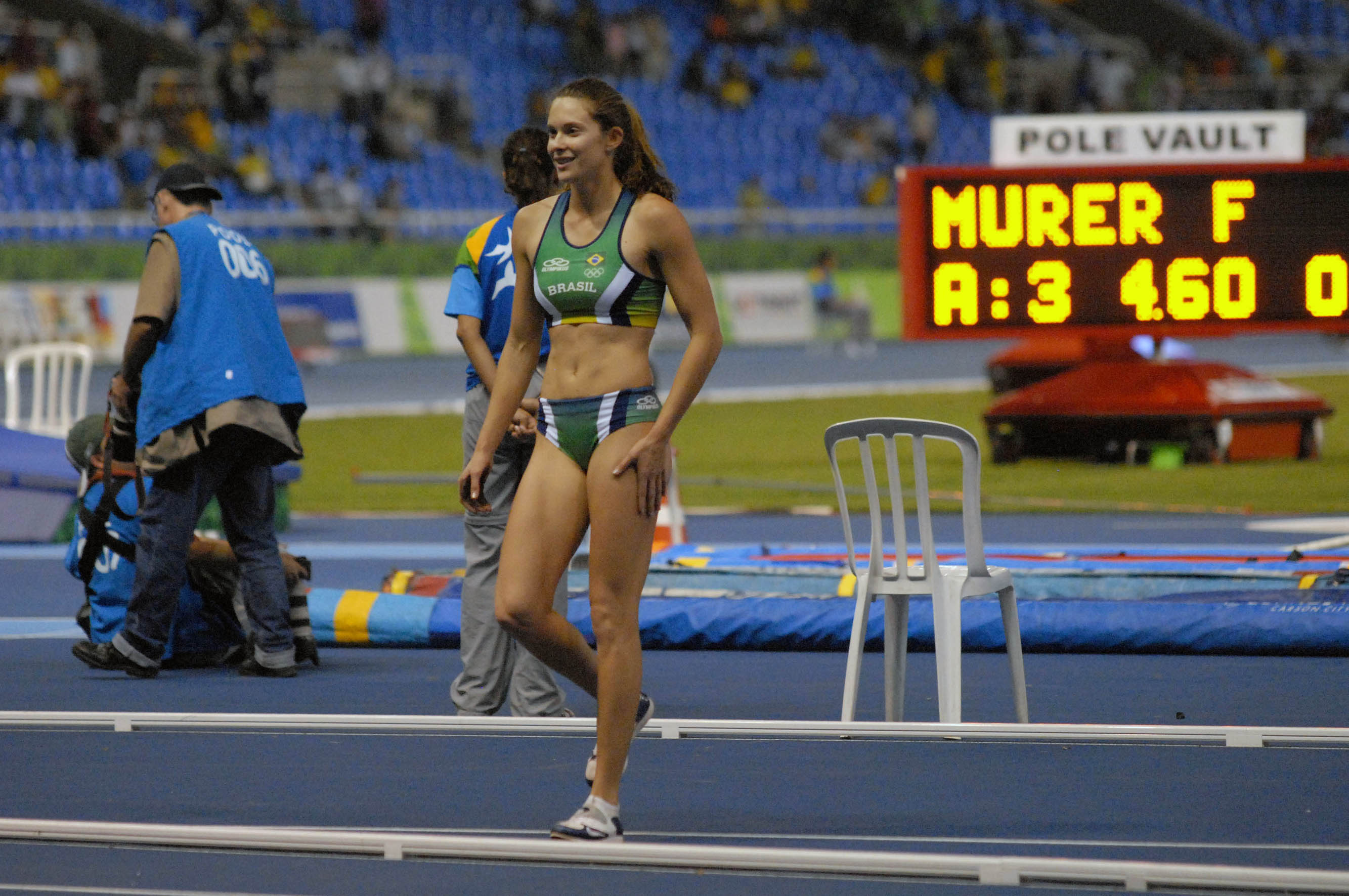
Fabiana Murer (above) set a new pole vault record.

The 2009 South American Championships in Athletics (Spanish: 2009 Campeonatos Sudamericanos) was the forty sixth edition of the tournament and was held between 19 and 21 June in Lima, Peru.

Brazil dominated the tournament, easily finishing with the highest total points and medals, and also winning the most gold, silver, and bronze medals. Colombia and Argentina took second and third places, respectively, while hosts Peru finished in fifth.

Numerous records were broken at the Championships, including two area records, 10 Championship records and seventeen national records. Both area records were achieved in the 20000 metres track walk event, with Luis Fernando López running 1:20:53.6 in the men's race to break Jefferson Pérez's previous mark, and Johana Ordóñez winning the women's race in 1:34:58. Mario Bazán also beat one of Pérez's records, setting a Championship record in the 3000 metres steeplechase.

Colombian Norma González was the athlete with the most medals at the end of the tournament, with three golds from the 200 metres, 400 metres, and 4×100 metres relay, and a silver from the 4×400 metres relay. A handful of other athletes also won multiple gold medals. Three women won two gold medals: Rosibel García won the 800 and 1500 metres, Germán Lauro took the shot put and discus titles, and Inés Melchor set a national and a Championship record in the 5000 and 10000 metres, respectively. Three male athletes also achieved double golds: Alonso Edward did the 100 and 200 metres sprint double, Andrés Silva won the 400 metres sprint and hurdles, while Byron Piedra won both the 1500 and 5000 metres races.

The competition was marred by drugs bans for medalling athletes: a Brazilian coach, Jayme Netto, admitted that he had administered the banned drug recombinant EPO on five of his athletes without their knowledge, which included: 800 m silver medallist Josiane Tito, 200 m bronze medallist Bruno de Barros, heptathlon champion Lucimara da Silva and 400 m hurdles silver medallist Luciana França. In a separate case, Lucimar Teodoro, the 400 m hurdles gold medallist, also received a two-year ban.

== Records ==
Name	Event	Country	Record	Type
Inés Melchor	5000 metres	Peru	16:00.41	NR
Fabiana Murer	Pole vault	Brazil	4.60	CR
Odette Palma	Hammer throw	Chile	64.55	NR
Mario Bazán	3000 metres steeplechase	Peru	8:35.17	CR NR
Eduardo Acuña	Hammer throw	Peru	67.26	NR
Arley Ibargüen	Javelin throw	Colombia	81.07	CR NR
Sabine Heitling	3000 metres steeplechase	Brazil	9:52.54	CR
Ángela Figueroa	3000 metres steeplechase	Colombia	9:54.83	NR
Elisângela Adriano	Discus throw	Brazil	61.00	CR
María Angélica Cubillán	Discus throw	Venezuela	54.07	NR
Lucimara da Silva	Heptathlon	Brazil	5996 (DQ)	CR
Macarena Reyes	Heptathlon	Chile	5360	NR
Johana Ordóñez	20000 metres track walk	Ecuador	1:34:58	AR CR
Sandra Zapata	20000 metres track walk	Colombia	1:35:53	NR
Luis Fernando López	20000 metres track walk	Colombia	1:20:53.6	AR CR
Yerko Araya	20000 metres track walk	Chile	1:23:08.2	NR
Inés Melchor	10,000 metres	Peru	33:11.79	CR
Lucimar Teodoro	400 metres hurdles	Brazil	56.32	CR
Key:WR — World record • AR — Area record • CR — Championship record • NR — National record

== Medal summary ==
=== Men's events ===
Event	Gold		Silver		Bronze	
100 metres	Alonso Edward; Panama	10.29	Daniel Grueso; Colombia	10.39	José Carlos Moreira; Brazil	10.49
200 metres	Alonso Edward; Panama	20.45	Hugo de Sousa; Brazil	20.92	Kael Becerra; Chile	21.32
400 metres	Andrés Silva; Uruguay	46.06	Geiner Mosquera; Colombia	46.28	Freddy Mezones; Venezuela	46.28
800 metres	Fabiano Peçanha; Brazil	1:47.82	Kléberson Davide; Brazil	1:49.33	Nico Herrera; Venezuela	1:49.53
1500 metres	Byron Piedra; Ecuador	3:41.81	Hudson de Souza; Brazil	3:42.72	Eduar Villanueva; Venezuela	3:43.23
5000 metres	Byron Piedra; Ecuador	13:56.93	Mario Bazán; Peru	13:57.37	Damião de Souza; Brazil	13:57.94
10,000 metres	Damião de Souza; Brazil	29:23.57	Miguel Ángel Bárzola; Argentina	29:23.62	Jhon Cusi; Peru	29:40.05
110 metres hurdles	Paulo Villar; Colombia	13.89	Éder Antônio Souza; Brazil	13.97	Anselmo Gomes da Silva; Brazil	14.12
400 metres hurdles	Andrés Silva; Uruguay	50.28	Raphael Fernandes; Brazil	50.42	Yeison Rivas; Colombia	50.87
3000 metres steeplechase	Mario Bazán; Peru	8:35.17 CR NR	José Peña; Venezuela	8:36.17 PB	Mariano Mastromarino; Argentina	8:51.48
4 x 100 metres relay	Colombia; Yeison Rivas; Jhon Valoyes; Yeimer Mosquera; Daniel Grueso	39.41	Venezuela; Lenin Cubillán; Jermaine Chirinos; Álvaro Cassiani; Ronald Amaya	40.26	Argentina; Matías Usandivaras; Fabian Jiménez; Miguel Wilken; José Manuel Garaventa	40.76
4 x 400 metres relay	Colombia; Yeison Rivas; Jhon Valoyes; Amílcar Torres; Yeimer Mosquera	3:06.22	Brazil; Luis Eduardo Ambrósio; Eduardo Vasconcelos; Rodrigo Bargas; Wallace Vieira	3:06.85	Argentina; Matías Larregle; Miguel Wilken; Christian Deymonnaz; Mariano Jiménez	3:11.70
20,000 metres track walk	Luis Fernando López; Colombia	1:20:53.6 CR, AR	Yerko Araya; Chile	1:23:08.2 NR	Patricio Ortega; Ecuador	1:23:30.9 PB
High jump	Jessé de Lima; Brazil	2.216	Alberth Bravo; Venezuela	2.13	Diego Ferrín; Ecuador	2.10
Pole vault	Fábio Gomes da Silva; Brazil	5.40	Marcelo Terra; Argentina	4.80	César González; Venezuela	4.80
Long jump	Rogério Bispo; Brazil	7.77	Erivaldo Vieira; Brazil	7.61	Hugo Chila; Ecuador	7.51
Triple jump	Jefferson Sabino; Brazil	16.38w	Hugo Chila; Ecuador	16.12	Maximiliano Díaz; Argentina	15.49
Shot put	Germán Lauro; Argentina	19.20	Ronald Julião; Brazil	18.19	Gustavo de Mendonça; Brazil	17.55
Discus	Germán Lauro; Argentina	60.41	Jorge Balliengo; Argentina	58.04	Ronald Julião; Brazil	54.97
Hammer	Juan Cerra; Argentina	69.42	Patricio Palma; Chile	68.53	Eduardo Acuña; Peru	67.26 NR
Javelin	Arley Ibargüen; Colombia	81.07 CR, NR	Noraldo Palacios; Colombia	77.87	Júlio César de Oliveira; Brazil	73.51
Decathlon	Carlos Chinin; Brazil	7474	Oscar Mina; Ecuador	6659	Fernando Korniejczuk; Argentina	6505
WR world record | AR area record | CR championship record | GR games record | NR national record | OR Olympic record | PB personal best | SB season best | WL world leading (in a given season)

=== Women's events ===
Event	Gold		Silver		Bronze	
100 metres	Lucimar de Moura; Brazil	11.59	Felipa Palacios; Colombia	11.79	Thaíssa Presti; Brazil	11.85
200 metres	Norma González; Colombia	23.73	Thaíssa Presti; Brazil	23.85	Jennifer Padilla; Colombia	24.23
400 metres	Norma González; Colombia	52.62	Emily Pinheiro; Brazil	52.73	Jailma de Lima; Brazil	52.95
800 metres	Rosibel García; Colombia	2:05.21	Christiane dos Santos; Brazil	2:06.72	Muriel Coneo; Colombia	2:07.32
1500 metres	Rosibel García; Colombia	4:20.30	Muriel Coneo; Colombia	4:23.38	Rosa Godoy; Argentina	4:23.63
5000 metres	Inés Melchor; Peru	16:00.41 NR	Sueli Silva; Brazil	16:14.95	Rosa Alba Chacha; Ecuador	16:17.75
10,000 metres	Inés Melchor; Peru	33:11.79 CR	Cruz Nonata da Silva; Brazil	33:36.60	Sueli Silva; Brazil	33:47.15
100 metres hurdles	Brigitte Merlano; Colombia	13.22	Soledad Donzino; Argentina	13.48	Fabiana Morães; Brazil	13.56
400 metres hurdles	Madelene Rondón; Venezuela	58.29	Lucy Jaramillo; Ecuador	58.45	Princesa Oliveros; Colombia	58.67
3000 metres steeplechase	Sabine Heitling; Brazil	9:52.54 CR	Ángela Figueroa; Colombia	9:54.83 NR	Rosa Godoy; Argentina	10:12.95
20000 metre track walk	Johana Ordóñez; Ecuador	1:34:58 CR, AR	Sandra Zapata; Colombia	1:35:53 NR	Tânia Spindler; Brazil	1:36:32 PB
4 x 100 metres relay	Colombia; Felipa Palácios; María Alejandra Idrobo; Darlenys Obregón; Norma González	44.18	Brazil; Rosemar Coelho Neto; Lucimar de Moura; Thaíssa Presti; Jailma de Lima	44.52	Ecuador; Lorena Mina; Karina Caicedo; Liliana Núñez; Erika Chávez	47.20
4 x 400 metres relay	Brazil; Geisa Coutinho; Sheila Ferreira; Jailma de Lima; Emmily Pinheiro	3:32.69	Colombia; Kelly López; María Alejandra Idrobo; Jennifer Padilla; Norma González	3:35.83	Ecuador; Karina Caicedo; Erika Chávez; Maria Corozo; Lucy Jaramillo	3:45.99
High jump	Caterine Ibargüen; Colombia	1.88	Solange Witteveen; Argentina	1.85	Mônica de Freitas; Brazil	1.82
Pole vault	Fabiana Murer; Brazil	4.60 CR	Carolina Torres; Chile	4.10	Alejandra García; Argentina	4.10
Long jump	Keila Costa; Brazil	6.62	Andrea Morales; Argentina	5.78	Verónica Davis; Venezuela	5.60
Triple jump	Caterine Ibargüen; Colombia	13.93	Verónica Davis; Venezuela	13.83	Tânia da Silva; Brazil	13.38
Shot put	Natalia Ducó; Chile	17.73	Elisângela Adriano; Brazil	16.63	Andréa Pereira; Brazil	16.16
Discus	Elisângela Adriano; Brazil	61.00 CR	Karen Gallardo; Chile	55.91	María Angélica Cubillán; Venezuela	54.07 NR
Hammer	Johana Moreno; Colombia	65.79	Odette Palma; Chile	64.55	Jennifer Dahlgren; Argentina	63.81
Javelin	Alessandra Resende; Brazil	56.36	Jucilene de Lima; Brazil	54.37	Diana Rivas; Colombia	52.83
Heptathlon	Vanessa Chefer Spinola; Brazil	5578	Macarena Reyes; Chile	5360NR	Soledad Donzino; Argentina	5200
WR world record | AR area record | CR championship record | GR games record | NR national record | OR Olympic record | PB personal best | SB season best | WL world leading (in a given season)

== Final standings ==
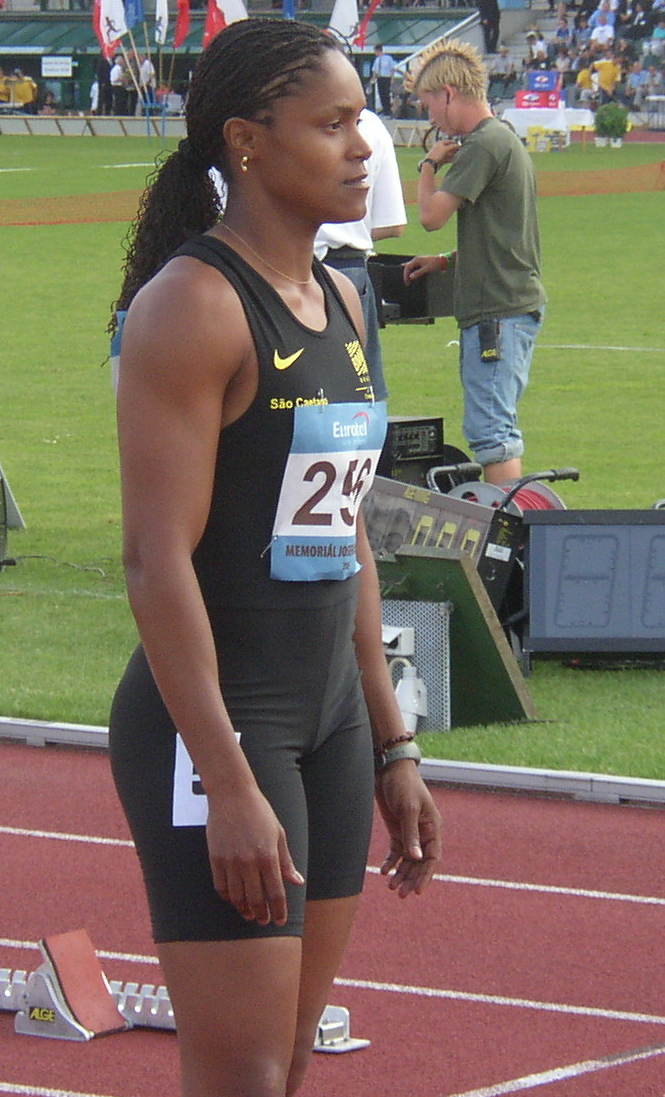
Lucimar de Moura won gold for Brazil in the women's 100 m.

=== Points table ===
Rank	Country	Points		
Rank	Country	Total	Men	Women
1	Brazil	446	204	242
2	Colombia	275	98	177
3	Argentina	138.5	88.5	50
4	Ecuador	111	64	47
5	Peru	91	51	40
6	Chile	87	42	45
7	Venezuela	73.5	49.5	24
8	Panama	25	20	5

=== Medal table ===
* Host nation (Peru)

Rank	Nation	Gold	Silver	Bronze	Total
1	Brazil	15	16	14	45
2	Colombia	14	8	5	27
3	Argentina	3	6	10	19
4	Ecuador	3	3	6	12
5	Peru*	3	1	2	6
6	Panama	2	0	0	2
6	Uruguay	2	0	0	2
8	Chile	1	6	1	8
9	Venezuela	1	4	5	10
Totals (9 entries)		44	44	43	131

== See also ==
- 2009 in athletics (track and field)
- 2009 World Championships in Athletics
