= José David Flores =

Puerto Rican baseball coach (born 1971)

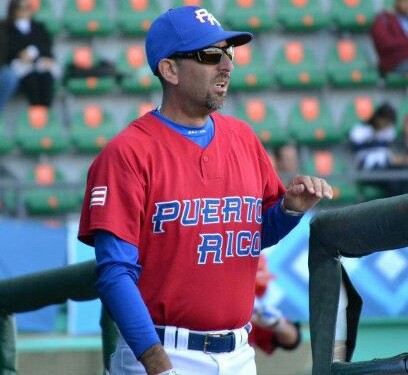
- Flores with Puerto Rico

Boston Red Sox – No. 58
- Coach
- Born: January 1, 1971 (age 55); Cidra, Puerto Rico
- Bats: Switch Throws: Right
- Stats at Baseball Reference

Teams
- Chicago Cubs (2012–2017); Philadelphia Phillies (2018); Baltimore Orioles (2019–2020); Boston Red Sox (2025–present)

José David Flores (born January 1, 1971) is a Puerto Rican professional baseball coach and former player. He currently serves as the interim bench coach for the Boston Red Sox of Major League Baseball (MLB). He has previously coached in MLB for the Chicago Cubs, Philadelphia Phillies, and Baltimore Orioles. He was a player in Minor League Baseball from 1990 to 1994.

== Minor league playing career ==
The Houston Astros selected Flores in the 38th round (1,014th overall) of the 1990 Major League Baseball draft. Beginning with the 1990 season, he was assigned to the Class A Short Season Auburn Astros of the New York–Penn League. In all, Flores played five years in Minor League Baseball (MiLB), all in the Astros' farm system, from 1990 to 1994.

In 1992 and 1993, Flores made 37 errors at shortstop, each year. In 1994, he spent his final season as an active player with the Double-A Jackson Generals of the Texas League, batting just .192.

In 1,340 minor league at bats, Flores had a .239/.310/.287 slash line, with five home runs, 36 stolen bases, and 115 runs batted in (RBIs). A utility infielder, he played 314 games at shortstop, 63 games at second base, and 26 games at third base. In Flores’ final season, he appeared in two games as a relief pitcher.

== Coaching and managing career ==
After retiring as a player, Flores has served as a manager, bench coach, third base coach, first base coach, and infield coach in the Puerto Rican Winter League (LBPRC). He managed the Puerto Rican national baseball team during the Guadalajara 2011 PanAm Games and the 2011 Baseball World Cup. He managed the Cidra Bravos of the FBAPR (PR Baseball Federation), winning back to back national titles during the 2005 and 2006 seasons, and was named manager of the year for 2005. He won his third national title with the club in 2009.

Flores managed the 2008 Dominican Summer League Indians, and for five seasons, he worked for the Chicago Cubs as their infield coordinator.

The Philadelphia Phillies hired Flores to their major league coaching staff for the 2018 season. He was named first base coach and infield coach, and was also in charge of baserunning.

In 2019 and 2020, Flores was the Baltimore Orioles third base coach and infield coach. After he was engaged in a dugout shouting match about defensive positioning by ground-ball relief pitcher Richard Bleier, Bleier finally played in front of an infield that was not shifted for the final month of the 2019 season, and saw his results improve. In both 2019 and 2020, the team was the American League’s worst defensive infield by the Statcast metric outs above average. After the 2020 season his contract was not renewed.

In December 2021, Flores was named the bench coach of the Worcester Red Sox, the Triple-A affiliate of the Boston Red Sox.

On November 22, 2024, Flores was named first base coach of the major-league Red Sox. On April 27, 2026, following the dismissal of manager Alex Cora and several coaches, Flores was named interim bench coach.

Sporting positions
Preceded by Ramón Vázquez	Boston Red Sox bench coach April 2026 – present (Interim)	Succeeded by Incumbent
Preceded by Andy Fox	Boston Red Sox first base coach 2025 – April 2026	Succeeded by Pablo Cabrera
