= 1998 South American Youth Championships in Athletics =

XIV South American Youth Championships in Athletics
- Dates: October 23–25
- Host city: Manaus, Brazil
- Level: Youth
- Events: 41
- Participation: about 190 athletes from 13 nations

The 14th South American Youth Championships in Athletics were held in Manaus, Brazil from October 23–25, 1998.

== Medal summary ==
Medal winners are published for boys and girls. Complete results can be found on the "World Junior Athletics History" website.

=== Men ===
Event	Gold		Silver		Bronze	
100 metres (wind: -1.9 m/s)	Basílio de Moraes (BRA)	10.6	Roberto de Jesus (BRA)	10.8	David Olson (VEN)	10.8
200 metres (wind: 0.0 m/s)	Jagnner Palacios (COL)	21.70	Basílio de Moraes (BRA)	21.72	Julio de Moura (BRA)	22.31
400 metres	Denis de Santana (BRA)	49.57	Luiz da Silveira (BRA)	49.78	Enderson Gordillo (VEN)	50.34
800 metres	Simoncito Silvera (VEN)	1:58.54	Fabiano Peçanha (BRA)	1:58.69	Sebastián Pino (CHI)	1:59.58
1500 metres	Santiago Beisso (URU)	4:05.10	José Manuel González (VEN)	4:05.43	Vinicius Lopes (BRA)	4:05.53
5000 metres	José Correa (ARG)	15:11.76	Juarez de Souza (BRA)	15:14.74	Milton Ayala (COL)	15:22.24
1500 metres steeplechase	José Correa (ARG)	4:22.77	Sebastián Pino (CHI)	4:24.75	José Manuel González (VEN)	4:26.60
110 metres hurdles (wind: 0.0 m/s)	Marleán Reyna (VEN)	14.30	Gabriel Paredes (ARG)	14.60	Thiago Dias (BRA)	14.76
300 metres hurdles	Diego Morán (ARG)	38.66	Marcius de Almeida (BRA)	38.81	Felipe da Silva (BRA)	39.08
High jump	Andrés Mantilla (COL)	2.01	Andrés Molano (VEN)	1.98	Galileo Yomha (ARG)	1.95
Pole vault	Jorge Naranjo (CHI)	4.40	José Francisco Nava (CHI)	4.20	Gabriel Paredes (ARG)	3.90
Long jump	Vítor Rodrigues (BRA)	6.85	Thiago Dias (BRA)	6.75	Jagnner Palacios (COL)	6.55
Triple jump	Elton de Oliveira (BRA)	13.89	Jefferson Sabino (BRA)	13.71	Víctor Rodríguez (PER)	13.66
Shot put	Rafael do Nascimento (BRA)	16.90	Clayton Santos (BRA)	15.54	Héctor Hurtado (VEN)	15.38
Discus throw	Paolo Mangili (CHI)	47.60	Héctor Hurtado (VEN)	47.16	José Felice (ARG)	46.62
Hammer throw	Fabián Di Paolo (ARG)	61.77	Lucas Andino (ARG)	60.24	Roberto Sáez (CHI)	55.69
Javelin throw	Alexon Maximiano (BRA)	57.39	José Palma (VEN)	53.96	Milton Quejada (COL)	53.71
Hexathlon	Ivan da Silva (BRA)	3915	André Salvino (BRA)	3382	Andrés Dueñas (PER)	3347
5000 metres track walk	Fernando Sánchez (COL)	23:07.69	Juan Pablo Mesquita (URU)	23:09.16	Claudio de Oliveira (BRA)	25:33.67
4 × 100 metres relay	Colombia; Jackson Moreno; Héctor Díaz; Jacner Palacios; José Palacios	42.70	Chile; Felipe Subercaseaux; Diego Valdés; Cristian Miranda; Sebastián Martínez	43.09	Brazil; Roberto de Jesús; Vítor Rodrigues; Thiago Dias; Julio de Moura	43.22
4 × 400 metres relay	Colombia; Jackson Moreno; Jacner Palacios; Héctor Díaz; Deivi Moreno	3:22.36	Brazil; Fabiano Peçanha; Denis de Santana; Luiz da Silveira; Marcius de Almeida	3:23.23	Venezuela; Enderson Gordillo; Simoncito Silvera; Héctor Borges; José Acacio	3:23.96

=== Women ===
Event	Gold		Silver		Bronze	
100 metres (wind: +0.7 m/s)	Thatiana Ignácio (BRA)	12.04	Wilmary Álvarez (VEN)	12.43	Fabiola Hecht (CHI)	12.54
200 metres (wind: +0.7 m/s)	Norma González (COL)	24.35	Thatiana Ignácio (BRA)	25.00	Fabiola Hecht (CHI)	25.13
400 metres	Norma González (COL)	55.40	Perla dos Santos (BRA)	57.35	Danielle Barbosa (BRA)	58.21
800 metres	Juliana de Azevedo (BRA)	2:13.60	Vanesa Maraviglia (ARG)	2:14.88	Yusmelys García (VEN)	2:17.41
1500 metres	Tatiane Sá (BRA)	4:38.92	Vanesa Maraviglia (ARG)	4:39.41	Jorgelina Litterini (ARG)	4:39.42
3000 metres	Tatiane Sá (BRA)	10:09.54	Joana do Nascimento (BRA)	10:22.65	Ketty Valencia (PER)	10:24.08
100 metres hurdles (wind: 0.0 m/s)	Annette Stotz (CHI)	14.58	Patricia Riesco (PER)	14.65	Gerlane Gomes (BRA)	14.94
300 metres hurdles	Gerlane Gomes (BRA)	44.64	Magdalena Sánchez (CHI)	45.01	Yusneidy Pérez (VEN)	48.23
High jump	Ivonne Patarroyo (COL)	1.67	Kerstin Weiss (CHI)	1.64	Daniela Carrillo (CHI)	1.64
Pole vault	Rosângela da Silva (BRA)	3.30	Francine Rosselot (CHI)	2.90	Alejandra García (COL)	2.90
Long jump	Renata Peixoto (BRA)	5.75	Fernanda Gonçalves (BRA)	5.64	Jennifer Arveláez (VEN)	5.60
Triple jump	Jennifer Arveláez (VEN)	12.21	Fernanda Gonçalves (BRA)	12.02	Daniele de Moraes (BRA)	11.31
Shot put	Viviana Mussi (ARG)	11.77	Josefina D'Hiriart (ARG)	11.65	Arelis Quiñones (COL)	11.58
Discus throw	Luana dos Santos (BRA)	36.86	María Mercedes Melogno (URU)	36.06	Yariela Castañeda (COL)	35.84
Hammer throw	Joana Gualpa (ECU)	51.38*	Alessandra Peixoto (BRA)	51.24*	Odette Palma (CHI)	49.50*
Javelin throw	Leryn Franco (PAR)	40.26	Luana dos Santos (BRA)	38.04	Isabel Widmer (CHI)	37.06
Pentathlon	Valeria Steffens (CHI)	3573	Katiusca Venâncio (BRA)	3294	Daniele de Moraes (BRA)	3110
3000 metres Track Walk	Luisa Paltín (ECU)	14:04.99	Mónica Carrión (ECU)	14:18.38	Lizbeth Zúñiga (PER)	15:21.37
4 × 100 metres relay	Brazil; Gerlane da Silva; Thatiana Ignâcio; Rayca Sussuarana; Fernanda Gonçalves	47.89	Chile; María José Echeverría; Fabiola Hecht; Magdalena Sánchez; Pilar Fuenzalida	48.48	Colombia; Miladys Ramírez; Sandra Mosquera; Norma González; Ivonne Patarroyo	48.87
4 × 400 metres relay	Chile; María José Echeverría; Fabiola Hecht; Magdalena Sánchez; Valeria Steffens	3:54.20	Brazil; Cláudia Pereira; Perla dos Santos; Fernanda Gonçalves; Pricila Dutra	3:54.25	Colombia; Miladys Ramírez; Alejandra García; Norma González; Diana Bueno	3:56.12

== Medal table (unofficial) ==
* Host nation (Brazil)

Rank	Nation	Gold	Silver	Bronze	Total
1	Brazil*	16	20	10	46
2	Colombia	8	0	8	16
3	Chile	5	7	7	19
4	Argentina	5	5	4	14
5	Venezuela	3	5	8	16
6	Ecuador	2	1	0	3
7	Uruguay	1	2	0	3
8	Paraguay	1	0	0	1
9	Peru	0	1	4	5
Totals (9 entries)		41	41	41	123

== Participation (unofficial) ==
Detailed result lists can be found on the "World Junior Athletics History" website. An unofficial count yields the number of about 190 athletes from about 13 countries:

- Argentina (17)
- Bolivia (5)
- Brazil (54)
- Chile (33)
- Colombia (22)
- Ecuador (7)
- Guyana (4)
- Panama (2)
- Paraguay (6)
- Peru (12)
- Suriname (1)
- Uruguay (7)
- Venezuela (20)
