= Basílio de Moraes =

Brazilian sprinter (born 1982)

Basílio de Moraes Jr.
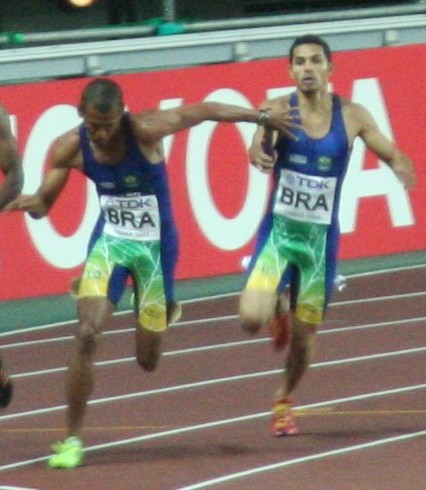
- Basílio de Moraes (right) at the 2007 World Championships

Personal information
- Full name: Basílio Emídio de Moraes (Morais) Júnior
- Nationality: Brazil
- Born: 11 May 1982 (age 44) João Pessoa, Paraíba, Brazil
- Height: 1.78 m (5 ft 10 in)
- Weight: 75 kg (165 lb)

Sport
- Sport: Athletics
Medal record
Men's Athletics
Representing Brazil
Pan American Games
| Gold medal – first place | 2007 Rio de Janeiro | 4x100m relay |
South American Youth Championships
| Gold medal – first place | 1998 Manaus | 100 m |
| Silver medal – second place | 1998 Manaus | 200 m |
- Updated on 12 May 2013

Basílio Emídio de Moraes Júnior (born 11 May 1982, in João Pessoa, Paraíba) is a Brazilian sprinter who competed in the 2004 Summer Olympics.

== Achievements ==
| Year | Competition | Venue | Position | Event | Notes |
Representing Brazil
| 1998 | South American Youth Championships | Manaus, Brazil | 1st | 100 m | 10.6 s (wind: -1.9 m/s) |
| 1998 | South American Youth Championships | Manaus, Brazil | 2nd | 200 m | 21.72 s (wind: 0.0 m/s) |
| 2004 | South American U23 Championships | Barquisimeto, Venezuela | 2nd | 200m | 21.06 (wind: +0.0 m/s) |
| 2004 | South American U23 Championships | Barquisimeto, Venezuela | 1st | 4 × 100 m relay | 39.42 |
