= Thatiana Regina Ignácio =

Brazilian sprinter (born 1983)

Personal information
- Born: 2 July 1983 (age 42) São Vicente, São Paulo, Brazil

Sport
- Sport: Track and field
Medal record
Representing Brazil
Summer Universiade
Bronze medal – third place	2003 Daegu	4x100m relay

Thatiana Regina Ignácio (born 2 July 1983) is a retired Brazilian athlete who specialised in the sprinting events. She competed with her teammates in the 4 × 100 metres relay at the 2005 and 2007 World Championships finishing fifth on the first occasion. She won multiple medals at the regional level.

She has personal bests of 11.45 seconds in the 100 metres (2007) and 23.92 seconds in the 200 metres (2005).

== Competition record ==
Year	Competition	Venue	Position	Event	Notes
Representing Brazil
1998	World Youth Games	Moscow, Russia	2nd	100 m	12.05
1998	World Youth Games	Moscow, Russia	7th	4 × 100 m relay	49.33
1998	South American Youth Championships	Manaus, Brazil	1st	100 m	12.04
1998	South American Youth Championships	Manaus, Brazil	2nd	200 m relay	25.00
1998	South American Youth Championships	Manaus, Brazil	1st	4 × 100 m relay	47.89
1999	World Youth Championships	Bydgoszcz, Poland	10th (sf)	100 m	11.94
1999	World Youth Championships	Bydgoszcz, Poland	52nd (h)	200 m	26.44
1999	World Youth Championships	Bydgoszcz, Poland	5th	Medley relay	2:12.13
1999	South American Junior Championships	Concepción, Chile	2nd	100 m	11.73
1999	South American Junior Championships	Concepción, Chile	2nd	4 × 100 m relay	46.63
2000	South American Junior Championships	São Leopoldo, Brazil	1st	100 m	11.89
2000	South American Junior Championships	São Leopoldo, Brazil	3rd	4 × 100 m relay	47.39
2000	World Junior Championships	Santiago, Chile	8th	100 m	11.84 (wind: +2.0 m/s)
2000	South American Youth Championships	Bogotá, Colombia	1st	100 m	11.55 (A)
2000	South American Youth Championships	Bogotá, Colombia	2nd	4 × 100 m relay	46.15 (A)
2000	South American Youth Championships	Bogotá, Colombia	1st	4 × 400 m relay	2:12.21 (A)
2001	South American Championships	Manaus, Brazil	1st	4 × 100 m relay	44.32
2001	South American Junior Championships	Santa Fe, Argentina	1st	100 m	11.64
2001	South American Junior Championships	Santa Fe, Argentina	1st	4 × 100 m relay	45.09
2001	Pan American Junior Championships	Santa Fe, Argentina	1st	100 m	11.54
2001	Pan American Junior Championships	Santa Fe, Argentina	1st	4 × 100 m relay	45.36
2002	Ibero-American Championships	Guatemala City, Guatemala	2nd	100 m	11.49
2002	Ibero-American Championships	Guatemala City, Guatemala	1st	4 × 100 m relay	44.28
2002	World Junior Championships	Kingston, Jamaica	5th	100 m	11.79 (wind: -0.2 m/s)
2002	South American Junior Championships / South American Games	Belém, Brazil	1st	100 m	11.57 (wind: +1.3 m/s)
2002	South American Junior Championships / South American Games	Belém, Brazil	1st	4 × 100 m relay	45.30
2003	South American Championships	Barquisimeto, Venezuela	1st	4 × 100 m relay	44.16
2003	Universiade	Daegu, South Korea	3rd	4 × 100 m relay	45.79
2004	South American U23 Championships	Barquisimeto, Venezuela	1st	100 m	11.63 (wind: +0.0 m/s)
2004	South American U23 Championships	Barquisimeto, Venezuela	1st	4 × 100 m relay	45.36
2005	South American Championships	Cali, Colombia	2nd	4 × 100 m relay	44.35
2005	World Championships	Helsinki, Finland	5th	4 × 100 m relay	42.99
2007	South American Championships	São Paulo, Brazil	1st	4 × 100 m relay	43.54
2007	Pan American Games	Rio de Janeiro, Brazil	6th	4 × 100 m relay	44.14
2007	World Championships	Osaka, Japan	15th (h)	4 × 100 m relay	44.64
