= Tânia da Silva =

Brazilian triple jumper (born 1986)

Tânia Ferreira da Silva (born 17 December 1986) is a Brazilian athlete who specialises in the triple jump. She represented her country at the 2007 World Championships failing to qualify for the final.

== Competition record ==
Year	Competition	Venue	Position	Event	Notes
Representing Brazil
2002	South American Youth Championships	Asunción, Paraguay	6th	100 m	12.65 s
2002	South American Youth Championships	Asunción, Paraguay	1st	4x100 m relay	47.3 s
2002	South American Youth Championships	Asunción, Paraguay	2nd	Medley relay	2:14.55 min
2003	South American Junior Championships	Guayaquil, Ecuador	4th	Long jump	5.55 m
2004	South American U23 Championships	Barquisimeto, Venezuela	3rd	Long jump	6.05 m (wind: -0.7 m/s)
2004	South American U23 Championships	Barquisimeto, Venezuela	3rd	Triple jump	12.78 m (wind: +2.2 m/s) w
2004	World Junior Championships	Grosseto, Italy	16th (q)	Triple jump	12.84 m
2005	Pan American Championships	Windsor, Canada	4th	Long jump	6.04 m
2005	Pan American Championships	Windsor, Canada	2nd	Triple jump	13.38 m (w)
2005	South American Junior Championships	Rosario, Argentina	2nd	Long jump	6.14 m
2005	South American Junior Championships	Rosario, Argentina	1st	Triple jump	13.31 m (w)
2006	South American Championships	Tunja, Colombia	1st	Triple jump	13.92 m
2006	Lusophony Games	Macau, China	1st	Long jump	5.96 m
2006	Lusophony Games	Macau, China	1st	Triple jump	13.42 m
2006	South American U23 Championships / South American Games	Buenos Aires, Argentina	2nd	Long jump	6.05 m (wind: -1.2 m/s)
2006	South American U23 Championships / South American Games	Buenos Aires, Argentina	1st	Triple jump	13.35 m (wind: +1.8 m/s)
2007	World Championships	Osaka, Japan	20th (q)	Triple jump	13.81 m
2008	World Indoor Championships	Valencia, Spain	18th (q)	Triple jump	13.03 m
2009	South American Championships	Lima, Peru	3rd	Triple jump	13.38 m
2009	Lusophony Games	Lisbon, Portugal	3rd	Triple jump	13.23 m
2010	Ibero-American Championships	San Fernando, Spain	5th	Triple jump	13.30 m
2012	Ibero-American Championships	Barquisimeto, Venezuela	4th	Triple jump	13.08 m
2014	Ibero-American Championships	São Paulo, Brazil	3rd	Triple jump	13.47 m
2015	South American Championships	Lima, Peru	2nd	Long jump	6.37 m (w)
2015	South American Championships	Lima, Peru	2nd	Triple jump	13.60 m
2015	World Championships	Beijing, China	28th (q)	Long jump	6.18 m
2016	Ibero-American Championships	Rio de Janeiro, Brazil	5th	Triple jump	13.31 m
2017	IAAF World Relays	Nassau, Bahamas	8th (h)	4x100 m relay	44.20^{1}
2017	World Championships	London, United Kingdom	21st (q)	Triple jump	13.74 m

^{1}Did not finish in the final

== Personal bests ==
Outdoor

- Long jump – 6.47 (-0.3 m/s) (São Paulo 2010)
- Triple jump – 14.11 (+1.8 m/s) (Uberlândia 2007)

Indoor

- Triple jump – 13.70 (Valladolid 2008)
