= Evelyn dos Santos =

Brazilian sprinter

Personal information
- Full name: Evelyn Carolina de Oliveira dos Santos
- Nationality: Brazil
- Born: 11 April 1985 (age 41) Rio de Janeiro, Brazil
- Height: 1.72 m (5 ft 8 in)
- Weight: 59 kg (130 lb)

Sport
- Country: Brazil
- Sport: Athletics
- Event(s): 100 m, 200 m and 4×100 m
- College team: Universidade Castelo Branco
- Team: Unique Track and Field
- Turned pro: 2000 (Clube de Regatas do Flamengo)
- Coached by: Gustavo dos Santos

Achievements and titles
- Olympic finals: Beijing 2008 and London 2012
- World finals: IAAF World Championship 2013 (Moscow), IAAf World Relays 2014, IAAF World Relays 2015
- Personal best: 11s35, 22s82, 42s29
Medal record
Women's Athletics
Representing Brazil
South American Youth Championships
| Gold medal – first place | 2000 Bogotá | Medley relay |
| Gold medal – first place | 2002 Asunción | 200 m |
| Gold medal – first place | 2002 Asunción | 4x100 m relay |
| Silver medal – second place | 2000 Bogotá | 4x100 m relay |
| Silver medal – second place | 2002 Asunción | 4x400 m relay |
- Updated on 14 May 2013

Evelyn Carolina de Oliveira dos Santos (born 11 April 1985 in Rio de Janeiro) is a Brazilian track and field athlete who competes in sprinting events.

== Career ==
At the 2012 Summer Olympics, she competed in the Women's 200 metres. She has a personal best of 11.16 in the 100 metres, and a personal best of 22.76 in the 200 metres.

Also at London, the Brazilian women's 4 × 100 m relay team, composed of Ana Cláudia Lemos, Franciela Krasucki, Evelyn dos Santos and Rosângela Santos, broke the South American record in qualifying for the final, with a time of 42.55, and went to the final in sixth place. In the final, the Brazilian team ran 42.91 and finished seventh.

At the 2013 World Championships in Moscow, this same team again broke the South American record, in the semifinals of the women's 4 × 100 m relay, with a time of 42.29 seconds. In the final, Brazil was tied with Jamaica in second place and poised to take silver and break the South American record when, at the last baton exchange, Vanda, who was running in the Rosangela's place, let the baton fall.

== Achievements ==
| Year | Competition | Venue | Position | Event | Notes |
Representing Brazil
| 2000 | South American Youth Championships | Bogotá, Colombia | 5th | 200 m | 25.49 s (wind: -3.3 m/s) A |
| 2000 | South American Youth Championships | Bogotá, Colombia | 2nd | 4 × 100 m relay | 46.15 s A |
| 2000 | South American Youth Championships | Bogotá, Colombia | 1st | 4 × 400 m relay | 2:12.21 min A |
| 2002 | South American Junior Championships / South American Games | Belém, Brazil | 3rd | 100m | 11.90 (wind: +1.3 m/s) |
| 2002 | South American Junior Championships / South American Games | Belém, Brazil | 3rd | 200m | 24.23 (wind: +1.7 m/s) |
| 2002 | South American Junior Championships / South American Games | Belém, Brazil | 1st | 4 × 100 m relay | 45.30 |
| 2002 | South American Youth Championships | Asunción, Paraguay | 1st | 100 m | 12.19 s (wind: -0.7 m/s) |
| 2002 | South American Youth Championships | Asunción, Paraguay | 1st | 200 m | 24.18 s (wind: +3.3 m/s) w |
| 2002 | South American Youth Championships | Asunción, Paraguay | 1st | 4 × 100 m relay | 47.3 s |
| 2002 | South American Youth Championships | Asunción, Paraguay | 2nd | 4 × 400 m relay | 2:14.55 min |
