= Pablo Cabrera =

American baseball coach (born 1997)

Boston Red Sox – No. 83
- Coach
- Born: June 25, 1997 (age 29)
- Bats: Right Throws: Right

Teams
- Boston Red Sox (2026)

Pablo Juan Cabrera (born June 25, 1997) is an American professional baseball coach who is currently in the Boston Red Sox organization.

Cabrera has worked in the Red Sox organization in various roles since 2023, and was named the acting first base coach and outfield coordinator for the 2026 season after a 10–17 start to the season.

== Career ==
Cabrera played high school baseball at Bishop Moore Catholic High School, graduating in 2015. Cabrera then started playing college baseball at Florida Southern College, where he majored in business administration and graduated in 2019.

After graduating, Cabrera worked a sales job, but had a part-time job as a hitting coach at West Orange High School. After realizing he wanted to go into coaching, Cabrera enrolled at University of Charleston, where he coached the baseball team while earning a master of strategic leadership. He served as the team's defensive coordinator in 2021, and then became their offensive coordinator in 2022.

During the summer of 2021, Cabrera was the hitting coach for the Anchorage Glacier Pilots of the Alaska Baseball League, helping them to a league championship.

After graduating in 2022, Cabrera joined the Boston Red Sox organization, initially as a first base coach for the team's Double-A affiliate, the Portland Sea Dogs. The following season, Cabrera worked as the defensive coach for the Florida Complex League Red Sox. At the time of his promotion to the Major League team, Cabrera was working across the entire Red Sox organization as a roving instructor.

On April 25, 2026, after a 10–17 start to the 2026 season, the Red Sox overhauled their coaching staff, most notably firing their longtime manager, Alex Cora. As a result of these changes, José David Flores, who was the Red Sox first base coach at the time, was moved to interim bench coach, leaving the position open. On April 26, Cabrera was promoted to interim first base coach and outfield instructor for the Red Sox. Cabrera coached his first game on April 27, against the Toronto Blue Jays. Cabrera would stay with the team for the remainder of the season, as they made the playoffs before falling in two games in the AL Wild Card Series to the New York Yankees.

On October 21, 2026, the Red Sox announced that Cabrera would return to his previous role as minor league defensive coordinator for the organization.

Preceded by José David Flores	Boston Red Sox first-base coach 2026 (Interim)	Succeeded by Vacant
