= Emmily Pinheiro =

Brazilian sprinter (born 1985)

Personal information
- Full name: Emmily da Silva Pinheiro
- Nationality: Brazil
- Born: 3 November 1985 (age 40) Rio de Janeiro, Brazil
- Height: 1.68 m (5 ft 6 in)
- Weight: 58 kg (128 lb)

Sport
- Sport: Athletics
- Event: 4 × 400 metres relay
- Club: Sport Club Ulbra

Achievements and titles
- Personal best: 400 m: 53.05 s (2008)

Emmily da Silva Pinheiro (born November 3, 1985, in Rio de Janeiro) is a Brazilian sprinter, who specialized in the 400 metres.

== Biography ==
Pinheiro competed for the women's 4 × 400 m relay at the 2008 Summer Olympics in Beijing, along with her teammates Lucimar Teodoro, Maria Laura Almirão, and Josiane Tito. She ran on the third leg of the second heat, with an individual-split time of 51.95 seconds. Pinheiro and her team finished the relay in sixth place for a total time of 3:30.10, failing to advance into the final.

== Achievements ==
Year	Competition	Venue	Position	Event	Notes
Representing Brazil
2002	South American Youth Championships	Asunción, Paraguay	1st	400 m	56.58 s
2002	South American Youth Championships	Asunción, Paraguay	2nd	1000 metres Medley relay	2:14.55 min
