= Thaissa Presti =

Brazilian sprinter (born 1985)

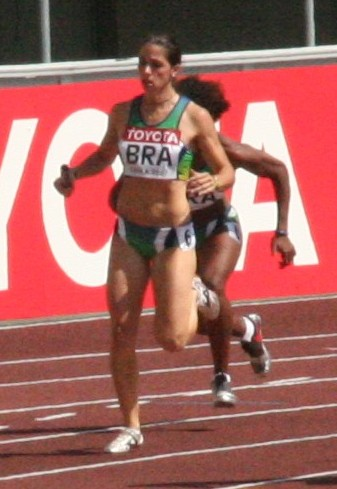
- Thaissa Presti in 2007

Personal information
- Born: November 7, 1985 (age 40) São Paulo, Brazil

Sport
- Sport: Track and field
Medal record
Women's athletics
Representing Brazil
Olympic Games
Bronze medal – third place	2008 Beijing	4 × 100 m relay

Thaissa Barbosa Presti (born November 7, 1985) is a track and field sprint athlete who competes internationally for Brazil.

Presti represented Brazil at the 2008 Summer Olympics in Beijing. She competed at the 4 × 100 metres relay together with Lucimar de Moura, Rosemar Coelho Neto and Rosângela Santos. In their first round heat they placed third behind Belgium and Great Britain, but in front of Nigeria. Their time of 43.38 seconds was the fifth time overall out of sixteen participating nations. With this result they qualified for the final in which they sprinted to a time of 43.14 seconds and the fourth place behind Nigeria, missing out on the bronze medal with 0.10 seconds. However, in 2016, the IOC stripped Russia of its Gold Medal due to doping, meaning Rosângela and her teammates inherited the bronze medal.

Thaissa is the daughter of former football player Zé Sérgio.
