= Armando dos Santos (bobsleigh) =

Brazilian bobsledder and hammer thrower

Armando dos Santos (born 14 January 1982) is a former Brazilian hammer thrower and bobsleigh competitor.

He helped his country qualify for the 2006 Winter Olympics in the 4-man event at the 2006 Challenge Cup. Australia was the highest-placed country to fail to qualify. The Australian Olympic Committee tried unsuccessfully to have the Brazilian team thrown out due to the use of drugs by dos Santos, so that Australia would take its place. Due to the positive test, dos Santos was replaced on the team by a fellow ex-athlete, Claudinei Quirino.
