= 2008 South American Under-23 Championships in Athletics – Results =

These are the full results of the 2008 South American Under-23 Championships in Athletics which took place between September 5 and September 7, 2008, at Villa Deportiva Nacional (VIDENA) in Lima, Peru.

== Men's results ==
=== 100 meters ===
Heat 1 – 5 September 16:00h
Wind: -0.6 m/s

Rank	Name	Nationality	Time	Notes
1	Nilson de Oliveira André	Brazil	10.54	Q
2	Franklin Nazareno	Ecuador	10.75	Q
3	Álvaro Cassiani	Venezuela	10.93	Q
4	Franco Boccardo	Chile	11.25	q
5	Rosendo Valiente	Peru	11.42	q

Heat 2 – 5 September 16:00h
Wind: +0.0 m/s

Rank	Name	Nationality	Time	Notes
1	Bruno Lins Tenorio de Barros	Brazil	10.66	Q
2	Cristián Reyes	Chile	11.06	Q
3	Santiago Vidovic	Bolivia	11.53	Q
4	Marcelo Bucheli	Ecuador	DNF	

Final – 6 September 9:55h
Wind: -2.0 m/s

Rank	Name	Nationality	Time	Notes
1st place, gold medalist(s)	Nilson de Oliveira André	Brazil	10.69	
2nd place, silver medalist(s)	Bruno Lins Tenorio de Barros	Brazil	10.70	
3rd place, bronze medalist(s)	Franklin Nazareno	Ecuador	10.84	
4	Cristián Reyes	Chile	11.09	
5	Álvaro Cassiani	Venezuela	11.12	
6	Franco Boccardo	Chile	11.47	
7	Rosendo Valiente	Peru	11.65	
8	Santiago Vidovic	Bolivia	11.77	

=== 200 meters ===
Final – 7 September 14:10h
Wind: -1.0 m/s

Rank	Name	Nationality	Time	Notes
1st place, gold medalist(s)	Bruno Lins Tenorio de Barros	Brazil	21.13	
2nd place, silver medalist(s)	Franklin Nazareno	Ecuador	21.38	
3rd place, bronze medalist(s)	Nilson de Oliveira André	Brazil	21.53	
4	Cristián Reyes	Chile	21.80	
5	José Vidal	Chile	22.53	
6	Santiago Vidovic	Bolivia	23.34	
	Rosendo Valiente	Peru	DNS	
	Álvaro Cassiani	Venezuela	DNS	

=== 400 meters ===
Heat 1 – 5 September 16:40h

Rank	Name	Nationality	Time	Notes
1	Andrés Silva	Uruguay	48.11	Q
2	Helder Correa Alves	Brazil	48.25	Q
3	Antonio Alvarado	Venezuela	48.37	Q
4	Geraldo Ramírez	Peru	49.83	q
5	José Vidal	Chile	51.35	

Heat 2 – 5 September 16:40h

Rank	Name	Nationality	Time	Notes
1	Wallace Magalhães Daflon Vieira	Brazil	48.22	Q
2	Rubén Headly	Venezuela	48.34	Q
3	Diego Ramos	Chile	48.82	Q
4	Julio Pérez	Peru	48.89	q

Final – 6 September 10:15h

Rank	Name	Nationality	Time	Notes
1st place, gold medalist(s)	Andrés Silva	Uruguay	46.73	
2nd place, silver medalist(s)	Helder Correa Alves	Brazil	46.95	
3rd place, bronze medalist(s)	Rubén Headly	Venezuela	47.94	
4	Diego Ramos	Chile	49.09	
5	Julio Pérez	Peru	49.28	
6	Geraldo Ramírez	Peru	50.13	
	Antonio Alvarado	Venezuela	DNS	
	Wallace Magalhães Daflon Vieira	Brazil	DNS	

=== 800 meters ===
Final – 7 September 14:30h

Rank	Name	Nationality	Time	Notes
1st place, gold medalist(s)	Fernando Lina da Silva	Brazil	1:50.09	
2nd place, silver medalist(s)	Diomar Noemio de Souza	Brazil	1:50.11	
3rd place, bronze medalist(s)	Ramón Michel	Venezuela	1:50.32	
4	Diego Rincón	Colombia	1:51.43	
5	Mauricio Valdivia	Chile	1:51.91	
6	Julio Alfredo Pérez	Peru	1:53.43	
7	José Luis Alarcón	Chile	1:54.68	
8	Freddy Espinoza	Colombia	1:55.07	
9	Alex Cisneros	Ecuador	1:55.95	
10	Lino Pérez	Panama	1:57.58	
	Andy Múñoz	Chile	DNS	

=== 1500 meters ===
Final – 5 September 17:00h

Rank	Name	Nationality	Time	Notes
1st place, gold medalist(s)	Mario Bazán	Peru	3:50.65	
2nd place, silver medalist(s)	Freddy Espinoza	Colombia	3:50.98	
3rd place, bronze medalist(s)	Mauricio Valdivia	Chile	3:52.11	
4	Jefferson Peña	Colombia	3:54.38	
5	Eduardo Gregorio	Uruguay	3:54.65	
6	Iván López	Chile	3:54.78	
7	Fábio de Teixeira Resende Queiroz	Brazil	3:55.07	
8	Jean Pierre Campos Ferrugem	Brazil	3:58.17	
9	Alex Cisneros	Ecuador	4:01.71	
10	José Lizarraga	Peru	4:04.78	
11	Juan Sánchez	Panama	4:07.75	

=== 5000 meters ===
Final – 7 September 15:00h

Rank	Name	Nationality	Time	Notes
1st place, gold medalist(s)	Robson Pereira de Lima	Brazil	14:24.25	
2nd place, silver medalist(s)	Mario Bazán	Peru	14:25.48	
3rd place, bronze medalist(s)	John Tello	Colombia	14:31.56	
4	Eduardo da Silva Antunes	Brazil	14:32.04	
5	Segundo Jami	Ecuador	14:38.68	
6	Jefferson Peña	Colombia	14:43.27	
7	Jaime Caldua	Peru	14:44.16	
8	Fabián Cajamarca	Ecuador	14:57.28	
9	Juan Sánchez	Panama	15:36.20	
10	Francisco Sanzana	Chile	15:57.28	
	Nicolás Cuestas	Uruguay	DNF	
	Pablo Mena	Chile	DNF	
	Jorge Fernández	Bolivia	DNS	

=== 10,000 meters ===
Final – 6 September 11:00h

Rank	Name	Nationality	Time	Notes
1st place, gold medalist(s)	Robson Pereira de Lima	Brazil	30:25.63	
2nd place, silver medalist(s)	Andrés Peña	Colombia	30:27.72	
3rd place, bronze medalist(s)	Segundo Jami	Ecuador	30:39.12	
4	Jaime Caldua	Peru	30:42.02	
5	Efrain Rafael Mamani	Peru	33:12.05	
6	Nicolás Cuestas	Uruguay	34:10.02	
7	Francisco Sanzana	Chile	35:08.45	
	Jorge Fernández	Bolivia	DNS	
	Reginaldo de Oliveira Campos Júnior	Brazil	DNS	

=== 3000 meters steeplechase ===
Final – 6 September 15:40h

Rank	Name	Nationality	Time	Notes
1st place, gold medalist(s)	Mario Bazán	Peru	8:52.95	
2nd place, silver medalist(s)	Eduardo da Silva Antunes	Brazil	8:57.49	
3rd place, bronze medalist(s)	Fabián Cajamarca	Ecuador	9:13.90	
4	Eduardo Gregorio	Uruguay	9:23.47	
5	Dubison Amézquita	Colombia	9:24.41	
6	Pablo Mena	Chile	9:27.46	
7	José Lizarraga	Peru	9:27.93	
8	Sérgio Murilo de Jesus Ferreira	Brazil	9:33.05	

=== 110 meters hurdles ===
Final – 6 September 9:30h
Wind: -2.5 m/s

Rank	Name	Nationality	Time	Notes
1st place, gold medalist(s)	Jorge McFarlane	Peru	14.24	
2nd place, silver medalist(s)	Luiz Alberto Cardoso de Araújo	Brazil	14.34	
3rd place, bronze medalist(s)	Éder Antônio Souza	Brazil	14.34	
4	Mariano Romero	Argentina	14.51	
5	Óscar Buttazoni	Chile	15.24	
6	Nicolás Cueto	Chile	15.41	
7	Javier McFarlane	Peru	15.93	

=== 400 meters hurdles ===
Final – 7 September 10:45h

Rank	Name	Nationality	Time	Notes
1st place, gold medalist(s)	Andrés Silva	Uruguay	51.33	
2nd place, silver medalist(s)	Thiago de Jesus Sales	Brazil	51.52	
3rd place, bronze medalist(s)	Ingo Stotz	Chile	52.81	
4	Víctor Solarte	Venezuela	53.25	
5	Douglas Soares Nazareth	Brazil	53.37	
6	Hugo Vilca	Peru	55.32	
7	Nicolás Cueto	Chile	56.23	

=== High jump ===
Final – 6 September 9:00h

Rank	Name	Nationality	Result	Notes
1st place, gold medalist(s)	Wanner Miller	Colombia	2.17	
2nd place, silver medalist(s)	Guilherme Henrique Cobbo	Brazil	2.14	
3rd place, bronze medalist(s)	Diego Ferrín	Ecuador	2.11	
4	Diego dos Santos Pereira de Araújo	Brazil	2.05	
5	Cristóbal Gómez	Chile	1.95	
	Vicente Aguirre	Chile	DNS	

=== Pole vault ===
Final – 7 September 9:00h

Rank	Name	Nationality	Result	Notes
1st place, gold medalist(s)	Germán Chiaraviglio	Argentina	5.10	
2nd place, silver medalist(s)	Denk Rolim Koubik	Brazil	4.60	
3rd place, bronze medalist(s)	Kelvin Rolim Koubik	Brazil	4.60	
4	Felipe Fuentes	Chile	4.40	
5	Ismael Villarino	Chile	4.40	

=== Long jump ===
Final – 7 September 11:00h

Rank	Name	Nationality	Result	Notes
1st place, gold medalist(s)	Jorge McFarlane	Peru	7.72 (+1.9 m/s)	
2nd place, silver medalist(s)	Hugo Chila	Ecuador	7.60 (+1.1 m/s)	
3rd place, bronze medalist(s)	Vicente Aguirre	Chile	7.29 (+0.5 m/s)	
4	Carlos Roberto Pio de Moraes Junior	Brazil	7.16 (+0.1 m/s)	
5	Álvaro Romero	Peru	7.04 (+0.0 m/s)	
6	Fabián Padrón	Venezuela	7.01 (+0.0 m/s)	
7	William Barrionuevo	Brazil	6.97 (+0.0 m/s)	
8	Diego Ferrín	Ecuador	6.83 (+0.0 m/s)	
9	Ignácio Ramírez	Chile	6.49 (+0.5 m/s)	
10	Iván Ortiz	Bolivia	6.07 (+0.8 m/s)	
	Peter Camacho	Venezuela	DNS	

=== Triple jump ===
Final – 6 September 11:00h

Rank	Name	Nationality	Result	Notes
1st place, gold medalist(s)	Hugo Chila	Ecuador	16.68 (+1.8 m/s)	
2nd place, silver medalist(s)	Hilton da Silva	Brazil	15.94 w (+2.9 m/s)	
3rd place, bronze medalist(s)	Heleno Garay Rodrigues	Brazil	15.48 w (+3.0 m/s)	
4	Peter Camacho	Venezuela	15.33 (+1.6 m/s)	
5	Wanner Miller	Colombia	14.54 (+1.8 m/s)	
6	Fabián Padrón	Venezuela	14.39 w (+2.6 m/s)	
7	Ignácio Ramírez	Chile	13.88 w (+2.8 m/s)	
	Iván Ortiz	Bolivia	DNS	

=== Shot put ===
Final – 6 September 9:00h

Rank	Name	Nationality	Result	Notes
1st place, gold medalist(s)	Raoni Marques de Morais	Brazil	17.43	
2nd place, silver medalist(s)	Eder Moreno	Colombia	17.03	
3rd place, bronze medalist(s)	Javier Eduardo Nieto	Peru	16.83	
4	Maximiliano Alonso	Chile	16.27	
5	Matías López	Chile	16.12	
6	Nicolás Martina	Argentina	15.82	
7	Gertymilluson Viera Maciel	Brazil	15.81	

=== Discus throw ===
Final – 7 September 11:00h

Rank	Name	Nationality	Result	Notes
1st place, gold medalist(s)	Gerson Carvalho dos Santos	Brazil	52.79	
2nd place, silver medalist(s)	Maximiliano Alonso	Chile	52.62	
3rd place, bronze medalist(s)	Raoni Marques de Morais	Brazil	51.58	
4	Mariano Etchehandy	Argentina	46.19	
	Javier Eduardo Nieto	Peru	DNS	
	Jorge Cuevas	Chile	DNS	

=== Hammer throw ===
Final – 5 September 14:50h

Rank	Name	Nationality	Result	Notes
1st place, gold medalist(s)	Jacobo de León	Colombia	57.73	
2nd place, silver medalist(s)	Allan da Silva Wolski	Brazil	56.30	
3rd place, bronze medalist(s)	Juan Manuel Charadia	Argentina	54.14	
4	Jorge Cuevas	Chile	54.02	
5	Everton Luiz Ribeiro	Brazil	52.26	
6	Gary Martín Osorio	Peru	51.03	
7	Fernando Aguirre	Peru	46.51	

=== Javelin throw ===
Final – 6 September 9:00h

Rank	Name	Nationality	Result	Notes
1st place, gold medalist(s)	Ignácio Guerra	Chile	74.55	
2nd place, silver medalist(s)	Víctor Abel Fatecha	Paraguay	69.69	
3rd place, bronze medalist(s)	Júlio César Miranda de Oliveira	Brazil	66.46	
4	François Pouzet	Chile	64.33	
5	Orielso Cabrera	Colombia	63.83	
6	Alejandro Ionski	Argentina	61.56	
7	Lauro César Freitas Mendes	Brazil	61.00	
8	Rubén Méndez	Ecuador	53.00	
	Benigno Ortega	Panama	DNS	

=== Decathlon ===
Final – 7 September 9:00h

The highest mark recorded in each event is highlighted in yellow

Rank	Name	Nationality	100m	LJ	SP	HJ	400m	110m H	DT	PV	JT	1500m	Points	Notes
1st place, gold medalist(s)	Danilo Mendes Xavier	Brazil	11.36 (1.8); 782pts	7.22; 866pts	12.56; 640pts	1.93; 740pts	50.26; 803pts	15.09 (0.0); 839pts	39.82; 661pts	4.40; 731pts	58.84; 720pts	4:44.42; 653pts	7435	
2nd place, silver medalist(s)	Anderson Estevão Venâncio	Brazil	11.21 (1.8); 814pts	6.89; 788pts	12.52; 638pts	1.93; 740pts	49.86; 821pts	15.29 (0.0); 815pts	39.25; 649pts	4.50; 760pts	62.32; 773pts	5:04.90; 521pts	7319	
3rd place, bronze medalist(s)	Damián Benedetich	Argentina	11.74 (1.8); 703pts	6.42; 679pts	12.69; 648pts	1.78; 610pts	53.34; 667pts	16.45 (0.0); 683pts	38.12; 626pts	3.40; 457pts	54.34; 653pts	5:03.89; 538pts	6264	
4	Vitorio Gotuzzo	Peru	11.80 (1.8); 691pts	6.40; 675pts	11.46; 574pts	1.84; 661pts	52.62; 698pts	17.05 (0.0); 619pts	33.63; 536pts	2.80; 309pts	47.54; 552pts	4:39.06; 686pts	6001	

=== 20,000 meters walk ===
Final – 7 September 7:00h

Rank	Name	Nationality	Time	Notes
1st place, gold medalist(s)	Juan Manuel Cano	Argentina	1:26:37	
2nd place, silver medalist(s)	Mauricio Arteaga	Ecuador	1:26:59	
3rd place, bronze medalist(s)	Pavel Chihuán	Peru	1:29:51	
4	Jonathan Riekmann	Brazil	1:30:06	
5	Yerko Araya	Chile	1:31:26	
6	Ferney Rojas	Colombia	1:32:16	
	Alex Tapia	Peru	DNF	
	Daniel Perim Tomasi	Brazil	DNF	
	Edward Araya	Chile	DQ	

=== 4x100 meters relay ===
Final – 6 September 17:00h

Rank	Nation	Competitors	Time	Notes
1st place, gold medalist(s)	Brazil	Ailson da Silva Feitosa; Nilson de Oliveira André; Bruno Lins Tenorio de Barros; Rafael da Silva Ribeiro	40.06	
2nd place, silver medalist(s)	Chile	Franco Boccardo; Cristián Reyes; José Vidal; Ingo Stotz	42.16	
3rd place, bronze medalist(s)	Peru	Álvaro Romero; Geraldo Ramírez; Javier McFarlane; Rosendo Valiente	42.77	
4	Ecuador	Marcelo Bucheli; Hugo Chila; Franklin Nazareno; Diego Ferrín	43.74	
	Venezuela		DNF	

=== 4x400 meters relay ===
Final – 7 September 15:50h

Rank	Nation	Competitors	Time	Notes
1st place, gold medalist(s)	Brazil	Bruno Lins Tenorio de Barros; Wagner Francisco Cardoso; Henrique Nogueira de Souza; Helder Correa Alves	3:09.02	
2nd place, silver medalist(s)	Venezuela	Antonio Alvarado; Víctor Solarte; Michel Ramón; Rubén Headly	3:15.19	
3rd place, bronze medalist(s)	Peru	Geraldo Ramírez; Hugo Vilca; Julio Pérez; Jorge McFarlane	3:16.89	
4	Chile	José Vidal; Mauricio Valdivia; Diego Ramos; Ingo Stotz	3:19.36	

== Women's results ==
=== 100 meters ===
Final – 6 September 9:45h
Wind: -2.5 m/s

Rank	Name	Nationality	Time	Notes
1st place, gold medalist(s)	Rosângela Oliveira Santos	Brazil	11.91	
2nd place, silver medalist(s)	Ana Cláudia Lemos Silva	Brazil	12.09	
3rd place, bronze medalist(s)	Patrícia Blanco	Venezuela	12.43	
4	María Navas	Venezuela	12.55	
5	Paola Mautino	Peru	12.75	
6	Maira Cano	Bolivia	13.15	
7	Amanda Quispe	Peru	13.18	
8	Marysabel Romero	Bolivia	13.39	

=== 200 meters ===
Final – 7 September 14:00h
Wind: -1.2 m/s

Rank	Name	Nationality	Time	Notes
1st place, gold medalist(s)	Ana Cláudia Lemos Silva	Brazil	24.06	
2nd place, silver medalist(s)	Vanda Ferreira Gomes	Brazil	24.88	
3rd place, bronze medalist(s)	María Navas	Venezuela	24.95	
4	Maira Cano	Bolivia	26.14	
5	Paola Mautino	Peru	26.29	
6	Marysabel Romero	Bolivia	26.81	

=== 400 meters ===
Final – 6 September 10:05h

Rank	Name	Nationality	Time	Notes
1st place, gold medalist(s)	Jailma Sales de Lima	Brazil	54.46	
2nd place, silver medalist(s)	Madelene Rondón	Venezuela	54.64	
3rd place, bronze medalist(s)	Elaine Dias Paixão	Brazil	56.70	
4	Karina Caicedo	Ecuador	57.14	
5	Leslie Arnez	Bolivia	59.61	
6	Mónica Vera	Peru	1:00.19	
	Yelena Alvear	Panama	DNF	
	Alison Sánchez	Bolivia	DQ	

=== 800 meters ===
Final – 7 September 14:20h

Rank	Name	Nationality	Time	Notes
1st place, gold medalist(s)	Madelene Rondón	Venezuela	2:05.85	
2nd place, silver medalist(s)	Muriel Coneo	Colombia	2:07.70	
3rd place, bronze medalist(s)	Thayra Francis dos Santos	Brazil	2:08.47	
4	Andrea Ferris	Panama	2:09.66	
5	Evangelina Thomas	Argentina	2:16.09	
6	Natalia dos Santos Oliveira	Brazil	2:17.08	
7	Yesica Huamán	Peru	2:24.17	

=== 1500 meters ===
Final – 6 September 10:25h

Rank	Name	Nationality	Time	Notes
1st place, gold medalist(s)	Sabine Leticia Heitling	Brazil	4:34.42	
2nd place, silver medalist(s)	Muriel Coneo	Colombia	4:35.28	
3rd place, bronze medalist(s)	Andrea Ferris	Panama	4:36.61	
4	Inés Melchor	Peru	4:38.36	
5	Geisiane Mandelli de Lima	Brazil	4:44.53	
6	Evangelina Thomas	Argentina	4:45.16	
7	Viviana Acosta	Ecuador	4:45.52	
8	Yesica Huamán	Peru	5:01.99	

=== 5000 meters ===
Final – 5 September 17:20h

Rank	Name	Nationality	Time	Notes
1st place, gold medalist(s)	Inés Melchor	Peru	16:44.59	
2nd place, silver medalist(s)	Karina Villazana	Peru	16:54.96	
3rd place, bronze medalist(s)	Michele Cristina das Chagas	Brazil	17:04.55	
4	Viviana Acosta	Ecuador	17:07.69	

=== 10,000 meters ===
Final – 7 September 9:20h

Rank	Name	Nationality	Time	Notes
1st place, gold medalist(s)	Inés Melchor	Peru	35:43.27	
2nd place, silver medalist(s)	Karina Villazana	Peru	36:07.43	
	Michele Cristina das Chagas	Brazil	DNF	

=== 3000 meters steeplechase ===
Final – 6 September 15:20h

Rank	Name	Nationality	Time	Notes
1st place, gold medalist(s)	Sabine Leticia Heitling	Brazil	10:17.35	
2nd place, silver medalist(s)	Isabel Cristina Feliciano da Silva	Brazil	10:36.40	
3rd place, bronze medalist(s)	Ingrid Galloso	Chile	10:39.82	
4	Yoni Ninahuamán	Peru	10:57.65	
5	Cinthya Páucar	Peru	12:14.65	

=== 100 meters hurdles ===
Final – 6 September 9:20h
Wind: -2.1 m/s

Rank	Name	Nationality	Time	Notes
1st place, gold medalist(s)	Fabiana dos Santos	Brazil	14.25	
2nd place, silver medalist(s)	Giselle Marculino de Albuquerque	Brazil	14.74	
3rd place, bronze medalist(s)	Giuliana Franciosi	Peru	14.85	
4	Ljubica Milos	Chile	14.98	
5	Rocío Rodrich	Peru	15.53	

=== 400 meters hurdles ===
Final – 7 September 10:30h

Rank	Name	Nationality	Time	Notes
1st place, gold medalist(s)	Higlécia Silva de Oliveira	Brazil	59.71	
2nd place, silver medalist(s)	Aline Lopes da Silva	Brazil	1:01.34	
3rd place, bronze medalist(s)	Karina Caicedo	Ecuador	1:01.60	
4	Déborah Rodríguez	Uruguay	1:02.91	
5	Alison Sánchez	Bolivia	1:03.20	
6	Gabriela Munizaga	Chile	1:03.21	
7	Rocío Rodrich	Peru	1:06.39	
8	Violeta Gareca	Bolivia	1:06.74	

=== High jump ===
Final – 7 September 10:45h

Rank	Name	Nationality	Result	Notes
1st place, gold medalist(s)	Aline Fernanda Santos	Brazil	1.77	
2nd place, silver medalist(s)	Daiana Sturtz	Argentina	1.74	
2nd place, silver medalist(s)	Monique Varmeling	Brazil	1.74	
4	Valeria Paz	Argentina	1.74	
5	Florencia Vergara	Chile	1.68	
6	Michelle Ortiz	Peru	1.60	
	Gabriela Saravia	Peru	DNS	

=== Pole vault ===
Final – 5 September 14:40h

Rank	Name	Nationality	Result	Notes
1st place, gold medalist(s)	Sara Santos Pereira	Brazil	3.70	
2nd place, silver medalist(s)	Valeria Chiaraviglio	Argentina	3.50	
3rd place, bronze medalist(s)	Aline da Silva	Brazil	3.40	
4	Jéssica Fu	Peru	3.40	

=== Long jump ===
Final – 7 September 9:00h

Rank	Name	Nationality	Result	Notes
1st place, gold medalist(s)	Eliane Martins	Brazil	6.11 (+0.0 m/s)	
2nd place, silver medalist(s)	Verónica Davis	Venezuela	5.79 (+1.1 m/s)	
3rd place, bronze medalist(s)	Kauíza Moreira Venâncio	Brazil	5.73 (+0.0 m/s)	
4	Lorena Mina	Ecuador	5.66 (+1.2 m/s)	
5	Giuliana Franciosi	Peru	5.40 (+0.0 m/s)	
6	Michelle Ortiz	Peru	5.39 (+0.3 m/s)	
7	Guillercy González	Venezuela	5.34 (+0.0 m/s)	
8	Carla Cavero	Bolivia	5.23 (+0.0 m/s)	

=== Triple jump ===
Final – 7 September 14:30h

Rank	Name	Nationality	Result	Notes
1st place, gold medalist(s)	Verónica Davis	Venezuela	13.41 (+0.1 m/s)	
2nd place, silver medalist(s)	Simone de Oliveira	Brazil	13.07 (+0.7 m/s)	
3rd place, bronze medalist(s)	Lorena Mina	Ecuador	12.86 w (+2.3 m/s)	
4	Bianca Amaro dos Santos	Brazil	12.65 (+0.9 m/s)	
5	Francesca Oliva	Peru	11.62 (+0.2 m/s)	
	Carla Cavero	Bolivia	DNS	
	Paola Quiñónez	Colombia	DNS	

=== Shot put ===
Final – 7 September 14:30h

Rank	Name	Nationality	Result	Notes
1st place, gold medalist(s)	Natalia Ducó	Chile	17.77	
2nd place, silver medalist(s)	Anna Paula Magalhães Pereira	Brazil	15.32	
3rd place, bronze medalist(s)	Renata Tavares Severiano	Brazil	14.28	
4	Alessandra Gamboa	Peru	11.89	
	Rosa Rodríguez	Venezuela	DNS	
	Sandra Lemus	Colombia	DNS	

=== Discus throw ===
Final – 6 September 14:30h

Rank	Name	Nationality	Result	Notes
1st place, gold medalist(s)	Bárbara Rocío Comba	Argentina	54.03	
2nd place, silver medalist(s)	Andressa Oliveira de Morais	Brazil	51.24	
3rd place, bronze medalist(s)	Luz Montaño	Colombia	48.89	
4	Fernanda Raquel Borges	Brazil	45.30	
5	María Fátima Ramos	Peru	39.01	
6	Ana Diana Pereda	Peru	32.63	
	Rosa Rodríguez	Venezuela	DNS	

=== Hammer throw ===
Final – 6 September 11:00h

Rank	Name	Nationality	Result	Notes
1st place, gold medalist(s)	Rosa Rodríguez	Venezuela	64.76	
2nd place, silver medalist(s)	Marynna Santos de Jesus	Brazil	56.85	
3rd place, bronze medalist(s)	Marcela Solano	Chile	52.91	
4	Anna Paula Magalhães Pereira	Brazil	50.51	
5	Estela Parodi	Peru	40.42	
6	Ana Diana Pereda	Peru	23.36	

=== Javelin throw ===
Final – 5 September 16:30h

Rank	Name	Nationality	Result	Notes
1st place, gold medalist(s)	Diana Rivas	Colombia	50.64	
2nd place, silver medalist(s)	María Paz Ríos	Chile	48.58	
3rd place, bronze medalist(s)	Jucilene Sales de Lima	Brazil	48.44	
4	Paulina Antonio	Chile	44.59	
5	Antonella Ramognini	Argentina	42.50	
6	Milene dos Santos Matunaga	Brazil	38.42	
7	Diana Flores	Peru	34.88	
8	Alessandra Villarán	Peru	34.74	

=== 20,000 meters walk ===
Final – 6 September 0:00h

Rank	Name	Nationality	Time	Notes
1st place, gold medalist(s)	Johana Ordóñez	Ecuador	1:40:22	
2nd place, silver medalist(s)	Magaly Andrade	Ecuador	1:41:22	
3rd place, bronze medalist(s)	Ingrid Hernández	Colombia	1:41:49	
4	Milángela Rosales	Venezuela	1:45:13	
5	Sandra Galvis	Colombia	1:46:01	
6	Itiara Taiane Becker	Brazil	1:54:20	
7	Fariluz Morales	Peru	1:55:36	
8	Jheny Llactahuaman	Peru	1:58:47	
	Liliane Barbosa	Brazil	DQ	
	Bárbara Acuña	Chile	DQ	

=== Heptathlon ===
Final – 6 September 0:00h

The highest mark recorded in each event is highlighted in yellow

Rank	Name	Nationality	100m H	HJ	SP	200m	LJ	JT	800m	Points	Notes
1st place, gold medalist(s)	Vanessa Chefer Spinola	Brazil	14.83; 864pts	1.65; 795pts	12.53; 696pts	25.81; 814pts	5.52; 706pts	35.92; 590pts	2:31.63; 673pts	5138	
2nd place, silver medalist(s)	Karine Rambo Farias	Brazil	15.49; 778pts	1.59; 724pts	11.91; 655pts	26.85; 725pts	5.54; 712pts	32.52; 501pts	2:22.76; 787pts	4981	
3rd place, bronze medalist(s)	Agustina Zerboni	Argentina	14.39; 924pts	1.59; 724pts	10.40; 556pts	26.41; 762pts	5.73; 768pts	36.39; 599pts	2:48.74; 587pts	4820	
4	María de la Paz Azatto	Argentina	14.59; 897pts	1.62; 759pts	11.40; 621pts	27.55; 667pts	5.24; 626pts	33.09; 536pts	2:59.36; 371pts	4477	

=== 4x100 meters relay ===
Final – 6 September 16:40h

Rank	Nation	Competitors	Time	Notes
1st place, gold medalist(s)	Brazil	Ana Cláudia Lemos Silva; Rosângela Oliveira Santos; Franciela das Graças Krasucki; Vanda Ferreira Gomes	45.76	
2nd place, silver medalist(s)	Peru	Amanda Quispe; Rocío Rodrich; Mónica Vera; Paola Mautino	48.65	
3rd place, bronze medalist(s)	Bolivia	Leslie Arnez; Maira Cano; Marysabel Romero; Alison Sánchez	48.79	
	Venezuela		DNS	

=== 4x400 meters relay ===
Final – 7 September 15:30h

Rank	Nation	Competitors	Time	Notes
1st place, gold medalist(s)	Brazil	Aline Lopes da Silva; Higlécia Silva de Oliveira; Elaine Dias Paixão; Jailma Sales de Lima	3:43.30	
2nd place, silver medalist(s)	Venezuela	Patrícia Blanco; Guillercy González; María Navas; Madelene Rondón	3:53.85	
3rd place, bronze medalist(s)	Peru	Amanda Quispe; Mónica Vera; Paola Mautino; Rocío Rodrich	4:00.12	
	Bolivia	Leslie Arnez; Maira Cano; Carla Cavero; Alison Sánchez	DQ	

== Note ==
The names of the Brazilian athletes were completed using the published list of participants.
