= 2008 South American Under-23 Championships in Athletics =

III South American Under-23 Championships in Athletics
- Dates: September 5–7
- Host city: Lima, Peru
- Venue: Estadio de la Villa Deportiva Nacional (VIDENA)
- Level: U-23
- Events: 44
- Participation: about 230 athletes from 11 nations

The 3rd South American Under-23 Championships in Athletics were held in Lima, Peru, at the Estadio de la Villa Deportiva Nacional (VIDENA) on September 5–7, 2008.

== Participation ==
Between 220 and 260 athletes from 11 countries were reported to participate in the event. An unofficial count through the result lists resulted in 230 participating athletes:

- Argentina (16)
- Bolivia (9)
- Brazil (74)
- Chile (34)
- Colombia (18)
- Ecuador (14)
- Panama (5)
- Paraguay (1)
- Peru (40)
- Uruguay (4)
- Venezuela (15)

== Medal summary ==
Detailed results can be found on the CBAt website, on the Fecodatle website, on the FEDACHI website and on the Tilastopaja website.

=== Men ===
Event	Gold		Silver		Bronze	
100 metres (-2.0 m/s)	Nilson Andrè (BRA)	10.69	Bruno de Barros (BRA)	10.70	Franklin Nazareno (ECU)	10.84
200 metres (-1.0 m/s)	Bruno de Barros (BRA)	21.13	Franklin Nazareno (ECU)	21.38	Nilson Andrè (BRA)	21.53
400 metres	Andrés Silva (URU)	46.73	Helder Alves (BRA)	46.95	Rubén Headly (VEN)	47.94
800 metres	Fernando Lina da Silva (BRA)	1:50.09	Diomar de Souza (BRA)	1:50.11	Ramón Michel (VEN)	1:50.32
1500 metres	Mario Bazán (PER)	3:50.65	Freddy Espinoza (COL)	3:50.98	Mauricio Valdivia (CHI)	3:52.11
5000 metres	Robson de Lima (BRA)	14:24.25	Mario Bazán (PER)	14:25.48	John Tello (COL)	14:31.56
10000 metres	Robson de Lima (BRA)	30:25.63	Andrés Peña (COL)	30:27.72	Segundo Jami (ECU)	30:39.12
3000 m steeplechase	Mario Bazán (PER)	8:52.95	Eduardo Antunes (BRA)	8:57.49	Fabián Cajamarca (ECU)	9:13.90
110 m hurdles (-2.5 m/s)	Jorge McFarlane (PER)	14.24	Luiz Alberto de Araújo (BRA)	14.34	Éder Antônio Souza (BRA)	14.34
400 m hurdles	Andrés Silva (URU)	51.33	Thiago Sales (BRA)	51.52	Ingo Stotz (CHI)	52.81
High jump	Wanner Miller (COL)	2.17	Guilherme Cobbo (BRA)	2.14	Diego Ferrín (ECU)	2.11
Pole vault	Germán Chiaraviglio (ARG)	5.10	Derik Koubik (BRA)	4.60	Kelvim Koubik (BRA)	4.60
Long jump	Jorge McFarlane (PER)	7.72 (1.9 m/s)	Hugo Chila (ECU)	7.60	Vicente Aguirre (CHI)	7.29
Triple jump	Hugo Chila (ECU)	16.68 (1.8 m/s)	Hilton da Silva (BRA)	15.94w (2.9 m/s)	Heleno Rodrigues (BRA)	15.48w (3.0 m/s)
Shot Put	Raoni de Morâes (BRA)	17.43	Eder Moreno (COL)	17.03	Javier Eduardo Nieto (PER)	16.83
Discus Throw	Gerson dos Santos (BRA)	52.79	Maximiliano Alonso (CHI)	52.61	Raoni de Morâes (BRA)	51.58
Hammer throw	Jacobo D'León (COL)	57.73	Allan da Silva Wolski (BRA)	56.30	Juan Manuel Charadía (ARG)	54.14
Javelin throw	Ignacio Guerra (CHI)	74.55	Víctor Fatecha (PAR)	69.69	Júlio César de Oliveira (BRA)	66.46
Decathlon	Danilo Xavier (BRA)	7435	Ânderson Venâncio (BRA)	7319	Damián Benedetich (ARG)	6264
20000 m Walk	Juan Manuel Cano (ARG)	1:26:37.0	Mauricio Arteaga (ECU)	1:26:59.0	Pavel Chihuán (PER)	1:29:51.0
4 x 100 metres relay	Brazil; Ailson da Silva Feitosa; Nilson Andrè; Bruno de Barros; Rafael da Silva Ribeiro	40.06	Chile; Franco Boccardo; Cristian Reyes; José Vidal; Ingo Stotz	42.16	Peru; Álvaro Romero; Geraldo Ramírez; Javier McFarlane; Rosendo Valiente	42.77
4 x 400 metres relay	Brazil; Bruno de Barros; Wagner Francisco Cardoso; Enrique Nogueira; Helder Alves	3:09.02	Venezuela; Antonio Alvarado; Víctor Solarte; Michel Ramón; Rubén Headly	3:15.19	Peru; Geraldo Ramírez; Hugo Vilca; Julio Pérez; Jorge McFarlane	3:16.89

=== Women ===
Event	Gold		Silver		Bronze	
100 metres (-2.5 m/s)	Rosângela Santos (BRA)	11.91	Ana Claudia Silva (BRA)	12.09	Patricia Blanco (VEN)	12.43
200 metres (-1.2 m/s)	Ana Claudia Silva (BRA)	24.06	Vanda Gomes (BRA)	24.88	María Navas (VEN)	24.95
400 metres	Jailma de Lima (BRA)	54.46	Madelene Rondón (VEN)	54.64	Elaine Paixão (BRA)	56.70
800 metres	Madelene Rondón (VEN)	2:05.85	Muriel Coneo (COL)	2:07.70	Thayra Francis dos Santos (BRA)	2:08.47
1500 metres	Sabine Heitling (BRA)	4:34.42	Muriel Coneo (COL)	4:35.28	Andrea Ferris (PAN)	4:36.61
5000 metres	Inés Melchor (PER)	16:44.59	Karina Villazana (PER)	16:54.96	Michele das Chagas (BRA)	17:04.55
10000 metres	Inés Melchor (PER)	35:43.27	Karina Villazana (PER)	36:07.43		
3000 m steeplechase	Sabine Heitling (BRA)	10:17.35	Isabel Cristina Feliciano da Silva (BRA)	10:36.40	Ingrid Galloso (CHI)	10:39.82 NR
100 m hurdles (-2.1 m/s)	Fabiana dos Santos (BRA)	14.25	Giselle de Albuquerque (BRA)	14.74	Giuliana Franciosi (PER)	14.85
400 m hurdles	Higlécia de Oliveira (BRA)	59.71	Aline Lopes da Silva (BRA)	1:01.34	Karina Caicedo (ECU)	1:01.60
High jump	Aline Fernanda Santos (BRA)	1.77	Monique Varmeling (BRA); Daiana Sturtz (ARG)	1.74		
Pole vault	Sara Pereira (BRA)	3.70	Valeria Chiaraviglio (ARG)	3.50	Aline da Silva (BRA)	3.40
Long jump	Eliane Martins (BRA)	6.11	Verónica Davis (VEN)	5.79 (1.1 m/s)	Kauiza Venâncio (BRA)	5.73
Triple jump	Verónica Davis (VEN)	13.41 (0.1 m/s)	Simone de Oliveira (BRA)	13.07 (0.7 m/s)	Lorena Mina (ECU)	12.86 (2.3 m/s)
Shot Put	Natalia Ducó (CHI)	17.77	Anna Pereira (BRA)	15.32	Renata Severiano (BRA)	14.28
Discus Throw	Rocío Comba (ARG)	54.03	Andressa de Morais (BRA)	51.24	Luz Montaño (COL)	48.89
Hammer throw	Rosa Rodríguez (VEN)	64.76	Marynna de Jesus (BRA)	56.83	Marcela Solano (CHI)	52.91
Javelin throw	Diana Rivas (COL)	50.64	María Paz Ríos (CHI)	48.58	Jucilene de Lima (BRA)	48.44
Heptathlon	Vanessa Spínola (BRA)	5138	Karine Farias (BRA)	4981	Agustina Zerboni (ARG)	4820
20000 m Walk	Johana Ordóñez (ECU)	1:40:22.0	Magali Andrade (ECU)	1:41:22.0	Ingrid Hernández (COL)	1:41:49.0
4 x 100 metres relay	Brazil; Ana Cláudia Lemos Silva; Rosângela Santos; Franciela Krasucki; Vanda Gomes	45.76	Peru; Amanda Quispe; Rocío Rodrich; Mónica Vera; Paola Mautino	48.65	Bolivia; Leslie Arnez; Maira Cano; Marisabel Romero; Alison Sánchez	48.79 NR
4 x 400 metres relay	Brazil; Aline Lopes da Silva; Higlécia de Oliveira; Elaine Paixão; Jailma de Lima	3:43.30	Venezuela; Patricia Blanco; Guillercy González; María Navas; Madelene Rondón	3:53.85	Peru; Amanda Quispe; Mónica Vera; Carla Cavero; Alison Sánchez	4:00.12

== Medal table (unofficial) ==
* Host nation (Peru)

Rank	Nation	Gold	Silver	Bronze	Total
1	Brazil	23	22	13	58
2	Peru*	6	4	6	16
3	Colombia	3	5	3	11
4	Venezuela	3	4	4	11
5	Argentina	3	2	3	8
6	Ecuador	2	4	6	12
7	Chile	2	3	5	10
8	Uruguay	2	0	0	2
9	Paraguay	0	1	0	1
10	Bolivia	0	0	1	1
10	Panama	0	0	1	1
Totals (11 entries)		44	45	42	131

== Team trophies ==
The placing tables for team trophy (overall team, men and women categories) were published.

=== Total ===
The host country is highlighted in lavender blue

Rank	Nation	Points
1st place, gold medalist(s)	Brazil	485
2nd place, silver medalist(s)	Peru	178
3rd place, bronze medalist(s)	Chile	118
4	Venezuela	94
5	Colombia	86
5	Argentina	83
7	Ecuador	75
8	Uruguay	29
9	Bolivia	18
10	Panama	7
11	Paraguay	6

=== Male ===
The host country is highlighted in lavender blue

Rank	Nation	Points
1st place, gold medalist(s)	Brazil	212
2nd place, silver medalist(s)	Peru	89
3rd place, bronze medalist(s)	Chile	85
4	Colombia	54
5	Ecuador	42
6	Argentina	40
7	Uruguay	26
7	Venezuela	26
9	Paraguay	6
10	Bolivia	1

=== Female ===
The host country is highlighted in lavender blue

Rank	Nation	Points
1st place, gold medalist(s)	Brazil	273
2nd place, silver medalist(s)	Peru	89
3rd place, bronze medalist(s)	Venezuela	68
4	Argentina	43
5	Chile	33
5	Ecuador	33
7	Colombia	32
8	Bolivia	17
9	Panama	7
10	Uruguay	3
