= Jorge McFarlane =

Peruvian athlete (born 1988)

Personal information
- Full name: Jorge Armando McFarlane Olazábal
- Born: February 20, 1988 (age 38) Lima, Peru
- Height: 1.85 m (6 ft 1 in)
- Weight: 70 kg (154 lb)

Sport
- Country: Peru
- Sport: Athletics
Medal record
Men's Athletics
Representing Peru
South American Championships
Gold medal – first place	2013 Cartagena	110 m hurdles
Silver medal – second place	2013 Cartagena	Long jump
Bolivarian Games
Bronze medal – third place	2009 Sucre	110 m hurdles
Bronze medal – third place	2009 Sucre	Long jump
- Updated on 23 January 2015

Jorge Armando McFarlane Olazábal (born 20 February 1988) is a Peruvian athlete competing in the 110 metres hurdles and long jump events. His younger brother, Javier McFarlane, is also an athlete.

== Personal bests ==
Outdoor

- 110m hurdles – 13.52 (wind: 0.0 m/s) (Cali, Colombia, 26 June 2016)
- Long jump – 8.10 m (wind: +0.7 m/s) (Sucre, Bolivia, 23 November 2009)
- Triple jump – 15.13 m (wind: +0.1 m/s) (São Paulo, Brazil, 8 July 2007)

Indoor

- 60m hurdles – 7.98 (Santiago, Chile, 23 February 2010)

== Competition record ==
Year	Competition	Venue	Position	Event	Notes
Representing Peru
2004	South American Youth Championships	Guayaquil, Ecuador	2nd	110 m hurdles	14.28 s (+1.2 m/s)
2004	South American Youth Championships	Guayaquil, Ecuador	8th	Triple jump	13.94 m
2004	South American Youth Championships	Guayaquil, Ecuador	5th	4 × 100 m relay	45.02 s
2005	World Youth Championships	Marrakesh, Morocco	22nd (h)	110 m hurdles (91.4 cm)	14.16 s (+0.2 m/s)
2005	South American Junior Championships	Rosario, Argentina	5th	110 m hurdles (106.7 cm)	15.01 (+1.3 m/s)
2005	South American Junior Championships	Rosario, Argentina	8th	Long jump	6.83 m
2006	World Junior Championships	Beijing, China	13th (sf)	110 m hurdles (99.0 cm)	13.97 s (-1.4 m/s)
2006	South American Under-23 Championships / South American Games	Buenos Aires, Argentina	3rd	110 m hurdles	14.43 w (+2.6 m/s)
2006	South American Under-23 Championships / South American Games	Buenos Aires, Argentina	5th	Long jump	7.18 m (+1.4 m/s)
2007	South American Championships	São Paulo, Brazil	4th	110 m hurdles	14.45 (-0.8 m/s)
2007	South American Championships	São Paulo, Brazil	6th	Long jump	7.37 m (+0.5 m/s)
2007	South American Junior Championships	São Paulo, Brazil	1st	110 m hurdles (99 cm)	13.94 (+0.0 m/s)
2007	South American Junior Championships	São Paulo, Brazil	1st	Long jump	7.52 m (-0.6 m/s)
2007	Pan American Junior Championships	São Paulo, Brazil	2nd	110 m hurdles (99.0 cm)	13.51 s (+0.9 m/s)
2007	Pan American Junior Championships	São Paulo, Brazil	1st	Long jump	7.59 m
2007	Pan American Junior Championships	São Paulo, Brazil	5th	Triple jump	15.13 m (+0.1 m/s)
2007	Pan American Games	Rio de Janeiro, Brazil	14th (h)	110 m hurdles	14.18 s
2007	Pan American Games	Rio de Janeiro, Brazil	12th	Long jump	7.30 m
2007	Universiade	Bangkok, Thailand	28th (h)	110 m hurdles	14.77 s
2007	Universiade	Bangkok, Thailand	30th (q)	Long jump	7.18 m
2008	Ibero-American Championships	Iquique, Chile	5th	110 m hurdles	14.40 s
2008	Ibero-American Championships	Iquique, Chile	5th	Long jump	7.37 m
2008	South American U-23 Championships	Lima, Peru	1st	110 m hurdles	14.24 (-2.5 m/s) A
2008	South American U-23 Championships	Lima, Peru	1st	Long jump	7.72 m (+1.9 m/s) A
2008	South American U-23 Championships	Lima, Peru	3rd	4 × 400 m relay	3:16.89 A
2009	Universiade	Belgrade, Serbia	16th (h)	110 m hurdles	14.30 s
2009	Bolivarian Games	Sucre, Bolivia	3rd	110 m hurdles	14.35 s A
2009	Bolivarian Games	Sucre, Bolivia	3rd	Long jump	8.11 m (+0.7 m/s) (NR) A
2010	South American Games / South American U23 Championships	Medellín, Colombia	1st	110 m hurdles	13.75 s
2010	South American Games / South American U23 Championships	Medellín, Colombia	1st	Long jump	8.09 m
2010	Ibero-American Championships	San Fernando, Spain	—	110 m hurdles	DNF
2010	Ibero-American Championships	San Fernando, Spain	7th	Long jump	7.57 m (-0.1 m/s)
2011	South American Championships	Buenos Aires, Argentina	2nd	110 m hurdles	13.77 s
2011	South American Championships	Buenos Aires, Argentina	1st	Long jump	7.95 m
2011	Universiade	Shenzhen, China	8th	110 m hurdles	13.82 s
2011	Universiade	Shenzhen, China	11th	Long jump	7.68 m
2011	World Championships	Daegu, South Korea	26th (q)	Long jump	7.66 m (+0.1 m/s)
2011	Pan American Games	Guadalajara, Mexico	9th (h)	110 m hurdles	13.72 s
2011	Pan American Games	Guadalajara, Mexico	4th	Long jump	7.78 m
2012	World Indoor Championships	Istanbul, Turkey	25th (h)	60m hurdles	8.16 s
2012	Ibero-American Championships	Barquisimeto, Venezuela	6th	Long jump	7.30 m (w)
2013	South American Championships	Cartagena, Colombia	1st	110 m hurdles	13.61 s (NR)
2013	South American Championships	Cartagena, Colombia	2nd	Long jump	8.01 m (w)
2013	World Championships	Moscow, Russia	28th (q)	110 m hurdles	13.93 s (-0.3 m/s)
2013	Bolivarian Games	Trujillo, Peru	1st	110 m hurdles	13.76 (-0.4 m/s)
2013	Bolivarian Games	Trujillo, Peru	1st	Long jump	7.80 m (+0.0 m/s)
2014	South American Games	Santiago, Chile	3rd	110 m hurdles	13.83 s
2014	South American Games	Santiago, Chile	7th	Long jump	7.53 m
2014	Ibero-American Championships	São Paulo, Brazil	1st	110 m hurdles	13.53 s (-0.3 m/s)
2014	Pan American Sports Festival	Mexico City, Mexico	6th	110m hurdles	13.81 A (-0.1 m/s)
2014	Pan American Sports Festival	Mexico City, Mexico	2nd	Long jump	8.01m A (+1.0 m/s)
2015	South American Championships	Lima, Peru	2nd	110 m hurdles	13.99 s
2015	South American Championships	Lima, Peru	4th	Long jump	7.60 m (w)
2015	Pan American Games	Toronto, Canada	14th (h)	110 m hurdles	13.73 s
2015	Pan American Games	Toronto, Canada	7th	Long jump	7.80 m (w)
2016	Ibero-American Championships	Rio de Janeiro, Brazil	3rd	110 m hurdles	13.64 s
2017	South American Championships	Asunción, Paraguay	4th	110 m hurdles	13.87 s (w)
2017	South American Championships	Asunción, Paraguay	8th	Long jump	7.39 m (w)
2017	Bolivarian Games	Santa Marta, Colombia	4th	110 m hurdles	14.23 s
2017	Bolivarian Games	Santa Marta, Colombia	2nd	Long jump	7.65 m
2018	South American Games	Cochabamba, Bolivia	–	Long jump	NM
2018	Ibero-American Championships	Trujillo, Peru	7th	110 m hurdles	14.61
