= 2005 South American Junior Championships in Athletics =

XXXVI South American Junior Championships in Athletics
- Dates: October 1–2
- Host city: Rosario, Argentina
- Venue: Estadio Municipal Jorge Newbery
- Level: Junior
- Events: 44
- Participation: about 294 athletes from 13 nations

The 36th South American Junior Championships in Athletics were held at the Estadio Municipal Jorge Newbery in Rosario, Argentina from October 1–2, 2005.

== Participation (unofficial) ==
Detailed result lists can be found on the Atletismo Rosario and on the "World Junior Athletics History" website. An unofficial count yields the number of about 294 athletes from about 13 countries: Argentina (60), Bolivia (1), Brazil (70), Chile (38), Colombia (21), Ecuador (16), Guyana (2), Panama (4), Paraguay (25), Peru (14), Suriname (2), Uruguay (17), Venezuela (24).

== Medal summary ==
Medal winners are published for men and women, and on the IAAF website. Complete results can be found on the Atletismo Rosario and on the "World Junior Athletics History" website.

=== Men ===
Event	Gold		Silver		Bronze	
100 metres	Rafael Ribeiro (BRA)	10.33	Andrés Murillo (COL)	10.53	Jorge Eufrásio dos Santos (BRA)	10.65
200 metres	Andrés Murillo (COL)	21.04	Rodrigo Bargas (BRA)	21.19	Adilson Blanco (BRA)	21.27
400 metres	Rodrigo Bargas (BRA)	47.04	Andrés Silva (URU)	47.84	Amilkar Torres (COL)	47.90
800 metres	Gilder Barboza (VEN)	1:52.03	Michael Ramos (VEN)	1:52.65	Cleber Bezerra (BRA)	1:52.74
1500 metres	Gilder Barboza (VEN)	3:55.54	Fernando Lina da Silva (BRA)	3:55.96	Mario Bazán (PER)	3:56.44
5000 metres	Marvin Blanco (VEN)	15:01.94	Pablo Mena (CHI)	15:05.59	Víctor Aravena (CHI)	15:08.21
10,000 metres	Alexander Meléndez (VEN)	31:02.07	William Castillo (ECU)	31:07.70	Marvin Blanco (VEN)	31:16.25
3000 metres steeplechase	Mario Bazán (PER)	8:57.23	José Peña (VEN)	9:13.74	Israel Mecabo (BRA)	9:19.54
110 metres hurdles	Éder de Souza (BRA)	13.95	Alexandre da Silva (BRA)	14.50	Federico Ruiz (ARG)	14.54
400 metres hurdles	Víctor Solarte (VEN)	51.30	Thiago Sales (BRA)	52.60	Miguel Calvo (VEN)	53.38
High jump	Leandro Piedrabuena (ARG)	2.09	Guilherme Gobbo (BRA)	2.09	Wanner Miller (COL)	2.06
Pole vault	Tomás González (CHI)	4.60	Rodrigo Tenorio (CHI)	4.50	Renato Oliveira (BRA)	4.40
Long jump	Hilton da Silva (BRA)	7.42	Hugo Chila (ECU)	7.42	Lindon Aguanche (COL)	7.31
Triple jump	Hugo Chila (ECU)	15.57	Hilton da Silva (BRA)	15.51	Heleno Rodrigues (BRA)	15.37
Shot put	Maximiliano Alonso (CHI)	17.33*	Abraham Ortega (VEN)	17.32*	Julio César Londoño (COL)	16.77*
Discus throw	Raoni de Morais (BRA)	54.96*	Gerson dos Santos (BRA)	52.31*	Maximiliano Alonso (CHI)	51.51*
Hammer throw	Rhaony Caldas (BRA)	61.21*	Gary Osorio (PER)	60.62*	Juan Charadía (ARG)	59.65*
Javelin throw	Júlio César de Oliveira (BRA)	71.46	Víctor Fatecha (PAR)	67.31	Alejandro Ionski (ARG)	60.52
Decathlon	Gonzalo Barroilhet (CHI)	7304*	Luiz Alberto de Araújo (BRA)	7267*	Anderson Venâncio (BRA)	6640*
10,000 metres track walk	Robinson Vivar (ECU)	43:01.55	Alex Tapia (PER)	43:02.27	Juan Manuel Cano (ARG)	43:03.34
4 × 100 metres relay	Brazil; Mario Gabriel; Jorge dos Santos; Nilson André; Rafael da Silva	40.48	Chile; Ricardo Díaz; Tomás González; Juan José Lavandero; Cristián Reyes	41.69	Colombia; Marco Ibarguen; Lindon Aguache; Hawer Murillo; Juan Maturana	41.74
4 × 400 metres relay	Brazil; Jonas Silva; Nil de Oliveira; Adilson Blanco; Rodrigo Bargas	3:09.95	Venezuela; Roberto Montes; Víctor Solarte; Gilder Barboza; José Céspedes	3:12.91	Colombia; Juan Maturana; Féderico Padilla; Hawer Murillo; Amilkar Torres	3:13.11

=== Women ===
Event	Gold		Silver		Bronze	
100 metres	Franciela Krasucki (BRA)	11.39	Yomara Hinestroza (COL)	11.71	Tatiane Ferraz (BRA)	11.84
200 metres	Franciela Krasucki (BRA)	23.54w	Yomara Hinestroza (COL)	23.87w	Josiane Valentim (BRA)	24.18w
400 metres	Alejandra Idrobo (COL)	54.20	Gisele Cruz (BRA)	54.98	Fernanda Mackenna (CHI)	55.23
800 metres	Muriel Coneo (COL)	2:10.57	Geisiane de Lima (BRA)	2:12.32	Diana Armas (ECU)	2:13.06
1500 metres	Geisiane de Lima (BRA)	4:35.38	Muriel Coneo (COL)	4:36.10	Rocío Huillca (PER)	4:39.12
3000 metres	Inés Melchor (PER)	9:50.87	Karina Villazana (PER)	9:59.68	Michele das Chagas (BRA)	10:13.28
5000 metres	Inés Melchor (PER)	17:05.78	Rocío Cántara (PER)	17:21.13	Michele das Chagas (BRA)	17:52.82
3000 metres steeplechase	Sabine Heitling (BRA)	10:41.11	Isabel Feliciano da Silva (BRA)	10:51.44	Ingrid Galloso (CHI)	11:04.45
100 metres hurdles	Fabiana Moraes (BRA)	14.01w	Gisele de Albuquerque (BRA)	14.01w	María Azzato (ARG)	14.14w
400 metres hurdles	Dalelque Ferreira (BRA)	60.55	Higlecia de Oliveira (BRA)	61.62	Karina Caicedo (ECU)	62.38
High jump	Marielys Rojas (VEN)	1.76	Verónica Davis (VEN)	1.76	Kauiza Venâncio (BRA)	1.73
Pole vault	Keisa Monterola (VEN)	3.60	Cláudia Vitória (BRA)	3.30	Aline da Silva (BRA)	3.10
Long jump	Eliane Martins (BRA)	6.41	Tânia Ferreira da Silva (BRA)	6.14	Verónica Davis (VEN)	5.95
Triple jump	Tânia Ferreira da Silva (BRA)	13.31w	Verónica Davis (VEN)	13.22w	Patrícia Venâncio (BRA)	12.68
Shot put	Rocío Comba (ARG)	14.98	Keely Medeiros (BRA)	14.33	Anna Pereira (BRA)	13.86
Discus throw	Rocío Comba (ARG)	51.97	Keely Medeiros (BRA)	44.97	Lisângela da Cruz (BRA)	43.87
Hammer throw	Rosa Rodríguez (VEN)	57.90	Marynna de Jesus (BRA)	56.63	Marcela Solano (CHI)	50.42
Javelin throw	Jucilene de Lima (BRA)	46.04	Mariela Aguer (ARG)	42.41	Katrina Subeldia (PAR)	42.38
Heptathlon	Jailma de Lima (BRA)	4962	Tamiris Delfino (BRA)	4813	Madeleine Rondón (VEN)	4804
10,000 metres track walk	Ingrid Hernández (COL)	49:49.64	Fariluz Morales (PER)	49:57.20	Magaly Andrade (ECU)	50:41.19
4 × 100 metres relay	Brazil; Tatiane Ferraz; Josiane Valentim; Patricia Venancio; Franciela Krasucki	45.25	Colombia; Nelcy Caicedo; Jackelin González; Alejandra Idrobo; Yomara Hinestroza	46.28	Venezuela; Madeleine Rondón; Jackeline Carabali; Patricia Blanco; Diomelys Motaban	47.33
4 × 400 metres relay	Colombia; Jackelin González; Muriel Coneo; Yomara Hinestroza; Alejandra Idrobo	3:44.80	Brazil; Higlecia de Oliveira; Dalelque Ferreira; Kamila Miranda; Gisele Cruz	3:45.00	Ecuador; Pamela Freire; Diana Armas; Karina Caicedo; Erika Chávez	3:45.66

== Medal table (unofficial) ==
* Host nation (Argentina)

Rank	Nation	Gold	Silver	Bronze	Total
1	Brazil	20	20	16	56
2	Venezuela	8	6	5	19
3	Colombia	5	5	6	16
4	Peru	3	5	2	10
5	Chile	3	3	5	11
6	Argentina*	3	1	5	9
7	Ecuador	2	2	4	8
8	Paraguay	0	1	1	2
9	Uruguay	0	1	0	1
Totals (9 entries)		44	44	44	132

== Final scoring per countries ==
Final scoring per countries were published.

=== Overall ===
The host country is highlighted in lavender blue

Rank	Nation	Points
1	Brazil	486
2	Venezuela	180
3	Colombia	165
4	Chile	150
5	Argentina	129
6	Peru	75
7	Ecuador	68
8	Uruguay	15
9	Paraguay	12
10	Panama	5
11	Guyana	2

=== Men ===
The host country is highlighted in lavender blue

Rank	Nation	Points
1	Brazil	218
2	Chile	100
2	Venezuela	100
4	Colombia	72
5	Argentina	55
6	Ecuador	44
7	Peru	31
8	Uruguay	12
9	Paraguay	8
10	Guyana	2
10	Panama	2

=== Women ===
The host country is highlighted in lavender blue

Rank	Nation	Points
1	Brazil	268
2	Colombia	93
3	Venezuela	80
4	Argentina	74
5	Chile	50
6	Peru	44
7	Ecuador	24
8	Paraguay	4
9	Panama	3
9	Uruguay	3
