= Franklin Nazareno =

Ecuadorian sprinter (born 1987)

Personal information
- Full name: Franklin Andrés Nazareno Macías
- Born: April 24, 1987 (age 39) Portoviejo, Ecuador
- Height: 1.79 m (5 ft 10 in)
- Weight: 85 kg (187 lb)

Sport
- Sport: Athletics
Medal record
Men's Athletics
Bolivarian Games
Bronze medal – third place	2009 Sucre	4x100 m relay
- Updated on 11 June 2014

Franklin Andrés Nazareno Macías (born 24 April 1987) is an Ecuadorian sprinter who specializes in the 200 metres. He was born in Portoviejo, Manabí. His personal best time is 20.47 seconds, achieved in June 2007 in Cochabamba. In the 100 metres he has 10.22 seconds, achieved in March 2007 in Cuenca and repeated this same brand in other different cities (La Paz) in the 2008 for becoming the best sprinter in the history of Ecuador and the athlete more often repeated the brand to enter the Beijing 2008 Olympic Games.

He finished sixth at the 2006 World Junior Championships. He also competed at the 2007 World Championships and the 2008 Olympic Games without reaching the final. In Beijing he placed 5th in his 100 metres heat in a time of 10.60 seconds, while he placed 8th in his 200 metres heat, running the distance in 21.26 seconds.

== Personal bests ==
- 100 m: 10.22 s A (wind: +1.1 m/s) – Cuenca, 10 March 2007
- 200 m: 20.47 s A (wind: +0.0 m/s) – Cochabamba, 3 June 2007
- 400 m: 47.52 s A – Quito, 7 September 2006

== Competition record ==
Year	Competition	Venue	Position	Event	Notes
2004	South American U23 Championships	Barquisimeto, Venezuela	12th (h)	100m	11.09 (wind: +0.1 m/s)
2004	South American U23 Championships	Barquisimeto, Venezuela	6th	200m	21.92 (wind: +0.0 m/s)
2004	South American U23 Championships	Barquisimeto, Venezuela	4th	4 × 100 m relay	41.73
2005	South American Junior Championships	Rosario, Argentina	4th	100 m	10.68 s (wind: +2.0 m/s)
2005	South American Junior Championships	Rosario, Argentina	4th	200 m	21.81 s (wind: +1.4 m/s)
2006	World Junior Championships	Beijing, China	25th (h)	100 m	10.64 s (wind: +0.6 m/s)
2006	World Junior Championships	Beijing, China	6th	200 m	21.25 s (wind: -1.1 m/s)
2006	South American Championships	Tunja, Colombia	6th	100 m	10.77 s A (wind: -2.0 m/s)
2006	South American Championships	Tunja, Colombia	9th (h)	200 m	22.15 s A (wind: -2.5 m/s)
2006	South American Championships	Tunja, Colombia	4th	4 × 100 m	40.56 s A
2006	South American Championships	Tunja, Colombia	5th	4 × 400 m	3:13.76 min A
2006	South American U23 Championships / South American Games	Buenos Aires, Argentina	2nd	100 m	10.45 (wind: +0.9 m/s)
2006	South American U23 Championships / South American Games	Buenos Aires, Argentina	1st	200 m	20.76 (wind: +2.3 m/s) w
2006	South American U23 Championships / South American Games	Buenos Aires, Argentina	5th	4 × 100 m relay	41.31
2006	South American U23 Championships / South American Games	Buenos Aires, Argentina	6th	4 × 400 m relay	3:21.52
2007	South American Championships	São Paulo, Brazil	2nd	100 m	10.37 s (wind: -0.7 m/s)
2007	South American Championships	São Paulo, Brazil	5th	200 m	20.73 s (wind: +0.4 m/s)
2007	South American Championships	São Paulo, Brazil	4th	4 × 100 m	40.05 s NR
2007	Pan American Games	Rio de Janeiro, Brazil	13th (sf)	100 m	10.44 s (wind: +0.1 m/s)
2007	Pan American Games	Rio de Janeiro, Brazil	12th (sf)	200 m	21.02 s (wind: +0.1 m/s)
2007	Universiade	Bangkok, Thailand	10th (sf)	100 m	10.67 s (wind: -2.0 m/s)
2007	Universiade	Bangkok, Thailand	7th	200 m	21.20 s (wind: +0.2 m/s)
2007	World Championships	Osaka, Japan	32nd (qf)	200 m	21.50 s (wind: +0.6 m/s)
2008	Ibero-American Championships	Iquique, Chile	2nd	100 m	10.60
2008	Ibero-American Championships	Iquique, Chile	6th	200 m	21.43
2008	Olympic Games	Beijing, China	52nd (h)	100 m	10.60
2008	Olympic Games	Beijing, China	49th (h)	200 m	21.26
2008	South American U23 Championships	Lima, Peru	3rd	100 m	10.84 (wind: -2.0 m/s)
2008	South American U23 Championships	Lima, Peru	2nd	200 m	21.38 (wind: -1.0 m/s)
2008	South American U23 Championships	Lima, Peru	4th	4 × 100 m relay	43.74
2009	ALBA Games	Havana, Cuba	2nd	100 m	10.39 s (wind: -1.3 m/s)
2009	ALBA Games	Havana, Cuba	2nd	200 m	21.08 s w (wind: +2.3 m/s)
2009	ALBA Games	Havana, Cuba	2nd	4 × 100 m	40.67 s
2009	South American Championships	Lima, Peru	8th	100 m	10.76 s (wind: +0.6 m/s)
2009	South American Championships	Lima, Peru	8th (h)	200 m	21.70 s (wind: -0.4 m/s)
2009	South American Championships	Lima, Peru	4th	4 × 100 m	41.41 s
2009	Universiade	Belgrade, Serbia	16th (sf)	100 m	10.63 s (wind: +0.1 m/s)
2009	Universiade	Belgrade, Serbia	19th (qf)	200 m	21.35 s (wind: +0.5 m/s)
2009	World Championships	Berlin, Germany	62nd (h)	100 m	10.71 s (wind: -0.8 m/s)
2009	World Championships	Berlin, Germany	54th (h)	200 m	21.84 s (wind: +0.1 m/s)
2009	Bolivarian Games	Sucre, Bolivia	5th	200 m	21.89 s A (wind: +0.0 m/s)
2009	Bolivarian Games	Sucre, Bolivia	3rd	4 × 100 m	39.80 s A
2010	Ibero-American Championships	San Fernando, Spain	12th (h)	100 m	10.63
2010	Ibero-American Championships	San Fernando, Spain	15th (h)	200 m	21.85
2011	South American Championships	Buenos Aires, Argentina	6th	100 m	10.71 s (wind: +0.0 m/s)
2011	South American Championships	Buenos Aires, Argentina	6th (h)	200 m	21.99 s (wind: +0.6 m/s)
2011	South American Championships	Buenos Aires, Argentina	5th	4 × 100 m	41.90 s
2011	ALBA Games	Barquisimeto, Venezuela	2nd (h)	100 m	10.67 s (wind: +1.5 m/s)
2011	ALBA Games	Barquisimeto, Venezuela	8th	200 m	21.69 s w (wind: +2.4 m/s)
2011	ALBA Games	Barquisimeto, Venezuela	3rd	4 × 100 m	40.73 s
2011	Universiade	Shenzhen, China	36th (qf)	200 m	21.94 s (wind: +0.0 m/s)
2011	Pan American Games	Guadalajara, Mexico	20th (h)	100 m	10.52 s A (wind: +1.2 m/s)
2011	Pan American Games	Guadalajara, Mexico	23rd (sf)	200 m	21.48 s A (wind: +0.1 m/s)
2011	Pan American Games	Guadalajara, Mexico	5th	4 × 100 m	39.76 s A
2012	Ibero-American Championships	Barquisimeto, Venezuela	11th (h)	100 m	10.88
2012	Ibero-American Championships	Barquisimeto, Venezuela	19th (h)	200 m	21.77
2012	Ibero-American Championships	Barquisimeto, Venezuela	3rd	4 × 100 m	40.83
2013	Bolivarian Games	Trujillo, Peru	5th	100 m	10.71 (wind: -0.3 m/s)
2013	Bolivarian Games	Trujillo, Peru	2nd	4 × 100 m relay	39.62
2013	Bolivarian Games	Trujillo, Peru	3rd	4 × 400 m relay	3:12.19
2014	South American Games	Santiago, Chile	11th (h)	100 m	10.81
2014	South American Games	Santiago, Chile	5th	4 × 100 m	40.41
2015	South American Championships	Lima, Peru	5th (h)	100m	11.13 (wind: -0.9 m/s)
2015	South American Championships	Lima, Peru	1st	4 × 100 m relay	39.94
