= Maximiliano Alonso =

Chilean athlete

Personal information
- Born: May 22, 1986 (age 40)
- Education: Fort Hays State University

Sport
- Sport: Athletics
- Event(s): Shot put, Discus throw
- College team: Fort Hays State Tigers

Maximiliano "Max" Alonso (born 10 October 1986) is a Chilean athlete specialising in the shot put and discus throw. He won a bronze medal in the shot put at the 2011 South American Championships.

== International competitions ==
Year	Competition	Venue	Position	Event	Notes
Representing Chile
2004	South American U23 Championships	Barquisimeto, Venezuela	8th	Shot put	13.68 m
2004	South American U23 Championships	Barquisimeto, Venezuela	5th	Discus throw	43.17 m
2005	South American Junior Championships	Rosario, Argentina	1st	Shot put (6 kg)	17.33 m
2005	South American Junior Championships	Rosario, Argentina	3rd	Discus throw (1.75 kg)	51.51 m
2006	South American Games / South American U23 Championships	Buenos Aires, Argentina	9th	Shot put	14.83 m
2006	South American Games / South American U23 Championships	Buenos Aires, Argentina	4th	Discus throw	50.81 m
2007	South American Championships	São Paulo, Brazil	6th	Discus throw	50.51 m
2008	Ibero-American Championships	Iquique, Chile	7th	Discus throw	51.04 m
2008	South American U23 Championships	Lima, Peru	4th	Shot put	16.27 m
2008	South American U23 Championships	Lima, Peru	2nd	Discus throw	52.62 m
2009	South American Championships	Lima, Peru	5th	Shot put	16.87 m
2009	South American Championships	Lima, Peru	6th	Discus throw	53.71 m
2010	Ibero-American Championships	San Fernando, Spain	11th	Shot put	17.36 m
2010	Ibero-American Championships	San Fernando, Spain	10th	Discus throw	54.02 m
2011	South American Championships	Buenos Aires, Argentina	3rd	Shot put	17.95 m
2011	South American Championships	Buenos Aires, Argentina	6th	Discus throw	54.02 m
2012	Ibero-American Championships	Barquisimeto, Venezuela	7th	Discus throw	54.72 m
2013	South American Championships	Cartagena, Colombia	6th	Shot put	17.22 m
2013	South American Championships	Cartagena, Colombia	4th	Discus throw	55.61 m
2013	Bolivarian Games	Trujillo, Peru	3rd	Shot put	17.53 m
2013	Bolivarian Games	Trujillo, Peru	3rd	Discus throw	53.84 m
2014	South American Games	Santiago, Chile	5th	Shot put	17.29 m
2014	South American Games	Santiago, Chile	7th	Discus throw	53.88 m
2014	Ibero-American Championships	São Paulo, Brazil	5th	Shot put	16.70 m
2014	Ibero-American Championships	São Paulo, Brazil	9th	Discus throw	53.73 m
2014	Pan American Sports Festival	Mexico City, Mexico	5th	Discus throw	54.00 m
2015	South American Championships	Lima, Peru	7th	Shot put	16.78 m
2015	South American Championships	Lima, Peru	5th	Discus throw	52.20 m

== Personal bests ==
Outdoor

- Shot put – 18.40 (Turlock 2011)
- Discus throw – 60.85 (Hays 2014)
- Hammer throw – 45.42 (Provo 2010)

Indoor

- Shot put – 18.34 (Manhattan 2011)
