= Sabine Heitling =

Brazilian steeplechase runner

Personal information
- Full name: Sabine Letícia Heitling
- Nationality: Brazil
- Born: July 2, 1987 (age 39) Santa Cruz do Sul, Rio Grande do Sul, Brazil
- Height: 1.67 m (5 ft 6 in)
- Weight: 52 kg (115 lb)

Sport
- Sport: Athletics
Medal record
Representing Brazil
Pan American Games
Gold medal – first place	2007 Rio de Janeiro	3000m steeplechase
Bronze medal – third place	2011 Guadalajara	3000m steeplechase
- Updated on 14 May 2013

Sabine Letícia Heitling (born 2 July 1987, in Santa Cruz do Sul) is a Brazilian athlete specializing in the 3000 metres steeplechase.

== Biography ==
Heitling's personal best in the event is 9:41.22 achieved in 2009 in London. This was the Brazilian and South American record on the steeplechase until 2016, when Juliana Paula dos Santos ran 3 seconds faster.

In 2013, Heitling tested positive for a banned stimulant Methylhexaneamine and was disqualified for 1 year. The ban lasted from 7 June 2013 to 6 June 2014.

== Competition record ==
Year	Competition	Venue	Position	Event	Notes
Representing Brazil
2002	South American Junior Championships / South American Games	Belém, Brazil	1st	3000 m s'chase	10:52.77
2002	South American Youth Championships	Asunción, Paraguay	2nd	2000 m s'chase	7:13.65
2003	South American Junior Championships	Guayaquil, Ecuador	2nd	1500 m	4:33.0
2004	World Junior Championships	Grosseto, Italy	26th (h)	3000m steeplechase	11:01.09
2004	South American Youth Championships	Guayaquil, Ecuador	4th	1500 m	4:35.2
2004	South American Youth Championships	Guayaquil, Ecuador	1st	2000 m s'chase	6:34.7
2005	Pan American Junior Championships	Windsor, Canada	1st	3000 m s'chase	10:04.71
2005	South American Junior Championships	Rosario, Argentina	1st	3000 m s'chase	10:41.11
2006	World Junior Championships	Beijing, China	11th	3000m steeplechase	10:28.32
2006	Lusophony Games	Macau	2nd	1500 m	4:26.78
2006	Lusophony Games	Macau	1st	5000 m	17:19.37
2006	South American U23 Championships / South American Games	Buenos Aires, Argentina	3rd	1500 m	4:28.57
2006	South American U23 Championships / South American Games	Buenos Aires, Argentina	2nd	3000 m s'chase	10:37.38
2007	Pan American Games	Rio de Janeiro, Brazil	7th	1500 m	4:19.21
2007	Pan American Games	Rio de Janeiro, Brazil	1st	3000 m s'chase	9:51.13
2007	World Championships	Osaka, Japan	43rd (h)	3000 m s'chase	10:19.57
2008	Ibero-American Championships	Iquique, Chile	1st	1500 m	4:18.78
2008	Ibero-American Championships	Iquique, Chile	1st	3000 m s'chase	9:54.70
2008	South American U23 Championships	Lima, Peru	1st	1500 m	4:34.42
2008	South American U23 Championships	Lima, Peru	1st	3000 m s'chase	10:17.35
2009	South American Championships	Lima, Peru	1st	3000 m s'chase	9:52.54
2009	Lusophony Games	Lisbon, Portugal	2nd	1500 m	4:17.68
2009	World Championships	Berlin, Germany	35th (h)	3000 m s'chase	9:50.96
2010	Ibero-American Championships	San Fernando, Spain	3rd	3000 m s'chase	9:56.02
2011	South American Championships	Buenos Aires, Argentina	4th	3000 m s'chase	10:28.34
2011	Universiade	Shenzhen, China	6th	3000 m s'chase	9:52.19
2011	Pan American Games	Guadalajara, Mexico	3rd	3000 m s'chase	10:10.98
