= Cristián Reyes =

Chilean sprinter (born 1986)

Personal information
- Full name: Cristián Eduardo Reyes Troncoso
- Nationality: Chile
- Born: 5 August 1986 (age 39) Concepción, Bío Bío, Chile
- Height: 1.80 m (5 ft 11 in)
- Weight: 72 kg (159 lb)

Sport
- Sport: Athletics
- Event: Sprint
Medal record
Men's athletics
South American Championships
Bronze medal – third place	2011 Buenos Aires	200m
Bronze medal – third place	2011 Buenos Aires	4x100m relay
Ibero-American Championships
Bronze medal – third place	2008 Iquique	200m
- Updated on 17 June 2014

Cristián Reyes (born 5 August 1986) is a Chilean sprinter who specializes in the 200 metres.

== Biography ==
He competed in the 200 metres event at the 2008 Olympic Games, but without reaching the final round.

His personal best time is 20.66 seconds, achieved in April 2008 in Santiago. He also has 10.55 seconds in the 100 metres, achieved in May 2007 in Santiago.

== Personal bests ==
- 100 m: 10.48 s (wind: +2.0 m/s) – (Argentina) Buenos Aires, 27 March 2010
- 200 m: 20.65 s (wind: +0.2 m/s) – (Mexico) Guadalajara, 26 October 2011
- 400 m: 47.31 s – (Chile) Santiago, 13 October 2007

== Competition record ==
Year	Competition	Venue	Position	Event	Notes
Representing Chile
2002	South American Youth Championships	Asunción, Paraguay	6th	200 m	21.83 s (wind: +3.4 m/s) w
2002	South American Youth Championships	Asunción, Paraguay	4th (heat)	400 m	50.87 s
2002	South American Youth Championships	Asunción, Paraguay	2nd	4 × 100 m relay	41.4 s
2002	South American Youth Championships	Asunción, Paraguay	2nd	1000 metres Medley relay	1:57.04 min
2004	South American U-23 Championships	Barquisimeto, Venezuela	4th (h)	400 m	48.05
2004	South American U-23 Championships	Barquisimeto, Venezuela	5th	4 × 400 m relay	3:13.79
2004	World Junior Championships	Grosseto, Italy	33rd (h)	400 m	48.14
2005	South American Junior Championships	Rosario, Argentina	2nd	4 × 100 m relay	41.69 s
2006	South American U23 Championships/ South American Games	Buenos Aires, Argentina	2nd	200m	20.88 s (wind: +2.3 m/s) w
2006	South American U23 Championships/ South American Games	Buenos Aires, Argentina	6th	4 × 100 m relay	41.87 s
2007	ALBA Games	Caracas, Venezuela	6th	100 m	10.51 w (wind: +2.3 m/s)
2007	ALBA Games	Caracas, Venezuela	4th	200 m	21.02 (wind: +2.0 m/s)
2007	South American Championships	São Paulo, Brazil	5th (h)	100 m	10.63 (wind: -0.8 m/s)
2008	Central American and Caribbean Championships	Cali, Colombia	20th (h)	100 m	10.69 (wind: +0.2 m/s)
2008	Central American and Caribbean Championships	Cali, Colombia	12th (sf)	200 m	21.07 (wind: +1.1 m/s)
2008	Ibero-American Championships	Iquique, Chile	3rd	200 m	21.14 s
2008	Olympic Games	Beijing, China	57th (h)	200 m	21.20 s
2008	South American U23 Championships	Lima, Peru	4th	100m	11.09 (wind: -2.0 m/s)
2008	South American U23 Championships	Lima, Peru	4th	200m	21.80 (wind: -1.0 m/s)
2008	South American U23 Championships	Lima, Peru	2nd	4 × 100 m relay	42.16
2010	Ibero-American Championships	San Fernando, Spain	15th (h)	100 m	10.69 s
2010	Ibero-American Championships	San Fernando, Spain	4th	200 m	21.33 s
2011	South American Championships	Buenos Aires, Argentina	8th (h)	100 m	10.66 (wind: -0.2 m/s)
2011	South American Championships	Buenos Aires, Argentina	3rd	200 m	21.09 s
2011	South American Championships	Buenos Aires, Argentina	3rd	4 × 100 m relay	40.83 s
2011	South American Championships	Buenos Aires, Argentina	4th	4 × 400 m relay	3:15.58 min
2011	Pan American Games	Guadalajara, Mexico	8th	200 m	20.97 s
2011	Pan American Games	Guadalajara, Mexico	4th (h)	4 × 100 m relay	39.68 s (NR)
2012	Ibero-American Championships	Barquisimeto, Venezuela	11th (h)	200 m	21.20 s
2012	Olympic Games	London, United Kingdom	5th	200 m	21.29 (wind: -0.1 m/s)
2013	Bolivarian Games	Trujillo, Peru	5th	200 m	21.48 (wind: +0.0 m/s)
2015	South American Championships	Lima, Peru	3rd (h)	200m	22.44 (wind: -0.7 m/s)
