= Wanner Miller =

Colombian high jumper (born 1987)

Personal information
- Full name: Wanner Miller Moreno
- Born: July 22, 1987 (age 38) Vigía del Fuerte, Antioquia, Colombia
- Height: 1.90 m (6 ft 3 in)
- Weight: 78 kg (172 lb)

Sport
- Country: Colombia
- Sport: Men's Athletics
Medal record
Men's Athletics
Representing Colombia
South American Championships
Silver medal – second place	2013 Cartagena	High jump
Bolivarian Games
Silver medal – second place	2009 Sucre	High jump
- Updated on 11 June 2014

Wanner Miller Moreno (born 22 July 1987 in Vigía del Fuerte) is a Colombian athlete specializing in the high jump. His personal best outdoors is 2.28 metres achieved in 2012 in Havana.

== Personal bests ==
- High jump: 2.28 m – (Cuba) Havana, 27 May 2012
- Triple jump: 15.56 m (wind: NWI) – (Colombia) Medellín, 1 August 2008

== Competition record ==
Year	Competition	Venue	Position	Event	Notes
Representing Colombia
2005	South American Championships	Cali, Colombia	6th	High jump	2.05 m
2005	Pan American Junior Championships	Windsor, Ontario, Canada	7th	High jump	2.05 m
2005	Bolivarian Games	Armenia, Colombia	4th	High jump	2.09 m
2005	South American Junior Championships	Rosario, Argentina	3rd	High jump	2.06 m
2005	South American Junior Championships	Rosario, Argentina	5th	Triple jump	14.85 m
2006	World Junior Championships	Beijing, China	31st (q)	High jump	2.05 m
2006	South American Championships	Tunja, Colombia	5th	High jump	2.10 m
2006	South American U23 Championships / South American Games	Buenos Aires, Argentina	2nd	High jump	2.11 m
2008	Central American and Caribbean Championships	Cali, Colombia	9th	High jump	2.05 m
2008	South American U23 Championships	Lima, Peru	1st	High jump	2.17 m
2008	South American U23 Championships	Lima, Peru	5th	Triple jump	14.54 m (wind: +1.8 m/s)
2009	Central American and Caribbean Championships	Havana, Cuba	2nd	High jump	2.19 m
2009	Bolivarian Games	Sucre, Bolivia	2nd	High jump	2.22 m A
2010	Ibero-American Championships	San Fernando, Spain	2nd	High jump	2.18 m
2010	Central American and Caribbean Games	Mayagüez, Puerto Rico	3rd	High jump	2.19 m
2011	South American Championships	Buenos Aires, Argentina	4th	High jump	2.17 m
2011	Central American and Caribbean Championships	Mayagüez, Puerto Rico	5th	High jump	2.16 m
2011	Pan American Games	Guadalajara, Mexico	9th	High jump	2.18 m
2012	Ibero-American Championships	Barquisimeto, Venezuela	1st	High jump	2.28 m
2012	Olympic Games	London, United Kingdom	9th	High jump	2.25 m
2013	South American Championships	Cartagena, Colombia	2nd	High jump	2.19 m
2013	Bolivarian Games	Trujillo, Peru	2nd	High jump	2.16 m
