= Hugo Chila =

Ecuadorian athlete (born 1987)

Personal information
- Full name: Hugo Dionisio Chila Ayoví
- Born: July 22, 1987 (age 38) Santo Domingo de los Colorados, Santo Domingo de los Tsáchilas, Ecuador
- Height: 1.75 m (5 ft 9 in)
- Weight: 64 kg (141 lb)

Sport
- Country: Ecuador
- Sport: Athletics
Medal record
Men's Athletics
Representing Ecuador
Bolivarian Games
Gold medal – first place	2009 Sucre	Triple jump
Silver medal – second place	2005 Armenia	Triple jump
Silver medal – second place	2009 Sucre	Long jump
Bronze medal – third place	2009 Sucre	4x100 m relay
- Updated on 22 June 2013

Hugo Dionisio Chila Ayoví (born 22 July 1987 in Santo Domingo de Los Tsáchilas) is an Ecuadorian long jumper and triple jumper.

== Career ==
He set a personal best and Ecuadorian record of 16.70 m in the triple jump at the 2009 World Championships in Athletics. He bettered this at the 2009 Bolivarian Games, jumping 17.03 m for the gold and a Games record. He also set a national record in the long jump competition at the 2009 Games, but his mark of 8.16 m was only enough for silver as Víctor Castillo produced a Championship record for the gold.

== Personal bests ==
- 100 m: 10.37 s A (wind: +1.1 m/s) – (Ecuador) Cuenca, 10 March 2007
- Long jump: 8.16 m A (wind: +0.0 m/s) – (Bolivia) Sucre, 23 November 2009
- Triple jump: 17.03 m A (wind: +0.3 m/s) – (Bolivia) Sucre, 25 November 2009

== Achievements ==
Year	Competition	Venue	Position	Event	Notes
Representing Ecuador
2004	South American U23 Championships	Barquisimeto, Venezuela	9th	Long jump	6.66 m (wind: -1.0 m/s)
2004	South American Youth Championships	Guayaquil, Ecuador	6th	Long jump	6.85 m
2004	South American Youth Championships	Guayaquil, Ecuador	3rd	Triple jump	15.30 m
2005	South American Championships	Cali, Colombia	2nd	Triple jump	15.91 m (wind: +0.3 m/s)
2005	South American Championships	Cali, Colombia	3rd	4 × 100 m relay	40.45 s
2005	South American Junior Championships	Rosario, Argentina	2nd	Long jump	7.42 m (wind: +1.1 m/s)
2005	South American Junior Championships	Rosario, Argentina	1st	Triple jump	15.57 m (wind: +1.4 m/s)
2005	Bolivarian Games	Armenia, Colombia	5th	Long jump	7.61 m A (wind: +1.7 m/s)
2005	Bolivarian Games	Armenia, Colombia	2nd	Triple jump	15.92 m A (wind: -2.1 m/s)
2006	World Junior Championships	Beijing, China	7th	Long jump	7.51 m (wind: +0.0 m/s)
2006	World Junior Championships	Beijing, China	2nd	Triple jump	16.49 m (wind: -0.4 m/s)
2006	South American Championships	Tunja, Colombia	4th	Long jump	7.84 m w A (wind: +3.5 m/s)
2006	South American Championships	Tunja, Colombia	1st	Triple jump	16.68 m w A (wind: +3.1 m/s)
2006	South American Championships	Tunja, Colombia	4th	4 × 100 m relay	40.56 s A
2006	South American U23 Championships / South American Games	Buenos Aires, Argentina	3rd	Long jump	7.53 m (wind: +0.7 m/s)
2006	South American U23 Championships / South American Games	Buenos Aires, Argentina	1st	Triple jump	16.12 m (wind: +1.4 m/s)
2006	South American U23 Championships / South American Games	Buenos Aires, Argentina	5th	4 × 100 m relay	41.31
2006	South American U23 Championships / South American Games	Buenos Aires, Argentina	6th	4 × 400 m relay	3:21.52
2007	South American Championships	São Paulo, Brazil	2nd	Long jump	7.81 m (wind: +0.8 m/s)
2007	South American Championships	São Paulo, Brazil	2nd	Triple jump	16.37 m (wind: +0.1 m/s)
2007	South American Championships	São Paulo, Brazil	4th	4 × 100 m relay	40.05 s NR
2007	Pan American Games	Rio de Janeiro, Brazil	7th	Long jump	7.60 m (wind: +0.7 m/s)
2007	Pan American Games	Rio de Janeiro, Brazil	9th	Triple jump	15.71 m (wind: +1.3 m/s)
2008	Ibero-American Championships	Iquique, Chile	6th	Long jump	7.30 m (wind: -1.3 m/s)
2008	Ibero-American Championships	Iquique, Chile	1st	Triple jump	16.31 m (wind: +0.0 m/s)
2008	Olympic Games	Beijing, China	24th (q)	Long jump	7.77 m (wind: +0.2 m/s)
2008	South American U23 Championships	Lima, Peru	2nd	Long jump	7.60 m (wind: +1.1 m/s) A
2008	South American U23 Championships	Lima, Peru	1st	Triple jump	16.68 m (wind: +1.8 m/s) A
2008	South American U23 Championships	Lima, Peru	4th	4 × 100 m relay	43.74
2009	ALBA Games	Havana, Cuba	4th (h)	100 m	10.84 s (wind: -0.5 m/s)
2009	ALBA Games	Havana, Cuba	7th	Long jump	7.34 m (wind: +0.7 m/s)
2009	ALBA Games	Havana, Cuba	6th	Triple jump	16.28 m w (wind: +2.6 m/s)
2009	ALBA Games	Havana, Cuba	2nd	4 × 100 m relay	40.67 s
2009	South American Championships	Lima, Peru	3rd	Long jump	7.51 m A (wind: -0.2 m/s)
2009	South American Championships	Lima, Peru	2nd	Triple jump	16.12 m A (wind: -0.8 m/s)
2009	South American Championships	Lima, Peru	5th	4 × 100 m relay	41.41 s A
2009	World Championships	Berlin, Germany	39th (q)	Long jump	7.54 m (wind: +1.0 m/s)
2009	World Championships	Berlin, Germany	20th (q)	Triple jump	16.70 m NR (wind: +0.2 m/s)
2009	Bolivarian Games	Sucre, Bolivia	2nd	Long jump	8.16 m A (wind: +0.0 m/s)
2009	Bolivarian Games	Sucre, Bolivia	1st	Triple jump	17.03 m GR A (wind: +0.3 m/s)
2009	Bolivarian Games	Sucre, Bolivia	3rd	4 × 100 m relay	39.80 A
2010	Ibero-American Championships	San Fernando, Spain	4th	Long jump	7.58 m (wind: +1.8 m/s)
2010	Ibero-American Championships	San Fernando, Spain	10th	Triple jump	13.61 m (wind: +0.9 m/s)
2011	ALBA Games	Barquisimeto, Venezuela	2nd	Long jump	7.66 m (wind: +0.1 m/s)
2011	ALBA Games	Barquisimeto, Venezuela	1st	Triple jump	15.69 m (wind: +0.2 m/s)
2011	ALBA Games	Barquisimeto, Venezuela	3rd	4 × 100 m relay	40.73 s
2011	South American Championships	Buenos Aires, Argentina	6th	Long jump	7.38 m (wind: +1.9 m/s)
2011	South American Championships	Buenos Aires, Argentina	5th	4x100	41.90 m
2011	Universiade	Shenzhen, China	15th (q)	Long jump	7.57 m (wind: +0.2 m/s)
2011	Universiade	Shenzhen, China	20th (q)	Triple jump	15.48 m
2011	Pan American Games	Guadalajara, Mexico	10th	Long jump	7.33 m (wind: -1.6 m/s)
2011	Pan American Games	Guadalajara, Mexico	10th	Triple jump	15.71 m
2011	Pan American Games	Guadalajara, Mexico	5th	4 x 100 metres relay	39.76 s A NR
2015	South American Championships	Lima, Peru	8th	Triple jump	15.02 m
