= Muriel Coneo =

Colombian runner (born 1987)

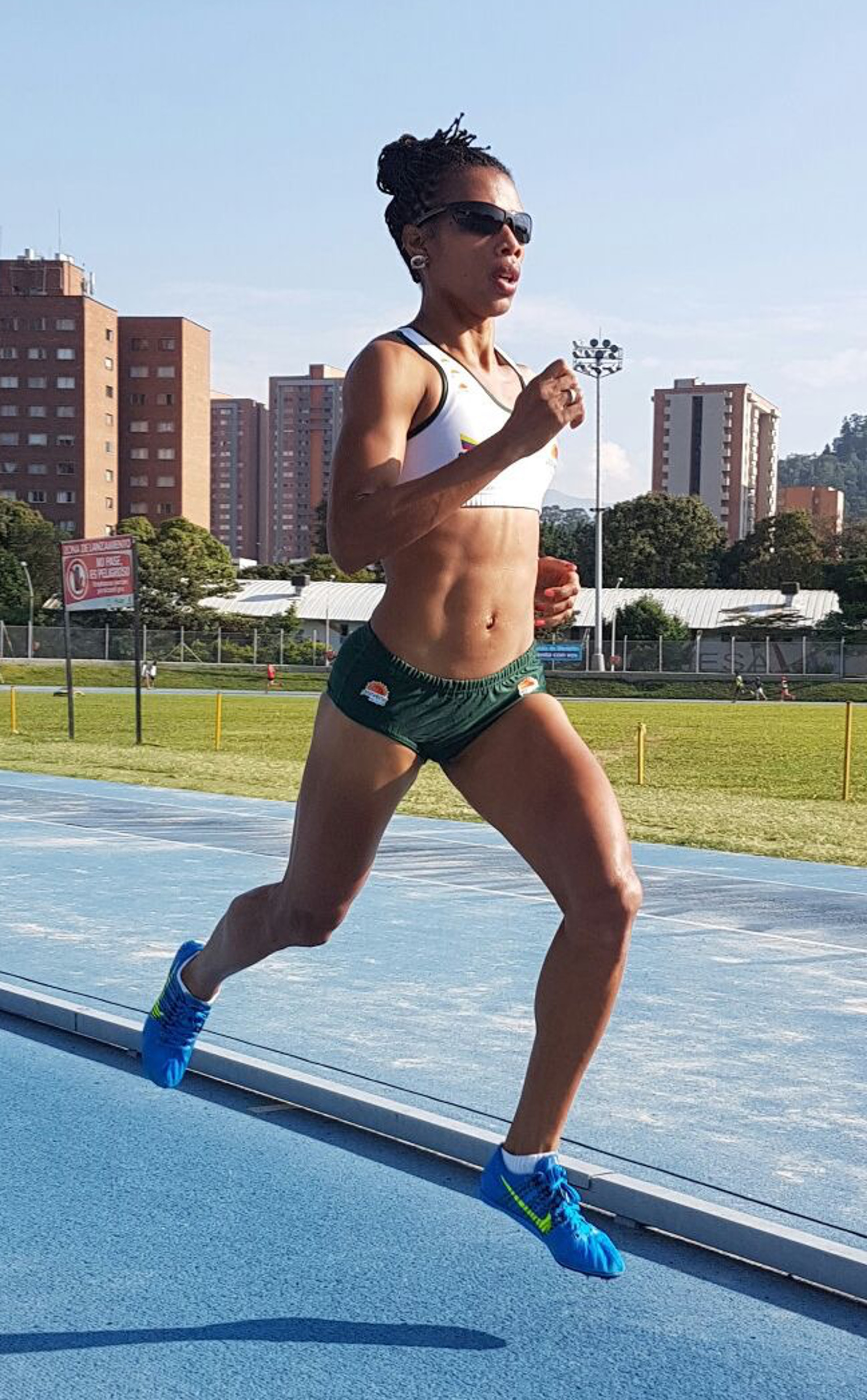

Personal information
- Full name: Muriel Coneo Paredes
- Nationality: Colombian
- Born: March 15, 1987 (age 39) Isla Fuerte, Cordoba, Colombia
- Height: 1.60 m (5 ft 3 in)
- Weight: 50 kg (110 lb)

Sport
- Country: Colombia
- Sport: Women's athletics
- Event: Middle-distance running
- Now coaching: Libardo Hoyos

Achievements and titles
- Personal bests: 800 m: 2:03.81 (2011); 1500 m: 4:06.99 NR (2016); 3000 m: 9:04.79 NR (2016); 3000 m s'chase: 9:43.16 (2016); 5000 m: 15:26.18 NR (2017)
Medal record
Representing Colombia
Women's athletics
Event	1st	2nd	3rd
Pan American Games	1	0	0
Ibero-American Championships	2	3	0
CAC Games	2	1	0
South American Games	5	0	0
South American Championships	4	5	6
Bolivarian Games	4	4	2
Total	18	13	8
Pan American Games
Gold medal – first place	2015 Toronto	1500 m
Ibero-American Championships
Gold medal – first place	2014 São Paulo	1500 m
Gold medal – first place	2016 Rio de Janeiro	1500 m
Silver medal – second place	2006 Ponce	4×400 m relay
Silver medal – second place	2014 São Paulo	3000 m
Silver medal – second place	2016 Rio de Janeiro	3000 m
Central American and Caribbean Games
Gold medal – first place	2014 Veracruz	1500 m
Gold medal – first place	2018 Barranquilla	5000 m
Silver medal – second place	2014 Veracruz	3000 m st.
South American Games
Gold medal – first place	2006 Buenos Aires	800 m
Gold medal – first place	2006 Buenos Aires	1500 m
Gold medal – first place	2014 Santiago	1500 m
Gold medal – first place	2014 Santiago	3000 m st.
Gold medal – first place	2018 Cochabamba	1500 m
South American Championships
Gold medal – first place	2015 Lima	1500 m
Gold medal – first place	2015 Lima	3000 m st.
Gold medal – first place	2017 Asunción	1500 m
Gold medal – first place	2017 Asunción	5000 m
Silver medal – second place	2006 Tunja	800 m
Silver medal – second place	2006 Tunja	4×400 m relay
Silver medal – second place	2007 São Paulo	800 m
Silver medal – second place	2009 Lima	1500 m
Silver medal – second place	2013 Cartagena	1500 m
Bronze medal – third place	2006 Tunja	1500 m
Bronze medal – third place	2009 Lima	800 m
Bronze medal – third place	2011 Buenos Aires	800 m
Bronze medal – third place	2013 Cartagena	3000 m st.
Bronze medal – third place	2019 Lima	10000 m
Bronze medal – third place	2023 São Paulo	5000 m
Bolivarian Games
Gold medal – first place	2009 Sucre	4×400 m relay
Gold medal – first place	2013 Trujillo	3000 m st.
Gold medal – first place	2017 Santa Marta	1500 m
Gold medal – first place	2017 Santa Marta	5000 m
Silver medal – second place	2009 Sucre	800 m
Silver medal – second place	2009 Sucre	1500 m
Silver medal – second place	2013 Trujillo	1500 m
Silver medal – second place	2022 Valledupar	1500 m
Bronze medal – third place	2005 Armenia-Pereira	800 m
Bronze medal – third place	2022 Valledupar	5000 m
- Updated on 4 September 2025

Muriel Coneo Paredes (March 15, 1987) is a Colombian Olympic athlete specializing in the middle-distance running events. She won multiple medals on the continental level, including the gold medal in the 1500 m at the 2015 Pan American Games and the 2014 Central American and Caribbean Games.

Muriel was born on Isla Fuerte, a Caribbean island belonging to the Bolívar Department, Colombia on March 15, 1987 as the oldest of four sisters between Carlos Coneo and Alicia Paredes. She began her athletic career aged 14 when she moved to Medellín in 2002 for training and competing in the Heptathlon. Later, under guidance of Libardo Hoyos, her current coach, she began to run middle distance events including 800 m and 1500 m in which she set several national records and competed at continental and world level as a junior athlete. In 2013, she began to train for 3000 metres steeplechase and the same year she placed first at the 2013 Bolivarian Games in Trujillo, Peru. In 2017, she ran her first international 5000 metres in the 2017 Mt. SAC Relays (Torrance, CA) where she set a PB of 15:41.55

== Competition record ==
Year	Competition	Venue	Position	Event	Notes
Representing Colombia
2004	South American Youth Championships	Guayaquil, Ecuador	4th	800 m	2:11.9
2004	South American Youth Championships	Guayaquil, Ecuador	6th	1500 m	4:36.2
2005	South American Championships	Cali, Colombia	5th	800 m	2:09.00
2005	Bolivarian Games	Armenia, Colombia	3rd	800 m	2:11.14 A
2005	South American Junior Championships	Rosario, Argentina	1st	800 m	2:10.57
2005	South American Junior Championships	Rosario, Argentina	2nd	1500 m	4:36.10
2005	South American Junior Championships	Rosario, Argentina	1st	4 × 400 m relay	3:44.80
2006	Ibero-American Championships	Ponce, Puerto Rico	4th	800 m	2:05.83
2006	Ibero-American Championships	Ponce, Puerto Rico	2nd	4 × 400 m relay	3:37.71
2006	Central American and Caribbean Games	Cartagena, Colombia	6th	800 m	2:08.27
2006	World Junior Championships	Beijing, China	22nd (sf)	800 m	2:13.15
2006	South American Championships	Tunja, Colombia	2nd	800 m	2:14.13
2006	South American Championships	Tunja, Colombia	3rd	1500 m	4:55.24
2006	South American Championships	Tunja, Colombia	2nd	4 × 400 m	3:37.12
2006	South American U23 Championships / South American Games	Buenos Aires, Argentina	1st	800m	2:07.78
2006	South American U23 Championships / South American Games	Buenos Aires, Argentina	1st	1500m	4:25.56
2007	South American Championships	São Paulo, Brazil	2nd	800 m	2:08.99
2007	South American Championships	São Paulo, Brazil	5th	1500 m	4:26.14
2008	Ibero-American Championships	Iquique, Chile	4th	800 m	2:04.46
2008	Ibero-American Championships	Iquique, Chile	5th	1500 m	4:24.90
2008	Central American and Caribbean Championships	Cali, Colombia	4th	800 m	2:07.7
2008	Central American and Caribbean Championships	Cali, Colombia	3rd	1500 m	4:28.92
2008	South American U23 Championships	Lima, Peru	2nd	800 m	2:07.70
2008	South American U23 Championships	Lima, Peru	2nd	1500 m	4:35.28
2009	South American Championships	Lima, Peru	3rd	800 m	2:07.32
2009	South American Championships	Lima, Peru	2nd	1500 m	4:23.38
2009	Bolivarian Games	Sucre, Bolivia	2nd	800 m	2:10.66 A
2009	Bolivarian Games	Sucre, Bolivia	1st	4 × 400 m relay	3:39.06 A
2010	Ibero-American Championships	San Fernando, Spain	6th	800 m	2:05.36
2010	Ibero-American Championships	San Fernando, Spain	5th	4 × 400 m relay	3:38.94
2011	South American Championships	Buenos Aires, Argentina	3rd	800 m	2:05.25
2011	South American Championships	Buenos Aires, Argentina	4th	1500 m	4:24.16
2011	Central American and Caribbean Championships	Mayagüez, Puerto Rico	6th	800 m	2:08.60
2011	Central American and Caribbean Championships	Mayagüez, Puerto Rico	4th	1500 m	4:25.45
2011	Universiade	Shenzhen, China	17th (h)	800 m	2:06.18
2011	Universiade	Shenzhen, China	8th (h)	1500 m	4:28.03
2013	South American Championships	Cartagena, Colombia	2nd	1500 m	4:15.84
2013	South American Championships	Cartagena, Colombia	3rd	3000 m s'chase	10:09.91
2013	Bolivarian Games	Trujillo, Peru	2nd	1500 m	4:09.79
2013	Bolivarian Games	Trujillo, Peru	1st	3000 m s'chase	10:00.09
2014	South American Games	Santiago, Chile	1st	1500 m	4:15.66
2014	South American Games	Santiago, Chile	1st	3000 m s'chase	10:05.02
2014	Ibero-American Championships	São Paulo, Brazil	1st	1500 m	4:14.42
2014	Ibero-American Championships	São Paulo, Brazil	2nd	3000 m	9:22.10
2014	Central American and Caribbean Games	Xalapa, Mexico	1st	1500 m	4:14.84 A
2014	Central American and Caribbean Games	Xalapa, Mexico	2nd	3000 m s'chase	10:07.94 A
2015	Pan American Cross Country Cup	Barranquilla, Colombia	7th	7 km	21:56
2015	Pan American Cross Country Cup	Barranquilla, Colombia	6th	Team - 7 km	89 pts
2015	South American Championships	Lima, Peru	1st	1500 m	4:10.14
2015	South American Championships	Lima, Peru	1st	3000 m s'chase	9:53.1
2015	Pan American Games	Toronto, Canada	1st	1500 m	4:09.05 NR
2015	World Championships	Beijing, China	22nd (sf)	1500 m	4:18.14
2015	World Championships	Beijing, China	34th (h)	3000 m s'chase	9:55.53
2016	Ibero-American Championships	Rio de Janeiro, Brazil	1st	1500 m	4:09.35
2016	Ibero-American Championships	Rio de Janeiro, Brazil	2nd	3000 m	9:04.79
2016	Olympic Games	Rio de Janeiro, Brazil	20th (h)	1500 m	4:09.50
2017	South American Championships	Asunción, Paraguay	1st	1500 m	4:16.46
2017	South American Championships	Asunción, Paraguay	1st	5000 m	16:16.64
2017	World Championships	London, United Kingdom	36th (h)	1500 m	4:11.98
2017	World Championships	London, United Kingdom	28th (h)	5000 m	15:26.18
2017	Bolivarian Games	Santa Marta, Colombia	1st	1500 m	4:15.64
2017	Bolivarian Games	Santa Marta, Colombia	1st	5000 m	16:08.29
2018	South American Games	Cochabamba, Bolivia	1st	1500 m	4:27.10
2018	South American Games	Cochabamba, Bolivia	–	5000 m	DNF
2018	Central American and Caribbean Games	Barranquilla, Colombia	5th	1500 m	4:25.72
2018	Central American and Caribbean Games	Barranquilla, Colombia	1st	5000 m	16:13.47
2019	South American Championships	Lima, Peru	6th	5000 m	16:34.58
2019	South American Championships	Lima, Peru	3rd	10,000 m	33:43.00
2019	Pan American Games	Lima, Peru	6th	1500 m	4:11.97
2021	South American Championships	Guayaquil, Ecuador	–	5000 m	DNF
2022	Ibero-American Championships	La Nucía, Spain	4th	1500 m	4:17.37
2022	Ibero-American Championships	La Nucía, Spain	5th	5000 m	16:12.69
2022	Bolivarian Games	Valledupar, Colombia	2nd	1500 m	4:17.77
2022	Bolivarian Games	Valledupar, Colombia	3rd	5000 m	17:23.45
2022	South American Games	Asunción, Paraguay	6th	1500 m	4:20.69
2022	South American Games	Asunción, Paraguay	6th	5000 m	16:20.53
2023	Central American and Caribbean Games	San Salvador, El Salvador	7th	5000 m	16:13.54
2023	Central American and Caribbean Games	San Salvador, El Salvador	5th	10,000 m	34:40.20
2023	South American Championships	São Paulo, Brazil	3rd	5000 m	16:20.82
2023	South American Championships	São Paulo, Brazil	5th	10,000 m	34:35.0

== Personal bests ==
- 800 metres – 2:03.81 (Fortaleza, 11 May 2011)
- 1500 metres – 4:06.99 (Huelva, 3 June 2016)
- 3000 metres steeplechase – 9:43.16 (Norwalk, 15 April 2016)
