= Mario Bazán =

Peruvian runner (born 1987)

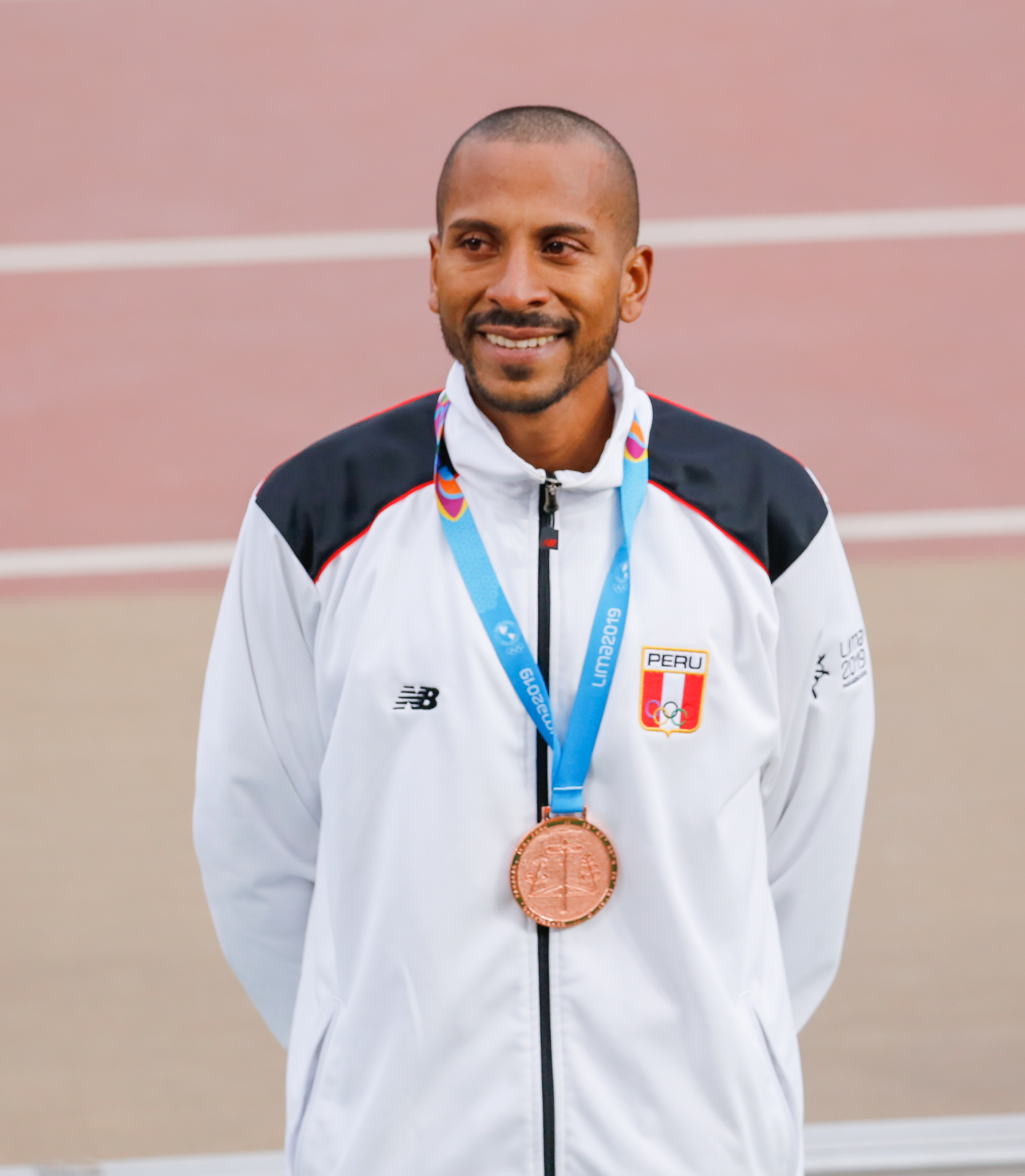
- Portrait of Mario Bazán

Personal information
- Full name: Mario Alfonzo Bazán Argandoña
- Nationality: Peru
- Born: 1 September 1987 (age 38) Lima, Peru
- Height: 1.75 m (5 ft 9 in)
- Weight: 64 kg (141 lb)

Sport
- Sport: Athletics
Medal record
Men's athletics
Representing Peru
Pan American Games
Bronze medal – third place	2019 Lima	3000 m s'chase
- Updated on 15 May 2013

Mario Bazán (born 1 September 1987 in Lima) is a Peruvian runner specializing in the 3000 metres steeplechase.

== Career ==
He competed at the 2012 Summer Olympics without reaching the final.

== Competition record ==
Year	Competition	Venue	Position	Event	Notes
Representing Peru
2004	South American Youth Championships	Guayaquil, Ecuador	2nd	3000 m	8:33.6
2004	South American Youth Championships	Guayaquil, Ecuador	2nd	2000 m s'chase	5:58.9
2005	South American Junior Championships	Rosario, Argentina	3rd	1500 m	3:56.44
2005	South American Junior Championships	Rosario, Argentina	1st	3000 m s'chase	8:57.23
2006	World Junior Championships	Beijing, China	18th (h)	3000 m s'chase	9:02.33
2006	South American U23 Championships / South American Games	Buenos Aires, Argentina	4th	1500m	3:52.69
2006	South American U23 Championships / South American Games	Buenos Aires, Argentina	1st	3000m s'chase	8:49.67
2007	Pan American Games	Rio de Janeiro, Brazil	11th	1500 m	3:51.38
2007	Pan American Games	Rio de Janeiro, Brazil	5th	3000 m s'chase	8:44.70
2008	Ibero-American Championships	Iquique, Chile	8th	1500 m	3:45:69
2008	Ibero-American Championships	Iquique, Chile	3rd	3000 m	7:57.95
2008	Ibero-American Championships	Iquique, Chile	1st	3000 m s'chase	8:42.51
2008	South American U23 Championships	Lima, Peru	1st	1500m	3:50.65
2008	South American U23 Championships	Lima, Peru	2nd	5000m	14:25.48
2008	South American U23 Championships	Lima, Peru	1st	3000m s'chase	8:52.95
2009	South American Championships	Lima, Peru	4th	1500 m	3:43.68 (NR)
2009	South American Championships	Lima, Peru	2nd	5000 m	13:57.37
2009	South American Championships	Lima, Peru	1st	3000 m s'chase	8:35.17
2009	World Championships	Berlin, Germany	21st (h)	3000 m s'chase	8:28.67 (NR)
2009	Bolivarian Games	Sucre, Bolivia	3rd	1500 m	3:54.70 A
2009	Bolivarian Games	Sucre, Bolivia	1st	3000 m s'chase	9.29.04 A
2010	Ibero-American Championships	San Fernando, Spain	–	3000 m s'chase	DNF
2011	South American Championships	Buenos Aires, Argentina	4th	3000 m s'chase	8:39.38
2011	World Championships	Daegu, South Korea	–	3000 m s'chase	DNF
2011	Pan American Games	Guadalajara, Mexico	7th	3000 m s'chase	8:56.31
2012	Olympic Games	London, United Kingdom	46th (h)	3000 m s'chase	8:51.95
2015	South American Championships	Lima, Peru	6th	3000 m s'chase	8:54.27
2016	Ibero-American Championships	Rio de Janeiro, Brazil	6th	3000 m s'chase	8:44.71
2017	South American Championships	Asunción, Paraguay	7th	1500 m	3:54.96
2017	South American Championships	Asunción, Paraguay	3rd	3000 m s'chase	8:51.97
2017	Bolivarian Games	Santa Marta, Colombia	6th	1500 m	3:50.79
2017	Bolivarian Games	Santa Marta, Colombia	4th	3000 m s'chase	8:42.52
2018	South American Games	Cochabamba, Bolivia	–	1500 m	DNF
2018	South American Games	Cochabamba, Bolivia	–	3000 m s'chase	DNF
2018	Ibero-American Championships	Trujillo, Peru	3rd^{1}	3000 m s'chase	8:40.23
2019	South American Championships	Lima, Peru	11th	1500 m	4:00.06
2019	South American Championships	Lima, Peru	4th	3000 m s'chase	8:44.48
2019	Pan American Games	Lima, Peru	3rd	3000 m s'chase	8:32.34
2021	South American Championships	Guayaquil, Ecuador	3rd	3000 m s'chase	8:36.71

^{1} Out of competition performance

== Personal bests ==
- 1000 metres – 2:25.32 (Belém 2006)
- 1500 metres – 3:43.68 (Lima 2009)
- 3000 metres – 7:57.95 (Iquique 2008)
- 5000 metres – 14:03.20 (Rio de Janeiro 2010)
- 3000 metres steeplechase – 8:28.67 (Berlin 2009)
