= 2006 South American Under-23 Championships in Athletics =

II South American Under-23 Championships in Athletics
- Dates: November 10–12
- Host city: Buenos Aires, Argentina
- Venue: Centro Nacional de Alto Rendimiento Deportivo (CeNARD)
- Level: U-23
- Events: 44
- Participation: 410 athletes from 11 nations

The 2nd South American Under-23 Championships in Athletics were held in Buenos Aires, Argentina, at the Centro Nacional de Alto Rendimiento Deportivo (CeNARD) on November 10–12, 2006. The championships were held as a part of the 2006 South American Games (ODESUR). A detailed report on the results was given.

== Participation ==
410 athletes from 11 countries participated in the event. However, an unofficial count through the result lists resulted only in 266 participating athletes:

- Argentina (55)
- Bolivia (6)
- Brazil (65)
- Chile (35)
- Colombia (35)
- Ecuador (17)
- Guyana (1)
- Paraguay (9)
- Peru (11)
- Uruguay (6)
- Venezuela (26)

== Medal summary ==
Medal winners are published. Detailed results can be found on the Fecodatle, on the CAU, on the CACAC website, on the CONSUDATLE website, and on the Tilastopaja website.

=== Men ===
Event	Gold		Silver		Bronze	
100 metres (0.9 m/s)	Kael Becerra (CHI)	10.33	Franklin Nazareno (ECU)	10.45 NR-j	Daniel Grueso (COL)	10.47
200 metres (2.3 m/s)	Franklin Nazareno (ECU)	20.76w	Cristián Reyes (CHI)	20.88w	Daniel Grueso (COL)	20.92w
400 metres	Andrés Silva (URU)	46.69	Geiner Mosquera (COL)	46.70	Josner Rodríguez (VEN)	46.94
800 metres	Kléberson Davide (BRA)	1:51.20	Eduard Villanueva (VEN)	1:51.24	Freddy Espinoza (COL)	1:51.34
1500 metres	Eduard Villanueva (VEN)	3:51.54	Cleveland Forde (GUY)	3:52.46	Eder da Silva (BRA)	3:52.63
5000 metres	Cleveland Forde (GUY)	14:07.08 NR	Joilson da Silva (BRA)	14:09.46	Sérgio Celestino da Silva (BRA)	14:09.85
10000 metres	Sérgio Celestino da Silva (BRA)	29:52.06	Jason Gutiérrez (COL)	30:17.19	Alexander de los Santos (URU)	30:28.93
3000 m steeplechase	Mario Bazán (PER)	8:49.67 NJR NR	José Gregorio Peña (VEN)	8:50.88 NJR	Santiago Figueroa (ARG)	8:54.50
110 m hurdles (2.6 m/s)	Rodrigo Pereira (BRA)	13.81w	Éder Souza (BRA)	13.82w	Jorge McFarlane (PER)	14.43w
400 m hurdles	Andrés Silva (URU)	50.46 NR	Raphael Fernandes (BRA)	50.55	Sebastián Lasquera (ARG)	51.60
High jump	Fábio Baptista (BRA)	2.14	Wanner Miller (COL)	2.11	Albert Bravo (VEN)	2.11
Pole vault	Germán Chiaraviglio (ARG)	5.65	Guillermo Chiaraviglio (ARG)	5.20	João Gabriel Sousa (BRA)	5.10
Long jump	Thiago Dias (BRA)	7.74 (0.3 m/s)	Louis Tristán (PER)	7.59w (2.7 m/s)	Hugo Chila (ECU)	7.53 (0.7 m/s)
Triple jump	Hugo Chila (ECU)	16.12 (1.4 m/s)	Thiago Dias (BRA)	16.00 (2.0 m/s)	Jhon Murillo (COL)	15.48 (1.7 m/s)
Shot Put	Germán Lauro (ARG)	19.78 NR	Jiovanny García (COL)	17.57	Gonzalo Riffo (CHI)	17.02
Discus Throw	Germán Lauro (ARG)	57.51	Ronald Julião (BRA)	55.13	Gustavo de Mendonça (BRA)	52.06
Hammer throw	Diego Gallardo (CHI)	63.95	Douglas dos Santos (BRA)	60.38	Max dos Santos (BRA)	60.03
Javelin throw	Víctor Fatecha (PAR)	75.45	Júlio César de Oliveira (BRA)	72.10	Ignacio Guerra (CHI)	70.10 NR-j
Decathlon	Carlos Eduardo Chinin (BRA)	7253	Luiz Alberto de Araújo (BRA)	7140	Gerardo Canale (ARG)	7013
20 km Walk	James Rendón (COL)	1:28:05	Oswaldo Ortega (ECU)	1:30:47	Yerko Araya (CHI)	1:31:31.0
4 x 100 metres relay	Venezuela; César Marchan; Jermaine Chirinos; Wilmer Rivas; Ronald Amaya	39.95	Brazil; Nilson de Oliveira André; Jorge Célio Sena; Bruno de Barros; Mauro da Silva	40.15	Colombia; Harlin Echavarría; Álvaro Gómez; Hawar Murillo; Daniel Grueso	40.20
4 x 400 metres relay	Brazil; Rodrigo Bargas; Kléberson Davide; Raphael Fernandes; Fernando de Almeida	3:08.38	Chile; Kael Becerra; Ingo Stotz; Pablo Navarrete; Ignacio Rojas	3:10.08	Colombia; Daniel Grueso; Amílcar Torres; Juan Pablo Maturana; Geiner Mosquera	3:11.28

=== Women ===
Event	Gold		Silver		Bronze	
100 metres (1.9 m/s)	Darlenis Obregón (COL)	11.73	Yomara Hinestroza (COL)	11.97	Carolina Díaz (CHI)	12.09
200 metres (1.7 m/s)	Darlenis Obregón (COL)	23.23	Wilmary Álvarez (VEN)	23.56	Vanda Gomes (BRA)	23.80
400 metres	Alejandra Idrovo (COL)	53.90	Wilmary Álvarez (VEN)	54.03	Ángela Alfonso (VEN)	54.89
800 metres	Muriel Coneo (COL)	2:07.78	Marcela Britos (URU)	2:08.97 NR	Nicole Manríquez (CHI)	2:09.84
1500 metres	Muriel Coneo (COL)	4:25.56 NJR	Isabel da Silva (BRA)	4:28.25	Sabine Heitling (BRA)	4:28.57
5000 metres	Lina Arias (COL)	16:52.04	Nadia Rodríguez (ARG)	16:54.31	Sandra Amarillo (ARG)	16:57.48
10000 metres	Lina Arias (COL)	35:16.74	Zuleima Amaya (VEN)	35:17.89	Nadia Rodríguez (ARG)	35:32.48
3000 m steeplechase	Ángela Figueroa (COL)	10:29.35	Sabine Heitling (BRA)	10:37.38	Ingrid Galloso (CHI)	10:50.46
100 m hurdles (1.9 m/s)	Soledad Donzino (ARG)	13.78	Fabiana Morães (BRA)	14.30	Giselle de Albuquerque (BRA)	14.43
400 m hurdles	Higlécia de Oliveira (BRA)	60.88	Keila Escobar (COL)	61.74	Daisy Ugarte (BOL)	61.95 NR
High jump	Marielys Rojas (VEN)	1.87 NR	Caterine Ibargüen (COL)	1.85	Daiana Sturtz (ARG)	1.79
Pole vault	Keisa Monterola (VEN)	4.10	Milena Agudelo (COL)	4.10	Patrícia dos Santos (BRA)	4.10
Long jump	Caterine Ibargüen (COL)	6.32 (1.1 m/s)	Tânia da Silva (BRA)	6.05 (-1.2 m/s)	Patrícia Venâncio (BRA)	6.01w (2.9 m/s)
Triple jump	Tânia da Silva (BRA)	13.35 (1.8 m/s)	Caterine Ibargüen (COL)	13.26w (2.5 m/s)	Mayra Pachito (ECU)	12.61 (0.7 m/s) NR
Shot Put	Natalia Ducó (CHI)	16.36 AYR NJR	Ahymará Espinoza (VEN)	15.06	Keely Medeiros (BRA)	14.57
Discus Throw	Karen Gallardo (CHI)	52.01 NR	Rocío Comba (ARG)	48.08	Lisângela da Cruz (BRA)	46.19
Hammer throw	Jennifer Dahlgren (ARG)	66.48	Johana Moreno (COL)	61.64	Rosa Rodríguez (VEN)	59.77
Javelin throw	Diana Rivas (COL)	50.91	Yusbelys Parra (VEN)	48.88	Juliana de Souza (BRA)	46.55
Heptathlon	Jailma de Lima (BRA)	5304	Madelene Rondón (VEN)	5266 NR-j	Miriam Quiñónez (ECU)	4945
20 km Walk	Yadira Guamán (ECU)	1:39:53	Luz Villamarín (COL)	1:39:59	Magaly Andrade (ECU)	1:48:26
4 x 100 metres relay	Colombia; Nelcy Caicedo; Alejandra Idrovo; Darlenis Obregón; Yomara Hinestroza	45.14	Chile; Stephanie Matute; María Fernanda Mackenna; Daniela Riderelli; Carolina Díaz	46.63	Venezuela; María Navas; Wilmary Álvarez; Ángela Alfonso; Luisely Jiménez	46.80
4 x 400 metres relay	Venezuela; Luisely Jiménez; Ángela Alfonso; María Navas; Wilmary Álvarez	3:41.30	Colombia; Darlenys Obregón; Shirley Aragón; Kelly López; Alejandra Idrovo	3:41.92	Ecuador; Diana Armas; Jessica Perea; Karina Caicedo; Erika Chavez	3:45.77

== Medal table (unofficial) ==
The medal count was published.

* Host nation (Argentina)

Rank	Nation	Gold	Silver	Bronze	Total
1	Colombia	12	11	7	30
2	Brazil	10	13	13	36
3	Venezuela	5	8	5	18
4	Argentina*	5	3	6	14
5	Chile	4	3	6	13
6	Ecuador	3	3	4	10
7	Uruguay	2	1	1	4
8	Peru	1	1	1	3
9	Guyana	1	1	0	2
10	Paraguay	1	0	0	1
11	Bolivia	0	0	1	1
Totals (11 entries)		44	44	44	132

* There is a mismatch between the unofficial medal count above and the published medal count. This is explained by the fact that the source reports that in the women's 20 km race walk competition, Magaly Andrade from Ecuador won the silver medal and Luz Villamarín from Colombia won bronze. However, all other sources and a special report on the race walking competitions list Luz Villamarín second and Magaly Andrade third.

== Team trophies ==
The placing tables for team trophy (overall team, men and women categories) were published.

=== Total ===
The host country is highlighted in lavender blue

Rank	Nation	Points
1st place, gold medalist(s)	Brazil	336
2nd place, silver medalist(s)	Colombia	276
3rd place, bronze medalist(s)	Argentina	174
4	Venezuela	173
5	Chile	131
6	Ecuador	90
7	Peru	35
8	Uruguay	30
9	Paraguay	19
10	Guyana	16
11	Bolivia	7

=== Male ===
The host country is highlighted in lavender blue

Rank	Nation	Points
1st place, gold medalist(s)	Brazil	198
2nd place, silver medalist(s)	Argentina	91
3rd place, bronze medalist(s)	Colombia	85
4	Venezuela	72
5	Chile	67
6	Ecuador	45
7	Peru	28
8	Uruguay	24
9	Guyana	16
10	Paraguay	11
11	Bolivia	3

=== Female ===
The host country is highlighted in lavender blue

Rank	Nation	Points
1st place, gold medalist(s)	Colombia	191
2nd place, silver medalist(s)	Brazil	138
3rd place, bronze medalist(s)	Venezuela	101
4	Argentina	83
4	Chile	64
6	Ecuador	45
7	Paraguay	8
8	Peru	7
9	Uruguay	6
10	Bolivia	4
