= Keely Medeiros =

Brazilian shot putter (born 1987)

Personal information
- Born: 30 April 1987 (age 39) Luziânia, Brazil
- Height: 1.75 m (5 ft 9 in)
- Weight: 100 kg (220 lb)

Sport
- Country: Brazil
- Sport: Track and field
- Event: Shot put
- Club: Pinheiros-SP

Keely Christinne Pinho Rodrigues Medeiros (born 30 April 1987) is a Brazilian athlete whose specialty is the shot put.

Medeiros competed for the Florida Gators track and field team in the NCAA.

She competed at the 2015 World Championships in Beijing without qualifying for the final. Her personal bests in the shot put are 17.58 metres outdoors (São Paulo 2014) and 16.98 metres indoors (Lexington 2012). She also has a personal best of 54.91 metres set in Des Moines in 2011.

== Competition record ==
Year	Competition	Venue	Position	Event	Notes
Representing Brazil
2005	South American Junior Championships	Rosario, Argentina	2nd	Shot put	14.33 m
2006	World Junior Championships	Beijing, China	11th	Shot put	14.68 m
2006	Lusophony Games	Macau, China	1st	Shot put	15.08 m
2006	South American Games / South American U23 Championships	Buenos Aires, Argentina	3rd	Shot put	14.57 m
2011	Pan American Games	Guadalajara, Mexico	–	Shot put	NM
2013	South American Championships	Cartagena, Colombia	5th	Shot put	16.86 m
2014	South American Games	Santiago, Chile	4th	Shot put	17.02 m
2014	Ibero-American Championships	São Paulo, Brazil	3rd	Shot put	16.95 m
2015	World Championships	Beijing, China	24th (q)	Shot put	15.17 m
2016	Ibero-American Championships	Rio de Janeiro, Brazil	5th	Shot put	17.25 m
2018	Ibero-American Championships	Trujillo, Peru	2nd	Shot put	16.64 m
2019	South American Championships	Lima, Peru	5th	Shot put	16.66 m
2021	South American Championships	Guayaquil, Ecuador	4th	Shot put	16.58 m
