= Rocío Comba =

Argentine discus thrower (born 1987)

Personal information
- Full name: Bárbara Rocío Comba
- Born: 14 July 1987 (age 39) Río Tercero, Córdoba
- Height: 1.80 m (5 ft 11 in)
- Weight: 90 kg (198 lb)

Sport
- Country: Argentina
- Sport: Athletics
- Event: Discus
- Updated on 27 January 2015

Bárbara Rocío Comba (born 14 July 1987) is an Argentine discus thrower.

She was born in Río Tercero. As a teenager she competed in the shot put, and finished tenth at the 2003 World Youth Championships and eighth at the 2006 World Junior Championships. Her personal best throw is 16.59 metres, achieved in July 2006 in São Caetano do Sul.

In the discus throw she finished fifth at the 2006 World Junior Championships. She also competed at the 2008, 2012 and 2016 Olympic Games and the 2009 and 2015 World Championships without reaching the final. She did, however, reach the finals of the 2013 World Championship in Moscow.

Her personal best is 62.77 metres, achieved in May 2013 in Belém, Brazil.

== Personal bests ==
- Shot put: 16.59 m – (Brazil) São Caetano do Sul, 22 July 2006
- Discus throw: 62.77 m – (Brazil) Belém, 12 May 2013
- Hammer throw: 49.88 m – (Argentina) Rosario, 2 October 2005

== Competition record ==
Year	Competition	Venue	Position	Event	Notes
Representing Argentina
2002	South American Youth Championships	Asunción, Paraguay	8th	Shot put	12.42 m
2002	South American Youth Championships	Asunción, Paraguay	3rd	Discus throw	39.98 m
2003	World Youth Championships	Sherbrooke, Canada	10th	Shot put	13.86 m
2004	South American Youth Championships	Guayaquil, Ecuador	1st	Shot put	14.65 m
2004	South American Youth Championships	Guayaquil, Ecuador	1st	Discus throw	43.30 m
2005	Pan American Junior Championships	Windsor, Canada	3rd	Shot put	14.41 m
2005	Pan American Junior Championships	Windsor, Canada	15th	Discus throw	34.26 m
2005	South American Junior Championships	Rosario, Argentina	1st	Shot put	14.98 m
2005	South American Junior Championships	Rosario, Argentina	1st	Discus throw	51.97 m
2005	South American Junior Championships	Rosario, Argentina	5th	Hammer throw	49.88 m
2006	Ibero-American Championships	Ponce, Puerto Rico	3rd	Shot put	15.11 m
2006	Ibero-American Championships	Ponce, Puerto Rico	4th	Discus throw	49.99 m
2006	World Junior Championships	Beijing, China	8th	Shot put	15.55 m
2006	World Junior Championships	Beijing, China	5th	Discus throw	52.42 m
2006	South American Championships	Tunja, Colombia	5th	Shot put	13.42 m
2006	South American Championships	Tunja, Colombia	5th	Discus throw	47.34 m
2006	South American U23 Championships / South American Games	Buenos Aires, Argentina	2nd	Discus throw	48.08 m
2007	South American Championships	São Paulo, Brazil	5th	Shot put	15.75 m
2007	South American Championships	São Paulo, Brazil	4th	Discus throw	51.01 m
2007	Pan American Games	Rio de Janeiro, Brazil	14th	Shot put	14.83 m
2007	Pan American Games	Rio de Janeiro, Brazil	9th	Discus throw	48.78 m
2008	Ibero-American Championships	Iquique, Chile	1st	Discus throw	54.49 m
2008	Olympic Games	Beijing, China	36th (q)	Discus throw	51.36 m
2008	South American U23 Championships	Lima, Peru	1st	Discus throw	54.03 m
2009	South American Championships	Lima, Peru	4th	Discus throw	51.72 m
2009	World Championships	Berlin, Germany	30th (q)	Discus throw	54.69 m
2010	Ibero-American Championships	San Fernando, Spain	12th	Discus throw	48.66 m
2011	South American Championships	Buenos Aires, Argentina	7th	Shot put	14.67 m
2011	South American Championships	Buenos Aires, Argentina	4th	Discus throw	53.67 m
2011	Pan American Games	Guadalajara, Mexico	6th	Discus throw	56.05 m
2012	Ibero-American Championships	Barquisimeto, Venezuela	5th	Discus throw	55.62 m
2012	Olympic Games	London, United Kingdom	26th (q)	Discus throw	58.98 m
2013	South American Championships	Cartagena, Colombia	2nd	Discus throw	58.75 m
2013	World Championships	Moscow, Russia	12th	Discus throw	62.39 m
2014	South American Games	Santiago, Chile	2nd	Discus throw	59.29 m
2014	Ibero-American Championships	São Paulo, Brazil	4th	Discus throw	57.57 m
2014	Pan American Sports Festival	Mexico City, Mexico	5th	Discus throw	57.11m A
2015	South American Championships	Lima, Peru	3rd	Discus throw	57.15 m
2015	Pan American Games	Toronto, Canada	8th	Discus throw	55.80 m
2015	World Championships	Beijing, China	28th (q)	Discus throw	56.11 m
2016	Ibero-American Championships	Rio de Janeiro, Brazil	3rd	Discus throw	56.75 m
2016	Olympic Games	Rio de Janeiro, Brazil	28th (q)	Discus throw	54.06 m
2017	South American Championships	Asunción, Paraguay	4th	Shot put	14.01 m
2017	South American Championships	Asunción, Paraguay	4th	Discus throw	56.14 m
