= Jailma de Lima =

Brazilian hurdler (born 1986)

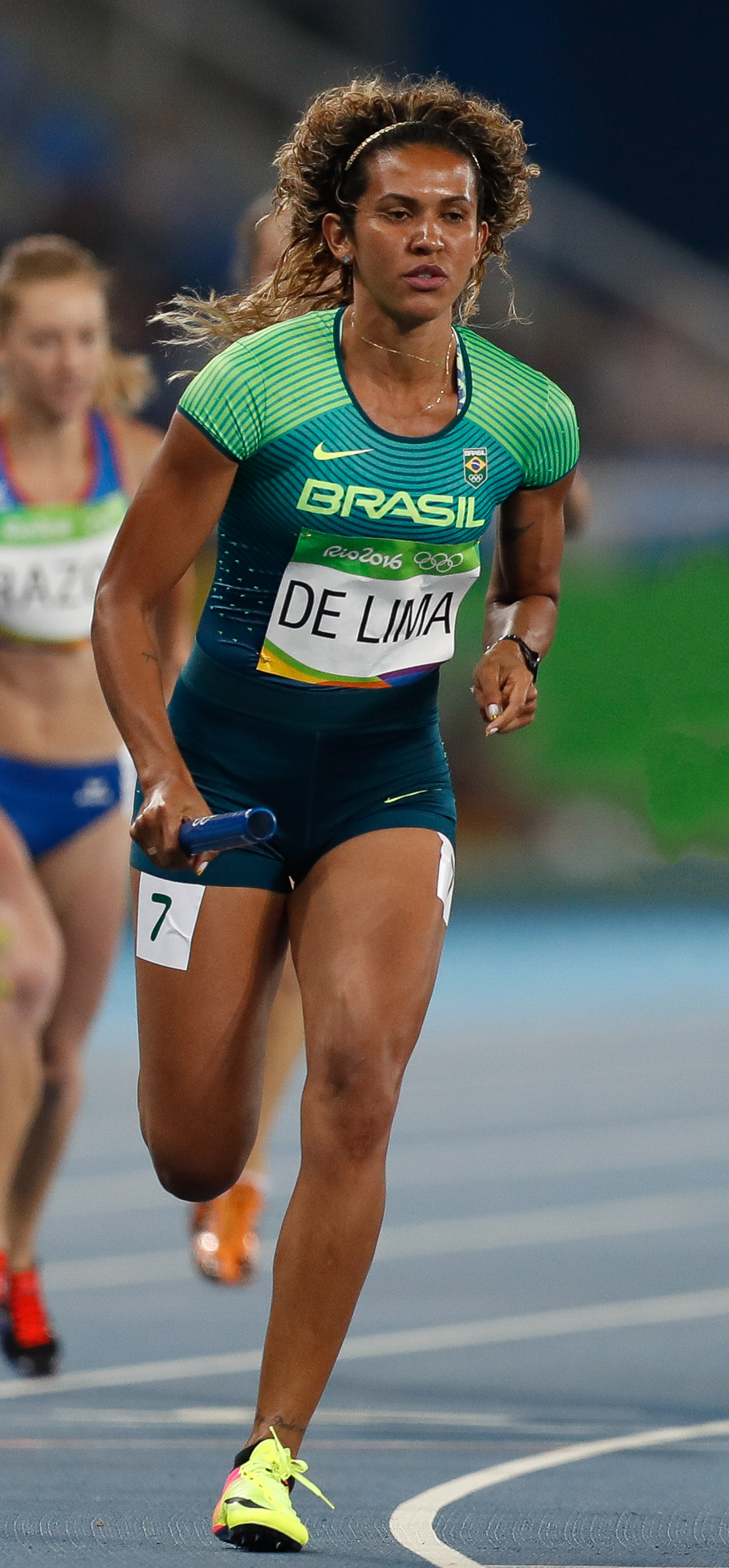
- De Lima at the 2016 Olympics

Personal information
- Full name: Jailma Sales de Lima
- Born: 31 December 1986 (age 39) Taperoá, Paraíba, Brazil
- Height: 1.73 m (5 ft 8 in)
- Weight: 60 kg (132 lb)

Sport
- Country: Brazil
- Sport: Athletics
Medal record
Women's athletics
Representing Brazil
Pan American Games
Silver medal – second place	2011 Guadalajara	4×400 m relay
Military World Games
Bronze medal – third place	2011 Rio de Janeiro	400 m
South American Youth Championships
Gold medal – first place	2002 Asunción	High jump
Gold medal – first place	2002 Asunción	Heptathlon
Silver medal – second place	2000 Bogotá	High jump
- Updated on 14 October 2015

Jailma Sales de Lima (born 31 December 1986) is a Brazilian track and field hurdler.

== Career ==
At the 2012 Summer Olympics, she competed in the Women's 400 metres hurdles and the 4 x 400 metre relay.

== Achievements ==
Year	Competition	Venue	Position	Event	Notes
Representing Brazil
2000	South American Youth Championships	Bogotá, Colombia	2nd	High jump	1.74 m A
2002	South American Youth Championships	Asunción, Paraguay	1st	High jump	1.72 m
2002	South American Youth Championships	Asunción, Paraguay	1st	Heptathlon	4679 pts
2006	South American U23 Championships / South American Games	Buenos Aires, Argentina	1st	Heptathlon	5304 pts
2006	South American U23 Championships / South American Games	Buenos Aires, Argentina	5th	4 × 400 m relay	3:46.29
2008	South American U23 Championships	Lima, Peru	1st	400m	54.46
2008	South American U23 Championships	Lima, Peru	1st	4 × 400 m relay	3:43.30
2015	South American Championships	Lima, Peru	4th	400m hurdles	58.58
2015	South American Championships	Lima, Peru	1st	4 × 400 m relay	3:34.51
2016	Olympic Games	Rio de Janeiro, Brazil	36th (h)	400 m	52.65
2016	Olympic Games	Rio de Janeiro, Brazil	16th (h)	4 × 400 m relay	3:30.27
2017	IAAF World Relays	Nassau, Bahamas	1st (B)	4 × 400 m relay	3:34.68
2017	South American Championships	Asunción, Paraguay	4th	400 m hurdles	57.98
2017	South American Championships	Asunción, Paraguay	1st	4 × 400 m relay	3:33.00
