= Segundo Jami =

Ecuadorian long-distance runner

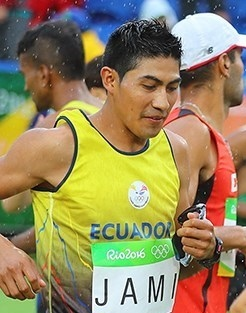
- Jami at the 2016 Olympics

Personal information
- Born: 12 May 1986 (age 40)
- Height: 165 cm (5 ft 5 in)
- Weight: 54 kg (119 lb)

Sport
- Sport: Athletics
- Event: Marathon
- Coached by: Jerónimo Bravo Rodríguez

Segundo Oswaldo Jami (born 12 May 1986) is a long-distance runner from Ecuador. He competed in the marathon at the 2016 Olympics.

Jami comes from a family of athletes – his uncles José and Nestor competed in the marathon at the 2001 World Championships. Jami took up athletics around the year 2000. He has degrees in commerce and engineering from the University of the Armed Forces, Latacunga, Ecuador. He is married to Elina Chariguaman and has three children, Axel, Kimberly and Sahara.

== Personal Bests ==
- 5000m - 14:35.47 (2022)
- 10000m - 29:43.4 (2022)
- Half Marathon - 1:02:28 (2022)
- Marathon - 2:09:05 (2023)
