= Rafael Ribeiro (athlete) =

Brazilian sprinter

Personal information
- Born: 23 June 1986 (age 40) Ourinhos, São Paulo, Brazil

Sport
- Sport: Track and field
Medal record
Representing Brazil
Pan American Games
Gold medal – first place	2007 Rio de Janeiro	4x100m relay

Rafael da Silva Ribeiro (born 23 June 1986) is a retired Brazilian sprinter. He won the gold medal in the 4 × 100 metres relay at the 2007 Pan American Games.
