= Ignacio Guerra =

Chilean javelin thrower

Ignacio
Personal information
- Nationality: Chile
- Born: 15 September 1987 (age 38) Santiago, Chile
- Height: 1.82 m (5 ft 11 1/2 in)
- Weight: 80 kg (176 lb)

Sport
- Sport: Athletics
- Event: Javelin throw
- College team: WKU
- Coached by: Esteban Sosa and Jarret Murphy
- Retired: 2015

Achievements and titles
- Olympic finals: Semifinalist at the 2008 Beijing Olympics
- World finals: Competed in two World Championships
- National finals: National Record (All categories)
- Highest world ranking: Ranked Number One in South America (2008), Number 9 in the World (May 2011), and was the best Ibero-American athlete at the 2008 Beijing Olympics.
- Personal bests: Javelin throw: 78.69 m (2011, FL, USA)
Medal record
Representing Chile
South American Games
Bronze medal – third place	2006 Buenos Aires	Javelin throw

Ignacio Guerra Martorell (born 15 September 1987) is a Chilean retired track and field athlete who competed in the javelin throw. He set both a national record and a personal best throw of 78.69 metres, by finishing first at Florida Relays and APSU Governors Invitational in Gainesville, Florida.

Guerra represented Chile at the 2008 Summer Olympics in Beijing, where he competed for the men's javelin throw. He performed a best throw of 73.03 metres from his third and final attempt, but fell short in his bid for the twelve-man final, as he placed twenty-fourth overall in the qualifying rounds.

Guerra is also a member of the track and field team for the WKU Hilltoppers, and also, a graduate of Marketing and Sales at the Western Kentucky University in Bowling Green, Kentucky.

Guerra retired from the javelin throw in 2015, after more than 20 years in the sport. He is currently Export Manager of Via Wines and Director of FreshWater.
