= Michele Cristina das Chagas =

Brazilian long-distance runner

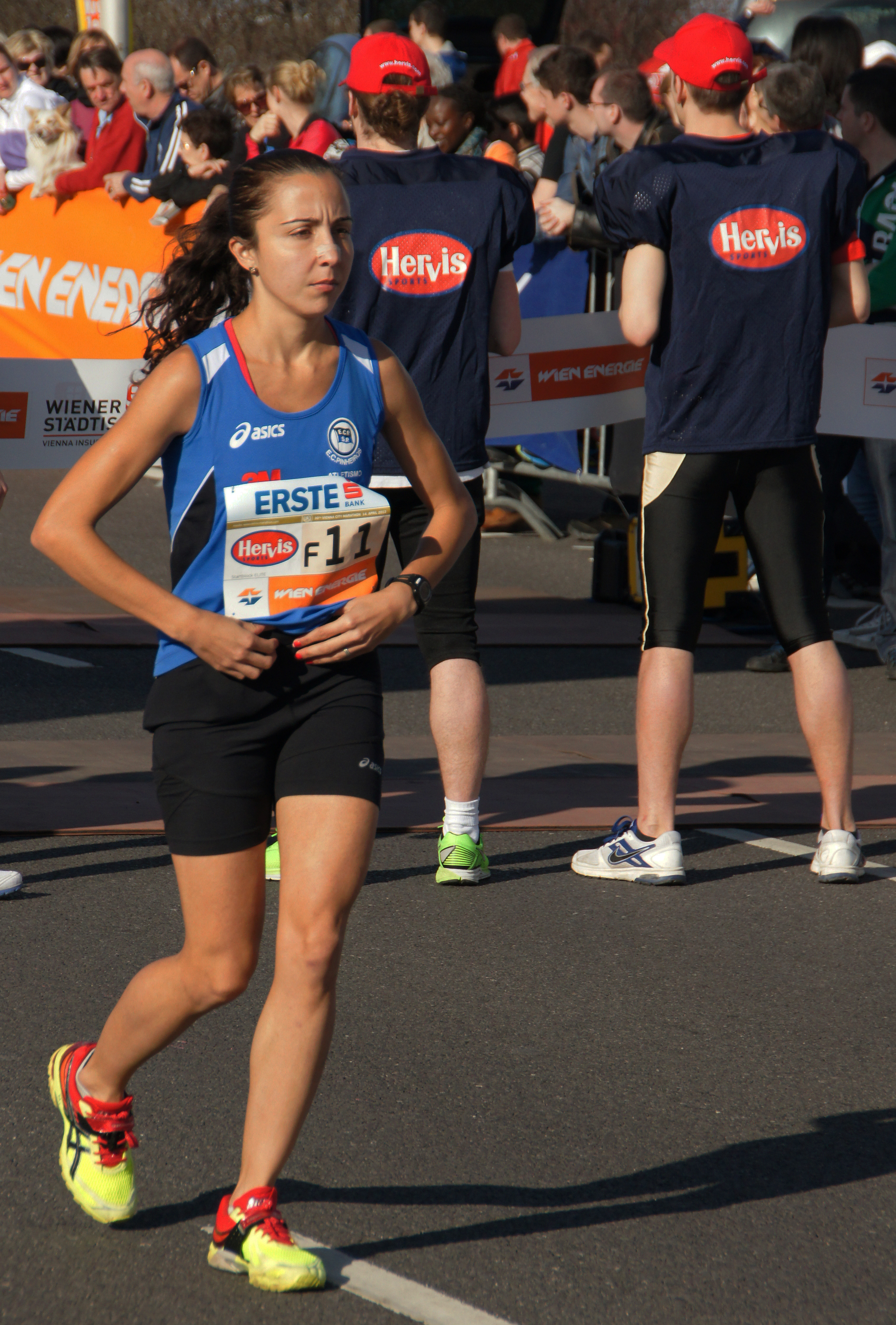
- Chagas in 2013

Personal information
- Born: 15 July 1987 (age 38)

Sport
- Country: Brazil
- Sport: Track and field
- Event: long-distance running
- Updated on 2 September 2015

Michele Cristina das Chagas (born 15 July 1987) is a Brazilian long-distance runner. She competed in the marathon event at the 2015 World Championships in Athletics in Beijing, China.

== See also ==
- Brazil at the 2015 World Championships in Athletics
