= 2015 South American Championships in Athletics – Results =

These are the full results of the 2015 South American Championships in Athletics which took place in Lima, Peru, from 12 to 14 June at the Estadio Atlético “La Videna”.

== Men's results ==
=== 100 meters ===
Heat 1 – 12 June 14:50h - Wind: -0.8 m/s

Rank	Name	Nationality	Time	Notes
1	Álex Quiñónez	Ecuador	10.61	Q
2	Isidro Montoya	Colombia	10.65	Q
3	Mateo Edward	Panama	10.70	q
4	Diego Rivas	Venezuela	10.80	
5	Ángel Ayala	Paraguay	10.96	
6	Enrique Polanco	Chile	11.04	

Heat 2 – 12 June 14:50h - Wind: -0.9 m/s

Rank	Name	Nationality	Time	Notes
1	Ifrish Alberg	Suriname	10.59	Q
2	Dubeiker Cedeño	Venezuela	10.73	Q
3	José Carlos Moreira	Brazil	10.76	
4	Cristián Leguizamón	Paraguay	10.78	
4	Arthur Bruno Rojas	Bolivia	10.78	
5	Andrés Rodríguez	Panama	11.00	
6	José Luis Mandros	Peru	11.22	

Heat 3 – 12 June 14:50h - Wind: -0.9 m/s

Rank	Name	Nationality	Time	Notes
1	Diego Palomeque	Colombia	10.63	Q
2	Gustavo Machado dos Santos	Brazil	10.70	Q
3	Danny Vanan	Suriname	10.73	q
4	Franco Boccardo	Chile	11.09	
5	Franklin Nazareno	Ecuador	11.13	
6	Luis Iriarte	Peru	11.32	

Final – 12 June 18:40h - Wind: -1.1 m/s

Rank	Name	Nationality	Time	Notes
1st place, gold medalist(s)	Diego Palomeque	Colombia	10.40	
2nd place, silver medalist(s)	Álex Quiñónez	Ecuador	10.43	
3rd place, bronze medalist(s)	Ifrish Alberg	Suriname	10.57	
4	Danny Vanan	Suriname	10.60	
5	Mateo Edward	Panama	10.62	
6	Gustavo Machado dos Santos	Brazil	10.68	
7	Dubeiker Cedeño	Venezuela	10.73	
8	Isidro Montoya	Colombia	12.86	

=== 200 meters ===
Heat 1 – 13 June 14:50h - Wind: -0.7 m/s

Rank	Name	Nationality	Time	Notes
1	Anderson Quintero	Ecuador	22.34	Q
2	Arthur Bruno Rojas	Bolivia	22.35	Q
3	Cristián Reyes	Chile	22.44	
4	Luis Iriarte	Peru	22.88	
	Aldemir da Silva Junior	Brazil	DNS	

Heat 2 – 13 June 14:50h - Wind: -2.0 m/s

Rank	Name	Nationality	Time	Notes
1	Diego Palomeque	Colombia	21.56	Q
2	Álvaro Cassiani	Venezuela	21.62	Q
3	Virgilio Griggs	Panama	21.77	q
4	John Zavala	Paraguay	22.47	
5	Jhonatan Grandez	Peru	22.74	

Heat 3 – 13 June 14:50h - Wind: -1.1 m/s

Rank	Name	Nationality	Time	Notes
1	Álex Quiñónez	Ecuador	21.23	Q
2	Arturo Deliser	Panama	21.33	Q
3	José Meléndez	Venezuela	21.37	q
4	Jurgen Themen	Suriname	22.11	
	Andrés Rodríguez	Panama	22.11	guest
5	Sergio Germaín	Chile	22.24	

Final – 14 June 11:15h - Wind: 0.0 m/s

Rank	Name	Nationality	Time	Notes
1st place, gold medalist(s)	Álex Quiñónez	Ecuador	20.76	
2nd place, silver medalist(s)	Diego Palomeque	Colombia	21.15	
3rd place, bronze medalist(s)	Arturo Deliser	Panama	21.25	
4	José Meléndez	Venezuela	21.29	
5	Álvaro Cassiani	Venezuela	21.42	
6	Virgilio Griggs	Panama	21.65	
7	Arthur Bruno Rojas	Bolivia	21.87	
	Anderson Quintero	Ecuador	DNS	

=== 400 meters ===
Heat 1 – 12 June 10:20h

Rank	Name	Nationality	Time	Notes
1	Alberth Bravo	Venezuela	47.60	Q
2	Carlos Lemos	Colombia	47.84	Q
3	Jonathan da Silva	Brazil	48.05	Q
4	Edmundo Díaz	Peru	48.36	
5	Luis Hassan	Panama	48.67	
6	Bryan Erazo	Peru	48.68	

Heat 2 – 12 June 10:20h

Rank	Name	Nationality	Time	Notes
1	Hederson Estefani	Brazil	46.17	Q
2	Freddy Mezones	Venezuela	46.48	Q
3	Sergio Germaín	Chile	47.56	Q
4	Joel Lynch	Panama	47.59	q
5	Martín Tagle	Chile	48.23	q
6	Fernando Copa	Bolivia	49.21	

Final – 12 June 18:10h

Rank	Name	Nationality	Time	Notes
1st place, gold medalist(s)	Alberth Bravo	Venezuela	45.26	
2nd place, silver medalist(s)	Hederson Estefani	Brazil	45.57	
3rd place, bronze medalist(s)	Freddy Mezones	Venezuela	45.67	
4	Carlos Lemos	Colombia	46.29	
5	Joel Lynch	Panama	46.64	
6	Sergio Germaín	Chile	46.87	
7	Martín Tagle	Chile	47.70	
8	Jonathan da Silva	Brazil	48.12	

=== 800 meters ===
Final – 14 June 10:00h

Rank	Name	Nationality	Time	Notes
1st place, gold medalist(s)	Rafith Rodríguez	Colombia	1:46.48	
2nd place, silver medalist(s)	Lucirio Antonio Garrido	Venezuela	1:47.83	
3rd place, bronze medalist(s)	Jhon Sinisterra	Colombia	1:48.50	
4	Javier Marmo	Uruguay	1:49.16	
5	Alejandro Peirano	Chile	1:49.27	
6	Williams García	Peru	1:49.35	
7	Aquiles Zúñiga	Chile	1:51.31	
8	Kevin Angulo	Ecuador	1:52.95	
9	Edmundo Díaz	Peru	1:57.79	
	Joseph Acevedo	Panama	DNF	
	Eduardo Gregorio	Uruguay	DNS	

=== 1500 meters ===
Final – 13 June 16:50h

Rank	Name	Nationality	Time	Notes
1st place, gold medalist(s)	Carlos Martín Díaz	Chile	3:40.79	
2nd place, silver medalist(s)	Federico Bruno	Argentina	3:42.21	
3rd place, bronze medalist(s)	Gerard Giraldo	Colombia	3:42.38	
4	Freddy Espinosa	Colombia	3:43.19	
5	Javier Carriqueo	Argentina	3:46.31	
6	Kevin Angulo	Ecuador	3:46.72	
7	Javier Marmo	Uruguay	3:47.59	
8	Jean Carlos Machado	Brazil	3:50.46	
9	Ariel Méndez	Chile	3:52.67	
10	Walter Nina	Peru	3:56.90	
11	Eduardo Gregorio	Uruguay	4:02.27	
12	Joseph Acevedo	Panama	4:02.74	

=== 5000 meters ===
Final – 12 June 17:00h

Rank	Name	Nationality	Time	Notes
1st place, gold medalist(s)	Víctor Aravena	Chile	14:06.14	
2nd place, silver medalist(s)	Federico Bruno	Argentina	14:06.25	
3rd place, bronze medalist(s)	Byron Piedra	Ecuador	14:08.84	
4	José Luis Rojas	Peru	14:11.27	
5	Mauricio González	Colombia	14:11.73	
6	David Benedito de Macedo	Brazil	14:12.67	
7	Matías Silva	Chile	14:12.85	
8	Daniel Toroya	Bolivia	14:18.52	
9	Iván Darío González	Colombia	14:20.04	
10	Wily Canchanya	Peru	14:48.00	
11	César Paul Pilaluisa	Ecuador	14:49.57	
	Javier Carriqueo	Argentina	DNF	
	Pablo Gardiol	Uruguay	DNF	

=== 10,000 meters ===
Final – 14 June 9:00h

Rank	Name	Nationality	Time	Notes
1st place, gold medalist(s)	Byron Piedra	Ecuador	28:30.80	
2nd place, silver medalist(s)	Mauricio González	Colombia	28:33.53	
3rd place, bronze medalist(s)	Luis Ostos	Peru	28:43.10	
4	Javier Guarín	Colombia	28:46.69	
5	David Benedito de Macedo	Brazil	29:28.92	
6	Yerson Orellana	Peru	29:36.13	
7	Leslie Encina	Chile	30:12.56	
8	Roberto Echeverría	Chile	30:36.69	
9	Nicolás Cuestas	Uruguay	30:36.92	
10	César Paul Pilaluisa	Ecuador	30:51.69	
11	Martín Cuestas	Uruguay	32:36.40	
	Daniel Toroya	Bolivia	DNF	
	Derlis Ayala	Paraguay	DNS	
	Giovani dos Santos	Brazil	DNS	

=== 110 meters hurdles ===
Heat 1 – 12 June 11:10h - Wind: 0.6 m/s

Rank	Name	Nationality	Time	Notes
1	Eder Antonio Souza	Brazil	13.90	Q
2	Javier McFarlane	Peru	14.19	Q
3	Jeyson Rivas	Colombia	14.36	Q
4	Diego Delmónaco	Chile	14.59	q
5	Víctor Arancibia	Chile	14.72	q

Heat 2 – 12 June 11:10h - Wind: -1.1 m/s

Rank	Name	Nationality	Time	Notes
1	João Vitor de Oliveira	Brazil	13.92	Q
2	Jorge McFarlane	Peru	14.13	Q
3	Agustín Carrera	Argentina	14.19	Q
4	Williams Ríos	Panama	14.84	
	Cristián Alzate	Colombia	DNF	

Final – 12 June 16:20h - Wind: -1.2 m/s

Rank	Name	Nationality	Time	Notes
1st place, gold medalist(s)	João Vitor de Oliveira	Brazil	13.96	
2nd place, silver medalist(s)	Jorge McFarlane	Peru	13.99	
3rd place, bronze medalist(s)	Javier McFarlane	Peru	14.00	
4	Eder Antonio Souza	Brazil	14.07	
5	Jeyson Rivas	Colombia	14.21	
6	Agustín Carrera	Argentina	14.54	
7	Diego Delmónaco	Chile	14.63	
8	Víctor Arancibia	Chile	15.07	

=== 400 meters hurdles ===
Final – 13 June 15:50h

Rank	Name	Nationality	Time	Notes
1st place, gold medalist(s)	Andrés Silva	Uruguay	49.43	
2nd place, silver medalist(s)	Hederson Estefani	Brazil	49.54	
3rd place, bronze medalist(s)	Víctor Solarte	Venezuela	50.83	
4	Jeyson Rivas	Colombia	50.88	
5	Yeferson Valencia	Colombia	51.45	
6	Lucirio Francisco Garrido	Venezuela	51.88	
7	Emersón Chalá	Ecuador	52.51	
8	Nickols Yarmas	Peru	54.37	

=== 3000 meters steeplechase ===
Final – 14 June 12:10h

Rank	Name	Nationality	Time	Notes
1st place, gold medalist(s)	Gerard Giraldo	Colombia	8:29.53	
2nd place, silver medalist(s)	Mauricio Valdivia	Chile	8:40.28	
3rd place, bronze medalist(s)	Enzo Yáñez	Chile	8:43.28	
4	Camilo Camargo	Colombia	8:47.20	
5	Jean Carlos Machado	Brazil	8:53.37	
6	Mario Bazán	Peru	8:54.27	
7	Joaquín Arbe	Argentina	9:00.35	
8	Walter Nina	Peru	9:00.73	
9	Marvin Blanco	Venezuela	9:12.03	

=== High jump ===
Final – 12 June 15:00h

Rank	Name	Nationality	Attempts									Result	Notes
Rank	Name	Nationality	1.95	2.00	2.05	2.10	2.13	2.16	2.19	2.22	2.25	Result	Notes
1st place, gold medalist(s)	Fernando Ferreira	Brazil	-	-	-	xo	o	o	xo	xo	xxx	2.22	
2nd place, silver medalist(s)	Talles Frederico Silva	Brazil	-	-	-	o	-	xxo	xxo	xxo	xxx	2.22	
3rd place, bronze medalist(s)	Alexander Bowen	Panama	-	-	xo	o	xx-	--	xo	xx		2.19	
4	Eure Yánez	Venezuela	-	-	-	o	o	-	xx			2.13	
5	Arturo Chávez	Peru	-	-	o	xo	-	xx				2.10	
6	Carlos Layoy	Argentina	-	-	o	x	xx					2.05	
7	Daniel Cortés	Colombia	-	xo	o	xx						2.05	
8	Henry Edmond	Panama	-	xxo	xo	xxx						2.05	
9	Jan Westreicher	Peru	xo	x-	xx							1.95	
	Diego Ferrín	Ecuador	-	-	xx							NH	

=== Long jump ===
Final – 13 June 16:00h

Rank	Name	Nationality	Attempts						Result	Notes
Rank	Name	Nationality	1	2	3	4	5	6	Result	Notes
1st place, gold medalist(s)	Emiliano Lasa	Uruguay	7.71 w (+2.1)	7.96 (+1.7)	x	8.09 (+1.9)	x	x	8.09 (1.9 m/s	
2nd place, silver medalist(s)	Diego Hernández	Venezuela	7.62 (+1.4)	x	7.26 w (+2.3)	7.47 (+1.6)	7.61 w (+2.1)	7.91 w (+2.2)	7.91 w (2.2 m/s	
3rd place, bronze medalist(s)	Mauro Vinícius da Silva	Brazil	7.81 (+2.0)	x	7.38 (+1.5)	x	7.70 w (+2.2)	7.66 w (+2.2)	7.81 (2.0 m/s	
4	Jorge McFarlane	Peru	7.49 (+1.9)	7.58 (+1.4)	7.60 w (+2.5)	7.51 (+1.9)	x	7.57 (+1.5)	7.60 w (2.5 m/s	
5	Daniel Pineda	Chile	7.49 (+0.7)	7.52 w (+2.4)	7.43 (+0.9)	7.46 w (+2.4)	x	7.52 w (+3.2)	7.52 w (2.4 m/s	
6	Álvaro Cortez	Chile	7.17 w (+2.3)	7.44 w (+2.3)	7.35 w (+2.4)	x	7.24 (+1.6)	x	7.44 w (2.3 m/s	
7	Juan Mosquera	Panama	7.27 (+1.8)	7.42 w (+2.7)	7.39 (+0.7)	7.30 w (+2.7)	7.02 w (+3.1)	x	7.42 w (2.7 m/s	
8	Quincy Breell	Aruba	6.95 w (+2.1)	x	7.30 w (+2.4)	7.22 w (+2.1)	7.24 (+1.5)	7.11 (+1.9)	7.30 w (2.4 m/s	

=== Triple jump ===
Final – 14 June 11:30h

Rank	Name	Nationality	Attempts						Result	Notes
Rank	Name	Nationality	1	2	3	4	5	6	Result	Notes
1st place, gold medalist(s)	Jhon Murillo	Colombia	16.33 (+0.3)	16.55 (+1.6)	16.42 (+0.4)	16.44 (+0.7)	-	x	16.55 (1.6 m/s	
2nd place, silver medalist(s)	Jefferson Sabino	Brazil	16.34 (+1.7)	x	16.17 (+0.9)	15.84 (-0.1)	16.07 (+0.4)	16.20 (+0.0)	16.34 (1.7 m/s	
3rd place, bronze medalist(s)	Divier Murillo	Colombia	15.49 (+0.9)	16.00 (+1.3)	16.34 (+0.0)	15.89 (+0.8)	x	-	16.34 (0.0 m/s	
4	Álvaro Cortez	Chile	15.64 (+0.6)	15.73 (+0.0)	16.00 (+0.9)	15.96 (-0.3)	15.71 (+0.1)	15.48 (+1.0)	16.00 (0.9 m/s	
5	Jean Cassimiro Rosa	Brazil	15.56 (+0.1)	x	-	-	-	-	15.56 (0.1 m/s	
6	Maximiliano Díaz	Argentina	15.19 (+1.2)	x	15.11 (+0.0)	x	14.80 (+0.6)	15.36 (+0.5)	15.36 (0.5 m/s	
7	Roy Martínez	Venezuela	x	15.22 (+0.2)	15.24 (+0.8)	x	15.19 (+0.0)	15.07 (+0.0)	15.24 (0.8 m/s	
8	Hugo Chila	Ecuador	15.02 (+1.1)	x	13.11 (+0.8)	-	-	-	15.02 (1.1 m/s	

=== Pole vault ===
Final – 12 June 10:00h

Rank	Name	Nationality	Attempts									Result	Notes
Rank	Name	Nationality	4.60	4.70	4.80	5.00	5.20	5.30	5.50	5.70	5.80	Result	Notes
1st place, gold medalist(s)	Germán Chiaraviglio	Argentina	-	-	-	-	-	xo	o	xo	xxx	5.70	
2nd place, silver medalist(s)	Daniel Zupeuc	Chile	o	-	o	xxo	xxx					5.00	
3rd place, bronze medalist(s)	José Gutiérrez	Peru	o	xxo	xxx							4.70	
4	Javier León	Peru	xo	xxx								4.60	
	Felipe Fuentes	Chile	xxx									NH	
	José Rodolfo Pacho	Ecuador	-	-	-	xxx						NH	
	Augusto Dutra da Silva de Oliveira	Brazil	-	-	-	-	-	-	xx			NH	

=== Shot put ===
Final – 13 June 10:00h

Rank	Name	Nationality	Attempts						Result	Notes
Rank	Name	Nationality	1	2	3	4	5	6	Result	Notes
1st place, gold medalist(s)	Germán Lauro	Argentina	19.90	20.51	x	x	20.77	20.33	20.77	
2nd place, silver medalist(s)	Darlan Romani	Brazil	x	x	18.73	19.29	19.19	20.32	20.32	
3rd place, bronze medalist(s)	Nelson Henrique Fernandes	Brazil	16.87	17.05	18.04	x	17.21	18.28	18.28	
4	Josnner Ortiz	Venezuela	15.80	16.75	x	x	16.82	17.38	17.38	
5	Aldo González	Bolivia	x	16.78	17.22	16.94	x	16.88	17.22	
6	Matías López	Chile	16.79	15.95	16.61	15.52	x	x	16.79	
7	Maximiliano Alonso	Chile	16.50	16.65	16.21	16.78	16.49	16.66	16.78	
8	Santiago Espín	Ecuador	15.76	15.90	16.49	15.66	15.94	16.33	16.49	
9	Jesús Enrique Parejo	Venezuela	15.51	x	15.00				15.51	

=== Discus throw ===
Final – 12 June 10:00h

Rank	Name	Nationality	Attempts						Result	Notes
Rank	Name	Nationality	1	2	3	4	5	6	Result	Notes
1st place, gold medalist(s)	Mauricio Ortega	Colombia	57.54	59.68	61.18	61.36	60.48	60.45	61.36	
2nd place, silver medalist(s)	Ronald Julião	Brazil	55.41	57.09	x	58.26	59.80	59.24	59.80	
3rd place, bronze medalist(s)	Juan Caicedo	Ecuador	52.57	54.88	x	x	53.44	x	54.88	
4	Jesús Enrique Parejo	Venezuela	52.70	54.04	51.60	53.52	54.26	50.33	54.26	
5	Maximiliano Alonso	Chile	x	x	52.20	x	50.26	x	52.20	
6	Eduardo Quintero	Ecuador	48.80	x	x	49.89	x	43.72	49.89	
7	Stefano Paz	Peru	x	41.36	x	40.26	x	x	41.36	

=== Javelin throw ===
Final – 12 June 15:00h

Rank	Name	Nationality	Attempts						Result	Notes
Rank	Name	Nationality	1	2	3	4	5	6	Result	Notes
1st place, gold medalist(s)	Júlio César de Oliveira	Brazil	77.06	77.40	79.25	79.57	78.41	81.22	81.22	
2nd place, silver medalist(s)	Braian Toledo	Argentina	75.16	79.34	x	75.12	x	77.58	79.34	
3rd place, bronze medalist(s)	Arley Ibargüen	Colombia	70.87	75.47	x	-	-	-	75.47	
4	Jaime Dayron Márquez	Colombia	72.38	x	x	72.93	70.74	74.10	74.10	
5	Larson Díaz	Paraguay	x	67.99	x	68.60	70.52	67.51	70.52	
6	Víctor Fatecha	Paraguay	66.95	68.00	67.49	x	68.14	68.72	68.72	
7	José Orlando Escobar	Ecuador	61.83	66.49	66.77	x	64.19	64.22	66.77	
8	Santiago de la Fuente	Chile	56.02	60.17	x	x	60.23	64.84	64.84	

=== Hammer throw ===
Final – 14 June 9:00h

Rank	Name	Nationality	Attempts						Result	Notes
Rank	Name	Nationality	1	2	3	4	5	6	Result	Notes
1st place, gold medalist(s)	Wagner Domingos	Brazil	x	71.47	70.18	x	70.14	70.57	71.47	
2nd place, silver medalist(s)	Allan Wolski	Brazil	68.66	67.84	68.14	69.13	69.82	68.53	69.82	
3rd place, bronze medalist(s)	Juan Cerra	Argentina	x	66.07	65.61	x	67.70	67.23	67.70	
4	Humberto Mansilla	Chile	x	66.66	x	65.51	66.06	66.83	66.83	
5	Elias Mauricio Díaz	Colombia	x	64.83	x	62.41	x	x	64.83	
6	Roberto Sáez	Chile	62.83	61.56	56.92	60.36	61.15	64.06	64.06	
7	Alexander Quailey	Venezuela	59.62	57.52	61.48	x	56.69	58.62	61.48	
8	Joseph Melgar	Peru	54.32	58.89	57.42	56.72	x	58.71	58.89	

=== 20,000 meters walk ===
Final – 12 June 7:30h

Rank	Name	Nationality	Time	Notes
1st place, gold medalist(s)	Pavel Chihuán	Peru	1:23:34.00	
2nd place, silver medalist(s)	Juan Manuel Cano	Argentina	1:23:56.00	
3rd place, bronze medalist(s)	Mauricio Arteaga	Ecuador	1:24:18.00	
	Brian Pintado	Ecuador	1:25:25.00	guest
4	Paolo Yurivilca	Peru	1:26:27.00	
	Yerko Araya	Chile	DQ	
	Iván Garrido	Colombia	DQ	
	Richard Vargas	Venezuela	DNF	
	Rolando Saquipay	Ecuador	DNF	
	José Leonardo Montaña	Colombia	DNF	

=== 4x100 meters relay ===
Final – 13 June 18:40h

Rank	Nation	Competitors	Time	Notes
1st place, gold medalist(s)	Ecuador	Anderson Quintero; Jhon Valencia; Franklin Nazareno; Álex Quiñónez	39.94	
2nd place, silver medalist(s)	Venezuela	Diego Rivas; Arturo Ramírez; Álvaro Cassiani; Dubeiker Cedeño	40.19	
3rd place, bronze medalist(s)	Colombia	Yeferson Valencia; Diego Palomeque; Jeyson Rivas; Carlos Lemos	40.80	
4	Paraguay	John Zavala; Fredy Maidana; Cristián Leguizamón; Ángel Ayala	41.26	
5	Peru	Daniel Caballero; Jhonatan Grandez; Frank Sánchez; José Luis Mandros	41.88	
	Chile	Sebastián Valdivia; Enzo Faulbaum; Enrique Polanco; Franco Boccardo	DNF	

=== 4x400 meters relay ===
Final – 14 June 13:00h

Rank	Nation	Competitors	Time	Notes
1st place, gold medalist(s)	Venezuela	Alberth Bravo; José Meléndez lberto Aguilar; Freddy Mezones	3:04.96	
2nd place, silver medalist(s)	Chile	Martín Tagle; Sergio Aldea; Sergio Germaín; Enzo Faulbaum	3:10.32	
3rd place, bronze medalist(s)	Peru	Bryan Erazo; Williams García; Luis Saavedra; Paulo Herrera	3:14.64	

=== Decathlon ===
Final – 13 June 18:00h

The highest mark recorded in each event is highlighted in yellow

Rank	Name	Nationality	100m	LJ	SP	HJ	400m	110m H	DT	PV	JT	1500m	Points	Notes
1st place, gold medalist(s)	Luiz Alberto de Araújo	Brazil	11.03 (-1.4); 854pts	6.99 (-1.3); 811pts	14.94; 786pts	1.94; 749pts	49.63; 832pts	14.44; 918pts	44.76; 762pts	4.80; 849pts	52.01; 618pts	4:49.82; 620pts	7799	
2nd place, silver medalist(s)	Georni Jaramillo	Venezuela	11.05 (-1.4); 850pts	7.38 (1.0); 905pts	14.30; 747pts	1.88; 696pts	50.70; 783pts	14.43; 920pts	42.09; 707pts	4.20; 673pts	55.31; 668pts	5:09.81; 505pts	7454	
3rd place, bronze medalist(s)	Óscar Campos	Venezuela	11.26 (-1.4); 804pts	6.61 (-2.5); 723pts	12.45; 634pts	1.70; 544pts	51.19; 761pts	15.46; 795pts	42.26; 711pts	4.30; 702pts	50.78; 600pts	4:55.97; 583pts	6857	

== Women's results ==
=== 100 meters ===
Heat 1 – 12 June 16:45h - Wind: -1.1 m/s

Rank	Name	Nationality	Time	Notes
1	Isidora Jiménez	Chile	11.52	Q
2	Marizol Landázuri	Ecuador	11.73	Q
3	Yuliana Angulo	Ecuador	11.88	Q
4	Lexabeth Hidalgo	Venezuela	12.04	
5	María Victoria Woodward	Argentina	12.08	
6	Danielle Clark	Suriname	12.39	
7	Gabriela Delgado	Peru	12.58	

Heat 2 – 12 June 14:30h - Wind: -1.7 m/s

Rank	Name	Nationality	Time	Notes
1	Nediam Vargas	Venezuela	11.57	Q
2	Vanusa dos Santos	Brazil	11.60	Q
3	Vitória Cristina Rosa	Brazil	11.71	Q
4	Eliecit Palacios	Colombia	11.81	q
5	Sunayna Wahi	Suriname	12.01	q
	Yasmin Woodruff	Panama	12.04	guest
6	Ruth-Cassandra Hunt	Panama	12.17	
7	Josefina Gutiérrez	Chile	12.28	

Final – 12 June 18:50h - Wind: -1.0 m/s

Rank	Name	Nationality	Time	Notes
1st place, gold medalist(s)	Nediam Vargas	Venezuela	11.45	
2nd place, silver medalist(s)	Isidora Jiménez	Chile	11.51	
3rd place, bronze medalist(s)	Vanusa dos Santos	Brazil	11.60	
4	Vitória Cristina Rosa	Brazil	11.66	
5	Eliecit Palacios	Colombia	11.71	
6	Sunayna Wahi	Suriname	11.78	
7	Marizol Landázuri	Ecuador	11.96	
	Yuliana Angulo	Ecuador	FS	

=== 200 meters ===
Heat 1 – 13 June 14:30h - Wind: -1.4 m/s

Rank	Name	Nationality	Time	Notes
1	Nediam Vargas	Venezuela	24.21	Q
2	Geisa Coutinho	Brazil	24.62	Q
3	Sunayna Wahi	Suriname	24.67	Q
	Yasmin Woodruff	Panama	24.71	guest
4	Ruth-Cassandra Hunt	Panama	24.93	
5	Gabriela Delgado	Peru	25.67	
	Paula Goñi	Chile	DNS	

Heat 2 – 13 June 14:30h - Wind: -1.3 m/s

Rank	Name	Nationality	Time	Notes
1	Nercelis Soto	Venezuela	23.80	Q
2	Isidora Jiménez	Chile	23.91	Q
3	Vitória Cristina Rosa	Brazil	24.27	Q
4	Yvette Lewis	Panama	24.64	q
5	Danielle Clark	Suriname	24.83	q
6	Yenifer Padilla	Colombia	25.27	
7	Jimena Copara	Peru	25.61	

Final – 14 June 11:00h - Wind: -0.9 m/s

Rank	Name	Nationality	Time	Notes
1st place, gold medalist(s)	Nercelis Soto	Venezuela	23.15	
2nd place, silver medalist(s)	Isidora Jiménez	Chile	23.38	
3rd place, bronze medalist(s)	Nediam Vargas	Venezuela	23.60	
4	Vitória Cristina Rosa	Brazil	23.66	
5	Sunayna Wahi	Suriname	24.02	
6	Danielle Clark	Suriname	24.71	
	Geisa Coutinho	Brazil	DNS	
	Yvette Lewis	Panama	DNS	

=== 400 meters ===
Heat 1 – 12 June 10:00h

Rank	Name	Nationality	Time	Notes
1	Geisa Coutinho	Brazil	53.81	Q
2	Liliane Fernandes	Brazil	54.84	Q
3	Maitte Torres	Peru	55.33	Q
4	Paula Goñi	Chile	55.58	q
5	Maryury Valdez	Venezuela	57.06	

Heat 2 – 12 June 10:00h

Rank	Name	Nationality	Time	Notes
1	Nercelis Soto	Venezuela	54.99	Q
2	María Fernanda Mackenna	Chile	55.13	Q
3	Yenifer Padilla	Colombia	55.39	Q
4	Jimena Copara	Peru	55.43	q

Final – 12 June 18:00h

Rank	Name	Nationality	Time	Notes
1st place, gold medalist(s)	Geisa Coutinho	Brazil	53.07	
2nd place, silver medalist(s)	Nercelis Soto	Venezuela	54.38	
3rd place, bronze medalist(s)	Liliane Fernandes	Brazil	54.53	
4	María Fernanda Mackenna	Chile	54.96	
5	Maitte Torres	Peru	55.22	
6	Paula Goñi	Chile	55.36	
7	Jimena Copara	Peru	55.52	
8	Yenifer Padilla	Colombia	55.56	

=== 800 meters ===
Final – 14 June 9:50h

Rank	Name	Nationality	Time	Notes
1st place, gold medalist(s)	Déborah Rodríguez	Uruguay	2:01.46	
2nd place, silver medalist(s)	Flávia de Lima	Brazil	2:02.05	
3rd place, bronze medalist(s)	Ydanis Navas	Venezuela	2:07.92	
4	Lorena Sosa	Uruguay	2:09.05	
5	Mariana Borelli	Argentina	2:09.72	
6	Andrea Ferris	Panama	2:10.98	
7	María Hortensia Caballero	Paraguay	2:11.23	
8	Soledad Torre	Peru	2:12.50	
9	Eliona Delgado	Peru	2:13.56	

=== 1500 meters ===
Final – 12 June 15:30h

Rank	Name	Nationality	Time	Notes
1st place, gold medalist(s)	Muriel Coneo	Colombia	4:10.14	CR
2nd place, silver medalist(s)	Flávia de Lima	Brazil	4:13.58	
3rd place, bronze medalist(s)	María Pía Fernández	Uruguay	4:19.37	
4	María Osorio	Venezuela	4:27.42	
5	María Hortensia Caballero	Paraguay	4:29.74	
6	Eliona Delgado	Peru	4:32.60	
7	Soledad Torre	Peru	4:34.77	

=== 5000 meters ===
Final – 14 June 10:15h

Rank	Name	Nationality	Time	Notes
1st place, gold medalist(s)	María Pastuña	Ecuador	15:49.33	
2nd place, silver medalist(s)	Tatiele Roberta de Carvalho	Brazil	15:50.62	
3rd place, bronze medalist(s)	Carolina Tabares	Colombia	15:59.28	
4	Nadia Rodríguez	Argentina	16:37.33	
5	Giselle Álvarez	Chile	16:43.79	
	María Paredes	Ecuador	16:45.39	guest
6	Jéssica Paguay	Ecuador	16:54.16	
7	Karina Villazana	Peru	16:57.88	
8	Mirena Goncalvez	Venezuela	17:02.60	
9	Irma Vila	Bolivia	17:03.30	
10	Gabriela Alfonso	Venezuela	17:10.41	
	Wilma Arizapana	Peru	DNS	
	Érika Olivera	Chile	DNS	

=== 10,000 meters ===
Final – 12 June 19:15h

Rank	Name	Nationality	Time	Notes
1st place, gold medalist(s)	Inés Melchor	Peru	32:28.87	
2nd place, silver medalist(s)	María Pastuña	Ecuador	32:51.33	
3rd place, bronze medalist(s)	Wilma Arizapana	Peru	33:01.15	
4	Carolina Tabares	Colombia	33:12.72	
5	Rosa Godoy	Argentina	33:24.71	
6	Angie Orjuela	Colombia	33:30.13	
7	Carmen Patrícia Martínez	Paraguay	34:37.75	
	María Paredes	Ecuador	34:57.88	guest
8	Jéssica Paguay	Ecuador	35:07.78	
9	Giselle Álvarez	Chile	35:27.13	
10	Érika Olivera	Chile	36:14.96	
11	Mirena Goncalvez	Venezuela	37:08.70	
	Gabriela Alfonso	Venezuela	DNF	
	Tatiele Roberta de Carvalho	Brazil	DNF	

=== 100 meters hurdles ===
Final – 12 June 16:40h - Wind: -2.2 m/s

Rank	Name	Nationality	Time	Notes
1st place, gold medalist(s)	Yvette Lewis	Panama	13.31	
2nd place, silver medalist(s)	Briggite Merlano	Colombia	13.43	
3rd place, bronze medalist(s)	Adelly Santos	Brazil	13.53	
4	Génesis Romero	Venezuela	13.85	
5	Diana Bazalar	Peru	13.91	
6	María Ignacia Eguiguren	Chile	14.21	
7	Maribel Vanesa Caicedo	Ecuador	14.58	
8	Romina Montes	Peru	15.37	

=== 400 meters hurdles ===
Final – 13 June 15:30h

Rank	Name	Nationality	Time	Notes
1st place, gold medalist(s)	Déborah Rodríguez	Uruguay	56.33	
2nd place, silver medalist(s)	Magdalena Mendoza	Venezuela	56.65	
3rd place, bronze medalist(s)	Liliane Fernandes	Brazil	58.44	
4	Jailma de Lima	Brazil	58.58	
5	Yadira Moreno	Colombia	59.72	
6	Javiera Errázuriz	Chile	61.37	
7	Maitte Torres	Peru	61.47	
8	Claudia Meneses	Peru	62.75	

=== 3000 meters steeplechase ===
Final – 14 June 11:50h

Rank	Name	Nationality	Time	Notes
1st place, gold medalist(s)	Muriel Coneo	Colombia	9:53.1	
2nd place, silver medalist(s)	Tatiane Raquel da Silva	Brazil	9:56.8	
3rd place, bronze medalist(s)	Belén Casetta	Argentina	9:57.1	
4	Ángela Figueroa	Colombia	10:01.3	
5	Jovana de la Cruz	Peru	10:14.9	
6	María Osorio	Venezuela	10:56.3	
	Cinthya Páucar	Peru	DNF	

=== High jump ===
Final – 14 June 10:45h

Rank	Name	Nationality	Attempts								Result	Notes
Rank	Name	Nationality	1.60	1.65	1.70	1.73	1.76	1.79	1.82	1.85	Result	Notes
1st place, gold medalist(s)	Ana Paula de Oliveira	Brazil	–	–	–	o	xo	o	o	xxx	1.82	
2nd place, silver medalist(s)	Candy Toche	Peru	–	xo	o	o	o	xxx			1.76	
3rd place, bronze medalist(s)	Betsabé Páez	Argentina	–	–	xo	o	xo	xxx			1.76	
4	Nulfa Palacios	Colombia	o	o	o	xxo	xxx				1.73	
5	Lorena Aires	Uruguay	–	o	xo	xxo	xxx				1.73	

=== Long jump ===
Final – 13 June 11:15h

Rank	Name	Nationality	Attempts						Result	Notes
Rank	Name	Nationality	1	2	3	4	5	6	Result	Notes
1st place, gold medalist(s)	Paola Mautino	Peru	6.24 (-2.0)	6.29 (-2.9)	6.52 w (+3.2)	6.48 (+1.3)	6.36 (+1.9)	x	6.52 w (3.2 m/s	
2nd place, silver medalist(s)	Tânia da Silva	Brazil	6.03 (+0.1)	6.10 (+2.0)	6.23 w (+2.6)	6.26 w (+2.5)	6.02 (+1.7)	6.37 w (+2.9)	6.37 w (2.9 m/s	
3rd place, bronze medalist(s)	Yuliana Angulo	Ecuador	5.98 (+1.9)	x	6.00 w (+2.7)	3.85 (-1.7)	x	6.25 (+1.9)	6.25 (1.9 m/s	
4	Yulimar Rojas	Venezuela	6.20 w (+2.4)	6.04 w (+2.9)	5.95 w (11)	4.71 (+2.0)	6.16 w (+2.8)	5.84 (+1.6)	6.20 w (2.4 m/s	
5	Macarena Reyes	Chile	6.01 w (+2.7)	6.10 (+2.0)	x	x	6.08 (+1.7)	6.15 (+1.6)	6.15 (1.6 m/s	
6	Génesis Romero	Venezuela	5.72 (+1.8)	5.93 (+2.0)	5.57 w (+2.3)	5.67 (+1.4)	5.77 (+1.4)	5.66 (+1.5)	5.93 (2.0 m/s	
7	Adriana Chila	Ecuador	5.58 (-1.7)	5.67 (+1.3)	5.70 (+1.0)	5.58 (+2.0)	5.45 (+1.5)	5.53 w (+2.4)	5.70 (1.0 m/s	
8	Nairobi de la Torre	Peru	x	4.28 (+1.4)	5.63 (+2.0)	x	x	x	5.63 (2.0 m/s	
9	Nathaly Aranda	Panama	5.33 w (+2.5)	5.29 (+1.4)	5.25 (+1.7)				5.33 w (2.5 m/s	

=== Triple jump ===
Final – 12 June 16:30h

Rank	Name	Nationality	Attempts						Result	Notes
Rank	Name	Nationality	1	2	3	4	5	6	Result	Notes
1st place, gold medalist(s)	Yulimar Rojas	Venezuela	13.51 (+1.1)	13.56 (+2.0)	13.88 (+1.8)	13.97 w (+2.4)	14.05 (+1.9)	14.14 w (+2.8)	14.14 w (2.8 m/s	
2nd place, silver medalist(s)	Tânia da Silva	Brazil	13.56 (-1.0)	13.60 (+1.9)	-	13.56 (+1.1)	13.44 (+1.6)	-	13.60 (1.9 m/s	
3rd place, bronze medalist(s)	Giselly Landázury	Colombia	12.96 (+0.9)	13.23 (+1.3)	x	13.35 (+1.3)	x	13.24 (+1.8)	13.35 (1.3 m/s	
4	Mirian Reyes	Peru	13.02 (+1.3)	13.01 (+1.2)	x	x	x	x	13.02 (1.3 m/s	
5	Adriana Chila	Ecuador	12.43 (+1.3)	12.59 (+0.2)	12.76 (+1.4)	12.58 w (+2.1)	11.65 (+0.3)	x	12.76 (1.4 m/s	
6	Valeria Quispe	Bolivia	12.56 (+0.6)	x	x	x	x	x	12.56 (0.6 m/s	

=== Pole vault ===
Final – 13 June 14:30h

Rank	Name	Nationality	Attempts											Result	Notes
Rank	Name	Nationality	3.40	3.50	3.60	3.70	3.80	3.90	4.00	4.10	4.20	4.35	4.50	Result	Notes
1st place, gold medalist(s)	Robeilys Peinado	Venezuela	-	-	-	-	-	-	-	o	o	xo	xxx	4.35	
2nd place, silver medalist(s)	Valeria Chiaraviglio	Argentina	-	-	-	-	-	xo	o	o	xxx			4.10	
3rd place, bronze medalist(s)	Karla Rosa da Silva	Brazil	-	-	-	-	-	-	xxo	xo	xx			4.10	
4	Victoria Fernández	Chile	xo	-	o	xo	xx							3.70	
5	Jéssica Fu	Peru	-	xo	o	xx								3.60	

=== Shot put ===
Final – 14 June 9:30h

Rank	Name	Nationality	Attempts						Result	Notes
Rank	Name	Nationality	1	2	3	4	5	6	Result	Notes
1st place, gold medalist(s)	Geisa Arcanjo	Brazil	17.24	17.76	17.39	17.50	17.35	x	17.76	
2nd place, silver medalist(s)	Natalia Ducó	Chile	17.05	17.17	x	17.14	17.15	17.56	17.56	
3rd place, bronze medalist(s)	Ahymará Espinoza	Venezuela	16.30	17.15	17.25	17.07	x	x	17.25	
4	Sandra Lemos	Colombia	15.98	16.55	17.01	16.28	16.62	x	17.01	
5	Ivanna Gallardo	Chile	15.86	16.62	x	x	x	x	16.62	
6	Anyela Rivas	Colombia	15.97	16.15	16.24	16.02	x	16.04	16.24	
7	Grace Conley	Bolivia	13.74	x	13.36	13.88	13.08	13.76	13.88	
8	Rosa Rodríguez	Venezuela	11.92	13.66	-	-	-	-	13.66	

=== Discus throw ===
Final – 13 June 14:30h

Rank	Name	Nationality	Attempts						Result	Notes
Rank	Name	Nationality	1	2	3	4	5	6	Result	Notes
1st place, gold medalist(s)	Andressa de Morais	Brazil	x	59.82	x	56.78	61.15	58.74	61.15	
2nd place, silver medalist(s)	Fernanda Borges Martins	Brazil	56.79	x	x	58.22	56.17	x	58.22	
3rd place, bronze medalist(s)	Rocío Comba	Argentina	55.21	x	56.33	57.15	56.90	x	57.15	
4	Karen Gallardo	Chile	55.12	56.90	55.03	56.72	x	54.42	56.90	
5	Ivanna Gallardo	Chile	50.86	x	53.43	x	x	x	53.43	
6	Aixa Middleton	Panama	x	x	x	48.19	x	50.70	50.70	
7	Elizabeth Álvarez	Venezuela	45.05	45.92	47.92	48.60	48.82	x	48.82	

=== Javelin throw ===
Final – 14 June 11:40h

Rank	Name	Nationality	Attempts						Result	Notes
Rank	Name	Nationality	1	2	3	4	5	6	Result	Notes
1st place, gold medalist(s)	Jucilene de Lima	Brazil	56.73	57.23	60.16	56.80	58.51	x	60.16	
2nd place, silver medalist(s)	Flor Ruiz	Colombia	56.55	54.00	55.20	59.38	59.86	56.87	59.86	
3rd place, bronze medalist(s)	María Paz Ríos	Chile	49.79	x	50.61	51.12	x	x	51.12	
4	Laura Paredes	Paraguay	50.80	45.58	48.80	49.91	48.78	49.76	50.80	
5	Estefanny Chacón	Venezuela	x	47.57	50.32	x	49.46	48.43	50.32	
6	Denisse Vargas	Ecuador	44.11	x	48.04	46.08	46.72	47.38	48.04	
7	Nadia Requeña	Peru	46.22	46.49	46.56	x	44.07	43.51	46.56	

=== Hammer throw ===
Final – 13 June 11:20h

Rank	Name	Nationality	Attempts						Result	Notes
Rank	Name	Nationality	1	2	3	4	5	6	Result	Notes
1st place, gold medalist(s)	Rosa Rodríguez	Venezuela	x	x	70.19	71.66	61.23	69.72	71.66	
2nd place, silver medalist(s)	Eli Johana Moreno	Colombia	x	65.60	65.68	65.27	66.05	x	66.05	
3rd place, bronze medalist(s)	Jennifer Dahlgren	Argentina	63.35	x	64.76	x	64.65	x	64.76	
4	Carla Michel	Brazil	57.64	62.28	60.42	x	61.16	63.24	63.24	
5	Valeria Chuiliquinga	Ecuador	55.07	55.90	60.91	61.30	57.77	x	61.30	
6	Zuleima Mina	Ecuador	59.00	57.78	57.55	59.10	59.43	59.52	59.52	
7	Marcela Solano	Chile	58.95	57.45	59.06	58.62	58.39	58.28	59.06	
8	Eudelia Enríquez	Peru	54.32	55.11	53.88	50.93	53.87	53.09	55.11	
9	Ana María Vásquez	Peru	x	46.44	49.37				49.37	

=== 20,000 meters walk ===
Final – 13 June 7:00h

Rank	Name	Nationality	Time	Notes
1st place, gold medalist(s)	Sandra Arenas	Colombia	1:31:02.25	NR
2nd place, silver medalist(s)	Ingrid Hernández	Colombia	1:36:42.1	
3rd place, bronze medalist(s)	Ángela Castro	Bolivia	1:41:38.3	
4	Gisselle Rodríguez	Panama	1:54:07.9	
	Érica de Sena	Brazil	DQ	
	Kimberly García	Peru	DQ	
	Jessica Hancco	Peru	DQ	

=== 4x100 meters relay ===
Final – 13 June 18:20h

Rank	Nation	Competitors	Time	Notes
1st place, gold medalist(s)	Venezuela	Lexabeth Hidalgo; Magdalena Mendoza; Nediam Vargas; Nercelis Soto	44.28	
2nd place, silver medalist(s)	Brazil	Vanusa dos Santos; Bruna Farias; Vitória Cristina Rosa; Adelly Santos	44.43	
3rd place, bronze medalist(s)	Chile	Josefina Gutiérrez; Isidora Jiménez; María Fernanda Mackenna; Paula Goñi	44.83	
4	Ecuador	Yuliana Angulo; Marizol Landázuri; Viviana de la Cruz; Kenya Quiñónez	45.33	
5	Peru	Diana Bazalar; Maitte Torres; Paola Mautino; Gabriela Delgado	46.71	

=== 4x400 meters relay ===
Final – 14 June 12:50h

Rank	Nation	Competitors	Time	Notes
1st place, gold medalist(s)	Brazil	Vanusa dos Santos; Liliane Fernandes; Joelma Sousa; Jailma de Lima	3:34.51	
2nd place, silver medalist(s)	Venezuela	Nercelis Soto; Magdalena Mendoza; Maryury Valdez; Ydanis Navas	3:37.05	
3rd place, bronze medalist(s)	Chile	Paula Goñi; Carmen Mansilla; Javiera Errázuriz; María Fernanda Mackenna	3:40.56	
4	Argentina	María Ayelén Diogo; Valeria Baron; Juliana Menéndez; Noelia Martínez	3:41.01	
5	Peru	Deysi Parra; Claudia Meneses; Jimena Copara; Maitte Torres	3:44.44	

=== Heptathlon ===
Final – 14 June 11:30h

The highest mark recorded in each event is highlighted in yellow

Rank	Name	Nationality	100m H	HJ	SP	200m	LJ	JT	800m	Points	Notes
1st place, gold medalist(s)	Evelis Aguilar	Colombia	14.55 (-1.3); 902pts	1.64; 783pts	12.65; 704pts	24.13 (0); 968pts	6.21 (0.0); 915pts	40.63; 679pts	2:10.94; 951pts	5902	NR, CR
2nd place, silver medalist(s)	Guillercy Gonzales	Venezuela	14.92 (-1.3); 852pts	1.70; 855pts	13.23; 743pts	26.18 (0); 781pts	5.70 (0.6); 759pts	43.24; 730pts	2:27.53; 724pts	5444	
3rd place, bronze medalist(s)	Giovana Aparecida Cavaleti	Brazil	14.41 (-1.3); 921pts	1.67; 818pts	12.20; 674pts	24.91 (0); 895pts	5.80 (0.0); 789pts	32.78; 529pts	2:21.73; 800pts	5426	
4	Agustina Zerboni	Argentina	14.20 (-1.3); 950pts	1.55; 678pts	13.15; 737pts	25.71 (0); 823pts	5.45 (0.0); 686pts	40.59; 679pts	2:18.64; 842pts	5395	
5	Ana Camila Pirelli	Paraguay	14.20 (-1.3); 950pts	1.58; 712pts	12.90; 721pts	25.50 (0); 841pts	5.00 (0.0); 559pts	44.64; 757pts	2:20.04; 823pts	5363	
6	Javiera Brahm	Chile	14.78 (-1.3); 871pts	1.55; 678pts	10.50; 562pts	25.60 (0); 833pts	5.32 (0.0); 648pts	26.13; 404pts	2:25.39; 752pts	4748	
7	Weinie Castillo	Ecuador	14.54 (-1.3); 903pts	1.55; 678pts	10.80; 582pts	26.03 (0); 795pts	5.15 (0.0); 601pts	29.72; 471pts	2:41.15; 560pts	4590	
8	Ana Laura Leite	Uruguay	15.69 (-1.3); 753pts	1.43; 544pts	9.91; 524pts	26.71 (0); 736pts	5.23 (0.0); 623pts	31.66; 508pts	2:27.65; 723pts	4411	
9	Carolina Castillo	Chile	14.95 (-1.3); 848pts	1.52; 644pts	10.52; 564pts	26.64 (0); 742pts	5.13 (0.0); 595pts			3393	
10	Melissa Arana	Peru	15.81 (-1.3); 738pts	1.58; 712pts	9.92; 524pts					1974	
