= 2019 South American Championships in Athletics – Results =

These are the full results of the 2019 South American Championships in Athletics which took place in Lima, Peru, from 24 to 26 May at the Villa Deportiva Nacional.

== Men's results ==
=== 100 meters ===
Heats – 24 May
Wind:
Heat 1: +0.3 m/s, Heat 2: -0.1 m/s

Rank	Heat	Name	Nationality	Time	Notes
1	1	Rodrigo do Nascimento	Brazil	10.31	Q
2	2	Felipe Bardi dos Santos	Brazil	10.39	Q
3	2	Diego Palomeque	Colombia	10.39	Q
4	2	Emanuel Archibald	Guyana	10.50	Q
5	1	Jhonny Rentería	Colombia	10.58	Q
6	1	Enrique Polanco	Chile	10.59	q
6	2	Christopher Ortiz	Paraguay	10.59	Q
8	1	Akeem Stewart	Guyana	10.61	q
9	1	Fredy Maidana	Paraguay	10.68	
10	2	Mateo Edward	Panama	10.70	
11	1	Otilio Rosa	Argentina	10.74	
12	1	Bruno Rojas	Bolivia	10.75	
12	2	Abdel Kalil	Venezuela	10.75	
13	1	Alexander Marquinez	Ecuador	10.99	
14	2	Steeven Salas	Ecuador	11.00	
15	2	Pablo Roberto Abán	Bolivia	11.04	

Final – 24 May
Wind:
-0.9 m/s

Rank	Lane	Name	Nationality	Time	Notes
1st place, gold medalist(s)	4	Rodrigo do Nascimento	Brazil	10.28	
2nd place, silver medalist(s)	5	Felipe Bardi dos Santos	Brazil	10.43	
3rd place, bronze medalist(s)	3	Diego Palomeque	Colombia	10.47	
4	2	Jhonny Rentería	Colombia	10.56	
5	6	Emanuel Archibald	Guyana	10.56	
6	1	Christopher Ortiz	Paraguay	10.58	
7	8	Akeem Stewart	Guyana	10.68	
8	7	Enrique Polanco	Chile	10.70	

=== 200 meters ===
Heats – 25 May
Wind:
Heat 1: -0.6 m/s, Heat 2: -0.3 m/s

Rank	Heat	Name	Nationality	Time	Notes
1	1	Bernardo Baloyes	Colombia	20.68	Q
2	1	Rodrigo do Nascimento	Brazil	20.89	Q
3	2	Winston George	Guyana	21.15	Q
4	1	Christopher Ortiz	Paraguay	21.23	Q
5	2	Erik Cardoso	Brazil	21.39	Q
6	1	Enzo Faulbaum	Chile	21.51	q
7	2	Fredy Maidana	Paraguay	21.53	Q
8	1	Virjilio Griggs	Panama	21.55	q
9	2	Otilio Rosa	Argentina	21.58	
10	2	Alexander Marquinez	Ecuador	21.75	
11	1	Bruno Rojas	Bolivia	21.76	
12	1	Akeem Stewart	Guyana	21.79	
13	2	Rodrigo Opazo	Chile	21.92	
14	2	Mateo Edward	Panama	21.93	
15	2	Jeffrey Vanan	Suriname	22.09	
16	1	Rafael Vázquez	Venezuela	22.67	

Final – 26 May
Wind:
-0.7 m/s

Rank	Lane	Name	Nationality	Time	Notes
1st place, gold medalist(s)	4	Bernardo Baloyes	Colombia	20.42	CR
2nd place, silver medalist(s)	5	Rodrigo do Nascimento	Brazil	20.63	
3rd place, bronze medalist(s)	6	Christopher Ortiz	Paraguay	20.98	
4	3	Winston George	Guyana	20.99	
5	2	Erik Cardoso	Brazil	21.20	
6	1	Fredy Maidana	Paraguay	21.32	
7	7	Enzo Faulbaum	Chile	21.46	
8	8	Virjilio Griggs	Panama	21.51	

=== 400 meters ===
24 May

Rank	Lane	Name	Nationality	Time	Notes
1st place, gold medalist(s)	4	Anthony Zambrano	Colombia	45.53	
2nd place, silver medalist(s)	3	Lucas Carvalho	Brazil	46.12	
3rd place, bronze medalist(s)	5	Anderson Henriques	Brazil	46.15	
4	6	Kelvis Padrino	Venezuela	46.72	
5	2	Yilmar Herrera	Colombia	47.34	
6	7	Winston George	Guyana	47.66	
7	1	Carlos Perlaza	Ecuador	49.19	
8	8	Tito Hinojosa	Bolivia	50.26	

=== 800 meters ===
26 May

Rank	Name	Nationality	Time	Notes
1st place, gold medalist(s)	Lucirio Antonio Garrido	Venezuela	1:46.27	
2nd place, silver medalist(s)	Jelssin Robledo	Colombia	1:47.31	
3rd place, bronze medalist(s)	Marco Vilca	Peru	1:48.06	
4	Alejandro Peirano	Chile	1:48.36	
5	Guilherme Orenhas	Brazil	1:48.69	
6	Miguel Ángel Mesa	Colombia	1:48.97	
7	Diego Lacamoire	Argentina	1:49.77	
8	Marco Salcedo	Ecuador	1:50.30	
9	Guilherme Kurtz	Brazil	1:50.40	
10	Devaun Barrington	Guyana	1:51.80	
11	Chamal Chambers	Panama	1:51.82	
12	Carlos Arellano	Ecuador	1:56.83	
13	Rafael Muñoz	Chile	1:57.97	
14	David Galeano	Paraguay	2:01.42	

=== 1500 meters ===
24 May

Rank	Name	Nationality	Time	Notes
1st place, gold medalist(s)	Lucirio Antonio Garrido	Venezuela	3:55.04	
2nd place, silver medalist(s)	Diego Lacamoire	Argentina	3:55.15	
3rd place, bronze medalist(s)	Carlos de Oliveira Santos	Brazil	3:55.18	
4	Santiago Catrofe	Uruguay	3:55.21	
5	Carlos Hernández	Colombia	3:56.49	
6	Carlos San Martín	Colombia	3:56.84	
7	Fabián Manrique	Argentina	3:56.91	
8	Marco Salcedo	Ecuador	3:57.14	
9	Cleber Cisneros	Peru	3:58.33	
10	Juan Ignacio Peña	Chile	3:58.87	
11	Mario Bazán	Peru	4:00.06	
12	Carlos Arellano	Ecuador	4:03.84	

=== 5000 meters ===
26 May

Rank	Name	Nationality	Time	Notes
1st place, gold medalist(s)	Altobeli da Silva	Brazil	13:50.08	CR
2nd place, silver medalist(s)	José Luis Rojas	Peru	13:53.11	
3rd place, bronze medalist(s)	Gerard Giraldo	Colombia	13:54.51	
4	Vidal Basco	Bolivia	13:57.80	NR
5	Iván Darío González	Colombia	13:59.31	
6	Jesús Manuel Yana	Peru	14:07.97	
7	Ederson Pereira	Brazil	14:12.00	
8	Ronal Cuestas	Uruguay	14:18.67	
9	Rafael Loza	Ecuador	14:24.44	
10	Hector Garibay	Bolivia	14:24.68	
11	Fabián Manrique	Argentina	14:58.27	
12	Bernardo Maldonado	Argentina	15:11.13	
	Bayron Piedra	Ecuador	DNS	

=== 10,000 meters ===
24 May

Rank	Name	Nationality	Time	Notes
1st place, gold medalist(s)	Bayron Piedra	Ecuador	28:48.13	
2nd place, silver medalist(s)	José Mauricio González	Colombia	28:48.60	
3rd place, bronze medalist(s)	Vidal Basco	Bolivia	28:52.32	NR
4	Jhon Cusi	Peru	28:53.39	
5	Nicolás Herrera	Colombia	28:53.55	
6	Luis Fernando Ostos	Peru	29:24.37	
7	Ronal Cuestas	Uruguay	29:41.71	
8	Rubén Arando	Bolivia	30:19.71	
9	Matías Silva	Chile	31:05.97	
	Ederson Pereira	Brazil	DNF	
	Bernardo Maldonado	Argentina	DNF	

=== 110 meters hurdles ===
24 May
Wind: -0.8 m/s

Rank	Lane	Name	Nationality	Time	Notes
1st place, gold medalist(s)	4	Gabriel Constantino	Brazil	13.54	
2nd place, silver medalist(s)	6	Yohan Chaverra	Colombia	13.66	
3rd place, bronze medalist(s)	5	Eduardo de Deus	Brazil	13.68	
4	3	Fanor Escobar	Colombia	14.12	
5	2	Agustín Carrera	Argentina	14.15	
6	1	Javier McFarlane	Peru	14.44	
7	8	Mauricio Sandoval	Bolivia	15.04	
	7	Mauricio Garrido	Peru	DQ	

=== 400 meters hurdles ===
25 May

Rank	Lane	Name	Nationality	Time	Notes
1st place, gold medalist(s)	4	Alison dos Santos	Brazil	49.88	
2nd place, silver medalist(s)	5	Alfredo Sepúlveda	Chile	50.03	
3rd place, bronze medalist(s)	1	Guillermo Ruggeri	Argentina	50.20	
4	7	Andrés Silva	Uruguay	50.73	
5	3	Mahau Suguimati	Brazil	51.15	
6	8	Paulo Herrera	Peru	52.86	
7	2	Kevin Mina	Colombia	52.97	
	6	Fanor Escobar	Colombia	DNS	

=== 3000 meters steeplechase ===
25 May

Rank	Name	Nationality	Time	Notes
1st place, gold medalist(s)	Carlos San Martín	Colombia	8:36.37	
2nd place, silver medalist(s)	Altobeli da Silva	Brazil	8:38.43	
3rd place, bronze medalist(s)	Gerard Giraldo	Colombia	8:41.48	
4	Mario Bazán	Peru	8:44.48	
5	Diego Arevalo	Ecuador	8:49.42	
6	José Peña	Venezuela	8:57.95	
7	Victor Aguilar	Bolivia	9:00.54	
8	Fausto Alonso	Argentina	9:02.91	
9	Jesús Yana	Peru	9:04.25	
10	Jean Manuel Pérez	Bolivia	9:06.71	
11	Roberto Tello	Chile	9:16.07	
12	Joaquín Arbe	Argentina	9:19.06	
	Israel Mecabo	Brazil	DNF	

=== 4 × 100 meters relay ===
25 May

Rank	Lane	Nation	Competitors	Time	Notes
1st place, gold medalist(s)	6	Venezuela	Alberto Aguilar, Abdel Kalil, Alexis Nieves, Rafael Vázquez	39.56	
2nd place, silver medalist(s)	3	Brazil	Erik Cardoso, Gabriel Constantino, Rodrigo do Nascimento, Eduardo de Deus	39.91	
3rd place, bronze medalist(s)	2	Colombia	Jhonny Rentería, Diego Palomeque, Yilmar Herrera, Bernardo Baloyes	39.94	
4	7	Chile	Javier Pinilla, Enzo Faulbaum, Rodrigo Opazo, Enrique Polanco	40.32	
5	4	Peru	Andy Martínez, Frank Sánchez, Frank Iriarte, Mauricio Garrido	40.97	
6	5	Ecuador	Jhon Valencia, Alexander Marquinez, Carlos Perlaza, Steeven Salas	41.14	
7	1	Bolivia	Carlos Abán, Pablo Abán, Tito Hinojosa, Bruno Rojas	41.73	

=== 4 × 400 meters relay ===
26 May

Rank	Nation	Competitors	Time	Notes
1st place, gold medalist(s)	Colombia	Jhon Mosquera, Diego Palomeque, Kevin Mina, Anthony Zambrano	3:04.04	
2nd place, silver medalist(s)	Brazil	Lucas Carvalho, Alison dos Santos, Mahau Suguimati, Anderson Henriques	3:04.13	
3rd place, bronze medalist(s)	Chile	Enzo Faulbaum, Rafael Muñoz, Alejandro Peirano, Alfredo Sepúlveda	3:11.84	
4	Peru	Christhoper Curto, Fabrizio Vizcarra, Mauricio Garrido, Paulo Herrera	3:14.28	

=== 20,000 meters walk ===
26 May

Rank	Name	Nationality	Time	Notes
1st place, gold medalist(s)	Jhon Castañeda	Colombia	1:22:33.4	
2nd place, silver medalist(s)	David Hurtado	Ecuador	1:23:39.7	
3rd place, bronze medalist(s)	Luis Henry Campos	Peru	1:24:17.5	
4	Juan Manuel Cano	Argentina	1:26:19.9	
	Éider Arévalo	Colombia	DNF	
	Yerko Araya	Chile	DNF	
	Pablo Rodríguez	Bolivia	DQ	
	César Rodríguez	Peru	DQ	

=== High jump ===
24 May

Rank	Name	Nationality	1.90	1.95	2.00	2.05	2.10	2.15	2.18	2.21	2.24	Result	Notes
1st place, gold medalist(s)	Alexander Bowen	Panama	–	–	–	o	o	o	o	o	xxx	2.21	
2nd place, silver medalist(s)	Fernando Ferreira	Brazil	–	–	–	o	o	o	o	xo	xxx	2.21	
3rd place, bronze medalist(s)	Eure Yáñez	Venezuela	–	–	–	o	o	xo	o	xx–	x	2.18	
4	Carlos Layoy	Argentina	–	–	–	o	o	xxx				2.10	
4	Thiago Moura	Brazil	–	–	o	o	o	xxx				2.10	
6	Arturo Chávez	Peru	–	–	–	o	xo	xxx				2.10	
	Juan José Camacho	Peru	xxx									NM	
	Yohan Chaverra	Colombia	–	xxx								NM	
	Gilmar Correa	Colombia										DNS	

=== Pole vault ===
24 May

Rank	Name	Nationality	4.61	4.81	5.01	5.21	5.31	5.41	5.51	5.56	5.61	5.71	Result	Notes
1st place, gold medalist(s)	Augusto Dutra de Oliveira	Brazil	–	–	–	–	–	o	o	–	xo	xxx	5.61	
2nd place, silver medalist(s)	Thiago Braz	Brazil	–	–	–	–	–	xo	xx–	x			5.41	
3rd place, bronze medalist(s)	Germán Chiaraviglio	Argentina	–	–	–	o	–	xxx					5.21	
4	José Pacho	Ecuador	–	–	–	xo	xxx						5.21	
5	Dyander Pacho	Ecuador	–	–	o	xxx							5.01	
6	Ignacio Sánchez	Peru	o	xxo	xxx								4.81	
	Pablo Chaverra	Colombia	–	–	xxx								NM	
	Walter Viáfara	Colombia											DNS	

=== Long jump ===
25 May

Rank	Name	Nationality	#1	#2	#3	#4	#5	#6	Result	Notes
1st place, gold medalist(s)	Emiliano Lasa	Uruguay	7.74	7.74	7.76	–	–	–	7.76	
2nd place, silver medalist(s)	Paulo Sérgio Oliveira	Brazil	7.66	7.68	x	7.71	x	x	7.71	
3rd place, bronze medalist(s)	Raúl Mena	Colombia	6.88	7.19	7.45	7.54	7.37	7.66	7.66	
4	Emanuel Archibald	Guyana	6.16	7.39	7.44	x	x	7.66	7.66	
5	José Luis Mandros	Peru	6.85	x	6.75	7.39	7.30	7.41	7.41	
6	Daniel Pineda	Chile	6.84	7.18	7.29	x	–	–	7.29	
7	Erick Suárez	Bolivia	7.17	x	7.19	6.87	7.04	6.90	7.19	
8	Guillermo Herrera	Peru	6.84	6.96	6.76	7.07	6.95	6.67	7.07	
9	José Villarroel	Bolivia	x	6.80	x				6.80	
	Arnovis Dalmero	Colombia							DNS	

=== Triple jump ===
26 May

Rank	Name	Nationality	#1	#2	#3	#4	#5	#6	Result	Notes
1st place, gold medalist(s)	Maximiliano Díaz	Argentina	x	16.07	16.00	16.23	–	x	16.23	
2nd place, silver medalist(s)	Kauam Bento	Brazil	16.18	15.36	x	13.82	14.95	x	16.18	
3rd place, bronze medalist(s)	Miguel van Assen	Suriname	16.11	x	–	–	14.58	16.01	16.11	
4	Arnovis Dalmero	Colombia	15.86	15.74	15.41	13.28	x	15.58	15.86	
5	Frixon Chila	Ecuador	14.93	15.55	15.63	15.42	x	13.84	15.63	
	Geiner Moreno	Colombia							DNS	

=== Shot put ===
25 May

Rank	Name	Nationality	#1	#2	#3	#4	#5	#6	Result	Notes
1st place, gold medalist(s)	Darlan Romani	Brazil	21.00	20.89	20.35	20.12	20.39	20.24	21.00	
2nd place, silver medalist(s)	Willian Dourado	Brazil	18.60	18.48	18.25	18.48	18.74	19.09	19.09	
3rd place, bronze medalist(s)	Germán Lauro	Argentina	x	x	17.79	18.97	18.77	18.85	18.97	
4	Juan Ignacio Carballo	Argentina	17.54	18.31	17.05	x	18.26	17.57	18.31	
5	Rodrigo Cardenas	Chile	x	15.50	14.96	15.16	15.68	15.52	15.68	

=== Discus throw ===
25 May

Rank	Name	Nationality	#1	#2	#3	#4	#5	#6	Result	Notes
1st place, gold medalist(s)	Mauricio Ortega	Colombia	56.61	58.89	x	58.40	x	x	58.89	
2nd place, silver medalist(s)	Douglas dos Reis	Brazil	x	x	55.87	55.31	55.29	56.43	56.43	
3rd place, bronze medalist(s)	Claudio Romero	Chile	46.76	x	x	53.24	54.31	x	54.31	
4	Wellinton da Cruz	Brazil	51.17	48.99	53.35	51.57	50.56	49.54	53.35	
5	Juan José Caicedo	Ecuador	50.05	52.34	52.26	x	52.89	52.88	52.89	
6	Rodrigo Cárdenas	Chile	46.28	x	49.79	50.05	51.75	x	51.75	
7	Stefano Paz	Peru	x	x	45.24	x	x	44.30	45.24	

=== Hammer throw ===
26 May

Rank	Name	Nationality	#1	#2	#3	#4	#5	#6	Result	Notes
1st place, gold medalist(s)	Gabriel Kehr	Chile	74.56	75.27	72.54	x	x	73.55	75.27	CR
2nd place, silver medalist(s)	Humberto Mansilla	Chile	70.95	73.00	x	69.88	72.64	x	73.00	
3rd place, bronze medalist(s)	Allan Wolski	Brazil	69.40	71.63	72.51	72.22	69.35	x	72.51	
4	Joaquín Gómez	Argentina	67.22	69.77	65.92	66.61	69.75	71.47	71.47	
5	Wagner Domingos	Brazil	69.08	x	68.90	x	69.85	69.66	69.85	
6	Daniel Aguirre	Colombia	62.47	61.73	59.72	x	62.30	59.16	62.47	
7	Joseph Melgar	Peru	60.57	58.36	57.63	59.98	57.94	58.40	60.57	
8	Manuel Terán	Bolivia	48.29	x	46.83	42.55	46.95	44.82	48.29	

=== Javelin throw ===
25 May

Rank	Name	Nationality	#1	#2	#3	#4	#5	#6	Result	Notes
1st place, gold medalist(s)	Dayron Márquez	Colombia	72.96	78.00	77.39	76.97	x	–	78.00	
2nd place, silver medalist(s)	Francisco Muse	Chile	68.89	71.64	73.24	69.74	75.97	75.33	75.97	
3rd place, bronze medalist(s)	Arley Ibargüen	Colombia	75.83	75.66	75.78	73.62	74.77	x	75.83	
4	Leslain Baird	Guyana	56.74	74.43	x	66.36	71.18	67.98	74.43	
5	José Escobar	Ecuador	63.87	67.06	66.92	63.22	65.67	63.51	67.06	
6	Jean Mairongo	Ecuador	65.80	66.25	64.10	x	62.93	64.75	66.25	
7	Giovanni Díaz	Paraguay	x	60.06	61.48	62.93	x	64.75	64.75	
8	Jonathan Cedeño	Panama	50.75	60.21	62.17	62.07	61.13	63.39	63.39	
9	Lautaro Techera	Uruguay	59.77	59.45	59.70				59.77	
10	Melbin Soto	Bolivia	52.50	59.75	58.32				59.75	
	Braian Toledo	Argentina							DNS	

=== Decathlon ===
24–25 May

The highest mark recorded in each event is highlighted in yellow

Rank	Athlete	Nationality	100m	LJ	SP	HJ	400m	110m H	DT	PV	JT	1500m	Points	Notes
1st place, gold medalist(s)	Georni Jaramillo	Venezuela	10.84	7.41	15.97	1.83	49.43	14.15	40.75	4.40	58.40	5:01.52	7784	
2nd place, silver medalist(s)	Gerson Izaguirre	Venezuela	11.13	7.24	12.78	1.95	50.39	14.76	38.69	4.40	49.79	5:00.43	7302	
3rd place, bronze medalist(s)	Sergio Pandiani	Argentina	11.08	6.67	12.94	1.83	50.62	14.87	38.74	4.00	55.17	4:28.00	7226	
4	Lucas Catanhede	Brazil	11.08	6.98	11.50	1.92	50.05	14.92	36.08	4.00	46.84	4:21.01	7179	
	Andy Preciado	Ecuador	11.47	6.81	14.80	2.04	55.87	15.54	45.25	NM	DNS	–	DNF	
	Luiz Alberto de Araújo	Brazil	11.07	6.87	14.89	1.86	50.26	DNF	DNS	–	–	–	DNF	
	Alejandro Lucumí	Colombia	11.29	7.06	13.37	NM	DNS	–	–	–	–	–	DNF	
	José Lemos	Colombia	DNS	–	–	–	–	–	–	–	–	–	DNS	

== Women's results ==
=== 100 meters ===
Heats – 24 May
Wind:
Heat 1: -0.1 m/s, Heat 2: -0.1 m/s

Rank	Heat	Name	Nationality	Time	Notes
1	1	Vitória Cristina Rosa	Brazil	11.30	Q
2	2	Andrea Purica	Venezuela	11.35	Q
3	1	Gabriela Suárez	Ecuador	11.58	Q
4	1	Isidora Jiménez	Chile	11.61	Q
5	1	María Victoria Woodward	Argentina	11.65	q
6	2	Andressa Fidelis	Brazil	11.66	Q
7	2	Yasmin Woodruff	Panama	11.80	Q
8	2	Eliecith Palacios	Colombia	11.93	q
9	2	Florencia Lamboglia	Argentina	12.04	
10	1	Xenia Hiebert	Paraguay	12.14	
11	1	Alinny Delgadillo	Bolivia	12.16	

Final – 24 May
Wind:
+0.6 m/s

Rank	Lane	Name	Nationality	Time	Notes
1st place, gold medalist(s)	4	Vitória Cristina Rosa	Brazil	11.24	
2nd place, silver medalist(s)	5	Andrea Purica	Venezuela	11.32	
3rd place, bronze medalist(s)	3	Gabriela Suárez	Ecuador	11.67	
4	6	Isidora Jiménez	Chile	11.68	
5	1	Yasmin Woodruff	Panama	11.69	
6	2	María Victoria Woodward	Argentina	11.70	
7	7	Andressa Fidelis	Brazil	11.79	
8	8	Eliecith Palacios	Colombia	11.86	

=== 200 meters ===
Heats – 25 May
Wind:
Heat 1: -0.3 m/s, Heat 2: -0.5 m/s

Rank	Heat	Name	Nationality	Time	Notes
1	2	Vitória Cristina Rosa	Brazil	22.99	Q
2	2	Andrea Purica	Venezuela	23.38	Q
3	1	Gabriela Suárez	Ecuador	23.57	Q
4	2	Jennifer Padilla	Colombia	23.70	Q
5	1	Isidora Jiménez	Chile	23.78	Q
6	2	Noelia Martínez	Argentina	23.78	q
7	1	Ana Azevedo	Brazil	23.94	Q
8	2	Yasmin Woodruff	Panama	24.20	q
9	1	María Victoria Woodward	Argentina	24.32	
10	2	Marina Poroso	Ecuador	25.16	
11	2	Cecilia Gómez	Bolivia	25.18	
12	1	Jenea McCammon	Guyana	25.23	
13	1	Alinny Delgadillo	Bolivia	25.67	
	1	Xenia Hiebert	Paraguay	DNS	

Final – 26 May
Wind:
+0.8 m/s

Rank	Lane	Name	Nationality	Time	Notes
1st place, gold medalist(s)	4	Vitória Cristina Rosa	Brazil	22.90	
2nd place, silver medalist(s)	5	Andrea Purica	Venezuela	23.37	
3rd place, bronze medalist(s)	3	Gabriela Suárez	Ecuador	23.65	
4	6	Jennifer Padilla	Colombia	23.67	
5	1	Ana Azevedo	Brazil	24.01	
6	8	Yasmin Woodruff	Panama	24.10	
	7	Noelia Martínez	Argentina	DQ	False start
	2	Isidora Jiménez	Chile	DNS	

=== 400 meters ===
Heats – 24 May

Rank	Heat	Name	Nationality	Time	Notes
1	1	Tiffani Marinho	Brazil	53.18	Q
2	1	Lina Licona	Colombia	53.25	Q
3	2	Geisa Coutinho	Brazil	53.72	Q
4	1	Noelia Martínez	Argentina	53.89	Q
5	2	Kimberly Cardoza	Peru	54.19	Q
6	2	María Fernanda Mackenna	Chile	54.21	Q
7	1	Maitte Torres	Peru	54.43	q
8	2	Eliana Chávez	Colombia	54.45	q
9	1	Cecilia Gómez	Bolivia	54.94	
10	1	Nicole Minota	Ecuador	55.04	
11	2	Virginia Villalba	Ecuador	55.18	
12	2	María Ayelén Diogo	Argentina	55.49	
13	1	Poulette Cardoch	Chile	57.17	
14	2	Lucia Sotomayor	Bolivia	58.04	

Final – 24 May

Rank	Lane	Name	Nationality	Time	Notes
1st place, gold medalist(s)	4	Tiffani Marinho	Brazil	52.81	
2nd place, silver medalist(s)	5	Lina Licona	Colombia	53.18	
3rd place, bronze medalist(s)	6	Noelia Martínez	Argentina	53.47	
4	3	Geisa Coutinho	Brazil	53.51	
5	8	Eliana Chávez	Colombia	53.66	
6	7	María Fernanda Mackenna	Chile	54.27	
7	2	Kimberly Cardoza	Peru	54.83	
8	1	Maitte Torres	Peru	55.25	

=== 800 meters ===
26 May

Rank	Name	Nationality	Time	Notes
1st place, gold medalist(s)	Déborah Rodríguez	Uruguay	2:02.68	
2nd place, silver medalist(s)	Andrea Calderón	Ecuador	2:05.49	
3rd place, bronze medalist(s)	Johana Arrieta	Colombia	2:05.91	
4	Rosangelica Escobar	Colombia	2:06.03	
5	Nicole Minota	Ecuador	2:06.38	
6	July da Silva	Brazil	2:07.63	
7	Mariana Borelli	Argentina	2:09.35	
8	Berdine Castillo	Chile	2:10.48	
9	Martina Escudero	Argentina	2:14.97	
10	Fátima Amarilla	Paraguay	2:16.73	
	Andrea Ferris	Panama	DNS	

=== 1500 meters ===
24 May

Rank	Name	Nationality	Time	Notes
1st place, gold medalist(s)	María Pía Fernández	Uruguay	4:27.44	
2nd place, silver medalist(s)	Mariana Borelli	Argentina	4:27.83	
3rd place, bronze medalist(s)	July da Silva	Brazil	4:27.93	
4	Florencia Borelli	Argentina	4:28.22	
5	Rosibel García	Colombia	4:29.81	
6	Johana Arrieta	Colombia	4:31.50	
7	Katherine Tisalema	Ecuador	4:32.51	
8	Andrea Ferris	Panama	4:32.69	
9	María Veronica Domínguez	Paraguay	4:37.12	
10	Helen Baltazar	Bolivia	4:46.66	
	Tatiane Raquel da Silva	Brazil	DNS	

=== 5000 meters ===
26 May

Rank	Name	Nationality	Time	Notes
1st place, gold medalist(s)	Florencia Borelli	Argentina	15:42.60	
2nd place, silver medalist(s)	Carolina Tabares	Colombia	15:46.04	
3rd place, bronze medalist(s)	Luz Mery Rojas	Peru	15:46.27	
4	Saida Meneses	Peru	15:47.16	
5	Fedra Luna	Argentina	16:17.18	
6	Muriel Coneo	Colombia	16:34.58	
7	Simone Ferraz	Brazil	16:37.06	
8	Carmen Toaquiza	Ecuador	16:38.70	
9	Edith Mamani	Bolivia	16:42.77	
10	Salome Mendoza	Bolivia	17:03.55	

=== 10,000 meters ===
24 May

Rank	Name	Nationality	Time	Notes
1st place, gold medalist(s)	Carolina Tabares	Colombia	33:36.77	
2nd place, silver medalist(s)	Tatiele de Carvalho	Brazil	33:40.76	
3rd place, bronze medalist(s)	Muriel Coneo	Colombia	33:43.00	
4	Thalia Valdivia	Peru	33:48.46	
5	Nélida Sulca	Peru	34:03.00	
6	María Luz Tesuri	Argentina	34:32.02	
7	Diana Landi	Ecuador	34:43.97	
8	Silvia Ortiz	Ecuador	36:25.65	
9	María Añazco	Paraguay	38:11.27	

=== 100 meters hurdles ===
Heats – 24 May
Wind:
Heat 1: +0.4 m/s, Heat 2: +0.2 m/s

Rank	Heat	Name	Nationality	Time	Notes
1	2	Génesis Romero	Venezuela	13.38	Q
2	1	Yoveinny Mota	Venezuela	13.45	Q
3	2	María Ignacia Eguiguren	Chile	13.62	Q
4	2	Diana Bazalar	Peru	13.70	Q
5	1	Jenea McCammon	Guyana	13.89	Q
6	1	Eliecith Palacios	Colombia	13.89	Q
7	1	Adelly Santos	Brazil	14.00	q
8	2	Mariza Karabia	Paraguay	14.13	q
9	1	Florencia Lamboglia	Argentina	14.27	
9	2	María Sánchez	Argentina	14.27	

Final – 24 May
Wind:
-0.1 m/s

Rank	Lane	Name	Nationality	Time	Notes
1st place, gold medalist(s)	4	Génesis Romero	Venezuela	13.29	
2nd place, silver medalist(s)	2	Eliecith Palacios	Colombia	13.49	
3rd place, bronze medalist(s)	1	Adelly Santos	Brazil	13.64	
4	5	Yoveinny Mota	Venezuela	13.65	
5	6	Diana Bazalar	Peru	13.84	
6	8	Mariza Karabia	Paraguay	14.41	
7	7	Jenea McCammon	Guyana	14.93	
	3	María Ignacia Eguiguren	Chile	DNF	

=== 400 meters hurdles ===
25 May

Rank	Lane	Name	Nationality	Time	Notes
1st place, gold medalist(s)	3	Melissa Gonzalez	Colombia	55.73	CR
2nd place, silver medalist(s)	4	Gianna Woodruff	Panama	56.76	
3rd place, bronze medalist(s)	1	Fiorella Chiappe	Argentina	57.03	
4	6	Alessandra Silva	Brazil	57.18	
5	5	Marlene Santos	Brazil	57.43	
6	7	Kimberly Cardoza	Peru	58.38	
7	2	Valeria Cabezas	Colombia	58.85	
8	8	Valeria Baron	Argentina	1:02.90	

=== 3000 meters steeplechase ===
25 May

Rank	Name	Nationality	Time	Notes
1st place, gold medalist(s)	Tatiane Raquel da Silva	Brazil	9:45.52	CR
2nd place, silver medalist(s)	Belén Casetta	Argentina	10:04.54	
3rd place, bronze medalist(s)	Simone Ferraz	Brazil	10:05.88	
4	Rina Cjuro	Peru	10:09.72	
5	Andrea Ferris	Panama	10:14.00	
6	Tania Chávez	Bolivia	10:15.83	
7	Rolanda Bell	Panama	10:17.19	
8	Edith Mamani	Bolivia	10:18.40	
9	Katherine Tisalema	Ecuador	10:20.72	
10	Margarita Nuñez	Peru	10:33.89	
	Carolina Lozano	Argentina	DNF	

=== 4 × 100 meters relay ===
25 May

Rank	Lane	Nation	Competitors	Time	Notes
1st place, gold medalist(s)	6	Brazil	Anny de Bassi, Ana Azevedo, Bruna Farias, Andressa Fidelis	44.70	
2nd place, silver medalist(s)	3	Colombia	Melissa Gonzalez, Jennifer Padilla, Eliana Chávez, Eliecith Palacios	44.97	
3rd place, bronze medalist(s)	4	Argentina	Florencia Lamboglia, Noelia Martínez, María Sánchez, María Victoria Woodward	45.65	
4	2	Ecuador	Katherine Chillambo, Marina Poroso, Virginia Villalba, Gabriela Suárez	45.72	
5	5	Peru	Diana Bazalar, Paola Mautino, Triana Alonso, Giara Garate	46.60	

=== 4 × 400 meters relay ===
26 May

Rank	Nation	Competitors	Time	Notes
1st place, gold medalist(s)	Colombia	Lina Licona, Melissa Gonzalez, Eliana Chávez, Jennifer Padilla	3:32.81	
2nd place, silver medalist(s)	Brazil	Ana Azevedo, Marlene Santos, Alessandra Silva, Tiffani Marinho	3:35.29	
3rd place, bronze medalist(s)	Argentina	María Ayelén Diogo, Fiorella Chiappe, Valeria Baron, Noelia Martínez	3:36.76	
4	Chile	Poulette Cardoch, Berdine Castillo, María Fernanda Mackenna, María José Echeverría	3:37.35	
5	Peru	Esperanza Mnrique, Kimberly Cardoza, Maitte Torres, Triana Alonso	3:42.74	NR
6	Ecuador	Nicole Minota, Andrea Calderon, Marina Poroso, Virginia Villalba	3:42.91	

=== 20,000 meters walk ===
25 May

Rank	Name	Nationality	Time	Notes
1st place, gold medalist(s)	Karla Jaramillo	Ecuador	1:30:52.00	AR
2nd place, silver medalist(s)	Ángela Castro	Bolivia	1:32:36.00	
3rd place, bronze medalist(s)	Leyde Guerra	Peru	1:33:40.00	
4	Evelyn Inga	Peru	1:34:30.00	
5	Arabelly Orjuela	Colombia	1:35:33.00	
6	Anastasia Sanzana	Chile	1:46:45.00	
	Sandra Arenas	Colombia	DNS	

=== High jump ===
26 May

Rank	Name	Nationality	1.60	1.65	1.70	1.75	1.80	1.83	1.86	1.90	1.96	Result	Notes
1st place, gold medalist(s)	María Fernanda Murillo	Colombia	–	–	–	xo	o	–	o	xo	xxx	1.90	
2nd place, silver medalist(s)	Valdiléia Martins	Brazil	–	–	–	o	o	xxx				1.80	
3rd place, bronze medalist(s)	Monique Varmeling	Brazil	–	–	o	o	xxx					1.75	
3rd place, bronze medalist(s)	Eloisa Páez	Argentina	–	o	o	o	xxx					1.75	
5	Candy Toche	Peru	–	o	xo	o	xxx					1.75	
6	Daniella Muñoz	Peru	o	o	xo	xxx						1.70	
7	Lorena Aires	Uruguay	–	xo	xo	xxx						1.70	
8	Carla Ríos	Bolivia	o	xxo	xxx							1.65	

=== Pole vault ===
25 May

Rank	Name	Nationality	3.71	3.91	4.11	4.26	4.36	4.46	4.56	4.66	Result	Notes
1st place, gold medalist(s)	Robeilys Peinado	Venezuela	–	–	–	o	o	xxo	o	xxx	4.56	
2nd place, silver medalist(s)	Katherine Castillo	Colombia	–	–	xxo	xxx					4.11	
3rd place, bronze medalist(s)	Juliana Campos	Brazil	–	xo	xxx						3.91	
4	Nicole Hein	Peru	o	xxx							3.71	
5	Isabel Demarco de Quadros	Brazil	xo	xxx							3.71	
	Ana Quiñónez	Ecuador	xxx								NM	

=== Long jump ===
25 May

Rank	Name	Nationality	#1	#2	#3	#4	#5	#6	Result	Notes
1st place, gold medalist(s)	Eliane Martins	Brazil	x	6.48	x	6.11	6.71	x	6.71	
2nd place, silver medalist(s)	Keila Costa	Brazil	6.35	x	6.38	x	6.11	6.35	6.38	
3rd place, bronze medalist(s)	Macarena Reyes	Chile	6.08	x	6.13	x	6.18	6.36	6.36	
4	Nathalie Aranda	Panama	x	x	6.17	x	6.25	x	6.25	
5	Génesis Romero	Venezuela	6.00	x	6.24	5.57	6.08	6.05	6.24	
6	Paola Mautino	Peru	5.81	6.04	6.16	5.95	6.06	6.15	6.16	
7	Yosiris Urrutia	Colombia	5.58	5.82	5.67	x	6.00	6.06	6.06	
8	Valeria Quispe	Bolivia	5.62	5.73	x	x	5.72	5.76	5.76	
9	Silvana Segura	Peru	x	5.66	x				5.66	

=== Triple jump ===
24 May

Rank	Name	Nationality	#1	#2	#3	#4	#5	#6	Result	Notes
1st place, gold medalist(s)	Yosiris Urrutia	Colombia	13.29	13.60	13.85	13.67	13.51	13.51	13.85	
2nd place, silver medalist(s)	Liuba Zaldivar	Ecuador	13.42	13.29	13.45	x	13.33	13.44	13.45	
3rd place, bronze medalist(s)	Gabriele dos Santos	Brazil	12.70	12.75	12.97	13.30	13.16	–	13.30	
4	Candy Toche	Peru	12.40	12.67	12.81	12.82	x	12.87	12.87	
5	Silvana Segura	Peru	12.45	12.58	12.35	12.70	12.39	12.47	12.70	
6	Valeria Quispe	Bolivia	x	x	x	x	x	12.69	12.69	

=== Shot put ===
26 May

Rank	Name	Nationality	#1	#2	#3	#4	#5	#6	Result	Notes
1st place, gold medalist(s)	Ahimara Espinoza	Venezuela	17.14	16.71	x	17.44	16.42	17.27	17.44	
2nd place, silver medalist(s)	Geisa Arcanjo	Brazil	16.26	17.10	x	16.96	x	17.16	17.16	
3rd place, bronze medalist(s)	Ángela Rivas	Colombia	x	16.37	17.08	16.60	17.10	16.73	17.10	
4	Ivanna Gallardo	Chile	15.40	x	x	16.01	16.77	15.49	16.77	
5	Keely Medeiros	Brazil	16.51	16.46	16.49	16.66	16.48	16.22	16.66	

=== Discus throw ===
24 May

Rank	Name	Nationality	#1	#2	#3	#4	#5	#6	Result	Notes
1st place, gold medalist(s)	Andressa de Morais	Brazil	62.04	x	57.60	62.42	61.69	60.58	62.42	
2nd place, silver medalist(s)	Fernanda Martins	Brazil	58.99	58.57	x	60.87	60.75	58.96	60.87	
3rd place, bronze medalist(s)	Ailen Armada	Argentina	53.32	x	52.34	53.29	56.55	x	56.55	
4	Karen Gallardo	Chile	52.35	51.24	x	52.95	55.09	55.02	55.09	
5	Aixa Middleton	Panama	45.42	x	x	x	50.57	49.82	50.57	
6	Ivanna Gallardo	Chile	45.26	x	50.12	x	50.22	x	50.22	

=== Hammer throw ===
25 May

Rank	Name	Nationality	#1	#2	#3	#4	#5	#6	Result	Notes
1st place, gold medalist(s)	Mariana Marcelino	Brazil	66.78	x	63.61	63.35	66.60	x	66.78	
2nd place, silver medalist(s)	Rosa Rodríguez	Venezuela	65.69	64.85	66.45	x	x	65.72	66.45	
3rd place, bronze medalist(s)	Jennifer Dahlgren	Argentina	63.85	65.06	x	x	x	64.16	65.06	
4	Valeria Chiliquinga	Ecuador	64.50	63.07	62.27	63.46	x	62.70	64.50	
5	Mayra Gaviria	Colombia	60.46	59.86	x	63.92	x	61.08	63.92	
6	Mariana García	Chile	56.86	63.27	62.69	62.49	x	59.45	63.27	
7	Daniela Gómez	Argentina	53.68	60.69	59.98	60.10	59.81	57.98	60.69	
8	Ximena Zorrilla	Peru	55.32	57.21	x	x	56.14	54.07	57.21	

=== Javelin throw ===
24 May

Rank	Name	Nationality	#1	#2	#3	#4	#5	#6	Result	Notes
1st place, gold medalist(s)	Laila Domingos	Brazil	57.79	53.16	51.52	55.35	53.10	53.01	57.79	
2nd place, silver medalist(s)	María Lucelly Murillo	Colombia	57.24	54.05	56.00	x	x	51.93	57.24	
3rd place, bronze medalist(s)	Flor Ruiz	Colombia	54.00	56.07	54.10	52.69	52.65	54.82	56.07	
4	Rafaela Gonçalves	Brazil	46.66	48.88	53.20	52.20	51.59	51.39	53.20	
5	María Paz Ríos	Chile	44.29	48.02	46.37	49.16	x	47.34	49.16	
6	Yhoana Arias	Argentina	45.30	46.58	45.07	46.14	x	46.98	46.98	
7	Nadia Requena	Peru	40.67	42.92	43.12	42.74	45.37	45.36	45.37	

=== Heptathlon ===
25–26 May

The highest mark recorded in each event is highlighted in yellow

Rank	Athlete	Nationality	100m H	HJ	SP	200m	LJ	JT	800m	Points	Notes
1st place, gold medalist(s)	Luisarys Toledo	Venezuela	14.12	1.69	12.84	24.56	6.22	43.79	2:15.67	5989	CR, NR
2nd place, silver medalist(s)	Vanessa Chefer Spínola	Brazil	14.19	1.72	12.67	24.56	6.13	37.23	2:17.81	5823	
3rd place, bronze medalist(s)	Martha Araújo	Colombia	13.89	1.69	11.34	25.25	5.83	48.57	2:24.73	5708	
4	Ana Camila Pirelli	Paraguay	13.82	1.63	12.97	24.97	5.15	46.57	2:13.84	5694	
5	Martina Corra	Argentina	14.81	1.60	11.06	26.13	5.35	36.81	2:39.25	4832	
6	Jenifer Nicole Norberto	Brazil	14.58	1.63	12.27	26.08	NM	29.07	DNF	3597	
