= Athletics at the 2010 South American Games – Men's 100 metres =

The Men's 100m event at the 2010 South American Games was held on March 20, with the heats at 12:10 and the Final at 19:40.

== Medalists ==
| Gold | Silver | Bronze |
|---|---|---|
| Isidro Montoya; Colombia | Álvaro Gómez; Colombia | Diego Rivas; Venezuela |

== Records ==
Standing records prior to the 2010 South American Games
| World record | Usain Bolt | Jamaica | 9.58 | Berlin, Germany | 16 August 2009 |
| World Leading | Nesta Carter | Jamaica | 10.15 | Kingston, Jamaica | 30 January 2010 |
| South American record | Robson da Silva | Brazil | 10.00 | Mexico City, Mexico | 22 July 1988 |
| South American U23 record | Robson da Silva | Brazil | 10.02 | La Habana, Cuba | 27 September 1986 |

== Results ==
Results were published.

=== Heats ===
==== Heat 1 ====
| Rank | Athlete | Nationality | Reaction | Result | Notes |
|---|---|---|---|---|---|
| 1 | Álvaro Gómez | Colombia | 0.190 | 10.67 | Q |
| 2 | Ifrish Alberg | Suriname | 0.203 | 10.73 | Q |
| 3 | Hensley Paulina | Netherlands Antilles | 0.143 | 10.73 | Q, SB, ^{†} |
| 4 | Diego Rivas | Venezuela | 0.181 | 10.79 | q |
| 5 | Juan Manuel Jassid | Argentina | 0.156 | 11.03 | |
| 6 | Rubens Quirino | Brazil | 0.185 | 11.04 | |
| 7 | Fernando Tomás Gómez | Chile | 0.139 | 11.13 | |
| | | | Wind: -2.4 m/s | | |

^{†}: Not eligible for the South American Under-23 Championships.

==== Heat 2 ====
| Rank | Athlete | Nationality | Reaction | Result | Notes |
|---|---|---|---|---|---|
| 1 | Isidro Montoya | Colombia | 0.171 | 10.47 | Q |
| 2 | Gustavo dos Santos | Brazil | 0.216 | 10.66 | Q, SB |
| 3 | Michel Mary | Uruguay | 0.209 | 10.70 | Q, SB |
| 4 | Chavez Ageday | Guyana | 0.194 | 10.87 | q |
| 5 | Franco Boccardo | Chile | 0.206 | 10.98 | |
| | Álvaro Cassiani | Venezuela | F_{1} | DSQ | |
| | Matías Robledo | Argentina | F_{2} | DSQ | |
| | | | Wind: +0.2 m/s | | |

=== Final ===
| Rank | Athlete | Nationality | Reaction | Result | Notes |
|---|---|---|---|---|---|
| 1st place, gold medalist(s) | Isidro Montoya | Colombia | 0.203 | 10.25 | w |
| 2nd place, silver medalist(s) | Álvaro Gómez | Colombia | 0.197 | 10.26 | w |
| 3rd place, bronze medalist(s) | Diego Rivas | Venezuela | 0.146 | 10.50 | w |
| 4 | Hensley Paulina | Netherlands Antilles | 0.133 | 10.55 | w, ^{†} |
| 5 | Michel Mary | Uruguay | 0.174 | 10.57 | w |
| 6 | Ifrish Alberg | Suriname | 0.239 | 10.59 | w |
| 7 | Gustavo dos Santos | Brazil | 0.174 | 10.61 | w |
| 8 | Chavez Ageday | Guyana | 0.184 | 10.82 | w |
| | | Wind: +2.2 m/s | | | |

^{†}: Not eligible for the South American Under-23 Championships.

== See also ==
- 2010 South American Under-23 Championships in Athletics
