= Bruno Rojas =

Bolivian sprinter (born 1993)

Personal information
- Full name: Artur Bruno Rojas da Silva
- Born: 27 May 1993 (age 33) Cochabamba, Bolivia
- Height: 1.83 m (6 ft 0 in)
- Weight: 67 kg (148 lb)

Sport
- Country: Bolivia
- Sport: Athletics
- Event: Sprinting
- Updated on 22 August 2021

Artur Bruno Rojas da Silva (born 27 May 1993) is a Bolivian sprinter. He competed in 100 metres at the 2012 Summer Olympics in London, where he had the honor of winning the first 100-metre heat.

He participated at the 2020 Summer Olympics on Universality places for ending his career.

== Personal bests ==
Event	Result	Venue	Date
100 m	10.36 s (wind: 0.0 m/s)	Sucre, Bolivia	20 May 2012
200 m	20.63 s (wind: 1.7 m/s)	Cochabamba, Bolivia	24 April 2016

== Competition record ==
Year	Competition	Venue	Position	Event	Notes
Representing Bolivia
2009	World Youth Championship	Bressanone, Italy	55th (h)	200 m	23.01 (wind: +1.2 m/s)
2010	Youth Olympic Games	Singapore	15th (B)	100 m	10.90 (wind: 0.0 m/s)
2011	South American Championships	Buenos Aires, Argentina	12th (h)	100m	10.78 (wind: +0.4 m/s)
2011	South American Championships	Buenos Aires, Argentina	10th (h)	200m	21.55 (wind: +0.6 m/s)
2012	World Junior Championships	Barcelona, Spain	39th (h)	100 m	10.80 (wind: -1.6 m/s)
2012	World Junior Championships	Barcelona, Spain	51st (h)	200 m	21.92 (wind: -1.6 m/s)
2012	Olympic Games	London, United Kingdom	49th (h)	100m	10.65 (wind: +1.5 m/s)
2012	South American U23 Championships	São Paulo, Brazil	7th	100m	10.76 (wind: +0.3 m/s)
2012	South American U23 Championships	São Paulo, Brazil	7th	200m	21.81 (wind: +1.2 m/s)
2013	Bolivarian Games	Trujillo, Peru	6th (h)	100m	10.96 (wind: +0.3 m/s)
2013	Bolivarian Games	Trujillo, Peru	6th (h)	200m	21.87 (wind: -1.4 m/s)
2013	Bolivarian Games	Trujillo, Peru	5th	4 × 100 m relay	41.51
2014	South American U23 Championships	Montevideo, Uruguay	7th	100m	10.96 (wind: +0.3 m/s)
2014	South American U23 Championships	Montevideo, Uruguay	5th	200m	21.56 (wind: +1.4 m/s)
2015	South American Championships	Lima, Peru	4th (h)	100m	10.78 (wind: -0.9 m/s)
2015	South American Championships	Lima, Peru	7th	200m	21.87 (wind: 0.0 m/s)
2016	Ibero-American Championships	Rio de Janeiro, Brazil	15th (sf)	100 m	10.54
2017	Bolivarian Games	Santa Marta, Colombia	12th (h)	200 m	22.27
2017	Bolivarian Games	Santa Marta, Colombia	4th	4 × 100 m relay	41.63
2019	South American Championships	Lima, Peru	12th (h)	100 m	10.75
2019	South American Championships	Lima, Peru	11th (h)	200 m	21.76
2019	South American Championships	Lima, Peru	7th	4 × 100 m relay	41.73
2021	South American Championships	Guayaquil, Ecuador	10th (h)	100 m	10.71
2021	South American Championships	Guayaquil, Ecuador	11th (h)	200 m	21.72
2021	Olympic Games	Tokyo, Japan	11th (p)	100 m	10.64
2026	South American Games	Santa Fe, Argentina	8th	Mixed 4 × 100 m relay	44.63
