= Adelly =

Adelly is a given name and surname. Notable people with the name include:

- Adelly Santos, Brazilian hurdler
- Georg Adelly, Swedish film actor
