= Alexander Bowen =

Panamanian high jumper (born 1993)

Personal information
- Full name: Alexander Raphael Bowen Smith
- Born: April 3, 1993 (age 33)
- Education: University at Albany, SUNY
- Height: 1.92 m (6 ft 4 in)
- Weight: 83 kg (183 lb)

Sport
- Sport: Athletics
- Event: High jump

Alexander Raphael Bowen Smith (born 3 April 1993) is a Panamanian athlete specialising in the high jump. He won a bronze medal at the 2015 South American Championships.

His personal bests in the event are 2.22 m (7 ft 3 in) outdoors (Binghamton, NY 2013) and 2.22 m (7 ft 3 in) indoors (Boston 2013).

== International competitions ==
| Year | Competition | Venue | Position | Notes |
Representing Panama
| 2014 | Central American Championships | Tegucigalpa, Honduras | 1st | 2.16 m |
| 2014 | Ibero-American Championships | São Paulo, Brazil | 6th | 2.15 m |
| 2014 | Pan American Sports Festival | Mexico City, Mexico | 7th | 2.10 m |
| 2014 | South American U23 Championships | Montevideo, Uruguay | 3rd | 2.15 m |
| 2014 | South American U23 Championships | Xalapa, Mexico | 6th | 2.15 m |
| 2015 | South American Championships | Lima, Peru | 3rd | 2.19 m |
| 2015 | Central American Championships | Managua, Nicaragua | 1st | 2.15 m |
| 2016 | Ibero-American Championships | Rio de Janeiro, Brazil | 8th | 2.15 m |
| 2017 | Central American Championships | Tegucigalpa, Honduras | 1st | 2.17 m |
| 2017 | Bolivarian Games | Santa Marta, Colombia | 3rd | 2.15 m |
| 2017 | Central American Games | Managua, Nicaragua | 1st | 2.10 m |
| 2018 | South American Games | Cochabamba, Bolivia | 5th | 2.19 m |
| 2018 | Central American and Caribbean Games | Barranquilla, Colombia | 7th | 2.19 m |
| 2019 | South American Championships | Lima, Peru | 1st | 2.21 m |
