= Gerard Giraldo =

Colombian runner (born 1989)

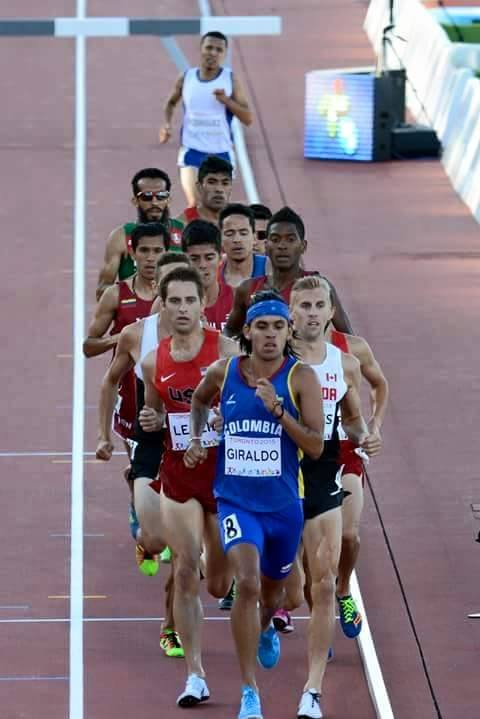

Personal information
- Full name: Gerard Nicolas Giraldo Villa
- Born: 21 March 1989 (age 37) Armenia, Colombia
- Height: 1.74 m (5 ft 9 in)
- Weight: 60 kg (132 lb)

Sport
- Country: Colombia
- Sport: Athletics
- Event(s): Middle-distance and long distance running

Gerard Nicolas Giraldo Villa (born 21 March 1989) is a Colombian athlete competing in middle-distance and long distance running events. He specialises in the 3000 metres steeplechase. He competed at the 2015 World Championships.

At the 2015 South American Championships he won the steeplechase in a championship record time of 8:29.53 minutes and also set a Colombian record of 3:42.38 minutes for the 1500 metres, winning a bronze medal. He was the silver medallist in the steeplechase at the 2014 South American Games behind José Peña.

== Competition record ==
Year	Competition	Venue	Position	Event	Notes
Representing Colombia
2008	Central American and Caribbean Championships	Cali, Colombia	4th	3000 m s'chase	9:40.17
2011	South American Championships	Buenos Aires, Argentina	6th	3000 m s'chase	8:44.48
2013	South American Championships	Cartagena, Colombia	4th	3000 m s'chase	8:45.14
2013	Bolivarian Games	Trujillo, Peru	3rd	10,000 m	29:03.59
2013	Bolivarian Games	Trujillo, Peru	2nd	3000 m s'chase	8:28.6
2014	South American Games	Santiago, Chile	–	10,000 m	DNF
2014	South American Games	Santiago, Chile	2nd	3000 m s'chase	8:45.96
2014	Pan American Sports Festival	Mexico City, Mexico	2nd	3000 m s'chase	9:19.91
2014	Central American and Caribbean Games	Xalapa, Mexico	–	5000 m	DNF
2014	Central American and Caribbean Games	Xalapa, Mexico	4th	3000 m s'chase	8:56.59
2015	South American Championships	Lima, Peru	3rd	1500 m	3:42.38
2015	South American Championships	Lima, Peru	1st	3000 m s'chase	8:29.53
2015	Pan American Games	Toronto, Canada	–	3000 m s'chase	DNF
2015	World Championships	Beijing, China	36th (h)	3000 m s'chase	9:16.47
2017	South American Championships	Asunción, Paraguay	1st	3000 m s'chase	8:45.93
2017	Bolivarian Games	Santa Marta, Colombia	2nd	3000 m s'chase	8:40.12
2018	South American Games	Cochabamba, Bolivia	2nd	3000 m s'chase	9:01.99
2018	Central American and Caribbean Games	Barranquilla, Colombia	1st	3000 m s'chase	8:44.51
2019	South American Championships	Lima, Peru	3rd	5000 m	13:54.51
2019	South American Championships	Lima, Peru	3rd	3000 m s'chase	8:41.48
2019	World Championships	Doha, Qatar	–	5000 m	DNF
2022	South American Games	Asunción, Paraguay	–	10,000 m	DNF
2022	South American Games	Asunción, Paraguay	1st	3000 m s'chase	8:40.28

== Personal bests ==
Event	Time	City	Country	Date
1500 m	3:42.38	Lima	Peru	13 June 2015
3000 m	8:10.46	Belém	Brazil	10 August 2014
5000 m	13:21.31	Stanford	United States	2 May 2019
10,000 m	28:51.16	Tijuana	Mexico	8 September 2019
3000 m steeplechase	8:28.6	Trujillo	Peru	29 November 2013
10K run	30:10	Cipolletti	Argentina	8 March 2014
15K run	45:45	Tulua	Colombia	12 February 2012
Half marathon	1:07:48	Bogotá	Colombia	29 July 2012
Marathon	2:17:29	Hamburg	Germany	17 April 2017
