= 2015 South American Championships in Athletics =

49th South American Championships
- Official logo
- Dates: 12–14 June
- Host city: Lima, Peru
- Venue: Videna Stadium
- Level: Senior
- Events: 44 (22 men, 22 women)
- Participation: 333 athletes from 13 nations
- Records set: 8

The 2015 South American Championships in Athletics (Spanish: Campeonato Sudamericano Mayores 2015) was the 49th edition of the biennial athletics competition between South American nations. The event was held in the Peruvian capital of Lima from 12 to 14 June at the Videna Stadium. It was the eighth time Lima hosted the event, having last done so for the 2009 edition. A total of 44 events were held, evenly divided between the sexes, continuing with the event programme established in 2001.

Brazil topped both the medal and points tables, with 11 golds, 34 medals, and 285 points. This extended the nation's unbeaten run at the tournament to 22 editions, having last lost in 1974. Colombia and Venezuela were clear as the next most successful nations, each gathering 22 medals; Colombia ranked second on medals with nine gold and Venezuela ranked second on points with 228. Brazil won both the men's and women's team titles, with Venezuela coming second in the women's rankings and Colombia runner-up in the men's.

Sandra Arenas of Colombia provided the highlight performance of the meeting with a South American record of 1:31:02.3 hours—a 42-second improvement—to defend her 20,000 m racewalk title. A total of nine championship records were improved. Colombians Gerard Giraldo (men's steeplechase), Muriel Coneo (women's 1500 m) and Evelis Aguilar (heptathlon) made it four records for their nation. Brazil's field athletes set two championship records through men's javelin thrower Júlio César de Oliveira and women's discus thrower Andressa de Morais. Ecuador's Bayron Piedra (men's 10,000 m) and Déborah Rodríguez of Uruguay (women's 400 m hurdles) rounded out the eight record breakers. A total of sixteen national records in athletics were also improved at the competition.

Two athletes completed individual doubles at the championships, both women. Muriel Coneo of Colombia won both the 1500 metres and 3000 metres steeplechase titles – a feat she had managed at the 2014 South American Games. Uruguay's Déborah Rodríguez did a shorter flat and barriers combination by winning the 800 metres and 400 metres hurdles, both in a national record time. Venezuelan women's sprint duo Nediam Vargas and Nercely Soto each won four medals, reaching both individual and relay podiums and including a gold medal from each. All winners at the competition gained qualification in their event for the 2015 World Championships in Athletics, in line with new IAAF rules.

== Medal summary ==
=== Men ===
Event	Gold		Silver		Bronze	
100 metres	Diego Palomeque (COL)	10.40	Álex Quiñónez (ECU)	10.43	Ifrish Alberg (SUR)	10.57
200 metres	Álex Quiñónez (ECU)	20.76	Diego Palomeque (COL)	21.15	Arturo Deliser (PAN)	21.25
400 metres	Alberth Bravo (VEN)	45.26	Hederson Estefani (BRA)	45.57	Freddy Mezones (VEN)	45.67
800 metres^{[nb1]}	Rafith Rodríguez (COL)	1:46.48	Lucirio Antonio Garrido (VEN)	1:47.83	Jhon Sinisterra (COL)	1:48.50
1500 metres	Carlos Díaz (CHI)	3:40.79	Federico Bruno (ARG)	3:42.21	Gerard Giraldo (COL)	3:42.38 NR
5000 metres	Víctor Aravena (CHI)	14:06.14	Federico Bruno (ARG)	14:06.25	Bayron Piedra (ECU)	14:08.84
10,000 metres	Bayron Piedra (ECU)	28:30.80 CR	Mauricio González (COL)	28:33.53	José Luis Ostos (PER)	28:43.10 NR
110 metres hurdles	João Vítor de Oliveira (BRA)	13.96	Jorge McFarlane (PER)	13.99	Javier McFarlane (PER)	14.00
400 metres hurdles	Andrés Silva (URU)	49.43	Hederson Estefani (BRA)	49.54	Víctor Solarte (VEN)	50.83
3000 m steeplechase	Gerard Giraldo (COL)	8:29.53 CR	Mauricio Valdivia (CHI)	8:40.28	Enzo Yáñez (CHI)	8:43.28
4 × 100 metres relay	Ecuador (ECU); Anderson Quintero; Jhon Valencia; Franklin Nazareno; Álex Quiñónez	39.94	Venezuela (VEN); Diego Rivas; Arturo Ramírez; Álvaro Cassiani; Dubeiker Cedeño	40.19	Colombia (COL); Yeferson Valencia; Diego Palomeque; Jeyson Rivas; Carlos Lemos	40.80
4 × 400 metres relay	Venezuela (VEN); Alberth Bravo; José Meléndez; Alberto Aguilar; Freddy Mezones	3:04.96	Chile (CHI); Martín Tagle; Sergio Aldea; Sergio Germain; Enzo Faulbaum	3:10.32	Peru (PER); Bryan Erazo; Williams García; Luis Saavedra; Paulo Herrera	3:14.64
20,000 m track walk	Pavel Chihuán (PER)	1:23:34 NR	Juan Manuel Cano (ARG)	1:23:56	Mauricio Arteaga (ECU)	1:24:18
High jump	Fernando Carvalho Ferreira (BRA)	2.22 m	Talles Frederico Silva (BRA)	2.22 m	Alexander Bowen (PAN)	2.19 m
Pole vault	Germán Chiaraviglio (ARG)	5.70 m	Daniel Zupeuc (CHI)	5.00 m	José Gutiérrez Pozo (PER)	4.70 m
Long jump	Emiliano Lasa (URU)	8.09 m NR	Diego Hernández (VEN)	7.91 m w	Mauro Vinícius da Silva (BRA)	7.81 m
Triple jump	Jhon Murillo (COL)	16.55 m	Jefferson Sabino (BRA)	16.34 m	Divier Murillo (COL)	16.34 m
Shot put	Germán Lauro (ARG)	20.77 m	Darlan Romani (BRA)	20.32 m	Nelson Henrique Fernandes (BRA)	18.28 m
Discus throw	Mauricio Ortega (COL)	61.36 m	Ronald Julião (BRA)	59.80 m	Juan Caicedo (ECU)	54.88 m
Hammer throw	Wagner Domingos (BRA)	71.47 m	Allan Wolski (BRA)	69.82 m	Juan Ignacio Cerra (ARG)	67.70 m
Javelin throw	Júlio César de Oliveira (BRA)	81.22 m CR NR	Braian Toledo (ARG)	79.34 m	Arley Ibargüen (COL)	75.47 m
Decathlon	Luiz Alberto de Araújo (BRA)	7799 pts	Georni Jaramillo (VEN)	7454 pts	Óscar Campos (VEN)	6857 pts

- ^{nb1} Uruguay's Javier Marmo set a national record of 1:49.16 minutes while placing fourth in the men's 800 metres.

=== Women ===
Event	Gold		Silver		Bronze	
100 metres	Nediam Vargas (VEN)	11.45	Isidora Jiménez (CHI)	11.51	Vanusa dos Santos (BRA)	11.60
200 metres	Nercely Soto (VEN)	23.15	Isidora Jiménez (CHI)	23.38	Nediam Vargas (VEN)	23.60
400 metres	Geisa Coutinho (BRA)	53.07	Nercely Soto (VEN)	54.38	Liliane Fernandes (BRA)	54.53
800 metres	Déborah Rodríguez (URU)	2:01.46 NR	Flávia de Lima (BRA)	2:02.05	Ydanis Navas (VEN)	2:07.92
1500 metres	Muriel Coneo (COL)	4:10.14 CR	Flávia de Lima (BRA)	4:13.58	Pia Fernandez (URU)	4:19.37 NR
5000 metres	María Pastuña (ECU)	15:49.33	Tatiele Roberta de Carvalho (BRA)	15:50.62	Carolina Tabares (COL)	15:59.28
10,000 metres	Inés Melchor (PER)	32:28.87	María Pastuña (ECU)	32:51.33	Wilma Arizapana (PER)	33:1.15
100 metres hurdles	Yvette Lewis (PAN)	13.31	Brigitte Merlano (COL)	13.43	Adelly Santos (BRA)	13.53
400 metres hurdles	Déborah Rodríguez (URU)	56.33 CR NR	Magdalena Mendoza (VEN)	56.65 NR	Liliane Fernandes (BRA)	58.44
3000 m steeplechase	Muriel Coneo (COL)	9:53.1	Tatiane Raquel da Silva (BRA)	9:56.8	Belén Casetta (ARG)	9:57.1 NR
4 × 100 metres relay	Venezuela (VEN); Lexabeth Hidalgo; Magdalena Mendoza; Nediam Vargas Arteaga; Nercely Soto	44.28	Brazil (BRA); Vanusa dos Santos; Bruna Farias; Vitoria Cristina Rosa; Adelly Oliveira	44.43	Chile (CHI); Josefina Gutiérrez; Isidora Jiménez; Maria Fernanda Mackenna; Paula Goñi	44.83 NR
4 × 400 metres relay^{[nb2]}	Brazil (BRA); Vanusa dos Santos; Liliane Fernandes; Joelma Sousa; Jailma de Lima	3:34.51	Venezuela (VEN); Nercely Soto; Magdalena Mendoza; Maryury Valdez; Ydanis Navas	3:37.05	Chile (CHI); Paula Goñi; Carmen Mansilla; Javiera Errázuriz; Maria Fernanda Mackenna	3:40.56
20,000 m track walk	Sandra Arenas (COL)	1:31:2.3 CR AR	Ingrid Hernández (COL)	1:36:42.1	Ángela Castro (BOL)	1:41:38.3
High jump	Ana Paula Caetano de Oliveira (BRA)	1.82 m	Candy Toche (PER)	1.76	Betsabé Páez (ARG)	1.76 m
Pole vault	Robeilys Peinado (VEN)	4.35 m	Valeria Chiaraviglio (ARG)	4.10 m	Karla Rosa da Silva (BRA)	4.10 m
Long jump	Paola Mautino (PER)	6.52 m w ^{[nb3]}	Tânia da Silva (BRA)	6.37 m w	Yuliana Angulo (ECU)	6.25 m
Triple jump	Yulimar Rojas (VEN)	14.14 m w	Tânia da Silva (BRA)	13.60 m	Giselly Andrea Landázury (COL)	13.35 m
Shot put	Geisa Arcanjo (BRA)	17.76 m	Natalia Duco (CHI)	17.56 m	Ahymará Espinoza (VEN)	17.25 m
Discus throw	Andressa de Morais (BRA)	61.15 m CR	Fernanda Borges Martins (BRA)	58.22 m	Rocío Comba (ARG)	57.15 m
Hammer throw	Rosa Rodríguez (VEN)	71.66 m	Johana Moreno (COL)	66.05 m	Jennifer Dahlgren (ARG)	64.76 m
Javelin throw	Jucilene de Lima (BRA)	60.16 m ^{[nb4]}	Flor Ruiz (COL)	59.86 m	Maria Paz Rios (COL)	51.12 m
Heptathlon	Evelis Aguilar (COL)	5902 pts CR NR	Guillercy González (VEN)	5444 pts	Giovana Cavaleti (BRA)	5426 pts

- ^{nb2} The Peruvian 4 × 400 m relay team (Deysi Lisbeth Parra, Claudia Angelica Meneses Lopez, Jimena Judith Copara Gorvea, Maitte De La Flor Torres Cordova) set a national record of 3:44.44 minutes in fifth place.
- ^{nb3} Peru's women's long jump winner Paola Mautino set a wind-legal national record in the final with a jump of 6.48 m.
- ^{nb4} The winning performance of 60.16 m by Jucilene de Lima in the women's javelin was declared a championship record by CONSUDATLE, but was actually short of Flor Ruiz's mark of 60.23 m set at the 2013 edition.

== Medal table ==
* Host nation (Peru)

Rank	Nation	Gold	Silver	Bronze	Total
1	Brazil	11	15	8	34
2	Colombia	9	6	7	22
3	Venezuela	8	8	6	22
4	Ecuador	4	2	4	10
5	Uruguay	4	0	1	5
6	Peru	3	2	5	10
7	Chile	2	6	4	12
8	Argentina	2	5	5	12
9	Panama	1	0	2	3
10	Bolivia	0	0	1	1
10	Suriname	0	0	1	1
12	Aruba	0	0	0	0
12	Paraguay	0	0	0	0
Totals (13 entries)		44	44	44	132

== Points tables ==
Rank	Nation	Total	Men	Women
1	Brazil	285	121	164
2	Venezuela	228	97	131
3	Colombia	212	112	100
4	Chile	124	64	60
5	Peru	107	57	50
6	Argentina	94	53	41
7	Ecuador	93	60	33
8	Uruguay	52	23	29
9	Panama	28	13	15
10	Paraguay	18	9	9
11	Suriname	11	7	4
12	Bolivia	7	2	5
13	Aruba	0	0	0

== Participation ==
Twelve of the 13 member federations of CONSUDATLE participated at the championships, plus ODESUR member Aruba. Guyana did not compete at this edition, having done so at the 2013 South American Championships in Athletics.

- Argentina (25)
- Aruba (1)
- Bolivia (8)
- Brazil (44)
- Chile (48)
- Colombia (40)
- Ecuador (31)
- Panama (18)
- Paraguay (11)
- Peru (52)
- Suriname (5)
- Uruguay (12)
- Venezuela (38)

== See also ==
- 2015 Asian Athletics Championships
