= Álex Quiñónez =

Ecuadorian sprinter (1989–2021)

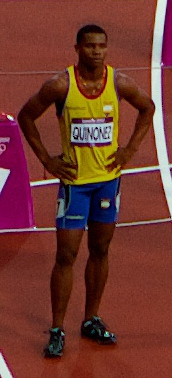
- Quiñónez at the 2012 Summer Olympics

Personal information
- Full name: Alex Leonardo Quiñónez Martínez
- Born: 11 August 1989 Esmeraldas, Esmeraldas, Ecuador
- Died: 22 October 2021 (aged 32) Guayaquil, Guayas, Ecuador
- Height: 1.76 m (5 ft 9 in)
- Weight: 65 kg (143 lb)

Sport
- Country: Ecuador
- Sport: Athletics
- Event: Sprint

Achievements and titles
- Personal bests: 100 m 10.09 (+2.0 m/s) (Medellín 2013); 200 m 19.87 (−0.1 m/s) (Lausanne 2019)
Medal record
Men's athletics
Representing Ecuador
World Championships
Bronze medal – third place	2019 Doha	200 m
Pan American Games
Gold medal – first place	2019 Lima	200 m
Continental Cup
Bronze medal – third place	2018 Ostrava	200 m
South American Championships
Gold medal – first place	2013 Cartagena	100 m
Gold medal – first place	2013 Cartagena	200 m
South American Games
Silver medal – second place	2014 Santiago	100 m
Bronze medal – third place	2014 Santiago	200 m
Ibero-American Championships
Gold medal – first place	2012 Barquisimeto	100 m
Gold medal – first place	2012 Barquisimeto	200 m
Bronze medal – third place	2012 Barquisimeto	4×100 m relay

Álex Leonardo Quiñónez Martínez (11 August 1989 – 22 October 2021) was an Ecuadorian sprinter who competed in the 100 metres and 200 metres. He was shot dead on 22 October 2021 at age 32. He was the second runner to be murdered that month, alongside fellow bronze medalist Agnes Tirop.

He won the 100 m and 200m at the 2012 Ibero-American Championships in Athletics, with his 20.34s national record in the 200 m qualifying him for the 2012 Summer Olympics.

He ran a new Ecuadorian national record of 20.28 s in the heats of the 200 metres at the 2012 Olympics and qualified for the final, where he finished seventh.

Quiñónez won the bronze medal at the 2019 World Championships in the 200 metres event.

He qualified to represent Ecuador at the 2020 Summer Olympics in the 200m in Tokyo but was provisionally suspended for "whereabouts failures" less than a month before the games began.

== Murder ==
Quiñónez was shot and killed on 22 October 2021 in Guayaquil. He was 32 years old.

== Personal bests ==
- 100 m: 10.09 s A NR (wind: +2.0 m/s) – Medellín, Colombia, 25 May 2013
- 200 m: 19.87 s NR (wind: -0.1 m/s) – Lausanne, Switzerland, 5 July 2019
- 400 m: 46.28 s NR – Braga, Portugal, 29 June 2019

== Achievements ==
Year	Competition	Venue	Position	Event	Notes
Representing Ecuador
2006	South American Youth Championships	Caracas, Venezuela	5th (h)	200 m	22.88 (−1.2 m/s)
2006	South American Youth Championships	Caracas, Venezuela	6th (h)	400 m	51.91
2006	South American Youth Championships	Caracas, Venezuela	6th	4 × 100 m relay	43.63
2006	South American Youth Championships	Caracas, Venezuela	4th	1000 m Medley relay	1:59.96
2009	ALBA Games	Havana, Cuba	8th	200 m	22.09 w (+2.3 m/s)
2009	ALBA Games	Havana, Cuba	2nd	4 × 100 m relay	40.67
2011	South American Championships	Buenos Aires, Argentina	11th (h)	200 m	21.57 (+0.7 m/s)
2011	South American Championships	Buenos Aires, Argentina	5th	4 × 100 m relay	41.90
2011	ALBA Games	Barquisimeto, Venezuela	4th	200 m	20.95 w (+2.4 m/s)
2011	ALBA Games	Barquisimeto, Venezuela	3rd	4 × 100 m relay	40.7
2011	ALBA Games	Barquisimeto, Venezuela	4th	4 × 400 m relay	3:10.94
2011	Pan American Games	Guadalajara, Mexico	6th	200 m	20.86 A (−1.0 m/s)
2011	Pan American Games	Guadalajara, Mexico	5th	4 × 100 m relay	39.76 A NR
2012	Ibero-American Championships	Barquisimeto, Venezuela	1st	100 m	10.33 (−0.2 m/s)
2012	Ibero-American Championships	Barquisimeto, Venezuela	1st	200 m	20.34 NR (−0.9 m/s)
2012	Ibero-American Championships	Barquisimeto, Venezuela	3rd	4 × 100 m relay	40.83
2012	Ibero-American Championships	Barquisimeto, Venezuela	5th	4 × 400 m relay	3:09.48
2012	Olympic Games	London, United Kingdom	7th	200 m	20.57 (+0.4 m/s)
2013	South American Championships	Cartagena, Colombia	1st	100 m	10.22 (+1.3 m/s)
2013	South American Championships	Cartagena, Colombia	1st	200 m	20.44 (+1.8 m/s)
2013	South American Championships	Cartagena, Colombia	4th	4 × 100 m relay	40.11
2013	South American Championships	Cartagena, Colombia	4th	4 × 400 m relay	3:15.61
2013	World Championships	Moscow, Russia	44th (h)	100 m	10.50 (−0.4 m/s)
2013	World Championships	Moscow, Russia	15th (sf)	200 m	20.55 (+0.0 m/s)
2013	Bolivarian Games	Trujillo, Peru	1st	100 m	10.52 (−0.3 m/s)
2013	Bolivarian Games	Trujillo, Peru	1st	200 m	20.47 GR(+0.0 m/s)
2013	Bolivarian Games	Trujillo, Peru	2nd	4 × 100 m relay	39.62
2013	Bolivarian Games	Trujillo, Peru	3rd	4 × 400 m relay	3:12.19
2014	South American Games	Santiago, Chile	3rd	100 m	10.39 s (+1.1 m/s)
2014	South American Games	Santiago, Chile	2nd	200 m	20.66 s (−1.0 m/s)
2014	South American Games	Santiago, Chile	5th	4 × 100 m relay	40.41 s
2015	South American Championships	Lima, Peru	2nd	100 m	10.43 (−1.1 m/s)
2015	South American Championships	Lima, Peru	1st	200 m	20.76 (0.0 m/s)
2015	South American Championships	Lima, Peru	1st	4 × 100 m relay	39.94
2015	World Championships	Beijing, China	—	200 m	DQ
2017	South American Championships	Asunción, Paraguay	4th	4 × 100 m relay	40.61
2017	Bolivarian Games	Santa Marta, Colombia	1st	100 m	10.13
2017	Bolivarian Games	Santa Marta, Colombia	1st	200 m	20.27
2017	Bolivarian Games	Santa Marta, Colombia	3rd	4 × 100 m relay	39.83
2017	Bolivarian Games	Santa Marta, Colombia	4th	4 × 400 m relay	3:12.81
2018	South American Games	Cochabamba, Bolivia	2nd	100 m	10.09
2018	South American Games	Cochabamba, Bolivia	1st	200 m	19.93
2019	World Relays	Yokohama, Japan	10th (h)	4 × 200 m relay	1:27.22
2019	Pan American Games	Lima, Peru	1st	200 m	20.27
2019	World Championships	Doha, Qatar	3rd	200 m	19.98
2021	World Relays	Chorzów, Poland	4th	4 × 200 m relay	1:24.89
