= Paola Mautino =

Peruvian athletics competitor

Personal information
- Full name: Paola Mautino Ruiz
- Born: 1 June 1990 (age 36) Lima, Peru
- Height: 1.70 m (5 ft 7 in)
- Weight: 61 kg (134 lb)

Sport
- Country: Peru
- Sport: Track and field
- Event(s): Long jump, 100 m, 200 m
- Updated on 29 August 2015

Paola Mautino Ruiz (born 1 June 1990) is a Peruvian athlete competing in the long jump and sprinting events. She competed at the 2015 World Championships in Beijing without qualifying for the final.

Her personal best in the long jump is 6.66 metres (+1.5 m/s) set in Cochabamba in 2018, which is the current national record.

Her brother Fabrizio Mautino was a sprinter as were their father Giorgio Mautino and uncle Marco Mautino. The latter two were born in Italy and immigrated to Peru at an early age.

== Competition record ==
Year	Competition	Venue	Position	Event	Notes
Representing Peru
2006	South American Youth Championships	Caracas, Venezuela	7th	100 m	12.66 s
2006	South American Youth Championships	Caracas, Venezuela	10th (h)	200 m	25.89 s
2006	South American Youth Championships	Caracas, Venezuela	5th	4 × 100 m relay	48.74 s
2006	South American Youth Championships	Caracas, Venezuela	5th	4 × 400 m relay	2:17.42
2007	South American Junior Championships	São Paulo, Brazil	9th (h)	100 m	12.49 s
2007	South American Junior Championships	São Paulo, Brazil	8th	200 m	25.78 s
2007	World Youth Championships	Ostrava, Czech Republic	59th (h)	100 m	12.96 s
2007	World Youth Championships	Ostrava, Czech Republic	48th (q)	200 m	26.18 s
2008	South American U23 Championships	Lima, Peru	5th	100 m	12.75 s
2008	South American U23 Championships	Lima, Peru	5th	200 m	26.29 s
2008	South American U23 Championships	Lima, Peru	2nd	4 × 100 m relay	48.65 s
2009	South American Championships	Lima, Peru	10th (h)	100 m	12.49 s
2009	South American Championships	Lima, Peru	4th	4 × 100 m relay	48.18 s
2009	South American Junior Championships	São Paulo, Brazil	6th	100 m	12.23 s
2009	South American Junior Championships	São Paulo, Brazil	9th (h)	200 m	25.93 s
2010	South American Games/ South American U23 Championships	Medellín, Colombia	7th	100 m	12.35 s
2010	South American Games/ South American U23 Championships	Medellín, Colombia	9th (h)	200 m	25.65 s
2012	South American U23 Championships	São Paulo, Brazil	6th	100 m	12.35 s
2012	South American U23 Championships	São Paulo, Brazil	7th	Long jump	5.51 m
2013	South American Championships	Cartagena, Colombia	9th (h)	100 m	12.47 s
2013	South American Championships	Cartagena, Colombia	12th (h)	200 m	25.51 s
2013	South American Championships	Cartagena, Colombia	8th	Long jump	6.13 m
2013	Bolivarian Games	Trujillo, Peru	8th (h)	100 m	12.24 s
2013	Bolivarian Games	Trujillo, Peru	7th (h)	200 m	25.48 s
2013	Bolivarian Games	Trujillo, Peru	5th	4 × 100 m relay	46.67 s
2013	Bolivarian Games	Trujillo, Peru	1st	Long jump	6.32 m
2014	Ibero-American Championships	São Paulo, Brazil	9th (h)	200 m	25.66 s
2014	Ibero-American Championships	São Paulo, Brazil	–	4 × 100 m relay	DQ
2014	Ibero-American Championships	São Paulo, Brazil	5th	Long jump	6.04 m
2015	South American Championships	Lima, Peru	5th	4 × 100 m relay	46.71 s
2015	South American Championships	Lima, Peru	1st	Long jump	6.52 m (w)
2015	Pan American Games	Toronto, Canada	12th	Long jump	6.35 m
2015	World Championships	Beijing, China	29th (q)	Long jump	6.15 m
2016	Ibero-American Championships	Rio de Janeiro, Brazil	3rd	Long jump	6.18 m
2017	South American Championships	Asunción, Paraguay	6th	4 × 100 m relay	46.43 s
2017	South American Championships	Asunción, Paraguay	5th	Long jump	6.31 m (w)
2017	Bolivarian Games	Santa Marta, Colombia	4th	4 × 100 m relay	46.28 s
2017	Bolivarian Games	Santa Marta, Colombia	3rd	Long jump	6.25 m
2018	South American Games	Cochabamba, Bolivia	9th (h)	100 m	11.76 s
2018	South American Games	Cochabamba, Bolivia	3rd	4 × 100 m relay	46.43 s
2018	South American Games	Cochabamba, Bolivia	1st	Long jump	6.66 m
2018	Ibero-American Championships	Trujillo, Peru	1st	4 × 100 m relay	46.76
2018	Ibero-American Championships	Trujillo, Peru	4th	Long jump	6.49 m (w)
2019	South American Championships	Lima, Peru	5th	4 × 100 m relay	46.60
2019	South American Championships	Lima, Peru	6th	Long jump	6.16 m
2019	Pan American Games	Lima, Peru	–	4 × 100 m relay	DNF
2019	Pan American Games	Lima, Peru	9th	Long jump	6.30 m
2021	South American Championships	Guayaquil, Ecuador	5th	Long jump	6.32 m
2024	South American Indoor Championships	Cochabamba, Bolivia	6th	Long jump	5.91 m
2024	Ibero-American Championships	Cuiabá, Brazil	8th	Long jump	5.89 m
2025	Bolivarian Games	Lima, Peru	5th	Long jump	5.94 m

== Personal bests ==
- 100 metres – 11.76 (-1.5 m/s, Cochabamba 2018)
- 200 metres – 25.21 (0.0 m/s, Cochabamba 2010)
- Long jump – 6.66 (+1.5 m/s, Cochabamba 2018)
