= Arley Ibargüen =

Colombian javelin thrower (born 1982)

Personal information
- Full name: Arley Ibargüen Ibargüen
- Born: 4 October 1982 (age 43) Apartadó, Antioquia, Colombia
- Height: 1.83 m (6 ft 0 in)
- Weight: 84 kg (185 lb)

Sport
- Country: Colombia
- Sport: Athletics
- Updated on 27 December 2014

Arley Ibargüen (born 4 October 1982) is a Colombian javelin thrower.

== Personal best ==
- Javelin throw: 81.23 m – Medellín, Colombia, 23 April 2016

== Competition record ==
Year	Competition	Venue	Position	Notes
Representing Colombia
2004	South American U23 Championships	Barquisimeto, Venezuela	3rd	70.05 m
2006	South American Championships	Tunja, Colombia	8th	68.70 m A
2007	ALBA Games	Caracas, Venezuela	3rd	76.97 m
2007	South American Championships	São Paulo, Brazil	4th	72.11 m
2009	South American Championships	Lima, Peru	1st	81.07 m (NR)
2009	Central American and Caribbean Championships	Havana, Cuba	3rd	75.16 m
2009	World Championships	Berlin, Germany	37th (q)	72.54 m
2010	Central American and Caribbean Games	Mayagüez, Puerto Rico	1st	78.93 m
2011	South American Championships	Buenos Aires, Argentina	1st	73.61 m
2011	Central American and Caribbean Championships	Mayagüez, Puerto Rico	2nd	75.71 m
2011	World Championships	Daegu, South Korea	27th (q)	74.02 m
2011	Pan American Games	Guadalajara, Mexico	10th	72.93 m
2012	Ibero-American Championships	Barquisimeto, Venezuela	2nd	76.48 m
2013	South American Championships	Cartagena, Colombia	2nd	76.13 m
2013	Bolivarian Games	Trujillo, Peru	3rd	71.78 m
2014	South American Games	Santiago, Chile	4th	74.25 m
2014	Pan American Sports Festival	Mexico City, Mexico	11th	67.30 m A
2014	Central American and Caribbean Games	Xalapa, Mexico	5th	75.56 m A
2015	South American Championships	Lima, Peru	3rd	75.47 m
2016	Ibero-American Championships	Rio de Janeiro, Brazil	1st	80.28 m
2017	South American Championships	Asunción, Paraguay	2nd	75.97 m
2017	Bolivarian Games	Santa Marta, Colombia	1st	78.87 m
2018	South American Games	Cochabamba, Bolivia	1st	80.11 m
2018	Central American and Caribbean Games	Barranquilla, Colombia	5th	74.57 m
2018	Ibero-American Championships	Trujillo, Peru	1st	75.50 m
2019	South American Championships	Lima, Peru	3rd	75.83 m
2019	Pan American Games	Lima, Peru	7th	74.85 m
2021	South American Championships	Guayaquil, Ecuador	1st	75.62 m
2022	Bolivarian Games	Valledupar, Colombia	3rd	73.21 m
