= Ingrid Hernández =

Colombian race walker (born 1988)

Personal information
- Full name: Ingrid Johana Hernández Castillo
- Nationality: Colombia
- Born: 29 November 1988 (age 37) Bogotá, Colombia
- Height: 1.66 m (5 ft 5 in)
- Weight: 50 kg (110 lb)

Sport
- Sport: Athletics
- Event: Racewalking
Medal record
Representing Colombia
Pan American Games
Bronze medal – third place	2011 Guadalajara	20km walk
Central American and Caribbean Games
Silver medal – second place	2014 Xalapa	20km walk
South American Games
Gold medal – first place	2010 Medellin	20km walk
- Updated on 5 January 2015

Ingrid Johana Hernández Castillo (born 29 November 1988 in Bogotá) is a Colombian race walker.

== Career ==
She competed in the 20 km kilometres event at the 2012 Summer Olympics.

== Personal bests ==
Event	Result	Venue	Date
Road walk
10 km	45:45 min	(United Kingdom) London	11 Aug 2012
20 km	1:31:02 hrs	(United States) Valley Cottage, New York	14 Sep 2014
Track walk
10,000 m	45:25.06 min	(Brazil) São Paulo	1 Aug 2014
20,000 m	1:32:09.4 hrs (ht)	(Argentina) Buenos Aires	5 Jun 2011

== Achievements ==
Year	Competition	Venue	Position	Event	Notes
Representing Colombia
2004	South American Race Walking Championships (U18)	Los Ángeles, Bío Bío, Chile	—	5 km	DQ
2004	South American Youth Championships	Guayaquil, Ecuador	2nd	5000 m track walk	25:06.4
2005	South American Junior Championships	Rosario, Argentina	1st	10,000m track walk	49:49.64
2006	South American Race Walking Championships (U20)	Cochabamba, Bolivia	1st	10 km walk	52:19 A
2006	South American Race Walking Championships (U20)	Cochabamba, Bolivia	1st	Team (10 km)	7 pts
2006	World Race Walking Cup (U20)	A Coruña, Spain	12th	10 km walk	49:50
2006	World Race Walking Cup (U20)	A Coruña, Spain	5th	Team (10 km)	25 pts
2006	World Junior Championships	Beijing, China	14th	10,000m track walk	52:37.36
2007	Pan American Race Walking Cup (U20)	Balneário Camboriú, Brazil	4th	10 km walk	52:25
2007	Pan American Race Walking Cup (U20)	Balneário Camboriú, Brazil	2nd	Team (10 km)	6 pts
2007	South American Junior Championships	São Paulo, Brazil	1st	10,000m track walk	48.48.24
2007	Pan American Junior Championships	São Paulo, Brazil	1st	10,000m track walk	48.48.24
2008	Central American and Caribbean Championships	Cali, Colombia	3rd	10,000m track walk	52:44.84 A
2008	South American Under-23 Championships	Lima, Peru	3rd	20,000m track walk	1:41:49.0 (ht) A
2010	South American Games	Medellín, Colombia	1st	20,000m track walk	1:42:55.9 (ht)
2010	South American Under-23 Championships	Medellín, Colombia	1st	20,000m track walk	1:42:55.9 (ht)
2010	World Race Walking Cup	Chihuahua, Mexico	37th	20 km walk	1:44:38
2011	Pan American Race Walking Cup	Medellín, Colombia	3rd	20 km walk	1:37:18
2011	Pan American Race Walking Cup	Medellín, Colombia	1st	Team (20 km)	10 pts
2011	South American Championships	Buenos Aires, Argentina	1st	20,000m track walk	1:32:09.4 (ht)
2011	World Championships	Daegu, South Korea	33rd	20 km walk	1:39:53
2011	Pan American Games	Guadalajara, Mexico	3rd	20 km walk	1:34:06 A
2012	South American Race Walking Championships	Salinas, Ecuador	2nd	20 km walk	1:34:55.5
2012	South American Race Walking Championships	Salinas, Ecuador	1st	Team (20 km)	9 pts
2012	World Race Walking Cup	Saransk, Russia	28th	20 km walk	1:35:43
2012	World Race Walking Cup	Saransk, Russia	8th	Team (20 km)	101 pts
2012	Ibero-American Championships	Barquisimeto, Venezuela	2nd	10,000m track walk	46:48.80
2012	Olympic Games	London, United Kingdom	34th	20 km walk	1:33:34
2014	Ibero-American Championships	São Paulo, Brazil	6th	10,000m track walk	45:25.06
2014	Central American and Caribbean Games	Xalapa, Mexico	3rd	20 km walk	1:37:11 A
2015	South American Championships	Lima, Peru	2nd	20,000m walk	1:36:42.1
