= Athletics at the 2010 South American Games – Women's 100 metres =

The Women's 100m event at the 2010 South American Games was held on March 20, with the heats at 11:50 and the Final at 19:30.

== Medalists ==
Gold	Silver	Bronze
Ana Claudia Silva; Brazil	Yomara Hinestroza; Colombia	Nelcy Caicedo; Colombia

== Records ==
Standing records prior to the 2010 South American Games
World record	Florence Griffith-Joyner	United States	10.49	Indianapolis, United States	16 July 1988
World Leading	Sally McLellan	Australia	11.39	Sydney, Australia	27 February 2010
South American record	Lucimar Aparecida de Moura	Brazil	11.17	Bogotá, Colombia	25 June 1999<
South American record	Lucimar Aparecida de Moura	Brazil	11.17	Bogotá, Colombia	25 June 1999
South American U23 record	Felipa Alicia Palacios	Colombia	11.31	Havana, Cuba	16 May 1997

== Results ==
Results were published.

=== Heats ===
==== Heat 1 ====
Rank	Athlete	Nationality	Reaction	Result	Notes
1	Ana Cláudia Silva	Brazil	0.179	11.17 Q	=AR, SUR, WL
2	Nelcy Caicedo	Colombia	0.194	11.53 Q	PB
3	Érika Chávez	Ecuador	0.225	11.64 Q	SB
4	Macarena Borie	Chile	0.170	12.21 q	SB
5	Constanza Eckhardt	Argentina	0.213	12.36 q	
			Wind: +1.4 m/s		

==== Heat 2 ====
Rank	Athlete	Nationality	Reaction	Result	Notes
1	Yomara Hinestroza	Colombia	0.209	11.64 Q	
2	Franciela Krasucki	Brazil	0.167	12.00 Q	
3	Paola Mautino	(Peru) Perú	0.230	12.23 Q	
4	Anneliese Grosser	Chile	0.194	12.40	
			Wind: +0.6 m/s		

=== Final ===
Rank	Athlete	Nationality	Reaction	Result	Notes
1st place, gold medalist(s)	Ana Claudia Silva	Brazil	0.172	11.33	
2nd place, silver medalist(s)	Yomara Hinestroza	Colombia	0.205	11.63	
3rd place, bronze medalist(s)	Nelcy Caicedo	Colombia	0.190	11.70	
4	Érika Chávez	Ecuador	0.206	11.80	
5	Franciela Krasucki	Brazil	0.169	12.27	
6	Constanza Eckhardt	Argentina	0.203	12.32	
7	Paola Mautino	(Peru) Perú	0.225	12.35	
8	Macarena Borie	Chile	0.200	12.37	
			Wind: +1.5 m/s		

== See also ==
- 2010 South American Under-23 Championships in Athletics
