= Carolina Tabares =

Colombian long-distance runner

Personal information
- Full name: Carolina Tabares Guerrero
- Born: 18 June 1986 (age 40)

Sport
- Sport: Athletics
- Event(s): 5000 m, 10,000 m

Carolina Tabares Guerrero (born 18 June 1986) is a Colombian long-distance runner. She represented her country in the 5000 metres at the 2013 World Championships without advancing to the final.

== International competitions ==
Year	Competition	Venue	Position	Event	Notes
Representing Colombia
2008	Central American and Caribbean Championships	Cali, Colombia	4th	5000 m	16:55.46
2013	South American Championships	Cartagena, Colombia	1st	5000 m	16:09.82
2013	South American Championships	Cartagena, Colombia	2nd	10,000 m	34:47.59
2013	World Championships	Moscow, Russia	20th (h)	5000 m	16:22.81
2013	Bolivarian Games	Trujillo, Peru	2nd	5000 m	15:35.30
2013	Bolivarian Games	Trujillo, Peru	3rd	10,000 m	34:14.5
2015	South American Championships	Lima, Peru	3rd	5000 m	15:59.28
2015	South American Championships	Lima, Peru	4th	10,000 m	33:12.72
2015	Pan American Games	Toronto, Canada	9th	5000 m	16:17.62
2015	Pan American Games	Toronto, Canada	10th	10,000 m	33:42.54
2017	Bolivarian Games	Santa Marta, Colombia	6th	5000 m	16:36.41
2017	Bolivarian Games	Santa Marta, Colombia	7th	10,000 m	35:38.08
2018	Central American and Caribbean Games	Barranquilla, Colombia	4th	5000 m	16:26.06
2018	Central American and Caribbean Games	Barranquilla, Colombia	4th	10,000 m	34:21.05
2019	South American Championships	Lima, Peru	2nd	5000 m	15:46.04
2019	South American Championships	Lima, Peru	1st	10,000 m	33:36.77
2019	Pan American Games	Lima, Peru	5th	5000 m	15:43.83
2019	Pan American Games	Lima, Peru	5th	10,000 m	32:25.19
2021	South American Championships	Guayaquil, Ecuador	4th	5000 m	15:55.39

== Personal bests ==
Outdoor

- 1500 metres – 4:28.66 (Ponce 2009)
- 3000 metres – 9:41.49 (Carolina 2008)
- 5000 metres – 15:35.30 (Trujillo 2013)
- 10,000 metres – 32:19.59 (Palo Alto 2019) NR
- 10 kilometres – 33:45 (Girardot 2017)
- 15 kilometres – 54:15 (Bogotá 2018)
- Half marathon – 1:16:21 (Coamo 2010)
