= Adelly Santos =

Brazilian hurdler

Personal information
- Nickname: Duda
- Born: 8 July 1987 (age 38) Londrina, Brazil
- Height: 1.76 m (5 ft 9 in)
- Weight: 68 kg (150 lb)

Sport
- Sport: Track and field
- Event: 100 metres hurdles
- Club: Clube Atletismo BM&FBovespa
- Coached by: Katsuhico Nakaya

Adelly Oliveira Santos (born 8 July 1987 in Londrina) is a Brazilian athlete specialising in the 100 metres hurdles. She represented her country at the 2015 World Championships without advancing from the heats.

Her personal best in the event is 13.06 seconds set in São Bernardo do Campo in 2015.

== Competition record ==
Year	Competition	Venue	Position	Event	Notes
Representing Brazil
2015	South American Championships	Lima, Peru	3rd	100 m hurdles	13.53
2015	South American Championships	Lima, Peru	2nd	4 × 100 m relay	44.43
2015	Pan American Games	Toronto, Ontario, Canada	8th (h)	100 m hurdles	13.08 (w)
2015	World Championships	Beijing, China	30th (h)	100 m hurdles	13.29
2019	South American Championships	Lima, Peru	3rd	100 m hurdles	13.64
