= Ifrish Alberg =

Surinamese sprinter

Personal information
- Nationality: Surinamese
- Born: 13 July 1988 (age 37)

Sport
- Sport: Track and field
- Event: 100m
Medal record
Representing Suriname
Men's athletics
South American Championships
Bronze medal – third place	2015 Lima	100 m

Ifrish Alberg (born 13 July 1988) is a Surinamese sprinter. He competed in the 100 metres event at the 2013 World Championships in Athletics. He is the former national record holder in the 100 metres.

In March 2013 he broke the national record of 100 metres with a time of 10.31 seconds, 0,01 second fasther than the previous record of 10.32 seconds by Sammy Monsels. However, according to Ricky Stutgard it is not clear he broke national record, as some sources and books indicated Monsels ran 10.22 seconds at the time. When asked, Monselsbelieved his national record had been broken. Later in May 2013, Alberg improved his own national record to 10.29 seconds.

Alberg is also the national record holder in the 4 × 100 m relay and in the 55 metres indoor (6.33 seconds).

In August 2013 in the 100 metres event at the 2013 World Championships in Athletics, he qualified in the heats for the first round, but in round one he stumbled at the start and did not finish.
