= Yuliana Angulo =

Ecuadorian sprinter (born 1994)

Personal information
- Full name: Yuliana Elizabeth Angulo Jama
- Born: 6 July 1994 (age 31) Santo Domingo, Ecuador
- Height: 1.68 m (5 ft 6 in)
- Weight: 56 kg (123 lb)

Sport
- Sport: Athletics
- Event(s): 100 m, Long jump

Yuliana Elizabeth Angulo Jama (born 6 July 1994) is an Ecuadorian sprinter. She competed in the women's 4 × 100 metres relay at the 2017 World Championships in Athletics. She competed at the 2020 Summer Olympics.
