= Jeffrey Vanan =

Surinamese sprinter

Personal information
- Born: 21 December 1992 (age 33)

Sport
- Country: Suriname
- Sport: Track and field
- Events: 100 metres, 200 metres

Danny Jeffrey Vanan (born 21 December 1992) is a Surinamese sprinter. He competed in the 100 metres event at the 2015 World Championships in Athletics in Beijing, China.
