= Isidora Jiménez =

Chilean sprinter (born 1993)

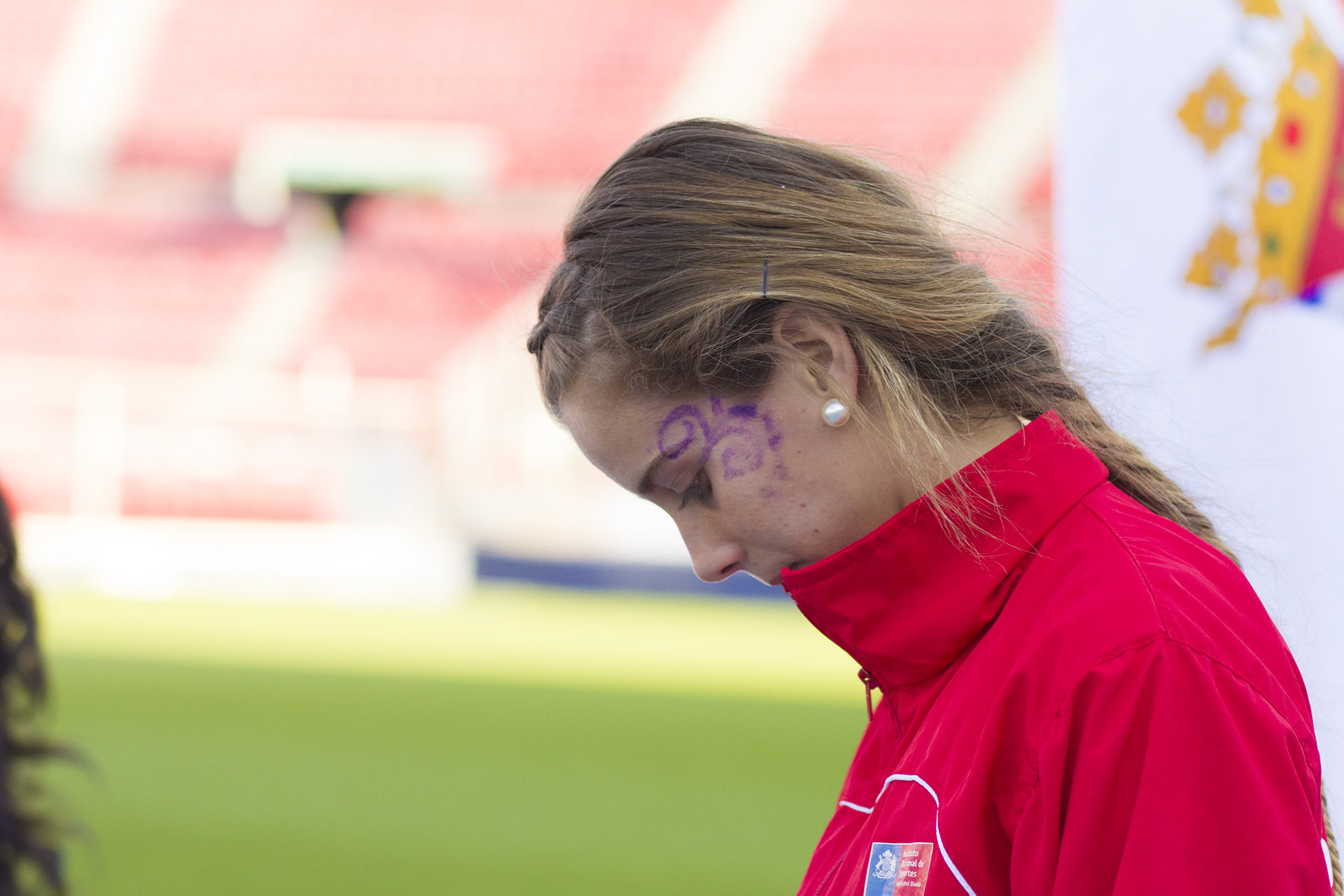

Personal information
- Full name: Isidora Andrea Jiménez Ibacache
- Nickname: Isi
- Born: August 10, 1993 (age 33) Concepción, Chile
- Height: 1.70 m (5 ft 7 in)
- Weight: 56 kg (123 lb)

Sport
- Country: Chile
- Sport: Athletics
- Coached by: Carlos Moreno

Achievements and titles
- National finals: National Titles; 100m (2023); 200m (2021); 200m (2018); 100m (2018); 100m (2015)
Medal record
Women's athletics
Representing Chile
Pan American Games
Silver medal – second place	2023 Santiago	4×100 m relay
South American Games
Silver medal – second place	2022 Asunción	4×100 m relay
South American Championships
Bronze medal – third place	2023 São Paulo	4×100 m relay
Bronze medal – third place	2011 Buenos Aires	4×100 m relay
Bronze medal – third place	2011 Buenos Aires	4×400 m relay
- Updated on 16 June 2024

Isidora Andrea Jiménez Ibacache (born 10 August 1993) is a Chilean athlete specializing in the sprinting and Relay race events.

She won a public vote, and thus was named the flagbearer of Chile at the 2015 Pan American Games opening ceremony.

== National records ==
Category	Event	Time	Date	Venue
Senior
Sprints	60 metres (i)	7,29	3 February 2018	São Caetano do Sul, Brazil
Sprints	100 metres	11,19 (-1,9 m/s)	6 June 2018	Cochabamba, Bolivia
Sprints	200 metres	22,95 (+1,2 m/s)	23 July 2015	Toronto, Canada
Relay race	4 × 100 metres relay	44,19	20 November 2023	Santiago, Chile
Relay race	4 × 400 metres relay	3:37,42	11 May 2019	Yokohama, Japan
Youth
Sprints	100 metres	11,75 (+1,0 m/s)	27 June 2012	(Brazil) São Paulo, Brasil
Sprints	200 metres	23,42 (-1,5 m/s)	12 July 2012	Barcelona, Spain
Sprints	400 metres	54,80	20 October 2012	Santiago, Chile
Junior
Sprints	200 metres	24,30 (+0,5 m/s)	10 October 2010	Santiago, Chile
