= List of Argentine records in athletics =

The following are the national records in athletics in Argentina maintained by its national athletics federation: Argentine Athletics Confederation (CADA).

== Outdoor ==
Key to tables: Awaiting ratification Record not kept by CADA Not ratified or later rescinded by CADA

=== Men ===
Event	Record	Athlete	Date	Meet	Place	Ref.
100 m	10.11 (+0.5 m/s)	Franco Florio	29 September 2022	South American Under-23 Championships	Cascavel, Brazil	
100 m	10.1 h (+1.3 m/s)	Carlos Gats	1 October 1994		Buenos Aires, Argentina	
200 m	20.37 (+0.7 m/s)	Carlos Gats	18 July 1998	Ibero-American Championships	Lisbon, Portugal	
300 m	33.46	Augustín Coronel	28 September 2023		Mar del Plata, Argentina	
400 m	44.53	Elián Larregina	19 July 2025	Meeting de Atletismo Madrid	Madrid, Spain	
800 m	1:46.01	Luis Migueles	14 June 1986		Bratislava, Czechoslovakia	
1000 m	2:21.9 h	Luis Migueles	7 May 1986		Prague, Czechoslovakia	
1500 m	3:36.18	Federico Bruno	29 June 2021	VIII Trofeo Diputacion de Castellón (Memorial José Antonio Cansino)	Castellón de la Plana, Spain	
Mile	3:59.27	Federico Bruno	31 March 2021		Concordia, Argentina	
2000 m	5:07.94	Javier Carriqueo	15 March 2008		Mar del Plata, Argentina	
3000 m	7:49.54	Javier Carriqueo	4 August 2009		Mataró, Spain	
5000 m	13:11.57	Federico Bruno	21 April 2023	Payton Jordan Invitational	Palo Alto, United States	
10,000 m	27:38.72	Antonio Silio	26 September 1993	Memorial Van Damme	Brussels, Belgium	
10 km (road)	27:51	Antonio Silio	19 August 1990		Copenhagen, Denmark	
15,000 m (track)	45:37.0+	Pablo Toledo	17 June 2023		Buenos Aires, Argentina	
15 km (road)	43:28	Antonio Silio	28 September 1993		Tampa, United States	
15 km (road)	42:59	Antonio Silio	27 September 1998	World Half Marathon Championships	Uster, Switzerland	
10 miles (track)	49:02.0	Pablo Toledo	17 June 2023		Buenos Aires, Argentina	
10 miles (road)	48:55	Carlos Paradelo	6 September 1999		Park Forest, United States	
One hour	19655 m+	Joaquin Arbe	18 June 2022		Buenos Aires, Argentina	
20,000 m (track)	1:01:06.5	Joaquin Arbe	18 June 2022		Buenos Aires, Argentina	
20 km (road)	57:28	Antonio Silio	27 September 1998	World Half Marathon Championships	Uster, Switzerland	
Half marathon	1:00:45	Antonio Silio	27 September 1998	World Half Marathon Championships	Uster, Switzerland	
25 km (road)	1:16:06+	Eulalio Muñoz	24 September 2023	Berlin Marathon	Berlin, Germany	
30 km (road)	1:31:30	Antonio Silio	3 March 1996		Ōtsu, Japan	
Marathon	2:09:36	Joaquín Arbe	5 December 2021	Valencia Marathon	Valencia, Spain	
110 m hurdles	13.74 (+1.8 m/s)	Agustín Carrera	26 January 2014	Pre Odesur I	Buenos Aires, Argentina	
110 m hurdles	13.74 (−1.5 m/s)	Agustín Carrera	2 August 2014	Ibero-American Championships	São Paulo, Brazil	
400 m hurdles	49.28 A	Guillermo Ruggeri	7 June 2018	South American Games	Cochabamba, Bolivia	
2000 m steeplechase	5:25.69	Marcelo Cascabelo	17 June 1992		Verona, Italy	
3000 m steeplechase	8:25.63	Marcelo Cascabelo	4 June 1989		Belgrade, Yugoslavia	
High jump	2.25 m A	Fernando Pastoriza	23 July 1988		Mexico City, Mexico	
High jump	2.25 m	Erasmo Jara	11 May 2002		Rosario, Argentina	
High jump	2.25 m A	Carlos Layoy	6 June 2018	South American Games	Cochabamba, Bolivia	
Pole vault	5.75 m	Germán Chiaraviglio	21 July 2015	Pan American Games	Toronto, Canada	
Long jump	7.77 m (+0.9 m/s)	Eric Kerwitz	6 December 2003		Rosario, Argentina	
Triple jump	16.62 m A (+0.3 m/s)	Maximiliano Díaz	1 June 2024		Salta, Argentina	
Shot put	21.26 m	Germán Lauro	10 May 2013	Qatar Athletic Super Grand Prix	Doha, Qatar	
Discus throw	66.32 m	Jorge Balliengo	15 April 2006		Rosario, Argentina	
Hammer throw	77.69 m	Joaquín Gómez	25 April 2025	South American Championships	Mar del Plata, Argentina	
Javelin throw	83.32 m	Braian Toledo	24 August 2015	World Championships	Beijing, China	
Decathlon	8291 pts h A	Tito Steiner	22–23 June 1983		Provo, United States	
Decathlon	100m (wind) / Long jump (wind) / Shot put / High jump / 400m / 110m H (wind) / Discus / Pole vault / Javelin / 1500m; 10.8 / 7.45 m / 16.35 m / 2.04 m / 49.0 / 14.1 / 50.02 m / 4.56 m / 61.50 m / 4:51.6					
Decathlon	8304 pts (Note: wind-assisted under the rules of the day)	Tito Steiner	2–3 June 1981		Baton Rouge, United States	
Decathlon	100m (wind) / Long jump (wind) / Shot put / High jump / 400m / 110m H (wind) / Discus / Pole vault / Javelin / 1500m					
Decathlon	8105 pts	Tito Steiner	4–5 April 1979	Texas Relays	Austin, United States	
Decathlon	100m (wind) / Long jump (wind) / Shot put / High jump / 400m / 110m H (wind) / Discus / Pole vault / Javelin / 1500m; 11.26 / 7.09 m / 15.90 m / 2.02 m / 49.57 / 14.98 / 44.54 m / 4.51 m / 65.36 m / 4:26.7					
10,000 m walk (track)	40:05.03	Juan Manuel Cano	20 June 2014		Rosario, Argentina	
10 km walk (road)	40:35+	Juan Manuel Cano	4 August 2012	Olympic Games	London, Great Britain	
20,000 m walk (track)	1:22:18.5	Juan Manuel Cano	25 January 2014		Buenos Aires, Argentina	
20 km walk (road)	1:22:10	Juan Manuel Cano	4 August 2012	Olympic Games	London, Great Britain	
35 km walk (road)	2:39:56	Juan Manuel Cano	14 October 2022		Asunción, Paraguay	
50,000 m walk (track)	4:14:28.5 (Note: road race performance by World Athletics source)	Jorge Loréfice; Benjamín Loréfice	9 May 1993		Buenos Aires, Argentina	
50 km walk (road)	4:17:03	Jorge Loréfice; Benjamín Loréfice	3 November 1991		Mar del Plata, Argentina	
4 × 100 m relay	39.38	Argentina; Lucas Adrián Villegas; Juan Ignacio Ciampitti; Tomás Ariel Villegas; Daniel Rodrigo Londero	25 October 2025	Grand Prix Sudamericano	Asunción, Paraguay	
4 × 200 m relay	1:28.6 h	Argentina; Enrique Alberto Kistenmacher; Jaime Itlman; Fernando Mata; Fernando Lapuente	16 May 1948		Buenos Aires, Argentina	
4 × 400 m relay	3:04.39	Argentina; Pedro Emmert; Bruno de Genaro; Matias Falchetti; Elián Larregina	1 October 2022	South American U23 Championships	Cascavel, Brazil	
4 × 800 m relay	7:50.4	Argentina; Franco Dallamora; Guillermo Piccioni; Alberto Cavanna; Carlos Mathon	1 December 1972		Buenos Aires, Argentina	
4 × 1500 m relay	15:49.0	Combined team Oscar Cortinez; Alejandro Torres; Leonardo Malgor; Damián Pérez	11 September 1993		Buenos Aires, Argentina	

=== Women ===
Event	Record	Athlete	Date	Meet	Place	Ref.
100 m	11.40 A (+1.7 m/s)	María Victoria Woodward	13 May 2018	Grand Prix Sudamericano "Julia Iriarte"	Cochabamba, Bolivia	
100 m	11.3 h NWI	Ana Comaschi	2 December 1989		Montevideo, Uruguay	
100 m	11.17 (+1.1 m/s)	María Victoria Woodward	26 April 2019		Concepción del Uruguay, Argentina	
200 m	22.94 A NWI	Beatriz Allocco	11 November 1978	Southern Cross Games	La Paz, Bolivia	
400 m	52.50	Olga Conte	22 March 1997		Buenos Aires, Argentina	
400 m	52.2 h	Olga Conte	5 May 1990		Santa Fe, Argentina	
400 m	52.2 h	Olga Conte	22 March 1997		Santa Fe, Argentina	
800 m	2:02.75	Martina Escudero	22 June 2024	VIII Ordizia Meeting - International Meeting Jose Antonio Peña	Ordizia, Spain	
1000 m	2:43.61	Mariana Borelli	20 November 2021		Mar del Plata, Argentina	
1500 m	4:05.50	Micaela Levaggi	4 July 2026	X Ordizia Meeting - International Meeting Jose Antonio Peña	Ordizia, Spain	
Mile	4:37.14	Mariana Borelli	15 May 2021		Mar del Plata, Argentina	
Mile (road)	4:40.0 h	Belén Casetta	16 December 2017		Buenos Aires, Argentina	
3000 m	8:53.89	Florencia Borelli	29 July 2022	Murphey Classic	Memphis, United States	
5000 m	15:23.83	Florencia Borelli	3 June 2022	BoXX United Manchester World Athletics Continental Tour	Manchester, United Kingdom	
5 km (road)	15:42+ Mx	Florencia Borelli	19 November 2023	Flanigan’s Seafood Bar & Grill 10K	Miramar, United States	
10,000 m	31:33.07	Florencia Borelli	16 March 2024	The TEN	San Juan Capistrano, United States	
10 km (road)	31:50 Mx	Florencia Borelli	7 March 2026	II 10K Internacional de Bilbao	Bilbao, Spain	
15,000 m (track)	53:43.0+	Chiara Mainetti	18 June 2022		Buenos Aires, Argentina	
15 km (road)	48:55+ Wo	Florencia Borelli	21 August 2022	South American Half Marathon Championships	Buenos Aires, Argentina	
10 miles (track)	57:34.0+	Chiara Mainetti	18 June 2022		Buenos Aires, Argentina	
10 miles (road)	56:55	Griselda González	12 October 1997		Newry, United Kingdom	
One hour (track)	16.795 m+	Chiara Mainetti	18 June 2022		Buenos Aires, Argentina	
20,000 m (track)	1:11:17.6	Chiara Mainetti	18 June 2022		Buenos Aires, Argentina	
20 km (road)	1:05:39+ Mx	Florencia Borelli	27 August 2023	21K Buenos Aires Ñandú	Buenos Aires, Argentina	
Half marathon	1:09:28 Mx	Florencia Borelli	27 August 2023	21K Buenos Aires Ñandú	Buenos Aires, Argentina	
25 km (road)	1:24:56+	Florencia Borelli	18 February 2024	Seville Marathon	Seville, Spain	
30 km (road)	1:41:42+	Florencia Borelli	18 February 2024	Seville Marathon	Seville, Spain	
Marathon	2:24:18	Florencia Borelli	18 February 2024	Seville Marathon	Seville, Spain	
100 m hurdles	13.28 (+1.2 m/s)	Verónica Depaoli	30 July 1999	Pan American Games	Winnipeg, Canada	
100 m hurdles	13.2 h (−0.3 m/s)	Beatriz Capotosto	2 October 1983		Santa Fe, Argentina	
400 m hurdles	55.88	Fiorella Chiappe	8 July 2018	Belgian Championships	Brussels, Belgium	
2000 m steeplechase	6:14.28	Belén Casetta	2 April 2022	GPS Luis Brunetto	Concepción del Uruguay, Argentina	
3000 m steeplechase	9:25.99	Belén Casetta	11 August 2017	World Championships	London, United Kingdom	
High jump	1.96 m	Solange Witteveen	8 September 1997		Oristano, Italy	
High jump	1.97 m X	Solange Witteveen	19 May 2001	South American Championships	Manaus, Brazil	
Pole vault	4.43 m	Alejandra García	3 April 2004		Santa Fe, Argentina	
Long jump	6.61 m (+1.5 m/s)	Andrea Ávila	23 May 1993		Buenos Aires, Argentina	
Long jump	6.61 m (+2.0 m/s)	Andrea Ávila	10 April 1999		Mar del Plata, Argentina	
Triple jump	13.91 m (+1.3 m/s)	Andrea Ávila	3 July 1993	South American Championships	Lima, Peru	
Shot put	16.59 m	Rocío Comba	22 July 2006		São Caetano do Sul, Brazil	
Discus throw	62.77 m	Rocío Comba	12 May 2013	Grande Prêmio Brasil Caixa	Belém, Brazil	
Hammer throw	73.74 m	Jennifer Dahlgren	10 April 2010		Buenos Aires, Argentina	
Javelin throw	56.18 m	Romina Maggi	14 April 2004		Rosario, Argentina	
Weight throw	22.48 m	Jennifer Dahlgren	5 February 2006		Gainesville, United States	
Heptathlon	5815 pts	Fiorella Chiappe	4–5 March 2017	Combined Events Club Championships	Buenos Aires, Argentina	
Heptathlon	100m H (wind) / High jump / Shot put / 200m (wind) / Long jump (wind) / Javelin / 800m; 13.72 (+0.2 m/s) / 1.76 m / 11.33 m / 24.70 (+2.7 m/s) / 6.25 m (+0.5 m/s) / 33.41 m / 2:16.68					
Decathlon	6570 pts	Andrea Bordalejo	27–28 November 2004		Rosario, Argentina	
Decathlon	100m (wind) / Discus / Pole vault / Javelin / 400m / 100m H (wind) / Long jump (wind) / Shot put / High jump / 1500m					
5000 m walk (track)	23:47.84	Marcia Irastorza	29 April 2012		Asunción, Paraguay	
5 km walk (road)	25:29	Renata Zanatta	22 April 2023	Argentinian U18 Race Walking Championships	Mar del Plata, Argentina	
10,000 m walk (track)	49:58.17	Brenda Rocío Palma	2 November 2018		Mar del Plata, Argentina	
10 km walk (road)	51:34	Lidia Ojeda de Carriego	8 December 1990		Buenos Aires, Argentina	
20,000 m walk (track)	1:46:31.7 h	Daiana Belén Luján	5 June 2011	South American Championships	Buenos Aires, Argentina	
20 km walk (road)	1:48:30	Lidia Ojeda de Carriego	16 September 1990		Buenos Aires, Argentina	
4 × 100 m relay	44.90 A	Argentina; Belkis Fava; Angela Godoy; Liliana Cragno; Beatriz Allocco	20 October 1975	Pan American Games	Mexico City, Mexico	
4 × 200 m relay	1:41.7 h	Club Athlético Olimpia; Liliana Rosa Cragno; Graciela Pinto; Adriana Vives; Ángela Godoy	18 November 1973		Buenos Aires, Argentina	
4 × 400 m relay	3:35.96 A	Argentina; María Ayelén Diogo; Valeria Baron; Noelia Martínez; Fiorella Chiappe	8 June 2018	South American Games	Cochabamba, Bolivia	
4 × 800 m relay	9:35.0	Argentina; Olga Caccaviello; Iris Fernández; Liliana Angelucci; Graciela Escalada	21 August 1977		Buenos Aires, Argentina	
4 × 1500 m relay	20:11.0	Argentina; Olga Caccaviello; Iris Fernández; Liliana Angelucci; Beatriz Vázquez	21 August 1977		Buenos Aires, Argentina	

=== Mixed ===
Event	Record	Athlete	Date	Meet	Place	Ref.
4 × 400 m relay	3:16.93	Argentina; Agustín Pinti; Maria Florencia Lamboglia; Elián Larregina; Megan Powell	24 September 2026	South American Games	Santa Fe, Argentina	

== Indoor ==
=== Men ===
Event	Record	Athlete	Date	Meet	Place	Ref.
50 m	5.83	Jorge Polanco	5 February 1997		Madrid, Spain	
50 m	5.7 h	Adelio Márquez	23 July 1946		Buenos Aires, Argentina	
50 m	5.7 h	Joaquín Gimeno	8 August 1944		Buenos Aires, Argentina	
60 m	6.67 A	Franco Florio	22 February 2025	South American Championships	Cochabamba, Bolivia	
60 m	6.5 h	Carlos Alberto Gats	20 February 1998		Madrid, Spain	
200 m	21.08	Carlos Gats	5 March 1999	World Championships	Maebashi, Japan	
400 m	46.37 A	Elián Larregina	28 January 2024	South American Championships	Cochabamba, Bolivia	
800 m	1:49.00	Luis Migueles	8 March 1991	World Championships	Seville, Spain	
1000 m	2:23.31	Luis Migueles	13 February 1991		Madrid, Spain	
1500 m	3:38.03	Federico Bruno	8 February 2022	Meeting Internacional de Catalunya	Sabadell, Spain	
Mile	4:00.24	Matías Reynaga	21 February 2026	USC Invite	Columbia, United States	
2000 m	5:09.61	Federico Bruno	26 January 2013		Bordeaux, France	
3000 m	7:47.21	Federico Bruno	25 January 2023		Valencia, Spain	
5000 m	13:42.54	Antonio Silio	20 February 1990		San Sebastián, Spain	
50 m hurdles	6.8 h	Albert Triulzi	12 August 1946		Buenos Aires, Argentina	
60 m hurdles	7.85 A	Agustin Carrera	20 February 2022	South American Championships	Cochabamba, Bolivia	
High jump	2.16 m A	Carlos Layoy	2 February 2020	South American Championships	Cochabamba, Bolivia	
High jump	2.16 m A	Carlos Layoy	20 February 2022		Cochabamba, Bolivia	
Pole vault	5.60 m	Germán Chiaraviglio	10 February 2007		Donetsk, Ukraine	
Pole vault	5.60 m	Germán Chiaraviglio	20 February 2016		Glasgow, United Kingdom	
Long jump	7.24 m	Santiago Lorenzo	27 January 2001		Cedar Falls, United States	
Long jump	7.24 m	Joel dos Santos	14 January 2022 (Note: by CADA source; 15 January by World Athletics source)		Topeka, United States	
Triple jump	16.52 m A	Maximiliano Díaz	2 February 2020	South American Championships	Cochabamba, Bolivia	
Shot put	21.04 m	Germán Lauro	25 February 2014	Prague Indoor	Prague, Czech Republic	
Heptathlon	5608 pts	Santiago Lorenzo	25–26 January 2002		Madison, United States	
Heptathlon	60m / Long jump / Shot put / High jump / 60m H / Pole vault / 1000m; 7.21 / 7.11 m / 14.12 m / 1.91 m / 8.45 / 4.90 m / 2:51.66					
5000 m walk						
4 × 400 m relay	3:20.75 A	Tomás Villegas; Francisco Ferreccio; Lorenzo Rossetto; Manuel Juárez	1 March 2026	South American Championships	Cochabamba, Bolivia	

=== Women ===
Event	Record	Athlete	Date	Meet	Place	Ref.
50 m	6.4 h	Beatriz Allocco	17 August 1973		Buenos Aires, Argentina	
60 m	7.42 A (heat)	María Florencia Lamboglia	27 January 2024	South American Championships	Cochabamba, Bolivia	
60 m	7.42 A (final)	María Florencia Lamboglia	27 January 2024	South American Championships	Cochabamba, Bolivia	
200 m	24.41 A	Noelia Martínez	2 February 2020	South American Championships	Cochabamba, Bolivia	
400 m	54.79	Cora Olivero	1 March 2003		Valencia, Spain	
800 m	2:07.32	Carmen Arrúa	28 February 1991		Seville, Spain	
1000 m	2:47.60	Isabel Conde De Frankenberg	20 January 2024	Officials Hall of Fame Invitational	New York City, United States	
1500 m	4:12.95	Fedra Luna	28 January 2023	Meeting Internacional Catalunya	Sabadell, Spain	
Mile	4:47.35	Carolina Lozano	11 February 2023	Boston University David Hemery Valentine Invite	Boston, United States	
3000 m	8:57.59	Fedra Luna	4 February 2023		Val-de-Reuil, France	
5000 m	16:14.03	Carolina Lozano	4 February 2023	Boston University Bruce Lehane Scarlet and White Invite	Boston, United States	
60 m hurdles	8.29 A (final)	Helen Bernard Stilling	23 February 2025	South American Championships	Cochabamba, Bolivia	
High jump	1.94 m	Solange Witteveen	9 February 2000		Brno, Czech Republic	
Pole vault	4.25 m	Alejandra García	6 October 2004		Santa Fe, Argentina	
Long jump	6.00 m A	Milagros D'Amico	28 February 2026	South American Championships	Cochabamba, Bolivia	
Triple jump	13.66 m	Andrea Ávila	13 March 1993	World Championships	Toronto, Canada	
Shot put	15.54 m	Jennifer Dahlgren	14 February 2004	Virginia Tech Elite	Blacksburg, United States	
Shot put	15.54 m	Jennifer Dahlgren	5 February 2006		Gainesville, United States	
Weight throw	24.04 m	Jennifer Dahlgren	10 March 2006		Fayetteville, United States	
Pentathlon	3407 pts	Solange Witteveen	3 April 2012		Jyväskylä, Finland	
Pentathlon	60m H / High jump / Shot put / Long jump / 800m; 9.15 / 1.75 m / 8.57 m / 5.39 m / 3:15.06					
Pentathlon	3453 pts (Note: by CADA and World Athletics source; 3543 pts by other sources) (Note: ratified by CADA but not recognized by World Athletics) OT	Noelina Madarieta	31 January 2020 (Note: by CADA source; 1 February 2020 by World Athletics source)	Washington Invitational	Seattle, United States	
Pentathlon	60m H / High jump / Shot put / Long jump / 800m; 8.86 / 1.51 m / 9.84 m / 5.48 m / 2:31.92					
3000 m walk	18:36.19 (Note: not ratified by CADA but recognized by World Athletics)	Olga Buitrago	3 March 2010		Kamloops, Canada	
4 × 400 m relay	3:59.15 A	Argentina; Martina Escudero; Valentina Polanco; María Lamboglia; Noelia Martínez	20 February 2022	South American Championships	Cochabamba, Bolivia	
