= 2012 South American Under-23 Championships in Athletics – Results =

These are the full results of the 2012 South American Under-23 Championships in Athletics which took place between September 22 and September 23, 2012, at Estádio Ícaro de Castro Melo in São Paulo, Brazil.

== Men's results ==
=== 100 meters ===
Heat 1 – 22 September 9:20h
Humidity: 53% – Temperature: 23.0 °C - Wind: -1.2 m/s

Rank	Name	Nationality	Reaction time	Time	Notes
1	Aldemir Gomes da Silva Júnior	Brazil	0.162	10.64	Q
2	Matías Robledo	Argentina	0.140	10.79	Q
3	Andy Martínez	Peru	0.175	10.85	Q
4	Roberto Murillo	Colombia	0.188	10.88	q
5	Bruno Rojas	Bolivia	0.185	10.92	q

Heat 2 – 22 September 9:20h
Humidity: 54% – Temperature: 21.0 °C - Wind: -0.1 m/s

Rank	Name	Nationality	Reaction time	Time	Notes
1	Isidro Montoya	Colombia	0.195	10.76	Q
2	Jorge Henrique da Costa Vides	Brazil	0.187	10.84	Q
3	Chavez Ageday	Guyana	0.165	10.90	Q
4	Cristián Leguizamón	Paraguay	0.222	10.99	
5	Falcon Fagundes	Uruguay	0.243	11.16	

Final – 22 September 11:55h
Humidity: 50% – Temperature: 23.0 °C - Wind: +0.3 m/s

Rank	Name	Nationality	Reaction time	Time	Notes
1st place, gold medalist(s)	Aldemir Gomes da Silva Júnior	Brazil	0.133	10.42	
2nd place, silver medalist(s)	Isidro Montoya	Colombia	0.167	10.45	
3rd place, bronze medalist(s)	Chavez Ageday	Guyana	0.123	10.65	
4	Matías Robledo	Argentina	0.176	10.67	
5	Jorge Henrique da Costa Vides	Brazil	0.173	10.73	
6	Andy Martínez	Peru	0.165	10.74	
7	Bruno Rojas	Bolivia	0.174	10.76	
8	Roberto Murillo	Colombia	0.163	10.83	

=== 200 meters ===
Heat 1 – 23 September 9:35h
Humidity: 54% – Temperature: 20.0 °C - Wind: +1.6 m/s

Rank	Name	Nationality	Reaction time	Time	Notes
1	Aldemir Gomes da Silva Júnior	Brazil		21.38	Q
2	Stephan James	Guyana		21.65	Q
3	Arturo Ramírez	Venezuela		21.80	Q
4	Fredy Maidana	Paraguay		22.28	
5	Jordy Portilla	Peru		22.69	
6	Roberto Murillo	Colombia		22.70	

Heat 2 – 23 September 9:35h
Humidity: 54% – Temperature: 20 °C - Wind: +1.0 m/s

Rank	Name	Nationality	Reaction time	Time	Notes
1	Bernardo Baloyes	Colombia		20.91	Q
2	Jorge Henrique da Costa Vides	Brazil		21.17	Q
3	Chavez Ageday	Guyana		21.62	Q
4	Bruno Rojas	Bolivia		21.80	q
5	Lucas Semino	Argentina		22.00	q
6	Falcon Fagundes	Uruguay		22.37	

Final – 23 September 11:35h
Humidity: 43% – Temperature: 24.0 °C - Wind: +1.2 m/s

Rank	Name	Nationality	Reaction time	Time	Notes
1st place, gold medalist(s)	Aldemir Gomes da Silva Júnior	Brazil	0.195	20.51	
2nd place, silver medalist(s)	Bernardo Baloyes	Colombia	0.130	20.87	
3rd place, bronze medalist(s)	Arturo Ramírez	Venezuela	0.199	21.00	
4	Jorge Henrique da Costa Vides	Brazil	0.129	21.12	
5	Stephan James	Guyana	0.189	21.41	
6	Chavez Ageday	Guyana	0.227	21.72	
7	Bruno Rojas	Bolivia	0.187	21.81	
8	Lucas Semino	Argentina	0.182	22.17	

=== 400 meters ===
Heat 1 – 22 September 10:00h
Humidity: 50% – Temperature: 22.0 °C

Rank	Name	Nationality	Reaction time	Time	Notes
1	Stephan James	Guyana	0.237	47.18	Q
2	Arturo Ramírez	Venezuela	0.165	47.21	Q
3	Anderson Machado dos Santos	Brazil	0.261	47.24	Q
4	Alejandro Chalá	Ecuador	0.223	48.71	q
5	Paulo Herrera	Peru	0.268	48.74	q
6	Andrés Mendoza	Argentina	0.175	49.37	

Heat 2 – 22 September 10:00h
Humidity: 50% – Temperature: 23.0 °C

Rank	Name	Nationality	Reaction time	Time	Notes
1	Pedro Luiz Burmann de Oliveira	Brazil	0.207	47.07	Q
2	Alejandro Perlaza	Colombia	0.247	47.54	Q
3	Fabio Martínez	Argentina	0.348	48.27	Q
4	Jordy Portilla	Peru	0.270	49.54	
	José Meléndez	Venezuela	0.229	DNF	

Final – 22 September 15:20h
Humidity: 52% – Temperature: 23.0 °C

Rank	Name	Nationality	Reaction time	Time	Notes
1st place, gold medalist(s)	Pedro Luiz Burmann de Oliveira	Brazil	0.234	45.52	
2nd place, silver medalist(s)	Arturo Ramírez	Venezuela	0.191	46.20	
3rd place, bronze medalist(s)	Stephan James	Guyana	0.232	46.52	
4	Anderson Machado dos Santos	Brazil	0.263	46.57	
5	Alejandro Perlaza	Colombia	0.216	46.61	
6	Fabio Martínez	Argentina	0.185	46.66	
7	Alejandro Chalá	Ecuador	0.191	48.80	
8	Paulo Herrera	Peru	0.173	49.02	

=== 800 meters ===
Final – 23 September 14:30h
Humidity: 50% – Temperature: 24.0 °C

Rank	Name	Nationality	Time	Notes
1st place, gold medalist(s)	Tomás Squella	Chile	1:48.06	
2nd place, silver medalist(s)	David Diaz Franco	Argentina	1:48.34	
3rd place, bronze medalist(s)	Lucirio Antonio Garrido	Venezuela	1:48.60	
4	Iván López	Chile	1:49.29	
5	Juan Sebastián Vega	Argentina	1:51.76	
6	Alex Sandro Jesus de Oliveira	Brazil	1:52.43	
7	Edmundo Díaz	Peru	1:53.39	
8	Milton Castro	Uruguay	1:54.04	
9	Adriano Felipe Pereira do Carmo	Brazil	1:55.99	

=== 1500 meters ===
Final – 22 September 10:40h
Humidity: 46% – Temperature: 22 °C

Rank	Name	Nationality	Time	Notes
1st place, gold medalist(s)	Federico Bruno	Argentina	3:47.13	
2nd place, silver medalist(s)	Iván López	Chile	3:48.07	
3rd place, bronze medalist(s)	Carlos Díaz	Chile	3:50.01	
4	Jean Carlos Dolberth Machado	Brazil	3:50.11	
5	Kelvyn Mendes Martins	Brazil	3:53.28	
6	Lucirio Antonio Garrido	Venezuela	4:03.04	

=== 5000 meters ===
Final – 23 September 9:00h
Humidity (initial/final): 54%/55% – Temperature (initial/final): 20.0 °C/20.0 °C

Rank	Name	Nationality	Time	Notes
1st place, gold medalist(s)	Víctor Aravena	Chile	14:16.25	
2nd place, silver medalist(s)	Federico Bruno	Argentina	14:24.21	
3rd place, bronze medalist(s)	Daniel Toroya	Bolivia	14:29.30	
4	Antonio Naranjo	Colombia	14:33.89	
5	José Luis Rojas	Peru	14:38.27	
6	Allison Rocha Peres	Brazil	14:40.03	
7	Altobeli Santos da Silva	Brazil	14:45.76	
8	Joaquín Arbe	Argentina	14:46.25	
9	Alexis Peña	Venezuela	14:46.33	
10	Carlos Díaz	Chile	14:46.86	
11	Jeison Suarez	Colombia	15:04.28	
12	Miguel Mallma	Peru	15:14.66	
13	Derlis Ayala	Paraguay	15:47.43	
	Daniel Larrosa	Uruguay	DNF	

=== 10,000 meters ===
Final – 22 September 16:40h
Humidity: 70% – Temperature: 17.0 °C

Rank	Name	Nationality	Time	Notes
1st place, gold medalist(s)	Víctor Aravena	Chile	30:31.93	
2nd place, silver medalist(s)	José Luis Rojas	Peru	30:32.82	
3rd place, bronze medalist(s)	Wily Canchanya	Peru	30:33.11	
4	Daniel Toroya	Bolivia	30:38.73	
5	Altobeli Santos da Silva	Brazil	30:41.39	
6	Miguel Ángel Amador	Colombia	30:52.61	
7	Nicolás Herrera	Colombia	30:55.12	
8	Mauricio Matute	Ecuador	31:06.03	
9	Everton Barbosa da Silva	Brazil	31:54.78	

=== 3000 meters steeplechase ===
Final – 22 September 16:20h
Humidity: 63% – Temperature: 19.0 °C

Rank	Name	Nationality	Time	Notes
1st place, gold medalist(s)	Alexis Peña	Venezuela	8:53.42	
2nd place, silver medalist(s)	Jean Carlos Dolberth Machado	Brazil	8:54.53	
3rd place, bronze medalist(s)	Joaquín Arbe	Argentina	8:55.90	
4	Daniel Estrada	Chile	8:56.67	
5	Alex Sandro Jesus de Oliveira	Brazil	9:39.60	
6	Derlis Ayala	Paraguay	9:50.03	
7	Daniel Larrosa	Uruguay	10:14.11	

=== 110 meters hurdles ===
Heat 1 – 22 September 14:00h
Humidity: 48% – Temperature: 23.0 °C - Wind: -1.2 m/s

Rank	Name	Nationality	Reaction time	Time	Notes
1	João Vitor de Oliveira	Brazil	0.171	14.60	Q
2	Carlos Pino	Colombia	0.201	14.64	Q
3	Facundo Andrade	Argentina	0.187	14.79	Q
4	David Franco	Venezuela	0.166	15.03	q
5	Camilo Acebey	Bolivia	0.172	15.39	

Heat 2 – 22 September 14:00h
Humidity: 48% – Temperature: 23.0 °C - Wind: -1.2 m/s

Rank	Name	Nationality	Reaction time	Time	Notes
1	Patricio Colarte	Chile	0.184	14.63	Q
2	Javier McFarlane	Peru	0.156	14.78	Q
3	Jefferson Valencia	Colombia	0.204	14.85	Q
4	Robson Vieira Braga	Brazil	0.196	14.94	q

Final – 22 September 15:50h
Humidity: 52% – Temperature: 22.9 °C - Wind: -0.9 m/s

Rank	Name	Nationality	Reaction time	Time	Notes
1st place, gold medalist(s)	João Vitor de Oliveira	Brazil	0.152	14.14	
2nd place, silver medalist(s)	Robson Vieira Braga	Brazil	0.183	14.28	
3rd place, bronze medalist(s)	Jefferson Valencia	Colombia	0.185	14.57	
4	Javier McFarlane	Peru	0.168	14.60	
5	Carlos Pino	Colombia	0.170	14.61	
6	Patricio Colarte	Chile	0.148	14.73	
7	Facundo Andrade	Argentina	0.143	14.76	
8	David Franco	Venezuela	0.170	14.81	

=== 400 meters hurdles ===
Final – 23 September 14:00h
Humidity: 47% – Temperature: 26.0 °C

Rank	Name	Nationality	Reaction time	Time	Notes
1st place, gold medalist(s)	Hederson Alves Estefani	Brazil	0.160	51.02	
2nd place, silver medalist(s)	Alejandro Chalá	Ecuador	0.251	51.11	
3rd place, bronze medalist(s)	Vinicius Paixão Guimarães	Brazil	0.159	51.69	
4	Jefferson Valencia	Colombia	0.296	52.57	
5	Andrés Mendoza	Argentina	0.188	52.59	
6	Alejandro Peirano	Chile	0.217	53.44	

=== High jump ===
Final – 23 September 10:00h
Humidity (initial/final): 51%/51% – Temperature (initial/final): 21 °C/21 °C

Rank	Name	Nationality	Attempts							Result	Notes
Rank	Name	Nationality	2.05	2.10	2.13	2.16	2.19	2.21	2.24	Result	Notes
1st place, gold medalist(s)	Talles Frederico Silva	Brazil	-	xo	-	o	xo	o	xxx	2.21	
2nd place, silver medalist(s)	Carlos Layoy	Argentina	o	o	-	xo	xo	xxx		2.19	
3rd place, bronze medalist(s)	Rafael dos Santos	Brazil	xo	xo	o	o	xxx			2.16	
4	Eure Yánez	Venezuela	o	o	xo	xo	xxx			2.16	
5	Arturo Chávez	Peru	xo	o	xo	xo	xxx			2.16	

=== Pole vault ===
Final – 22 September 14:00h
Humidity (initial/final): 49%/50% – Temperature (initial/final): 23 °C/22 °C

Rank	Name	Nationality	Attempts								Result	Notes
Rank	Name	Nationality	4.40	4.60	4.80	4.90	5.00	5.05	5.10	5.15	Result	Notes
1st place, gold medalist(s)	Matheus Bernardino da Silva	Brazil	-	-	o	xo	o	xo	-	xxx	5.05	
2nd place, silver medalist(s)	Rubén Benítez	Argentina	-	xo	o	o	o	x-	xx		5.00	
3rd place, bronze medalist(s)	Daniel Zupeuc	Chile	o	o	o	xxx					4.80	
4	Abel Curtinove	Brazil	-	xxo	xxx						4.60	
5	Alejandro Aguilar	Argentina	o	xxx							4.40	

=== Long jump ===
Final – 22 September 14:35h
Humidity (initial/final): 51%/52% – Temperature (initial/final): 22 °C/21 °C

Rank	Name	Nationality	Attempts						Result	Notes
Rank	Name	Nationality	1	2	3	4	5	6	Result	Notes
1st place, gold medalist(s)	Rebert Firmiano	Brazil	7.73 (1.0)	x	7.67 w (2.8)	7.70 w (3.3)	7.96 w (3.0)	x	7.96 w (+3.0 m/s)	
2nd place, silver medalist(s)	Higor Alves	Brazil	7.59 (1.4)	7.72 w (2.3)	7.36 (-1.8)	7.41 (-0.3)	x	x	7.72 w (+2.3 m/s)	
3rd place, bronze medalist(s)	Emiliano Lasa	Uruguay	7.57 w (2.2)	x	x	7.60 w (4.3)	x	7.63 w (2.7)	7.63 w (+2.7 m/s)	
4	Edwin Murillo	Colombia	6.91 (1.4)	6.93 (2.0)	x	7.27 w (2.9)	7.01 (1.8)	7.09 w (2.5)	7.27 w (+2.9 m/s)	

=== Triple jump ===
Final – 23 September 15:15h
Humidity (initial/final): 58%/55% – Temperature (initial/final): 23 °C/22 °C

Rank	Name	Nationality	Attempts						Result	Notes
Rank	Name	Nationality	1	2	3	4	5	6	Result	Notes
1st place, gold medalist(s)	Jonathan Henrique Silva	Brazil	15.55 (-0.0)	15.98 (-1.0)	-	x	-	16.19 w (2.4)	16.19 w (+2.4 m/s)	
2nd place, silver medalist(s)	Jean Cassimiro Rosa	Brazil	15.43 (1.6)	15.68 w (2.7)	x	-	x	14.66 (-0.5)	15.68 w (+2.7 m/s)	
3rd place, bronze medalist(s)	Divie Murillo	Colombia	13.55 (0.9)	15.07 (1.4)	14.64 (0.6)	14.83 (-0.6)	15.19 (1.0)	15.37 (0.5)	15.37 (+0.5 m/s)	

=== Shot put ===
Final – 23 September 9:00h
Humidity (initial/final): 54%/53% – Temperature (initial/final): 20 °C/20 °C

Rank	Name	Nationality	Attempts						Result	Notes
Rank	Name	Nationality	1	2	3	4	5	6	Result	Notes
1st place, gold medalist(s)	Darlan Romani	Brazil	19.88	18.63	19.93	19.62	19.19	x	19.93	
2nd place, silver medalist(s)	Willian Braido	Brazil	18.23	18.08	18.51	18.32	x	18.85	18.85	
3rd place, bronze medalist(s)	José Joaquín Ballivián	Chile	16.89	x	16.80	x	16.72	17.28	17.28	
4	Nicolás Laso	Chile	15.71	x	x	x	x	x	15.71	
5	Juan Caicedo	Ecuador	12.36	12.96	x	x	x	x	12.96	

=== Discus throw ===
Final – 22 September 14:00h
Humidity (initial/final): 51%/49% – Temperature (initial/final): 22 °C/23 °C

Rank	Name	Nationality	Attempts						Result	Notes
Rank	Name	Nationality	1	2	3	4	5	6	Result	Notes
1st place, gold medalist(s)	Mauricio Ortega	Colombia	51.56	x	53.94	49.47	x	49.84	53.94	
2nd place, silver medalist(s)	Felipe Lorenzon	Brazil	49.13	51.71	x	x	x	51.34	51.71	
3rd place, bronze medalist(s)	Thiago de Jesus Santos Negreiros	Brazil	49.11	42.64	51.48	x	50.40	49.12	51.48	
4	Juan José Caicedo	Ecuador	47.53	x	x	x	x	50.81	50.81	
5	Nicolás Laso	Chile	47.59	x	49.55	x	x	x	49.55	
6	Juan Ignacio Solito	Argentina	47.29	x	45.05	46.49	x	44.92	47.29	
7	Michael Miranda	Bolivia	40.83	42.52	43.63	34.87	x	41.95	43.63	

=== Hammer throw ===
Final – 22 September 8:00h
Humidity (initial/final): 51%/58% – Temperature (initial/final): 23 °C/20 °C

Rank	Name	Nationality	Attempts						Result	Notes
Rank	Name	Nationality	1	2	3	4	5	6	Result	Notes
1st place, gold medalist(s)	Allan da Silva Wolski	Brazil	56.69	x	61.43	63.20	62.24	61.28	63.20	
2nd place, silver medalist(s)	Hevertt Álvarez	Chile	60.24	61.18	59.22	x	59.84	60.87	61.18	
3rd place, bronze medalist(s)	Pedro Muniz da Costa	Brazil	x	59.11	x	59.11	x	60.84	60.84	
4	Guillermo Braulio	Ecuador	55.57	x	x	55.69	56.74	57.49	57.49	
5	Luciano del Rio	Argentina	54.05	55.67	x	56.49	x	x	56.49	
6	Jaime Díaz	Chile	52.89	51.93	52.49	x	54.31	55.57	55.57	
7	Carlos Yépez	Venezuela	x	x	x	x	53.71	x	53.71	

=== Javelin throw ===
Final – 23 September 8:30h
Humidity (initial/final): 63%/55% – Temperature (initial/final): 19 °C/20 °C

Rank	Name	Nationality	Attempts						Result	Notes
Rank	Name	Nationality	1	2	3	4	5	6	Result	Notes
1st place, gold medalist(s)	Braian Toledo	Argentina	70.12	74.80	74.90	74.57	78.49	x	78.49	
2nd place, silver medalist(s)	Tomás Guerra	Chile	71.30	71.03	x	x	x	67.59	71.30	
3rd place, bronze medalist(s)	Paulo Enrique Alves da Silva	Brazil	70.97	65.36	65.66	69.49	67.16	71.23	71.23	
4	Lucas Ivan Lima da Silva	Brazil	66.78	62.04	64.90	64.85	68.00	66.08	68.00	
5	José Escobar	Ecuador	66.72	65.75	65.63	67.21	65.92	67.62	67.62	
6	Fabián Jara	Paraguay	65.72	63.42	62.32	57.33	x	58.37	65.72	
7	Luis Debia	Venezuela	57.80	59.64	x	56.96	58.07	56.21	59.64	

=== Decathlon ===
Final – 23 September 16:05h
Humidity (initial/final): 63%/55% – Temperature (initial/final): 19 °C/20 °C

The highest mark recorded in each event is highlighted in yellow

Rank	Name	Nationality	100m	LJ	SP	HJ	400m	110m H	DT	PV	JT	1500m	Points	Notes
1st place, gold medalist(s)	Guillermo Ruggeri	Argentina	10.94 (-0.6); 874pts	6.41 (1.9); 677pts	12.84; 657pts	1.88; 696pts	48.59; 881pts	14.60 (NWI); 899pts	36.90; 602pts	4.10; 645pts	53.67; 643pts	4:48.28; 629pts	7203	
2nd place, silver medalist(s)	Ricardo Herrada	Venezuela	11.53 (-0.6); 746pts	6.99 (1.0); 811pts	11.80; 594pts	1.82; 644pts	51.73; 730pts	15.15 (NWI); 831pts	37.38; 612pts	4.40; 731pts	54.39; 654pts	4:56.98; 577pts	6930	
3rd place, bronze medalist(s)	Óscar Campos	Venezuela	11.25 (-0.6); 806pts	6.86 (1.0); 781pts	11.34; 566pts	1.76; 593pts	50.98; 770pts	15.90 (NWI); 744pts	33.63; 536pts	4.20; 673pts	58.91; 721pts	4:38.72; 688pts	6878	
4	Pedro Franco de Almeida de Lima	Brazil	11.54 (-0.6); 744pts	6.78 (1.0); 762pts	11.06; 549pts	1.91; 723pts	49.82; 823pts	15.72 (NWI); 765pts	38.08; 626pts	4.20; 673pts	45.47; 522pts	4:38.87; 687pts	6874	
5	Matías Dallaserra	Chile	11.40 (-0.6); 774pts	6.50 (1.2); 697pts	12.84; 657pts	1.85; 670pts	51.47; 748pts	16.12 (NWI); 719pts	35.81; 580pts	3.90; 590pts	43.52; 493pts	4:25.89; 772pts	6700	
6	Fidel Baucero	Argentina	11.59 (-0.6); 734pts	6.53 (3.1); 704pts	10.32; 505pts	1.85; 670pts	50.27; 802pts	15.87 (NWI); 747pts	32.94; 523pts	3.90; 590pts	43.80; 497pts	4:25.11; 777pts	6549	
7	Estevão de Souza Lima	Brazil	11.71 (-0.6); 709pts	7.01 (1.5); 816pts	10.70; 528pts	1.85; 670pts	52.55; 701pts	15.96 (NWI); 737pts	35.75; 579pts	4.00; 617pts	44.20; 503pts	4:40.79; 675pts	6535	

=== 20,000 meters walk ===
Final – 22 September 7:00h
Humidity: 60% – Temperature: 21.0 °C

Rank	Name	Nationality	Time	Notes
1st place, gold medalist(s)	Caio Oliveira de Sena Bonfim	Brazil	1:23:22.8	
2nd place, silver medalist(s)	José Leonardo Montaña	Colombia	1:23:41.5	
3rd place, bronze medalist(s)	Richard Vargas	Venezuela	1:29:46.6	
4	Rudney Dias Nogueira	Brazil	1:30:38.3	

=== 4x100 meters relay ===
Final – 22 September 18:15h
Humidity: 76% – Temperature: 16.0 °C

Rank	Nation	Competitors	Reaction time	Time	Notes
1st place, gold medalist(s)	Brazil	Jackson Cesar da Silva; Jorge Henrique da Costa Vides; Aldemir Gomes da Silva Júnior; Eric Sigaki Martins de Jesus	0.175	40.10	
2nd place, silver medalist(s)	Colombia	Jefferson Valencia; Bernardo Baloyes; Roberto Murillo; Isidro Montoya	0.167	40.14	
3rd place, bronze medalist(s)	Argentina	Matías Robledo; Fabio Martínez; Lucas Semino; Rubén Benítez	0.154	40.82	
	Venezuela	Cleiderman Medina; Arturo Ramírez; David Franco; Noel Campos	0.234	DNF	

=== 4x400 meters relay ===
Final – 23 September 16:35h
Humidity: 70% – Temperature: 18.0 °C

Rank	Nation	Competitors	Time	Notes
1st place, gold medalist(s)	Brazil	Anderson Machado dos Santos; Willian Batista Carvalho; Jonathan da Silva; Pedro Luiz Burmann de Oliveira	3:07.44	
2nd place, silver medalist(s)	Venezuela	Noel Campos; Lucirio Francisco Garrido; Cleiderman Medina; Arturo Ramírez	3:08.56	
3rd place, bronze medalist(s)	Peru	Jordy Portilla; Andy Martínez; Edmundo Díaz; Paulo Herrera	3:14.18	
4	Argentina	Andrés Mendoza; David Diaz Franco; Juan Sebastián Vega; Fabio Martínez	3:14.95	
5	Chile	Patricio Colarte; Alejandro Peirano; Iván López; Tomás Squella	3:18.09	
	Colombia	José Lemos; Jhon Perlaza; Jefferson Valencia; Bernardo Baloyes	DQ	IAAF Rule 170.20

== Women's results ==
=== 100 meters ===
Heat 1 – 22 September 11:40h
Humidity: 49% – Temperature: 23.0 °C - Wind: -0.3 m/s

Rank	Name	Nationality	Reaction time	Time	Notes
1	Vanusa dos Santos	Brazil	0.176	11.71	Q
2	Carmen Vergara	Colombia	0.169	12.15	Q
3	Ruth Cassandra Hunt	Panama	0.170	12.29	Q
4	Paola Mautino	Peru	0.175	12.35	q
5	Gimena Gasco	Uruguay	0.190	12.67	q

Heat 2 – 22 September 11:40h
Humidity: 48% – Temperature: 23.0 °C - Wind: -3.7 m/s

Rank	Name	Nationality	Reaction time	Time	Notes
1	Merlin Palacios	Colombia	0.562	12.07	Q
2	Andressa Moreira Fidelis	Brazil	0.146	12.12	Q
3	Victoria Woodward	Argentina	0.501	12.14	Q
4	Fernanda Trujillo	Bolivia	0.214	13.07	
	Laura Lupano	Uruguay		DQ	IAAF Rule 162.6

Final – 22 September 14:35h
Humidity: 50% – Temperature: 23.0 °C - Wind: +0.5 m/s

Rank	Name	Nationality	Reaction time	Time	Notes
1st place, gold medalist(s)	Vanusa dos Santos	Brazil	0.186	11.72	
2nd place, silver medalist(s)	Merlin Palacios	Colombia	0.233	11.85	
3rd place, bronze medalist(s)	Victoria Woodward	Argentina	0.235	11.88	
4	Andressa Moreira Fidelis	Brazil	0.164	11.92	
5	Carmen Vergara	Colombia	0.320	12.16	
6	Paola Mautino	Peru	0.202	12.35	
7	Ruth Cassandra Hunt	Panama	0.181	12.44	
8	Gimena Gasco	Uruguay	0.160	12.69	

=== 200 meters ===
Final – 23 September 11:50h
Humidity: 45% – Temperature: 24.0 °C - Wind: +1.2 m/s

Rank	Name	Nationality	Reaction time	Time	Notes
1st place, gold medalist(s)	Nercely Soto	Venezuela	0.288	23.40	
2nd place, silver medalist(s)	Isidora Jiménez	Chile	0.175	23.63	
3rd place, bronze medalist(s)	Vanusa dos Santos	Brazil	0.150	23.79	
4	Yenifer Padilla	Colombia	0.196	23.80	
5	Merlin Palacios	Colombia	0.384	24.22	
6	Thais Evelin da Costa Vides	Brazil	0.497	24.48	
7	Laura Lupano	Uruguay	0.220	25.63	
8	Fernanda Trujillo	Bolivia	0.552	25.93	

=== 400 meters ===
Final – 22 September 15:35h
Humidity: 54% – Temperature: 20.0 °C

Rank	Name	Nationality	Reaction time	Time	Notes
1st place, gold medalist(s)	Yenifer Padilla	Colombia	0.195	53.12	
2nd place, silver medalist(s)	Nercely Soto	Venezuela	0.588	53.45	
3rd place, bronze medalist(s)	Jessica Gonzaga dos Santos	Brazil	0.175	54.22	
4	Janeth Largacha	Colombia	0.289	54.38	
5	Barbara Farias de Oliveira	Brazil	0.522	54.63	
6	María Ayelén Diogo	Argentina	0.289	55.85	
7	Natrena Hooper	Guyana	0.192	56.04	
8	Maitte Torres	Peru	0162	56.46	

=== 800 meters ===
Final – 23 September 14:45h
Humidity: 51% – Temperature: 24.4 °C

Rank	Name	Nationality	Time	Notes
1st place, gold medalist(s)	Jessica Gonzaga dos Santos	Brazil	2:07.42	
2nd place, silver medalist(s)	Evangelina Thomas	Argentina	2:08.15	
3rd place, bronze medalist(s)	Andrea Calderón	Ecuador	2:08.51	
4	Mariana Borelli	Argentina	2:09.44	
5	Erika Oliveira Lima	Brazil	2:12.41	

=== 1500 meters ===
Final – 22 September 14:50h
Humidity: 50% – Temperature: 22.0 °C

Rank	Name	Nationality	Time	Notes
1st place, gold medalist(s)	Erika Oliveira Lima	Brazil	4:26.29	
2nd place, silver medalist(s)	Thayra Francis dos Santos	Brazil	4:30.09	
3rd place, bronze medalist(s)	Evangelina Thomas	Argentina	4:35.54	

=== 5000 meters ===
Final – 22 September 17:40h
Humidity: 74% – Temperature: 16.0 °C

Rank	Name	Nationality	Time	Notes
1st place, gold medalist(s)	Yony Ninahuamán	Peru	16:50.21	
2nd place, silver medalist(s)	Adriana Cristina Silva da Luz	Brazil	16:50.43	
3rd place, bronze medalist(s)	Florencia Borelli	Argentina	17:00.04	
4	Larisse do Nascimento de Sousa	Brazil	17:03.27	

=== 10,000 meters ===
Final – 23 September 15:00h
Humidity: 51% – Temperature: 24.4 °C

Rank	Name	Nationality	Time	Notes
1st place, gold medalist(s)	Florencia Borelli	Argentina	35:29.08	
2nd place, silver medalist(s)	Adriana Cristina Silva da Luz	Brazil	35:37.32	
3rd place, bronze medalist(s)	Valdilene dos Santos Silva	Brazil	35:54.22	

=== 3000 meters steeplechase ===
Final – 22 September 9:40h
Humidity: 46% – Temperature: 25.0 °C

Rank	Name	Nationality	Time	Notes
1st place, gold medalist(s)	Zulema Arenas	Peru	10:14.52	
2nd place, silver medalist(s)	Yony Ninahuamán	Peru	10:27.75	
3rd place, bronze medalist(s)	Tatiane Raquel da Silva	Brazil	10:45.08	
4	Jenifer do Nascimento Silva	Brazil	11:23.74	

=== 100 meters hurdles ===
Final – 22 September 11:20h
Humidity: 50% – Temperature: 23.0 °C - Wind: -1.7 m/s

Rank	Name	Nationality	Reaction time	Time	Notes
1st place, gold medalist(s)	Nelsibeth Villalobos	Venezuela	0.503	14.48	
2nd place, silver medalist(s)	Génesis Romero	Venezuela	0.192	14.58	
3rd place, bronze medalist(s)	Gabriela de Farias Lima	Brazil	0.178	14.65	
4	Natalia Pinzem	Colombia	0.185	14.90	
5	Leidy Valencia	Colombia	0.142	14.98	

=== 400 meters hurdles ===
Heat 1 – 23 September 10:35h
Humidity: 50% – Temperature: 22.0 °C

Rank	Name	Nationality	Reaction time	Time	Notes
1	Déborah Rodríguez	Uruguay	0.169	1:00.78	Q
2	Debora dos Santos	Brazil	0.522	1:01.28	Q
3	Estefani Balladares	Venezuela	0.258	1:02.20	Q
4	Maitte Torres	Peru	0.319	1:04.36	q
5	Karen Palomeque	Colombia	0.260	1:04.40	

Heat 2 – 23 September 10:35h
Humidity: 50% – Temperature: 22.0 °C

Rank	Name	Nationality	Reaction time	Time	Notes
1	Magdalena Mendoza	Venezuela	0.204	1:00.34	Q
2	Javiera Errázuriz	Chile	0.341	1:01.38	Q
3	Melissa Rodrigues Lobo da Silva	Brazil	0.270	1:01.84	Q
4	Juliet Caballero	Colombia	0.404	1:02.53	q
5	Mariana Sans	Uruguay	0.687	1:05.21	

Final – 23 September 14:15h
Humidity: 50% – Temperature: 24.0 °C

Rank	Name	Nationality	Reaction time	Time	Notes
1st place, gold medalist(s)	Déborah Rodríguez	Uruguay	0.400	57.63	
2nd place, silver medalist(s)	Magdalena Mendoza	Venezuela		58.09	
3rd place, bronze medalist(s)	Debora dos Santos	Brazil	0.567	59.14	
4	Javiera Errázuriz	Chile	0.218	59.57	
5	Estefani Balladares	Venezuela	0.266	1:00.68	
6	Melissa Rodrigues Lobo da Silva	Brazil	0.265	1:04.11	
7	Juliet Caballero	Colombia		1:08.47	
	Maitte Torres	Peru	0.176	DNF	

=== High jump ===
Final – 23 September 14:00h
Humidity (initial/final): 47%/51% – Temperature (initial/final): 25 °C/25 °C

Rank	Name	Nationality	Attempts							Result	Notes
Rank	Name	Nationality	1.55	1.60	1.65	1.70	1.73	1.76	1.80	Result	Notes
1st place, gold medalist(s)	Kashani Ríos	Panama	-	o	o	o	o	xo	xxx	1.76	
2nd place, silver medalist(s)	Nulfa Palacios	Colombia	-	-	-	xo	o	xxx		1.73	
3rd place, bronze medalist(s)	Yulimar Rojas	Venezuela	-	-	o	o	xxo	xxx		1.73	
4	Fernanda Amaral Paslauski	Brazil	-	o	o	o	xxx			1.70	
5	Mariana Ribeiro da Silva	Brazil	o	o	o	xo	xxx			1.70	
6	Ariana Gutiérrez	Venezuela	o	o	o	xxx				1.65	
7	Lorena Aires	Uruguay	o	o	xxo	xxx				1.65	

=== Pole vault ===
Final – 22 September 9:05h
Humidity (initial/final): 58%/47% – Temperature (initial/final): 20 °C/22 °C

Rank	Name	Nationality	Attempts											Result	Notes
Rank	Name	Nationality	3.20	3.35	3.50	3.60	3.65	3.70	3.75	3.80	3.85	3.90	4.05	Result	Notes
1st place, gold medalist(s)	Sara Santos Pereira	Brazil	-	-	-	-	-	o	-	o	-	o	xxx	3.90	
2nd place, silver medalist(s)	Maira dos Santos Silva	Brazil	-	o	o	o	xxo	o	o	xo	-	xxx		3.80	
3rd place, bronze medalist(s)	María Victoria Fernández	Chile	o	o	o	o	o	xo	xo	xxx				3.75	
4	Catalina Amarilla	Paraguay	-	o	xxx									3.35	
5	Ana María Betancur	Colombia	o	xo	xxx									3.35	

=== Long jump ===
Final – 23 September 9:00h
Humidity (initial/final): 53%/47% – Temperature (initial/final): 20 °C/23 °C

Rank	Name	Nationality	Attempts						Result	Notes
Rank	Name	Nationality	1	2	3	4	5	6	Result	Notes
1st place, gold medalist(s)	Jessica Carolina Alves dos Reis	Brazil	5.97 (0.9)	5.83 (0.6)	6.18 (1.5)	5.66 (-1.9)	x	5.68 (-2.2)	6.18 (+1.5 m/s)	
2nd place, silver medalist(s)	Nelsibeth Villalobos	Venezuela	5.87 (1.1)	5.84 (0.7)	4.86 w (2.3)	5.79 (-0.5)	5.80 (0.9)	6.09 (1.0)	6.09 (+1.0 m/s)	
3rd place, bronze medalist(s)	Josefina Loyza	Argentina	5.73 (1.0)	5.83 (1.7)	6.03 (1.5)	5.75 (1.9)	5.78 (1.8)	5.64 (-0.3)	6.03 (+1.5 m/s)	
4	Andressa Moreira Fidelis	Brazil	5.91 (-1.6)	5.98 (0.5)	x	5.96 (-0.4)	5.98 (-1.6)	x	5.98 (+0.5 m/s)	
5	Génesis Romero	Venezuela	5.36 w (2.6)	5.60 (1.7)	x	x	4.98 (-1.4)	5.48 (-0.8)	5.60 (+1.7 m/s)	
6	María Victoria Fernández	Chile	5.56 (1.2)	5.57 (0.3)	5.31 (2.0)	5.58 w (3.4)	5.57 (-0.2)	5.45 (-3.4)	5.58 w (+3.4 m/s)	
7	Paola Mautino	Peru	x	x	5.49 (1.8)	x	5.34 (-1.0)	5.51 (-2.0)	5.51 (-2.0 m/s)	
8	Silvana Segura	Peru	x	x	5.41 w (3.1)	5.35 (-1.0)	x	5.35 (-3.0)	5.41 w (+3.1 m/s)	
9	Cindy Fraser	Guyana	x	4.43 (0.3)	4.42 (1.2)	-	-	-	4.43 (+0.3 m/s)	

=== Triple jump ===
Final – 22 September 10:00h
Humidity (initial/final): 50%/47% – Temperature (initial/final): 22 °C/22 °C

Rank	Name	Nationality	Attempts						Result	Notes
Rank	Name	Nationality	1	2	3	4	5	6	Result	Notes
1st place, gold medalist(s)	Giselly Landázury	Colombia	13.31 (1.5)	13.25 w (2.2)	13.03 w (2.3)	13.17 w (2.5)	x	13.22 (1.3)	13.31 (+1.5 m/s)	
2nd place, silver medalist(s)	Yudelsi González	Venezuela	13.13 w (2.5)	13.04 (1.2)	12.81 w (2.7)	12.95 w (2.3)	12.99 (1.0)	x	13.13 w (+2.5 m/s)	
3rd place, bronze medalist(s)	Silvana Segura	Peru	12.77 w (2.7)	x	13.13 (1.7)	x	12.78 w (3.5)	12.21 (0.5)	13.13 (+1.7 m/s)	
4	Gabriele Sousa dos Santos	Brazil	12.54 w (2.8)	x	12.84 w (2.5)	12.93 (0.8)	x	12.66 (0.6)	12.93 (+0.8 m/s)	
5	Jacquelline Gonsales Sá	Brazil	12.75 w (3.9)	x	12.72 (1.5)	12.80 (1.1)	x	x	12.80 (+1.1 m/s)	
6	Mirian Reyes	Peru	12.48 w (2.4)	x	12.53 (1.1)	12.76 (1.0)	x	11.61 (1.9)	12.76 (+1.0 m/s)	
7	Natrena Hooper	Guyana	11.48 (0.7)	12.06 (1.3)	12.50 (1.8)	11.97 w (2.3)	11.80 w (2.2)	11.95 (-0.0)	12.50 (+1.8 m/s)	
8	Ariana Gutiérrez	Venezuela	12.11 w (3.3)	x	x	12.30 (1.6)	x	12.49 (0.9)	12.49 (+0.9 m/s)	

=== Shot put ===
Final – 23 September 14:00h
Humidity (initial/final): 46%/51% – Temperature (initial/final): 26 °C/24 °C

Rank	Name	Nationality	Attempts						Result	Notes
Rank	Name	Nationality	1	2	3	4	5	6	Result	Notes
1st place, gold medalist(s)	Geisa Rafaela Arcanjo	Brazil	18.32	18.43	x	x	17.32	18.06	18.43	
2nd place, silver medalist(s)	Alessandra Gamboa	Peru	15.57	14.94	15.41	15.21	-	15.06	15.57	
3rd place, bronze medalist(s)	Renata Tavares Severiano	Brazil	14.32	14.94	14.33	x	14.88	14.71	14.94	
4	Giohanny Rojas	Venezuela	13.65	14.12	14.07	14.02	13.87	13.99	14.12	
5	Ivana Gallardo	Chile	x	x	x	13.92	x	13.17	13.92	
6	Elizabeth Álvarez	Venezuela	12.33	x	12.26	11.24	12.09	x	12.33	

=== Discus throw ===
Final – 22 September 9:40h
Humidity (initial/final): 54%/52% – Temperature (initial/final): 21 °C/21 °C

Rank	Name	Nationality	Attempts						Result	Notes
Rank	Name	Nationality	1	2	3	4	5	6	Result	Notes
1st place, gold medalist(s)	Andressa Oliveira de Morais	Brazil	x	56.11	56.14	x	57.66	x	57.66	
2nd place, silver medalist(s)	Lidiane Milena Cansian	Brazil	50.05	x	51.09	47.78	49.92	48.68	51.09	
3rd place, bronze medalist(s)	Maia Varela	Argentina	46.01	x	44.15	47.31	44.70	45.83	47.31	
4	Elizabeth Álvarez	Venezuela	46.58	35.57	x	43.62	44.60	42.42	46.58	
5	Ivana Gallardo	Chile	44.99	42.40	43.10	42.33	43.14	44.35	44.99	
6	Rocío Aranda	Argentina	43.00	44.29	43.71	42.77	x	40.36	44.29	
7	Manuela Mendivil	Uruguay	38.21	x	40.33	37.18	37.04	37.47	40.33	

=== Hammer throw ===
Final – 23 September 11:00h
Humidity (initial/final): 48%/42% – Temperature (initial/final): 23 °C/25 °C

Rank	Name	Nationality	Attempts						Result	Notes
Rank	Name	Nationality	1	2	3	4	5	6	Result	Notes
1st place, gold medalist(s)	Zuleima Mina	Ecuador	59.73	x	x	60.87	58.41	62.59	62.59	
2nd place, silver medalist(s)	Mariana Grasielly Marcelino	Brazil	59.66	58.44	56.26	60.38	61.61	61.66	61.66	
3rd place, bronze medalist(s)	Valeria Chiliquinga	Ecuador	56.43	58.63	55.30	56.21	56.97	x	58.63	
4	Larissa Seraphim Ribeiro Câmara	Brazil	x	54.97	56.87	49.70	53.58	55.94	56.87	
5	Daniela Gómez	Argentina	56.07	56.55	x	x	53.49	53.91	56.55	
6	Fátima Ramos	Peru	x	56.30	54.43	55.36	x	54.80	56.30	
7	Génesis Oliveira	Venezuela	52.05	x	55.10	x	x	x	55.10	
8	Paola Miranda	Paraguay	50.05	51.85	53.43	53.11	52.92	x	53.43	
	Rosa Enríquez	Peru	x	x	x	-	-	-	NM	

=== Javelin throw ===
Final – 22 September 15:35h
Humidity (initial/final): 52%/54% – Temperature (initial/final): 21 °C/20 °C

Rank	Name	Nationality	Attempts						Result	Notes
Rank	Name	Nationality	1	2	3	4	5	6	Result	Notes
1st place, gold medalist(s)	Jucilene Sales de Lima	Brazil	51.22	55.75	56.00	x	54.19	54.21	56.00	
2nd place, silver medalist(s)	Maria Conceição Paixão da Silva	Brazil	34.97	43.56	41.62	49.07	44.02	x	49.07	
3rd place, bronze medalist(s)	María Mello	Uruguay	45.95	48.90	48.30	x	45.57	x	48.90	
4	Bárbara López	Argentina	x	42.63	47.02	x	x	x	47.02	

=== Heptathlon ===
Final – 23 September 17:00h
Humidity (initial/final): 52%/54% – Temperature (initial/final): 21 °C/20 °C

The highest mark recorded in each event is highlighted in yellow

Rank	Name	Nationality	100m H	HJ	SP	200m	LJ	JT	800m	Points	Notes
1st place, gold medalist(s)	Vanessa Chefer Spinola	Brazil	14.34 (-0.6); 931pts	1.75; 916pts	13.52; 762pts	24.76 (-0.3); 909pts	5.98 (0.8); 843pts	42.42; 714pts	2:20.00; 824pts	5899	
2nd place, silver medalist(s)	Tamara Alexandrino de Sousa	Brazil	14.11 (-0.6); 963pts	1.75; 916pts	13.64; 770pts	26.75 (-0.3); 733pts	4.96 (1.4); 548pts	37.44; 618pts	3:04.78; 322pts	4870	
3rd place, bronze medalist(s)	Mariza Karabia	Paraguay	15.04 (-0.6); 836pts	1.57; 701pts	10.65; 572pts	27.00 (-0.3); 712pts	5.11 (2.1); 589pts	40.26; 672pts	2:46.68; 499pts	4581	
4	Melissa Arana	Peru	16.18 (-0.6); 692pts	1.51; 632pts	9.49; 496pts	27.23 (-0.3); 693pts	5.22 (2.7); 620pts	32.79; 530pts	2:30.36; 688pts	4351	

=== 20,000 meters walk ===
Final – 23 September 7:00h
Humidity (initial/final): 76%/53% – Temperature (initial/final): 14.0 °C/20.0 °C

Rank	Name	Nationality	Time	Notes
1st place, gold medalist(s)	Yeseida Carrillo	Colombia	1:38:29.5	
2nd place, silver medalist(s)	Wendy Cornejo	Bolivia	1:40:14.2	
3rd place, bronze medalist(s)	Anlly Paola Pineda	Colombia	1:41:04.6	
4	Cleia da Cruz Silva	Brazil	1:51:09.8	
5	Yinfreny Quintero	Venezuela	1:53:40.6	
	Camila da Silva	Brazil	DQ	IAAF Rule 230.6

=== 4x100 meters relay ===
Final – 22 September 18:30h
Humidity (initial/final): 76%/53% – Temperature (initial/final): 14.0 °C/20.0 °C

Rank	Nation	Competitors	Reaction time	Time	Notes
1st place, gold medalist(s)	Chile	Viviana Olivares; Isidora Jiménez; Javiera Errázuriz; Paula Goni	0.247	45.61	
2nd place, silver medalist(s)	Colombia	Janeth Largacha; Yenifer Padilla; Merlin Palacios; Carmen Vergara	0.205	45.66	
3rd place, bronze medalist(s)	Brazil	Thais Evelin da Costa Vides; Vanusa dos Santos; Andressa Moreira Fidelis; Lorena de Araújo Silva Lourenço	0.239	45.88	
4	Venezuela	Génesis Romero; Magdalena Mendoza; Nelsibeth Villalobos; Nercely Soto	0.199	46.61	
	Argentina	Josefina Loyza; María Ayelén Diogo; Evangelina Thomas; Victoria Woodward	0.256	DNF	

=== 4x400 meters relay ===
Final – 23 September 16:15h
Humidity: 70% – Temperature: 19.0 °C

Rank	Nation	Competitors	Time	Notes
1st place, gold medalist(s)	Brazil	Barbara Farias de Oliveira; Dandadeua Asteria de Souza Brites da Silva; Debora dos Santos; Jessica Gonzaga dos Santos	3:41.16	
2nd place, silver medalist(s)	Chile	Javiera Errázuriz; Yaritza Travisani; Paula Goni; Isidora Jiménez	3:42.25	
3rd place, bronze medalist(s)	Argentina	María Ayelén Diogo; Mariana Borelli; Victoria Woodward; Evangelina Thomas	3:58.86	
	Venezuela	Magdalena Mendoza; Estefani Balladares; Nelsibeth Villalobos; Nercely Soto	DNF	
