= Nercely Soto =

Venezuelan sprinter (born 1990)

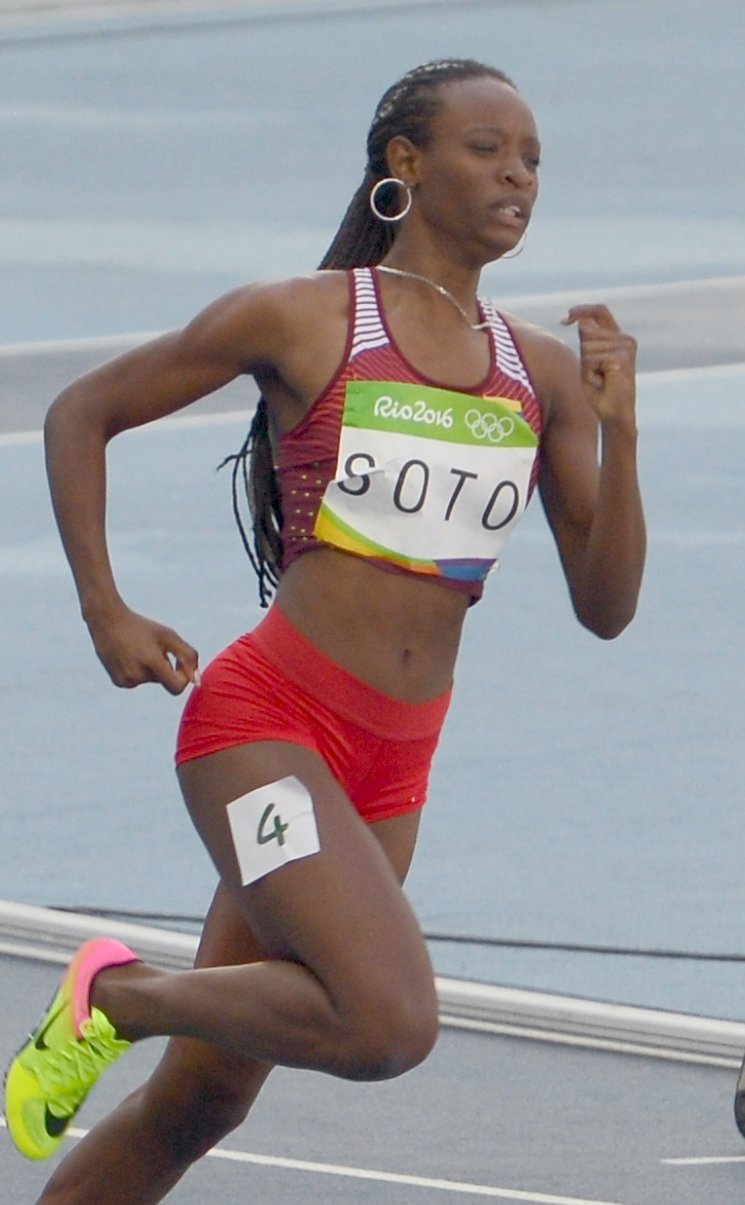
- Nercely Soto in the 200m heat 6, in the olympic game in Rio, 2016

Personal information
- Full name: Nercely Desirée Soto Soto
- Born: August 23, 1990 (age 35) Caja Seca, Zulia, Venezuela
- Height: 1.69 m (5 ft 7 in)
- Weight: 55 kg (121 lb)

Sport
- Country: Venezuela
- Sport: Athletics
- Event: Sprint
- Updated on 29 December 2014

Nercely Desirée Soto Soto (born 23 August 1990 in Caja Seca, Zulia) is a Venezuelan sprinter. At the 2012 Summer Olympics and the 2016 Summer Olympics in Rio, she competed in the Women's 200 metres. In the Rio Summer Olympics she was seventh in Semifinal 3.

== Personal bests ==
- 100 m: 11.49 (wind: +0.7 m/s) – Santiago de Chile, 8 April 2016
- 200 m: 22.53 (wind: +0.1 m/s) – (Venezuela) Caracas, 12 May 2012
- 400 m: 51.94 A – (Peru) Trujillo, 26 November 2013

== International competitions ==
Year	Competition	Venue	Position	Event	Notes
Representing Venezuela
2009	South American Junior Championships	São Paulo, Brazil	5th (h)	100 m	12.62 (+0.5 m/s)
2009	South American Junior Championships	São Paulo, Brazil	6th	200 m	25.20 (+0.2 m/s)
2009	South American Junior Championships	São Paulo, Brazil	5th	4 × 100 m relay	49.92
2009	Bolivarian Games	Sucre, Bolivia	2nd	4 × 100 m relay	44.98 A
2011	ALBA Games	Barquisimeto, Venezuela	5th	200 m	24.48 (+2.0 m/s)
2012	Ibero-American Championships	Barquisimeto, Venezuela	3rd (h)	100 m	12.07 w (+2.5 m/s)
2012	Ibero-American Championships	Barquisimeto, Venezuela	4th	200 m	23.30 (-0.6 m/s)
2012	Ibero-American Championships	Barquisimeto, Venezuela	4th	4 × 100 m relay	44.81
2012	Ibero-American Championships	Barquisimeto, Venezuela	4th	4 × 400 m relay	3:38.99
2012	South American U-23 Championships	São Paulo, Brazil	1st	200 m	23.40 (+1.2 m/s)
2012	South American U-23 Championships	São Paulo, Brazil	2nd	400 m	53.45
2012	South American U-23 Championships	São Paulo, Brazil	4th	4 × 100 m relay	46.61
2012	South American U-23 Championships	São Paulo, Brazil	–	4 × 400 m relay	DNF
2013	South American Championships	Cartagena, Colombia	2nd	200 m	23.05 w (+3.4 m/s)
2013	South American Championships	Cartagena, Colombia	2nd	400 m	53.96
2013	South American Championships	Cartagena, Colombia	3rd	4 × 100 m relay	45.44
2013	South American Championships	Cartagena, Colombia	4th	4 × 400 m relay	3:46.25
2013	Bolivarian Games	Trujillo, Peru	1st	200 m	23.46 (0.0 m/s)
2013	Bolivarian Games	Trujillo, Peru	1st	400 m	51.94
2013	Bolivarian Games	Trujillo, Peru	2nd	4 × 100 m relay	44.16
2014	South American Games	Santiago, Chile	1st	200 m	23.25 (-0.4 m/s)
2014	South American Games	Santiago, Chile	2nd	400 m	52.30
2014	South American Games	Santiago, Chile	1st	4 × 100 m relay	45.08
2014	South American Games	Santiago, Chile	4th	4 × 400 m relay	3:44.20
2014	World Relays	Nassau, Bahamas	17th (h)	4 × 100 m relay	44.64
2014	Pan American Sports Festival	Mexico City, Mexico	8th (h)	400 m	54.89^{1} A
2014	Central American and Caribbean Games	Xalapa, Mexico	1st	200 m	23.14 A (-1.6 m/s)
2014	Central American and Caribbean Games	Xalapa, Mexico	4th	400 m	53.06 A
2014	Central American and Caribbean Games	Xalapa, Mexico	1st	4 × 100 m relay	43.53 A
2014	Central American and Caribbean Games	Xalapa, Mexico	4th	4 × 400 m relay	3:39.08 A
2015	South American Championships	Lima, Peru	1st	200m	23.15 (-0.9 m/s)
2015	South American Championships	Lima, Peru	2nd	400m	54.38
2015	South American Championships	Lima, Peru	1st	4 × 100 m relay	44.28
2015	South American Championships	Lima, Peru	2nd	4 × 400 m relay	3:37.05
2015	World Championships	Beijing, China	25th (h)	200 m	23.16
2016	Ibero-American Championships	Rio de Janeiro, Brazil	1st	200 m	22.95
2016	Ibero-American Championships	Rio de Janeiro, Brazil	3rd	4 × 100 m relay	43.94
2016	Olympic Games	Rio de Janeiro, Brazil	18th (sf)	200 m	22.88
2017	South American Championships	Asunción, Paraguay	4th	200 m	23.06 (w)
2017	South American Championships	Asunción, Paraguay	7th (h)	400 m	56.32^{1}
2017	South American Championships	Asunción, Paraguay	–	4 × 100 m relay	DNF
2017	Bolivarian Games	Santa Marta, Colombia	1st	200 m	22.89
2017	Bolivarian Games	Santa Marta, Colombia	1st	400 m	52.43
2017	Bolivarian Games	Santa Marta, Colombia	1st	4 × 100 m relay	44.15
2017	Bolivarian Games	Santa Marta, Colombia	2nd	4 × 400 m relay	3:40.81
2018	South American Games	Cochabamba, Bolivia	8th (h)	100 m	11.69
2018	South American Games	Cochabamba, Bolivia	3rd	200 m	23.11
2018	South American Games	Cochabamba, Bolivia	1st	4 × 100 m relay	44.71
2018	Central American and Caribbean Games	Barranquilla, Colombia	11th (h)	200 m	24.31^{2}
2018	Central American and Caribbean Games	Barranquilla, Colombia	6th	4 × 100 m relay	45.71
2019	Pan American Games	Lima, Peru	20th (h)	200 m	24.67

^{1}: Did not finish in the final.
^{2}: Disqualified in the semifinals.
