= Guillermo Ruggeri =

Argentine athletics competitor

Personal information
- Born: 26 March 1992 (age 34) Maipú, Argentina
- Height: 1.80 m (5 ft 11 in)
- Weight: 78 kg (172 lb)

Sport
- Sport: Athletics
- Event(s): 400 m hurdles, decathlon
- Club: Club de Gimnasia y Esgrima

Guillermo Manuel Ruggeri Gutila (born 26 March 1992 in Maipú) is an Argentine athlete specialising in the 400 metres hurdles. He represented his country at the 2017 World Championships, reaching the semifinals.

His personal best in the event is 49.28 seconds set in Cochabamba in 2018 which is the current national record. Earlier in his career he competed in the decathlon.

== International competitions ==
Year	Competition	Venue	Position	Event	Notes
Representing Argentina
2012	Ibero-American Championships	Barquisimeto, Venezuela	7th	Decathlon	6853 pts
2012	South American U23 Championships	São Paulo, Brazil	1st	Decathlon	7203 pts
2014	South American Games	Santiago, Chile	3rd	Decathlon	7298 pts
2014	Ibero-American Championships	São Paulo, Brazil	3rd	Decathlon	7274 pts
2014	South American Games	Montevideo, Uruguay	2nd	Decathlon	6887 pts
2016	Ibero-American Championships	Rio de Janeiro, Brazil	5th	Decathlon	6305 pts
2017	South American Championships	Asunción, Paraguay	1st	400 m hurdles	49.72
2017	South American Championships	Asunción, Paraguay	5th	4 × 400 m relay	3:13.96
2017	World Championships	London, United Kingdom	15th (h)	400 m hurdles	49.69^{1}
2017	Universiade	Taipei, Taiwan	10th (sf)	400 m hurdles	50.54
2017	Universiade	Taipei, Taiwan	14th (h)	4 × 100 m relay	40.83
2018	South American Games	Cochabamba, Bolivia	1st	400 m hurdles	49.28
2018	Ibero-American Championships	Trujillo, Peru	6th	400 m hurdles	50.54
2019	South American Championships	Lima, Peru	3rd	400 m hurdles	50.20
2019	Pan American Games	Lima, Peru	5th	400 m hurdles	49.55
2021	South American Championships	Guayaquil, Ecuador	5th	400 m hurdles	51.88

^{1}Disqualified in the semifinals
