= Stephan James (athlete) =

Guyanese sprinter

Personal information
- Born: June 23, 1993 (age 33) Georgetown, Guyana

Sport
- Country: Guyana
- Sport: Athletics
- Event: Sprint
- Updated on 12 December 2014

Stephan James (born 23 June 1993) is a Guyanese athlete in the 400m sprint.

In 2014 he received a two-year scholarship to the ASA College in Brooklyn, New York.

== Personal bests ==
=== Outdoor ===
- 200 m: 20.94 s (wind: +0.5 m/s) – (United States) Mesa, Arizona, 17 May 2014
- 400 m: 46.15 s – (United States) Mesa, Arizona, 17 May 2014

== Achievements ==
Year	Competition	Venue	Position	Event	Notes
Representing Guyana
2011	CARIFTA Games (U20)	Montego Bay, Jamaica	4th (h)	200m	22.58 (wind: -1.2 m/s)
2011	CARIFTA Games (U20)	Montego Bay, Jamaica	4th	400m	48.46
2011	Pan American Junior Championships	Miramar, Florida, United States	5th (h)	200m	21.82 w (wind: +2.5 m/s)
2011	Pan American Junior Championships	Miramar, Florida, United States	6th	400m	48.37
2011	South American Junior Championships	Medellín, Colombia	7th	200m	22.43 A (wind: 0.0 m/s)
2011	South American Junior Championships	Medellín, Colombia	3rd	400m	47.79
2012	CARIFTA Games (U20)	Hamilton, Bermuda	3rd (h)	200m	21.92 (wind: -0.5 m/s)
2012	CARIFTA Games (U20)	Hamilton, Bermuda	6th	400m	49.73
2012	World Junior Championships	Barcelona, Spain	18th (sf)	400m	47.35
2012	South American Under-23 Championships	São Paulo, Brazil	5th	200m	21.41 (wind: +1.2 m/s)
2012	South American Under-23 Championships	São Paulo, Brazil	3rd	400m	46.52
2013	South American Championships	Cartagena, Colombia	7th	200m	21.35 (wind: +1.8 m/s)
2013	South American Championships	Cartagena, Colombia	3rd	400m	46.47
2014	Commonwealth Games	Glasgow, United Kingdom	5th (h)	200m	21.08 (wind: -0.8 m/s)
2014	Commonwealth Games	Glasgow, United Kingdom	7th (sf)	400m	46.35
2014	Commonwealth Games	Glasgow, United Kingdom	–	4 × 100 m relay	DQ
2014	Pan American Sports Festival	Mexico City, Mexico	7th	400m	46.54 A
2014	Central American and Caribbean Games	Xalapa, Mexico	5th (sf)	200m	21.25 A (wind: -0.4 m/s)
2014	Central American and Caribbean Games	Xalapa, Mexico	5th (h)	400m	46.92 A
2014	Central American and Caribbean Games	Xalapa, Mexico	5th	4 × 100 m relay	39.74 A
