= Yeseida Carrillo =

Colombian racewalker

Personal information
- Full name: Yeseida Isaid Carrillo Torres
- Born: 22 October 1993 (age 32) Chía, Colombia

Sport
- Sport: Athletics
- Event: Race walking
Medal record
Representing Colombia
Women's athletics
Event	1st	2nd	3rd
World Team Championships	0	0	1
Pan American Cup	0	1	0
South American U23 Championships	1	0	1
Total	1	1	2
World Team Championships
Bronze medal – third place	2016 Rome	20 km walk (team)
Pan American Cup
Silver medal – second place	2013 Guatemala City	20 km walk (team)
South American U23 Championships
Gold medal – first place	2012 São Paulo	20,000 m walk
Bronze medal – third place	2014 Montevideo	20,000 m walk

Yeseida Isaid Carrillo Torres (born 22 October 1993) is a Colombian race walker. She competed in the women's 20 kilometres walk event at the 2016 Summer Olympics.
