= Aldemir da Silva Júnior =

Brazilian sprinter (born 1992)

Aldemir da Silva Junior
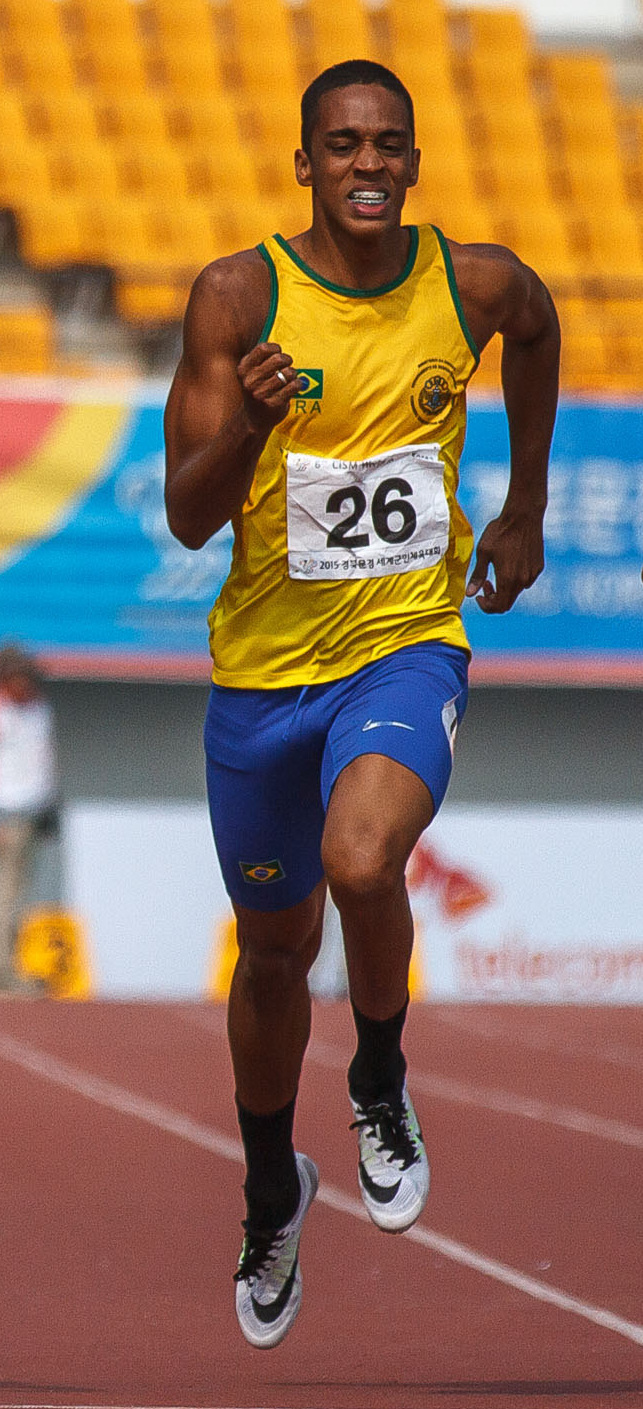
- Aldemir da Silva Júnior at the 2015 Military World Games

Personal information
- Full name: Aldemir Gomes da Silva Júnior
- Born: 8 June 1992 (age 34) Rio de Janeiro, Brazil
- Height: 1.93 m (6 ft 4 in)
- Weight: 88 kg (194 lb)

Sport
- Sport: Running
- Event: Sprints
- Club: CR Vasco da Gama
- Coached by: Vânia da Silva

Achievements and titles
- Personal bests: 100 m: 10.13 (Bragança Paulista 2019); 200 m: 20.15 (São Bernardo do Campo 2017)
Medal record
Men's athletics
Representing Brazil
Pan American Games
Silver medal – second place	2015 Toronto	4×100 m relay
South American Games
Gold medal – first place	2014 Santiago	200 m
Gold medal – first place	2014 Santiago	4×100 m relay
Ibero-American Championships
Gold medal – first place	2012 Barquisimeto	4×100 m relay
Gold medal – first place	2014 São Paulo	4×100 m relay
Silver medal – second place	2012 Barquisimeto	200 m
South American Championships
Gold medal – first place	2017 Asunción	4×100 m relay
South American U-23 Championships
Gold medal – first place	2012 São Paulo	100 m
Gold medal – first place	2012 São Paulo	200 m
Gold medal – first place	2012 São Paulo	4×100 m relay
Gold medal – first place	2014 Montevideo	200 m
Gold medal – first place	2014 Montevideo	4×100 m relay
Silver medal – second place	2014 Montevideo	100 m
South American Junior Championships
Gold medal – first place	2011 Medellín	100 m
Gold medal – first place	2011 Medellín	200 m
Gold medal – first place	2011 Medellín	4×100 m relay
Military World Games
Bronze medal – third place	2015 Mungyeong	200 m
- Updated on 9 October 2015

Aldemir Gomes da Silva Junior (born 8 June 1992) is a Brazilian sprinter.

Da Silva won three gold medals at the 2011 South American Junior Championships in Athletics in Medellín, Colombia.

He won three gold medals at the 2012 South American Under-23 Championships in Athletics in São Paulo, Brazil.

He qualified to represent Brazil at the 2020 Summer Olympics.

== Personal bests ==
- 100 m: 10.13 s (wind: +1.6 m/s) – (Brazil) Bragança Paulista, 29 August 2019
- 200 m: 20.15 s (wind: +1.3 m/s) – (Brazil) São Bernardo do Campo, 11 June 2017
- 200 m: 20.13 s (wind: +2.3 m/s) – (Spain) Segovia, 14 July 2019

== International competitions ==
Year	Competition	Venue	Position	Event	Notes
Representing Brazil
2011	South American Junior Championships	Medellín, Colombia	1st	100 m	10.36 s A (0.0 m/s)
2011	South American Junior Championships	Medellín, Colombia	1st	200 m	20.94 s A (0.0 m/s)
2011	South American Junior Championships	Medellín, Colombia	1st	4 × 100 m relay	39.63 s A
2012	Ibero-American Championships	Barquisimeto, Venezuela	2nd	200 m	20.57 s (-0.9 m/s)
2012	Ibero-American Championships	Barquisimeto, Venezuela	1st	4 × 100 m relay	38.95 s
2012	Olympic Games	London, United Kingdom	16th (sf)	200 m	20.63 s (-0.6 m/s)
2012	Olympic Games	London, United Kingdom	10th (h)	4 × 100 m relay	38.35 s
2012	South American Under-23 Championships	São Paulo, Brazil	1st	100 m	10.42 s (+0.3 m/s)
2012	South American Under-23 Championships	São Paulo, Brazil	1st	200 m	20.51 s (+1.2 m/s)
2012	South American Under-23 Championships	São Paulo, Brazil	1st	4 × 100 m relay	40.10 s
2013	World Championships	Moscow, Russia	26th (h)	200 m	20.73 s (-0.7 m/s)
2014	South American Games	Santiago, Chile	1st	200 m	20.32 s (-1.0 m/s)
2014	South American Games	Santiago, Chile	1st	4 × 100 m relay	38.90 s
2014	Ibero-American Championships	São Paulo, Brazil	4th	200 m	20.62 s (+0.7 m/s)
2014	Ibero-American Championships	São Paulo, Brazil	1st	4 × 100 m relay	39.35 s
2014	South American U23 Championships	Montevideo, Uruguay	2nd	100m	10.47 (+0.3 m/s)
2014	South American U23 Championships	Montevideo, Uruguay	1st	200m	20.50 (+1.4 m/s)
2014	South American U23 Championships	Montevideo, Uruguay	1st	4 × 100 m relay	39.74
2015	World Championships	Beijing, China	36th (h)	200 m	20.59
2015	World Championships	Beijing, China	—	4 × 100 m relay	DNF
2015	Military World Games	Mungyeong, South Korea	3rd	200 m	20.77
2016	Ibero-American Championships	Rio de Janeiro, Brazil	5th	200 m	20.71
2016	Olympic Games	Rio de Janeiro, Brazil	61st (h)	200 m	20.80
2017	South American Championships	Asunción, Paraguay	8th (h)	200 m	21.27^{1}
2017	South American Championships	Asunción, Paraguay	1st	4 × 100 m relay	39.47
2017	World Championships	London, United Kingdom	37th (h)	200 m	20.82
2017	Universiade	Taipei, Taiwan	2nd (h)	200 m	20.92^{2}
2017	Universiade	Taipei, Taiwan	9th (h)	4 × 100 m relay	39.80
2018	South American Games	Cochabamba, Bolivia	5th	100 m	10.32
2018	South American Games	Cochabamba, Bolivia	4th	200 m	20.30
2018	South American Games	Cochabamba, Bolivia	3rd	4 × 100 m relay	39.54
2018	Ibero-American Championships	Trujillo, Peru	2nd	200 m	20.42
2018	Ibero-American Championships	Trujillo, Peru	1st	4 × 100 m relay	38.78
2019	World Championships	Doha, Qatar	23rd (h)	200 m	20.44
2021	Olympic Games	Tokyo, Japan	33rd (h)	200 m	20.84

^{1}Did not start in the final
^{2}Disqualified in the semi-finals
