= Athletics at the 2014 South American Games =

Athletics at the X South American Games
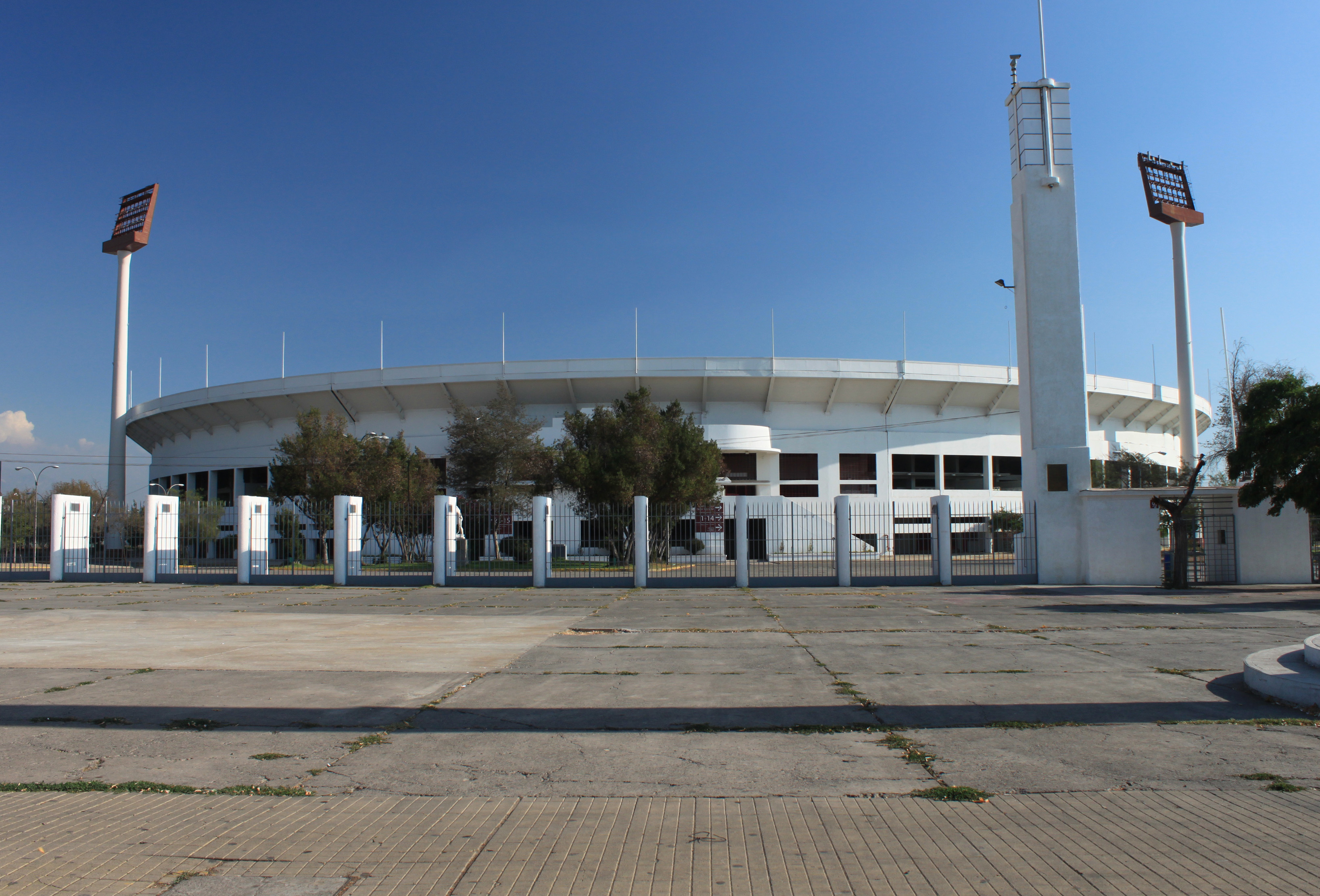
- Estadio Nacional
- Dates: March 13–16
- Host city: Santiago, Chile
- Venue: Estadio Nacional Julio Martínez Prádanos
- Level: Senior
- Events: 44 (22 men, 22 women)
- Participation: 302 athletes from 14 nations
- Records set: 29 games records, 7 national records

Athletics at the 2014 South American Games took place between March 13–16, 2014. The event was held at the Estadio Nacional Julio Martínez Prádanos in Santiago, Chile. A total of 44 events were contested, 22 by men and 22 by women. Detailed reports were given by Eduardo Biscayart for the IAAF. A total of 29 games records (GR), (at least) 7 national records (NR), and 11 world leading marks (best mark worldwide in the current season, WL) were set.

The 2014 athletics competition marked the return of senior athletes to the competition, removing the age limits that had been introduced in 2002 (under-20s) and continued at the 2006 and 2010 games (under-23s). This coincided with increased attendance levels, including many of the region's top level athletes. This raised the calibre of the competition to an elite South American event, which paralleled the status of other continental multi-sport events, such as the Asian Games and All-Africa Games.

Men's discus thrower Rodolfo Casanova of Uruguay gave the sole positive doping test in the athletics events and he was banned for two years.

== Medal summary ==
Medal winners were published.

=== Men ===
| Event | Gold | | Silver | | Bronze | |
|---|---|---|---|---|---|---|
| 100 metres (wind: +1.1 m/s) | Alonso Edward; Panama | 10.23 GR | Jefferson Lucindo; Brazil | 10.30 | Álex Quiñónez; Ecuador | 10.39 |
| 200 metres (wind: -1.0 m/s) | Aldemir da Silva Junior; Brazil | 20.32 GR, WL, PB | Álex Quiñónez; Ecuador | 20.66 | Arturo Ramírez; Venezuela | 20.67 |
| 400 metres | Anderson Henriques; Brazil | 45.03 GR, WL | Hugo de Sousa; Brazil | 45.09 PB | Freddy Mezones; Venezuela | 45.86 |
| 800 metres | Kléberson Davide; Brazil | 1:45.30 GR, WL | Rafith Rodríguez; Colombia | 1:45.39 | Lutimar Paes; Brazil | 1:47.52 |
| 1500 metres | Federico Bruno; Argentina | 3:39.96 GR, PB | Iván López; Chile | 3:42.62 | Rafith Rodríguez; Colombia | 3:42.75 NR |
| 5000 metres | Víctor Aravena; Chile | 14:06.02 | Joilson da Silva; Brazil | 14:07.77 | Javier Carriqueo; Argentina | 14:11.41 |
| 10,000 metres | Bayron Piedra; Ecuador | 28:48.31 GR, SB | Giovani dos Santos; Brazil | 28:53.90 | Diego Colorado; Colombia | 29:10.75 |
| 3000 metres steeplechase | José Peña; Venezuela | 8:36.81 GR, WL | Gerard Giraldo; Colombia | 8:45.96 | Mariano Mastromarino; Argentina | 8:48.11 SB |
| 110 metres hurdles (wind: +0.5 m/s) | Javier McFarlane; Peru | 13.77 PB | Jonathan Mendes; Brazil | 13.81 | Jorge McFarlane; Peru | 13.83 |
| 400 metres hurdles | Andrés Silva; Uruguay | 49.57 GR, WL | Lucirio Francisco Garrido; Venezuela | 49.66 PB | Mahau Suguimati; Brazil | 50.47 |
| High jump | Eure Yánez; Venezuela | 2.21 | Arturo Chávez; Peru | 2.18 | Carlos Layoy; Argentina; Rafael Uchona dos Santos; Brazil | 2.18 |
| Pole vault | Augusto de Oliveira; Brazil | 5.40 | Germán Chiaraviglio; Argentina | 5.35 | Gonzalo Barroilhet; Chile | 5.20 |
| Long jump | Irving Saladino; Panama | 8.16 GR, WL (wind: -0.5 m/s) | Emiliano Lasa; Uruguay | 7.94 NR (wind: +0.5 m/s) | Mauro Vinícius da Silva; Brazil | 7.88 (wind: +0.7 m/s) |
| Triple jump | Jonathan Henrique Silva; Brazil | 16.51 GR (wind: -0.6 m/s) | Jefferson Sabino; Brazil | 16.44 (wind: +0.7 m/s) | Jhon Murillo; Colombia | 16.27 (wind: +0.4 m/s) |
| Shot put | Germán Lauro; Argentina | 20.70 GR, WL | Darlan Romani; Brazil | 19.96 | Aldo González; Bolivia | 18.15 |
| Discus throw | Mauricio Ortega; Colombia | 59.95 GR, NR | Ronald Julião; Brazil | 59.12 | Germán Lauro; Argentina | 58.36 |
| Hammer throw | Wagner Domingos; Brazil | 70.62 | Roberto Sáez; Chile | 67.38 | Juan Ignacio Cerra; Argentina | 66.34 |
| Javelin throw | Víctor Fatecha; Paraguay | 76.09 | Júlio César de Oliveira; Brazil | 75.98 | Dayron Márquez; Colombia | 75.11 |
| Decathlon | Luiz Alberto de Araújo; Brazil | 7733 GR | Gonzalo Barroilhet; Chile | 7617 | Guillermo Ruggeri; Argentina | 7298 PB |
| 20,000 metres Track Walk | Éider Arévalo; Colombia | 1:22:11.1 GR, WL | José Leonardo Montaña; Colombia | 1:22:14.1 SB | Mauricio Arteaga; Ecuador | 1:23:19.3 SB |
| 4 x 100 metres relay | Brazil; Ailson Feitosa; Jefferson Lucindo; Aldemir da Silva Junior; Bruno de Barros | 38.90 GR | Venezuela; Dubeiker Cedeño; Arturo Ramírez; Álvaro Cassiani; Jermaine Chirinos | 39.85 | Colombia; Yeison Rivas; Vladimir Valencia; Daniel Grueso; Jorge Luis Renteria | 40.26 |
| 4 x 400 metres relay | Brazil; Hugo de Sousa; Kléberson Davide; Ailson Feitosa; Anderson Henriques | 3:03.94 GR | Venezuela; Noel Campos; Arturo Ramírez; José Meléndez; Freddy Mezones | 3:04.17 | Colombia; Jhon Perlaza; Jhon Sinisterra; Carlos Lemos; Rafith Rodríguez | 3:10.15 |

=== Women ===
| Event | Gold | | Silver | | Bronze | |
|---|---|---|---|---|---|---|
| 100 metres (wind: -0.1 m/s) | María Alejandra Idrobo; Colombia | 11.62 | Ángela Tenorio; Ecuador | 11.64 | Franciela Krasucki; Brazil | 11.67 |
| 200 metres (wind: -0.4 m/s) | Nercely Soto; Venezuela | 23.25 PB | Ángela Tenorio; Ecuador | 23.66 | Érika Chávez; Ecuador | 23.72 |
| 400 metres | Geisa Coutinho; Brazil | 51.81 | Nercely Soto; Venezuela | 52.30 | Joelma Sousa; Brazil | 52.75 |
| 800 metres | Déborah Rodríguez; Uruguay | 2:06.62 | Mariana Borelli; Argentina | 2:07.57 PB | Christiane dos Santos; Brazil | 2:07.96 |
| 1500 metres | Muriel Coneo; Colombia | 4:15.66 GR | Andrea Ferris; Panama | 4:20.81 | Tatiana Araújo; Brazil | 4:24.59 |
| 5000 metres | Inés Melchor; Peru | 15:51.20 GR | Tatiele de Carvalho; Brazil | 16:04.70 SB | María Peralta; Argentina | 16:15.01 |
| 10000 metres | Inés Melchor; Peru | 33:10.06 GR, WL | Wilma Arizapana; Peru | 33:26.84 | Tatiele de Carvalho; Brazil | 33:39.93 |
| 3000 metres steeplechase | Muriel Coneo; Colombia | 10:05.02 GR | Ángela Figueroa; Colombia | 10:07.02 | Cinthya Paucar; Peru | 10:17.64 |
| 100 metres hurdles (wind: -1.6 m/s) | Yvette Lewis; Panama | 13.11 GR | Lina Flórez; Colombia | 13.29 | Brigitte Merlano; Colombia | 13.30 |
| 400 metres hurdles | Déborah Rodríguez; Uruguay | 56.60 NR, WL | Javiera Errázuriz; Chile | 57.83 | Liliane Fernandes; Brazil | 59.51 |
| High jump | Yulimar Rojas; Venezuela | 1.79 | Kashani Ríos; Panama | 1.76 | Guillercy González; Venezuela | 1.76 |
| Pole vault | Fabiana Murer; Brazil | 4.40 GR | Robeilys Peinado; Venezuela | 4.20 | Karla Rosa da Silva; Brazil | 4.10 |
| Long jump | Keila Costa; Brazil | 6.35 (wind: +0.5 m/s) | Jéssica dos Reis; Brazil | 6.32 (wind: +1.4 m/s) | Yuliana Angulo; Ecuador | 6.10 SB (wind: +0.5 m/s) |
| Triple jump | Keila Costa; Brazil | 13.65 (wind: -1.5 m/s) | Gisele de Oliveira; Brazil | 13.08 (wind: +0.8 m/s) | Silvana Segura; Peru | 13.07 (wind: +1.1 m/s) |
| Shot put | Natalia Ducó; Chile | 18.07 GR | Ahymará Espinoza; Venezuela | 17.63 PB | Sandra Lemos; Colombia | 17.20 |
| Discus throw | Karen Gallardo; Chile | 59.65 GR | Rocío Comba; Argentina | 59.29 | Fernanda Raquel Borges; Brazil | 56.08 |
| Hammer throw | Rosa Rodríguez; Venezuela | 68.61 GR, SB | Jennifer Dahlgren; Argentina | 67.94 | Johana Moreno; Colombia | 65.58 |
| Javelin throw | Flor Ruiz; Colombia | 60.59 GR, SB | Jucilene de Lima; Brazil | 60.17 | Laila Ferrer e Silva; Brazil | 57.11 |
| Heptathlon | Ana Camila Pirelli; Paraguay | 5669 GR | Fiorella Chiappe; Argentina | 5568 PB | Guillercy González; Venezuela | 5509 PB |
| 20,000 metres Track Walk | Sandra Arenas; Colombia | 1:31:46.9 AR, GR, WL | Sandra Galvis; Colombia | 1:34:04.4 | Érica de Sena; Brazil | 1:36:37.3 |
| 4 x 100 metres relay | Venezuela; Lexabeth Hidalgo; Wilmary Álvarez; Nelsibeth Villalobos; Nercely Soto | 45.08 | Chile; Josefina Gutiérrez; Isidora Jiménez; Fernanda Mackenna; Daniela Riderelli | 45.09 NR | Colombia; Lina Flórez; María Alejandra Idrobo; Jennifer Padilla; Eliecith Palacios | 45.13 |
| 4 x 400 metres relay | Brazil; Joelma Sousa; Wanessa Zavolski; Liliane Fernandes; Geisa Coutinho | 3:35.07 GR | Colombia; María Alejandra Idrobo; Yadira Moreno; Jennifer Padilla; Evelis Aguilar | 3:35.96 | Chile; Isidora Jiménez; Paula Goñi; Javiera Errázuriz; Fernanda Mackenna | 3:37.42 NR |

== Medal table ==
The medal count was published.

* Host nation (Chile)

| Rank | Nation | Gold | Silver | Bronze | Total |
|---|---|---|---|---|---|
| 1 | Brazil | 14 | 13 | 14 | 41 |
| 2 | Colombia | 7 | 7 | 10 | 24 |
| 3 | Venezuela | 6 | 6 | 4 | 16 |
| 4 | Chile* | 3 | 5 | 2 | 10 |
| 5 | Peru | 3 | 2 | 3 | 8 |
| 6 | Panama | 3 | 2 | 0 | 5 |
| 7 | Uruguay | 3 | 1 | 0 | 4 |
| 8 | Argentina | 2 | 5 | 7 | 14 |
| 9 | Paraguay | 2 | 0 | 0 | 2 |
| 10 | Ecuador | 1 | 3 | 4 | 8 |
| 11 | Bolivia | 0 | 0 | 1 | 1 |
| Totals (11 entries) | | 44 | 44 | 45 | 133 |

== Team scores ==
Team scores were published.

The host country is highlighted in lavender blue

| Rank | Nation | Points |
|---|---|---|
| 1st place, gold medalist(s) | Brazil | 363.5 |
| 2nd place, silver medalist(s) | Chile | 244 |
| 3rd place, bronze medalist(s) | Colombia | 234.5 |
| 4 | Venezuela | 162 |
| 5 | Argentina | 158 |
| 6 | Ecuador | 96 |
| 7 | Peru | 78 |
| 8 | Panama | 45 |
| 9 | Uruguay | 43 |
| 10 | Paraguay | 28 |
| 11 | Bolivia | 20 |
| 12 | Suriname | 13 |
| 13 | Guyana | 7 |

== Participation ==
Participation of 317 athletes (172 men, 145 women) from 14 countries was reported.

- Argentina (27)
- Aruba (1)
- Bolivia (10)
- Brazil (63)
- Chile (65)
- Colombia (39)
- Ecuador (23)
- Guyana (5)
- Panama (8)
- Paraguay (6)
- Peru (11)
- Suriname (5)
- Uruguay (7)
- Venezuela (32)
