= 2012 South American Under-23 Championships in Athletics =

V South American Under-23 Championships in Athletics
- Dates: September 22–23
- Host city: São Paulo, Brazil
- Venue: Estádio Ícaro de Castro Melo
- Level: U-23
- Events: 44
- Participation: 240 athletes from 12 nations
- Records set: 13 championships records

The 2012 South American Under-23 Championships in Athletics were held in São Paulo, Brazil, at the Estádio Ícaro de Castro Melo from 22 to 23 September 2012. They were the 5th edition of the competition, organised under the supervision of the CONSUDATLE. A detailed report on the results was given. Brazilian shot putters Geisa Arcanjo who achieved 18.43m in the women's event, and Darlan Romani who achieved 19.93m in the men's event, were awarded the title for the best performance of the event.

== Participation ==
A total of 240 athletes from 12 nations participated at the championships. Other sources count only 236 athletes. An unofficial count through the result lists resulted in 234 participating athletes:

- Argentina (27)
- Bolivia (6)
- Brazil (75)
- Chile (21)
- Colombia (28)
- Ecuador (8)
- Guyana (4)
- Panama (2)
- Paraguay (7)
- Peru (20)
- Uruguay (11)
- Venezuela (25)

Suriname was the only CONSUDATLE member federation absent.

== Records ==
A total of 13 new championships records were set.

== Medal summary ==
Complete results were published.

=== Men ===
Event	Gold		Silver		Bronze	
100 metres (0.3 m/s)	Aldemir da Silva Junior (BRA)	10.42	Isidro Montoya (COL)	10.45	Chavez Ageday (GUY)	10.65
200 metres (1.2 m/s)	Aldemir da Silva Junior (BRA)	20.51 CR	Bernardo Baloyes (COL)	20.87	Arturo Ramírez (VEN)	21.00
400 metres	Pedro Luiz de Oliveira (BRA)	45.52 CR	Arturo Ramírez (VEN)	46.20	Stephan James (GUY)	46.52
800 metres	Tomás Squella (CHI)	1:48.06	David Díaz Franco (ARG)	1:48.34	Lucirio Antonio Garrido (VEN)	1:48.60
1500 metres	Federico Bruno (ARG)	3:47.13	Iván López (CHI)	3:48.07	Carlos Díaz (CHI)	3:50.01
5000 metres	Víctor Aravena (CHI)	14:16.25	Federico Bruno (ARG)	14:24.21	Daniel Toroya (BOL)	14:29.30
10000 metres	Víctor Aravena (CHI)	30:31.93	José Luis Rojas (PER)	30:32.82	Wily Canchanya (PER)	30:33.11
3000 m steeplechase	Alexis Peña (VEN)	8:53.42	Jean Carlos Machado (BRA)	8:54.53	Joaquín Arbe (ARG)	8:55.90
110 m hurdles (–0.9 m/s)	João Vitor de Oliveira (BRA)	14.14	Robson Braga (BRA)	14.28	Jefferson Valencia (COL)	14.57
400 m hurdles	Hederson Estefani (BRA)	51.02	Alejandro Chala (ECU)	51.11	Vinícius Guimarães (BRA)	51.69
High jump	Talles Frederico Silva (BRA)	2.21 CR	Carlos Layoy (ARG)	2.19	Rafael Uchona dos Santos (BRA)	2.16
Pole vault	Matheus da Silva (BRA)	5.05	Rubén Benítez (ARG)	5.00	Daniel Zupeuc (CHI)	4.80
Long jump	Rebert Firmiano (BRA)	7.96 (3.0 m/s)	Higor Alves (BRA)	7.72 (2.3 m/s)	Emiliano Lasa (URU)	7.63 (2.7 m/s)
Triple jump	Jonathan Henrique Silva (BRA)	16.19 (2.4 m/s)	Jean Rosa (BRA)	15.68 (2.7 m/s)	Edwin Murillo (COL)	15.37 (0.5 m/s)
Shot put	Darlan Romani (BRA)	19.93 CR	Willian Braido (BRA)	18.85	Joaquín Ballivián (CHI)	17.28
Discus throw	Mauricio Ortega (COL)	53.94	Felipe Lorenzon (BRA)	51.71	Thiago Negreiros (BRA)	51.48
Hammer throw	Allan Wolski (BRA)	63.20	Hevertt Álvarez (CHI)	61.18	Pedro da Costa (BRA)	60.84
Javelin throw	Braian Toledo (ARG)	78.49 CR	Tomás Guerra (CHI)	71.30	Paulo Enrique da Silva (BRA)	71.23
Decathlon	Guillermo Ruggeri (ARG)	7203	Ricardo Herrada (VEN)	6930	Óscar Campos (VEN)	6878
20000 m walk	Caio Bonfim (BRA)	1:23:22.83 CR	José Leonardo Montaña (COL)	1:23:41.57	Richard Vargas (VEN)	1:29:46.67
4 x 100 metres relay	Brazil; Jackson da Silva; Jorge Vides; Aldemir da Silva Junior; Eric de Jesus	40.10	Colombia; Jefferson Valencia; Bernardo Baloyes; Roberto Murillo; Isidro Montoya	40.14	Argentina; Matías Robledo; Fabio Martínez; Lucas Semino; Rubén Benítez	40.82
4 x 400 metres relay	Brazil; Anderson Machado dos Santos; Willian Carvalho; Jonathan da Silva; Pedro Luiz de Oliveira	3:07.44	Venezuela; Noel Campos; Lucirio Antonio Garrido; Cleiderman Medina; Arturo Ramírez	3:08.56	Peru; Jordy Portilla; Andy Martínez; Edmundo Díaz; Paulo Herrera	3:14.18

=== Women ===
Event	Gold		Silver		Bronze	
100 metres (0.5 m/s)	Vanusa dos Santos (BRA)	11.72	Merlin Palacios (COL)	11.85	Victoria Woodward (ARG)	11.88
200 metres (1.2 m/s)	Nercely Soto (VEN)	23.40	Isidora Jiménez (CHI)	23.63	Vanusa dos Santos (BRA)	23.79
400 metres	Jennifer Padilla (COL)	53.12 CR	Nercely Soto (VEN)	53.45	Jéssica dos Santos (BRA)	54.22
800 metres	Jéssica dos Santos (BRA)	2:07.42	Evangelina Thomas (ARG)	2:08.15	Andrea Calderón (ECU)	2:08.51
1500 metres	Erika Lima (BRA)	4:26.29	Thayra dos Santos (BRA)	4:30.09	Evangelina Thomas (ARG)	4:35.54
5000 metres	Yony Ninahuamán (PER)	16:50.21	Adriana da Luz (BRA)	16:50.43	Florencia Borelli (ARG)	17:00.04
10000 metres	Florencia Borelli (ARG)	35:29.08	Adriana da Luz (BRA)	35:37.32	Valdilene Silva (BRA)	35:54.22
3000 m steeplechase	Zulema Arenas (PER)	10:14.52 CR	Yony Ninahuamán (PER)	10:27.75	Tatiane da Silva (BRA)	10:45.08
100 m hurdles (–1.7 m/s)	Nelsibeth Villalobos (VEN)	14.48	Genesis Romero (VEN)	14.58	Gabriela Lima (BRA)	14.65
400 m hurdles	Déborah Rodríguez (URU)	57.63 CR	Magdalena Mendoza (VEN)	58.09	Débora dos Santos (BRA)	59.14
High jump	Kashani Ríos (PAN)	1.76	Nulfa Palacios (COL)	1.73	Yulimar Rojas (VEN)	1.73
Pole vault	Sara Pereira (BRA)	3.90	Maira Silva (BRA)	3.80	María Victoria Fernández (CHI)	3.75
Long jump	Jéssica dos Reis (BRA)	6.18 (1.5 m/s)	Nelsibeth Villalobos (VEN)	6.09 (1.0 m/s)	Josefina Loyza (ARG)	6.03 (1.5 m/s)
Triple jump	Giselly Landázury (COL)	13.31 (1.5 m/s)	Yudelsi González (VEN)	13.13 (2.5 m/s)	Silvana Segura (PER)	13.13 (1.7 m/s)
Shot put	Geisa Arcanjo (BRA)	18.43	Alessandra Gamboa (PER)	15.57	Renata Severiano (BRA)	14.94
Discus throw	Andressa de Morais (BRA)	57.66 CR	Lidiane Cansian (BRA)	51.09	Maia Varela (ARG)	47.31
Hammer throw	Zuleima Mina (ECU)	62.59	Mariana Marcelino (BRA)	61.66	Valeria Chiliquinga (ECU)	58.63
Javelin throw	Jucilene de Lima (BRA)	56.00	Maria Conceição da Silva (BRA)	49.07	María Mello (URU)	48.90
Heptathlon	Vanessa Spínola (BRA)	5899 CR	Tamara de Sousa (BRA)	4870	Mariza Karabia (PAR)	4581
20000 m walk	Yeseida Carrillo (COL)	1:38:29.51 CR	Wendy Cornejo (BOL)	1:40:14.28	Anlly Pineda (COL)	1:41:04.69
4 x 100 metres relay	Chile; Viviana Olivares; Isidora Jiménez; Javiera Errázuriz; Paula Goñi	45.61	Colombia; Janeth Largacha; Jennifer Padilla; Merlin Palacios; Carmen Vergara	45.66	Brazil; Thaís Vides; Vanusa dos Santos; Andressa Fidélis; Lorena Lourenço	45.88
4 x 400 metres relay	Brazil; Bárbara de Oliveira; Dandadeua da Silva; Débora dos Santos; Jéssica dos Santos	3:41.16	Chile; Javiera Errázuriz; Yaritza Travisani; Paula Goñi; Isidora Jiménez	3:42.25	Argentina; María Ayelen Diogo; Mariana Borelli; Victoria Woodward; Evangelina Thomas	3:58.86

== Medal table ==
The host country is highlighted in lavender blue

* Host nation (Brazil)

Rank	Nation	Gold	Silver	Bronze	Total
1	Brazil*	24	14	13	51
2	Colombia	4	7	3	14
3	Argentina	4	5	8	17
4	Chile	4	5	4	13
5	Venezuela	3	8	5	16
6	Peru	2	3	3	8
7	Ecuador	1	1	2	4
8	Uruguay	1	0	2	3
9	Panama	1	0	0	1
10	Bolivia	0	1	1	2
11	Guyana	0	0	2	2
12	Paraguay	0	0	1	1
Totals (12 entries)		44	44	44	132

== Points table ==
The host country is highlighted in lavender blue

Rank	Nation	Points
1st place, gold medalist(s)	Brazil	494
2nd place, silver medalist(s)	Argentina	151
3rd place, bronze medalist(s)	Venezuela	138
4	Colombia	137
5	Chile	132
6	Peru	71
7	Ecuador	34
8	Uruguay	18
9	Paraguay	13
9	Bolivia	13
11	Guyana	11
12	Panama	10

=== Men ===
Rank	Nation	Points
1st place, gold medalist(s)	Brazil	250
2nd place, silver medalist(s)	Argentina	97
3rd place, bronze medalist(s)	Chile	82
4	Venezuela	64
4	Colombia	62
6	Peru	26
7	Ecuador	16
8	Guyana	11
9	Bolivia	7
10	Uruguay	4
11	Paraguay	2

=== Women ===
Rank	Nation	Points
1st place, gold medalist(s)	Brazil	244
2nd place, silver medalist(s)	Colombia	75
3rd place, bronze medalist(s)	Venezuela	74
4	Argentina	54
5	Chile	50
6	Peru	45
7	Ecuador	18
8	Uruguay	14
9	Paraguay	11
10	Panama	10
11	Bolivia	6
