= Arturo Ramírez =

Venezuelan sprinter (born 1991)

Personal information
- Full name: Arturo José Ramírez Álvarez
- Born: 19 April 1991 (age 35) San Juan de los Morros, Venezuela
- Height: 1.84 m (6 ft 0 in)
- Weight: 79 kg (174 lb)

Sport
- Country: Venezuela
- Sport: Athletics
- Updated on 12 December 2014

Arturo José Ramírez Álvarez (born 19 April 1991) is a Venezuelan sprinter. He competed in the 4 × 400 m relay event at the 2012 Summer Olympics and 2016 Summer Olympics.

== Personal bests ==
- 100 m: 10.41 s A (wind: +0.4 m/s) – (Mexico) Xalapa, 24 November 2014
- 200 m: 20.67 s (wind: -1.0 m/s) – (Chile) Santiago, 15 March 2014
- 400 m: 45.84 s – (Venezuela) Barquisimeto, 8 June 2012

== International competitions ==
Year	Competition	Venue	Position	Event	Notes
Representing Venezuela
2009	ALBA Games	Havana, Cuba	4th	200 m	21.57 w (+2.3 m/s)
2009	South American Championships	Lima, Peru	9th (h)	200 m	21.75 A (-0.2 m/s)
2009	Central American and Caribbean Championships	Havana, Cuba	7th	4x100 m	40.18
2009	South American Junior Championships	São Paulo, Brazil	4th	100 m	10.69 (+0.4 m/s)
2009	South American Junior Championships	São Paulo, Brazil	3rd	200 m	21.66 (-0.3 m/s)
2009	South American Junior Championships	São Paulo, Brazil	3rd	4x100 m	41.49
2009	Pan American Junior Championships	Port of Spain, Trinidad and Tobago	5th (h)	100 m	10.73 w (+2.6 m/s)
2009	Pan American Junior Championships	Port of Spain, Trinidad and Tobago	4th (h)	200 m	22.02
2009	Bolivarian Games	Sucre, Bolivia	2nd	100 m	10.28 w A (+2.6 m/s)
2009	Bolivarian Games	Sucre, Bolivia	1st	200 m	20.78 A (+0.0 m/s)
2009	Bolivarian Games	Sucre, Bolivia	2nd	4x100 m	39.74 A
2010	South American Under-23 Championships South American Games	Medellín, Colombia	1st	200 m	20.99 A (+1.3 m/s)
2010	South American Under-23 Championships South American Games	Medellín, Colombia	2nd	4x100 m	40.22 A
2010	South American Under-23 Championships South American Games	Medellín, Colombia	1st	4x400 m	3:06.53 A
2010	Ibero-American Championships	San Fernando, Spain	4th (h)	200 m	21.61 (-0.6 m/s)
2010	Ibero-American Championships	San Fernando, Spain	3rd	4x400 m	3:05.53
2010	Central American and Caribbean; Junior Championships (U-20)	Santo Domingo, Dominican Republic	4th	100 m	10.69 (-1.4 m/s)
2010	Central American and Caribbean; Junior Championships (U-20)	Santo Domingo, Dominican Republic	3rd	200 m	21.71 (-2.4 m/s)
2010	World Junior Championships	Moncton, Canada	22nd (sf)	200 m	21.80 w (+2.3 m/s)
2011	Central American and Caribbean Championships	Mayagüez, Puerto Rico	4th (h)	200 m	21.31 (+0.9 m/s)
2011	Central American and Caribbean Championships	Mayagüez, Puerto Rico	6th	4x400 m	3:04.93
2011	ALBA Games	Barquisimeto, Venezuela	7th	400 m	47.60
2011	ALBA Games	Barquisimeto, Venezuela	1st	4x400 m	3:04.83
2011	Pan American Games	Guadalajara, Mexico	3rd	4x400 m	3:00.82 A NR
2012	Ibero-American Championships	Barquisimeto, Venezuela	3rd	400 m	45.84
2012	Ibero-American Championships	Barquisimeto, Venezuela	2nd	4x100 m	39.01
2012	Ibero-American Championships	Barquisimeto, Venezuela	2nd	4x400 m	3:01.70
2012	Olympic Games	London, United Kingdom	7th	4x400 m	3:02.18
2012	South American Under-23 Championships	São Paulo, Brazil	3rd	200 m	21.00 (+1.2 m/s)
2012	South American Under-23 Championships	São Paulo, Brazil	2nd	400 m	46.20
2012	South American Under-23 Championships	São Paulo, Brazil	—	4x100 m	DNF
2012	South American Under-23 Championships	São Paulo, Brazil	2nd	4x400 m	3:08.56
2013	South American Championships	Cartagena, Colombia	4th	200 m	20.72 (+1.8 m/s)
2013	South American Championships	Cartagena, Colombia	1st	4×400 m	3:03.64
2013	World Championships	Moscow, Russia	9th (h)	4×400 m	3:02.04
2014	South American Games	Santiago, Chile	3rd	200 m	20.67 (-0.1 m/s)
2014	South American Games	Santiago, Chile	2nd	4×100 m	39.85
2014	South American Games	Santiago, Chile	2nd	4×400 m	3:04.17
2014	IAAF World Relays	Nassau, Bahamas	17th (h)	4×100 m	39.29
2014	IAAF World Relays	Nassau, Bahamas	6th	4×400 m	3:01.44
2014	Central American and Caribbean Games	Xalapa, Mexico	4th (h)	100 m	10.41 A (+0.4 m/s)
2014	Central American and Caribbean Games	Xalapa, Mexico	6th	200 m	21.00 A (-1.8 m/s)
2014	Central American and Caribbean Games	Xalapa, Mexico	3rd	4x100 m	39.22 A
2015	South American Championships	Lima, Peru	2nd	4x100 m	40.19
2015	Pan American Games	Toronto, Canada	18th (h)	200 m	20.74 (w)
2015	Pan American Games	Toronto, Canada	7th	4x400 m	3:03.47
2015	World Championships	Beijing, China	14th (h)	4x400 m	3:02.96
2016	Ibero-American Championships	Rio de Janeiro, Brazil	8th	200 m	21.13
2016	Ibero-American Championships	Rio de Janeiro, Brazil	3rd	4x400 m	3:03.61
2016	Olympic Games	Rio de Janeiro, Brazil	12th (h)	4x400 m	3:02.69
2017	South American Championships	Asunción, Paraguay	3rd	4x100 m	39.74
2017	Bolivarian Games	Santa Marta, Colombia	6th	200 m	21.25
2017	Bolivarian Games	Santa Marta, Colombia	1st	4x100 m	39.40
2018	South American Games	Cochabamba, Bolivia	8th (h)	100 m	10.45
2018	South American Games	Cochabamba, Bolivia	2nd	4x100 m	39.03
2018	Central American and Caribbean Games	Barranquilla, Colombia	18th (h)	200 m	21.63
2018	Central American and Caribbean Games	Barranquilla, Colombia	7th	4x100 m	39.63
