= Federico Bruno =

Argentine middle-distance runner (born 1993)

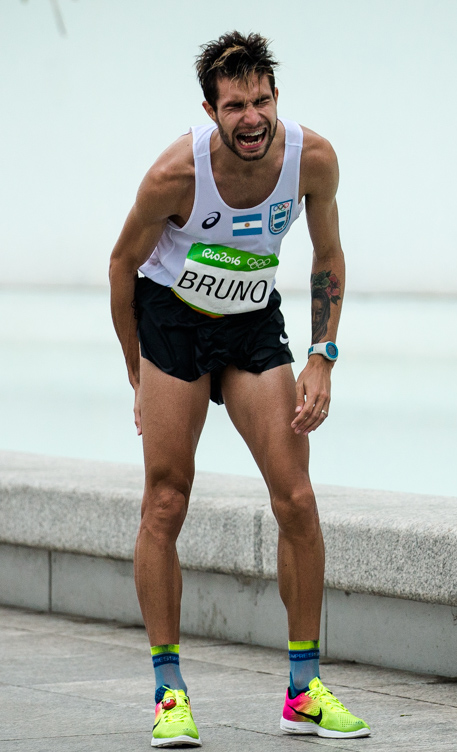
- Bruno at the 2016 Olympics

Personal information
- Born: June 18, 1993 (age 33) Concordia, Entre Ríos
- Height: 1.85 m (6 ft 1 in)
- Weight: 66 kg (146 lb)

Sport
- Sport: Athletics
- Events: Middle-distance running, Long-distance running
Medal record
Men's athletics
Representing Argentina
South American Games
Gold medal – first place	2014 Santiago	1500 m
Disqualified	2022 Asunción	1500 m
Disqualified	2022 Asunción	5000 m
Bronze medal – third place	2018 Cochabamba	1500 m
South American Championships
Silver medal – second place	2013 Cartagena	1500 m
Silver medal – second place	2015 Lima	1500 m
Bronze medal – third place	2011 Buenos Aires	1500 m
- Updated on 28 March 2014

Federico Bruno (born 18 June 1993) is an Argentine middle- and long-distance runner. He is 1.85 m (6 ft 1 in) and weighs 66 kilograms (146 lb). He was the winner of the 1500 metres at the 2014 South American Games and is a three-time medallist over the distance at the South American Championships in Athletics.

Bruno is currently serving a six-year ban set to end in 2029 in relation to an anti-doping rule violation after testing positive for EPO in 2022.

== Career ==
Bruno was born in Concordia, Entre Ríos, and made his international debut at the 2008 South American Youth Championships in Athletics, where he came fourth in the 1500 metres. An appearance at the 2009 World Youth Championships in Athletics followed, but he failed to make it past the first round. He entered the 3000 metres for Argentina at the 2010 Summer Youth Olympics and placed fifth in the "B" final. That same year, he ran a series of personal bests: 3:47.35 minutes for the 1500 m (a national junior record), 8:23.51 minutes for the 3000 m and 14:38.70 minutes for the 5000 metres.

He failed to finish at the junior race at the 2011 South American Cross Country Championships in February. Despite this, he won a senior bronze medal in the 1500 m at the 2011 South American Championships in Athletics held in Buenos Aires, running a near personal best time of 3:47.81 minutes. He did not match this form at the 2011 Pan American Junior Athletics Championships and came fourth, missing a medal by a fraction of a second. Bruno topped the podium at the 2011 South American Junior Championships in Athletics and also managed eighth in the 800 metres. His long season came to an end in October when he ran to 13th place in the 1500 m at the Pan American Games.

In May 2012 he ran four minutes for the mile to take bronze at the South American Road Mile Championships, then established a South American junior record in the 1500 m with a run of 3:40.86 minutes (breaking the long-standing mark of multiple South American record holder Hudson de Souza. He made the final at the 2012 World Junior Championships in Athletics, but finished in last place, failing to match his time from the qualifying round. He established himself as one of the region's best young runners at the 2012 South American Under-23 Championships in Athletics, winning the 1500 m and taking a silver medal in the 5000 m behind Víctor Aravena.

In the 2013 season, Bruno improved his bests to 1:49.98 for the 800 m, 3:40.67 for the 1500 m and 7:56.98 for the 3000 m. He progressed in the senior ranks with a silver medal in the 1500 m at the 2013 South American Championships in Athletics. At the start of 2014 a personal best and games record of 3:39.96 minutes earned him the 1500 m gold medal at the South American Games, at which he also came fourth in the 5000 m.

In September 2024, Bruno was served with a six-year ban backdated to July 2023 in relation to an anti-doping rule violation for testing positive for EPO during 2022. All of his results were disqualified from 12 October 2022 onwards, including his two gold medals at the 2022 South American Games in 1500m and 5000m events.

== Personal bests ==
- 800 metres – 1:49.98 (2013)
- 1500 metres – 3:36.18 (2021)
- 3000 metres – 7:54.34 (2015)
- 5000 metres – 13:11.57 (2023)
- 10000 metres – 29:44.87 (2014)
- 10K – 29:23 (2016)
- Half Marathon – 1:02:10 (2022)
- Marathon - 2:15:40 (2016)

== Achievements ==
Representing Argentina
2008	South American Youth Championships	Lima, Peru	4th	1500 m	4:02.93
2009	World Youth Championships	Bressanone, Italy	13th (h)	1500 m	4:06.95
2010	Summer Youth Olympics	Singapore, Singapore	16th	3000 m	8:58.63
2011	South American Cross Country Championships	Asunción, Paraguay	—	8 km	DNF
2011	South American Championships	Buenos Aires, Argentina	3rd	1500 m	3:47.81
2011	Pan American Junior Championships	Miramar, United States	4th	1500 m	3:53.94
2011	Pan American Junior Championships	Miramar, United States	8th	800 m	1:54.55
2011	South American Junior Championships	Medellín, Colombia	1st	1500 m	3:53.04
2011	Pan American Games	Guadalajara, Mexico	13th	1500 m	4:01.09 A
2012	South American Road Mile Championships	Belém, Brazil	3rd	One Mile	4:00
2012	World Junior Championships	Barcelona, Spain	12th	1500 m	3:55.38
2012	South American Under-23 Championships	São Paulo, Brazil	1st	1500 m	3:47.13
2012	South American Under-23 Championships	São Paulo, Brazil	2nd	5000 m	14:24.21
2013	South American Championships	Cartagena, Colombia	2nd	1500 m	3:45.94
2014	Maratón Internacional de Reyes Concordia	Concordia, Argentina	1st	10,000 m	30:26.00
2014	South American Games	Santiago, Chile	1st	1500 m	3:39.96
2014	South American Games	Santiago, Chile	4th	5000 m	14:11.55
2015	South American Championships	Lima, Peru	2nd	1500 m	3:42.21
2015	South American Championships	Lima, Peru	2nd	5000 m	14:06.25
2015	Pan American Games	Toronto, Canada	6th	1500 m	3:42.88
2015	Pan American Games	Toronto, Canada	–	5000 m	DNF
2016	Olympic Games	Rio de Janeiro, Brazil	136th	Marathon	2:40:05
2017	South American Championships	Asunción, Paraguay	1st	1500 m	3:45.28
2017	World Championships	London, United Kingdom	19th (h)	1500 m	3:43.16
2018	World Indoor Championships	Birmingham, United Kingdom	13th (h)	3000 m	7:58.98
2018	South American Games	Cochabamba, Bolivia	3rd	1500 m	3:54.34
2019	Pan American Games	Lima, Peru	5th	1500 m	3:43.17
2019	Pan American Games	Lima, Peru	4th	5000 m	13:55.75
2020	South American Indoor Championships	Cochabamba, Bolivia	1st	1500 m	3:56.88
2020	South American Indoor Championships	Cochabamba, Bolivia	–	3000 m	DNF
2021	South American Championships	Guayaquil, Ecuador	2nd	1500 m	3:38.25
2022	World Indoor Championships	Belgrade, Serbia	11th (h)	1500 m	3:39.34
2022	South American Games	Asunción, Paraguay	DQ ~~1st~~	1500 m	~~3:40.90~~
2022	South American Games	Asunción, Paraguay	DQ ~~1st~~	5000 m	~~13:54.79~~
