= Mariana Borelli =

Argentine middle-distance runner

Personal information
- Born: 30 October 1992 (age 33)

Sport
- Sport: Athletics
- Event(s): 800 m, 1500 m

Mariana Borelli (born 30 October 1992) is an Argentine middle-distance runner. She has won several medals at a regional level.

Her twin sister, Florencia Borelli, is also a runner.

== International competitions ==
Year	Competition	Venue	Position	Event	Notes
Representing Argentina
2011	South American Championships	Buenos Aires, Argentina	8th	800 m	2:09.59
2011	Pan American Junior Championships	Miramar, United States	8th	800 m	2:17.28
2011	South American Junior Championships	Medellín, Colombia	5th	800 m	2:13.39
2011	South American Junior Championships	Medellín, Colombia	3rd	4 × 400 m relay	3:56.53
2012	South American U23 Championships	São Paulo, Brazil	4th	800 m	2:09.44
2012	South American U23 Championships	São Paulo, Brazil	3rd	4 × 400 m relay	3:58.86
2013	South American Championships	Cartagena, Colombia	5th	800 m	2:08.96
2013	South American Championships	Cartagena, Colombia	11th	1500 m	4:38.30
2014	South American Games	Santiago, Chile	2nd	800 m	2:07.57
2014	South American Games	Santiago, Chile	4th	1500 m	4:26.94
2014	Ibero-American Championships	São Paulo, Brazil	5th	800 m	2:06.96
2014	Ibero-American Championships	São Paulo, Brazil	9th	1500 m	4:24.13
2014	South American U23 Championships	Montevideo, Uruguay	3rd	800 m	2:09.24
2014	South American U23 Championships	Montevideo, Uruguay	4th	1500 m	4:33.13
2014	South American U23 Championships	Montevideo, Uruguay	–	4 × 400 m relay	DQ
2015	South American Championships	Lima, Peru	5th	800 m	2:09.72
2017	South American Championships	Asunción, Paraguay	10th	800 m	2:15.93
2018	South American Games	Cochabamba, Bolivia	6th	800 m	2:17.89
2018	Ibero-American Championships	Trujillo, Peru	4th	800 m	2:08.63
2018	Ibero-American Championships	Trujillo, Peru	3rd	1500 m	4:20.74
2019	South American Championships	Lima, Peru	7th	800 m	2:09.35
2019	South American Championships	Lima, Peru	2nd	1500 m	4:27.83
2019	Pan American Games	Lima, Peru	10th	1500 m	4:22.50
2020	South American Indoor Championships	Cochabamba, Bolivia	2nd	800 m	2:16.99
2020	South American Indoor Championships	Cochabamba, Bolivia	3rd	1500 m	4:38.29
2021	South American Championships	Guayaquil, Ecuador	3rd	1500 m	4:15.61
2022	Ibero-American Championships	La Nucía, Spain	–	1500 m	DNF
2022	South American Games	Asunción, Paraguay	2nd	1500 m	4:16.49
2023	South American Championships	São Paulo, Brazil	–	1500 m	DNF
2023	Pan American Games	Santiago, Chile	10th	1500 m	4:28.37

== Personal bests ==
Outdoor

- 800 metres – 2:06.96 (São Paulo 2014)
- 1000 metres – 2:52.95 (Mar del Plata 2015)
- 1500 metres – 4:20.74 (Trujillo 2018)
- 3000 metres – 9:47.37 (Mar del Plata 2017)
- 10 kilometres – 35:08 (San Bernardo 2017)
- 15 kilometres – 57:30 (Buenos Aires 2017)
- Half marathon – 1:22:20 (Mar del Plata 2015)
