= 2012 Ibero-American Championships in Athletics =

XV Ibero-American Championships
- Dates: 8–10 June
- Host city: Barquisimeto, Venezuela
- Venue: Polideportivo Máximo Viloria
- Events: 44
- Participation: 362 athletes from 24 nations
- Records set: 4 Championship records

The 2012 Ibero-American Championships in Athletics (Spanish: XV Campeonato Iberoamericano de Atletismo) was the fifteenth edition of the international athletics competition between Ibero-American nations. It was held at the Polideportivo Máximo Viloria in Barquisimeto, Venezuela between 8–10 June. Twenty-five nations and a total of 398 athletes participated at the competition.

Initially set to be held in the country's capital Caracas, the competition was moved to Maracay in April 2011. The Venezuelan Sports Ministry had not committed any funds for the event. As a result, the president of the Venezuelan Athletics Federation, Wilfredy León, rescheduled the event following the promise of the Aragua state governor Rafael Isea to help build a new stadium for the championships. However, the new stadium and purpose-built accommodation for the event were not ready within schedule. The event was postponed from May to June, but the project remained off-target and in May 2012 Héctor Rodríguez, the Venezuelan Sports Minister, declared that the competition would be held in Barquisimeto (the host of the 2003 South American Championships).

The highlight performances were two South American records by Brazilians in the women's section. Andressa de Morais threw a record in the discus throw and Lucimara da Silva's heptathlon score was also a Championship record. Barquisimeto native Rosa Rodríguez also set a championship record in the women's hammer throw, while Colombia's James Rendón was the only man to break a competition record, bettering the 20,000 metres walk time.

Argentine thrower Germán Lauro won both the men's shot put and discus events. Ecuador's Álex Quiñónez was the only other athlete to take two individual titles (100 m and 200 m), although Evelyn dos Santos came close by winning the 200 m and finishing second in the 100 m. Becoming one of the oldest gold medallists at the competition, 39-year-old Romary Rifka, who first participated in 1988, won the women's high jump. Brazil, which sent the largest delegation, topped the medal table with fourteen gold medals and a total of 44 overall. Cuba (leaders in 2010) came second with eight golds and eighteen medals. Colombia was third, on six golds, and the hosts Venezuela performed well on home turf, taking fourth place in the table and ten medals from the competition. In addition to the two area records, eleven national records were broken during the competition.

== Medal summary ==
=== Men ===
Event	Gold		Silver		Bronze	
100 metres	Álex Quiñónez (ECU)	10.33	Sandro Viana (BRA)	10.42	Carlos Rodríguez (PUR)	10.60
200 metres	Álex Quiñónez (ECU)	20.34 NR	Aldemir Gomes da Silva (BRA)	20.57	Sandro Viana (BRA)	20.69
400 metres	Anderson Henriques (BRA)	45.59	William Collazo (CUB)	45.80	Arturo Ramírez (VEN)	45.84
800 metres	Andy González (CUB)	1:46.93	Fabiano Peçanha (BRA)	1:47.15	Tayron Reyes (DOM)	1:48.03 NR
1500 metres	Leandro de Oliveira (BRA)	3:47.76	Alberto Imedio (ESP)	3:48.46	Carlos Díaz (CHI)	3:48.50
3000 metres	Víctor Aravena (CHI)	8:04.46	Leslie Encima (CHI)	8:04.99	Flávio Seholhe (MOZ)	8:05.64 NR
5000 metres	Marvin Blanco (VEN)	14:19.89	Javier Carriqueo (ARG)	14:22.12	Veiga Escobedo (MEX)	14:23.36
110 metres hurdles	Ignacio Morales (CUB)	13.54	Hector Cotto (PUR)	13.69	Francisco López (ESP)	13.77
400 metres hurdles	Eric Alejandro (PUR)	49.36	Amauri Valle (CUB)	49.69	Hederson Estefani (BRA)	49.71
3000 metres steeplechase	José Peña (VEN)	8:37.67	Marvin Blanco (VEN)	8:45.34	Gladson Barbosa (BRA)	8:50.84
4 × 100 metres relay	Brazil (BRA); Carlos Moares; Sandro Viana; Nilson André; Aldemir da Silva	38.95	Venezuela (VEN); Jermaine Chirinos; Arturo Ramírez; Diego Rivas; José Eduardo Acevedo	39.01 NR	Ecuador (ECU); Jhon Valencia; Franklin Nazareno; Jhon Tamayo; Álex Quiñónez	40.83
4 × 400 metres relay	Cuba (CUB); Noel Ruiz; Raidel Acea; Orestes Rodríguez; Williams Collazo	3:00.43	Venezuela (VEN); Arturo Ramírez; Albert Bravo; José Meléndez; Omar Longart	3:01.70	Dominican Republic (DOM); Gustavo Cuesta; Yon Soriano; Winder Cuevas; Luguelín Santos	3:03.02
20,000 metres walk	James Rendón (COL)	1:26:12.03 CR	Moacir Zimmermann (BRA)	1:29:15.59	Rubén Abreu (CUB)	1:30:09.14
High jump	Wanner Miller (COL)	2.28 m	Guilherme Cobbo (BRA)	2.25 m	Diego Ferrín (ECU)	2.25 m
Pole vault	Germán Chiaraviglio (ARG)	5.40 m	Augusto Dutra (BRA)	5.30 m	Yanquier Lara (CUB)	5.20 m
Long jump	Georni Jaramillo (VEN)	8.02 m	Jean Marie Okutu (ESP)	7.87 m	Rogério Bispo (BRA)	7.67 m
Triple jump	Yoandri Betanzos (CUB)	16.75 m	Jefferson Sabino (BRA)	16.70 m	Jonathan Henrique Silva (BRA)	16.48 m
Shot put	Germán Lauro (ARG)	20.13 m	Carlos Velis (CUB)	19.97 m	Darlan Romani (BRA)	18.93 m
Discus throw	Germán Lauro (ARG)	63.55 m	Ronald Julião (BRA)	61.67 m	Pedro Cuesta (ESP)	59.77 m
Hammer throw	Roberto Janet (CUB)	72.74 m	Wagner Domingos (BRA)	71.91 m	Juan Cerra (ARG)	70.86 m
Javelin throw	Braian Toledo (ARG)	77.33 m	Arley Ibargüen (COL)	76.48 m	Dayron Márquez (COL)	76.48 m
Decathlon	Luiz Alberto Araújo (BRA)	7772 pts	Anderson Venâncio (BRA)	7482 pts	Tiago Marco (POR)	7338 pts

=== Women ===
Event	Gold		Silver		Bronze	
100 metres	Rosângela Santos (BRA)	11.41	Evelyn dos Santos (BRA)	11.44	María Alejandra Idrobo (COL)	11.53
200 metres	Evelyn dos Santos (BRA)	22.99	María Alejandra Idrobo (COL)	23.20	Mariely Sánchez (DOM)	23.26
400 metres	Daisurami Bonne (CUB)	52.27	Geisa Coutinho (BRA)	52.66	Joelma Sousa (BRA)	52.72
800 metres	Rosibel García (COL)	2:03.00	Rose Mary Almanza (CUB)	2:03.29	Adriana Muñoz (CUB)	2:03.71
1500 metres	Adriana Muñoz (CUB)	4:20.36	Andrea Ferris (PAN)	4:20.50	Sandra López (MEX)	4:21.00
3000 metres	Tatiele Carvalho (BRA)	9:20.07	Nadia Rodriguez (ARG)	9:23.17	Catarina Ribeiro (POR)	9:26.98
5000 metres	Sandra Lopez (MEX)	16:10.77	Fabiana Cristine da Silva (BRA)	16:12.20	Nadia Rodriguez (ARG)	16:18.51
100 metres hurdles	Eliecith Palacios (COL)	13.15	Belkis Milanés (CUB)	13.21	LaVonne Idlette (DOM)	13.24
400 metres hurdles	Lucimar Teodoro (BRA)	56.99	Sharolyn Scott (CRC)	57.11	Yolanda Osana (DOM)	57.15
3000 metres steeplechase	Yony Ninahuaman (PER)	10:24.95	María Mancebo (DOM)	10:28.86	Eliane Luanda Pereira (BRA)	10:44.36
4 × 100 metres relay	Brazil (BRA); Geisa Coutinho; Lucimar de Moura; Evelyn dos Santos; Rosângela Santos	43.90	Dominican Republic (DOM); Mariely Sánchez; Fany Chalas; Marleny Mejía; Margarita Manzueta	44.04 NR	Colombia (COL); Eliecit Palacios; María Alejandra Idrobo; Nelcy Caicedo; Darlenys Obregón	44.42
4 × 400 metres relay	Brazil (BRA); Joelma das Neves; Jailma de Lima; Geisa Coutinho; Lucimar Teodoro	3:28.56	Cuba (CUB); Aimée Martínez; Daysurami Bonne; Rosemarie Almanza; Adriana Muñoz	3:29.13	Dominican Republic (DOM); Santa Félix; Yolanda Osana; Marleny Mejía; Raysa Sánchez	3:38.48
10,000 metres walk	Arabelly Orjuela (COL)	46:21.69	Ingrid Hernández (COL)	48:48.81	Milangela Rosales (VEN)	48:10.81
High jump	Romary Rifka (MEX)	1.89 m	Aline Santos (BRA)	1.84 m	Monica Araújo de Freitas (BRA)	1.81 m
Pole vault	Dailis Caballero (CUB)	4,50 m	Karla da Rosa (BRA)	4,10 m	Sara Pereira (BRA)	4,10 m
Long jump	Eliane Martins (BRA)	6.55 m	Macarena Reyes (CHI)	6.14 m	Giselle de Albuquerque (BRA)	6.14 m
Triple jump	Susana Costa (POR)	13.64 m	Gisele Lima (BRA)	13.46 m	Gisele Landazury (COL)	13.28 m
Shot put	Geisa Arcanjo (BRA)	18.84 m	Natalia Ducó (CHI)	18.46 m	Misleydis González (CUB)	18.03 m
Discus throw	Andressa de Morais (BRA)	64.21 m AR	Fernanda Martins (BRA)	57.87 m	Karen Gallardo (CHI)	57.40 m
Hammer throw	Rosa Rodríguez (VEN)	71.76 m CR	Jennifer Dahlgren (ARG)	71.23 m	Johana Moreno (COL)	68.58 m
Javelin throw	Flor Ruiz (COL)	58.21 m	Leryn Franco (PAR)	57.77 m NR	Laila Ferrer e Silva (BRA)	57.14 m
Heptathlon	Lucimara da Silva (BRA)	6160 pts AR, CR	Thaymara Rivas (VEN)	5622 pts =NR	Tamara de Sousa (BRA)	5548 pts

== Medal table ==
* Host nation (Venezuela)

Rank	Nation	Gold	Silver	Bronze	Total
1	Brazil	14	17	13	44
2	Cuba	8	6	4	18
3	Colombia	6	3	5	14
4	Venezuela*	4	4	2	10
5	Argentina	4	3	2	9
6	Ecuador	2	0	2	4
6	Mexico	2	0	2	4
8	Chile	1	3	2	6
9	Puerto Rico	1	1	1	3
10	Portugal	1	0	2	3
11	Peru	1	0	0	1
12	Dominican Republic	0	2	6	8
13	Spain	0	2	2	4
14	Costa Rica	0	1	0	1
14	Panama	0	1	0	1
14	Paraguay	0	1	0	1
17	Mozambique	0	0	1	1
Totals (17 entries)		44	44	44	132

== Participating nations ==
Twenty-four members of the Asociación Iberoamericana de Atletismo sent athletes to the event. The level of athlete participation (362 in total) was relatively high compared to previous years although non-American countries representation was rather poor. Aruba participated for the first time. The five member nations not competing were Andorra, Cape Verde, Equatorial Guinea, Guatemala, Guinea-Bissau and São Tomé and Príncipe.

- Angola (2)
- Argentina (24)
- Aruba (1)
- Bolivia (3)
- Brazil (70)
- Chile (10)
- Colombia (32)
- Costa Rica (3)
- Cuba (24)
- Dominican Republic (19)
- Ecuador (18)
- Honduras (8)
- Mexico (21)
- Mozambique (2)
- Nicaragua (3)
- Panama (7)
- Paraguay (9)
- Peru (5)
- Portugal (4)
- Puerto Rico (12)
- El Salvador (2)
- Spain (16)
- Uruguay (4)
- Venezuela (63)
