= Joaquín Arbe =

Argentine long-distance runner

Personal information
- Born: 25 August 1990 (age 35) Esquel, Chubut, Argentina

Sport
- Country: Argentina
- Sport: Athletics
- Event: Long-distance running

Joaquín Arbe (born 25 August 1990) is an Argentine long-distance runner. In 2020, he competed in the men's race at the 2020 World Athletics Half Marathon Championships held in Gdynia, Poland.

He represented Argentina at the 2020 Summer Olympics in Tokyo, Japan in the men's marathon.
