= Talles Silva =

Brazilian high jumper

Talles Frederico Silva
Personal information
- Full name: Talles Frederico Souza; Silva
- Born: 20 August 1991 (age 34) São Gonçalo do Rio Abaixo, Brazil
- Height: 1.84 m (6 ft 0 in)
- Weight: 73 kg (161 lb)

Sport
- Country: Brazil
- Sport: Athletics
- Event: High jump

Achievements and titles
- Personal best: High jump: 2.30 (2017)
- Updated on 29 August 2015

Talles Frederico Souza Silva (born August 20, 1991) is a Brazilian high jumper. A member of Brazil's track and field squad at the 2015 IAAF World Championships, the 2015 Pan American Games, and the 2016 Summer Olympics, he cleared an automatic qualifying height of 2.29 m as his personal best at the regional grand prix meet in Campinas less than five months before his nation hosted the Games.

At the 2016 Summer Olympics in Rio de Janeiro, Silva competed as a lone countryman for the host nation Brazil in the men's high jump. Leading up to his maiden Games, Silva jumped a height of 2.29 metres to attain both his personal best and the IAAF Olympic entry standard in Campinas. During the qualifying phase, Silva elected to pass 2.17 at his first attempt, but he could not trump the 2.20-metre barrier with all three misses, ending his campaign quickly in a six-way tie with the other five high jumpers for thirty-fifth place.

== Competition record ==
Year	Competition	Venue	Position	Notes
Representing Brazil
2008	South American Youth Championships	Lima, Peru	2nd	2.05 m
2009	South American Junior Championships	São Paulo, Brazil	4th	2.03 m
2009	Pan American Junior Championships	Port of Spain, Trinidad and Tobago	6th	2.05 m
2010	South American Games / 2010 South American U23 Championships	Medellín, Colombia	7th	1.95 m
2010	World Junior Championships	Moncton, Canada	16th (q)	2.14 m
2011	South American Championships	Buenos Aires, Argentina	5th	2.17 m
2012	Ibero-American Championships	Barquisimeto, Venezuela	8th	2.16 m
2012	South American U23 Championships	São Paulo, Brazil	1st	2.21 m
2013	South American Championships	Cartagena, Colombia	1st	2.22 m
2014	Ibero-American Championships	São Paulo, Brazil	5th	2.18 m
2014	Pan American Sports Festival	Mexico City, Mexico	6th	2.15 m
2015	South American Championships	Lima, Peru	2nd	2.22 m
2015	Pan American Games	Toronto, Canada	9th	2.20 m
2015	World Championships	Beijing, China	39th (q)	2.17 m
2016	Ibero-American Championships	Rio de Janeiro, Brazil	5th	2.20 m
2016	Olympic Games	Rio de Janeiro, Brazil	35th (q)	2.17 m
2017	South American Championships	Asunción, Paraguay	2nd	2.28 m
2017	World Championships	London, United Kingdom	15th (q)	2.29 m
2018	South American Games	Cochabamba, Bolivia	4th	2.22 m
2018	Ibero-American Championships	Trujillo, Peru	2nd	2.21 m
2023	South American Championships	São Paulo, Brazil	3rd	2.13 m

== @talesfsilva ==
- Talles Silva at World Athletics
