= 2008 South American Youth Championships in Athletics =

XIX South American Youth Championships in Athletics
- Dates: November 29–30
- Host city: Lima, Peru
- Venue: Villa Deportiva Nacional (VIDENA)
- Level: Youth
- Events: 40
- Participation: about 256 athletes from 12 nations

The 19th South American Youth Championships in Athletics were held in Lima, Peru from November 29–30, 2008. A detailed report on the results was given.

== Medal summary ==
Medal winners are published. Complete results can be found on the "World Junior Athletics History" website.

=== Men ===
Event	Gold		Silver		Bronze	
100 metres (−3.9 m/s)	Diego Cavalcanti (BRA)	10.96	Yesid Lazo (COL)	11.03	Gustavo dos Santos (BRA)	11.25
200 metres (−0.4 m/s)	Diego Cavalcanti (BRA)	21.86	Yesid Lazo (COL)	21.97	Leandro de Araújo (BRA)	22.47
400 metres	Omar Longart (VEN)	47.95	Diego da Silva (BRA)	49.36	Javier Villalba (ARG)	49.51
800 metres	Cassio da Mota (BRA)	1:55.54	Walter Paez (ARG)	1:55.87	Jesús Petit (VEN)	1:56.53
1500 metres	Evandro Maciel (BRA)	3:59.76	Marcelo Micchia (ARG)	4:01.81	Renan Bispo (BRA)	4:02.15
3000 metres	António Barbosa Filho (BRA)	8:43.18	Êmerson de Morães (BRA)	8:47.20	René Champi (PER)	8:52.35
2000 metres steeplechase	Renzo José Lizarraga (PER)	6:06.64	Roberto Tello (CHI)	6:10.03	Vagner Nascimento (BRA)	6:14.08
110 metres hurdles (−2.3 m/s)	Jonathan Henrique Silva (BRA)	14.12	Rennan da Silva (BRA)	14.22	Javier McFarlane (PER)	14.28
400 metres hurdles	Hederson Estefani (BRA)	51.67 CR AR-y	Artur Terezan (BRA)	53.94	Ivan Lu (PAN)	54.57
High jump	Carlos Layoy (ARG)	2.08 CR	Talles Silva (BRA)	2.05	Santiago Pérez De Castro (CHI)	2.02
Pole vault	Martín Correa (CHI)	4.40	Francisco Escobar (COL)	4.30	José Tomás Lavin (CHI)	4.30
Long jump	Jhamal Bowen (PAN)	7.82 CR (1.2 m/s)	Lourival Neto (BRA)	7.31 (1.4 m/s)	Gustavo dos Santos (BRA)	7.28 (1.1 m/s)
Triple jump	Rodrigo Silva (BRA)	15.17 (0.5 m/s)	Jonathan Henrique Silva (BRA)	15.11w (2.4 m/s)	Luis Monagas (VEN)	14.42 (1.0 m/s)
Shot put	Henrique Brandão (BRA)	17.25	Darlan Romani (BRA)	17.06	Yojer Egypt Medina (VEN)	16.64
Discus throw	Raílson da Cruz (BRA)	50.38	Rafael Vagula (BRA)	49.31	Diego Ortega (ARG)	48.13
Hammer throw	Jaime Díaz (CHI)	60.84	Daian Meza (ARG)	58.87	Marcelo Borges (BRA)	58.71
Javelin throw	Hugo Fernandes (BRA)	63.52	José Lemos (COL)	61.20	Braian Toledo (ARG)	60.41
Octathlon	Javier McFarlane (PER)	5772	Victor Santos (BRA)	5728	Marcos Rocha (BRA)	5685
10000 metres Walk	Caio Bonfim (BRA)	43:21.9 CR	José Leonardo Montaña (COL)	43:24.1	Niel García (PER)	48:59.8
1000 metres Medley relay	Brazil; Gustavo dos Santos; Diego Cavalcanti; Diego da Silva; Hederson Estefani	1:54.10	Venezuela; Yordan Campos; Anderson Delgado; Jesús Petit; Omar Longart	1:56.08	Chile; Martín Correa; Eduardo Correa; Felipe Balcazar; Vicente Vicuña	1:59.31

=== Women ===
Event	Gold		Silver		Bronze	
100 metres	Bárbara Leôncio (BRA)	11.93	Bárbara de Oliveira (BRA)	12.39	Victoria Woodward (ARG)	12.44
200 metres (−0.1 m/s)	Bárbara Leôncio (BRA)	24.03	Bárbara de Oliveira (BRA)	24.61	Anneliese Grosser (CHI)	25.25
400 metres	Natalia da Silva (BRA)	56.22	Lorena Lourenço (BRA)	56.50	Evelis Aguilar (COL)	57.67
800 metres	Roselbis Stormes (VEN)	2:13.05	Natália Oliveira (BRA)	2:17.39	Janella Jonas (GUY)	2:18.03
1500 metres	Evangelina Thomas (ARG)	4:35.58	Juana Paniagua (PAR)	4:44.79	Tatiana Araújo (BRA)	4:46.95
3000 metres	Jenifer Silva (BRA)	10:15.5	Charo Inga (PER)	10:17.9	Eliana Delgado (PER)	10:24.2
2000 metres steeplechase	Florencia Borelli (ARG)	7:08.63	Elizabeth Flores (PER)	7:18.95	Cinthia Bendezu (PER)	7:20.94
100 metres hurdles	Denise dos Santos (BRA)	14.58	Cecilia Rivera (CHI)	14.71	Marielba Rengifo (VEN)	15.07
400 metres hurdles	Déborah Rodríguez (URU)	61.27	Maria Laura Tre (ARG)	62.18	Cleidimar Espinoza (VEN)	62.71
High jump	Betsabé Páez (ARG); Monique Varmeling (BRA)	1.72			Kashani Ríos (PAN)	1.63
Pole vault	Claudia Vitoria (BRA)	3.70	Maira Silva (BRA)	3.60	Victoria Fernández (CHI)	3.40
Long jump	Paula Neves (BRA)	5.85 (0.1 m/s)	Nelsibeth Villalobos (VEN)	5.66 w (2.3 m/s)	Bianca dos Santos (BRA)	5.59 (−1.6 m/s)
Triple jump	Bianca dos Santos (BRA)	12.63 (0.0 m/s)	Maria Dittborn (CHI)	12.15 (1.3 m/s)	Yudelsy González (VEN)	12.01 w (2.4 m/s)
Shot put	Geisa Arcanjo (BRA)	14.22	Mariana Marcelino (BRA)	13.45	Alessandra Gamboa (PER)	12.94
Discus throw	Lidiane Cansian (BRA)	43.91 CR	Geisa Arcanjo (BRA)	43.23	Maria Fátima Ramos (PER)	40.67
Hammer throw	Julia Nuñez (ARG)	47.97	Mariana Marcelino (BRA)	47.80	Kelly Narváez (VEN)	45.48
Javelin throw	Bárbara López (ARG)	44.33	Rafaela Gonçalves (BRA)	44.20	Liliana Fuentes (CHI)	41.10
Heptathlon	Cynthia Alves (BRA)	4885 CR	María Jesús Devia (VEN)	4761	Mariza Karabia (PAR)	4382
5000 metres Walk	Kimberly García (PER)	24:59.5	Wendy Cornejo (BOL)	25:07.6	Maricela Salamanca (CHI)	25:24.2
1000 metres Medley relay	Brazil; Bárbara de Oliveira; Bárbara Leôncio; Lorena Lourenço; Natalia da Silva	2:12.47	Chile; Maria Dittborn; Isidora Jiménez; Anneliese Grosser; Constanza Bernales	2:16.41	Venezuela; Marielba Rengifo; Nancy Garces; Cleidimar Espinoza; Roselbis Stormes	2:19.88

== Medal table (unofficial) ==
* Host nation (Peru)

Rank	Nation	Gold	Silver	Bronze	Total
1	Brazil (BRA)	26	19	9	54
2	Argentina (ARG)	6	4	4	14
3	Peru (PER)*	3	2	7	12
4	Chile (CHI)	2	4	7	13
5	Venezuela (VEN)	2	3	8	13
6	Panama (PAN)	1	0	2	3
7	Uruguay (URU)	1	0	0	1
8	Colombia (COL)	0	5	1	6
9	Paraguay (PAR)	0	1	1	2
10	Bolivia (BOL)	0	1	0	1
11	Guyana (GUY)	0	0	1	1
Totals (11 entries)		41	39	40	120

== Participation (unofficial) ==
Detailed result lists can be found on the "World Junior Athletics History" website. An unofficial count yields the number of about 256 athletes from about 12 countries:

- Argentina (32)
- Bolivia (11)
- Brazil (64)
- Chile (45)
- Colombia (13)
- Ecuador (1)
- Guyana (2)
- Panama (7)
- Paraguay (7)
- Peru (46)
- Uruguay (5)
- Venezuela (23)
