= Geisa Arcanjo =

Brazilian athlete (born 1991)

Personal information
- Full name: Geisa Rafaela Arcanjo
- Born: 19 September 1991 (age 34) São Roque, São Paulo, Brazil
- Height: 1.80 m (5 ft 11 in)
- Weight: 92 kg (203 lb)

Sport
- Country: Brazil
- Sport: Athletics
- Event: Shot put
- Updated on 5 February 2015

Geisa Rafaela Arcanjo (born 19 September 1991) is a Brazilian athlete. She was a finalist at the 2012 Summer Olympics, finishing sixth. Her personal best for the event is 19.02 metres. She was the 2012 gold medallist at the Ibero-American Championships in Athletics. Arcanjo initially won at the 2010 World Junior Championships in Athletics but was disqualified for doping.

== Career ==
Born in São Roque, São Paulo, she started in athletics by competing in the shot put and the discus throw. She made her debut for Brazil at the 2007 World Youth Championships in Athletics, competing in the discus. Her first international medal came in 2008 when she was the gold medallist in the shot put at the 2008 South American Youth Championships in Athletics. She also won the Brazilian youth titles in both the discus and shot. The following year she stepped up to the junior (under 19) level. She had similar success, winning the shot put gold and discus silver at the South American Junior Championships as well as a shot put bronze medal at the Pan American Junior Championships.

She began to focus on shot put in 2010 and threw a Brazilian junior record of 17.11 m. She came fifth at the South American Games and fourth at the Ibero-American Championships. At the 2010 World Junior Championships in Athletics, she won Brazil's first gold medal at the championships since 1994. However, her doping test came back positive for the banned diuretic Hydrochlorothiazide and she was later disqualified. Arcanjo said that the substance had entered her system through a green tea that she had been taking, unbeknownst to her coach. An initial judgment by the national athletics body (Confederação Brasileira de Atletismo) accepted the athlete's statement and gave her a warning rather than a ban. Brazil's sports court, Superior Tribunal de Justiça Desportiva, overturned this decision on these grounds but upheld the warning due to the lack of enhancing impact that the substance would have on the athlete's performance. Arcanjo missed much of the 2011 season due to the length of the proceedings.

Arcanjo had significantly improved when she returned to action in 2012, setting a series of personal bests on the Brazilian circuit. She cleared eighteen metres for the first time at the 2012 Ibero-American Championships in Athletics, where she won the shot put with a personal best of 18.84 metres. After winning her first Brazilian title, she was selected for the Brazilian team for the 2012 London Olympics. Her throw of 19.02 metres in the Olympic final was enough for seventh place. She ended her season with a win at the 2012 South American Under-23 Championships in Athletics.

She finished 9th in the Shot Put at the 2015 Pan American Games.

At the 2015 World Championships in Athletics, she finished 15th in the Women's shot put.

She competed at the 2020 Summer Olympics.

After the 2012 Olympic Games, her performance dropped a lot, never matching her Olympic mark of 19m02, and retiring in 2022, after ten years with little relevant results even in competitions like the Pan American Games, where she would theoretically be a favorite.

== Personal bests ==
Event	Result	Venue	Date
Shot put	19.02 m	London, United Kingdom	6 August 2012
Discus throw	53.30 m	São Paulo, Brazil	1 May 2010

== International competitions ==
Year	Competition	Venue	Position	Event	Notes
Representing Brazil
2007	World Youth Championships	Ostrava, Czech Republic	26th (q)	Discus	38.09 m
2008	South American Youth Championships	Lima, Peru	1st	Shot put (4 kg)	14.22 m
2008	South American Youth Championships	Lima, Peru	2nd	Discus throw (1 kg)	43.23 m
2009	South American Junior Championships	São Paulo, Brazil	1st	Shot put	15.30 m
2009	South American Junior Championships	São Paulo, Brazil	2nd	Discus	48.18 m
2009	Pan American Junior Championships	Port of Spain, Trinidad and Tobago	3rd	Shot put	15.69 m
2009	Pan American Junior Championships	Port of Spain, Trinidad and Tobago	4th	Discus	46.01 m
2010	South American Games	Medellín, Colombia	1st	Shot put	14.16 m
2010	South American U23 Championships	Medellín, Colombia	1st	Shot put	14.16 m
2010	Ibero-American Championships	San Fernando, Spain	4th	Shot put	16.10 m
2010	World Junior Championships	Moncton, Canada	—	Shot put	DQ (Doping)
2012	Ibero-American Championships	Barquisimeto, Venezuela	1st	Shot put	18.84 m
2012	Olympic Games	London, United Kingdom	7th	Shot put	19.02 m
2012	South American U23 Championships	São Paulo, Brazil	1st	Shot put	18.43 m
2013	South American Championships	Cartagena, Colombia	1st	Shot put	18.27 m
2013	World Championships	Moscow, Russia	18th (q)	Shot put	17.55 m
2015	South American Championships	Lima, Peru	1st	Shot put	17.76 m
2015	Pan American Games	Toronto, Canada	9th	Shot put	17.18 m
2015	World Championships	Beijing, China	15th (q)	Shot put	17.42 m
2016	Ibero-American Championships	Rio de Janeiro, Brazil	2nd	Shot put	17.92 m
2016	Olympic Games	Rio de Janeiro, Brazil	9th	Shot put	18.16 m
2017	South American Championships	Asunción, Paraguay	1st	Shot put	18.06 m
2017	World Championships	London, United Kingdom	9th	Shot put	18.03 m
2018	South American Games	Cochabamba, Bolivia	3rd	Shot put	17.30 m
2018	Ibero-American Championships	Trujillo, Peru	1st	Shot put	18.10 m
2019	South American Championships	Lima, Peru	2nd	Shot put	17.16 m
2019	World Championships	Doha, Qatar	21st (q)	Shot put	17.45 m
2020	South American Indoor Championships	Cochabamba, Bolivia	1st	Shot put	17.09 m
2021	Olympic Games	Tokyo, Japan	30th (q)	Shot put	16,46 m
