= Athletics at the 2010 South American Games – Men's 200 metres =

The Men's 200m event at the 2010 South American Games was held on March 21, with the heats at 10:50 and the Final at 18:50.

== Medalists ==
Gold	Silver	Bronze
Arturo Ramírez; Venezuela	Luis Carlos Núñez; Colombia	Rubens Quirino; Brazil

== Records ==
Standing records prior to the 2010 South American Games
World record	Usain Bolt	Jamaica	19.19	Berlin, Germany	20 August 2009
World Leading	Matt Davies	Australia	20.54	Perth, Australia	19 February 2010
South American record	Alonso Edward	Panama	19.81	Berlin, Germany	20 August 2009
South American U23 record	Alonso Edward	Panama	19.81	Berlin, Germany	20 August 2009

== Results ==
Results were published.

=== Heats ===
==== Heat 1 ====
Rank	Athlete	Nationality	Reaction	Result	Notes
1	Arturo Ramírez	Venezuela	0.200	21.04	w, Q
2	Luis Carlos Núñez	Colombia	0.255	21.14	w, Q
3	Michel Mary	Uruguay	0.198	21.23	w, Q
4	Rubens Quirino	Brazil	0.168	21.27	w, q
5	Chavez Ageday	Guyana	0.253	22.25	w, q
6	Felipe Balcazar	Chile	0.187	22.31	w
	Juan Manuel Jassid	Argentina		DNS	
			Wind: +2.4 m/s		

==== Heat 2 ====
Rank	Athlete	Nationality	Reaction	Result	Notes
1	Diego Rivas	Venezuela	0.234	21.57	w, Q
2	Gustavo dos Santos	Brazil	0.176	21.89	w, Q
3	Fernando Tomás Gómez	Chile	0.219	22.05	w, Q
4	Stiven Valois	Colombia	0.152	22.49	
	Ifrish Alberg	Suriname		DNS	
	Hensley Paulina	Netherlands Antilles		DNS	^{†}
			Wind: +3.0 m/s		

^{†}: Not eligible for the South American Under-23 Championships.

=== Final ===
Rank	Athlete	Nationality	Reaction	Result	Notes
1st place, gold medalist(s)	Arturo Ramírez	Venezuela	0.225	20.99	
2nd place, silver medalist(s)	Luis Carlos Núñez	Colombia	0.194	21.05	PB
3rd place, bronze medalist(s)	Rubens Quirino	Brazil	0.180	21.29	SB
4	Michel Mary	Uruguay	0.192	21.29	
5	Diego Rivas	Venezuela	0.214	21.31	
6	Fernando Tomás Gómez	Chile	0.233	21.88	
7	Chavez Ageday	Guyana	0.232	22.07	
8	Gustavo dos Santos	Brazil	0.226	22.16	
			Wind: +1.3 m/s		

== See also ==
- 2010 South American Under-23 Championships in Athletics
