= Arturo Chávez (athlete) =

Peruvian high jumper (born 1990)

Personal information
- Born: 12 January 1990 (age 36)
- Height: 1.90 m (6 ft 3 in)
- Weight: 76 kg (168 lb)

Sport
- Sport: Athletics
- Event: High jump

Arturo Chávez Korfiatis (born 12 January 1990) is a Peruvian athlete specialising in the high jump. He represented his country at the 2016 Summer Olympics without qualifying for the final.

His personal best in the event is 2.31 metres set in Mexico City in 2016.

== International competitions ==
| Year | Competition | Venue | Position | Notes |
Representing Peru
| 2009 | South American Championships | Lima, Peru | 5th | 1.95 m |
| 2009 | South American Junior Championships | São Paulo, Brazil | 2nd | 2.09 m |
| 2009 | Bolivarian Games | Sucre, Bolivia | 3rd | 2.05 m |
| 2010 | South American Games / South American U23 Championships | Medellín, Colombia | 5th | 2.09 m |
| 2011 | Pan American Games | Guadalajara, Mexico | 12th | 2.10 m |
| 2012 | South American U23 Championships | São Paulo, Brazil | 5th | 2.16 m |
| 2013 | South American Championships | Cartagena, Colombia | 7th | 2.10 m |
| 2013 | Bolivarian Games | Trujillo, Peru | 1st | 2.17 m |
| 2014 | World Indoor Championships | Sopot, Poland | – | NM |
| 2014 | South American Games | Santiago, Chile | 2nd | 2.18 m |
| 2015 | South American Championships | Lima, Peru | 5th | 2.10 m |
| 2016 | Ibero-American Championships | Rio de Janeiro, Brazil | 4th | 2.23 m |
| 2016 | Olympic Games | Rio de Janeiro, Brazil | 29th (q) | 2.22 m |
| 2017 | Bolivarian Games | Santa Marta, Colombia | 2nd | 2.18 m |
| 2018 | South American Games | Cochabamba, Bolivia | 7th | 2.10 m |
| 2019 | South American Championships | Lima, Peru | 6th | 2.10 m |
| 2019 | Pan American Games | Lima, Peru | 9th | 2.15 m |
| 2021 | South American Championships | Guayaquil, Ecuador | 5th | 2.17 m |
| 2022 | Ibero-American Championships | La Nucía, Spain | 10th | 2.05 m |
| 2022 | Bolivarian Games | Valledupar, Colombia | 4th | 2.05 m |
