= Athletics at the 2010 South American Games – Women's 800 metres =

The Women's 800m event at the 2010 South American Games was held on March 21 at 18:05.

== Medalists ==
Gold	Silver	Bronze
Jessica dos Santos; Brazil	Geisiane de Lima; Brazil	Evangelina Thomas; Argentina

== Records ==
Standing records prior to the 2010 South American Games
World record	Jarmila Kratochvílová	Czechoslovakia	1:53.28	Munich, Germany	26 July 1983
World Leading	Holly Noack	Australia	2:04.26	Hobart, Australia	12 February 2010
South American record	Letitia Vriesde	Suriname	1:56.68	Gothenburg, Sweden	13 August 1995
South American U23 record	Luciana de Paula Mendes	Brazil	2:00.37	La Chaux-de-Fonds, Switzerland	8 August 1993

== Results ==
Results were published.

Rank	Athlete	Nationality	Result	Notes
1st place, gold medalist(s)	Jessica dos Santos	Brazil	2:09.72	
2nd place, silver medalist(s)	Geisiane de Lima	Brazil	2:10.98	
3rd place, bronze medalist(s)	Evangelina Thomas	Argentina	2:11.58	SB
4	Rosa Escobar	Colombia	2:14.91	
5	Vanessa Philbert	Netherlands Antilles	2:15.66	^{†}
–	Alison Sánchez	Bolivia	DSQ	^{‡}

^{†}: Not eligible for the South American Under-23 Championships.
^{‡}: Alison Sánchez from Bolivia was initially 6th in 2:17.27, but was disqualified, because she was tested positive for nandrolone.

Intermediate times:

400m	1:03.59	Jessica dos Santos (BRA)
600m	1:37.25	Jessica dos Santos (BRA)

== See also ==
- 2010 South American Under-23 Championships in Athletics
