= Athletics at the 2010 South American Games – Women's shot put =

The Women's Shot Put event at the 2010 South American Games was held on March 21 at 17:40.

== Medalists ==
Gold	Silver	Bronze
Natalia Ducó; Chile	Ángela Rivas; Colombia	Luz Leyni Montaño; Colombia

== Records ==
Standing records prior to the 2010 South American Games
World record	Natalya Lisovskaya	Soviet Union	22.63m	Moscow, USSR	7 June 1987
World Leading	Valerie Vili	New Zealand	20.57m	Sydney, Australia	27 February 2010
South American record	Elisângela Adriano	Brazil	19.30m	Tunja, Colombia	14 July 2001
South American U23 record	Natalia Ducó	Chile	18.65m	Iquique, Chile	13 June 2008

== Results ==
Results were published.

=== Final ===
Rank	Athlete	Nationality	Attempt						Best Result	Notes
Rank	Athlete	Nationality	1	2	3	4	5	6	Best Result	Notes
1st place, gold medalist(s)	Natalia Ducó	Chile	17.34	17.54	17.71	17.38	17.06	x	17.71	
2nd place, silver medalist(s)	Ángela Rivas	Colombia	15.47	14.70	15.24	16.01	16.33	15.41	16.33	
3rd place, bronze medalist(s)	Luz Leyni Montaño	Colombia	12.84	14.40	14.17	x	14.00	14.54	14.54	
4	Renata Severiano	Brazil	12.84	14.28	14.07	14.30	13.81	14.00	14.30	
5	Geisa Arcanjo	Brazil	x	x	14.16	x	x	x	14.16	
6	Alessandra Gamboa	(Peru) Perú	12.67	13.60	13.41	x	13.50	x	13.60	
7	Madelaine Santa Cruz	Ecuador	10.96	11.93	11.79	x	11.55	11.08	11.93	

== See also ==
- 2010 South American Under-23 Championships in Athletics
