= Javier McFarlane =

Peruvian athlete (born 1991)

Personal information
- Born: 21 October 1991 (age 34) Peru, Lima

Sport
- Sport: Track and field
- Event(s): 110 metres hurdles Long jump
Medal record
Representing Peru
Ibero-American Championships
Gold medal – first place	2016 Rio de Janeiro	110 m hurdles
Silver medal – second place	2014 São Paulo	110 m hurdles
Silver medal – second place	2018 Trujillo	110 m hurdles
South American Games
Gold medal – first place	2014 Santiago	110 m hurdles
Silver medal – second place	2010 Medellin	Long jump
Bronze medal – third place	2010 Medellin	110 m hurdles
South American Championships
Bronze medal – third place	2015 Lima	110 m hurdles
Bronze medal – third place	2017 Asunción	110 m hurdles
Bolivarian Games
Gold medal – first place	2017 Santa Marta	110 m hurdles
Silver medal – second place	2013 Trujillo	Long jump
Bronze medal – third place	2013 Trujillo	110 m hurdles

Javier Arturo Mc Farlane Olazábal (born 21 October 1991) is a Peruvian track and field athlete who competes mainly in the 110 metres hurdles and long jump. He holds the Peruvian National Record for 110 metres hurdles with 13.52 seconds.

He was the hurdles Gold medallist at 2016 Ibero-American Championships in Athletics and Silver medallist at 2014 Ibero-American Championships in Athletics and 2018 Ibero-American Championships in Athletics in 110 metres hurdles. Also, gold medallist in 2014 in the South American Games in 110 metres hurdles, and four years earlier (2010) he won silver (long jump) & bronze (110 metres hurdles). Regarding the South American Championships in Athletics in 2015 and 2017, he won bronze medal in 110 metres hurdles in both championships.

His personal bests are 13.52 seconds for the 110 metres hurdles (NR) and 7.78 m (25 ft 6 1/4 in) for the long jump.

He competed internationally from a young age and won several medals at the South American U20 Championships in Athletics, South American Under-23 Championships in Athletics and South American Championships in Athletics. He also has represented his country at the Pan American Games, Summer Universiade and World Athletics Indoor Championships.

He represents his country in the following championships:

- 2009, 2013, 2015, 2017, 2019 and 2021 South American Championships in Athletics
- 2010 World Junior Championships in Athletics
- 2010, 2014 and 2018 South American Games
- 2011 Summer Universiade
- 2011 Pan American Games
- 2013 and 2017 Bolivarian Games
- 2014, 2016 and 2018 Ibero-American Championships in Athletics
- 2015 Pan American Games.
- 2018 IAAF World Indoor Championships
- 2019 Pan American Games

His brother Jorge McFarlane is also a hurdles/long jumper and a South American champion.

== Career ==
=== Early career ===
Born in Lima, Mc Farlane followed his older brother, Jorge, into the sport of athletics. While his brother specialised in hurdling and long jump, Javier Mc Farlane began with combined track and field events and was the winner of the octathlon at the 2008 South American Youth Championships in Athletics, ranking 4th in the world ranking that year, which was held in his native Lima. He also managed a bronze medal in the 110 m hurdles. The sixteen-year-old Peruvian also competed at the higher age category 2008 South American Under-23 Championships in Athletics, also held in Lima that year: he was last in the hurdles (an event his brother won), but helped the Peruvian 4×100 metres relay team to the bronze medals. After 2008 he did not compete in combined events and began to mirror the specialities of his brother.

At the 2009 South American Junior Championships, he struggled to adapt to the higher age group and was fifth in the long jump and failed to finish the hurdles. With the South American Senior Championships being held in Lima, he was allowed to compete for the host nation and was fifth in the long and relay, but last in the hurdles heats. The Mc Farlane brothers performed well at the combined 2010 South American U23 Championships/South American Games: Javier placed third in both the long jump and hurdles while Jorge took the golds. Javier Mc Farlane's long jump bronze was ranked as a silver medal in the South American Games element of the competition, as the runner-up Jhamal Bowen of Panama was not registered to compete.

Mc Farlane made his global debut in both long jump and hurdles at the 2010 World Junior Championships in Athletics, but was not competitive at that level and was eliminated in the first round of both. He met a similar fate at the Universiade the year after, and also placed last in sixteenth at the Pan American Games. His last international performance in age category competitions came at the 2012 South American Under-23 Championships. He focused on the hurdles there and finished fourth.

=== Senior competition ===
Mc Farlane began to establish himself as a senior level athlete in the 2013 season. At the 2013 South American Championships in Athletics he set a personal best of 13.85 seconds to take fourth place in the hurdles, while his brother won in a Peruvian record time. Both were also in action in the long jump, with Javier coming eighth. Two senior medals followed at the Bolivarian Games, held on home turf in Trujillo, where he was third in the hurdles and second in the long jump (Jorge won both). The 2014 South American Games marked a coming of age for 22-year-old as he claimed his first senior gold medal in the 110 m hurdles in a personal best time of 13.77 seconds. He was also fifth in the long jump, beating his brother in both disciplines. The hurdles final at the 2014 Ibero-American Championships in Athletics proved to be a family affair as Jorge beat Javier to the title by a margin of five hundredths of a second. The winning time of 13.53 was a national record and Javier Mc Farlane's 13.57 seconds was a personal best – a very slow reaction time from Javier proved to be the difference between the two. He ended his season at the Pan American Sports Festival, coming fourth in the hurdles and ninth in the long jump.

Mc Farlane repeated continental level success at the 2015 South American Championships in Athletics, building on his South American Games title with a 110 m hurdles bronze medal in front of a home crowd in Lima, and finishing just one hundredth of a second behind his brother. He was also fourth in the long jump.

== Personal bests ==
- 110 metres hurdles – 13.52 seconds (2016)
- Long jump – 7.78 m (25 ft 6 1/4 in) (2016)
- Octathlon (youth) – 5772 points

== International competitions ==
Year	Competition	Venue	Position	Event	Notes
2008	South American Youth Championships	Lima, Peru	3rd	110 m hurdles (91.4 cm)	14.28
2008	South American Youth Championships	Lima, Peru	1st	Octathlon	5772
2008	South American U23 Championships	Lima, Peru	7th	110 m hurdles	15.93
2008	South American U23 Championships	Lima, Peru	3rd	4×100 m relay	42.77
2009	South American Championships	Lima, Peru	10th	110 m hurdles	15.51
2009	South American Championships	Lima, Peru	5th	Long jump	7.09 m
2009	South American Championships	Lima, Peru	5th	4×100 m relay	42.11
2009	South American Junior Championships	São Paulo, Brazil	—	110 m hurdles (99 cm)	DNF
2009	South American Junior Championships	São Paulo, Brazil	5th	Long jump	7.13 m
2010	South American U23 Championships	Medellín, Colombia	3rd	110 m hurdles	14.29
2010	South American U23 Championships	Medellín, Colombia	3rd	Long jump	7.62 m
2010	South American Games	Medellín, Colombia	3rd	110 m hurdles	14.29
2010	South American Games	Medellín, Colombia	2nd	Long jump	7.62 m
2010	World Junior Championships	Moncton, Canada	25th (h)	110m hurdles (99 cm)	14.10 (-2.2 m/s)
2010	World Junior Championships	Moncton, Canada	21st (q)	Long jump	7.31 m (0.0 m/s)
2011	Universiade	Shenzhen, China	29th (h)	110 m hurdles	14.71
2011	Universiade	Shenzhen, China	36th	Long jump	6.89 m
2011	Pan American Games	Guadalajara, Mexico	16th (h)	110 m hurdles	14.30
2012	South American U23 Championships	São Paulo, Brazil	4th	110 m hurdles	14.60
2013	South American Championships	Cartagena, Colombia	4th	110 m hurdles	13.85
2013	Bolivarian Games	Trujillo, Peru	3rd	110 m hurdles	14.00
2013	Bolivarian Games	Trujillo, Peru	2nd	Long jump	7.63 m
2014	South American Games	Santiago, Chile	1st	110 m hurdles	13.77
2014	South American Games	Santiago, Chile	5th	Long jump	7.62 m
2014	Ibero-American Championships	São Paulo, Brazil	2nd	110 m hurdles	13.57
2014	Pan American Sports Festival	Mexico City, Mexico	4th	110 m hurdles	13.68
2014	Pan American Sports Festival	Mexico City, Mexico	9th	Long jump	7.28 m
2015	South American Championships	Lima, Peru	3rd	110 m hurdles	14.00 (-1.2 m/s)
2016	Ibero-American Championships	Rio de Janeiro, Brazil	1st	110 m hurdles	13.55
2017	South American Championships	Asunción, Paraguay	3rd	110 m hurdles	13.76 (w)
2017	Bolivarian Games	Santa Marta, Colombia	1st	110 m hurdles	13.72
2018	World Indoor Championships	Birmingham, United Kingdom	34th (h)	60 m hurdles	8.00
2018	South American Games	Cochabamba, Bolivia	5th	110 m hurdles	13.75
2018	Ibero-American Championships	Trujillo, Peru	2nd	110 m hurdles	14.04
2019	South American Championships	Lima, Peru	6th	110 m hurdles	14.44
2019	Pan American Games	Lima, Peru	12th (h)	110 m hurdles	14.20
2021	South American Championships	Guayaquil, Ecuador	6th	110 m hurdles	14.19
