= Athletics at the 2010 South American Games – Men's high jump =

The Men's High Jump event at the 2010 South American Games was held on March 20 at 18:40.

== Medalists ==
Gold	Silver	Bronze
Diego Ferrín; Ecuador	Carlos Izquierdo; Colombia	Simon Villa; Colombia

== Records ==
Standing records prior to the 2010 South American Games
World record	Javier Sotomayor	Cuba	2.45m	Salamanca, Spain	27 July 1993
World Leading	Liam Zamel-Paez	Australia	2.25m	Brisbane, Australia	6 February 2010
South American record	Gilmar Mayo	Colombia	2.33m	Pereira, Colombia	17 October 1994
South American U23 record	Hugo Muñoz	Peru	2.30m	Lima, Peru	29 October 1995

== Results ==
Results were published.

=== Final ===
Rank	Athlete	Nationality	Attempt											Best Result	Notes
Rank	Athlete	Nationality	1.80	1.85	1.90	1.95	2.00	2.03	2.06	2.09	2.12	2.18	2.22	Best Result	Notes
1st place, gold medalist(s)	Diego Ferrín	Ecuador	–	–	–	–	o	–	o	–	xxo	o	xxx	2.18	
2nd place, silver medalist(s)	Carlos Izquiero	Colombia	–	–	–	o	o	o	o	o	xxx			2.09	
3rd place, bronze medalist(s)	Simon Villa	Colombia	–	–	–	o	o	–	o	xxo	xxx			2.09	
4	Carlos Layoy	Argentina	–	–	–	o	o	–	xo	xxo	xxx			2.09	
5	Arturo Chávez	(Peru) Perú	–	–	–	–	xo	xo	o	xxo	xxx			2.09	
6	Quentin Siberie	Netherlands Antilles	o	xo	o	o	xo	o	xxx					2.03	^{†}
7	Talles Silva	Brazil	–	–	o	o	xxx							1.95	
8	Jose Pires	Brazil	–	–	–	xo	xxx							1.95	
9	Cristóbal Gómez	Chile	o	xo	xxx									1.85	

^{†}: Not eligible for the South American Under-23 Championships.

== See also ==
- 2010 South American Under-23 Championships in Athletics
