= Carlos Layoy =

Argentine high jumper (born 1991)

Personal information
- Full name: Carlos Daniel Layoy
- Born: February 26, 1991 (age 35) Paso de los Libres, Argentina
- Education: Instituto de Capacitacion Aduanera
- Height: 1.88 m (6 ft 2 in)
- Weight: 75 kg (165 lb)

Sport
- Sport: Athletics
- Event: High jump

Carlos Daniel Layoy (born 26 February 1991) is an Argentine athlete specialising in the high jump. He won bronze medals at the 2014 and 2018 South American Games.

His personal best in the event is 2.25 metres set in Cochabamba in 2018. This result makes him the joint national record holder.

== International competitions ==
Year	Competition	Venue	Position	Notes
Representing Argentina
2007	South American Junior Championships	São Paulo, Brazil	7th	1.95 m
2007	Pan American Junior Championships	São Paulo, Brazil	–	NM
2008	South American Youth Championships	Lima, Peru	1st	2.08 m
2009	South American Junior Championships	São Paulo, Brazil	1st	2.14 m
2009	Pan American Junior Championships	Port of Spain, Trinidad and Tobago	5th	2.10 m
2010	South American Games	Medellín, Colombia	4th	2.09 m
2010	Ibero-American Championships	San Fernando, Spain	3rd	2.18 m
2010	World Junior Championships	Moncton, Canada	7th	2.17 m
2011	South American Championships	Buenos Aires, Argentina	3rd	2.20 m
2011	Pan American Games	Guadalajara, Mexico	10th	2.18 m
2012	Ibero-American Championships	Barquisimeto, Venezuela	6th	2.19 m
2012	South American U-23 Championships	São Paulo, Brazil	2nd	2.19 m
2013	South American Championships	Cartagena, Colombia	5th	2.19 m
2014	South American Games	Santiago, Chile	3rd	2.18 m
2014	Ibero-American Championships	São Paulo, Brazil	4th	2.21 m
2015	South American Championships	Lima, Peru	6th	2.05 m
2016	Ibero-American Championships	Rio de Janeiro, Brazil	8th	2.15 m
2017	South American Championships	Asunción, Paraguay	4th	2.16 m
2017	Universiade	Taipei, Taiwan	9th	2.20 m
2018	South American Games	Cochabamba, Bolivia	2nd	2.25 m
2018	Ibero-American Championships	Trujillo, Peru	1st	2.21 m
2019	South American Championships	Lima, Peru	4th	2.10 m
2019	Pan American Games	Lima, Peru	11th	2.10 m
2020	South American Indoor Championships	Cochabamba, Bolivia	4th	2.16 m
2021	South American Championships	Guayaquil, Ecuador	3rd	2.17 m
2022	South American Indoor Championships	Cochabamba, Bolivia	2nd	2.16 m
2022	Ibero-American Championships	La Nucía, Spain	5th	2.18 m
2022	World Championships	Eugene, United States	21st (q)	2.21 m
2022	South American Games	Asunción, Paraguay	–	NM
2023	South American Championships	São Paulo, Brazil	1st	2.23 m
2023	World Championships	Budapest, Hungary	–	NM
2023	Pan American Games	Santiago, Chile	13th	2.15 m
2024	South American Indoor Championships	Cochabamba, Bolivia	3rd	2.15 m
2024	Ibero-American Championships	Cuiabá, Brazil	4th	2.15 m
2025	South American Championships	Mar del Plata, Argentina	7th	2.00 m
2026	South American Games	Santa Fe, Argentina	6th	2.05 m
