= Athletics at the 2010 South American Games – Women's 10,000 metres =

The Women's 10,000m event at the 2010 South American Games was held in March 20 at 17:15. The competition was not part of the South American Games, because the minimum number of 4 participating nations was not reached, but counted only for the South American Under-23 Championships.

== Medalists ==
Gold	Silver	Bronze
Yoni Ninahuaman (Peru) Perú	Aura Rojas; Colombia	

== Records ==
Standing records prior to the 2010 South American Games
World record	Wang Junxia	China	29:31.78	Beijing, China	8 September 1993
World Leading	Andrea Woodvine	Great Britain	33:29.90	Tauranga, New Zealand	6 January 2010
South American record	Carmem de Oliveira	Brazil	31:47.76	Stuttgart, Germany	21 August 1993
South American U23 record	Erika Alejandra Olivera	Chile	33:23.12	Concepción, Chile	30 November 1996

== Results ==
Results were published.

Rank	Athlete	Nationality	Result	Notes
1st place, gold medalist(s)	Yoni Ninahuaman	(Peru) Perú	37:09.92	
2nd place, silver medalist(s)	Aura Rojas	Colombia	37:26.67	
–	Ana Brandão	Brazil	DNF	
–	Nayara Chagas	Brazil	DNF	
–	Karina Villazana	(Peru) Perú	DSQ	^{†}

^{†}: Karina Villazana from (Peru) Perú was initially 1st in 36:48.53, but was disqualified, because being tested positive for cocaine abuse.

Intermediate times:

1000m	3:35.29	Karina Villazana	(Peru) Perú
2000m	7:00.94	Karina Villazana	(Peru) Perú
3000m	10:35.41	Karina Villazana	(Peru) Perú
4000m	14:13.28	Karina Villazana	(Peru) Perú
5000m	17:54.23	Karina Villazana	(Peru) Perú
6000m	21:38.33	Karina Villazana	(Peru) Perú
7000m	25:25.04	Karina Villazana	(Peru) Perú
8000m	29:13.62	Karina Villazana	(Peru) Perú
9000m	33:03.77	Karina Villazana	(Peru) Perú

== See also ==
- 2010 South American Under-23 Championships in Athletics
