= Isidro Montoya =

Colombian sprinter (born 1990)

Personal information
- Full name: Isidro Montoya Valencia
- Born: October 3, 1990 (age 36) Turbo, Antioquia, Colombia

Sport
- Country: Colombia
- Sport: Athletics
- Event: Sprint
Medal record
Men's athletics
Representing Colombia
South American Championships
Bronze medal – third place	2013 Cartagena	100 m
- Updated on 10 December 2014

Isidro Montoya Valencia (born 3 November 1990) is a Colombian sprinter. He competed in the 100 metres at the 2012 Summer Olympics in London.

== Personal bests ==
- 100 m: 10.15 s (wind: +2.0 m/s) – Cali, Colombia, 29 August 2014
- 200 m: 20.71 s (wind: -1.1 m/s) – Medellín, Colombia, 29 April 2017

== Achievements ==
Year	Competition	Venue	Position	Event	Notes
Representing the Colombia
2009	South American Junior Championships	São Paulo, Brazil	3rd	100 m	10.63 (wind: +0.4 m/s)
2009	South American Junior Championships	São Paulo, Brazil	4th	200 m	21.95 (wind: -0.3 m/s)
2009	South American Junior Championships	São Paulo, Brazil	2nd	4×100 m relay	41.26
2010	South American Under-23 Championships / South American Games	Medellín, Colombia	1st	100 m	10.25 w (wind: +2.2 m/s)
2010	South American Under-23 Championships / South American Games	Medellín, Colombia	1st	4×100 m relay	39.85
2010	Ibero-American Championships	San Fernando, Spain	8th	100 m	10.85 (wind: -0.2 m/s)
2010	Ibero-American Championships	San Fernando, Spain	3rd	4×100 m relay	39.76
2010	Central American and Caribbean Games	Mayagüez, Puerto Rico	11th (h)	100 m	10.34 (wind: +1.1 m/s)
2010	Central American and Caribbean Games	Mayagüez, Puerto Rico	5th	4×100 m relay	39.20
2011	South American Championships	Buenos Aires, Argentina	11th (h)	100 m	10.71 (wind: +0.4 m/s)
2011	South American Championships	Buenos Aires, Argentina	2nd	4×100 m relay	39.88
2011	Central American and Caribbean Championships	Mayagüez, Puerto Rico	7th	4×100 m relay	40.73
2011	Pan American Games	Guadalajara, Mexico	22nd (h)	100 m	10.60 (wind: -2.0 m/s)
2011	Pan American Games	Guadalajara, Mexico	—	4×100 m relay	DNF
2012	Olympic Games	London, United Kingdom	7th (h)	100 m	10.54 (wind: -1.4 m/s)
2012	South American U-23 Championships	São Paulo, Brazil	2nd	100 m	10.45 (wind: +0.3 m/s)
2012	South American U-23 Championships	São Paulo, Brazil	2nd	4×100 m relay	40.14
2013	South American Championships	Cartagena, Colombia	3rd	100 m	10.38 (wind: +1.3 m/s)
2013	South American Championships	Cartagena, Colombia	2nd	4×100 m relay	39.76
2013	Bolivarian Games	Trujillo, Peru	2nd	100 m	10.63 (wind: -0.3 m/s)
2013	Bolivarian Games	Trujillo, Peru	3rd	4×100 m relay	39.86
2014	Ibero-American Championships	São Paulo, Brazil	3rd	100 m	10.32 (wind: +0.6 m/s)
2014	Pan American Sports Festival	Mexico City, Mexico	3rd	100m	10.31 A (wind: -1.3 m/s)
2014	Central American and Caribbean Games	Xalapa, Mexico	5th	100m	10.33 A (wind: +0.9 m/s)
2015	South American Championships	Lima, Peru	8th	100m	12.86 (wind: -1.1 m/s)
