= Diego Cavalcanti =

Brazilian sprinter (born 1991)

Personal information
- Full name: Diego Henrique de Farias Cavalcanti
- Nationality: Brazil
- Born: 18 March 1991 (age 35) Natal, Rio Grande do Norte

Sport
- Sport: Running
- Event: Sprints

Achievements and titles
- Personal best(s): 100 m: 10.30 (Port of Spain 2009); 200 m: 20.57 (São Paulo 2011)
Medal record
Men's athletics
Representing Brazil
Pan American Junior Championships
Silver medal – second place	2009 Port of Spain	4×100 m relay
Bronze medal – third place	2009 Port of Spain	100 m
South American Junior Championships
Gold medal – first place	2009 São Paulo	200 m
Gold medal – first place	2009 São Paulo	4×100 m relay
Silver medal – second place	2009 São Paulo	100 m
South American Youth Championships
Gold medal – first place	2008 Lima	100 m
Gold medal – first place	2008 Lima	200 m
Gold medal – first place	2008 Lima	Medley relay

Diego Henrique de Farias Cavalcanti (born 18 March 1991 in Natal, Rio Grande do Norte) is a Brazilian sprinter.

== Career ==
He was part of the Brazilian squad in the 4 × 100 m relay at the 2011 World Championships in Athletics in Daegu, South Korea.

== Achievements ==
Year	Competition	Venue	Position	Event	Notes
Representing Brazil
2008	South American Youth Championships	Lima, Perú	1st	100 m	10.96 s (wind: -3.9 m/s)
2008	South American Youth Championships	Lima, Perú	1st	200 m	21.86 s (wind: -0.4 m/s)
2008	South American Youth Championships	Lima, Perú	1st	1000 m medley relay	1:54.10 min
