= Braian Toledo =

Argentine javelin thrower (1993–2020)

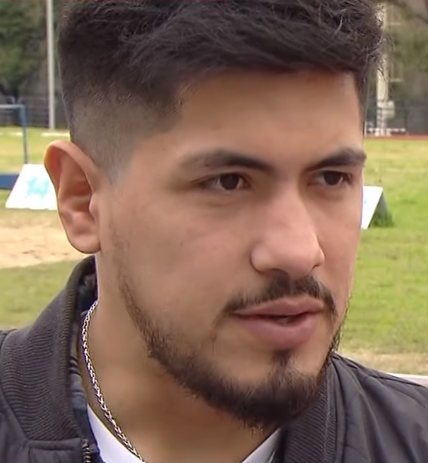
- Toledo in 2019

Personal information
- Full name: Braian Ezequiel Toledo
- Nationality: Argentina
- Born: 8 September 1993 Marcos Paz, Argentina
- Died: 26 February 2020 (aged 26)
- Height: 1.86 m (6 ft 1 in)
- Weight: 90 kg (198 lb)

Sport
- Sport: Field
- Event: Javelin throw

Achievements and titles
- Personal bests: 800 g: 83.32 m (Beijing 2015); 700 g: 89.34 m (Mar del Plata 2010)
Medal record
Men's athletics
Representing Argentina
Pan American Games
Bronze medal – third place	2011 Guadalajara	Javelin throw
Ibero-American Championships
Gold medal – first place	2012 Barquisimeto	Javelin throw
World Junior Championships
Silver medal – second place	2012 Barcelona	Javelin throw
Pan American Junior Championships
Gold medal – first place	2009 Port-of-Spain	Javelin throw
Gold medal – first place	2011 Miramar	Javelin throw
Summer Youth Olympics
Gold medal – first place	2010 Singapore	Javelin throw
World Youth Championships
Bronze medal – third place	2009 Brixen	Javelin throw
South American Under-23 Championships
Gold medal – first place	2012 São Paulo	Javelin throw
Gold medal – first place	2014 Montevideo	Javelin throw
South American Junior Championships
Gold medal – first place	2011 Medellín	Javelin throw
Silver medal – second place	2009 São Paulo	Javelin throw
South American Youth Championships
Gold medal – first place	2010 Santiago	Javelin throw
Bronze medal – third place	2008 Lima	Javelin throw

Braian Ezequiel Toledo (8 September 1993 – 26 February 2020) was an Argentine javelin thrower who improved the World Youth Best in boys' javelin throw by more than six metres. (Note: The mark is termed a World Best Performance (rather than World Record) as the sport's governing body, IAAF, does not officially ratify world youth records. The implement used was the current youth standard 700 g javelin, as opposed to the 800 g junior and adult men's javelin.)

He won the inaugural javelin title at the 2010 Youth Olympics in Singapore and also won gold at the 2010 South American Youth Championships and 2009 Pan American Junior Championships.

In 2011 Braian protagonized a publicity spot for the campaign of Cristina Fernández de Kirchner in the presidential elections. In 2012 he participated, along with other Olympic athletes, in a campaign of Grandmothers of the Plaza de Mayo to recover the grandchildren who were robbed during the National Reorganization Process.

Since November 2016 he had Kari Ihalainen as coach and in April 2017 he moved to Kuortane, Finland, with the aim of improving his performance in view of the 2020 Olympic Games.

On 26 February 2020, Toledo died in a motorcycle accident. Among those to pay tribute to the athlete were Diego Maradona and the president of the Argentine Olympic Committee, Gerardo Werthein.

== Youth career ==
Born and raised in Marcos Paz, Braian Toledo grew up in a small one-bedroom house with his mother and two younger brothers. Athletics coach Gustavo Osorio gave a class at Toledo's school and invited him to join his training group. Initially focused on football – the most prominent and potentially profitable sport in Argentina – Toledo made the decision to focus solely on track and field instead at the age of twelve.

He managed a bronze medal at the South American Youth Championships in 2008. However, it was at the 2009 World Youth Championships in Brixen, Italy that he first made a name for himself. In a very tight final on 23 July, Toledo languished in seventh place until round five, when he threw a new personal best of 73.44 metres. This was enough to win him the bronze against boys a year older, just 56 centimetres from gold.

After that his results improved extremely rapidly. In July he took the silver medal at the 2009 South American Junior Championships in Athletics and then won the gold medal in the 2009 Pan American Junior Athletics Championships, throwing a new age-15 world best of 69.84m with the men's 800 gram implement. Later in the year, he made large improvements to his personal best with the youth javelin, with his eventual best mark of 79.25, thrown in Córdoba on 11 October, the top mark that year among throwers born in 1993 or later.

=== World Youth Bests ===
On 13 February 2010, Toledo improved his personal best by more than five metres with a first-round throw of 84.85 metres in Buenos Aires, Argentina. This by a comfortable margin eclipsed the world youth best of 83.02, set the previous year by Russia's Valeriy Iordan. He then made a huge improvement to the world best on 6 March 2010, in Mar del Plata, throwing a new record of 89.34, again on his first attempt. This mark was some 25 metres up from his personal best just a year before.

Toledo won the javelin at the inaugural 2010 Youth Olympics, contested in the city-state of Singapore in August 2010. His winning mark of 81.78 was almost five metres ahead of United States' Devin Bogert in second place. He won the national youth title in September with a throw of 85.64 m (his second best ever) and in October he competed at the South American Youth Championships, easily securing victory with the third best ever throw for a youth athlete.

== Junior career ==
In late 2010, Toledo started competing with the 800 g standard javelin. He broke the Argentine juniors record with a 71.12 m throw on 23 October, and then broke his own record another four times during the 2010 Evita Games held in Mar del Plata on November, with his best mark at 73.07 m. He was awarded the Olimpia de Plata by Argentine sport journalists at the end of the year, acknowledging his position as the best Argentine in the sport of athletics. Despite Toledo's raised profile and the growing expectations nationally, his coach Osorio stated that both of them were more focused on training and improving. Osorio also pointed out that much had been achieved, in spite of the lack of high-quality facilities in the region.

In his last year as a junior, Toledo won the silver medal in the 2012 World Junior Championships in Athletics in Barcelona. He claimed the javelin title at the 2012 Ibero-American Championships in Athletics and the following month he threw an Argentine and South American junior record of 79.87 metres. He made his Olympic debut at the 2012 London Games, but did not progress beyond qualifying. He won the gold medal at the 2012 South American Under-23 Championships in Athletics with a championship record throw.

== Competition record ==
Year	Competition	Venue	Position	Event	Notes
Representing Argentina
2008	South American Youth Championships	Lima, Peru	3rd	Javelin throw (700 g)	60.41 m
2009	World Youth Championships	Brixen, Italy	3rd	Javelin throw (700 g)	73.44 m
2009	South American Junior Championships	São Paulo, Brazil	2nd	Javelin throw	69.63 m
2009	Pan American Junior Championships	Port of Spain, Trinidad and Tobago	1st	Javelin throw	69.84 m
2010	Youth Olympic Games	Singapore	1st	Javelin throw	81.78 m
2010	South American Youth Championships	Santiago, Chile	1st	Javelin throw (700 g)	85.32 m
2011	South American Championships	Buenos Aires, Argentina	4th	Javelin throw	71.05 m
2011	Pan American Junior Championships	Miramar, United States	1st	Javelin throw	76.40 m
2011	South American Junior Championships	Medellín, Colombia	1st	Javelin throw	74.04 m
2011	Pan American Games	Guadalajara, Mexico	3rd	Javelin throw	79.53 m
2012	Ibero-American Championships	Barquisimeto, Venezuela	1st	Javelin throw	77.33 m
2012	World Junior Championships	Barcelona, Spain	2nd	Javelin throw	77.09 m
2012	Olympic Games	London, United Kingdom	30th (q)	Javelin throw	76.87 m
2012	South American Under-23 Championships	São Paulo, Brazil	1st	Javelin throw	78.49 m
2013	South American Championships	Cartagena, Colombia	3rd	Javelin throw	75.33 m
2014	South American Games	Santiago, Chile	5th	Javelin throw	72.52 m
2014	South American Under-23 Championships	Montevideo, Uruguay	1st	Javelin throw	77.75 m
2015	South American Championships	Lima, Peru	2nd	Javelin throw	79.34 m
2015	Pan American Games	Toronto, Canada	4th	Javelin throw	77.68 m
2015	World Championships	Beijing, China	10th	Javelin throw	80.27 m
2016	Ibero-American Championships	Rio de Janeiro, Brazil	4th	Javelin throw	78.53 m
2016	Olympic Games	Rio de Janeiro, Brazil	10th	Javelin throw	79.81 m
2017	South American Championships	Asunción, Paraguay	1st	Javelin throw	79.93 m
2017	World Championships	London, United Kingdom	28th (q)	Javelin throw	75.29 m
2018	South American Games	Cochabamba, Bolivia	3rd	Javelin throw	78.57 m

== Seasonal bests by year ==
- 2009 – 69.84 m
- 2010 – 73.07
- 2011 – 79.53
- 2012 – 79.87
- 2013 – 78.66
- 2014 – 77.75
- 2015 – 83.32 NR
- 2016 – 81.96
- 2017 – 80.83
- 2018 – 78.57
- 2019 – 76.35
