= 2017 South American Championships in Athletics – Results =

These are the full results of the 2017 South American Championships in Athletics which took place in Luque, Asunción, Paraguay, from 23 to 25 June at the Pista Comité Olímpico Paraguayo.

== Men's results ==
=== 100 meters ===
Heats – 23 June
Wind:
Heat 1: +3.4 m/s, Heat 2: +2.4 m/s, Heat 3: +2.3 m/s

Rank	Heat	Name	Nationality	Time	Notes
1	3	Bruno de Barros	Brazil	10.22	Q
2	2	Diego Palomeque	Colombia	10.24	Q
3	3	Jhonny Rentería	Colombia	10.26	Q
4	1	Andy Martínez	Peru	10.33	Q
5	2	Felipe Bardi	Brazil	10.34	Q
6	3	Jesús Rafael Vázquez	Venezuela	10.37	q
7	1	Danny Vanan	Suriname	10.39	Q
8	1	Álvaro Cassiani	Venezuela	10.50	q
9	3	Matias Robledo	Argentina	10.51	
10	2	Ifrish Alberg	Suriname	10.52	
11	2	Carlos Perlaza	Ecuador	10.55	
12	3	Victor Owen	Guyana	10.57	
13	2	Jorge Caracassis	Argentina	10.66	
14	1	Christopher Ortiz	Paraguay	10.67	
15	1	Jhon Valencia	Ecuador	10.68	
16	1	Javier Pinilla	Chile	10.74	
17	2	Fabrizio Aquino	Paraguay	10.77	
18	3	Ángel Rickenberg	Chile	10.78	
19	3	Carlos Aban	Bolivia	10.80	
20	1	Facundo Riera	Bolivia	10.81	

Final – 23 June
Wind:
+1.9 m/s

Rank	Lane	Name	Nationality	Time	Notes
1st place, gold medalist(s)	5	Diego Palomeque	Colombia	10.11	NR
2nd place, silver medalist(s)	6	Bruno de Barros	Brazil	10.22	SB
3rd place, bronze medalist(s)	7	Felipe Bardi	Brazil	10.29	
4	4	Andy Martínez	Peru	10.29	
5	3	Jhonny Rentería	Colombia	10.31	
6	8	Danny Vanan	Suriname	10.42	
7	1	Álvaro Cassiani	Venezuela	10.49	
8	2	Jesús Rafael Vázquez	Venezuela	10.52	

=== 200 meters ===
Heats – 24 June
Wind:
Heat 1: +3.3 m/s, Heat 2: +3.0 m/s, Heat 3: +3.0 m/s

Rank	Heat	Name	Nationality	Time	Notes
1	1	Bruno de Barros	Brazil	20.41	Q
2	1	Bernardo Baloyes	Colombia	20.51	Q
3	3	Jesús Rafael Vázquez	Venezuela	20.98	Q
4	1	Virgilio Griggs	Panama	20.99	q
5	1	Álvaro Cassiani	Venezuela	21.02	q
6	2	Fredy Maidana	Paraguay	21.17	Q
7	3	Enzo Faulbaum	Chile	21.26	Q
8	2	Aldemir da Silva Júnior	Brazil	21.27	Q
9	1	Carlos Perlaza	Ecuador	21.34	
10	2	Danny Vanan	Suriname	21.35	
11	2	Daniel Londero	Argentina	21.44	
12	3	Victor Owen	Guyana	21.47	
13	3	Jesús Manuel Cáceres	Paraguay	21.51	
14	3	Jhon Valencia	Ecuador	21.61	
15	3	Carlos Aban	Bolivia	21.98	
16	2	Roberto Bustillo	Bolivia	22.04	
	2	Javier Pinilla	Chile	DNF	
	1	Andy Martínez	Peru	DNS	

Final – 25 June
Wind:
+2.2 m/s

Rank	Lane	Name	Nationality	Time	Notes
1st place, gold medalist(s)	3	Bernardo Baloyes	Colombia	20.36	
2nd place, silver medalist(s)	2	Álvaro Cassiani	Venezuela	20.90	
3rd place, bronze medalist(s)	1	Virgilio Griggs	Panama	21.11	
4	4	Fredy Maidana	Paraguay	21.16	
5	8	Enzo Faulbaum	Chile	21.41	
	6	Jesús Rafael Vázquez	Venezuela	DNS	
	7	Aldemir da Silva Júnior	Brazil	DNS	
	5	Bruno de Barros	Brazil	DNS	

=== 400 meters ===
Heats – 23 June

Rank	Heat	Name	Nationality	Time	Notes
1	1	Yilmar Herrera	Colombia	47.10	Q
2	2	Jhon Perlaza	Colombia	47.19	Q
3	1	Alberth Bravo	Venezuela	47.20	Q
4	2	Winston George	Guyana	47.39	Q
5	2	Kelvis Padrino	Venezuela	47.70	Q
6	1	Lucas Carvalho	Brazil	47.81	Q
7	1	Walter Rotela	Argentina	48.56	q
8	1	Mateo Pascual	Uruguay	48.56	q
9	1	Rafael Muñoz	Chile	48.94	
10	1	Ramón Silva	Paraguay	49.00	
11	2	Emerson Chala	Ecuador	49.19	
12	2	Nilo Duré	Paraguay	49.38	
13	1	Edisson Acuña	Ecuador	49.47	
14	2	Sergio Aldea	Chile	49.81	
15	2	Falcon Fagundez	Uruguay	49.92	
16	2	Martin Rojas	Argentina	50.26	

Final – 23 June

Rank	Lane	Name	Nationality	Time	Notes
1st place, gold medalist(s)	4	Winston George	Guyana	45.42	
2nd place, silver medalist(s)	6	Jhon Perlaza	Colombia	45.77	
3rd place, bronze medalist(s)	3	Yilmar Herrera	Colombia	46.02	
4	8	Lucas Carvalho	Brazil	46.11	
5	7	Kelvis Padrino	Venezuela	46.67	
6	5	Alberth Bravo	Venezuela	47.62	
7	1	Mateo Pascual	Uruguay	48.10	
8	2	Walter Rotela	Argentina	48.19	

=== 800 meters ===
24 June

Rank	Name	Nationality	Time	Notes
1st place, gold medalist(s)	Leandro Paris	Argentina	1:49.82	
2nd place, silver medalist(s)	Lutimar Paes	Brazil	1:50.27	
3rd place, bronze medalist(s)	Jonathan Bolados	Chile	1:50.30	
4	Jelssin Robledo	Colombia	1:51.08	
5	Cristopher Jarpa	Chile	1:51.19	
6	Lucirio Antonio Garrido	Venezuela	1:51.36	
7	Jean Jácome	Ecuador	1:52.09	
8	Jairo Moreira	Uruguay	1:54.82	
9	Eduardo Gregorio	Uruguay	1:54.82	
10	Christian Venialgo	Paraguay	1:56.31	
11	Giovanni Villalba	Paraguay	1:59.26	

=== 1500 meters ===
23 June

Rank	Name	Nationality	Time	Notes
1st place, gold medalist(s)	Federico Bruno	Argentina	3:45.28	
2nd place, silver medalist(s)	Carlos Díaz	Chile	3:45.69	
3rd place, bronze medalist(s)	Carlos San Martín	Colombia	3:49.99	
4	Joaquin Arbe	Argentina	3:52.88	
5	Eduardo Gregorio	Uruguay	3:53.50	
6	Christian Vásconez	Ecuador	3:54.07	
7	Mario Bazán	Peru	3:54.96	
8	Víctor Aguilar	Bolivia	3:57.47	
9	Gerson Montes	Ecuador	3:58.71	
10	Cristopher Jarpa	Chile	3:59.25	
11	Hugo Cespedes	Paraguay	4:17.23	
12	Christian Venialgo	Paraguay	4:19.26	

=== 5000 meters ===
25 June

Rank	Name	Nationality	Time	Notes
1st place, gold medalist(s)	Víctor Aravena	Chile	13:57.45	
2nd place, silver medalist(s)	Ederson Pereira	Brazil	13:59.20	
3rd place, bronze medalist(s)	Iván Darío González	Colombia	14:15.76	
4	Mariano Mastromarino	Argentina	14:25.06	
5	Vidal Basco	Bolivia	14:26.77	
6	Martín Cuestas	Uruguay	14:28.61	
7	Cristhian Zamora	Uruguay	14:37.40	
8	Daniel Toroya	Bolivia	14:40.14	
9	Leslie Encina	Chile	14:40.22	
10	Walter Nina	Peru	14:57.31	
11	Derlys Ayala	Paraguay	15:00.30	
12	Christian Vásconez	Ecuador	15:00.96	
13	Orlando Javier Elizeche	Paraguay	16:37.48	
	Rene Champi	Peru	DNF	
	Carlos San Martín	Colombia	DNF	
	Federico Bruno	Argentina	?	

=== 10,000 meters ===
23 June

Rank	Name	Nationality	Time	Notes
1st place, gold medalist(s)	Bayron Piedra	Ecuador	29:03.73	SB
2nd place, silver medalist(s)	Luis Ostos	Peru	29:06.74	
3rd place, bronze medalist(s)	Miguel Amador	Colombia	29:35.17	
4	Ederson Pereira	Brazil	29:39.85	
5	Andrés Zamora	Uruguay	30:11.16	
6	Daniel Toroya	Bolivia	30:27.27	
7	Leslie Encina	Chile	30:49.14	
	Vidal Basco	Bolivia	DNF	
	Derlys Ayala	Paraguay	DNF	
	Cristian Pacheco	Peru	DNF	
	Mariano Mastromarino	Argentina	DNF	
	Iván Darío González	Colombia	DNF	
	Orlando Javier Elizeche	Paraguay	DNF	
	Nicolás Cuestas	Uruguay	DNF	

=== 110 meters hurdles ===
24 June
Wind: +3.8 m/s

Rank	Lane	Name	Nationality	Time	Notes
1st place, gold medalist(s)	3	Eduardo de Deus	Brazil	13.42	
2nd place, silver medalist(s)	5	Éder Souza	Brazil	13.49	
3rd place, bronze medalist(s)	8	Javier McFarlane	Peru	13.76	
4	6	Jorge McFarlane	Peru	13.87	
5	4	Yeison Rivas	Colombia	13.95	
6	7	Agustín Carrera	Argentina	14.16	
7	2	Víctor Arancibia	Chile	14.59	
8	1	Marcos Herrera	Ecuador	20.05	

=== 400 meters hurdles ===
Heats – 24 June

Rank	Heat	Name	Nationality	Time	Notes
1	1	Alfredo Sepúlveda	Chile	51.26	Q
2	1	Guillermo Ruggeri	Argentina	51.55	Q
3	1	Emerson Chala	Ecuador	51.60	Q
4	1	Andrés Silva	Uruguay	51.76	q
5	2	Alberth Bravo	Venezuela	51.79	Q
6	2	Yeison Rivas	Colombia	51.94	Q
7	1	Wilson Bello	Venezuela	52.06	q
8	2	Jaime Rodríguez	Argentina	54.98	Q
9	2	Carlos Betancourt	Ecuador	55.86	
10	1	Ramón Silva	Paraguay	55.88	
11	2	Lucas Britez	Paraguay	1:03.15	

Final – 24 June

Rank	Lane	Name	Nationality	Time	Notes
1st place, gold medalist(s)	5	Guillermo Ruggeri	Argentina	49.72	NR
2nd place, silver medalist(s)	3	Alberth Bravo	Venezuela	50.36	
3rd place, bronze medalist(s)	6	Alfredo Sepúlveda	Chile	50.37	
4	2	Andrés Silva	Uruguay	50.58	
5	4	Yeison Rivas	Colombia	51.22	
6	8	Emerson Chala	Ecuador	51.37	
7	7	Jaime Rodríguez	Argentina	51.81	
8	1	Wilson Bello	Venezuela	51.96	

=== 3000 meters steeplechase ===
24 June

Rank	Name	Nationality	Time	Notes
1st place, gold medalist(s)	José Peña	Venezuela	8:45.93	
2nd place, silver medalist(s)	Gerard Giraldo	Colombia	8:51.59	
3rd place, bronze medalist(s)	Mario Bazán	Peru	8:51.97	
4	Roberto Tello	Chile	9:00.30	
5	Joaquín Arbe	Argentina	9:07.56	
6	Gerson Tulcanazo	Ecuador	9:21.21	
7	Carlos António Ortiz	Argentina	9:45.17	
8	Víctor Aguilar	Bolivia	10:03.02	
9	Pedro Garay	Paraguay	10:22.28	

=== 4 × 100 meters relay ===
24 July

Rank	Lane	Nation	Competitors	Time	Notes
1st place, gold medalist(s)	5	Brazil	Flávio Barbosa, Aldemir da Silva Júnior, Bruno de Barros, Felipe Bardi	39.47	
2nd place, silver medalist(s)	4	Colombia	Deivy Díaz, Diego Palomeque, Bernardo Baloyes, Jhonny Rentería	39.67	
3rd place, bronze medalist(s)	3	Venezuela	Yeiker Mendoza, Arturo Ramírez, Álvaro Cassiani, Jesús Rafael Vázquez	39.74	
4	6	Ecuador	Anderson Quintero, Jhon Valencia, Carlos Perlaza, Álex Quiñónez	40.61	
5	7	Argentina	Jorge Caracassis, Jaime Rodríguez, Daniel Londero, Matias Robledo	40.77	
6	1	Bolivia	Anderson Pinedo, Facundo Riera, Roberto Bustillo, Carlos Aban	42.14	
7	2	Paraguay	Giovanni Díaz, Christopher Ortiz, Jesús Manuel Cáceres, Fabrizio Aquino	43.82	
	8	Chile	Camilo Olivares, Enzo Faulbaum, Ángel Rickenberg, Daniel Pineda	DQ	R144.2

=== 4 × 400 meters relay ===
25 July

Rank	Nation	Competitors	Time	Notes
1st place, gold medalist(s)	Colombia	Jhon Solís, Diego Palomeque, Yilmar Herrera, Jhon Perlaza	3:05.02	
2nd place, silver medalist(s)	Brazil	Bruno de Barros, Alexander Russo, Hugo de Sousa, Lucas Carvalho	3:07.32	
3rd place, bronze medalist(s)	Venezuela	Alberth Bravo, Alberto Aguilar, Kelvis Padrino, Omar Longart	3:07.74	
4	Chile	Sergio Aldea, Enzo Faulbaum, Rafael Muñoz, Alfredo Sepúlveda	3:13.64	
5	Argentina	Jaime Rodríguez, Walter Rotela, Leandro Paris, Guillermo Ruggeri	3:13.96	
6	Ecuador	Carlos Perlaza, Edisson Acuña, Carlos Betancourt, Emerson Chala	3:16.44	
7	Paraguay	Miguel Ángel Cabrera, Jesús Manuel Cáceres, Nilo Duré, Ramón Silva	3:21.26	

=== 20,000 meters walk ===
25 June

Rank	Name	Nationality	Time	Notes
1st place, gold medalist(s)	Mauricio Arteaga	Ecuador	1:24:40.0	
2nd place, silver medalist(s)	Jhon Castañeda	Colombia	1:25:04.5	
3rd place, bronze medalist(s)	César Rodríguez	Peru	1:25:58.3	
4	Juan Manuel Cano	Argentina	1:26:45.1	
5	Marco Antonio Rodríguez	Bolivia	1:27:53.9	
6	Yassir Cabrera	Panama	1:31:10.2	
	Oscar Villavicencio	Ecuador	DQ	R230.7(a)
	Moacir Zimmermann	Brazil	DQ	R230.7(a)
	Luis Henry Campos	Peru	DQ	R230.7(a)
	Richard Vargas	Venezuela	DNF	
	Pablo Rodríguez	Bolivia	DNF	

=== High jump ===
23 June

Rank	Name	Nationality	1.95	2.00	2.05	2.10	2.13	2.16	2.19	2.22	2.25	2.28	2.31	2.34	Result	Notes
1st place, gold medalist(s)	Eure Yáñez	Venezuela	–	–	–	o	–	o	o	o	o	xo	xo	xr	2.31	CR, NR
2nd place, silver medalist(s)	Talles Frederico Silva	Brazil	–	–	–	o	–	o	xo	xo	o	xxo	xxx		2.28	
3rd place, bronze medalist(s)	Fernando Ferreira	Brazil	–	–	–	o	o	o	xo	xxx					2.19	
4	Carlos Layoy	Argentina	–	–	o	o	xxo	xxo	xxx						2.16	
5	Cristbal Hurtado	Chile	xo	o	o	xo	xxo	xxx							2.13	

=== Pole vault ===
23 June

Rank	Name	Nationality	4.30	4.50	4.70	4.90	5.00	5.10	5.30	5.45	5.60	5.76	Result	Notes
1st place, gold medalist(s)	Germán Chiaraviglio	Argentina	–	–	–	–	–	–	o	o	xo	xxr	5.60	
2nd place, silver medalist(s)	Walter Viáfara	Colombia	–	–	–	xxo	–	xo	xxx				5.10	
3rd place, bronze medalist(s)	Rubén Benítez	Argentina	–	–	–	o	xo	xxx					5.00	
4	Heberth Gómez	Colombia	–	–	–	xxo	xxx						4.90	
5	Felipe Fuentes	Chile	–	–	xo	xxx							4.70	
6	Martin Castañares	Uruguay	o	o	xxx								4.50	
7	Joaquin Leon	Peru	–	xo	xxx								4.50	
	Augusto Dutra de Oliveira	Brazil	–	–	–	–	–	–	xxx				NM	
	José Pacho	Ecuador											DNS	

=== Long jump ===
24 June

Rank	Name	Nationality	Result	Notes
1st place, gold medalist(s)	Paulo Sérgio Oliveira	Brazil	7.93w	
2nd place, silver medalist(s)	Emiliano Lasa	Uruguay	7.89	
3rd place, bronze medalist(s)	Daniel Pineda	Chile	7.87w	
4	José Luis Mandros	Peru	7.82w	
5	Almir dos Santos	Brazil	7.51w	
6	Santiago Cova	Venezuela	7.46w	
7	Camilo Olivares	Chile	7.41	
8	Jorge McFarlane	Peru	7.39w	
9	Eduardo Landeta	Ecuador	7.13w	
10	José Luis Duarte	Paraguay	6.50	
11	Juan Pablo Centurion	Paraguay	6.26w	

=== Triple jump ===
25 June

Rank	Name	Nationality	Result	Notes
1st place, gold medalist(s)	Miguel van Assen	Suriname	16.94	NR
2nd place, silver medalist(s)	Mateus de Sá	Brazil	16.70w	
3rd place, bronze medalist(s)	Eduardo Landeta	Ecuador	16.30w	
4	Roy Martínez	Venezuela	15.97w	
5	Maximiliano Díaz	Argentina	15.82w	
6	Divie Murillo	Colombia	15.80w	
7	Frixon Chila	Ecuador	15.73w	
8	Federico Guerrero	Argentina	15.33w	
9	Dornell Alanterie	Suriname	15.16w	
10	Jaider Paredes	Paraguay	13.78w	
11	José María Centurion	Paraguay	13.38w	
	Paulo Sérgio Oliveira	Brazil	DNS	

=== Shot put ===
24 June

Rank	Name	Nationality	Result	Notes
1st place, gold medalist(s)	Darlan Romani	Brazil	21.02	CR
2nd place, silver medalist(s)	Willian Dourado	Brazil	19.95	
3rd place, bronze medalist(s)	Germán Lauro	Argentina	19.91	
4	Jhon Fredy Zea	Colombia	18.74	
5	Eduardo Espín	Ecuador	17.59	
6	Matías López	Chile	17.38	
7	José Miguel Ballivian	Chile	16.10	
	Josnner Ortiz	Venezuela	DNS	

=== Discus throw ===
23 June

Rank	Name	Nationality	#1	#2	#3	#4	#5	#6	Result	Notes
1st place, gold medalist(s)	Mauricio Ortega	Colombia	61.90	63.42	x	61.00	x	63.82	63.82	CR, SB
2nd place, silver medalist(s)	Germán Lauro	Argentina	x	47.18	x	61.70	x	57.99	61.70	SB
3rd place, bronze medalist(s)	Douglas dos Reis	Brazil	x	57.96	57.77	x	56.65	58.83	58.83	
4	Ronald Julião	Brazil	x	44.47	51.54	x	50.20	55.89	55.89	
5	José Miguel Ballivian	Chile	48.95	49.21	54.51	52.31	51.08	53.07	54.51	
6	Juan Ignacio Solito	Argentina	51.91	53.05	44.87	50.08	51.45	50.87	53.05	
7	Eduardo Espín	Ecuador	49.62	50.92	47.10	47.68	49.21	48.47	50.92	
8	Rodrigo Cárdenas	Chile	38.59	47.87	47.62	x	43.17	42.78	47.87	
	Juan José Caicedo	Ecuador	x	x	x				NM	

=== Hammer throw ===
25 June

Rank	Name	Nationality	#1	#2	#3	#4	#5	#6	Result	Notes
1st place, gold medalist(s)	Wagner Domingos	Brazil	70.66	x	73.79	73.11	73.77	73.38	73.79	
2nd place, silver medalist(s)	Humberto Mansilla	Chile	66.90	69.73	73.16	69.10	70.62	69.23	73.16	
3rd place, bronze medalist(s)	Allan Wolski	Brazil	x	71.38	70.73	68.80	x	x	71.38	
4	Joaquín Gómez	Argentina	68.56	70.96	x	70.16	67.33	67.68	70.96	
5	Daniel Aguirre	Colombia	61.07	59.20	60.27	59.48	61.16	61.52	61.52	
6	Estalyn Rodríguez	Ecuador	56.95	x	x	x	57.79	56.10	57.79	
7	Jesús Antonio Sánchez	Paraguay	48.11	51.10	49.09	x	49.82	49.11	51.10	
8	Silvio César Ovelar	Paraguay	x	49.35	47.72	47.92	49.16	49.42	49.42	
	Fabián Serna	Colombia							DNS	

=== Javelin throw ===
24 June

Rank	Name	Nationality	#1	#2	#3	#4	#5	#6	Result	Notes
1st place, gold medalist(s)	Braian Toledo	Argentina	76.27	79.93	77.98	76.69	78.16	77.20	79.93	
2nd place, silver medalist(s)	Arley Ibargüen	Colombia	73.51	74.07	75.91	75.63	75.97	x	75.97	
3rd place, bronze medalist(s)	Víctor Fatecha	Paraguay	71.47	73.08	x	x	69.47	74.57	74.57	
4	Paulo Enrique da Silva	Brazil	65.23	64.24	67.57	68.15	69.44	73.23	73.23	
5	Giovanni Díaz	Paraguay	67.45	69.41	63.95	71.57	64.93	66.20	71.57	
6	José Escobar	Ecuador	62.73	65.37	65.62	63.05	x	x	65.62	
7	Santiago de la Fuente	Chile	x	60.11	x	61.85	x	61.22	61.85	

=== Decathlon ===
23–24 June

The highest mark recorded in each event is highlighted in yellow

Rank	Athlete	Nationality	100m	LJ	SP	HJ	400m	110m H	DT	PV	JT	1500m	Points	Notes
1st place, gold medalist(s)	Jefferson Santos	Brazil	10.77w	7.48w	13.88	2.06	49.97	14.57w	50.41	4.80	55.10	4:43.99	8187w	PB
2nd place, silver medalist(s)	Georni Jaramillo	Venezuela	10.70w	7.76w	14.46	1.79	48.99	13.96w	46.37	4.50	62.86	4:45.94	8126w	PB
3rd place, bronze medalist(s)	José Lemos	Colombia	11.09w	6.43w	16.11	1.85	50.90	14.89w	52.25	3.70	64.54	4:48.75	7572w	PB
4	Óscar Campos	Venezuela	10.89w	6.78w	12.93	1.76	49.55	14.73w	43.23	4.10	56.95	4:35.74	7394w	
5	Sergio Pandiani	Argentina	11.08w	6.73w	12.40	1.85	50.87	15.27w	37.16	3.80	50.91	4:35.82	6964w	
6	César Jofré	Chile	11.23w	6.76w	13.71	1.82	51.70	15.95w	36.74	3.70	51.52	4:53.83	6739w	
	Andy Preciado	Ecuador	10.98w	6.73w	15.48	1.97	53.27	DNS	–	–	–	–	DNF	
	Román Gastaldi	Argentina	10.98w	DNS	–	–	–	–	–	–	–	–	DNF	

== Women's results ==
=== 100 meters ===
Heats – 23 June
Wind:
Heat 1: +2.8 m/s, Heat 2: +3.5 m/s

Rank	Heat	Name	Nationality	Time	Notes
1	2	Ángela Tenorio	Ecuador	11.03	Q
2	1	Rosângela Santos	Brazil	11.08	Q
3	1	Ana Cláudia Lemos	Brazil	11.17	Q
4	1	Narcisa Landazuri	Ecuador	11.25	Q
5	2	Andrea Purica	Venezuela	11.32	Q
6	1	Nediam Vargas	Venezuela	11.48	q
7	2	María Victoria Woodward	Argentina	11.50	Q
8	1	Darlenys Obregón	Colombia	11.64	q
9	2	Viviana Olivares	Chile	11.95	
10	1	Javiera Cañas	Chile	11.99	
11	2	Gabriela Delgado	Peru	12.06	
12	2	Noelia Vera	Paraguay	12.36	
13	1	Chiara Bacigalupi	Paraguay	12.68	

Final – 23 June
Wind:
+3.4 m/s

Rank	Lane	Name	Nationality	Time	Notes
1st place, gold medalist(s)	6	Ángela Tenorio	Ecuador	11.02	
2nd place, silver medalist(s)	5	Ana Cláudia Lemos	Brazil	11.12	
3rd place, bronze medalist(s)	3	Andrea Purica	Venezuela	11.18	
4	8	Narcisa Landazuri	Ecuador	11.30	
5	1	Nediam Vargas	Venezuela	11.34	
6	7	María Victoria Woodward	Argentina	11.46	
7	2	Darlenys Obregón	Colombia	11.54	
	4	Rosângela Santos	Brazil	DQ	R162.7

=== 200 meters ===
Heats – 24 June
Wind:
Heat 1: +2.8 m/s, Heat 2: +2.6 m/s

Rank	Heat	Name	Nationality	Time	Notes
1	1	Vitória Cristina Rosa	Brazil	22.80	Q
2	1	Nediam Vargas	Venezuela	22.99	Q
3	2	Nercely Soto	Venezuela	23.17	Q
4	1	Ángela Tenorio	Ecuador	23.27	Q
5	1	Isidora Jiménez	Chile	23.35	q
6	2	Rosângela Santos	Brazil	23.39	Q
7	2	Narcisa Landazuri	Ecuador	23.41	Q
8	1	Sunayna Wahi	Suriname	23.42	q
9	2	Darlenys Obregón	Colombia	23.76	
10	1	María Victoria Woodward	Argentina	24.22	
11	2	María Fernanda Mackenna	Chile	24.48	
12	2	María Florencia Lamboglia	Argentina	24.83	
13	2	Conny Willms	Paraguay	26.94	
	1	Briza Duré	Paraguay	DNS	

Final – 25 June
Wind:
+2.8 m/s

Rank	Lane	Name	Nationality	Time	Notes
1st place, gold medalist(s)	6	Vitória Cristina Rosa	Brazil	22.67	
2nd place, silver medalist(s)	7	Ángela Tenorio	Ecuador	22.90	
3rd place, bronze medalist(s)	3	Nediam Vargas	Venezuela	22.95	
4	4	Nercely Soto	Venezuela	23.06	
5	2	Isidora Jiménez	Chile	23.37	
6	1	Sunayna Wahi	Suriname	23.43	
7	8	Narcisa Landazuri	Ecuador	23.93	
	5	Rosângela Santos	Brazil	DNS	

=== 400 meters ===
Heats – 23 June

Rank	Heat	Name	Nationality	Time	Notes
1	3	Letícia de Souza	Brazil	53.74	Q
2	2	Geisa Coutinho	Brazil	54.62	Q
3	1	Jennifer Padilla	Colombia	55.31	Q
4	1	Maitte Torres	Peru	55.59	Q
5	2	Noelia Martínez	Argentina	55.85	Q
6	3	Rosangélica Escobar	Colombia	56.02	Q
7	2	Nercely Soto	Venezuela	56.32	q
8	1	Cecilia Gómez	Bolivia	56.35	q
9	3	María Ayelén Diogo	Argentina	56.57	
10	2	María Fernanda Mackenna	Chile	56.67	
11	1	Martina Weil	Chile	57.00	
12	3	María Simancas	Venezuela	57.31	
13	1	Coraima Cortez	Ecuador	57.46	
14	2	Nicole Minota	Ecuador	57.60	
15	3	Fatima Amarilla	Paraguay	57.89	
16	3	Gabriela Delgado	Peru	58.35	
17	2	Lucia Sotomayor	Bolivia	1:01.83	
18	1	Andrea Rivas	Paraguay	1:03.17	

Final – 23 June

Rank	Lane	Name	Nationality	Time	Notes
1st place, gold medalist(s)	3	Geisa Coutinho	Brazil	52.03	
2nd place, silver medalist(s)	4	Jennifer Padilla	Colombia	52.68	
3rd place, bronze medalist(s)	8	Maitte Torres	Peru	53.99	
4	8	Noelia Martínez	Argentina	54.30	
5	1	Cecilia Gómez	Bolivia	54.37	NR
6	7	Rosangélica Escobar	Colombia	54.54	
	5	Letícia de Souza	Brazil	DNF	
	2	Nercely Soto	Venezuela	DNF	

=== 800 meters ===
25 June

Rank	Name	Nationality	Time	Notes
1st place, gold medalist(s)	Johana Arrieta	Colombia	2:06.36	
2nd place, silver medalist(s)	Andrea Calderón	Ecuador	2:07.25	
3rd place, bronze medalist(s)	Déborah Rodríguez	Uruguay	2:07.41	
4	Andrea Ferris	Panama	2:08.58	
5	Ydanis Navas	Venezuela	2:09.09	
6	Liliane dos Santos Mariano	Brazil	2:11.22	
7	Carmen Mansilla	Chile	2:12.02	
8	Carolina Lozano	Argentina	2:12.47	
9	Fatima Amarilla	Paraguay	2:14.14	
10	Mariana Borelli	Argentina	2:15.93	
11	Johana Castro	Chile	2:18.06	
	Jessica dos Santos	Brazil	DQ	R163.2(b)

=== 1500 meters ===
23 June

Rank	Name	Nationality	Time	Notes
1st place, gold medalist(s)	Muriel Coneo	Colombia	4:16.46	
2nd place, silver medalist(s)	Rosibel García	Colombia	4:21.81	SB
3rd place, bronze medalist(s)	Zulema Arenas	Peru	4:23.37	
4	María Pía Fernández	Uruguay	4:23.50	
5	Carolina Lozano	Argentina	4:24.75	
6	Soledad Torre	Peru	4:31.56	
7	Mary Granja	Ecuador	4:32.92	
8	Javiera Faletto	Chile	4:42.55	
9	Irma Vila	Bolivia	4:44.97	

=== 5000 meters ===
25 June

Rank	Name	Nationality	Time	Notes
1st place, gold medalist(s)	Muriel Coneo	Colombia	16:16.64	
2nd place, silver medalist(s)	Belén Casetta	Argentina	16:26.32	
3rd place, bronze medalist(s)	Ángela Figueroa	Colombia	16:30.59	
4	Luz Mery Rojas	Peru	16:35.20	
5	Carmen Martínez	Paraguay	16:35.46	
6	Jessica Paguay	Ecuador	16:50.50	
7	Salomé Mendoza	Bolivia	16:52.47	
8	Soledad Torre	Peru	16:55.90	
9	Mary Granja	Ecuador	16:58.07	
10	Irma Vila	Bolivia	17:17.09	
	María Caballero	Paraguay	DNF	
	Florencia Borelli	Argentina	DNF	
	Jennifer González	Chile	DNF	

=== 10,000 meters ===
23 June

Rank	Name	Nationality	Time	Notes
1st place, gold medalist(s)	Carmen Martínez	Paraguay	34:08.28	SB
2nd place, silver medalist(s)	Clara Canchanya	Peru	35:01.47	PB
3rd place, bronze medalist(s)	Jovana de la Cruz	Peru	35:06.24	
4	Ángela Figueroa	Colombia	35:10.29	
5	Jessica Paguay	Ecuador	35:12.38	
6	Diana Landi	Ecuador	35:20.00	
7	Rosa Godoy	Argentina	35:45.46	
8	Salomé Mendoza	Bolivia	35:58.59	
9	Claudia Cornejo	Bolivia	36:03.76	
	Fátima Romero	Paraguay	DNF	
	Jennifer González	Chile	DNF	

=== 100 meters hurdles ===
23 June
Wind: +2.9 m/s

Rank	Lane	Name	Nationality	Time	Notes
1st place, gold medalist(s)	2	Fabiana Moraes	Brazil	12.86	
2nd place, silver medalist(s)	6	Génesis Romero	Venezuela	13.16	
3rd place, bronze medalist(s)	4	Melissa Gonzalez	Colombia	13.42	
4	7	Janea McCammon	Guyana	13.49	
5	8	María Ignacia Eguiguren	Chile	13.49	
6	3	Diana Bazalar	Peru	13.61	
7	1	Juliana Angulo	Ecuador	13.82	
	5	Rocio Chaparro	Paraguay	DQ	R168.7b

=== 400 meters hurdles ===
Heats – 24 June

Rank	Heat	Name	Nationality	Time	Notes
1	2	Gianna Woodruff	Panama	58.32	Q
2	2	Melissa Gonzalez	Colombia	58.63	Q
3	2	Jailma de Lima	Brazil	59.29	Q
4	1	Fiorella Chiappe	Argentina	59.66	Q
5	1	María José Echeverría	Chile	1:00.14	Q
6	2	Marina Poroso	Ecuador	1:00.86	q
7	1	Janea McCammon	Guyana	1:01.34	Q
8	1	Fatima Amarilla	Paraguay	1:01.89	q, NR
9	2	Valeria Baron	Argentina	1:02.86	
10	1	Cecilia Gómez	Bolivia	1:03.70	
11	1	Virginia Villalba	Ecuador	1:04.27	

Final – 24 June

Rank	Lane	Name	Nationality	Time	Notes
1st place, gold medalist(s)	3	Gianna Woodruff	Panama	56.04	CR
2nd place, silver medalist(s)	4	Melissa Gonzalez	Colombia	56.29	
3rd place, bronze medalist(s)	5	Fiorella Chiappe	Argentina	57.02	
4	8	Jailma de Lima	Brazil	57.98	
5	7	Janea McCammon	Guyana	59.38	
6	6	María José Echeverría	Chile	1:00.16	
7	2	Marina Poroso	Ecuador	1:01.84	
8	1	Fatima Amarilla	Paraguay	1:03.62	

=== 3000 meters steeplechase ===
24 June

Rank	Name	Nationality	Time	Notes
1st place, gold medalist(s)	Belén Casetta	Argentina	9:51.40	
2nd place, silver medalist(s)	Zulema Arenas	Peru	10:09.20	
3rd place, bronze medalist(s)	Tatiane Raquel da Silva	Brazil	10:34.23	

=== 4 × 100 meters relay ===
24 July

Rank	Heat	Nation	Competitors	Time	Notes
1st place, gold medalist(s)	2	Brazil	Franciela Krasucki, Ana Cláudia Lemos, Vitória Cristina Rosa, Rosângela Santos	43.12	CR
2nd place, silver medalist(s)	2	Colombia	Maderleis Alcazar, Jennifer Padilla, Darlenys Obregón, Eliecith Palacios	44.50	
3rd place, bronze medalist(s)	2	Ecuador	Juliana Angulo, Narcisa Landazuri, Romina Cifuentes, Ángela Tenorio	44.53	
4	1	Chile	Macarena Borie, Martina Weil, Viviana Olivares, Javiera Cañas	46.02	
5	2	Argentina	María Ayelén Diogo, Noelia Martínez, María Florencia Lamboglia, María Victoria Woodward	46.14	
6	1	Peru	Paola Mautino, Maitte Torres, Diana Bazalar, Gabriela Delgado	46.43	
7	1	Bolivia	Carla Cavero, Cecilia Gómez, Lucia Sotomayor, Valeria Quispe	48.75	
	1	Paraguay	Noelia Vera, Chiara Bacigalupi, Conny Willms, Xenia Hiebert	DQ	R170.7
	2	Venezuela	Génesis Romero, Andrea Purica, Nediam Vargas, Nercely Soto	DNF	

=== 4 × 400 meters relay ===
25 July

Rank	Nation	Competitors	Time	Notes
1st place, gold medalist(s)	Brazil	Jailma de Lima, Jéssica da Silva, Jéssica dos Santos, Geisa Coutinho	3:33.00	
2nd place, silver medalist(s)	Colombia	Eliana Chávez, Rosangélica Escobar, Astrid Balanta, Jennifer Padilla	3:33.92	
3rd place, bronze medalist(s)	Chile	Martina Weil, Carmen Mansilla, María Fernanda Mackenna, María José Echeverría	3:40.00	
4	Argentina	Fiorella Chiappe, Valeria Baron, María Ayelén Diogo, Noelia Martínez	3:40.56	
5	Ecuador	Coraima Cortez, Marina Poroso, Virginia Villalba, Nicole Minota	3:44.92	
6	Paraguay	Liz González, Andrea Rivas, Conny Willms, Fatima Amarilla	4:09.14	
	Venezuela		DNS	

=== 20,000 meters walk ===
24 June

Rank	Name	Nationality	Time	Notes
1st place, gold medalist(s)	Paola Pérez	Ecuador	1:32:26.0	NR, WL
2nd place, silver medalist(s)	Ángela Castro	Bolivia	1:32:35.2	
3rd place, bronze medalist(s)	Johana Ordóñez	Ecuador	1:38:13.3	
4	Odeth Huanca	Bolivia	1:41:27.0	
5	Milangela Rosales	Venezuela	1:43:34.3	
	Arabelly Orjuela	Colombia	DQ	R230.7
	Yossy Caballero	Peru	DQ	R230.7

=== High jump ===
25 June

Rank	Name	Nationality	1.60	1.65	1.70	1.73	1.76	1.79	1.82	1.85	Result	Notes
1st place, gold medalist(s)	María Fernanda Murillo	Colombia	–	–	o	o	o	o	o	xxx	1.82	
2nd place, silver medalist(s)	Lorena Aires	Uruguay	–	–	o	o	xxo	o	xo	xxx	1.82	NR
3rd place, bronze medalist(s)	Julia dos Santos	Brazil	–	o	o	o	xxo	xxo	xxx		1.79	
4	Daniela Oliveros	Colombia	o	o	o	o	xxx				1.73	

=== Pole vault ===
23 June

Rank	Name	Nationality	3.40	3.60	3.70	3.80	3.90	4.00	4.05	4.10	4.15	4.20	4.25	4.30	4.50	Result	Notes
1st place, gold medalist(s)	Robeilys Peinado	Venezuela														4.50	
2nd place, silver medalist(s)	Joana Costa	Brazil	–	–	–	–	o	o	–	xo	–	o	xx			4.20	
3rd place, bronze medalist(s)	Valeria Chiaraviglio	Argentina	–	–	–	o	–	xxo	xo	xxo	o	x–	xx			4.15	SB
4	Carmen Villanueva	Venezuela														4.00	
5	Karla Rosa da Silva	Brazil	–	–	–	–	o	–	–	xxx						3.90	
6	Catalina Amarilla	Paraguay	xo	o	xxo	xxx										3.70	
7	Ana Gabriela Quiñonez	Ecuador	–	o	–	xxx										3.60	
	Noelina Madarieta	Argentina														DNS	

=== Long jump ===
24 June

Rank	Name	Nationality	Result	Notes
1st place, gold medalist(s)	Eliane Martins	Brazil	6.51w	
2nd place, silver medalist(s)	Macarena Reyes	Chile	6.51w	
3rd place, bronze medalist(s)	Jhoanmy Luque	Venezuela	6.47w	
4	Jéssica Carolina dos Reis	Brazil	6.43w	
5	Paola Mautino	Peru	6.31w	
6	Macarena Borie	Chile	6.14w	
7	Carla Cavero	Bolivia	5.86w	
8	Sánchez Aires	Venezuela	5.83w	
9	Valeria Quispe	Bolivia	5.68	
10	Lizel Gómez	Paraguay	5.31w	
11	Chiara Bacigalupi	Paraguay	5.00w	

=== Triple jump ===
23 June

Rank	Name	Nationality	Result	Notes
1st place, gold medalist(s)	Núbia Soares	Brazil	14.42w	
2nd place, silver medalist(s)	Yulimar Rojas	Venezuela	14.36	
3rd place, bronze medalist(s)	Yosiris Urrutia	Colombia	13.64w	
4	Jhoanmy Luque	Venezuela	13.62w	
5	Miriam Reyes	Peru	13.04w	
6	Giselly Landázury	Colombia	13.00w	
7	Silvana Segura	Peru	12.89w	
8	Valeria Quispe	Bolivia	12.61w	
9	Lizel Gómez	Paraguay	12.07w	

=== Shot put ===
25 June

Rank	Name	Nationality	#1	#2	#3	#4	#5	#6	Result	Notes
1st place, gold medalist(s)	Geisa Arcanjo	Brazil	x	18.06	17.07	17.00	17.00	–	18.06	
2nd place, silver medalist(s)	Sandra Lemos	Colombia							17.30	
3rd place, bronze medalist(s)	Livia Avancini	Brazil	15.70	16.75	16.06	x	x	16.25	16.75	
4	Rocío Comba	Argentina	13.69	13.10	14.01	13.89	13.61	13.23	14.01	
5	Ana Camila Pirelli	Paraguay	13.55	13.46	13.05	13.89	13.03	13.37	13.89	
6	Ailen Armada	Argentina	13.72	x	12.43	13.17	13.62	13.79	13.79	
7	Ginger Quintero	Ecuador	13.44	13.62	13.77	13.47	13.57	12.72	13.77	

=== Discus throw ===
23 June

Rank	Name	Nationality	#1	#2	#3	#4	#5	#6	Result	Notes
1st place, gold medalist(s)	Andressa de Morais	Brazil	61.27	63.82	61.88	64.68	x	x	64.68	CR, AR
2nd place, silver medalist(s)	Fernanda Martins	Brazil	x	59.27	x	60.45	58.82	60.80	60.80	
3rd place, bronze medalist(s)	Karen Gallardo	Chile	52.41	58.10	59.41	55.41	x	59.73	59.73	
4	Rocío Comba	Argentina	x	56.14	52.31	53.84	x	x	56.14	
5	Ailen Armada	Argentina	x	45.57	53.60	52.80	x	x	53.60	

=== Hammer throw ===
24 June

Rank	Name	Nationality	#1	#2	#3	#4	#5	#6	Result	Notes
1st place, gold medalist(s)	Mariana Marcelino	Brazil	66.83	x	66.08	x	x	x	66.83	
2nd place, silver medalist(s)	Jennifer Dahlgren	Argentina	62.20	66.15	66.17	61.92	65.24	x	66.17	
3rd place, bronze medalist(s)	Johana Moreno	Colombia	x	58.89	61.33	60.93	63.09	61.05	63.09	
4	Mayra Gaviria	Colombia	x	59.26	61.21	58.16	59.33	56.79	61.21	
5	Valeria Chiliquinga	Ecuador	55.80	58.07	58.02	58.98	x	58.24	58.98	
6	Mariana García	Chile	55.24	55.72	55.85	54.93	55.86	56.85	56.85	
7	Paola Miranda	Paraguay	49.50	x	52.90	x	53.56	56.06	56.06	
8	Noelia Cáceres	Paraguay	48.22	50.09	49.04	50.22	50.34	48.83	50.34	
	Rosa Rodríguez	Venezuela							DNS	

=== Javelin throw ===
23 June

Rank	Name	Nationality	#1	#2	#3	#4	#5	#6	Result	Notes
1st place, gold medalist(s)	Flor Ruiz	Colombia	61.31	61.91					61.91	CR
2nd place, silver medalist(s)	Laila Domingos	Brazil	57.31	54.83					58.50	
3rd place, bronze medalist(s)	Laura Paredes	Paraguay	x	46.47					54.86	PB
4	Daniella Lorenzon	Brazil	52.88	x					52.88	
5	Estefani Chacón	Venezuela	50.61	49.28					52.55	
6	María Paz Ríos	Chile	50.22	49.11	47.34				50.22	
7	Bárbara López	Argentina	47.84	47.52					47.84	
8	Valentina Salazar	Chile	42.40	x	41.72				42.40	
	Juleisy Angulo	Ecuador	50.38	x	x				50.38	

=== Heptathlon ===
24–25 June

The highest mark recorded in each event is highlighted in yellow

Rank	Athlete	Nationality	100m H	HJ	SP	200m	LJ	JT	800m	Points	Notes
1st place, gold medalist(s)	Tamara de Sousa	Brazil	14.34w	1.76	14.70	24.56	5.65w	40.34	2:35.91	5667w	
2nd place, silver medalist(s)	Javiera Brahm	Chile	14.39w	1.61	11.83	25.15	5.78w	29.51	2:27.51	5168w	
3rd place, bronze medalist(s)	Martina Corra	Argentina	14.30w	1.61	11.48	25.56	5.22w	38.39	2:35.61	5026w	
4	Kimberly de Mederos	Uruguay	15.36w	1.61	8.95	25.60	5.75w	34.88	2:26.56	4916w	
5	Jennifer Canchingre	Ecuador	15.22w	1.52	11.56	26.94	5.25w	36.95	DNF	4043w	
