= Martín Correa =

Uruguayan footballer (born 2000)

Personal information
- Full name: Elcio Martín Correa Rodríguez
- Date of birth: 4 June 2000 (age 26)
- Place of birth: Rivera, Uruguay
- Height: 1.87 m (6 ft 2 in)
- Position: Goalkeeper

Youth career
- 2014–2020: Peñarol

Senior career*
Years	Team	Apps	(Gls)
2020–2022	Peñarol	1	(0)
2022	→ Miramar Misiones (loan)	2	(0)
- * Club domestic league appearances and goals as of 1 January 2023

Elcio Martín Correa Rodríguez (born 4 June 2000) is a Uruguayan professional footballer who plays as a goalkeeper.

== Career ==
=== Peñarol ===
Correa joined the Peñarol first team in January 2020 after a six year spell in the club's youth system. He made his debut for the club in February of that year in a 2-1 victory over Cerro.

== Career statistics ==
=== Club ===
As of match played 14 April 2021

Appearances and goals by club, season and competition
Club	Season	League			Cup		Continental		Other		Total	
Club	Season	Division	Apps	Goals	Apps	Goals	Apps	Goals	Apps	Goals	Apps	Goals
Peñarol	2020	Uruguayan Primera División	1	0	—	—	—	—	—	—	1	0
Peñarol	2021	Uruguayan Primera División	0	0	—	—	0	0	—	—	0	0
Career total			1	0	—	—	0	0	—	—	1	0
