= 2009 South American Junior Championships in Athletics =

XXXVIII South American Junior Championships in Athletics
- Dates: July 25–26; July 31-August 2
- Host city: São Paulo, Brazil; Port of Spain, Trinidad and Tobago
- Venue: Estádio Ícaro de Castro Melo; Hasely Crawford Stadium
- Level: Junior
- Events: 44
- Participation: about 212 athletes from 12 nations

The 38th South American Junior Championships in Athletics (Campeonatos Sudamericanos de Atletismo de Juveniles) were held in São Paulo, Brazil in the Estádio Ícaro de Castro Melo from July 25–26, 2009. The Champions for men’s 10,000m, both Race Walking and Combined Events were extracted from the classification of the 2009 Pan American Junior Championships held in Port of Spain, Trinidad and Tobago in the Hasely Crawford Stadium from July 31 to August 2, 2009. A detailed report on the results was given.

== Participation (unofficial) ==
Detailed result lists can be found on the "World Junior Athletics History" website. An unofficial count yields the number of about 212 athletes from about 12 countries: Argentina (30), Bolivia (6), Brazil (75), Chile (27), Colombia (21), Ecuador (10), Panama (6), Paraguay (2), Peru (10), Suriname (2), Uruguay (3), Venezuela (20).

== Medal summary ==
Medal winners are published. Complete results can be found on the CBAt website, and on the "World Junior Athletics History" website.

=== Men ===
Event	Gold		Silver		Bronze	
100 metres (0.4 m/s)	Eric de Jesús (BRA)	10.45	Diego Cavalcanti (BRA)	10.46	Isidro Montoya (COL)	10.63
200 metres (-0.3 m/s)	Diego Cavalcanti (BRA)	20.89	Renato de Oliveira (BRA)	21.48	Arturo Ramírez (VEN)	21.66
400 metres	Hederson Estefani (BRA)	46.20 CR	Omar Longart (VEN)	47.32	Jonathan da Silva (BRA)	47.32
800 metres	Franco Díaz (ARG)	1:52.04	Tomás Squella (CHI)	1:52.93	Julio Alfonso Pérez (PER)	1:53.34
1500 metres	Iván López (CHI)	3:56.33	Franco Díaz (ARG)	3:57.51	Lucirio Antonio Garrido (VEN)	4:00.43
5000 metres	Iván López (CHI)	14:39.95	Wily Canchanya (PER)	14:42.45	Victor Aravena (CHI)	14:45.97
10000 metres	Victor Aravena (CHI)	31:01.70	Ederson Pereira (BRA)	31:20.38	Paulo Carvalho (BRA)	32:18.08
3000 metres steeplechase	Jean Machado (BRA)	9:26.03	Daniel Estrada (CHI)	9:26.36	Derlis Ayala (PAR)	9:26.44
110 metres hurdles (1.2 m/s)	Valmir Macedo (BRA)	14.01	Robin Mosquera (COL)	14.03	Nelson Acebey (BOL)	14.23
400 metres hurdles	Hederson Estefani (BRA)	51.07 CR	Alexandre Silva (BRA)	52.44	Brayan Ambuila (COL)	52.51
High jump	Carlos Layoy (ARG)	2.14	Arturo Chávez (PER)	2.09	Simon Villa (COL)	2.03
Pole vault	Augusto de Oliveira (BRA)	4.90	Heberth Gómez (COL)	4.65	Thiago Braz da Silva (BRA)	4.40
Long jump	Jamal Bowen (PAN)	7.78 (-0.5 m/s)	Lourival Neto (BRA)	7.58 (0.9 m/s)	Willian Barrionuevo (BRA)	7.45 (0.9 m/s)
Triple jump	Jean Rosa (BRA)	15.78 (0.8 m/s)	Robin Mosquera (COL)	15.74 (0.7 m/s)	José Adrian Sornoza (ECU)	15.49 (-0.6 m/s)
Shot put	Matías López (CHI)	18.06	Darlan Romani (BRA)	16.99	Joaquín José Ballivian (CHI)	16.09
Discus throw	Raílson da Cruz (BRA)	51.67	Matías López (CHI)	50.86	Leonardo Ullúa (ARG)	50.18
Hammer throw	Allan Wolski (BRA)	64.98	Pedro da Costa (BRA)	59.74	Jaime Díaz (CHI)	55.74
Javelin throw	Lucas da Silva (BRA)	70.27	Braian Toledo (ARG)	69.63	Tomás Guerra (CHI)	64.70
Decathlon	Eduardo Alexandrino (BRA)	6734	José Lemos (COL)	6517	Marcos Rocha (BRA)	6380
10000 metres Walk	Caio Bonfim (BRA)	42:43.58	José Leonardo Montaña (COL)	43:06.27	Jhon Castañeda (COL)	43:58.80
4 x 100 metres relay	Brazil; Gustavo dos Santos; Eric de Jesús; Diego Cavalcanti; Jefferson Lucindo	39.87	Colombia; Robin Mosquera; Roberto Murillo; Brayan Ambuila; Isidro Montoya	41.26	Venezuela; Jhony Camacho; Arturo Ramírez; Juan Jiménez; Diego Rivas	41.49
4 x 400 metres relay	Brazil; Jonathan da Silva; Lucas Oliveira; José de Oliveira; Hederson Estefani	3:10.66	Venezuela; Lucirio Antonio Garrido; Carlos Barcenas; José Colina; Omar Longart	3:17.83	Argentina; Lucas Semino; Alexis Tello; Franco Díaz; Andrés Mendoza	3:19.71

=== Women ===
Event	Gold		Silver		Bronze	
100 metres (1.0 m/s)	Erika Chávez (ECU)	11.83	Vanusa dos Santos (BRA)	11.85	Nelcy Caicedo (COL)	11.86
200 metres (0.2 m/s)	Bárbara Leôncio (BRA)	23.81	Erika Chávez (ECU)	23.85	Jennifer Padilla (COL)	24.28
400 metres	Bárbara de Oliveira (BRA)	53.44 CR	Jennifer Padilla (COL)	54.17	Aline Pinto (BRA)	54.19
800 metres	Thayra dos Santos (BRA)	2:11.29	Jessica dos Santos (BRA)	2:13.03	Rosa Escobar (COL)	2:13.73
1500 metres	Tatiana Araújo (BRA)	4:37.36	Bruna Rocha (BRA)	4:38.04	Evangelina Thomas (ARG)	4:43.86
3000 metres	Viviana Acosta (ECU)	10:10.99	Yoni Ninahuaman (PER)	10:11.75	Dina Cid (CHI)	10:13.51
5000 metres	Viviana Acosta (ECU)	17:09.60	Inga Charo (PER)	17:15.00	Dina Cid (CHI)	17:24.58
3000 metres steeplechase	Florencia Borelli (ARG)	10:50.07 NR-j	Yoni Ninahuaman (PER)	10:55.44	Tatiane da Silva (BRA)	11:31.94
100 metres hurdles (-1.5 m/s)	Leticia Gaspar (BRA)	14.52	Evelyn da Silva (BRA)	14.62	Cecilia Rivera (CHI)	14.66
400 metres hurdles	Déborah Rodríguez (URU)	59.97	Estefanny Balladares (VEN)	61.55	Natania Habitxreiter (BRA)	61.71
High jump	Sara Muñoz (COL)	1.76	Betsabée Páez (ARG)	1.73	Florencia Vergara (CHI)	1.70
Pole vault	Sara Pereira (BRA)	3.85	Claudia Vitória (BRA)	3.40	Estefanía Furnier (ARG)	3.40
Long jump	Carla Novais (BRA)	5.96 (-0.2 m/s)	Maria Dittborn (CHI)	5.89 (0.6 m/s)	Leticia Gaspar (BRA)	5.77 (-0.2 m/s)
Triple jump	Bianca dos Santos (BRA)	12.42 (-0.2 m/s)	Martha Ocoro (COL)	12.40 (0.0 m/s)	Aline do Nascimento (BRA)	12.33 (0.0 m/s)
Shot put	Geisa Arcanjo (BRA)	15.30	Renata Severiano (BRA)	14.83	Alessandra Gamboa (PER)	13.39
Discus throw	Andressa de Morais (BRA)	55.27 CR NR-j	Geisa Arcanjo (BRA)	48.18	Julia Nuñez (ARG)	31.86
Hammer throw	Andressa de Morais (BRA)	55.26	Zuleima Mina (ECU)	53.57	Julia Nuñez (ARG)	50.37
Javelin throw	María Lucelly Murillo (COL)	50.08 CR	Jucilene de Lima (BRA)	48.74	Rafaela Gonçalves (BRA)	47.42
Heptathlon	Vanessa Spínola (BRA)	5574 CR	Cynthia Alves (BRA)	5164	Carolina Castillo (CHI)	4531
10000 metres Walk	Maria Rayo (COL)	50:23.6	Anlly Pineda (COL)	50:36.4	Mayara Vicentainer (BRA)	59:09.0
4 x 100 metres relay	Brazil; Vanessa Spínola; Ana da Conceição; Lorena Lourenço; Vanusa dos Santos	45.86	Colombia; Kelly Lucumí; Jennifer Padilla; Yenifer Rivas; Nelcy Caicedo	46.48	Chile; Carolina Castillo; María Dittborn; Cecilia Rivera; María Ignacia Eguiguren	47.48
4 x 400 metres relay	Brazil; Natalia da Silva; Jessica dos Santos; Bárbara Leôncio; Bárbara de Oliveira	3:42.20	Colombia; Nelcy Caicedo; Rosa Escobar; Yenifer Rivas; Kelly Lucumí	3:51.84	Argentina; Maria Ayelen Diogo; Jesica Torres; María Florencia Lamboglia; Juliana Menéndez	3:52.55

== Medal table (unofficial) ==
The medal count was published.

* Host nation (Brazil)

Rank	Nation	Gold	Silver	Bronze	Total
1	Brazil*	29	16	12	57
2	Chile	4	4	10	18
3	Colombia	3	11	7	21
4	Argentina	3	3	7	13
5	Ecuador	3	2	1	6
6	Panama	1	0	0	1
6	Uruguay	1	0	0	1
8	Peru	0	5	2	7
9	Venezuela	0	3	3	6
10	Bolivia	0	0	1	1
10	Paraguay	0	0	1	1
Totals (11 entries)		44	44	44	132

== Team trophies ==
The placing tables for team trophy(overall team, men and women categories) were published.

=== Total ===
The host country is highlighted in lavender blue

Rank	Nation	Points
1st place, gold medalist(s)	Brazil	563
2nd place, silver medalist(s)	Colombia	169
3rd place, bronze medalist(s)	Chile	150
4	Argentina	118
5	Venezuela	76
6	Ecuador	61
7	Peru	49
8	Bolivia	18
9	Panama	14
10	Uruguay	13
11	Paraguay	5
12	Suriname	2

=== Male ===
The host country is highlighted in lavender blue

Rank	Nation	Points
1st place, gold medalist(s)	Brazil	278
2nd place, silver medalist(s)	Chile	95
3rd place, bronze medalist(s)	Colombia	73
4	Argentina	62
5	Venezuela	47
6	Peru	23
7	Ecuador	17
8	Bolivia	12
9	Panama	10
10	Paraguay	5
11	Uruguay	3

=== Female ===
The host country is highlighted in lavender blue

Rank	Nation	Points
1st place, gold medalist(s)	Brazil	285
2nd place, silver medalist(s)	Colombia	96
3rd place, bronze medalist(s)	Argentina	56
4	Chile	55
5	Ecuador	44
6	Venezuela	29
7	Peru	26
8	Uruguay	10
9	Bolivia	6
10	Panama	4
11	Suriname	2
