= Bárbara Leôncio =

Brazilian sprinter (born 1991)

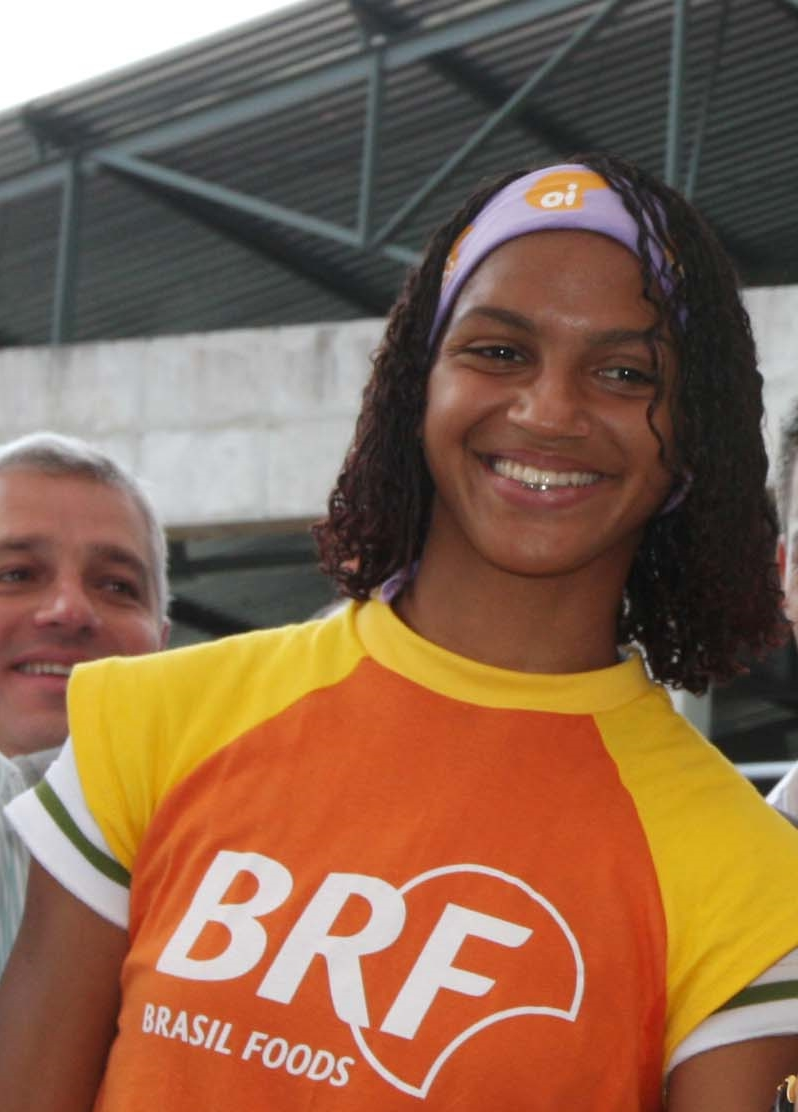
- Leôncio in 2010

Personal information
- Full name: Bárbara da Silva Leôncio
- Nationality: Brazilian
- Born: October 7, 1991 (age 34) Rio de Janeiro, Brazil

Sport
- Sport: Running
- Event: Sprints
Medal record
Women's athletics
Representing Brazil
South American Games
Silver medal – second place	2010 Medellín	4×400 m relay
Bronze medal – third place	2010 Medellín	200 m
Ibero-American Championships
Gold medal – first place	2010 San Fernando	4×100 m relay
Pan American Junior Championships
Silver medal – second place	2007 São Paulo	4×100 m relay
Bronze medal – third place	2005 Windsor	4×100 m relay
South American Junior Championships
Gold medal – first place	2007 São Paulo	200 m
Gold medal – first place	2007 São Paulo	4×100 m relay
Gold medal – first place	2009 São Paulo	200 m
Gold medal – first place	2009 São Paulo	4×400 m relay
Silver medal – second place	2007 São Paulo	100 m
World Youth Championships
Gold medal – first place	2007 Ostrava	200 m
South American Youth Championships
Gold medal – first place	2006 Caracas	100 m
Gold medal – first place	2006 Caracas	200 m
Gold medal – first place	2006 Caracas	4×100 m relay
Gold medal – first place	2006 Caracas	Medley relay
Gold medal – first place	2008 Lima	100 m
Gold medal – first place	2008 Lima	200 m
Gold medal – first place	2008 Lima	Medley relay

Bárbara Leôncio (born October 7, 1991) is a Brazilian athlete, world champion in the 200 meters at the 2007 World Youth Championships in Athletics held in Ostrava, Czech Republic. In the same edition, Bárbara was placed fourth in the 100 meters. In the following year, she placed 13th in the semifinals of the 100 meters at the 2008 World Junior Championships in Athletics, held in Bydgoszcz, Poland.

== Achievements ==
Year	Competition	Venue	Position	Event	Notes
Representing Brazil
2006	South American Youth Championships	Caracas, Venezuela	1st	100 m	11.82 s
2006	South American Youth Championships	Caracas, Venezuela	1st	200 m	24.26 s
2006	South American Youth Championships	Caracas, Venezuela	1st	4 × 100 m relay	46.20 s
2006	South American Youth Championships	Caracas, Venezuela	1st	1000 m medley relay	2:12.03 min
2007	World Youth Championships	Ostrava, Czech Republic	1st	200 m	23.50 s
2008	World Junior Championships	Bydgoszcz, Poland	15th (sf)	100m	11.76 (wind: -0.7 m/s)
2008	World Junior Championships	Bydgoszcz, Poland	3rd	4 × 100 m relay	44.61
2008	South American Youth Championships	Lima, Peru	1st	100 m	11.93 s
2008	South American Youth Championships	Lima, Peru	1st	200 m	24.03 s (wind: -0.1 m/s)
2008	South American Youth Championships	Lima, Peru	1st	1000 m medley relay	2:12.47
2010	Ibero-American Championships	San Fernando, Spain	1st	4 × 100 m relay	43.97 s
2010	World Junior Championships	Moncton, New Brunswick, Canada	9th (sf)	100m	11.78 (wind: +1.6 m/s)
2010	World Junior Championships	Moncton, New Brunswick, Canada	10th (sf)	200m	23.86 (wind: +1.3 m/s)
