= Omar Longart =

Venezuelan sprinter (born 1991)

Personal information
- Full name: Omar José Longart Rondón
- Nationality: Venezuela
- Born: 18 May 1991 (age 35) El Tigre, Anzoátegui, Venezuela
- Height: 1.72 m (5 ft 8 in)
- Weight: 69 kg (152 lb)

Sport
- Sport: Athletics
- Updated on 23 June 2013

Omar Longart (born 18 May 1991) is a Venezuelan sprinter.

== Career ==
He competed in the 4 × 400 m relay event at the 2012 Summer Olympics and the 2016 Summer Olympics.

== Personal bests ==
- 400 m: 46.09 s A – Medellín, Colombia, 20 March 2010

== Achievements ==
| Year | Competition | Venue | Position | Event | Notes |
Representing Venezuela
| 2008 | South American Youth Championships | Lima, Peru | 1st | 400 m | 47.95 s |
| 2008 | South American Youth Championships | Lima, Peru | 2nd | 1000 m medley relay | 1:56.08 min |
| 2009 | ALBA Games | Havana, Cuba | 2nd | 4 × 400 m relay | 3:10.04 min |
| 2009 | Central American and Caribbean Championships | Havana, Cuba | 8th | 4 × 400 m relay | 3:09.61 min |
| 2009 | South American Junior Championships | São Paulo, Brazil | 2nd | 400 m | 47.32 s |
| 2009 | South American Junior Championships | São Paulo, Brazil | 2nd | 4 × 400 m relay | 3:17.83 min |
| 2009 | Pan American Junior Championships | Port of Spain, Trinidad and Tobago | 5th (h) | 200 m | 21.97 s (wind: +0.3 m/s) |
| 2009 | Pan American Junior Championships | Port of Spain, Trinidad and Tobago | 4th (h) | 400 m | 47.87 s |
| 2009 | Bolivarian Games | Sucre, Bolivia | 2nd | 400 m | 46.74 s A |
| 2009 | Bolivarian Games | Sucre, Bolivia | 1st | 4 × 400 m relay | 3:06.91 min A |
| 2010 | Ibero-American Championships | San Fernando, Spain | 7th | 400 m | 47.02 s |
| 2010 | Ibero-American Championships | San Fernando, Spain | 3rd | 4 × 400 m relay | 3:05.53 min |
| 2010 | Central American and Caribbean; Junior Championships (U-20) | Santo Domingo, Dominican Republic | 1st | 400 m | 46.75 s |
| 2010 | Central American and Caribbean Games | Mayagüez, Puerto Rico | 6th | 4 × 400 m relay | 3:07.98 min |
| 2010 | World Junior Championships | Moncton, Canada | 12th (sf) | 400 m | 47.25 s |
| 2011 | Central American and Caribbean Championships | Mayagüez, Puerto Rico | 5th (h) | 400 m | 47.61 s |
| 2011 | Central American and Caribbean Championships | Mayagüez, Puerto Rico | 6th | 4 × 400 m relay | 3:04.93 min |
| 2011 | ALBA Games | Barquisimeto, Venezuela | 3rd | 400 m | 46.33 s |
| 2011 | ALBA Games | Barquisimeto, Venezuela | 1st | 4 × 400 m relay | 3:04.83 min |
| 2011 | Pan American Games | Guadalajara, Mexico | 5th (h) | 400 m | 46.50 s A |
| 2011 | Pan American Games | Guadalajara, Mexico | 3rd | 4 × 400 m relay | 3:00.82 min A NR |
| 2012 | World Indoor Championships | Istanbul, Turkey | 3rd (h) | 4 × 400 m relay | 3:11.11 min |
| 2012 | Ibero-American Championships | Barquisimeto, Venezuela | 2nd | 4 × 400 m relay | 3:01.70 min |
| 2012 | Olympic Games | London, United Kingdom | 7th | 4 × 400 m relay | 3:02.18 min |
| 2015 | IAAF World Relays | Nassau, Bahamas | 13th (h) | 4 × 200 m relay | 3:06.15 |
| 2016 | Ibero-American Championships | Rio de Janeiro, Brazil | 3rd | 4 × 400 m relay | 3:03.61 |
| 2016 | Olympic Games | Rio de Janeiro, Brazil | 12th (h) | 4 × 400 m relay | 3:02.69 min |
| 2017 | IAAF World Relays | Nassau, Bahamas | 11th (h) | 4 × 200 m relay | 1:25.69 |
| 2017 | South American Championships | Asunción, Paraguay | 3rd | 4 × 400 m relay | 3:07.74 |
| 2017 | Bolivarian Games | Santa Marta, Colombia | 2nd | 4 × 400 m relay | 3:06.32 |
| 2018 | Central American and Caribbean Games | Barranquilla, Colombia | 4th | 4 × 400 m relay | 3:06.62 |
| 2019 | Pan American Games | Lima, Peru | 8th | 4 × 400 m relay | 3:10.65 |
