= Athletics at the 2010 South American Games =

Athletics at the 9th South American Games
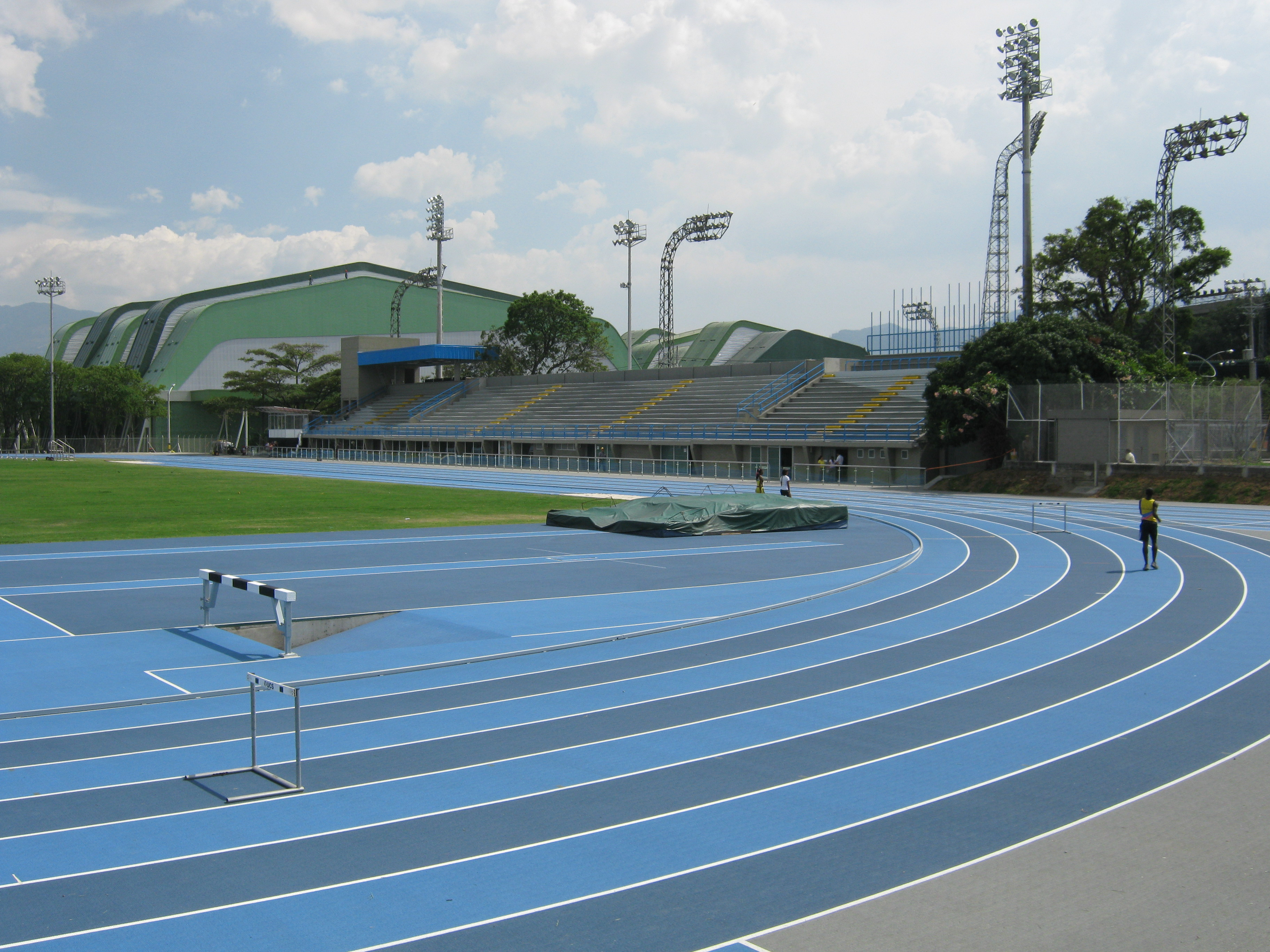
- Athletics stadium at the Atanasio Girardot sports complex in Medellín, Colombia.
- Dates: March 20 – March 23
- Host city: Medellín, Colombia
- Venue: Alfonso Galvis Duque Stadium
- Level: U23
- Events: 42
- Participation: 13 nations

The athletics events at the 2010 South American Games (Spanish: IX Juegos Suramericanos) were held from March 20–23 at the Alfonso Galvis Duque Stadium in Medellín, Colombia. The competition also acted at the 4th South American Under-23 Championships. A total of 42 events were contested, 21 by male athletes and 21 by female athletes. The stadium was 1541 metres above sea level, thus some athletes' performances benefited from altitude assistance.

Brazil topped the medal table with 13 golds and 41 medals overall. Hosts Colombia were the next most successful (11 golds and 35 total) while Venezuela and Peru took third and fourth place respectively. Ana Cláudia Lemos Silva provided one of the highlights of the competition, equalling the South American record in the women's 100 metres with a run of 11.17 seconds. Jorge McFarlane of Peru took victory in both the 110 metres hurdles and the long jump, setting championships and Games records in both events, as well as breaking the Peruvian record in the hurdles.

Two Colombian athletes also set new championships and Games records in their events: María Lucelly Murillo set new best marks of 56.08 m in the women's discus throw and Rafith Rodríguez won in Colombian record time in the 800 metres (1:47.20). Other record breaking performances of note included Ana Camila Pirelli's Paraguayan record in heptathlon, although this was only enough for the bronze in the competition.

The 10,000 m gold medallist and 5000 m runner-up Karina Alvarez of Peru was stripped of her medals after failing a drugs test for cocaine. Bolivian 400 m runner Alison Mariana Delfin – who helped win a relay bronze medal – was also later disqualified and banned for two years due to a doping offence.

== Medal summary ==
=== Men ===
Event	Gold	Silver	Bronze
100 m (wind: 2.2 m/s)	Isidro Valencia; Colombia	Álvaro Gómez; Colombia	Diego Rivas; Venezuela
200 m	Arturo Ramirez; Venezuela	Luis Carlos Nuñez; Colombia	Rubens Quirino; Brazil
400 m	Omar Longart; Venezuela	Hederson Estefani; Brazil	Helder Alves; Brazil
800 m	Rafith Rodríguez; Colombia	Lutimar Paes; Brazil	Diomar Souza; Brazil
1500 m	Ivan Guido Bilbao; Chile	Marvin Blanco; Venezuela	Mauricio Gonzalez; Colombia
5000 m	Mauricio Gonzalez; Colombia	Javier Andres Cabrera; Colombia	Victor Pincheira; Chile
10,000 m	Javier Andres Cabrera; Colombia	Daniel Silva; Brazil	Gilberto Lopes; Brazil
110 m hurdles	Jorge McFarlane; Peru	Jolver Lozano; Colombia	Javier McFarlane; Peru
400 m hurdles	Juan Pablo Maturana; Colombia	Geormi Jaramillo; Venezuela	Brayan Ambuila; Colombia
3000 m steeplechase	Marvin Blanco; Venezuela	Luis Millan; Venezuela	Mauricio Verdugo; Chile
20,000 m walk	Mauricio Jose Sanchez; Ecuador	Omar Sierra; Colombia	Caio Bonfim; Brazil
4 × 100 m relay	Isidro Valencia; Luis Carlos Nunez; Álvaro Gómez; Diego Vergara; Colombia	Omar Longart; Arturo Ramirez; Alvaro Cassiani; Diego Rivas; Venezuela	Gustavo Santos; Rubens Quirino; Helder Alves; Jonathan Henrique Silva; Brazil
4 × 400 m relay	Ruben Headly; Georni Jaramillo; Arturo Ramirez; Omar Longart; Venezuela	José Oliveira; Hederson Estefani; Henrique Souza; Helder Alves; Brazil	Juan Pablo Maturana; Brayan Ambuila; Javier Hurtado; Rafith Rodríguez; Colombia
High jump	Diego Javier Valencia; Ecuador	Carlos Izquierdo; Colombia	Simon Villa Arango; Colombia
Pole vault	Augusto de Oliveira; Brazil	Cleber Silva; Brazil	Rubén Benítez; Argentina
Long jump	Jorge McFarlane; Peru	Javier McFarlane; Peru	Lourival Almeida; Brazil
Triple jump	Robin Mosquera; Colombia	Jean Rosa; Brazil	Jose Adrian Carreno; Ecuador
Shot put	Eder Moreno; Colombia	Nicola Martina; Argentina	Michael Kevin Vidal; Peru
Discus throw	Andres Rossini; Argentina	Michael Kevin Vidal; Peru	Nicolas Martina; Argentina
Javelin throw	Victor Abel Riveros; Paraguay	Lucas Silva; Brazil	Tomas Martorell; Chile
Hammer throw	Allan Wolski; Brazil	Prinston Quailey; Venezuela	Guillermo Salazar; Ecuador
Decathlon	Diego Pereira de Araujo; Brazil	Pedro Lima; Brazil	Damian Benedetich; Argentina

=== Women ===
Event	Gold	Silver	Bronze
100 m	Ana Claudia Silva; Brazil	Yomara Hinestroza; Colombia	Nelcy Caicedo; Colombia
200 m	Ericka Belinda Quinteros; Ecuador	Vanda Gomes; Brazil	Bárbara Leôncio; Brazil
400 m	Barbara Oliveira; Brazil	Jennifer Padilla; Colombia	Yanet Largacha; Colombia
800 m	Jessica Santos; Brazil	Geisiane Lima; Brazil	Evangelina Thomas; Argentina
1500 m	Evangelina Thomas; Argentina	Rocio Alvarez; Peru	Jenifer Silva; Brazil
5000 m	Tatiele Carvalho; Brazil	Aura Maria Hincapie; Colombia	Charo Quinto; Peru
10,000 m	Yony Umiyauri; Peru	Aura Maria Hincapie; Colombia	Ana Brandao; Brazil
100 m hurdles	Agustina Zerboni; Argentina	Anita Souza; Brazil	Giuliana Maria Tovar; Peru
400 m hurdles	Magdalena Mendoza; Venezuela	Déborah Rodríguez; Uruguay	Elaine Paixão; Brazil
3000 m steeplechase	Rocio Huillca Alvarez; Peru	Jovana Capani; Peru	Florencia Borelli; Argentina
20,000 m walk	Ingrid Hernández (COL)	Arabelly Orjuela (COL)	Paola Pérez (ECU)
4 × 100 m relay	Vanusa Santos; Vanda Gomes; Ana Claudia Silva; Franciela Krasucki; Brazil	Nelcy Caicedo; Jennifer Padilla; María Alejandra Idrobo; Yomara Hinestroza; Colombia	Maria Ayelen Diogo; Florencia Lamboglia; Constanza Eckhardt; Agustina Zerboni; Argentina
4 × 400 m relay	Time: 3:40.09; Yanet Largacha; María Alejandra Idrobo; Marcela Caicedo; Jennifer Padilla; Colombia	Time: 3:40.68; Barbara Leoncio; Elaine Paixão; Ana Claudia Silva; Barbara Oliveira; Brazil	Time: 3:51.74; Maria Ayelen Diogo; Agustina Zerboni; Juliana Menedez; Florencia Lamboglia; Argentina
High jump	Valdileia Martins; Brazil	Lais Silva; Brazil	Sara Grisales; Colombia
Pole vault	Sara Pereira; Brazil	Raissa Schubert; Brazil	Diana Leyton; Colombia
Long jump	Ana Esperança; Brazil	Munich Tovar; Venezuela	Melissa Valencia; Colombia
Triple jump	Munich Tovar; Venezuela	Bianca Santos; Brazil	Feber Hernandez; Venezuela
Shot put	Natalia Duco Soler; Chile	Angela Marcela Moreno; Colombia	Luz Leyni Montano; Colombia
Discus throw	Fernanda Martins; Brazil	Andressa Morais; Brazil	Luz Leyni Montano; Colombia
Javelin throw	María Lucelly Murillo; Colombia	Olga Katryna Cabrera; Paraguay	Rafaela Gonçalves; Brazil
Hammer throw	Andressa Morais; Brazil	Carla Michel; Brazil	Dukina Freytters; Venezuela
Heptathlon	Agustina Zerboni; Argentina	Cynthia Alves; Brazil	Anna Camila Cubas; Paraguay

== Medal table ==
* Host nation (Colombia)

Rank	Nation	Gold	Silver	Bronze	Total
1	Brazil (BRA)	13	18	11	42
2	Colombia (COL)*	11	11	13	35
3	Venezuela (VEN)	6	6	3	15
4	Peru (PER)	4	6	3	13
5	Argentina (ARG)	4	1	6	11
6	Ecuador (ECU)	3	0	3	6
7	Chile (CHI)	2	0	3	5
8	Paraguay (PAR)	1	1	1	3
9	Uruguay (URU)	0	1	0	1
10	Bolivia (BOL)	0	0	1	1
Totals (10 entries)		44	44	44	132
