= 2010 South American Under-23 Championships in Athletics =

IV South American Under-23 Championships in Athletics
- Dates: March 20–23
- Host city: Medellín, Colombia
- Venue: Estadio Alfonso Galvis Duque at the Unidad Deportiva Atanasio Girardot
- Level: U-23
- Events: 44
- Participation: 13 + 1 guest nation nations

The 4th South American Under-23 Championships in Athletics were held in Medellín, Colombia, at the Estadio Alfonso Galvis Duque at the Unidad Deportiva Atanasio Girardot on March 20–23, 2010. The championships, organized by CONSUDATLE, were held as a part of the South American Games (organized by ODESUR). A detailed report on the results was given. The most prominent result was achieved in the heat of the women's 100 metres by Ana Cláudia Lemos Silva. Her time of 11.17 (wind: 1.4 m/s) equaled the South American and Brazilian record, and set a new championships and games record.

== Participation ==
13 countries participated in the Under-23 Championships. 12 countries: Argentina, Bolivia, Brazil, Chile, Colombia, Ecuador, Guyana, Paraguay, Perú, Suriname, Uruguay, and Venezuela competed in both the South American Games and in the Under-23 Championships. Panamá competed only in the Under-23 Championships, but did not register for the athletics section of the South American Games. The Netherlands Antilles are only member of ODESUR, but not of CONSUDATLE. Their athletes participated in the South American Games, but acted as guest athletes in the South American Under-23 Championships.

== Medal summary ==
Medal winners are published. Detailed results can be found on the website of Todor Krastev, and on the Tilastopaja website.

=== Men ===
Event	Gold		Silver		Bronze	
100 metres (2.2 m/s)	Isidro Montoya (COL)	10.25w	Álvaro Gómez (COL)	10.26w	Diego Rivas (VEN)	10.50w
200 metres (1.3 m/s)	Arturo Ramírez (VEN)	20.99	Luis Carlos Nuñez (COL)	21.05	Rubens Quirino (BRA)	21.29
400 metres	Omar Longart (VEN)	46.09	Hederson Estefani (BRA)	46.85	Helder Alves (BRA)	47.40
800 metres	Rafith Rodríguez (COL)	1:47.20 NR CR	Lutimar Paes (BRA)	1:47.52	Diomar de Souza (BRA)	1:50.14
1500 metres	Iván López (CHI)	3:48.04	Marvin Blanco (VEN)	3:49.65	Mauricio González (COL)	3:50.09
5000 metres	Mauricio González (COL)	14:23.35	Javier Peña (COL)	14:27.62	Víctor Aravena (CHI)	14:45.85
10000 metres	Javier Peña (COL)	30:04.78	Daniel Silva (BRA)	31:03.27	Gilberto Lopes (BRA)	31:22.33
3000 m steeplechase	Marvin Blanco (VEN)	9:11.63	Luis Alberto Orta (VEN)	9:13.54	Mauricio Valdivia (CHI)	9:20.58
110 m hurdles (0.7 m/s)	Jorge McFarlane (PER)	13.75 NR CR	Jolver Lozano (COL)	14.26	Javier McFarlane (PER)	14.29
400 m hurdles	Juan Pablo Maturana (COL)	50.95	Georni Jaramillo (VEN)	51.50	Brayan Ambuila (COL)	51.79
High jump	Diego Ferrín (ECU)	2.18	Carlos Izquierdo (COL)	2.09	Simón Villa (COL)	2.09
Pole vault	Augusto Dutra de Oliveira (BRA)	5.00	Cléber Silva (BRA)	4.80	Rubén Benítez (ARG)	4.70
Long jump*	Jorge McFarlane (PER)	8.09 CR (1.8 m/s)	Jhamal Bowen (PAN)	7.97 =AJR (1.5 m/s)	Javier McFarlane (PER)	7.62 (1.0 m/s)
Triple jump	Robin Mosquera (COL)	16.27 (0.3 m/s)	Jean Rosa (BRA)	16.22 (3.2 m/s)	José Adrián Sornoza (ECU)	16.02 (1.3 m/s)
Shot Put	Eder Moreno (COL)	18.46	Nicolás Martina (ARG)	17.67	Michael Putman (PER)	17.48
Discus Throw	Andres Rossini (ARG)	56.28	Michael Putman (PER)	51.53	Nicolás Martina (ARG)	50.37
Hammer throw	Allan Wolski (BRA)	61.17	Prinston Quailey (VEN)	58.16	Guillermo Braulio (ECU)	55.93
Javelin throw	Víctor Fatecha (PAR)	73.22	Lucas da Silva (BRA)	65.30	Tomás Guerra (CHI)	63.93
Decathlon	Diego de Araújo (BRA)	7204	Pedro Lima (BRA)	7020	Damián Benedetich (ARG)	6835
20,000 m Walk	Mauricio Arteaga (ECU)	1:30:12.1	Omar Sierra (COL)	1:30:58.0	Caio Bonfim (BRA)	1:33:05.1
4 x 100 metres relay	Colombia; Isidro Montoya; Luis Carlos Núñez; Álvaro Gómez; Diego Gallego	39.85	Venezuela; Omar Longart; Arturo Ramírez; Álvaro Cassiani; Diego Rivas	40.22	Brazil; Gustavo dos Santos; Rubens Quirino; Helder Alves; Jonathan Henrique Silva	40.60
4 x 400 metres relay	Venezuela; Rubén Headly; Georni Jaramillo; Arturo Ramírez; Omar Longart	3:06.53 CR	Brazil; José Guilherme de Oliveira; Hederson Estefani; Henrique Souza; Helder Alves	3:07.11	Colombia; Juan Pablo Maturana; Brayan Ambuila; Javier Palacios; Rafith Rodríguez	3:09.03

* Jhamal Bowen from Panamá, won the silver medal in the men's long jump event of the South American Under-23 Championships. However, he was not eligible for gaining a medal at the South American Games, because Panamá did not register for the athletics section of the games.

=== Women ===
Event	Gold		Silver		Bronze	
100 metres (1.5 m/s)	Ana Cláudia Silva (BRA)	11.33	Yomara Hinestroza (COL)	11.63	Nelcy Caicedo (COL)	11.70
200 metres (-0.7 m/s)	Erika Chávez (ECU)	23.71	Vanda Gomes (BRA)	23.82	Bárbara Leôncio (BRA)	23.86
400 metres	Bárbara de Oliveira (BRA)	53.38 CR	Jennifer Padilla (COL)	54.09	Yaneth Largacha (COL)	54.22
800 metres	Jessica dos Santos (BRA)	2:09.72	Geisiane de Lima (BRA)	2:10.98	Evangelina Thomas (ARG)	2:11.58
1500 metres	Evangelina Thomas (ARG)	4:38.07	Rocío Huillca (PER)	4:40.39	Jenifer Silva (BRA)	4:40.90
5000 metres**	Tatiele Roberta de Carvalho (BRA)	17:13.53	Aura Rojas (COL)	17:35.45	Charo Inga (PER)	17:49.41
10000 metres^{†} **	Yoni Ninahuamán (PER)	37:09.92	Aura Rojas (COL)	37:36.67		
3000 m steeplechase	Rocío Huillca (PER)	10:48.53	Jovana de la Cruz (PER)	10:52.35	Florencia Borelli (ARG)	11:10.23
100 m hurdles (0.6 m/s)	Agustina Zerboni (ARG)	13.66	Anita Souza (BRA)	13.69	Giuliana Franciosi (PER)	13.87
400 m hurdles	Magdalena Mendoza (VEN)	59.22	Déborah Rodríguez (URU)	59.76	Elaine Paixão (BRA)	60.89
High jump	Valdiléia Martins (BRA)	1.83	Lais Gabriela da Silva (BRA)	1.77	Sara Muñoz (COL)	1.74
Pole vault	Sara Pereira (BRA)	3.85	Raíssa Schubert (BRA)	3.80	Diana Leyton (COL)	3.70
Long jump	Ana Beatriz Esperança (BRA)	5.99 (1.0 m/s)	Munich Tovar (VEN)	5.97w (2.2 m/s)	Melissa Valencia (COL)	5.96 (1.4 m/s)
Triple jump	Munich Tovar (VEN)	13.25 (2.0 m/s)	Bianca dos Santos (BRA)	13.20 (1.2 m/s)	Feber Hernández (VEN)	12.88 (0.2 m/s)
Shot Put	Natalia Ducó (CHI)	17.71	Ángela Rivas (COL)	16.33	Luz Montaño (COL)	14.54
Discus Throw	Fernanda Raquel Borges (BRA)	55.68 CR	Andressa de Morais (BRA)	53.28	Luz Montaño (COL)	49.09
Hammer throw	Andressa de Morais (BRA)	55.95	Carla Michel (BRA)	55.42	Diurkina Freites (VEN)	55.38
Javelin throw	María Lucelly Murillo (COL)	56.08 NJR CR	Katryna Subeldía (PAR)	52.27	Rafaela Gonçalves (BRA)	50.11
Heptathlon	Agustina Zerboni (ARG)	5362	Cynthia Alves (BRA)	5187	Camila Pirelli (PAR)	5118 NR
20,000 m walk	Ingrid Hernández (COL)	1:42:55.9	Arabelly Orjuela (COL)	1:45:29.4	Paola Pérez (ECU)	1:47:09.8
4 x 100 metres relay	Brazil; Vanusa dos Santos; Vanda Gomes; Ana Cláudia Silva; Franciela Krasucki	44.47	Colombia; Nelcy Caicedo; Jennifer Padilla; María Alejandra Idrobo; Yomara Hinestroza	44.94	Argentina; María Ayelen Diogo; Florencia Lamboglia; Constanza Eckhart; Agustina Zerboni	46.76
4 x 400 metres relay***	Colombia; Yaneth Largacha; María Alejandra Idrobo; Marcela Cuesta; Jennifer Padilla	3:40.09	Brazil; Bárbara Leôncio; Elaine Paixão; Ana Claudia Silva; Bárbara de Oliveira	3:40.68	Argentina; María Ayelen Diogo; Agustina Zerboni; Juliana Menéndez; Florencia Lamboglia	3:51.74

^{†}: The women's 10.000 metres competition was not part of the South American Games, because the minimum number of 4 participating nations was not reached.

== Doping ==
**Karina Villazana from Perú who initially was listed as winner of the women's 10,000 metres event (in 36:48.53) and as silver medalist in the women's 5,000 metres event (in 17:24.31) was disqualified for violating the doping rules by being tested positive for cocaine abuse.

***Alison Sánchez from Bolivia was tested positive for nandrolone. Therefore, the Bolivian 4 x 400 metres relay team where she competed together with Lindy Carla Cavero Garcia, Marysabel Romero Lea Plaza, and Leslie Fernanda Arnez Rivero, lost its bronze medal (in 3:51.04) to Argentina.

== Medal table (unofficial) ==
* Host nation (Colombia)

Rank	Nation	Gold	Silver	Bronze	Total
1	Brazil	13	18	10	41
2	Colombia*	11	13	11	35
3	Venezuela	6	6	3	15
4	Peru	4	3	5	12
5	Argentina	4	1	7	12
6	Ecuador	3	0	3	6
7	Chile	2	0	3	5
8	Paraguay	1	1	1	3
9	Panama	0	1	0	1
9	Uruguay	0	1	0	1
Totals (10 entries)		44	44	43	131

== Team trophies ==
Brazil won the overall team trophy of the South American Under-23 Championships for the 4th time in the role, and additionally the team trophy in the women category. Colombia won the team trophy in the men category for the first time. The number of points from the unofficial count from below based on the published results settled, i.e. by the disqualifications, differ somewhat from those published, without any influence on the order.

=== Total ===
The host country is highlighted in lavender blue

Rank	Nation	Points
1st place, gold medalist(s)	Brazil	385
2nd place, silver medalist(s)	Colombia	305
3rd place, bronze medalist(s)	Venezuela	135
4	Argentina	133
5	Peru	99
6	Ecuador	70
7	Chile	67
8	Paraguay	24
9	Uruguay	14
10	Panama	6
11	Bolivia	4
12	Suriname	2

=== Male ===
The host country is highlighted in lavender blue

Rank	Nation	Points
1st place, gold medalist(s)	Colombia	162
2nd place, silver medalist(s)	Brazil	159
3rd place, bronze medalist(s)	Venezuela	94
4	Argentina	63
4	Peru	50
6	Ecuador	44
7	Chile	35
8	Paraguay	10
9	Uruguay	8
10	Panama	6
11	Suriname	2

=== Female ===
The host country is highlighted in lavender blue

Rank	Nation	Points
1st place, gold medalist(s)	Brazil	226
2nd place, silver medalist(s)	Colombia	143
3rd place, bronze medalist(s)	Argentina	70
4	Peru	49
5	Venezuela	41
6	Chile	32
7	Ecuador	26
8	Paraguay	14
9	Uruguay	6
10	Bolivia	4
