= Gustavo dos Santos =

Brazilian athlete (born 1991)

Personal information
- Born: 21 February 1991 (age 35)

Sport
- Country: Brazil
- Sport: Track and field
- Event(s): 100 metres 4 × 100 metres relay
Medal record
Representing Brazil
Pan American Games
Silver medal – second place	2015 Toronto	4x100m relay

Gustavo dos Santos (born 21 February 1991) is a Brazilian sprinter. He competed in the 4 × 100 metres relay event at the 2015 World Championships in Athletics in Beijing, China.
