= 2006 South American Cross Country Championships =

- Organisers: CONSUDATLE
- Edition: 21st
- Date: March 4–5
- Host city: Mar del Plata, Buenos Aires Province, Argentina
- Venue: Naval Base
- Events: 8
- Distances: 12 km – Senior men 4 km – Men's short 8 km – Junior men (U20); 4 km – Youth men (U18); 8 km – Senior women 4 km – Women's short 6 km – Junior women (U20); 3 km – Youth women (U18)
- Participation: 142 athletes from 10 nations

The 2006 South American Cross Country Championships took place on March 4–5, 2006. The races were held at the Naval Base in Mar del Plata, Argentina. A detailed report of the event was given for the IAAF.

Complete results results for junior and youth competitions, and medal winners were published.

== Medallists ==
Event	Gold		Silver		Bronze	
Individual
Senior men (12 km)	Javier Guarín; Colombia	36:29	Jonathan Monje; Chile	36:55	Byron Piedra; Ecuador	37:06
Men's short (4 km)	Hudson Santos de Souza; Brazil	11:24	Jonathan Monje; Chile	11:25	Roberto Echeverría; Chile	11:26
Junior (U20) men (8 km)	Joilson Bernardo da Silva; Brazil	25:05	Mario Bazán (Peru) Perú	25:09	Reginaldo de Oliveira Campos Júnior; Brazil	25:13
Youth (U18) men (4 km)	Víctor Aravena; Chile	12:01	Joaquín Arbe; Argentina	12:20	Eduardo Gregorio; Uruguay	12:22
Senior women (8 km)	Inés Melchor (Peru) Perú	27:55	Rosa Apaza; Bolivia	28:08	Maria Lúcia Alves Vieira; Brazil	28:11
Women's short (4 km)	Valeria Rodríguez; Argentina	13:34	Rosa Apaza; Bolivia	13:35	Yeisy Álvarez; Venezuela	13:38
Junior (U20) women (6 km)	Karina Villazana (Peru) Perú	21:58	Rocío Cántara (Peru) Perú	22:02	Michele Cristina das Chagas; Brazil	22:13
Youth (U18) women (3 km)	Adriely da Silva Araújo; Brazil	10:44	Cynthia Andrea Ubilla; Chile	10:48	Bárbara Lisette González; Chile	10:50
Team
Senior men	Brazil	19	Ecuador	23	Chile	25
Men's short	Chile	9	Brazil	14	Venezuela	24
Junior (U20) men	Brazil	10	Colombia	22	Uruguay	40
Youth (U18) men	Chile	11	Uruguay	16	Argentina	19
Senior women	Venezuela	18	Brazil	22	Colombia	23
Women's short	Argentina	10	Venezuela	24	Brazil	26
Junior (U20) women	(Peru) Perú	8	Brazil	16	Argentina	25
Youth (U18) women	Chile	9	Argentina	27	Paraguay	42

== Race results ==
=== Senior men's race (12 km) ===
Individual race
Rank	Athlete	Country	Time
1st place, gold medalist(s)	Javier Guarín	Colombia	36:29
2nd place, silver medalist(s)	Jonathan Monje	Chile	36:55
3rd place, bronze medalist(s)	Byron Piedra	Ecuador	37:06
4	Claudir Rodrigues	Brazil	37:11
5	José Cicero Eloy	Brazil	37:12
6	Lervis Arias	Venezuela	37:14
7	Roberto Echeverría	Chile	37:15
8	Franklin Tenorio	Ecuador	37:16
9	Luis Fonseca	Venezuela	37:17
10	Benedito Donizetti Gomes	Brazil	37:24
11	Herder Vásquez	Colombia	37:42
12	Silvio Guerra	Ecuador	37:46
13	Didimo Sánchez	Venezuela	37:51
14	Santiago Figueroa	Argentina	37:56
15	Vladimir Guerra	Ecuador	38:04
16	Enzo Yáñez	Chile	38:06
17	Ender Moreno	Venezuela	38:12
18	Miguel Bárzola	Argentina	38:17
19	Alberto Olivera	Argentina	38:18
20	Carlos Jaramillo	Chile	38:22
21	Ernesto Zamora	Uruguay	38:26
22	Eugenio Galaz	Chile	38:31
23	Pablo Gardiol	Uruguay	38:48
24	Rubén Mauricio Ramírez	Uruguay	38:52
25	Daniel Castro	Argentina	39:03
26	Juan Carlos Hernández	Colombia	39:22
27	Reynaldo Huanca	Bolivia	41:07
28	Luis Nogués	Uruguay	41:38

Teams
Rank	Team	Points
1st place, gold medalist(s)	Brazil: Claudir Rodrigues / 4; José Cicero Eloy / 5; Benedito Donizetti Gomes / 10	19
2nd place, silver medalist(s)	Ecuador: Byron Piedra / 3; Franklin Tenorio / 8; Silvio Guerra / 12; (Vladimir Guerra) / (15)	23
3rd place, bronze medalist(s)	Chile: Jonathan Monje / 2; Roberto Echeverría / 7; Enzo Yáñez / 16; (Carlos Jaramillo) / (20); (Eugenio Galaz) / (22)	25
4	Venezuela: Lervis Arias / 6; Luis Fonseca / 9; Didimo Sánchez / 13; (Ender Moreno) / (17)	28
5	Colombia: Javier Guarín / 1; Herder Vásquez / 11; Juan Carlos Hernández / 26	38
6	Argentina: Santiago Figueroa / 14; Miguel Bárzola / 18; Alberto Olivera / 19; (Daniel Castro) / (25)	51
7	Uruguay: Ernesto Zamora / 21; Pablo Gardiol / 23; Rubén Mauricio Ramírez / 24; (Luis Nogués) / (28)	68

- Note: Athletes in parentheses did not score for the team result.

=== Men's short race (4 km) ===
Individual race
Rank	Athlete	Country	Time
1st place, gold medalist(s)	Hudson Santos de Souza	Brazil	11:24
2nd place, silver medalist(s)	Jonathan Monje	Chile	11:25
3rd place, bronze medalist(s)	Roberto Echeverría	Chile	11:26
4	Sergio Lobos	Chile	11:27
5	Ender Moreno	Venezuela	11:30
6	Fábio de Oliveira Chagas	Brazil	11:32
7	André Alberi de Santana	Brazil	11:39
8	Enzo Yáñez	Chile	11:40
9	Freddy González	Venezuela	11:42
10	Lervis Arias	Venezuela	11:45
11	Luis Fonseca	Venezuela	11:47
12^{†}	Martín Mañana	Uruguay	11:48
13^{†}	Didimo Sánchez	Venezuela	11:48
14	Pablo Gardol	Uruguay	11:50
15	Carlos Jaramillo	Chile	11:51
16	José Paúl Ávila	Bolivia	11:52
17	Mariano Mastromarino	Argentina	11:55
18	Germán Schiel	Argentina	11:57
19	Ernesto Zamora	Uruguay	12:06
20	Rubén Acevedo	Uruguay	12:11
21	Esteban Coria	Argentina	12:14
22	Leonardo Price	Argentina	12:32

^{†}: The placings are ambiguous.

Teams
Rank	Team	Points
1st place, gold medalist(s)	Chile: Jonathan Monje / 2; Roberto Echeverría / 3; Sergio Lobos / 4; (Enzo Yáñez) / (8); (Carlos Jaramillo) / (15)	9
2nd place, silver medalist(s)	Brazil: Hudson Santos de Souza / 1; Fábio de Oliveira Chagas / 6; André Alberi de Santana / 7	14
3rd place, bronze medalist(s)	Venezuela: Ender Moreno / 5; Freddy González / 9; Lervis Arias / 10; (Luis Fonseca) / (11); (Didimo Sánchez) / (13)	24
4	Uruguay: Martín Mañana / 12; Pablo Gardol / 14; Ernesto Zamora / 19; (Rubén Acevedo) / (20)	45
5	Argentina: Mariano Mastromarino / 17; Germán Schiel / 18; Esteban Coria / 21; (Leonardo Price) / (22)	56

- Note: Athletes in parentheses did not score for the team result.

=== Junior (U20) men's race (8 km) ===
Individual race
Rank	Athlete	Country	Time
1st place, gold medalist(s)	Joilson Bernardo da Silva	Brazil	25:05
2nd place, silver medalist(s)	Mario Bazán	(Peru) Perú	25:09
3rd place, bronze medalist(s)	Reginaldo de Oliveira Campos Júnior	Brazil	25:13
4	José Mauricio González	Colombia	25:28
5	Jefferson Peña	Colombia	25:35
6	Luís Felipe Leite Barboza	Brazil	25:46
7	Angelo Olivo	Venezuela	26:11
8	Gustavo Espíndola	Argentina	26:31
9	Angel Raúl Portela	Uruguay	26:32
10^{†}	Derlis Ayala	Paraguay	26:37
11^{†}	Miguel Angel Soto	Chile	26:37
12	Oscar Brito	Chile	26:38
13	Luis Carlos Castellanos	Colombia	26:39
14	Carlos Zamora	Uruguay	26:47
15	Aldo Adolfo Franco	Paraguay	26:55
16	Diego Simón	Argentina	26:58
17	José Luis Pérez	Uruguay	27:00
18	Luciano Joaquín Almirón	Argentina	27:01
19	Joaquín Varas	Chile	27:43
20	Washington Rodríguez	Uruguay	27:51
21	Marvin Blanco	Venezuela	27:56
22	Francisco Méndez	Chile	28:07
23	Héctor Damián Jara	Argentina	28:45
24	Carlos Roberto Báez	Paraguay	29:03
25	Roberto Carlos González	Paraguay	29:29

^{†}: The placings are ambiguous.

Teams
Rank	Team	Points
1st place, gold medalist(s)	Brazil: Joilson Bernardo da Silva / 1; Reginaldo de Oliveira Campos Júnior / 3; Luís Felipe Leite Barboza / 6	10
2nd place, silver medalist(s)	Colombia: José Mauricio González / 4; Jefferson Peña / 5; Luis Carlos Castellanos / 13	22
3rd place, bronze medalist(s)	Uruguay: Angel Raúl Portela / 9; Carlos Zamora / 14; José Luis Pérez / 17; (Washington Rodríguez) / (20)	40^{†}
4	Argentina: Gustavo Espíndola / 8; Diego Simón / 16; Luciano Joaquín Almirón / 18; (Héctor Damián Jara) / (23)	42
5	Chile: Miguel Angel Soto / 11; Joaquín Varas / 19; Francisco Méndez / 22	42^{†}
6	Paraguay: Derlis Ayala / 10; Aldo Adolfo Franco / 15; Carlos Roberto Báez / 24; (Roberto Carlos González) / (25)	49

- Note: Athletes in parentheses did not score for the team result.

^{†}: The points scored are ambiguous.

=== Youth (U18) men's race (4 km) ===
Individual race
Rank	Athlete	Country	Time
1st place, gold medalist(s)	Víctor Aravena	Chile	12:01
2nd place, silver medalist(s)	Joaquín Arbe	Argentina	12:20
3rd place, bronze medalist(s)	Eduardo Gregorio	Uruguay	12:22
4	Mauricio Valdivia	Chile	12:23
5^{†}	Carlos Zamora	Uruguay	12:38
5^{†}	Francisco Ponce de León	Chile	12:38
7	Miguel Aparicio	Argentina	12:40
8	Jonathan Sebastián Sasía	Uruguay	12:43
9	Derlis Ayala	Paraguay	12:47
10	Matías Martín Schiel	Argentina	12:49
11	Ramón Contreras	Chile	12:51
12	Ederson Vilela	Brazil	13:00
13	Luis Carlos Castellanos	Colombia	13:10
14	Walter Corbalán	Argentina	13:23
15	Carlos Roberto Báez	Paraguay	13:42
16	Iván González	Paraguay	13:50
17	Gervasio Gastón Tarragona	Uruguay	14:30

^{†}: The placings are ambiguous.

Teams
Rank	Team	Points
1st place, gold medalist(s)	Chile: Víctor Aravena / 1; Mauricio Valdivia / 4; Francisco Ponce de León / 6^{†}	11^{†}
2nd place, silver medalist(s)	Uruguay: Eduardo Gregorio / 3; Carlos Zamora / 5^{†}; Jonathan Sebastián Sasía / 8; (Gervasio Gastón Tarragona) / (17)	16^{†}
3rd place, bronze medalist(s)	Argentina: Joaquín Arbe / 2; Miguel Aparicio / 7; Matías Martín Schiel / 10	19
4	Paraguay: Derlis Ayala / 9; Carlos Roberto Báez / 15; Iván González / 16	40

- Note: Athletes in parentheses did not score for the team result.

^{†}: The points scored are ambiguous.

=== Senior women's race (8 km) ===
Individual race
Rank	Athlete	Country	Time
1st place, gold medalist(s)	Inés Melchor	(Peru) Perú	27:55
2nd place, silver medalist(s)	Rosa Apaza	Bolivia	28:08
3rd place, bronze medalist(s)	Maria Lúcia Alves Vieira	Brazil	28:11
4	Stella Castro	Colombia	28:12
5	Norelys Lugo	Venezuela	28:32
6	Yeisy Álvarez	Venezuela	28:33
7	Yolimar Pineda	Venezuela	28:33
8	Rosa Jussara Barbosa	Brazil	28:52
9	Johanna Riveros	Colombia	28:59
10	Martha Roncería	Colombia	29:00
11	Maria Helena de Jesus Lima de Oliveira	Brazil	29:12
12	Carina Allay	Argentina	29:20
13	Ingrid Galloso	Chile	30:07
14	Andra Doblas	Argentina	30:22
15	Susana Andrea Vergara	Chile	30:27
16	Luz Eliana Silva	Chile	30:51
17	Mercedes Nancy Romero	Argentina	31:02
18	Patricia Tejerina	Argentina	32:02

Teams
Rank	Team	Points
1st place, gold medalist(s)	Venezuela: Norelys Lugo / 5; Yeisy Álvarez / 6; Yolimar Pineda / 7	18
2nd place, silver medalist(s)	Brazil: Maria Lúcia Alves Vieira / 3; Rosa Jussara Barbosa / 8; Maria Helena de Jesús Lima de Oliveira / 11	22
3rd place, bronze medalist(s)	Colombia: Stella Castro / 4; Johanna Riveros / 9; Martha Roncería / 10	23
4	Argentina: Carina Allay / 12; Andra Doblas / 14; Mercedes Nancy Romero / 17; (Patricia Tejerina) / (18)	43
5	Chile: Ingrid Galloso / 13; Susana Andrea Vergara / 15; Luz Eliana Silva / 16	44

- Note: Athletes in parentheses did not score for the team result.

=== Women's short race (4 km) ===
Individual race
Rank	Athlete	Country	Time
1st place, gold medalist(s)	Valeria Rodríguez	Argentina	13:34
2nd place, silver medalist(s)	Rosa Apaza	Bolivia	13:35
3rd place, bronze medalist(s)	Yeisy Álvarez	Venezuela	13:38
4	Carina Allay	Argentina	13:40
5	Nadia Rodríguez	Argentina	13:43
6	Maria Lúcia Alves Vieira	Brazil	13:49
7	María de los Ángeles Peralta	Argentina	13:53
8	Norelys Lugo	Venezuela	13:54
9	Conceição de Maria Carvalho	Brazil	13:54
10	Johana Riveros	Colombia	14:02
11	Gisele Barros de Jesus	Brazil	14:08
12	Ingrid Galloso	Chile	14:09
13	Yolimar Pineda	Venezuela	14:10
14	Maria Helena de Jesus Lima de Oliveira	Brazil	14:18
15	María Basallo	Uruguay	14:21
16	Eliana Vásquez	Chile	14:24
17	Susana Isabel Aburto	Chile	14:31
18	Camila de Mello	Uruguay	14:34
19	Rosa Jussara Barbosa	Brazil	14:39
20	Andrea Solange Oyarzún	Chile	14:42
21	Marisol Redón	Uruguay	15:00
22	Susana Andrea Vergara	Chile	15:04

Teams
Rank	Team	Points
1st place, gold medalist(s)	Argentina: Valeria Rodríguez / 1; Carina Allay / 4; Nadia Rodríguez / 5; (María de los Ángeles Peralta) / (7)	10
2nd place, silver medalist(s)	Venezuela: Yeisy Álvarez / 3; Norelys Lugo / 8; Yolimar Pineda / 13	24
3rd place, bronze medalist(s)	Brazil: Maria Lúcia Alves Vieira / 6; Conceição de Maria Carvalho / 9; Gisele Barros de Jesus / 11; (Maria Helena de Jesus Lima de Oliveira) / (14); (Rosa Jussara Barbosa) / (19)	26
4	Chile: Ingrid Galloso / 12; Eliana Vásquez / 16; Susana Isabel Aburto / 17; (Andrea Solange Oyarzún) / (20); (Susana Andrea Vergara) / (22)	45
5	Uruguay: María Basallo / 15; Camila de Mello / 18; Marisol Redón / 21	54

- Note: Athletes in parentheses did not score for the team result.

=== Junior (U20) women's race (6 km) ===
Individual race
Rank	Athlete	Country	Time
1st place, gold medalist(s)	Karina Villazana	(Peru) Perú	21:58
2nd place, silver medalist(s)	Rocío Cántara	(Peru) Perú	22:02
3rd place, bronze medalist(s)	Michele Cristina das Chagas	Brazil	22:13
4	Sabine Heitling	Brazil	22:29
5	Belén Chaisa	(Peru) Perú	22:36
6	Andrea Latapie	Argentina	22:40
7	Leonela Rodríguez	Argentina	22:50
8	Lissette Gómez	Colombia	22:57
9	Vanessa Rockembach Borella	Brazil	23:20
10	Wendy Guavita	Colombia	23:24
11	Bianca Estrella López	Chile	23:32
12	Ivana Libel Sánchez	Argentina	23:41
13	Angie Orjuela	Colombia	23:54
14	Caroline Leyton	Chile	23:55
15	Olga Almonacid	Chile	24:39
16	Déborah Lezcano	Argentina	25:14
17	Mercedes Ferreira	Paraguay	26:59
18	Karina Centurión	Paraguay	28:22
19	Jessica Esther Balbuena	Paraguay	30:18

Teams
Rank	Team	Points
1st place, gold medalist(s)	(Peru) Perú: Karina Villazana / 1; Rocío Cántara / 2; Belén Chaisa / 5	8
2nd place, silver medalist(s)	Brazil: Michele Cristina das Chagas / 3; Sabine Heitling / 4; Vanessa Rockembach Borella / 9	16
3rd place, bronze medalist(s)	Argentina: Andrea Latapie / 6; Leonela Rodríguez / 7; Ivana Libel Sánchez / 12; (Déborah Lezcano) / (16)	25
4	Colombia: Lissette Gómez / 8; Wendy Guavita / 10; Angie Orjuela / 13	31
5	Chile: Bianca Estrella López / 11; Caroline Leyton / 14; Olga Almonacid / 15	40
6	Paraguay: Mercedes Ferreira / 17; Karina Centurión / 18; Jessica Esther Balbuena / 19	54

- Note: Athletes in parentheses did not score for the team result.

=== Youth (U18) women's race (3 km) ===
Individual race
Rank	Athlete	Country	Time
1st place, gold medalist(s)	Adriely da Silva Araújo	Brazil	10:44
2nd place, silver medalist(s)	Cynthia Andrea Ubilla	Chile	10:48
3rd place, bronze medalist(s)	Bárbara Lisette González	Chile	10:50
4	Verónica Daniela Angel	Chile	10:51
5	Ana Milena Orjuela	Colombia	10:52
6	Patricia Mena	Chile	10:56
7	Laura Cusaria	Colombia	11:05
8	Alejandra Carinao	Argentina	11:06
9	Vanesa Monín	Argentina	11:10
10	Virginia Bazán	Argentina	11:16
11	Rocío Sueldo	Argentina	11:17
12	Stephania Piquerez	Uruguay	11:33
13	Mercedes Ferreira	Paraguay	12:43
14	Eladia Victoria Fernández	Paraguay	13:02
15	Nieve Rivarola	Paraguay	13:16

Teams
Rank	Team	Points
1st place, gold medalist(s)	Chile: Cynthia Andrea Ubilla / 2; Bárbara Lisette González / 3; Verónica Daniela Angel / 4; (Patricia Mena) / (6)	9
2nd place, silver medalist(s)	Argentina: Alejandra Carinao / 8; Vanesa Monín / 9; Virginia Bazán / 10; (Rocío Sueldo) / (11)	27
3rd place, bronze medalist(s)	Paraguay: Mercedes Ferreira / 13; Eladia Victoria Fernández / 14; Nieve Rivarola / 15	42

- Note: Athletes in parentheses did not score for the team result.

== Medal table (unofficial) ==
* Host nation (Argentina)

Rank	Nation	Gold	Silver	Bronze	Total
1	Brazil (BRA)	5	3	4	12
2	Chile (CHI)	4	3	3	10
3	Peru (PER)	3	2	0	5
4	Argentina (ARG)*	2	2	2	6
5	Venezuela (VEN)	1	1	2	4
6	Colombia (COL)	1	1	1	3
7	Bolivia (BOL)	0	2	0	2
8	Uruguay (URU)	0	1	2	3
9	Ecuador (ECU)	0	1	1	2
10	Paraguay (PAR)	0	0	1	1
Totals (10 entries)		16	16	16	48

- Note: Totals include both individual and team medals, with medals in the team competition counting as one medal.

== Participation ==
According to an unofficial count, 142 athletes from 10 countries participated.

- Argentina (31)
- Bolivia (3)
- Brazil (19)
- Chile (27)
- Colombia (15)
- Ecuador (4)
- Paraguay (10)
- (Peru) Perú (5)
- Uruguay (18)
- Venezuela (10)

== See also ==
- 2006 in athletics (track and field)
