= 2007 South American Cross Country Championships =

- Organisers: CONSUDATLE
- Edition: 22nd
- Date: February 25
- Host city: Rio de Janeiro, Brazil
- Venue: Centro de Treinamento da Marinha
- Events: 6
- Distances: 12 km – Senior men 8 km – Junior men (U20); 4 km – Youth men (U18); 8 km – Senior women 6 km – Junior women (U20); 3 km – Youth women (U18)
- Participation: 86 + 1 guest athletes from 10 nations

The 2007 South American Cross Country Championships took place on February 25, 2007. The races were held at the Centro de Treinamento da Marinha in Rio de Janeiro, Brazil. A detailed report of the event was given for the IAAF.

Complete results and results for junior and youth competitions were published.

== Medallists ==
Event	Gold		Silver		Bronze	
Individual
Senior men (12 km)	William de Jesús Naranjo; Colombia	38:45	Claudir Rodrigues; Brazil	38:54	Byron Piedra; Ecuador	38:59
Junior (U20) men (8 km)	Luis Orta; Venezuela	26:40	Jefferson Peña; Colombia	26:43	Javier Andrés Peña; Colombia	26:52
Youth (U18) men (4 km)	Víctor Aravena; Chile	12:43	Éderson Vilela Pereira; Brazil	12:54	Valdison das Neves Silva; Brazil	12:56
Senior women (8 km)	Ednalva Laureano da Silva; Brazil	29:30	Inés Melchor (Peru) Perú	29:34	Maria Zeferina Rodrigues Baldaia; Brazil	29:37
Junior (U20) women (6 km)	Rocío Huillca (Peru) Perú	23:51	Karina Villazana (Peru) Perú	23:56	Claudia Ramírez; Uruguay	23:58
Youth (U18) women (3 km)	Yoni Ninahuamán (Peru) Perú	11:11	Danitza Crisóstomo (Peru) Perú	11:13	Soledad Torre (Peru) Perú	11:15
Team
Senior men	Brazil	8	Ecuador	20	Argentina	24
Junior (U20) men	Colombia	12	Venezuela	18	Brazil	22
Youth (U18) men	Brazil	5	Chile	5		
Senior women	Brazil	6	Argentina	15	Venezuela	24
Junior (U20) women	(Peru) Perú	6	Brazil	15		
Youth (U18) women	(Peru) Perú	3	Brazil	7		

== Race results ==
=== Senior men's race (12 km) ===
Individual race
Rank	Athlete	Country	Time
1st place, gold medalist(s)	William de Jesús Naranjo	Colombia	38:45
2nd place, silver medalist(s)	Claudir Rodrigues	Brazil	38:54
3rd place, bronze medalist(s)	Byron Piedra	Ecuador	38:59
4	Ubiratan José dos Santos	Brazil	39:11
5	Gladson Alberto Silva Barbosa	Brazil	39:32
6	Juan Osvaldo Suárez	Argentina	39:51
7	Silvio Guerra	Ecuador	39:59
8	Everton Luduvice Moraes	Brazil	40:04
9	José Alejandro Semprún	Venezuela	40:15
10	Didimo Sánchez	Venezuela	40:34
11	Roberto Echeverría	Chile	40:38
12	Jorge Cabrera	Paraguay	40:42
13	Roberto Rodrigues Oliveira	Brazil	40:50
14	Juan San Martín	Argentina	40:52
15	Giovanni Amador	Colombia	41:03
16	Daniel Castro	Argentina	41:14
17	Robert Lugo	Venezuela	41:26
18	Edgar Chancusig	Ecuador	41:56
19	Ulises Sanguinetti	Argentina	42:43
20	Aldo González	Paraguay	45:45
—	Santiago Figueroa	Argentina	DNF
—	Jorge Eduardo Aruquipa	Bolivia	DNF
—	Rolando Ortiz	Colombia	DNF
—	Raúl Cardozo	Paraguay	DNF
—	Juan Diego Contreras	(Peru) Perú	DNF
—	Gustavo López	Paraguay	DNF
—	Ender Moreno	Venezuela	DNF

Teams
Rank	Team	Points
1st place, gold medalist(s)	Brazil: Claudir Rodrigues / 1; Ubiratan José dos Santos / 3; Gladson Alberto Silva Barbosa / 4; (Everton Luduvice Moraes) / (n/s); (Roberto Rodrigues Oliveira) / (n/s)	8
2nd place, silver medalist(s)	Ecuador: Byron Piedra / 2; Silvio Guerra / 6; Edgar Chancusig / 12	20
3rd place, bronze medalist(s)	Argentina: Juan Osvaldo Suárez / 5; Juan San Martín / 9; Daniel Castro / 10; (Ulises Sanguinetti) / (n/s); (Santiago Figueroa) / (DNF)	24
4	Venezuela: José Alejandro Semprún / 7; Didimo Sánchez / 8; Robert Lugo / 11; (Ender Moreno) / (DNF)	26
—	Colombia: William de Jesús Naranjo / (n/s); Giovanni Amador / (n/s); Rolando Ortiz / (DNF)	DNF
—	Paraguay: Jorge Cabrera / (n/s); Aldo González / (n/s); Raúl Cardozo / (DNF); (Gustavo López) / (DNF)	DNF

- Note: Athletes in parentheses did not score for the team result. (n/s: nonscorer)

=== Junior (U20) men's race (8 km) ===
Individual race
Rank	Athlete	Country	Time
1st place, gold medalist(s)	Luis Orta	Venezuela	26:40
2nd place, silver medalist(s)	Jefferson Peña	Colombia	26:43
3rd place, bronze medalist(s)	Javier Andrés Peña	Colombia	26:52
4	Derlis Ayala	Paraguay	27:12
5	Carlos Zamora	Uruguay	27:15
6	Ademilson de Morais Santana	Brazil	27:18
7	Marvin Francisco Blanco	Venezuela	27:25
8	Wesley Mancilla	Colombia	27:29
9	Cristopher Guajardo	Chile	27:32
10	Moacir Florentino Junior	Brazil	27:45
11	Clayton Elias Gomes	Brazil	28:23
12	Ángel Portela	Uruguay	28:26
13	Rolando Velázquez	Venezuela	29:46
14	Santiago Godoy	Uruguay	30:42
15	Cristian González	Paraguay	34:00
—	Ronaldo do Carmo Rocha	Brazil	DNF
—	Iván González	Paraguay	DNF

Teams
Rank	Team	Points
1st place, gold medalist(s)	Colombia: Jefferson Peña / 2; Javier Andrés Peña / 3; Wesley Mancilla / 7	12
2nd place, silver medalist(s)	Venezuela: Luis Orta / 1; Marvin Francisco Blanco / 6; Rolando Velázquez / 11	18
3rd place, bronze medalist(s)	Brazil: Ademilson de Morais Santana / 5; Moacir Florentino Junior / 8; Clayton Elias Gomes / 9; (Ronaldo do Carmo Rocha) / (DNF)	22
4	Uruguay: Carlos Zamora / 4; Ángel Portela / 10; Santiago Godoy / 12	26
—	Paraguay: Derlis Ayala / (n/s); Cristian González / (n/s); Iván González / (DNF)	DNF

- Note: Athletes in parentheses did not score for the team result. (n/s: nonscorer)

=== Youth (U18) men's race (4 km) ===
Individual race
Rank	Athlete	Country	Time
1st place, gold medalist(s)	Víctor Aravena	Chile	12:43
2nd place, silver medalist(s)	Éderson Vilela Pereira	Brazil	12:54
3rd place, bronze medalist(s)	Valdison das Neves Silva	Brazil	12:56
4	Iván López	Chile	13:04
5	Derlis Ayala	Paraguay	13:39
6	Antonio Ribeiro Barbosa Filho	Brazil	13:04
7	Daniel Estrada	Chile	14:21
8	Cristian González	Paraguay	15:12

Teams
Rank
Team
Points

Brazil

Éderson Vilela Pereira	2
Valdison das Neves Silva	3
Antonio Ribeiro Barbosa Filho	(n/s)

5

Chile

Víctor Aravena	1
Iván López	4
Daniel Estrada	(n/s)

5

- Note: Athletes in parentheses did not score for the team result. (n/s: nonscorer)

=== Senior women's race (8 km) ===
Individual race
Rank	Athlete	Country	Time
1st place, gold medalist(s)	Ednalva Laureano da Silva	Brazil	29:30
2nd place, silver medalist(s)	Inés Melchor	(Peru) Perú	29:34
3rd place, bronze medalist(s)	Maria Zeferina Rodrigues Baldaia	Brazil	29:37
—	Roxana Preussler^{†}	Argentina	29:49
4	Maria Lucia Alves Vieira Moraes	Brazil	30:00
5	Stella Castro	Colombia	30:02
6	Rosa Jussara Barbosa	Brazil	30:11
7	Valeria Lorena Rodríguez	Argentina	30:15
8	Karina Córdoba	Argentina	30:29
9	Nadia Rodríguez	Argentina	30:46
10	Norelys Lugo	Venezuela	31:03
11	Yeisy Álvarez	Venezuela	31:19
12	Zuleima Amaya	Venezuela	31:19
13	Vanesa Maraviglia	Argentina	31:25
14	Rosa Apaza	Bolivia	31:57
—	Érika Olivera	Chile	DNF

^{†}: Guest athlete.

Teams
Rank	Team	Points
1st place, gold medalist(s)	Brazil: Ednalva Laureano da Silva / 1; Maria Zeferina Rodrigues Baldaia / 2; Maria Lucia Alves Vieira Moraes / 3; (Rosa Jussara Barbosa) / (n/s)	6
2nd place, silver medalist(s)	Argentina: Valeria Lorena Rodríguez / 4; Karina Córdoba / 5; Nadia Rodríguez / 6; (Vanesa Maraviglia) / (n/s)	15
3rd place, bronze medalist(s)	Venezuela: Norelys Lugo / 7; Yeisy Álvarez / 8; Zuleima Amaya / 9	24

- Note: Athletes in parentheses did not score for the team result. (n/s: nonscorer)

=== Junior (U20) women's race (6 km) ===
Individual race
Rank	Athlete	Country	Time
1st place, gold medalist(s)	Rocío Huillca	(Peru) Perú	23:51
2nd place, silver medalist(s)	Karina Villazana	(Peru) Perú	23:56
3rd place, bronze medalist(s)	Claudia Ramírez	Uruguay	23:58
4	Margoth Cjuiro	(Peru) Perú	24:05
5	Angie Orjuela	Colombia	25:10
6	Francisca Alarcón	Chile	25:45
7	Tatiane Raquel da Silva	Brazil	26:50
8	Poliana Oliveira Borges	Brazil	26:58
9	Patricia Fernandes da Costa	Brazil	28:15
—	Luzia de Souza Lining	Brazil	DNF
—	Jessica Balbuena	Paraguay	DNF

Teams
Rank
Team
Points

(Peru) Perú

Rocío Huillca	1
Karina Villazana	2
Margoth Cjuiro	3

6

Brazil

Tatiane Raquel da Silva	4
Poliana Oliveira Borges	5
Patricia Fernandes da Costa	6
(Luzia de Souza Lining)	(DNF)

15

- Note: Athletes in parentheses did not score for the team result. (n/s: nonscorer)

=== Youth (U18) women's race (3 km) ===
Individual race
Rank	Athlete	Country	Time
1st place, gold medalist(s)	Yoni Ninahuamán	(Peru) Perú	11:11
2nd place, silver medalist(s)	Danitza Crisóstomo	(Peru) Perú	11:13
3rd place, bronze medalist(s)	Soledad Torre	(Peru) Perú	11:15
4	Tatiana Raquel da Silva	Brazil	11:29
5	Jessica Pellario Bueno	Brazil	11:31
6	Luzia de Souza Lining	Brazil	11:51
7	Bárbara González	Chile	12:02
8	Solange Martínez	Chile	12:07
9	Elena Fernández	Paraguay	12:16
10	Pámela Ángel	Chile	12:38
11	Fabiana Ocampos	Paraguay	13:06

Teams
Rank
Team
Points

(Peru) Perú

Yoni Ninahuamán	1
Danitza Crisóstomo	2
Soledad Torre	(n/s)

3

Brazil

Tatiana Raquel da Silva	3
Jessica Pellario Bueno	4
Luzia de Souza Lining	(n/s)

7

- Note: Athletes in parentheses did not score for the team result. (n/s: nonscorer)

== Medal table (unofficial) ==
* Host nation (Brazil)

Rank	Nation	Gold	Silver	Bronze	Total
1	Brazil (BRA)*	4	4	3	11
2	Peru (PER)	4	3	1	8
3	Colombia (COL)	2	1	1	4
4	Venezuela (VEN)	1	1	1	3
5	Chile (CHI)	1	1	0	2
6	Argentina (ARG)	0	1	1	2
6	Ecuador (ECU)	0	1	1	2
8	Uruguay (URU)	0	0	1	1
Totals (8 entries)		12	12	9	33

- Note: Totals include both individual and team medals, with medals in the team competition counting as one medal.

== Participation ==
According to an unofficial count, 86 athletes (+ 1 guest) from 10 countries participated.

- Argentina (9 + 1 guest)
- Bolivia (2)
- Brazil (22)
- Chile (10)
- Colombia (8)
- Ecuador (3)
- Paraguay (10)
- (Peru) Perú (8)
- Uruguay (4)
- Venezuela (10)

== See also ==
- 2007 in athletics (track and field)
