= Athletics at the 2014 Central American and Caribbean Games – Results =

These are the full results of the athletics competition at the 2014 Central American and Caribbean Games which took place between November 23 and November 30, 2014, at Heriberto Jara Corona Stadium in Xalapa, Veracruz, Mexico.

== Men's results ==
=== 100 meters ===
Heat 1 – 24 November 10:30 – Wind: -1.0 m/s – Temperature: 24 °C – Humidity: 58%

Rank	Name	Nationality	Lane	Reaction time	Time	Notes
1	Yancarlos Martínez	Dominican Republic	1	0.195	10.35	Q
2	Yaniel Carrero	Cuba	3	0.142	10.37	Q
3	Isidro Montoya	Colombia	2	0.167	10.41	q
4	Dubeiker Cedeño	Venezuela	5	0.161	10.53	
5	José Carlos Herrera	Mexico	7	0.165	10.58	
6	Allistar Clarke	Saint Kitts and Nevis	8	0.149	10.60	
7	Jeffrey Vanan	Suriname	6	0.184	10.74	
8	Virgilio Griggs	Panama	4	0.169	10.82	

Heat 2 – 24 November 10:37 – Wind: -0.7 m/s

Rank	Name	Nationality	Lane	Reaction time	Time	Notes
1	Adrian Griffith	Bahamas	6	0.152	10.41	Q
2	Levi Cadogan	Barbados	3	0.159	10.45	Q
3	Diego Palomeque	Colombia	4	0.195	10.45	
4	Emmanuel Callender	Trinidad and Tobago	2	0.154	10.46	
5	Josef Norales	Honduras	8	0.196	10.58	
6	Adam Harris	Guyana	1	0.131	10.75	
7	Paul Williams	Grenada	7	0.156	10.93	
8	McKish Rostannio Shahid Compton	Saint Vincent and the Grenadines	5	0.202	11.06	

Heat 3 – 24 November 10:44 – Wind: +0.4 m/s

Rank	Name	Nationality	Lane	Reaction time	Time	Notes
1	Cruz Rolando Palacios	Honduras	2	0.152	10.26	Q
2	Yoandry Andújar	Dominican Republic	1	0.157	10.29	Q SB
3	Yadier Luis	Cuba	6	0.163	10.38	q
4	Arturo Ramírez	Venezuela	8	0.140	10.41	
5	Héctor Manuel Ruíz	Mexico	5	0.177	10.53	
6	Kemar Hyman	Cayman Islands	3	0.158	10.78	
7	Michael Wilson	Grenada	4	0.168	10.84	SB
8	Jeremy Bascom	Guyana	7	0.157	10.92	

Final – 25 November 15:05 – Wind: +0.9 – Temperature: 16 °C – Humidity: 85%

Rank	Name	Nationality	Lane	Reaction time	Time	Notes
1st place, gold medalist(s)	Cruz Rolando Palacios	Honduras	5	0.136	10.27	
2nd place, silver medalist(s)	Levi Cadogan	Barbados	7	0.135	10.27	
3rd place, bronze medalist(s)	Yaniel Carrero	Cuba	8	0.171	10.28	PB
4	Yancarlos Martínez	Dominican Republic	4	0.172	10.29	
5	Isidro Montoya	Colombia	1	0.153	10.33	
6	Yoandry Andújar	Dominican Republic	6	0.182	10.34	
7	Yadier Luis	Cuba	2	0.149	10.35	
8	Adrian Griffith	Bahamas	3	0.166	10.48	

=== 200 meters ===
Heat 1 – 26 November 11:25 – Wind: -0.8 m/s – Temperature: 14 °C – Humidity: 80%

Rank	Name	Nationality	Lane	Reaction time	Time	Notes
1	José Carlos Herrera	Mexico	2	0.166	20.78	Q
2	Stanly del Carmen	Dominican Republic	3	0.167	21.28	Q
3	Emmanuel Callender	Trinidad and Tobago	4	0.151	21.33	Q
4	Virjilio Griggs	Panama	8	0.173	21.49	
5	Richard Richardson	Antigua and Barbuda	7	0.227	21.50	
6	Jhon Perlaza	Colombia	6	0.179	21.79	
	Winston George	Guyana	5	0.246	DNF	

Heat 2 – 26 November 11:32 – Wind: -0.8 m/s

Rank	Name	Nationality	Lane	Reaction time	Time	Notes
1	Cruz Rolando Palacios	Honduras	8	0.190	20.85	Q
2	Reynier Mena	Cuba	3	0.162	20.88	Q
3	Héctor Manuel Ruíz	Mexico	5	0.183	21.37	Q
4	Fallon Forde	Barbados	2	0.200	21.48	q
5	Gary Robinson	Costa Rica	7	0.219	21.56	
6	Nassive Powell	Jamaica	6	0.193	22.04	
	McKish Rostannio Shahid Compton	Saint Vincent and the Grenadines	4		DNS	

Heat 3 – 26 November 11:39 – Wind: +1.9 m/s

Rank	Name	Nationality	Lane	Reaction time	Time	Notes
1	Kyle Greaux	Trinidad and Tobago	6	0.205	20.97	Q
2	Stephan James	Guyana	8	0.176	21.29	Q
3	Adrian Griffith	Bahamas	4	0.179	21.41	Q
4	Joel Redhead	Grenada	7	0.195	21.42	q
5	Andrés Rodríguez	Panama	5	0.130	21.47	q
6	Jeffrey Vanan	Suriname	3	0.209	21.78	
7	Josef Norales	Honduras	2	0.301	21.85	

Heat 4 – 26 November 11:46 – Wind: +0.6 m/s

Rank	Name	Nationality	Lane	Reaction time	Time	Notes
1	Roberto Skyers	Cuba	5	0.186	20.78	Q
2	Arturo Ramírez	Venezuela	7	0.157	21.11	Q PB
3	Levi Cadogan	Barbados	3	0.157	21.17	Q
4	Gustavo Cuesta	Dominican Republic	4	0.189	21.27	q
5	Jamial Rolle	Bahamas	2	0.234	21.68	
6	Marzel Miller	Jamaica	6	0.176	22.62	
	Erison Hurtault	Dominica	8		DNS	

Semifinal 1 – 26 November 13:35 – Wind: -0.4 m/s – Temperature: 16 °C – Humidity: 74%

Rank	Name	Nationality	Lane	Reaction time	Time	Notes
1	Reynier Mena	Cuba	6	0.163	20.50	Q PB
2	José Carlos Herrera	Mexico	4	0.165	20.52	Q
3	Kyle Greaux	Trinidad and Tobago	5	0.183	20.83	Q
4	Levi Cadogan	Barbados	8	0.161	21.16	Q
5	Stephan James	Guyana	3	0.164	21.25	
6	Adrian Griffith	Bahamas	7	0.174	21.38	
7	Andrés Rodríguez	Panama	2	0.183	21.50	
8	Gustavo Cuesta	Dominican Republic	1	0.215	21.55	

Semifinal 2 – 26 November 13:42 – Wind: -0.2 m/s

Rank	Name	Nationality	Lane	Reaction time	Time	Notes
1	Roberto Skyers	Cuba	4	0.159	20.66	Q
2	Cruz Rolando Palacios	Honduras	5	0.170	20.71	Q
3	Arturo Ramírez	Venezuela	6	0.186	20.92	Q PB
4	Héctor Manuel Ruíz	Mexico	7	0.183	21.26	Q
5	Stanly del Carmen	Dominican Republic	3	0.165	21.27	
6	Fallon Forde	Barbados	2	0.176	21.61	
7	Joel Redhead	Grenada	1	0.208	21.66	
	Emmanuel Callender	Trinidad and Tobago	8		DSQ	R 163.3

Final – 27 November 13:50 – Wind: -1.8 – Temperature: 16 °C – Humidity: 62%

Rank	Name	Nationality	Lane	Reaction time	Time	Notes
1st place, gold medalist(s)	Roberto Skyers	Cuba	3	0.165	20.47	
2nd place, silver medalist(s)	Reynier Mena	Cuba	5	0.148	20.54	
3rd place, bronze medalist(s)	José Carlos Herrera	Mexico	6	0.178	20.63	
4	Cruz Rolando Palacios	Honduras	4	0.168	20.76	
5	Kyle Greaux	Trinidad and Tobago	8	0.206	20.95	
6	Arturo Ramírez	Venezuela	7	0.171	21.00	PB
7	Héctor Manuel Ruíz	Mexico	2	0.185	21.43	
	Levi Cadogan	Barbados	1		DNS	

=== 400 meters ===
Heat 1 – 25 November 13:40 – Temperature: 17 °C – Humidity: 89%

Rank	Name	Nationality	Lane	Reaction time	Time	Notes
1	Alberth Bravo	Venezuela	3	0.215	45.21	Q, NR
2	Yoandys Lescay	Cuba	4	0.274	45.81	Q
3	Nery Brenes	Costa Rica	8	0.208	46.00	q
4	Yon Soriano	Dominican Republic	6	0.302	46.05	q SB
5	Stephan James	Guyana	5	0.203	46.92	
6	Warren Hazel	Saint Kitts and Nevis	2	0.196	48.54	
7	Alvin Green	Jamaica	7	0.243	48.93	

Heat 2 – 25 November 13:47

Rank	Name	Nationality	Lane	Reaction time	Time	Notes
1	Raidel Acea	Cuba	5	0.254	45.89	Q PB
2	Juander Santos	Dominican Republic	7	0.193	46.45	Q SB
3	José Meléndez	Venezuela	6	0.212	46.62	
4	Bernardo Baloyes	Colombia	4	0.193	47.03	
5	Kegan Campbell	Jamaica	3	0.232	48.56	
6	José de Jesús Fraire	Mexico	2	0.289	48.87	
	Alie Beauvais	Haiti	8	0.783	DNF	

Heat 3 – 25 November 13:54

Rank	Name	Nationality	Lane	Reaction time	Time	Notes
1	Carlos Andrés Lemos	Colombia	5	0.273	46.70	Q
2	Winston George	Guyana	6	0.251	46.88	Q
3	Diego Moreno	Mexico	7	0.212	47.23	SB
4	Erison Hurtault	Dominica	3	0.229	47.24	
5	Wesley Neymour	Bahamas	8	0.236	47.25	
6	Kimorie Shearman	Saint Vincent and the Grenadines	4	0.292	49.02	PB

Final – 26 November 14:20 – Temperature: 16 °C – Humidity: 72%

Rank	Name	Nationality	Lane	Reaction time	Time	Notes
1st place, gold medalist(s)	Raidel Acea	Cuba	3	0.209	45.36	PB
2nd place, silver medalist(s)	Yoandys Lescay	Cuba	5	0.215	45.56	
3rd place, bronze medalist(s)	Alberth Bravo	Venezuela	4	0.211	45.82	
4	Juander Santos	Dominican Republic	8	0.247	45.93	SB
5	Winston George	Guyana	7	0.204	46.33	
6	Carlos Andrés Lemos	Colombia	6	0.244	46.64	
7	Yon Soriano	Dominican Republic	1	0.289	46.73	
8	Nery Brenes	Costa Rica	2	0.165	46.82	

=== 800 meters ===
Heat 1 – 26 November 10:35 – Temperature: 13 °C – Humidity: 81%

Rank	Name	Nationality	Lane	Time	Notes
1	Rafith Rodríguez	Colombia	5	1:49.48	Q
2	Jorge Liranzo	Cuba	2	1:49.57	Q
3	Lucirio Antonio Garrido	Venezuela	7	1:49.94	Q
4	Bryan Antonio Martínez	Mexico	6	1:50.14	q
5	Moise Joseph	Haiti	3	1:52.69	
6	David Hodgson	Costa Rica	8	1:52.82	SB
	Joel Mejía	Dominican Republic	4	DNF	

Heat 2 – 26 November 10:42

Rank	Name	Nationality	Lane	Time	Notes
1	Wesley Vázquez	Puerto Rico	5	1:50.33	Q
2	Andy González	Cuba	8	1:51.44	Q
3	Tayron Reyes	Dominican Republic	7	1:51.66	Q
4	James Eichberger	Mexico	3	1:51.67	q
5	Kendis Bullard	Trinidad and Tobago	2	1:53.63	
6	Víctor Emilio Ortiz	Costa Rica	6	1:54.03	
7	Kasique Oliver	Saint Vincent and the Grenadines	4	1:56.98	PB

Final – 28 November 11:20 – Temperature: 15 °C – Humidity: 72%

Rank	Name	Nationality	Lane	Time	Notes
1st place, gold medalist(s)	Andy González	Cuba	4	1:45.73	SB
2nd place, silver medalist(s)	Rafith Rodríguez	Colombia	3	1:45.74	
3rd place, bronze medalist(s)	Wesley Vázquez	Puerto Rico	5	1:46.05	
4	Jorge Liranzo	Cuba	6	1:47.22	
5	Lucirio Antonio Garrido	Venezuela	7	1:48.49	
6	Tayron Reyes	Dominican Republic	1	1:49.32	
7	James Eichberger	Mexico	8	1:50.29	
8	Bryan Antonio Martínez	Mexico	2	1:51.58	

=== 1500 meters ===
Final – 27 November 13:10 – Temperature: 16 °C – Humidity: 62%

Rank	Name	Nationality	Time	Notes
1st place, gold medalist(s)	Andy González	Cuba	3:45.52	SB
2nd place, silver medalist(s)	Pablo Solares	Mexico	3:45.62	
3rd place, bronze medalist(s)	Christopher Sandoval	Mexico	3:47.55	
4	Freddy Espinosa	Colombia	3:48.29	
5	Marvin Blanco	Venezuela	3:48.75	
6	Alfredo Santana	Puerto Rico	3:52.78	
7	Erick Rodríguez	Nicaragua	3:53.27	PB
8	Álvaro Vásquez	Nicaragua	3:55.22	
9	Jamaal James	Trinidad and Tobago	4:00.58	
10	James Saël	Haiti	4:22.04	
11	Félix Lafontant	Haiti	4:26.83	
	Delohnni Nicol-Samuel	Saint Vincent and the Grenadines	DNS	

=== 5000 meters ===
Final – 24 November 13:30 – Temperature: 25 °C – Humidity: 63%

Rank	Name	Nationality	Time	Notes
1st place, gold medalist(s)	Juan Luis Barrios	Mexico	14:15.98	
2nd place, silver medalist(s)	Iván Darío González	Colombia	14:25.16	
3rd place, bronze medalist(s)	Mario Pacay	Guatemala	14:27.34	SB
4	Sergio Pedraza	Mexico	14:57.51	
5	Liván Luque	Cuba	15:14.10	
6	Alfredo Santana	Puerto Rico	15:29.40	
7	Álvaro Louis Sanabria	Costa Rica	15:34.08	
8	Mark Henri Allen	Haiti	15:35.93	
9	Delohnni Nicol-Samuel	Saint Vincent and the Grenadines	15:47.45	
	Gerard Giraldo	Colombia	DNF	

=== 10,000 meters ===
Final – 27 November 11:45 – Temperature: 16 °C – Humidity: 62%

Rank	Name	Nationality	Time	Notes
1st place, gold medalist(s)	Juan Luis Barrios	Mexico	29:13.63	
2nd place, silver medalist(s)	Juan Carlos Romero	Mexico	29:28.32	
3rd place, bronze medalist(s)	Iván Darío González	Colombia	29:41.31	
4	Eduardo Terrance Garcia	U.S. Virgin Islands	30:51.43	
5	Álvaro Louis Sanabria	Costa Rica	31:23.04	
6	Dimas Castro	Nicaragua	33:08.46	
	Liván Luque	Cuba	DNF	
	Mario Pacay	Guatemala	DNF	

=== Marathon ===
Final – 30 November 11:45

Rank	Name	Nationality	Time	Notes
1st place, gold medalist(s)	Richer Pérez	Cuba	2:19:13	PB
2nd place, silver medalist(s)	José Amado García	Guatemala	2:19:45	
3rd place, bronze medalist(s)	Daniel de Jesús Vargas	Mexico	2:20:27	
4	Juan Carlos Cardona	Colombia	2:21:32	
5	Tomás Luna	Mexico	2:22:31	SB
6	Alfredo Arévalo	Guatemala	2:26:34	
7	Pedro Mora	Venezuela	2:29:48	
8	Dimas Castro	Nicaragua	2:43:58	
	Luis Orta	Venezuela	DNF	

=== 110 meters hurdles ===
Heat 1 – 27 November 11:25 – Wind: -1.4 m/s – Temperature: 16 °C – Humidity: 62%

Rank	Name	Nationality	Lane	Reaction time	Time	Notes
1	Yordan Luis O'Farrill	Cuba	6	0.247	13.63	Q
2	Eddie Lovett	U.S. Virgin Islands	3	0.200	13.82	Q
3	Mikel Thomas	Trinidad and Tobago	5	0.175	14.08	Q
4	Eric Keddo	Jamaica	4	0.179	14.18	q SB
5	Pedro Antonio Bustamante	Mexico	7	0.448	14.33	

Heat 2 – 27 November 11:32 – Wind: -1.6 m/s

Rank	Name	Nationality	Lane	Reaction time	Time	Notes
1	Greggmar Swift	Barbados	6	0.176	13.62	Q
2	Jhoanis Portilla	Cuba	4	0.169	13.74	Q
3	Jeffrey Julmis	Haiti	8	0.173	14.02	Q
4	Genaro Rodríguez	Mexico	5	0.203	14.03	q
5	Ronald Forbes	Cayman Islands	7	0.151	14.51	
6	Luis Carlos Bonilla	Guatemala	3	0.273	15.31	

Final – 28 November 10:55 – Wind: +0.7 – Temperature: 15 °C – Humidity: 75%

Rank	Name	Nationality	Lane	Reaction time	Time	Notes
1st place, gold medalist(s)	Yordan Luis O'Farrill	Cuba	3	0.173	13.46	
2nd place, silver medalist(s)	Jhoanis Portilla	Cuba	5	0.152	13.53	
3rd place, bronze medalist(s)	Greggmar Swift	Barbados	6	0.180	13.59	
4	Eddie Lovett	U.S. Virgin Islands	4	0.198	13.79	
5	Mikel Thomas	Trinidad and Tobago	7	0.167	13.83	
6	Genaro Rodríguez	Mexico	2	0.230	14.04	
7	Eric Keddo	Jamaica	1	0.190	14.53	
	Jeffrey Julmis	Haiti	8	0.175	DNF	

=== 400 meters hurdles ===
Heat 1 – 26 November 12:00 – Temperature: 14 °C – Humidity: 80%

Rank	Name	Nationality	Lane	Reaction time	Time	Notes
1	Omar Cisneros	Cuba	4	0.265	50.61	Q SB
2	Eric Alejandro	Puerto Rico	7	0.265	51.12	Q
3	Gerald Drummond	Costa Rica	5	0.219	51.39	Q
4	Lucirio Francisco Garrido	Venezuela	2	0.317	51.57	q
5	Winder Cuevas	Dominican Republic	3	0.208	51.93	q
6	Héctor David Gómez	Mexico	6	0.205	52.37	
	Andre Clarke	Jamaica	8		DSQ	R 169.7

Heat 2 – 26 November 12:07

Rank	Name	Nationality	Lane	Reaction time	Time	Notes
1	Víctor Solarte	Venezuela	7	0.249	51.14	Q PB
2	Leslie Murray	U.S. Virgin Islands	3	0.179	51.76	Q
3	Gerber Blanco	Guatemala	5	0.194	52.03	Q
4	Alie Beauvais	Haiti	1	0.243	52.16	
5	Yeferson Valencia	Colombia	2	0.243	52.47	
	José Luis Gaspar	Cuba	8	0.224	DNF	
	Sergio Ríos	Mexico	6	0.180	DNF	
	Kenneth Medwood	Belize	4		DNS	

Final – 27 November 14:15 – Temperature: 16 °C – Humidity: 62%

Rank	Name	Nationality	Lane	Reaction time	Time	Notes
1st place, gold medalist(s)	Omar Cisneros	Cuba	5	0.260	49.56	SB
2nd place, silver medalist(s)	Eric Alejandro	Puerto Rico	6	0.226	50.05	
3rd place, bronze medalist(s)	Leslie Murray	U.S. Virgin Islands	4	0.200	50.21	SB
4	Gerber Blanco	Guatemala	7	0.171	50.38	SB
5	Gerald Drummond	Costa Rica	8	0.187	50.72	
6	Víctor Solarte	Venezuela	3	0.191	51.01	PB
7	Winder Cuevas	Dominican Republic	2	0.231	51.20	
8	Lucirio Francisco Garrido	Venezuela	1	0.196	51.45	

=== 3000 meters steeplechase ===
Final – 28 November 13:05 – Temperature: 16 °C – Humidity: 77%

Rank	Name	Nationality	Time	Notes
1st place, gold medalist(s)	Marvin Blanco	Venezuela	8:43.76	
2nd place, silver medalist(s)	José Peña	Venezuela	8:45.04	
3rd place, bronze medalist(s)	Luis Enrique Ibarra	Mexico	8:48.42	
4	Gerald Giraldo	Colombia	8:56.59	
5	Javier Quintana	Mexico	9:01.09	
6	Álvaro Abreu	Dominican Republic	9:08.13	
7	Erick Rodríguez	Nicaragua	9:14.94	PB
8	Álvaro Vásquez	Nicaragua	9:18.13	

=== 4 × 100 meters relay ===
Final – 28 November 12:40 – Temperature: 16 °C – Humidity: 77%

Rank	Nation	Competitors	Lane	Reaction time	Time	Notes
1st place, gold medalist(s)	Cuba	César Yadiel Ruíz; Reynier Mena; Yadier Luis; Yaniel Carrero	7	0.227	38.94	
2nd place, silver medalist(s)	Dominican Republic	Gustavo Cuesta; Yoandry Andújar; Stanly del Carmen; Yancarlos Martínez	3	0.160	39.01	SB
3rd place, bronze medalist(s)	Venezuela	Alberto Aguilar; Dubeiker Cedeño; Álvaro Cassiani; Arturo Ramírez	5	0.215	39.22	SB
4	Saint Kitts and Nevis	Jason Rogers; Brijesh Lawrence; Antoine Adams; Allistar Clarke	8	0.267	39.35	
5	Guyana	Jeremy Bascom; Stephan James; Winston George; Adam Harris	6	0.219	39.74	
6	Mexico	Heber Gallegos; Juan Carlos Alanis; Héctor Manuel Ruíz; José Carlos Herrera	4	0.250	40.21	

=== 4 × 400 meters relay ===
Final – 28 November 14:00 – Temperature: 16 °C – Humidity: 77%

Rank	Nation	Competitors	Lane	Reaction time	Time	Notes
1st place, gold medalist(s)	Cuba	William Collazo; Raidel Acea; Osmaidel Pellicier; Yoandys Lescay	8	0.179	3:00.70	GR
2nd place, silver medalist(s)	Venezuela	Alberto Aguilar; Alberth Bravo; José Meléndez; Freddy Mezones	4	0.323	3:01.80	
3rd place, bronze medalist(s)	Colombia	Bernardo Baloyes; Carlos Lemos; Diego Palomeque; Rafith Rodríguez	3	0.314	3:02.52	SB
4	Dominican Republic	Yon Soriano; Juander Santos; Joel Mejía; Luguelín Santos	7	0.307	3:02.86	
5	Costa Rica	Nery Brenes; David Hodgson; Gary Robinson; Gerald Drummond	2	0.203	3:08.02	SB
6	Jamaica	Nassive Powell; Kegan Campbell; Marzel Miller; Andre Clarke	6	0.237	3:11.01	
7	Mexico	Pablo Orduña; José de Jesús Fraire; Edgar Elias; Diego Moreno	5	0.248	3:12.85	

=== 20 kilometers walk ===
Final – 23 November 13:05

Rank	Name	Nationality	Time	Notes
1st place, gold medalist(s)	Horacio Nava	Mexico	1:25:05	
2nd place, silver medalist(s)	Éider Arévalo	Colombia	1:26:03	
3rd place, bronze medalist(s)	José Leonardo Montaña	Colombia	1:27:30	
4	Richard Vargas	Venezuela	1:32:13	
5	Gabriel Calvo	Costa Rica	1:32:57	
6	Pedro Daniel Gómez	Mexico	1:40:45	
7	Aníbal Paau	Guatemala	1:50:26	
	Erick Bernabé Barrondo	Guatemala	DSQ	R 230.6

=== 50 kilometers walk ===
Final – 29 November 13:05

Rank	Name	Nationality	Time	Notes
1st place, gold medalist(s)	Erick Bernabé Barrondo	Guatemala	3:49:40	GR
2nd place, silver medalist(s)	Omar Zepeda	Mexico	3:52:45	
3rd place, bronze medalist(s)	Cristián David Berdeja	Mexico	3:53:39	SB
4	Jaime Quiyuch	Guatemala	3:55:42	
5	Jorge Armando Ruiz	Colombia	3:59:45	
6	Luis Ángel López	Puerto Rico	4:16:00	
7	Yerenman Salazar	Venezuela	4:31:46	
	James Rendón	Colombia	DNF	
	Allan Segura	Costa Rica	DNF	

=== High jump ===
Final – 27 November 10:40 – Temperature: 15 °C – Humidity: 65%

Rank	Name	Nationality	Attempts									Result	Notes
Rank	Name	Nationality	1.90	2.05	2.10	2.15	2.18	2.21	2.24	2.26	2.28	Result	Notes
1st place, gold medalist(s)	Sergio Mestre	Cuba	–	–	O	O	XO	O	XO	XXO	XXX	2.26	PB
2nd place, silver medalist(s)	Eure Yánez	Venezuela	–	–	O	XO	–	XX-	O	XXX		2.24	
3rd place, bronze medalist(s)	Ryan Ingraham	Bahamas	–	–	O	O	–	O	XO	XXX		2.24	
4	Edgar Alejandro Rivera	Mexico	–	–	O	O	–	XXO	X-	XX		2.21	
5	Jamal Wilson	Bahamas	–	–	O	O	XO	XXX				2.18	
6	Alexander Bowen	Panama	–	O	O	XXO	XXX					2.15	
7	Raudelys Rodríguez	Cuba	–	–	O	XXX						2.10	
8	Henry Edmond	Panama	–	XXO	O	XXX						2.10	
9	José Humberto Arreola	Mexico	–	O	XXO	XXX						2.10	
10	Luis Joel Castro	Puerto Rico	–	O	–	Xr						2.05	
11	Ronald Edyberto Ramírez	Guatemala	O	XO	XXX							2.05	SB

=== Pole vault ===
Final – 28 November 10:40 – Temperature: 14 °C – Humidity: 76%

Rank	Name	Nationality	Attempts										Result	Notes
Rank	Name	Nationality	4.40	4.60	4.75	4.90	5.00	5.10	5.20	5.30	5.35	5.50	Result	Notes
1st place, gold medalist(s)	Lázaro Borges	Cuba	–	–	–	–	–	XO	–	O	–	XXX	5.30	
2nd place, silver medalist(s)	Yankier Lara	Cuba	–	–	–	–	XO	XO	–	X-	XX		5.10	
3rd place, bronze medalist(s)	Raúl Alejandro Ríos	Mexico	–	–	O	O	O	XXX					5.00	
4	Walter Viáfara	Colombia	–	–	–	O	XXO	XXX					5.00	
5	Víctor Manuel Castillero	Mexico	–	–	XXO	O	XX-	X					4.90	
6	Pedro Daniel Figueroa	El Salvador	XO	XXX									4.40	
	Jorge Montes	Dominican Republic	–	XXX									NH	
	Rick Valcin	Saint Lucia	–	–	Xr								DNF	

=== Long jump ===
Final – 26 November 13:30 – Temperature: 16 °C – Humidity: 74%

Rank	Name	Nationality	Attempts						Result	Notes
Rank	Name	Nationality	1	2	3	4	5	6	Result	Notes
1st place, gold medalist(s)	David Registe	Dominica	6.73 (-0.4 m/s)	7.46 (+0.4 m/s)	7.55 (-1.3 m/s)	7.46 (-1.2 m/s)	X (-0.1 m/s)	7.79 (-0.2 m/s)	7.79 (-0.2 m/s)	
2nd place, silver medalist(s)	Muhammad Taqi Abdul-Halim	U.S. Virgin Islands	X (+0.2 m/s)	X (-0.3 m/s)	7.64 (-0.5 m/s)	7.75 (-0.6 m/s)	7.38 (-1.4 m/s)	7.43 (-0.5 m/s)	7.75 (-0.6 m/s)	
3rd place, bronze medalist(s)	Yunior Díaz	Cuba	X (-1.0 m/s)	7.66 (-0.9 m/s)	X (+0.3 m/s)	7.57 (-0.2 m/s)	7.55 (-1.2 m/s)	7.26 (+0.4 m/s)	7.66 (-0.9 m/s)	
4	Raymond Higgs	Bahamas	7.48 (-0.5 m/s)	7.63 (-0.5 m/s)	X (-0.9 m/s)	7.61 (-1.8 m/s)	7.26 (-1.4 m/s)	7.53 (-0.5 m/s)	7.63 (-0.5 m/s)	
5	Jhamal Bowen	Panama	7.40 (-0.2 m/s)	7.31 (-2.1 m/s)	7.42 (-0.7 m/s)	7.53 (+0.3 m/s)	7.55 (+0.3 m/s)	7.37 (-2.5 m/s)	7.55 (+0.3 m/s)	
6	Edwin Murillo	Colombia	7.37 (-1.7 m/s)	7.52 (-1.0 m/s)	X (-0.5 m/s)	7.46 (-1.5 m/s)	X (-0.5 m/s)	X (-0.7 m/s)	7.52 (-1.0 m/s)	SB
7	Quincy Breell	Aruba	7.34 (-0.6 m/s)	7.28 (0.0 m/s)	7.41 (-0.3 m/s)	7.29 (-0.6 m/s)	7.44 (-1.2 m/s)	6.86 (-0.8 m/s)	7.44 (-1.2 m/s)	
8	Leon Hunt	U.S. Virgin Islands	7.43 (-0.5 m/s)	7.25 (-0.9 m/s)	X (-0.2 m/s)	X (+0.4 m/s)	X (-0.8 m/s)	X (-1.1 m/s)	7.43 (-0.5 m/s)	
9	Alberto Álvarez	Mexico	7.28 (-0.8 m/s)	7.39 (-2.9 m/s)	7.33 (-1.6 m/s)				7.39 (-2.9 m/s)	
10	Alain Sotolongo	Cuba	7.23 (-0.4 m/s)	X (0.0 m/s)	7.10 (-1.3 m/s)				7.23 (-0.4 m/s)	
11	Tyrone Smith	Bermuda	X (+0.1 m/s)	7.17 (-1.5 m/s)	7.14 (-0.2 m/s)				7.17 (-1.5 m/s)	
12	Jair David Cadenas	Mexico	6.90 (-0.5 m/s)	6.91 (-1.5 m/s)	7.04 (-0.6 m/s)				7.04 (-0.6 m/s)	
13	Aubrey Allen	Jamaica	7.03 (-0.2 m/s)	4.68 (-0.5 m/s)	6.88 (+0.3 m/s)				7.03 (-0.2 m/s)	
14	Eddy Florián	Dominican Republic	7.01 (-1.3 m/s)	X (-0.7 m/s)	X (-0.3 m/s)				7.01 (-1.3 m/s)	
15	Miguel Louis	Saint Lucia	6.96 (-1.5 m/s)	X (-0.5 m/s)	X (+0.1 m/s)				6.96 (-1.5 m/s)	
16	Brandon Jones	Belize	X (+0.5 m/s)	6.86 (-1.1 m/s)	6.69 (-0.2 m/s)				6.86 (-1.1 m/s)	
17	Alfredo Smith	Bahamas	X (-0.6 m/s)	X (-0.8 m/s)	6.59 (+2.0 m/s)				6.59 (+2.0 m/s)	
	Carlos Morgan	Cayman Islands							DNS	

=== Triple jump ===
Final – 28 November 10:00 – Temperature: 14 °C – Humidity: 76%

Rank	Name	Nationality	Attempts						Result	Notes
Rank	Name	Nationality	1	2	3	4	5	6	Result	Notes
1st place, gold medalist(s)	Ernesto Revé	Cuba	16.94 (-0.1 m/s)	16.81 (-1.0 m/s)	X (-1.2 m/s)	16.75 (-0.8 m/s)	16.72 (+0.1 m/s)	X (-0.8 m/s)	16.94 (-0.1 m/s)	
2nd place, silver medalist(s)	Lázaro Martínez	Cuba	16.91 (-0.6 m/s)	16.75 (+0.7 m/s)	16.76 (+0.9 m/s)	16.36 (-0.3 m/s)	16.78 (-0.4 m/s)	15.48 (-2.0 m/s)	16.91 (-0.6 m/s)	
3rd place, bronze medalist(s)	Yordanys Durañona	Dominica	16.43 (+0.3 m/s)	16.67 (-0.4 m/s)	16.53 (+0.6 m/s)	14.77 (-0.7 m/s)	X (-0.5 m/s)	16.64 (-1.5 m/s)	16.67 (-0.4 m/s)	
4	Alberto Álvarez	Mexico	15.84 (-1.0 m/s)	15.44 (-0.3 m/s)	15.87 (-0.4 m/s)	15.79 (-0.6 m/s)	15.94 (-1.3 m/s)	16.32 (+0.1 m/s)	16.32 (+0.1 m/s)	
5	Jhon Murillo	Colombia	15.46 (-0.8 m/s)	16.04 (-1.6 m/s)	15.60 (+1.1 m/s)	16.19 (-0.5 m/s)	X (-0.8 m/s)	X (+0.8 m/s)	16.19 (-0.5 m/s)	
6	Samyr Lainé	Haiti	16.08 (-0.8 m/s)	15.85 (+0.8 m/s)	X (+0.7 m/s)	X (-1.4 m/s)	14.47 (-0.1 m/s)	X (0.0 m/s)	16.08 (-0.8 m/s)	
7	Hasheem Abdul-Halim	U.S. Virgin Islands	X (-0.8 m/s)	X (-1.0 m/s)	15.54 (-1.6 m/s)	X (-1.5 m/s)	X (-0.2 m/s)	X (+1.0 m/s)	15.54 (-1.6 m/s)	SB
8	Muhammad Taqi Abdul-Halim	U.S. Virgin Islands	15.45 (-1.2 m/s)	X (+0.7 m/s)	X (+0.2 m/s)	–	r		15.45 (-1.2 m/s)	
9	Lathone Collie-Minns	Bahamas	13.35 (-0.7 m/s)	15.18 (+0.7 m/s)	X (+0.2 m/s)				15.18 (+0.7 m/s)	
10	Aubrey Allen	Jamaica	15.13 (-0.5 m/s)	X (0.0 m/s)	14.72 (-0.4 m/s)				15.13 (-0.5 m/s)	
11	Brandon Jones	Belize	14.70 (-0.8 m/s)	14.83 (-0.9 m/s)	X (-0.8 m/s)				14.83 (-0.9 m/s)	
12	Jair David Cadenas	Mexico	X (+0.6 m/s)	14.09 (+0.4 m/s)	14.62 (+0.9 m/s)				14.62 (+0.9 m/s)	
	Eddy Florián	Dominican Republic	X (-1.0 m/s)	r					DNF	

=== Shot put ===
Final – 25 November 12:10 – Temperature: 17 °C – Humidity: 88%

Rank	Name	Nationality	Attempts						Result	Notes
Rank	Name	Nationality	1	2	3	4	5	6	Result	Notes
1st place, gold medalist(s)	Mario Cota	Mexico	18.32	X	18.51	18.77	19.18	19.30	19.30	SB
2nd place, silver medalist(s)	Stephen Sáenz	Mexico	18.51	18.52	19.27	18.89	18.73	19.24	19.27	
3rd place, bronze medalist(s)	Raymond Brown	Jamaica	17.70	18.30	17.86	X	17.75	X	18.30	
4	Akeem Stewart	Trinidad and Tobago	X	17.28	X	18.08	X	X	18.08	SB
5	Jorge Yedián Fernández	Cuba	14.56	15.55	X	16.11	X	–	16.11	
6	Quincy Wilson	Trinidad and Tobago	16.11	X	X	15.49	X	–	16.11	
7	Jesús Parejo	Venezuela	15.78	X	15.67	15.87	15.74	16.05	16.05	
8	Delron Innis	Bahamas	14.27	X	X	X	13.35	14.40	14.40	
9	Juan Carlos de la Cruz	Dominican Republic	9.14	–	–				9.14	

=== Discus throw ===
Final – 24 November 11:45 – Temperature: 25 °C – Humidity: 58%

Rank	Name	Nationality	Attempts						Result	Notes
Rank	Name	Nationality	1	2	3	4	5	6	Result	Notes
1st place, gold medalist(s)	Jorge Yedián Fernández	Cuba	63.17	X	X	62.29	X	X	63.17	
2nd place, silver medalist(s)	Mauricio Ortega	Colombia	59.65	60.69	60.27	X	58.55	60.02	60.69	
3rd place, bronze medalist(s)	Mario Cota	Mexico	56.67	54.12	57.14	X	X	58.21	58.21	
4	Quincy Wilson	Trinidad and Tobago	54.72	X	53.89	X	X	54.15	54.72	
5	Jesús Parejo	Venezuela	52.94	X	50.86	53.87	52.85	51.96	53.87	
6	Rafael de Jesús Noh Ek	Mexico	44.44	48.13	48.78	X	47.87	X	48.78	
7	Dion Ward	Saint Kitts and Nevis	34.90	42.68	43.05	X	43.04	37.38	43.05	
8	Delron Innis	Bahamas	X	X	41.24	X	X	X	41.24	

=== Hammer throw ===
Final – 26 November 11:45 – Temperature: 13 °C – Humidity: 77%

Rank	Name	Nationality	Attempts						Result	Notes
Rank	Name	Nationality	1	2	3	4	5	6	Result	Notes
1st place, gold medalist(s)	Roberto Janet	Cuba	73.80	73.81	73.93	X	X	74.11	74.11	
2nd place, silver medalist(s)	Reinier Mejías	Cuba	X	71.76	71.74	71.81	71.73	X	71.81	
3rd place, bronze medalist(s)	Roberto Sawyers	Costa Rica	X	68.08	67.01	X	70.66	X	70.66	
4	Diego del Real	Mexico	66.14	X	X	X	65.98	69.84	69.84	PB
5	Pedro Múñoz	Venezuela	68.52	X	65.09	X	X	X	68.52	
6	Alexis Figueroa	Puerto Rico	63.71	62.95	63.04	63.80	X	64.48	64.48	PB
7	Diego Berríos	Guatemala	X	63.01	X	63.39	X	60.24	63.39	
8	José Armando Gatica	Mexico	56.98	X	58.92	60.10	58.27	58.40	60.10	

=== Javelin throw ===
Final – 28 November 12:25 – Temperature: 16 °C – Humidity: 72%

Rank	Name	Nationality	Attempts						Result	Notes
Rank	Name	Nationality	1	2	3	4	5	6	Result	Notes
1st place, gold medalist(s)	Guillermo Martínez	Cuba	79.01	79.23	76.39	X	X	79.27	79.27	SB
2nd place, silver medalist(s)	Juan José Méndez	Mexico	X	67.58	71.11	72.67	75.27	76.80	76.80	SB
3rd place, bronze medalist(s)	Osmany Laffita	Cuba	X	72.38	X	74.32	74.04	76.28	76.28	PB
4	Jaime Dairon Márquez	Colombia	73.76	75.68	X	72.87	72.12	X	75.68	
5	Arley Ibargüen	Colombia	71.65	73.81	73.59	74.12	74.55	75.56	75.56	SB
6	Carlos Armenta	Mexico	71.50	X	72.04	73.26	72.15	X	73.26	SB
7	Orrin Powell	Jamaica	X	68.62	X	64.72	65.07	65.37	68.62	SB
8	Adrian Williams	Saint Kitts and Nevis	66.87	X	X	62.03	63.74	64.20	66.87	PB
9	Kurt Felix	Grenada	58.55	X	X				58.55	

=== Decathlon ===
Final – 24/25 November

The highest mark recorded in each event is highlighted in yellow

Rank	Name	Nationality	100m	LJ	SP	HJ	400m	110m H	DT	PV	JT	1500m	Points	Notes
1st place, gold medalist(s)	Yordanis García	Cuba	10.71 (-0.5); 926	7.16 (-0.1); 852	15.54 823	2.03 831	48.17 901	14.18 (0.0); 951	36.98 603	4.00 617	60.13 740	4:51.36 610	7854	
2nd place, silver medalist(s)	José Ángel Mendieta	Cuba	11.09 (-0.8); 841	7.24 (-1.4); 871	15.19 801	1.91 723	49.63 832	14.58 (0.0); 901	39.98 664	4.00 617	60.18 741	5:05.99 526	7517	
3rd place, bronze medalist(s)	Román Garibay	Mexico	11.19 (-0.5); 819	6.84 (-0.7); 776	14.47 757	1.82 644	51.98 726	15.57 (0.0); 782	40.19 668	4.20 673	64.33 803	4:53.99 595	7243	
4	Juan Carlos de la Cruz	Dominican Republic	10.91 (-0.5); 881	6.78 (-0.5); 762	14.08 733	1.88 696	49.72 828	14.93 (-0.9); 858	39.62 657	3.90 590	47.98 559	4:50.18 618	7182	
5	Óscar Campos	Venezuela	11.06 (-0.8); 847	7.06 (-0.8); 828	12.86 659	1.76 593	49.03 860	14.94 (0.0); 857	41.02 685	3.90 590	49.38 579	4:41.55 671	7169	
6	Rodrigo Sagaón	Mexico	10.98 (-0.8); 865	6.19 (+0.2); 628	12.58 642	1.79 619	48.06 906	15.59 (0.0); 780	NM 0	4.20 673	51.33 608	4:40.06 680	6401	
7	Adolphus Jones	Saint Kitts and Nevis	11.57 (-0.8); 738	6.69 (-0.3); 741	13.07 672	2.12 915	50.17 807	15.01 (-0.9); 848	40.65 678	NM 0	40.35 447	5:16.37 469	6315	
8	Josué Louis	Haiti	11.13 (-0.5); 832	6.81 (-0.2); 769	12.06 610	2.00 803	51.69 738	14.69 (-0.9); 887	33.79 540	NM 0	46.35 535	5:32.48 387	6101	
9	Gayell Engeso	Suriname	11.42 (-0.5); 769	7.37 (+0.5); 903	12.77 653	1.85 670	56.69 533	15.42 (-0.9); 799	32.13 507	NM 0	46.43 536	5:03.63 539	5909	
	Marcos Sánchez	Puerto Rico	11.18 (-0.8); 821	7.13 (0.0); 845	14.04 731	DNS							DNF	

== Women's results ==
=== 100 meters ===
Heat 1 – 24 November 10:00 – Wind: -0.4 m/s – Temperature: 24 °C – Humidity: 58%

Rank	Name	Nationality	Lane	Reaction time	Time	Notes
1	Andrea Purica	Venezuela	6	0.222	11.45	Q PB
2	Arialis Gandulla	Cuba	8	0.293	11.53	Q
3	LaVerne Jones	U.S. Virgin Islands	2	0.168	11.63	Q
4	Eliecit Palacios	Colombia	1	0.218	11.67	q
5	Fanny Chalas	Dominican Republic	4	0.183	11.83	
6	Tracy Joseph	Costa Rica	7	0.245	11.84	
7	Iza Daniela Flores	Mexico	5	0.233	11.86	
8	Marlena Wesh	Haiti	3	0.173	12.80	

Heat 2 – 24 November 10:07 – Wind: +0.1 m/s

Rank	Name	Nationality	Lane	Reaction time	Time	Notes
1	Nediam Vargas	Venezuela	7	0.188	11.45	Q PB
2	Greter Guillén	Cuba	4	0.167	11.58	Q PB
3	Tahesia Harrigan-Scott	British Virgin Islands	3	0.157	11.60	Q
4	Sharolyn Josephs	Costa Rica	8	0.204	11.75	q
5	Gabriela Santos	Mexico	5	0.244	11.85	
6	Marlenis Mejía	Dominican Republic	2	0.205	12.03	
7	Ruth-Cassandra Hunt	Panama	6	0.150	12.11	

Final – 25 November 14:40 – Wind: +1.5 – Temperature: 16 °C – Humidity: 85%

Rank	Name	Nationality	Lane	Reaction time	Time	Notes
1st place, gold medalist(s)	Andrea Purica	Venezuela	3	0.170	11.29	PB
2nd place, silver medalist(s)	Nediam Vargas	Venezuela	4	0.219	11.43	PB
3rd place, bronze medalist(s)	LaVerne Jones	U.S. Virgin Islands	8	0.162	11.54	
4	Eliecit Palacios	Colombia	1	0.192	11.55	
5	Arialis Gandulla	Cuba	6	0.205	11.55	
6	Greter Guillén	Cuba	5	0.181	11.67	
7	Sharolyn Josephs	Costa Rica	2	0.199	11.78	
8	Tahesia Harrigan-Scott	British Virgin Islands	7	0.150	11.93	

=== 200 meters ===
Heat 1 – 26 November 13:15 – Wind: +0.1 m/s – Temperature: 16 °C – Humidity: 75%

Rank	Name	Nationality	Lane	Reaction time	Time	Notes
1	Nercely Soto	Venezuela	5	0.204	23.14	Q PB
2	Allison Peter	U.S. Virgin Islands	8	0.229	23.77	Q
3	Dulaimi Debora Odelin	Cuba	4	0.260	23.99	Q
4	Shantely Scott	Costa Rica	3	0.184	24.17	q
5	Samantha Curtis	Jamaica	2	0.171	24.27	
6	Darlenis Obregón	Colombia	6	0.235	24.58	
	Isabel Franz	Mexico	7	0.198	DNF	

Heat 2 – 26 November 13:22 – Wind: +1.0 m/s

Rank	Name	Nationality	Lane	Reaction time	Time	Notes
1	Nediam Vargas	Venezuela	3	0.189	23.51	Q PB
2	María Alejandra Idrobo	Colombia	5	0.219	23.67	Q
3	Iza Daniela Flores	Mexico	4	0.237	23.68	Q SB
4	Arialis Gandulla	Cuba	2	0.227	23.73	q
5	Gayon Evans	Jamaica	1	0.203	24.33	
6	Tracy Joseph	Costa Rica	6	0.254	24.42	
7	Ruth-Cassandra Hunt	Panama	8	0.200	24.57	
8	Margarita Manzueta	Dominican Republic	7	0.232	24.71	

Final – 27 November 13:30 – Wind: -1.6 – Temperature: 16 °C – Humidity: 62%

Rank	Name	Nationality	Lane	Reaction time	Time	Notes
1st place, gold medalist(s)	Nercely Soto	Venezuela	6	0.229	23.14	
2nd place, silver medalist(s)	María Alejandra Idrobo	Colombia	5	0.228	23.52	SB
3rd place, bronze medalist(s)	Allison Peter	U.S. Virgin Islands	3	0.181	23.54	
4	Arialis Gandulla	Cuba	2	0.228	23.57	
5	Iza Daniela Flores	Mexico	7	0.221	23.92	
6	Nediam Vargas	Venezuela	4	0.187	24.00	
7	Dulaimi Debora Odelin	Cuba	8	0.254	24.07	
8	Shantely Scott	Costa Rica	1	0.250	24.47	

=== 400 meters ===
Heat 1 – 25 November 13:10 – Temperature: 17 °C – Humidity: 89%

Rank	Name	Nationality	Lane	Reaction time	Time	Notes
1	Daisiuramis Bonne	Cuba	8	0.534	52.88	Q
2	Jennifer Padilla	Colombia	7	0.229	53.70	Q
3	Samantha Curtis	Jamaica	5	0.224	55.24	Q
4	Mariel Espinosa	Mexico	4	0.328	55.85	
5	Emileth Pirela	Venezuela	3	0.295	55.95	
6	Ramona van der Vloot	Suriname	6	0.231	58.35	

Heat 2 – 25 November 13:17

Rank	Name	Nationality	Lane	Reaction time	Time	Notes
1	Lisneidys Inés Veitía	Cuba	6	0.309	52.54	Q SB
2	Nercely Soto	Venezuela	7	0.314	53.29	Q PB
3	Kineke Alexander	Saint Vincent and the Grenadines	3	0.221	53.62	Q
4	Norma González	Colombia	5	0.234	53.83	q SB
5	Rosa Fabián	Dominican Republic	4		54.41	q SB
	Rossana de Jesús Pardenilla	Mexico	8		DSQ	R 163.3

Final – 26 November 14:00 – Temperature: 16 °C – Humidity: 74%

Rank	Name	Nationality	Lane	Reaction time	Time	Notes
1st place, gold medalist(s)	Lisneidys Inés Veitía	Cuba	3	0.300	51.72	SB
2nd place, silver medalist(s)	Daisiuramis Bonne	Cuba	6	0.218	52.49	
3rd place, bronze medalist(s)	Jennifer Padilla	Colombia	5	0.209	52.95	
4	Nercely Soto	Venezuela	4	0.387	53.06	PB
5	Norma González	Colombia	2	0.228	53.67	SB
6	Kineke Alexander	Saint Vincent and the Grenadines	8	0.308	54.21	
7	Rosa Fabián	Dominican Republic	1		54.75	
	Samantha Curtis	Jamaica	7		DNS	

=== 800 meters ===
Final – 25 November 14:15 – Temperature: 16 °C – Humidity: 85%

Rank	Name	Nationality	Lane	Time	Notes
1st place, gold medalist(s)	Rose Mary Almanza	Cuba	4	2:00.79	
2nd place, silver medalist(s)	Cristina Guevara	Mexico	8	2:01.68	SB
3rd place, bronze medalist(s)	Gabriela Medina	Mexico	3	2:02.36	SB
4	Zulley Melissa Torres	Colombia	5	2:04.58	SB
5	Sahily Diago	Cuba	6	2:05.51	
6	Ninfa Barnard	U.S. Virgin Islands	7	2:16.28	
7	Estefani Guzmán	Dominican Republic	2	2:25.89	

=== 1500 meters ===
Final – 27 November 12:55 – Temperature: 16 °C – Humidity: 62%

Rank	Name	Nationality	Time	Notes
1st place, gold medalist(s)	Muriel Coneo	Colombia	4:14.84	GR
2nd place, silver medalist(s)	Cristina Guevara	Mexico	4:16.51	
3rd place, bronze medalist(s)	Adriana Muñoz	Cuba	4:20.50	
4	Arletis Thaureaux	Cuba	4:22.60	
5	Anayelli Navarro	Mexico	4:48.12	
6	Linda McDowall	Saint Vincent and the Grenadines	5:03.57	

=== 5000 meters ===
Final – 26 November 12:25 – Temperature: 16 °C – Humidity: 75%

Rank	Name	Nationality	Time	Notes
1st place, gold medalist(s)	Brenda Flores	Mexico	16:02.64	GR
2nd place, silver medalist(s)	Sandra López	Mexico	16:13.23	
3rd place, bronze medalist(s)	Yudileyvis Castillo	Cuba	16:16.21	SB
4	Beverly Ramos	Puerto Rico	16:24.42	
5	Ángela Figueroa	Colombia	16:38.47	
6	Rolanda Bell	Panama	17:29.20	
7	Elida Hernández	Guatemala	17:50.68	SB

=== 10,000 meters ===
Final – 24 November 12:30 – Temperature: 25 °C – Humidity: 63%

Rank	Name	Nationality	Time	Notes
1st place, gold medalist(s)	Brenda Flores	Mexico	35:54.44	
2nd place, silver medalist(s)	Kathya García	Mexico	36:23.32	
3rd place, bronze medalist(s)	Yudileyvis Castillo	Cuba	36:29.04	
4	Tonya Nero	Trinidad and Tobago	37:58.86	
5	Elida Hernández	Guatemala	38:26.35	
6	Xiomara Barrera	El Salvador	39:53.07	
7	Yelka Mairena	Nicaragua	40:42.70	

=== Marathon ===
Final – 30 November 12:30

Rank	Name	Nationality	Time	Notes
1st place, gold medalist(s)	Margarita Hernández	Mexico	2:41:16	GR
2nd place, silver medalist(s)	Dailín Belmonte	Cuba	2:42:01	SB
3rd place, bronze medalist(s)	Zuleima Amaya	Venezuela	2:42:27	PB
4	Karina Pérez	Mexico	2:44:19	SB
5	Yolymar Pineda	Venezuela	2:45:56	PB
6	Leidy Tobon	Colombia	2:47:03	
7	Gabriela Traña	Costa Rica	2:51:51	
8	Yelka Mairena	Nicaragua	3:07:57	

=== 100 meters hurdles ===
Heat 1 – 25 November 12:40 – Wind: +0.7 m/s – Temperature: 17 °C – Humidity: 92%

Rank	Name	Nationality	Lane	Reaction time	Time	Notes
1	Lina Marcela Flórez	Colombia	4	0.199	13.31	Q
2	Génesis Romero	Venezuela	6	0.189	13.62	Q PB
3	Josanne Lucas	Trinidad and Tobago	8	0.209	13.79	Q
4	Wanettaa Kirby	U.S. Virgin Islands	3	0.196	14.12	
5	Andrea Sánchez	Mexico	7	0.358	14.36	
	Yvette Lewis	Panama	5		DNS	

Heat 2 – 25 November 12:47 – Wind: +0.3 m/s

Rank	Name	Nationality	Lane	Reaction time	Time	Notes
1	Briggite Merlano	Colombia	8	0.183	13.14	Q
2	Kierre Beckles	Barbados	4	0.187	13.51	Q
3	Rujaine Coto	Cuba	5	0.200	13.60	Q
4	Gabriela Santos	Mexico	7	0.220	13.81	q
5	Petra McDonald	Bahamas	3	0.195	13.98	q
6	Vashty Thomas	Panama	6	0.151	14.04	

Final – 26 November 12:55 – Wind: -0.8 – Temperature: 16 °C – Humidity: 75%

Rank	Name	Nationality	Lane	Reaction time	Time	Notes
1st place, gold medalist(s)	Lina Marcela Flórez	Colombia	3	0.154	13.19	
2nd place, silver medalist(s)	Briggite Merlano	Colombia	6	0.195	13.19	
3rd place, bronze medalist(s)	Kierre Beckles	Barbados	4	0.192	13.47	
4	Josanne Lucas	Trinidad and Tobago	8	0.212	13.62	
5	Génesis Romero	Venezuela	5	0.196	13.63	
6	Gabriela Santos	Mexico	2	0.195	13.68	
7	Petra McDonald	Bahamas	1	0.215	14.33	
8	Rujaine Coto	Cuba	7	0.228	21.29	

=== 400 meters hurdles ===
Heat 1 – 24 November 11:15 – Temperature: 25 °C – Humidity: 58%

Rank	Name	Nationality	Lane	Reaction time	Time	Notes
1	Zudikey Rodríguez	Mexico	6	0.544	56.74	Q
2	Magdalena Mendoza	Venezuela	5	0.248	56.87	Q PB
3	Sharolyn Scott	Costa Rica	3	0.216	57.34	Q PB
4	Nairobis Vicet	Cuba	4	0.243	58.65	q PB
5	Diana Taylor	Dominican Republic	7	0.537	59.20	q SB

Heat 2 – 24 November 11:22

Rank	Name	Nationality	Lane	Reaction time	Time	Notes
1	Zurian Hechavarria	Cuba	6	0.275	57.64	Q
2	Natali Brito	Mexico	3	0.273	58.83	Q SB
3	Deiscy Yadira Moreno	Colombia	5	0.272	59.10	Q
4	Katrina Seymour	Bahamas	4	0.172	59.89	

Final – 26 November 15:05 – Temperature: 16 °C – Humidity: 72%

Rank	Name	Nationality	Lane	Reaction time	Time	Notes
1st place, gold medalist(s)	Zudikey Rodríguez	Mexico	3	0.536	56.79	
2nd place, silver medalist(s)	Magdalena Mendoza	Venezuela	4	0.378	57.67	
3rd place, bronze medalist(s)	Zurian Hechavarria	Cuba	5	0.189	57.74	
4	Sharolyn Scott	Costa Rica	7	0.300	57.75	
5	Natali Brito	Mexico	6	0.219	58.90	
6	Deiscy Yadira Moreno	Colombia	8	0.322	59.13	
7	Nairobis Vicet	Cuba	2	0.282	59.80	
8	Diana Taylor	Dominican Republic	1	0.583	1:00.51	

=== 3000 meters steeplechase ===
Final – 28 November 11:45 – Temperature: 15 °C – Humidity: 72%

Rank	Name	Nationality	Time	Notes
1st place, gold medalist(s)	Ángela Figueroa	Colombia	10:05.25	SB
2nd place, silver medalist(s)	Muriel Coneo	Colombia	10:07.94	
3rd place, bronze medalist(s)	Beverly Ramos	Puerto Rico	10:08.39	
4	Ana Cristina Narváez	Mexico	10:11.22	PB
5	Sara Prieto	Mexico	10:39.73	
6	María Mancebo	Dominican Republic	10:48.00	
7	Melinda Martínez	Puerto Rico	10:56.14	

=== 4 × 100 meters relay ===
Final – 28 November 12:15 – Temperature: 16 °C – Humidity: 72%

Rank	Nation	Competitors	Lane	Reaction time	Time	Notes
1st place, gold medalist(s)	Venezuela	Nediam Vargas; Andrea Purica; Nelsibeth Villalobos; Nercely Soto	3	0.184	43.53	NR
2nd place, silver medalist(s)	Colombia	Lina Marcela Flórez; María Alejandra Idrobo; Darlenis Obregón; Eliecit Palacios	5	0.242	44.02	SB
3rd place, bronze medalist(s)	Cuba	Geylis Montes; Arialis Gandulla; Greter Guillén; Dulaimi Debora Odelin	7	0.219	44.19	SB
4	Puerto Rico	Beatriz Cruz; Celiangeli Morales; Genoiska Cancel; Carol Rodríguez	4	0.285	44.33	
5	Dominican Republic	María Luisa Rodríguez; Margarita Manzueta; Marlenis Mejía; Fanny Chalas	8	0.158	44.68	
6	Mexico	Mayra Hermosillo; Gabriela Santos; María del Consuelo Zamora; Iza Daniela Flores	6	0.230	45.36	SB
7	Costa Rica	Sharolyn Josephs; Shantely Scott; Desire Bermúdez; Tracy Joseph	2	0.307	46.09	SB

=== 4 × 400 meters relay ===
Final – 28 November 13:35 – Temperature: 16 °C – Humidity: 77%

Rank	Nation	Competitors	Lane	Reaction time	Time	Notes
1st place, gold medalist(s)	Cuba	Lisneidys Inés Veitía; Gilda Isbely Casanova; Yameisi Borlot; Daisiuramis Bonne	8	0.402	3:29.69	SB
2nd place, silver medalist(s)	Mexico	Natali Brito; Gabriela Medina; Mariel Espinosa; Zudikey Rodríguez	3	0.283	3:33.16	SB
3rd place, bronze medalist(s)	Colombia	Norma González; Melisa Torres; Jennifer Padilla; Evelis Aguilar	6	0.356	3:34.14	SB
4	Venezuela	Nercely Soto; Magdalena Mendoza; Emileth Pirela; Maryuri Valdez	7	0.613	3:39.08	SB
5	Dominican Republic	Margarita Manzueta; Dianar Taylor; Fanny Chalas; Rosa Fabián	4	0.224	3:41.57	SB
	Costa Rica	Sharolyn Scott; Shantely Scott; Tracy Joseph; Desire Bermúdez	5	0.334	DSQ	R 170.20

=== 20 kilometers walk ===
Final – 23 November 11:45

Rank	Name	Nationality	Time	Notes
1st place, gold medalist(s)	Mirna Ortiz	Guatemala	1:35:43	GR
2nd place, silver medalist(s)	Sandra Arenas	Colombia	1:36:29	
3rd place, bronze medalist(s)	Ingrid Hernández	Colombia	1:37:11	
4	Mónica Equihua	Mexico	1:38:07	
5	Mayra Herrera	Guatemala	1:40:51	
6	Yanelli Caballero	Mexico	1:40:54	
7	Cristina López	El Salvador	1:57:00	
	Glenda Úbeda	Nicaragua	DNF	

=== High jump ===
Final – 26 November 13:00 – Temperature: 16 °C – Humidity: 75%

Rank	Name	Nationality	Attempts									Result	Notes
Rank	Name	Nationality	1.60	1.65	1.70	1.75	1.80	1.83	1.86	1.89	1.92	Result	Notes
1st place, gold medalist(s)	Levern Spencer	Saint Lucia	–	–	–	–	O	O	–	XO	XXX	1.89	
2nd place, silver medalist(s)	Priscilla Frederick	Antigua and Barbuda	–	–	O	O	O	O	XXX			1.83	
3rd place, bronze medalist(s)	Kashany Ríos	Panama	–	–	O	O	O	XXX				1.80	
4	Fabiola Ayala	Mexico	–	–	O	XXO	XO	XXX				1.80	SB
5	Dianellis Dutil	Cuba	–	–	O	O	XXX					1.75	
5	Lesyanis Mayor	Cuba	–	–	O	O	XXX					1.75	
7	Diana Guadalupe González	Mexico	–	XO	XO	XXO	XXX					1.75	
8	Ashleigh Nalty	Cayman Islands	XO	XXO	XXO	XXX						1.70	

=== Pole vault ===
Final – 24 November 13:30 – Temperature: 25 °C – Humidity: 63%

Rank	Name	Nationality	Attempts														Result	Notes
Rank	Name	Nationality	3.30	3.45	3.60	3.75	3.90	4.00	4.10	4.15	4.20	4.25	4.30	4.50	4.60	4.70	Result	Notes
1st place, gold medalist(s)	Yarisley Silva	Cuba	–	–	–	–	–	–	O	–	O	–	O	XXO	XXO	X-	4.60	GR
2nd place, silver medalist(s)	Diamara Planell	Puerto Rico	–	–	–	O	O	O	O	O	X-	X-	X				4.15	
3rd place, bronze medalist(s)	Robeilys Peinado	Venezuela	–	–	–	–	–	XXO	–	O	–	–	XXX				4.15	PB
4	Alexandra González	Puerto Rico	–	–	–	O	O	O	XXX								4.00	
5	Tiziana Ruíz	Mexico	–	–	O	O	XO	XXX									3.90	
6	Carmelita Correa	Mexico	–	–	–	XO	XXX										3.75	
7	Andrea Velasco	El Salvador	O	XXX													3.30	

=== Long jump ===
Final – 25 November 12:00 – Temperature: 17 °C – Humidity: 88%

Rank	Name	Nationality	Attempts						Result	Notes
Rank	Name	Nationality	1	2	3	4	5	6	Result	Notes
1st place, gold medalist(s)	Chantel Malone	British Virgin Islands	6.19 (+0.4 m/s)	6.11 (+0.2 m/s)	6.46 (-0.3 m/s)	6.37 (+0.7 m/s)	6.30 (+0.4 m/s)	–	6.46 (-0.3 m/s)	
2nd place, silver medalist(s)	Irisdaymi Herrera	Cuba	6.32 (-0.7 m/s)	X (-0.7 m/s)	6.27 (+0.6 m/s)	X (+0.7 m/s)	6.07 (+1.4 m/s)	6.36 (+0.9 m/s)	6.36 (+0.9 m/s)	
3rd place, bronze medalist(s)	Zoila Flores	Mexico	6.00 (0.0 m/s)	6.26 (+1.0 m/s)	5.95 (0.0 m/s)	X (0.0 m/s)	6.14 (+0.7 m/s)	X (+0.3 m/s)	6.26 (+1.0 m/s)	SB
4	Yulimar Rojas	Venezuela	6.09 (-0.4 m/s)	6.24 (+0.1 m/s)	6.15 (0.0 m/s)	6.09 (+0.6 m/s)	6.18 (+0.7 m/s)	4.07 (+0.1 m/s)	6.24 (+0.1 m/s)	
5	Yosiris Urrutia	Colombia	X (+0.7 m/s)	6.13 (+0.5 m/s)	X (-0.5 m/s)	X (+0.2 m/s)	X (+0.6 m/s)	X (+0.3 m/s)	6.13 (+0.5 m/s)	
6	Elizabeth López	Mexico	X (+1.4 m/s)	5.94 (+0.5 m/s)	5.93 (-0.7 m/s)	X (+0.4 m/s)	X (+0.7 m/s)	5.74 (-0.8 m/s)	5.94 (+0.5 m/s)	
7	Vashti Thomas	Panama	X (-0.3 m/s)	5.87 (+0.2 m/s)	–	–	–	–	5.87 (+0.2 m/s)	
8	Wanettaa Kirby	U.S. Virgin Islands	5.71 (+0.3 m/s)	5.84 (+0.7 m/s)	5.63 (0.0 m/s)	X (+0.3 m/s)	X (+1.4 m/s)	5.68 (+0.5 m/s)	5.84 (+0.7 m/s)	
9	Paula Beatriz Álvarez	Cuba	X (+0.7 m/s)	X (-0.4 m/s)	5.79 (+0.5 m/s)				5.79 (+0.5 m/s)	

=== Triple jump ===
Final – 27 November 11:30 – Temperature: 16 °C – Humidity: 62%

Rank	Name	Nationality	Attempts						Result	Notes
Rank	Name	Nationality	1	2	3	4	5	6	Result	Notes
1st place, gold medalist(s)	Caterine Ibargüen	Colombia	14.37 (+0.2 m/s)	14.57 (-0.4 m/s)	–	14.21 (-1.4 m/s)	14.11 (-1.3 m/s)	–	14.57 (-0.4 m/s)	GR
2nd place, silver medalist(s)	Dailenis Alcántara	Cuba	14.01 (-2.0 m/s)	14.09 (-0.3 m/s)	–	–	–	–	14.09 (-0.3 m/s)	
3rd place, bronze medalist(s)	Yosiris Urrutia	Colombia	13.48 (-0.6 m/s)	13.71 (-1.3 m/s)	X (-0.7 m/s)	13.87 (-1.2 m/s)	13.55 (-0.5 m/s)	13.89 (+0.3 m/s)	13.89 (+0.3 m/s)	
4	Yulimar Rojas	Venezuela	13.45 (-0.7 m/s)	13.54 (-0.3 m/s)	12.81 (-0.8 m/s)	X (-0.3 m/s)	12.99 (-0.9 m/s)	13.06 (-0.6 m/s)	13.54 (-0.3 m/s)	
5	Liliana Hernández	Mexico	13.50 (+0.1 m/s)	X (+0.3 m/s)	12.94 (-1.5 m/s)	13.20 (-0.5 m/s)	13.28 (-0.9 m/s)	X (+0.9 m/s)	13.50 (+0.1 m/s)	PB
6	Pascale Delaunay	Haiti	X (-0.5 m/s)	13.47 (-1.0 m/s)	X (-2.3 m/s)	X (-0.8 m/s)	12.52 (-1.2 m/s)	12.46 (-1.2 m/s)	13.47 (-1.0 m/s)	PB
7	Ivonne Rangel	Mexico	12.83 (+1.4 m/s)	12.78 (-1.6 m/s)	12.80 (-0.1 m/s)	13.33 (+0.6 m/s)	12.99 (-2.5 m/s)	12.84 (-2.5 m/s)	13.33 (+0.6 m/s)	
8	Ayanna Alexander	Trinidad and Tobago	12.64 (-1.8 m/s)	12.94 (+0.9 m/s)	12.94 (-0.5 m/s)	12.59 (0.0 m/s)	–	–	12.94 (-0.5 m/s)	

=== Shot put ===
Final – 27 November 10:00 – Temperature: 13 °C – Humidity: 65%

Rank	Name	Nationality	Attempts						Result	Notes
Rank	Name	Nationality	1	2	3	4	5	6	Result	Notes
1st place, gold medalist(s)	Cleopatra Borel	Trinidad and Tobago	17.84	18.07	18.38	18.53	18.99	X	18.99	
2nd place, silver medalist(s)	Yaniuvis López	Cuba	17.70	17.49	17.65	17.87	17.88	17.11	17.88	
3rd place, bronze medalist(s)	Sandra Lemos	Colombia	16.98	17.50	X	X	X	X	17.50	SB
4	Saily Viart	Cuba	17.21	16.77	X	X	X	16.88	17.21	PB
5	Laura Pulido	Mexico	14.37	14.85	14.25	14.44	14.41	14.84	14.85	
6	Genneva Greaves	Jamaica	13.70	14.02	14.21	13.95	13.68	13.72	14.21	
7	María Joaquina Salazar	Mexico	13.24	13.53	X	13.71	13.66	X	13.71	

=== Discus throw ===
Final – 26 November 11:30 – Temperature: 14 °C – Humidity: 80%

Rank	Name	Nationality	Attempts						Result	Notes
Rank	Name	Nationality	1	2	3	4	5	6	Result	Notes
1st place, gold medalist(s)	Denia Caballero	Cuba	60.19	X	64.47	X	63.64	64.00	64.47	GR
2nd place, silver medalist(s)	Yaime Pérez	Cuba	62.42	X	58.30	X	60.40	X	62.42	
3rd place, bronze medalist(s)	Johana Martínez	Colombia	55.13	52.50	X	56.27	50.84	X	56.27	SB
4	Paulina Flores	Mexico	50.90	52.50	49.29	X	49.40	50.95	52.50	SB
5	Aixa Middleton	Panama	X	51.59	X	42.27	48.91	47.97	51.59	
6	Tara-Sue Barnett	Jamaica	50.06	X	X	X	X	50.65	50.65	
7	Irais Estrada	Mexico	50.57	X	49.88	47.49	47.92	X	50.57	
8	Vanessa Levy	Jamaica	X	45.82	46.72	X	45.57	47.22	47.22	

=== Hammer throw ===
Final – 24 November 11:30 – Temperature: 23 °C – Humidity: 54%

Rank	Name	Nationality	Attempts						Result	Notes
Rank	Name	Nationality	1	2	3	4	5	6	Result	Notes
1st place, gold medalist(s)	Yipsi Moreno	Cuba	68.83	X	66.33	X	71.35	X	71.35	GR
2nd place, silver medalist(s)	Yurisleydi Ford	Cuba	68.64	68.99	X	68.70	69.62	67.71	69.62	
3rd place, bronze medalist(s)	Eli Yohana Moreno	Colombia	64.99	65.69	67.22	67.77	66.11	63.38	67.77	SB
4	Rosa Rodríguez	Venezuela	64.76	X	67.47	X	X	X	67.47	PB
5	Natalie Grant	Jamaica	X	47.29	50.99	53.23	X	54.23	54.23	
6	Judith Margarita Alvarado	Mexico	50.29	53.83	X	49.49	51.89	50.83	53.83	SB
7	Araceli Ibarra	Mexico	X	50.21	51.92	51.87	50.79	52.37	52.37	SB
8	Vanessa Levy	Jamaica	X	51.56	49.78	50.26	X	X	51.56	

=== Javelin throw ===
Final – 27 November 12:25 – Temperature: 16 °C – Humidity: 62%

Rank	Name	Nationality	Attempts						Result	Notes
Rank	Name	Nationality	1	2	3	4	5	6	Result	Notes
1st place, gold medalist(s)	Flor Ruiz	Colombia	59.71	54.08	54.78	58.51	63.80	–	63.80	GR, AR
2nd place, silver medalist(s)	Abigail Gómez	Mexico	52.90	53.49	54.63	53.30	57.28	X	57.28	PB
3rd place, bronze medalist(s)	Coralys Ortiz	Puerto Rico	X	54.53	X	50.20	49.97	X	54.53	
4	Yulennis Aguilar	Cuba	46.60	46.72	47.72	53.59	X	54.50	54.50	PB
5	María Lucelly Murillo	Colombia	X	X	53.06	X	X	X	53.06	
6	Lismania Muñoz	Cuba	X	50.11	50.33	52.41	52.91	52.38	52.91	
7	María Alejandra Figueroa	Mexico	45.27	44.08	44.34	44.04	X	44.97	45.27	
	Milagros Montes de Oca	Dominican Republic	DNS							

=== Heptathlon ===
Final – 26/27 November

The highest mark recorded in each event is highlighted in yellow

Rank	Name	Nationality	100m H	HJ	SP	200m	LJ	JT	800m	Points	Notes
1st place, gold medalist(s)	Yorgelis Rodríguez	Cuba	13.82 (-0.3); 1004	1.85 1041	13.50 761	24.78 (+0.2); 907	6.16 (-1.5); 899	39.29 654	2:28.00 718	5984	GR
2nd place, silver medalist(s)	Yusleidys Mendieta	Cuba	13.77 (-0.2); 1011	1.67 818	13.43 756	24.32 (-1.7); 950	5.82 (-1.0); 795	45.40 771	2:28.04 718	5819	
3rd place, bronze medalist(s)	Alysbeth Felix	Puerto Rico	14.27 (-0.2); 941	1.79 966	10.32 550	24.79 (+0.2); 906	6.33 (-0.4); 953	37.93 628	2:23.45 777	5721	SB
4	Jessamyn Sauceda	Mexico	14.22 (-0.3); 947	1.70 855	11.69 641	25.20 (+0.2); 869	6.16 (-0.5); 899	38.54 639	2:25.06 756	5606	SB
5	Guillercy González	Venezuela	14.50 (-0.2); 909	1.76 928	12.14 670	26.14 (-1.7); 785	5.77 (-0.8); 780	41.17 690	2:28.94 706	5468	PB
6	Milagros Montes de Oca	Dominican Republic	14.45 (-0.3); 916	1.67 818	11.74 644	25.72 (-1.7); 822	5.72 (-0.5); 765	40.18 671	2:20.92 811	5447	
7	Chrystal Ruíz	Mexico	14.58 (-0.2); 898	1.64 783	9.71 510	26.20 (-1.7); 780	5.83 (-0.8); 798	32.95 533	2:19.37 832	5134	
8	Shianne Smith	Bermuda	14.80 (-0.3); 868	1.55 678	11.28 614	25.08 (+0.2); 879	5.48 (-0.7); 694	37.67 623	2:24.57 762	5118	
9	Katy Sealy	Belize	15.66 (-0.3); 756	1.64 783	10.96 592	26.96 (+0.2); 715	5.26 (-0.1); 631	35.16 575	2:34.96 632	4684	PB
