= Athletics at the 2010 South American Games – Men's 3,000 metre steeplechase =

The Men's 3,000m Steeplechase event at the 2010 South American Games was held on March 23 at 18:20.

== Medalists ==
Gold	Silver	Bronze
Marvin Blanco; Venezuela	Luis Orta; Venezuela	Mauricio Valdivia; Chile

== Records ==
Standing records prior to the 2010 South American Games
World record	Saif Saaeed Shaheen	Qatar	7:53.63	Brussels, Belgium	3 September 2004
World Leading	Ruben Ramolefi	South Africa	8:25.50	Durban, South Africa	26 February 2010
South American record	Wander do Prado Moura	Brazil	8:14.41	Mar del Plata, Argentina	22 March 1995
South American U23 record	Mario Bazán	(Peru) Perú	8:28.67	Berlin, Germany	16 August 2009

== Results ==
Results were published.

Rank	Athlete	Nationality	Result	Notes
1st place, gold medalist(s)	Marvin Blanco	Venezuela	9:11.63	
2nd place, silver medalist(s)	Luis Orta	Venezuela	9:13.54	SB
3rd place, bronze medalist(s)	Mauricio Valdivia	Chile	9:20.58	
4	Jorge Luis Arias	Ecuador	9:22.47	
5	Jean Machado	Brazil	9:29.28	
6	Duvilson Amesquita	Colombia	9:29.30	
7	Javier Contreras	Chile	9:38.52	
8	Valdison das Neves Silva	Brazil	9:43.85	
9	Matías Schiel	Argentina	10:16.82	
	Eduardo Gregorio	Uruguay	DNS	

Intermediate times:

1000m	2:57.57	Jorge Luis Arias (ECU)
2000m	6:09.94	Jean Machado (BRA)

== See also ==
- 2010 South American Under-23 Championships in Athletics
