= Jennifer Padilla =

Colombian sprinter (born 1990)

Personal information
- Full name: Jenifer Padilla González
- Nationality: Colombian
- Born: 1 January 1990 (age 36) Quibdó, Chocó, Colombia
- Height: 1.85 m (6 ft 1 in)
- Weight: 66 kg (146 lb)

Sport
- Country: Colombia
- Sport: Athletics
- Events: 200 metres; 400 metres; 4×100 metres; 4×400 metres; Mixed relay
Medal record
Representing Colombia
Women's athletics
Pan American Games
Gold medal – first place	2011 Guadalajara	400 m
Bronze medal – third place	2011 Guadalajara	4×100 m relay
Bronze medal – third place	2011 Guadalajara	4×400 m relay
Ibero-American Championships
Silver medal – second place	2024 Cuiabá	4×400 m relay
Central American and Caribbean Games
Bronze medal – third place	2014 Veracruz	400 m
Bronze medal – third place	2014 Veracruz	4×400 m relay
Bronze medal – third place	2018 Barranquilla	4×400 m relay
South American Championships
Gold medal – first place	2023 São Paulo	4×400 m relay
Silver medal – second place	2009 Lima	4×400 m relay
Silver medal – second place	2011 Buenos Aires	400 m
Silver medal – second place	2011 Buenos Aires	4×400 m relay
Bronze medal – third place	2009 Lima	200 m
Bolivarian Games
Gold medal – first place	2009 Sucre	4×400 m relay
Silver medal – second place	2009 Sucre	400 m
- Updated on 17 May 2024

Jennifer Padilla González (also spelled; born 1 January 1990) is a Colombian track and field athlete who competes in the 200 metres and 400 metres sprint events. Her first name is also spelled Yenifer of Yennifer.

She won the 400 m title at the 2011 Pan American Games as well as two bronze medals in the relay for Colombia. She set her 400 m personal best of 51.53 seconds at the competition.

Padilla was a medallist in the individual and relay sprinting events at the South American Championships in Athletics in both 2009 and 2011. She jointly holds the national records for the 4×400 metres with a time of 3:29.94 minutes.

== Career ==
Born in Quibdó, Chocó Department, she won the Colombian youth title over 200 m in 2007 and made her first international appearances two years later. At the age of nineteen she won her first senior medals, taking the 200 m bronze at the 2009 South American Championships in Athletics and sharing in the 4×400 metres silver with the Colombian team. Although the 2009 South American Junior Athletics Championships was for younger athletes, she repeated the same placings in both the 200 m and 4×100 m relay events. A week later she ran at the 2009 Pan American Junior Championships in Athletics. She came sixth in the 200 m but demonstrated her strength in the 400 metres sprint by winning the gold medal in a time of 53.60 seconds. Her fourth and final international outing of the year came at the 2009 Bolivarian Games and she won the 400 m silver and 400 m relay gold medals.

She began the next season with appearances at the 2010 South American Games, at which she won the 400 m silver medal, came fourth in the 200 m, and ran in both the 100 m and 400 m relay events for Colombia, helping the team to second and first place, respectively. In June she ran at the 2010 Ibero-American Championships in Athletics and claimed the 400 m silver medal behind Cuba's Daisurami Bonne. She was less successful individually at July's 2010 Central American and Caribbean Games, being eliminated in the heats, but she managed to aid Colombia to second place in the 4×400 m relay with Alejandra Idrovo, Darlenis Obregón and Norma González.

Returning to the continental competition, she was the runner-up in both 400 m individual and relay events at the 2011 South American Championships in Athletics. She ran a 400 m personal best of 51.59 seconds in Cali then placed fifth at the competitive 2011 CAC Championships. The high altitude conditions at the 2011 Pan American Games in Guadalajara saw Padilla run a personal best of 51.76 seconds in the heats then another best of 51.53 seconds in the final – a time which brought her the gold medal and made her the first South American woman to win the 400 m Pan American title. She went on to claim two further medals in athletics for Colombia at the games, first helping the 4×100 m relay team to the bronze medal, then anchoring Colombia's 4×400 m relay to a second bronze and a Colombian record mark of 3:29.94 minutes.

She represented her country at the 2012 Summer Olympics, but was disqualified in her heat. She had success at the 2012 South American Under-23 Championships in Athletics, taking the 400 m title, a 100 m relay silver medal, and fourth place in the 200 m.

== Personal bests ==
- 100 m: 11.70 A (wind: NWI) – Medellín, Colombia, 5 March 2010
- 200 m: 23.32 (wind: +0.1 m/s) – Cali, Colombia, November 2015
- 400 m: 51.53 – Guadalajara, Mexico, 26 October 2011

== International competitions ==
Year	Competition	Venue	Position	Event	Notes
Representing Colombia
2006	South American Youth Championships	Caracas, Venezuela	6th	200 m	25.89 (0.0 m/s)
2009	South American Championships	Lima, Peru	3rd	200 m	24.23 (0.0 m/s)
2009	South American Championships	Lima, Peru	2nd	4 × 400 m relay	3:35.83
2009	South American Junior Championships	São Paulo, Brazil	3rd	200 m	24.28 (+0.2 m/s)
2009	South American Junior Championships	São Paulo, Brazil	2nd	400 m	54.17
2009	South American Junior Championships	São Paulo, Brazil	2nd	4 × 100 m relay	46.48
2009	Pan American Junior Championships	Port of Spain, Trinidad and Tobago	6th	200 m	24.43 (+1.3 m/s)
2009	Pan American Junior Championships	Port of Spain, Trinidad and Tobago	1st	400 m	53.60
2009	Bolivarian Games	Sucre, Bolivia	2nd	400 m	53.9 A
2009	Bolivarian Games	Sucre, Bolivia	1st	4 × 400 m relay	3:39.06 A
2010	South American Under-23 Championships / South American Games	Medellín, Colombia	4th	200 m	24.11 (-0.7 m/s)
2010	South American Under-23 Championships / South American Games	Medellín, Colombia	2nd	400 m	54.09
2010	South American Under-23 Championships / South American Games	Medellín, Colombia	2nd	4 × 100 m relay	44.94
2010	South American Under-23 Championships / South American Games	Medellín, Colombia	1st	4 × 400 m relay	3:40.09
2010	Ibero-American Championships	San Fernando, Spain	2nd	400 m	52.68
2010	Ibero-American Championships	San Fernando, Spain	5th	4 × 400 m relay	3:38.94
2010	Central American and Caribbean Games	Mayagüez, Puerto Rico	9th (h)	400 m	54.44
2010	Central American and Caribbean Games	Mayagüez, Puerto Rico	2nd	4 × 400 m relay	3:33.03
2011	South American Championships	Buenos Aires, Argentina	2nd	400 m	52.55
2011	South American Championships	Buenos Aires, Argentina	2nd	4 × 400 m relay	3:37.66
2011	Central American and Caribbean Championships	Mayagüez, Puerto Rico	5th	400 m	52.97
2011	Pan American Games	Guadalajara, Mexico	1st	400 m	51.53
2011	Pan American Games	Guadalajara, Mexico	3rd	4 × 100 m relay	43.44
2011	Pan American Games	Guadalajara, Mexico	3rd	4 × 400 m relay	3:29.94
2012	South American U-23 Championships	São Paulo, Brazil	4th	200 m	23.80 (+1.2 m/s)
2012	South American U-23 Championships	São Paulo, Brazil	1st	400 m	53.12
2012	South American U-23 Championships	São Paulo, Brazil	2nd	4 × 100 m relay	45.66
2013	South American Championships	Cartagena, Colombia	3rd	400 m	54.28
2013	South American Championships	Cartagena, Colombia	2nd	4 × 400 m relay	3:36.29
2013	Bolivarian Games	Trujillo, Peru	2nd	400 m	52.43
2013	Bolivarian Games	Trujillo, Peru	1st	4 × 400 m relay	3:34.35
2014	South American Games	Santiago, Chile	7th	200 m	24.49 (-0.4 m/s)
2014	South American Games	Santiago, Chile	5th	400 m	54.52
2014	South American Games	Santiago, Chile	3rd	4 × 100 m relay	45.13
2014	South American Games	Santiago, Chile	2nd	4 × 400 m relay	3:35.96
2014	Ibero-American Championships	São Paulo, Brazil	2nd	400 m	52.72
2014	Pan American Sports Festival	Mexico City, Mexico	7th	400 m	55.91 A
2014	Central American and Caribbean Games	Xalapa, Mexico	3rd	400 m	52.95 A
2014	Central American and Caribbean Games	Xalapa, Mexico	3rd	4 × 400m relay	3:34.14 A
2015	South American Championships	Lima, Peru	6th (h)	200 m	25.27 (-1.3 m/s)
2015	South American Championships	Lima, Peru	8th	400 m	55.56
2016	Ibero-American Championships	Rio de Janeiro, Brazil	4th	400 m	52.79
2017	World Relays	Nassau, Bahamas	3rd (B)	4 × 400m relay	3:38.02
2017	South American Championships	Asunción, Paraguay	2nd	400 m	52.68
2017	South American Championships	Asunción, Paraguay	2nd	4 × 100 m relay	44.50
2017	South American Championships	Asunción, Paraguay	2nd	4 × 400 m relay	3:33.92
2017	Bolivarian Games	Santa Marta, Colombia	6th (h)	200 m	24.50^{1}
2017	Bolivarian Games	Santa Marta, Colombia	2nd	400 m	53.43
2018	South American Games	Cochabamba, Bolivia	1st	400 m	52.14
2018	South American Games	Cochabamba, Bolivia	1st	4 × 400 m relay	3:31.87
2018	Central American and Caribbean Games	Barranquilla, Colombia	9th (h)	400 m	54.51
2018	Central American and Caribbean Games	Barranquilla, Colombia	3rd	4 × 400 m relay	3:32.61
2019	South American Championships	Lima, Peru	4th	200 m	23.67
2019	South American Championships	Lima, Peru	2nd	4 × 100 m relay	44.97
2019	South American Championships	Lima, Peru	1st	4 × 400 m relay	3:32.81
2019	Pan American Games	Lima, Peru	10th (h)	400 m	53.20
2019	Pan American Games	Lima, Peru	6th	4 × 400 m relay	3:33.02
2021	South American Championships	Guayaquil, Ecuador	3rd	400 m	53.03
2023	South American Championships	São Paulo, Brazil	6th	400 m	54.29
2023	South American Championships	São Paulo, Brazil	1st	4 × 400 m relay	3:31.39
2024	World Relays	Nassau, Bahamas	19th (r)	Mixed relay	3:21.29
2024	Ibero-American Championships	Cuiabá, Brazil	2nd	4 × 400 m relay	3:33.20

^{1}Did not finish in the final
