= Marvin Blanco =

Venezuelan runner (born 1988)

Personal information
- Full name: Marvin Francisco Blanco Bompart
- Born: June 16, 1988 (age 38) Caracas, Venezuela
- Height: 1.69 m (5 ft 7 in)
- Weight: 60 kg (132 lb)

Sport
- Country: Venezuela
- Sport: Athletics
- Event(s): Middle-distance and Cross country running
- Updated on 17 December 2014

Marvin Francisco Blanco Bompart (born 16 June 1988) is a Venezuelan athlete competing in the middle distance and 3000 metres steeplechase events. He has won multiple medals on continental level.

== Competition record ==
Year	Competition	Venue	Position	Event	Notes
Representing Venezuela
2005	World Youth Championships	Marrakesh, Morocco	30th (h)	3000 m	10:26.69
2005	South American Junior Championships	Rosario, Argentina	1st	5000 m	15:01.94
2005	South American Junior Championships	Rosario, Argentina	3rd	10,000 m	31:16.25
2006	South American Cross Country Championships (U20)	Mar del Plata, Argentina	21st	8 km	27:56
2006	World Junior Championships	Beijing, China	18th (h)	3000 m s'chase	9:02.56
2007	South American Cross Country Championships (U20)	Rio de Janeiro, Brazil	7th	8 km	27:25
2007	South American Cross Country Championships (U20)	Rio de Janeiro, Brazil	2nd	8 km (Team)	18 pts
2007	Pan American Junior Championships	São Paulo, Brazil	1st	3000 m s'chase	9:04.38
2007	South American Junior Championships	São Paulo, Brazil	1st	1500 m	3:54.71
2007	South American Junior Championships	São Paulo, Brazil	1st	3000 m s'chase	9:16.75
2008	Ibero-American Championships	Iquique, Chile	–	3000 m s'chase	DQ
2009	World Cross Country Championships	Amman, Jordan	—	12 km	DNF
2010	South American Games / South American U23 Championships	Medellín, Colombia	2nd	1500 m	3:49.65
2010	South American Games / South American U23 Championships	Medellín, Colombia	1st	3000 m s'chase	9:11.63
2010	Ibero-American Championships	San Fernando, Spain	4th	3000 m	8:16.88
2010	Ibero-American Championships	San Fernando, Spain	5th	3000 m s'chase	8:41.40
2010	Central American and Caribbean Games	Mayagüez, Puerto Rico	3rd	3000 m s'chase	9:03.10
2011	South American Championships	Buenos Aires, Argentina	2nd	3000 m s'chase	8:37.02
2011	Military World Games	Rio de Janeiro, Brazil	7th (h)	3000m s'chase	9:09.22
2011	ALBA Games	Barquisimeto, Venezuela	1st	5000m	15:08.61
2011	Pan American Games	Guadalajara, Mexico	5th	3000 m s'chase	8:50.85
2012	Ibero-American Championships	Barquisimeto, Venezuela	1st	5000 m	14:19.89
2012	Ibero-American Championships	Barquisimeto, Venezuela	2nd	3000 m s'chase	8:45.35
2013	Bolivarian Games	Trujillo, Peru	3rd	1500 m	3:50.95
2013	Bolivarian Games	Trujillo, Peru	3rd	3000 m s'chase	8:41.9
2014	Ibero-American Championships	São Paulo, Brazil	1st	1500 m	3:43.88
2014	Ibero-American Championships	São Paulo, Brazil	1st	3000 m s'chase	8:35.87
2014	South American Road Mile Championships	Belém, Brazil	2nd	One mile	4:06
2014	Pan American Sports Festival	Mexico City, Mexico	1st	1500m	3:47.39 A
2014	Pan American Sports Festival	Mexico City, Mexico	1st	3000m s'chase	9:18.44 A
2014	Central American and Caribbean Games	Xalapa, Mexico	5th	1500m	3:48.75 A
2014	Central American and Caribbean Games	Xalapa, Mexico	1st	3000m s'chase	8:43.76 A
2015	Pan American Cross Country Cup	Barranquilla, Colombia	18th	10 km	30:10
2015	Pan American Cross Country Cup	Barranquilla, Colombia	5th	Team - 10 km	108 pts
2015	South American Championships	Lima, Peru	9th	3000 m s'chase	9:12.03
2015	Pan American Games	Toronto, Canada	–	3000 m s'chase	DQ
2015	Pacific 10km Pursuit	Sacramento, California	1st	10,000 m	28:31.14
2017	Bolivarian Games	Santa Marta, Colombia	2nd	5000 m	14:05.90
2017	Bolivarian Games	Santa Marta, Colombia	–	10,000 m	DNF
2018	South American Games	Cochabamba, Bolivia	6th	1500 m	3:58.69
2018	South American Games	Cochabamba, Bolivia	–	3000 m s'chase	DNF
2018	Central American and Caribbean Games	Barranquilla, Colombia	7th	1500 m	3:58.42
2023	Central American and Caribbean Games	San Salvador, El Salvador	5th	5000 m	14:19.67

== Personal bests ==
- 1500 metres – 3:40.56 (Bilbao 2014)
- 3000 metres – 7:58.13 (Belém 2014)
- 5000 metres – 13:53.45 (Eagle Rock 2014)
- 3000 metres steeplechase – 8:21.78 (Huelva 2014)
