= Athletics at the 2010 South American Games – Women's 400 metres =

The Women's 400m event at the 2010 South American Games was held on March 20 at 18:30.

== Medalists ==
Gold	Silver	Bronze
Bárbara de Oliveira; Brazil	Yenifer Padilla; Colombia	Yaneth Largacha; Colombia

== Records ==
Standing records prior to the 2010 South American Games
World record	Marita Koch	East Germany	47.60	Canberra, Australia	6 October 1985
World Leading	Rosemarie Whyte	Jamaica	52.19	Kingston, Jamaica	20 February 2010
South American record	Ximena Restrepo	Colombia	49.64	Barcelona, Spain	5 August 1992
South American U23 record	Ximena Restrepo	Colombia	50.14	Havana, Cuba	5 August 1991

== Results ==
Results were published.

=== Final ===
Rank	Athlete	Nationality	Reaction	Result	Notes
1st place, gold medalist(s)	Bárbara de Oliveira	Brazil	0.211	53.38	
2nd place, silver medalist(s)	Yenifer Padilla	Colombia	0.181	54.09	
3rd place, bronze medalist(s)	Yaneth Largacha	Colombia	0.267	54.22	
4	María Ayelén Diogo	Argentina	0.257	56.11	SB
5	Leslie Arnez	Bolivia		56.13	SB
6	Cristiane dos Santos Silva	Brazil	0.403	56.52	
7	Juliana Menéndez	Argentina	0.292	58.47	
–	Alison Sánchez	Bolivia	0.234	DSQ	^{†}

^{†}: Alison Sánchez from Bolivia was initially 7th in 56.60, but was disqualified, because she was tested positive for nandrolone.

== See also ==
- 2010 South American Under-23 Championships in Athletics
