= Athletics at the 2011 Pan American Games – Women's 400 metres =

Women's 400 metres at the 2011 Pan American Games
- Venue: Telmex Athletics Stadium
- Dates: October 25 – October 26
- Competitors: 14 from 10 nations

Medalists
Gold medal	Jennifer Padilla	Colombia
Silver medal	Daisurami Bonne	Cuba
Bronze medal	Geisa Coutinho	Brazil

The women's 400 metres sprint competition of the athletics events at the 2011 Pan American Games took place between the 24 and 26 of October at the Telmex Athletics Stadium. The defending Pan American Games champion is Ana Guevara of Mexico, who has since retired.

== Records ==
Prior to this competition, the existing world and Pan American Games records were as follows:

World record	Marita Koch (GDR)	47.60	Canberra, Australia	6 October 1985
Pan American Games record	Ana Fidelia Quirot (CUB)	49.61	Havana, Cuba	August 5, 1991

== Qualification ==
Each National Olympic Committee (NOC) was able to enter up to two entrants providing they had met the minimum standard (53.00) in the qualifying period (January 1, 2010 to September 14, 2011).

== Schedule ==
Date	Time	Round
October 25, 2011	16:15	Semifinals
October 26, 2011	17:40	Final

== Results ==
All times shown are in seconds.

KEY:	q	Fastest non-qualifiers	Q	Qualified	NR	National record	PB	Personal best	SB	Seasonal best

=== Semifinals ===
The semifinals were held on October 25. The top three in each heat (Q) and the next two fastest (q) qualified for the final.

Rank	Heat	Name	Nationality	Time	Notes
1	2	Jennifer Padilla	Colombia	51.76	Q
2	2	Daisurami Bonne	Cuba	52.20	Q
3	2	Patricia Hall	Jamaica	52.47	Q
4	2	Geisa Coutinho	Brazil	52.56	q
5	1	Norma González	Colombia	52.67	Q
6	1	Aymée Martínez	Cuba	52.76	Q
7	1	Joelma Sousa	Brazil	52.96	Q
8	1	Raysa Sánchez	Dominican Republic	53.08	q
9	1	Nallely Vela	Mexico	53.29	
10	1	Christian Brennan	Canada	53.34	
11	1	Leslie Cole	United States	53.38	
12	2	Kineke Alexander	Saint Vincent and the Grenadines	53.42	SB
13	2	Jessica Cousins	United States	54.38	
14	2	Kanika Beckles	Grenada	56.43	

=== Final ===
The final was held on October 26.

Rank	Name	Nationality	Time	Notes
1st place, gold medalist(s)	Jennifer Padilla	Colombia	51.53	PB
2nd place, silver medalist(s)	Daisurami Bonne	Cuba	51.69	PB
3rd place, bronze medalist(s)	Geisa Coutinho	Brazil	51.87	
4	Aymée Martínez	Cuba	52.09	
5	Norma González	Colombia	52.18	
6	Joelma Sousa	Brazil	52.34	
7	Patricia Hall	Jamaica	52.69	
8	Raysa Sánchez	Dominican Republic	52.86	
