= Enzo Yáñez =

Chilean long-distance runner

Personal information
- Born: 13 September 1985 (age 40) Valdivia, Chile
- Height: 1.74 m (5 ft 9 in)
- Weight: 63 kg (139 lb)

Sport
- Sport: Track and field
- Event: Marathon

Enzo Yáñez (born 13 September 1985) is a Chilean long-distance runner who specialises in the marathon. He competed in the men's marathon event at the 2016 Summer Olympics.

On 19 March 2017, Yáñez won the Temuco Marathon with a time of 2:18:33, allowing him to qualify to the 2017 World Championships in Athletics.
