= Yolimar Pineda =

Venezuelan long-distance runner

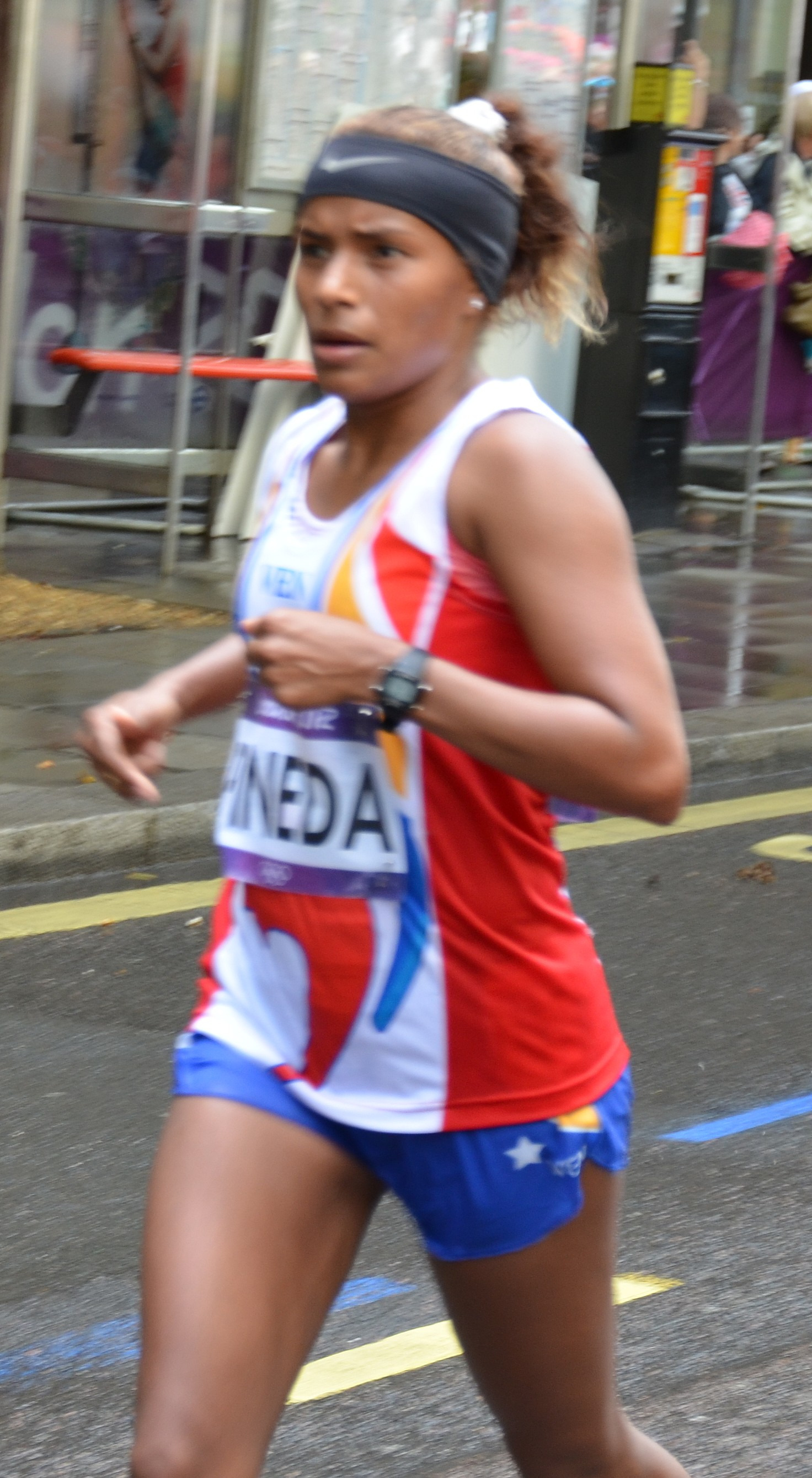
- Pineda in the 2012 Olympic marathon

Personal information
- Full name: Yolimar Elizabeth Pineda Medina
- Born: November 14, 1985 (age 40) Venezuela, Valencia Venezuela
- Education: University of Carabobo
- Height: 1.65 m (5 ft 5 in)
- Weight: 53 kg (117 lb)

Sport
- Country: Venezuela
- Sport: Athletics
- Events: Marathon, half marathon, 10,000 m
- Club: Carabobo Runners Club
- Coached by: Luis Arias

Achievements and titles
- Personal bests: 10,000 m: – 35:08.85 (2005); HM – 1:16:15 (2011); Mar – 2:41:32 (2012)
- Updated on 11 June 2013

Yolimar Elizabeth Pineda Medina (born November 14, 1985) is a Venezuelan long-distance runner. She competed in the marathon at the 2012 and 2016 Olympics and finished 94th and 93rd, respectively.

== International competitions ==
| Year | Competition | Venue | Position | Event | Notes |
Representing Venezuela
| 2004 | South American U23 Championships | Barquisimeto, Venezuela | 8th | 5000m | 18:55.44 |
| 2006 | South American Cross Country Championships | Mar del Plata, Argentina | 13th | Short race 4.0 km | 14:10 min |
| 2006 | South American Cross Country Championships | Mar del Plata, Argentina | 7th | Long race 8.0 km | 28:33 min |
| 2006 | World Cross Country Championships | Fukuoka, Japan | 86th | Long race 8.0 km | 30:13 min |
| 2006 | World Cross Country Championships | Fukuoka, Japan | 14th | Long race 8.0 km – Team | |
| 2007 | ALBA Games | Caracas, Venezuela | 3rd | Half marathon | 1:22:12 hrs |
| 2011 | Ibero-American Marathon Championships | Caracas, Venezuela | 1st | Marathon | 2:50:21 hrs |
| 2011 | Pan American Games | Guadalajara, Mexico | 10th | Marathon | 2:51:58 hrs A |
| 2012 | Olympic Games | London, United Kingdom | 94th | Marathon | 2:45:16 hrs |
