= Luis Fonseca (runner) =

Venezuelan long-distance runner

Personal information
- Full name: Luis Heberto Fonseca
- Born: June 3, 1977 (age 49) Los Hornos, Táchira, Venezuela
- Height: 5 ft 7 in (1.70 m)
- Weight: 128 lb (58 kg)

Sport
- Country: Venezuela
- Sport: Track and field

Achievements and titles
- Olympic finals: 2004; 2008
Medal record
Representing Venezuela
Central American and Caribbean Games
Silver medal – second place	2002 San Salvador	Marathon
- Updated on 26 February 2013

Luis Heberto Fonseca (born June 3, 1977) is a Venezuelan long-distance runner, who twice represented Venezuela in the men's marathon race at the Summer Olympics: in 2004 and 2008. He set his personal best in the men's marathon (2:11:49) on April 15, 2002 in the Boston Marathon.

== Early life and education ==
Fonseca was born on June 3, 1977, in Los Hornos, Táchira, Venezuela.

== Achievements ==
Year	Competition	Venue	Position	Event	Notes
Representing Venezuela
2002	Central American and Caribbean Games	San Salvador, El Salvador	2nd	Marathon	2:20:13
2003	South American Championships	Barquisimeto, Venezuela	3rd	5,000 m	
2003	Pan American Games	Santo Domingo, Dominican Republic	5th	10,000 m	
2003	Pan American Games	Santo Domingo, Dominican Republic	DNF	Marathon	
2004	Olympic Games	Athens, Greece	DNF	Marathon	
2008	Olympic Games	Beijing, PR China	DNF	Marathon	
