= Zuleima Amaya =

Venezuelan marathon runner

Personal information
- Born: 10 June 1985 (age 41) Caracas, Venezuela

Sport
- Sport: Track and field
- Event: Marathon running
Medal record
Representing Venezuela
Central American and Caribbean Games
Bronze medal – third place	2014 Veracrus	Marathon

Zuleima del Carmen Amaya (born 10 June 1985) is a Venezuelan marathon runner. On April 24, 2016 she finished the 5th annual running of the race (out of 10,680 runners) in the 42.2k CAF-Caracas marathon. In 2018 she came in third place (for women) at a time of 1:23:59.
