= Carlos Zamora =

Mexican footballer (born 1996)

Personal information
- Full name: Carlos Alberto Zamora Castellanos
- Date of birth: 14 January 1996 (age 30)
- Place of birth: Guadalajara, Jalisco, Mexico
- Height: 1.84 m (6 ft 1/2 in)
- Position: Centre-back

Senior career*
Years	Team	Apps	(Gls)
2016–2022	Guadalajara	0	(0)
2016–2017	→ Coras (loan)	6	(0)
2018–2019	→ Zacatepec (loan)	21	(1)
2019–2020	→ Tampico Madero (loan)	9	(0)
2020–2021	→ Tapatío (loan)	38	(0)
2022	→ Querétaro (loan)	1	(0)
2023	Tepatitlán	2	(0)
- * Club domestic league appearances and goals

Carlos Alberto Zamora Castellanos (born 14 January 1996) is a Mexican professional footballer who plays as a centre-back for Liga de Expansión MX club Tepatitlán, on loan from Guadalajara.
