= Luis Orta =

Venezuelan long-distance runner

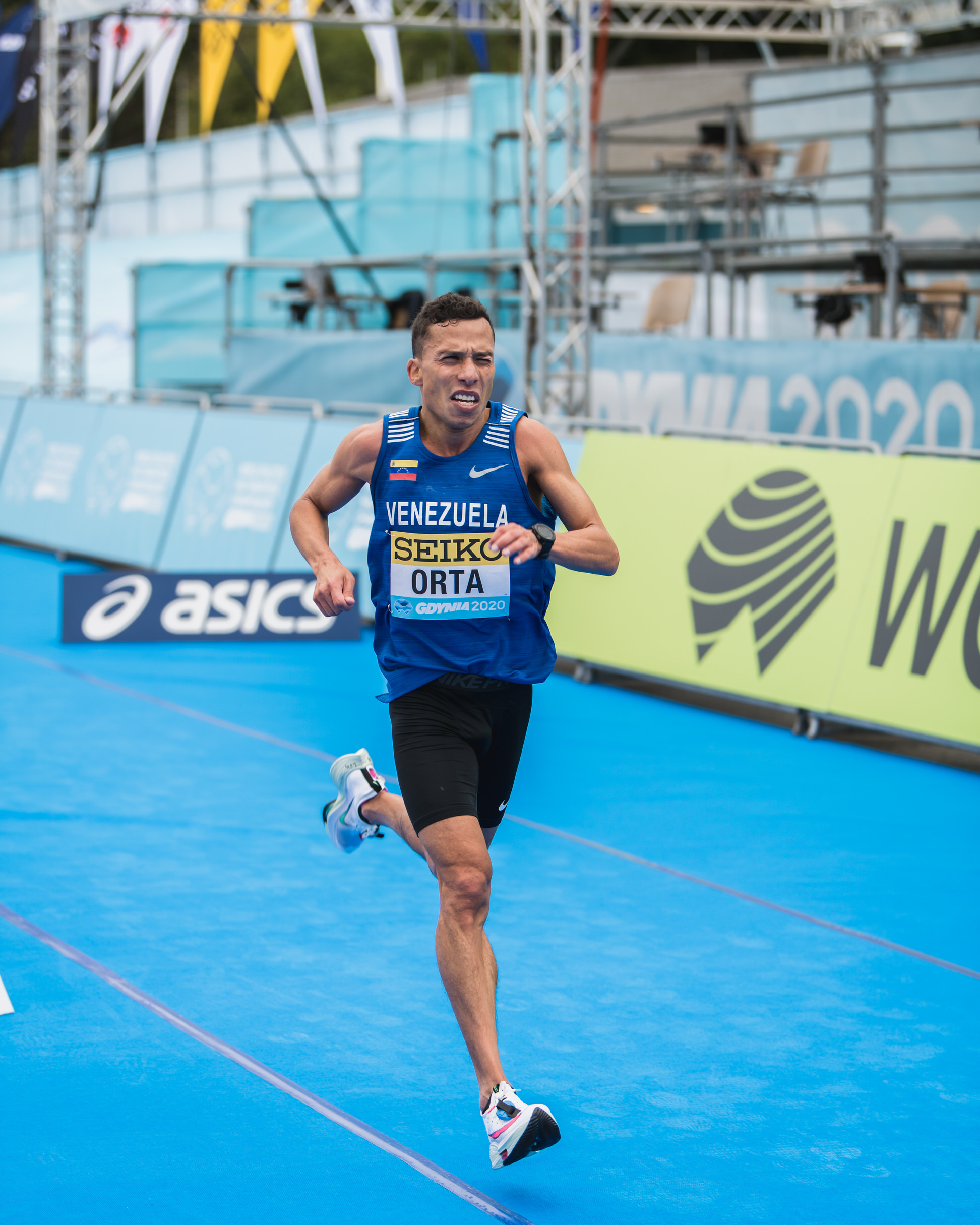
- Luis Orta at the World Athletics Half Marathon Championships 2020 in Poland.

Personal information
- Full name: Luis Alberto Orta Millan
- Born: 15 January 1989 (age 37) Caracas, Venezuela
- Height: 1.65 m (5 ft 5 in)
- Weight: 52 kg (115 lb)

Sport
- Sport: Track and field
- Event: Marathon
- College team: Kentucky Wildcats

Achievements and titles
- Personal best: 5000 meters: 13:49 10,000 meters: 28:39 Half Marathon: 1:03:09 Marathon: 2:15:35

Luis Alberto Orta Millan (born 15 January 1989) is a Venezuelan long-distance runner who specializes in the marathon. He competed in the men's marathon event at the 2016 Summer Olympics. He currently holds two Venezuelan Records: one in the half marathon distance and in the 10 km (road).

== Biography ==
Luis Orta earned a master's degree from the University of Kentucky in sports management and coaching in 2014. After this, he continued to pursue various certifications such as: RRCA Certified Coach in 2017, the Lydiard Certified Coach in 2018, the USATF Certified Coach in 2019 and the Vdot, Jack Daniels Certified Coach in 2020. He currently resides in Boulder, Colorado, where he founded My Olympic Coach LLC., an online training platform for athletes around the world. Orta is married to Sri Lankan-American track and field athlete Hiruni Wijayaratne.

While in college, Orta ran for the Kentucky Wildcats, where he quickly became the team captain and was awarded as Mr. Wildcat or athlete of the year for two years in a row.

Orta qualified for the Summer Olympics in 2016 held in Rio de Janeiro, Brazil, and was able to represent his birth country of Venezuela. In his last chance to qualify, Orta was able to run the marathon Olympic standard at the 2016 Rotterdam Marathon in the Netherlands earlier that year, running only 6 seconds under the standard with a time of 2:18:56. At the Olympics that year, he ran the marathon in a time of 2:27:05 and finished 105th overall.

Since 2018, Orta has posted videos on YouTube documenting his professional career and training. As of January 2025, he has over 100,000 subscribers and his most popular videos have obtained millions of views.

== Competition record ==
Representing Venezuela
World Championships
Year	Competition	Venue	Event
2020	World Athletics Half Marathon Championships	Gdynia, Poland	Half-Marathon
2018	IAAF World Half Marathon Championships	Valencia, Spain	Half-Marathon
2017	World Championships in Athletics	London	Marathon
2014	IAAF World Half Marathon Championships	Copenhagen, Denmark	Half-Marathon
2008	World Junior Championships in Athletics	Bydgoszcz, Poland	3,000m Steeplechase
2007	Kenyan Cross Country Championships	Kenya	8,000m
