= 2019 Asian Athletics Championships – Women's heptathlon =

Women's heptathlon at the 2019 Asian Athletics Championships
- Venue: Khalifa International Stadium
- Location: Doha, Qatar
- Dates: 22-23 April
- Competitors: 9 from 7 nations
- Winning score: 6198 pts WL

Medalists
gold medal	Ekaterina Voronina	Uzbekistan
silver medal	Swapna Barman	India
bronze medal	Wang Qingling	China

The women's heptathlon event at the 2019 Asian Athletics Championships was held on 22 and 23 April.

== Records ==
Records before the 2019 Asian Athletics Championships
Record	Athlete (nation)	Points	Location	Date
World record	Jackie Joyner-Kersee (USA)	7291	Seoul, South Korea	24 September 1998
Asian record	Ghada Shouaa (SYR)	6492	Götzis, Austria	26 May 1996
Championship record	Ghada Shouaa (SYR)	6259	Manila, Philippines	2 December 1993
World leading	No scores recorded			
Asian leading	No scores recorded			

== Results ==
=== 100 metres hurdles ===
Wind:
Heat 1: +0.2 m/s, Heat 2: +0.6 m/s

Rank	Heat	Name	Nationality	Time	Points	Notes
1	1	Meg Hemphill	Japan	13.62	1033	SB
2	2	Wang Qingling	China	13.76	1013	SB
3	1	Purnima Hembram	India	13.79	1008	SB
4	2	Chu Chia-ling	Chinese Taipei	13.88	995	PB
5	2	Swapna Barman	India	14.00	978	SB
6	1	Jeong Yeon-jin	South Korea	14.09	966	SB
7	2	Yuki Yamasaki	Japan	14.12	961	SB
8	1	Irina Velihanova	Turkmenistan	14.44	917	PB
9	1	Shen Muhan	China	14.45	916	SB
10	1	Ekaterina Voronina	Uzbekistan	14.57	899	PB
11	1	Nadiah Al-Haqqan	Kuwait	15.82	736	SB
12	2	Zaina Abdeen	Jordan	16.32	676	SB
	2	Salsabeel Al-Sayyar	Kuwait	DNS	0	
	2	Kenza Sosse	Qatar	DNS	0	
	1	Aleksandra Yurkevskaya	Uzbekistan	DNS	0	

=== High jump ===
Rank	Athlete	Nationality	1.35	1.38	1.41	1.44	1.47	1.50	1.53	1.56	1.59	1.62	1.65	1.68	1.71	1.74	1.77	1.80	1.83	1.86	Result	Points	Notes	Total
1	Swapna Barman	India	–	–	–	–	–	–	–	–	–	–	o	–	o	o	xxo	o	o	xxx	1.83	1016	SB	1994
2	Ekaterina Voronina	Uzbekistan	–	–	–	–	–	–	–	–	–	–	–	o	o	o	o	o	xo	xxx	1.83	1016	=PB	1915
3	Wang Qingling	China	–	–	–	–	–	–	–	o	o	o	xo	xo	xxo	xo	xxx				1.74	903	SB	1916
4	Jeong Yeon-jin	South Korea	–	–	–	–	–	–	–	–	–	o	o	xo	o	xxx					1.71	867	SB	1833
5	Shen Muhan	China	–	–	–	–	–	o	o	o	o	o	xxo	o	xxx						1.68	830	SB	1746
5	Yuki Yamasaki	Japan	–	–	–	–	–	–	–	o	xo	o	xo	o	xxx						1.68	830	SB	1791
7	Purnima Hembram	India	–	–	–	–	–	–	o	o	o	xo	o	xo	xxx						1.68	830	SB	1838
8	Irina Velihanova	Turkmenistan	–	–	–	–	–	–	o	o	o	xo	xo	xo	xxx						1.68	830	PB	1747
9	Meg Hemphill	Japan	–	–	–	–	–	–	o	o	o	o	xo	xxx							1.65	795		1828
10	Chu Chia-ling	Chinese Taipei	–	–	–	–	–	o	–	o	xo	o	xxx								1.62	759	SB	1754
11	Zaina Abdeen	Jordan	o	o	o	o	o	xxo	o	xxx											1.53	655	SB	1331
12	Nadiah Al-Haqqan	Kuwait	o	o	xo	o	xxx														1.44	555	SB	1291

=== Shot put ===
Rank	Athlete	Nationality	#1	#2	#3	Result	Points	Notes	Total
1	Ekaterina Voronina	Uzbekistan	13.02	13.63	13.21	13.63	769	PB	2684
2	Shen Muhan	China	12.80	12.38	11.88	12.80	714	SB	2460
3	Swapna Barman	India	12.34	12.76	12.60	12.76	711	PB	2705
4	Wang Qingling	China	11.76	12.50	11.17	12.50	694	SB	2610
5	Irina Velihanova	Turkmenistan	11.33	12.36	12.16	12.36	685	PB	2432
6	Yuki Yamasaki	Japan	12.27	11.88	11.83	12.27	679	SB	2470
7	Purnima Hembram	India	11.18	11.58	11.19	11.58	633		2471
8	Chu Chia-ling	Chinese Taipei	11.57	x	x	11.57	633	SB	2387
9	Jeong Yeon-jin	South Korea	9.25	10.11	x	10.11	537	SB	2370
10	Zaina Abdeen	Jordan	9.69	9.02	7.65	9.69	509	SB	1840
11	Nadiah Al-Haqqan	Kuwait	9.33	x	x	9.33	486	SB	1777
	Meg Hemphill	Japan				DNS	0		DNF

=== 200 metres ===
Wind:
Heat 1: +1.2 m/s, Heat 2: +1.2 m/s

Rank	Heat	Name	Nationality	Time	Points	Notes	Total
1	2	Wang Qingling	China	24.46	937	SB	3547
2	2	Yuki Yamasaki	Japan	24.88	898	SB	3368
3	2	Ekaterina Voronina	Uzbekistan	24.94	892	PB	3576
4	2	Purnima Hembram	India	25.55	837		3308
5	2	Swapna Barman	India	25.79	816	PB	3521
6	2	Chu Chia-ling	Chinese Taipei	26.07	791	SB	3178
7	2	Shen Muhan	China	26.21	779	SB	3239
8	1	Irina Velihanova	Turkmenistan	26.71	736	PB	3168
9	1	Zaina Abdeen	Jordan	26.87	723	SB	2563
10	2	Jeong Yeon-jin	South Korea	27.68	656	SB	3026
	1	Nadiah Al-Haqqan	Kuwait	DQ	0	R163.3a	1777

=== Long jump ===
Rank	Athlete	Nationality	#1	#2	#3	Result	Points	Notes	Total
1	Swapna Barman	India	5.98	5.94	6.01	6.01	853		4374
2	Purnima Hembram	India	5.99	5.86	5.88	5.99	846		4154
3	Wang Qingling	China	5.93	5.86	x	5.93	828	SB	4375
4	Ekaterina Voronina	Uzbekistan	5.85	x	x	5.85	804	SB	4380
5	Yuki Yamasaki	Japan	5.72	5.77	5.81	5.81	792	SB	4160
6	Chu Chia-ling	Chinese Taipei	5.67	x	5.34	5.67	750	SB	3928
7	Shen Muhan	China	5.53	5.41	x	5.53	709	SB	3948
8	Irina Velihanova	Turkmenistan	5.45	x	x	5.45	686	SB	3854
9	Jeong Yeon-jin	South Korea	x	4.79	5.40	5.40	671		3697
10	Zaina Abdeen	Jordan	x	x	4.71	4.71	482	SB	3045
	Nadiah Al-Haqqan	Kuwait				DNS	0		

=== Javelin throw ===
Rank	Athlete	Nationality	#1	#2	#3	Result	Points	Notes	Total
1	Ekaterina Voronina	Uzbekistan	49.39	53.53	–	53.53	929	PB	5309
2	Swapna Barman	India	44.65	46.83	x	46.83	799		5173
3	Shen Muhan	China	45.28	44.52	42.94	45.28	769	PB	4717
4	Irina Velihanova	Turkmenistan	42.52	42.91	39.24	42.91	723	SB	4577
5	Yuki Yamasaki	Japan	42.87	40.43	41.52	42.87	722	SB	4882
6	Chu Chia-ling	Chinese Taipei	39.92	38.95	42.47	42.47	715	SB	4643
7	Purnima Hembram	India	39.70	37.89	37.14	39.70	662	SB	4816
8	Wang Qingling	China	36.00	38.87	34.32	38.87	646	SB	5021
9	Jeong Yeon-jin	South Korea	x	32.09	x	32.09	516	SB	4213
10	Zaina Abdeen	Jordan	15.67	27.46	20.09	27.46	429	SB	3474

=== 800 metres ===
Rank	Name	Nationality	Time	Points	Notes
1	Ekaterina Voronina	Uzbekistan	2:15.26	889	SB
2	Yuki Yamasaki	Japan	2:16.56	871	
3	Swapna Barman	India	2:20.24	820	SB
4	Wang Qingling	China	2:21.18	808	SB
5	Irina Velihanova	Turkmenistan	2:24.20	767	SB
6	Shen Muhan	China	2:25.58	749	SB
7	Purnima Hembram	India	2:28.48	712	
8	Chu Chia-ling	Chinese Taipei	2:29.15	704	SB
9	Jeong Yeon-jin	South Korea	2:33.68	647	SB
	Zaina Abdeen	Jordan	DNF	0	

=== Final standings ===
The highest mark recorded in each event is highlighted in yellow

Rank	Athlete	Nationality	100m H	HJ	SP	200m	LJ	JT	800m	Points	Notes
1st place, gold medalist(s)	Ekaterina Voronina	Uzbekistan	14.57	1.83	13.63	24.94	5.85	53.53	2:15.26	6198	WL
2nd place, silver medalist(s)	Swapna Barman	India	14.00	1.83	12.76	25.79	6.01	46.83	2:20.24	5993	SB
3rd place, bronze medalist(s)	Wang Qingling	China	13.76	1.74	12.50	24.46	5.93	38.87	2:21.18	5829	SB
4	Yuki Yamasaki	Japan	14.12	1.68	12.27	24.88	5.81	42.87	2:16.56	5753	SB
5	Purnima Hembram	India	13.79	1.68	11.58	25.55	5.99	39.70	2:28.48	5528	
6	Shen Muhan	China	14.45	1.68	12.80	26.21	5.53	45.28	2:25.58	5466	SB
7	Chu Chia-ling	Chinese Taipei	13.88	1.62	11.57	26.07	5.67	42.47	2:29.15	5347	SB
8	Irina Velihanova	Turkmenistan	14.44	1.68	12.36	26.71	5.45	42.91	2:24.20	5344	PB
9	Jeong Yeon-jin	South Korea	14.09	1.71	10.11	27.68	5.40	32.09	2:33.68	4860	SB
10	Zaina Abdeen	Jordan	16.32	1.53	9.69	26.87	4.71	27.46	DNF	3474	SB
	Nadiah Al-Haqqan	Kuwait	15.82	1.44	9.33	DQ	DNS	–	–	DNF	
	Meg Hemphill	Japan	13.62	1.65	DNS	–	–	–	–	DNF	
	Salsabeel Al-Sayyar	Kuwait	DNS	–	–	–	–	–	–	DNS	
	Kenza Sosse	Qatar	DNS	–	–	–	–	–	–	DNS	
	Aleksandra Yurkevskaya	Uzbekistan	DNS	–	–	–	–	–	–	DNS	
