= 2015 Asian Athletics Championships – Women's heptathlon =

The women's heptathlon event at the 2015 Asian Athletics Championships was held on June 3 and 4.

== Medalists ==
Gold	Silver	Bronze
Ekaterina Voronina; Uzbekistan	Liksy Joseph; India	Purnima Hembram; India

== Results ==
=== 100 metres hurdles ===
Wind:
Heat 1: –0.7 m/s, Heat 2: –0.9 m/s

Rank	Heat	Name	Nationality	Time	Points	Notes
1	2	Meg Hemphill	Japan	13.79	1008	
2	1	Purnima Hembram	India	14.21	949	
3	1	Li Weijian	China	14.35	929	
4	2	Wang Qingling	China	14.40	923	
5	2	Sepideh Tavakoli	Iran	14.92	852	
6	2	Liksy Joseph	India	15.05	835	
7	1	Chu Chia-Ling	Chinese Taipei	15.08	831	
8	1	Ekaterina Voronina	Uzbekistan	15.15	822	
9	2	Kristina Pronzhenko	Tajikistan	15.56	769	
10	1	Eri Utsunomiya	Japan	15.83	735	

=== High jump ===
Rank	Athlete	Nationality	1.50	1.53	1.56	1.59	1.62	1.65	1.68	1.71	1.74	1.77	1.80	1.83	Result	Points	Notes	Total
1	Sepideh Tavakoli	Iran	–	–	–	–	–	o	o	o	o	xo	xxo	xxx	1.80	978		1830
2	Ekaterina Voronina	Uzbekistan	–	–	–	–	o	o	o	xo	o	o	xxx		1.77	941		1763
3	Li Weijian	China	–	o	–	o	o	o	xxo	xo	xxx				1.71	867		1796
4	Liksy Joseph	India	–	o	o	o	xxo	o	xxo	xxo	xxx				1.71	867		1702
5	Meg Hemphill	Japan	o	o	o	o	xxo	o	xxx						1.65	795		1803
6	Wang Qingling	China	–	–	o	o	xo	xo	xxx						1.65	795		1718
7	Purnima Hembram	India	o	o	o	xo	xxo	xxx							1.62	759		1708
8	Chu Chia-Ling	Chinese Taipei	–	o	o	o	xxx								1.59	724		1555
9	Kristina Pronzhenko	Tajikistan	o	xxo	xo	xxx									1.56	689		1458
10	Eri Utsunomiya	Japan	o	o	xxx										1.53	655		1390

=== Shot put ===
Rank	Athlete	Nationality	#1	#2	#3	Result	Points	Notes	Total
1	Sepideh Tavakoli	Iran	13.76	13.29	12.76	13.76	778		2608
2	Ekaterina Voronina	Uzbekistan	12.84	12.82	12.30	12.84	717		2480
3	Chu Chia-Ling	Chinese Taipei	11.08	12.51	11.27	12.51	695		2250
4	Wang Qingling	China	11.37	11.54	11.78	11.78	647		2365
5	Li Weijian	China	10.90	10.87	9.30	10.90	589		2385
6	Liksy Joseph	India	10.20	9.47	10.74	10.74	578		2280
7	Eri Utsunomiya	Japan	8.74	10.37	x	10.37	554		1944
8	Purnima Hembram	India	9.87	10.34	10.27	10.34	552		2260
9	Meg Hemphill	Japan	9.82	8.97	x	9.82	518		2321
10	Kristina Pronzhenko	Tajikistan	7.52	7.21	7.29	7.52	368		1826

=== 200 metres ===
Wind:
Heat 1: 0.0 m/s, Heat 2: –0.4 m/s

Rank	Heat	Name	Nationality	Time	Points	Notes	Total
1	2	Liksy Joseph	India	25.18	870		3150
2	1	Purnima Hembram	India	25.27	862		3122
3	2	Meg Hemphill	Japan	25.29	860		3181
4	2	Kristina Pronzhenko	Tajikistan	25.52	840		2666
5	1	Eri Utsunomiya	Japan	25.59	833		2777
6	1	Ekaterina Voronina	Uzbekistan	25.66	827		3307
7	2	Wang Qingling	China	26.06	792		3157
8	1	Li Weijian	China	26.32	769		3154
9	2	Sepideh Tavakoli	Iran	26.47	757		3365
10	1	Chu Chia-Ling	Chinese Taipei	26.72	735		2985

=== Long jump ===
Rank	Athlete	Nationality	#1	#2	#3	Result	Points	Notes	Total
1	Liksy Joseph	India	6.19	6.16	5.89	6.19	908		4058
2	Ekaterina Voronina	Uzbekistan	x	6.02	5.85	6.02	856		4163
3	Li Weijian	China	5.63	x	5.88	5.88	813		3967
4	Meg Hemphill	Japan	5.72	5.77	5.71	5.77	780		3961
5	Purnima Hembram	India	x	5.72	5.73	5.73	768		3890
6	Eri Utsunomiya	Japan	5.32	x	5.66	5.66	747		3524
7	Sepideh Tavakoli	Iran	x	5.60w	5.64	5.64	741		4106
8	Chu Chia-Ling	Chinese Taipei	5.52	5.24	5.64	5.57	720		3705
9	Kristina Pronzhenko	Tajikistan	5.45	5.47	5.39	5.47	691		3357
10	Wang Qingling	China	5.44	–	–	5.44	683		3840

=== Javelin throw ===
Rank	Athlete	Nationality	#1	#2	#3	Result	Points	Notes	Overall
1	Eri Utsunomiya	Japan	40.62	40.33	43.42	43.42	733		4257
2	Purnima Hembram	India	37.33	36.88	43.41	43.41	733		4623
3	Ekaterina Voronina	Uzbekistan	42.48	x	–	42.48	715		4878
4	Chu Chia-Ling	Chinese Taipei	41.57	39.61	40.42	41.57	697		4402
5	Meg Hemphill	Japan	x	x	37.98	37.98	629		4590
6	Sepideh Tavakoli	Iran	35.62	35.95	35.51	35.95	590		4696
7	Liksy Joseph	India	35.12	34.96	35.47	35.47	581		4639
8	Li Weijian	China	31.47	26.78	31.87	31.87	512		4479
9	Kristina Pronzhenko	Tajikistan	26.76	27.87	23.51	27.87	436		3793
10	Wang Qingling	China	25.92	x	x	25.92	400		4240

=== 800 metres ===
Rank	Name	Nationality	Time	Points	Notes
1	Liksy Joseph	India	2:13.44	915	
2	Eri Utsunomiya	Japan	2:13.48	914	
3	Meg Hemphill	Japan	2:14.25	903	
4	Purnima Hembram	India	2:15.35	888	
5	Kristina Pronzhenko	Tajikistan	2:18.46	845	
6	Li Weijian	China	2:20.46	817	
7	Ekaterina Voronina	Uzbekistan	2:20.95	811	
8	Wang Qingling	China	2:25.15	755	
9	Sepideh Tavakoli	Iran	2:25.79	747	
10	Chu Chia-Ling	Chinese Taipei	2:40.01	573	

=== Final standings ===
The highest mark recorded in each event is highlighted in yellow

Rank	Athlete	Nationality	100m H	HJ	SP	200m	LJ	JT	800m	Points	Notes
1st place, gold medalist(s)	Ekaterina Voronina	Uzbekistan	15.15	1.77	12.84	25.66	6.02	42.48	2:20.95	5689	
2nd place, silver medalist(s)	Liksy Joseph	India	15.05	1.71	10.74	25.18	6.19	35.47	2:13.44	5554	
3rd place, bronze medalist(s)	Purnima Hembram	India	14.21	1.62	10.34	25.27	5.73	43.41	2:15.35	5511	
4	Meg Hemphill	Japan	13.79	1.65	9.82	25.29	5.77	37.98	2:14.25	5493	
5	Sepideh Tavakoli	Iran	14.92	1.80	13.76	26.47	5.64	35.95	2:25.79	5443	
6	Li Weijian	China	14.35	1.71	10.90	26.32	5.88	31.87	2:20.46	5296	
7	Eri Utsunomiya	Japan	15.83	1.53	10.37	25.59	5.66	43.42	2:13.48	5171	
8	Wang Qingling	China	14.40	1.65	11.78	26.06	5.44	25.92	2:25.15	4995	
9	Chu Chia-Ling	Chinese Taipei	15.08	1.59	12.51	26.72	5.57	41.57	2:40.01	4975	
10	Kristina Pronzhenko	Tajikistan	15.56	1.56	7.52	25.52	5.47	27.87	2:18.46	4638	
