= Athletics at the 2014 Asian Games – Women's heptathlon =

Women's heptathlon at the 2014 Asian Games
- Venue: Incheon Asiad Main Stadium
- Dates: 28–29 September 2014
- Competitors: 12 from 8 nations

Medalists
gold medal	Ekaterina Voronina	Uzbekistan
silver medal	Wang Qingling	China
bronze medal	Yuliya Tarasova	Uzbekistan

The women's heptathlon event at the 2014 Asian Games was held at the Incheon Asiad Main Stadium, Incheon, South Korea on 28–29 September.

== Schedule ==
All times are Korea Standard Time (UTC+09:00)

Date	Time	Event
Sunday, 28 September 2014	10:00	100 metres hurdles
Sunday, 28 September 2014	10:40	High jump
Sunday, 28 September 2014	18:35	Shot put
Sunday, 28 September 2014	20:30	200 metres
Monday, 29 September 2014	10:00	Long jump
Monday, 29 September 2014	11:40	Javelin throw
Monday, 29 September 2014	18:35	800 metres

== Records ==
Prior to this competition, the existing world, Asian and Games records were as follows.

World Record	Jackie Joyner-Kersee (USA)	7291	Seoul, South Korea	24 September 1988
Asian Record	Ghada Shouaa (SYR)	6942	Götzis, Austria	26 May 1996
Games Record	Ghada Shouaa (SYR)	6360	Hiroshima, Japan	11 October 1994

== Results ==
Legend

- DNF — Did not finish
- DNS — Did not start

=== 100 metres hurdles ===
- Wind – Heat 1: −0.3 m/s
- Wind – Heat 2: −0.5 m/s

Rank	Heat	Athlete	Time	Points	Notes
1	1	Wang Qingling (CHN)	13.68	1024	
2	2	Jeong Yeon-jin (KOR)	14.03	974	
3	1	Wassana Winatho (THA)	14.18	953	
4	2	Huang Yu-ting (TPE)	14.36	928	
5	1	Yuliya Tarasova (UZB)	14.41	921	
6	2	Kotchakorn Khamrueangsri (THA)	14.52	906	
7	2	Sushmitha Singha Roy (IND)	14.67	886	
8	1	Swapna Barman (IND)	14.83	864	
9	1	Sepideh Tavakkoli (IRI)	14.87	859	
10	1	Chu Chia-ling (TPE)	14.96	847	
11	2	Ekaterina Voronina (UZB)	15.19	817	
12	2	Kristina Pronzhenko (TJK)	15.98	717	

=== High jump ===
Rank	Athlete	Attempt										Result	Points	Notes
Rank	Athlete	1.50	1.53	1.56	1.59	1.62	1.65	1.68	1.71	1.74	1.77	Result	Points	Notes
Rank	Athlete	1.80	1.83	1.86								Result	Points	Notes
1	Sepideh Tavakkoli (IRI)	–	–	–	–	–	XO	O	O	O	O	1.83	1016	
1	Sepideh Tavakkoli (IRI)	O	O	XXX								1.83	1016	
2	Ekaterina Voronina (UZB)	–	–	–	–	–	O	O	O	XXO	O	1.83	1016	
2	Ekaterina Voronina (UZB)	XO	O	XXX								1.83	1016	
3	Wang Qingling (CHN)	–	–	O	O	O	O	O	O	O	O	1.77	941	
3	Wang Qingling (CHN)	XXX										1.77	941	
4	Wassana Winatho (THA)	–	–	–	–	O	O	O	O	O	XXX	1.74	903	
5	Swapna Barman (IND)	–	–	O	XO	O	O	XO	XO	O	XXX	1.74	903	
6	Sushmitha Singha Roy (IND)	–	–	O	O	XO	O	XXO	XO	XXX		1.71	867	
7	Yuliya Tarasova (UZB)	–	–	–	O	O	O	O	XXO	XXX		1.71	867	
8	Chu Chia-ling (TPE)	–	–	O	O	O	O	O	XXX			1.68	830	
9	Kotchakorn Khamrueangsri (THA)	–	–	–	O	O	O	XXO	XXX			1.68	830	
10	Jeong Yeon-jin (KOR)	–	–	–	O	XXO	O	XXX				1.65	795	
11	Huang Yu-ting (TPE)	–	XO	O	O	XXO	XXX					1.62	759	
12	Kristina Pronzhenko (TJK)	O	XO	O	XXX							1.56	689	

=== Shot put ===
Rank	Athlete	Attempt			Result	Points	Notes
Rank	Athlete	1	2	3	Result	Points	Notes
1	Ekaterina Voronina (UZB)	12.91	12.44	12.45	12.91	721	
2	Sepideh Tavakkoli (IRI)	12.62	12.43	12.54	12.62	702	
3	Yuliya Tarasova (UZB)	12.30	11.91	12.33	12.33	683	
4	Wang Qingling (CHN)	11.51	11.45	11.85	11.85	651	
5	Chu Chia-ling (TPE)	11.47	11.39	X	11.47	626	
6	Sushmitha Singha Roy (IND)	11.16	10.61	10.63	11.16	606	
7	Wassana Winatho (THA)	10.50	11.01	10.92	11.01	596	
8	Kotchakorn Khamrueangsri (THA)	10.67	10.20	X	10.67	573	
9	Huang Yu-ting (TPE)	9.75	10.44	X	10.44	558	
10	Swapna Barman (IND)	10.40	10.37	X	10.40	556	
11	Jeong Yeon-jin (KOR)	9.88	9.76	9.47	9.88	522	
12	Kristina Pronzhenko (TJK)	6.87	7.21	6.51	7.21	348	

=== 200 metres ===
- Wind – Heat 1: +0.4 m/s
- Wind – Heat 2: +0.6 m/s

Rank	Heat	Athlete	Time	Points	Notes
1	1	Wang Qingling (CHN)	24.19	963	
2	2	Kotchakorn Khamrueangsri (THA)	25.02	885	
3	1	Yuliya Tarasova (UZB)	25.22	867	
4	2	Ekaterina Voronina (UZB)	25.51	841	
5	2	Sushmitha Singha Roy (IND)	25.77	817	
6	2	Huang Yu-ting (TPE)	25.93	803	
7	2	Jeong Yeon-jin (KOR)	25.94	802	
8	2	Kristina Pronzhenko (TJK)	26.16	783	
9	1	Swapna Barman (IND)	26.42	761	
10	1	Chu Chia-ling (TPE)	26.50	754	
11	1	Sepideh Tavakkoli (IRI)	26.50	754	
—	1	Wassana Winatho (THA)	DNS		

=== Long jump ===
Rank	Athlete	Attempt			Result	Points	Notes
Rank	Athlete	1	2	3	Result	Points	Notes
1	Yuliya Tarasova (UZB)	6.20; 0.0	6.19 −0.3	X +0.1	6.20	912	
2	Wang Qingling (CHN)	6.10 −0.1	6.02 −0.7	6.13 −0.5	6.13	890	
3	Ekaterina Voronina (UZB)	5.96 +0.1	X −0.3	6.03 −0.6	6.03	859	
4	Huang Yu-ting (TPE)	5.60; 0.0	5.37 −0.3	5.57; 0.0	5.60	729	
5	Swapna Barman (IND)	5.28 −0.2	5.48; 0.0	5.55 −0.8	5.55	715	
6	Kristina Pronzhenko (TJK)	5.51 −0.3	5.44 +0.1	5.50; 0.0	5.51	703	
7	Kotchakorn Khamrueangsri (THA)	5.40 +0.3	5.31 −0.2	5.12 −0.1	5.40	671	
8	Jeong Yeon-jin (KOR)	3.68 −0.3	5.33; 0.0	5.26 +0.1	5.33	651	
9	Sushmitha Singha Roy (IND)	5.16 −0.1	5.19 +0.1	5.24; 0.0	5.24	626	
10	Chu Chia-ling (TPE)	4.80 −0.4	4.63; 0.0	—	4.80	506	
11	Sepideh Tavakkoli (IRI)	X −0.5	X 0.0	4.04 −0.1	4.04	317	

=== Javelin throw ===
Rank	Athlete	Attempt			Result	Points	Notes
Rank	Athlete	1	2	3	Result	Points	Notes
1	Ekaterina Voronina (UZB)	49.53	X	47.83	49.53	851	
2	Yuliya Tarasova (UZB)	38.44	42.47	38.43	42.47	715	
3	Chu Chia-ling (TPE)	37.31	38.14	40.18	40.18	671	
4	Swapna Barman (IND)	37.80	39.75	38.04	39.75	662	
5	Sepideh Tavakkoli (IRI)	39.32	39.32	35.77	39.32	654	
6	Wang Qingling (CHN)	36.33	34.46	37.12	37.12	612	
7	Sushmitha Singha Roy (IND)	34.40	36.91	35.19	36.91	608	
8	Kotchakorn Khamrueangsri (THA)	35.09	36.30	36.02	36.30	596	
9	Huang Yu-ting (TPE)	34.43	X	29.56	34.43	561	
10	Jeong Yeon-jin (KOR)	30.42	30.79	30.31	30.79	492	
11	Kristina Pronzhenko (TJK)	24.37	26.33	22.61	26.33	407	

=== 800 metres ===
Rank	Heat	Athlete	Time	Points	Notes
1	2	Ekaterina Voronina (UZB)	2:21.21	807	
2	1	Kristina Pronzhenko (TJK)	2:21.30	806	
3	2	Sushmitha Singha Roy (IND)	2:22.97	784	
4	2	Wang Qingling (CHN)	2:23.61	775	
5	1	Sepideh Tavakkoli (IRI)	2:25.48	751	
6	1	Jeong Yeon-jin (KOR)	2:26.41	739	
7	2	Swapna Barman (IND)	2:28.13	717	
8	1	Huang Yu-ting (TPE)	2:29.38	701	
9	1	Chu Chia-ling (TPE)	2:37.63	600	
10	2	Yuliya Tarasova (UZB)	2:45.01	517	
11	2	Kotchakorn Khamrueangsri (THA)	2:55.27	410	

=== Summary ===
Rank	Athlete	100mH	HJ	SP	200m	LJ	JT	800m	Total	Notes
1st place, gold medalist(s)	Ekaterina Voronina (UZB)	817	1016	721	841	859	851	807	5912	
2nd place, silver medalist(s)	Wang Qingling (CHN)	1024	941	651	963	890	612	775	5856	
3rd place, bronze medalist(s)	Yuliya Tarasova (UZB)	921	867	683	867	912	715	517	5482	
4	Sushmitha Singha Roy (IND)	886	867	606	817	626	608	784	5194	
5	Swapna Barman (IND)	864	903	556	761	715	662	717	5178	
6	Sepideh Tavakkoli (IRI)	859	1016	702	754	317	654	751	5053	
7	Huang Yu-ting (TPE)	928	759	558	803	729	561	701	5039	
8	Jeong Yeon-jin (KOR)	974	795	522	802	651	492	739	4975	
9	Kotchakorn Khamrueangsri (THA)	906	830	573	885	671	596	410	4871	
10	Chu Chia-ling (TPE)	847	830	626	754	506	671	600	4834	
11	Kristina Pronzhenko (TJK)	717	689	348	783	703	407	806	4453	
—	Wassana Winatho (THA)	953	903	596	DNS				DNF	
