= Meg Hemphill =

Japanese track and field athlete

Megumi Hemphill
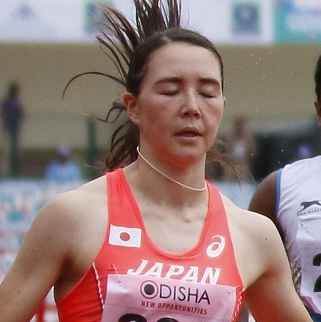
- in Odisha in 2017

Personal information
- National team: Japan
- Born: 23 May 1996 (age 30) Kyotanabe, Kyoto
- Education: Chuo University
- Occupation: Athlete
- Height: 167 cm (5 ft 6 in)
- Weight: 67 kg (148 lb)

Sport
- Sport: Heptathlon

Megumi Hemphill known as Megu Hemphill and Meg Hemphill (born 23 May 1996, in Kyotanabe, Kyoto) is a Japanese track and field athlete. She was the Japanese national champion in 2017 and she was placed second in the 2017 Asian Athletics Championships heptathlon.

== Life ==
Hemphill was born in 1996. Her parents, Chie and Scott, are from America and Japan and they called her "Megu". When she was eighteen she scored a record heptathlon (junior) score of 5519 while competing for Kyoto Bunkyo High School. She also won the 100 metres for them and she was the anchor in their relay team.

She became a student at Chuo University and in her first year she represented them at the heptathlon event in the 84th Japan Students Interscholastic Track and Field Tournament in Osaka. She won the event in September 2015.

She competed in the 2015 Asian Championships and she became the Japanese under 20 record holder at the heptathlon with a combined score of 5678. In the 2017 Asian Championships she won the silver medal behind Swapna Barman of India, and beat Purnima Hembram, also of India. In the 2017 heptathlon rankings for all of Asia, Swapna was second to the Chinese athlete Wang Qingling and Hemphill was third. She was 0.2 of a second behind the leading athlete at 100 metres

She finished sixth at the 2018 Asian Games, and did not finish the competition at the 2019 Asian Championships.

She achieved a personal best time of 13.3 seconds for the 100 Metres Hurdles at the Prefectural Stadium in Fukui in 2020.
