= Athletics at the 2018 Commonwealth Games – Women's heptathlon =

Women's heptathlon at the 2018 Commonwealth Games
- Venue: Carrara Stadium
- Dates: 12 April (day 1); 13 April (day 2)
- Competitors: 13 from 8 nations
- Winning points: 6255

Medalists
gold medal	Katarina Johnson-Thompson	England
silver medal	Nina Schultz	Canada
bronze medal	Niamh Emerson	England

The women's heptathlon at the 2018 Commonwealth Games, as part of the athletics program, took place in the Carrara Stadium on 12 and 13 April 2018.

== Records ==
Prior to this competition, the existing world and Games records were as follows:

World record	Jackie Joyner-Kersee (USA)	7291 points	Seoul, South Korea	23–24 September 1988
Games record	Jane Flemming (AUS)	6695 points	Auckland, New Zealand	27–28 January 1990

== Schedule ==
The schedule was as follows:

Date	Time	Round
Thursday 12 April 2018	10:05	100 metres hurdles
Thursday 12 April 2018	11:00	High jump
Thursday 12 April 2018	19:20	Shot put
Thursday 12 April 2018	20:57	200 metres
Friday 13 April 2018	10:30	Long jump
Friday 13 April 2018	12:25	Javelin throw
Friday 13 April 2018	20:05	800 metres

All times are Australian Eastern Standard Time (UTC+10)

== Event results ==
Competitors contested a series of 7 events over two days, with their results being converted into points. The final standings were decided by their cumulative points tallies.

=== 100 metres hurdles ===
Results after event 1 of 7:

Rank	Heat	Lane	Athlete	Reaction Time	Time	Points	Notes
1	2	3	Celeste Mucci (AUS)	0.158	13.19	1096	PB
2	2	5	Angela Whyte (CAN)	0.184	13.35	1072	
3	2	7	Nina Schultz (CAN)	0.191	13.47	1055	PB
4	1	7	Elizabeth Dadzie (GHA)	0.169	13.49	1052	
5	2	6	Katarina Johnson-Thompson (ENG)	0.191	13.54	1044	
6	1	4	Purnima Hembram (IND)	0.166	13.56	1041	PB
7	2	8	Niamh Emerson (ENG)	0.188	14.08	967	
8	2	2	Holly McArthur (SCO)	0.172	14.17	954	
9	1	6	Alysha Burnett (AUS)	0.161	14.32	934	SB
10	1	5	Niki Oudenaarden (CAN)	0.205	14.64	890	
11	1	3	Katherine O'Connor (NIR)	0.153	14.99	843	
12	1	8	Katy Sealy (BIZ)	0.205	15.18	818	PB
–	2	4	Katie Stainton (ENG)	0.215	DQ	0	R 168.7b
					Wind: +0.3 m/s (H1), +0.6 m/s (H2)		

=== High jump ===
Results after event 2 of 7:

Rank	Athlete	1.51	1.54	1.57	1.60	1.63	1.66	1.69	1.72	1.75	1.78	1.81	1.84	1.87	1.90	Mark	Points	Notes	Overall	Overall Rank
1	Katarina Johnson-Thompson (ENG)	–	–	–	–	–	–	–	–	–	–	o	o	o	xxx	1.87	1067		2111	1
2	Alysha Burnett (AUS)	–	–	–	–	–	–	–	–	o	o	o	xo	o	xxx	1.87	1067	PB	2001	4
3	Niamh Emerson (ENG)	–	–	–	–	–	–	–	o	xo	xxo	o	xo	r		1.84	1029	SB	1996	5
4	Nina Schultz (CAN)	–	–	–	–	–	o	o	o	xo	xxo	xo	xo	xxx		1.84	1029	PB	2084	2
5	Katherine O'Connor (NIR)	–	–	–	–	–	o	xxo	xo	xo	xo	xxx				1.78	953	=PB	1796	9
6	Celeste Mucci (AUS)	–	–	–	–	–	o	o	o	o	xxx					1.75	916	=PB	2012	3
7	Angela Whyte (CAN)	–	–	o	o	o	xo	xo	o	xxx						1.72	879	PB	1951	6
8	Purnima Hembram (IND)	–	o	o	o	o	o	xo	xxo	xxx						1.72	879	PB	1920	7
9	Katie Stainton (ENG)	–	o	o	o	o	xo	xo	xxo	xxx						1.72	879		879	13
10	Niki Oudenaarden (CAN)	–	–	–	o	xo	xo	o	xxx							1.69	842		1732	11
11	Holly McArthur (SCO)	–	o	o	o	o	o	xo	xxx							1.69	842	PB	1796	9
12	Katy Sealy (BIZ)	–	–	–	o	xo	xo	xxo	xxx							1.69	842	SB	1660	12
13	Elizabeth Dadzie (GHA)	o	o	o	o	xo	xxx									1.63	771		1823	8

=== Shot put ===
Results after event 3 of 7:

Rank	Athlete	#1	#2	#3	Mark	Points	Notes	Overall	Overall Rank
1	Niki Oudenaarden (CAN)	13.85	x	13.81	13.85	784		2516	8
2	Alysha Burnett (AUS)	13.62	12.69	13.20	13.62	769	PB	2770	1
3	Celeste Mucci (AUS)	11.63	12.22	11.38	12.22	676	PB	2688	4
4	Nina Schultz (CAN)	12.03	12.13	12.12	12.13	670		2754	2
5	Niamh Emerson (ENG)	11.86	12.08	12.13	12.13	670		2666	5
6	Katherine O'Connor (NIR)	10.50	11.97	11.55	11.97	659		2455	9
7	Purnima Hembram (IND)	11.75	11.55	11.56	11.75	645		2565	7
8	Holly McArthur (SCO)	10.97	11.58	10.78	11.58	633	PB	2429	10
9	Katarina Johnson-Thompson (ENG)	x	11.36	11.54	11.54	631		2742	3
10	Angela Whyte (CAN)	11.48	x	11.34	11.48	627		2578	6
11	Katy Sealy (BIZ)	10.75	11.40	x	11.40	621	SB	2281	12
12	Elizabeth Dadzie (GHA)	10.95	10.90	11.06	11.06	599		2422	11
–	Katie Stainton (ENG)				DNS	–		DNF	–

=== 200 metres ===
Results after event 4 of 7:

Rank	Heat	Lane	Athlete	Reaction Time	Time	Points	Notes	Overall	Overall Rank
1	2	5	Katarina Johnson-Thompson (ENG)	0.172	23.56	1023		3765	1
2	2	2	Celeste Mucci (AUS)	0.154	24.59	925		3613	3
3	1	2	Niamh Emerson (ENG)	0.168	24.83	902		3568	4
4	1	5	Nina Schultz (CAN)	0.168	25.02	885	SB	3639	2
5	2	4	Niki Oudenaarden (CAN)	0.214	25.03	884		3400	8
6	1	7	Purnima Hembram (IND)	0.186	25.12	876		3441	6
7	2	7	Katherine O'Connor (NIR)	0.146	25.26	863		3318	9
8	2	8	Angela Whyte (CAN)	0.146	25.36	854		3432	7
9	2	6	Holly McArthur (SCO)	0.166	25.50	841		3270	10
10	1	4	Alysha Burnett (AUS)	0.144	26.76	732		3502	5
11	1	6	Katy Sealy (BIZ)	0.197	27.64	659	SB	2940	11
–	1	3	Elizabeth Dadzie (GHA)	0.180	DQ	0	R 163.3a	2422	12
					Wind: -0.3 m/s (H1), -0.4 m/s (H2)				

=== Long jump ===
Results after event 5 of 7:

Rank	Athlete	#1	#2	#3	Mark	Points	Notes	Overall	Overall Rank
1	Katarina Johnson-Thompson (ENG)	6.20 -0.7 m/s	6.50 +0.3 m/s	–	6.50	1007		4772	1
2	Nina Schultz (CAN)	6.19 +0.3 m/s	6.08 -0.5 m/s	x -1.8 m/s	6.19	908	=PB	4547	2
3	Celeste Mucci (AUS)	5.66 +1.0 m/s	5.99 -1.7 m/s	6.10 -0.5 m/s	6.10	880		4493	3
4	Angela Whyte (CAN)	5.83; 0.0 m/s	6.00; 0.0 m/s	6.07 -0.9 m/s	6.07	871		4303	5
5	Niamh Emerson (ENG)	5.60 -1.0 m/s	6.06 -1.1 m/s	5.88 -0.5 m/s	6.06	868		4436	4
6	Purnima Hembram (IND)	5.79 -0.9 m/s	5.96 +0.2 m/s	x +0.1 m/s	5.96	837		4278	7
7	Niki Oudenaarden (CAN)	5.84 -0.4 m/s	x -1.2 m/s	x -2.5 m/s	5.84	801		4201	8
8	Alysha Burnett (AUS)	5.82 -0.3 m/s	–	–	5.82	795		4297	6
9	Elizabeth Dadzie (GHA)	5.72 -0.3 m/s	5.76 -2.2 m/s	x +0.9 m/s	5.76	777		3199	12
10	Katherine O'Connor (NIR)	5.54 -0.3 m/s	5.64 +0.1 m/s	x -0.7 m/s	5.64	741		4059	9
11	Holly McArthur (SCO)	5.30 +0.2 m/s	5.33 -0.3 m/s	5.49 -0.4 m/s	5.49	697		3967	10
12	Katy Sealy (BIZ)	5.10 +0.2 m/s	4.98 -0.7 m/s	5.13 -0.9 m/s	5.13	595	SB	3535	11

=== Javelin throw ===
Results after event 6 of 7:

Rank	Athlete	#1	#2	#3	Mark	Points	Notes	Overall	Overall Rank
1	Alysha Burnett (AUS)	46.56	45.91	44.86	46.56	794	SB	5091	5
2	Katherine O'Connor (NIR)	46.34	45.58	45.08	46.34	789		4848	9
3	Niki Oudenaarden (CAN)	43.58	45.42	40.92	45.42	772		4973	8
4	Angela Whyte (CAN)	41.92	44.09	44.58	44.58	755	PB	5058	6
5	Nina Schultz (CAN)	41.34	42.14	43.11	43.11	727		5274	2
6	Celeste Mucci (AUS)	41.98	43.03	x	43.03	726	PB	5219	3
7	Purnima Hembram (IND)	38.56	41.08	41.57	41.57	697		4975	7
8	Katarina Johnson-Thompson (ENG)	40.46	–	–	40.46	676		5448	1
9	Niamh Emerson (ENG)	39.91	40.34	x	40.34	674	PB	5110	4
10	Elizabeth Dadzie (GHA)	36.46	x	38.21	38.21	633		3832	12
11	Katy Sealy (BIZ)	33.80	35.51	33.96	35.51	581		4116	11
12	Holly McArthur (SCO)	30.68	29.96	30.88	30.88	493		4460	10

=== 800 metres ===
Results after event 7 of 7:

Rank	Heat	Lane	Name	Time	Points	Notes
1	2	6	Niamh Emerson (ENG)	2:12.18	933	
2	1	3	Holly McArthur (SCO)	2:13.04	921	
3	1	6	Niki Oudenaarden (CAN)	2:14.10	905	PB
4	2	7	Nina Schultz (CAN)	2:17.40	859	PB
5	1	2	Purnima Hembram (IND)	2:17.44	859	
6	1	7	Katherine O'Connor (NIR)	2:18.30	847	
7	2	4	Angela Whyte (CAN)	2:18.79	840	
8	1	5	Elizabeth Dadzie (GHA)	2:19.10	836	PB
9	2	3	Katarina Johnson-Thompson (ENG)	2:21.24	807	
10	2	5	Celeste Mucci (AUS)	2:29.73	696	
11	1	4	Katy Sealy (BIZ)	2:35.42	627	SB
12	2	2	Alysha Burnett (AUS)	2:43.14	537	

== Standings ==
The highest mark recorded in each event is highlighted in yellow with a diamond symbol.

The final standings were as follows:

Rank	Athlete	Total	Notes	100 mH	HJ	SP	200 m	LJ	JT	800 m
1st place, gold medalist(s)	Katarina Johnson-Thompson (ENG)	6255		1044	1067♦	631	1023♦	1007♦	676	807
2nd place, silver medalist(s)	Nina Schultz (CAN)	6133	PB	1055	1029	670	885	908	727	859
3rd place, bronze medalist(s)	Niamh Emerson (ENG)	6043	PB	967	1029	670	902	868	674	933♦
4	Celeste Mucci (AUS)	5915	PB	1096♦	916	676	925	880	726	696
5	Angela Whyte (CAN)	5898		1072	879	627	854	871	755	840
6	Niki Oudenaarden (CAN)	5878		890	842	784♦	884	801	772	905
7	Purnima Hembram (IND)	5834	PB	1041	879	645	876	837	697	859
8	Katherine O'Connor (NIR)	5695		843	953	659	863	741	789	847
9	Alysha Burnett (AUS)	5628		934	1067♦	769	732	795	794♦	537
10	Holly McArthur (SCO)	5381		954	842	633	841	697	493	921
11	Katy Sealy (BIZ)	4743		818	842	621	659	595	581	627
12	Elizabeth Dadzie (GHA)	4668		1052	771	599	0	777	633	836
–	Katie Stainton (ENG)	DNF		0	879	–	–	–	–	–
