= Athletics at the 2018 Asian Games – Women's heptathlon =

Women's heptathlon at the 2018 Asian Games
- Venue: Gelora Bung Karno Stadium
- Dates: 28–29 August 2018
- Competitors: 11 from 8 nations

Medalists
gold medal	Swapna Barman	India
silver medal	Wang Qingling	China
bronze medal	Yuki Yamasaki	Japan

The women's heptathlon event at the 2018 Asian Games was held at the Gelora Bung Karno Stadium, Jakarta, Indonesia on 28–29 August. The event was won by Swapna Barman from India.

== Schedule ==
All times are Western Indonesia Time (UTC+07:00)

Date	Time	Event
Tuesday, 28 August 2018	09:00	100 metres hurdles
Tuesday, 28 August 2018	10:30	High jump
Tuesday, 28 August 2018	18:45	Shot put
Tuesday, 28 August 2018	20:25	200 metres
Wednesday, 29 August 2018	09:00	Long jump
Wednesday, 29 August 2018	10:30	Javelin throw
Wednesday, 29 August 2018	20:10	800 metres

== Records ==
Prior to this competition, the existing world, Asian and Games records were as follows.

World Record	Jackie Joyner-Kersee (USA)	7291	Seoul, South Korea	24 September 1988
Asian Record	Ghada Shouaa (SYR)	6942	Götzis, Austria	26 May 1996
Games Record	Ghada Shouaa (SYR)	6360	Hiroshima, Japan	11 October 1994

== Results ==
Legend

- DNF — Did not finish
- DNS — Did not start
- NM — No mark

=== 100 metres hurdles ===
- Wind – Heat 1: +1.2 m/s
- Wind – Heat 2: −0.1 m/s

Rank	Heat	Athlete	Time	Points	Notes
1	1	Wang Qingling (CHN)	13.49	1052	
2	2	Meg Hemphill (JPN)	13.69	1023	
3	2	Purnima Hembram (IND)	13.85	1000	
4	2	Chu Chia-ling (TPE)	13.95	985	
5	2	Swapna Barman (IND)	13.98	981	
6	1	Jeong Yeon-jin (KOR)	13.99	980	
7	1	Yuki Yamasaki (JPN)	14.02	976	
8	2	Shen Muhan (CHN)	14.30	936	
9	1	Sunisa Khotseemueang (THA)	14.70	882	
10	1	Ekaterina Voronina (UZB)	14.72	879	
11	1	Norliyana Kamaruddin (MAS)	14.97	846	

=== High jump ===
Rank	Athlete	Attempt										Result	Points	Notes
Rank	Athlete	1.40	1.43	1.46	1.49	1.52	1.55	1.58	1.61	1.64	1.67	Result	Points	Notes
Rank	Athlete	1.70	1.73	1.76	1.79	1.82	1.85					Result	Points	Notes
1	Swapna Barman (IND)	–	–	–	–	–	–	–	–	O	–	1.82	1003	
1	Swapna Barman (IND)	XO	O	O	O	O	XXX					1.82	1003	
2	Norliyana Kamaruddin (MAS)	–	–	–	–	–	–	–	–	O	O	1.82	1003	
2	Norliyana Kamaruddin (MAS)	O	O	O	XXO	XXO	XXX					1.82	1003	
3	Ekaterina Voronina (UZB)	–	–	–	–	–	–	–	–	O	O	1.76	928	
3	Ekaterina Voronina (UZB)	O	O	XO	XXX							1.76	928	
4	Wang Qingling (CHN)	–	–	–	–	–	O	O	O	O	O	1.73	891	
4	Wang Qingling (CHN)	O	O	XXX								1.73	891	
5	Purnima Hembram (IND)	–	–	–	–	–	O	O	O	O	O	1.73	891	
5	Purnima Hembram (IND)	O	XXO	XXX								1.73	891	
6	Yuki Yamasaki (JPN)	–	–	–	–	–	O	O	O	O	XO	1.70	855	
6	Yuki Yamasaki (JPN)	XO	XXX									1.70	855	
7	Sunisa Khotseemueang (THA)	–	–	–	–	–	–	O	O	O	O	1.70	855	
7	Sunisa Khotseemueang (THA)	XXO	XXX									1.70	855	
8	Jeong Yeon-jin (KOR)	–	–	–	–	–	–	–	–	O	O	1.67	818	
8	Jeong Yeon-jin (KOR)	XXX										1.67	818	
9	Shen Muhan (CHN)	–	–	–	–	–	O	O	O	XO	O	1.67	818	
9	Shen Muhan (CHN)	XXX										1.67	818	
10	Meg Hemphill (JPN)	–	–	–	–	–	O	XO	O	O	XXX	1.64	783	
11	Chu Chia-ling (TPE)	–	–	–	–	–	O	O	O	XO	XXX	1.64	783	

=== Shot put ===
Rank	Athlete	Attempt			Result	Points	Notes
Rank	Athlete	1	2	3	Result	Points	Notes
1	Shen Muhan (CHN)	11.93	12.26	12.78	12.78	713	
2	Swapna Barman (IND)	12.69	12.25	11.91	12.69	707	
3	Ekaterina Voronina (UZB)	12.57	12.16	12.59	12.59	700	
4	Purnima Hembram (IND)	11.25	11.83	12.24	12.24	677	
5	Sunisa Khotseemueang (THA)	12.19	11.21	11.67	12.19	674	
6	Yuki Yamasaki (JPN)	12.12	11.94	12.13	12.13	670	
7	Wang Qingling (CHN)	11.97	11.10	11.66	11.97	659	
8	Meg Hemphill (JPN)	11.50	11.97	11.51	11.97	659	
9	Chu Chia-ling (TPE)	X	11.07	11.82	11.82	649	
10	Norliyana Kamaruddin (MAS)	10.19	11.11	X	11.11	602	
11	Jeong Yeon-jin (KOR)	X	10.26	10.66	10.66	573	

=== 200 metres ===
- Wind – Heat 1: −0.5 m/s
- Wind – Heat 2: −0.1 m/s

Rank	Heat	Athlete	Time	Points	Notes
1	1	Wang Qingling (CHN)	24.74	911	
2	1	Yuki Yamasaki (JPN)	24.75	910	
3	2	Purnima Hembram (IND)	25.34	856	
4	2	Meg Hemphill (JPN)	25.37	853	
5	1	Ekaterina Voronina (UZB)	25.68	825	
6	2	Chu Chia-ling (TPE)	26.02	795	
7	2	Swapna Barman (IND)	26.08	790	
8	2	Shen Muhan (CHN)	26.29	772	
9	1	Sunisa Khotseemueang (THA)	26.49	755	
10	1	Norliyana Kamaruddin (MAS)	26.50	754	
11	2	Jeong Yeon-jin (KOR)	26.91	719	

=== Long jump ===
Rank	Athlete	Attempt			Result	Points	Notes
Rank	Athlete	1	2	3	Result	Points	Notes
1	Wang Qingling (CHN)	6.44; 0.0	6.21; 0.0	X +1.1	6.44	988	
2	Swapna Barman (IND)	5.82 −0.5	6.05; 0.0	X −1.0	6.05	865	
3	Meg Hemphill (JPN)	5.97 −0.4	X 0.0	5.75 −1.3	5.97	840	
4	Yuki Yamasaki (JPN)	5.89; 0.0	X 0.0	5.75; 0.0	5.89	816	
5	Purnima Hembram (IND)	5.85; 0.0	5.82; 0.0	X 0.0	5.85	804	
6	Chu Chia-ling (TPE)	5.35 −0.9	5.78 +0.4	5.41 −0.2	5.78	783	
7	Shen Muhan (CHN)	5.57; 0.0	5.75; 0.0	X 0.0	5.75	774	
8	Ekaterina Voronina (UZB)	X 0.0	5.64; 0.0	X −1.0	5.64	741	
9	Jeong Yeon-jin (KOR)	5.59 −1.0	5.25 −0.5	5.37; 0.0	5.59	726	
10	Norliyana Kamaruddin (MAS)	X −0.1	5.53 −0.4	X −0.7	5.53	709	
—	Sunisa Khotseemueang (THA)				DNS		

=== Javelin throw ===
Rank	Athlete	Attempt			Result	Points	Notes
Rank	Athlete	1	2	3	Result	Points	Notes
1	Swapna Barman (IND)	50.63	49.42	X	50.63	872	
2	Ekaterina Voronina (UZB)	49.06	49.91	X	49.91	858	
3	Yuki Yamasaki (JPN)	43.28	42.99	46.48	46.48	792	
4	Purnima Hembram (IND)	39.89	45.48	44.01	45.48	773	
5	Shen Muhan (CHN)	43.88	40.64	43.30	43.88	742	
6	Meg Hemphill (JPN)	43.71	39.89	43.19	43.71	739	
7	Chu Chia-ling (TPE)	39.39	42.28	42.74	42.74	720	
8	Wang Qingling (CHN)	35.60	38.21	39.33	39.33	654	
9	Jeong Yeon-jin (KOR)	35.64	33.09	31.26	35.64	584	
—	Norliyana Kamaruddin (MAS)	X	X	X	NM	0	

=== 800 metres ===
Rank	Heat	Athlete	Time	Points	Notes
1	2	Ekaterina Voronina (UZB)	2:14.81	895	
2	2	Yuki Yamasaki (JPN)	2:17.75	854	
3	2	Purnima Hembram (IND)	2:19.09	836	
4	2	Swapna Barman (IND)	2:21.13	808	
5	2	Wang Qingling (CHN)	2:21.79	799	
6	1	Jeong Yeon-jin (KOR)	2:23.32	779	
7	1	Shen Muhan (CHN)	2:24.46	764	
8	1	Meg Hemphill (JPN)	2:25.00	757	
9	1	Norliyana Kamaruddin (MAS)	2:26.05	743	
10	1	Chu Chia-ling (TPE)	2:27.70	722	

=== Summary ===
Rank	Athlete	100mH	HJ	SP	200m	LJ	JT	800m	Total	Notes
1st place, gold medalist(s)	Swapna Barman (IND)	981	1003	707	790	865	872	808	6026	
2nd place, silver medalist(s)	Wang Qingling (CHN)	1052	891	659	911	988	654	799	5954	
3rd place, bronze medalist(s)	Yuki Yamasaki (JPN)	976	855	670	910	816	792	854	5873	
4	Purnima Hembram (IND)	1000	891	677	856	804	773	836	5837	
5	Ekaterina Voronina (UZB)	879	928	700	825	741	858	895	5826	
6	Meg Hemphill (JPN)	1023	783	659	853	840	739	757	5654	
7	Shen Muhan (CHN)	936	818	713	772	774	742	764	5519	
8	Chu Chia-ling (TPE)	985	783	649	795	783	720	722	5437	
9	Jeong Yeon-jin (KOR)	980	818	573	719	726	584	779	5179	
10	Norliyana Kamaruddin (MAS)	846	1003	602	754	709	0	743	4657	
—	Sunisa Khotseemueang (THA)	882	855	674	755	DNS			DNF	
