= Ekaterina Voronina =

Uzbekistani heptathlete

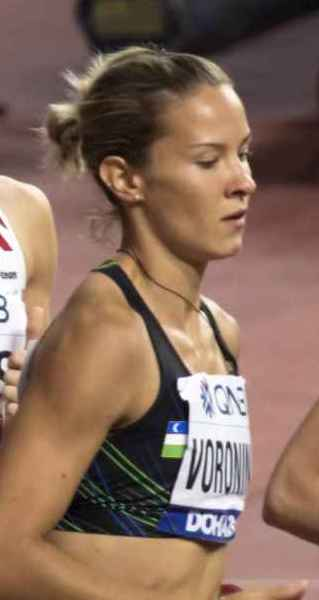
- Voronina in 2019

Personal information
- Full name: Ekaterina Alexandrovna Voronina
- Born: 16 February 1992 (age 34) Tashkent, Uzbekistan
- Height: 173 cm (5 ft 8 in)
- Weight: 65 kg (143 lb)
Medal record
Women's athletics
Representing Uzbekistan
Asian Games
Gold medal – first place	2014 Incheon	Heptathlon
Silver medal – second place	2022 Hangzhou	Heptathlon
Asian Championships
Gold medal – first place	2023 Bangkok	Heptathlon
Silver medal – second place	2013 Pune	Heptathlon
Asian Indoor Championships
Gold medal – first place	2016 Doha	Pentathlon
Gold medal – first place	2023 Astana	Pentathlon

Ekaterina Alexandrovna Voronina (Russian: Екатерина Александровна Воронина; born 16 February 1992 in Tashkent) is a retired Uzbekistani track and field athlete who competes in the heptathlon. Her personal best for the event is 6346 points in 2021. She was the gold medallist in the event at the 2014 Asian Games. She is part of the Central Army Sports Club and is coached by Pavel Andreev, a compatriot and fellow multi-eventer.

As a teenager, Voronina specialised in the javelin throw and was runner-up at the national championships at the age of fifteen. She represented her country in that event at the 2009 World Youth Championships in Athletics, competing in the qualifying round only. She took up the heptathlon event in 2011 and soon afterwards won the Uzbekistan national title with a personal best of 5287 points. After an absence in the 2012 season she returned to make her senior international debut at the 2013 Asian Athletics Championships. Five personal bests saw her accumulate 5599 points and take the silver medal behind the defending champion, Wassana Winatho of Thailand. Voronina won her second national title in September that year.

At the start of the following season, she entered her first major women's pentathlon competition at the 2014 Asian Indoor Athletics Championships. She had a three-way tie on 3951 points with Irina Karpova and Sepideh Tavakoli and was placed fourth on head-to-head results. Yuliya Tarasova, another Uzbekistani athlete, was the silver medallist at the competition. Moving into the outdoor season she set a personal best of 5890 points in Asikkala in August. She was chosen to compete at the 2014 Asian Games and established herself among the region's best athletes by taking the gold medal in a score of 5912 points. Setting bests in the 100 metres hurdles, high jump, 200 metres, and the 800 metres final, she beat both defending champion Tarasova and the Asian indoor champion Wang Qingling of China. she is finished 12 at the 2020 Tokyo Olympics.

== International competitions ==
Year	Competition	Venue	Position	Event	Notes
2009	World Youth Championships	Brixen, Italy	14th (q)	Javelin throw	46.13 m
2013	Asian Championships	Pune, India	2nd	Heptathlon	5599 pts
2014	Asian Indoor Championships	Hangzhou, China	4th	Pentathlon	3951 pts
2014	Asian Games	Incheon, South Korea	1st	Heptathlon	5912 pts
2015	Asian Championships	Wuhan, China	1st	Heptathlon	5689 pts
2015	World Championships	Beijing, China	24th	Heptathlon	5701 pts
2016	Asian Indoor Championships	Doha, Qatar	1st	Pentathlon	4224 pts
2016	Olympic Games	Rio de Janeiro, Brazil	–	Heptathlon	DNF
2018	Asian Games	Jakarta, Indonesia	5th	Heptathlon	5826 pts
2019	Asian Championships	Doha, Qatar	1st	Heptathlon	6198 pts
2019	World Championships	Doha, Qatar	10th	Heptathlon	6099 pts
2021	Olympic Games	Tokyo, Japan	12th	Heptathlon	6298 pts
2023	Asian Indoor Championships	Astana, Kazakhstan	1st	Pentathlon	4386 pts
2023	Asian Championships	Bangkok, Thailand	1st	Heptathlon	6098 pts
2023	World Championships	Budapest, Hungary	16th	Heptathlon	5922 pts
2023	Asian Games	Hangzhou, China	2nd	Heptathlon	6056 pts

== Personal bests ==
- Heptathlon – 6346 points (2021)
  - 100 metres hurdles – 14.19 sec (2021)
  - High jump – 1.85 m (2021)
  - Shot put – 14.05 m (2019)
  - 200 metres – 24.67 sec (2021)
  - Long jump – 6.27 m (2021)
  - Javelin throw – 53.53 m (2019)
  - 800 metres – 2:14.81 min (2018)
- Women's pentathlon – 4386 points (2023)
  - 60 metres hurdles – 8.76 sec (2023)
  - High jump – 1.81 m (2016)
  - Shot put – 13.66 m (2015)
  - Long jump – 6.00 m (2015)
  - 800 metres – 2:17.22 min (2023)
