= 2023 Asian Athletics Championships – Women's heptathlon =

Women's heptathlon at the 2023 Asian Athletics Championships
- Venue: National Stadium
- Location: Bangkok, Thailand
- Dates: 14-15 July
- Competitors: 9 from 8 nations
- Winning score: 6098 pts

Medalists
gold medal	Ekaterina Voronina	Uzbekistan
silver medal	Swapna Barman	India
bronze medal	Yuki Yamasaki	Japan

The women's heptathlon event at the 2023 Asian Athletics Championships was held on 14 and 15 July.

== Records ==
Records before the 2023 Asian Athletics Championships
Record	Athlete (nation)	Points	Location	Date
World record	Jackie Joyner-Kersee (USA)	7291	Seoul, South Korea	24 September 1998
Asian record	Ghada Shouaa (SYR)	6492	Götzis, Austria	26 May 1996
Championship record	Ghada Shouaa (SYR)	6259	Manila, Philippines	2 December 1993
World leading	Anna Hall (USA)	6988	Götzis, Austria	28 May 2023
Asian leading	No scores recorded			

== Results ==
=== 100 metres hurdles ===
Wind:
Heat 1: -0.3 m/s, Heat 2: -0.2 m/s

Rank	Heat	Name	Nationality	Time	Points	Notes
1	2	Zheng Ninali	China	13.92	990	
2	2	Karin Odama	Japan	13.94	987	
3	2	Swapna Barman	India	13.98	981	
4	2	Yuki Yamasaki	Japan	14.07	968	
5	2	Chen Tsai-chuan	Chinese Taipei	14.35	929	
6	1	Ekaterina Voronina	Uzbekistan	14.62	892	
7	1	Sarah Dequinan	Philippines	14.76	874	
8	1	Sunisa Khotseemueang	Thailand	14.96	847	
9	1	Diana Geints	Kazakhstan	16.42	664	

=== High jump ===
Rank	Athlete	Nationality	1.53	1.56	1.59	1.62	1.65	1.68	1.71	1.74	1.77	1.80	1.83	Result	Points	Notes	Total
1	Swapna Barman	India	–	–	–	–	o	o	o	o	xxo	o	xxx	1.80	978		1959
2	Ekaterina Voronina	Uzbekistan	–	–	–	–	o	o	o	xxo	o	xxx		1.77	941		1833
3	Chen Tsai-chuan	Chinese Taipei	–	–	–	o	o	o	–	xxo	xxx			1.74	903		1832
4	Karin Odama	Japan	–	–	–	o	o	xo	xxx					1.68	830		1817
4	Sarah Dequinan	Philippines	–	o	–	o	–	xo	xxx					1.68	830		1704
6	Diana Geints	Kazakhstan	–	–	o	o	o	xxo	xxx					1.68			
6	Sunisa Khotseemueang	Thailand	–	o	o	o	o	xxo	xxx					1.68	830		1677
8	Yuki Yamasaki	Japan	xo	o	o	xxo	xxx							1.62	759		1727
9	Zheng Ninali	China	–	–	–	–	–	–	xxx					NM	0		990

=== Shot put ===
Rank	Athlete	Nationality	#1	#2	#3	Result	Points	Notes	Total
1	Yuki Yamasaki	Japan	13.30	13.54	13.39	13.54	763		2490
2	Ekaterina Voronina	Uzbekistan	13.19	12.81	x	13.19	740		2573
3	Chen Tsai-chuan	Chinese Taipei	13.15	11.70	12.17	13.15	737		2569
4	Karin Odama	Japan	x	12.90	12.59	12.90	721		2538
5	Zheng Ninali	China	12.09	x	x	12.09	667		1657
6	Swapna Barman	India	11.26	11.96	11.26	11.96	658		2617
7	Diana Geints	Kazakhstan	10.78	11.15	11.03	11.15	605		2099
8	Sarah Dequinan	Philippines	10.40	11.13	10.64	11.13	604		2308
9	Sunisa Khotseemueang	Thailand	8.82	10.10	8.99	10.10	536		2213

=== 200 metres ===
Wind: +0.9 m/s

Rank	Lane	Name	Nationality	Time	Points	Notes	Total
1	4	Ekaterina Voronina	Uzbekistan	25.13	875	SB	3448
2	5	Yuki Yamasaki	Japan	25.19	869		3359
3	2	Sarah Dequinan	Philippines	26.01	796		3104
4	6	Chen Tsai-chuan	Chinese Taipei	26.13	786		3355
5	1	Swapna Barman	India	26.26	775		3392
6	3	Karin Odama	Japan	26.31	770		3308
7	7	Sunisa Khotseemueang	Thailand	26.87	723		3936
8	8	Diana Geints	Kazakhstan	27.53	668		2767
	–	Zheng Ninali	China	DNS	0		DNF

=== Long jump ===
Rank	Athlete	Nationality	#1	#2	#3	Result	Points	Notes	Total
1	Ekaterina Voronina	Uzbekistan	5.70	5.73	6.07	6.07	871		4319
2	Swapna Barman	India	5.57	5.84	5.84	5.84	801		4193
3	Sarah Dequinan	Philippines	5.65	5.82	5.67	5.82	795	SB	3899
4	Yuki Yamasaki	Japan	x	5.69	5.55	5.69	756		4115
5	Karin Odama	Japan	5.66	5.43	x	5.66	747		4055
6	Chen Tsai-chuan	Chinese Taipei	5.65	x	x	5.65	744		4099
7	Sunisa Khotseemueang	Thailand	x	5.47	5.63	5.63	738		3674
8	Diana Geints	Kazakhstan	5.17	x	2.53	5.17	606	SB	3373

=== Javelin throw ===
Rank	Athlete	Nationality	#1	#2	#3	Result	Points	Notes	Total
1	Ekaterina Voronina	Uzbekistan	51.87	x	x	51.87	896	SB	5215
2	Swapna Barman	India	x	51.09	46.94	51.09	881		5074
3	Sarah Dequinan	Philippines	44.27	46.06	44.29	46.06	784		4683
4	Yuki Yamasaki	Japan	42.85	38.69	42.30	42.85	722		4837
5	Diana Geints	Kazakhstan	40.78	39.90	39.10	40.78	682		4055
6	Karin Odama	Japan	x	x	40.39	40.39	675		4730
7	Chen Tsai-chuan	Chinese Taipei	38.26	37.10	37.68	38.26	634		4733
8	Sunisa Khotseemueang	Thailand	36.57	36.74	37.00	37.00	610		4284

=== 800 metres ===
Rank	Name	Nationality	Time	Points	Notes
1	Ekaterina Voronina	Uzbekistan	2:15.68	883	SB
2	Yuki Yamasaki	Japan	2:17.44	859	
3	Swapna Barman	India	2:24.32	766	
4	Sarah Dequinan	Philippines	2:24.54	763	PB
5	Karin Odama	Japan	2:24.97	757	
6	Chen Tsai-chuan	Chinese Taipei	2:33.22	653	
7	Diana Geints	Kazakhstan	2:36.27	616	

=== Final standings ===
The highest mark recorded in each event is highlighted in yellow

Rank	Athlete	Nationality	100m H	HJ	SP	200m	LJ	JT	800m	Points	Notes
1st place, gold medalist(s)	Ekaterina Voronina	Uzbekistan	14.62	1.77	13.19	25.13	6.07	51.87	2:15.68	6098	
2nd place, silver medalist(s)	Swapna Barman	India	13.98	1.80	11.96	26.26	5.84	51.09	2:24.32	5840	
3rd place, bronze medalist(s)	Yuki Yamasaki	Japan	14.07	1.62	13.54	25.19	5.69	42.85	2:17.44	5696	
4	Karin Odama	Japan	13.94	1.68	12.90	26.31	5.66	40.39	2:24.97	5487	
5	Sarah Dequinan	Philippines	14.76	1.68	11.13	26.01	5.82	46.06	2:24.54	5446	NR
6	Chen Tsai-chuan	Chinese Taipei	14.35	1.74	13.15	26.13	5.65	38.26	2:33.22	5386	
7	Diana Geints	Kazakhstan	16.42	1.68	11.15	27.53	5.17	40.78	2:36.27	4671	
	Sunisa Khotseemueang	Thailand	14.96	1.68	10.10	26.87	5.63	37.00	DNS	DNF	
	Zheng Ninali	China	13.92	NM	12.09	DNS	–	–	–	DNF	
