= Athletics at the 2022 Asian Games – Women's heptathlon =

Women's heptathlon at the 2022 Asian Games
- Venue: Hangzhou Olympic Expo Main Stadium
- Date: 30 September – 1 October 2023
- Competitors: 10 from 7 nations

Medalists
| gold medal | Zheng Ninali | China |
| silver medal | Ekaterina Voronina | Uzbekistan |
| bronze medal | Nandini Agasara | India |

The women's heptathlon competition at the 2022 Asian Games took place on 30 September and 1 October 2023 at the HOC Stadium, Hangzhou, China.

== Schedule ==
All times are China Standard Time (UTC+08:00)

| Date | Time | Event |
|---|---|---|
| Saturday, 30 September 2023 | 09:00 | 100 metres hurdles |
| Saturday, 30 September 2023 | 09:50 | High jump |
| Saturday, 30 September 2023 | 19:10 | Shot put |
| Saturday, 30 September 2023 | 21:05 | 200 metres |
| Sunday, 1 October 2023 | 09:00 | Long jump |
| Sunday, 1 October 2023 | 10:05 | Javelin throw |
| Sunday, 1 October 2023 | 20:45 | 800 metres |

== Records ==
Prior to this competition, the existing world, Asian and Games records were as follows.

| World Record | Jackie Joyner-Kersee (USA) | 7291 | Seoul, South Korea | 24 September 1988 |
| Asian Record | Ghada Shouaa (SYR) | 6942 | Götzis, Austria | 26 May 1996 |
| Games Record | Ghada Shouaa (SYR) | 6360 | Hiroshima, Japan | 11 October 1994 |

== Results ==
=== 100 metres hurdles ===
- Wind – Heat 1: 0.0 m/s
- Wind – Heat 2: +1.6 m/s

| Rank | Heat | Athlete | Time | Points | Notes |
|---|---|---|---|---|---|
| 1 | 2 | Zheng Ninali (CHN) | 13.48 | 1053 | |
| 2 | 2 | Swapna Barman (IND) | 13.88 | 995 | |
| 3 | 2 | Karin Odama (JPN) | 13.92 | 990 | |
| 4 | 2 | Nandini Agasara (IND) | 14.01 | 977 | |
| 5 | 2 | Yuki Yamasaki (JPN) | 14.22 | 947 | |
| 6 | 1 | Chen Cai-juan (TPE) | 14.28 | 939 | |
| 7 | 1 | Ekaterina Voronina (UZB) | 14.48 | 912 | |
| 8 | 1 | Liu Jingyi (CHN) | 14.49 | 910 | |
| 9 | 1 | Sarah Dequinan (PHI) | 14.78 | 871 | |
| 10 | 1 | Sunisa Khotseemueang (THA) | 15.09 | 830 | |

=== High jump ===
| Rank | Athlete | Attempt | | | | | | | | | | Result | Points | Notes |
| Rank | Athlete | 1.55 | 1.58 | 1.61 | 1.64 | 1.67 | 1.70 | 1.73 | 1.76 | 1.79 | 1.82 | Result | Points | Notes |
| Rank | Athlete | 1.85 | | | | | | | | | | Result | Points | Notes |
|---|---|---|---|---|---|---|---|---|---|---|---|---|---|---|
| 1 | Ekaterina Voronina (UZB) | – | – | – | O | O | O | O | O | O | O | 1.82 | 1003 | |
| 1 | Ekaterina Voronina (UZB) | XXX | | | | | | | | | | 1.82 | 1003 | |
| 2 | Zheng Ninali (CHN) | – | – | – | O | – | O | O | O | XXX | | 1.76 | 928 | |
| 3 | Karin Odama (JPN) | – | – | O | XXO | XO | XO | XXO | XXX | | | 1.73 | 891 | |
| 4 | Swapna Barman (IND) | – | – | – | O | O | O | XXX | | | | 1.70 | 855 | |
| 5 | Chen Cai-juan (TPE) | – | – | O | O | XO | O | XXX | | | | 1.70 | 855 | |
| 5 | Liu Jingyi (CHN) | O | O | O | O | XO | O | XXX | | | | 1.70 | 855 | |
| 7 | Sarah Dequinan (PHI) | – | O | O | O | XXO | XXX | | | | | 1.67 | 818 | |
| 8 | Sunisa Khotseemueang (THA) | XO | O | O | XXX | | | | | | | 1.61 | 747 | |
| 9 | Nandini Agasara (IND) | O | O | XXO | XXX | | | | | | | 1.61 | 747 | |
| 10 | Yuki Yamasaki (JPN) | XO | XXO | XXO | XXX | | | | | | | 1.61 | 747 | |

=== Shot put ===
| Rank | Athlete | Attempt | | | Result | Points | Notes |
| Rank | Athlete | 1 | 2 | 3 | Result | Points | Notes |
|---|---|---|---|---|---|---|---|
| 1 | Zheng Ninali (CHN) | 13.30 | 13.82 | 13.60 | 13.82 | 782 | |
| 2 | Yuki Yamasaki (JPN) | 12.19 | 13.20 | 12.94 | 13.20 | 741 | |
| 3 | Ekaterina Voronina (UZB) | 12.60 | 12.98 | 12.73 | 12.98 | 726 | |
| 4 | Chen Cai-juan (TPE) | 11.74 | 11.98 | 12.70 | 12.70 | 707 | |
| 5 | Liu Jingyi (CHN) | 12.30 | 12.20 | 12.69 | 12.69 | 707 | |
| 6 | Swapna Barman (IND) | 12.27 | 11.97 | 11.85 | 12.27 | 679 | |
| 7 | Karin Odama (JPN) | 12.14 | 11.99 | 12.01 | 12.14 | 670 | |
| 8 | Nandini Agasara (IND) | 12.11 | 11.95 | 11.86 | 12.11 | 668 | |
| 9 | Sunisa Khotseemueang (THA) | 9.11 | 10.46 | 11.06 | 11.06 | 599 | |
| 10 | Sarah Dequinan (PHI) | 10.19 | 10.47 | 9.72 | 10.47 | 560 | |

=== 200 metres ===
- Wind – Heat 1: +1.6 m/s
- Wind – Heat 2: +1.0 m/s

| Rank | Heat | Athlete | Time | Points | Notes |
|---|---|---|---|---|---|
| 1 | 2 | Nandini Agasara (IND) | 24.47 | 936 | |
| 2 | 1 | Zheng Ninali (CHN) | 25.01 | 886 | |
| 3 | 2 | Ekaterina Voronina (UZB) | 25.45 | 846 | |
| 4 | 2 | Yuki Yamasaki (JPN) | 25.52 | 840 | |
| 5 | 2 | Chen Cai-juan (TPE) | 25.80 | 815 | |
| 6 | 2 | Liu Jingyi (CHN) | 25.86 | 809 | |
| 7 | 1 | Karin Odama (JPN) | 25.95 | 802 | |
| 8 | 1 | Sarah Dequinan (PHI) | 26.04 | 794 | |
| 9 | 1 | Swapna Barman (IND) | 26.16 | 783 | |
| 10 | 1 | Sunisa Khotseemueang (THA) | 26.90 | 720 | |

=== Long jump ===
| Rank | Athlete | Attempt | | | Result | Points | Notes |
| Rank | Athlete | 1 | 2 | 3 | Result | Points | Notes |
|---|---|---|---|---|---|---|---|
| 1 | Zheng Ninali (CHN) | X | 6.07 +0.5 | X | 6.07 | 871 | |
| 2 | Ekaterina Voronina (UZB) | 5.95 +0.2 | 4.13 −0.1 | X | 5.95 | 834 | |
| 3 | Nandini Agasara (IND) | 5.91; 0.0 | 5.77; 0.0 | 5.94 +0.1 | 5.94 | 831 | |
| 4 | Chen Cai-juan (TPE) | 5.78 +0.1 | X | 5.76 +0.3 | 5.78 | 783 | |
| 5 | Sarah Dequinan (PHI) | 5.63 +0.5 | 5.77 −0.5 | 5.47 −0.3 | 5.77 | 780 | |
| 6 | Liu Jingyi (CHN) | 5.59 −0.3 | X | 5.72 +0.1 | 5.72 | 765 | |
| 7 | Swapna Barman (IND) | 5.63; 0.0 | 3.36 +1.2 | 5.71 −0.6 | 5.71 | 762 | |
| 8 | Karin Odama (JPN) | X | 5.53; 0.0 | 5.70 +0.1 | 5.70 | 759 | |
| 9 | Yuki Yamasaki (JPN) | X | 5.63 +0.9 | X | 5.63 | 738 | |
| 10 | Sunisa Khotseemueang (THA) | X | 5.34 +0.4 | 5.21 −0.6 | 5.34 | 654 | |

=== Javelin throw ===
| Rank | Athlete | Attempt | | | Result | Points | Notes |
| Rank | Athlete | 1 | 2 | 3 | Result | Points | Notes |
|---|---|---|---|---|---|---|---|
| 1 | Ekaterina Voronina (UZB) | 49.76 | 48.47 | 49.75 | 49.76 | 855 | |
| 2 | Zheng Ninali (CHN) | 48.77 | X | X | 48.77 | 836 | |
| 3 | Liu Jingyi (CHN) | 47.16 | 45.77 | 44.60 | 47.16 | 805 | |
| 4 | Yuki Yamasaki (JPN) | 40.83 | 45.27 | 43.05 | 45.27 | 769 | |
| 5 | Swapna Barman (IND) | 43.78 | 45.13 | 41.91 | 45.13 | 766 | |
| 6 | Sarah Dequinan (PHI) | 40.50 | 43.34 | X | 43.34 | 731 | |
| 7 | Karin Odama (JPN) | 40.54 | 37.24 | 36.81 | 40.54 | 678 | |
| 8 | Chen Cai-juan (TPE) | 36.97 | 40.35 | 39.97 | 40.35 | 674 | |
| 9 | Nandini Agasara (IND) | X | 36.10 | 39.88 | 39.88 | 665 | |
| 10 | Sunisa Khotseemueang (THA) | 35.35 | 35.03 | 33.31 | 35.35 | 578 | |

=== 800 metres ===
| Rank | Athlete | Time | Points | Notes |
|---|---|---|---|---|
| 1 | Nandini Agasara (IND) | 2:15.33 | 888 | |
| 2 | Ekaterina Voronina (UZB) | 2:15.91 | 880 | |
| 3 | Swapna Barman (IND) | 2:16.74 | 868 | |
| 4 | Yuki Yamasaki (JPN) | 2:19.22 | 834 | |
| 5 | Karin Odama (JPN) | 2:20.65 | 815 | |
| 6 | Zheng Ninali (CHN) | 2:22.23 | 793 | |
| 7 | Liu Jingyi (CHN) | 2:30.54 | 686 | |
| 8 | Chen Cai-juan (TPE) | 2:30.91 | 682 | |
| 9 | Sarah Dequinan (PHI) | 2:37.62 | 600 | |
| 10 | Sunisa Khotseemueang (THA) | 2:39.42 | 580 | |

=== Summary ===
| Rank | Athlete | 100mH | HJ | SP | 200m | LJ | JT | 800m | Total | Notes |
|---|---|---|---|---|---|---|---|---|---|---|
| 1st place, gold medalist(s) | Zheng Ninali (CHN) | 1053 | 928 | 782 | 886 | 871 | 836 | 793 | 6149 | |
| 2nd place, silver medalist(s) | Ekaterina Voronina (UZB) | 912 | 1003 | 726 | 846 | 834 | 855 | 880 | 6056 | |
| 3rd place, bronze medalist(s) | Nandini Agasara (IND) | 977 | 747 | 668 | 936 | 831 | 665 | 888 | 5712 | |
| 4 | Swapna Barman (IND) | 995 | 855 | 679 | 783 | 762 | 766 | 868 | 5708 | |
| 5 | Yuki Yamasaki (JPN) | 947 | 747 | 741 | 840 | 738 | 769 | 834 | 5616 | |
| 6 | Karin Odama (JPN) | 990 | 891 | 670 | 802 | 759 | 678 | 815 | 5605 | |
| 7 | Liu Jingyi (CHN) | 910 | 855 | 707 | 809 | 765 | 805 | 686 | 5537 | |
| 8 | Chen Cai-juan (TPE) | 939 | 855 | 707 | 815 | 783 | 674 | 682 | 5455 | |
| 9 | Sarah Dequinan (PHI) | 871 | 818 | 560 | 794 | 780 | 731 | 600 | 5154 | |
| 10 | Sunisa Khotseemueang (THA) | 830 | 747 | 599 | 720 | 654 | 578 | 580 | 4708 | |
