= Liksy Joseph =

Indian heptathlete

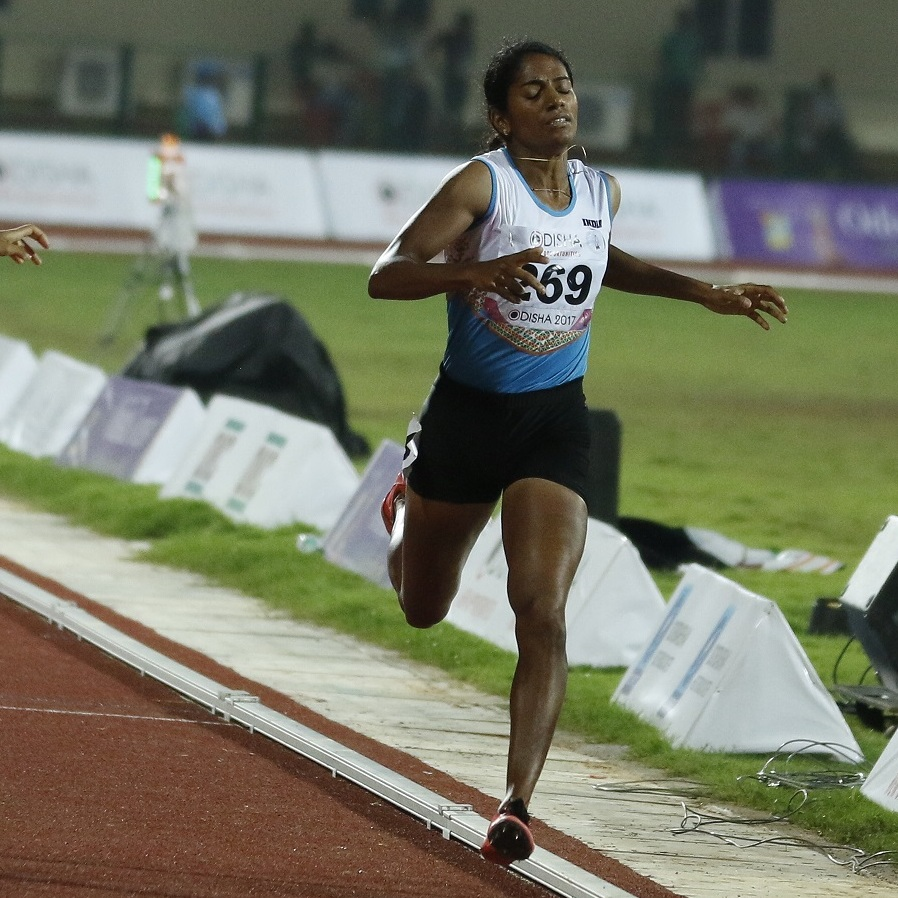
- in 2017
- Born: 17 February 1990 (age 36); Kerala, India
- Known for: Heptathlon

Liksy Joseph is an Indian athlete. She represents India in the heptathlon.

== Life ==
Liksy and Niksy were twins born to Gracy and K.M. Joseph in 1990 in Kerala.

She competed in the 2017 Asian Athletics Championships – Women's heptathlon. The race was won by her compatriot Swapna Barman and another teammate, Purnima Hembram, took the bronze.
