= 2017 Asian Athletics Championships – Women's heptathlon =

The women's heptathlon event at the 2017 Asian Athletics Championships was held on 8 and 9 July.

== Medalists ==
Gold	Silver	Bronze
Swapna Barman; India	Meg Hemphill; Japan	Purnima Hembram; India

== Results ==
=== 100 metres hurdles ===
Rank	Name	Nationality	Time	Points	Notes
1	Meg Hemphill	Japan	13.62	1033	
2	Purnima Hembram	India	13.75	1014	
3	Liou Ya-Jyun	Chinese Taipei	13.99	980	
4	Swapna Barman	India	13.99	980	
5	Eri Utsunomiya	Japan	14.24	945	
6	Liksy Joseph	India	14.65	888	
7	Nadezhda Kirnos	Kazakhstan	14.94	850	
8	Aleksandra Yurkevskaya	Uzbekistan	15.12	826	

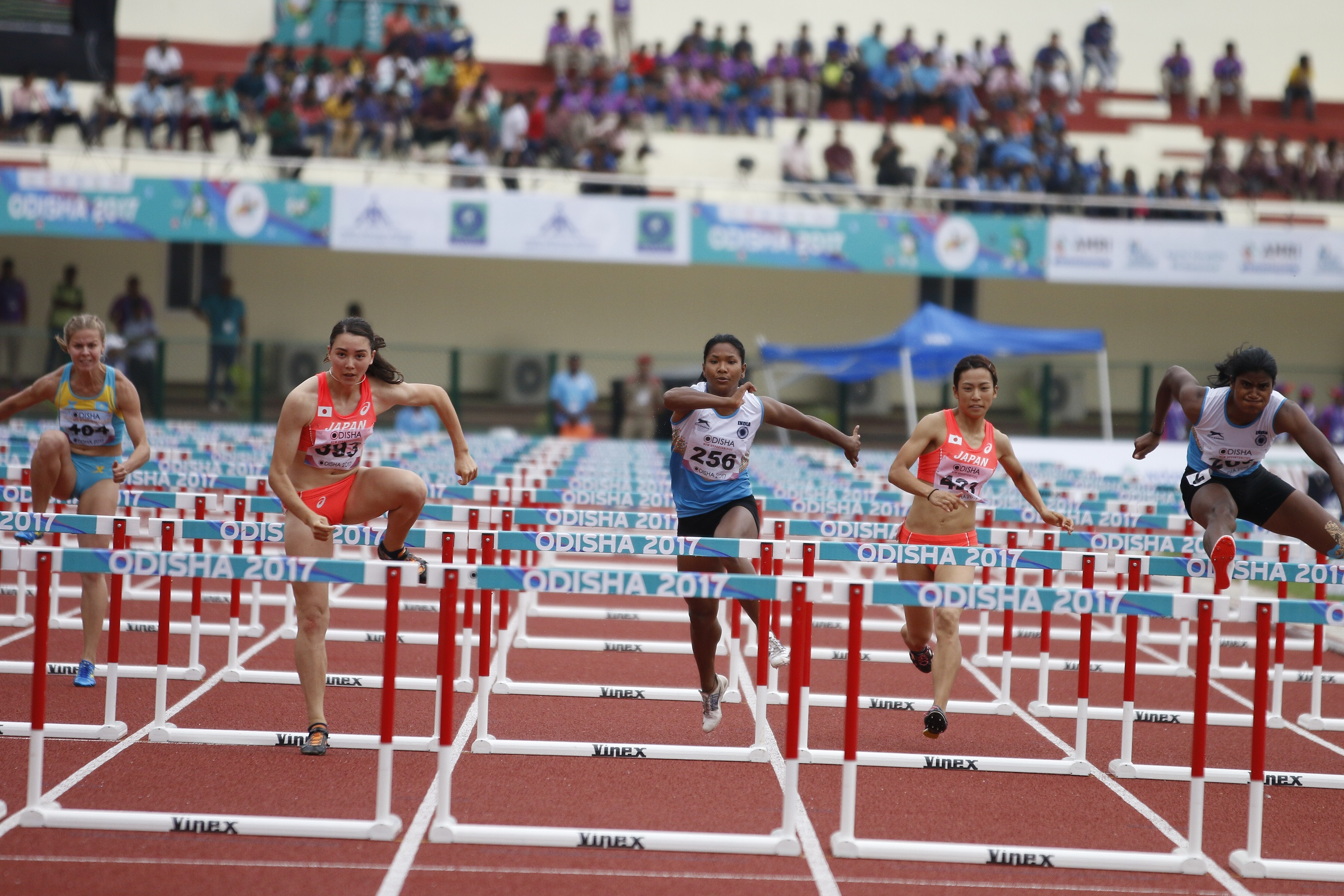
The 100 metres hurdles

=== High jump ===
Rank	Athlete	Nationality	1.50	1.53	1.56	1.59	1.62	1.65	1.68	1.71	1.74	1.77	1.80	1.83	1.86	1.89	Result	Points	Notes	Total
1	Swapna Barman	India	–	–	–	–	–	o	o	o	o	o	xo	xo	xxo	xxx	1.86	1054		2034
2	Aleksandra Yurkevskaya	Uzbekistan	–	–	–	–	o	o	o	o	o	xo	xxx				1.77	941		1767
3	Meg Hemphill	Japan	-	-	-	o	o	o	o	o	xxx						1.71	867		1900
4	Liksy Joseph	India	o	o	o	o	o	xo	xxo	xxo	xxx						1.71	867		1755
5	Purnima Hembram	India	o	o	o	o	o	xxo	o	o	xxx						1.71	867		1881
6	Eri Utsunomiya	Japan	-	o	o	xo	o	o	xxx								1.65	795		1740
7	Liou Ya-Jyun	Chinese Taipei	–	-	xo	o	xo	xxx									1.62	759		1739
8	Nadezhda Kirnos	Kazakhstan	o	o	o	o	xxo	xxx									1.62	759		1609

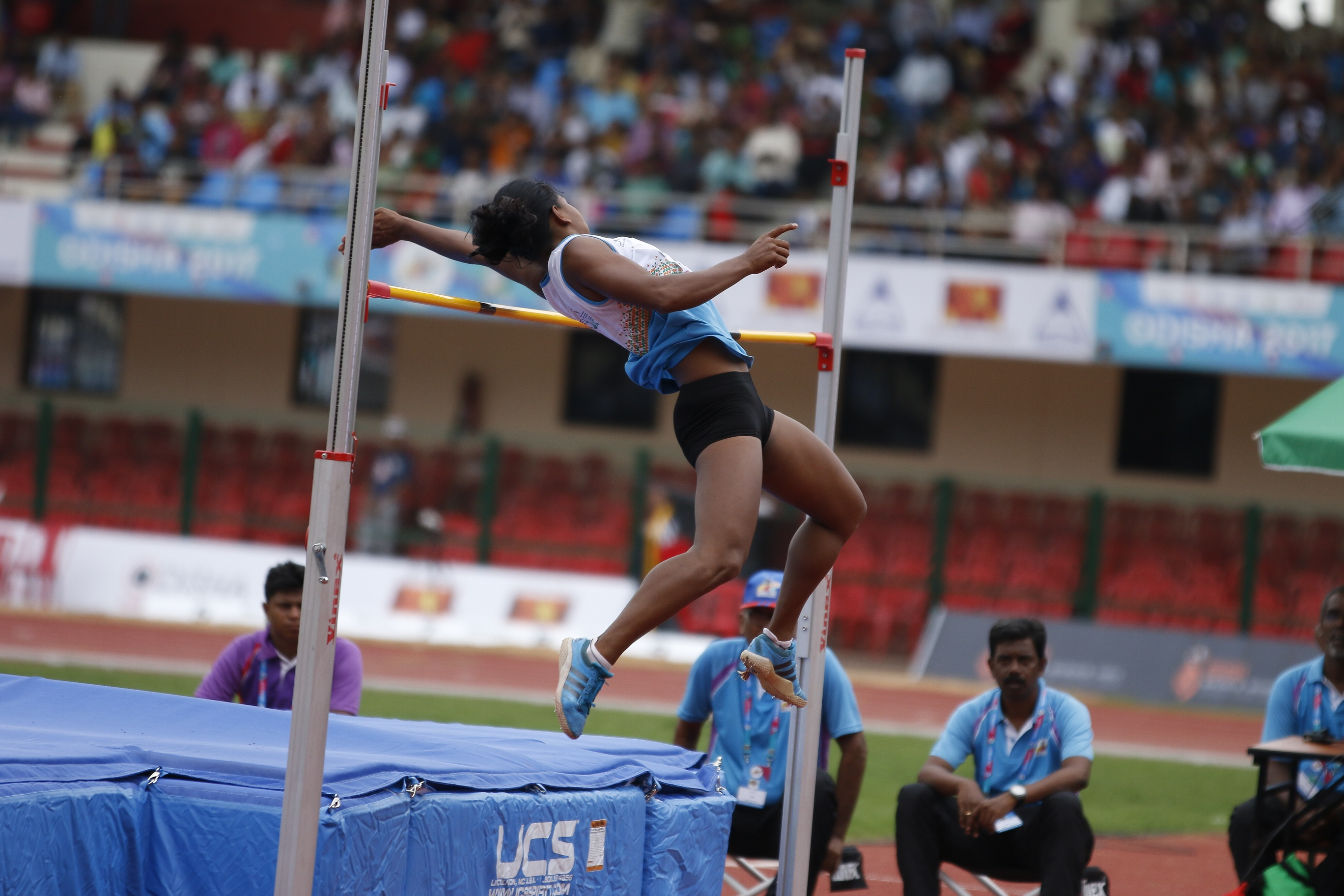
Swapna Barman high jumping

=== Shot put ===
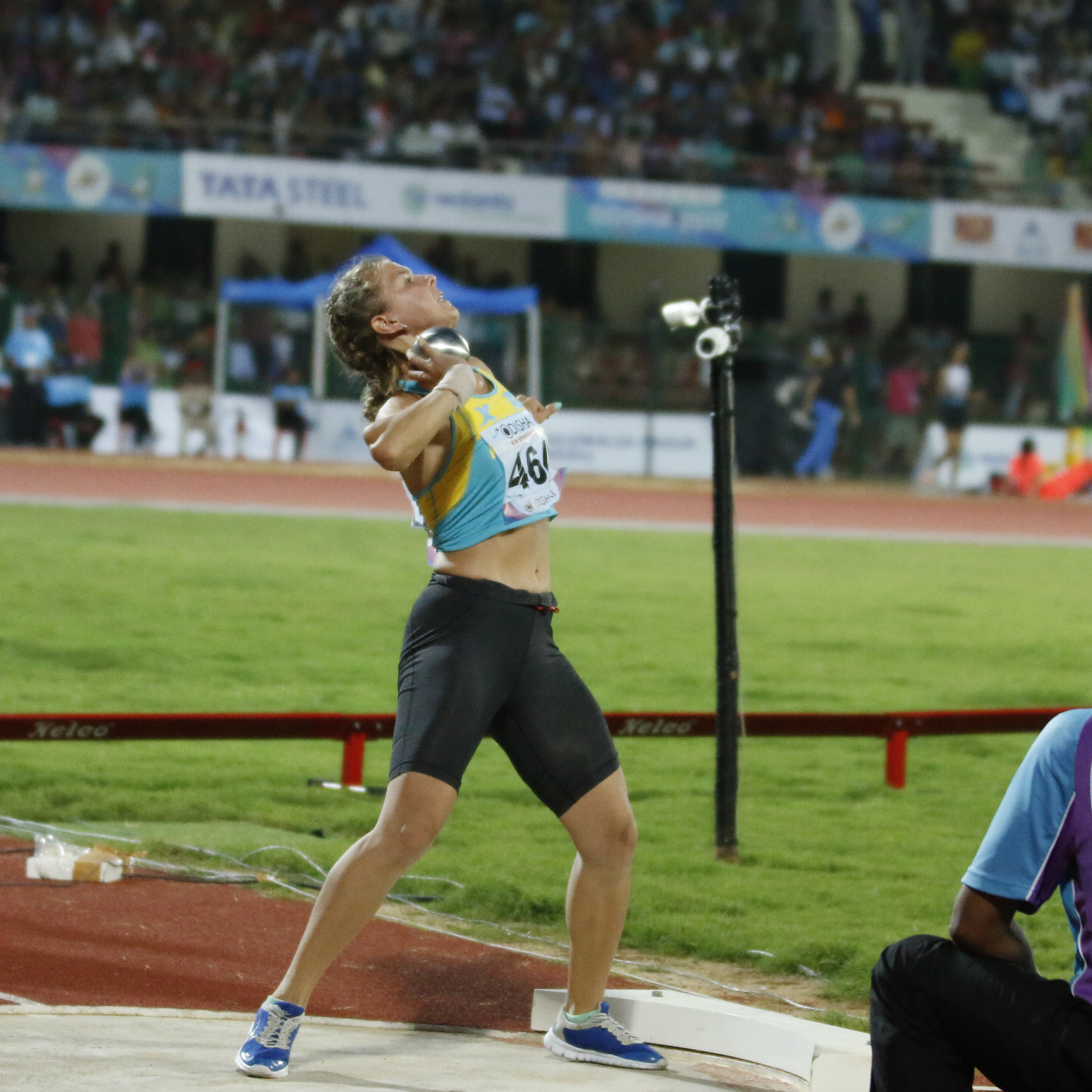
Nadezhda Kirnos during shot put

Rank	Athlete	Nationality	Result	Points	Notes	Total
1	Purnima Hembram	India	11.84	651		2532
2	Meg Hemphill	Japan	11.51	629		2529
3	Swapna Barman	India	11.39	621		2655
4	Aleksandra Yurkevskaya	Uzbekistan	11.27	613		2380
5	Nadezhda Kirnos	Kazakhstan	10.83	584		2193
6	Eri Utsunomiya	Japan	10.78	581		2321
7	Liksy Joseph	India	10.59	569		2324
	Liou Ya-Jyun	Chinese Taipei	DNS	0		1739

=== 200 metres ===
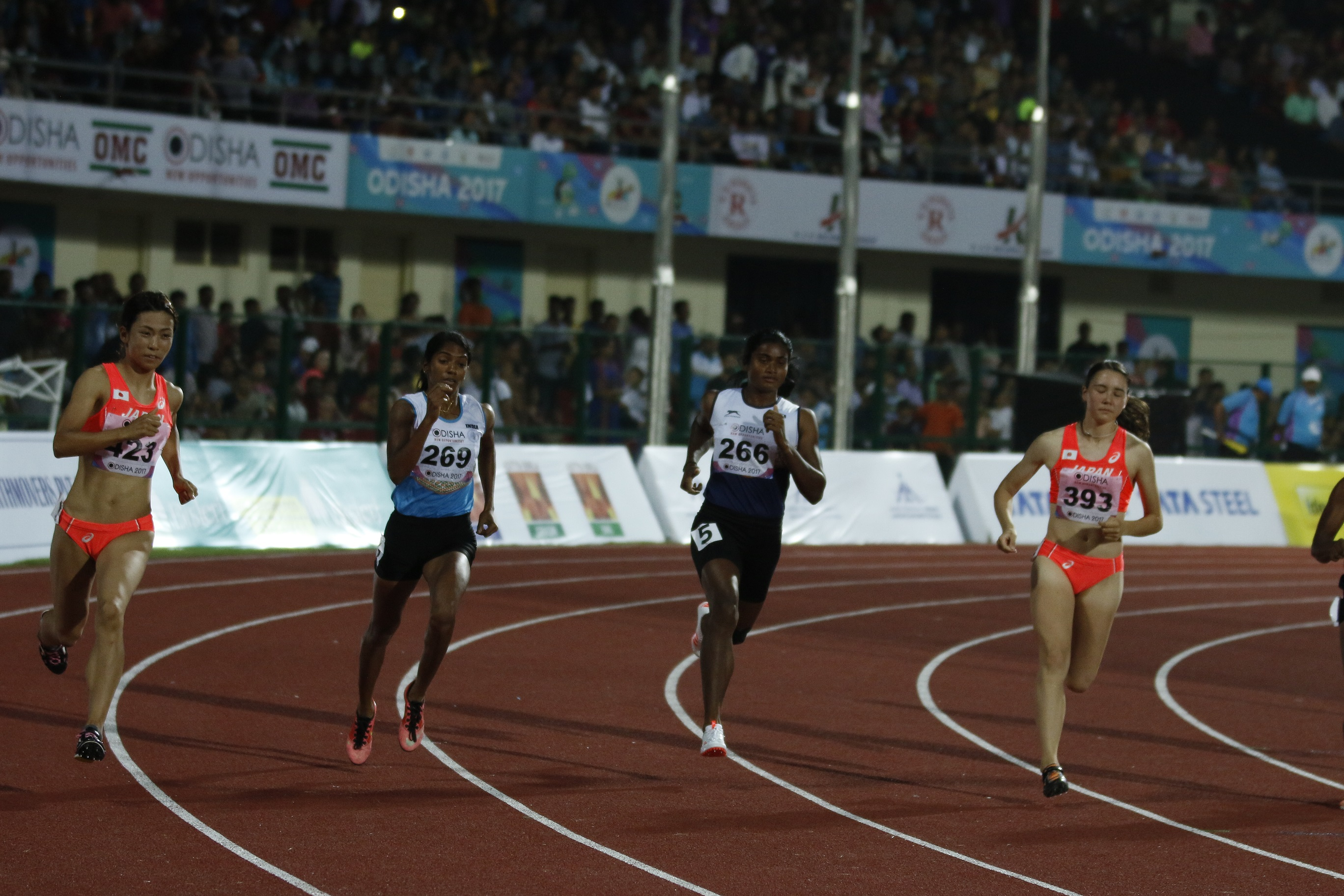
The 200 metres

Rank	Name	Nationality	Time	Points	Notes	Total
1	Purnima Hembram	India	24.86	900		3432
2	Liksy Joseph	India	25.02	885		3209
3	Meg Hemphill	Japan	25.06	881		3410
4	Nadezhda Kirnos	Kazakhstan	25.11	877		3070
5	Eri Utsunomiya	Japan	25.33	857		3178
6	Swapna Barman	India	26.11	788		3443
7	Aleksandra Yurkevskaya	Uzbekistan	27.41	678		3058
	Liou Ya-Jyun	Chinese Taipei	DNS	0		1739

=== Long jump ===
Rank	Athlete	Nationality	Result	Points	Notes	Total
1	Liksy Joseph	India	6.19	908		4117
2	Meg Hemphill	Japan	6.06	868		4278
3	Swapna Barman	India	6.03	859		4302
4	Eri Utsunomiya	Japan	6.00	850		4028
5	Purnima Hembram	India	5.97	840		4272
6	Nadezhda Kirnos	Kazakhstan	5.93	828		3898
	Aleksandra Yurkevskaya	Uzbekistan	DNS	0		3058
	Liou Ya-Jyun	Chinese Taipei	DNS	0		1739

=== Javelin throw ===
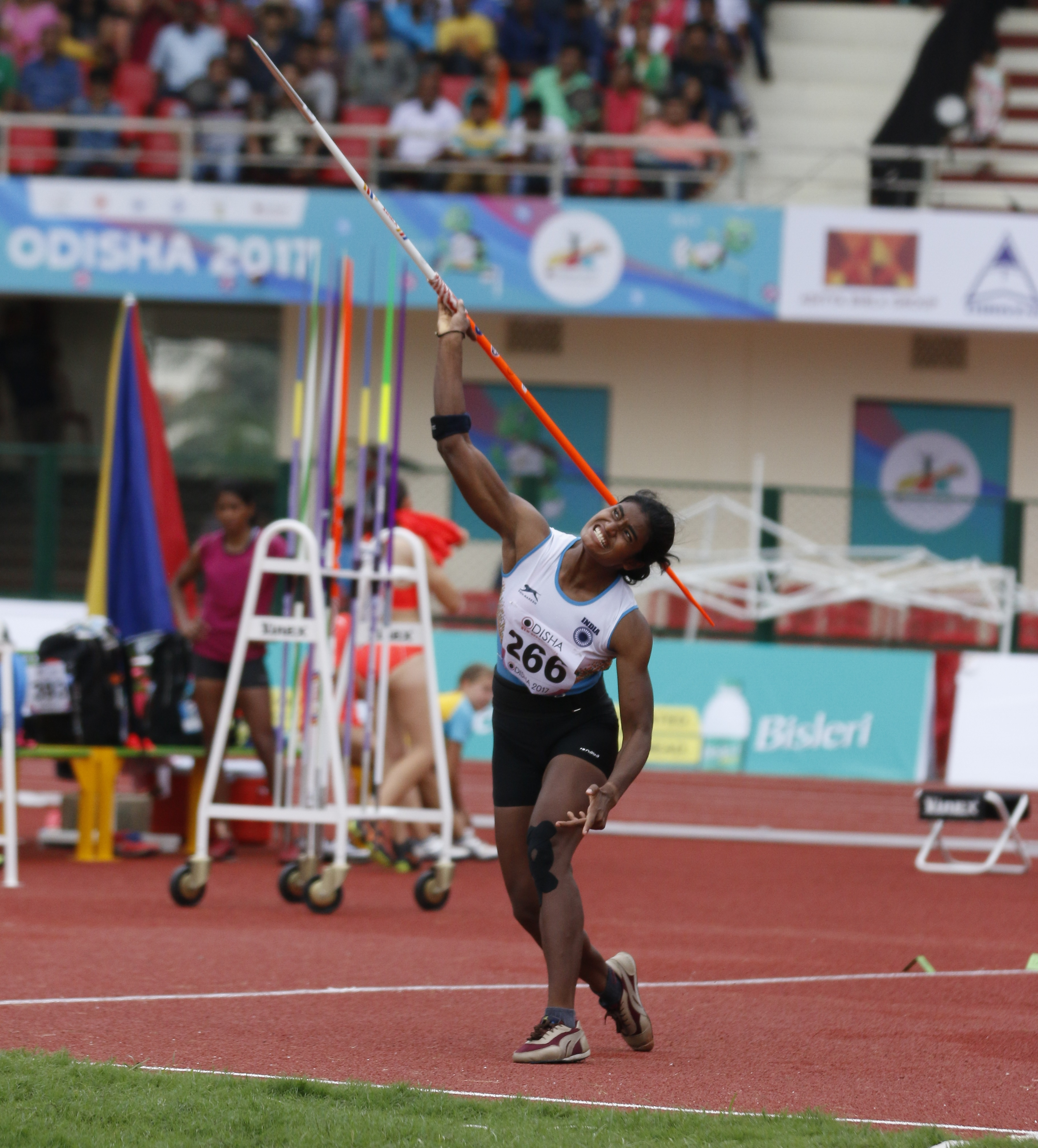
Purnima Hembram throwing the javelin

Rank	Athlete	Nationality	Result	Points	Notes	Total
1	Swapna Barman	India	45.03	764		5066
2	Meg Hemphill	Japan	43.10	727		5005
3	Purnima Hembram	India	39.08	650		4922
4	Eri Utsunomiya	Japan	37.21	614		4642
5	Nadezhda Kirnos	Kazakhstan	36.74	605		4503
6	Liksy Joseph	India	35.29	577		4694
	Aleksandra Yurkevskaya	Uzbekistan	DNS	0		3058
	Liou Ya-Jyun	Chinese Taipei	DNS	0		1739

=== 800 metres ===
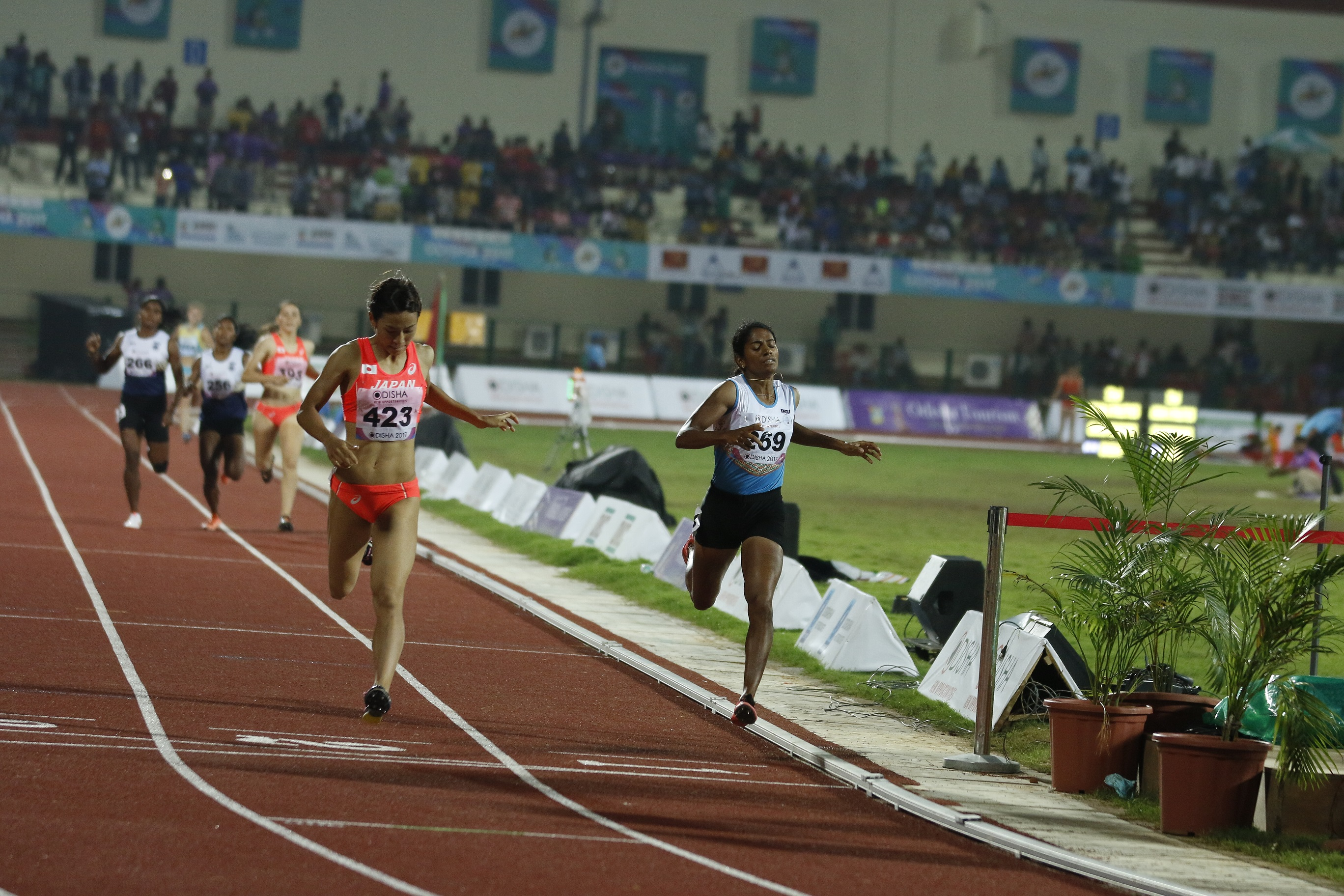
The 800 metres

Rank	Name	Nationality	Time	Points	Notes	Overall
1	Eri Utsunomiya	Japan	2:11.41	944		5586
2	Liksy Joseph	India	2:11.49	940		5633
3	Meg Hemphill	Japan	2:16.02	878		5883
4	Swapna Barman	India	2:16.20	876		5942
5	Purnima Hembram	India	2:16.21	876		5798
6	Nadezhda Kirnos	Kazakhstan	2:21.60	802		5305
	Aleksandra Yurkevskaya	Uzbekistan	DNS	0		3058
	Liou Ya-Jyun	Chinese Taipei	DNS	0		1739

=== Final standings ===
The highest mark recorded in each event is highlighted in yellow

Rank	Athlete	Nationality	100m H	HJ	SP	200m	LJ	JT	800m	Points	Notes
1st place, gold medalist(s)	Swapna Barman	India	13.99	1.86	11.39	26.11	6.03	45.03	2:16.20	5942	
2nd place, silver medalist(s)	Meg Hemphill	Japan	13.62	1.71	11.51	25.06	6.06	43.10	2:16.02	5883	
3rd place, bronze medalist(s)	Purnima Hembram	India	13.75	1.71	11.84	24.86	5.97	39.08	2:16.21	5798	
4	Liksy Joseph	India	14.65	1.71	10.59	25.02	6.19	35.29	2:11.69	5633	
5	Eri Utsunomiya	Japan	14.24	1.65	10.78	25.33	6.00	37.21	2:11.41	5586	
6	Nadezhda Kirnos	Kazakhstan	14.94	1.62	10.83	25.11	5.93	36.74	2:21.60	5305	
	Aleksandra Yurkevskaya	Uzbekistan	15.12	1.77	11.27	27.41	–	–	–	DNF	
	Liou Ya-Jyun	Chinese Taipei	13.99	1.62	DNS	–	–	–	–	DNF	
