= 2021 Federation Cup Senior Athletics Championships =

- Dates: 15–19 March
- Host city: Patiala
- Venue: Netaji Subhas National Institute of Sports
- Events: 38

The 2021 Federation Cup Senior Athletics Championships was the 24th edition of the national championship in outdoor track and field for India. It was held on 15–19 March at the Netaji Subhas National Institute of Sports in Patiala.

Three Indian national records were set at the competition. Kamalpreet Kaur won the women's discus throw with a record 65.06 m – the first Indian woman to throw beyond 65 metres. M. Sreeshankar added six centimetres to his own national record to win the men's long jump. In the women's javelin throw, Annu Rani's winning mark of 63.24 m added almost a metre to her previous record.

== Results ==
=== Men ===
Event	Gold		Silver		Bronze	
100 metres	Gurindervir Singh	10.32 s	V.K. Elakkiadasan	10.43 s	Krishna Kumar Rane	10.56 s
200 metres	V.K. Elakkiadasan	21.19 s PB	Akshay Nain	21.27 s	A. Vignesh	21.57 s
400 metres	Amoj Jacob	45.68 s PB	Naganathan Pandi	46.09 s PB	Arokia Rajiv	46.52 s
800 metres	Krishan Kumar	1:48.48 min PB	Ankesh Chaudhary	1:48.65 min PB	Annu Kumar	1:49.25 min PB
1500 metres	Ajay Kumar Saroj	3:45.61 min	Harendra Kumar	3:46.28 min PB	Manjit Singh	3:47.22 min
5000 metres	Amit Jangid	14:05.30 min PB	Abhishek Pal	14:08.59 min SB	Puneet Yadav	14:08.80 min PB
10,000 metres	Abhishek Pal	28:47.49 min SB	Kartik Kumar	29:48.21 min PB	Arjun Kumar	29:49.46 min SB
110 m hurdles	Veeramani Palani	14.57 s PB	Srikanth Madhyastha	14.85 s	Yashwanth Kumar	15.01 s
400 m hurdles	Dharun Ayyasamy	50.16 s	Santhosh Kumar Tamilarasan	51.49 s	K. Sathish	52.11 s
3000 m s'chase	Avinash Sable	8:20.20 min PB	Shankar Lal Swami	8:34.33 min PB	Rajkumar	8:49.96 min PB
High jump	Sarvesh Anil Kushare	2.15 m	J. Aadarsh Ram	2.10 m	Sidharth Yadav Geo Jose	2.10 m
Pole vault	Parshant Singh	5.10 m =PB	Lakshay	5.05 m PB	Anas Babu	4.90 m
Long jump	M.Shreeshankar	8.26 m NR	Muhammed Anees Yahiya	8.00 m PB	Lokesh Sathyanathan	7.60 m
Triple jump	Karthik Unnikrishnan	16.73 m	Abdulla Aboobacker	16.59 m	Eldhose Paul	16.53 m
Shot put	Tejinder Pal Singh Toor	20.58 m	Karanveer Singh	18.98 m	Davinder Singh	18.04 m
Discus throw	Kripal Singh Batth	59.04 m	Vazeer	56.40 m PB	Abhinav	55.79 m PB
Hammer throw	Gurmeet Singh	69.97 m PB	Jaswinder Singh	63.22 m PB	Taranveer Singh	62.75 m
Javelin throw	Neeraj Chopra	87.80 m	Yashvir Singh	79.31 m PB	Rohit Yadav	78.88 m
Decathlon	Usaid Khan	6820 pts PB	Navjor Singh	6649 pts PB	Umesh Lamba	6632 pts PB

=== Women ===
Event	Gold		Silver		Bronze	
100 metres	Sekar Dhana Lakshmi	11.38 s PB	Dutee Chand	11.58 s	Archana Suseentran	11.76 s
200 metres	Hima Das	23.21 s	Sekar Dhana Lakshmi	23.39 s	Archana Suseentran	23.60 s
400 metres	M. R. Poovamma	53.57 s	Venkatesan Subha	54.48 s	Kiran	54.55 s
800 metres	KM. Chanda	2:02.57 min PB	Lili Das	2:02.98 min PB	M. R. Poovamma	2:03.35 min PB
1500 metres	Harmilan Kaur Bains	4:08.70 min PB	Palakeezh Unnikrishnan Chitra	4:17.56 min	Durga Pramod Deore	4:27.87 min
5000 metres	Parul Chaudhary	16:03.23 min	Sanjivani Jadhav	16:08.36 min	Komal Jagadale	16:18.48 min
10,000 metres	Savita Pal	33:59.35 min PB	Sanjivani Jadhav	34:01.26 min SB	Kavita Yadav	34:04.45 min PB
100 m hurdles	Chandrasekar Kanimozhi	13.63 s PB	Nandini Agasara	13.88 s PB	Vithya Ramraj	14.08 s
400 m hurdles	Vithya Ramraj	59.59 s	Nanhi	59.94 s PB	V. Krishnan Salini	60.57 s
3000 m s'chase	Parul Chaudhary	10:01.06 min PB	Komal Jagadale	10:05.43 min	Cintha	10:36.45 min
High jump	Gracena Glistus Mery	1.84 m PB	Rekha	1.75 m	G. Giji George Stephen	1.70 m PB
Pole vault	P. Rosy Meena	3.90 m PB	Vengatesh Pavithra	3.80 m =PB	Jaison Mariya	3.70 m
Long jump	Priyanka Kerketta	6.10 m	Rintu Mathew	6.07 m	Sherin Abdul Gaffoor	6.07 m
Triple jump	Renu Grewal	13.39 m	B. Aishwarya	13.16 m	R. Aishwarya	13.05 m PB
Shot put	Kiran Baliyan	16.45 m	Manpreet Kaur	15.65 m	Sonal Goyal	15.09 m
Discus throw	Kamalpreet Kaur	65.06 m NR	Seema Punia	62.64 m	Sonal Goyal	52.11 m PB
Hammer throw	Sarita Romit Singh	56.62 m	Jyoti Jakhar Rana	54.97 m	Rekha Singh	54.04 m
Javelin throw	Annu Rani	63.24 m NR	Sanjana Choudchary	54.55 m PB	Sharmila Kumari	50.78 m
Heptathlon	Swapna Barman	5636 pts	George Mareena	5516 pts PB	Sonu Kumari	5050 pts PB
