= 2025 Asian Athletics Championships – Women's heptathlon =

Women's heptathlon at the 2025 Asian Athletics Championships
- Venue: Gumi Civic Stadium
- Location: Gumi, South Korea
- Dates: 29-30 May
- Competitors: 9 from 7 nations
- Winning score: 5941

Medalists
gold medal	Nandini Agasara	India
silver medal	Liu Jingyi	China
bronze medal	Chen Tsai-chuan	Chinese Taipei

The women's heptathlon event at the 2025 Asian Athletics Championships was held on 29 and 30 May.

== Records ==
Records before the 2025 Asian Athletics Championships
Record	Athlete (nation)	Points	Location	Date
World record	Jackie Joyner-Kersee (USA)	7291	Seoul, South Korea	24 September 1998
Asian record	Ghada Shouaa (SYR)	6492	Götzis, Austria	26 May 1996
Championship record	Ghada Shouaa (SYR)	6259	Manila, Philippines	2 December 1993
World leading	Martha Araújo (COL)	6396	Mar del Plata, Argentina	27 April 2025
Asian leading	No scores recorded			

== Results ==
=== 100 metres ===
Place	Athlete	Nation	Time	Points	Notes
1	Nandini Agasara	India	13.67	1026	
2	Fatemeh Mohitizade	Iran	14.20	950	
3	Liu Jingyi	China	14.23	946	
4	Chen Tsai-chuan	Chinese Taipei	14.35	929	
5	Ugiloy Norboeva	Uzbekistan	14.50	909	
6	Lin Pei-hsuan	Chinese Taipei	14.60	895	
7	Han Iseul	South Korea	14.67	886	
8	Alina Chistyakova	Kazakhstan	14.76	874	
9	Yekaterina Avdeyenko	Kazakhstan	33.47	0	

=== High jump ===
Place	Athlete	Nation	1.45	1.48	1.51	1.54	1.57	1.60	1.63	1.66	1.69	1.72	1.75	Result	Points	Notes	Total
1	Liu Jingyi	China	-	-	-	o	-	o	o	o	o	xo	xxx	1.72 m	879		1825
2	Alina Chistyakova	Kazakhstan	-	-	o	o	o	xo	xo	o	o	xo	xxx	1.72 m	879		1753
3	Chen Tsai-chuan	Chinese Taipei	-	-	-	-	-	-	o	o	o	xxo	xxx	1.72 m	879		1808
4	Lin Pei-hsuan	Chinese Taipei	-	-	-	-	-	-	xo	o	o	xxx		1.69 m	842		1737
5	Nandini Agasara	India	-	-	-	o	o	o	o	xo	xxo	xxx		1.69 m	842		1868
6	Fatemeh Mohitizade	Iran	-	-	-	-	-	o	o	o	xxx			1.66 m	806		1756
7	Ugiloy Norboeva	Uzbekistan	-	-	-	-	-	o	xxo	xxo	xxx			1.66 m	806		1715
8	Han Iseul	South Korea	-	-	-	o	o	o	o	xxx				1.63 m	771		1657
—	Yekaterina Avdeyenko	Kazakhstan												DNS			

=== Shot put ===
Place	Athlete	Nation	#1	#2	#3	Result	Points	Notes	Total
1	Chen Tsai-chuan	Chinese Taipei	12.50	12.50	13.80	13.80 m	781		2589
2	Nandini Agasara	India	13.16	13.54	13.53	13.54 m	763		2631
3	Liu Jingyi	China	13.42	12.60	12.82	13.42 m	755		2580
4	Ugiloy Norboeva	Uzbekistan	11.35	11.60	11.60	11.60 m	635		2350
5	Fatemeh Mohitizade	Iran	10.56	10.02	11.31	11.31 m	616		2372
6	Alina Chistyakova	Kazakhstan	10.61	x	x	10.61 m	569		2322
7	Lin Pei-hsuan	Chinese Taipei	10.19	10.33	10.44	10.44 m	558		2295
8	Han Iseul	South Korea	9.46	10.20	9.82	10.20 m	543		2200

=== 200 metres ===
Place	Athlete	Nation	Time	Points	Notes	Total
1	Nandini Agasara	India	24.02	979		3610
2	Han Iseul	South Korea	25.23	866		3066
3	Alina Chistyakova	Kazakhstan	25.34	856		3178
4	Liu Jingyi	China	25.61	832		3412
5	Chen Tsai-chuan	Chinese Taipei	25.73	821		3410
6	Ugiloy Norboeva	Uzbekistan	26.37	765		3115
7	Lin Pei-hsuan	Chinese Taipei	27.48	672		2967
8	Fatemeh Mohitizade	Iran	DNF	0		2372
			Wind: (−0.6 m/s)			

=== Long jump ===
Place	Athlete	Nation	#1	#2	#3	Result	Points	Notes	Total
1	Nandini Agasara	India	6.04 (+1.3 m/s)	5.98 (+0.4 m/s)	6.13 (+1.2 m/s)	6.13 m (+1.2 m/s)	890		4500
2	Han Iseul	South Korea	6.00 (+1.1 m/s)	5.99 (+1.4 m/s)	5.79 (+1.2 m/s)	6.00 m (+1.1 m/s)	850		3916
3	Liu Jingyi	China	5.81 (+0.8 m/s)	5.65 (+0.4 m/s)	5.83 (+1.9 m/s)	5.83 m (+1.9 m/s)	798		4210
4	Alina Chistyakova	Kazakhstan	5.73 (+0.4 m/s)	5.78 (+1.6 m/s)	5.66 (−0.1 m/s)	5.78 m (+1.6 m/s)	783		3961
5	Chen Tsai-chuan	Chinese Taipei	5.78 (+0.7 m/s)	5.70 (+0.2 m/s)	5.67 (+1.3 m/s)	5.78 m (+0.7 m/s)	783		4193
6	Ugiloy Norboeva	Uzbekistan	5.59 (+0.4 m/s)	x	5.20 (−0.2 m/s)	5.59 m (+0.4 m/s)	726		3841
7	Lin Pei-hsuan	Chinese Taipei	5.16 (+1.4 m/s)	5.04 (+1.5 m/s)	3.89 (+0.6 m/s)	5.16 m (+1.4 m/s)	603		3570

=== Javelin throw ===
Place	Athlete	Nation	#1	#2	#3	Result	Points	Notes	Total
1	Ugiloy Norboeva	Uzbekistan	42.22	51.47	53.41	53.41 m	926		4767
2	Liu Jingyi	China	43.35	43.98	52.08	52.08 m	900		5110
3	Chen Tsai-chuan	Chinese Taipei	35.42	41.47	41.72	41.72 m	700		4893
4	Han Iseul	South Korea	41.59	38.63	37.29	41.59 m	698		4614
5	Lin Pei-hsuan	Chinese Taipei	36.19	40.33	39.42	40.33 m	674		4244
6	Alina Chistyakova	Kazakhstan	34.51	x	34.44	34.51 m	562		4523
7	Nandini Agasara	India	34.18	33.12	30.98	34.18 m	556		5056

=== 800 metres ===
Place	Athlete	Nation	Time	Points	Notes	Total
1	Nandini Agasara	India	2:15.54	885		5941
2	Alina Chistyakova	Kazakhstan	2:24.05	769		5292
3	Liu Jingyi	China	2:24.87	759		5869
4	Han Iseul	South Korea	2:28.15	716		5330
5	Chen Tsai-chuan	Chinese Taipei	2:28.25	715		5608
6	Ugiloy Norboeva	Uzbekistan	2:29.91	694		5461
7	Lin Pei-hsuan	Chinese Taipei	2:46.26	503		4747

=== Final standings ===
The highest mark recorded in each event is highlighted in yellow

Place	Athlete	Nation	100m	HJ	SP	200m	LJ	JT	800m	Points	Notes
1st place, gold medalist(s)	Nandini Agasara	India	13.67	1.69	13.54	24.02	6.13 (+1.2 m/s)	34.18	2:15.54	5941	PB
2nd place, silver medalist(s)	Liu Jingyi	China	14.23	1.72	13.42	25.61	5.83 (+1.9 m/s)	52.08	2:24.87	5869	PB
3rd place, bronze medalist(s)	Chen Tsai-chuan	Chinese Taipei	14.35	1.72	13.80	25.73	5.78 (+0.7 m/s)	41.72	2:28.25	5608	
4	Ugiloy Norboeva	Uzbekistan	14.50	1.66	11.60	26.37	5.59 (+0.4 m/s)	53.41	2:29.91	5461	PB
5	Han Iseul	South Korea	14.67	1.63	10.20	25.23	6.00 (+1.1 m/s)	41.59	2:28.15	5330	PB
6	Alina Chistyakova	Kazakhstan	14.76	1.72	10.61	25.34	5.78 (+1.6 m/s)	34.51	2:24.05	5292	
7	Lin Pei-hsuan	Chinese Taipei	14.60	1.69	10.44	27.48	5.16 (+1.4 m/s)	40.33	2:46.26	4747	
—	Fatemeh Mohitizade	Iran	14.20	1.66	11.31	DNF	DNS	DNS	DNS	DNF	
—	Yekaterina Avdeyenko	Kazakhstan	33.47	DNS	DNS	DNS	DNS	DNS	DNS	DNF	
