= Kenza Sosse =

Qatari sprinter

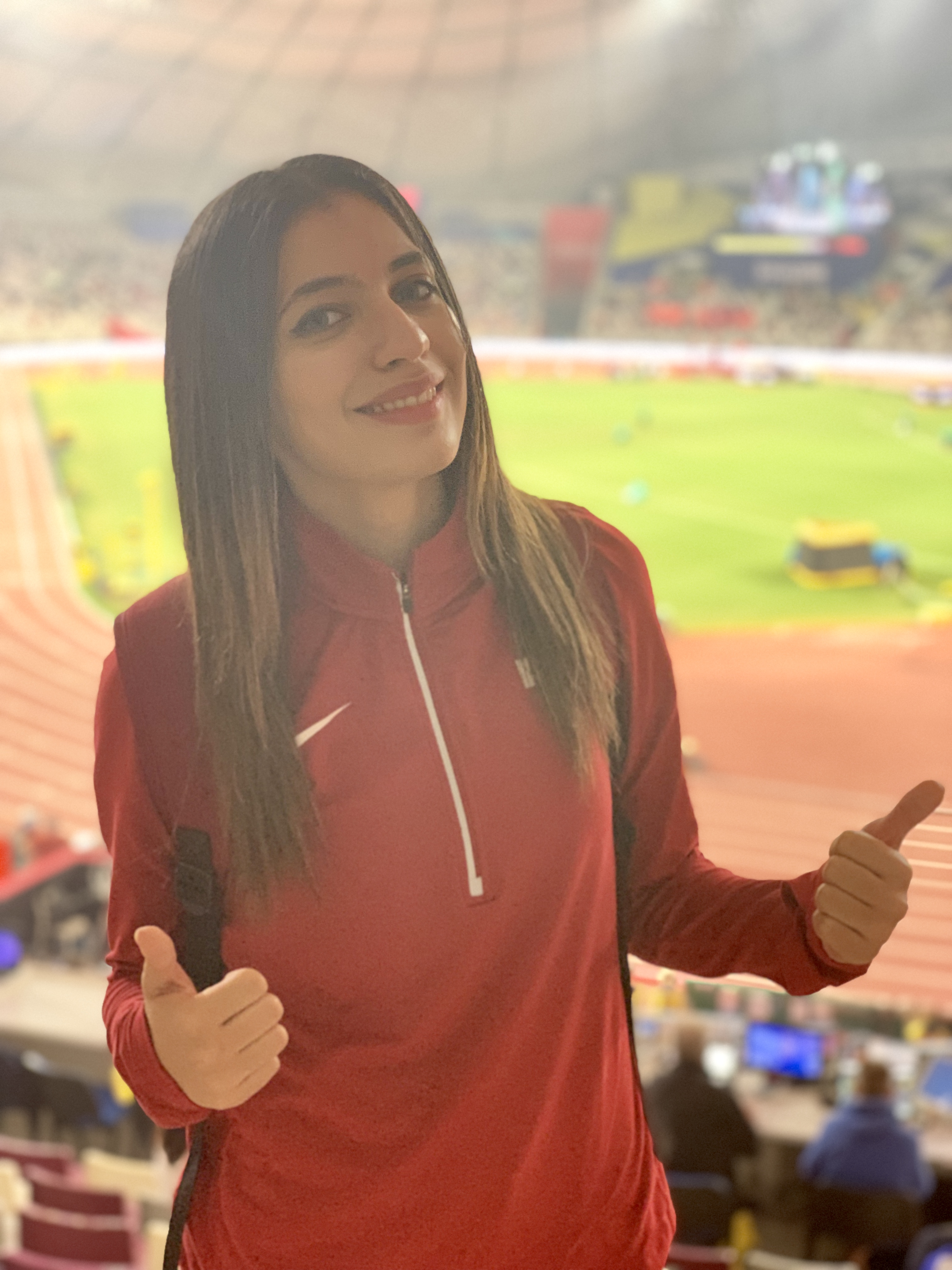

Personal information
- Nationality: Qatari
- Born: 10 November 1999 (age 26)

Sport
- Sport: Athletics
- Event: Sprinting

Kenza Sosse (born 10 November 1999) is a Qatari athlete. She competed in the women's 400 metres event at the 2019 World Athletics Championships. She did not advance to compete in the semi-finals.
