= Nandini Agasara =

Indian athlete

Personal information
- Nationality: Indian
- Born: 7 August 2003 (age 22) Secunderabad, Telangana, India
- Education: Osmania University
- Height: 1.76 m (5 ft 9 in)

Sport
- Sport: Track and field
- Event: Heptathlon

Achievements and titles
- Personal best: 5941 (2025)
Medal record
Women's athletics
Representing India
Asian Games
Bronze medal – third place	2022 Hangzhou	Heptathlon
Asian Championships
Gold medal – first place	2025 Gumi	Heptathlon

Nandini Agasara (born 7 August 2003) is an Indian heptathlete. She is the current Asian champion, having won the gold medal at the 2025 Asian Championships. She has also won the bronze medal at the 2022 Asian Games.

== Career ==
Nandini's top tournaments are given below:

- 2025: Gold medal in Heptathlon at the 2025 Asian Athletics Championships in Gumi, S. Korea.
- 2023: Bronze medal in Heptathlon at the 2022 Asian Games in Hangzhou, China. She did her personal best in the 200m on 30 September at the Hangzhou Asian Games Heptathlon event.
- 2022: In October, she won a silver in the 100m hurdles at the National Open Athletics Championships, Sree Kanteerava Outdoor Stadium, Bengaluru.
- 2022: In August, she finished seventh in the 100m hurdles at the World Athletics U20 Championships, Pascual Guerrero Stadium, Cali, Colombia, setting a new Under-20 national record.
- 2021: In June, she won silver at the National Inter-State Senior Athletics Championships, Patiala.
