= Nina Schultz =

Canadian-born Chinese track athlete (born 1998)

Zheng Ninali
Personal information
- Native name: 郑妮娜力
- Nationality: Chinese
- Born: Nina Li Schultz; November 12, 1998 (age 27) New Westminster, British Columbia, Canada
- Height: 178 cm (5 ft 10 in)
- Weight: 62 kg (137 lb)

Sport
- Sport: Track
- Events: Heptathlon; Pentathlon
- College team: Kansas State University; University of Georgia

Achievements and titles
- Personal bests: Heptathlon: 6358, Arona, Spain, 2021; Pentathlon: 4502, Lubbock, Texas, U.S., 2018
Medal record
Representing China
Asian Games
Gold medal – first place	2022 Hangzhou	Heptathlon
Asian Indoor Championships
Gold medal – first place	2024 Tehran	Pentathlon
Representing Canada
Commonwealth Games
Silver medal – second place	2018 Gold Coast	Heptathlon

Nina Li Schultz (Chinese: 郑妮娜力; pinyin: Zhèng Nīnàlì; born November 12, 1998) is a Canadian-born Chinese track athlete who competes in the heptathlon and pentathlon. She was a Canadian citizen at birth and previously competed for Canada.

== Career ==
Schultz began training in athletics from a young age, and set a junior record in the indoor pentathlon in 2017 prior to being accepted to Kansas State University on a track scholarship. In her debut season in university athletics, Schultz won the bronze medal in the 2017 NCAA Indoor Championships' pentathlon event. At the 2018 NCAA Indoor Championships, she won the silver medal. At the 2018 NCAA Division I Outdoor Track and Field Championships she placed 7th in the heptathlon scoring 5,778 points.

Schultz competed as part of the Canadian team at the 2018 Commonwealth Games in the Gold Coast, Australia. She was the youngest member of the Canadian track and field team. In the heptathlon event, she set a new personal best of 6,133 points and won the silver medal, finishing 122 points behind gold medalist Katarina Johnson-Thompson of England.

Schultz returned to the competitive scene in 2021 under the Chinese flag to increase her personal best by over 200 points at the Spanish leg of the World Athletics Challenge – Combined Events. The athlete, now competing as Ninali Zheng, won the meeting with a score of 6,358 which moved her into qualification for the 2020 Summer Olympics.

=== Change of citizenship from Canada to China ===
Schultz became one of a handful of naturalized athletes of China; the athlete served a three year waiting period in compliance of the IAAF competition rules. World Athletics confirmed her eligibility to be a competing member of China's national team on April 12, 2021.

The Chinese press quoted her maternal grandmother Zheng Fengrong, who in 1957 set the women's world record in high jump 1.77m and is a celebrated athlete in China. Her brother Ty Schultz is a hockey player in Canada.
