= Eri Utsunomiya =

Japanese athlete

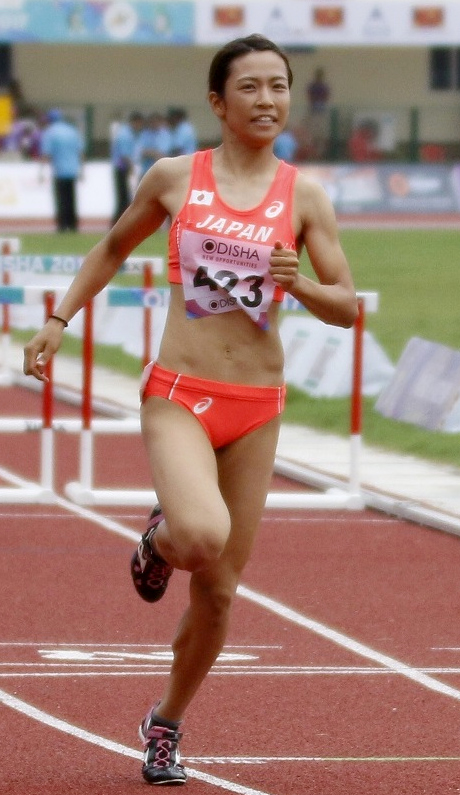
- Utsunomiya at the 2017 Asian Championships

Personal information
- Born: April 11, 1993 (age 33)
- Education: Sonoda Women's University
- Height: 167 cm (5 ft 6 in)
- Weight: 55 kg (121 lb)

Sport
- Sport: Athletics
- Event: Heptathlon

Eri Utsunomiya (宇都宮絵莉, Utsunomiya Eri; born April 11, 1993) is a Japanese track and field athlete, who mostly competes in heptathlon, sprint and hurdles. She placed fifth-seventh in various events at the 2015 and 2017 Asian Championships and 2018 Asian Games.
