= Purnima Hembram =

Indian track and field athlete

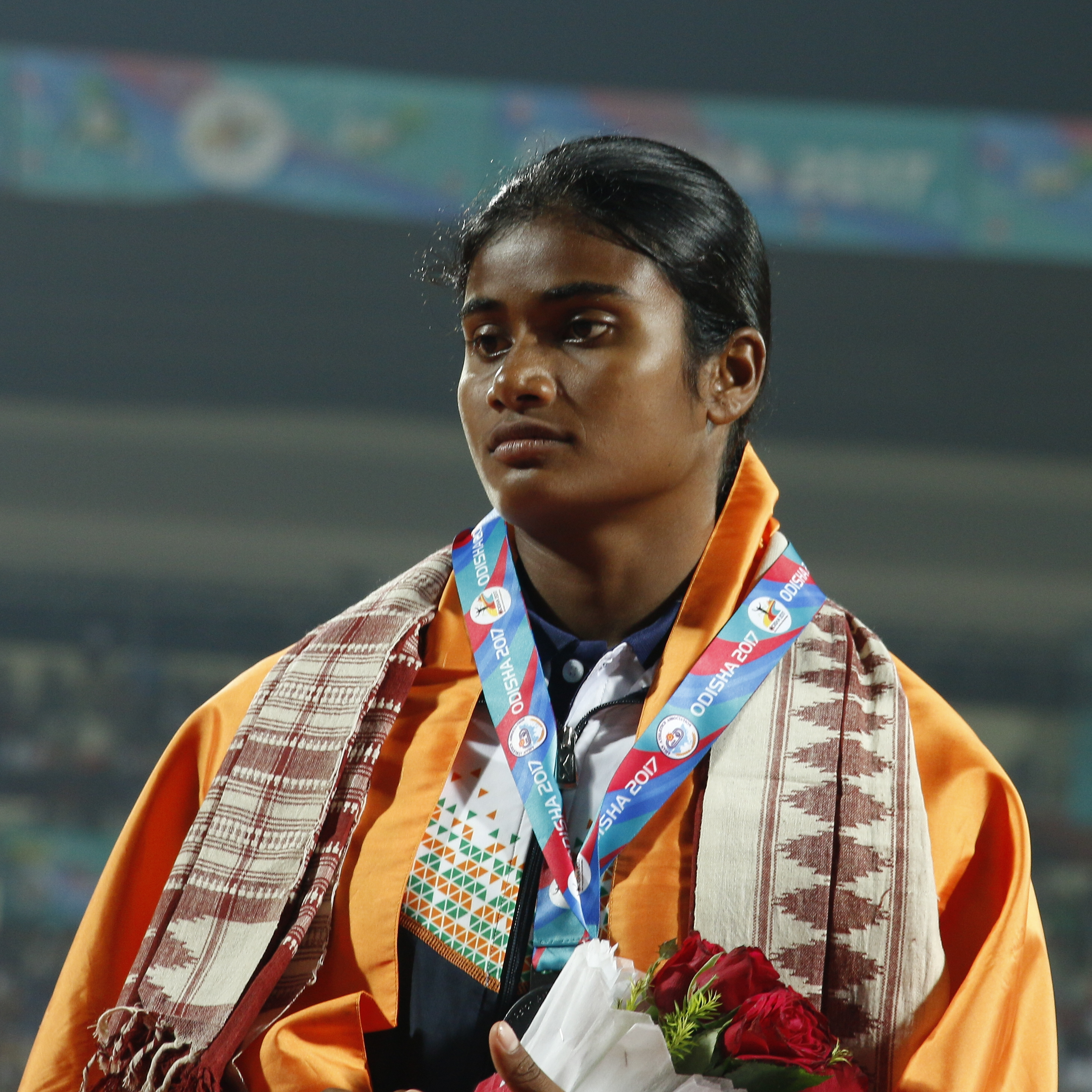
- Hembram at the 2017 Asian Championships

Personal information
- Born: 10 July 1993 (age 32) Mayurbhanj district, Odisha
- Education: Kalinga Institute of Social Sciences
- Height: 1.67 m (5 ft 6 in)
- Weight: 64 kg (141 lb)

Sport
- Sport: Athletics
- Event: Heptathlon
- Coached by: Sushanta Roy; Santosh Kumar Mahanta; Sanjay Garanayak
Medal record
Representing India
Asian Championships
| Bronze medal – third place | 2015 Wuhan | Heptathlon |
| Bronze medal – third place | 2017 Bhubaneswar | Heptathlon |
Asian Indoor and Martial Arts Games
| Gold medal – first place | 2017 Ashgabat | Pentathlon |

Purnima Hembram (born 10 July 1993) is an Indian track and field athlete. She won bronze medals in the heptathlon at the 2015 and 2017 Asian Championships and placed fourth at the 2018 Asian Games.

== Life ==
Hembram is from the Santhal tribe from Mayurbhanj, Odisha. She was born in 1993 to Dukhia and Dhania Hembram, and has two brothers, Durga and Doman and one sister Singo.

== Career ==
Hembram was declared Biju Patnaik Sportsman of the Year in 2015 and she was given a prize of 200,000 rupees.

In 2017 she was given a grant of 300,000 rupees on 1 July just before the 2017 Asian Athletics Championships by Orissa Chief minister Naveen Patnaik. Her colleague Swapna Barman collapsed during the final event of the 2017 Asian Athletics Championships – Women's heptathlon which was the 800 metres. However Barman still took the gold. Meg Hemphill of Japan took the silver and Hembram took the bronze medal. Later that month Hembram took the 100m gold medal at the 57th National Senior Inter-State Athletic Championships in Guntur.

Hembram won a gold medal at the 5th Asian Indoor and Martial Arts Games in Ashgabat, Turkmenistan on 17 September 2017.
