= Swapna Barman =

Indian heptathlete and politician

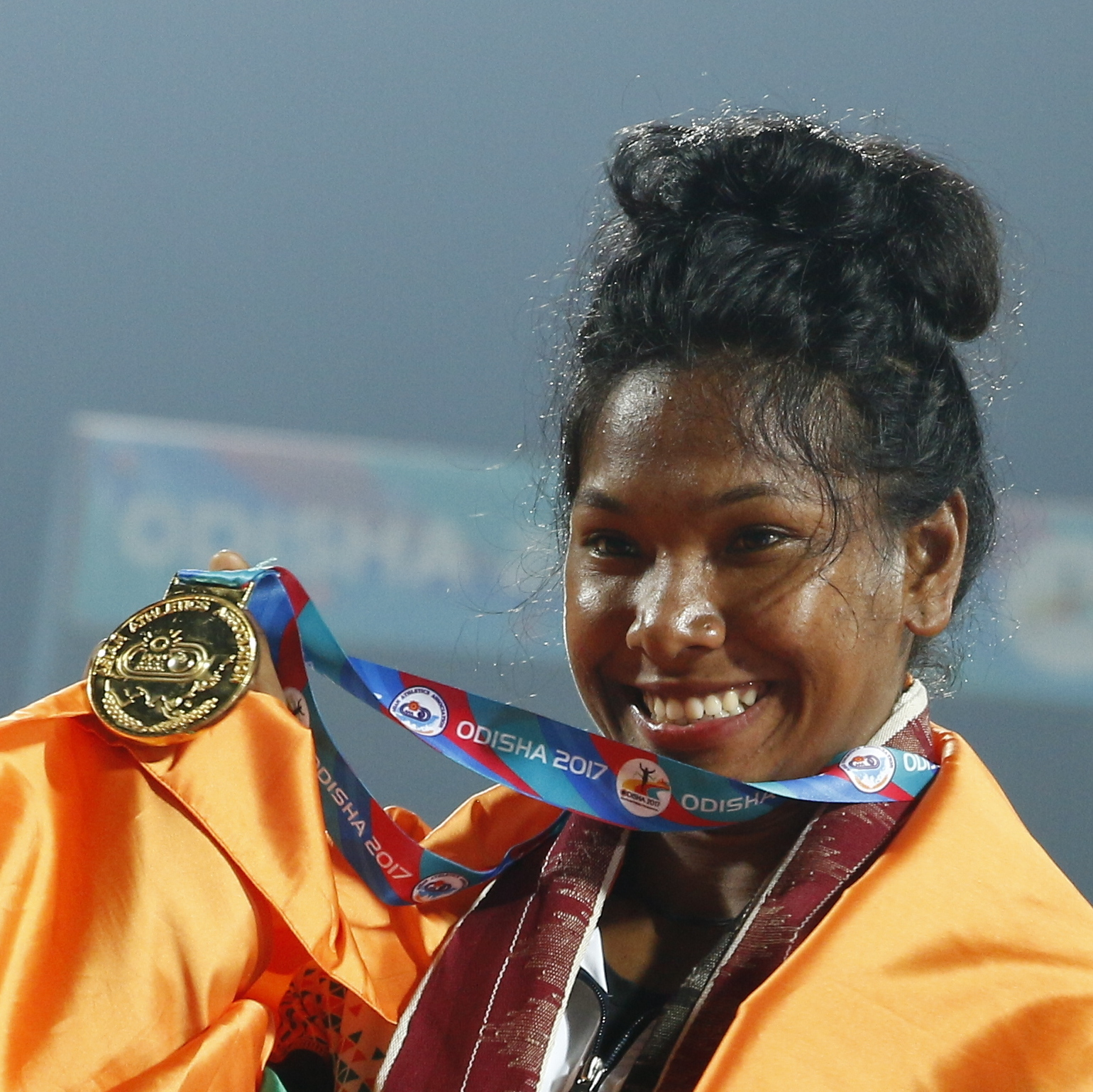

Personal information
- Born: 29 October 1996 (age 29) Ghosh Para, Jalpaiguri, West Bengal, India

Sport
- Country: India
- Sport: Athletics
- Event: Heptathlon

Achievements and titles
- Personal bests: 6026 points (Jakarta 2018)
Medal record
Women's athletics
Representing India
Asian Games
Gold medal – first place	2018 Jakarta	Heptathlon
Asian Championships
Gold medal – first place	2017 Bhubaneswar	Heptathlon
Silver medal – second place	2019 Doha	Heptathlon
Silver medal – second place	2023 Bangkok	Heptathlon
Asian Indoor Championships
Silver medal – second place	2023 Astana	Pentathlon
- Updated on 27 April 2019

Swapna Barman (born 29 October 1996) is an Indian heptathlete and politician. She won the gold medal at 2018 Asian Games and placed first in the Heptathlon at the 2017 Asian Athletics Championships. In August 2019, she was honoured with the Arjuna Award. In 2022, she took gold medals in the high jump and the heptathlon at the National Games of India.

== Career ==
Barman was born in Ghospara village near Jalpaiguri, West Bengal in 1996 in a poor Rajbongshi family. She is unusual in having six toes on each foot. Her mother Basana worked on a tea estate and her father, Panchanan Barman, was a rickshaw driver and is bed-ridden after having suffered a stroke in 2013, making life tricky for his four children. She found it difficult to find the right food and her unusual feet caused her pain because she could not afford extra wide running shoes. Swapna uses her prize money to look after her family who live in a house without a concrete wall. In 2016, she won a scholarship of ₹150,000 in recognition of the success she had at athletics. She trains at the Sports Authority of India campus at Kolkata.

In 2016, she was supported by the GoSports Foundation through the Rahul Dravid Athlete Mentorship Programme.

Barman won the gold at 2018 Asian Games, she accomplished this despite a jaw injury. Barman collapsed during the final event of the 2017 Asian Athletics Championships – Women's heptathlon which was the 800 metres where she was fourth. However Barman had broken many of her personal records and she had gained enough points from the previous six events to take gold.

In 2020, she lost out on funding but said that she would continue to train at her home in Jalpaiguri, West Bengal.

She took gold in the heptathlon at the 2021 Federation Cup Senior Athletics Championships and in 2022 she competed at the National Games in the heptathlon. She gained an unexpected gold when she broke the high jump games record with a height of 1.83m. She was also in first place in the javelin and the 100m hurdles. She won the gold for the heptathlon and hinted that she would have scored even higher if she had a sponsor for some support staff.

== Achievements ==
=== Asian Athletics Championships ===
Year	Venue	Event	Points	Result
2017	Kalinga Stadium, Bhubaneswar	Heptathlon	5942	Gold
2019	Khalifa International Stadium, Doha	Heptathlon	5993	Silver

=== Federation Cup ===
Year	Venue	Event	Points	Result
2017	JLN Stadium, New Delhi	Heptathlon	5897	Gold

=== Asian Games ===
Year	Venue	Event	Points	Result
2014	Incheon Asiad Main Stadium	Heptathlon	5178	5th place
2018	Gelora Bung Karno Stadium	Heptathlon	6026	Gold
2022	Hangzhou Olympic Sports Expo Center Stadium	Heptathlon	5708	4th place

==== Rewards for winning the gold medal at the 2018 Asian Games ====
- ₹10 lakh (US$10,000) from the Government of West Bengal.

== Political career ==
On 27 February 2026, Barman joined the Trinamool Congress. In March 2026, she received the party ticket to contest from the Rajganj constituency in the 2026 West Bengal Assembly elections, but lost to Bharatiya Janata Party candidate Dinesh Sarkar.
