= Wang Qingling =

Chinese track and field athlete (born 1993)

Medal record

Women's athletics

Representing China

Asian Indoor Athletics Championships
Gold medal – first place	2014 Hangzhou	Pentathlon

Wang Qingling (simplified Chinese: 王庆铃; traditional Chinese: 王慶鈴; born 14 January 1993) is a Chinese track and field athlete who competes in the heptathlon and pentathlon. She holds personal bests of 5785 and 4246 points for the events, respectively. She was the gold medallist at the Asian Indoor Athletics Championships in 2014 and won both the Chinese Championships and National Games of China in 2013.

== Career ==
Born in Fujian, Wang began competing in combined track and field events as a teenager. She made her first impact at a national level in 2011, when she took second place at the Chinese Athletics Championships with a score of 5632 points and also placed second in the Chinese City Games, representing Xiamen. The following year she won the Chinese junior title in a personal best of 5668 points. Wang placed seventh at the 2012 World Junior Championships in Athletics, won at the Chinese Athletics Grand Prix final, then placed third at the national championships.

Competing nationally, she spent the 2013 season almost undefeated: after a runner-up finish on the Chinese Grand Prix circuit she had consecutive wins at the Chinese Championships, the National Grand Prix Final, and then the 12th National Games of China (setting a personal best of 5785 points at the latter competition). This performance ranked her the second best Asian heptathlete that year, behind Thailand's Wassana Winatho.

Wang won the pentathlon title at the 2014 Asian Indoor Athletics Championships in February, accumulating a personal best of 4246 points.
