= Ana Camila Pirelli =

Paraguayan heptathlete

Personal information
- Full name: Ana Camila Donatella Pirelli Cubas
- Born: January 30, 1989 (age 37) Ayolas, Paraguay
- Height: 1.75 m (5 ft 9 in)
- Weight: 70 kg (154 lb)

Sport
- Country: Paraguay
- Sport: Athletics
- Event: Combined events
Medal record
Women's Athletics
Representing Paraguay
South American Games
Gold medal – first place	2014 Santiago	Heptathlon
Silver medal – second place	2022 Asunción	Heptathlon
Bronze medal – third place	2018 Cochabamba	Heptathlon
Ibero-American Championships
Gold medal – first place	2018 Trujillo	Heptathlon
Silver medal – second place	2022 La Nucía	Heptathlon
Bronze medal – third place	2016 Rio de Janeiro	Heptathlon
Bolivarian Games
Gold medal – first place	2013 Trujillo	Heptathlon
South American Championships
Silver medal – second place	2013 Cartagena	Heptathlon
- Updated on 24 July 2014

Ana Camila Donatella Pirelli Cubas (born 30 January 1989), nicknamed “Guarani Panther”, is a Paraguayan track and field athlete who competes in the heptathlon. She is the Paraguayan record holder in the event with a personal best score of 5733 points. Pirelli holds more than a dozen national records in events as varied as the 100 metres hurdles, shot put and the indoor women's pentathlon. Pirelli was the heptathlon silver medallist at the 2013 South American Championships in Athletics. She won the gold medal at the 2013 Bolivarian Games and the 2014 South American Games, breaking games records at both competitions. Pirelli is tied to Paraguay Marathon Club and competes in Paraguay's national competitions under the Federación Paraguaya de Atletismo.

Pirelli has committed to using her platform as a sportswoman to speak out about the impact of climate change as an EcoAthlete Champion, saying that growing up surrounded by wildlife has made her eager to protect it. In November 2023, she was named one of the BBC 100 Women 2023 for her sporting achievements and climate activism.

== Career ==
=== Early life and career ===
She was born to Juan Carlos Pirelli and Magdalena Cubas in Asunción and raised in Ayolas. Pirelli had an upbringing full of sports – her father was a basketball player while her mother was a former national universities champion in the pentathlon. She frequented the local sports club, Club Social y Deportivo Yacyretá, with her brother in her youth. She took part in basketball, handball and tennis. At age ten she became the national champion in figure skating in her age category. She then turned her attention to swimming and represented her country at an international event in Chile in 2005, setting a national junior record in the 50 metres freestyle swimming event. An interest in athletics followed: she took part in the 2005 South American Junior Championships in Athletics, although she was last in both the throwing events (shot put and javelin throw) in which she competed. In 2006, she ran a Paraguayan national record of 25.51 seconds for the 200 metres and won the gold medal in the heptathlon at the 2006 South American Youth Championships in Athletics.

Pirelli participated in the 100 metres hurdles and the 4×400 metres relay at the 2007 South American Junior Championships in Athletics, but finished last in both races. The heptathlon continued to bring her greater success, as she managed fourth place at the 2007 Pan American Junior Athletics Championships – an event won by future world championships medalist Brianne Theisen.

=== First senior competitions ===
Pirelli entered her first senior international event the year after, recording a personal best score of 4940 points to take 12th place at the 2008 Pan American Combined Events Championships. She began to study sports science at university in Asunción and gained a scholarship to continue her studies at Oral Roberts University in Oklahoma, United States. Her most prominent outing in 2009 was at the South American Championships, where she ranked fifth in the heptathlon.

A national record in the heptathlon came at the 2010 South American Games/South American U23 Championships, where she was the bronze medallist with a score of 5118 points. She performed at two major events in 2011: a score of 5115 points brought her fourth at the 2011 South American Championships in Athletics and a new national record of 5157 points placed her ninth at the 2011 Pan American Games. She set school records when competing for the Oral Roberts Golden Eagles in collegiate competition in 2012: a score of 3765 for the indoor pentathlon preceded a win at The Summit League championship outdoors in a record score of 5254 points in the heptathlon. In addition to this, she set a javelin throw record of 48.75 m (159 ft 11 1/4 in) at the NCAA preliminaries. She improved her national record further in international competition that year as she managed 5479 points for fifth place at the 2012 Ibero-American Championships – her mark of 13.91 m (45 ft 7 1/2 in) in the shot put was also an outright national record.

Pirelli graduated from Oral Roberts University with a degree in biology in 2012 and was the highest academic performer among the school's student athletes that year.

=== Multiple record holder ===
The 2013 season saw Pirelli establish herself among the best ever female athletes from Paraguay. Over the course of the year, she broke the national records in the 200 m (24.64 seconds), 400 metres (56.94 seconds), indoor 800 metres (2:20.44 minutes), 60 metres hurdles (8.79 seconds), 100 metres hurdles (13.70 seconds), indoor long jump (5.67 m), the indoor pentathlon (4032 points) and the heptathlon (5733 points). At the start of the year her pentathlon performance topped the rankings at the Austrian indoor championships and her score ranked ahead of the former South American record held by Themys Zambrzycki, which had been broken by Vanessa Chefer Spínola earlier that month. She gave four heptathlon performances outdoors that year. She set a new best of 5617 points at the Brazilian combined events cup in April, then improved to 5683 points to take second place at the 2013 Pan American Combined Events Cup behind Cuba's Yorgelis Rodríguez. She was runner-up to Brazil's Tamara de Sousa at the 2013 South American Championships in Athletics – being one of two medallists for Paraguay alongside Víctor Fatecha. Her best performance of the year came at the 2013 Bolivarian Games, where she set a Games record and national record of 5733 points to secure the gold medal.

In her first heptathlon of 2014 she again won a regional gold medal, this time at the 2014 South American Games. Her result of 5669 points was a Games record and she became the first ever Paraguayan woman to win an athletics title at the competition. This included a national record of 13.66 seconds for the 100 m hurdles.

== Personal bests ==
Outdoor

- 200 metres – 24.39 sec (wind: -0.1 m/s) – (Colombia) Medellín, 23 April 2016 NR
- 800 metres – 2:13.65 min – (Brazil) Rio de Janeiro, 16 May 2016
- 100 metres hurdles – 13.40 sec (wind: +1.7 m/s) – (Colombia) Medellín, 23 April 2016 NR
- High jump – 1.68 m – (Canada) Ottawa, 1 June 2013 NR
- Long jump – 5.69 m (wind: -0.8 m/s) – (Colombia) Cartagena, 6 July 2013
- Shot put – 14.36 m – (Chile) Santiago, 3 April 2013 NR
- Javelin throw – 48.75 m – (United States) Austin, 24 May 2012
- Heptathlon – 5879 pts – (Colombia) Medellín, 23–24 April 2016 NR

Indoor

- 800 metres – 2:20.44 min – (Austria) Linz, 17 February 2013 NR
- 60 metres hurdles – 8.79 sec – (Austria) Linz, 17 February 2013 NR
- High jump – 1.63 m – (Austria) Linz, 17 February 2013 NR
- Long jump – 5.67 m – (Austria) Linz, 17 February 2013 NR
- Shot put – 13.70 m – (United States) Lawrence, 27 January 2012 NR
- Pentathlon – 4032 pts – (Austria) Linz, 17 February 2013 NR

Non-combined events

- 200 metres indoor – 27.09 sec – (United States) Joplin, 6 February 2009 NR
- 400 metres outdoor – 56.70 sec – (Paraguay) Asunción, 29 April 2017 NR

All personal best information from Tilastopaja and IAAF

== Achievements ==
Year	Competition	Venue	Position	Event	Notes
Representing the Paraguay
2005	South American Junior Championships	Rosario, Argentina	9th	Shot put	10.54 m
2005	South American Junior Championships	Rosario, Argentina	8th	Javelin	32.12 m
2006	South American U23 Championships / South American Games	Buenos Aires, Argentina	4th	Heptathlon	4593 pts
2006	South American Youth Championships	Caracas, Venezuela	1st	Heptathlon	4790 pts
2007	South American Junior Championships	São Paulo, Brazil	8th	100 m H	15.57 s (0.0 m/s)
2007	South American Junior Championships	São Paulo, Brazil	7th	4×100 m	49.55 s
2007	South American Junior Championships	São Paulo, Brazil	2nd	Heptathlon	4873 pts
2007	Pan American Junior Championships	São Paulo, Brazil	4th	Heptathlon	4873 pts
2008	Pan American Combined Events Championships	Santo Domingo, Dominican Republic	12th	Heptathlon	4940 pts
2009	South American Championships	Lima, Peru	5th	Heptathlon	4754 pts
2010	South American Under-23 Championships	Medellín, Colombia	3rd	Heptathlon	5118 pts
2011	South American Championships	Buenos Aires, Argentina	4th	Heptathlon	5115 pts
2011	Pan American Games	Guadalajara, Mexico	9th	Heptathlon	5157 pts A
2012	Ibero-American Championships	Barquisimeto, Venezuela	5th	Heptathlon	5479 pts
2013	Pan American Combined Events Cup	Ottawa, Canada	2nd	Heptathlon	5683 pts
2013	South American Championships	Cartagena, Colombia	2nd	Heptathlon	5610 pts
2013	Bolivarian Games	Trujillo, Peru	6th	100 m H	14.15 s (+0.1 m/s)
2013	Bolivarian Games	Trujillo, Peru	1st	Heptathlon	5733 pts
2014	South American Games	Santiago, Chile	1st	Heptathlon	5669 pts
2014	Pan American Combined Events Cup	Ottawa, Canada	7th	Heptathlon	5548 pts
2014	Ibero-American Championships	São Paulo, Brazil	–	Heptathlon	DNF
2015	South American Championships	Lima, Peru	5th	Heptathlon	5363 pts
2015	Pan American Games	Toronto, Canada	9th	Heptathlon	5663 pts
2015	World Championships	Beijing, China	35th (h)	100 m H	14.09 s
2016	Ibero-American Championships	Rio de Janeiro, Brazil	3rd	Heptathlon	5748 pts
2017	South American Championships	Asunción, Paraguay	5th	Shot put	13.89 m
2018	South American Games	Cochabamba, Bolivia	3rd	Heptathlon	5503 pts
2018	Ibero-American Championships	Trujillo, Peru	1st	Heptathlon	5879 pts
2019	South American Championships	Lima, Peru	4th	Heptathlon	5694 pts
2019	Pan American Games	Lima, Peru	4th	Heptathlon	5907 pts
2021	Olympic Games	Tokyo, Japan	38th (h)	100 m H	13.98 s
2022	Ibero-American Championships	La Nucía, Spain	2nd	Heptathlon	5808 pts
2022	Bolivarian Games	Valledupar, Colombia	4th	100 m H	13.75 s
2022	Bolivarian Games	Valledupar, Colombia	2nd	Heptathlon	5848 pts
2022	South American Games	Asunción, Paraguay	2nd	Heptathlon	5756 pts
2023	South American Championships	São Paulo, Brazil	–	Heptathlon	DNF
2024	South American Indoor Championships	Cochabamba, Bolivia	3rd	Pentathlon	3410 pts
2024	Ibero-American Championships	Cuiabá, Brazil	4th	Heptathlon	5402 pts

== Awards ==
In November 2023, Pirellli was named to the BBC's 100 Women list.
