= Athletics at the 2011 Pan American Games – Women's heptathlon =

Women's heptathlon at the 2011 Pan American Games
- Venue: Telmex Athletics Stadium
- Dates: October 25–26

Medalists
Gold medal	Lucimara da Silva	Brazil
Silver medal	Yasmiany Pedroso	Cuba
Bronze medal	Francia Manzanillo	Dominican Republic

The women's heptathlon event of the athletics events at the 2011 Pan American Games was held the 25 and 26 of October at the Telmex Athletics Stadium. The defending Pan American Games champion is Jessica Zelinka of the Canada.

== Records ==
Prior to this competition, the existing world and Pan American Games records were as follows:

World record	Jackie Joyner-Kersee (USA)	7291	Seoul, South Korea	September 24, 1988
Pan American Games record	Magalys García (CUB)	6290	Winnipeg, Canada	July 28, 1999

== Qualification ==
Each National Olympic Committee (NOC) was able to enter up to two entrants providing they had met the minimum standard (4850) in the qualifying period (January 1, 2010 to September 14, 2011).

== Schedule ==
Date	Time	Round
October 25, 2011	13:20	100 metres hurdles
October 25, 2011	14:00	High jump
October 25, 2011	16:40	Shot put
October 25, 2011	18:00	200 metres
October 26, 2011	15:30	Long jump
October 26, 2011	17:10	Javelin throw
October 26, 2011	18:20	800 metres
October 26, 2011	18:20	Final standings

== Results ==
All distances shown are in meters:centimeters

KEY:	q	Fastest non-qualifiers	Q	Qualified	AR	Area record	NR	National record	PB	Personal best	SB	Seasonal best

=== 100 m hurdles ===
Rank	Heat	Athlete	Nationality	Result	Points	Notes
1	2	Lucimara da Silva	Brazil	13.50	1050	PB
2	2	Agustina Zerboni	Argentina	13.66	1027	PB
3	2	Gretchen Quintana	Cuba	13.98	981	
4	2	Francia Manzanillo	Dominican Republic	14.12	961	PB
5	2	Yasmiany Pedroso	Cuba	14.13	960	PB
6	2	Chrystal Ruiz	Mexico	14.20	950	PB
7	1	Karla Schleske	Mexico	14.25	943	PB
8	1	Thaimara Rivas	Venezuela	14.25	943	PB
9	1	Gullercy Gonzalez	Venezuela	14.30	936	PB
10	1	Shianne Smith	Bermuda	14.50	909	PB
11	1	Bridgette Ingram	United States	14.75	875	
12	1	Ana Pirelli	Paraguay	14.87	859	PB
13	2	Wanetta Kirby	Virgin Islands	17.99	489	

=== High jump ===
Rank	Athlete	Nationality	Result	Points	Notes	Overall
1	Lucimara da Silva	Brazil	1.80	978		2028
2	Yasmiany Pedroso	Cuba	1.74	903		1863
3	Gullercy Gonzalez	Venezuela	1.74	903		1839
4	Karla Schleske	Mexico	1.74	903		1846
5	Chrystal Ruiz	Mexico	1.68	830	PB	1780
6	Wanetta Kirby	Virgin Islands	1.68	830		1319
7	Gretchen Quintana	Cuba	1.65	795		1776
8	Bridgette Ingram	United States	1.65	795		1670
9	Francia Manzanillo	Dominican Republic	1.59	724		1685
9	Agustina Zerboni	Argentina	1.59	724	PB	1751
11	Thaimara Rivas	Venezuela	1.59	724	PB	1667
12	Ana Pirelli	Paraguay	1.56	689		1548
13	Shianne Smith	Bermuda	1.50	621		1530

=== Shot put ===
Rank	Athlete	Nationality	Result	Points	Notes	Overall
1	Yasmiany Pedroso	Cuba	14.63	836	PB	2699
2	Ana Pirelli	Paraguay	13.00	727	PB	2275
3	Lucimara da Silva	Brazil	12.93	723	PB	2751
4	Francia Manzanillo	Dominican Republic	12.89	720	PB	2405
5	Gretchen Quintana	Cuba	12.88	719		2495
6	Agustina Zerboni	Argentina	12.74	710	PB	2461
7	Thaimara Rivas	Venezuela	12.11	668		2335
8	Bridgette Ingram	United States	11.95	658		2328
9	Karla Schleske	Mexico	11.74	644	PB	2490
10	Gullercy Gonzalez	Venezuela	10.95	592	PB	2431
11	Shianne Smith	Bermuda	10.47	560		2090
12	Chrystal Ruiz	Mexico	9.87	521	PB	2301
13	Wanetta Kirby	Virgin Islands	8.45	428		1747

=== 200 metres ===
Rank	Heat	Athlete	Nationality	Result	Points	Notes	Overall
1	2	Gretchen Quintana	Cuba	24.45	938		3433
2	2	Lucimara da Silva	Brazil	24.76	909	PB	3660
3	2	Chrystal Ruiz	Mexico	24.83	902	PB	3203
4	2	Agustina Zerboni	Argentina	24.84	902	PB	3363
5	2	Francia Manzanillo	Dominican Republic	24.87	899		3304
6	2	Wanetta Kirby	Virgin Islands	24.98	889		2636
7	2	Shianne Smith	Bermuda	25.04	883		2973
8	1	Gullercy Gonzalez	Venezuela	25.47	844	PB	3275
9	1	Yasmiany Pedroso	Cuba	25.48	843	PB	3542
10	1	Ana Pirelli	Paraguay	25.85	810	PB	3085
11	1	Karla Schleske	Mexico	26.20	780	PB	3270
11	1	Thaimara Rivas	Venezuela	26.48	756	PB	3091
13	1	Bridgette Ingram	United States	27.18	697		3025

=== Long jump ===
Rank	Athlete	Nationality	Result	Points	Notes	Overall
1	Lucimara da Silva	Brazil	6.36	962		4622
2	Yasmiany Pedroso	Cuba	5.87	810		4352
3	Gretchen Quintana	Cuba	5.75	774		4207
4	Chrystal Ruiz	Mexico	5.68	753	PB	3956
5	Wanetta Kirby	Virgin Islands	5.65	744		3380
6	Shianne Smith	Bermuda	5.63	738	PB	3711
7	Agustina Zerboni	Argentina	5.44	683		4046
8	Thaimara Rivas	Venezuela	5.44	683		3774
9	Gullercy Gonzalez	Venezuela	5.41	674		3949
10	Francia Manzanillo	Dominican Republic	5.40	671		3975
11	Bridgette Ingram	United States	5.38	665		3690
12	Ana Pirelli	Paraguay	5.18	609		3694
13	Karla Schleske	Mexico	5.17	606		3876

=== Javelin throw ===
Rank	Athlete	Nationality	Result	Points	Notes	Overall
1	Francia Manzanillo	Dominican Republic	46.73	797	PB	4772
2	Yasmiany Pedroso	Cuba	44.23	749	PB	5101
3	Lucimara da Silva	Brazil	42.03	706	PB	5328
4	Ana Pirelli	Paraguay	41.50	696	PB	4390
5	Agustina Zerboni	Argentina	39.79	663	PB	4709
6	Thaimara Rivas	Venezuela	36.83	607		4381
7	Karla Schleske	Mexico	36.40	598		4474
8	Gullercy Gonzalez	Venezuela	35.34	578		4527
9	Gretchen Quintana	Cuba	35.21	576		4783
10	Shianne Smith	Bermuda	31.95	514		4225
11	Chrystal Ruiz	Mexico	31.88	512	PB	4468
12	Bridgette Ingram	United States	31.52	505		4195
13	Wanetta Kirby	Virgin Islands	20.78	303		3683

=== 800 metres ===
Rank	Athlete	Nationality	Result	Points	Notes	Overall
1	Shianne Smith	Bermuda	2:15.37	888	PB	5113
2	Chrystal Ruiz	Mexico	2:16.02	878	PB	5346
3	Francia Manzanillo	Dominican Republic	2:16.46	872	PB	5644
4	Lucimara da Silva	Brazil	2:21.39	805		6133
5	Ana Pirelli	Paraguay	2:24.24	767		5157
6	Agustina Zerboni	Argentina	2:24.51	763		5472
7	Gretchen Quintana	Cuba	2:24.71	761		5544
8	Gullercy Gonzalez	Venezuela	2:27.52	724		5251
9	Karla Schleske	Mexico	2:28.66	710		5184
10	Bridgette Ingram	United States	2:36.47	614		4809
11	Yasmiany Pedroso	Cuba	2:36.88	609		5710
12	Wanetta Kirby	Virgin Islands	2:50.38	460		4143
	Thaimara Rivas	Venezuela	DNS			

=== Final standings ===
Rank	Athlete	Nationality	Points	Notes
1st place, gold medalist(s)	Lucimara da Silva	Brazil	6133	AR
2nd place, silver medalist(s)	Yasmiany Pedroso	Cuba	5710	
3rd place, bronze medalist(s)	Francia Manzanillo	Dominican Republic	5644	PB
4	Gretchen Quintana	Cuba	5544	
5	Agustina Zerboni	Argentina	5472	PB
6	Chrystal Ruiz	Mexico	5346	
7	Gullercy Gonzalez	Venezuela	5251	
8	Karla Schleske	Mexico	5184	
9	Ana Pirelli	Paraguay	5157	PB
10	Shianne Smith	Bermuda	5113	
11	Bridgette Ingram	United States	4809	
12	Wanetta Kirby	Virgin Islands	4143	
	Thaimara Rivas	Venezuela	DNF	
