= 2012 Pan American Combined Events Cup =

- Organisers: APA
- Edition: 7th
- Date: May 26–27
- Host city: Ottawa, Ontario, Canada
- Venue: Terry Fox Stadium

The 2012 Pan American Combined Events Cup was held in Ottawa, Ontario, Canada, at the Terry Fox Stadium on May 26–27, 2012. The event was held jointly with the Athletics Ontario Senior Combined Events Championships. A detailed report on the event and an appraisal of the results was given.

Complete results were published.

== Medallists ==
Event	Gold		Silver		Bronze	
Men's Decathlon	José Ángel Mendieta; Cuba	7792	Eric Broadbent; United States	7498	Roman Garibay; Mexico	7149
Women's Heptathlon	Yorgelis Rodríguez; Cuba	5819	Jennifer Cotten; Canada	5656	Yasmiany Pedroso; Cuba	5650

== Results ==
=== Men's Decathlon ===
Key

The highest mark recorded in each event is highlighted in yellow

Rank	Athlete	Overall points	100 m	LJ	SP	HJ	400 m	110 m H	DT	PV	JT	1500 m
1st place, gold medalist(s)	José Ángel Mendieta; Cuba	7792	883; 10.90 s w:+2.4	896; 7.34 m w:+0.5	762; 14.55 m	767; 1.96 m	855; 49.14 s	876; 14.78 s w:+1.4	682; 40.86 m	673; 4.20 m	743; 60.32 m	655; 4:44.01 min
2nd place, silver medalist(s)	Eric Broadbent; United States	7498	915; 10.76 s w:+2.4	910; 7.40 m w:+0.5	693; 13.42 m	906; 2.11 m	898; 48.23 s	889; 14.68 s w:+1.4	516; 32.59 m	645; 4.10 m	507; 44.48 m	619; 4:49.87 min
3rd place, bronze medalist(s)	Roman Garibay; Mexico	7149	814; 11.21 s w:+1.5	684; 6.44 m w:+0.9	670; 13.05 m	661; 1.84 m	809; 50.12 s	797; 15.44 s w:+1.4	659; 39.73 m	590; 3.90 m	812; 64.90 m	653; 4:44.43 min
4	Mark Chenery; Canada	7123	836; 11.11 s w:+1.5	857; 7.18 m w:+1.0	613; 12.11 m	714; 1.90 m	819; 49.91 s	840; 15.08 s w:+1.4	638; 38.67 m	590; 3.90 m	569; 48.68 m	647; 4:45.28 min
5	Pat Arbour; Canada	7002	730; 11.61 s w:+1.5	713; 6.57 m w:+2.1	776; 14.78 m	636; 1.81 m	661; 53.49 s	797; 15.44 s w:+1.4	797; 46.47 m	645; 4.10 m	703; 57.66 m	544; 5:02.70 min
—	Craig Thomas (Canada) /Alberta	6769	721; 11.65 s w:+0.1	734; 6.66 m w:+2.9	636; 12.49 m	740; 1.93 m	685; 52.91 s	814; 15.30 s w:+1.3	533; 33.46 m	688; 4.25 m	516; 45.08 m	702; 4:36.64 min
6	Jorge Eduard Rivera; Mexico	6760	763; 11.45 s w:+1.5	725; 6.62 m w:-0.6	627; 12.34 m	794; 1.99 m	753; 51.36 s	715; 16.16 s w:+1.4	637; 38.65 m	673; 4.20 m	495; 43.64 m	578; 4:56.78 min
—	Reid Gustavson (Canada) /Ontario	6693	744; 11.54 s w:+0.1	746; 6.71 m w:+1.5	670; 13.05 m	661; 1.84 m	754; 51.34 s	667; 16.60 s w:+1.3	558; 34.70 m	576; 3.85 m	639; 53.42 m	678; 4:40.31 min
—	Keegan Sharp (Canada) /Saskatchewan	6679	725; 11.63 s w:+0.1	709; 6.55 m w:+0.1	618; 12.19 m	661; 1.84 m	786; 50.63 s	802; 15.40 s w:+1.3	530; 33.30 m	603; 3.95 m	523; 45.56 m	722; 4:33.44 min
DNF	Matthew Johnson; United States	6316	917; 10.75 s w:+2.4	900; 7.36 m w:+2.9	634; 12.46 m	661; 1.84 m	838; 49.50 s	912; 14.49 s w:+1.4	738; 43.60 m	0 NM	716; 58.53 m	0 DNS
DNF	Jake Arnold; United States	6209	856; 11.02 s w:+2.4	700; 6.51 m w:+2.6	744; 14.25 m	714; 1.90 m	829; 49.68 s	931; 14.34 s w:+1.4	769; 45.11 m	0 NM	666; 55.21 m	0 DNS
—	Chris Robertson (Canada) /Ontario	5661	691; 11.80 s w:+0.1	702; 6.52 m w:+1.0	527; 10.69 m	740; 1.93 m	706; 52.42 s	0 DQ	617; 37.65 m	549; 3.75 m	505; 44.30 m	624; 4:49.17 min
DNF	Christopher Crossley; Canada	2670	817; 11.20 s w:+1.5	600; 6.06 m w:+1.8	668; 13.01 m	585; 1.75 m	0 DNS	DNS				
DNF	Jamie Adjetey-Nelson; Canada	2496	906; 10.80 s w:+2.4	823; 7.04 m w:+0.7	767; 14.63 m	0 DNS	DNS					

=== Women's Heptathlon ===
Key

The highest mark recorded in each event is highlighted in yellow

Rank	Athlete	Overall points	100 m H	HJ	SP	200 m	LJ	JT	800 m
—	Uhunoma Osazuwa; Nigeria	6049	1083; 13.28 s w:+1.4	991; 1.81 m	735; 13.12 m	995; 23.85 s w:-1.3	899; 6.16 m w:+0.9	550; 33.87 m	796; 2:22.07 min
1st place, gold medalist(s)	Yorgelis Rodríguez; Cuba	5819	1003; 13.83 s w:+0.9	953; 1.78 m	684; 12.35 m	888; 24.99 s w:-1.3	801; 5.84 m w:+0.4	671; 40.20 m	819; 2:20.36 min
2nd place, silver medalist(s)	Jennifer Cotten; Canada	5656	1031; 13.63 s w:+1.4	806; 1.66 m	585; 10.85 m	904; 24.81 s w:+0.6	902; 6.17 m w:-0.4	478; 30.09 m	950; 2:11.02 min
3rd place, bronze medalist(s)	Yasmiany Pedroso; Cuba	5650	932; 14.33 s w:+0.9	879; 1.72 m	819; 14.37 m	784; 26.15 s w:+0.6	804; 5.85 m w:+7.4	696; 41.50 m	736; 2:26.57 min
4	Yilian Durruthy; Cuba	5602	1020; 13.71 s w:+1.4	916; 1.75 m	725; 12.96 m	946; 24.36 s w:-1.3	859; 6.03 m w:+0.5	437; 27.93 m	699; 2:29.51 min
5	Francia Manzanillo; Dominican Republic	5531	980; 13.99 s w:+0.9	666; 1.54 m	723; 12.94 m	930; 24.53 s w:+0.6	598; 5.14 m w:0.0	742; 43.87 m	892; 2:15.07 min
6	Emily Pearson; United States	5487	980; 13.99 s w:+1.4	806; 1.66 m	627; 11.48 m	928; 24.56 s w:+0.6	631; 5.26 m w:+1.3	728; 43.14 m	787; 2:22.73 min
7	Kasey Hill; United States	5478	952; 14.19 s w:+1.4	701; 1.57 m	707; 12.69 m	918; 24.66 s w:-1.3	780; 5.77 m w:-1.1	584; 35.67 m	836; 2:19.08 min
—	Rachael McIntosh (Canada) /Nova Scotia	5376	870; 14.79 s w:-1.1	783; 1.64 m	627; 11.49 m	861; 25.28 s w:+2.4	729; 5.60 m w:-1.1	643; 38.74 m	863; 2:17.09 min
8	Susan Coltman; Canada	5265	941; 14.27 s w:+0.9	771; 1.63 m	716; 12.83 m	840; 25.52 s w:+0.6	756; 5.69 m w:-0.2	552; 33.99 m	689; 2:30.31 min
9	Peaches Roach; Jamaica	5149	971; 14.05 s w:+0.9	953; 1.78 m	589; 10.90 m	907; 24.78 s w:-1.3	606; 5.17 m w:+0.4	431; 27.61 m	692; 2:30.04 min
—	Tiffeny Parker; United States	5103	943; 14.25 s w:-1.1	747; 1.61 m	664; 12.05 m	802; 25.94 s w:+2.4	712; 5.54 m w:+0.6	535; 33.09 m	700; 2:29.44 min
10	Natasha Miller; Canada	5092	956; 14.16 s w:+1.4	879; 1.72 m	498; 9.52 m	857; 25.33 s w:+0.6	671; 5.40 m w:-1.6	440; 28.07 m	791; 2:22.40 min
—	Pascale Délisle (Canada) /Quebec	4831	917; 14.44 s w:-1.1	712; 1.58 m	559; 10.45 m	891; 24.95 s w:+2.4	660; 5.36 m w:-0.3	357; 23.65 m	735; 2:26.69 min
—	Rachel Jewett (Canada) /Ontario	4816	866; 14.82 s w:-1.1	818; 1.67 m	510; 9.71 m	833; 25.60 s w:+2.4	530; 4.89 m w:+0.1	345; 23.01 m	914; 2:13.47 min
11	Mariana Abuela; Mexico	4780	932; 14.33 s w:+2.0	632; 1.51 m	527; 9.97 m	747; 26.58 s w:-0.3	576; 5.06 m w:+0.7	575; 35.17 m	791; 2:22.40 min
—	Michele Krech (Canada) /Ontario	4731	796; 15.35 s w:-1.1	712; 1.58 m	599; 11.06 m	737; 26.70 s w:+2.4	546; 4.95 m w:-0.2	470; 29.66 m	871; 2:16.56 min
12	Ana María Porras; Costa Rica	4729	901; 14.56 s w:+2.0	771; 1.63 m	543; 10.21 m	764; 26.38 s w:-0.3	677; 5.42 m w:-0.5	384; 25.10 m	689; 2:30.33 min
13	Shianne Smith; Bermuda	4648	810; 15.24 s w:+0.9	632; 1.51 m	560; 10.47 m	839; 25.53 s w:+0.6	634; 5.27 m w:+0.5	473; 29.81 m	700; 2:29.45 min
14	Karla Scheleske; Mexico	4573	788; 15.41 s w:+2.0	771; 1.63 m	614; 11.28 m	649; 27.77 s w:-0.3	530; 4.89 m w:+1.3	606; 36.80 m	615; 2:36.41 min
—	Juliana Bergin (Canada) /Ontario	4476	758; 15.65 s w:+0.2	678; 1.55 m	644; 11.74 m	716; 26.95 s w:+2.2	570; 5.04 m w:+0.3	425; 27.27 m	685; 2:30.62 min
15	Katy Louise Sealy; Belize	4300	729; 15.88 s w:+2.0	771; 1.63 m	529; 9.99 m	615; 28.20 s w:-0.3	532; 4.90 m w:+0.9	519; 32.26 m	605; 2:37.24 min
16	Melissa Arana; Peru	4298	694; 16.17 s w:+2.0	632; 1.51 m	486; 9.34 m	701; 27.13 s w:-0.3	623; 5.23 m w:-1.2	476; 29.99 m	686; 2:30.51 min
—	Johanna Dobransky (Canada) /Ontario	4036	712; 16.02 s w:+0.2	747; 1.61 m	474; 9.15 m	590; 28.52 s w:+2.2	492; 4.75 m w:-1.2	283; 19.66 m	738; 2:26.44 min
—	Pamela Genesse (Canada) /Quebec	3960	595; 17.01 s w:+0.2	644; 1.52 m	532; 10.04 m	614; 28.21 s w:+2.2	495; 4.76 m w:-0.4	586; 35.77 m	494; 2:47.08 min
—	Klara Meierer (Canada) /Quebec	3862	688; 16.22 s w:+0.2	712; 1.58 m	497; 9.50 m	673; 27.47 s w:+2.4	557; 4.99 m w:-2.9	383; 25.04 m	352; 3:01.38 min
—	Marie-Hélène Lavallée-Bourget (Canada) /Quebec	3322	555; 17.37 s w:+0.2	544; 1.43 m	303; 6.50 m	628; 28.04 s w:+2.2	482; 4.71 m w:-0.7	243; 17.51 m	567; 2:40.55 min
—	Emery Terrell (Canada) /Ontario	2439	666; 16.40 s w:+0.2	644; 1.52 m	474; 9.15 m	655; 27.70 s w:+2.2	0 DNS	DNS	
DNF	Aisha Adams (athlete); United States	1756	985; 13.95 s w:+1.4	771; 1.63 m	0 DNS	DNS			
DNS	Audilia da Veiga /Martinique								

== Participation ==
An unofficial count yields the participation of 27 athletes from 10 countries. In addition, there was one invited athlete, and 15 local competitors as guests.

- Bermuda (1)
- Belize (1)
- Canada (7)
- Costa Rica (1)
- Cuba (4)
- Dominican Republic (1)
- Jamaica (1)
- Mexico (4)
- Peru (1)
- United States (6)

Invited:

- Nigeria (1)

== See also ==
- 2012 in athletics (track and field)
