= Athletics at the 2007 Pan American Games – Women's heptathlon =

Women's heptathlon at the Pan American Games

The women's heptathlon event at the 2007 Pan American Games was held on July 24–25.

== Medalists ==
Gold	Silver	Bronze
Jessica Zelinka; Canada	Gretchen Quintana; Cuba	Lucimara da Silva; Brazil

== Results ==
=== 100 metres hurdles ===
Wind:
Heat 1: −0.4 m/s, Heat 2: −0.6 m/s

Rank	Heat	Name	Nationality	Time	Points	Notes
1	1	Jessica Zelinka	Canada	13.26	1086	
2	1	Virginia Johnson	United States	13.53	1046	
3	1	Lucimara da Silva	Brazil	13.64	1030	
4	1	Gretchen Quintana	Cuba	13.83	1003	
5	2	Yasmiany Pedroso	Cuba	13.88	995	SB
6	2	Yaritza Rivera	Puerto Rico	13.95	985	
7	2	Hyleas Fountain	United States	14.05	971	
8	1	Juana Castillo	Dominican Republic	14.08	967	
9	1	Natoya Baird	Trinidad and Tobago	14.32	934	
10	2	Elizete da Silva	Brazil	14.53	905	
11	2	Daniela Crespo	Argentina	15.78	741	
12	2	Mirian Quiñonez	Ecuador	16.72	628	

=== High jump ===
Rank	Athlete	Nationality	1.50	1.53	1.56	1.59	1.62	1.65	1.68	1.71	1.74	1.77	Result	Points	Notes	Overall
1	Daniela Crespo	Argentina	–	–	–	o	o	o	o	xo	o	xxx	1.74	903		1644
1	Lucimara da Silva	Brazil	–	–	o	o	xo	o	o	o	o	xxx	1.74	903		1933
3	Yasmiany Pedroso	Cuba	o	–	–	o	o	o	o	o	xo	xxx	1.74	903		1898
4	Juana Castillo	Dominican Republic	–	–	o	–	o	o	xo	xo	xxo	xxx	1.74	903		1870
5	Gretchen Quintana	Cuba	–	–	o	–	o	–	xo	o	xxx		1.71	867		1870
6	Yaritza Rivera	Puerto Rico	–	o	–	–	o	o	xo	xo	xxx		1.71	867		1852
7	Natoya Baird	Trinidad and Tobago	–	–	–	o	xo	o	o	xxo	xxx		1.71	867		1801
7	Jessica Zelinka	Canada	–	–	–	–	–	–	xo	xxo	xxx		1.71	867		1953
9	Hyleas Fountain	United States	–	–	–	–	–	o	o	–	DNF		1.68	830		1801
10	Elizete da Silva	Brazil	–	o	o	o	xo	xxo	xxx				1.65	795		1700
11	Mirian Quiñonez	Ecuador	o	o	xo	xo	xxx						1.59	724		1352
12	Virginia Johnson	United States	–	–	–	xxo	xxx						1.59	724		1770

=== Shot put ===
Rank	Athlete	Nationality	#1	#2	#3	Result	Points	Notes	Overall
1	Jessica Zelinka	Canada	14.97	13.50	14.31	14.97	859	SB	2812
2	Yasmiany Pedroso	Cuba	14.12	13.64	14.12	14.12	802		2700
3	Juana Castillo	Dominican Republic	12.49	13.16	13.22	13.22	742		2612
4	Virginia Johnson	United States	12.13	13.19	12.88	13.19	740		2510
5	Gretchen Quintana	Cuba	13.04	12.92	12.24	13.04	730		2600
6	Elizete da Silva	Brazil	12.86	12.54	12.68	12.86	718		2418
7	Yaritza Rivera	Puerto Rico	12.41	11.45	11.19	12.41	688	SB	2540
8	Lucimara da Silva	Brazil	x	10.92	10.91	10.92	590		2523
9	Mirian Quiñonez	Ecuador	9.85	10.20	10.24	10.24	545		1897
10	Natoya Baird	Trinidad and Tobago	9.63	9.41	x	9.63	505		2306
11	Daniela Crespo	Argentina	8.86	9.38	x	9.38	489		2133
	Hyleas Fountain	United States				DNS	0		1801

=== 200 metres ===
Wind:
Heat 1: −0.4 m/s, Heat 2: −0.5 m/s

Rank	Heat	Name	Nationality	Time	Points	Notes	Overall
1	1	Gretchen Quintana	Cuba	23.90	990		3590
2	1	Jessica Zelinka	Canada	24.07	974		3786
3	2	Virginia Johnson	United States	24.15	966		3476
4	1	Lucimara da Silva	Brazil	24.76	909		3432
5	2	Elizete da Silva	Brazil	25.20	869		3287
6	1	Juana Castillo	Dominican Republic	25.26	863		3475
7	2	Yaritza Rivera	Puerto Rico	25.69	824		3364
8	2	Yasmiany Pedroso	Cuba	25.81	814		3514
9	2	Mirian Quiñonez	Ecuador	25.98	799		2696
10	2	Daniela Crespo	Argentina	26.30	771		2904
11	1	Natoya Baird	Trinidad and Tobago	26.59	746		3052

=== Long jump ===
Rank	Athlete	Nationality	#1	#2	#3	Result	Points	Notes	Overall
1	Gretchen Quintana	Cuba	6.24	5.97	5.68	6.24	924		4514
2	Virginia Johnson	United States	6.11	x	x	6.11	883		4359
3	Lucimara da Silva	Brazil	5.92	x	6.03	6.03	859		4291
4	Elizete da Silva	Brazil	5.73	x	5.75	5.75	774		4061
5	Yaritza Rivera	Puerto Rico	x	x	5.72	5.72	765		4129
6	Jessica Zelinka	Canada	5.57	5.60	5.70	5.70	759		4545
7	Yasmiany Pedroso	Cuba	5.63	5.57	5.62	5.63	738		4252
8	Daniela Crespo	Argentina	x	5.04	5.50	5.50	700		3604
9	Mirian Quiñonez	Ecuador	5.45	5.41	5.42	5.45	686		3382
10	Juana Castillo	Dominican Republic	5.35	5.24	5.19	5.35	657		4132
11	Natoya Baird	Trinidad and Tobago	4.65	4.89	4.87	4.89	530		3582

=== Javelin throw ===
Rank	Athlete	Nationality	#1	#2	#3	Result	Points	Notes	Overall
1	Lucimara da Silva	Brazil	44.78	x	x	44.78	759	SB	5050
2	Elizete da Silva	Brazil	44.15	42.49	40.18	44.15	747		4808
3	Jessica Zelinka	Canada	41.71	40.27	43.67	43.67	738	SB	5283
4	Yasmiany Pedroso	Cuba	37.86	42.73	41.80	42.73	720		4972
5	Juana Castillo	Dominican Republic	42.62	x	35.91	42.62	718		4850
6	Yaritza Rivera	Puerto Rico	36.56	31.03	32.72	36.56	601		4730
7	Gretchen Quintana	Cuba	x	33.25	35.79	35.79	587		5101
8	Virginia Johnson	United States	35.38	34.52	34.04	35.38	579		4938
9	Mirian Quiñonez	Ecuador	x	32.12	x	32.12	517		3899
10	Daniela Crespo	Argentina	26.59	28.61	29.97	29.97	476		4080
11	Natoya Baird	Trinidad and Tobago	x	26.78	x	26.78	416		3998

=== 800 metres ===
Rank	Name	Nationality	Time	Points	Notes
1	Gretchen Quintana	Cuba	2:14.53	899	
2	Daniela Crespo	Argentina	2:16.58	871	
3	Jessica Zelinka	Canada	2:17.86	853	
4	Lucimara da Silva	Brazil	2:20.01	823	
5	Yaritza Rivera	Puerto Rico	2:22.72	787	
6	Elizete da Silva	Brazil	2:25.10	756	
7	Yasmiany Pedroso	Cuba	2:27.87	720	
8	Virginia Johnson	United States	2:30.95	681	
9	Mirian Quiñonez	Ecuador	2:41.62	554	
	Natoya Baird	Trinidad and Tobago	DNS	0	
	Juana Castillo	Dominican Republic	DNS	0	

=== Final results ===
The highest mark recorded in each event is highlighted in yellow

Rank	Athlete	Nationality	100m H	HJ	SP	200m	LJ	JT	800m	Points	Notes
1st place, gold medalist(s)	Jessica Zelinka	Canada	13.26	1.71	14.97	24.07	5.70	43.67	2:17.86	6136	
2nd place, silver medalist(s)	Gretchen Quintana	Cuba	13.83	1.71	13.04	23.90	6.24	35.79	2:14.53	6000	
3rd place, bronze medalist(s)	Lucimara da Silva	Brazil	13.64	1.74	10.92	24.76	6.03	44.78	2:20.01	5873	
4	Yasmiany Pedroso	Cuba	13.88	1.74	14.12	25.81	5.63	42.73	2:27.87	5692	
5	Virginia Johnson	United States	13.53	1.59	13.19	24.15	6.11	35.38	2:30.95	5619	
6	Elizete da Silva	Brazil	14.53	1.65	12.86	25.20	5.75	44.15	2:25.10	5564	
7	Yaritza Rivera	Puerto Rico	13.95	1.71	12.41	25.69	5.72	36.56	2:22.72	5517	PB
8	Daniela Crespo	Argentina	15.78	1.74	9.38	26.30	5.50	29.97	2:16.58	4951	
9	Mirian Quiñonez	Ecuador	16.72	1.59	10.24	25.98	5.45	32.12	2:41.62	4453	
	Juana Castillo	Dominican Republic	14.08	1.74	13.22	25.26	5.35	42.62	DNS	DNF	
	Natoya Baird	Trinidad and Tobago	14.32	1.71	9.63	26.59	4.89	26.78	DNS	DNF	
	Hyleas Fountain	United States	14.05	1.68	DNS	–	–	–	–	DNF	
