= Athletics at the 2010 South American Games – Women's heptathlon =

The Women's Heptathlon event at the 2010 South American Games was held on March 20 and March 21.

== Medalists ==
Gold	Silver	Bronze
Agustina Zerboni; Argentina	Cynthia Alves; Brazil	Ana Camila Pirelli; Paraguay

== Records ==
Standing records prior to the 2010 South American Games
World record	Jackie Joyner-Kersee	United States	7291	Seoul, South Korea	24 September 1988
World Leading	Rebecca Wardell	New Zealand	5988	Christchurch, New Zealand	24 January 2010
South American record	Lucimara da Silva	Brazil	6076	Beijing, China	16 August 2008
South American U23 record	Vanessa Spinola	Brazil	5763	Bragança Paulista, Brazil	31 May 2009

== Results ==
Results and intermediate results after 6 events were published.

=== 100m Hurdles ===
Rank	Athlete	Nationality	Reaction	Result	Points
1	Agustina Zerboni	Argentina	0.175	13.65 SB	1028
2	Guillercy González	Venezuela	0.270	14.36	928
3	Cynthia Alves	Brazil	0.168	14.65	888
4	Carolina Castillo	Chile	0.268	14.77	872
5	Ana Camila Pirelli	Paraguay	0.229	15.29	804
6	Melissa Valencia	Colombia	0.206	15.75	745
7	Cindy Vega	Colombia	0.384	17.12	583
–	Vanessa Spinola	Brazil	0.222	DNF	
			Wind: +1.2 m/s		

=== High Jump ===
Rank	Athlete	Nationality	Attempt									Best Result	Points
Rank	Athlete	Nationality	1.45	1.48	1.51	1.54	1.57	1.60	1.63	1.66	1.69	Best Result	Points
1	Agustina Zerboni	Argentina	–	o	o	o	o	o	xxo	xo	xx–	1.66	806
2	Ana Camila Pirelli	Paraguay	–	o	o	o	o	o	o	xxo	xxx	1.66	806
3	Guillercy González	Venezuela	–	o	xo	xo	xo	xxo	xo	xxx		1.63	771
4	Cynthia Alves	Brazil	–	o	o	o	o	xo	xxo	xxx		1.63	771
5	Carolina Castillo	Chile	–	–	o	o	xxo	xo	xxx			1.63	627
6	Melissa Valencia	Colombia	o	o	o	o	o	xxx				1.57	701
7	Cindy Vega	Colombia	o	xo	xo	o	xxx					1.54	602

=== Shot Put ===
Rank	Athlete	Nationality	Attempt			Best Result	Points
Rank	Athlete	Nationality	1	2	3	Best Result	Points
1	Cynthia Alves	Brazil	x	11.99	12.42	12.42	689
2	Ana Camila Pirelli	Paraguay	x	10.32	11.89	11.89	654
3	Agustina Zerboni	Argentina	11.07	11.01	11.18	11.18	607
4	Guillercy González	Venezuela	9.61	9.73	10.85	10.85	585
5	Melissa Valencia	Colombia	9.10	9.41	x	9.41	491
6	Carolina Castillo	Chile	9.03	9.37	8.86	9.37	488
7	Cindy Vega	Colombia	7.77	7.75	7.92	7.92	394

=== 200m ===
Rank	Athlete	Nationality	Reaction	Result	Points
1	Agustina Zerboni	Argentina	0.206	24.60	924
2	Melissa Valencia	Colombia	0.194	25.19	849
3	Guillercy González	Venezuela	0.264	25.42	849
4	Cindy Vega	Colombia	0.329	25.74	820
5	Cynthia Alves	Brazil	0.276	25.79	816
6	Carolina Castillo	Chile	0.223	26.31	770
7	Ana Camila Pirelli	Paraguay	0.214	26.57	748
			Wind: +1.3 m/s		

=== Long Jump ===
Rank	Athlete	Nationality	Attempt			Best Result	Points
Rank	Athlete	Nationality	1	2	3	Best Result	Points
1	Guillercy González	Venezuela	5.43	5.63	5.62	5.63 wind: -0.6 m/s	738
2	Melissa Valencia	Colombia	5.62	x	x	5.62 wind: -0.7 m/s	735
3	Agustina Zerboni	Argentina	5.20	5.55	5.43	5.55 wind: -0.2 m/s	715
4	Cynthia Alves	Brazil	5.36	5.07	5.21	5.36 wind: +0.9 m/s	660
5	Carolina Castillo	Chile	5.26	5.35	5.20	5.35 wind: +0.0 m/s	657
6	Ana Camila Pirelli	Paraguay	5.16	x	5.29	5.29 wind: -0.7 m/s	640
7	Cindy Vega	Colombia	x	5.17	5.12	5.17 wind: +0.3 m/s	606

=== Javelin Throw ===
Rank	Athlete	Nationality	Attempt			Best Result	Points
Rank	Athlete	Nationality	1	2	3	Best Result	Points
1	Ana Camila Pirelli	Paraguay	34.06	39.62	41.09	41.09	688
2	Cynthia Alves	Brazil	36.67	38.19	x	38.19	633
3	Agustina Zerboni	Argentina	31.06	33.43	34.89	34.89	570
4	Carolina Castillo	Chile	27.35	30.39	33.89	33.89	550
5	Guillercy González	Venezuela	28.44	27.16	27.33	28.44	447
6	Cindy Vega	Colombia	24.77	x	x	24.77	378
7	Melissa Valencia	Colombia	x	21.63	23.92	23.92	362

=== 800m ===
Rank	Athlete	Nationality	Result	Points
1	Guillercy González	Venezuela	2:22.12	795
2	Ana Camila Pirelli	Paraguay	2:23.41	778
3	Cynthia Alves	Brazil	2:27.10	730
4	Carolina Castillo	Chile	2:28.30	714
5	Agustina Zerboni	Argentina	2:28.49	712
6	Cindy Vega	Colombia	2:40.02	573
7	Melissa Valencia	Colombia	2:43.22	536

=== Final standing ===
Rank	Athlete	Nationality	100H	HJ	SP	200m	LJ	JT	800m	Total
1st place, gold medalist(s)	Agustina Zerboni	Argentina	1028	806	607	924	715	570	570	5362
2nd place, silver medalist(s)	Cynthia Alves	Brazil	888	771	689	816	660	633	633	5187
3rd place, bronze medalist(s)	Ana Camila Pirelli	Paraguay	804	806	654	748	640	688	688	5118
4	Guillercy González	Venezuela	928	771	585	849	738	447	447	5113
5	Carolina Castillo	Chile	872	736	488	770	657	550	550	4787
6	Melissa Valencia	Colombia	745	701	491	869	735	362	362	4439
7	Cindy Vega	Colombia	583	666	394	820	606	378	378	4020
–	Vanessa Spinola	Brazil	DNF	DNS						DNF

== See also ==
- 2010 South American Under-23 Championships in Athletics
