= 2006 South American Youth Championships in Athletics =

XVIII South American Youth Championships in Athletics
- Dates: October 14–15
- Host city: Caracas, Venezuela
- Venue: Estadio Brígido Iriarte
- Level: Youth
- Events: 42
- Participation: about 281 athletes from 13 nations

The 18th South American Youth Championships in Athletics were held in Caracas, Venezuela from October 14–15, 2006. The event was relocated from the Estadio Pueblo Nuevo in San Cristóbal, Táchira, Venezuela, because the renovation of the stadium for the Copa América de Fútbol 2007 was not yet completed. A detailed report on the results was given.

== Medal summary ==
Medal winners are published. Complete results can be found on the Fecodatle, and on the "World Junior Athletics History" website.

=== Men ===
Event	Gold		Silver		Bronze	
100 metres (wind: +0.0 m/s)	Alonso Edward (PAN)	10.60	Álvaro Gómez (COL)	10.61	Jefferson Lucindo (BRA)	10.63
200 metres (wind: +0.0 m/s)	Alonso Edward (PAN)	21.18	Rodrigo Patativa (BRA)	21.40	César Marchan (VEN)	21.67
400 metres	Juan López (CHI)	47.55	Henrique de Souza (BRA)	47.75	Heisber Landaeta (VEN)	47.79
800 metres	Heisber Landaeta (VEN)	1:53.89	Daniel Palma (CHI)	1:54.13	Deivid Silva (BRA)	1:56.02
1500 metres	Eduardo Gregório (URU)	3:59.64	Daniel Palma (CHI)	3:59.74	Mauricio Valdivia (CHI)	4:00.81
3000 metres	Luis Orta (VEN)	8:41.99	Victor Aravena (CHI)	8:43.81	Fabián Cajamarca (ECU)	8:50.62
2000 metres steeplechase	Luis Orta (VEN)	5:52.78	Iván López (CHI)	5:53.46	Mauricio Valdivia (CHI)	5:53.51
110 metres hurdles (wind: +0.0 m/s)	Edward Quintana (COL)	13.99	Thompson de Oliveira (BRA)	14.07	John Vale (VEN)	14.34
400 metres hurdles	Juan López (CHI)	52.94	Geormys Jaramillo (VEN)	53.57	Tiago de Souza (BRA)	53.64
High jump	Robert Lanz (VEN)	2.05	Cristóbal Gómez (CHI)	2.02	Carlos Izquierdo (COL)	2.02
Pole vault	Rodrigo Tenorio (CHI)	4.65	Ruben Benítez (ARG)	4.60	George Sanches (BRA)	4.20
Long jump	Edward Quintana (COL)	7.39 (wind: +0.0 m/s)	Fernando da Cunha (BRA)	7.23 (wind: +0.0 m/s)	Jamal Bowen (PAN)	7.16 (wind: -1.3 m/s)
Triple jump	Carlos Méndez (ECU)	15.10 (wind: +0.5 m/s)	Fernando da Cunha (BRA)	14.55 (wind: +0.0 m/s)	Bruno Matias (BRA)	14.38 (wind: +0.0 m/s)
Shot put	Juan Romero (VEN)	17.95	Eder Moreno (COL)	17.91	Nicolás Martina (ARG)	17.85
Discus throw	Luís Schneider (BRA)	53.70	Gerardo Márquez (VEN)	51.13	Franklin Abreu (VEN)	50.47
Hammer throw	Marco Requena (VEN)	64.15	Alan Melo (BRA)	62.71	Gerónimo Ojeda (ARG)	61.17
Javelin throw	Emmer Brizuela (VEN)	58.30	Jackson de Oliveira (BRA)	58.25	Jhon Valencia (COL)	57.88
Octathlon	José Raúl Matagira (COL)	5798	Diego Ferrin (ECU)	5750	Damian Benedetich (ARG)	5665
10000 metres Walk	Washington Alvarado (ECU)	46:04.50	Ricardo Lojan (ECU)	46:05.49	Dejaime de Oliveira (BRA)	46:25.08
4 x 100 metres relay	Brazil; Eric de Jesús; Rodrigo Patativa; Jeferson Celis; Jefferson Lucindo	40.92	Panama; Jamal Bowen; Alberto Perriman; Erick Zuleta; Alonso Edward	41.96	Chile; Hans Weisser; Sebastian Díaz; Fernando Gómez; Felipe Covarubias	42.11
1000 metres Medley relay	Brazil; Jefferson Lucindo; Rodrigo Patativa; Wagner Cardoso; Henrique de Souza	1:53.67	Venezuela; Alvaro Cassiani; César Marchan; Osbel Meza; Heisber Landaeta	1:54.20	Chile; Felipe Covarubias; Fernando Gómez; Sebastian Díaz; Juan López	1:56.37

=== Women ===
Event	Gold		Silver		Bronze	
100 metres (wind: +0.4 m/s)	Bárbara Leôncio (BRA)	11.82	Rosângela Santos (BRA)	11.95	Nelcy Caicedo (COL)	12.01
200 metres (wind: +0.0 m/s)	Bárbara Leôncio (BRA)	24.26	Nelcy Caicedo (COL)	24.58	Erika Chávez (ECU)	24.59
400 metres	Erika Chávez (ECU)	55.48	Keila Escobar (COL)	56.11	Magdalena Mendoza (VEN)	56.68
800 metres	Rocío Sueldo (ARG)	2:15.54	Thayra dos Santos (BRA)	2:15.88	Evangelina Thomas (ARG)	2:15.96
1500 metres	Evangelina Thomas (ARG)	4:34.24	Viviana Acosta (ECU)	4:43.77	Dayana Magdalen Pérez (VEN)	4:44.73
3000 metres	Viviana Acosta (ECU)	10:28.15	Veronica Ángel (CHI)	10:37.45	Rosario Romero (PER)	10:37.94
2000 metres steeplechase	Tatiane da Silva (BRA)	6:57.72	Luz Moreno (COL)	7:05.63	Pamela Chibiroga (ECU)	7:11.23
100 metres hurdles (wind: +0.0 m/s)	Evelyn da Silva (BRA)	13.80	Ljubica Milos (CHI)	14.22	Cecilia Rivera (CHI)	14.45
400 metres hurdles	Keila Escobar (COL)	61.26	Magdalena Mendoza (VEN)	62.06	Maria MacAuliffe (CHI)	62.96
High jump	Aline Santos (BRA)	1.69	Tamara Maass (CHI)	1.69	Katherine Alcívar (ECU)	1.69
Pole vault	Valeria Chiaraviglio (ARG)	3.45	Aline Silva (BRA)	3.30	Eliana Martínez (COL)	3.30
Long jump	Bianca Leguizamon (PAR)	5.67 (wind: NWI)	Leticia Gaspar (BRA)	5.59 (wind: +0.0 m/s)	Feber Hernández (VEN)	5.52 (wind: +0.0 m/s)
Triple jump	Simona de Oliveira (BRA)	12.63 (wind: +0.0 m/s)	Feber Hernández (VEN)	12.02 (wind: +0.0 m/s)	Kelly Lucumí (COL)	11.87 (wind: +0.0 m/s)
Shot put	Natalia Duco (CHI)	15.67	Soila Tosta (BRA)	12.32	Angela Rivas (COL)	12.19
Discus throw	Natalia Duco (CHI)	39.31	Belen Domke (ARG)	38.34	Uclécia da Silva (BRA)	38.17
Hammer throw	Emilce Pesce (ARG)	47.98	Durkina Freites (VEN)	47.01	Regiane de Souza (BRA)	44.90
Javelin throw	Katryna Subeldia (PAR)	46.22	Lilian Seibert (BRA)	44.74	Miriam Mina (ECU)	43.81
Heptathlon	Camila Pirelli (PAR)	4790	Giovana Cavaleti (BRA)	4679	Camelia Cuba (VEN)	4580
5000 metres Walk	Anlly Pineda (COL)	24:46.26	Maria Rayo (COL)	24:48.28	Adriana Velázquez (ECU)	25:18.38
4 x 100 metres relay	Brazil; Leticia Gaspar; Bárbara Leôncio; Bianca dos Santos; Rosângela Santos	46.20	Venezuela; María Virginia Sandoval; Yuriani Maya; Yarel Campos; María José Viloria	47.36	Chile; Maria Dittborn; Cecilia Rivera; Stephanie Matute; Violeta Cueto	48.16
1000 metres Medley relay	Brazil; Rosângela Santos; Bárbara Leôncio; Kamila Miranda; Priscila de Lima	2:12.03	Colombia; Daniela Sánchez; Nelcy Caicedo; Anis Canola; Keila Escobar	2:13.75	Venezuela; María Virginia Sandoval; Yuriani Maya; Idanis Nava; Magdalena Mendoza	2:15.60

== Medal table (unofficial) ==
* Host nation (Venezuela)

Rank	Nation	Gold	Silver	Bronze	Total
1	Brazil (BRA)	11	14	8	33
2	Venezuela (VEN)*	7	7	9	23
3	Chile (CHI)	5	8	7	20
4	Colombia (COL)	5	7	6	18
5	Ecuador (ECU)	4	3	6	13
6	Argentina (ARG)	4	2	4	10
7	Paraguay (PAR)	3	0	0	3
8	Panama (PAN)	2	1	1	4
9	Uruguay (URU)	1	0	0	1
10	Peru (PER)	0	0	1	1
Totals (10 entries)		42	42	42	126

== Team trophies ==
The placing tables for team trophy (overall team, men and women categories) were published.

=== Total ===
The host country is highlighted in lavender blue

Rank	Nation	Points
1st place, gold medalist(s)	Brazil	196
2nd place, silver medalist(s)	Venezuela	135
3rd place, bronze medalist(s)	Chile	116
4	Colombia	97
5	Ecuador	72.5
6	Argentina	52
7	(Panama) Panamá	28
8	Paraguay	23
9	(Peru) Perú	21.5
10	Uruguay	12
11	Guyana	1

=== Male ===
The host country is highlighted in lavender blue

Rank	Nation	Points
1st place, gold medalist(s)	Brazil	90
2nd place, silver medalist(s)	Venezuela	83
3rd place, bronze medalist(s)	Chile	59
4	Colombia	54
5	(Panama) Panamá	26
6	Ecuador	25
7	Uruguay	12
8	Argentina	8
9	(Peru) Perú	7

=== Female ===
The host country is highlighted in lavender blue

Rank	Nation	Points
1st place, gold medalist(s)	Brazil	106
2nd place, silver medalist(s)	Chile	57
3rd place, bronze medalist(s)	Venezuela	52
4	Ecuador	47.5
5	Argentina	44
6	Colombia	43
7	Paraguay	23
8	(Peru) Perú	14.5
9	(Panama) Panamá	2
10	Guyana	1

== Participation (unofficial) ==
Detailed result lists can be found on the Fecodatle, and on the "World Junior Athletics History" website. An unofficial count yields the number of about 281 athletes from about 13 countries:

- Argentina (16)
- Bolivia (5)
- Brazil (67)
- Chile (42)
- Colombia (36)
- Ecuador (26)
- Guyana (2)
- (Panama) Panamá (6)
- Paraguay (4)
- (Peru) Perú (17)
- Suriname (2)
- Uruguay (5)
- Venezuela (53)
