= 2007 South American Junior Championships in Athletics =

XXXVII South American Junior Championships in Athletics
- Dates: June 30-July 1 July 6–8
- Host city: São Paulo, Brazil
- Venue: Estádio Ícaro de Castro Melo
- Level: Junior
- Events: 44
- Participation: about 224 athletes from 12 nations

The 37th South American Junior Championships in Athletics (Campeonatos Sudamericanos de Atletismo de Juveniles) were held at the Estádio Ícaro de Castro Melo in São Paulo, Brazil from June 30-July 1, 2007. The Champions for men's 10,000m, both Race Walking and Combined Events were extracted from the classification of the 2007 Pan American Junior Athletics Championships held at the same site one week later from July 6 to July 8, 2007. A detailed report on the results was given. Best performances were the two South American Junior records by Alonso Edward from Panamá in 10.28s in the men's 100m competition, and Jorge McFarlane from Perú who achieved 13.76s (0.0 m/s) in the first heat in 110m hurdles men.

== Participation (unofficial) ==
Detailed result lists can be found on the CBAt website, and on the "World Junior Athletics History" website. An unofficial count yields the number of about 224 athletes from about 12 countries: Argentina (20), Bolivia (3), Brazil (72), Chile (34), Colombia (28), Ecuador (17), Guyana (3), Panama (3), Paraguay (9), Peru (10), Uruguay (2), Venezuela (23).

== Medal summary ==
Medal winners are published on the CACAC website, on the IAAF website Complete results can be found on the CBAt website, on a session by session base and on the "World Junior Athletics History" website.

=== Men ===
Event	Gold		Silver		Bronze	
100 metres (0.0 m/s)	Alonso Edward (PAN)	10.28 ARj	Álvaro Gómez (COL)	10.47 NRj	Dax Danns (GUY)	10.48
200 metres (-0.2 m/s)	Dax Danns (GUY)	21.27	Helder Alves (BRA)	21.35	Jhon Riascos (COL)	21.53
400 metres	Juan Maturana (COL)	47.25	Helder Alves (BRA)	47.62	Tássio Gomes (BRA)	47.94
800 metres	Lutimar Paes (BRA)	1:50.95	José Figueira (BRA)	1:52.04	Diego Rincon (COL)	1:52.51
1500 metres	Marvin Blanco (VEN)	3:54.71	Fábio Queiroz (BRA)	3:55.21	Lutimar Paes (BRA)	3:56.82
5000 metres	Robson de Lima (BRA)	15:01.05	Jefferson Peña (COL)	15:02.53	Luis Orta (VEN)	15:04.58
10000 metres	Jefferson Peña (COL)	31:06.05	Ademilson de Moraes Santana (BRA)	31:28.28	Christopher Guajardo (CHI)	32:13.74
3000 metres steeplechase	Marvin Blanco (VEN)	9:16.75	Luis Orta (VEN)	9:18.26	Derlis Ayala (PAR)	9:29.49
110 metres hurdles (0.0 m/s)	Jorge McFarlane (PER)	13.94	José Raúl Matagira (COL)	14.23 NRj	Diego de Araújo (BRA)	14.33
400 metres hurdles	Juan Maturana (COL)	52.43	Delcio da Fraga (BRA)	52.95	Geormys Jaramillo (VEN)	53.55
High jump	Diego Ferrin (ECU)	2.12	Cristóbal Gómez (CHI)	2.06	Simon Villa (COL)	1.98
Pole vault	Rodrigo Tenorio (CHI)	4.80	Igor Morales (VEN)	4.50	Rubén Benítez (ARG)	4.50
Long jump	Jorge McFarlane (PER)	7.52 (-0.6 m/s)	Alafans Delfino (BRA)	7.49 (0.9 m/s)	Diego Ferrin (ECU)	7.43 (0.8 m/s)
Triple jump	Alafans Delfino (BRA)	15.53 (0.1 m/s)	Fabian Padron (VEN)	14.95 (0.9 m/s)	Carlos Méndez (ECU)	14.81 (0.7 m/s)
Shot put	Josnner Ortíz (VEN)	17.88	Eder Moreno (COL)	17.28	Juan Romero (VEN)	16.68
Discus throw	Luís Schneider (BRA)	52.44	Gerson dos Santos (BRA)	52.31	Mariano Etchehandy (ARG)	49.76
Hammer throw	Marco Requena (VEN)	61.00	Gabriel Hohnke (BRA)	57.24	Rubén Kaufmann (ARG)	56.07
Javelin throw	Victor Fatecha (PAR)	73.07 CR	Vicente García (CHI)	61.52	Roberto Zarraga (VEN)	59.03
Decathlon	Diego de Araújo (BRA)	7100	José Matagira (COL)	6778	Damian Benedetich (ARG)	6447
10000 metres Walk	Mauricio Arteaga (ECU)	43.30.64	Dejaime Cesar de Oliveira (BRA)	44.09.01	Claudio Villanueva (ECU)	44.24.35
4 x 100 metres relay	Colombia; Jhon Riascos; Álvaro Gómez; Vladimir Valencia; Juan Maturana	40.48 NRj	Brazil; Ailson Feitosa; Jefferson Lucindo; Rodrigo Patativa; Jeferson Carvalho	40.66	Chile; Javier Vivar; Fernando Gómez; Diego Ramos; Santiago Luna	41.78
4 x 400 metres relay	Brazil; Wagner Cardoso; Tássio Gomes; Henrique de Souza; Helder Alves	3:08.68	Chile; Daniel Palma; Diego Ramos; Fernando Gómez; Javier Vivar	3:13.85	Venezuela; Raúl López; Lucirio Francisco Garrido; Geormys Jaramillo; Heisber Landaeta	3:15.26

=== Women ===
Event	Gold		Silver		Bronze	
100 metres (0.0 m/s)	Rosângela Santos (BRA)	11.56	Bárbara Leôncio (BRA)	11.79	Yomara Hinestroza (COL)	11.89
200 metres (0.0 m/s)	Bárbara Leôncio (BRA)	23.69	Alejandra Idrobo (COL)	23.97	Ana da Silva (BRA)	24.05
400 metres	Alejandra Idrobo (COL)	54.24	Elaine Paixão (BRA)	54.80	Keila Escobar (COL)	54.92
800 metres	Madeleine Rondón (VEN)	2:09.43	Geisiane de Lima (BRA)	2:10.48	Thayra dos Santos (BRA)	2:11.20
1500 metres	Evangelina Thomas (ARG)	4:45.30	Mônica Possu (COL)	4:46.32	Geisiane de Lima (BRA)	4:47.70
3000 metres	Viviana Acosta (ECU)	10:18.35	Rocío Huillca (PER)	10:18.41	Claudia Ramírez (URU)	10:19.94
5000 metres	Claudia Ramírez (URU)	18:18.32	Francisca Alarcón (CHI)	18:32.13	Luz Moreno (COL)	18:41.82
3000 metres steeplechase	Rocío Huillca (PER)	11:11.57	Yeimy Ganzalez (COL)	11:11.85	Luz Moreno (COL)	11:30.82
100 metres hurdles (0.0 m/s)	Gisele de Albuquerque (BRA)	13.96	Ljubica Milos (CHI)	14.00	Jéssica de Souza (BRA)	14.08
400 metres hurdles	Keila Escobar (COL)	59.26	Magdalena Mendoza (VEN)	60.29	Elaine Paixão (BRA)	60.41
High jump	Tamara Maass (CHI)	1.75	Valdileia Martins (BRA)	1.70	Aline Santos (BRA); Gabriela Saravia (PER)	1.70
Pole vault	Keisa Monterola (VEN)	4.15 CR	Diana Leyton (COL)	3.80	Raissa Schubert (BRA)	3.65
Long jump	Vanessa Spínola (BRA)	5.79 (-1.6 m/s)	Guillercy González (VEN)	5.54 (-1.5 m/s)	Karine Farias (BRA)	5.50 (1.4 m/s)
Triple jump	Gisele de Albuquerque (BRA)	12.95 (-1.1 m/s)	Feber Hernández (VEN)	12.53 (-1.6 m/s)	Simona de Oliveira (BRA)	12.35 (-0.3 m/s)
Shot put	Natalia Ducó (CHI)	16.67 CR	Renata Severiano (BRA)	13.22	Jéssica Gouvêa (BRA)	13.05
Discus throw	Fernanda Raquel Borges (BRA)	44.44	Luz Montaño (COL)	43.51	Samantha da Cuñha (BRA)	41.61
Hammer throw	Marynna Dias (BRA)	57.14	Carla Michel (BRA)	54.31	Durkina Freites (VEN)	53.59
Javelin throw	Jucilene de Lima (BRA)	47.53	Katryna Subeldía (PAR)	45.45	María Paz Ríos (CHI)	45.06
Heptathlon	Giovana Aparecida Cavaleti (BRA)	4957	Ana Camila Pirelli (PAR)	4873	Josiane Valentim (BRA)	4779
10000 metres Walk	Ingrid Hernández (COL)	48.48.24	Fariluz Morales (PER)	54.39.28	Aline Luisa Sausen (BRA)	56.40.81
4 x 100 metres relay	Brazil; Josiane Valentim; Bárbara Leôncio; Ana da Silva; Rosângela Santos	44.42 CR	Colombia; Nelcy Caicedo; Alejandra Idrobo; Yomara Hinestroza; Keila Escobar	45.71	Argentina; Jacqueline Rombaldoni; Jesica Torres; Juliana Menéndez; María Belén Ocampo	47.27
4 x 400 metres relay	Brazil; Kamila Miranda; Natália Oliveira; Liliane dos Santos; Elaine Paixão	3:43.44	Argentina; Jacqueline Rombaldoni; Juliana Menéndez; María Belén Ocampo; Jesica Torres	3:50.43	Colombia; Keila Escobar; Anis Canola; Alejandra Idrobo; Yomara Hinestroza	3:50.61

== Medal table (unofficial) ==
The medal count was published.

* Host nation (Brazil)

Rank	Nation	Gold	Silver	Bronze	Total
1	Brazil*	17	17	16	50
2	Colombia	7	11	8	26
3	Venezuela	6	6	6	18
4	Chile	3	5	3	11
5	Peru	3	2	1	6
6	Ecuador	3	0	3	6
7	Paraguay	1	2	1	4
8	Argentina	1	1	5	7
9	Guyana	1	0	1	2
9	Uruguay	1	0	1	2
11	Panama	1	0	0	1
Totals (11 entries)		44	44	45	133

== Team trophies ==
The placing tables for team trophy (overall team, men and women categories) were published.

=== Total ===
The host country is highlighted in lavender blue

Rank	Nation	Points
1st place, gold medalist(s)	Brazil	453
2nd place, silver medalist(s)	Colombia	248
3rd place, bronze medalist(s)	Venezuela	187
4	Chile	167.5
5	Ecuador	82
6	Argentina	81
7	Peru	53.5
8	Paraguay	35
9	Guyana	14
9	Uruguay	14
11	Panama	12
12	Bolivia	9

=== Male ===
The host country is highlighted in lavender blue

Rank	Nation	Points
1st place, gold medalist(s)	Brazil	200.5
2nd place, silver medalist(s)	Colombia	133
3rd place, bronze medalist(s)	Venezuela	126
4	Chile	106.5
5	Ecuador	53
6	Argentina	36
7	Peru	25
8	Paraguay	16
9	Guyana	14
10	Panama	12
11	Bolivia	5

=== Female ===
The host country is highlighted in lavender blue

Rank	Nation	Points
1st place, gold medalist(s)	Brazil	252.5
2nd place, silver medalist(s)	Colombia	115
3rd place, bronze medalist(s)	Chile	61
3rd place, bronze medalist(s)	Venezuela	61
5	Argentina	45
6	Ecuador	29
7	Peru	28.5
8	Paraguay	19
9	Uruguay	14
10	Bolivia	4

=== Individual ===
The trophies for the most outstanding performance were awarded to Juan Pablo Maturana (Colombia), gold medalist in the men's 400m, 400m hurdles, and 4 × 100 m relay events, and to Giselle Marcolino de Albuquerque (Brazil), gold medalist in the women's 100m hurdles and triple jump events.
