= Alonso Edward =

Panamanian sprinter (born 1989)

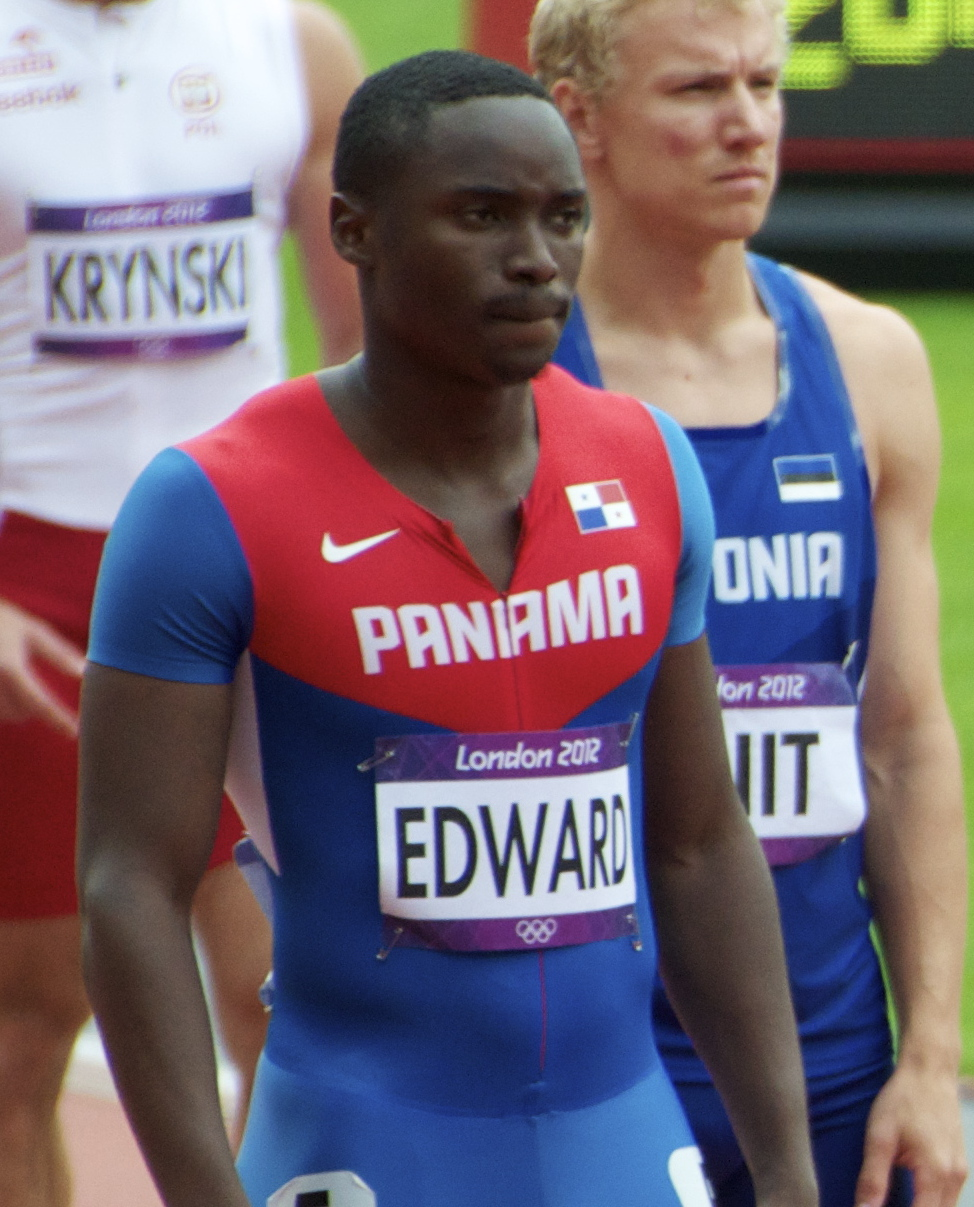

Personal information
- Full name: Alonso Reno Edward Henry
- Born: 8 December 1989 (age 36) Panama City, Panama
- Height: 1.80 m (5 ft 11 in)
- Weight: 77 kg (170 lb)

Sport
- Sport: Running
- Event: Sprints
- Coached by: Lance Brauman

Achievements and titles
- Personal bests: 100 m: 10.01 (Cochabamba 2018); 200 m: 19.81 (Berlin 2009)
Medal record
Men's athletics
Representing Panama
World Championships
Silver medal – second place	2009 Berlin	200 m
Pan American Games
Bronze medal – third place	2015 Toronto	200 m
South American Games
Gold medal – first place	2014 Santiago	100 m
Gold medal – first place	2018 Cochabamba	100 m
South American Championships
Gold medal – first place	2009 Lima	100 m
Gold medal – first place	2009 Lima	200 m
Silver medal – second place	2023 São Paulo	200 m
Bronze medal – third place	2007 São Paulo	4 × 100 m relay
Central American and Caribbean Games
Silver medal – second place	2018 Barranquilla	200 m
Bronze medal – third place	2023 San Salvador	200 m
Central American Games
Gold medal – first place	2010 Panama City	100 m
Gold medal – first place	2013 San José	200 m
Central American Championships
Gold medal – first place	2012 Managua	200 m
South American Junior Championships
Gold medal – first place	2007 São Paulo	100 m
South American Youth Championships
Gold medal – first place	2006 Caracas	100 m
Gold medal – first place	2006 Caracas	200 m
Silver medal – second place	2006 Caracas	4 × 100 m relay
Representing Americas
Continental Cup
Gold medal – first place	2014 Marrakesh	200 m
Gold medal – first place	2018 Ostrava	200 m
- Updated on 9 Sep 2018

Alonso Reno Edward Henry (born 8 December 1989), commonly known as Alonso Edward,^{[nb]} is a Panamanian sprinter who specialises in the 100 and 200 metres.

He set a South American junior record in the 100 m in 2007. Edward competed in his first World Junior Championships in 2008, finishing in sixth place. He made significant improvements in the 2009 season, setting national records in the 100 m and 200 m in May and winning both events at the 2009 South American Championships in Athletics. Prior to the 2009 World Championships, he again beat the 200 m national record, becoming the fourth fastest runner of the season. At his first ever World Championships, he set a South American record to win the silver medal in the 200 metres final, becoming the youngest ever medallist in that event.

== Early career ==
Born in Panama City, Panamá, Edward is of Jamaican descent on his mother's side. He was initially coached by Cecilio Woodruf in his home country and came to prominence on the youth and junior athletics circuit, winning a 100/200 m double at the South American Youth Championships and the 100 m gold at the 2007 South American Junior Championships. His time of 10.28 seconds, at the junior championships, was a new South American junior record, improving upon his own previous mark. He also attended the 2007 Pan American Junior Championships, but pulled up in the heats. Following in the footsteps of fellow Panamanian athlete Irving Saladino, he moved to train in Brazil but an injury interrupted the start of his season, all but eliminating his chances to qualify for the 2008 Summer Olympics. While recovering, Edward moved to the United States and enrolled with Barton County Community College in Great Bend, Kansas, working under the tutelage of Matt Kane. He made his first appearance at a world competition; the 2008 World Junior Championships in Athletics. A season's best run of 10.91 seconds in the 100 m saw him eliminated in the heats stage.

== Breakthrough season ==
In the 2009 athletics season, Edward had markedly improved from the previous season: at the Texas Invitational meet in early May, he ran 9.97 seconds to break the 10-second barrier, with the wind assistance just over the legal limit (2.3 m/s). Later that month he broke two national records, running 10.09 seconds in the 100 m and 20.34 seconds in the 200 m at a meet in Hutchinson, Kansas. The following month he proved his ability to win at the senior regional level, taking two gold medals in a sprint double at the 2009 South American Championships in Athletics. He beat the competition in the 200 m by almost half a second, finishing with 20.45 seconds.

Further improvements came in the 200 m in Rethymno in July, as he broke his own national record to win in twenty seconds flat. This time ranked him as fourth fastest in the world coming into the 2009 World Championships in Athletics, with only Usain Bolt, Tyson Gay, and Wallace Spearmon running faster.

In the 200 metres at the World Championships, Edward reached a new level of performance. Touted as a possible surprise finalist, he started well, winning his heat and his quarter-final. In the semi-finals, he finished second to Usain Bolt and was the third fastest of the round overall, after Spearmon, with a run of 20.22 seconds. Although Bolt won the final race by a margin of 0.62 seconds to set a new world record, Edward set a South American record of 19.81 seconds. He had started the season with a best of 20.62 seconds, but he had improved by 0.81 seconds in just one year, breaking Bolt's previous record for the fastest time by a 19-year-old and becoming the youngest ever World Championship medallist in the men's 200 m in the process.

Prior to the 2010 season, Edward decided that he would miss the 2010 World Indoor Championships in Athletics in favour of focusing upon the first IAAF Diamond League, keen to become the first South American to break the 10-second barrier. He began his outdoor season in April, winning the 100 m gold at the Central American Games in Panama, but he suffered a strained hamstring in the 200 m and missed much of the year through the injury.

== Personal bests ==
Event	Time (sec)	Venue	Date
100 metres	10.01 s	Cochabamba, Bolivia	6 June 2018
200 metres	19.81 s	Berlin, Germany	20 August 2009
200 metres (indoor)	20.70 s	Fayetteville, United States	23 January 2010

- All information taken from IAAF profile.

=== Track records ===
As of September 2024, Edward holds the following track records for 100 metres and 200 metres.

==== 100 metres ====
Location	Time	Windspeed m/s	Date
Cochabamba	10.01; PB	–0.7	06/06/2018

==== 200 metres ====
Location	Time	Windspeed m/s	Date	Notes
Barranquilla	19.96	+0.4	31/07/2018	
Georgetown	20.00	+0.3	07/05/2014	
Marrakesh	19.98	+0.2	14/09/2014	Track record is shared with Rasheed Dwyer (JAM) from the same race.
Rabat	20.07	+3.8	22/05/2016	
Rethymno	20.00	+1.3	20/07/2009	

== Competition record ==
Year	Competition	Venue	Position	Event	Notes
Representing Panama
2006	Central American Junior; Championships (U20)	Guatemala City, Guatemala	2nd	100 m	11.05 (wind: -0.7 m/s)
2006	Central American Junior; Championships (U20)	Guatemala City, Guatemala	3rd	200 m	22.07 (wind: +0.7 m/s)
2006	South American Youth Championships	Caracas, Venezuela	1st	100 m	10.60 s (wind: +0.0 m/s)
2006	South American Youth Championships	Caracas, Venezuela	1st	200 m	21.18 s (wind: +0.0 m/s)
2006	South American Youth Championships	Caracas, Venezuela	2nd	4 × 100 m	41.96 s
2006	South American Youth Championships	Caracas, Venezuela	6th	1000 m medley relay	2:03.41 min
2007	ALBA Games	Caracas, Venezuela	1st	100 m	10.25 s w (wind: +2.3 m/s)
2007	ALBA Games	Caracas, Venezuela	2nd	200 m	20.62 s NR NR-j (wind: +2.0 m/s)
2007	ALBA Games	Caracas, Venezuela	2nd	4 × 100 m relay	40.07 s
2007	Central American Junior; Championships (U20)	San Salvador, El Salvador	1st	100 m	10.59 (wind: -2.9 m/s)
2007	Central American Junior; Championships (U20)	San Salvador, El Salvador	1st	200 m	21.08 (wind: -1.2 m/s)
2007	Central American Junior; Championships (U20)	San Salvador, El Salvador	1st	4 × 400 m relay	3:23.01
2007	South American Championships	São Paulo, Brazil	5th	4 × 100 m relay	40.13 s
2007	South American Championships	São Paulo, Brazil	3rd	4 × 400 m relay	3:09.67 min
2007	South American Junior Championships	São Paulo, Brazil	1st	100 m	10.28 s (wind: +0.0 m/s)
2007	South American Junior Championships	São Paulo, Brazil	2nd (h)	200 m	21.84 (wind: -0.3 m/s)
2007	Pan American Junior Championships	São Paulo, Brazil	—	100 m	DNF
2008	World Junior Championships	Bydgoszcz, Poland	45th	100 m	10.91 s (wind: 0.2 m/s)
2009	South American Championships	Lima, Peru	1st	100 m	10.29 s A (wind: 0.6 m/s)
2009	South American Championships	Lima, Peru	1st	200 m	20.45 s A (wind: 0.0 m/s)
2009	World Championships	Berlin, Germany	2nd	200 m	19.81 AR (-0.3 m/s)
2010	Central American Games	Panama City, Panama	1st	100 m	10.24 s GR (wind: -0.2 m/s)
2010	Central American Games	Panama City, Panama	8th	200 m	47.18 s (wind: 0.1 m/s)
2011	South American Championships	Buenos Aires, Argentina	–	100 m	DQ
2011	World Championships	Daegu, South Korea	–	200 m	DNF (f)
2012	Central American Championships	Managua, Nicaragua	1st	200 m	21.23 (wind: 0.3 m/s)
2012	Olympic Games	London, United Kingdom	–	200 m	DQ (h)
2013	Central American Games	San José, Costa Rica	1st	200 m	20.52 s w (wind: +2.1 m/s)
2013	Central American Games	San José, Costa Rica	—	4 × 100 m relay	DNF
2013	World Championships	Moscow, Russia	7th (sf)	200 m	20.67 s (wind: -0.3 m/s)
2014	South American Games	Santiago, Chile	1st	100 m	10.23 s GR (wind: +1.1 m/s)
2015	World Championships	Beijing, China	4th	200 m	19.87
2016	Olympic Games	Rio de Janeiro, Brazil	7th	200 m	20.23
2017	World Championships	London, United Kingdom	29th (h)	200 m	20.61
2018	South American Games	Cochabamba, Bolivia	1st	100 m	10.01 GR
2018	Central American and Caribbean Games	Barranquilla, Colombia	2nd	200 m	20.17
2019	Pan American Games	Lima, Peru	4th	200 m	20.55
2021	Olympic Games	Tokyo, Japan	23rd (h)	200 m	20.60 (Note: Did not finish in the semifinal)
2022	World Championships	Eugene, United States	44th (h)	200 m	22.08
2023	Central American and Caribbean Games	San Salvador, El Salvador	–	100 m	DQ
2023	Central American and Caribbean Games	San Salvador, El Salvador	3rd	200 m	20.46
2023	South American Championships	São Paulo, Brazil	4th	100 m	10.14
2023	South American Championships	São Paulo, Brazil	1st	200 m	20.30
2023	World Championships	Budapest, Hungary	29th (h)	200 m	20.63
2023	Pan American Games	Santiago, Chile	5th	100 m	10.41
2023	Pan American Games	Santiago, Chile	5th	200 m	21.01

== Notes ==
- ^{nb} His name is frequently written as Alonso Edwards, with his surname being anglicised. However, the name which the athlete himself uses is Alonso Edward without the final "s".

Olympic Games
Preceded by Irving Saladino	Flagbearer for Panama; Rio de Janeiro 2016; Tokyo 2020 (with Atheyna Bylon)	Succeeded by Franklin Archibold; Hillary Heron
