= Elizete da Silva =

Brazilian heptathlete

Personal information
- Born: 2 May 1971; Cambé, Brazil
- Died: 22 September 2017 (aged 46); Londrina, Brazil

Sport
- Sport: Track and field
- Event: Heptathlon

Elizete Gomes da Silva (2 May 1971 – 22 September 2017) was a Brazilian athlete who competed in the heptathlon. She won multiple medals on the regional level. She retired from competition in 2009.

Da Silva, along with her sister and two others, died in a traffic collision near Londrina on 22 September 2017. She was 46 years old.

== Competition record ==
Year	Competition	Venue	Position	Event	Notes
Representing Brazil
1999	South American Championships	Bogotá, Colombia	2nd	Heptathlon	5669 pts
2001	South American Championships	Manaus, Brazil	1st	Heptathlon	5338 pts
2002	Ibero-American Championships	Guatemala City, Guatemala	2nd	Heptathlon	5288 pts
2003	South American Championships	Barquisimeto, Venezuela	2nd	Heptathlon	5334 pts
2005	South American Championships	Cali, Colombia	1st	Heptathlon	5429 pts
2006	Ibero-American Championships	Ponce, Puerto Rico	2nd	Heptathlon	5468 pts
2006	South American Championships	Tunja, Colombia	1st	Heptathlon	5612 pts
2007	South American Championships	São Paulo, Brazil	2nd	Heptathlon	5727 pts
2007	Pan American Games	Rio de Janeiro, Brazil	6th	Heptathlon	5564 pts
2008	Ibero-American Championships	Iquique, Chile	–	Heptathlon	DNF

== Personal bests ==
- 200 metres – 24.69 (-0.6 m/s) (Rio de Janeiro 2007)
- 800 metres – 2:17.22 (Rio de Janeiro 2000)
- 100 metres hurdles – 14.35 (+0.3 m/s) (Rio de Janeiro 2007)
- High jump – 1.74 (Rio de Janeiro 2001)
- Long jump – 6.06 (+1.3 (São Caetano do Sul 2001)
- Shot put – 12.98 (Rio de Janeiro 2007)
- Javelin throw – 44.76 (Tunja 2006)
- Heptathlon – 5766 (São Paulo 2007)
