= Thaimara Rivas =

Venezuelan heptathlete (born 1982)

Personal information
- Full name: Thaimara Solsiree Rivas Barrios
- Born: July 23, 1982 (age 43)
- Height: 1.71 m (5 ft 7 in)
- Weight: 58 kg (128 lb)

Sport
- Country: Venezuela
- Sport: Athletics
Medal record
Women's Athletics
Representing Venezuela
Bolivarian Games
Gold medal – first place	2005 Armenia	Heptathlon
Gold medal – first place	2009 Sucre	Heptathlon
Silver medal – second place	2001 Ambato	Heptathlon
Silver medal – second place	2009 Sucre	Javelin throw
- Updated on 17 June 2013

Thaimara Solsiree Rivas Barrios (born July 23, 1982) is a female heptathlete from Venezuela. She set her best score (5622 points) on June 21, 2003 at the South American Championships in Barquisimeto.

== Personal bests ==
- Heptathlon: 5622 pts – (Venezuela) Barquisimeto, 21 June 2003

== Achievements ==
Year	Competition	Venue	Position	Event	Notes
Representing Venezuela
2000	Central American and Caribbean Junior Championships (U-20)	San Juan, Puerto Rico	5th	Heptathlon	4522 pts
2000	South American Junior Championships	São Leopoldo, Brazil	4th	Heptathlon	4550 pts
2001	South American Junior Championships	Santa Fe, Argentina	8th	Javelin	33.41 m
2001	South American Junior Championships	Santa Fe, Argentina	3rd	Heptathlon	4832 pts
2001	Pan American Junior Championships	Santa Fe, Argentina	3rd	Heptathlon	4832 pts
2001	Bolivarian Games	Ambato, Ecuador	2nd	Heptathlon	5025 pts A
2003	South American Championships	Barquisimeto, Venezuela	1st	Heptathlon	5622 pts (NR)
2003	Central American and Caribbean Championships	St. George's, Grenada	5th	100 m H	14.57 s
2003	Central American and Caribbean Championships	St. George's, Grenada	14th	Long jump	5.57 m
2003	Central American and Caribbean Championships	St. George's, Grenada	6th	Javelin	40.72 m
2003	Pan American Games	Santo Domingo, Dominican Republic	6th	Heptathlon	5472 pts
2004	South American U23 Championships	Barquisimeto, Venezuela	1st	Heptathlon	5537 pts
2004	Ibero-American Championships	Huelva, Spain	2nd	Heptathlon	5529 pts
2005	Bolivarian Games	Armenia, Colombia	1st	Heptathlon	5461 pts GR A
2006	Central American and Caribbean Games	Cartagena, Colombia	4th	Heptathlon	5411 pts
2007	ALBA Games	Caracas, Venezuela	3rd	Heptathlon	5024 pts
2008	Pan American Combined Events Championships	Santo Domingo, Dominican Republic	5th	Heptathlon	5554 pts
2008	Central American and Caribbean Championships	Cali, Colombia	3rd	Heptathlon	5302 pts
2009	Bolivarian Games	Sucre, Bolivia	2nd	Javelin	41.40 m A
2009	Bolivarian Games	Sucre, Bolivia	1st	Heptathlon	5142 pts A
2010	Ibero-American Championships	San Fernando, Spain	7th	Heptathlon	4631 pts
2011	ALBA Games	Barquisimeto, Venezuela	3rd	Heptahtlon	5273 pts
2011	Pan American Games	Guadalajara, Mexico	–	Heptathlon	DNF
2012	Ibero-American Championships	Barquisimeto, Venezuela	2nd	Heptathlon	5622 pts (=NR)
