= Vanessa Chefer Spínola =

Brazilian heptathlete (born 1990)

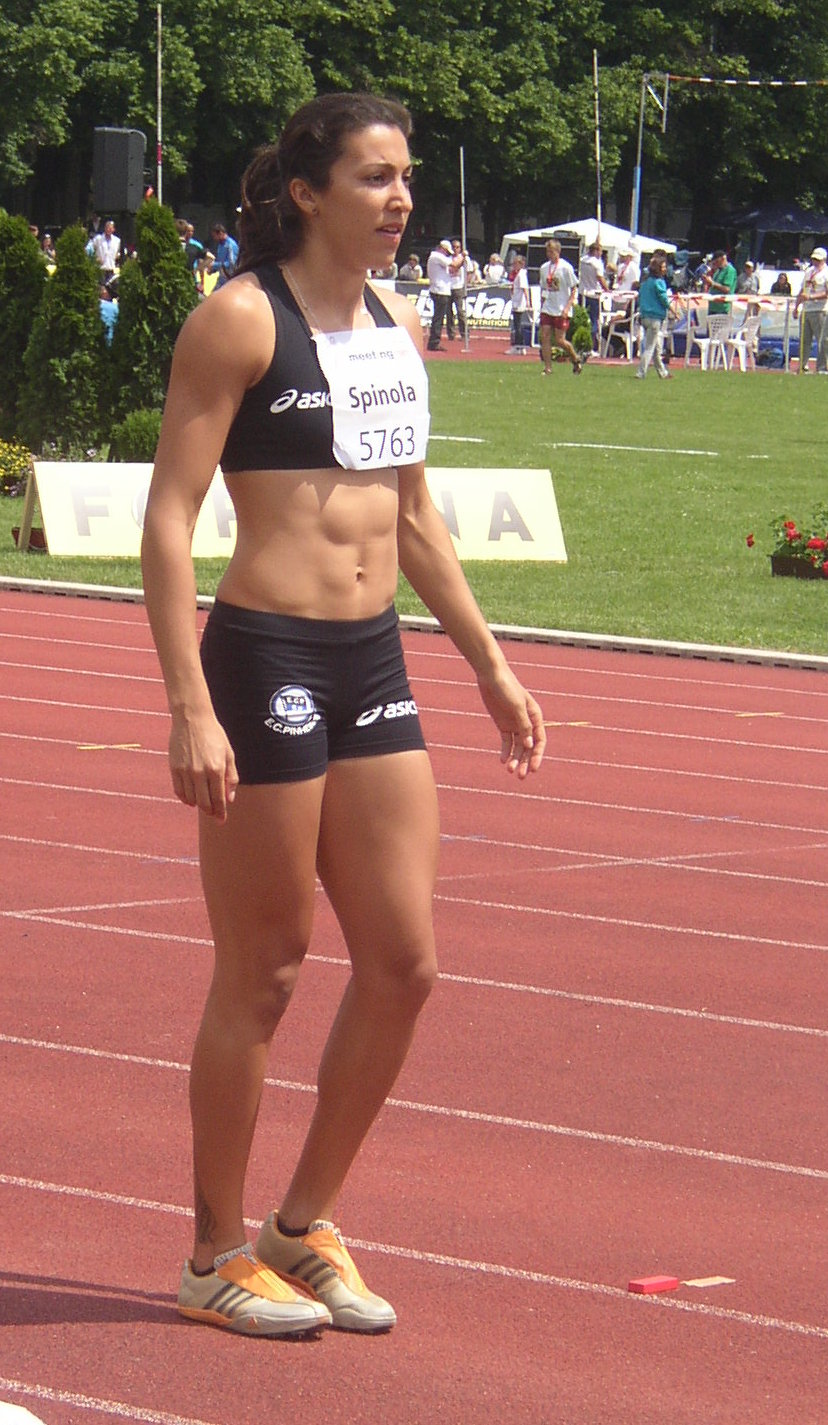
- Spínola in 2010

Personal information
- Full name: Vanessa Chefer Spinola
- Born: 5 March 1990 (age 36) São Paulo, Brazil
- Education: Santa Anna University Centre
- Height: 1.78 m (5 ft 10 in)
- Weight: 68 kg (150 lb)

Sport
- Country: Brazil
- Sport: Athletics
- Event: Heptathlon
- Updated on 5 February 2015

Vanessa Chefer Spínola (born 5 March 1990) is a Brazilian heptathlete.

She finished 21st at the 2007 World Youth Championships and 16th at the 2008 World Junior Championships. She then won the 2009 South American Championships and finished fourth at the 2010 Ibero-American Championships. At the 2010 South American Games she did not finish the competition.

== Personal bests ==
Her personal best score is 6188 points, achieved in July 2016 in São Bernardo do Campo.

Event	Result	Venue	Date
Outdoor
100 m	11.95 s (wind: +1.0 m/s)	São Paulo, Brazil	25 Jul 2009
200 m	23.91 s (wind: +0.2 m/s)	Maringá, Brazil	8 Sep 2012
400 m	57.57 s	São Paulo, Brazil	10 Mar 2011
800 m	2:12.52 min	Arona, Spain	7 Jun 2015
100 m hurdles	14.03 s (wind: -1.7 m/s)	Toronto, Canada	24 Jul 2015
High jump	1.81 m	São Bernardo do Campo, Brazil	30 Jun 2016
Long jump	6.17 m (wind: +1.1 m/s)	Port of Spain, Trinidad and Tobago	2 Aug 2009
Shot put	14.32 m	Toronto, Canada	24 Jul 2015
Javelin throw	46.31 m	Florence, Italy	30 Apr 2016
Heptathlon	6188 pts	São Bernardo do Campo, Brazil	1 Jul 2016
Indoor
800 m	2:16.82 min	Tallinn, Estonia	2 Feb 2013
60 m hurdles	8.81 s	Tallinn, Estonia	4 Feb 2016
High jump	1.76 m	Bratislava, Slovakia	15 Feb 2014
Long jump	6.04 m	Tallinn, Estonia	2 Feb 2013
Shot put	13.62 m	Tallinn, Estonia	14 Feb 2016
Pentathlon	4292 pts	Tallinn, Estonia	14 Feb 2016

== Competition record ==
Year	Competition	Venue	Position	Event	Notes
Representing Brazil
2007	South American Junior Championships	São Paulo, Brazil	1st	Long jump	5.79 m
2007	World Youth Championships	Ostrava, Czech Republic	21st	Heptathlon	4575 pts
2008	World Junior Championships	Bydgoszcz, Poland	16th	Heptathlon	5233 pts
2008	South American U23 Championships	Lima, Peru	1st	Heptathlon	5138 pts
2009	South American Junior Championships	São Paulo, Brazil	4th	100 m	11.95 s
2009	South American Junior Championships	São Paulo, Brazil	1st	4 × 100 m	45.86 s
2009	South American Junior Championships	São Paulo, Brazil	1st	Heptathlon	5574 pts
2009	Pan American Junior Championships	Port of Spain, Trinidad and Tobago	1st	Heptathlon	5574 pts
2009	South American Championships	Lima, Peru	1st	Heptathlon	5578 pts
2010	South American Games / South American U23 Championships	Medellín, Colombia	–	Heptathlon	DNF
2010	Ibero-American Championships	San Fernando, Spain	4th	Heptathlon	5304 pts
2011	South American Championships	Buenos Aires, Argentina	1st	Heptathlon	5428 pts
2012	South American U23 Championships	São Paulo, Brazil	1st	Heptathlon	5899 pts
2014	Ibero-American Championships	São Paulo, Brazil	1st	Heptathlon	5722 pts
2015	Pan American Games	Toronto, Canada	3rd	Heptathlon	6035 pts
2015	World Championships	Beijing, China	26th	Heptathlon	5647 pts
2016	Olympic Games	Rio de Janeiro, Brazil	23rd	Heptathlon	6024 pts
2017	World Championships	London, United Kingdom	29th	Heptathlon	4500 pts
2017	Universiade	Taipei, Taiwan	5th	Heptathlon	5337 pts
2019	South American Championships	Lima, Peru	2nd	Heptathlon	5823 pts
2019	Pan American Games	Lima, Peru	5th	Heptathlon	5868 pts
