= 2013 Pan American Combined Events Cup =

- Organisers: APA
- Edition: 8th
- Date: June 1–2
- Host city: Ottawa, Ontario, Canada
- Venue: Terry Fox Stadium
- Participation: 12 nations

The 2013 Pan American Combined Events Cup was held in Ottawa, Ontario, Canada, at the Terry Fox Stadium on June 1–2, 2013. The event was held jointly with the Athletics Ontario Senior Combined Events Championships and the Québec Canada Games Trials. A detailed report on the event and an appraisal of the results was given.

Complete results were published.

== Medallists ==
Event	Gold		Silver		Bronze	
Men's Decathlon	Yordanis García; Cuba	8141	José Ángel Mendieta; Cuba	7766	Gray Horn; United States	7581
Women's Heptathlon	Yorgelis Rodríguez; Cuba	5947	Ana Camila Pirelli; Paraguay	5683	Lindsay Schwartz; United States	5645

== Results ==
=== Men's Decathlon ===
Key

The highest mark recorded in each event is highlighted in yellow

Rank	Athlete	Overall points	100 m	LJ	SP	HJ	400 m	110 m H	DT	PV	JT	1500 m
1st place, gold medalist(s)	Yordanis García; Cuba	8141	912; 10.77 s w:+1.3	881; 7.28 m w:+3.0	761; 14.54 m	831; 2.03 m	839; 49.47 s	948; 14.21 s w:+0.6	701; 41.78 m	849; 4.80 m	730; 59.47 m	689; 4:38.67 min
2nd place, silver medalist(s)	José Ángel Mendieta; Cuba	7766	865; 10.98 s w:+1.3	878; 7.27 m w:+3.6	787; 14.95 m	696; 1.88 m	826; 49.75 s	922; 14.41 s w:+0.6	682; 40.84 m	731; 4.40 m	741; 60.22 m	638; 4:46.86 min
3rd place, bronze medalist(s)	Gray Horn; United States	7581	876; 10.93 s w:+1.3	898; 7.35 m w:+1.9	693; 13.43 m	831; 2.03 m	810; 50.11 s	954; 14.16 s w:+0.6	633; 38.44 m	760; 4.50 m	511; 44.76 m	615; 4:50.55 min
4	Manuel Alejandro González; Cuba	7457	795; 11.30 s w:+1.3	874; 7.25 m w:+4.6	693; 13.43 m	749; 1.94 m	732; 51.84 s	868; 14.85 s w:+0.5	562; 34.90 m	790; 4.60 m	694; 57.09 m	700; 4:36.89 min
5	Tim Wunderlich; United States	7201	725; 11.63 s w:+1.3	757; 6.76 m w:+2.9	733; 14.08 m	670; 1.85 m	676; 53.14 s	794; 15.47 s w:+0.5	722; 42.81 m	819; 4.70 m	714; 58.41 m	591; 4:54.68 min
6	Corbin Duer; United States	7200	746; 11.53 s w:+0.4	746; 6.71 m w:+3.0	640; 12.56 m	803; 2.00 m	766; 51.07 s	810; 15.33 s w:+0.5	668; 40.15 m	819; 4.70 m	587; 49.92 m	615; 4:50.58 min
7	Pat Arbour; Canada	7183	750; 11.51 s w:+1.3	778; 6.85 m w:+2.3	766; 14.61 m	696; 1.88 m	656; 53.60 s	823; 15.22 s w:+0.5	796; 46.42 m	731; 4.40 m	698; 57.37 m	489; 5:12.69 min
8	Josué Louis; Haiti	6939	830; 11.14 s w:+1.3	776; 6.84 m w:+3.0	634; 12.45 m	859; 2.06 m	776; 50.84 s	900; 14.59 s w:+0.6	574; 35.51 m	645; 4.10 m	635; 53.12 m	310; 5:49.20 min
—	Jake Waruch (United States) /Connecticut	6887	808; 11.24 s w:+1.3	711; 6.56 m w:+2.2	689; 13.36 m	749; 1.94 m	774; 50.90 s	760; 15.76 s w:+0.5	608; 37.20 m	562; 3.80 m	631; 52.88 m	595; 4:54.03 min
—	Ethan Turpen (United States) /Arkansas	6818	791; 11.32 s w:+1.3	769; 6.81 m w:+1.6	595; 11.82 m	696; 1.88 m	762; 51.15 s	859; 14.92 s w:+0.6	573; 35.46 m	617; 4.00 m	490; 43.26 m	666; 4:42.26 min
9	Juan de la Cruz; Dominican Republic	6615	793; 11.31 s w:+0.4	704; 6.53 m w:+1.8	620; 12.22 m	696; 1.88 m	708; 52.38 s	755; 15.80 s w:+0.8	519; 32.76 m	645; 4.10 m	555; 47.70 m	620; 4:49.76 min
—	Kerinde Silva^{†} Brazil	6607	863; 10.99 s w:+0.4	764; 6.79 m w:+2.9	628; 12.36 m^{†}	749; 1.94 m	804; 50.24 s	785; 15.54 s w:+0.5^{†}	525; 33.05 m^{†}	509; 3.60 m	414; 38.05 m^{†}	566; 4:58.98 min
10	Matias Dallaserra; Chile	6576	793; 11.31 s w:+1.3	693; 6.48 m w:+2.2	655; 12.80 m	670; 1.85 m	726; 51.97 s	737; 15.96 s w:+0.7	534; 33.53 m	590; 3.90 m	468; 41.78 m	710; 4:35.30 min
—	Ben Waruch (United States) /Connecticut	6450	810; 11.23 s w:+1.3	619; 6.15 m w:+2.6	684; 13.27 m	696; 1.88 m	642; 53.95 s	774; 15.64 s w:+0.6	523; 32.98 m	731; 4.40 m	514; 44.94 m	457; 5:18.64 min
—	Jesse Drennan (Canada) /Nova Scotia	6077	750; 11.51 s w:+0.4	760; 6.77 m w:+1.9	711; 13.71 m	670; 1.85 m	734; 51.80 s	705; 16.25 s w:+0.8	583; 35.96 m	0 NM	543; 46.90 m	621; 4:49.69 min
—	Dylan Golow (Canada) /Ontario	6009	641; 12.05 s w:+0.3	655; 6.31 m w:+0.4	574; 11.46 m	619; 1.79 m	602; 54.91 s	674; 16.53 s w:+0.7	540; 33.80 m	562; 3.80 m	517; 45.16 m	625; 4:48.91 min
—	Samuel Smith (United States) /Connecticut	5868	691; 11.80 s w:+1.3	582; 5.98 m w:+1.0	606; 12.00 m	723; 1.91 m	558; 56.04 s	688; 16.40 s w:+0.8	541; 33.84 m	457; 3.40 m	582; 49.55 m	440; 5:21.87 min
—	Keegan Sharp (Canada) /Saskatchewan	5740	713; 11.69 s w:+0.3	711; 6.56 m w:+0.9	638; 12.52 m	569; 1.73 m	757; 51.27 s	730; 16.02 s w:+0.8	532; 33.42 m	590; 3.90 m	500; 43.97 m	0 DNS
—	Chris Robertson (Canada) /New Brunswick	5399	685; 11.83 s w:+1.3	700; 6.51 m w:+2.9	534; 10.80 m	593; 1.76 m	658; 53.56 s	658; 16.68 s w:+0.8	628; 38.22 m	0 NM	528; 45.87 m	415; 5:26.84 min
—	Peter Nsaka^{†} (Canada) /Quebec	5387	633; 12.09 s w:+0.3	569; 5.92 m w:+2.8	558; 34.74 m^{†}	723; 1.91 m	618; 54.53 s	412; 19.24 s w:+0.5^{†}	558; 34.74 m^{†}	286; 2.70 m	409; 37.73 m^{†}	696; 4:37.46 min
DNF	Marcos Sánchez-Valle; Puerto Rico	5167	810; 11.23 s w:+0.4	785; 6.88 m w:+3.6	670; 13.05 m	803; 2.00 m	776; 50.85 s	648; 16.77 s w:+0.5	675; 40.50 m	0 NM	0 DNS	DNS
—	Axel Mbongo (Canada) /Quebec	5157	655; 11.98 s w:+0.3	646; 6.27 m w:+2.0	522; 10.61 m	619; 1.79 m	634; 54.14 s	614; 17.10 s w:+0.7	0 NM	482; 3.50 m	514; 44.94 m	471; 5:16.05 min
—	Matthew Johnson (Canada) /Ontario	4922	635; 12.08 s w:+0.3	648; 6.28 m w:+1.7	468; 9.70 m	619; 1.79 m	563; 55.90 s	551; 17.72 s w:+0.7	356; 24.42 m	0 NM	454; 40.79 m	628; 4:48.52 min
—	Kevin Nault (Canada) /Ontario	4897	780; 11.37 s w:+0.4	494; 5.56 m w:+1.2	483; 9.96 m	569; 1.73 m	521; 56.99 s	650; 16.76 s w:+0.8	433; 28.38 m	286; 2.70 m	341; 32.92 m	340; 5:42.55 min
—	Mark Chenery (Canada) /Ontario	3905	791; 11.32 s w:+0.3	0 NM	603; 11.94 m	0 NM	804; 50.22 s	775; 15.63 s w:+0.7	556; 34.60 m	0 NM	376; 35.43 m	0 DNS
—	Zachary Jauniaux (Canada) /Quebec	3567	687; 11.82 s w:+0.3	544; 5.80 m w:+1.6	414; 8.81 m	593; 1.76 m	652; 53.71 s	381; 19.61 s w:+0.7	296; 21.29 m	0 NM	0 DNS	DNS
—	Vincent Lanctôt-Reeves (Canada) /Quebec	289	289; 14.17 s w:+0.4	0 DNS	DNS							
—	Branden Wilhelm (Canada) /Ontario		0; 17.99 s w:+1.3	0 DNS	DNS							

^{†}: Junior athlete using junior implements.

=== Women's Heptathlon ===
Key

The highest mark recorded in each event is highlighted in yellow

Rank	Athlete	Overall points	100 m H	HJ	SP	200 m	LJ	JT	800 m
1st place, gold medalist(s)	Yorgelis Rodríguez; Cuba	5947	1024; 13.68 s w:+1.0	1016; 1.83 m	739; 13.17 m	953; 24.29 s w:+1.2	747; 5.66 m w:+2.2	669; 40.10 m	799; 2:21.85 min
2nd place, silver medalist(s)	Ana Camila Pirelli; Paraguay	5683	961; 14.12 s w:+1.0	830; 1.68 m	732; 13.07 m	891; 24.95 s w:+0.7	744; 5.65 m w:+3.1	691; 41.22 m	834; 2:19.26 min
3rd place, bronze medalist(s)	Lindsay Schwartz; United States	5645	987; 13.94 s w:+1.0	867; 1.71 m	653; 11.88 m	920; 24.64 s w:+1.2	677; 5.42 m w:+1.5	679; 40.60 m	862; 2:17.17 min
4	Yusleidys Mendieta; Cuba	5560	994; 13.89 s w:+2.1	903; 1.74 m	720; 12.89 m	967; 24.14 s w:+1.2	612; 5.19 m w:+1.2	708; 42.14 m	656; 2:32.98 min
5	Breanna Leslie; United States	5552	964; 14.10 s w:+1.0	867; 1.71 m	610; 11.22 m	938; 24.45 s w:+1.2	614; 5.20 m w:+3.2	662; 39.71 m	897; 2:14.72 min
6	Jennifer Cotten; Canada	5379	998; 13.86 s w:+1.0	795; 1.65 m	575; 10.69 m	890; 24.96 s w:+1.2	801; 5.84 m w:+2.6	443; 28.24 m	877; 2:16.12 min
7	Rachael McIntosh; Canada	5307	902; 14.55 s w:+2.1	795; 1.65 m	673; 12.18 m	835; 25.57 s w:+0.7	631; 5.26 m w:+1.5	578; 35.31 m	893; 2:14.99 min
8	Aisha Adams (athlete); United States	5296	966; 14.09 s w:+1.0	830; 1.68 m	608; 11.19 m	912; 24.73 s w:+1.2	540; 4.93 m w:+0.8	660; 39.63 m	780; 2:23.27 min
9	Rachel Machin; Canada	5285	968; 14.07 s w:+2.1	1054; 1.86 m	500; 9.55 m	785; 26.14 s w:+1.0	765; 5.72 m w:+2.1	482; 30.29 m	731; 2:26.98 min
10	Milagros Montes de Oca; Dominican Republic	5273	932; 14.33 s w:+1.0	795; 1.65 m	612; 11.26 m	804; 25.92 s w:+0.9	640; 5.29 m w:+2.5	633; 38.19 m	857; 2:17.57 min
11	Ana Jazmin Irrizary; Dominican Republic	5170	953; 14.18 s w:+1.0	655; 1.53 m	674; 12.19 m	852; 25.38 s w:+0.7	720; 5.57 m w:NWI	667; 40.00 m	649; 2:33.53 min
12	Alysbeth Felix; Puerto Rico	5037	920; 14.42 s w:+2.1	867; 1.71 m	411; 8.18 m	875; 25.13 s w:+0.7	759; 5.70 m w:+1.1	502; 31.36 m	703; 2:29.19 min
—	Pascale Délisle (Canada) /Quebec	4787	860; 14.86 s w:+1.0	689; 1.56 m	631; 11.54 m	875; 25.13 s w:+0.7	631; 5.26 m w:+0.7	348; 23.16 m	753; 2:25.31 min
13	Ana María Porras; Costa Rica	4751	886; 14.67 s w:+1.0	830; 1.68 m	572; 10.65 m	761; 26.42 s w:+1.0	686; 5.45 m w:+3.4	323; 21.83 m	693; 2:29.98 min
—	Michele Krech (Canada) /Ontario	4722	796; 15.35 s w:+1.0	655; 1.53 m	569; 10.61 m	734; 26.74 s w:+0.9	643; 5.30 m w:+1.7	471; 29.73 m	854; 2:17.78 min
—	Geneviève Gagné (Canada) /Quebec	4647	768; 15.57 s w:+1.9	724; 1.59 m	522; 9.89 m	724; 26.86 s w:+1.0	674; 5.41 m w:+2.3	561; 34.44 m	674; 2:31.52 min
—	Allison Frantz^{†} (Canada) /Quebec	4450	883; 14.69 s w:+1.8^{†}	867; 1.71 m	520; 9.85 m^{†}	774; 26.27 s w:+1.0	466; 4.65 m w:+3.0	306; 20.91 m^{†}	634; 2:34.77 min
—	Alexandra Morrow^{†} (Canada) /Ontario	4405	856; 14.89 s w:+1.8^{†}	621; 1.50 m	524; 9.92 m^{†}	736; 26.71 s w:+1.0	562; 5.01 m w:+4.1	464; 29.35 m^{†}	642; 2:34.14 min
—	Maude Croteau-Vaillancourt (Canada) /Quebec	4325	802; 15.30 s w:+1.9	759; 1.62 m	412; 8.19 m	712; 27.00 s w:+0.9	567; 5.03 m w:+2.1	495; 30.95 m	578; 2:39.59 min
—	Kelly Morrison (Canada) /Ontario	4317	756; 15.66 s w:+1.9	724; 1.59 m	520; 9.85 m	706; 27.07 s w:+0.4	601; 5.15 m w:+2.0	384; 25.09 m	626; 2:35.49 min
—	Lauren Taylor (Canada) /Saskatchewan	4284	717; 15.98 s w:+1.8	795; 1.65 m	583; 10.81 m	636; 27.94 s w:+0.4	477; 4.69 m w:+1.2	492; 30.79 m	584; 2:39.02 min
—	Julianne Dorothal^{†} Aruba	4208	734; 15.84 s w:+1.8^{†}	655; 1.53 m	640; 11.68 m^{†}	604; 28.34 s w:+0.4	498; 4.77 m w:+3.6	513; 31.94 m^{†}	564; 2:40.75 min
DNF	Katy Louise Sealy; Belize	3573	722; 15.94 s w:+1.9	795; 1.65 m	495; 9.48 m	617; 28.17 s w:+0.4	508; 4.81 m w:+1.8	436; 27.84 m	0 DNS
DNF	Karen Lopes; Brazil	3557	932; 14.33 s w:+2.1	555; 1.44 m	617; 11.33 m	866; 25.23 s w:+0.7	587; 5.10 m w:+0.6	0 DNS	DNS
—	Marie-Hélène Lavallée-Bourget (Canada) /Quebec	3491	616; 16.83 s w:+1.8	460; 1.35 m	445; 8.71 m	581; 28.65 s w:+0.4	396; 4.37 m w:+1.6	335; 22.47 m	658; 2:32.82 min
—	Sonia Chartrand (Canada) /Quebec	3460	592; 17.04 s w:+1.9	555; 1.44 m	579; 10.75 m	542; 29.17 s w:+0.4	495; 4.76 m w:+0.3	697; 41.57 m	0 DNF
—	Maude Leveille (Canada) /Quebec	3291	0 DQ	655; 1.53 m	469; 9.08 m	731; 26.77 s w:+0.9	503; 4.79 m w:+4.3	381; 24.92 m	552; 2:41.82 min
—	Tamara Cap (Canada) /Quebec	2856	832; 15.07 s w:+2.1	759; 1.62 m	575; 10.69 m	690; 27.27 s w:+0.9	0 NM	0 DNS	DNS
DNF	Carolina Castillo; Chile	2231	918; 14.43 s w:+1.0	795; 1.65 m	518; 9.83 m	DNS			
—	Tory Merrill (Canada) /Ontario	906	906; 14.52 s w:+1.0	0 NM	0 DNS	DNS			

^{†}: Junior athlete using junior implements.

== Participation ==
An unofficial count yields the participation of 27 athletes from 11 countries in the senior events. In addition, there were 26 local athletes (22 from Canada and 4 from the United States), and 5 junior athletes (including 1 from Aruba, 1 from Brazil, and 3 locals from Canada) integrated into the competition.

- Belize (1)
- Brazil (1)
- Canada (4)
- Chile (2)
- Costa Rica (1)
- Cuba (5)
- Dominican Republic (3)
- Haiti (1)
- Paraguay (1)
- Puerto Rico (2)
- United States (6)

== See also ==
- 2013 in athletics (track and field)
