= Athletics at the 2019 Pan American Games – Women's heptathlon =

Women's heptathlon at the 2019 Pan American Games
- Venue: Athletics Stadium
- Dates: August 7 – August 8
- Competitors: 9 from 7 nations
- Winning points: 6113

Medalists
Gold medal	Adriana Rodríguez	Cuba
Silver medal	Annie Kunz	United States
Bronze medal	Martha Araújo	Colombia

The women's heptathlon competition of the athletics events at the 2019 Pan American Games took place between the 7th and 8th of August at the 2019 Pan American Games Athletics Stadium. The defending Pan American Games champion was Yorgelis Rodríguez from Cuba.

== Records ==
Prior to this competition, the existing world and Pan American Games records were as follows:

World record	Jackie Joyner-Kersee (USA)	7291	Seoul, South Korea	September 24, 1988
Pan American Games record	Yorgelis Rodríguez (CUB)	6332	Toronto, Canada	July 25, 2015

== Schedule ==
Date	Time	Round
August 7, 2019	14:40	100 metres hurdles
August 7, 2019	15:15	High jump
August 7, 2019	18:00	Shot put
August 7, 2019	19:20	200 metres
August 8, 2019	16:30	Long jump
August 8, 2019	17:50	Javelin throw
August 8, 2019	19:05	800 metres
August 8, 2019	19:05	Final standings

== Results ==
All times shown are in seconds.

KEY:	PR	Pan Am record	NR	National record	PB	Personal best	SB	Seasonal best	DB	Decathlon best

=== 100 m hurdles ===
Wind: +0.2 m/s

Rank	Heat	Name	Nationality	Time	Points	Notes
1	1	Adriana Rodríguez	Cuba	13.37	1069	SB
2	2	Ana Camila Pirelli	Paraguay	13.54	1044	SB
3	1	Annie Kunz	United States	13.55	1043	
4	1	Tyra Gittens	Trinidad and Tobago	13.63	1031	
5	2	Martha Araújo	Colombia	13.72	1018	PB
6	1	Riley Schultz-Cooks	United States	13.77	1011	
7	2	Alysbeth Félix	Puerto Rico	13.85	1000	SB
8	2	Vanessa Chefer Spínola	Brazil	14.13	960	SB
9	1	Yorgelis Rodríguez	Cuba	14.24	945	
	2	Luisarys Toledo	Venezuela			DNS

=== High jump ===
Rank	Name	Nationality	1.50	1.53	1.56	1.59	1.62	1.65	1.68	1.71	1.74	1.77	1.80	1.83	1.86	Mark	Points	Notes	Total
1	Tyra Gittens	Trinidad and Tobago	–	–	–	–	–	o	o	o	o	o	xxo	xxo	xxx	1.83	1016		2047
2	Alysbeth Félix	Puerto Rico	–	–	–	–	o	o	o	xo	xo	xo	xxx			1.77	941	SB	1941
3	Adriana Rodríguez	Cuba	–	–	–	–	–	o	o	xo	xxo	xo	xxx			1.77	941		2010
4	Annie Kunz	United States	–	–	–	o	o	o	o	o	xxx					1.74	903		1946
5	Vanessa Chefer Spínola	Brazil	–	o	o	o	o	o	xo	xo	xxx					1.71	867	SB	1827
6	Martha Araújo	Colombia	o	–	o	o	o	o	xxo	xo	xxx					1.71	867	PB	1885
7	Ana Camila Pirelli	Paraguay	o	o	xo	o	o	xxx								1.62	759		1803
8	Riley Schultz-Cooks	United States	–	–	o	o	xxx									1.59	724		1735
	Yorgelis Rodríguez	Cuba	–	–	–	–	–	xxx								NM	0		945
	Luisarys Toledo	Venezuela																DNS	DNF

=== Shot put ===
Rank	Name	Nationality	#1	#2	#3	Mark	Points	Notes	Total
1	Ana Camila Pirelli	Paraguay	13.92	13.56	13.44	13.92	789	SB	2592
2	Tyra Gittens	Trinidad and Tobago	12.18	12.16	13.43	13.43	756		2803
3	Adriana Rodríguez	Cuba	12.10	13.21	11.40	13.21	741	SB	2751
4	Annie Kunz	United States	13.06	13.02	12.55	13.06	731		2677
5	Riley Schultz-Cooks	United States	x	11.91	12.97	12.97	725		2460
6	Vanessa Chefer Spínola	Brazil	11.88	12.08	12.19	12.19	674		2501
7	Martha Araújo	Colombia	11.26	11.93	11.97	11.97	659	SB	2544
8	Alysbeth Félix	Puerto Rico	11.02	11.20	10.80	11.20	608	SB	2549
	Yorgelis Rodríguez	Cuba						DNS	DNF
	Luisarys Toledo	Venezuela						DNS	DNF

=== 200 m ===
Wind: +1.0 m/s

Rank	Name	Nationality	Time	Points	Notes	Total
1	Adriana Rodríguez	Cuba	24.02	979	SB	3730
2	Tyra Gittens	Trinidad and Tobago	24.19	963		3766
3	Annie Kunz	United States	24.47	936		3613
4	Riley Schultz-Cooks	United States	24.76	909		3369
5	Ana Camila Pirelli	Paraguay	24.82	903	SB	3495
6	Alysbeth Félix	Puerto Rico	24.86	900		3449
7	Vanessa Chefer Spínola	Brazil	24.91	895		3396
8	Martha Araújo	Colombia	25.15	873	SB	3417

=== Long jump ===
Rank	Name	Nationality	#1	#2	#3	Mark	Points	Notes	Total
1	Adriana Rodríguez	Cuba	x	x	6.46	6.46	994	SB	4724
2	Alysbeth Félix	Puerto Rico	6.27	x	6.21	6.27	934		4383
3	Annie Kunz	United States	x	x	6.11	6.11	883		4496
4	Martha Araújo	Colombia	5.78	5.99	x	5.99	846	SB	4263
5	Vanessa Chefer Spínola	Brazil	5.97	5.87	5.87	5.97	840		4236
6	Riley Schultz-Cooks	United States	x	x	5.74	5.74	771		4140
7	Ana Camila Pirelli	Paraguay	5.41	5.47	5.44	5.47	691	SB	4186
8	Tyra Gittens	Trinidad and Tobago	x	4.40	5.44	5.44	683		4449

=== Javelin throw ===
Rank	Name	Nationality	#1	#2	#3	Mark	Points	Notes	Total
1	Ana Camila Pirelli	Paraguay	45.91	48.56	47.44	48.56	832	SB	5018
2	Martha Araújo	Colombia	45.05	47.54	47.70	47.70	816		5079
3	Vanessa Chefer Spínola	Brazil	41.14	42.11	45.00	45.00	763	SB	4999
4	Annie Kunz	United States	39.95	38.01	37.30	39.95	666	SB	5162
5	Riley Schultz-Cooks	United States	39.01	38.64	39.89	39.89	665		4805
6	Alysbeth Félix	Puerto Rico	34.48	x	32.86	34.48	562		4945
7	Adriana Rodríguez	Cuba	30.16	31.53	33.59	33.59	545		5269
8	Tyra Gittens	Trinidad and Tobago	29.09	x	32.41	32.41	522		4971

=== 800 m ===
Rank	Name	Nationality	Time	Points	Notes	Total
1	Ana Camila Pirelli	Paraguay	2:15.29	889		5907
2	Alysbeth Félix	Puerto Rico	2:16.43	873	SB	5818
3	Vanessa Chefer Spínola	Brazil	2:16.67	869		5868
4	Martha Araújo	Colombia	2:18.33	846	SB	5925
5	Adriana Rodríguez	Cuba	2:18.49	844	SB	6113
6	Annie Kunz	United States	2:19.69	828	SB	5990
7	Riley Schultz-Cooks	United States	2:28.55	711		5516
	Tyra Gittens	Trinidad and Tobago	DNS			DNF

=== Final standings ===
Rank	Athlete	Nationality	Points	Notes
1st place, gold medalist(s)	Adriana Rodríguez	Cuba	6113	
2nd place, silver medalist(s)	Annie Kunz	United States	5990	
3rd place, bronze medalist(s)	Martha Araújo	Colombia	5925	PB
4	Ana Camila Pirelli	Paraguay	5907	NR
5	Vanessa Chefer Spínola	Brazil	5868	
6	Alysbeth Félix	Puerto Rico	5818	SB
7	Riley Schultz-Cooks	United States	5516	
	Tyra Gittens	Trinidad and Tobago	DNF	
	Yorgelis Rodríguez	Cuba	DNF	
	Luisarys Toledo	Venezuela	DNS	
