= Yasmiany Pedroso =

Cuban heptathlete

Personal information
- Born: 5 August 1984 (age 41)

Sport
- Sport: Track and field
- Event: Heptathlon
Medal record
Representing Cuba
Pan American Games
Silver medal – second place	2011 Guadalajara	Heptathlon

Yasmiany Pedroso (born 5 August 1984) is a Cuban athlete competing in the heptathlon. She has won several medals at the regional level.

== Competition record ==
Year	Competition	Venue	Position	Event	Notes
Representing Cuba
2005	Central American and Caribbean Championships	Nassau, Bahamas	2nd	Heptathlon	5479 pts
2006	NACAC U23 Championships	Santo Domingo, Dominican Republic	3rd	Heptathlon	5570 pts
2007	Pan American Games	Rio de Janeiro, Brazil	4th	Heptathlon	5692 pts
2008	Central American and Caribbean Championships	Cali, Colombia	2nd	Heptathlon	5833 pts
2011	Pan American Games	Guadalajara, Mexico	2nd	Heptathlon	5710 pts

== Personal bests ==
- 200 metres – 25.10 (0.0 m/s) (Havana 2012)
- 800 metres – 2:23.44 (Ponce 2007)
- 100 metres hurdles – 13.88 (-0.6 m/s) (Rio de Janeiro 2007)
- High jump – 1.84 (Havana 2006)
- Long jump – 6.13 (+1.2) (Caracas 2007)
- Shot put – 15.61 (Havana 2012)
- Javelin throw – 48.88 (Havana 2012)
- Heptathlon – 5942 (Caracas 2007)
