= Yorgelis Rodríguez =

Cuban athlete

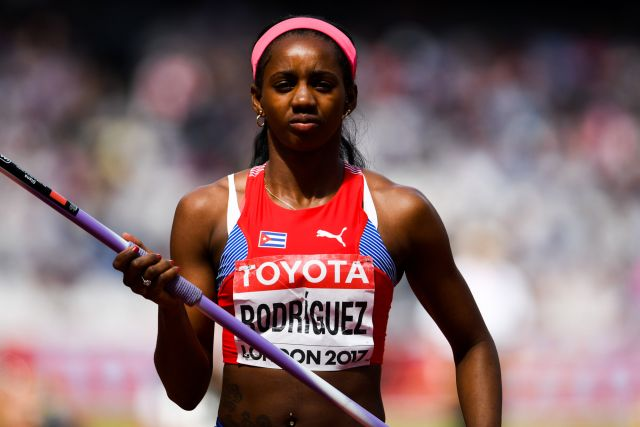
- Rodríguez at the 2017 World Championships in Athletics

Personal information
- Full name: Yorgelis Rodríguez García
- Born: 25 January 1995 (age 31) Guantánamo, Cuba
- Height: 1.73 m (5 ft 8 in)
- Weight: 62 kg (137 lb)

Sport
- Country: Cuba
- Sport: Athletics
- Event: Combined events
Medal record
World Indoor Championships
Bronze medal – third place	2018 Birmingham	Pentathlon
Pan American Games
Gold medal – first place	2015 Toronto	Heptathlon
- Updated on 2 March 2018

Yorgelis Rodríguez García (born 25 January 1995) is a Cuban track and field athlete specialising in the heptathlon. She represented her country at the 2013 World Championships finishing twelfth overall. Earlier she won several medals at the World Junior and Youth Championships, including the gold at the 2012 World Junior Championships.

She was the gold medalist at the 2015 Pan American Games. She competed at the 2020 Summer Olympics.

== Competition record ==
Year	Competition	Venue	Position	Event	Notes
Representing Cuba
2011	World Youth Championships	Lille, France	2nd	Heptathlon (youth)	5671 pts
2012	Pan American Combined Events Cup	Ottawa, Ontario, Canada	1st	Heptathlon	5819 pts
2012	World Junior Championships	Barcelona, Spain	1st	Heptathlon	5966 pts
2013	Pan American Combined Events Cup	Ottawa, Ontario, Canada	1st	Heptathlon	5947 pts
2013	World Championships	Moscow, Russia	12th	Heptathlon	6148 pts
2014	World Junior Championships	Eugene, United States	16th (q)	High jump	1.79 m
2014	World Junior Championships	Eugene, United States	2nd	Heptathlon	6006 pts
2014	Central American and Caribbean Games	Veracruz, Mexico	1st	Heptathlon	5984 pts
2015	Pan American Combined Events Cup	Ottawa, Canada	1st	Heptathlon	6068 pts
2015	Pan American Games	Toronto, Canada	1st	Heptathlon	6332 pts
2015	World Championships	Beijing, China	21st	Heptathlon	5932 pts
2016	Olympic Games	Rio de Janeiro, Brazil	7th	Heptathlon	6452 pts
2017	World Championships	London, United Kingdom	4th	Heptathlon	6594 pts NR
2018	World Indoor Championships	Birmingham, United Kingdom	13th	High jump	1.84 m
2018	World Indoor Championships	Birmingham, United Kingdom	3rd	Pentathlon	4637 pts
2018	Central American and Caribbean Games	Barranquilla, Colombia	1st	Heptathlon	6436 pts
2019	Pan American Games	Lima, Peru	–	Heptathlon	DNF
2021	Olympic Games	Tokyo, Japan	–	Heptathlon	DNF

== Personal bests ==
Outdoor

- 200 metres – 23.96 (-0.6 m/s) (Götzis 2018)
- 800 metres – 2:10.48 (London 2017)
- 100 metres hurdles – 13.48 (+0.3 m/s) (Götzis 2018)
- High jump – 1.95 (London 2017)
- Long jump – 6.50 (+1.4 m/s) (Bilbao 2017)
- Shot put – 14.95 (Götzis 2018)
- Javelin throw – 49.56 (Götzis 2021)
- Heptathlon – 6742 NR (Götzis 2018)

Indoor

- 800 metres – 2:17.70 (Birmingham 2018)
- 60 metres hurdles – 8.57 (Birmingham 2018)
- High jump – 1.88 (Birmingham 2018)
- Long jump – 6.29 (Sabadell 2018)
- Shot put – 14.15 (Birmingham 2018)
- Pentathlon – 4637 NR (Birmingham 2018)
