= Jessica Zelinka =

Canadian athlete

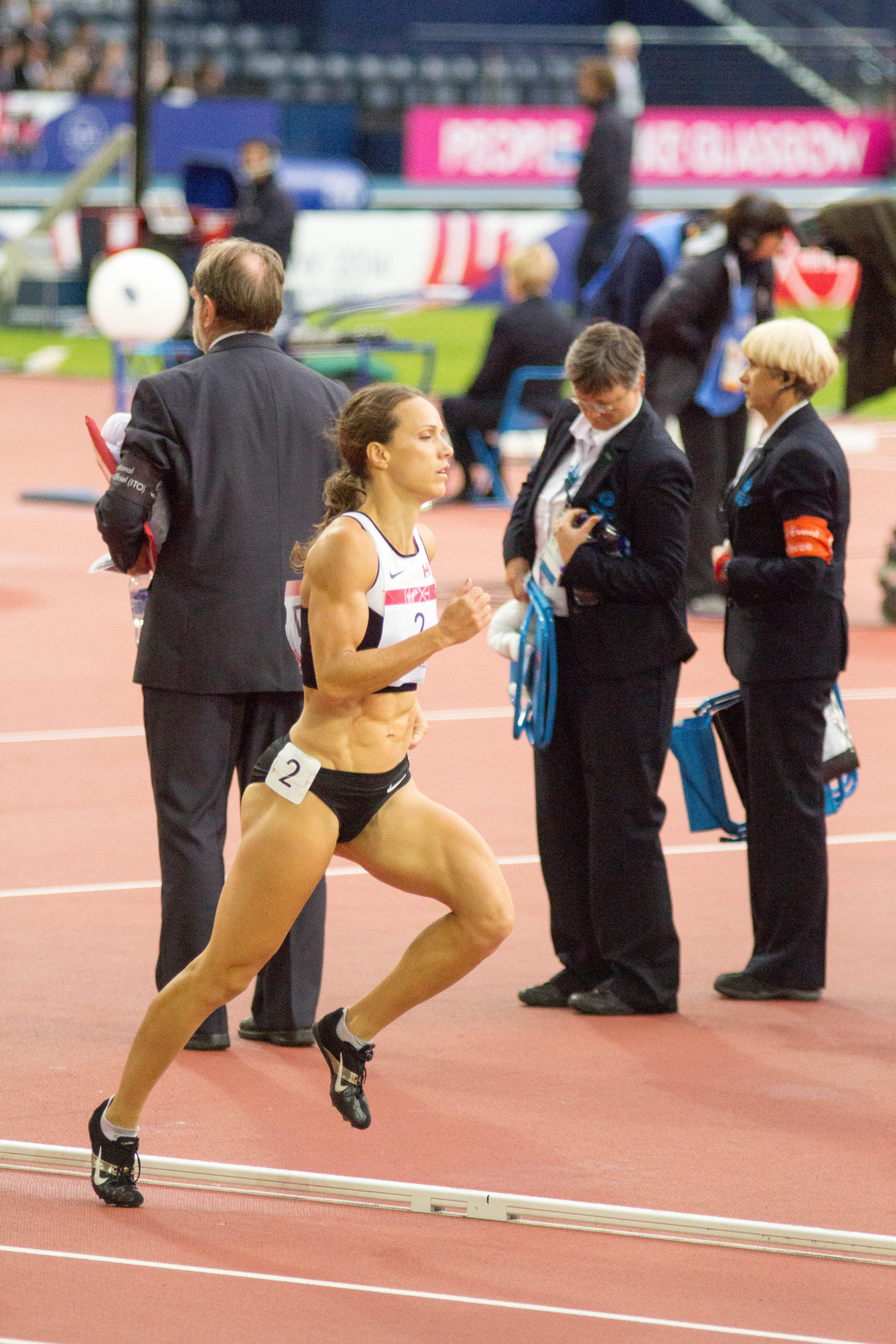
- Zelinka at the 2014 Commonwealth Games

Personal information
- Nationality: Canadian
- Born: 3 September 1981 (age 44) London, Ontario, Canada
- Height: 5 ft 8 in (1.73 m)
- Weight: 140 lb (64 kg)

Sport
- Sport: Heptathlon
- Club: New York Athletic Club
- Now coaching: Les Gramantik

Achievements and titles
- Personal bests: Heptathlon: 6599 points Calgary, 2012; Pentathlon: 4326, Regina, 2005; 100 m hurdles: 12.65, London, 2012
Medal record
Commonwealth Games
Silver medal – second place	2010 Delhi	Heptathlon
Silver medal – second place	2014 Glasgow	Heptathlon
Pan American Games
Gold medal – first place	2007 Rio de Janeiro	Heptathlon
- Updated on July 2012

Jessica Zelinka (born 3 September 1981) is a Canadian pentathlete, heptathlete and 100 m hurdler. Her personal best score is 6599 points for the heptathlon. She was the gold medalist at the 2007 Pan American Games. Zelinka won silver at the 2010 Commonwealth Games and repeated her silver medal at the 2014 Commonwealth Games. At the 2012 Summer Olympics Zelinka finished in 6th overall in the heptathlon and 7th in the 100 m hurdles.

== Career ==
Zelinka first became interested in track and field in elementary school and competed in her first heptathlon at 16. She missed much of the 1999 outdoor season because of an illness. Her first international competition was the 2000 IAAF World Junior Championships in Athletics, where she was fifth in the heptathlon and also competed in the heats of the 100 meter hurdles. She missed most of the 2002 season due to a back and hamstring injury. Zelinka's first major global outing came at the 2005 World Championships in Athletics and she finished in eleventh place. She just missed out on the medals at the 2006 Commonwealth Games having finished in fourth place.

Regional success came at the 2007 Pan American Games as she fended off Gretchen Quintana, among others, to top the podium and take the gold medal. She set a new personal best and Canadian record points score for heptathlon, with 6343. She was selected for the 2007 World Championships in Athletics, but did not compete.

She finished in fifth place at the 2008 Summer Olympics. This equalled the best place finish of a Canadian woman in a multi-events sport at the Olympics. At the Beijing Olympics, she set a new Canadian record for heptathlon, with 6490 points. After her Olympic appearance, she took the 2009 season off from competition and had a daughter with her partner Nathaniel Miller, a Canadian international in water polo.

Building up to the 2010 Commonwealth Games, she finished third in the heptathlon at the Décastar meeting in Talence, France. She earned a season's best total of 6204 points. At the games Zelinka was battling the traveler's diarrhea that affected many athletes in Delhi. Despite the challenges she managed to finish a respectable second and win the silver. Though she did medal Zelinka admitted some disappointment as she had gone to Delhi to win gold. Zelinka's medal was notable however as she just had a baby the previous year and had taken that season off and only returned to competition in 2010.

As of 2012, Zelinka's coach is Les Gramantik. During the 2012 Canadian Olympic trials for track and field, she set a new personal best, of 6599 points, and new Canadian record score for heptathletes, on 28 June 2012, besting her old personal best and Canadian record, set at the 2008 Olympics. This selected her for the 2012 London Olympics for heptathlon. Two days later, she finished first in the 100 m hurdles, qualifying her for that event as well. She had considered foregoing it to concentrate on the heptathlon, but decided to compete in both events. At the 2012 London Olympics, Zelinka finished 7th overall in both the Women's Heptathlon event and the 100 m hurdles.

Zelinka competed at the 2014 Commonwealth Games following a couple years away from the sport, there she won silver behind teammate Brianne Theisen-Eaton.

== Results ==
Year	Competition	Venue	Position	Event	Notes
Representing Canada
1998	Junior Multi-Event Dual Meet	Dordrecht, Netherlands	?	Heptathlon	5250
2000	Canadian Combined Junior Events Championships	Windsor, Canada	1st	Heptathlon	5465
2000	World Junior Championships	Santiago, Chile	5th	Heptathlon	5688
2001	Canadian Track and Field Championships	Edmonton, Canada	1st	Heptathlon	5356
2001	Toledo Invitational	Toledo, United States	1st	Heptathlon	5423
2003	Canadian Track and Field Championships	Victoria, Canada	3rd	Heptathlon	5716
2004	Canadian Track and Field Championships	Victoria, Canada	1st	Heptathlon	5890
2004	Décastar	Talence, France	6th	Heptathlon	5757
2005	Hypo-Meet	Götzis, Austria	11th	Heptathlon	6137
2005	Canadian Track and Field Championships	Winnipeg, Canada	1st	Heptathlon	5723
2005	IAAF	Arles, France	4th	Heptathlon	6088
2006	Hypo-Meet	Götzis, Austria	4th	Heptathlon	6314
2006	Meeting International d'Arles	Arles, France	1st	Heptathlon	6314
2006	Commonwealth Games	Melbourne, Australia	4th	Heptathlon	6213
2007	Pan American Games	Rio de Janeiro, Brazil	1st	Heptathlon	6136
2007	World Combined Events Challenge	Arles, France	2nd	Heptathlon	6218
2007	IAAF Combined Events Challenge	Götzis, Austria	4th	Heptathlon	6343
2008	Canadian Track and Field Championships	Windsor, Canada	1st	Heptathlon	6017
2008	Meeting International d'Arles	Arles, France	11th	Heptathlon	5329
2008	IAAF Combined Events Challenge	Götzis, Austria	21st	Heptathlon	6034
2008	Olympic Games	Beijing, China	4th	Heptathlon	6490
2010	Commonwealth Games	Delhi, India	2nd	Heptathlon	6100
2010	Décastar meeting	Talence, France	3rd	Heptathlon	6204
2011	Hypo-Meeting	Götzis, Austria	5th	Heptathlon	6353
2011	World Championships	Daegu, South Korea	9th	Heptathlon	6268
2011	Décastar meeting	Talence, France	4th	Heptathlon	6296
2012	Olympic Games	London, United Kingdom	6th	Heptathlon	6480
2012	Olympic Games	London, United Kingdom	6th	100 m hurdles	12.69
2014	Commonwealth Games	Glasgow, United Kingdom	2nd	Heptathlon	6270

== Honours ==
In 2012 Zelinka was awarded the Queen Elizabeth II Diamond Jubilee Medal.
