= Lucimara da Silva =

Brazilian heptathlete

Personal information
- Full name: Lucimara Silvestre da Silva
- Nationality: Brazil
- Born: 10 July 1985 (age 40) Lucélia, São Paulo, Brazil
- Height: 1.74 m (5 ft 9 in)
- Weight: 63 kg (139 lb)

Sport
- Sport: Athletics
Medal record
Women's athletics
Representing Brazil
Pan American Games
| Gold medal – first place | 2011 Guadalajara | Heptathlon |
| Bronze medal – third place | 2007 Rio de Janeiro | Heptathlon |
South American Championships
| Gold medal – first place | 2007 São Paulo | Heptathlon |
| Bronze medal – third place | 2007 São Paulo | 100 m hurdles |
- Updated on 14 May 2013

Lucimara Silvestre da Silva (born 10 July 1985 in Lucélia, São Paulo) is a Brazilian track and field athlete who competes in the heptathlon. She represented her country at the 2008 Beijing Olympics and competed at the World Championships in Athletics in 2007. Her personal best of 6076 points is the South American record for the event.

Following her first national title in 2005, da Silva emerged in 2007; she won the South American Championships with a meet record score and took the bronze medal at the 2007 Pan American Games. She repeated as the continental champion in 2009, but was stripped of the title and banned for two years after she failed a drug test for the banned substance Erythropoietin (EPO).

== Career ==
She began her career as a specialist in the 100 metres hurdles and horizontal jumps. She was the sprint hurdles champion and long jump runner-up at the 2002 South American Youth Championships in Athletics and went on to win the hurdles at the 2003 South American Junior Championships in Athletics, where she was also fifth in the triple jump. She took up the heptathlon in 2004 and made her breakthrough at the national level the following year, winning the Brazil championships with a personal best of 5378 points.

In her first international appearance in the combined events, she came fourth overall at the 2005 South American Championships in Athletics. The following year she competed in Europe for the first time, gaining 4584 points at the Multistars meet in Desenzano del Garda. She improved her best to 5611 points on home turf in São Paulo and demonstrated her versatility at the 2006 Lusophony Games the following month, claiming the hurdles title and helping the Brazilian women to gold medals in the 100 and 400 m relay events.

Following a personal best score of 5897 points for fourth at the 2007 Multistars meeting, her first continental title came at the 2007 South American Championships in Athletics in São Paulo. Her mark of 5803 points was a new championship record and she also managed a bronze medal in the 100 m hurdles at the competition. She scored over 5800 points again at July's Pan American Games and claimed the bronze medal behind Jessica Zelinka and Gretchen Quintana. As her continent's only representative in the women's heptathlon at the 2007 World Championships in Athletics, she finished in 31st place.

Da Silva achieved the Olympic qualifying standard in April 2008, setting a best of 5906 points in Rio de Janeiro. She won the heptathlon gold medal at the 2008 Ibero-American Championships, but did not fare as well at the national championships later that month, as she ended up in fourth. Representing Brazil at the 2008 Beijing Olympics, she came seventeenth in the heptathlon event but broke Conceição Geremias' 25-year-old South American record with her total of 6076 points.

She won at the Brazilian Championships in 2009 with a score of 5884 points and then improved her own meet record to win the 2009 South American Championships in Athletics. However, this mark did not stand as she had failed a doping test in the days prior to the competition, testing positive for the banned substance Recombinant EPO. Her coach, Jayme Netto, admitted that he had administered the drug on a number of his athletes. She was stripped of her South American title and banned from the sport for two years for the doping infraction.

== Personal ==
Lucimara da Silva gave birth to her first daughter, Sellena, in December 2013, and her second daughter, Mia, in May 2016.

== Achievements ==
| Year | Competition | Venue | Position | Event | Notes |
Representing Brazil
| 2002 | South American Youth Championships | Asunción, Paraguay | 1st | 100 m hurdles | 14.54 s (wind: -1.5 m/s) |
| 2002 | South American Youth Championships | Asunción, Paraguay | 2nd | Long jump | 5.90 m w |

== See also ==
- List of doping cases in athletics
