= Meeting International d'Arles =

French athletics meet 1997 to 2009

- Date: June
- Location: Arles, France
- Event type: Track and field
- Established: 1997
- Website: www.decathlonarles.com

The Meeting International in Arles, France was an annual athletics meet in which international athletes competed in the Decathlon and Heptathlon. The meeting took place in Stade Fernand Fournier in early June. It was a part of the IAAF World Combined Events Challenge. The last edition of the event took place in 2009.
