= Fernando Gómez (athlete) =

Spanish Paralympic athlete

Personal information
- Full name: Fernando Gómez Doblas
- Born: 16 October 1965 (age 60) Málaga, Spain
Medal record
Men's paralympic athletics
Representing Spain
Paralympic Games
Silver medal – second place	1996 Atlanta	100 metres - T35
Silver medal – second place	1996 Atlanta	200 metres - T34-35
Silver medal – second place	1996 Atlanta	400 metres - T34-35

Fernando Gómez Doblas (born 16 October 1965 in Málaga) is a track and field athlete from Spain with cerebral palsy. He competes as a T36 type athlete. He competed at the 1996 Summer Paralympics in Atlanta, Georgia, winning a silver in the 400 meter T34-T35 race, the 200 meter T34-T35 race and the 100 meter T35 race. He competed at the 2000 Summer Paralympics in Sydney, Australia, where he did not meal in any of his races.

Fernando competed in two Paralympics, firstly in 1996 where he won silver each of the individual 100m, 200m and 400m and was part of the Spanish 4 × 100 m relay team that failed to finish. The following games in 2000 he again competed in the three sprint events and this time both relays but despite making the final in each event failed to add to his medal tally.
