= Gretchen Quintana =

Cuban heptathlete

Personal information
- Full name: Gretchen Quintana Cordero
- Born: 30 June 1984 (age 42) San Cristóbal, Pinar del Río, Cuba
- Height: 1.73 m (5 ft 8 in)
- Weight: 60 kg (132 lb)

Sport
- Country: Cuba
- Sport: Athletics
Medal record
Representing Cuba
Pan American Games
Silver medal – second place	2007 Rio de Janeiro	Heptathlon
Central American and Caribbean Games
Bronze medal – third place	2006 Cartagena	Heptathlon
- Updated on 17 June 2013

Gretchen Quintana Cordero (also Grechin Quintana; born 30 June 1984) is a Cuban heptathlete, who competed at the 2008 Summer Olympics.

== Personal bests ==
- Heptathlon: 6076 pts – Caracas, Venezuela, 10/11 May 2007

== Achievements ==
Year	Competition	Venue	Position	Event	Notes
Representing Cuba
2005	ALBA Games	Havana, Cuba	2nd	Heptathlon	5295 pts
2006	NACAC U23 Championships	Santo Domingo, Dominican Republic	1st	Heptathlon	5810 pts
2006	Central American and Caribbean Games	Cartagena, Colombia	3rd	Heptathlon	5584 pts
2007	ALBA Games	Caracas, Venezuela	1st	Heptathlon	6076 pts
2007	NACAC Combined Events Championships	Santo Domingo, Dominican Republic	1st	Heptathlon	6007 pts
2007	Pan American Games	Rio de Janeiro, Brazil	2nd	Heptathlon	6000 pts
2007	World Championships	Osaka, Japan	32nd	Heptathlon	4954 pts
2008	Hypo-Meeting	Götzis, Austria	23rd	Heptathlon	5510 pts
2008	Olympic Games	Beijing, China	25th	Heptathlon	5830 pts
2009	Central American and Caribbean Championships	Havana, Cuba	1st	Heptathlon	5710 pts
2010	Ibero-American Championships	San Fernando, Spain	–	Heptathlon	DNF
2011	Central American and Caribbean Championships	Mayagüez, Puerto Rico	1st	Heptathlon	5704 pts
2011	Pan American Games	Guadalajara, Mexico	4th	Heptathlon	5544 pts
