= 2012 Thorpe Cup =

- Dates: 21–22 July 2012
- Host city: Marburg, Germany
- Venue: Georg-Gaßmann-Stadion
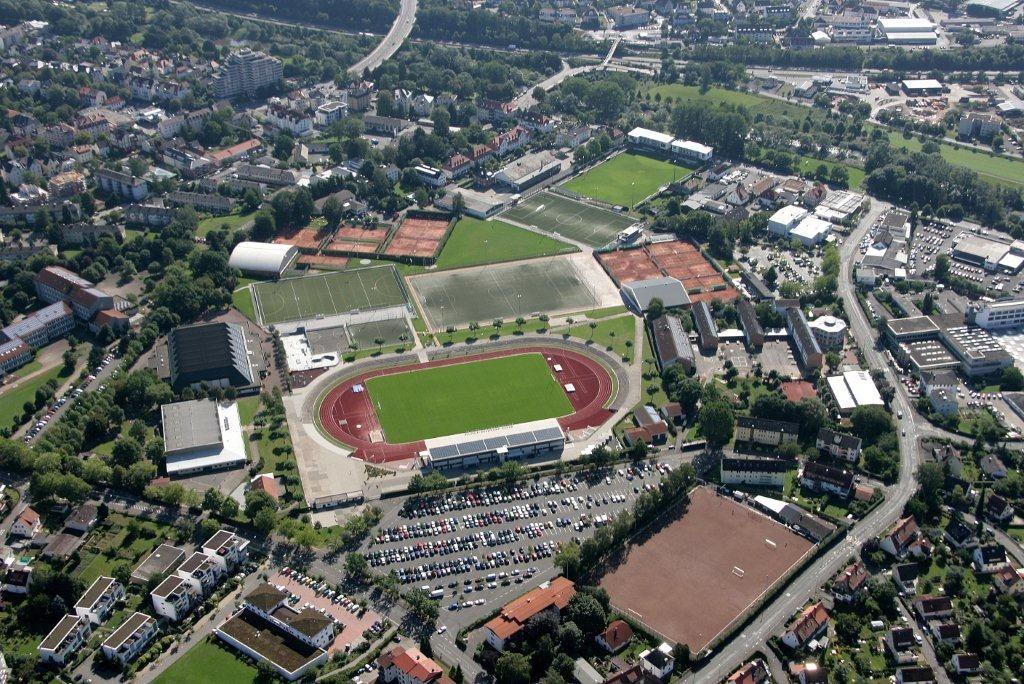
- Participation: 34 athletes

The 2012 Thorpe Cup was held at the Georg-Gaßmann-Stadion in Marburg on 21–22 July 2012.

Kai Kazmirek won the men's decathlon event with a personal best score of 8130 points and Kira Biesenbach won the women's heptathlon event, also recording a personal best, with 5878 points.

A number of Olympic athletes were in Marburg over the weekend to practise for the upcoming Summer Games in London. One month after recording his world record, Ashton Eaton competed in five of the ten disciplines, and even secured personal bests in the shot put and javelin throw.

2012 Thorpe Cup medalists in the men's decathlon
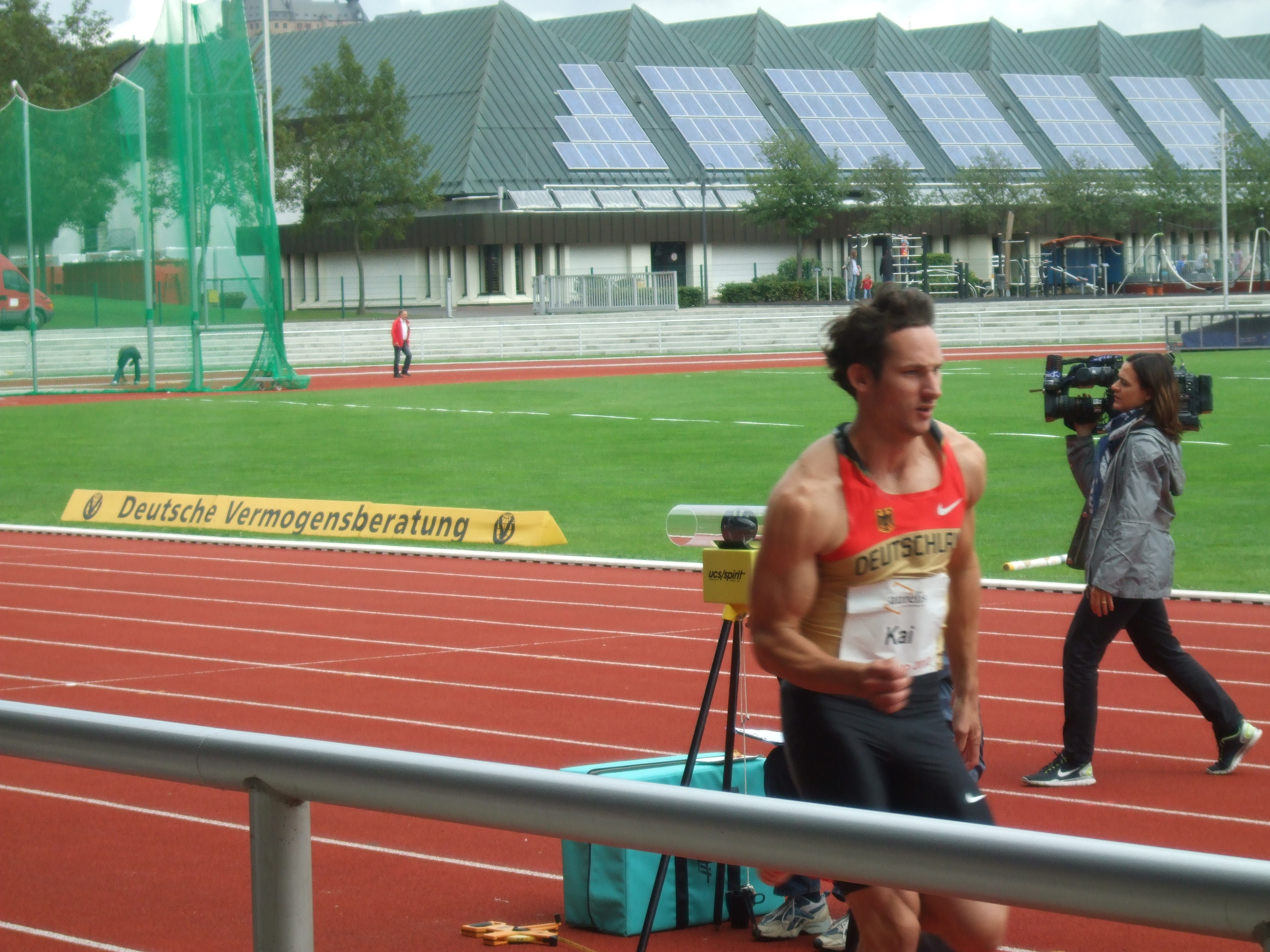
(gold)
Kai Kazmirek
8130 points

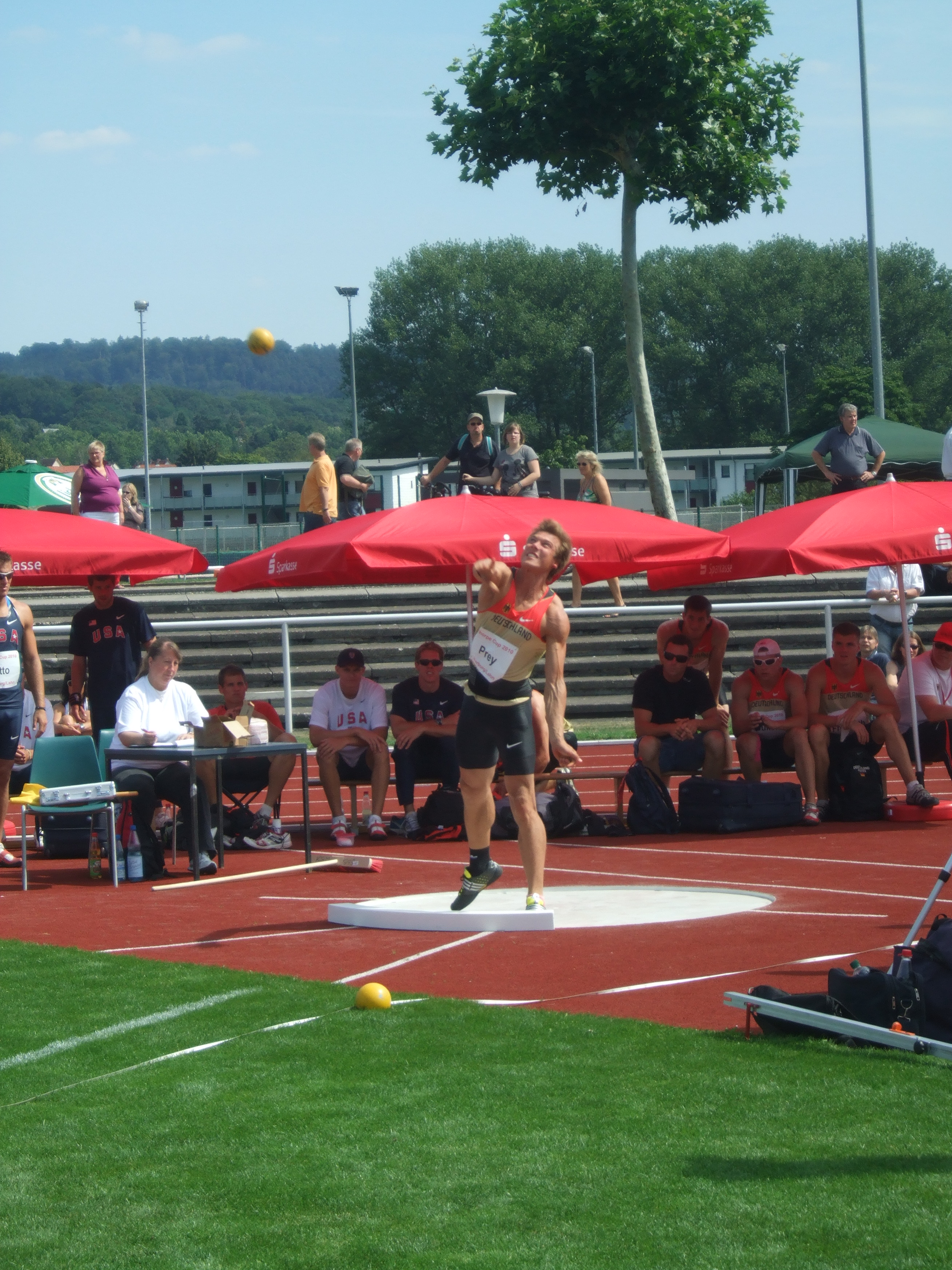
(silver)
Matthias Prey
7777 points

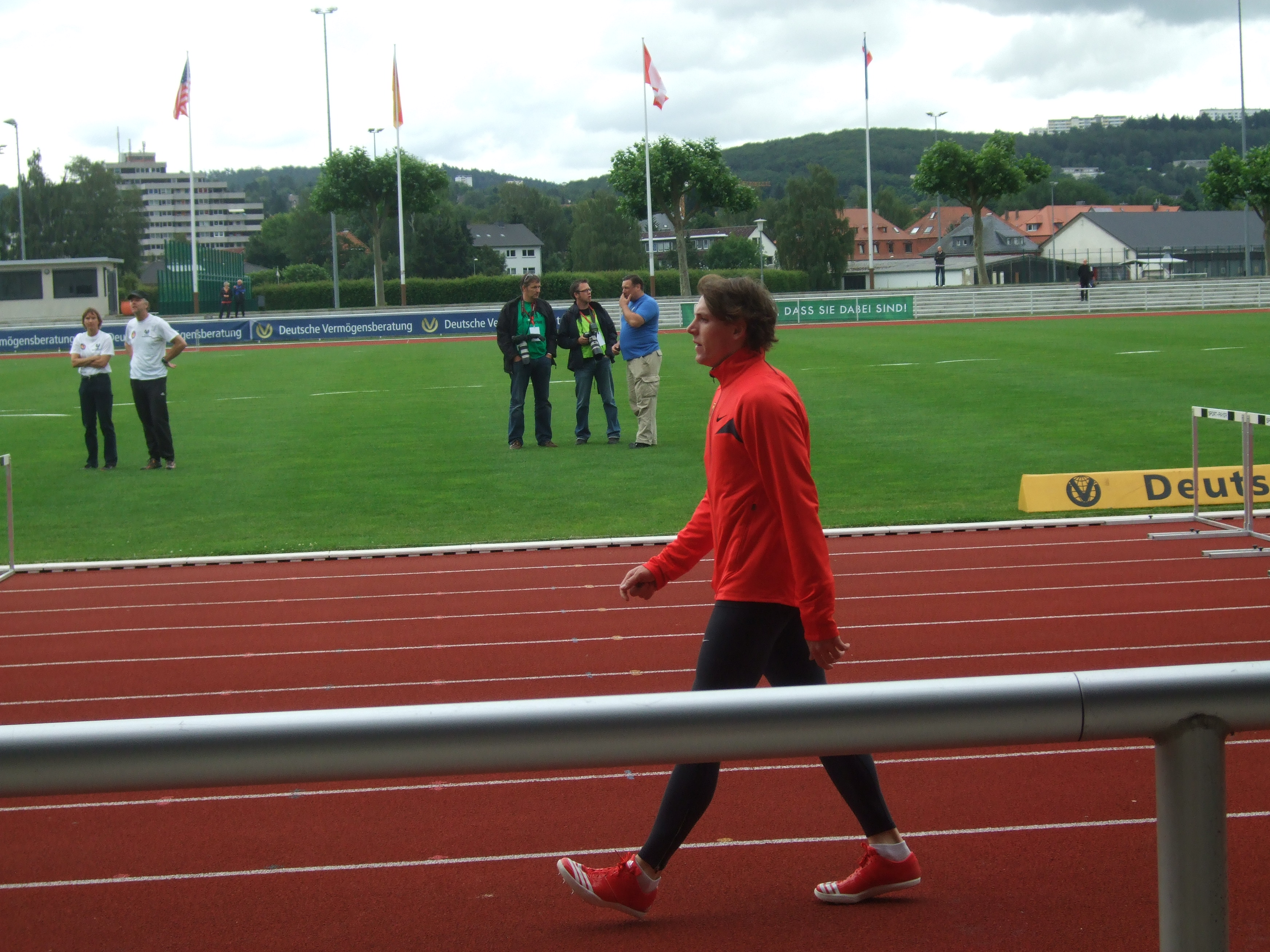
(bronze)
Maximilian Gilde
7687 points
2012 Thorpe Cup medalists in the women's heptathlon
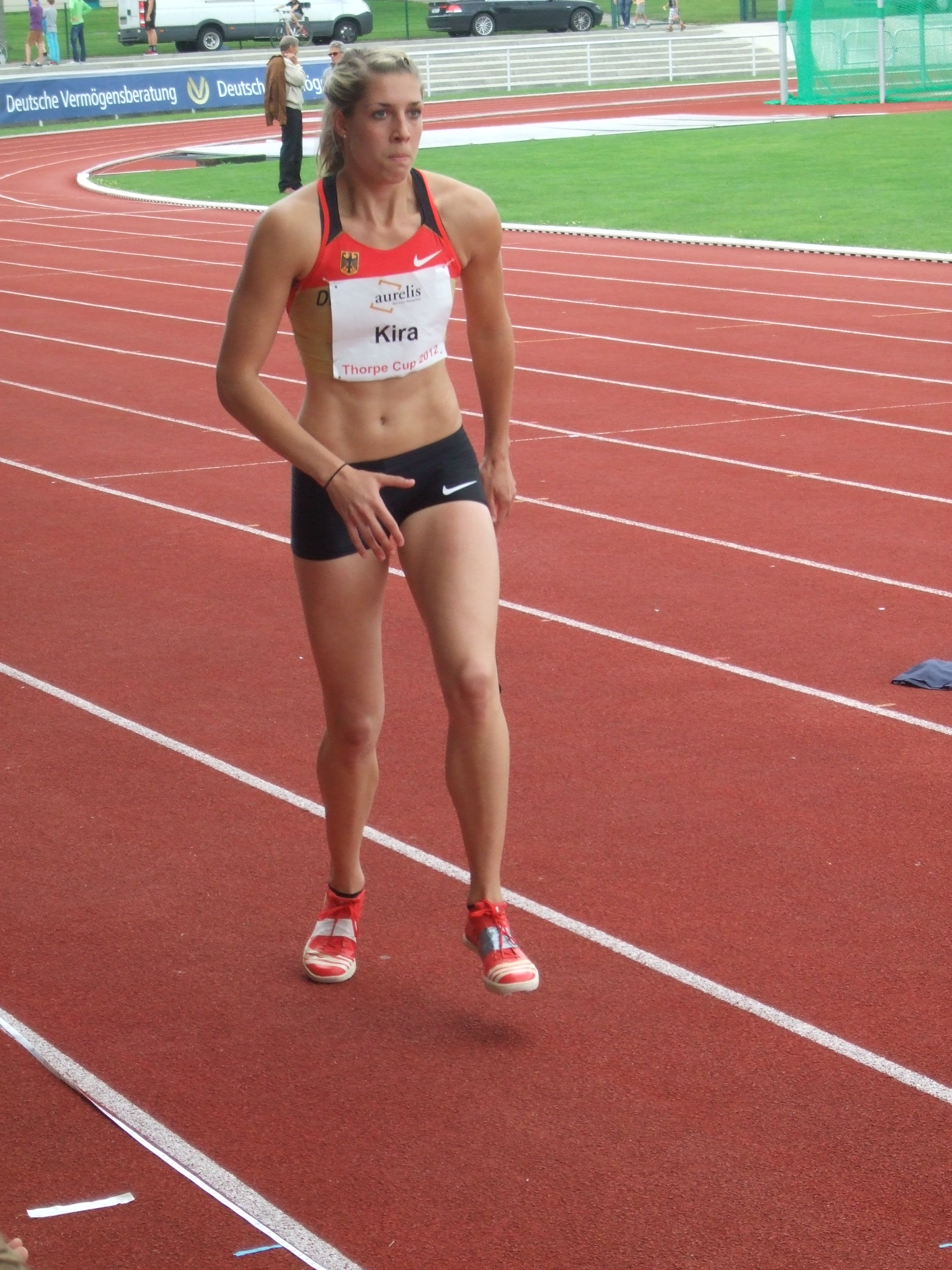
(gold)
Kira Biesenbach
5878 points

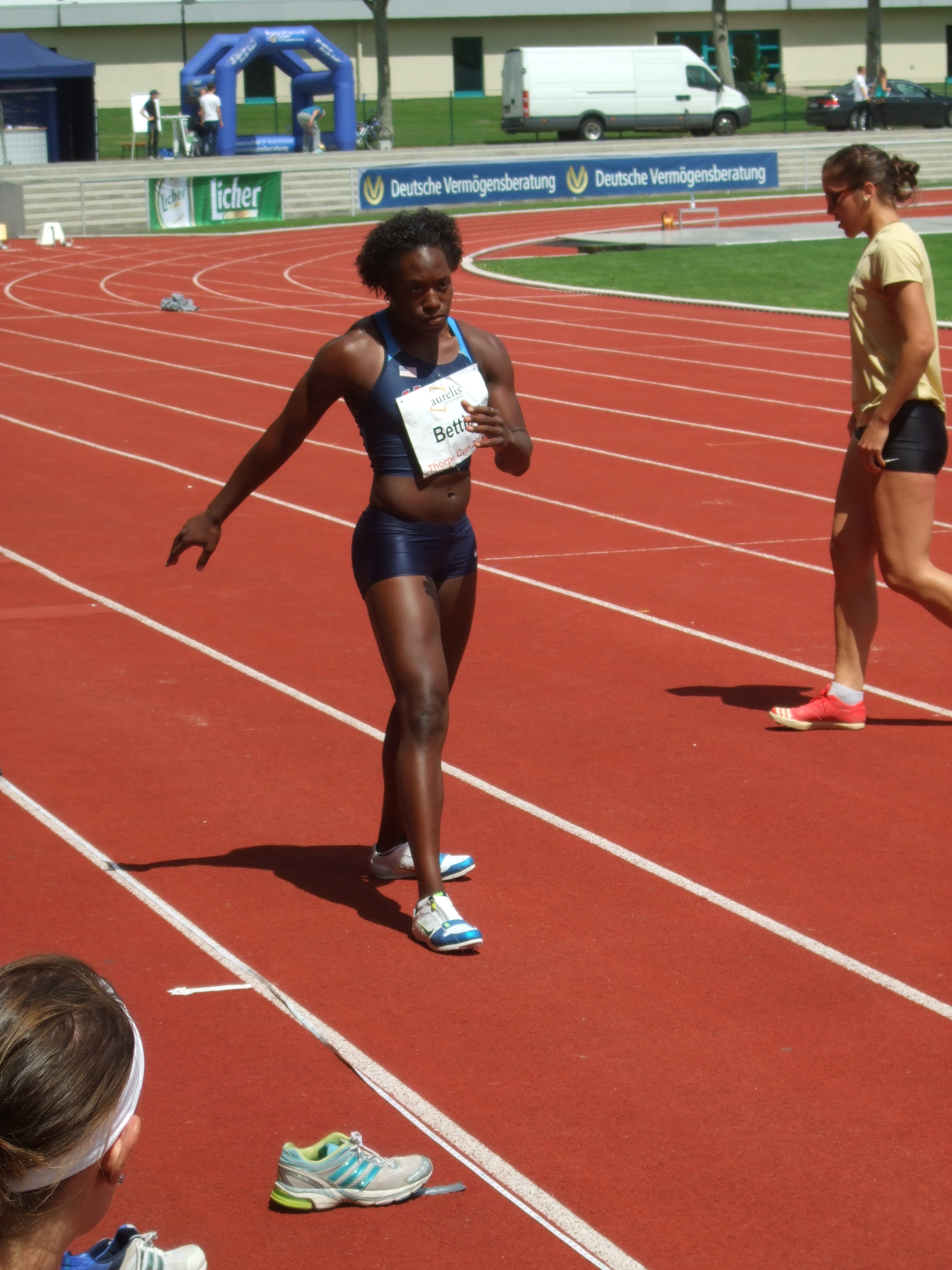
(silver)
Bettie Wade
5795 points

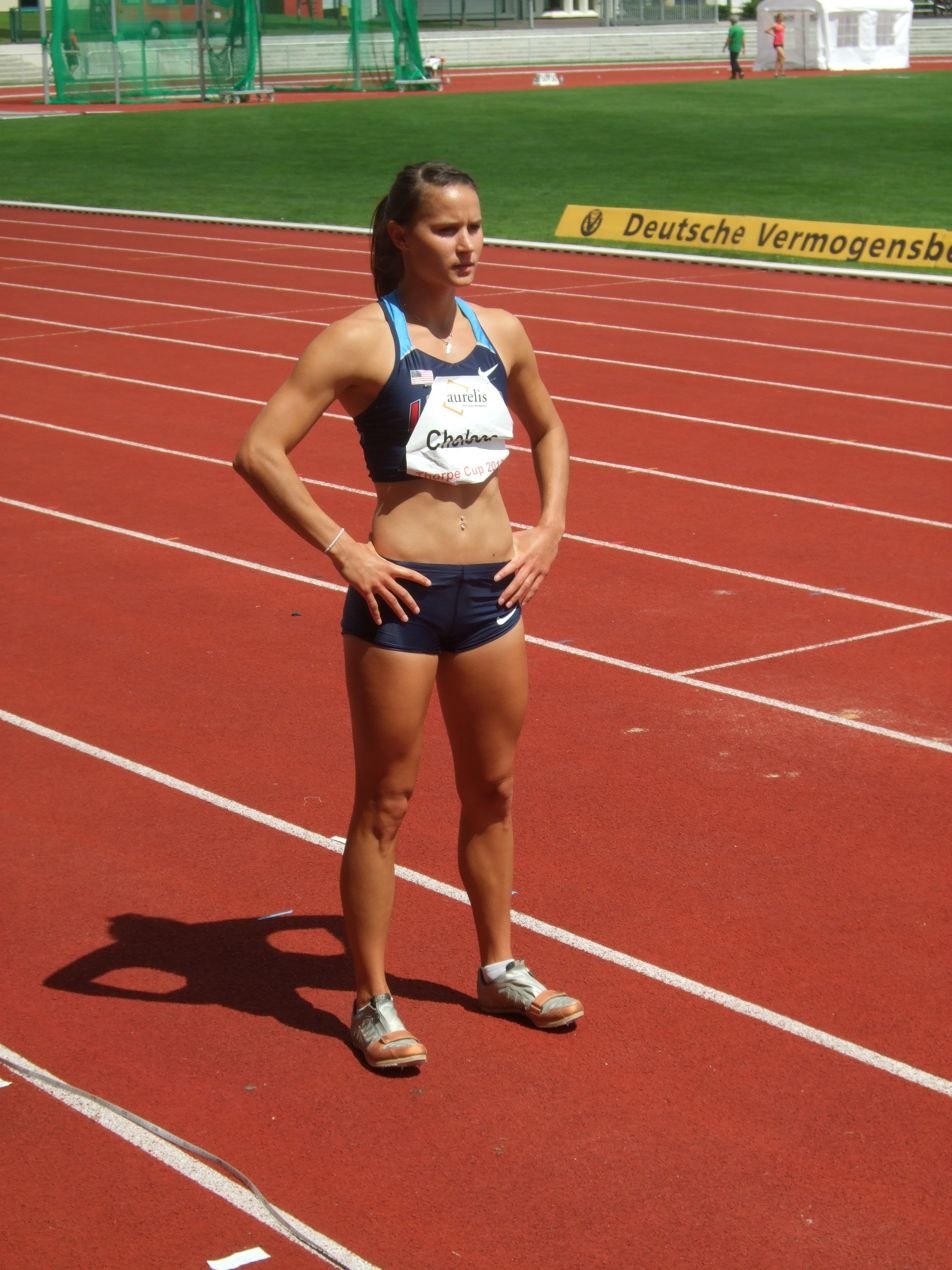
(bronze)
Chelsea Carrier-Eades
5783 points

== Results ==
=== Men's decathlon ===
Rank	Name	Points	Notes	100 m	Long jump	Shot put	High jump	400 m	110 m hurdles	Discus	Pole vault	Javelin	1500 m
1st place, gold medalist(s)	(Germany) Kai Kazmirek	8130	PB	10.86	7.40	13.42	2.07	47.53	14.94	39.47	5.05	56.52	4:35.09
2nd place, silver medalist(s)	(Germany) Matthias Prey	7777		11.28	7.48	15.08	1.86	50.64	14.67	47.59	4.05	59.22	4:33.48
3rd place, bronze medalist(s)	(Germany) Maximilian Gilde	7687		11.28	7.65	11.67	1.92	50.76	14.66	40.14	4.65	63.73	4:42.83
4	(United States) Ryan Harlan	7683		11.28	6.63	15.79	2.01	52.58	14.58	44.42	4.95	65.59	5:23.33
5	(Germany) Moritz Cleve	7570		11.20	6.55	13.95	1.98	50.07	14.48	39.98	4.65	54.46	4:38.96
6	(United States) Joe Detmer	7473		11.16	6.91	11.65	1.98	48.87	15.35	39.20	4.45	53.39	4:24.95
7	(United States) Isaac Murphy	7373		10.82	7.11	12.69	1.86	49.09	14.61	35.61	4.65	43.71	4:40.88
8	(Germany) Patrick Spinner	7357		11.16	7.25	13.48	1.92	51.00	16.55	38.60	4.65	65.50	5:05.56
9	(Germany) Lars Albert	7292		11.50	7.20	14.55	1.86	54.26	15.69	44.63	4.65	58.14	4:58.92
10	(United States) Gray Horn	6990		11.02	7.46	12.92	1.98	50.78	14.36	39.37	4.65	50.61	DNF
11	(United States) Jake Arnold	6909		11.28	6.31	13.46	1.92	50.46	14.38	43.03	4.95	56.68	DNF
12	(United States) Mat Clark	6670		11.28	7.11	12.82	1.98	51.32	16.79	40.28	NM	60.31	4:25.33
13	(United States) Trey Hardee	4212		DNS	7.27	14.95	NM	49.07	DNS	47.75	4.85	DNS	DNS
14	(United States) Ashton Eaton	4163		10.46	DNS	14.78	2.04	DNS	DNS	46.54	DNS	61.68	DNS
15	(Germany) Jan Felix Knobel	3301		DNS	7.14	14.99	NM	DNS	DNS	46.61	4.85	DNS	DNS
16	(Germany) Rico Freimuth	3248		DNS	7.03	13.93	NM	DNS	14.14	NM	4.45	DNS	DNS
17	(United States) Bryan Clay	2523		10.82	7.09	14.96	NM	DNS	DNS	DNS	DNS	DNS	DNS
18	(Germany) Lars Niklas Heinke	2323		11.00	7.40	11.10	DNS	DNS	DNS	DNS	DNS	DNS	DNS

=== Women's heptathlon ===
Rank	Name	Points	Notes	100 m hurdles	High jump	Shot put	200 m	Long jump	Javelin	800 m
1st place, gold medalist(s)	(Germany) Kira Biesenbach	5878	PB	13.96	1.71	13.21	24.18	5.98	37.84	2:17.77
2nd place, silver medalist(s)	(United States) Bettie Wade	5795		13.98	1.74	13.00	25.44	6.20	35.49	2:18.47
3rd place, bronze medalist(s)	(United States) Chelsea Carrier-Eades	5783		13.11	1.65	10.36	23.84	6.10	33.31	2:13.66
4	(United States) Barbara Nwaba	5754		13.80	1.80	12.65	24.52	5.34	35.26	2:14.31
5	(United States) Heather Miller	5729		14.12	1.65	10.89	24.85	6.39	39.11	2:17.22
6	(Germany) Anna Maiwald	5696	PB	13.98	1.59	12.09	24.28	5.61	45.82	2:17.42
7	(Germany) Alina Biesenbach	5677	PB	14.54	1.74	12.23	26.05	6.14	41.25	2:20.41
8	(United States) Lindsay Lettow	5530		14.04	1.74	11.27	25.15	5.62	35.67	2:18.13
9	(Germany) Tilia Udelhoven	5385		14.15	1.56	12.05	25.03	6.01	32.63	2:20.89
10	(United States) Aisha Adams	5316		14.06	1.62	10.53	24.79	5.75	33.17	2:21.30
11	(Germany) Simone Mrotzek	5225	PB	14.60	1.65	10.68	26.49	5.79	37.49	2:21.63
12	(United States) Ryann Krais	4967		14.11	1.77	11.37	25.47	NM	39.88	2:12.05
13	(Germany) Lilli Schwarzkopf	3899		13.42	1.80	DNS	24.75	6.32	DNS	DNS
14	(Germany) Jennifer Oeser	2713		13.64	1.77	13.22	DNS	DNS	DNS	DNS
15	(Germany) Julia Mächtig	2565		14.66	1.68	14.81	DNS	DNS	DNS	DNS
16	(United States) Chantae McMillan	1840		13.78	1.68	DNS	DNS	DNS	DNS	DNS
