= Athletics at the 2015 Pan American Games – Women's heptathlon =

Women's heptathlon at the 2015 Pan American Games
- Venue: CIBC Pan Am and Parapan Am Athletics Stadium
- Dates: July 24 – July 25
- Competitors: 12 from 8 nations
- Winning points: 6332

Medalists
Gold medal	Yorgelis Rodríguez	Cuba
Silver medal	Heather Miller	United States
Bronze medal	Vanessa Spínola	Brazil

The women's heptathlon competition of the athletics events at the 2015 Pan American Games will take place between the 24 and 25 of July at the CIBC Pan Am and Parapan Am Athletics Stadium. The defending Pan American Games champion is Lucimara da Silva from Brazil.

== Records ==
Prior to this competition, the existing world and Pan American Games records were as follows:

World record	Jackie Joyner-Kersee (USA)	7291	Seoul, South Korea	September 24, 1988
Pan American Games record	Magalys García (CUB)	6290	Winnipeg, Canada	July 28, 1999

== Qualification ==
Each National Olympic Committee (NOC) was able to enter up to two entrants providing they had met the minimum standard (4995) in the qualifying period (January 1, 2014 to June 28, 2015).

== Schedule ==
Date	Time	Round
July 24, 2015	10:45	100 metres hurdles
July 24, 2015	11:30	High jump
July 24, 2015	17:50	Shot put
July 24, 2015	19:10	200 metres
July 25, 2015	18:35	Long jump
July 25, 2015	19:55	Javelin throw
July 25, 2015	21:35	800 metres
July 25, 2015	21:35	Final standings

== Results ==
All times shown are in seconds.

KEY:	q	Fastest non-qualifiers	Q	Qualified	NR	National record	PB	Personal best	SB	Seasonal best	DQ	Disqualified

=== 100 m hurdles ===
Rank	Heat	Name	Nationality	Time	Wind	Points	Notes
1	2	Jessica Zelinka	Canada	13.12	+0.2	1106	
2	2	Heather Miller	United States	13.66	+0.2	1027	
3	2	Anna Camila Pirelli	Paraguay	13.72	+0.2	1018	
4	2	Breanna Leslie	United States	13.73	+0.2	1017	
5	1	Yorgelis Rodríguez	Cuba	13.81	-1.7	1005	
6	1	Yusleidys Mendieta	Cuba	13.89	-1.7	994	
7	2	Alysbeth Felix	Puerto Rico	13.96	+0.2	984	
8	1	Vanessa Spínola	Brazil	14.03	-1.7	974	
9	1	Jessamyn Sauceda	Mexico	14.09	-1.7	966	
10	1	Tamara de Sousa	Brazil	14.33	-1.7	932	
11	1	Evelis Aguilar	Colombia	14.35	-1.7	929	
	1	Jillian Drouin	Canada	DSQ	-1.7	0	

=== High jump ===
Rank	Name	Nationality	1.47	1.50	1.53	1.56	1.59	1.62	1.65	1.68	1.71	1.74	1.77	1.80	1.83	1.86	Mark	Points	Notes
1	Yorgelis Rodríguez	Cuba									o		o	o	o	xxx	1.83	1016	
2	Jillian Drouin	Canada									o	o	o	o	xxx		1.80	978	
3	Heather Miller	United States							xo	o	o	o	xo	xxo	xxx		1.80	978	
4	Vanessa Spínola	Brazil						o	o	o	o	o	xxo	xxx			1.77	941	
5	Alysbeth Felix	Puerto Rico							o	o	xxo	xo	xxx				1.74	903	
5	Jessamyn Sauceda	Mexico					o	o	o	xo	xo	xo	xxx				1.74	903	
7	Evelis Aguilar	Colombia		o		o	o	o	o	o	xxx						1.68	830	
8	Tamara de Sousa	Brazil						o	xo	xo	xxx						1.68	830	
8	Breanna Leslie	United States						xo	o	xo	xxx						1.68	830	
10	Yusleidys Mendieta	Cuba							o		xxx						1.65	795	
11	Jessica Zelinka	Canada				o	o	o	xxo	xxx							1.65	795	
12	Anna Camila Pirelli	Paraguay	o	xo	o	o	xxx										1.56	689	

=== Shot put ===
Rank	Name	Nationality	#1	#2	#3	Mark	Points	Notes
1	Yusleidys Mendieta	Cuba	12.73	14.40	13.45	14.40	821	
2	Vanessa Spínola	Brazil	13.84	14.32	14.20	14.32	815	
3	Yorgelis Rodríguez	Cuba	13.08	14.14	x	14.14	803	
4	Tamara de Sousa	Brazil	13.94	13.90	x	13.94	790	
5	Jessica Zelinka	Canada	13.08	13.55	13.87	13.87	785	
6	Anna Camila Pirelli	Paraguay	13.32	12.41	13.25	13.32	749	
7	Jillian Drouin	Canada	12.12	x	12.80	12.80	714	
8	Evelis Aguilar	Colombia	12.55	11.97	12.15	12.55	698	
9	Heather Miller	United States	12.20	12.02	12.34	12.34	684	
10	Jessamyn Sauceda	Mexico	11.89	12.16	11.39	12.16	672	
11	Breanna Leslie	United States	9.79	11.85	10.89	11.85	651	
12	Alysbeth Felix	Puerto Rico	11.12	10.94	9.64	11.12	603	

=== 200 metres ===
Rank	Heat	Name	Nationality	Time	Wind	Points	Notes
1	2	Evelis Aguilar	Colombia	23.99	+0.5	982	
2	2	Vanessa Spínola	Brazil	24.00	+0.5	981	
3	2	Yusleidys Mendieta	Cuba	24.22	+0.5	960	
4	1	Yorgelis Rodríguez	Cuba	24.25	+1.5	957	
5	2	Heather Miller	United States	24.30	+0.5	952	
6	1	Jessica Zelinka	Canada	24.47	+1.5	936	
7	2	Breanna Leslie	United States	24.58	+0.5	926	
8	2	Alysbeth Felix	Puerto Rico	24.69	+0.5	915	
9	1	Jessamyn Sauceda	Mexico	25.11	+1.5	877	
10	1	Tamara de Sousa	Brazil	25.18	+1.5	870	
11	1	Anna Camila Pirelli	Paraguay	25.48	+1.5	843	
12	1	Jillian Drouin	Canada	25.51	+1.5	841	

=== Long jump ===
Rank	Name	Nationality	#1	#2	#3	Mark	Wind	Points	Notes
1	Jessamyn Sauceda	Mexico	6.35	x	6.06	6.35	+1.9	959	
2	Heather Miller	United States	6.11	6.02	6.28	6.28	+2.9	937	
3	Yorgelis Rodríguez	Cuba	6.25	x	x	6.25	-0.4	927	
4	Alysbeth Felix	Puerto Rico	6.08	6.17	4.38	6.17	+1.5	902	
5	Evelis Aguilar	Colombia	6.15	6.03	6.02	6.15	+3.0	896	
6	Breanna Leslie	United States	5.61	5.90	5.40	5.90	+1.8	819	
7	Yusleidys Mendieta	Cuba	5.74	5.89	5.85	5.89	+1.6	816	
8	Vanessa Spínola	Brazil	5.83	5.79	5.77	5.83	+0.5	798	
9	Tamara de Sousa	Brazil	5.65	5.46	5.55	5.65	+0.3	744	
10	Anna Camila Pirelli	Paraguay	5.37	5.36	5.54	5.54	+1.2	712	
	Jillian Drouin	Canada				DNS			
	Jessica Zelinka	Canada				DNS			

=== Javelin throw ===
Rank	Name	Nationality	#1	#2	#3	Mark	Points	Notes
1	Yorgelis Rodríguez	Cuba	x	48.32	46.61	48.32	828	
2	Yusleidys Mendieta	Cuba	47.27	44.49	48.08	48.08	823	
3	Anna Camila Pirelli	Paraguay	44.38	42.95	47.38	47.38	809	
4	Tamara de Sousa	Brazil	46.96	45.10	45.48	46.96	801	
5	Vanessa Spínola	Brazil	37.11	41.91	42.38	42.38	713	
6	Evelis Aguilar	Colombia	38.63	x	41.02	41.02	687	
7	Breanna Leslie	United States	38.53	x	40.84	40.84	683	
8	Heather Miller	United States	38.66	39.75	40.31	40.31	673	
9	Alysbeth Felix	Puerto Rico	34.49	35.35	39.38	39.38	655	
10	Jessamyn Sauceda	Mexico	35.56	38.51	x	38.51	639	
	Jillian Drouin	Canada				DNS		
	Jessica Zelinka	Canada				DNS		

=== 800 metres ===
Rank	Name	Nationality	Time	Points	Notes
1	Heather Miller	United States	2:12.57	927	
2	Breanna Leslie	United States	2:13.25	918	
3	Evelis Aguilar	Colombia	2:13.95	908	
4	Alysbeth Felix	Puerto Rico	2:18.19	848	
5	Anna Camila Pirelli	Paraguay	2:18.59	843	
6	Vanessa Spínola	Brazil	2:20.81	813	
7	Yorgelis Rodríguez	Cuba	2:22.01	796	
8	Jessamyn Sauceda	Mexico	2:23.97	770	
9	Yusleidys Mendieta	Cuba	2:33.42	651	
10	Tamara de Sousa	Brazil	2:39.83	575	
	Jillian Drouin	Canada	DNS		
	Jessica Zelinka	Canada	DNS		

=== Final standings ===
Rank	Name	Nationality	Points	Notes
1st place, gold medalist(s)	Yorgelis Rodríguez	Cuba	6332	GR, PB
2nd place, silver medalist(s)	Heather Miller	United States	6178	
3rd place, bronze medalist(s)	Vanessa Spínola	Brazil	6035	
4	Evelis Aguilar	Colombia	5930	NR
5	Yusleidys Mendieta	Cuba	5860	
6	Breanna Leslie	United States	5844	
7	Alysbeth Felix	Puerto Rico	5810	NR
8	Jessamyn Sauceda	Mexico	5786	NR
9	Anna Camila Pirelli	Paraguay	5663	SB
10	Tamara de Sousa	Brazil	5542	
	Jillian Drouin	Canada	DNF	
	Jessica Zelinka	Canada	DNF	
