= Nwaba =

Nwaba may refer to:

== Surname ==
- Barbara Nwaba (born 1989), American track and field athlete
- David Nwaba (born 1993), American basketball player
