= Heather Miller (heptathlete) =

American track and field athlete (born 1987)

Heather Miller-Koch
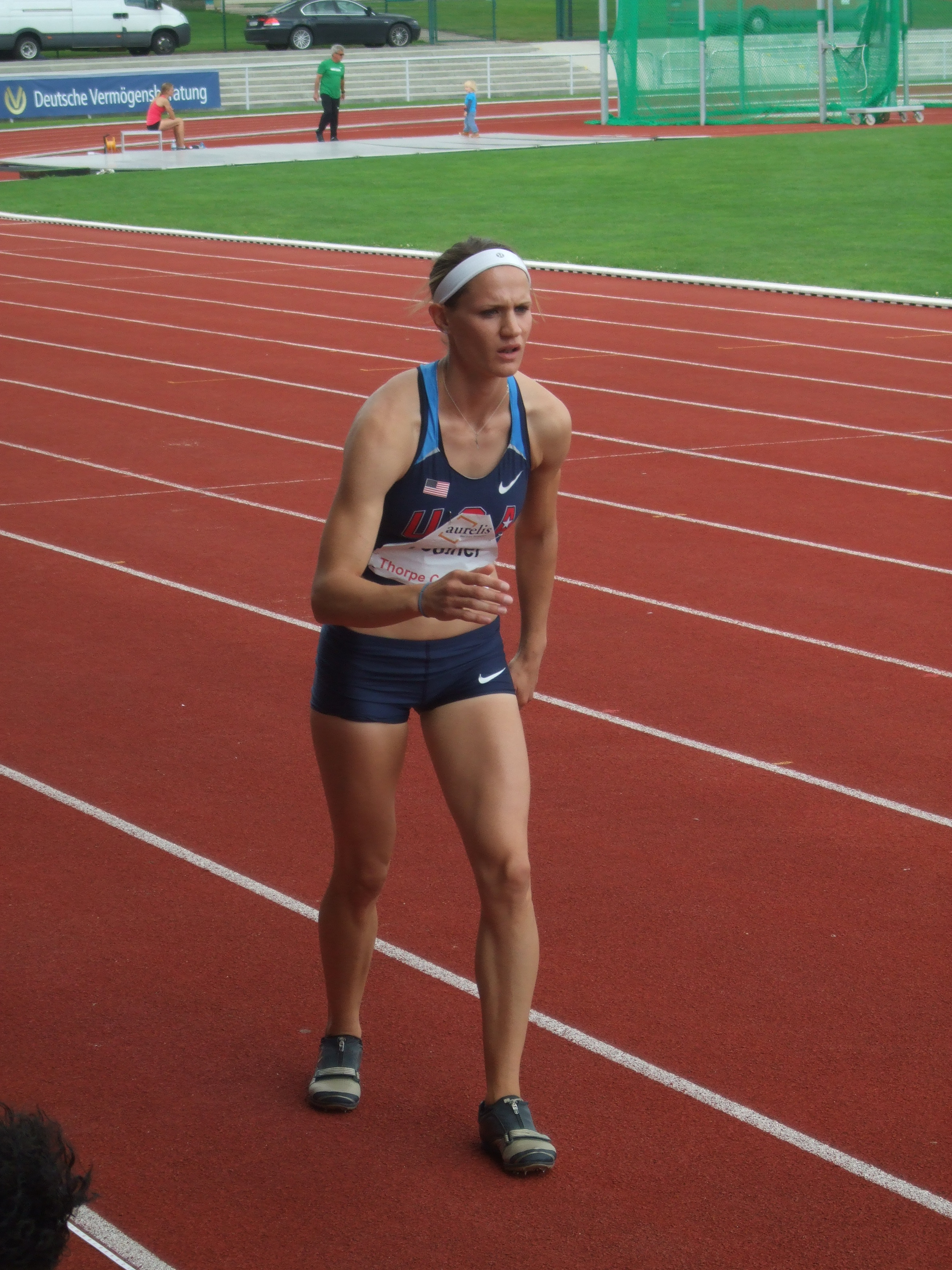

Personal information
- Born: Heather Miller; March 30, 1987 (age 39) Madison, Wisconsin, U.S.
- Education: St. Cloud State University
- Height: 5 ft 9 in (175 cm)
- Website: https://www.athletebiz.us/heather-miller-koch

Sport
- Sport: Track and field
- Event(s): Heptathlon, pentathlon
- College team: St. Cloud State Huskies
- Club: Central Park Track Club
- Turned pro: 2010

Achievements and titles
- Personal best: Heptathlon: 6423 Pentathlon: 4105
Medal record
Representing the United States
2015 Pan American Games
| Silver medal – second place | 2015 Toronto | Heptathlon |

Heather Miller-Koch (born March 30, 1987) is an American track and field athlete who represents the Central Park Track Club. She participates in multi events, the pentathlon and heptathlon.

== High school ==
Miller graduated in 2005 from Columbus High School in Columbus, Wisconsin. She won the 2003 Wisconsin Interscholastic Athletic Association state championship in the triple jump in 36 ft 6.5 in (11.138 m) and was runner up in the 2004 WIAA state championship triple jump in 37 ft 9.5 in (11.519 m).

== College ==
St. Cloud State University alum captured the 2010 NCAA Division II indoor track and field title in the pentathlon.

The St. Cloud State Huskies alumna is a 10-time All-American, having won NSIC titles during her college career in the indoor 60 meter hurdles (2009 and 2010), indoor triple jump (2009 and 2010), indoor pentathlon (2010), outdoor triple jump (2009 and 2010), outdoor long jump (2010) and outdoor heptathlon (2010).

Miller broke Northern Sun Intercollegiate Conference records in the indoor pentathlon and outdoor heptathlon. Heather's heptathlon record was broken by Bree Woeber at Northern Sun Conference Championships at Augustana University in 2016.

== Professional ==
Miller-Koch is a part-time operating room nurse, specializing in orthopedic surgery at United Hospital in St. Paul, Minnesota.

She finished ninth in the heptathlon at the 2012 United States Olympic Trials (track and field) and qualified to represent Team USA. Miller finished fifth in the 2012 Thorpe Cup.

Miller finished fifth in the heptathlon scoring 5945 points in the 2013 USA Outdoor Track and Field Championships in Des Moines, Iowa and qualified to represent Team USA in the Thorpe Cup for the second consecutive year.

Miller finished fourth in the heptathlon at the 2014 USA Outdoor Track and Field Championships in Sacramento, California, scoring 6100.

Miller-Koch finished fourth in the heptathlon at the 2015 USA Outdoor Track and Field Championships in Eugene, Oregon, scoring 6274.

Miller-Koch finished second and scored a personal best 6423 points in the heptathlon to join Team USA teammates Barbara Nwaba and Kendell Williams at the 2016 United States Olympic Trials (track and field) and represented the United States at Athletics at the 2016 Summer Olympics – Women's heptathlon, finishing 18th.
