= Evelis Aguilar =

Colombian heptathlete

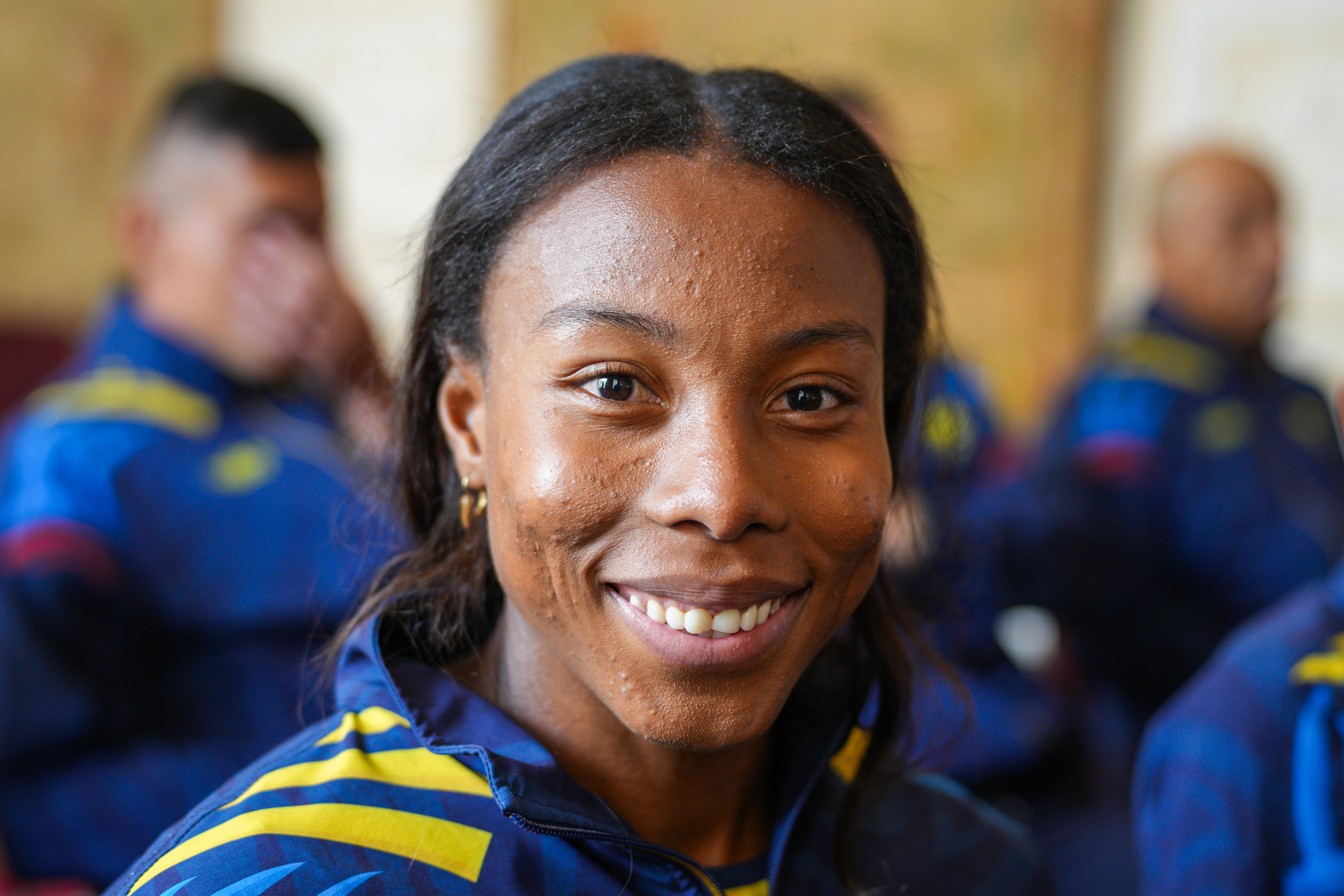
- Evelis Aguilar, 2024

Personal information
- Full name: Evelis Jazmin Aguilar Torres
- Born: January 3, 1993 (age 33) Chigorodó, Colombia
- Height: 1.78 m (5 ft 10 in)
- Weight: 62 kg (137 lb)

Sport
- Country: Colombia
- Sport: Athletics
- Events: 400 metres; Heptathlon; 4×400 metres; Mixed relay

Achievements and titles
- Personal bests: 400 metres: 49.80 (2025); Heptathlon: 6346 pts (2021); 4×400 metres: 3:29.94 NR (2011); Mixed relay: 3:14.42 AR (2025)
Medal record
Representing Colombia
Women's athletics
Event	1st	2nd	3rd
World Combined Events Tour meetings	2	0	0
Pan American Games	0	0	2
Ibero-American Championships	0	1	0
CAC Games	0	1	3
South American Games	2	1	0
South American Championships	6	3	0
Bolivarian Games	2	1	0
South American U23 Championships	1	0	0
South American U20 Championships	1	1	0
South American U18 Championships	1	0	1
Total	15	8	6
Pan American Games
Bronze medal – third place	2011 Guadalajara	4×400 m relay
Bronze medal – third place	2023 Santiago	400 m
Ibero-American Championships
Silver medal – second place	2016 Rio de Janeiro	Heptathlon
Central American and Caribbean Games
Silver medal – second place	2018 Barranquilla	Heptathlon
Bronze medal – third place	2014 Veracruz	4×400 m relay
Bronze medal – third place	2023 San Salvador	4×400 m relay
Bronze medal – third place	2023 San Salvador	Mixed relay
South American Games
Gold medal – first place	2022 Asunción	400 m
Gold medal – first place	2022 Asunción	4×400 m relay
Silver medal – second place	2014 Santiago	4×400 m relay
South American Championships
Gold medal – first place	2015 Lima	Heptathlon
Gold medal – first place	2021 Guayaquil	Heptathlon
Gold medal – first place	2021 Guayaquil	4×400 m relay
Gold medal – first place	2023 São Paulo	4×400 m relay
Gold medal – first place	2023 São Paulo	Mixed relay
Gold medal – first place	2025 Mar del Plata	4×400 m relay
Silver medal – second place	2011 Buenos Aires	4×400 m relay
Silver medal – second place	2023 São Paulo	400 m
Silver medal – second place	2025 Mar del Plata	400 m
Bolivarian Games
Gold medal – first place	2022 Valledupar	400 m
Gold medal – first place	2022 Valledupar	4×400 m relay
Silver medal – second place	2022 Valledupar	Mixed relay
South American U23 Championships
Gold medal – first place	2014 Montevideo	Heptathlon
South American U20 Championships
Gold medal – first place	2011 Medellín	4×400 m relay
Silver medal – second place	2011 Medellín	400 m
South American U18 Championships
Gold medal – first place	2010 Santiago	400 m
Bronze medal – third place	2008 Lima	400 m

Evelis Jazmin Aguilar Torres (born 3 January 1993) is a Colombian athlete competing in the combined events. Earlier in her career she specialised in the 400 metres sprint.

With a personal best of 6,346 points, it is the second best historical record at the South American level.

== International competitions ==
Year	Competition	Venue	Position	Event	Notes
Representing Colombia
2008	South American U18 Championships	Lima, Peru	3rd	400 m	57.67 s
2010	South American U18 Championships	Santiago, Chile	1st	400 m	55.64 s
2011	South American Championships	Buenos Aires, Argentina	2nd	4 × 400 m relay	3:37.66
2011	South American U20 Championships	Medellín, Colombia	2nd	400 m	54.45 s
2011	South American U20 Championships	Medellín, Colombia	1st	4 × 400 m relay	3:36.74
2011	Pan American Games	Guadalajara, Mexico	3rd	4 × 400 m relay	3:29.94 NR
2012	World U20 Championships	Barcelona, Spain	7th (h)	4 × 400 m relay	3:39.44
2014	South American Games	Santiago, Chile	2nd	4 × 400 m relay	3:35.96
2014	South American Games	Santiago, Chile	4th	Heptathlon	5504 pts
2014	Ibero-American Championships	São Paulo, Brazil	5th	Heptathlon	5518 pts
2014	South American U23 Championships	Montevideo, Uruguay	1st	Heptathlon	5333 pts
2014	Central American and Caribbean Games	Xalapa, Mexico	3rd	4 × 400 m relay	3:34.14
2015	South American Championships	Lima, Peru	1st	Heptathlon	5902 pts NR, CR
2015	Pan American Games	Toronto, Canada	4th	Heptathlon	5930 pts NR
2016	Ibero-American Championships	Rio de Janeiro, Brazil	2nd	Heptathlon	5887 pts
2016	Olympic Games	Rio de Janeiro, Brazil	15th	Heptathlon	6263 pts
2016	Décastar	Talence, France	7th	Heptathlon	6061 pts
2017	Multistars	Florence, Italy	1st	Heptathlon	6228 pts
2017	World Championships	London, United Kingdom	—N/a	Heptathlon	DNF
2018	Central American and Caribbean Games	Barranquilla, Colombia	2nd	Heptathlon	6285 pts AR
2020	Meeting de la Réunion	Saint-Paul, France	1st	Heptathlon	6055 pts
2021	South American Championships	Guayaquil, Ecuador	1st	4 × 400 m relay	3:31.04
2021	South American Championships	Guayaquil, Ecuador	1st	Heptathlon	6165 pts CR
2021	Olympic Games	Tokyo, Japan	14th	Heptathlon	6214 pts
2022	Bolivarian Games	Valledupar, Colombia	1st	400 m	51.84 s GR
2022	Bolivarian Games	Valledupar, Colombia	1st	4 × 400 m relay	3:36.91
2022	Bolivarian Games	Valledupar, Colombia	2nd	Mixed relay	3:20.30
2022	South American Games	Asunción, Paraguay	1st	400 m	51.90 s
2022	South American Games	Asunción, Paraguay	1st	4 × 400 m relay	3:31.30 GR
2023	Central American and Caribbean Games	San Salvador, El Salvador	4th	400 m	51.67 s
2023	Central American and Caribbean Games	San Salvador, El Salvador	3rd	4 × 400 m relay	3:31.16
2023	Central American and Caribbean Games	San Salvador, El Salvador	3rd	Mixed relay	3:20.36
2023	South American Championships	São Paulo, Brazil	2nd	400 m	51.41 s
2023	South American Championships	São Paulo, Brazil	1st	4 × 400 m relay	3:31.39
2023	South American Championships	São Paulo, Brazil	1st	Mixed relay	3:14.79 AR, CR
2023	World Championships	Budapest, Hungary	12th (sf)	400 m	51.07 s
2023	Pan American Games	Santiago, Chile	3rd	400 m	51.95 s
2023	Pan American Games	Santiago, Chile	6th	Mixed relay	3:23.17
2024	Xiamen Diamond League	Xiamen, China	8th	400 m	52.97 s
2024	Shanghai Diamond League	Suzhou, China	7th	400 m	53.81 s
2024	Olympic Games	Paris, France	25th (r)	400 m	52.86 s
2025	South American Championships	Mar del Plata, Argentina	2nd	400 m	51.26 s
2025	South American Championships	Mar del Plata, Argentina	1st	4 × 400 m relay	3:33.29
2025	World Championships	Tokyo, Japan	49th (h)	400 m	53.82 s

== Personal bests ==
Outdoor

- 100 metres – 12.07 (-0.9 m/s, Medellín 2016)
- 200 metres – 23.41 (+0.1 m/s, Ibagué 2021)
- 400 metres – 49.80 (Bogotá 2025)
- 800 metres – 2:03.12 (Bucaramanga 2023)
- 100 metres hurdles – 13.79 (+0.6 m/s, Madrid 2020)
- 400 metres hurdles – 57.90 (Cali 2015)
- High jump – 1.77 m (Barranquilla 2018)
- Long jump – 6.58 m (+0.6 m/s, Ibagué 2021)
- Triple jump – 12.13 m (+0.6 m/s, Paipa 2009)
- Shot put – 14.79 m (Cartagena 2019)
- Javelin throw – 48.90 m (Brussels 2017)
- Heptathlon – 6346 pts (Ibagué 2021)
- 4 × 100 metres relay – 44.16 (Geneva 2023)
- 4 × 400 metres relay – 3:29.94 NR (Guadalajara 2011)
- Mixed 4 × 400 metres relay – 3:14.42 AR (Bogotá 2025)
