= Athletics at the 2016 Summer Olympics – Women's heptathlon =

Women's heptathlon at the Games of the XXXI Olympiad
- Venue: Olympic Stadium
- Date: 12–13 August 2016
- Competitors: 31 from 21 nations
- Winning points: 6810 NR

Medalists
| 1st place, gold medalist(s) | | Nafissatou Thiam | Belgium |
| 2nd place, silver medalist(s) | | Jessica Ennis-Hill | Great Britain |
| 3rd place, bronze medalist(s) | | Brianne Theisen-Eaton | Canada |

Video on YouTube Official Video Highlights

The women's heptathlon competition at the 2016 Summer Olympics in Rio de Janeiro, Brazil, was won by Nafissatou Thiam of Belgium. The event was held at the Olympic Stadium on 12–13 August.

== Summary ==
The defending 2012 Olympic champion and the 2015 World Champion, Britain's Jessica Ennis-Hill ranked second on the years rankings with 6733 points. The 2015 World runner-up Brianne Theisen-Eaton of Canada topped the season's lists with 32 points more. Katarina Johnson-Thompson had one of the highest personal best scores, though her fitness for the two-day event was in question, ranking 17th in the world. Other strong entrants included 2016 European Champion Anouk Vetter and world medallist Laura Ikauniece-Admidiņa (ranked third and fourth for the season). While South American Champion Evelis Aguilar from Colombia did not reach the top 10 she improved her personal best in 5 events during the competition.

=== Day one ===
In the first event Ennis-Hill was the expected top finisher with 12.84 seconds (her best in a championship since the London Olympics). Theisen-Eaton was off her best at 13.18 and Johnson-Thompson was a tenth off her own. The top three performers were rounded out by Barbadian Akela Jones (13.00) and Dutchwoman Nadine Visser (13.02).

World heptathlon bests came in the high jump, courtesy of Belgium's Nafissatou Thiam and Johnson-Thompson's clearances of 1.98 m (the latter setting an outright British record). The pair led the rankings after the second event. Jones was short of her best but still cleared 1.89 m to place fourth. Ennis-Hill and Theisen-Eaton performed close to their best and remained in the top five overall.

Despite an elbow injury, Thiam topped the shot put with 14.91 m to take the lead in the third round. Solid marks from Ennis-Hill, Theisen-Eaton and Jones saw them remain in the top five. Her weakest event, Johnson-Thompson slid to out of the lead and into sixth place after a poor 11.68 m. Germany's Carolin Schäfer moved into the top five with a personal best. Barbara Nwaba and Visser placed in the top three of this event but remained outside the top eight.

In the last event of the day, Johnson-Thompson was best in the 200 m, winning in 23.26 seconds to lift herself back to fourth. Ennis-Hill was the next best, moving into the lead as a result, and Thiam was in second after delivering her best first-day performance. Jones and Schäfer made up the top five, while a slow run from Theisen-Eaton saw her drop to sixth.

=== Day two ===
Thiam regained the lead as a result of a 6.58 m personal best in the long jump. Britain's Ennis-Hill and Johnson-Thompson both were a little short of their best with 6.34 m and 6.51 m, respectively, but remained in the top three. Akela Jones stayed in fourth place. Theisen-Eaton scored over 1000 points in the event, but remained nearly 150 points off the lead in fifth. Claudia Rath was the second best performer of the round with 6.55 m but was down the order in 14th.

Despite carrying an elbow injury, Thiam excelled in the javelin with a personal best of 53.13 m. Ennis-Hill remained in second through her throw of 46.06 m, while Theisen-Eaton's 47.36 m put her ahead of fourth-placed Schäfer. A poor throw of 36.36 m pushed Johnson-Thompson out of medal contention. Latvia's Laura Ikauniece-Admidina was the best of the round with 55.93 m, moving into fifth before the final event. Sofía Yfantídou of Greece was the other strong performer of the event with 54.57 m, moving her out of last place.

At the start of the seventh event, Thiam had a 142-point lead worth nearly ten seconds for the 800 m. In the final race, Ennis-Hill took to the front and was on for a personal best at the halfway point, trailed by Theisen-Eaton, Johnson-Thompson and Ikauniece-Admidina. The Briton finished the race in first with 2:09.07 minutes (a season's best). Latvia's Ikauniece-Admidina had a personal best to finish second, but with Theisen-Eaton, close behind, she retained her bronze medal spot. Thiam ran her fifth lifetime best of the competition ended with 2:16.54 minutes. She remained 35 points clear at the top of the leaderboard and won the gold medal in a Belgian national record of 6810 points. Ennis-Hill relinquished her title with a 6775-point silver medal performance while Theisen-Eaton made her first Olympic podium in 6653 points. The standard of the performances in the field was high, with six women going beyond 6500 points in a heptathlon for the first time and best ever score for placings across the field from sixth onwards (bar ninth and twelfth). The event would ultimately prove to be Ennis-Hill's final major competition, as she announced her retirement from athletics two months later.

The medals were presented by Pierre-Olivier Beckers-Vieujant, IOC member, Belgium and Sylvia Barlag, Council Member of the IAAF.

Disqualification
In 2018 Alina Fyodorova was issued with a four-year competition ban backdated to July 2016 for an anti-doping rule violation after testing positive for a banned substance. Consequently, her results from the 2016 Olympic Games in the heptathlon were disqualified.

== Competition format ==
The heptathlon consists of seven track and field events, with a points system that awards higher scores for better results in each of the seven components. The seven event scores are summed to give a total for the heptathlon.

== Records ==
Prior to the competition, the existing World and Olympic records were as follows.

| World record | Jackie Joyner-Kersee (USA) | 7291 pts | Seoul, South Korea | 23–24 September 1988 |
| Olympic record | Jackie Joyner-Kersee (USA) | 7291 pts | Seoul, South Korea | 23–24 September 1988 |
| 2016 World leading | Brianne Theisen Eaton (CAN) | 6765 pts | Götzis, Austria | 29–30 May 2016 |

The following national records were established during the competition:

| Country | Athlete | Points | Notes |
|---|---|---|---|
| Belgium | Nafissatou Thiam (BEL) | 6810 | WL |
| Cuba | Yorgelis Rodríguez (CUB) | 6452 | = |

| Country | Athlete | Event | Height | Notes |
|---|---|---|---|---|
| Great Britain | Katarina Johnson-Thompson (GBR) | High jump | 1.98 m | WHB |

== Schedule ==
All times are Brasilia Time (UTC-3)

| Date | Time | Round |
|---|---|---|
| Friday, 12 August 2016 | 09:35; 10:50; 20:35; 22:05 | 100 metres hurdles High jump Shot put 200 metres |
| Saturday, 13 August 2016 | 11:45; 20:00; 22:50 | Long jump Javelin throw 800 metres |

== Detailed results ==
| KEY: | WHB | World Heptathlon Best | OHB | Olympic Heptathlon Best | NR | National Record | PB | Personal Best | SB | Seasonal Best | DQ | Disqualified | DNS | Did not start | DNF | Did not finish |

=== 100 metres hurdles ===
Wind:
Heat 1: -0.2 m/s, Heat 2: +0.3 m/s, Heat 3: -0.3 m/s, Heat 4: 0.0 m/s

| Rank | Heat | Athlete | Nationality | Result | Points | Notes |
|---|---|---|---|---|---|---|
| 1 | 4 | Jessica Ennis-Hill | Great Britain | 12.84 | 1149 | |
| 2 | 4 | Akela Jones | Barbados | 13.00 | 1124 | |
| 3 | 4 | Nadine Visser | Netherlands | 13.02 | 1121 | |
| 4 | 4 | Kendell Williams | United States | 13.04 | 1118 | |
| 5 | 4 | Carolin Schäfer | Germany | 13.12 | 1106 | PB |
| 6 | 4 | Brianne Theisen Eaton | Canada | 13.18 | 1097 | |
| 7 | 4 | Katerina Cachova | Czech Republic | 13.19 | 1096 | |
| 8 | 2 | Laura Ikauniece-Admidina | Latvia | 13.33 | 1075 | |
| 9 | 4 | Antoinette Nana Djimou | France | 13.37 | 1069 | |
| 10 | 3 | Anouk Vetter | Netherlands | 13.47 | 1055 | |
| 11 | 3 | Katarina Johnson-Thompson | Great Britain | 13.48 | 1053 | |
| 12 | 2 | Nafissatou Thiam | Belgium | 13.56 | 1041 | PB |
| 12 | 2 | Nadine Broersen | Netherlands | 13.56 | 1041 | |
| 12 | 3 | Heather Miller-Koch | United States | 13.56 | 1041 | |
| 15 | 3 | Yorgelis Rodríguez | Cuba | 13.61 | 1034 | |
| 16 | 3 | Claudia Rath | Germany | 13.63 | 1031 | |
| 17 | 3 | Hanna Kasyanova | Ukraine | 13.66 | 1027 | |
| 17 | 3 | Xénia Krizsán | Hungary | 13.66 | 1027 | |
| 19 | 2 | Jennifer Oeser | Germany | 13.69 | 1023 | |
| 20 | 3 | Uhunoma Osazuwa | Nigeria | 13.75 | 1014 | |
| 21 | 1 | Györgyi Zsivoczky-Farkas | Hungary | 13.79 | 1008 | PB |
| 22 | 2 | Barbara Nwaba | United States | 13.81 | 1005 | |
| 23 | 1 | Ivona Dadic | Austria | 13.84 | 1001 | |
| 23 | 1 | Evelis Aguilar | Colombia | 13.84 | 1001 | PB |
| 25 | 2 | Sofia Yfantidou | Greece | 13.99 | 980 | |
| 26 | 1 | Eliska Klucinova | Czech Republic | 14.07 | 968 | |
| 26 | 2 | Alysbeth Felix | Puerto Rico | 14.07 | 968 | |
| 28 | 1 | Vanessa Chefer | Brazil | 14.24 | 945 | |
| 29 | 1 | Ekaterina Voronina | Uzbekistan | 15.21 | 814 | |
| – | 2 | Grit Sadeiko | Estonia | DNF | 0 | |
| DQ | 1 | Alina Fyodorova | Ukraine | ~~14.10~~ | ~~964~~ | |

=== High jump ===
Key

- o = Height cleared
- x = Height failed
- – = Height passed
- r = Retired
- SB = Season's best
- PB = Personal best
- NR = National record
- AR = Area record
- OR = Olympic record
- WR = World record
- WL = World lead
- NM = No mark
- DNS = Did not start
- DQ = Disqualified

| Rank | Group | Name | Nationality | 1.56 | 1.59 | 1.62 | 1.65 | 1.68 | 1.71 | 1.74 | 1.77 | 1.80 | 1.83 | 1.86 | 1.89 | 1.92 | 1.95 | 1.98 | 2.01 | Result | Points | Notes | Overall | Overall rank |
|---|---|---|---|---|---|---|---|---|---|---|---|---|---|---|---|---|---|---|---|---|---|---|---|---|
| 1 | A | Nafissatou Thiam | Belgium | – | – | – | – | – | – | – | – | – | o | o | o | o | xxo | o | xxx | 1.98 | 1211 | WHB, PB | 2252 | 2 |
| 1 | A | Katarina Johnson-Thompson | Great Britain | – | – | – | – | – | – | – | – | o | – | o | o | o | o | xo | xxx | 1.98 | 1211 | WHB, NR | 2264 | 1 |
| 3 | A | Jessica Ennis-Hill | Great Britain | – | – | – | – | – | – | o | o | o | o | xo | xo | xxx | | | | 1.89 | 1093 | SB | 2242 | 3 |
| 3 | A | Akela Jones | Barbados | – | – | – | – | – | o | xo | xxo | xo | xxo | o | xxo | xxx | | | | 1.89 | 1093 | | 2217 | 4 |
| 5 | A | Brianne Theisen Eaton | Canada | – | – | – | – | – | – | o | o | o | xxo | o | xxx | | | | | 1.86 | 1054 | SB | 2151 | 5 |
| 5 | A | Györgyi Zsivoczky-Farkas | Hungary | – | – | – | – | o | o | xo | o | o | xxo | xo | xxx | | | | | 1.86 | 1054 | PB | 2062 | 10 |
| 5 | A | Yorgelis Rodríguez | Cuba | – | – | – | – | – | – | o | – | o | o | xxo | xxx | | | | | 1.86 | 1054 | | 2088 | 8 |
| 5 | B | Jennifer Oeser | Germany | – | – | – | – | – | o | o | o | o | o | xxo | xxx | | | | | 1.86 | 1054 | PB | 2077 | 9 |
| 9 | B | Carolin Schäfer | Germany | – | – | – | – | – | o | o | o | o | o | xxx | | | | | | 1.83 | 1016 | SB | 2122 | 7 |
| 9 | A | Barbara Nwaba | United States | – | – | – | – | – | – | o | o | xo | xo | xxx | | | | | | 1.83 | 1016 | | 2012 | 12 |
| 9 | A | Kendell Williams | United States | – | – | – | – | – | o | o | o | xo | xxo | xxx | | | | | | 1.83 | 1016 | | 2134 | 6 |
| 12 | A | Eliska Klucinova | Czech Republic | – | – | – | – | o | o | o | o | o | xxx | | | | | | | 1.80 | 978 | | 1946 | 22 |
| 12 | A | Alina Fyodorova | Ukraine | – | – | – | – | o | o | o | o | xxo | xxx | | | | | | | 1.80 | 978 | | 1942 | 24 |
| 12 | B | Heather Miller-Koch | United States | – | – | – | xo | o | o | o | o | xxo | xxx | | | | | | | 1.80 | 978 | | 2019 | 13 |
| 15 | A | Katerina Cachova | Czech Republic | – | – | – | – | o | o | o | o | xxx | | | | | | | | 1.77 | 941 | | 2037 | 11 |
| 15 | B | Hanna Kasyanova | Ukraine | – | – | – | – | xo | xo | xxo | o | xxx | | | | | | | | 1.77 | 941 | SB | 1968 | 18 |
| 15 | B | Ivona Dadic | Austria | – | – | – | – | o | o | o | xo | xxx | | | | | | | | 1.77 | 941 | SB | 1942 | 23 |
| 15 | B | Anouk Vetter | Netherlands | – | – | – | xo | o | o | xxo | xo | xxx | | | | | | | | 1.77 | 941 | SB | 1996 | 16 |
| 15 | A | Uhunoma Osazuwa | Nigeria | – | – | – | – | xo | o | o | xxo | xxx | | | | | | | | 1.77 | 941 | | 1955 | 20 |
| 15 | A | Laura Ikauniece-Admidina | Latvia | – | – | – | – | xo | xo | xo | xxo | xxx | | | | | | | | 1.77 | 941 | | 2016 | 14 |
| 15 | B | Xénia Krizsán | Hungary | – | – | – | o | o | o | o | xxo | xxx | | | | | | | | 1.77 | 941 | SB | 1968 | 18 |
| 15 | B | Antoinette Nana Djimou | France | – | – | – | o | o | o | o | xxo | xxx | | | | | | | | 1.77 | 941 | SB | 2010 | 15 |
| 15 | B | Nadine Broersen | Netherlands | – | – | – | – | – | o | xo | xxo | xxx | | | | | | | | 1.77 | 941 | SB | 1982 | 17 |
| 24 | B | Claudia Rath | Germany | – | – | – | o | o | o | o | xxx | | | | | | | | | 1.74 | 903 | | 1934 | 25 |
| 24 | B | Evelis Aguilar | Colombia | xo | – | o | o | o | xo | xo | xxx | | | | | | | | | 1.74 | 903 | PB | 1904 | 26 |
| 26 | A | Alysbeth Felix | Puerto Rico | – | – | – | – | o | xxx | | | | | | | | | | | 1.68 | 830 | | 1798 | 27 |
| 26 | B | Vanessa Chefer | Brazil | – | – | o | o | o | xxx | | | | | | | | | | | 1.68 | 830 | | 1775 | 29 |
| 26 | B | Nadine Visser | Netherlands | – | – | o | o | xxo | xxx | | | | | | | | | | | 1.68 | 830 | | 1951 | 21 |
| 29 | B | Sofia Yfantidou | Greece | o | o | o | o | xxx | | | | | | | | | | | | 1.65 | 795 | SB | 1775 | 28 |
| 29 | B | Ekaterina Voronina | Uzbekistan | – | – | – | xo | – | xr | | | | | | | | | | | 1.65 | 795 | | 1609 | 30 |
| – | B | Grit Sadeiko | Estonia | | | | | | | | | | | | | | | | | NM | 0 | DNS | 0 | – |

=== Shot put ===
| Rank | Group | Name | Nationality | #1 | #2 | #3 | Result | Points | Notes | Overall | Overall rank |
|---|---|---|---|---|---|---|---|---|---|---|---|
| 1 | B | Nafissatou Thiam | Belgium | 14.41 | 13.30 | 14.91 | 14.91 | 855 | | 3107 | 1 |
| 2 | B | Antoinette Nana Djimou Ida | France | 14.88 | 14.75 | 14.74 | 14.88 | 853 | | 2863 | 10 |
| 3 | A | Barbara Nwaba | United States | 13.59 | 13.96 | 14.81 | 14.81 | 848 | | 2869 | 9 |
| 4 | A | Anouk Vetter | Netherlands | 14.78 | x | 14.41 | 14.78 | 846 | | 2842 | 12 |
| 5 | B | Carolin Schäfer | Germany | 13.83 | 13.86 | 14.57 | 14.57 | 832 | PB | 2954 | 4 |
| 6 | B | Eliska Klucinova | Czech Republic | 14.41 | x | x | 14.41 | 821 | | 2767 | 15 |
| 7 | A | Györgyi Zsivoczky-Farkas | Hungary | 14.39 | x | 13.95 | 14.39 | 820 | | 2882 | 8 |
| 8 | B | Jennifer Oeser | Germany | 14.28 | 13.67 | 13.91 | 14.28 | 813 | SB | 2890 | 7 |
| 9 | A | Akela Jones | Barbados | 13.31 | 14.09 | 12.34 | 14.09 | 800 | | 3017 | 3 |
| 10 | A | Nadine Broersen | Netherlands | 13.84 | x | 14.04 | 14.04 | 797 | | 2779 | 13 |
| 11 | B | Jessica Ennis-Hill | Great Britain | 13.44 | 13.34 | 13.86 | 13.86 | 785 | | 3027 | 2 |
| 12 | B | Xénia Krizsán | Hungary | 13.14 | 13.65 | 13.78 | 13.78 | 779 | | 2747 | 17 |
| 13 | B | Yorgelis Rodríguez | Cuba | 12.58 | 13.69 | x | 13.69 | 773 | | 2861 | 11 |
| 14 | A | Evelis Aguilar | Colombia | 11.66 | 13.60 | 12.23 | 13.60 | 767 | PB | 2671 | 24 |
| 15 | B | Laura Ikauniece-Admidina | Latvia | 13.52 | 13.38 | 13.15 | 13.52 | 762 | | 2778 | 14 |
| 16 | A | Brianne Theisen Eaton | Canada | 13.36 | 13.45 | 13.36 | 13.45 | 757 | | 2908 | 5 |
| 17 | A | Ivona Dadic | Austria | 13.09 | 13.43 | x | 13.43 | 756 | | 2698 | 22 |
| 18 | B | Hanna Kasyanova | Ukraine | 12.73 | 12.43 | 13.25 | 13.25 | 744 | | 2712 | 21 |
| 19 | B | Uhunoma Osazuwa | Nigeria | 11.67 | 12.86 | 13.15 | 13.15 | 737 | PB | 2692 | 23 |
| 20 | A | Vanessa Chefer | Brazil | 13.04 | x | 13.06 | 13.06 | 731 | | 2506 | 27 |
| 21 | B | Sofia Yfantidou | Greece | x | 12.97 | 12.75 | 12.97 | 725 | | 2500 | 28 |
| 22 | A | Heather Miller-Koch | United States | 12.45 | 12.91 | 12.91 | 12.91 | 721 | | 2740 | 19 |
| 23 | B | Nadine Visser | Netherlands | 12.31 | 12.84 | 12.11 | 12.84 | 717 | SB | 2668 | 25 |
| 24 | A | Claudia Rath | Germany | 12.83 | 12.54 | 12.76 | 12.83 | 716 | | 2650 | 26 |
| 25 | A | Katerina Cachova | Czech Republic | 11.58 | 11.95 | 12.38 | 12.38 | 686 | | 2723 | 20 |
| 26 | A | Katarina Johnson-Thompson | Great Britain | x | 11.68 | 11.19 | 11.68 | 640 | | 2904 | 6 |
| 27 | A | Alysbeth Felix | Puerto Rico | 11.36 | 10.84 | 10.88 | 11.36 | 619 | | 2417 | 29 |
| 28 | B | Kendell Williams | United States | 11.21 | x | x | 11.21 | 609 | | 2743 | 18 |
| – | B | Ekaterina Voronina | Uzbekistan | | | | NM | 0 | DNS | 1609 | 30 |
| – | A | Grit Sadeiko | Estonia | | | | NM | 0 | DNS | 0 | – |
| DQ | A | Alina Fodorova | Ukraine | ~~x~~ | ~~x~~ | ~~14.38~~ | ~~14.38~~ | ~~820~~ | | ~~2761~~ | ~~16~~ |

=== 200 metres ===
Wind: -0.7, +0.4, +0.0, -0.1 m/s.

| Rank | Heat | Athlete | Nationality | Result | Points | Notes | Overall | Overall rank |
|---|---|---|---|---|---|---|---|---|
| 1 | 4 | Katarina Johnson-Thompson | Great Britain | 23.26 | 1053 | | 3957 | 4 |
| 2 | 4 | Jessica Ennis-Hill | Great Britain | 23.49 | 1030 | | 4057 | 1 |
| 3 | 4 | Laura Ikauniece-Admidina | Latvia | 23.76 | 1004 | | 3782 | 9 |
| 4 | 3 | Anouk Vetter | Netherlands | 23.93 | 987 | | 3829 | 7 |
| 5 | 4 | Carolin Schäfer | Germany | 23.99 | 982 | | 3936 | 5 |
| 6 | 4 | Kendell Williams | United States | 24.09 | 972 | | 3715 | 14 |
| 7 | 2 | Vanessa Chefer | Brazil | 24.11 | 970 | SB | 3476 | 27 |
| 8 | 4 | Evelis Aguilar | Colombia | 24.12 | 969 | | 3640 | 17 |
| 9 | 4 | Brianne Theisen Eaton | Canada | 24.18 | 963 | | 3871 | 6 |
| 10 | 3 | Yorgelis Rodríguez | Cuba | 24.26 | 956 | | 3817 | 8 |
| 11 | 3 | Kateřina Cachová | Czech Republic | 24.32 | 950 | | 3673 | 15 |
| 12 | 1 | Nadine Visser | Netherlands | 24.34 | 948 | | 3616 | 22 |
| 13 | 4 | Akela Jones | Barbados | 24.35 | 947 | | 3964 | 3 |
| 14 | 3 | Claudia Rath | Germany | 24.48 | 935 | | 3585 | 26 |
| 15 | 3 | Ivona Dadic | Austria | 24.60 | 924 | | 3622 | 20 |
| 15 | 2 | Hanna Kasyanova | Ukraine | 24.60 | 924 | SB | 3636 | 18 |
| 17 | 3 | Uhunoma Osazuwa | Nigeria | 24.67 | 917 | | 3609 | 24 |
| 18 | 2 | Alysbeth Felix | Puerto Rico | 24.74 | 911 | | 3328 | 28 |
| 19 | 3 | Barbara Nwaba | United States | 24.77 | 908 | | 3777 | 11 |
| 20 | 1 | Nadine Broersen | Netherlands | 24.94 | 892 | SB | 3671 | 16 |
| 21 | 3 | Heather Miller-Koch | United States | 24.97 | 890 | | 3630 | 19 |
| 22 | 2 | Jennifer Oeser | Germany | 24.99 | 888 | | 3778 | 10 |
| 23 | 2 | Antoinette Nana Djimou Ida | France | 25.07 | 880 | | 3743 | 12 |
| 24 | 1 | Nafissatou Thiam | Belgium | 25.10 | 878 | | 3985 | 2 |
| 25 | 2 | Xénia Krizsán | Hungary | 25.24 | 865 | | 3612 | 23 |
| 26 | 2 | Eliška Klučinová | Czech Republic | 25.37 | 853 | | 3620 | 21 |
| 27 | 1 | Györgyi Zsivoczky-Farkas | Hungary | 25.38 | 852 | SB | 3734 | 13 |
| 28 | 1 | Sofia Yfantidou | Greece | 26.32 | 769 | | 3269 | 29 |
| – | — | Ekaterina Voronina | Uzbekistan | DNS | 0 | | 1609 | 30 |
| – | — | Grit Sadeiko | Estonia | DNS | 0 | | 0 | – |
| DQ | 1 | Alina Fodorova | Ukraine | ~~25.44~~ | ~~847~~ | | ~~3608~~ | ~~25~~ |

=== Long jump ===
| Rank | Group | Name | Nationality | #1 | #2 | #3 | Result | Points | Notes | Overall | Overall rank |
|---|---|---|---|---|---|---|---|---|---|---|---|
| 1 | A | Nafissatou Thiam | Belgium | x | 6.18 | 6.58 | 6.58 | 1033 | PB | 5018 | 1 |
| 2 | B | Claudia Rath | Germany | 6.39 | 6.52 | 6.55 | 6.55 | 1023 | | 4608 | 14 |
| 3 | B | Katarina Johnson-Thompson | Great Britain | 6.51 | x | 6.47 | 6.51 | 1010 | | 4967 | 3 |
| 4 | B | Brianne Theisen Eaton | Canada | x | 6.48 | 6.35 | 6.48 | 1001 | | 4872 | 5 |
| 5 | B | Antoinette Nana Djimou Ida | France | 6.32 | 6.17 | 6.43 | 6.43 | 985 | SB | 4728 | 8 |
| 6 | B | Nadine Visser | Netherlands | 6.05 | 6.35 | 6.03 | 6.35 | 959 | | 4575 | 15 |
| 7 | A | Jessica Ennis-Hill | Great Britain | 6.34 | 6.29 | 6.03 | 6.34 | 956 | | 5013 | 2 |
| 8 | A | Kendell Williams | United States | x | 6.31 | 6.30 | 6.31 | 946 | | 4661 | 13 |
| 8 | B | Györgyi Zsivoczky-Farkas | Hungary | 5.99 | 6.31 | x | 6.31 | 946 | SB | 4680 | 11 |
| 10 | A | Akela Jones | Barbados | 6.20 | 6.26 | 6.30 | 6.30 | 943 | | 4907 | 4 |
| 11 | A | Yorgelis Rodríguez | Cuba | x | 6.25 | 5.87 | 6.25 | 927 | SB | 4744 | 7 |
| 12 | A | Evelis Aguilar | Colombia | 6.04 | 6.23 | x | 6.23 | 921 | PB | 4561 | 18 |
| 13 | A | Alysbeth Felix | Puerto Rico | 5.38 | 6.01 | 6.22 | 6.22 | 918 | | 4246 | 28 |
| 14 | B | Carolin Schäfer | Germany | 6.20 | x | x | 6.20 | 912 | | 4848 | 6 |
| 15 | A | Jennifer Oeser | Germany | 5.99 | x | 6.19 | 6.19 | 908 | SB | 4686 | 10 |
| 16 | A | Heather Miller-Koch | United States | 6.16 | x | x | 6.16 | 899 | | 4529 | 19 |
| 17 | A | Nadine Broersen | Netherlands | 6.15 | x | 6.04 | 6.15 | 896 | SB | 4567 | 17 |
| 18 | B | Laura Ikauniece-Admidina | Latvia | x | 6.12 | 6.07 | 6.12 | 887 | | 4669 | 12 |
| 19 | A | Anouk Vetter | Netherlands | 6.03 | 6.10 | 5.94 | 6.10 | 880 | | 4709 | 9 |
| 19 | B | Vanessa Chefer | Brazil | 5.89 | 5.94 | 6.10 | 6.10 | 880 | | 4356 | 27 |
| 21 | A | Xénia Krizsán | Hungary | 6.02 | 6.08 | x | 6.08 | 874 | | 4486 | 23 |
| 21 | B | Eliška Klučinová | Czech Republic | 6.08 | x | x | 6.08 | 874 | | 4494 | 21 |
| 23 | B | Ivona Dadic | Austria | 5.98 | 6.05 | 6.05 | 6.05 | 865 | | 4487 | 22 |
| 24 | A | Kateřina Cachová | Czech Republic | x | 5.91 | 5.90 | 5.91 | 822 | | 4495 | 20 |
| 25 | B | Hanna Kasyanova | Ukraine | 5.88 | x | 5.88 | 5.88 | 813 | | 4449 | 25 |
| 26 | B | Barbara Nwaba | United States | x | x | 5.81 | 5.81 | 792 | | 4569 | 16 |
| 27 | B | Uhunoma Osazuwa | Nigeria | 5.53 | 5.72 | 5.61 | 5.72 | 765 | | 4374 | 26 |
| 28 | B | Sofia Yfantidou | Greece | x | x | 5.51 | 5.51 | 703 | | 3972 | 29 |
| – | — | Ekaterina Voronina | Uzbekistan | – | – | – | NM | 0 | | 1609 | 30 |
| – | — | Grit Sadeiko | Estonia | – | – | – | NM | 0 | | 0 | – |
| DQ | A | Alina Fodorova | Ukraine | ~~6.00~~ | ~~5.96~~ | ~~4.35~~ | ~~6.00~~ | ~~850~~ | | ~~4458~~ | ~~24~~ |

=== Javelin throw ===
| Rank | Group | Name | Nationality | #1 | #2 | #3 | Result | Points | Notes | Overall | Overall rank |
|---|---|---|---|---|---|---|---|---|---|---|---|
| 1 | B | Laura Ikauniece-Admidina | Latvia | 50.74 | 55.91 | 55.93 | 55.93 | 975 | PB | 5644 | 5 |
| 2 | B | Sofia Yfantidou | Greece | 48.52 | 51.15 | 54.57 | 54.57 | 949 | | 4921 | 27 |
| 3 | B | Nafissatou Thiam | Belgium | 53.13 | x | 46.37 | 53.13 | 921 | PB | 5939 | 1 |
| 4 | B | Nadine Broersen | Netherlands | 47.92.16 | 50.77 | 50.80 | 50.80 | 876 | | 5443 | 13 |
| 5 | B | Xénia Krizsán | Hungary | 48.027 | 49.53 | 49.78 | 49.78 | 856 | SB | 5342 | 17 |
| 6 | A | Yorgelis Rodríguez | Cuba | 48.89 | 43.77 | x | 48.89 | 839 | PB | 5583 | 7 |
| 7 | B | Antoinette Nana Djimou Ida | France | 48.28 | 48.76 | x | 48.76 | 836 | | 5564 | 9 |
| 8 | B | Anouk Vetter | Netherlands | 43.34 | 48.42 | x | 48.42 | 830 | | 5539 | 10 |
| 9 | A | Györgyi Zsivoczky-Farkas | Hungary | 48.07 | 45.01 | 46.04 | 48.07 | 823 | SB | 5503 | 11 |
| 10 | B | Carolin Schäfer | Germany | 47.36 | 47.99 | x | 47.99 | 821 | | 5669 | 4 |
| 11 | B | Brianne Theisen Eaton | Canada | 47.36 | 45.94 | 43.86 | 47.36 | 809 | | 5681 | 3 |
| 12 | B | Jennifer Oeser | Germany | 47.22 | 46.11 | 46.52 | 47.22 | 806 | | 5492 | 12 |
| 13 | A | Evelis Aguilar | Colombia | 46.90 | 40.40 | 40.20 | 46.90 | 800 | PB | 5362 | 15 |
| 14 | B | Barbara Nwaba | United States | 46.85 | 42.58 | x | 46.85 | 799 | | 5368 | 14 |
| 15 | A | Eliska Klucinova | Czech Republic | 45.93 | 42.04 | 46.73 | 46.73 | 797 | SB | 5291 | 18 |
| 16 | B | Ivona Dadic | Austria | 45.39 | 46.08 | 43.01 | 46.08 | 784 | | 5271 | 20 |
| 17 | B | Jessica Ennis-Hill | Great Britain | 45.91 | 46.06 | 42.17 | 46.06 | 784 | | 5797 | 2 |
| 18 | B | Vanessa Chefer | Brazil | 45.05 | x | 42.87 | 45.05 | 764 | | 5120 | 23 |
| 19 | A | Nadine Visser | Netherlands | 37.66 | 42.48 | 40.49 | 42.48 | 715 | SB | 5290 | 19 |
| 20 | A | Akela Jones | Barbados | 40.93 | 34.75 | 42.00 | 42.00 | 706 | PB | 5613 | 6 |
| 21 | A | Kendell Williams | United States | 38.85 | 40.93 | 38.43 | 40.93 | 685 | | 5346 | 16 |
| 22 | A | Heather Miller-Koch | United States | 40.16 | 40.25 | x | 40.25 | 672 | | 5201 | 22 |
| 23 | A | Alysbeth Felix | Puerto Rico | 36.83 | 39.69 | 40.17 | 40.17 | 671 | PB | 4917 | 28 |
| 24 | A | Claudia Rath | Germany | 36.20 | 39.39 | x | 39.39 | 656 | | 5264 | 21 |
| 25 | B | Hanna Kasyanova | Ukraine | x | x | 39.10 | 39.10 | 631 | | 5080 | 25 |
| 26 | A | Katerina Cachova | Czech Republic | 37.77 | 35.84 | 36.95 | 37.77 | 625 | | 5120 | 24 |
| 27 | A | Katarina Johnson-Thompson | Great Britain | 36.36 | x | 33.42 | 36.36 | 598 | | 5565 | 8 |
| 28 | A | Uhunoma Osazuwa | Nigeria | 33.42 | 33.41 | 30.20 | 33.42 | 542 | | 4916 | 29 |
| – | — | Ekaterina Voronina | Uzbekistan | – | – | – | NM | 0 | DNS | 1609 | 30 |
| – | — | Grit Sadeiko | Estonia | – | – | – | NM | 0 | DNS | 0 | – |
| DQ | A | Alina Fodorova | Ukraine | ~~35.44~~ | ~~35.20~~ | ~~28.97~~ | ~~35.44~~ | ~~580~~ | ~~SB~~ | ~~5038~~ | ~~26~~ |

=== 800 metres ===
| Rank | Heat | Athlete | Nationality | Result | Points | Notes |
|---|---|---|---|---|---|---|
| 1 | 1 | Heather Miller-Koch | United States | 2:06.82 | 1012 | PB |
| 2 | 1 | Claudia Rath | Germany | 2:07.22 | 1006 | SB |
| 3 | 3 | Jessica Ennis-Hill | Great Britain | 2:09.07 | 978 | SB |
| 4 | 3 | Laura Ikauniece-Admidina | Latvia | 2:09.43 | 973 | PB |
| 5 | 3 | Brianne Theisen Eaton | Canada | 2:09.50 | 972 | SB |
| 6 | 3 | Katarina Johnson-Thompson | Great Britain | 2:10.47 | 958 | SB |
| 7 | 2 | Barbara Nwaba | United States | 2:11.61 | 941 | |
| 8 | 2 | Györgyi Zsivoczky-Farkas | Hungary | 2:11.76 | 939 | PB |
| 9 | 2 | Xénia Krizsán | Hungary | 2:13.46 | 915 | PB |
| 10 | 2 | Jennifer Oeser | Germany | 2:13.82 | 909 | SB |
| 11 | 1 | Vanessa Chefer | Brazil | 2:14.20 | 904 | SB |
| 12 | 2 | Evelis Aguilar | Colombia | 2:14.32 | 902 | |
| 13 | 2 | Nadine Visser | Netherlands | 2:14.47 | 900 | |
| 14 | 3 | Yorgelis Rodríguez | Cuba | 2:14.65 | 898 | PB |
| 15 | 1 | Alysbeth Felix | Puerto Rico | 2:15.32 | 888 | |
| 16 | 1 | Ivona Dadic | Austria | 2:15.64 | 884 | |
| 17 | 2 | Kendell Williams | United States | 2:16.24 | 875 | |
| 18 | 3 | Carolin Schäfer | Germany | 2:16.52 | 871 | SB |
| 19 | 3 | Nafissatou Thiam | Belgium | 2:16.54 | 871 | PB |
| 20 | 1 | Hanna Kasyanova | Ukraine | 2:16.58 | 871 | SB |
| 21 | 2 | Nadine Broersen | Netherlands | 2:17.55 | 857 | |
| 22 | 2 | Anouk Vetter | Netherlands | 2:17.71 | 855 | PB |
| 23 | 1 | Katerina Cachova | Czech Republic | 2:18.95 | 838 | |
| 24 | 3 | Antoinette Nana Djimou Ida | France | 2:20.36 | 819 | |
| 25 | 2 | Eliska Klucinova | Czech Republic | 2:22.81 | 786 | |
| 26 | 1 | Sofia Yfantidou | Greece | 2:30.08 | 692 | |
| 27 | 3 | Akela Jones | Barbados | 2:41.12 | 560 | |
| – | 1 | Uhunoma Osazuwa | Nigeria | — | 0 | DQ |
| – | — | Ekaterina Voronina | Uzbekistan | — | 0 | DNS |
| – | — | Grit Sadeiko | Estonia | — | 0 | DNS |
| DQ | 1 | Alina Fodorova | Ukraine | — | ~~0~~ | ~~DNF~~ |

== Overall results ==
The final results of the event are in the following table.

Key

♦ The highest mark recorded in each event is highlighted in yellow with a diamond symbol.

| Rank | Athlete | Points | 100 h | HJ | SP | 200 m | LJ | JT | 800 m |
|---|---|---|---|---|---|---|---|---|---|
| 1st place, gold medalist(s) | Nafissatou Thiam (BEL) | 6810 (NR, WL) | 1041; 13.56 s | 1211; 1.98 m^{♦} | 855; 14.91 m^{♦} | 878; 25.10 s | 1033; 6.58 m^{♦} | 921; 53.13 m | 871; 2:16.54 |
| 2nd place, silver medalist(s) | Jessica Ennis-Hill (GBR) | 6775 (SB) | 1149; 12.84 s^{♦} | 1093; 1.89 m | 785; 13.86 m | 1030; 23.49 s | 956; 6.34 m | 784; 46.06 m | 978; 2:09.07 |
| 3rd place, bronze medalist(s) | Brianne Theisen Eaton (CAN) | 6653 | 1097; 13.18 s | 1054; 1.86 m | 757; 13.45 m | 963; 24.18 s | 1001; 6.48 m | 809; 47.36 m | 972; 2:09.50 |
| 4 | Laura Ikauniece-Admidina (LAT) | 6617 | 1075; 13.33 s | 941; 1.77 m | 762; 13.52 m | 1004; 23.76 s | 887; 6.12 m | 975; 55.93 m^{♦} | 973; 2:09.43 |
| 5 | Carolin Schäfer (GER) | 6540 | 1106; 13.12 s | 1016; 1.83 m | 832; 14.57 m | 982; 23.99 s | 912; 6.20 m | 821; 47.99 m | 871; 2:16.52 |
| 6 | Katarina Johnson-Thompson (GBR) | 6523 (SB) | 1053; 13.48 s | 1211; 1.98 m^{♦} | 640; 11.68 m | 1053; 23.26 s^{♦} | 1010; 6.51 m | 598; 36.36 m | 958; 2:10.47 |
| 7 | Yorgelis Rodríguez (CUB) | 6481 (NR) | 1034; 13.61 s | 1054; 1.86 m | 773; 13.69 m | 956; 24.26 s | 927; 6.25 m | 839; 48.89 m | 898; 2:14.65 |
| 8 | Györgyi Zsivoczky-Farkas (HUN) | 6442 (PB) | 1008; 13.79 s | 1054; 1.86 m | 820; 14.39 m | 852; 25.38 s | 946; 6.31 m | 823; 48.07 m | 939; 2:11.76 |
| 9 | Jennifer Oeser (GER) | 6401 (SB) | 1023; 13.69 s | 1054; 1.86 m | 813; 14.28 m | 888; 24.99 s | 908; 6.19 m | 806; 47.22 m | 909; 2:13.82 |
| 10 | Anouk Vetter (NED) | 6394 | 1055; 13.47 s | 941; 1.77 m | 846; 14.78 m | 987; 23.93 s | 880; 6.10 m | 830; 48.42 m | 855; 2:17.71 |
| 11 | Antoinette Nana Djimou Ida (FRA) | 6383 | 1069; 13.37 s | 941; 1.77 m | 853; 14.88 m | 880; 25.07 s | 985; 6.43 m | 836; 48.76 m | 819; 2:20.36 |
| 12 | Barbara Nwaba (USA) | 6309 | 1005; 13.81 s | 1016; 1.83 m | 848; 14.81 m | 908; 24.77 s | 792; 5.81 m | 799; 46.85 m | 941; 2:11.61 |
| 13 | Nadine Broersen (NED) | 6300 | 1041; 13.56 s | 941; 1.77 m | 797; 14.04 m | 892; 24.94 s | 896; 6.15 m | 876; 50.80 m | 857; 2:17.55 |
| 14 | Claudia Rath (GER) | 6270 | 1031; 13.63 s | 903; 1.74 m | 716; 12.83 m | 935; 24.48 s | 1023; 6.55 m | 656; 39.39 m | 1006; 2:07.22 |
| 15 | Evelis Aguilar (COL) | 6263 | 1001; 13.84 s | 903; 1.74 m | 767; 13.60 m | 969; 24.12 s | 921; 6.23 m | 800; 46.90 m | 902; 2:14.32 |
| 16 | Xénia Krizsán (HUN) | 6257 | 1027; 13.66 s | 941; 1.77 m | 779; 13.78 m | 865; 25.24 s | 874; 6.08 m | 856; 49.78 m | 915; 2:13.46 |
| 17 | Kendell Williams (USA) | 6221 | 1118; 13.04 s | 1016; 1.83 m | 609; 11.21 m | 972; 24.09 s | 946; 6.31 m | 685; 40.93 m | 875; 2:16.24 |
| 18 | Heather Miller-Koch (USA) | 6213 | 1041; 13.56 s | 978; 1.80 m | 721; 12.91 m | 890; 24.97 s | 899; 6.16 m | 672; 40.25 m | 1012; 2:06.82^{♦} |
| 19 | Nadine Visser (NED) | 6190 | 1121; 13.02 s | 830; 1.68 m | 717; 12.84 m | 948; 24.34 s | 959; 6.35 m | 715; 42.48 m | 900; 2:14.47 |
| 20 | Akela Jones (BAR) | 6173 | 1124; 13.00 s | 1093; 1.89 m | 800; 14.09 m | 947; 24.35 s | 943; 6.30 m | 706; 42.00 m | 560; 2:41.12 |
| 21 | Ivona Dadic (AUT) | 6155 | 1001; 13.84 s | 941; 1.77 m | 756; 13.43 m | 924; 24.60 s | 865; 6.05 m | 784; 46.08 m | 884; 2:15.64 |
| 22 | Eliska Klucinova (CZE) | 6077 | 968; 14.07 s | 978; 1.80 m | 821; 14.41 m | 853; 25.37 s | 874; 6.08 m | 797; 46.73 m | 786; 2:22.81 |
| 23 | Vanessa Chefer (BRA) | 6024 | 945; 14.24 s | 830; 1.68 m | 731; 13.06 m | 970; 24.11 s | 880; 6.10 m | 764; 45.05 m | 904; 2:14.20 |
| 24 | Katerina Cachova (CZE) | 5958 | 1096; 13.19 s | 941; 1.77 m | 686; 12.38 m | 950; 24.32 s | 822; 5.91 m | 625; 37.77 m | 838; 2:18.95 |
| 25 | Hanna Kasyanova (UKR) | 5951 | 1027; 13.66 s | 941; 1.77 m | 744; 13.25 m | 924; 24.60 s | 813; 5.88 m | 631; 38.10 m | 871; 2:16.58 |
| 26 | Alysbeth Felix (PUR) | 5805 | 968; 14.07 s | 830; 1.68 m | 619; 11.36 m | 911; 24.74 s | 918; 6.22 m | 671; 40.17 m | 888; 2:15.32 |
| 27 | Sofia Yfantidou (GRE) | 5613 | 980; 13.99 s | 795; 1.65 m | 725; 12.97 m | 769; 26.32 s | 703; 5.51 m | 949; 54.57 m | 692; 2:30.08 |
| 28 | Alina Fodorova (UKR) | 5038 | 964; 14.10 s | 978; 1.80 m | 819; 14.38 m | 847; 25.4 s | 850; 6.00 m | 580; 35.44 m | 0 DNF |
| 29 | Uhunoma Osazuwa (NGR) | 4916 | 1014; 13.75 s | 941; 1.77 m | 737; 13.15 m | 917; 24.67 s | 765; 5.72 m | 542; 33.42 m | 0 DQ |
| – | Ekaterina Voronina (UZB) | 1609* | 814; 15.21 s | 795; 1.65 m | Did not participate | | | | |
| – | Grit Sadeiko (EST) | DNF | 0 DNF | Did not participate | | | | | |

* – Ekaterina Voronina retired during the high jump and did not participate in the remaining events.
