= Alysbeth Félix =

Puerto Rican Olympic athlete

Alysbeth Félix Boyer
Personal information
- Born: March 7, 1993 (age 33) San Juan, Puerto Rico
- Height: 1.70 m (5 ft 7 in)
- Weight: 57 kg (126 lb)

Sport
- Country: Puerto Rico
- Sport: Athletics
- Events: Heptathlon, Long jump
- Coached by: Ubaldo Duany
Medal record
Women's athletics
Representing Puerto Rico
NACAC Championships
Silver medal – second place	2025 Freeport	Long jump
Pan American Games
Silver medal – second place	2023 Santiago	Heptathlon
Pan American Championships
Gold medal – first place	2026 Medellín	Long jump
Ibero-American Championships
Gold medal – first place	2016 Rio de Janeiro	Heptathlon
Central American and Caribbean Games
Bronze medal – third place	2018 Barranquilla	Long jump

Alysbeth Félix Boyer (born March 7, 1993) is a Puerto Rican athlete competing in the heptathlon. Earlier in her career she specialised in the high jump and long jump.

== Competition record ==
Year	Competition	Venue	Position	Event	Notes
Representing Puerto Rico
2010	Central American and Caribbean; Junior Championships (U20)	San Salvador, El Salvador	2nd	High jump	1.73 m
2010	Central American and Caribbean Games	Mayagüez, Puerto Rico	8th	High jump	1.70 m
2011	Central American and Caribbean Championships	Mayagüez, Puerto Rico	5th	High jump	1.70 m
2012	Central American and Caribbean; Junior Championships (U20)	San Salvador, El Salvador	2nd	Long jump	5.53 m
2013	Central American and Caribbean Championships	Morelia, Mexico	5th	Heptathlon	5065 pts
2014	Ibero-American Championships	São Paulo, Brazil	2nd	Heptathlon	5578 pts
2014	Central American and Caribbean Games	Xalapa, Mexico	3rd	Heptathlon	5721 pts
2015	NACAC Championships	San José, Costa Rica	5th	Long jump	6.34 m (w)
2015	Pan American Games	Toronto, Canada	7th	Heptathlon	5810 pts
2016	Ibero-American Championships	Rio de Janeiro, Brazil	1st	Heptathlon	5910 pts
2016	Olympic Games	Rio de Janeiro, Brazil	26th	Heptathlon	5805 pts
2017	World Championships	London, United Kingdom	25th	Heptathlon	5584 pts
2018	Central American and Caribbean Games	Barranquilla, Colombia	3rd	Long jump	6.45 m (w)
2018	Central American and Caribbean Games	Barranquilla, Colombia	5th	Heptathlon	5655 pts
2018	NACAC Championships	Toronto, Canada	7th	Long jump	6.04 m
2019	Pan American Games	Lima, Peru	6th	Heptathlon	5818 pts
2022	Ibero-American Championships	La Nucía, Spain	3rd	Heptathlon	5666 pts
2023	Central American and Caribbean Games	San Salvador, El Salvador	3rd	Long jump	6.44 m
2023	Central American and Caribbean Games	San Salvador, El Salvador	3rd	Heptathlon	5860 pts
2023	Pan American Games	Santiago, Chile	2nd	Heptathlon	5665 pts
2024	Ibero-American Championships	Cuiabá, Brazil	6th	Long jump	6.17 m
2025	NACAC Championships	Freeport, Bahamas	2nd	Long jump	6.64 m
2025	World Championships	Tokyo, Japan	13th (q)	Long jump	6.58 m
2026	South American Indoor Championships	Cochabamba, Bolivia	3rd^{1}	Long jump	6.64 m
2026	World Indoor Championships	Toruń, Poland	14th	Long jump	6.37 m
2026	Pan American Championships	Medellín, Colombia	1st	Long Junp	6.64 m
2026	Central American and Caribbean Games	Santo Domingo, Dominican Republic	1st	Long jump	6.54 m
2026	Central American and Caribbean Games	Santo Domingo, Dominican Republic	1st	Heptathlon	6136 pts

^{1}Out of competition performance

== Personal bests ==
Outdoor

- 200 metres – 24.37 (-2.7 m/s, Medellín 2015)
- 800 metres – 2:16.04 (Rio de Janeiro 2016)
- 100 metres hurdles – 13.53 (+1.7 m/s, Medellín 2016)
- High jump – 1.81 (Medellín 2016)
- Long jump – 6.58 (Slovakia 2025)
- Triple jump – 12.39 (+0.6 m/s, Ponce 2014)
- Shot put – 11.35 (Rio de Janeiro 2016)
- Javelin throw – 39.38 (Toronto 2015)
- Heptathlon – 5910 (Rio de Janeiro 2016)
