= Athletics at the 2011 Pan American Games – Women's 4 × 400 metres relay =

Women's 4 × 400 metres relay at the 2011 Pan American Games
- Venue: Telmex Athletics Stadium
- Dates: October 28
- Competitors: 24 from 8 nations

Medalists
Gold medal	Aymée Martínez, Diosmely Peña, Susana Clement, Daisurami Bonne	Cuba
Silver medal	Joelma Sousa, Geisa Coutinho, Bárbara de Oliveira, Jailma de Lima	Brazil
Bronze medal	Princesa Oliveros, Norma González, Evelis Aguilar, Jennifer Padilla	Colombia

The women's 4 × 400 metres relay competition of the athletics events at the 2011 Pan American Games took place on 28 October at the Telmex Athletics Stadium. The defending Pan American Games champion were Aymée Martínez, Daimy Pernia, Zulia Calatayud and Indira Terrero of Cuba.

== Records ==
Prior to this competition, the existing world and Pan American Games records were as follows:

World record	Soviet Union	3:15.17	Seoul, South Korea	October 1, 1988
Pan American Games record	United States	3:23.35	Indianapolis, United States	August 16, 1987

== Qualification ==
Each National Olympic Committee (NOC) was able to enter one team.

== Schedule ==
Date	Time	Round
October 28, 2011	18:25	Final

== Results ==
All times shown are in seconds.

KEY:	q	Fastest non-qualifiers	Q	Qualified	NR	National record	PB	Personal best	SB	Seasonal best	DQ	Disqualified

=== Final ===
Held on October 28.

Rank	Nation	Athletes	Time	Notes
1st place, gold medalist(s)	Cuba	Aymée Martínez, Diosmely Peña, Susana Clement, Daisurami Bonne	3:28.09	
2nd place, silver medalist(s)	Brazil	Joelma Sousa, Geisa Coutinho, Bárbara de Oliveira, Jailma de Lima	3:29.59	
3rd place, bronze medalist(s)	Colombia	Princesa Oliveros, Norma González, Evelis Aguilar, Jennifer Padilla	3:29.94	NR
4	United States	Ciara Short, Leslie Cole, Takecia Jameson, Mackenzie Hill	3:33.42	
5	Mexico	Karla Saviñón, Gabriela Medina, Nallely Vela, Zudikey Rodriguez	3:40.07	
6	Ecuador	Pamela Chalá, Celene Cevallos, Erika Chávez, Lucy Jaramillo	3:45.59	
	Dominican Republic		DNS	
	Jamaica		DNS	
