= Athletics at the 2023 Pan American Games – Women's heptathlon =

Women's heptathlon at the 2023 Pan American Games
- Venue: Athletics Stadium
- Dates: November 1 – November 2
- Competitors: 9 from 7 nations
- Winning points: 6113

Medalists
Gold medal	Erin Marsh	United States
Silver medal	Alysbeth Félix	Puerto Rico
Bronze medal	Jordan Gray	United States

The women's heptathlon competition of the athletics events at the 2023 Pan American Games took place on November 1 and 2 at the Julio Martínez National Stadium of Santiago, Chile.

== Records ==
Prior to this competition, the existing world and Pan American Games records were as follows:

World record	Jackie Joyner-Kersee (USA)	7291	Seoul, South Korea	September 24, 1988
Pan American Games record	Yorgelis Rodríguez (CUB)	6332	Toronto, Canada	July 25, 2015

== Schedule ==
Date	Time	Round
November 1, 2023	17:15	100 metres hurdles
November 1, 2023	18:08	High jump
November 1, 2023	20:00	Shot put
November 1, 2023	20:52	200 metres
November 2, 2023	17:40	Long jump
November 2, 2023	19:05	Javelin throw
November 2, 2023	20:33	800 metres
November 2, 2023	20:33	Final standings

== Results ==
All times shown are in seconds.

KEY:	PR	Pan Am record	NR	National record	PB	Personal best	SB	Seasonal best	DB	Decathlon best

=== 100 m hurdles ===
Wind:
Heat 1: -0.8 m/s, Heat 2: -1.0 m/s

Rank	Heat	Name	Nationality	Time	Points	Notes
1	2	Erin Marsh	United States	13.39	1066	
2	2	Georgia Ellenwood	Canada	13.92	990	
3	1	Jordan Gray	United States	14.02	976	SB
4	2	Lilian Borja	Mexico	14.19	952	
5	2	Alysbeth Félix	Puerto Rico	14.24	945	
6	1	Ana Camila Pirelli	Paraguay	14.46	914	
7	1	Tamara de Sousa	Brazil	14.53	905	
8	2	Marys Patterson	Cuba	14.54	903	
9	1	Raiane Vasconcelos	Brazil	14.76	874	

=== High jump ===
Rank	Name	Nationality	1.49	1.52	1.58	1.58	1.61	1.64	1.67	1.70	1.73	1.76	Mark	Points	Notes	Total
1	Jordan Gray	United States	–	o	o	o	o	o	o	xxo	xo	xxx	1.73	891		1867
2	Marys Patterson	Cuba	–	–	–	o	o	o	o	o	xxx		1.70	855		1758
3	Georgia Ellenwood	Canada	–	–	–	–	o	o	o	xxo	xxx		1.70	855		1845
4	Alysbeth Félix	Puerto Rico	–	–	–	o	o	o	xxo	xxx			1.67	818		1763
5	Erin Marsh	United States	–	–	–	–	o	o	xxx				1.64	783		1849
6	Tamara de Sousa	Brazil	–	–	o	o	xxo	xo	xxx				1.64	783		1688
7	Raiane Vasconcelos	Brazil	–	–	xo	o	o	xxx					1.61	747		1621
8	Lilian Borja	Mexico	–	–	o	o	xxx						1.58	712		1664
9	Ana Camila Pirelli	Paraguay	o	o	xxx								1.52	644		1558

=== Shot put ===
Rank	Name	Nationality	#1	#2	#3	Mark	Points	Notes	Total
1	Jordan Gray	United States	12.30	13.11	12.68	13.11	735		2602
2	Tamara de Sousa	Brazil	12.26	13.07	13.02	13.07	732		2420
3	Ana Camila Pirelli	Paraguay	12.92	12.91	12.94	12.94	723		2281
4	Erin Marsh	United States	12.71	11.99	12.39	12.71	708		2557
5	Raiane Vasconcelos	Brazil	11.13	12.13	11.42	12.13	670		2291
6	Lilian Borja	Mexico	11.73	11.70	11.89	11.89	654		2318
7	Marys Patterson	Cuba	11.02	11.42	x	11.42	623		2381
8	Alysbeth Félix	Puerto Rico	10.96	10.85	10.96	10.96	592		2355
	Georgia Ellenwood	Canada						r	1845

=== 200 m ===
Wind: -0.8 m/s

Rank	Name	Nationality	Time	Points	Notes	Total
1	Erin Marsh	United States	24.18	963		3520
2	Alysbeth Félix	Puerto Rico	25.34	856		3211
3	Lilian Borja	Mexico	25.50	841		3159
4	Jordan Gray	United States	25.73	821		3423
5	Ana Camila Pirelli	Paraguay	26.00	797		3078
6	Marys Patterson	Cuba	26.03	795		3176
7	Raiane Vasconcelos	Brazil	26.50	754		3045
8	Tamara de Sousa	Brazil	26.57	748		3168

=== Long jump ===
Rank	Name	Nationality	#1	#2	#3	Mark	Points	Notes	Total
1	Alysbeth Félix	Puerto Rico	6.31	6.16	6.12	6.31	946		4157
2	Erin Marsh	United States	5.93	6.27	6.06	6.27	934	SB	4454
3	Lilian Borja	Mexico	5.49	5.50	5.63	5.63	738		3897
4	Jordan Gray	United States	x	x	5.58	5.58	723		4146
5	Tamara de Sousa	Brazil	5.22	5.46	5.56	5.56	717		3885
6	Marys Patterson	Cuba	5.52	x	3.70	5.52	706		3882
7	Ana Camila Pirelli	Paraguay	x	5.03	5.39	5.39	668	SB	3746
8	Raiane Vasconcelos	Brazil	5.35	5.37	5.14	5.37	663		3708

=== Javelin throw ===
Rank	Name	Nationality	#1	#2	#3	Mark	Points	Notes	Total
1	Ana Camila Pirelli	Paraguay	46.61	x	44.24	46.61	795	SB	4541
2	Raiane Vasconcelos	Brazil	42.24	42.58	40.89	42.58	717		4425
3	Tamara de Sousa	Brazil	39.78	38.22	39.21	39.78	663		4548
4	Alysbeth Félix	Puerto Rico	36.73	37.52	39.57	39.57	659		4816
5	Lilian Borja	Mexico	37.48	38.52	39.32	39.32	654		4551
6	Marys Patterson	Cuba	35.50	35.61	38.41	38.41	637		4519
7	Erin Marsh	United States	33.03	33.62	35.71	35.71	585	SB	5039
8	Jordan Gray	United States	30.28	–	–	30.28	482		4628

=== 800 m ===
Rank	Name	Nationality	Time	Points	Notes	Total
1	Jordan Gray	United States	2:16.91	866		5494
2	Alysbeth Félix	Puerto Rico	2:18.17	849		5665
3	Lilian Borja	Mexico	2:18.47	844		5395
4	Erin Marsh	United States	2:18.57	843		5882
5	Raiane Vasconcelos	Brazil	2:24.85	759		5184
6	Marys Patterson	Cuba	2:25.45	751		5270
7	Ana Camila Pirelli	Paraguay	2:25.89	745		5286
8	Tamara de Sousa	Brazil	2:55.61	407		4955

=== Final standings ===
The results were as follows:

Rank	Athlete	Nationality	Points	Notes
1st place, gold medalist(s)	Erin Marsh	United States	5882	
2nd place, silver medalist(s)	Alysbeth Félix	Puerto Rico	5665	
3rd place, bronze medalist(s)	Jordan Gray	United States	5494	
4	Lilian Borja	Mexico	5395	
5	Ana Camila Pirelli	Paraguay	5286	
6	Marys Patterson	Cuba	5270	
7	Raiane Vasconcelos	Brazil	5184	
8	Tamara de Sousa	Brazil	4955	
	Georgia Ellenwood	Canada	DNF	
