= Valley Christian Schools (Arizona) =

K-12 School in Chandler and Tempe, Arizona

Location
- 6900 W Galveston Street; East Valley; Chandler, Maricopa, Arizona 85226; United States; 33°18′48″N 111°57′42″W

Information
- Other name: Valley Christian Schools
- School type: K-12
- Motto: The mission of Valley Christian Schools is to equip students to be culture changers for Christ by delivering academic excellence, facilitating spiritual growth, and building lifelong community.
- Religious affiliation: Christian
- Denomination: Non-denominational
- Established: 1982
- School district: Private
- Grades: K-12
- Years offered: 5-18
- Language: English, Spanish, American Sign Language (ASL)
- Campus type: Suburban
- Colors: Blue, silver, and white
- Athletics conference: 3A
- Mascot: Victor E. Trojan
- Nickname: Trojans
- Accreditation: Cognia, ACSI
- Website: https://valleychristianaz.org/
- Last updated: August 28, 2025

Valley Christian Schools is a private K-12, covenant Christian school with campuses located in Chandler, Arizona, and Tempe, Arizona, United States.

== History ==
Valley Christian Schools was first conceptualized in 1981, when six men met together to consider the creation of a Christian high school in the East Valley, which at the time, had a lack of non-denominational Christian schools. A year later in 1982, Valley Christian High School opened its doors at Bethany Christian Community Church in Tempe, Arizona. Today, Valley Christian Schools features a nationally ranked Christian school offering education from Kindergarten through high school, located across two campuses in the greater Phoenix metropolitan area.

In 1997, Valley Christian (then only a high school) moved to its current high school campus in Chandler, Arizona. In 2017, Valley Christian announced the addition of grades 6–8. Grades 6-8 were added for the 2018–19 school year. In 2018, Valley Christian announced the addition of an elementary school. In the 2019–20 school year, grades K-5 were added. Grades K-8 are now located at Valley Christian Schools' K-8 campus in Tempe, Arizona.

== Academics ==
Valley Christian Schools offers an education with a college prep emphasis with Biblical integration in every course. Historically, the majority of VCS graduates are accepted into the college or university of their choice, with a high percentage going on to pursue higher education. VCS students have enrolled in a wide variety of public and Christian colleges.

In 2006, a special education program was implemented, known as VINE (Valley's Individual Needs Enhancements). Valley Christian Schools is one of the only Christian high schools in Arizona to have a full-time special education program.

Valley Christian offers Advanced Placement and Dual Enrollment college courses to its high school students. These programs give upperclassmen the opportunity to acquire college credits while attending high school. The school is accredited by Cognia and Association of Christian Schools International (ACSI).

== Athletics ==
Valley Christian Schools is a member of the Arizona Interscholastic Association (AIA) 3A Conference.

Since 1989, the school has won state championships in boys basketball, girls basketball, girls volleyball, girls beach volleyball, boys swimming, girls swimming, cheer, boys cross country, girls cross country, football, boys soccer, baseball, softball, boys track and field, girls track and field, and golf.

Valley Christian was awarded the inaugural Blue Cross and Blue Shield Directors Cup Award in 2004, given to the Arizona high school that is rated highest in participation, sportsmanship and success in all athletic programs. It has also received the Donald F. Stone Award seven times.

In 1999, the Valley Christian athletic program was named the #1 Women's High School Athletic Program in the nation by Athletic Management. In 1997-98, Valley Christian was a recipient of the Tony Komadina Award for Outstanding Girls' Athletic Program in Arizona.

In 2015–16, the school was voted as having the Best Athletic Program in Arizona and one of the Top 12 in the United States by The USA Today.

The school has had seven alumni (Courtney Blocher '00, Kim Wigboldy '07, Riley Barclay '08, Alaina Bergsma '08, Breanna Leslie '09, Chanel Brown '10, Ashton Wolf '11), four coaches (Deanna Anglin, Marlin Broek, Dan Kuiper, Scott Timmer, Greg Haagsma), one administrator (Troy Hanzal), and one team (1999-2000 girls volleyball) inducted into the Chandler Sports Hall of Fame.

== Notable alumni ==
- Austin Moorehead '03, producer/multi-instrumentalist
- David Melhorn '04, 2021 Boys Track & Field Coach of the Year in Arizona, Arizona State University track and field, 2006-08 Academic All-Pac-10 Honorable Mention
- Alaina Bergsma '08, University of Oregon volleyball, University of Oregon Hall of Fame, 2012 National Player of the Year, 2011 AVCA All-American First Team, 2011 Pac-12 Volleyball Player of the Year, Miss Oregon USA 2012
- Kelsey Moore '08, University of Texas at El Paso volleyball, Miss Texas USA 2010
- Breanna Leslie '09, Azusa Pacific University track and field, American pentathlete, heptathlete, and 100m hurdler, Team USA 2015, 2012 NAIA Indoor National Championship 60 meter hurdles winner
- Dominic Zvada, American football kicker for Arkansas State and the University of Michigan
