= Breanna Leslie =

American heptathlete and hurdler

Personal information
- Nationality: United States
- Born: August 11, 1991 (age 34) Phoenix, Arizona, U.S.
- Education: Azusa Pacific University
- Height: 5 ft 9 in (175 cm)
- Weight: 140 lb (64 kg)

Sport
- Sport: Heptathlon, Pentathlon
- Turned pro: 2013
- Personal best(s): Heptathlon: 5918 points Azusa, 2016 Pentathlon: 4182 points Albuquerque, 2014 100 m hurdles: 13.26 s Chula Vista, 2015

Breanna Leslie (born August 11, 1991, in Phoenix, Arizona) is an American pentathlete, heptathlete, and 100 m hurdler.

Leslie enters her first season as an assistant coach for the men's and women's cross country and track & field teams at Ottawa University Arizona in 2017–2018. Leslie came to Surprise, Arizona following a successful professional career.

Leslie competed at the professional level from 2013 to 2016. She was inducted into the Chandler Sports Hall of Fame in 2015 and also competed for Team USA in 2015 at the Pan-American Games in Toronto, Ontario, Canada and placed sixth. Leslie competed for Team USA in the Thorpe Cup in 2014; held in Marburg, Germany and placed 7th. She also competed for Team USA in the 2013 Pan American Cup in Ottawa, Ontario, Canada and placed fifth. Throughout her professional career, Breanna Leslie qualified for five USA Track & Field Championships.

Leslie graduated from Azusa Pacific University in the spring of 2013. While in college, Leslie was a 21-time All-American from 2010 to 2013 and holds the school records in the 60m hurdles, pentathlon, and the heptathlon. She finished her collegiate career as a 4-time NAIA National Champion (Pentathlon, Distance Medley Relay, 60m Hurdles, Heptathlon), a 4-time NCCAA National Champion (Pentathlon, 60m Hurdles, 100m Hurdles, High Jump), and was selected as the Team Captain in 2012 and 2013.

Leslie attended Valley Christian High School in Chandler, Arizona. While in school, she competed for their track & field teams. She is the school record holder in the 300m Hurdles, 4x4 relay, and the heptathlon. Leslie is an 11-time Arizona State Champion in the 100m hurdles, 300m hurdles, 4x1 relay, 4x4 relay, and the 200m. She was also chosen as the team captain in 2008 and 2009.

== Professional ==
Leslie trained in Azusa, California with two-time Olympic medalist Bryan Clay.
2016 Mt SAC Relays, 5th (heptathlon)
2015 Pan-American Games CE Cup, 6th (heptathlon)
2014 Thorpe Cup, 7th (heptathlon)
2014 Mt SAC Relays, 5th (heptathlon)
2013 Pan-American Games CE Cup, 5th (heptathlon)

=== US Track and field Championships ===
Year	Championship	Venue	Place	Competition	Score
2013	USA Indoor Track and Field Championships	Albuquerque, New Mexico	8th	Pentathlon	4053
2013	USA Outdoor Track and Field Championships	Des Moines, Iowa	13th	Heptathlon	5503
2014	USA Indoor Track and Field Championships	Albuquerque, New Mexico	5th	Pentathlon	4182
2014	USA Outdoor Track and Field Championships	Sacramento, California	8th	Heptathlon	5838
2015	USA Indoor Track and Field Championships	Boston, Massachusetts	5th	Pentathlon	4134
2015	USA Outdoor Track and Field Championships	Eugene, Oregon	11th	Heptathlon	5718

== Azusa Pacific University ==
Breanna Leslie Azusa Pacific University championship results

- 2013

NCCAA Outdoor Track & Field Championships

  - 100 m hurdles - 1st
  - 200 m - 2nd
  - high jump - 2nd
  - long jump - 3rd
  - 4 × 400 m - 2nd
  - 4 × 100 m - 3rd

2013 Mt SAC Relays, 3rd (heptathlon)

- 2012

2012 NAIA Indoor Track and Field Championships champion (60m Hurdles, pentathlon, Distance Medley Relay)
2012 NAIA Outdoor Track and Field Championships champion (Heptathlon) 6th place (100 m hurdles)
2012 Golden State Athletic Conference

  - 4 × 400 m - 1st
  - 4 × 100 m - 1st
  - 100 m hurdles - 1st
  - 200 m - 1st
  - Javelin - 4th

2012 Mt SAC Relays, 7th (heptathlon)

- 2011

2011 NAIA Indoor Track and Field Championships 2nd place (Pentathlon)
2011 NAIA Outdoor Track and Field Championships 2nd place (heptathlon)
2011 Golden State Athletic Conference

  - 4 × 400 m - 1st
  - 4 × 100 m - 1st
  - 100 m hurdles - 2nd
  - 200 m - 1st
  - Javelin - 14th
  - High Jump - 3rd

2011 Mt SAC Relays, 3rd (heptathlon)
2011 NAIA Indoor Track and Field Championships 3rd place (pentathlon, 60 meters hurdles)

- 2010

2010 NAIA Outdoor Track and Field Championships 10th place (100 m hurdles)
2010 NAIA Outdoor Track and Field Championships 2nd place (heptathlon)
2010 Mt SAC Relays, 3rd (heptathlon)
2010 NAIA Indoor Track and Field Championships 6th place (pentathlon)

== High school ==
Breanna Leslie graduated from Valley Christian High School in Phoenix, Arizona. Breanna Leslie grew up in Chandler, Arizona the daughter of Lynton and Rae Leslie. Leslie's hobbies include playing volleyball, watersports, horseback riding and fishing. 11 time High School state champion 2A Division, 100 hurdles, 300 hurdles, 200m, 4x100, 4x400
