= Jessamyn Sauceda =

Mexican athletics competitor

Personal information
- Born: 22 May 1989 (age 36)
- Education: EGADE Business School
- Height: 1.73 m (5 ft 8 in)
- Weight: 60 kg (132 lb)

Sport
- Sport: Athletics
- Event: Long jump

Jessamyn Maribel Sauceda de la Trinidad (born 22 May 1989) is a Mexican athlete competing in the long jump and combined events. She represented her country in the long jump at the 2017 World Championships without qualifying for the final.

Her personal bests in the long jump are 6.74 metres outdoors (-0.6 m/s, Mexico City 2017) and 6.02 metres indoors (Albuquerque 2016).

== International competitions ==
Year	Competition	Venue	Position	Event	Notes
Representing Mexico
2013	Central American and Caribbean Championships	Morelia, Mexico	4th	Heptathlon	5164 pts
2014	Pan American Combined Events Cup	Ottawa, Canada	10th	Heptathlon	5294 pts
2014	Central American and Caribbean Games	Xalapa, Mexico	4th	Heptathlon	5606 pts
2015	Pan American Games	Toronto, Canada	8th	Heptathlon	5786 pts
2017	World Championships	London, United Kingdom	29th (q)	Long jump	5.61 m
2018	World Indoor Championships	Birmingham, United Kingdom	13th	Long jump	5.99 m
2018	Central American and Caribbean Games	Barranquilla, Colombia	4th	Long jump	6.44 m (w)

== Personal bests ==
Outdoor

- 200 metres – 24.53 (+1.1 m/s, Monterrey 2016)
- 800 metres – 2:20.46 (Austin 2016)
- 100 metres hurdles – 13.96 (+0.7 m/s, Azusa 2015)
- High jump – 1.74 (Toronto 2015)
- Long jump – 6.74 (-0.6 m/s, Mexico City 2017) NR
- Shot put – 12.66 (Monterrey 2016)
- Javelin throw – 40.04 (Austin 2016)
- Heptathlon – 5786 (Toronto 2015) NR

Indoor

- 60 metres hurdles – 8.63 (Albuquerque 2016)
- Long jump – 6.02 (Albuquerque 2016)
