= Erin Marsh =

American athlete (born 1999)

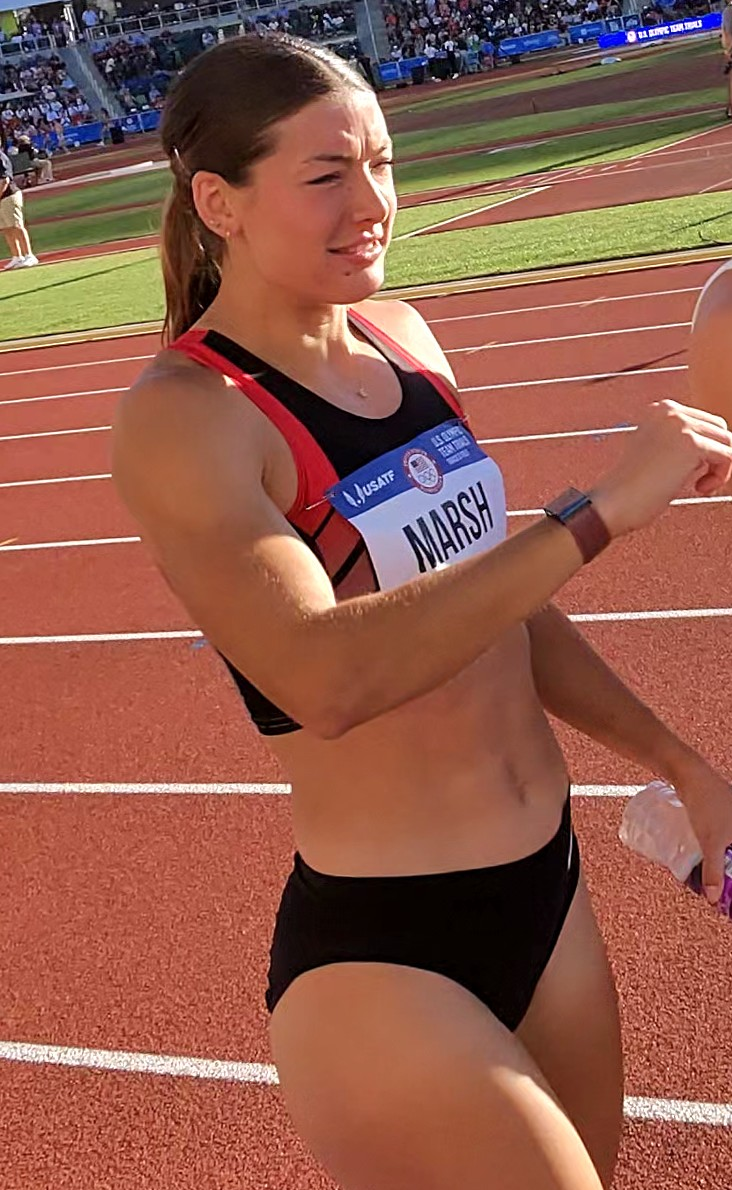
- Marsh at the 2024 United States Olympic trials

Personal information
- Nationality: United States
- Born: July 12, 1999 (age 27)

Sport
- Sport: Athletics
- Event: Heptathlon
Medal record
Women's athletics
Representing the United States
Pan American Games
Gold medal – first place	2023 Santiago	Heptathlon

Erin Marsh (born July 12, 1999) is an American track and field athlete. She won the heptathlon title at the 2026 USA Outdoor Track and Field Championships and the gold medal at the 2023 Pan American Games.

== Early life ==
Marsh attended Buford High School in Buford, Georgia where she competed in track, cross country, and cheerleading, prior to graduating in 2017. She then attended Duke University.

== NCAA ==
She won the bronze medal in the pentathlon at the 2021 NCAA Division I Indoor Track and Field Championships, behind Tyra Gittens and Anna Hall in Fayetteville, Arkansas in March 2021. She also won the bronze medal behind Hall in the heptathlon at the 2022 NCAA Division I Outdoor Track and Field Championships in Eugene, Oregon having amassed 5,929 points in total.

== Professional career ==
In February 2023, she finished third in the pentathlon at the USA Indoor Championships, held at the Convention Center, Albuquerque. Marsh won the gold medal in the heptathlon at the 2023 Pan American Games in Santiago, Chile.

After overcoming a succession of injuries at the start of 2024, she competed at the US Olympic trials in Eugene, Oregon, in June 2024, and finished twelfth overall in the heptathlon competition.

She finished in eleventh place overall in the heptathlon at the Hypo-Meeting in Götzis, Austria, on 1 June 2025. She was runner-up in the heptathlon at the International Meeting of Arona in Spain, the second Gold leg of the World Athletics Combined Events Tour, in June 2025. She placed twelfth overall in the season-long World Athletics Combined Events Tour for 2025.

Marsh tied her lifetime best of 4,432 points for the pentathlon at the 2026 USATF Combined Events Championships on 22 February, finishing behind Anna Hall and Timara Chapman for third overall. In June, Marsh set a new personal best tally in heptathlon of 6305 points competing in Ratingen, Germany. On 24 July, she won the heptathlon title at the 2026 USA Outdoor Track and Field Championships in New York, ahead of Chapman, with a score of 6,059 points.

== Personal life ==
Her brother is Major League Baseball player Brandon Marsh, who has played for the Los Angeles Angels and Philadelphia Phillies as an outfielder.
