= Barbara Nwaba =

American track and field athlete (born 1989)

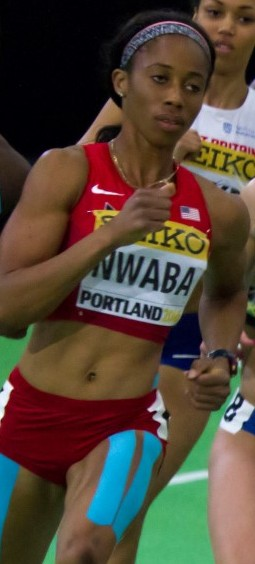
- Barbara Nwaba at the 2016 IAAF World Indoor Championships

Personal information
- Full name: Barbara Udoezi Nwaba
- Born: January 18, 1989 (age 37) Los Angeles, California, United States
- Education: University of California, Santa Barbara (B.A. 2012)
- Occupation: Track and field athlete
- Height: 5 ft 9 in (175 cm)

Sport
- College team: UC Santa Barbara Gauchos
- Team: Santa Barbara Track Club
- Coached by: Josh Priester

Achievements and titles
- Olympic finals: 2016
- World finals: 2016, 2015
Medal record
Event	1st	2nd	3rd
World Indoor Championships	0	0	1
Total	0	0	1
Bronze medal – third place	2016 Portland	Pentathlon
- Updated on 02:41, 30 June 2015 (UTC)

Barbara Udoezi Nwaba (born January 18, 1989) is an American track and field athlete who represents the Santa Barbara Track Club. Nwaba is known for the pentathlon and heptathlon. She is the 2015 USA Outdoor Track and Field champion in the heptathlon.

== Early life and education ==
Nwaba was born January 18, 1989, in Los Angeles, California, to Nigerian parents Theodore & Blessing Nwaba. She is the oldest of 6 children. A 2007 graduate of University High School, Nwaba was the CIF Los Angeles City Section champion in the 300 meters hurdles in 2007 and a 4-time runner up and representative in the high jump to the CIF California State Meet, but was eliminated in the preliminary rounds.

Nwaba attended the University of California, Santa Barbara on academic grounds, intending to study optometry, ultimately graduating in 2012 with a degree in sociology. After redshirting a season, she set the school records in the 100 meters hurdles, 400 meters hurdles (since surpassed), and was part of the record-setting 4 × 400 meters relay team (also since surpassed). In the process, she also ranked in the top ten in most of the heptathlon events. She finished her career as the champion of the Big West Conference heptathlon in 2012 en route to being named an All-American.

Her brother, David Nwaba is a professional basketball player.

== Career ==
Continuing with the multi-event-oriented Santa Barbara Track Club, Nwaba made steady improvements with coach Josh Priester, a former UCSB track and field coach. She was fifth at the 2012 Olympic Trials scoring 5986 points.

Nwaba was an assistant coach at Santa Barbara High School in the 2012–13 school year.

At the 2014 Outdoor Championships she finished second to Sharon Day-Monroe in the heptathlon by 163 points, scoring 6307 points.

Barbara Nwaba is the 2015 American Champion, edging Sharon Day-Monroe by 42 points, scoring exactly 6500 points. She finished second to Day-Monroe at the 2015 USA Indoor Track and Field Championships in the pentathlon. Nwaba's total makes her the sixth-highest-scoring heptathlon performer in United States history.

At the 2015 World Championships in Athletics, Nwaba misstepped the very first hurdle and then fell over the second. She continued in the competition despite the event costing her points. Ultimately, Nwaba completed the heptathlon and scored 5,315 points to place 27th. In the process Nwaba recorded new personal bests in the javelin and shot put.

Barbara Nwaba is the 2016 American Pentathlon Champion and qualified to represent the USA at the 2016 World Indoor Championships in Athletics. Barbara Nwaba earned a bronze medal behind Brianne Theisen-Eaton and Alina Fyodorova in the Pentathlon at the 2016 World Indoor Championships scoring 4661 points.

Barbara Nwaba scored 6494 points in the Heptathlon to join Team USA teammates Heather Miller-Koch and Kendell Williams at the 2016 United States Olympic Trials. She represented USA at the 2016 Summer Olympics finishing 12th as the top American.
