= Thorpe Cup =

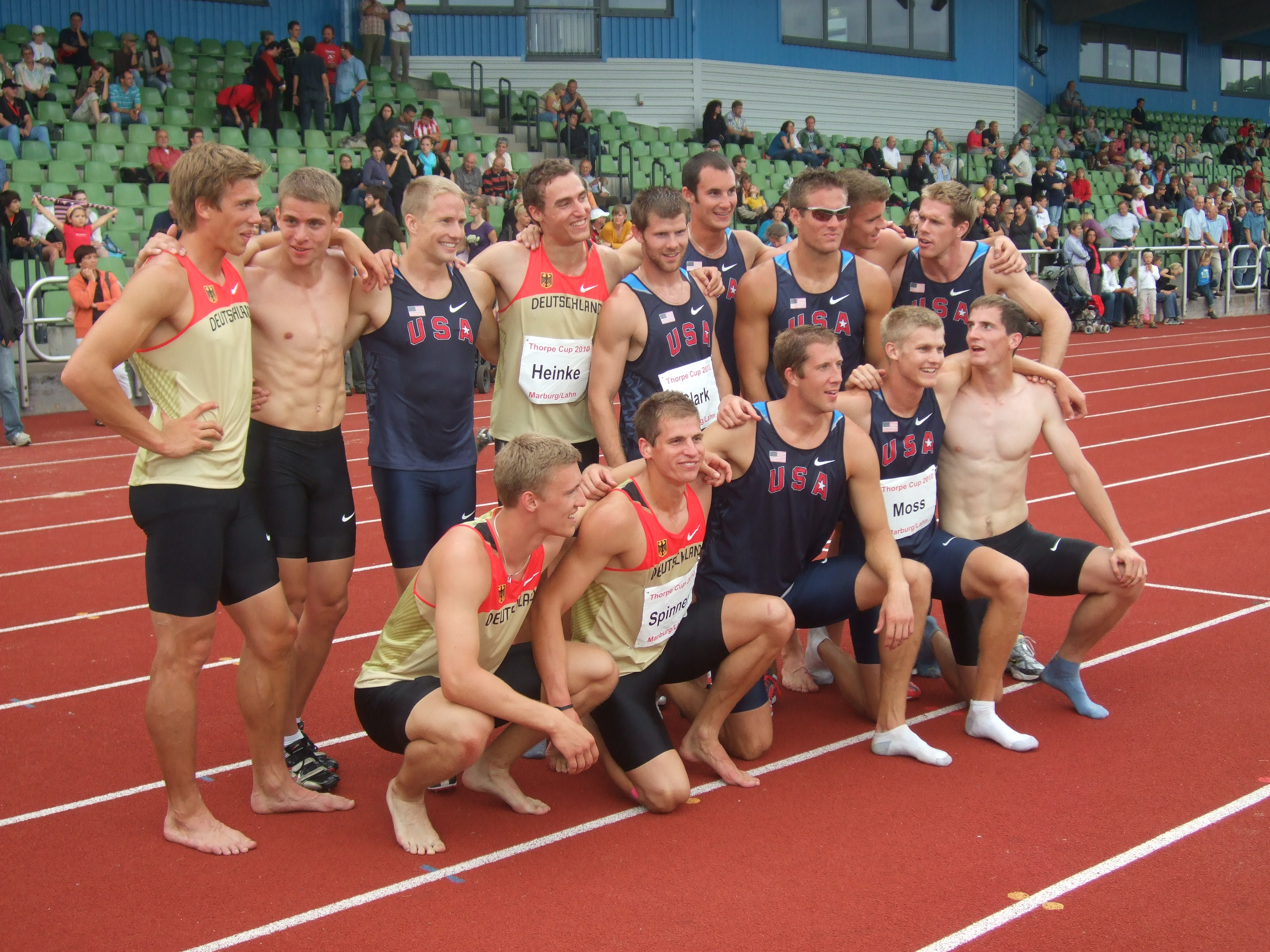
The athletes from both countries following the 2010 Thorpe Cup

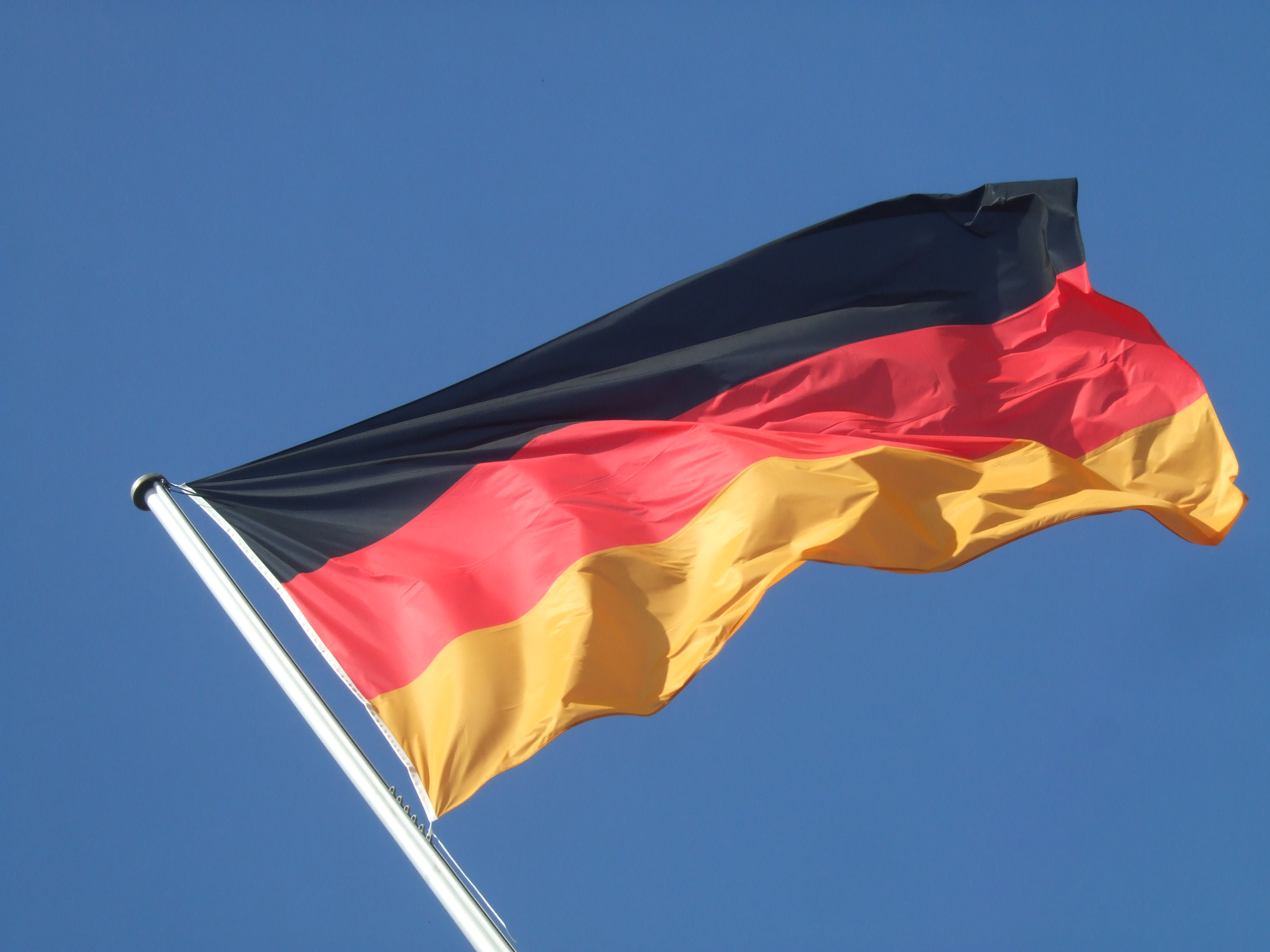
The German flag at the 2010 Thorpe Cup

The Thorpe Cup is an annual international decathlon and heptathlon meeting between the United States and Germany.

The competition was first held in 1993 in Aachen. The 2009 and 2010 events were staged at the Georg-Gaßmann-Stadion in Marburg. The meeting is named after the famous Olympian Jim Thorpe.

Tom Pappas holds the meeting record with 8569 points scored at the 2009 event.
